= 2017–18 Milwaukee Bucks season =

NBA professional basketball team season

- Head coach: Jason Kidd (fired on January 22); Joe Prunty (interim)
- General manager: Jon Horst
- Owners: Wesley Edens & Marc Lasry
- Arena: Bradley Center

Results
- Record: 44–38 (.537)
- Place: Division: 3rd (Central); Conference: 7th (Eastern)
- Playoff finish: First Round (lost to Celtics 3–4)
- Stats at Basketball Reference

Local media
- Television: Fox Sports Wisconsin
- Radio: WTMJ (AM)

The 2017–18 Milwaukee Bucks season was the 50th season of the franchise in the National Basketball Association (NBA). On June 16, 2017, the Bucks named Jon Horst as their new general manager. This was the Bucks' final season at the Bradley Center, with their move to the new Fiserv Forum beginning with the 2018–19 NBA season. On January 22, 2018, the Bucks fired head coach Jason Kidd and replaced him with the team's assistant head coach Joe Prunty as interim head coach.

They finished the regular season with 44–38, which clinched the 7th seed. In the playoffs, the Bucks faced the 2nd seeded Boston Celtics in the first round, and lost in seven games.

== Draft picks ==
Round	Pick	Player	Position(s)	Nationality	School
1	17	D. J. Wilson	PF	United States	Michigan

== Roster ==
2017–18 Milwaukee Bucks roster
Players

Pos.	No.	Player	Height	Weight	DOB	From
F	34	Giannis Antetokounmpo	6 ft 11 in (2.11 m)	242 lb (110 kg)	1994–12–06	Greece
G	6	Eric Bledsoe	6 ft 1 in (1.85 m)	205 lb (93 kg)	1989–12–09	Kentucky
G	13	Malcolm Brogdon	6 ft 5 in (1.96 m)	215 lb (98 kg)	1992–12–11	Virginia
F	23	Sterling Brown	6 ft 6 in (1.98 m)	230 lb (104 kg)	1995–02–10	SMU
G	8	Matthew Dellavedova	6 ft 4 in (1.93 m)	210 lb (95 kg)	1990–09–08	Saint Mary's
F	31	John Henson	6 ft 11 in (2.11 m)	229 lb (104 kg)	1990–12–28	North Carolina
G	11	Brandon Jennings	6 ft 1 in (1.85 m)	170 lb (77 kg)	1989–09–23	Oak Hill Academy (VA)
C	7	Thon Maker	7 ft 1 in (2.16 m)	243 lb (110 kg)	1997–02–25	Orangeville Prep (CAN)
G/F	22	Khris Middleton	6 ft 8 in (2.03 m)	234 lb (106 kg)	1991–08–12	Texas A&M
G	15	Shabazz Muhammad	6 ft 6 in (1.98 m)	221 lb (100 kg)	1992–11–13	UCLA
G	0	Xavier Munford (TW)	6 ft 4 in (1.93 m)	173 lb (78 kg)	1992–06–01	Rhode Island
F	12	Jabari Parker	6 ft 8 in (2.03 m)	250 lb (113 kg)	1995–03–15	Duke
C	40	Marshall Plumlee (TW)	7 ft 1 in (2.16 m)	250 lb (113 kg)	1991–07–14	Duke
G/F	21	Tony Snell	6 ft 7 in (2.01 m)	221 lb (100 kg)	1991–11–10	New Mexico
G	3	Jason Terry	6 ft 2 in (1.88 m)	185 lb (84 kg)	1977–09–15	Arizona
F	5	D. J. Wilson	6 ft 10 in (2.08 m)	236 lb (107 kg)	1996–02–19	Michigan
C	44	Tyler Zeller	7 ft 0 in (2.13 m)	255 lb (116 kg)	1990–01–17	North Carolina

Coaches
Head coach
- Joe Prunty (interim)
Assistant(s)
- Stacey Augmon
- Vin Baker
- Greg Foster
- Eric Hughes
- Chris Porter
- Sean Sweeney

Legend
- (DP) Unsigned draft pick
- (FA) Free agent
- (S) Suspended
- (GL) On assignment to G League affiliate
- (TW) Two-way affiliate player
- Injured

Roster
Updated: 2018–04–01

== Standings ==
=== Division ===
Central Division	W	L	PCT	GB	Home	Road	Div	GP
y – Cleveland Cavaliers	50	32	.610	–	29‍–‍12	21‍–‍20	11–5	82
x – Indiana Pacers	48	34	.585	2.0	27‍–‍14	21‍–‍20	10–6	82
x – Milwaukee Bucks	44	38	.537	6.0	25‍–‍16	19‍–‍22	6–10	82
Detroit Pistons	39	43	.476	11.0	25‍–‍16	14‍–‍27	9–7	82
Chicago Bulls	27	55	.329	23.0	17‍–‍24	10‍–‍31	4–12	82

=== Conference ===
Eastern Conference
#	Team	W	L	PCT	GB	GP
1	c – Toronto Raptors *	59	23	.720	–	82
2	x – Boston Celtics	55	27	.671	4.0	82
3	x – Philadelphia 76ers	52	30	.634	7.0	82
4	y – Cleveland Cavaliers *	50	32	.610	9.0	82
5	x – Indiana Pacers	48	34	.585	11.0	82
6	y – Miami Heat *	44	38	.537	15.0	82
7	x – Milwaukee Bucks	44	38	.537	15.0	82
8	x – Washington Wizards	43	39	.524	16.0	82
9	Detroit Pistons	39	43	.476	20.0	82
10	Charlotte Hornets	36	46	.439	23.0	82
11	New York Knicks	29	53	.354	30.0	82
12	Brooklyn Nets	28	54	.341	31.0	82
13	Chicago Bulls	27	55	.329	32.0	82
14	Orlando Magic	25	57	.305	34.0	82
15	Atlanta Hawks	24	58	.293	35.0	82

== Game log ==
=== Preseason ===
2017 pre-season game log
Total: 1–3 (home: 1–1; road: 0–2)
Pre-season: 1–3 (home: 1–1; road: 0–2)

Game	Date	Team	Score	High points	High rebounds	High assists	Location Attendance	Record
1	October 2	@ Dallas	L 104–106	Rashad Vaughn (20)	Monroe, Teletovic (7)	Kendall Marshall (10)	American Airlines Center; 16,223	0–1
2	October 4	Indiana	L 86–104	Gary Payton II (15)	Gary Payton II (7)	Gary Payton II (5)	Bradley Center; 6,691	0–2
3	October 6	@ Chicago	L 101–114	Giannis Antetokounmpo (24)	Brown, Henson, Monroe (5)	Brogdon, Middleton (5)	United Center; 17,187	0–3
4	October 13	Detroit	W 107–103	Giannis Antetokounmpo (17)	Thon Maker (8)	Matthew Dellavedova (7)	Bradley Center; 9,528	1–3

2017–18 season schedule

=== Regular season ===
2017–18 game log
Total: 44–38 (home: 25–16; road: 19–22)
October: 4–3 (home: 2–3; road: 2–0)

Game	Date	Team	Score	High points	High rebounds	High assists	Location Attendance	Record
1	October 18	@ Boston	W 108–100	Giannis Antetokounmpo (37)	Giannis Antetokounmpo (13)	Khris Middleton (6)	TD Garden; 18,624	1–0
2	October 20	Cleveland	L 97–116	Giannis Antetokounmpo (34)	Giannis Antetokounmpo (8)	Giannis Antetokounmpo (8)	Bradley Center; 18,717	1–1
3	October 21	Portland	W 113–110	Giannis Antetokounmpo (44)	John Henson (9)	Malcolm Brogdon (6)	Bradley Center; 16,211	2–1
4	October 23	Charlotte	W 103–94	Giannis Antetokounmpo (32)	Giannis Antetokounmpo (14)	Matthew Dellavedova (9)	Bradley Center; 12,887	3–1
5	October 26	Boston	L 89–96	Giannis Antetokounmpo (28)	Giannis Antetokounmpo (10)	Giannis Antetokounmpo (7)	UW–Milwaukee Panther Arena; 11,046	3–2
6	October 29	@ Atlanta	W 117–106	Giannis Antetokounmpo (33)	Giannis Antetokounmpo (11)	Khris Middleton (9)	Philips Arena; 14,014	4–2
7	October 31	Oklahoma City	L 91–110	Giannis Antetokounmpo (28)	Giannis Antetokounmpo (8)	Tony Snell (5)	Bradley Center; 16,713	4–3

November : 7–6 (home: 3–1; road: 4–5)

Game	Date	Team	Score	High points	High rebounds	High assists	Location Attendance	Record
8	November 1	@ Charlotte	L 121–126	Khris Middleton (43)	Giannis Antetokounmpo (13)	Khris Middleton (7)	Spectrum Center; 15,655	4–4
9	November 3	@ Detroit	L 96–105	Giannis Antetokounmpo (29)	John Henson (13)	Malcolm Brogdon (10)	Little Caesars Arena; 17,207	4–5
10	November 7	@ Cleveland	L 119–124	Giannis Antetokounmpo (40)	Giannis Antetokounmpo (9)	Khris Middleton (11)	Quicken Loans Arena; 20,562	4–6
11	November 10	@ San Antonio	W 94–87	Giannis Antetokounmpo (28)	Giannis Antetokounmpo (12)	Eric Bledsoe (7)	AT&T Center; 18,418	5–6
12	November 11	L.A. Lakers	W 98–90	Giannis Antetokounmpo (32)	Giannis Antetokounmpo (15)	Khris Middleton (4)	Bradley Center; 18,717	6–6
13	November 13	Memphis	W 110–103	Giannis Antetokounmpo (27)	Giannis Antetokounmpo (9)	Giannis Antetokounmpo (7)	Bradley Center; 13,244	7–6
14	November 15	Detroit	W 99–95	Khris Middleton (27)	John Henson (10)	Antetokounmpo, Bledsoe (8)	Bradley Center; 14,594	8–6
15	November 18	@ Dallas	L 79–111	Giannis Antetokounmpo (24)	Giannis Antetokounmpo (17)	Eric Bledsoe (4)	American Airlines Center; 19,949	8–7
16	November 20	Washington	L 88–99	Giannis Antetokounmpo (23)	John Henson (10)	Giannis Antetokounmpo (4)	Bradley Center; 16,122	8–8
17	November 22	@ Phoenix	W 113–107 (OT)	Khris Middleton (40)	Khris Middleton (9)	Eric Bledsoe (7)	Talking Stick Resort Arena; 16,270	9–8
18	November 25	@ Utah	L 108–121	Giannis Antetokounmpo (27)	Giannis Antetokounmpo (13)	Eric Bledsoe (7)	Vivint Smart Home Arena; 17,298	9–9
19	November 28	@ Sacramento	W 112–87	Giannis Antetokounmpo (32)	Malcolm Brogdon (6)	Bledsoe, Brogdon (5)	Golden 1 Center; 17,583	10–9
20	November 30	@ Portland	W 103–91	Khris Middleton (26)	John Henson (10)	Giannis Antetokounmpo (5)	Moda Center; 19,459	11–9

December : 8–6 (home: 7–2; road: 1–4)

Game	Date	Team	Score	High points	High rebounds	High assists	Location Attendance	Record
21	December 2	Sacramento	W 109–104	Giannis Antetokounmpo (33)	Giannis Antetokounmpo (13)	Antetokounmpo, Brogdon (5)	Bradley Center; 15,581	12–9
22	December 4	@ Boston	L 100–111	Giannis Antetokounmpo (40)	Giannis Antetokounmpo (9)	Khris Middleton (5)	TD Garden; 18,624	12–10
23	December 6	Detroit	W 104–100	Giannis Antetokounmpo (25)	Giannis Antetokounmpo (9)	Khris Middleton (6)	Bradley Center; 15,841	13–10
24	December 8	Dallas	W 109–102	Giannis Antetokounmpo (27)	Giannis Antetokounmpo (11)	Malcolm Brogdon (6)	Bradley Center; 15,889	14–10
25	December 9	Utah	W 117–100	Giannis Antetokounmpo (37)	Giannis Antetokounmpo (13)	Giannis Antetokounmpo (7)	Bradley Center; 16,675	15–10
26	December 13	@ New Orleans	L 108–115	Giannis Antetokounmpo (32)	Giannis Antetokounmpo (9)	Khris Middleton (10)	Smoothie King Center; 16,863	15–11
27	December 15	Chicago	L 109–115	Antetokounmpo, Middleton (29)	Giannis Antetokounmpo (16)	Eric Bledsoe (7)	Bradley Center; 16,921	15–12
28	December 16	@ Houston	L 111–115	Giannis Antetokounmpo (28)	Giannis Antetokounmpo (9)	Giannis Antetokounmpo (5)	Toyota Center; 18,055	15–13
29	December 19	Cleveland	W 119–116	Giannis Antetokounmpo (27)	Giannis Antetokounmpo (14)	Khris Middleton (10)	Bradley Center; 18,717	16–13
30	December 22	Charlotte	W 109–104	Khris Middleton (28)	John Henson (8)	Eric Bledsoe (10)	Bradley Center; 17,018	17–13
31	December 23	@ Charlotte	L 106–111	Khris Middleton (31)	Eric Bledsoe (7)	Eric Bledsoe (6)	Spectrum Center; 18,363	17–14
32	December 26	Chicago	L 106–115	Giannis Antetokounmpo (28)	Antetokounmpo, Snell (7)	Eric Bledsoe (6)	Bradley Center; 18,717	17–15
33	December 28	Minnesota	W 102–96	Eric Bledsoe (26)	Giannis Antetokounmpo (10)	Eric Bledsoe (6)	Bradley Center; 18,717	18–15
34	December 29	@ Oklahoma City	W 97–95	Giannis Antetokounmpo (23)	Giannis Antetokounmpo (12)	Matthew Dellavedova (9)	Chesapeake Energy Arena; 18,203	19–15

January : 8–7 (home: 5–3; road: 3–4)

Game	Date	Team	Score	High points	High rebounds	High assists	Location Attendance	Record
35	January 1	@ Toronto	L 127–131 (OT)	Eric Bledsoe (29)	Giannis Antetokounmpo (9)	Matthew Dellavedova (10)	Air Canada Centre; 19,800	19–16
36	January 3	Indiana	W 122–101	Giannis Antetokounmpo (31)	Giannis Antetokounmpo (10)	Matthew Dellavedova (9)	Bradley Center; 15,613	20–16
37	January 5	Toronto	L 110–129	Giannis Antetokounmpo (24)	Thon Maker (8)	Dellavedova, Middleton (7)	Bradley Center; 18,717	20–17
38	January 6	@ Washington	W 110–103	Giannis Antetokounmpo (34)	Giannis Antetokounmpo (12)	Giannis Antetokounmpo (7)	Capital One Arena; 18,762	21–17
39	January 8	@ Indiana	L 96–109	Khris Middleton (19)	Giannis Antetokounmpo (7)	Brogdon, Middleton (4)	Bankers Life Fieldhouse; 14,670	21–18
40	January 10	Orlando	W 110–103	Giannis Antetokounmpo (26)	John Henson (10)	Malcolm Brogdon (7)	Bradley Center; 14,543	22–18
41	January 12	Golden State	L 94–108	Giannis Antetokounmpo (23)	John Henson (8)	Antetokounmpo, Brogdon, Dellavedova, Middleton (4)	Bradley Center; 18,717	22–19
42	January 14	@ Miami	L 79–97	Giannis Antetokounmpo (22)	John Henson (9)	Eric Bledsoe (4)	American Airlines Arena; 19,600	22–20
43	January 15	@ Washington	W 104–95	Giannis Antetokounmpo (27)	Giannis Antetokounmpo (20)	Giannis Antetokounmpo (6)	Capital One Arena; 19,607	23–20
44	January 17	Miami	L 101–106	Khris Middleton (25)	Antetokounmpo, Henson (10)	Giannis Antetokounmpo (6)	Bradley Center; 16,695	23–21
45	January 20	@ Philadelphia	L 94–116	Khris Middleton (23)	Khris Middleton (14)	Khris Middleton (10)	Wells Fargo Center; 20,826	23–22
46	January 22	Phoenix	W 109–105	Khris Middleton (35)	Henson, Middleton (6)	Eric Bledsoe (7)	Bradley Center; 14,766	24–22
47	January 26	Brooklyn	W 116–91	Giannis Antetokounmpo (41)	Giannis Antetokounmpo (13)	Giannis Antetokounmpo (4)	Bradley Center; 18,717	25–22
48	January 28	@ Chicago	W 110–96	Giannis Antetokounmpo (27)	Giannis Antetokounmpo (9)	Giannis Antetokounmpo (8)	United Center; 21,630	26–22
49	January 29	Philadelphia	W 107–95	Giannis Antetokounmpo (31)	Giannis Antetokounmpo (18)	Antetokounmpo, Middleton (6)	Bradley Center; 14,126	27–22

February : 6–6 (home: 2–3; road: 4–3)

Game	Date	Team	Score	High points	High rebounds	High assists	Location Attendance	Record
50	February 1	@ Minnesota	L 89–108	Khris Middleton (21)	Giannis Antetokounmpo (15)	Giannis Antetokounmpo (6)	Target Center; 17,199	27–23
51	February 2	New York	W 92–90	Giannis Antetokounmpo (29)	Giannis Antetokounmpo (11)	Khris Middleton (5)	Bradley Center; 18,717	28–23
52	February 4	@ Brooklyn	W 109–94	Eric Bledsoe (28)	John Henson (18)	Eric Bledsoe (6)	Barclays Center; 14,392	29–23
53	February 6	@ New York	W 103–89	Antetokounmpo, Bledsoe (23)	Giannis Antetokounmpo (11)	Eric Bledsoe (8)	Madison Square Garden; 19,812	30–23
54	February 9	@ Miami	L 85–91	Giannis Antetokounmpo (23)	Giannis Antetokounmpo (11)	Eric Bledsoe (6)	American Airlines Arena; 20,018	30–24
55	February 10	@ Orlando	W 111–104	Giannis Antetokounmpo (32)	Khris Middleton (9)	Eric Bledsoe (8)	Amway Center; 18,347	31–24
56	February 13	Atlanta	W 97–92	Khris Middleton (21)	Giannis Antetokounmpo (15)	Eric Bledsoe (9)	Bradley Center; 14,720	32–24
57	February 15	Denver	L 123–134	Giannis Antetokounmpo (36)	Giannis Antetokounmpo (11)	Giannis Antetokounmpo (13)	Bradley Center; 15,486	32–25
58	February 23	@ Toronto	W 122–119 (OT)	Giannis Antetokounmpo (26)	Giannis Antetokounmpo (12)	Giannis Antetokounmpo (6)	Air Canada Centre; 20,047	33–25
59	February 25	New Orleans	L 121–123 (OT)	Khris Middleton (25)	Eric Bledsoe (9)	Giannis Antetokounmpo (6)	Bradley Center; 18,717	33–26
60	February 27	Washington	L 104–107	Giannis Antetokounmpo (23)	Giannis Antetokounmpo (13)	Giannis Antetokounmpo (8)	Bradley Center; 16,093	33–27
61	February 28	@ Detroit	L 87–110	Eric Bledsoe (19)	Eric Bledsoe (6)	Eric Bledsoe (4)	Little Caesars Arena; 16,146	33–28

March : 8–7 (home: 4–3; road: 4–4)

Game	Date	Team	Score	High points	High rebounds	High assists	Location Attendance	Record
62	March 2	Indiana	L 96–103	Khris Middleton (30)	Antetokounmpo, Henson (10)	Eric Bledsoe (6)	Bradley Center; 17,217	33–29
63	March 4	Philadelphia	W 118–110	Giannis Antetokounmpo (35)	Giannis Antetokounmpo (9)	Giannis Antetokounmpo (7)	Bradley Center; 15,587	34–29
64	March 5	@ Indiana	L 89–92	Eric Bledsoe (26)	Giannis Antetokounmpo (10)	Giannis Antetokounmpo (12)	Bankers Life Fieldhouse; 15,874	34–30
65	March 7	Houston	L 99–110	Giannis Antetokounmpo (30)	Khris Middleton (12)	Middleton, Terry (5)	Bradley Center; 17,195	34–31
66	March 9	New York	W 120–112	Giannis Antetokounmpo (28)	Giannis Antetokounmpo (10)	Eric Bledsoe (8)	Bradley Center; 18,717	35–31
67	March 12	@ Memphis	W 121–103	Giannis Antetokounmpo (24)	Brandon Jennings (8)	Brandon Jennings (12)	FedExForum; 14,112	36–31
68	March 14	@ Orlando	L 117–126	Giannis Antetokounmpo (33)	Giannis Antetokounmpo (10)	Eric Bledsoe (8)	Amway Center; 17,713	36–32
69	March 17	Atlanta	W 122–117	Giannis Antetokounmpo (33)	Giannis Antetokounmpo (12)	Eric Bledsoe (9)	Bradley Center; 18,717	37–32
70	March 19	@ Cleveland	L 117–124	Giannis Antetokounmpo (37)	Giannis Antetokounmpo (11)	Eric Bledsoe (8)	Quicken Loans Arena; 20,562	37–33
71	March 21	L.A. Clippers	L 120–127	Khris Middleton (23)	John Henson (7)	Eric Bledsoe (8)	Bradley Center; 17,916	37–34
72	March 23	@ Chicago	W 118–105	Shabazz Muhammad (21)	John Henson (12)	Khris Middleton (6)	United Center; 21,698	38–34
73	March 25	San Antonio	W 106–103	Giannis Antetokounmpo (25)	Giannis Antetokounmpo (10)	Eric Bledsoe (5)	Bradley Center; 18,717	39–34
74	March 27	@ L.A. Clippers	L 98–105	Giannis Antetokounmpo (26)	Antetokounmpo, Bledsoe (9)	Giannis Antetokounmpo (7)	Staples Center; 19,068	39–35
75	March 29	@ Golden State	W 116–107	Giannis Antetokounmpo (32)	Tyler Zeller (8)	Eric Bledsoe (6)	Oracle Arena; 19,596	40–35
76	March 30	@ L.A. Lakers	W 124–122 (OT)	Giannis Antetokounmpo (27)	Giannis Antetokounmpo (16)	Eric Bledsoe (6)	Staples Center; 18,997	41–35

April : 3–3 (home: 2–1; road: 1–2)

Game	Date	Team	Score	High points	High rebounds	High assists	Location Attendance	Record
77	April 1	@ Denver	L 125–128 (OT)	Jabari Parker (35)	Giannis Antetokounmpo (12)	Bledsoe, Antetokounmpo (6)	Pepsi Center; 19,520	41–36
78	April 3	Boston	W 106–102	Giannis Antetokounmpo (29)	Giannis Antetokounmpo (11)	Khris Middleton (9)	Bradley Center; 16,188	42–36
79	April 5	Brooklyn	L 111–119	Khris Middleton (31)	Giannis Antetokounmpo (10)	Giannis Antetokounmpo (7)	Bradley Center; 18,378	42–37
80	April 7	@ New York	W 115–102	Bledsoe, Middleton (22)	Henson, Parker (12)	Eric Bledsoe (10)	Madison Square Garden; 19,812	43–37
81	April 9	Orlando	W 102–86	Shabazz Muhammad (22)	Eric Bledsoe (11)	Eric Bledsoe (10)	Bradley Center; 18,717	44–37
82	April 11	@ Philadelphia	L 95–130	Jabari Parker (25)	Giannis Antetokounmpo (10)	Brandon Jennings (5)	Wells Fargo Center; 20,659	44–38

2017–18 season schedule

=== Playoffs ===
2018 playoff game log
Total: 3–4 (home: 3–0; road: 0–4)
First Round: 3–4 (home: 3–0; road: 0–4)

Game	Date	Team	Score	High points	High rebounds	High assists	Location Attendance	Series
1	April 15	@ Boston	L 107–113 (OT)	Giannis Antetokounmpo (35)	Giannis Antetokounmpo (13)	Giannis Antetokounmpo (7)	TD Garden; 18,624	0–1
2	April 17	@ Boston	L 106–120	Giannis Antetokounmpo (35)	Giannis Antetokounmpo (9)	Giannis Antetokounmpo (8)	TD Garden; 18,624	0–2
3	April 20	Boston	W 116–92	Khris Middleton (23)	Khris Middleton (7)	Khris Middleton (7)	Bradley Center; 18,717	1–2
4	April 22	Boston	W 104–102	Giannis Antetokounmpo (27)	Antetokounmpo, Parker (7)	Antetokounmpo, Bledsoe (5)	Bradley Center; 18,717	2–2
5	April 24	@ Boston	L 87–92	Khris Middleton (23)	Giannis Antetokounmpo (10)	Giannis Antetokounmpo (9)	TD Garden; 18,624	2–3
6	April 26	Boston	W 97–86	Giannis Antetokounmpo (31)	Giannis Antetokounmpo (14)	Matthew Dellavedova (6)	Bradley Center; 18,717	3–3
7	April 28	@ Boston	L 96–112	Khris Middleton (32)	Giannis Antetokounmpo (9)	Giannis Antetokounmpo (5)	TD Garden; 18,624	3–4

2018 playoff schedule

== Player statistics ==
Legend
GP	Games played	GS	Games started	MPG	Minutes per game
FG%	Field-goal percentage	3P%	3-point field-goal percentage	FT%	Free-throw percentage
RPG	Rebounds per game	APG	Assists per game	SPG	Steals per game
BPG	Blocks per game	PPG	Points per game

=== Regular season ===
Milwaukee Bucks statistics
Player	GP	GS	MPG	FG%	3P%	FT%	RPG	APG	SPG	BPG	PPG
Khris Middleton	82	82	36.4	.466	.359	.884	5.2	4.0	1.5	.3	20.1
John Henson	76	69	25.9	.572	.143	.570	6.8	1.5	.6	1.4	8.8
Giannis Antetokounmpo	75	75	36.7	.529	.307	.760	10.0	4.8	1.5	1.4	26.9
Tony Snell	75	59	27.4	.435	.403	.792	1.9	1.3	.6	.4	6.9
Thon Maker	74	12	16.7	.411	.298	.699	3.0	.6	.5	.7	4.8
Eric Bledsoe^{†}	71	71	31.5	.476	.349	.795	3.9	5.1	2.0	.6	17.8
Sterling Brown	54	4	14.4	.400	.352	.875	2.6	.5	.6	.2	4.0
Jason Terry	51	4	16.0	.383	.348	.889	.9	1.2	.8	.3	3.3
Malcolm Brogdon	48	20	29.9	.485	.385	.882	3.3	3.2	.9	.3	13.0
Matthew Dellavedova	38	3	18.7	.362	.372	.926	1.7	3.8	.4	.0	4.3
Jabari Parker	31	3	24.0	.482	.383	.741	4.9	1.9	.8	.3	12.6
DeAndre Liggins^{†}	31	1	15.5	.338	.306	.400	1.6	.9	.9	.3	1.8
Tyler Zeller^{†}	24	1	16.9	.590	.000	.895	4.6	.8	.3	.6	5.9
Sean Kilpatrick^{†}	23	0	8.9	.378	.283	.947	1.1	.7	.2	.0	4.0
Rashad Vaughn^{†}	22	0	7.9	.420	.371	.667	.8	.5	.2	.1	2.7
D. J. Wilson	22	0	3.2	.563	.400	.500	.5	.1	.1	.0	1.0
Brandon Jennings	14	0	14.6	.375	.273	1.000	2.2	3.1	.4	.3	5.2
Gary Payton II^{†}	12	6	8.8	.394	.167	.667	1.4	.8	.3	.1	2.5
Shabazz Muhammad^{†}	11	0	10.6	.552	.375	.895	2.8	.6	.4	.1	8.5
Mirza Teletović	10	0	15.9	.439	.467		2.3	1.0	.4	.1	7.1
Marshall Plumlee	8	0	6.5	.333		.750	2.1	.3	.0	.1	1.8
Joel Bolomboy	6	0	6.3	.500	.000	.500	1.7	.0	.3	.0	1.5
Xavier Munford	6	0	3.5	.167	.000	.500	.2	.7	.2	.0	.5
Greg Monroe^{†}	5	0	15.8	.485		.500	5.0	1.0	.0	.0	6.8

=== Playoffs ===
Milwaukee Bucks statistics
Player	GP	GS	MPG	FG%	3P%	FT%	RPG	APG	SPG	BPG	PPG
Giannis Antetokounmpo	7	7	40.0	.570	.286	.691	9.6	6.3	1.4	.9	25.7
Khris Middleton	7	7	39.3	.598	.610	.737	5.1	3.1	.9	.7	24.7
Eric Bledsoe	7	7	32.1	.440	.318	.700	3.6	3.7	1.0	.9	13.6
Malcolm Brogdon	7	5	26.6	.436	.263	.800	3.4	2.4	.1	.0	8.7
Tyler Zeller	7	3	9.4	.800		.750	2.0	.4	.6	.4	1.6
Tony Snell	7	2	19.1	.292	.238		1.9	.6	.4	.6	2.7
Jabari Parker	7	0	23.9	.452	.316	.615	6.1	1.4	1.0	.6	10.0
Thon Maker	6	2	21.7	.393	.300	.714	3.8	.8	.3	1.8	5.5
Matthew Dellavedova	6	0	13.0	.333	.222	1.000	.8	2.7	.3	.0	2.0
Shabazz Muhammad	4	0	7.3	.450	.800	.600	1.0	.0	.5	.3	6.3
Jason Terry	3	0	14.7	.400	.400		.7	.7	.3	.0	2.0
Sterling Brown	3	0	4.3	.600	.333		.7	.0	.3	.0	2.3
John Henson	2	2	37.0	.692		.500	6.0	2.5	.0	3.5	9.5
Brandon Jennings	1	0	5.0	.000	.000	1.000	.0	.0	.0	.0	2.0

- ^{†} Denotes player spent time with another team in the season. Stats reflect time with the Bucks only.

== Transactions ==
=== Trades ===
June 23, 2017	To Milwaukee Bucks Cash considerations	To Los Angeles Clippers Draft rights to Sindarius Thornwell
July 6, 2017	To Milwaukee Bucks Draft rights to Sterling Brown	To Philadelphia 76ers Cash considerations
November 7, 2017	To Milwaukee Bucks Eric Bledsoe	To Phoenix Suns Greg Monroe; 2018 protected first-round pick 2018 protected second-round pick

=== Free agency ===
==== Re-signed ====
Player	Signed
Tony Snell	4-year contract worth $46 million
Jason Terry	1-year contract worth $2.3 million

==== Additions ====
Player	Signed	Former Team
DeAndre Liggins	1-year contract worth $1.5 million	Dallas Mavericks
Gary Payton II	Two-way contract	Milwaukee Bucks
Joel Bolomboy	Two-way contract	Utah Jazz
Sean Kilpatrick	Two-way contract	Brooklyn Nets

==== Subtractions ====
Player	Signed	New Team
Michael Beasley	1-year contract worth $2.1 million	New York Knicks
Spencer Hawes	Waived	
Gary Payton II	Waived	Los Angeles Lakers / South Bay Lakers
