= 2017–18 Toronto Raptors season =

NBA professional basketball team season

- Division champions
- Head coach: Dwane Casey
- General manager: Bobby Webster
- Owners: Maple Leaf Sports & Entertainment
- Arena: Air Canada Centre

Results
- Record: 59–23 (.720)
- Place: Division: 1st (Atlantic); Conference: 1st (Eastern)
- Playoff finish: Conference Semifinals (lost to Cavaliers 0–4)
- Stats at Basketball Reference

Local media
- Television: TSN, Sportsnet

The 2017–18 Toronto Raptors season was the 23rd season of the Canadian franchise in the North American National Basketball Association (NBA).

On June 28, 2017, the Raptors promoted assistant general manager Bobby Webster to general manager, while Masai Ujiri remained team president. Webster's promotion came over a month after their previous general manager, Jeff Weltman, left the Raptors to become the President of Basketball Operations for the Orlando Magic, with the Raptors acquiring a second-round pick in 2018 in order for them to release Weltman early. However they would later trade that selection, their first-round pick, and DeMarre Carroll to the Brooklyn Nets for the rights to Justin Hamilton.

On April 6, 2018, the Raptors set new franchise records for total wins in a season with 57, home wins in a season with 33, and clinched the 1st seed in the Eastern Conference for the first time in franchise history. They would end the season with a record 59 wins and 34 home wins. They would end up winning their 4th division title in 5 years.

In the playoffs, the Raptors faced the eighth seeded Washington Wizards in the first round, winning in six games. They advanced to the semifinals where they faced the Cleveland Cavaliers once again, the team that had eliminated them in the past two NBA playoffs. Just like last season, the Raptors were swept in the second round in four games by the Cavaliers. It is also the third time in four seasons that the Raptors were swept in the playoffs, having been swept by the Washington Wizards in the first round of the 2015 Playoffs. They have now lost 10 straight playoff games to the Cavaliers. This sweep marked the 1st time the top seeded conference team was swept in a playoff series since 2015, where the Atlanta Hawks were also swept by the Cleveland Cavaliers in the conference finals. The Raptors also became the first top-seeded conference team since the Oklahoma City Thunder in 2013 to have not advanced to the conference finals, and the first in NBA history to get swept in the second round.

Following yet another disappointing playoff appearance, head coach Dwane Casey was fired on May 11, 2018.

== Offseason ==
=== Draft ===
Round	Pick	Player	Position	Nationality	College
1	23	OG Anunoby	SF	United Kingdom	Indiana

== Roster ==
2017–18 Toronto Raptors roster
Players

Pos.	No.	Player	Height	Weight	DOB	From
F	3	OG Anunoby	6 ft 8 in (2.03 m)	235 lb (107 kg)	1997–07–17	Indiana
G	4	Lorenzo Brown	6 ft 5 in (1.96 m)	189 lb (86 kg)	1990–08–26	NC State
G	10	DeMar DeRozan	6 ft 7 in (2.01 m)	220 lb (100 kg)	1989–08–07	USC
F	9	Serge Ibaka	7 ft 0 in (2.13 m)	245 lb (111 kg)	1989–09–18	Republic of the Congo
G	7	Kyle Lowry	6 ft 1 in (1.85 m)	195 lb (88 kg)	1986–03–25	Villanova
F	34	Alfonzo McKinnie	6 ft 8 in (2.03 m)	215 lb (98 kg)	1992–09–17	Green Bay
F	0	C. J. Miles	6 ft 6 in (1.98 m)	225 lb (102 kg)	1987–03–18	Skyline HS (TX)
F	13	Malcolm Miller (TW)	6 ft 7 in (2.01 m)	210 lb (95 kg)	1993–03–06	Holy Cross
C	92	Lucas Nogueira	7 ft 0 in (2.13 m)	240 lb (109 kg)	1992–07–26	Brazil
C	42	Jakob Pöltl	7 ft 0 in (2.13 m)	250 lb (113 kg)	1995–10–15	Utah
G	24	Norman Powell	6 ft 5 in (1.96 m)	215 lb (98 kg)	1993–05–25	UCLA
G	22	Malachi Richardson	6 ft 6 in (1.98 m)	205 lb (93 kg)	1996–01–05	Syracuse
F	43	Pascal Siakam	6 ft 9 in (2.06 m)	230 lb (104 kg)	1994–04–02	New Mexico State
C	17	Jonas Valančiūnas	7 ft 0 in (2.13 m)	265 lb (120 kg)	1992–05–06	Lithuania
G	23	Fred VanVleet	6 ft 0 in (1.83 m)	195 lb (88 kg)	1994–02–25	Wichita State
G	55	Delon Wright	6 ft 5 in (1.96 m)	190 lb (86 kg)	1992–04–26	Utah

Coaches
Head coach
- Dwane Casey
Assistant(s)
- Rex Kalamian
- Eric Khoury
- Alex McKechnie
- Jama Mahlalela
- Patrick Mutombo
- Nick Nurse
- Jim Sann

Legend
- (DP) Unsigned draft pick
- (FA) Free agent
- (S) Suspended
- (GL) On assignment to G League affiliate
- (TW) Two-way affiliate player
- Injured

Roster
Updated: 2018–04–11

== Standings ==
=== Division ===
Atlantic Division	W	L	PCT	GB	Home	Road	Div	GP
c – Toronto Raptors	59	23	.720	–	34‍–‍7	25‍–‍16	12–4	82
x – Boston Celtics	55	27	.671	4.0	27‍–‍14	28‍–‍13	12–4	82
x – Philadelphia 76ers	52	30	.634	7.0	30‍–‍11	22‍–‍19	9–7	82
New York Knicks	29	53	.354	30.0	19‍–‍22	10‍–‍31	6–10	82
Brooklyn Nets	28	54	.341	31.0	15‍–‍26	13‍–‍28	1–15	82

=== Conference ===
Eastern Conference
#	Team	W	L	PCT	GB	GP
1	c – Toronto Raptors *	59	23	.720	–	82
2	x – Boston Celtics	55	27	.671	4.0	82
3	x – Philadelphia 76ers	52	30	.634	7.0	82
4	y – Cleveland Cavaliers *	50	32	.610	9.0	82
5	x – Indiana Pacers	48	34	.585	11.0	82
6	y – Miami Heat *	44	38	.537	15.0	82
7	x – Milwaukee Bucks	44	38	.537	15.0	82
8	x – Washington Wizards	43	39	.524	16.0	82
9	Detroit Pistons	39	43	.476	20.0	82
10	Charlotte Hornets	36	46	.439	23.0	82
11	New York Knicks	29	53	.354	30.0	82
12	Brooklyn Nets	28	54	.341	31.0	82
13	Chicago Bulls	27	55	.329	32.0	82
14	Orlando Magic	25	57	.305	34.0	82
15	Atlanta Hawks	24	58	.293	35.0	82

== Game log ==
=== Preseason ===
2017 pre-season game log
Total: 3–2 (home: 1–0; road: 2–2)
Pre-season: 3–2 (home: 1–0; road: 2–2)

Game	Date	Team	Score	High points	High rebounds	High assists	Location Attendance	Record
1	October 1	LA Clippers	W 121–113	Kyle Lowry (17)	Jonas Valančiūnas (10)	3 players (4)	Stan Sheriff Center; 8,018	1–0
2	October 4	@ LA Clippers	L 84–98	DeMar DeRozan (15)	Jonas Valančiūnas (6)	DeMar DeRozan (4)	Stan Sheriff Center; 8,272	1–1
3	October 5	@ Portland	L 101–106	Kyle Lowry (23)	Alfonzo McKinnie (8)	Kyle Lowry (6)	Moda Center; 15,505	1–2
4	October 10	Detroit	W 116–94	C. J. Miles (19)	Jonas Valančiūnas (11)	DeMar DeRozan (8)	Air Canada Centre; 16,893	2–2
5	October 13	@ Chicago	W 125–104	C. J. Miles (27)	Jonas Valančiūnas (10)	Kyle Lowry (6)	United Center; 19,677	3–2

2017–18 season schedule

=== Regular season ===
2017–18 game log
Total: 59–23 (home: 34–7; road: 25–16)
October: 4–2 (home: 2–0; road: 2–2)

Game	Date	Team	Score	High points	High rebounds	High assists	Location Attendance	Record
1	October 19	Chicago	W 117–100	Jonas Valančiūnas (23)	Jonas Valančiūnas (15)	Kyle Lowry (9)	Air Canada Centre; 19,800	1–0
2	October 21	Philadelphia	W 128–94	DeMar DeRozan (30)	Lucas Nogueira (9)	Kyle Lowry (5)	Air Canada Centre; 19,800	2–0
3	October 23	@ San Antonio	L 97–101	DeMar DeRozan (28)	Jakob Poeltl (12)	DeRozan, Powell, Wright (4)	AT&T Center; 18,418	2–1
4	October 25	@ Golden State	L 112–117	DeMar DeRozan (24)	Jakob Poeltl (14)	Kyle Lowry (9)	Oracle Arena; 19,596	2–2
5	October 27	@ L.A. Lakers	W 101–92	DeMar DeRozan (23)	Kyle Lowry (10)	Kyle Lowry (12)	Staples Center; 17,876	3–2
6	October 30	@ Portland	W 99–85	DeMar DeRozan (25)	Kyle Lowry (10)	Kyle Lowry (10)	Moda Center; 18,505	4–2

November : 9–5 (home: 5–1; road: 4–4)

Game	Date	Team	Score	High points	High rebounds	High assists	Location Attendance	Record
7	November 1	@ Denver	L 111–129	Norman Powell (14)	Pascal Siakam (8)	Kyle Lowry (4)	Pepsi Center; 14,072	4–3
8	November 3	@ Utah	W 109–100	DeMar DeRozan (37)	Jonas Valančiūnas (8)	Kyle Lowry (10)	Vivint Smart Home Arena; 16,258	5–3
9	November 5	Washington	L 96–107	DeMar DeRozan (26)	Serge Ibaka (10)	VanVleet, Wright (4)	Air Canada Centre; 19,800	5–4
10	November 7	Chicago	W 119–114	DeMar DeRozan (24)	Jonas Valančiūnas (10)	Kyle Lowry (6)	Air Canada Centre; 19,800	6–4
11	November 9	New Orleans	W 122–118	DeMar DeRozan (33)	Jonas Valančiūnas (13)	DeMar DeRozan (8)	Air Canada Centre; 19,800	7–4
12	November 12	@ Boston	L 94–95	DeMar DeRozan (24)	Lucas Nogueira (7)	Kyle Lowry (7)	TD Garden; 18,624	7–5
13	November 14	@ Houston	W 129–113	DeMar DeRozan (27)	Jonas Valančiūnas (7)	Kyle Lowry (10)	Toyota Center; 18,055	8–5
14	November 15	@ New Orleans	W 125–116	DeMar DeRozan (25)	Kyle Lowry (11)	Kyle Lowry (9)	Smoothie King Center; 15,654	9–5
15	November 17	New York	W 107–84	DeRozan, Lowry (22)	Kyle Lowry (8)	Kyle Lowry (10)	Air Canada Centre; 19,800	10–5
16	November 19	Washington	W 100–91	DeMar DeRozan (33)	Pascal Siakam (9)	DeRozan, Lowry (6)	Air Canada Centre; 19,800	11–5
17	November 22	@ New York	L 100–108	Kyle Lowry (25)	Kyle Lowry (10)	Kyle Lowry (5)	Madison Square Garden; 19,812	11–6
18	November 24	@ Indiana	L 104–107	Kyle Lowry (24)	Kyle Lowry (10)	Kyle Lowry (8)	Bankers Life Fieldhouse; 16,523	11–7
19	November 25	@ Atlanta	W 112–78	Jonas Valančiūnas (16)	Kyle Lowry (13)	DeMar DeRozan (8)	Philips Arena; 12,278	12–7
20	November 29	Charlotte	W 126–113	Kyle Lowry (36)	Serge Ibaka (8)	Fred VanVleet (9)	Air Canada Centre; 19,800	13–7

December : 11–3 (home: 6–0; road: 5–3)

Game	Date	Team	Score	High points	High rebounds	High assists	Location Attendance	Record
21	December 1	Indiana	W 120–115	DeMar DeRozan (26)	Serge Ibaka (8)	Kyle Lowry (8)	Air Canada Centre; 19,800	14–7
22	December 5	Phoenix	W 126–113	DeRozan, Lowry (20)	Jonas Valančiūnas (8)	Kyle Lowry (10)	Air Canada Centre; 19,800	15–7
23	December 8	@ Memphis	W 116–107	DeMar DeRozan (26)	Jonas Valančiūnas (8)	Kyle Lowry (8)	FedEx Forum; 15,417	16–7
24	December 10	@ Sacramento	W 102–87	DeMar DeRozan (25)	Kyle Lowry (12)	DeMar DeRozan (9)	Golden 1 Center; 17,583	17–7
25	December 11	@ L.A. Clippers	L 91–96	Jonas Valančiūnas (23)	Jonas Valančiūnas (15)	DeMar DeRozan (8)	Staples Center; 16,658	17–8
26	December 13	@ Phoenix	W 115–109	DeMar DeRozan (37)	Serge Ibaka (13)	Kyle Lowry (7)	Talking Stick Resort Arena; 15,517	18–8
27	December 15	Brooklyn	W 120–87	DeMar DeRozan (31)	Kyle Lowry (10)	Kyle Lowry (12)	Air Canada Centre; 19,800	19–8
28	December 17	Sacramento	W 108–93	DeMar DeRozan (21)	Jonas Valančiūnas (16)	Kyle Lowry (7)	Air Canada Centre; 19,800	20–8
29	December 20	@ Charlotte	W 129–111	DeMar DeRozan (28)	Jakob Poeltl (8)	DeRozan, Lowry (8)	Spectrum Center; 15,023	21–8
30	December 21	@ Philadelphia	W 114–109	DeMar DeRozan (45)	Kyle Lowry (9)	Lowry, Wright (4)	Wells Fargo Center; 20,680	22–8
31	December 23	Philadelphia	W 102–86	DeMar DeRozan (29)	Anunoby, Ibaka, Valančiūnas (6)	Kyle Lowry (5)	Air Canada Centre; 19,800	23–8
32	December 26	@ Dallas	L 93–98	Kyle Lowry (23)	Serge Ibaka (12)	Kyle Lowry (6)	American Airlines Center; 20,005	23–9
33	December 27	@ Oklahoma City	L 107–124	Jonas Valančiūnas (16)	DeRozan, Poeltl (6)	Kyle Lowry (10)	Chesapeake Energy Arena; 18,203	23–10
34	December 29	Atlanta	W 111–98	DeMar DeRozan (25)	Jonas Valančiūnas (11)	DeRozan, Lowry (5)	Air Canada Centre; 19,800	24–10

January : 10–5 (home: 6–3; road: 4–2)

Game	Date	Team	Score	High points	High rebounds	High assists	Location Attendance	Record
35	January 1	Milwaukee	W 131–127 (OT)	DeMar DeRozan (52)	Serge Ibaka (8)	DeMar DeRozan (8)	Air Canada Centre; 19,800	25–10
36	January 3	@ Chicago	W 124–115	DeMar DeRozan (35)	Delon Wright (13)	DeMar DeRozan (6)	United Center; 20,056	26–10
37	January 5	@ Milwaukee	W 129–110	Serge Ibaka (21)	Jonas Valančiūnas (13)	Delon Wright (7)	Bradley Center; 18,717	27–10
38	January 8	@ Brooklyn	W 114–113 (OT)	DeMar DeRozan (35)	Jonas Valančiūnas (13)	Kyle Lowry (11)	Barclays Center; 13,681	28–10
39	January 9	Miami	L 89–90	DeMar DeRozan (25)	Delon Wright (7)	DeMar DeRozan (6)	Air Canada Centre; 19,800	28–11
40	January 11	Cleveland	W 133–99	Fred VanVleet (22)	Jonas Valančiūnas (18)	DeMar DeRozan (8)	Air Canada Centre; 19,923	29–11
41	January 13	Golden State	L 125–127	DeMar DeRozan (42)	Jonas Valančiūnas (9)	Fred VanVleet (4)	Air Canada Centre; 20,078	29–12
42	January 15	@ Philadelphia	L 111–117	DeMar DeRozan (24)	Jakob Poeltl (8)	DeMar DeRozan (5)	Wells Fargo Center; 20,637	29–13
43	January 17	Detroit	W 96–91	C.J Miles (21)	Jonas Valančiūnas (16)	Lowry, DeRozan, Wright (5)	Air Canada Centre; 19,800	30–13
44	January 19	San Antonio	W 86–83	Kyle Lowry (24)	Jonas Valančiūnas (11)	DeMar DeRozan (6)	Air Canada Centre; 19,800	31–13
45	January 20	@ Minnesota	L 109–115	Kyle Lowry (40)	Delon Wright (6)	Delon Wright (6)	Target Center; 17,828	31–14
46	January 24	@ Atlanta	W 108–93	Fred VanVleet (19)	Jonas Valančiūnas (13)	Fred VanVleet (5)	Philips Arena; 12,780	32–14
47	January 26	Utah	L 93–97	Jonas Valančiūnas (28)	Jonas Valančiūnas (14)	DeMar DeRozan (8)	Air Canada Centre; 19,800	32–15
48	January 28	L.A. Lakers	W 123–111	Fred VanVleet (25)	Kyle Lowry (11)	DeMar DeRozan (7)	Air Canada Centre; 19,800	33–15
49	January 30	Minnesota	W 109–104	DeMar DeRozan (23)	Jonas Valančiūnas (11)	Kyle Lowry (9)	Air Canada Centre; 19,800	34–15

February : 9–2 (home: 6–1; road: 3–1)

Game	Date	Team	Score	High points	High rebounds	High assists	Location Attendance	Record
50	February 1	@ Washington	L 119–122	Kyle Lowry (29)	Jonas Valančiūnas (6)	DeMar DeRozan (6)	Capital One Arena; 15,599	34–16
51	February 2	Portland	W 130–105	DeMar DeRozan (35)	Jonas Valančiūnas (8)	Kyle Lowry (5)	Air Canada Centre; 19,800	35–16
52	February 4	Memphis	W 101–86	Delon Wright (15)	Jonas Valančiūnas (9)	Fred VanVleet (8)	Air Canada Centre; 19,800	36–16
53	February 6	Boston	W 111–91	Kyle Lowry (23)	Kyle Lowry (8)	Fred VanVleet (8)	Air Canada Centre; 20,017	37–16
54	February 8	New York	W 113–88	Jonas Valančiūnas (18)	Jonas Valančiūnas (10)	Siakam, VanVleet (6)	Air Canada Centre; 19,800	38–16
55	February 11	@ Charlotte	W 123–103	DeMar DeRozan (25)	Jonas Valančiūnas (9)	DeMar DeRozan (8)	Spectrum Center; 15,023	39–16
56	February 13	Miami	W 115–112	DeMar DeRozan (27)	Valančiūnas, Ibaka (10)	Kyle Lowry (8)	Air Canada Centre; 19,800	40–16
57	February 14	@ Chicago	W 122–98	Lowry, Ibaka (20)	Jonas Valančiūnas (9)	Kyle Lowry (10)	United Center; 21,006	41–16
All-Star Break
58	February 23	Milwaukee	L 119–122 (OT)	DeMar DeRozan (33)	DeRozan, Valančiūnas (7)	Kyle Lowry (8)	Air Canada Centre; 20,047	41–17
59	February 26	Detroit	W 123–94	Lowry, DeRozan (20)	Serge Ibaka (9)	DeMar DeRozan (7)	Air Canada Centre; 19,800	42–17
60	February 28	@ Orlando	W 117–104	DeMar DeRozan (21)	Jakob Poeltl (8)	Kyle Lowry (11)	Amway Center; 17,328	43–17

March : 12–4 (home: 6–2; road: 6–2)

Game	Date	Team	Score	High points	High rebounds	High assists	Location Attendance	Record
61	March 2	@ Washington	W 102–95	DeMar DeRozan (23)	Kyle Lowry (7)	Kyle Lowry (5)	Capital One Arena; 18,631	44–17
62	March 4	Charlotte	W 103–98	DeMar DeRozan (19)	Jonas Valančiūnas (13)	DeMar DeRozan (8)	Air Canada Centre; 19,800	45–17
63	March 6	Atlanta	W 106–90	DeMar DeRozan (25)	Jakob Poeltl (9)	VanVleet, Lowry (7)	Air Canada Centre; 19,800	46–17
64	March 7	@ Detroit	W 121–119 (OT)	DeMar DeRozan (42)	Jonas Valančiūnas (11)	Kyle Lowry (15)	Little Caesars Arena; 17,769	47–17
65	March 9	Houston	W 108–105	Kyle Lowry (30)	Jonas Valančiūnas (10)	Kyle Lowry (6)	Air Canada Centre; 20,131	48–17
66	March 11	@ New York	W 132–106	Jonas Valančiūnas (17)	Jonas Valančiūnas (9)	Kyle Lowry (7)	Madison Square Garden; 19,812	49–17
67	March 13	@ Brooklyn	W 116–102	Jonas Valančiūnas (26)	Jonas Valančiūnas (14)	Kyle Lowry (11)	Barclays Center; 16,654	50–17
68	March 15	@ Indiana	W 106–99	DeMar DeRozan (24)	Jonas Valančiūnas (17)	DeMar DeRozan (7)	Bankers Life Fieldhouse; 17,923	51–17
69	March 16	Dallas	W 122–115 (OT)	DeMar DeRozan (29)	Jonas Valančiūnas (12)	Fred VanVleet (8)	Air Canada Centre; 19,800	52–17
70	March 18	Oklahoma City	L 125–132	DeMar DeRozan (24)	Serge Ibaka (6)	Kyle Lowry (10)	Air Canada Centre; 19,800	52–18
71	March 20	@ Orlando	W 93–86	Kyle Lowry (25)	Jonas Valančiūnas (8)	Kyle Lowry (8)	Amway Center; 16,228	53–18
72	March 21	@ Cleveland	L 129–132	Kyle Lowry (24)	Poeltl, Valančiūnas (8)	Kyle Lowry (7)	Quicken Loans Arena; 20,562	53–19
73	March 23	Brooklyn	W 116–112	Kyle Lowry (25)	Kyle Lowry (10)	Kyle Lowry (12)	Air Canada Centre; 19,800	54–19
74	March 25	L.A. Clippers	L 106–117	Valančiūnas, VanVleet (16)	Jonas Valančiūnas (16)	Kyle Lowry (8)	Air Canada Centre; 19,800	54–20
75	March 27	Denver	W 114–110	DeRozan, Valančiūnas, VanVleet (15)	Jakob Poeltl (8)	DeRozan, Lowry (8)	Air Canada Centre; 19,800	55–20
76	March 31	@ Boston	L 99–110	DeMar DeRozan (32)	Ibaka, Valančiūnas (10)	Kyle Lowry (9)	TD Garden; 18,624	55–21

April : 4–2 (home: 3–0; road: 1–2)

Game	Date	Team	Score	High points	High rebounds	High assists	Location Attendance	Record
77	April 3	@ Cleveland	L 106–112	DeMar DeRozan (19)	Serge Ibaka (12)	DeMar DeRozan (7)	Quicken Loans Arena; 20,562	55–22
78	April 4	Boston	W 96–78	DeMar DeRozan (16)	Delon Wright (9)	Kyle Lowry (5)	Air Canada Centre; 19,963	56–22
79	April 6	Indiana	W 92–73	Serge Ibaka (25)	Jonas Valančiūnas (12)	Kyle Lowry (9)	Air Canada Centre; 19,924	57–22
80	April 8	Orlando	W 112–101	C. J. Miles (22)	Pascal Siakam (9)	Kyle Lowry (7)	Air Canada Centre; 19,948	58–22
81	April 9	@ Detroit	W 108–98	Jonas Valančiūnas (25)	Jonas Valančiūnas (9)	Kyle Lowry (9)	Little Caesars Arena; 17,529	59–22
82	April 11	@ Miami	L 109–116 (OT)	Kyle Lowry (28)	Jakob Poeltl (12)	Kyle Lowry (9)	American Airlines Arena; 19,600	59–23

2017–18 season schedule

=== Playoffs ===
2018 playoff game log
Total: 4–6 (home: 3–2; road: 1–4)
First round: 4–2 (home: 3–0; road: 1–2)

Game	Date	Team	Score	High points	High rebounds	High assists	Location Attendance	Series
1	April 14	Washington	W 114–106	Serge Ibaka (23)	Serge Ibaka (12)	Kyle Lowry (9)	Air Canada Centre; 19,937	1–0
2	April 17	Washington	W 130–119	DeMar DeRozan (37)	Jonas Valančiūnas (14)	Kyle Lowry (12)	Air Canada Centre; 20,242	2–0
3	April 20	@ Washington	L 103–122	DeMar DeRozan (23)	Serge Ibaka (6)	Kyle Lowry (8)	Capital One Arena; 20,356	2–1
4	April 22	@ Washington	L 98–106	DeMar DeRozan (35)	Serge Ibaka (10)	DeMar DeRozan (6)	Capital One Arena; 20,356	2–2
5	April 25	Washington	W 108–98	DeMar DeRozan (32)	Jonas Valančiūnas (13)	Kyle Lowry (10)	Air Canada Centre; 19,987	3–2
6	April 27	@ Washington	W 102–92	Kyle Lowry (24)	Jonas Valančiūnas (12)	Kyle Lowry (6)	Capital One Arena; 20,356	4–2

Conference Semifinals: 0–4 (home: 0–2; road: 0–2)

Game	Date	Team	Score	High points	High rebounds	High assists	Location Attendance	Series
1	May 1	Cleveland	L 112–113 (OT)	DeMar DeRozan (22)	Jonas Valančiūnas (21)	Kyle Lowry (10)	Air Canada Centre; 19,954	0–1
2	May 3	Cleveland	L 110–128	DeMar DeRozan (24)	Jonas Valančiūnas (12)	Kyle Lowry (8)	Air Canada Centre; 20,127	0–2
3	May 5	@ Cleveland	L 103–105	Kyle Lowry (27)	Jonas Valančiūnas (11)	Kyle Lowry (7)	Quicken Loans Arena; 20,562	0–3
4	May 7	@ Cleveland	L 93–128	Jonas Valančiūnas (18)	DeRozan, Valančiūnas (5)	Kyle Lowry (10)	Quicken Loans Arena; 20,562	0–4

2018 playoff schedule

== Player statistics ==
=== Regular season ===
Player	POS	GP	GS	MP	REB	AST	STL	BLK	PTS	MPG	RPG	APG	SPG	BPG	PPG
Jakob Pöltl	C	82	0	1,524	393	57	39	100	567	18.6	4.8	.7	.5	1.2	6.9
Pascal Siakam	PF	81	5	1,679	364	159	62	42	589	20.7	4.5	2.0	.8	.5	7.3
DeMar DeRozan	SG	80	80	2,711	315	417	85	22	1,840	33.9	3.9	5.2	1.1	.3	23.0
Kyle Lowry	PG	78	78	2,510	434	537	85	19	1,267	32.2	5.6	6.9	1.1	.2	16.2
Jonas Valančiūnas	C	77	77	1,727	660	81	29	69	980	22.4	8.6	1.1	.4	.9	12.7
Serge Ibaka	PF	76	76	2,093	478	62	29	99	959	27.5	6.3	.8	.4	1.3	12.6
Fred VanVleet	PG	76	0	1,520	184	243	68	19	656	20.0	2.4	3.2	.9	.3	8.6
OG Anunoby	SF	74	62	1,481	184	55	52	14	438	20.0	2.5	.7	.7	.2	5.9
Norman Powell	SG	70	18	1,062	119	89	37	16	385	15.2	1.7	1.3	.5	.2	5.5
C. J. Miles	SF	70	3	1,337	152	55	37	21	699	19.1	2.2	.8	.5	.3	10.0
Delon Wright	PG	69	4	1,433	198	200	72	33	555	20.8	2.9	2.9	1.0	.5	8.0
Lucas Nogueira	C	49	3	418	87	22	23	43	122	8.5	1.8	.4	.5	.9	2.5
Malcolm Miller	SF	15	4	126	15	3	1	2	38	8.4	1.0	.2	.1	.1	2.5
Lorenzo Brown	PG	14	0	139	15	13	5	0	32	9.9	1.1	.9	.4	.0	2.3
Alfonzo McKinnie	SF	14	0	53	7	1	1	1	21	3.8	.5	.1	.1	.1	1.5
Bruno Caboclo^{†}	SF	2	0	7	1	1	1	0	0	3.5	.5	.5	.5	.0	.0
Nigel Hayes-Davis^{†}	SF	2	0	6	0	0	0	0	6	3.0	.0	.0	.0	.0	3.0
Malachi Richardson^{†}	SG	1	0	5	1	0	0	0	2	5.0	1.0	.0	.0	.0	2.0

- ^{†} Denotes player spent time with another team in the season. Stats reflect time with the Raptors only.

=== Playoffs ===
Player	POS	GP	GS	MP	REB	AST	STL	BLK	PTS	MPG	RPG	APG	SPG	BPG	PPG
Kyle Lowry	PG	10	10	361	43	85	15	0	174	36.1	4.3	8.5	1.5	.0	17.4
DeMar DeRozan	SG	10	10	354	36	40	5	6	227	35.4	3.6	4.0	.5	.6	22.7
OG Anunoby	SF	10	10	238	21	7	6	4	79	23.8	2.1	.7	.6	.4	7.9
Serge Ibaka	PF	10	9	260	59	11	1	13	87	26.0	5.9	1.1	.1	1.3	8.7
Jonas Valančiūnas	C	10	9	244	105	12	4	15	146	24.4	10.5	1.2	.4	1.5	14.6
C. J. Miles	SF	10	1	227	24	8	7	3	96	22.7	2.4	.8	.7	.3	9.6
Delon Wright	PG	10	0	215	22	23	15	9	86	21.5	2.2	2.3	1.5	.9	8.6
Pascal Siakam	PF	10	0	179	36	8	1	6	66	17.9	3.6	.8	.1	.6	6.6
Jakob Pöltl	C	9	0	140	36	6	3	4	49	15.6	4.0	.7	.3	.4	5.4
Fred VanVleet	PG	6	1	114	10	13	0	0	41	19.0	1.7	2.2	.0	.0	6.8
Norman Powell	SG	6	0	40	2	2	0	0	12	6.7	.3	.3	.0	.0	2.0
Lucas Nogueira	C	5	0	24	1	1	0	0	1	4.8	.2	.2	.0	.0	.2
Lorenzo Brown	PG	4	0	29	6	2	0	1	9	7.3	1.5	.5	.0	.3	2.3

== Transactions ==
=== Free agency ===
==== Trades ====
May 25, 2017	To Toronto Raptors Least favorable 2018 second-round pick	To Orlando Magic Jeff Weltman (President of Basketball Operations)
July 8, 2017	To Toronto Raptors Justin Hamilton	To Brooklyn Nets DeMarre Carroll; 2018 first-round pick 2018 second-round pick
July 14, 2017	To Toronto Raptors Draft rights to Emir Preldžić; C. J. Miles	To Indiana Pacers Cory Joseph

==== Re-signed ====
Player	Signed	Contract
Kyle Lowry	July 7, 2017	3-yr/$90M
Serge Ibaka	July 7, 2017	3-yr/$64M

==== Additions ====
Player	Signed	Contract	Former team
Alfonzo McKinnie	July 9, 2017		Windy City Bulls (G League)
Malcolm Miller	July 9, 2017	Two-way contract	(Germany) Alba Berlin
Lorenzo Brown	July 25, 2017	Two-way contract	Grand Rapids Drive (G League)
K. J. McDaniels	August 22, 2017		Brooklyn Nets

==== Subtractions ====
Player	Reason	New Team
P. J. Tucker	Unrestricted free agent	Houston Rockets
Patrick Patterson	Unrestricted free agent	Oklahoma City Thunder
K. J. McDaniels	Waived	Grand Rapids Drive
