= 2017–18 Indiana Pacers season =

NBA professional basketball team season

- Head coach: Nate McMillan
- President: Kevin Pritchard
- General manager: Chad Buchanan
- Owners: Herbert Simon
- Arena: Bankers Life Fieldhouse

Results
- Record: 48–34 (.585)
- Place: Division: 2nd (Central); Conference: 5th (Eastern)
- Playoff finish: First Round (lost to Cavaliers 3–4)
- Stats at Basketball Reference

Local media
- Television: Fox Sports Indiana
- Radio: 1070 The Fan

The 2017–18 Indiana Pacers season was Indiana's 51st season as a franchise and 42nd season in the NBA. For the first time since 2010, Paul George was not on the team's roster as he was traded to the Oklahoma City Thunder in the previous off-season. Despite that, the Pacers improved on their previous year's record and clinched a playoff berth for the third straight season. Their season featured the emergence of Victor Oladipo, who the Pacers received as part of the trade for George.

The Pacers finished the regular season with a record of 48–34, which clinched the 5th seed in the Eastern Conference. In the playoffs, the Pacers faced the 4th seeded Cleveland Cavaliers, who had previously swept the Pacers in the first round of the 2017 NBA Playoffs. The Pacers were once again defeated in the first round, losing to the Cavaliers in seven games.

== NBA draft ==
Round	Pick	Player	Position	Nationality	College
1	18	T. J. Leaf	PF	Israel	UCLA
2	47	Ike Anigbogu	C	United States	UCLA
2	52	Edmond Sumner	PG	United States	Xavier

T. J. Leaf and Ike Anigbogu were both considered first-round picks of the draft who were also teammates in their sole seasons at UCLA. Leaf was their starting power forward and that led the team in scoring with 16.3 points per game, while also averaging 8.2 rebounds 2.4 assists, and 1.1 blocks per game as a starting. Leaf was also named a member of the All-Pac-12 First Team and All-Pac-12 Freshman Team. Anigbogu was a backup center for UCLA and averaged 4.7 points, 4.0 rebounds, and 1.2 blocks in 13 minutes of action per game; he was projected as a potential first-round pick for his athleticism and defensive capabilities. He dropped to the later half of the second round possibly due to a knee injury he sustained during a Pacers pre-draft workout. The Pacers selected Edmond Sumner as their final pick of the draft, a point guard who was also rehabilitating himself from a knee injury during the NBA draft process. In his junior season, Sumner was then the second leading scorer for Xavier but failed to complete the season after suffering a serious knee injury on a January 29, 2017 in a win against St. John's University. He averaged 14.3 points, 4.8 assists, and 4.2 rebounds per game with the Musketeers in his final year. Edmond became the first ever Pacer in franchise history to sign a two-way contract.

== Roster ==
2017–18 Indiana Pacers roster
Players

Pos.	No.	Player	Height	Weight	DOB	From
C	13	Ike Anigbogu	6 ft 11 in (2.11 m)	262 lb (119 kg)	1998–10–22	UCLA
F	44	Bojan Bogdanović	6 ft 8 in (2.03 m)	230 lb (104 kg)	1989–04–18	Croatia
F	20	Trevor Booker	6 ft 8 in (2.03 m)	228 lb (103 kg)	1987–11–25	Clemson
G	2	Darren Collison	6 ft 2 in (1.88 m)	185 lb (84 kg)	1987–08–23	UCLA
C	25	Al Jefferson	6 ft 10 in (2.08 m)	280 lb (127 kg)	1985–01–04	Prentiss HS (MS)
G	6	Cory Joseph	6 ft 3 in (1.91 m)	190 lb (86 kg)	1991–08–20	Texas
F	22	T. J. Leaf	6 ft 10 in (2.08 m)	230 lb (104 kg)	1997–04–30	UCLA
F	26	Ben Moore (TW)	6 ft 8 in (2.03 m)	220 lb (100 kg)	1995–05–13	SMU
G	4	Victor Oladipo	6 ft 4 in (1.93 m)	210 lb (95 kg)	1992–05–04	Indiana
F	0	Alex Poythress	6 ft 9 in (2.06 m)	235 lb (107 kg)	1993–09–06	Kentucky
G/F	40	Glenn Robinson	6 ft 7 in (2.01 m)	215 lb (98 kg)	1994–01–08	Michigan
F/C	11	Domantas Sabonis	6 ft 11 in (2.11 m)	252 lb (114 kg)	1996–05–03	Gonzaga
G	1	Lance Stephenson	6 ft 6 in (1.98 m)	230 lb (104 kg)	1990–09–05	Cincinnati
G	5	Edmond Sumner (TW)	6 ft 5 in (1.96 m)	188 lb (85 kg)	1995–12–31	Xavier
C	33	Myles Turner	7 ft 0 in (2.13 m)	255 lb (116 kg)	1996–03–24	Texas
G	3	Joe Young	6 ft 2 in (1.88 m)	185 lb (84 kg)	1992–06–27	Oregon
F	21	Thaddeus Young	6 ft 8 in (2.03 m)	230 lb (104 kg)	1988–06–21	Georgia Tech

Coaches
Head coach
- Nate McMillan
Assistant(s)
- Bill Bayno
- Dan Burke
- Popeye Jones
- David McClure (player development)

Legend
- (DP) Unsigned draft pick
- (FA) Free agent
- (S) Suspended
- (GL) On assignment to G League affiliate
- (TW) Two-way affiliate player
- Injured

Roster
Updated: 2018–04–04

== Standings ==
=== Division ===
Central Division	W	L	PCT	GB	Home	Road	Div	GP
y – Cleveland Cavaliers	50	32	.610	–	29‍–‍12	21‍–‍20	11–5	82
x – Indiana Pacers	48	34	.585	2.0	27‍–‍14	21‍–‍20	10–6	82
x – Milwaukee Bucks	44	38	.537	6.0	25‍–‍16	19‍–‍22	6–10	82
Detroit Pistons	39	43	.476	11.0	25‍–‍16	14‍–‍27	9–7	82
Chicago Bulls	27	55	.329	23.0	17‍–‍24	10‍–‍31	4–12	82

=== Conference ===
Eastern Conference
#	Team	W	L	PCT	GB	GP
1	c – Toronto Raptors *	59	23	.720	–	82
2	x – Boston Celtics	55	27	.671	4.0	82
3	x – Philadelphia 76ers	52	30	.634	7.0	82
4	y – Cleveland Cavaliers *	50	32	.610	9.0	82
5	x – Indiana Pacers	48	34	.585	11.0	82
6	y – Miami Heat *	44	38	.537	15.0	82
7	x – Milwaukee Bucks	44	38	.537	15.0	82
8	x – Washington Wizards	43	39	.524	16.0	82
9	Detroit Pistons	39	43	.476	20.0	82
10	Charlotte Hornets	36	46	.439	23.0	82
11	New York Knicks	29	53	.354	30.0	82
12	Brooklyn Nets	28	54	.341	31.0	82
13	Chicago Bulls	27	55	.329	32.0	82
14	Orlando Magic	25	57	.305	34.0	82
15	Atlanta Hawks	24	58	.293	35.0	82

== Game log ==
=== Preseason ===
2017 pre-season game log
Total: 3–1 (home: 1–0; road: 2–1)
Pre-season: 3–1 (home: 1–0; road: 2–1)

Game	Date	Team	Score	High points	High rebounds	High assists	Location Attendance	Record
1	October 4	@ Milwaukee	W 104–86	Lance Stephenson (17)	Myles Turner (9)	Lance Stephenson (6)	Bradley Center; 6,691	1–0
2	October 6	@ Cleveland	W 106–102	T. J. Leaf (18)	Thaddeus Young (8)	Joseph, Oladipo (5)	Quicken Loans Arena; 19,432	2–0
3	October 9	@ Detroit	L 97–107	Damien Wilkins (14)	Jarrod Uthoff (7)	Joe Young (5)	Little Caesars Arena; 12,721	2–1
4	October 10	Maccabi Haifa	W 108–89	Victor Oladipo (18)	Domantas Sabonis (13)	Cory Joseph (5)	Bankers Life Fieldhouse; 9,110	3–1

2017–18 season schedule

=== Regular season ===
2017–18 game log
Total: 48–34 (home: 27–14; road: 21–20)
October: 4–3 (home: 3–1; road: 1–2)

Game	Date	Team	Score	High points	High rebounds	High assists	Location Attendance	Record
1	October 18	Brooklyn	W 140–131	Victor Oladipo (22)	Myles Turner (14)	Darren Collison (11)	Bankers Life Fieldhouse; 15,008	1–0
2	October 20	Portland	L 96–114	Leaf, Oladipo (17)	Domantas Sabonis (8)	Darren Collison (4)	Bankers Life Fieldhouse; 15,325	1–1
3	October 21	@ Miami	L 108–112	Victor Oladipo (28)	Domantas Sabonis (12)	Darren Collison (8)	AmericanAirlines Arena; 19,600	1–2
4	October 24	@ Minnesota	W 130–107	Victor Oladipo (28)	Domantas Sabonis (11)	Darren Collison (16)	Target Center; 14,353	2–2
5	October 25	@ Oklahoma City	L 96–114	Victor Oladipo (35)	Domantas Sabonis (11)	Darren Collison (3)	Chesapeake Energy Arena; 18,203	2–3
6	October 29	San Antonio	W 97–94	Victor Oladipo (23)	Domantas Sabonis (12)	Darren Collison (6)	Bankers Life Fieldhouse; 15,013	3–3
7	October 31	Sacramento	W 101–83	Bojan Bogdanovic (17)	Domantas Sabonis (16)	Sabonis, Stephenson (5)	Bankers Life Fieldhouse; 12,245	4–3

November : 8–7 (home: 3–3; road: 5–4)

Game	Date	Team	Score	High points	High rebounds	High assists	Location Attendance	Record
8	November 1	@ Cleveland	W 124–107	Thaddeus Young (26)	Domantas Sabonis (12)	Darren Collison (8)	Quicken Loans Arena; 20,562	5–3
9	November 3	@ Philadelphia	L 110–121	Victor Oladipo (31)	Myles Turner (9)	Victor Oladipo (7)	Wells Fargo Center; 20,668	5–4
10	November 5	@ New York	L 101–108	Thaddeus Young (18)	Domantas Sabonis (8)	Darren Collison (10)	Madison Square Garden; 17,889	5–5
11	November 7	New Orleans	L 112–117	Myles Turner (21)	Myles Turner (12)	Darren Collison (6)	Bankers Life Fieldhouse; 15,014	5–6
12	November 8	@ Detroit	L 97–114	Victor Oladipo (21)	Bojan Bogdanovic (7)	Cory Joseph (6)	Little Caesars Arena; 14,407	5–7
13	November 10	@ Chicago	W 105–87	Victor Oladipo (26)	Sabonis, Turner (9)	Darren Collison (7)	United Center; 22,416	6–7
14	November 12	Houston	L 95–118	Victor Oladipo (28)	Lance Stephenson (10)	Joseph, Stephenson (3)	Bankers Life Fieldhouse; 15,581	6–8
15	November 15	@ Memphis	W 116–113	Darren Collison (30)	Lance Stephenson (7)	Darren Collison (8)	FedExForum; 16,033	7–8
16	November 17	Detroit	W 107–100	Victor Oladipo (21)	Victor Oladipo (15)	Darren Collison (6)	Bankers Life Fieldhouse; 17,188	8–8
17	November 19	@ Miami	W 120–95	Bojan Bogdanovic (26)	Domantas Sabonis (10)	Darren Collison (10)	AmericanAirlines Arena; 19,600	9–8
18	November 20	@ Orlando	W 105–97	Victor Oladipo (29)	Lance Stephenson (10)	Darren Collison (8)	Amway Center; 17,239	10–8
19	November 24	Toronto	W 107–104	Victor Oladipo (21)	Myles Turner (10)	Darren Collison (8)	Bankers Life Fieldhouse; 16,523	11–8
20	November 25	Boston	L 98–108	Myles Turner (19)	Sabonis, Stephenson (8)	Collison, Stephenson (5)	Bankers Life Fieldhouse; 16,303	11–9
21	November 27	Orlando	W 121–109	Victor Oladipo (26)	Sabonis, Stephenson (8)	Oladipo, Sabonis, Stephenson, Young (5)	Bankers Life Fieldhouse; 12,501	12–9
22	November 29	@ Houston	L 97–118	Thaddeus Young (23)	Myles Turner (10)	Collison, Oladipo (5)	Toyota Center; 16,760	12–10

December : 7–8 (home: 5–5; road: 2–3)

Game	Date	Team	Score	High points	High rebounds	High assists	Location Attendance	Record
23	December 1	@ Toronto	L 115–120	Victor Oladipo (36)	Domantas Sabonis (8)	Collison, Oladipo (6)	Air Canada Centre; 19,800	12–11
24	December 4	New York	W 115–97	Thaddeus Young (20)	Domantas Sabonis (12)	Darren Collison (10)	Bankers Life Fieldhouse; 12,018	13–11
25	December 6	Chicago	W 98–96	Victor Oladipo (27)	Thaddeus Young (9)	Darren Collison (6)	Bankers Life Fieldhouse; 13,013	14–11
26	December 8	Cleveland	W 106–102	Victor Oladipo (33)	Domantas Sabonis (9)	Victor Oladipo (5)	Bankers Life Fieldhouse; 17,032	15–11
27	December 10	Denver	W 126–116 (OT)	Victor Oladipo (47)	Myles Turner (8)	Oladipo, Stephenson (6)	Bankers Life Fieldhouse; 14,587	16–11
28	December 13	Oklahoma City	L 95–100	Victor Oladipo (19)	Thaddeus Young (10)	Victor Oladipo (6)	Bankers Life Fieldhouse; 17,923	16–12
29	December 15	Detroit	L 98–104	Victor Oladipo (26)	Oladipo, Stephenson, Turner, Young (8)	Lance Stephenson (5)	Bankers Life Fieldhouse; 18,165	16–13
30	December 17	@ Brooklyn	W 109–97	Victor Oladipo (26)	Domantas Sabonis (8)	Darren Collison (7)	Barclays Center; 13,934	17–13
31	December 18	Boston	L 111–112	Victor Oladipo (38)	Domantas Sabonis (7)	Joseph, Stephenson (3)	Bankers Life Fieldhouse; 16,055	17–14
32	December 20	@ Atlanta	W 105–95	Victor Oladipo (23)	Stephenson, Young (8)	Lance Stephenson (6)	Philips Arena; 14,830	18–14
33	December 23	Brooklyn	W 123–119 (OT)	Victor Oladipo (38)	Sabonis, Turner (9)	Darren Collison (9)	Bankers Life Fieldhouse; 18,165	19–14
34	December 26	@ Detroit	L 83–107	Victor Oladipo (13)	Lance Stephenson (6)	Oladipo, Sabonis, Stephenson, Turner (3)	Little Caesars Arena; 20,451	19–15
35	December 27	Dallas	L 94–98	Collison, Stephenson, Turner (16)	Lance Stephenson (15)	Darren Collison (7)	Bankers Life Fieldhouse; 17,923	19–16
36	December 29	@ Chicago	L 107–119	Darren Collison (30)	Sabonis, Stephenson (9)	Darren Collison (6)	United Center; 21,178	19–17
37	December 31	Minnesota	L 90–107	Joe Young (20)	Domantas Sabonis (11)	Cory Joseph (4)	Bankers Life Fieldhouse; 17,923	19–18

January : 10–5 (home: 7–1; road: 3–4)

Game	Date	Team	Score	High points	High rebounds	High assists	Location Attendance	Record
38	January 3	@ Milwaukee	L 101–122	Domantas Sabonis (24)	Joseph, Stephenson (7)	Cory Joseph (6)	BMO Harris Bradley Center; 15,613	19–19
39	January 6	Chicago	W 125–86	Victor Oladipo (23)	Cory Joseph (10)	Victor Oladipo (9)	Bankers Life Fieldhouse; 17,923	20–19
40	January 8	Milwaukee	W 109–96	Domantas Sabonis (17)	Domantas Sabonis (10)	Darren Collison (7)	Bankers Life Fieldhouse; 14,670	21–19
41	January 10	Miami	L 106–114	Victor Oladipo (26)	Thaddeus Young (9)	Oladipo, Stephenson (4)	Bankers Life Fieldhouse; 14,540	21–20
42	January 12	Cleveland	W 97–95	Darren Collison (22)	Myles Turner (15)	Collison, Stephenson (4)	Bankers Life Fieldhouse; 17,923	22–20
43	January 14	@ Phoenix	W 120–97	Darren Collison (19)	Domantas Sabonis (14)	Cory Joseph (6)	Talking Stick Resort Arena; 17,091	23–20
44	January 15	@ Utah	W 109–94	Victor Oladipo (28)	Al Jefferson (10)	Collison, Oladipo (6)	Vivint Smart Home Arena; 18,306	24–20
45	January 18	@ Portland	L 86–100	Collison, Oladipo (23)	Thaddeus Young (14)	Collison, Oladipo, Sabonis, Young (3)	Moda Center; 19,071	24–21
46	January 19	@ LA Lakers	L 86–99	Collison, Oladipo (25)	Domantas Sabonis (14)	Collison, Oladipo (4)	Staples Center; 18,997	24–22
47	January 21	@ San Antonio	W 94–86	Victor Oladipo (17)	Lance Stephenson (8)	Collison, Young (4)	AT&T Center; 18,418	25–22
48	January 24	Phoenix	W 116–101	Thaddeus Young (22)	Lance Stephenson (9)	Victor Oladipo (9)	Bankers Life Fieldhouse; 14,060	26–22
49	January 26	@ Cleveland	L 108–115	Victor Oladipo (25)	Domantas Sabonis (11)	Collison, Oladipo (7)	Quicken Loans Arena; 20,562	26–23
50	January 27	Orlando	W 114–112	Victor Oladipo (24)	Domantas Sabonis (9)	Darren Collison (7)	Bankers Life Fieldhouse; 17,923	27–23
51	January 29	Charlotte	W 105–96	Victor Oladipo (25)	Domantas Sabonis (10)	Darren Collison (6)	Bankers Life Fieldhouse; 14,225	28–23
52	January 31	Memphis	W 105–101	Bojan Bogdanovic (21)	Myles Turner (11)	Oladipo, Young (5)	Bankers Life Fieldhouse; 15,093	29–23

February : 5–4 (home: 3–1; road: 2–3)

Game	Date	Team	Score	High points	High rebounds	High assists	Location Attendance	Record
53	February 2	@ Charlotte	L 126–133	Victor Oladipo (35)	Myles Turner (11)	Darren Collison (4)	Spectrum Center; 17,135	29–24
54	February 3	Philadelphia	W 100–92	Bogdanovic, Oladipo (19)	Victor Oladipo (9)	Domantas Sabonis (6)	Bankers Life Fieldhouse; 17,923	30–24
55	February 5	Washington	L 102–111	Bojan Bogdanovic (29)	Lance Stephenson (9)	Lance Stephenson (6)	Bankers Life Fieldhouse; 13,169	30–25
—	February 7	@ New Orleans	Postponed due to water leak in arena roof (March 21)				Smoothie King Center	
56	February 9	@ Boston	W 97–91	Victor Oladipo (35)	Thaddeus Young (14)	Cory Joseph (7)	TD Garden; 18,624	31–25
57	February 11	New York	W 121–113	Victor Oladipo (30)	Thaddeus Young (11)	Victor Oladipo (9)	Bankers Life Fieldhouse; 17,923	32–25
58	February 14	@ Brooklyn	W 108–103	Victor Oladipo (25)	Myles Turner (14)	Victor Oladipo (4)	Barclays Center; 13,159	33–25
59	February 23	Atlanta	W 116–93	Domantas Sabonis (21)	Domantas Sabonis (13)	Victor Oladipo (9)	Bankers Life Fieldhouse; 17,923	34–25
60	February 26	@ Dallas	L 103–109	Myles Turner (24)	Thaddeus Young (14)	Oladipo, Stephenson (4)	American Airlines Center; 19,536	34–26
61	February 28	@ Atlanta	L 102–107	Bojan Bogdanovic (26)	Domantas Sabonis (12)	Victor Oladipo (5)	Philips Arena; 13,316	34–27

March : 11–4 (home: 5–2; road: 6–2)

Game	Date	Team	Score	High points	High rebounds	High assists	Location Attendance	Record
62	March 2	@ Milwaukee	W 103–96	Victor Oladipo (21)	Myles Turner (9)	Victor Oladipo (6)	Bradley Center; 17,217	35–27
63	March 4	@ Washington	W 98–95	Victor Oladipo (33)	Myles Turner (13)	Oladipo, Turner (3)	Capital One Arena; 16,646	36–27
64	March 5	Milwaukee	W 92–89	Bojan Bogdanovic (29)	Thaddeus Young (7)	Victor Oladipo (5)	Bankers Life Fieldhouse; 15,874	37–27
65	March 7	Utah	L 84–104	Myles Turner (24)	Domantas Sabonis (9)	Victor Oladipo (7)	Bankers Life Fieldhouse; 16,432	37–28
66	March 9	Atlanta	W 112–87	Bojan Bogdanovic (21)	Myles Turner (12)	Collison, Oladipo (5)	Bankers Life Fieldhouse; 17,923	38–28
67	March 11	@ Boston	W 99–97	Victor Oladipo (27)	Myles Turner (10)	Darren Collison (10)	TD Garden; 18,624	39–28
68	March 13	@ Philadelphia	W 101–98	Myles Turner (25)	Thaddeus Young (10)	Cory Joseph (5)	Wells Fargo Center; 20,531	40–28
69	March 15	Toronto	L 99–106	Darren Collison (22)	Al Jefferson (12)	Collison, Joseph (4)	Bankers Life Fieldhouse; 17,923	40–29
70	March 17	@ Washington	L 102–109	Lance Stephenson (25)	Al Jefferson (9)	Darren Collison (6)	Capital One Arena; 18,249	40–30
71	March 19	LA Lakers	W 110–100	Myles Turner (21)	Thaddeus Young (9)	Darren Collison (8)	Bankers Life Fieldhouse; 16,603	41–30
72	March 21	@ New Orleans	L 92–96	Victor Oladipo (21)	Young, Turner (10)	Darren Collison (6)	Smoothie King Center; 14,148	41–31
73	March 23	LA Clippers	W 109–104	Bojan Bogdanovic (28)	Thaddeus Young (10)	Darren Collison (10)	Bankers Life Fieldhouse; 17,923	42–31
74	March 25	Miami	W 113–107 (OT)	Victor Oladipo (23)	Cory Joseph (10)	Cory Joseph (7)	Bankers Life Fieldhouse; 17,923	43–31
75	March 27	@ Golden State	W 92–81	Victor Oladipo (24)	Thaddeus Young (10)	Victor Oladipo (6)	Oracle Arena; 19,596	44–31
76	March 29	@ Sacramento	W 106–103	Bojan Bogdanovic (25)	Sabonis, Youug (10)	Darren Collison (9)	Golden 1 Center; 17,583	45–31

April : 3–3 (home: 1–1; road: 2–2)

Game	Date	Team	Score	High points	High rebounds	High assists	Location Attendance	Record
77	April 1	@ LA Clippers	W 111–104	Victor Oladipo (30)	Thaddeus Young (9)	Victor Oladipo (12)	Staples Center; 15,866	46–31
78	April 3	@ Denver	L 104–107	Victor Oladipo (25)	Thaddeus Young (10)	Victor Oladipo (7)	Pepsi Center; 14,743	46–32
79	April 5	Golden State	W 126–106	Bojan Bogdanovic (28)	Domantas Sabonis (9)	Victor Oladipo (7)	Bankers Life Fieldhouse; 17,923	47–32
80	April 6	@ Toronto	L 73–92	Glenn Robinson III (12)	Lance Stephenson (8)	Darren Collison (5)	Air Canada Centre; 19,924	47–33
81	April 8	@ Charlotte	W 123–117	Victor Oladipo (27)	Lance Stephenson (10)	Lance Stephenson (10)	Spectrum Center; 16,629	48–33
82	April 10	Charlotte	L 93–119	Collison, Leaf, Robinson III (13)	Lance Stephenson (13)	Cory Joseph (8)	Bankers Life Fieldhouse; 17,331	48–34

2017–18 season schedule

=== Playoffs ===
2018 playoff game log
Total: 3–4 (home: 2–1; road: 1–3)
First Round: 3–4 (home: 2–1; road: 1–3)

Game	Date	Team	Score	High points	High rebounds	High assists	Location Attendance	Series
1	April 15	@ Cleveland	W 98–80	Victor Oladipo (32)	Myles Turner (8)	Darren Collison (6)	Quicken Loans Arena; 20,562	1–0
2	April 18	@ Cleveland	L 97–100	Victor Oladipo (22)	Thaddeus Young (6)	Collison, Oladipo (6)	Quicken Loans Arena; 20,562	1–1
3	April 20	Cleveland	W 92–90	Bojan Bogdanovic (30)	Myles Turner (10)	Victor Oladipo (7)	Bankers Life Fieldhouse; 17,923	2–1
4	April 22	Cleveland	L 100–104	Domantas Sabonis (19)	Thaddeus Young (16)	Darren Collison (8)	Bankers Life Fieldhouse; 17,923	2–2
5	April 25	@ Cleveland	L 95–98	Domantas Sabonis (22)	Victor Oladipo (12)	Cory Joseph (6)	Quicken Loans Arena; 20,562	2–3
6	April 27	Cleveland	W 121–87	Victor Oladipo (28)	Victor Oladipo (13)	Victor Oladipo (10)	Bankers Life Fieldhouse; 17,923	3–3
7	April 29	@ Cleveland	L 101–105	Victor Oladipo (30)	Victor Oladipo (12)	Victor Oladipo (6)	Quicken Loans Arena; 20,562	3–4

2018 playoff schedule

== Player statistics ==
=== Regular season ===
Player	POS	GP	GS	MP	REB	AST	STL	BLK	PTS	MPG	RPG	APG	SPG	BPG	PPG
Cory Joseph	PG	82	17	2,210	263	260	80	18	649	27.0	3.2	3.2	1.0	.2	7.9
Lance Stephenson	SG	82	7	1,850	424	235	46	17	757	22.6	5.2	2.9	.6	.2	9.2
Thaddeus Young	PF	81	81	2,607	512	152	135	36	955	32.2	6.3	1.9	1.7	.4	11.8
Bojan Bogdanović	SF	80	80	2,464	270	119	55	8	1,141	30.8	3.4	1.5	.7	.1	14.3
Victor Oladipo	SG	75	75	2,552	390	323	177	57	1,735	34.0	5.2	4.3	2.4	.8	23.1
Domantas Sabonis	C	74	19	1,810	572	151	40	32	861	24.5	7.7	2.0	.5	.4	11.6
Darren Collison	PG	69	64	2,018	178	368	92	15	855	29.2	2.6	5.3	1.3	.2	12.4
Myles Turner	C	65	62	1,836	417	87	38	118	828	28.2	6.4	1.3	.6	1.8	12.7
Joe Young	PG	53	1	558	63	39	14	1	207	10.5	1.2	.7	.3	.0	3.9
T. J. Leaf	PF	53	0	459	82	9	5	4	156	8.7	1.5	.2	.1	.1	2.9
Al Jefferson	C	36	1	484	143	30	16	23	252	13.4	4.0	.8	.4	.6	7.0
Alex Poythress	PF	25	0	104	17	2	3	1	26	4.2	.7	.1	.1	.0	1.0
Glenn Robinson III	SF	23	1	338	37	17	13	1	95	14.7	1.6	.7	.6	.0	4.1
Damien Wilkins	SF	19	1	152	16	9	2	1	33	8.0	.8	.5	.1	.1	1.7
Trevor Booker^{†}	PF	17	1	269	77	17	4	5	91	15.8	4.5	1.0	.2	.3	5.4
Ike Anigbogu	C	11	0	30	9	0	1	3	13	2.7	.8	.0	.1	.3	1.2
Ben Moore	PF	2	0	9	1	1	0	0	0	4.5	.5	.5	.0	.0	.0
Edmond Sumner	PG	1	0	2	1	0	0	0	2	2.0	1.0	.0	.0	.0	2.0
Trey McKinney-Jones	SG	1	0	1	0	0	0	0	0	1.0	.0	.0	.0	.0	.0

- ^{†} Denotes player spent time with another team in the season. Stats reflect time with the Pacers only.

=== Playoffs ===
Player	POS	GP	GS	MP	REB	AST	STL	BLK	PTS	MPG	RPG	APG	SPG	BPG	PPG
Victor Oladipo	SG	7	7	261	58	42	17	3	159	37.3	8.3	6.0	2.4	.4	22.7
Bojan Bogdanović	SF	7	7	238	24	13	6	0	87	34.0	3.4	1.9	.9	.0	12.4
Thaddeus Young	PF	7	7	237	54	10	12	6	79	33.9	7.7	1.4	1.7	.9	11.3
Darren Collison	PG	7	7	214	21	33	7	0	79	30.6	3.0	4.7	1.0	.0	11.3
Myles Turner	C	7	7	196	36	4	2	4	87	28.0	5.1	.6	.3	.6	12.4
Domantas Sabonis	C	7	0	166	32	5	1	2	87	23.7	4.6	.7	.1	.3	12.4
Lance Stephenson	SG	7	0	149	19	20	2	1	73	21.3	2.7	2.9	.3	.1	10.4
Cory Joseph	PG	7	0	143	17	21	9	2	33	20.4	2.4	3.0	1.3	.3	4.7
Trevor Booker	PF	7	0	64	18	0	1	1	18	9.1	2.6	.0	.1	.1	2.6
Glenn Robinson III	SF	2	0	6	1	0	0	0	2	3.0	.5	.0	.0	.0	1.0
T. J. Leaf	PF	1	0	4	0	0	0	0	0	4.0	.0	.0	.0	.0	.0
Joe Young	PG	1	0	3	0	0	0	0	0	3.0	.0	.0	.0	.0	.0

== Transactions ==
=== Trades ===
July 6, 2017	To Indiana Pacers Victor Oladipo; Domantas Sabonis	To Oklahoma City Thunder Paul George
July 14, 2017	To Indiana Pacers Cory Joseph	To Toronto Raptors Draft rights to Emir Preldžić; C.J. Miles

=== Free agents ===
==== Re-signed ====
Player	Signed

==== Additions ====
Player	Signed	Former Team
Darren Collison	2-year/$20M	Sacramento Kings
Bojan Bogdanovic	2-year/$21M	Washington Wizards
Alex Poythress	Two-way contract	Philadelphia 76ers
DeQuan Jones	Training camp deal	(France) Lille Métropole
Trey McKinney-Jones		Fort Wayne Mad Ants (G League)

==== Subtractions ====
Player	Reason	New Team
Monta Ellis	Waived	Retired
Rakeem Christmas	Waived	(Turkey) Galatasaray Odeabank
Kevin Séraphin	Waived	(Spain) FC Barcelona
