= 2017–18 Washington Wizards season =

NBA professional basketball team season

- Head coach: Scott Brooks
- General manager: Ernie Grunfeld
- Owners: Ted Leonsis
- Arena: Capital One Arena

Results
- Record: 43–39 (.524)
- Place: Division: 2nd (Southeast); Conference: 8th (Eastern)
- Playoff finish: First Round (lost to Raptors 2–4)
- Stats at Basketball Reference

Local media
- Television: NBC Sports Washington; NBC 4
- Radio: Federal News Radio; 106.7 The Fan

Semi Ojeleye of the Boston Celtics defends Wizards' John Wall during a 2018 game.

The 2017–18 Washington Wizards season was the 57th season of the franchise in the National Basketball Association (NBA) and 45th in the Washington, D.C. area. The Wizards played their home games at newly named Capital One Arena.

They finished the regular season with a record of 43–39, clinching the 8th seed. In the playoffs, the Wizards faced the top-seeded Toronto Raptors in the First Round, and lost in 6 games.

This would be the final season until 2021 that saw the Wizards qualify for the playoffs, and remains the last season when the Wizards achieved a winning record.

== Previous season ==
The Wizards finished the 2016–17 season 49–33 to finish in first place in the Southeast Division. They received the No. 4 seed in the Eastern Conference playoffs where they defeated the Atlanta Hawks in the first round of the playoffs, winning the series 4–2. In the Conference semifinals, they were defeated 4–3 by the Boston Celtics.

== Offseason ==
=== Draft picks ===
The Wizards did not select anyone in the draft, having traded both picks earlier in the year.

- The Wizards traded their first-round pick (No. 22 overall) to the Brooklyn Nets on February 22, along with Andrew Nicholson and Marcus Thornton, in exchange for both Bojan Bogdanović and Chris McCullough.
- The Wizards traded their second-round pick (No. 52 overall) to the New Orleans Pelicans on June 21 (the night before the NBA Draft), in exchange for Tim Frazier.

== Roster ==
2017–18 Washington Wizards roster
Players

Pos.	No.	Player	Height	Weight	DOB	From
SG	3	Bradley Beal	6 ft 3 in (1.91 m)	207 lb (94 kg)	1993-06-28	Florida
PG	8	Tim Frazier	6 ft 1 in (1.85 m)	170 lb (77 kg)	1990-11-01	Penn State
C	13	Marcin Gortat	6 ft 11 in (2.11 m)	240 lb (109 kg)	1984-02-17	Poland
PG	4	Ty Lawson	5 ft 11 in (1.80 m)	195 lb (88 kg)	1987-11-03	North Carolina
C	28	Ian Mahinmi	6 ft 11 in (2.11 m)	262 lb (119 kg)	1986-11-05	France
PF	1	Chris McCullough	6 ft 9 in (2.06 m)	215 lb (98 kg)	1995-02-05	Syracuse
SG	20	Jodie Meeks (S)	6 ft 4 in (1.93 m)	210 lb (95 kg)	1987-08-21	Kentucky
PF	5	Markieff Morris	6 ft 10 in (2.08 m)	245 lb (111 kg)	1989-09-02	Kansas
SF	12	Kelly Oubre	6 ft 7 in (2.01 m)	205 lb (93 kg)	1995-12-09	Kansas
SF	22	Otto Porter	6 ft 8 in (2.03 m)	198 lb (90 kg)	1993-06-03	Georgetown
SF	7	Devin Robinson (TW)	6 ft 8 in (2.03 m)	200 lb (91 kg)	1995-03-07	Florida
SG	31	Tomáš Satoranský	6 ft 7 in (2.01 m)	210 lb (95 kg)	1991-10-30	Czech Republic
PF	30	Mike Scott	6 ft 8 in (2.03 m)	237 lb (108 kg)	1988-07-16	Virginia
PG	9	Ramon Sessions	6 ft 3 in (1.91 m)	190 lb (86 kg)	1986-04-11	Nevada
C	14	Jason Smith	7 ft 0 in (2.13 m)	240 lb (109 kg)	1986-03-02	Colorado State
PG	2	John Wall	6 ft 3 in (1.91 m)	210 lb (95 kg)	1990-09-06	Kentucky

Coaches
Head coach
- Scott Brooks
Assistant(s)
- Tony Brown
- Chad Iske
- Sidney Lowe
- Mike Terpstra
- Maz Trakh
- Navin Hettiarachchi (strength and conditioning)
- Corey Bennett (trainer)

Legend
- (DP) Unsigned draft pick
- (FA) Free agent
- (S) Suspended
- (GL) On assignment to G League
- (TW) Two-way affiliate player
- Injured

Roster
Updated: April 11, 2018

== Standings ==
=== Division ===
Southeast Division	W	L	PCT	GB	Home	Road	Div	GP
y – Miami Heat	44	38	.537	–	26‍–‍15	18‍–‍23	11–5	82
x – Washington Wizards	43	39	.524	1.0	23‍–‍18	20‍–‍21	8–8	82
Charlotte Hornets	36	46	.439	8.0	21‍–‍20	15‍–‍26	11–5	82
Orlando Magic	25	57	.305	19.0	17‍–‍24	8‍–‍33	5–11	82
Atlanta Hawks	24	58	.293	20.0	16‍–‍25	8‍–‍33	5–11	82

=== Conference ===
Eastern Conference
#	Team	W	L	PCT	GB	GP
1	c – Toronto Raptors *	59	23	.720	–	82
2	x – Boston Celtics	55	27	.671	4.0	82
3	x – Philadelphia 76ers	52	30	.634	7.0	82
4	y – Cleveland Cavaliers *	50	32	.610	9.0	82
5	x – Indiana Pacers	48	34	.585	11.0	82
6	y – Miami Heat *	44	38	.537	15.0	82
7	x – Milwaukee Bucks	44	38	.537	15.0	82
8	x – Washington Wizards	43	39	.524	16.0	82
9	Detroit Pistons	39	43	.476	20.0	82
10	Charlotte Hornets	36	46	.439	23.0	82
11	New York Knicks	29	53	.354	30.0	82
12	Brooklyn Nets	28	54	.341	31.0	82
13	Chicago Bulls	27	55	.329	32.0	82
14	Orlando Magic	25	57	.305	34.0	82
15	Atlanta Hawks	24	58	.293	35.0	82

== Game log ==
=== Preseason ===
2017 pre-season game log
Total: 4–1 (home: 3–0; road: 1–1)
Pre-season: 4–1 (home: 3–0; road: 1–1)

Game	Date	Team	Score	High points	High rebounds	High assists	Location Attendance	Record
1	October 2	Guangzhou Long-Lions	W 126–96	Jodie Meeks (19)	Daniel Ochefu (7)	Donald Sloan (7)	Capital One Arena; N/A	1–0
2	October 6	New York	W 104–100	John Wall (19)	Jason Smith (8)	John Wall (6)	Capital One Arena; 11,899	2–0
3	October 8	Cleveland	W 102–94	Felix, Meeks (13)	Oubre Jr., Scott (5)	Tomas Satoransky (5)	Capital One Arena; 12,984	3–0
4	October 11	@ Miami	L 115–117	John Wall (16)	Kelly Oubre Jr. (14)	John Wall (8)	American Airlines Arena; 19,600	3–1
5	October 13	@ New York	W 110–103	Bradley Beal (24)	Kelly Oubre Jr. (8)	Tomas Satoransky (5)	Madison Square Garden; 16,461	4–1

2017–18 season schedule

=== Regular season ===
2017–18 game log
Total: 43–39 (home: 23–18; road: 20–21)
October: 4–2 (home: 2–0; road: 2–2)

Game	Date	Team	Score	High points	High rebounds	High assists	Location Attendance	Record
1	October 18	Philadelphia	W 120–115	John Wall (28)	Marcin Gortat (17)	John Wall (8)	Capital One Arena; 20,356	1–0
2	October 20	Detroit	W 115–111	John Wall (26)	Gortat, Porter Jr. (9)	John Wall (10)	Capital One Arena; 16,337	2–0
3	October 23	@ Denver	W 109–104	Bradley Beal (20)	Otto Porter Jr. (10)	John Wall (12)	Pepsi Center; 14,294	3–0
4	October 25	@ LA Lakers	L 99–102 (OT)	Bradley Beal (28)	Marcin Gortat (14)	John Wall (9)	Staples Center; 18,996	3–1
5	October 27	@ Golden State	L 117–120	Otto Porter (29)	Otto Porter (10)	John Wall (14)	Oracle Arena; 19,596	3–2
6	October 29	@ Sacramento	W 110–83	John Wall (19)	Marcin Gortat (9)	John Wall (9)	Golden 1 Center; 17,583	4–2

November : 7–8 (home: 3–5; road: 4–3)

Game	Date	Team	Score	High points	High rebounds	High assists	Location Attendance	Record
7	November 1	Phoenix	L 116–122	Bradley Beal (40)	Marcin Gortat (13)	John Wall (6)	Capital One Arena; 14,790	4–3
8	November 3	Cleveland	L 122–130	Bradley Beal (36)	Oubre Jr., Wall (6)	John Wall (15)	Capital One Arena; 20,356	4–4
9	November 5	@ Toronto	W 107–96	Bradley Beal (38)	Marcin Gortat (12)	Tim Frazier (8)	Air Canada Centre; 19,800	5–4
10	November 7	Dallas	L 99–113	Beal, Wall (23)	Kelly Oubre Jr. (7)	John Wall (14)	Capital One Arena; 14,505	5–5
11	November 9	LA Lakers	W 111–95	John Wall (23)	Kelly Oubre Jr. (11)	Beal, Frazier, Wall (5)	Capital One Arena; 20,173	6–5
12	November 11	Atlanta	W 113–94	Bradley Beal (19)	Oubre Jr., Gortat (7)	Frazier, Wall (5)	Capital One Arena; 17,260	7–5
13	November 13	Sacramento	W 110–92	John Wall (21)	Ian Mahinmi (9)	John Wall (9)	Capital One Arena; 14,660	8–5
14	November 15	@ Miami	W 102–93	John Wall (27)	Kelly Oubre Jr. (13)	John Wall (6)	AmericanAirlines Arena; 19,600	9–5
15	November 17	Miami	L 88–91	Bradley Beal (26)	Marcin Gortat (13)	John Wall (8)	Capital One Arena; 17,551	9–6
16	November 19	@ Toronto	L 91–100	Bradley Beal (27)	Marcin Gortat (12)	Tim Frazier (8)	Air Canada Centre; 19,800	9–7
17	November 20	@ Milwaukee	W 99–88	Bradley Beal (23)	Marcin Gortat (12)	John Wall (6)	BMO Harris Bradley Center; 16,122	10–7
18	November 22	@ Charlotte	L 124–129 (OT)	John Wall (31)	Marcin Gortat (11)	John Wall (11)	Spectrum Center; 16,041	10–8
19	November 25	Portland	L 105–108	Bradley Beal (26)	Otto Porter Jr. (10)	Bradley Beal (7)	Capital One Arena; 18,092	10–9
20	November 28	@ Minnesota	W 92–89	Otto Porter Jr. (22)	Porter Jr., Mahinmi (8)	Beal, Satoransky (6)	Target Center; 13,442	11–9
21	November 29	@ Philadelphia	L 113–118	Kelly Oubre Jr. (22)	Kelly Oubre Jr. (7)	Tomas Satoransky (8)	Wells Fargo Center; 20,492	11–10

December : 10–6 (home: 7–1; road: 3–5)

Game	Date	Team	Score	High points	High rebounds	High assists	Location Attendance	Record
22	December 1	Detroit	W 109–91	Markieff Morris (23)	Marcin Gortat (12)	Tim Frazier (6)	Capital One Arena; 17,885	12–10
23	December 4	@ Utah	L 69–116	Otto Porter Jr. (14)	Marcin Gortat (7)	Marcin Gortat (3)	Vivint Smart Home Arena; 17,227	12–11
24	December 5	@ Portland	W 106–92	Bradley Beal (51)	Otto Porter Jr. (10)	Marcin Gortat (7)	Moda Center; 19,241	13–11
25	December 7	@ Phoenix	W 109–99	Bradley Beal (34)	Gortat, Mahinmi (8)	Tomas Satoransky (5)	Talking Stick Resort Arena; 15,925	14–11
26	December 9	@ LA Clippers	L 112–113	Otto Porter Jr. (27)	Otto Porter Jr. (11)	Frazier, Satoransky (6)	Staples Center; 15,739	14–12
27	December 12	@ Brooklyn	L 98–103	Bradley Beal (28)	Gortat, Porter Jr. (11)	Bradley Beal (4)	Barclays Center; 14,515	14–13
28	December 13	Memphis	W 93–87	Bradley Beal (18)	Otto Porter Jr. (9)	Bradley Beal (7)	Capital One Arena; 15,297	15–13
29	December 15	LA Clippers	W 100–91	Bradley Beal (20)	Bradley Beal (11)	John Wall (5)	Capital One Arena; 15,442	16–13
30	December 17	Cleveland	L 99–106	Bradley Beal (27)	John Wall (10)	John Wall (6)	Capital One Arena; 20,356	16–14
31	December 19	New Orleans	W 116–106	Bradley Beal (26)	Marcin Gortat (14)	John Wall (10)	Capital One Arena; 16,529	17–14
32	December 22	@ Brooklyn	L 84–119	Kelly Oubre Jr. (13)	Jason Smith (6)	Beal, Frazier (5)	Barclays Center; 15,589	17–15
33	December 23	Orlando	W 130–103	Mike Scott (18)	Oubre Jr., Meeks (6)	John Wall (13)	Capital One Arena; 17,218	18–15
34	December 25	@ Boston	W 111–103	Bradley Beal (25)	Marcin Gortat (10)	John Wall (14)	TD Garden; 18,624	19–15
35	December 27	@ Atlanta	L 99–113	Bradley Beal (20)	Markieff Morris (8)	John Wall (11)	Philips Arena; 15,763	19–16
36	December 29	Houston	W 121–103	Beal, Oubre Jr. (21)	Markieff Morris (9)	Otto Porter Jr. (7)	Capital One Arena; 20,356	20–16
37	December 31	Chicago	W 114–110	Bradley Beal (39)	Markieff Morris (11)	Beal, Wall (9)	Capital One Arena; 20,356	21–16

January : 7–6 (home: 4–3; road: 3–3)

Game	Date	Team	Score	High points	High rebounds	High assists	Location Attendance	Record
38	January 3	New York	W 121–103	Bradley Beal (27)	Markieff Morris (11)	John Wall (9)	Capital One Arena; 17,206	22–16
39	January 5	@ Memphis	W 102–100	Bradley Beal (34)	Markieff Morris (17)	John Wall (9)	FedExForum; 16,988	23–16
40	January 6	Milwaukee	L 103–110	Bradley Beal (20)	Markieff Morris (10)	John Wall (16)	Capital One Arena; 18,762	23–17
41	January 10	Utah	L 104–107	John Wall (35)	Marcin Gortat (8)	John Wall (11)	Capital One Arena; 15,640	23–18
42	January 12	Orlando	W 125–119	Beal, Wall (30)	Marcin Gortat (11)	John Wall (9)	Capital One Arena; 18,171	24–18
43	January 13	Brooklyn	W 119–113 (OT)	Bradley Beal (24)	Marcin Gortat (13)	John Wall (16)	Capital One Arena; 18,354	25–18
44	January 15	Milwaukee	L 95–104	John Wall (27)	Marcin Gortat (7)	John Wall (9)	Capital One Arena; 19,607	25–19
45	January 17	@ Charlotte	L 109–133	Bradley Beal (26)	Marcin Gortat (8)	John Wall (9)	Spectrum Center; 11,528	25–20
46	January 19	@ Detroit	W 122–112	Bradley Beal (26)	Markieff Morris (9)	John Wall (11)	Little Caesars Arena; 14,744	26–20
47	January 22	@ Dallas	L 75–98	Bradley Beal (18)	Marcin Gortat (10)	John Wall (5)	American Airlines Center; 19,328	26–21
48	January 25	@ Oklahoma City	L 112–121	Bradley Beal (41)	Bradley Beal (12)	John Wall (12)	Chesapeake Energy Arena; 18,203	26–22
49	January 27	@ Atlanta	W 129–104	Markieff Morris (23)	Marcin Gortat (6)	Tim Frazier (14)	Philips Arena; 15,843	27–22
50	January 30	Oklahoma City	W 102–96	Otto Porter Jr. (25)	Marcin Gortat (7)	Bradley Beal (9)	Capital One Arena; 20,356	28–22

February : 8–4 (home: 2–3; road: 6–1)

Game	Date	Team	Score	High points	High rebounds	High assists	Location Attendance	Record
51	February 1	Toronto	W 122–119	Bradley Beal (27)	Otto Porter Jr. (11)	Beal, Porter Jr. (6)	Capital One Arena; 15,599	29–22
52	February 3	@ Orlando	W 115–98	Otto Porter Jr. (20)	Marcin Gortat (11)	Bradley Beal (8)	Amway Center; 18,846	30–22
53	February 5	@ Indiana	W 111–102	Bradley Beal (21)	Markieff Morris (10)	Frazier, Satoransky (6)	Bankers Life Fieldhouse; 13,169	31–22
54	February 6	@ Philadelphia	L 102–115	Bradley Beal (30)	Otto Porter Jr. (8)	Bradley Beal (5)	Wells Fargo Center; 20,530	31–23
55	February 8	Boston	L 104–110 (OT)	Otto Porter Jr. (27)	Otto Porter Jr. (11)	Bradley Beal (9)	Capital One Arena; 20,536	31–24
56	February 10	@ Chicago	W 101–90	Tomas Satoransky (25)	Gortat, Porter Jr. (9)	Beal, Satoransky (6)	United Center; 21,112	32–24
57	February 14	@ New York	W 118–113	Bradley Beal (36)	Ian Mahinmi (8)	Tomas Satoransky (11)	Madison Square Garden; 19,812	33–24
58	February 22	@ Cleveland	W 110–103	Bradley Beal (18)	Morris, Porter Jr. (8)	Bradley Beal (9)	Quicken Loans Arena; 20,562	34–24
59	February 23	Charlotte	L 105–122	Bradley Beal (33)	Marcin Gortat (8)	Markieff Morris (8)	Capital One Arena; 17,824	34–25
60	February 25	Philadelphia	W 109–94	Bradley Beal (24)	Marcin Gortat (10)	Tomas Satoransky (10)	Capital One Arena; 17,180	35–25
61	February 27	@ Milwaukee	W 107–104	Bradley Beal (21)	Beal, Gortat, Porter Jr. (7)	Bradley Beal (8)	Bradley Center; 16,093	36–25
62	February 28	Golden State	L 101–109	Otto Porter Jr. (29)	Otto Porter Jr. (10)	Bradley Beal (5)	Capital One Arena; 20,356	36–26

March : 6–8 (home: 4–5; road: 2–3)

Game	Date	Team	Score	High points	High rebounds	High assists	Location Attendance	Record
63	March 2	Toronto	L 95–102	Otto Porter Jr. (24)	Marcin Gortat (8)	Tomas Satoransky (8)	Capital One Arena; 18,631	36–27
64	March 4	Indiana	L 95–98	Bradley Beal (22)	Ian Mahinmi (9)	Bradley Beal (11)	Capital One Arena; 16,646	36–28
65	March 6	Miami	W 117–113 (OT)	Bradley Beal (30)	Markieff Morris (13)	Beal, Satoransky (7)	Capital One Arena; 16,582	37–28
66	March 9	@ New Orleans	W 116–97	Otto Porter Jr. (19)	Marcin Gortat (8)	Bradley Beal (9)	Smoothie King Center; 18,143	38–28
67	March 10	@ Miami	L 102–129	Jodie Meeks (23)	Kelly Oubre Jr. (6)	Tim Frazier (6)	American Airlines Arena; 19,600	38–29
68	March 13	Minnesota	L 111–116	Bradley Beal (19)	Ian Mahinmi (9)	Tomas Satoransky (7)	Capital One Arena; 17,078	38–30
69	March 14	@ Boston	W 125–124 (2OT)	Bradley Beal (34)	Mahinmi, Porter Jr. (11)	Bradley Beal (9)	TD Garden; 18,624	39–30
70	March 17	Indiana	W 109–102	Bradley Beal (19)	Marcin Gortat (8)	Tomas Satoransky (8)	Capital One Arena; 18,249	40–30
71	March 21	@ San Antonio	L 90–98	Bradley Beal (21)	Otto Porter Jr. (7)	Tomas Satoransky (6)	AT&T Center; 18,418	40–31
72	March 23	Denver	L 100–108	Bradley Beal (24)	Markieff Morris (8)	Tomas Satoransky (6)	Capital One Arena; 19,016	40–32
73	March 25	NY Knicks	L 97–101	Bradley Beal (14)	Otto Porter Jr. (10)	Tomas Satoransky (10)	Capital One Arena; 18,884	40–33
74	March 27	San Antonio	W 116–106	Markieff Morris (15)	Kelly Oubre Jr. (9)	Beal, Sessions (6)	Capital One Arena; 19,588	41–33
75	March 29	@ Detroit	L 92–103	Bradley Beal (15)	Marcin Gortat (12)	Tomas Satoransky (6)	Little Caesars Arena; 18,268	41–34
76	March 31	Charlotte	W 107–93	Otto Porter Jr. (26)	Otto Porter Jr. (11)	John Wall (14)	Capital One Arena; 19,071	42–34

April : 1–5 (home: 1–1; road: 0–4)

Game	Date	Team	Score	High points	High rebounds	High assists	Location Attendance	Record
77	April 1	@ Chicago	L 94–113	Otto Porter Jr. (17)	Marcin Gortat (7)	Bradley Beal (6)	United Center; 20,466	42–35
78	April 3	@ Houston	L 104–120	Bradley Beal (27)	Markieff Morris (6)	John Wall (9)	Toyota Center; 18,055	42–36
79	April 5	@ Cleveland	L 115–119	John Wall (28)	Bradley Beal (9)	John Wall (14)	Quicken Loans Arena; 20,562	42–37
80	April 6	Atlanta	L 97–103	Bradley Beal (32)	Marcin Gortat (11)	Marcin Gortat (4)	Capital One Arena; 19,557	42–38
81	April 10	Boston	W 113–101	John Wall (29)	Scott, Mahinmi (8)	John Wall (11)	Capital One Arena; 18,887	43–38
82	April 11	@ Orlando	L 92–101	Jodie Meeks (18)	Marcin Gortat (10)	Beal, Satoranský (4)	Amway Center; 17,598	43–39

2017–18 season schedule

=== Playoffs ===
2018 playoff game log
Total: 2–4 (home: 2–1; road: 0–3)
First Round: 2–4 (home: 2–1; road: 0–3)

Game	Date	Team	Score	High points	High rebounds	High assists	Location Attendance	Series
1	April 14	@ Toronto	L 106–114	John Wall (21)	Markieff Morris (11)	John Wall (15)	Air Canada Centre; 19,937	0–1
2	April 17	@ Toronto	L 119–130	John Wall (29)	Kelly Oubre Jr. (5)	John Wall (9)	Air Canada Centre; 20,242	0–2
3	April 20	Toronto	W 122–103	Wall, Beal (28)	Otto Porter Jr. (8)	John Wall (14)	Capital One Arena; 20,356	1–2
4	April 22	Toronto	W 106–98	Bradley Beal (31)	Gortat, Porter Jr., Wall (6)	John Wall (14)	Capital One Arena; 20,356	2–2
5	April 25	@ Toronto	L 98–108	John Wall (26)	Marcin Gortat (12)	John Wall (9)	Air Canada Centre; 19,987	2–3
6	April 27	Toronto	L 92–102	Bradley Beal (32)	Markieff Morris (15)	John Wall (8)	Capital One Arena; 20,356	2–4

2018 playoff schedule

== Player statistics ==
Legend
GP	Games played	GS	Games started	MPG	Minutes per game
FG%	Field-goal percentage	3P%	3-point field-goal percentage	FT%	Free-throw percentage
RPG	Rebounds per game	APG	Assists per game	SPG	Steals per game
BPG	Blocks per game	PPG	Points per game

=== Regular season ===
Washington Wizards statistics
Player	GP	GS	MPG	FG%	3P%	FT%	RPG	APG	SPG	BPG	PPG
Bradley Beal	82	82	36.3	.460	.375	.791	4.4	4.5	1.2	.4	22.6
Marcin Gortat	82	82	25.3	.518		.675	7.6	1.8	.5	.7	8.4
Kelly Oubre Jr.	81	11	27.5	.403	.341	.820	4.5	1.2	1.0	.4	11.8
Otto Porter Jr.	77	77	31.6	.503	.441	.828	6.4	2.0	1.5	.5	14.7
Ian Mahinmi	77	0	14.9	.556	.000	.703	4.1	.7	.5	.5	4.8
Jodie Meeks	77	0	14.5	.399	.343	.863	1.6	.9	.4	.1	6.3
Mike Scott	76	1	18.5	.527	.405	.658	3.3	1.1	.3	.1	8.8
Markieff Morris	73	73	27.0	.480	.367	.820	5.6	1.9	.8	.5	11.5
Tomáš Satoranský	73	30	22.5	.523	.465	.781	3.2	3.9	.7	.2	7.2
Tim Frazier	59	11	14.2	.395	.304	.767	1.9	3.3	.8	.1	3.0
John Wall	41	41	34.4	.420	.371	.726	3.7	9.6	1.4	1.1	19.4
Jason Smith	33	2	8.6	.391	.125	.905	1.6	.4	.1	.4	3.4
Chris McCullough	19	0	4.7	.429	.125	.643	1.3	.2	.0	.3	2.4
Ramon Sessions^{†}	15	0	15.0	.391	.400	.762	1.3	3.3	.5	.1	5.9
Devin Robinson	1	0	13.0	.333			5.0	.0	1.0	.0	2.0

=== Playoffs ===
Washington Wizards statistics
Player	GP	GS	MPG	FG%	3P%	FT%	RPG	APG	SPG	BPG	PPG
John Wall	6	6	39.0	.441	.190	.851	5.7	11.5	2.3	1.3	26.0
Bradley Beal	6	6	36.0	.454	.467	.870	3.3	2.8	1.2	.3	23.2
Markieff Morris	6	6	30.2	.490	.167	.900	7.5	1.7	.7	.8	9.8
Marcin Gortat	6	6	26.7	.558		.571	6.3	1.0	.0	.3	8.7
Kelly Oubre Jr.	6	1	24.7	.375	.211	.889	3.8	.7	1.0	.5	9.3
Mike Scott	6	0	21.0	.634	.636	1.000	3.5	.7	.3	.2	10.8
Tomáš Satoranský	6	0	10.0	.154	.000	.750	1.5	.5	.0	.0	1.2
Ian Mahinmi	6	0	8.7	.714		.909	1.8	.2	.7	.8	5.0
Otto Porter Jr.	5	5	31.6	.488	.417	.625	5.0	1.6	1.2	1.0	10.0
Ty Lawson	5	0	19.2	.346	.625	1.000	2.6	3.0	.6	.0	5.8
Tim Frazier	2	0	3.0	.000			.5	1.5	.5	.0	.0
Jason Smith	1	0	2.0				.0	.0	.0	.0	.0

- ^{†} Denotes player spent time with another team in the season. Stats reflect time with the Wizards only.

== Transactions ==
=== Trades ===
June 21, 2017	To Washington Wizards Tim Frazier	To New Orleans Pelicans Second-round pick in the 2017 NBA draft

=== Free agents ===
==== Re-signed ====
Player	Date Signed	Contract	Ref.
Otto Porter	July 8, 2017	4 years, $106.5 Million	
John Wall	July 21, 2017	4 years, $170 Million (DVPE)	

==== Additions ====
Player	Date Signed	Contract	Former Team	Ref.
Michael Young	July 5, 2017	2 years (Note: Exact salary is unknown, but at least $50,000 was ultimately guaranteed for each season as part of the two-way contract.)	Pittsburgh Panthers (Note: Player signed as an Undrafted Free Agent (UDFA) out of college on a two-way contract)	
Mike Scott	July 9, 2017	1 year, $1,709,538	Phoenix Suns / Atlanta Hawks (Note: Scott played with the Hawks through 2017, was officially traded to the Suns on February 23 but waived later that same day.)	
Jodie Meeks	July 12, 2017	2 years, $6,744,500	Orlando Magic	
Devin Robinson	July 14, 2017	2 years	Florida Gators	
Carrick Felix	October 14, 2017	1 year, $1,312,611	Utah Jazz	
Ramon Sessions	March 16, 2018 (Note: Sessions signed two 10-Day Contracts with the Wizards on February 23 and March 5, and was given a full contract on March 16.)	1 year, $355,218	New York Knicks	
Ty Lawson	April 12, 2018	1 year, $11,901	(China) Shandong Golden Stars	

==== Subtractions ====
Player	Reason Left	Date Left	New Team	Ref.
Trey Burke	RFA, no offer	June 26, 2017	New York Knicks	
Bojan Bogdanović	RFA, unmatched offer	July 10, 2017	Indiana Pacers	
Brandon Jennings	UFA	July 28, 2017	(China) Shanxi Brave Dragons	
Carrick Felix	Waived	November 2, 2017	(Australia) Melbourne United	
Michael Young	Waived	January 3, 2018	Northern Arizona Suns	
