= 2017–18 New York Knicks season =

Season of National Basketball Association team the New York Knicks

- Head coach: Jeff Hornacek
- President: Steve Mills
- General manager: Scott Perry
- Owners: The Madison Square Garden Company
- Arena: Madison Square Garden

Results
- Record: 29–53 (.354)
- Place: Division: 4th (Atlantic); Conference: 11th (Eastern)
- Playoff finish: Did not qualify
- Stats at Basketball Reference

Local media
- Television: MSG TV
- Radio: WEPN-FM

The 2017–18 New York Knicks season was the 72nd season of the franchise in the National Basketball Association (NBA).

On June 28, 2017, the Knicks' president of basketball operations Phil Jackson has mutually agreed to leave the team. On July 14, 2017, the Knicks named Scott Perry to become the team's general manager after promoting Steve Mills to become the team's president of basketball operations. However, the Knicks would have to give up a 2019 second-round pick and cash considerations to acquire him.

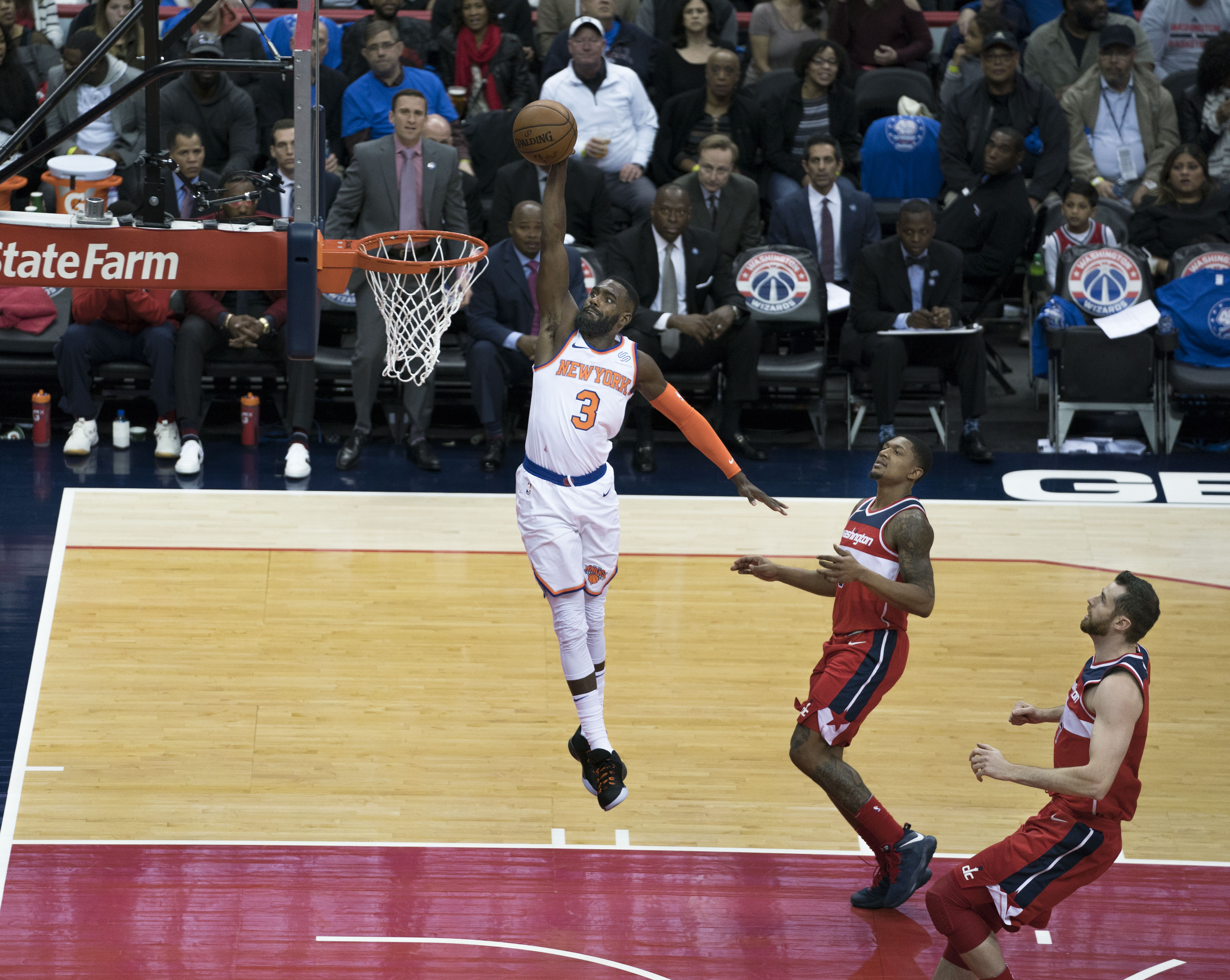
Tim Hardaway Jr. was the team's biggest signing for the season.

For the first time since 2011, Carmelo Anthony was not on the roster, as he was traded to the Oklahoma City Thunder in the offseason, before training camp began, in exchange for Enes Kanter, Doug McDermott, and a 2018 second-round draft pick.

On February 6, 2018 Kristaps Porzingis suffered a torn ACL, ending his season for the Knicks.

On April 12, 2018, the Knicks fired Jeff Hornacek and Kurt Rambis.

== Draft ==
Round	Pick	Player	Position	Nationality	College / Club
1	8	Frank Ntilikina	PG	France	(France) SIG Strasbourg
2	44	Damyean Dotson	SG	United States	Houston
2	58	Ognjen Jaramaz	PG	Serbia	(Serbia) Mega Leks

As one of the last things former team president Phil Jackson would do for the Knicks, he looked to oversee the prospects the team had for the New York Knicks. One of the more dramatic points of the team's draft prowess came nights before the draft began, where Jackson said he was looking to offer star player Kristaps Porziņģis (who was feeling very discouraged about the direction the team was taking around this time) to either the Phoenix Suns or Boston Celtics in exchange for the opportunity to also draft coveted small forward Josh Jackson. Rumors of Jackson also trying to obtain point guard Lonzo Ball from the Los Angeles Lakers would also crop up months after the draft concluded. However, after the Knicks ultimately failed to gain another draft pick to join their own first round selection, they would stick around with Kristaps and the three selections they still had back when their previous season concluded. For their only first-round pick, the Knicks would select the French/Belgian point guard Frank Ntilikina, who last played for the SIG Strasbourg in France's LNB Pro A. As for their two-second-round draft picks (the first being acquired from Chicago and the second from Houston), New York would use them on senior shooting guard Damyean Dotson from the University of Houston and Serbian point guard Ognjen Jaramaz from the Mega Leks. After the failed attempt to trade their star center, Jackson would ultimately be terminated from his position on June 28, 2017.

== Roster ==
2017–18 New York Knicks roster
Players

Pos.	No.	Player	Height	Weight	DOB	From
G	31	Ron Baker	6 ft 4 in (1.93 m)	220 lb (100 kg)	1993–03–30	Wichita State
F	8	Michael Beasley	6 ft 9 in (2.06 m)	235 lb (107 kg)	1989–01–09	Kansas State
G	23	Trey Burke	6 ft 1 in (1.85 m)	191 lb (87 kg)	1992–11–12	Michigan
G	21	Damyean Dotson	6 ft 5 in (1.96 m)	210 lb (95 kg)	1994–05–06	Houston
G/F	3	Tim Hardaway	6 ft 6 in (1.98 m)	205 lb (93 kg)	1992–03–16	Michigan
F	4	Isaiah Hicks (TW)	6 ft 9 in (2.06 m)	242 lb (110 kg)	1994–07–24	North Carolina
G	55	Jarrett Jack	6 ft 3 in (1.91 m)	200 lb (91 kg)	1983–10–28	Georgia Tech
C	00	Enes Kanter	6 ft 11 in (2.11 m)	245 lb (111 kg)	1992–05–20	Turkey
C	2	Luke Kornet (TW)	7 ft 1 in (2.16 m)	250 lb (113 kg)	1995–07–15	Vanderbilt
G	5	Courtney Lee	6 ft 5 in (1.96 m)	200 lb (91 kg)	1985–10–03	Western Kentucky
G	1	Emmanuel Mudiay	6 ft 5 in (1.96 m)	200 lb (91 kg)	1996–03–05	Prime Prep Academy (TX)
C	13	Joakim Noah	6 ft 11 in (2.11 m)	230 lb (104 kg)	1985–02–25	Florida
G	11	Frank Ntilikina	6 ft 5 in (1.96 m)	190 lb (86 kg)	1998–07–28	France
F/C	9	Kyle O'Quinn	6 ft 10 in (2.08 m)	250 lb (113 kg)	1990–03–26	Norfolk State
F/C	6	Kristaps Porziņģis	7 ft 3 in (2.21 m)	240 lb (109 kg)	1995–08–02	Latvia
F	42	Lance Thomas	6 ft 8 in (2.03 m)	235 lb (107 kg)	1988–04–24	Duke
F	0	Troy Williams	6 ft 7 in (2.01 m)	220 lb (100 kg)	1994–12–30	Indiana

Coaches
Head coach
- Jeff Hornacek
Assistant(s)
- Kurt Rambis (associate HC)
- Howard Eisley
- Corey Gaines
- Jerry Sichting

Legend
- (DP) Unsigned draft pick
- (FA) Free agent
- (S) Suspended
- (GL) On assignment to G League affiliate
- (TW) Two-way affiliate player
- Injured

Roster
Updated: 2018–04–12

== Standings ==
=== Division ===
Atlantic Division	W	L	PCT	GB	Home	Road	Div	GP
c – Toronto Raptors	59	23	.720	–	34‍–‍7	25‍–‍16	12–4	82
x – Boston Celtics	55	27	.671	4.0	27‍–‍14	28‍–‍13	12–4	82
x – Philadelphia 76ers	52	30	.634	7.0	30‍–‍11	22‍–‍19	9–7	82
New York Knicks	29	53	.354	30.0	19‍–‍22	10‍–‍31	6–10	82
Brooklyn Nets	28	54	.341	31.0	15‍–‍26	13‍–‍28	1–15	82

=== Conference ===
Eastern Conference
#	Team	W	L	PCT	GB	GP
1	c – Toronto Raptors *	59	23	.720	–	82
2	x – Boston Celtics	55	27	.671	4.0	82
3	x – Philadelphia 76ers	52	30	.634	7.0	82
4	y – Cleveland Cavaliers *	50	32	.610	9.0	82
5	x – Indiana Pacers	48	34	.585	11.0	82
6	y – Miami Heat *	44	38	.537	15.0	82
7	x – Milwaukee Bucks	44	38	.537	15.0	82
8	x – Washington Wizards	43	39	.524	16.0	82
9	Detroit Pistons	39	43	.476	20.0	82
10	Charlotte Hornets	36	46	.439	23.0	82
11	New York Knicks	29	53	.354	30.0	82
12	Brooklyn Nets	28	54	.341	31.0	82
13	Chicago Bulls	27	55	.329	32.0	82
14	Orlando Magic	25	57	.305	34.0	82
15	Atlanta Hawks	24	58	.293	35.0	82

== Game log ==
=== Preseason ===
2017 pre-season game log
Total: 0–5 (Home: 0–2; Road: 0–3)
Pre-season: 0–5 (home: 0–2; road: 0–3)

Game	Date	Team	Score	High points	High rebounds	High assists	Location Attendance	Record
1	October 3	Brooklyn	L 107–115	Hardaway Jr., Kanter (17)	Beasley, Hernangomez (10)	Ramon Sessions (5)	Madison Square Garden; 14,981	0–1
2	October 6	@ Washington	L 100–104	Enes Kanter (16)	Michael Beasley (8)	Jack, Sessions (5)	Capital One Arena; 11,899	0–2
3	October 8	@ Brooklyn	L 83–117	Willy Hernangomez (17)	Willy Hernangomez (12)	Jarrett Jack (5)	Barclays Center; 14,161	0–3
4	October 9	Houston	L 95–117	Tim Hardaway Jr. (21)	Enes Kanter (8)	Baker, Quinn (4)	Madison Square Garden; N/A	0–4
5	October 13	Washington	L 103–110	Tim Hardaway Jr. (23)	Enes Kanter, Kyle O'Quinn (7)	Ron Baker (5)	Madison Square Garden; 17,461	0–5

2017–18 season schedule

=== Regular season ===
2017–18 game log
Total: 29–53 (Home: 19–22; Road: 10–31)
October: 3–3 (home: 2–1; road: 1–2)

Game	Date	Team	Score	High points	High rebounds	High assists	Location Attendance	Record
1	October 19	@ Oklahoma	L 84–105	Kristaps Porzingis (31)	Kristaps Porzingis (12)	Baker, McDermott (4)	Chesapeake Energy Arena; 18,203	0–1
2	October 21	Detroit	L 107–111	Kristaps Porzingis (33)	Enes Kanter (10)	Baker, Sessions (5)	Madison Square Garden; 19,812	0–2
3	October 24	@ Boston	L 89–110	Enes Kanter (16)	Enes Kanter (19)	Ramon Sessions (7)	TD Garden; 18,624	0–3
4	October 27	Brooklyn	W 107–86	Kristaps Porzingis (30)	Kristaps Porzingis (9)	Jack, Ntilikina (5)	Madison Square Garden; 19,812	1–3
5	October 29	@ Cleveland	W 114–95	Tim Hardaway Jr. (34)	Kanter, Porzingis (12)	Jarrett Jack (9)	Quicken Loans Arena; 20,562	2–3
6	October 30	Denver	W 116–110	Kristaps Porzingis (38)	Enes Kanter (9)	Jarrett Jack (10)	Madison Square Garden; 19,812	3–3

November : 8–7 (home: 8–3; road: 0–4)

Game	Date	Team	Score	High points	High rebounds	High assists	Location Attendance	Record
7	November 1	Houston	L 97–119	Tim Hardaway Jr. (23)	Hardaway Jr., Thomas (7)	Frank Ntilikina (8)	Madison Square Garden; 18,320	3–4
8	November 3	Phoenix	W 120–107	Kristaps Porzingis (37)	Enes Kanter (15)	Jarrett Jack (8)	Madison Square Garden; 19,404	4–4
9	November 5	Indiana	W 108–101	Kristaps Porzingis (40)	Enes Kanter (18)	Frank Ntilikina (7)	Madison Square Garden; 17,889	5–4
10	November 7	Charlotte	W 118–113	Kristaps Porzingis (28)	Enes Kanter(6)	Courtney Lee (9)	Madison Square Garden; 18,704	6–4
11	November 8	@ Orlando	L 99–112	Tim Hardaway Jr. (26)	Tim Hardaway Jr. (11)	Frank Ntilikina (9)	Amway Center; 18,500	6–5
12	November 11	Sacramento	W 118–91	Kristaps Porzingis (34)	Enes Kanter (13)	Jarrett Jack (6)	Madison Square Garden; 19,812	7–5
13	November 13	Cleveland	L 101–104	Tim Hardaway Jr. (28)	Enes Kanter (16)	Hardaway Jr., Jack (5)	Madison Square Garden; 19,812	7–6
14	November 15	Utah	W 106–101	Tim Hardaway Jr. (26)	Kristaps Porzingis (8)	Jarrett Jack (5)	Madison Square Garden; 18,695	8–6
15	November 17	@ Toronto	L 84–107	Hardaway Jr., Porzingis (13)	Michael Beasley (7)	Jarrett Jack (7)	Air Canada Centre; 19,800	8–7
16	November 20	L.A. Clippers	W 107–85	Kristaps Porzingis (25)	Enes Kanter (16)	Jarrett Jack (7)	Madison Square Garden; 18,848	9–7
17	November 22	Toronto	W 108–100	Tim Hardaway Jr. (38)	Kristaps Porzingis (12)	Courtney Lee (7)	Madison Square Garden; 19,812	10–7
18	November 24	@ Atlanta	L 104–116	Kristaps Porzingis (28)	Willy Hernangomez (7)	Jarrett Jack (14)	Philips Arena; 14,355	10–8
19	November 25	@ Houston	L 102–117	Michael Beasley (30)	Kyle O'Quinn (15)	Jarrett Jack (8)	Toyota Center; 18,055	10–9
20	November 27	Portland	L 91–103	Kristaps Porzingis (22)	Kyle O'Quinn (11)	Jack, Quinn (3)	Madison Square Garden; 18,409	10–10
21	November 29	Miami	W 115–86	Enes Kanter (22)	Enes Kanter (14)	Jarrett Jack (7)	Madison Square Garden; 17,693	11–10

December : 7–8 (home: 5–2; road: 2–6)

Game	Date	Team	Score	High points	High rebounds	High assists	Location Attendance	Record
22	December 3	Orlando	L 100–105	Michael Beasley (21)	Enes Kanter (16)	Jarrett Jack (7)	Madison Square Garden; 19,082	11–11
23	December 4	@ Indiana	L 97–115	Willy Hernangomez (14)	Willy Hernangomez (10)	Jarrett Jack (5)	Bankers Life Fieldhouse; 12,018	11–12
24	December 6	Memphis	W 99–88	Courtney Lee (24)	Enes Kanter (12)	Jarrett Jack (10)	Madison Square Garden; 19,812	12–12
25	December 9	@ Chicago	L 102–104	Kristaps Porzingis (22)	Enes Kanter (11)	Frank Ntilikina (7)	United Center; 20,149	12–13
26	December 10	Atlanta	W 111–107	Kristaps Porzingis (30)	Kristaps Porzingis (8)	Baker, Jack, O'Quinn (4)	Madison Square Garden; 19,189	13–13
27	December 12	LA Lakers	W 113–109 (OT)	Kristaps Porzingis (37)	Kanter, Porzingis (11)	Jarrett Jack (10)	Madison Square Garden; 19,359	14–13
28	December 14	@ Brooklyn	W 111–104	Courtney Lee (27)	Enes Kanter (9)	Frank Ntilikina (8)	Barclays Center; 17,732	15–13
29	December 16	Oklahoma City	W 111–96	Michael Beasley (30)	Jarrett Jack (8)	Jarrett Jack (7)	Madison Square Garden; 19,812	16–13
30	December 18	@ Charlotte	L 91–109	Michael Beasley (23)	Michael Beasley (9)	Jarrett Jack (7)	Spectrum Center; 15,386	16–14
31	December 21	Boston	W 102–93	Michael Beasley (32)	Michael Beasley (12)	Courtney Lee (3)	Madison Square Garden; 19,812	17–14
32	December 22	@ Detroit	L 101–104	Kristaps Porzingis (29)	Enes Kanter (16)	Jarrett Jack (6)	Little Caesars Arena; 16,922	17–15
33	December 25	Philadelphia	L 98–105	Enes Kanter (31)	Enes Kanter (22)	Jarrett Jack (7)	Madison Square Garden; 19,812	17–16
34	December 27	@ Chicago	L 87–92	Kristaps Porzingis (23)	Enes Kanter (11)	Jarrett Jack (8)	United Center; 21,883	17–17
35	December 28	@ San Antonio	L 107–119	Michael Beasley (23)	Michael Beasley (12)	Frank Ntilikina (11)	AT&T Center; 18,935	17–18
36	December 30	@ New Orleans	W 105–103	Kristaps Porzingis (30)	Enes Kanter (9)	Jarrett Jack (7)	Smoothie King Center; 16,947	18–18

January : 5–11 (home: 1–3; road: 4–8)

Game	Date	Team	Score	High points	High rebounds	High assists	Location Attendance	Record
37	January 2	San Antonio	L 91–100	Michael Beasley (18)	Beasley, Porzingis (9)	Lee, Jack (5)	Madison Square Garden; 19,812	18–19
38	January 3	@ Washington	L 103–121	Michael Beasley (20)	Kyle O'Quinn (10)	Jarrett Jack (4)	Capital One Arena; 17,206	18–20
39	January 5	@ Miami	L 103–107 (OT)	Courtney Lee (24)	Michael Beasley (10)	Jarrett Jack (5)	American Airlines Arena; 19,600	18–21
40	January 7	@ Dallas	W 100–96	Kristaps Porzingis (29)	Enes Kanter (18)	Jarrett Jack (8)	American Airlines Center; 20,171	19–21
41	January 10	Chicago	L 119–122 (2OT)	Michael Beasley (26)	Michael Beasley (12)	Jarrett Jack (10)	Madison Square Garden; 19,812	19–22
42	January 12	@ Minnesota	L 108–118	Jarrett Jack (18)	Enes Kanter (12)	Jarrett Jack (8)	Target Center; 18,978	19–23
43	January 14	New Orleans	L 118–123 (OT)	Hardaway Jr., Porzingis (25)	Enes Kanter (10)	Jarrett Jack (8)	Madison Square Garden; 19,812	19–24
44	January 15	@ Brooklyn	W 119–104	Kristaps Porzingis (26)	Michael Beasley (10)	Frank Ntilikina (10)	Barclays Center; 17,732	20–24
45	January 17	@ Memphis	L 99–105	Kristaps Porzingis (21)	Kanter, Porzingis (9)	Jarrett Jack (8)	FedExForum; 12,885	20–25
46	January 19	@ Utah	W 117–115	Tim Hardaway Jr. (31)	Enes Kanter (9)	Jarrett Jack (6)	Vivint Smart Home Arena; 18,306	21–25
47	January 21	@ LA Lakers	L 107–127	Beasley, Hardaway Jr., Porzingis (17)	Enes Kanter (14)	Jarrett Jack (10)	Staples Center; 18,997	21–26
48	January 23	@ Golden State	L 112–123	Michael Beasley (21)	Enes Kanter (9)	Jarrett Jack (6)	Oracle Arena; 19,596	21–27
49	January 25	@ Denver	L 118–130	Beasley, Porzingis (21)	Kanter, Porzingis (7)	Trey Burke (11)	Pepsi Center; 15,482	21–28
50	January 26	@ Phoenix	W 107–85	Enes Kanter (20)	Enes Kanter (10)	Jack, Lee (5)	Talking Stick Resort Arena; 17,068	22–28
51	January 30	Brooklyn	W 111–95	Kristaps Porzingis (28)	Enes Kanter (20)	Kanter, Ntilikina (5)	Madison Square Garden; 19,505	23–28
52	January 31	@ Boston	L 73–103	Enes Kanter (17)	Enes Kanter (17)	Jarrett Jack (4)	TD Garden; 18,624	23–29

February : 1–9 (home: 0–5; road: 1–4)

Game	Date	Team	Score	High points	High rebounds	High assists	Location Attendance	Record
53	February 2	@ Milwaukee	L 90–92	Kanter, Porzingis (17)	Enes Kanter (18)	Jarrett Jack (7)	Bradley Center; 18,717	23–30
54	February 4	Atlanta	L 96–99	Kristaps Porzingis (22)	Enes Kanter (12)	Jarrett Jack (4)	Madison Square Garden; 19,441	23–31
55	February 6	Milwaukee	L 89–103	Enes Kanter (19)	Enes Kanter (16)	Tim Hardaway Jr. (4)	Madison Square Garden; 19,812	23–32
56	February 8	@ Toronto	L 88–113	Michael Beasley (21)	Luke Kornet (10)	Jarrett Jack (6)	Air Canada Centre; 19,800	23–33
57	February 11	@ Indiana	L 113–121	Hardaway Jr., Kanter (17)	Michael Beasley (13)	Emmanuel Mudiay (10)	Bankers Life Fieldhouse; 17,923	23–34
58	February 12	@ Philadelphia	L 92–108	Michael Beasley (22)	Enes Kanter (13)	Hardaway Jr., Kanter (3)	Wells Fargo Center; 20,589	23–35
59	February 14	Washington	L 113–118	Tim Hardaway Jr. (37)	Enes Kanter (14)	Jarrett Jack (5)	Madison Square Garden; 19,812	23–36
60	February 22	@ Orlando	W 120–113	Trey Burke (26)	Enes Kanter (12)	Burke, Hardaway Jr. (6)	Amway Center; 18,846	24–36
61	February 24	Boston	L 112–121	Trey Burke (26)	Enes Kanter (12)	Trey Burke (8)	Madison Square Garden; 19,812	24–37
62	February 26	Golden State	L 111–125	Emmanuel Mudiay (20)	Enes Kanter (7)	Emmanuel Mudiay (7)	Madison Square Garden; 19,812	24–38

March : 3–12 (home: 2–5; road: 1–7)

Game	Date	Team	Score	High points	High rebounds	High assists	Location Attendance	Record
63	March 2	@ LA Clippers	L 105–128	Enes Kanter (18)	Enes Kanter (14)	Emmanuel Mudiay (7)	Staples Center; 17,190	24–39
64	March 4	@ Sacramento	L 99–102	Tim Hardaway Jr. (24)	Enes Kanter (16)	Trey Burke (6)	Golden 1 Center; 17,583	24–40
65	March 6	@ Portland	L 87–111	Tim Hardaway Jr. (19)	Enes Kanter (11)	Trey Burke (7)	Moda Center; 19,393	24–41
66	March 9	@ Milwaukee	L 112–120	Tim Hardaway Jr. (26)	Enes Kanter (8)	Kyle O'Quinn (6)	Bradley Center; 18,717	24–42
67	March 11	Toronto	L 106–132	Tim Hardaway Jr. (25)	Michael Beasley (11)	Mudiay, O'Quinn (5)	Madison Square Garden; 19,812	24–43
68	March 13	Dallas	L 97–110	Michael Beasley (21)	Enes Kanter (15)	Frank Ntilikina (6)	Madison Square Garden; 18,597	24–44
69	March 15	Philadelphia	L 110–118	Michael Beasley (24)	Michael Beasley (13)	Michael Beasley (7)	Madison Square Garden; 18,894	24–45
70	March 17	Charlotte	W 124–101	Tim Hardaway Jr. (25)	Enes Kanter (9)	Trey Burke (5)	Madison Square Garden; 17,760	25–45
71	March 19	Chicago	W 110–92	Tim Hardaway Jr. (22)	Enes Kanter (13)	Burke, Ntilikina (5)	Madison Square Garden; 18,835	26–45
72	March 21	@ Miami	L 98–119	Enes Kanter (23)	Enes Kanter (13)	Emmanuel Mudiay (4)	American Airlines Arena; 19,600	26–46
73	March 23	Minnesota	L 104–108	Tim Hardaway Jr. (39)	Enes Kanter (15)	Trey Burke (9)	Madison Square Garden; 18,914	26–47
74	March 25	@ Washington	W 101–97	Trey Burke (19)	Enes Kanter (11)	Emmanuel Mudiay (7)	Capital One Arena; 18,884	27–47
75	March 26	@ Charlotte	L 128–137 (OT)	Trey Burke (42)	Enes Kanter (13)	Trey Burke (12)	Spectrum Center; 14,487	27–48
76	March 28	@ Philadelphia	L 101–118	Beasley, Mudiay (22)	Enes Kanter (14)	Trey Burke (6)	Wells Fargo Center; 20,655	27–49
77	March 31	Detroit	L 109–115	Michael Beasley (32)	Kyle O'Quinn (12)	Trey Burke (15)	Madison Square Garden; 19,812	27–50

April : 2–3 (home: 1–3; road: 1–0)

Game	Date	Team	Score	High points	High rebounds	High assists	Location Attendance	Record
78	April 3	Orlando	L 73–97	Tim Hardaway Jr. (16)	Kyle O'Quinn (12)	Trey Burke (4)	Madison Square Garden; 19,812	27–51
79	April 6	Miami	W 122–98	Damyean Dotson (30)	Kyle O'Quinn (14)	Frank Ntilikina (9)	Madison Square Garden; 19,569	28–51
80	April 7	Milwaukee	L 102–115	Jarrett Jack (18)	Kyle O'Quinn (16)	Trey Burke (8)	Madison Square Garden; 19,812	28–52
81	April 9	Cleveland	L 109–123	Michael Beasley (20)	Lance Thomas (7)	Trey Burke (8)	Madison Square Garden; 19,449	28–53
82	April 11	@ Cleveland	W 110–98	Luke Kornet (23)	Damyean Dotson (10)	Trey Burke (9)	Quicken Loans Arena; 20,562	29–53

2017–18 season schedule

== Player statistics ==
Legend
GP	Games played	GS	Games started	MPG	Minutes per game
FG%	Field-goal percentage	3P%	3-point field-goal percentage	FT%	Free-throw percentage
RPG	Rebounds per game	APG	Assists per game	SPG	Steals per game
BPG	Blocks per game	PPG	Points per game

=== Regular season ===
Player	GP	GS	MPG	FG%	3P%	FT%	RPG	APG	SPG	BPG	PPG
Frank Ntilikina	78	9	21.9	.364	.318	.721	2.3	3.2	.8	.2	5.9
Kyle O'Quinn	77	10	18.0	.583	.235	.772	6.1	2.1	.5	1.3	7.1
Courtney Lee	76	69	30.4	.454	.406	.919	2.9	2.4	1.1	.2	12.0
Michael Beasley	74	30	22.3	.507	.395	.780	5.6	1.7	.5	.6	13.2
Lance Thomas	73	31	18.5	.382	.403	.830	2.4	.6	.4	.2	4.1
Enes Kanter Freedom	71	71	25.8	.592	.000	.848	11.0	1.5	.5	.5	14.1
Jarrett Jack	62	56	25.0	.427	.291	.840	3.1	5.6	.6	.1	7.5
Tim Hardaway Jr.	57	54	33.1	.421	.317	.816	3.9	2.7	1.1	.2	17.5
Doug McDermott^{†}	55	1	21.3	.460	.387	.755	2.4	.9	.2	.2	7.2
Kristaps Porziņģis	48	48	32.4	.439	.395	.793	6.6	1.2	.8	2.4	22.7
Damyean Dotson	44	2	10.8	.447	.324	.696	1.9	.7	.3	.0	4.1
Trey Burke	36	9	21.8	.503	.362	.649	2.0	4.7	.7	.1	12.8
Ron Baker	29	1	13.3	.339	.333	.769	1.0	1.6	.9	.2	2.4
Willy Hernangómez^{†}	26	0	9.0	.605	.200	.429	2.6	.8	.3	.3	4.3
Emmanuel Mudiay^{†}	22	14	22.4	.368	.196	.686	2.6	3.9	.9	.3	8.8
Luke Kornet	20	1	16.3	.392	.354	.727	3.2	1.3	.3	.8	6.7
Isaiah Hicks	18	0	13.3	.458	.222	.667	2.3	.9	.1	.2	4.4
Troy Williams^{†}	17	1	17.1	.490	.333	.704	3.5	.9	1.1	.2	7.5
Ramon Sessions^{†}	13	3	12.8	.321	.182	.800	1.4	2.1	.5	.1	3.7
Joakim Noah	7	0	5.7	.500		.500	2.0	.6	.3	.3	1.7
Mindaugas Kuzminskas	1	0	2.0	.000			.0	.0	.0	.0	.0

- ^{†} Denotes player spent time with another team in the season. Stats reflect time with the Knicks only.

== Transactions ==
=== Trades ===
July 14, 2017	To New York Knicks Scott Perry (new general manager)	To Sacramento Kings 2019 second-round pick Cash considerations
September 25, 2017	To New York Knicks Enes Kanter; Doug McDermott	To Oklahoma City Thunder Carmelo Anthony
February 7, 2018	To New York Knicks Johnny O'Bryant III; 2020 second-round pick 2021 second-round pick	To Charlotte Hornets Willy Hernangómez
February 8, 2018	To New York Knicks Emmanuel Mudiay	To Denver Nuggets and Dallas Mavericks Devin Harris (to Denver); Doug McDermott (to Dallas); 2018 2nd-round pick (Denver sends to Dallas); 2018 2nd-round pick (New York sends to Denver)

=== Free agency ===
==== Re-signed ====
Player	Signed	Contract
Ron Baker	August 7, 2017	2-year/$8.9M

==== Additions ====
Player	Signed	Contract	Former team
Luke Kornet	July 3, 2017	Two-way contract	Vanderbilt Commodores
Tim Hardaway Jr.	July 8, 2017	4-year/$71M	Atlanta Hawks
Michael Beasley	August 8, 2017	1-year/$2.12M	Milwaukee Bucks
Ramon Sessions	August 8, 2017	1-year/$2.3M	Charlotte Hornets
Jamel Artis	August 18, 2017	1-year/$815K	Pittsburgh Panthers
Nigel Hayes	August 18, 2017	1-year/$815K	Wisconsin Badgers
Xavier Rathan-Mayes	August 18, 2017	1-year/$815K	Florida State Seminoles
Jarrett Jack	September 15, 2017	1-year/$2.3M	New Orleans Pelicans
Isaiah Hicks	October 20, 2017	Two-way contract	North Carolina Tar Heels

==== Subtractions ====
Player	Reason left	New team
Maurice Ndour	Waived	(Russia) UNICS Kazan
Mindaugas Kuzminskas	Waived	(Italy) Olimpia Milano
