= 2017–18 New Orleans Pelicans season =

- Head coach: Alvin Gentry
- General manager: Dell Demps
- Owner(s): Tom Benson (until March 15, his death); Gayle Benson (March 15 onwards)
- Arena: Smoothie King Center

Results
- Record: 48–34 (.585)
- Place: Division: 2nd (Southwest); Conference: 6th (Western)
- Playoff finish: Conference Semifinals (lost to Warriors 1–4)
- Stats at Basketball Reference

Local media
- Television: Fox Sports New Orleans
- Radio: WWL-FM

The 2017–18 New Orleans Pelicans season was the 16th season of the New Orleans Pelicans franchise in the National Basketball Association (NBA). The Pelicans were coached by Alvin Gentry in his third year as head coach. They played their home games at the Smoothie King Center as members of the Western Conference's Southwest Division.

The team's second-leading scorer, DeMarcus Cousins, suffered a season-ending Achilles tendon injury during his subsequent final game as a Pelican on January 26, 2018, and missed the remainder of the season. Despite losing Cousins, the Pelicans clinched their first playoff berth since 2015 with a win over the Los Angeles Clippers on April 9, 2018. They finished the season 48–34 to finish in second place in the Southwest Division.

In the Playoffs, the Pelicans faced off against the third-seeded Portland Trail Blazers in the First Round. On April 14, 2018, the Pelicans won the first game in the First Round playoff series which marked the franchise's first playoff game win since the 2011 playoffs' First Round series against the Los Angeles Lakers. On April 21, the Pelicans completed the playoff series sweep over the Trail Blazers, marking the franchise's first series win since 2008. It also marked the first playoff series sweep in franchise history, and the first time that a team seeded sixth or lower had swept a First Round series since the NBA had expanded the First Round to a best-of-seven series. They advanced to the conference semifinals to face the second-seeded and defending champion and eventual NBA champion Golden State Warriors, the team that swept them in the First Round of the 2015 playoffs and were also champions that year. The Pelicans lost the series in five games and were eliminated from the playoffs.

== Draft ==
Round	Pick	Player	Position	Nationality	College / Club
2	31	Frank Jackson	PG	United States	Duke

Prior to the NBA draft, the Pelicans had only one second round pick, having traded their first-round pick, rookie Buddy Hield, Tyreke Evans, Langston Galloway, and the Philadelphia 76ers' original second round pick to the Sacramento Kings in a blockbuster trade for star center DeMarcus Cousins and Omri Casspi. On June 21, 2017, however, the Pelicans acquired the Washington Wizards' second round pick (No. 52 overall) in exchange for guard Tim Frazier. As a result, the Pelicans entered draft night with two second round and no first-round picks. On the night of the draft, the Pelicans traded away their second round pick (No. 40 overall) and cash considerations to the Charlotte Hornets in exchange for the Hornets' second round pick (No. 31 overall). With that pick, the Pelicans selected Duke point guard Frank Jackson. With the No. 52 overall pick, the Pelicans selected Xavier point guard Edmond Sumner and traded him to the Indiana Pacers for cash considerations.

== Roster ==
2017–18 New Orleans Pelicans roster
Players

Pos.	No.	Player	Height	Weight	DOB	From
C	42	Alexis Ajinça	7 ft 2 in (2.18 m)	248 lb (112 kg)	1988-05-06	INSEP
SG	2	Ian Clark	6 ft 3 in (1.91 m)	175 lb (79 kg)	1991-03-07	Belmont
SG	4	Charles Cooke (TW)	6 ft 5 in (1.96 m)	196 lb (89 kg)	1994-07-01	Dayton
C	0	DeMarcus Cousins	6 ft 11 in (2.11 m)	270 lb (122 kg)	1990-08-13	Kentucky
SG	27	Jordan Crawford	6 ft 5 in (1.96 m)	195 lb (88 kg)	1988-10-23	Xavier
PF	23	Anthony Davis	6 ft 10 in (2.08 m)	253 lb (115 kg)	1993-03-11	Kentucky
PF	13	Cheick Diallo	6 ft 9 in (2.06 m)	220 lb (100 kg)	1996-09-13	Kansas
SF	44	Solomon Hill	6 ft 7 in (2.01 m)	225 lb (102 kg)	1991-03-18	Arizona
SG	11	Jrue Holiday	6 ft 4 in (1.93 m)	205 lb (93 kg)	1990-06-12	UCLA
PG	15	Frank Jackson	6 ft 3 in (1.91 m)	205 lb (93 kg)	1998-05-04	Duke
SG	34	DeAndre Liggins	6 ft 6 in (1.98 m)	209 lb (95 kg)	1988-03-31	Kentucky
SF	21	Darius Miller	6 ft 8 in (2.03 m)	225 lb (102 kg)	1990-03-21	Kentucky
PF	3	Nikola Mirotić	6 ft 10 in (2.08 m)	238 lb (108 kg)	1991-02-11	Spain
SG	55	E'Twaun Moore	6 ft 4 in (1.93 m)	191 lb (87 kg)	1989-02-25	Purdue
C	50	Emeka Okafor	6 ft 10 in (2.08 m)	255 lb (116 kg)	1982-09-28	Connecticut
PG	9	Rajon Rondo	6 ft 1 in (1.85 m)	186 lb (84 kg)	1986-02-22	Kentucky

Coaches
Head coach
- Alvin Gentry
Assistant(s)
- Chris Finch
- Darren Erman
- Jamelle McMillan
- Kevin Hanson
- Elvis Valcarcel
- Jason Sumerlin (strength and conditioning)
- Duane Brooks (trainer)

Legend
- (DP) Unsigned draft pick
- (FA) Free agent
- (S) Suspended
- (GL) On assignment to G League affiliate
- (TW) Two-way affiliate player
- Injured

Roster
Updated: April 5, 2018

== Standings ==
=== Division ===
Southwest Division	W	L	PCT	GB	Home	Road	Div	GP
z – Houston Rockets	65	17	.793	–	34‍–‍7	31‍–‍10	12–4	82
x – New Orleans Pelicans	48	34	.585	17.0	24‍–‍17	24‍–‍17	9–7	82
x – San Antonio Spurs	47	35	.573	18.0	33‍–‍8	14‍–‍27	9–7	82
Dallas Mavericks	24	58	.293	41.0	15‍–‍26	9‍–‍32	5–11	82
Memphis Grizzlies	22	60	.268	43.0	16‍–‍25	6‍–‍35	5–11	82

=== Conference ===
Western Conference
#	Team	W	L	PCT	GB	GP
1	z – Houston Rockets *	65	17	.793	–	82
2	y – Golden State Warriors *	58	24	.707	7.0	82
3	y – Portland Trail Blazers *	49	33	.598	16.0	82
4	x – Oklahoma City Thunder	48	34	.585	17.0	82
5	x – Utah Jazz	48	34	.585	17.0	82
6	x – New Orleans Pelicans	48	34	.585	17.0	82
7	x – San Antonio Spurs	47	35	.573	18.0	82
8	x – Minnesota Timberwolves	47	35	.573	18.0	82
9	Denver Nuggets	46	36	.561	19.0	82
10	Los Angeles Clippers	42	40	.512	23.0	82
11	Los Angeles Lakers	35	47	.427	30.0	82
12	Sacramento Kings	27	55	.329	38.0	82
13	Dallas Mavericks	24	58	.293	41.0	82
14	Memphis Grizzlies	22	60	.268	43.0	82
15	Phoenix Suns	21	61	.256	44.0	82

== Game log ==
=== Preseason ===
2017 pre-season game log
Total: 1–3 (home: 0–2; road: 1–1)
Pre-season: 1–3 (home: 0–2; road: 1–1)

Game	Date	Team	Score	High points	High rebounds	High assists	Location Attendance	Record
1	October 3	Chicago	L 109–113	Anthony Davis (24)	Cousins, Davis (10)	Rajon Rondo (8)	Smoothie King Center; 16,962	0–1
2	October 6	@ Oklahoma City	L 91–102	Anthony Davis (14)	Anthony Davis (7)	Jrue Holiday (6)	Chesapeake Energy Arena; N/A	0–2
3	October 8	@ Chicago	W 108–95	Anthony Davis (37)	Anthony Davis (15)	DeMarcus Cousins (9)	United Center; 17,523	1–2
4	October 13	@ Memphis	L 101–142	Jordan Crawford (19)	Cunningham, Diallo (6)	Jordan Crawford (4)	FedExForum; N/A	1–3

2017–18 season schedule

=== Regular season ===
2017–18 game log
Total: 48–34 (home: 24–17; road: 24–17)
October: 3–4 (home: 1–2; road: 2–2)

Game	Date	Team	Score	High points	High rebounds	High assists	Location Attendance	Record
1	October 18	@ Memphis	L 91–103	Anthony Davis (33)	Anthony Davis (18)	Holiday, Moore (4)	FedExForum; 17,794	0–1
2	October 20	Golden State	L 120–128	Cousins, Davis (35)	Anthony Davis (17)	Jordan Crawford (7)	Smoothie King Center; 18,171	0–2
3	October 22	@ LA Lakers	W 119–112	Anthony Davis (27)	Anthony Davis (17)	DeMarcus Cousins (8)	Staples Center; 18,997	1–2
4	October 24	@ Portland	L 93–103	DeMarcus Cousins (39)	DeMarcus Cousins (13)	Jrue Holiday (7)	Moda Center; 19,446	1–3
5	October 26	@ Sacramento	W 114–106	DeMarcus Cousins (41)	DeMarcus Cousins (23)	Jrue Holiday (6)	Golden 1 Center; 17,583	2–3
6	October 28	Cleveland	W 123–101	Anthony Davis (30)	Anthony Davis (14)	DeMarcus Cousins (10)	Smoothie King Center; 18,539	3–3
7	October 30	Orlando	L 99–115	Anthony Davis (30)	DeMarcus Cousins (12)	Jrue Holiday (8)	Smoothie King Center; 14,004	3–4

November : 8–6 (home: 4–3; road: 4–3)

Game	Date	Team	Score	High points	High rebounds	High assists	Location Attendance	Record
8	November 1	Minnesota	L 98–104	DeMarcus Cousins (35)	Anthony Davis (10)	Cousins, Davis, Holiday (6)	Smoothie King Center; 14,788	3–5
9	November 3	@ Dallas	W 99–94	Anthony Davis (30)	DeMarcus Cousins (20)	Jrue Holiday (8)	American Airlines Center; 19,894	4–5
10	November 4	@ Chicago	W 96–90 (OT)	Anthony Davis (27)	Anthony Davis (16)	Jrue Holiday (6)	United Center; 21,254	5–5
11	November 7	@ Indiana	W 117–112	Anthony Davis (37)	Anthony Davis (14)	DeMarcus Cousins (6)	Bankers Life Fieldhouse; 15,014	6–5
12	November 9	@ Toronto	L 118–122	Jrue Holiday (34)	DeMarcus Cousins (15)	Jrue Holiday (11)	Air Canada Centre; 19,800	6–6
13	November 11	LA Clippers	W 111–103	DeMarcus Cousins (35)	DeMarcus Cousins (15)	Jrue Holiday (8)	Smoothie King Center; 17,624	7–6
14	November 13	Atlanta	W 106–105	E'Twaun Moore (24)	DeMarcus Cousins (16)	Cousins, Davis (7)	Smoothie King Center; 14,631	8–6
15	November 15	Toronto	L 116–125	DeMarcus Cousins (25)	DeMarcus Cousins (9)	Rajon Rondo (8)	Smoothie King Center; 15,654	8–7
16	November 17	@ Denver	L 114–146	Anthony Davis (17)	DeMarcus Cousins (6)	Jameer Nelson (9)	Pepsi Center; 16,816	8–8
17	November 20	Oklahoma City	W 114–107	Anthony Davis (36)	Anthony Davis (15)	Rajon Rondo (8)	Smoothie King Center; 16,765	9–8
18	November 22	San Antonio	W 107–90	Anthony Davis (29)	DeMarcus Cousins (15)	Davis, Rondo (4)	Smoothie King Center; 17,539	10–8
19	November 24	@ Phoenix	W 115–91	Anthony Davis (23)	DeMarcus Cousins (10)	Rajon Rondo (7)	Talking Stick Resort Arena; 16,574	11–8
20	November 25	@ Golden State	L 95–110	Anthony Davis (30)	Anthony Davis (15)	Holiday, Rondo (6)	Oracle Arena; 19,596	11–9
21	November 29	Minnesota	L 102–120	Jrue Holiday (27)	DeMarcus Cousins (10)	Rajon Rondo (7)	Smoothie King Center; 15,555	11–10

December : 7–8 (home: 4–4; road: 3–4)

Game	Date	Team	Score	High points	High rebounds	High assists	Location Attendance	Record
22	December 1	@ Utah	L 108–114	DeMarcus Cousins (23)	DeMarcus Cousins (13)	Rajon Rondo (11)	Vivint Smart Home Arena; 17,725	11–11
23	December 2	@ Portland	W 123–116	DeMarcus Cousins (38)	Dante Cunningham (12)	Rajon Rondo (10)	Moda Center; 18,730	12–11
24	December 4	Golden State	L 115–125	Jrue Holiday (34)	DeMarcus Cousins (11)	Rajon Rondo (11)	Smoothie King Center; 17,004	12–12
25	December 6	Denver	W 123–114	DeMarcus Cousins (40)	DeMarcus Cousins (22)	Holiday, Rondo (7)	Smoothie King Center; 15,353	13–12
26	December 8	Sacramento	L 109–116 (OT)	DeMarcus Cousins (38)	DeMarcus Cousins (11)	Jrue Holiday (5)	Smoothie King Center; 15,019	13–13
27	December 10	Philadelphia	W 131–124	Jrue Holiday (34)	DeMarcus Cousins (9)	Rajon Rondo (18)	Smoothie King Center; 16,878	14–13
28	December 11	@ Houston	L 123–130	Jrue Holiday (37)	DeMarcus Cousins (14)	Rajon Rondo (12)	Toyota Center; 18,055	14–14
29	December 13	Milwaukee	W 115–108	DeMarcus Cousins (26)	DeMarcus Cousins (13)	Jrue Holiday (8)	Smoothie King Center; 16,863	15–14
30	December 15	@ Denver	L 111–117 (OT)	DeMarcus Cousins (29)	Anthony Davis (12)	Jameer Nelson (7)	Pepsi Center; 17,584	15–15
31	December 19	@ Washington	L 106–116	Anthony Davis (37)	DeMarcus Cousins (13)	Jrue Holiday (5)	Capital One Arena; 16,529	15–16
32	December 22	@ Orlando	W 111–97	DeMarcus Cousins (26)	Cousins, Davis (11)	Rajon Rondo (8)	Amway Center; 16,922	16–16
33	December 23	@ Miami	W 109–94	Ian Clark (19)	DeMarcus Cousins (7)	DeMarcus Cousins (8)	AmericanAirlines Arena; 19,600	17–16
34	December 27	Brooklyn	W 128–113	Anthony Davis (33)	DeMarcus Cousins (14)	Rajon Rondo (25)	Smoothie King Center; 16,707	18–16
35	December 29	Dallas	L 120–128	Anthony Davis (33)	DeMarcus Cousins (20)	Cousins, Rondo (8)	Smoothie King Center; 16,878	18–17
36	December 30	New York	L 103–105	Anthony Davis (31)	DeMarcus Cousins (19)	Rajon Rondo (12)	Smoothie King Center; 16,947	18–18

January : 9–5 (home: 5–2; road: 4–3)

Game	Date	Team	Score	High points	High rebounds	High assists	Location Attendance	Record
37	January 3	@ Utah	W 108–98	Anthony Davis (29)	Anthony Davis (15)	Holiday, Moore (5)	Vivint Smart Home Arena; 18,306	19–18
38	January 6	@ Minnesota	L 98–116	DeMarcus Cousins (23)	DeMarcus Cousins (15)	DeMarcus Cousins (5)	Target Center; 18,978	19–19
39	January 8	Detroit	W 112–109	Anthony Davis (30)	Cousins, Davis (10)	Rajon Rondo (15)	Smoothie King Center; 12,874	20–19
40	January 10	@ Memphis	L 102–105	DeMarcus Cousins (29)	DeMarcus Cousins (8)	Jrue Holiday (6)	FedExForum; 14,312	20–20
41	January 12	Portland	W 119–113	Anthony Davis (36)	DeMarcus Cousins (19)	DeMarcus Cousins (8)	Smoothie King Center; 17,003	21–20
42	January 14	@ New York	W 123–118 (OT)	Anthony Davis (48)	Anthony Davis (17)	Cousins, Rondo (5)	Madison Square Garden; 19,812	22–20
43	January 16	@ Boston	W 116–113 (OT)	Anthony Davis (45)	Anthony Davis (16)	Rajon Rondo (8)	TD Garden; 18,624	23–20
44	January 17	@ Atlanta	L 93–94	Jrue Holiday (22)	DeMarcus Cousins (14)	DeMarcus Cousins (7)	Philips Arena; 10,894	23–21
45	January 20	Memphis	W 111–104	Jrue Holiday (27)	Anthony Davis (12)	Jrue Holiday (8)	Smoothie King Center; 18,212	24–21
46	January 22	Chicago	W 132–128 (2OT)	DeMarcus Cousins (44)	DeMarcus Cousins (24)	DeMarcus Cousins (10)	Smoothie King Center; 17,101	25–21
47	January 24	@ Charlotte	W 101–96	Davis, Holiday (19)	DeMarcus Cousins (13)	Cousins, Rondo (5)	Spectrum Center; 14,588	26–21
48	January 26	Houston	W 115–113	Anthony Davis (27)	DeMarcus Cousins (13)	DeMarcus Cousins (11)	Smoothie King Center; 17,186	27–21
49	January 28	LA Clippers	L 103–112	Anthony Davis (25)	Anthony Davis (17)	Jrue Holiday (7)	Smoothie King Center; 16,378	27–22
50	January 30	Sacramento	L 103–114	Anthony Davis (23)	Anthony Davis (13)	Jameer Nelson (8)	Smoothie King Center; 14,292	27–23

February : 8–3 (home: 3–1; road: 5–2)

Game	Date	Team	Score	High points	High rebounds	High assists	Location Attendance	Record
51	February 2	@ Oklahoma City	W 114–100	Anthony Davis (43)	Anthony Davis (10)	Rajon Rondo (13)	Chesapeake Energy Arena; 18,203	28–23
52	February 3	@ Minnesota	L 107–118	Anthony Davis (38)	Nikola Mirotic (12)	Jrue Holiday (9)	Target Center; 17,954	28–24
53	February 5	Utah	L 109–133	Jrue Holiday (28)	Anthony Davis (11)	Rajon Rondo (8)	Smoothie King Center; 14,293	28–25
—	February 7	Indiana	Postponed due to water leak in arena roof (March 21)				Smoothie King Center	
54	February 9	@ Philadelphia	L 82–100	Ian Clark (15)	Davis, Okafor (8)	Rajon Rondo (9)	Wells Fargo Center; 20,489	28–26
55	February 10	@ Brooklyn	W 138–128 (2OT)	Anthony Davis (44)	Anthony Davis (17)	Rajon Rondo (12)	Barclays Center; 16,572	29–26
56	February 12	@ Detroit	W 118–103	Anthony Davis (38)	Anthony Davis (10)	Jrue Holiday (12)	Little Caesars Arena; 14,453	30–26
57	February 14	LA Lakers	W 139–117	Anthony Davis (42)	Anthony Davis (15)	Jrue Holiday (11)	Smoothie King Center; 15,436	31–26
All-Star Break
58	February 23	Miami	W 124–123 (OT)	Anthony Davis (45)	Anthony Davis (17)	Jrue Holiday (9)	Smoothie King Center; 17,751	32–26
59	February 25	@ Milwaukee	W 123–121 (OT)	Jrue Holiday (36)	Anthony Davis (13)	Rajon Rondo (12)	Bradley Center; 18,717	33–26
60	February 26	Phoenix	W 125–116	Anthony Davis (53)	Anthony Davis (18)	Rajon Rondo (12)	Smoothie King Center; 14,302	34–26
61	February 28	@ San Antonio	W 121–116	Anthony Davis (26)	Anthony Davis (15)	Rajon Rondo (12)	AT&T Center; 18,418	35–26

March : 8–7 (home: 5–4; road: 3–3)

Game	Date	Team	Score	High points	High rebounds	High assists	Location Attendance	Record
62	March 4	@ Dallas	W 126–109	Jrue Holiday (30)	Cheick Diallo (15)	Rajon Rondo (10)	American Airlines Center; 19,798	36–26
63	March 6	@ LA Clippers	W 121–116	Anthony Davis (41)	Anthony Davis (13)	Jrue Holiday (17)	Staples Center; 16,412	37–26
64	March 7	@ Sacramento	W 114–101	Jrue Holiday (23)	Nikola Mirotic (10)	Jrue Holiday (8)	Golden 1 Center; 17,583	38–26
65	March 9	Washington	L 97–116	Darius Miller (20)	Nikola Mirotic (12)	DeAndre Liggins (5)	Smoothie King Center; 18,143	38–27
66	March 11	Utah	L 99–116	Anthony Davis (25)	Anthony Davis (11)	Jrue Holiday (10)	Smoothie King Center; 18,062	38–28
67	March 13	Charlotte	W 119–115	Anthony Davis (31)	Anthony Davis (14)	Rajon Rondo (17)	Smoothie King Center; 15,507	39–28
68	March 15	@ San Antonio	L 93–98	Jrue Holiday (24)	Anthony Davis (14)	Jrue Holiday (7)	AT&T Center; 18,418	39–29
69	March 17	Houston	L 101–107	Anthony Davis (26)	Anthony Davis (13)	Jrue Holiday (8)	Smoothie King Center; 18,495	39–30
70	March 18	Boston	W 108–89	Anthony Davis (34)	Anthony Davis (11)	Rajon Rondo (11)	Smoothie King Center; 18,277	40–30
71	March 20	Dallas	W 115–105	Anthony Davis (37)	Cheick Diallo (14)	Rajon Rondo (14)	Smoothie King Center; 14,484	41–30
72	March 21	Indiana	W 96–92	Anthony Davis (28)	Anthony Davis (13)	Rajon Rondo (6)	Smoothie King Center; 14,148	42–30
73	March 22	LA Lakers	W 128–125	Anthony Davis (33)	Anthony Davis (9)	Rajon Rondo (10)	Smoothie King Center; 18,037	43–30
74	March 24	@ Houston	L 91–114	Anthony Davis (25)	Cheick Diallo (9)	Jrue Holiday (4)	Toyota Center; 18,055	43–31
75	March 27	Portland	L 103–107	Anthony Davis (36)	Anthony Davis (14)	Jrue Holiday (11)	Smoothie King Center; 15,426	43–32
76	March 30	@ Cleveland	L 102–107	Jrue Holiday (25)	Anthony Davis (8)	Rajon Rondo (8)	Quicken Loans Arena; 20,562	43–33

April : 5–1 (home: 2–1; road: 3–0)

Game	Date	Team	Score	High points	High rebounds	High assists	Location Attendance	Record
77	April 1	Oklahoma City	L 104–109	Anthony Davis (25)	Anthony Davis (11)	Rajon Rondo (9)	Smoothie King Center; 18,500	43–34
78	April 4	Memphis	W 123–95	Anthony Davis (28)	Anthony Davis (12)	Rajon Rondo (13)	Smoothie King Center; 16,521	44–34
79	April 6	@ Phoenix	W 122–103	Anthony Davis (33)	Nikola Mirotic (16)	Jrue Holiday (10)	Talking Stick Resort Arena; 18,055	45–34
80	April 7	@ Golden State	W 126–120	Anthony Davis (34)	Anthony Davis (12)	Rajon Rondo (17)	Oracle Arena; 19,596	46–34
81	April 9	@ LA Clippers	W 113–100	Anthony Davis (28)	Nikola Mirotic (16)	Jrue Holiday (10)	Staples Center; 15,742	47–34
82	April 11	San Antonio	W 122–98	Jrue Holiday (23)	Davis, Mirotić (15)	Rajon Rondo (14)	Smoothie King Center; 18,573	48–34

2017–18 season schedule

=== Playoffs ===
2018 playoff game log
Total: 5–4 (home: 3–1; road: 2–3)
First Round: 4–0 (home: 2–0; road: 2–0)

Game	Date	Team	Score	High points	High rebounds	High assists	Location Attendance	Series
1	April 14	@ Portland	W 97–95	Anthony Davis (35)	Anthony Davis (14)	Rajon Rondo (17)	Moda Center; 19,882	1–0
2	April 17	@ Portland	W 111–102	Jrue Holiday (33)	Anthony Davis (13)	Holiday, Rondo (9)	Moda Center; 20,066	2–0
3	April 19	Portland	W 119–102	Nikola Mirotic (30)	Anthony Davis (11)	Rajon Rondo (11)	Smoothie King Center; 18,551	3–0
4	April 21	Portland	W 131–123	Anthony Davis (47)	Davis, Mirotic (11)	Rajon Rondo (16)	Smoothie King Center; 18,544	4–0

Conference Semifinals: 1–4 (home: 1–1; road: 0–3)

Game	Date	Team	Score	High points	High rebounds	High assists	Location Attendance	Series
1	April 28	@ Golden State	L 101–123	Anthony Davis (21)	Anthony Davis (10)	Rajon Rondo (11)	Oracle Arena; 19,596	0–1
2	May 1	@ Golden State	L 116–121	Anthony Davis (25)	Anthony Davis (14)	Rajon Rondo (10)	Oracle Arena; 19,596	0–2
3	May 4	Golden State	W 119–100	Anthony Davis (33)	Anthony Davis (18)	Rajon Rondo (21)	Smoothie King Center; 18,551	1–2
4	May 6	Golden State	L 92–118	Anthony Davis (26)	Anthony Davis (12)	Rajon Rondo (6)	Smoothie King Center; 18,513	1–3
5	May 8	@ Golden State	L 104–113	Anthony Davis (34)	Anthony Davis (19)	Jrue Holiday (11)	Oracle Arena; 19,596	1–4

2018 playoff schedule

== Player statistics ==
=== Regular season ===
Player	Pos.	GP	GS	MP	Reb.	Ast.	Stl.	Blk.	Pts.
Tony Allen^{†}	SF	22	0	273	47	9	11	3	103
Omer Asik^{†}	C	14	0	121	37	2	1	2	18
Charles Cooke	SG	13	0	38	2	1	1	0	6
Ian Clark	SG	74	2	1,455	127	110	33	10	551
DeMarcus Cousins	C	48	48	1,737	617	257	79	76	1,210
Jordan Crawford	PG	5	0	53	4	13	1	1	33
Dante Cunningham	SF	51	24	1,115	193	26	27	16	253
Anthony Davis	PF	75	75	2,727	832	174	115	193	2,110
Cheick Diallo	PF	52	0	581	211	19	11	21	254
Larry Drew	PG	7	0	55	2	8	0	0	15
Solomon Hill	SF	12	1	187	36	22	7	1	29
Jrue Holiday	SG	81	81	2,927	365	486	123	64	1,537
Mike James^{‡}	PG	4	0	18	1	6	1	0	4
Jalen Jones^{‡}	SF	4	0	19	3	0	0	0	5
Walt Lemon^{≠}	PG	5	0	35	2	5	0	1	17
DeAndre Liggins	PG	27	3	244	26	21	10	4	44
Darius Miller	SF	82	3	1,944	164	111	28	17	637
Nikola Mirotic^{≠}	PF	30	11	872	246	41	29	26	439
E'Twaun Moore	SG	82	80	2,586	238	187	79	12	1,022
Jameer Nelson^{†}	PG	43	0	897	96	156	79	76	221
Emeka Okafor^{≠}	C	26	19	353	120	8	8	25	221
Rajon Rondo	PG	65	63	1,703	263	533	70	10	537
Josh Smith	PF	3	0	12	4	0	0	0	2

After all games.
^{‡}Waived during the season
^{†}Traded during the season
^{≠}Acquired during the season

== Transactions ==
=== Trades ===
June 21, 2017	To New Orleans Pelicans 52nd pick in the 2017 NBA draft	To Washington Wizards Tim Frazier
February 1, 2018	To New Orleans Pelicans Nikola Mirotić; 2018 second round pick (from New Orleans via Chicago)	To Chicago Bulls Ömer Aşık; Tony Allen; Jameer Nelson; 2018 Top 5 protected first-round pick Right to swap 2021 second round picks with New Orleans

=== Free agency ===
==== Re-signed ====
Player	Signed
Jrue Holiday	5-year contract worth $126 million

==== Additions ====
Player	Signed	Former team
Tony Allen	1-year contract worth $2.3 million	Memphis Grizzlies
Ian Clark	1-year contract worth $1.6 million	Golden State Warriors
Charles Cooke	Two-way contract	Dayton Flyers
Jalen Jones	Two-way contract	Maine Red Claws
Darius Miller	2-year contract worth $4.3 million	(Germany) Brose Bamberg
Rajon Rondo	1-year contract worth $3.3 million	Chicago Bulls
Mike James	Two-way contract	Phoenix Suns
Emeka Okafor	Signed two 10-day contracts / 1-year deal	Delaware 87ers
Walter Lemon Jr.	Signed a 10-day contract	Fort Wayne Mad Ants

==== Subtractions ====
Player	Reason left	New team
Quinn Cook	Waived	Atlanta Hawks
Axel Toupane	Waived	(Lithuania) Žalgiris Kaunas
Donatas Motiejūnas	Unrestricted free agent	(China) Shandong Golden Stars
Hollis Thompson	Unrestricted free agent	(Greece) Olympiacios Piraeus
Jalen Jones	Waived	Dallas Mavericks / Texas Legends
Mike James	Waived	(Greece) Panathinaikos Athens

== Awards, records and milestones ==
=== Awards ===
Player	Award	Date awarded	Ref.
DeMarcus Cousins	Western Conference Player of the Week	October 30, 2017	
Anthony Davis	Western Conference Player of the Week	November 27, 2017	
Anthony Davis	NBA All-Star starter (5th appearance)	January 18, 2018	
DeMarcus Cousins	NBA All-Star starter (4th appearance)	January 18, 2018	
Anthony Davis	Western Conference Player of the Month (February)	March 1, 2018	
Anthony Davis	Western Conference Player of the Week	March 5, 2018	
Anthony Davis	Western Conference Player of the Month (March/April)	April 12, 2018	
Anthony Davis	All-Defensive First Team	May 23, 2018	
Jrue Holiday	All-Defensive First Team	May 23, 2018	
Anthony Davis	All-NBA First Team	May 24, 2018	
Anthony Davis	NBA blocks leader (3rd time)	June 17, 2018	

=== Records ===
==== Season ====
- Anthony Davis set franchise records in:
  - Most blocks in a game
    - 10 in a loss against the Utah Jazz on March 11, 2018
  - Most blocks in a half
    - 6 – tied his own franchise mark on the same day.
  - Field goals in a season (780)
  - Points in a season (2,110)
  - Points per game (28.1)
- DeMarcus Cousins set a franchise record in:
  - Defensive rebound percentage in a season (30.9%)
- Rajon Rondo set franchise records in:
  - Most assists in a game
    - 25 in a win against the Brooklyn Nets on December 27, 2017.
  - Most assists in a quarter
    - 9 in a win against the Detroit Pistons on January 8, 2018, tying a franchise record.

==== Playoffs ====
- Anthony Davis set a franchise record in:
  - Most points in a playoff game
    - 47 in Game 4 against the Portland Trail Blazers.
- Rajon Rondo tied a franchise record in:
  - Most assists in a playoff game
    - 17 in Game 1 against the Portland Trail Blazers. Tied the record with Chris Paul.

=== Milestones ===
- On November 22, 2017, Anthony Davis reached 7,938 career points, moving him to second in points scored in franchise history after passing Chris Paul.
- On January 18, 2018, both Davis and DeMarcus Cousins were selected as NBA All-Star starters, which marked the first time since 2009 that multiple New Orleans players have been selected to the All-Star game. It was also the first time in franchise history that multiple players have started the All-Star game.
- On January 28, 2018, Davis reached 3,857 career rebounds, giving him the all-time franchise high in rebounds after passing David West.
- On February 2, 2018, Davis passed David West in points scored, giving him the all-time franchise high with 8,702.
- The Pelicans finished second in the Southwest Division, which was the highest since the 2007–08 season.
- The Pelicans finished first in the league in:
  - Total minutes played in a season (19,995)
  - Minutes played per game (243.4)

==== Playoffs ====
- The Pelicans clinched their first playoff berth since 2015.
- On April 14, 2018, the Pelicans won the first game in the First Round playoff series which marked the franchise's first playoff game win since the 2011 NBA playoffs.
- On April 21, 2018, the Pelicans completed the playoff series sweep over the Portland Trail Blazers, marking the franchise's first series win since 2008. It was also the first playoff series sweep in franchise history, and the first time that a team seeded sixth or lower had swept a First Round series since the NBA had expanded the First Round to a best-of-seven series.
