= 2017–18 Dallas Mavericks season =

NBA professional basketball team season

- Head coach: Rick Carlisle
- President: Donnie Nelson
- General manager: Donnie Nelson
- Owner: Mark Cuban
- Arena: American Airlines Center

Results
- Record: 24–58 (.293)
- Place: Division: 4th (Southwest); Conference: 13th (Western)
- Playoff finish: Did not qualify
- Stats at Basketball Reference

Local media
- Television: FS Southwest; KTXA
- Radio: KESN

The 2017–18 Dallas Mavericks season was the 38th season of the franchise in the National Basketball Association (NBA). The Mavericks struggled during the season and finished the season with a 24–58 record, missing the playoffs for the second consecutive season, and suffered their worst record since the 1997-98 season.

== Draft ==
Round	Pick	Player	Position	Nationality	School
1	9	Dennis Smith Jr.	PG	United States	NC State

== Roster ==
2017–18 Dallas Mavericks roster
Players

Pos.	No.	Player	Height	Weight	DOB	From
PG	5	J. J. Barea	6 ft 0 in (1.83 m)	185 lb (84 kg)	1984–06–26	Northeastern
SF	40	Harrison Barnes	6 ft 8 in (2.03 m)	225 lb (102 kg)	1992–05–30	North Carolina
SG	8	Kyle Collinsworth	6 ft 6 in (1.98 m)	210 lb (95 kg)	1991–10–03	BYU
SG	30	Seth Curry	6 ft 2 in (1.88 m)	185 lb (84 kg)	1990–08–23	Duke
PG	11	Yogi Ferrell	6 ft 0 in (1.83 m)	180 lb (82 kg)	1993–05–09	Indiana
SF	10	Dorian Finney-Smith	6 ft 8 in (2.03 m)	220 lb (100 kg)	1993–05–04	Florida
SG	9	Aaron Harrison	6 ft 6 in (1.98 m)	220 lb (100 kg)	1994–10–28	Kentucky
SF	21	Jalen Jones (TW)	6 ft 7 in (2.01 m)	220 lb (100 kg)	1993–05–27	Texas A&M
PF	42	Maxi Kleber	6 ft 11 in (2.11 m)	220 lb (100 kg)	1992–01–29	Germany
SG	23	Wesley Matthews	6 ft 5 in (1.96 m)	220 lb (100 kg)	1986–10–14	Marquette
SF	20	Doug McDermott	6 ft 8 in (2.03 m)	219 lb (99 kg)	1992–01–03	Creighton
C	50	Salah Mejri	7 ft 2 in (2.18 m)	235 lb (107 kg)	1986–06–15	Tunisia
PF	6	Johnathan Motley (TW)	6 ft 10 in (2.08 m)	230 lb (104 kg)	1995–05–04	Baylor
C	3	Nerlens Noel (S)	6 ft 11 in (2.11 m)	228 lb (103 kg)	1994–04–10	Kentucky
PF	41	Dirk Nowitzki	7 ft 0 in (2.13 m)	245 lb (111 kg)	1978–06–19	Germany
C	7	Dwight Powell	6 ft 11 in (2.11 m)	240 lb (109 kg)	1991–07–20	Stanford
PG	1	Dennis Smith Jr.	6 ft 3 in (1.91 m)	195 lb (88 kg)	1997–11–25	NC State

Coaches
Head coach
- Rick Carlisle
Assistant(s)
- Darrell Armstrong
- Kaleb Canales
- Melvin Hunt
- Jamahl Mosley
- Larry Shyatt

Legend
- (DP) Unsigned draft pick
- (FA) Free agent
- (S) Suspended
- (GL) On assignment to G League affiliate
- (TW) Two-way affiliate player
- Injured

Roster
Updated: 2018–03–31

== Standings ==
=== Division ===
Southwest Division	W	L	PCT	GB	Home	Road	Div	GP
z – Houston Rockets	65	17	.793	–	34‍–‍7	31‍–‍10	12–4	82
x – New Orleans Pelicans	48	34	.585	17.0	24‍–‍17	24‍–‍17	9–7	82
x – San Antonio Spurs	47	35	.573	18.0	33‍–‍8	14‍–‍27	9–7	82
Dallas Mavericks	24	58	.293	41.0	15‍–‍26	9‍–‍32	5–11	82
Memphis Grizzlies	22	60	.268	43.0	16‍–‍25	6‍–‍35	5–11	82

=== Conference ===
Western Conference
#	Team	W	L	PCT	GB	GP
1	z – Houston Rockets *	65	17	.793	–	82
2	y – Golden State Warriors *	58	24	.707	7.0	82
3	y – Portland Trail Blazers *	49	33	.598	16.0	82
4	x – Oklahoma City Thunder	48	34	.585	17.0	82
5	x – Utah Jazz	48	34	.585	17.0	82
6	x – New Orleans Pelicans	48	34	.585	17.0	82
7	x – San Antonio Spurs	47	35	.573	18.0	82
8	x – Minnesota Timberwolves	47	35	.573	18.0	82
9	Denver Nuggets	46	36	.561	19.0	82
10	Los Angeles Clippers	42	40	.512	23.0	82
11	Los Angeles Lakers	35	47	.427	30.0	82
12	Sacramento Kings	27	55	.329	38.0	82
13	Dallas Mavericks	24	58	.293	41.0	82
14	Memphis Grizzlies	22	60	.268	43.0	82
15	Phoenix Suns	21	61	.256	44.0	82

== Game log ==
=== Preseason ===
2017 pre-season game log
Total: 4–2 (Home: 3–0; Road: 1–1)
Pre-season: 4–2 (home: 3–0; road: 1–2)

Game	Date	Team	Score	High points	High rebounds	High assists	Location Attendance	Record
1	October 2	Milwaukee	W 106–104	Yogi Ferrell (12)	three players (5)	Wesley Matthews (5)	American Airlines Center; 16,223	1–0
2	October 4	Chicago	W 118–71	Harrison Barnes (17)	Dirk Nowitzki (9)	Maalik Wayns (5)	American Airlines Center; 17,091	2–0
3	October 5	@ Orlando	L 89–112	Dennis Smith Jr. (13)	Jeff Withey (8)	Yogi Ferrell (3)	Amway Center; 15,849	2–1
4	October 9	Orlando	W 99–96	Dennis Smith Jr. (16)	Salah Mejri (9)	Dennis Smith Jr. (7)	American Airlines Center; 16,055	3–1
5	October 12	@ Atlanta	W 108–94	Gian Clavell (19)	Jeff Withey (8)	Maalik Wayns (6)	McCamish Pavilion; 6,759	4–1
6	October 13	@ Charlotte	L 96–111	Harrison Barnes (24)	Dirk Nowitzki (9)	Dennis Smith Jr. (9)	Spectrum Center; 10,018	4–2

2017–18 season schedule

=== Regular season ===
2017–18 game log
Total: 24–58 (Home: 14–27; Road: 9–32)
October: 1–7 (home: 1–4; road: 0–3)

Game	Date	Team	Score	High points	High rebounds	High assists	Location Attendance	Record
1	October 18	Atlanta	L 111–117	Noel, Smith Jr. (16)	Nerlens Noel (11)	Dennis Smith Jr. (10)	American Airlines Center; 19,709	0–1
2	October 20	Sacramento	L 88–93	Harrison Barnes (24)	Dirk Nowitzki (9)	J. J. Barea (10)	American Airlines Center; 19,273	0–2
3	October 21	@ Houston	L 91–107	Barea, Ferrell (19)	six players (5)	Yogi Ferrell (6)	Toyota Center; 18,055	0–3
4	October 23	Golden State	L 103–133	Wesley Matthews (19)	three players (7)	J. J. Barea (8)	American Airlines Center; 19,875	0–4
5	October 25	Memphis	W 103–94	Dennis Smith Jr. (19)	Harrison Barnes (6)	Dennis Smith Jr. (5)	American Airlines Center; 19,674	1–4
6	October 26	@ Memphis	L 91–96	Harrison Barnes (22)	Harrison Barnes (11)	Dennis Smith Jr. (9)	FedExForum; 15,839	1–5
7	October 28	Philadelphia	L 110–112	Harrison Barnes (25)	three players (6)	Dennis Smith Jr. (8)	American Airlines Center; 19,567	1–6
8	October 30	@ Utah	L 89–104	Dirk Nowitzki (18)	Dwight Powell (10)	Devin Harris (6)	Vivint Smart Home Arena; 16,221	1–7

November : 4–10 (home: 2–6; road: 2–4)

Game	Date	Team	Score	High points	High rebounds	High assists	Location Attendance	Record
9	November 1	@ LA Clippers	L 98–119	Dennis Smith Jr. (18)	Dirk Nowitzki (8)	Wesley Matthews (4)	Staples Center; 13,487	1–8
10	November 3	New Orleans	L 94–99	Harrison Barnes (26)	Salah Mejri (13)	J. J. Barea (5)	American Airlines Center; 19,894	1–9
11	November 4	@ Minnesota	L 99–112	Dennis Smith Jr. (18)	Dennis Smith Jr. (5)	J. J. Barea (6)	Target Center; 16,837	1–10
12	November 7	@ Washington	W 113–99	Harrison Barnes (31)	Salah Mejri (12)	Dennis Smith Jr. (8)	Capital One Arena; 14,505	2–10
13	November 11	Cleveland	L 104–111	Harrison Barnes (23)	Harrison Barnes (12)	Dennis Smith Jr. (7)	American Airlines Center; 20,378	2–11
14	November 12	@ Oklahoma City	L 99–112	Harrison Barnes (22)	Harrison Barnes (13)	Ferrell, Matthews (4)	Chesapeake Energy Arena; 18,203	2–12
15	November 14	San Antonio	L 91–97	Dennis Smith Jr. (27)	Harrison Barnes (8)	Dirk Nowitzki (6)	American Airlines Center; 19,535	2–13
16	November 17	Minnesota	L 87–111	Harrison Barnes (18)	Dirk Nowitzki (7)	Barea, Harris, Smith Jr. (4)	American Airlines Center; 19,459	2–14
17	November 18	Milwaukee	W 111–79	Wesley Matthews (22)	Dwight Powell (13)	Wesley Matthews (8)	American Airlines Center; 19,949	3–14
18	November 20	Boston	L 102–110 (OT)	Harrison Barnes (31)	Dirk Nowitzki (12)	Barea, Smith Jr. (4)	American Airlines Center; 20,302	3–15
19	November 22	@ Memphis	W 95–94	Harrison Barnes (22)	Harrison Barnes (9)	J. J. Barea (11)	FedExForum; 16,101	4–15
20	November 25	Oklahoma City	W 97–81	Dirk Nowitzki (19)	Harrison Barnes (12)	J. J. Barea (6)	American Airlines Center; 20,340	5–15
21	November 27	@ San Antonio	L 108–115	Matthews, Smith Jr. (19)	Harrison Barnes (8)	J. J. Barea (7)	AT&T Center; 17,918	5–16
22	November 29	Brooklyn	L 104–109	Harrison Barnes (17)	Harrison Barnes (8)	Harrison Barnes (6)	American Airlines Center; 19,327	5–17

December : 8–8 (home: 5–1; road: 3–7)

Game	Date	Team	Score	High points	High rebounds	High assists	Location Attendance	Record
23	December 2	LA Clippers	W 108–82	J. J. Barea (21)	Harrison Barnes (10)	J. J. Barea (10)	American Airlines Center; 19,245	6–17
24	December 4	Denver	W 122–105	Harrison Barnes (22)	Harrison Barnes (10)	J. J. Barea (9)	American Airlines Center; 19,419	7–17
25	December 6	@ Boston	L 90–97	Harrison Barnes (19)	Barnes, Ferrell, Powell (7)	J. J. Barea (6)	TD Garden; 18,624	7–18
26	December 8	@ Milwaukee	L 102–109	Wesley Matthews (29)	Harrison Barnes (8)	J. J. Barea (6)	BMO Harris Bradley Center; 15,889	7–19
27	December 10	@ Minnesota	L 92–97	Harrison Barnes (19)	Dwight Powell (6)	Yogi Ferrell (7)	Target Center; 13,094	7–20
28	December 12	San Antonio	W 95–89	Harrison Barnes (17)	Dwight Powell (12)	J. J. Barea (6)	American Airlines Center; 19,874	8–20
29	December 14	@ Golden State	L 97–112	Dirk Nowitzki (18)	Dirk Nowitzki (9)	Barea, Harris (6)	Oracle Arena; 19,596	8–21
30	December 16	@ San Antonio	L 96–98	Maximilian Kleber (21)	Yogi Ferrell (11)	Barea, Ferrell (6)	AT&T Center; 18,418	8–22
31	December 18	Phoenix	L 91–97	Harrison Barnes (26)	Maximilian Kleber (8)	J. J. Barea (6)	American Airlines Center; 19,245	8–23
32	December 20	Detroit	W 110–93	Harrison Barnes (25)	Harrison Barnes (7)	J. J. Barea (7)	American Airlines Center; 19,580	9–23
33	December 22	@ Miami	L 101–113	Yogi Ferrell (23)	Salah Mejri (5)	J. J. Barea (8)	American Airlines Arena; 19,600	9–24
34	December 23	@ Atlanta	L 107–112	Harrison Barnes (22)	Dirk Nowitzki (6)	J. J. Barea (12)	Philips Arena; 13,402	9–25
35	December 26	Toronto	W 98–93	J. J. Barea (20)	Harrison Barnes (10)	Barea, Smith Jr. (4)	American Airlines Center; 20,005	10–25
36	December 27	@ Indiana	W 98–94	Dirk Nowitzki (15)	Dirk Nowitzki (7)	J. J. Barea (7)	Bankers Life Fieldhouse; 17,923	11–25
37	December 29	@ New Orleans	W 128–120	Dennis Smith Jr. (21)	Dirk Nowitzki (12)	Dennis Smith Jr. (10)	Smoothie King Center; 16,878	12–25
38	December 31	@ Oklahoma City	W 116–113	Harrison Barnes (24)	J. J. Barea (7)	J. J. Barea (11)	Chesapeake Energy Arena; 18,203	13–25

January : 3–11 (home: 2–7; road: 1–4)

Game	Date	Team	Score	High points	High rebounds	High assists	Location Attendance	Record
39	January 3	Golden State	L 122–125	Wesley Matthews (22)	Nowitzki, Powell (8)	Dennis Smith Jr. (8)	American Airlines Center; 20,212	13–26
40	January 5	Chicago	L 124–127	Wesley Matthews (24)	Harrison Barnes (7)	J. J. Barea (9)	American Airlines Center; 20,073	13–27
41	January 7	New York	L 96–100	Harrison Barnes (25)	Barnes, Mejri (7)	Devin Harris (6)	American Airlines Center; 20,171	13–28
42	January 9	Orlando	W 114–99	Smith Jr., Nowitzki (20)	Yogi Ferrell (8)	J. J. Barea (12)	American Airlines Center; 19,306	14–28
43	January 10	@ Charlotte	W 115–111	Harrison Barnes (25)	Harrison Barnes (11)	Dennis Smith Jr. (6)	Spectrum Center; 14,462	15–28
44	January 13	LA Lakers	L 101–107 (OT)	Dennis Smith Jr. (23)	Yogi Ferrell (10)	Ferrell, Matthews (4)	American Airlines Center; 20,209	15–29
45	January 16	@ Denver	L 102–105	Dennis Smith Jr. (25)	Dwight Powell (7)	Yogi Ferrell (7)	Pepsi Center; 14,097	15–30
46	January 20	@ Portland	L 108–117	Wesley Matthews (23)	Harrison Barnes (10)	Dennis Smith Jr. (6)	Moda Center; 19,464	15–31
47	January 22	Washington	W 98–75	Harrison Barnes (20)	Harrison Barnes (10)	Dennis Smith Jr. (6)	American Airlines Center; 19,328	16–31
48	January 24	Houston	L 97–104	Wesley Matthews (29)	Salah Mejri (10)	Dennis Smith Jr. (6)	American Airlines Center; 19,378	16–32
49	January 26	Portland	L 93–107	Harrison Barnes (21)	Harrison Barnes (7)	Dennis Smith Jr. (7)	American Airlines Center; 19,876	16–33
50	January 27	@ Denver	L 89–91	Harrison Barnes (22)	Barnes, Matthews, Mejri, Smith Jr. (6)	Dennis Smith Jr. (6)	Pepsi Center; 19,520	16–34
51	January 29	Miami	L 88–95	Harrison Barnes (20)	Dwight Powell (10)	Dennis Smith Jr. (10)	American Airlines Center; 19,555	16–35
52	January 31	@ Phoenix	L 88–102	Dennis Smith Jr. (17)	Dirk Nowitzki (10)	Dennis Smith Jr. (6)	Talking Stick Resort Arena; 15,923	16–36

February : 3–7 (home: 2–2; road: 1–5)

Game	Date	Team	Score	High points	High rebounds	High assists	Location Attendance	Record
53	February 3	@ Sacramento	W 106–99	Harrison Barnes (18)	Dwight Powell (9)	J. J. Barea (11)	Golden 1 Center; 17,583	17–36
54	February 5	@ LA Clippers	L 101–104	Wesley Matthews (23)	Dwight Powell (10)	three players (5)	Staples Center; 15,127	17–37
55	February 8	@ Golden State	L 103–121	Dennis Smith Jr. (22)	Dirk Nowitzki (11)	J. J. Barea (8)	Oracle Arena; 19,596	17–38
56	February 10	LA Lakers	W 130–123	Dirk Nowitzki (22)	Dwight Powell (7)	J. J. Barea (9)	American Airlines Center; 20,162	18–38
57	February 11	@ Houston	L 97–104	Yogi Ferrell (20)	Dwight Powell (12)	Dennis Smith Jr. (11)	Toyota Center; 18,055	18–39
58	February 13	Sacramento	L 109–114	J. J. Barea (19)	Nowitzki, Powell (6)	J. J. Barea (13)	American Airlines Center; 19,801	18–40
59	February 23	@ LA Lakers	L 102–124	Barnes, Matthews (19)	Harrison Barnes (7)	J. J. Barea (6)	Staples Center; 18,997	18–41
60	February 24	@ Utah	L 90–97	J. J. Barea (17)	Dirk Nowitzki (12)	J. J. Barea (10)	Vivint Smart Home Arena; 18,306	18–42
61	February 26	Indiana	W 109–103	Harrison Barnes (21)	Dwight Powell (14)	J. J. Barea (9)	American Airlines Center; 19,536	19–42
62	February 28	Oklahoma City	L 110–111 (OT)	Harrison Barnes (26)	Dirk Nowitzki (8)	J. J. Barea (7)	American Airlines Center; 20,202	19–43

March : 4–10 (home: 2–5; road: 2–5)

Game	Date	Team	Score	High points	High rebounds	High assists	Location Attendance	Record
63	March 2	@ Chicago	L 100–108	Harrison Barnes (26)	Dwight Powell (11)	Wesley Matthews (4)	United Center; 21,017	19–44
64	March 4	New Orleans	L 109–126	Nowitzki, Smith Jr. (23)	Dwight Powell (11)	Dennis Smith Jr. (7)	American Airlines Center; 19,798	19–45
65	March 6	Denver	W 118–107	Yogi Ferrell (24)	Nerlens Noel (14)	Dennis Smith Jr. (11)	American Airlines Center; 19,504	20–45
66	March 10	Memphis	W 114–80	Harrison Barnes (25)	Dwight Powell (10)	Yogi Ferrell (6)	American Airlines Center; 19,579	21–45
67	March 11	Houston	L 82–105	Dwight Powell (20)	Kyle Collinsworth (10)	J. J. Barea (13)	American Airlines Center; 20,394	21–46
68	March 13	@ New York	W 110–97	Harrison Barnes (30)	Dorian Finney-Smith (9)	J. J. Barea (7)	Madison Square Garden; 18,597	22–46
69	March 16	@ Toronto	L 115–122 (OT)	Harrison Barnes (27)	Dwight Powell (8)	J. J. Barea (6)	Air Canada Centre; 19,800	22–47
70	March 17	@ Brooklyn	L 106–114	Dennis Smith Jr. (21)	Collinsworth, Jones, Nowitzki (7)	Yogi Ferrell (12)	Barclays Center; 13,877	22–48
71	March 20	@ New Orleans	L 105–115	Barnes, Nowitzki (19)	three players (6)	J. J. Barea (8)	Smoothie King Center; 14,484	22–49
72	March 22	Utah	L 112–119	J. J. Barea (23)	Dorian Finney-Smith (5)	J. J. Barea (8)	American Airlines Center; 19,725	22–50
73	March 24	Charlotte	L 98–102	Dennis Smith Jr. (21)	Nerlens Noel (12)	Dennis Smith Jr. (6)	American Airlines Center; 20,085	22–51
74	March 27	@ Sacramento	W 103–97	Harrison Barnes (20)	Maxi Kleber (9)	Barnes, Smith Jr. (6)	Golden 1 Center; 17,583	23–51
75	March 28	@ LA Lakers	L 93–103	Harrison Barnes (17)	Dirk Nowitzki (7)	Dennis Smith Jr. (8)	Staples Center; 18,997	23–52
76	March 30	Minnesota	L 92–93	Harrison Barnes (19)	Nerlens Noel (12)	Dennis Smith Jr. (7)	American Airlines Center; 20,244	23–53

April : 1–5 (home: 1–1; road: 0–4)

Game	Date	Team	Score	High points	High rebounds	High assists	Location Attendance	Record
77	April 1	@ Cleveland	L 87–98	Harrison Barnes (30)	Noel, Nowitzki (7)	Harrison Barnes (5)	Quicken Loans Arena; 20,562	23–54
78	April 3	Portland	W 115–109	Dennis Smith Jr. (18)	Kleber, Smith Jr. (8)	Dennis Smith Jr. (8)	American Airlines Center; 19,624	24–54
79	April 4	@ Orlando	L 100–105	Jalen Jones (15)	Kyle Collinsworth (9)	Yogi Ferrell (7)	Amway Center; 18,112	24–55
80	April 6	@ Detroit	L 106–113 (OT)	Johnathan Motley (26)	Johnathan Motley (12)	Dennis Smith Jr. (8)	Little Caesars Arena; 18,768	24–56
81	April 8	@ Philadelphia	L 97–109	Harrison Barnes (21)	Dwight Powell (10)	Dennis Smith Jr. (11)	Wells Fargo Center; 20,846	24–57
82	April 10	Phoenix	L 97–124	Johnathan Motley (21)	Kyle Collinsworth (11)	Kyle Collinsworth (8)	American Airlines Center; 20,041	24–58

2017–18 season schedule

== Player statistics ==
=== Regular season ===
Player	POS	GP	GS	MP	REB	AST	STL	BLK	PTS	MPG	RPG	APG	SPG	BPG	PPG
Yogi Ferrell	SG	82	21	2,282	249	201	64	9	838	27.8	3.0	2.5	.8	.1	10.2
Dwight Powell	C	79	24	1,672	444	91	67	32	671	21.2	5.6	1.2	.8	.4	8.5
Harrison Barnes	PF	77	77	2,634	468	152	49	14	1,452	34.2	6.1	2.0	.6	.2	18.9
Dirk Nowitzki	C	77	77	1,900	438	120	43	45	927	24.7	5.7	1.6	.6	.6	12.0
Maxi Kleber	PF	72	35	1,206	234	51	26	47	386	16.8	3.3	.7	.4	.7	5.4
Dennis Smith Jr.	PG	69	69	2,049	260	358	71	18	1,048	29.7	3.8	5.2	1.0	.3	15.2
J. J. Barea	PG	69	11	1,603	201	434	35	3	801	23.2	2.9	6.3	.5	.0	11.6
Wesley Matthews	SF	63	63	2,131	198	172	76	16	802	33.8	3.1	2.7	1.2	.3	12.7
Salah Mejri	C	61	1	729	246	35	22	67	214	12.0	4.0	.6	.4	1.1	3.5
Devin Harris^{†}	PG	44	1	807	85	85	33	8	373	18.3	1.9	1.9	.8	.2	8.5
Kyle Collinsworth	SF	32	2	480	107	56	17	9	101	15.0	3.3	1.8	.5	.3	3.2
Nerlens Noel	C	30	6	472	168	20	31	22	131	15.7	5.6	.7	1.0	.7	4.4
Doug McDermott^{†}	SF	26	3	596	66	29	9	4	235	22.9	2.5	1.1	.3	.2	9.0
Dorian Finney-Smith	PF	21	13	448	75	26	10	4	123	21.3	3.6	1.2	.5	.2	5.9
Antonius Cleveland^{†}	SG	13	0	81	10	2	6	4	10	6.2	.8	.2	.5	.3	.8
Jalen Jones^{†}	SF	12	0	162	35	4	5	1	69	13.5	2.9	.3	.4	.1	5.8
Johnathan Motley	PF	11	4	176	49	7	3	2	96	16.0	4.5	.6	.3	.2	8.7
Aaron Harrison	SG	9	3	233	24	11	9	2	60	25.9	2.7	1.2	1.0	.2	6.7
Jeff Withey	C	9	0	39	10	0	0	3	15	4.3	1.1	.0	.0	.3	1.7
Gian Clavell	SG	7	0	64	7	3	2	0	20	9.1	1.0	.4	.3	.0	2.9
Jameel Warney	PF	3	0	27	9	0	0	0	17	9.0	3.0	.0	.0	.0	5.7
Josh McRoberts	PF	2	0	6	0	0	0	0	0	3.0	.0	.0	.0	.0	.0
Scotty Hopson	SG	1	0	8	0	1	0	0	1	8.0	.0	1.0	.0	.0	1.0

- ^{†} Denotes player spent time with another team in the season. Stats reflect time with the Mavericks only.

== Transactions ==
=== Trades ===
June 28, 2017	To Dallas Mavericks Cash considerations	To Houston Rockets DeAndre Liggins
June 29, 2017	To Dallas Mavericks Cash considerations	To Houston Rockets Jarrod Uthoff
July 7, 2017	To Dallas Mavericks Josh McRoberts; Future second-round draft pick Cash considerations	To Miami Heat A. J. Hammons
February 8, 2018	To Dallas Mavericks Doug McDermott; Future second-round draft pick (from Portland via Denver)	To Denver Nuggets Devin Harris; Future second-round draft pick (from L.A. Clippers via New York)
February 8, 2018	To New York Knicks Emmanuel Mudiay

=== Free agents ===
==== Re-signed ====
Player	Signed
Dirk Nowitzki	July 6, 2017
Nerlens Noel	August 28, 2017

==== Additions ====
Player	Signed	Former Team
Brandon Ashley		(Germany) Alba Berlin
Gian Clavell	Signed two-way contract (converted from training camp deal).	(Puerto Rico) Brujos de Guayama
Antonius Cleveland	Signed two-way contract	Santa Cruz Warriors
Kyle Collinsworth	Signed two-way contract / two 10-day contracts / 1-year deal	Texas Legends / Dallas Mavericks
PJ Dozier		South Carolina Gamecocks
Aaron Harrison	Signed 10-day contract / 1-year deal	Reno Bighorns
Scotty Hopson	Signed 10-day contract	(Turkey) Galatasaray Odeabank
Jalen Jones	Signed two-way contract	New Orleans Pelicans / Greensboro Swarm
Maxi Kleber	Signed 1-year contract worth the veteran minimum	(Germany) Bayern Munich
Johnathan Motley	Signed two-way contract	Baylor Bears
Jameel Warney	Signed two 10-day contracts	Texas Legends
Maalik Wayns		(Israel) Maccabi Rishon LeZion
Jeff Withey		Utah Jazz

==== Subtractions ====
Player	Reason Left	New Team
Brandon Ashley	Waived	Texas Legends
Nicolás Brussino	Waived	Atlanta Hawks
Gian Clavell	Waived	(Turkey) Sakarya Büyükşehir Belediyesi
Antonius Cleveland	Waived	Atlanta Hawks
Kyle Collinsworth	Waived / Second 10-day contract expired	Dallas Mavericks / Texas Legends
P. J. Dozier	Waived	Oklahoma City Thunder / Oklahoma City Blue
Scotty Hopson	10-day contract expired	
Josh McRoberts	Waived	
Jameel Warney	Waived	Texas Legends
Maalik Wayns	Waived	(Spain) Divina Seguros Joventut
Jeff Withey	Waived	
