= Jalen Jones =

American basketball player (born 1993)

Free agent
- Position: Small forward / power forward

Personal information
- Born: May 27, 1993 (age 33) Dallas, Texas, U.S.
- Listed height: 6 ft 7 in (2.01 m)
- Listed weight: 220 lb (100 kg)

Career information
- High school: Mansfield Timberview (Arlington, Texas); Justin F. Kimball (Dallas, Texas)
- College: SMU (2011–2013); Texas A&M (2014–2016)
- NBA draft: 2016: undrafted
- Playing career: 2016–present

Career history
- 2016–2017: Maine Red Claws
- 2017–2018: New Orleans Pelicans
- 2017–2018: →Greensboro Swarm
- 2018: Dallas Mavericks
- 2018: →Texas Legends
- 2018–2019: Cleveland Cavaliers
- 2018–2019: →Canton Charge
- 2019: Baskonia
- 2019–2020: Capital City Go-Go
- 2020–2022: Varese
- 2022: JL Bourg
- 2022–2023: Hapoel Haifa
- 2023: U-BT Cluj-Napoca
- 2023: Cholet
- 2023–2024: Chorale Roanne
- 2024: Spartans Distrito Capital
- 2024: Converge FiberXers
- 2025–2026: Satria Muda Bandung

Career highlights
- Romanian League champion (2023); Romanian Cup champion (2023); All-NBA D-League Third Team (2017); NBA D-League All-Rookie Team (2017); NBA D-League All-Star (2017); First-team All-SEC – Coaches (2016); Second-team All-SEC – Coaches (2015)
- Stats at NBA.com
- Stats at Basketball Reference

Jalen Jones (born May 27, 1993) is an American professional basketball player who last played for Satria Muda Bandung of the Indonesian Basketball League (IBL). He played college basketball for the SMU Mustangs and the Texas A&M Aggies.

== High school career ==
Jones first attended Mansfield Timberview High School. In his junior season, he averaged 18.8 points and 9.8 rebounds and was selected first team all-district and first team all-region. In his senior season he transferred to Justin F. Kimball High School where he averaged 18.0 points and 9.0 rebounds and was named to the 2011 all-state tournament team.

== College career ==
After graduating from high school, Jones began his collegiate career at Southern Methodist University, where he averaged 14 points and 7 rebounds per game as a sophomore. He redshirted a year and transferred to Texas A&M. As a junior, he was named to the second-team All-SEC and teamed with Danuel House Jr. to lead the Aggies to the NIT. Jones was named to the coaches' first-team All-SEC as a senior, and the Aggies reached the NCAA Tournament. He averaged 15 points and seven rebounds per game during his final season at Texas A&M.

== Professional career ==
=== Maine Red Claws (2016–2017) ===
After going undrafted in the 2016 NBA draft, Jones joined the Toronto Raptors for the 2016 NBA Summer League. In five games for the Raptors, he averaged 3.2 points and 2.0 rebounds in 8.9 minutes per game. On September 26, 2016, he signed with the Boston Celtics. However, he was waived by the Celtics on October 20 after appearing in two preseason games. On October 31, Jones was acquired by the Maine Red Claws of the NBA Development League as an affiliate player of the Celtics.

=== New Orleans Pelicans (2017–2018) ===
Jones was signed to a two-way contract by the New Orleans Pelicans on August 2, 2017. For the majority of this season, Jones would split his playing time between New Orleans and a G-League affiliate, the Greensboro Swarm.

On January 8, 2018, Jones was waived by the Pelicans.

=== Dallas Mavericks (2018) ===
He signed a two-way contract with the Dallas Mavericks on January 11, 2018. Throughout the rest of the year, he split his playing time between the Mavericks and their G League affiliate, the Texas Legends. He was waived by the Mavericks on July 14, 2018.

=== Cleveland Cavaliers/Canton Charge (2018–2019) ===
On December 2, 2018, Jones was signed to a two-way contract by the Cleveland Cavaliers. Under the terms of the deal, he splits time between the Cavs and their G League affiliate, the Canton Charge. On January 15, 2019, Jones was waived by the Cavaliers.

=== Baskonia (2019) ===
On January 22, 2019, Jones signed with Kirolbet Baskonia of the Liga ACB and the EuroLeague until the end of the season.

=== Capital City Go-Go (2019–2020) ===
On October 16, 2019, the Washington Wizards announced that they had signed Jones. He was waived three days later. He was then added to the roster of the Capital City Go-Go of the NBA G League. Jones tallied 30 points, seven rebounds and two assists on November 10 in a win over the Grand Rapids Drive. He missed a game against the College Park Skyhawks on December 12 with a leg injury. On January 26, 2020, Jones scored 22 points and added seven rebounds, three assists and one block in a loss to the Canton Charge. He averaged 19 points and 8 rebounds per game.

=== Pallacanestro Varese (2020–2022) ===
On November 9, 2020, Jones signed with Pallacanestro Varese of the Italian Lega Basket Serie A. On November 16, it was announced that he would undergo season-ending surgery following the rupture of the Achilles tendon in his left leg. The Lega Basket communicated on January 8, that Jones was excluded from the rest of the 2020–21 season.

=== JL Bourg (2022) ===
On January 4, 2022, he has signed with JL Bourg of the LNB Pro A.

=== Hapoel Haifa (2022–2023) ===
On July 10, 2022, Jones signed with Hapoel Haifa of the Israeli Basketball Premier League.

=== U-BT Cluj-Napoca (2023) ===
On January 13, 2023, he signed with U-BT Cluj-Napoca of the Romanian Liga Națională.

=== Cholet (2023) ===
On October 6, 2023, he signed with Cholet of the LNB Pro A, to replace injured Kim Tillie.

=== Spartans Distrito Capital (2024) ===
On June 7, 2024, Jones signed with the Spartans Distrito Capital of the Superliga Profesional de Baloncesto (SPB).

=== Converge FiberXers (2024) ===
On September 17, 2024, Jones signed with the Converge FiberXers of the Philippine Basketball Association (PBA) to replace injured Scotty Hopson as the team's import for the 2024 PBA Governors' Cup.

On December 17, 2024, Jones signed with the Greek club Kolossos Rodou. He was released from the team only eleven days later, without appearing in a single game for them, due to poor conditioning.

== Career statistics ==
Legend
GP	Games played	GS	Games started	MPG	Minutes per game
FG%	Field goal percentage	3P%	3-point field goal percentage	FT%	Free throw percentage
RPG	Rebounds per game	APG	Assists per game	SPG	Steals per game
BPG	Blocks per game	PPG	Points per game	**Bold**	Career high

=== NBA ===
==== Regular season ====
Year	Team	GP	GS	MPG	FG%	3P%	FT%	RPG	APG	SPG	BPG	PPG
2017–18	New Orleans	4	0	4.8	.250	**1.000**	**1.000**	.8	.0	.0	.0	1.3
2017–18	Dallas	12	0	**13.5**	.397	.360	.588	**2.9**	.3	.4	**.1**	**5.8**
2018–19	Cleveland	**16**	0	13.4	**.419**	.357	.704	2.1	**.4**	**.6**	**.1**	5.1
Career		32	0	12.3	.400	.370	.674	2.3	.3	.4	.1	4.8

== Personal life ==
Jones is the son of Reginald and Yolanda Jones. He majored in university studies leadership.
