= 2017–18 Portland Trail Blazers season =

NBA professional basketball team season

- Division champions
- Head coach: Terry Stotts
- General manager: Neil Olshey
- Owners: Paul Allen
- Arena: Moda Center

Results
- Record: 49–33 (.598)
- Place: Division: 1st (Northwest); Conference: 3rd (Western)
- Playoff finish: First round (lost to Pelicans 0–4)
- Stats at Basketball Reference

Local media
- Television: NBC Sports Northwest
- Radio: KPOJ, Portland Trail Blazers Radio

The 2017–18 Portland Trail Blazers season was the franchise's 48th season in the National Basketball Association (NBA). This season is most notable for having a 13-game winning streak in their franchise history (tied), starting with a win over the Utah Jazz on February 23, but was ended with a 111–115 loss to the Houston Rockets on March 20. Despite that, the team still managed to clinch their 5th straight playoff berth on April 1, with a win over the Memphis Grizzlies. The franchise also unveiled a new logo and revised uniform set.

They finished the regular season with 49–33, which secured the 3rd seed and clinched the Northwest Division. In the playoffs, the Trail Blazers faced the 6th-seeded New Orleans Pelicans in the first round, and were swept in 4 games.

== Draft picks ==
Round	Pick	Player	Position	Nationality	School / club team
1	15	Justin Jackson	SF	United States	North Carolina
1	20	Harry Giles III	PF/C	United States	Duke
1	26	Caleb Swanigan	PF	United States	Purdue

The Trail Blazers entered the draft with three first-round selections: their own original pick at No. 15 and two others acquired through previous trades. They had traded their second-round selection to the Houston Rockets in 2013.

== Roster ==
2017–18 Portland Trail Blazers roster
Players

Pos.	No.	Player	Height	Weight	DOB	From
F	8	Al-Farouq Aminu	6 ft 9 in (2.06 m)	220 lb (100 kg)	1990–09–21	Wake Forest
G	2	Wade Baldwin	6 ft 4 in (1.93 m)	202 lb (92 kg)	1996–03–29	Vanderbilt
F/C	33	Zach Collins	7 ft 0 in (2.13 m)	230 lb (104 kg)	1997–11–19	Gonzaga
G/F	5	Pat Connaughton	6 ft 5 in (1.96 m)	210 lb (95 kg)	1993–01–06	Notre Dame
F/C	17	Ed Davis	6 ft 10 in (2.08 m)	245 lb (111 kg)	1989–06–05	North Carolina
F	4	Maurice Harkless	6 ft 9 in (2.06 m)	220 lb (100 kg)	1993–05–11	St. John's
F	10	Jake Layman	6 ft 9 in (2.06 m)	220 lb (100 kg)	1994–03–07	Maryland
C	11	Meyers Leonard	7 ft 1 in (2.16 m)	255 lb (116 kg)	1992–02–27	Illinois
G	0	Damian Lillard	6 ft 3 in (1.91 m)	195 lb (88 kg)	1990–07–15	Weber State
G	3	CJ McCollum	6 ft 3 in (1.91 m)	190 lb (86 kg)	1991–09–19	Lehigh
G	6	Shabazz Napier	6 ft 1 in (1.85 m)	175 lb (79 kg)	1991–07–14	Connecticut
C	27	Jusuf Nurkić	7 ft 0 in (2.13 m)	280 lb (127 kg)	1994–08–23	Bosnia and Herzegovina
C	19	Georgios Papagiannis	7 ft 3 in (2.21 m)	240 lb (109 kg)	1997–07–03	American School (GRE)
F	50	Caleb Swanigan	6 ft 8 in (2.03 m)	250 lb (113 kg)	1997–04–18	Purdue
G/F	1	Evan Turner	6 ft 7 in (2.01 m)	220 lb (100 kg)	1988–10–27	Ohio State
G	23	C. J. Wilcox (TW)	6 ft 5 in (1.96 m)	195 lb (88 kg)	1990–12–30	Washington

Coaches
Head coach
- Terry Stotts
Assistant(s)
- John McCullough
- Jim Moran
- Dale Osbourne
- Nate Tibbetts
- David Vanterpool
- Chris Stackpole (player development)

Legend
- (DP) Unsigned draft pick
- (FA) Free agent
- (S) Suspended
- (GL) On assignment to G League
- (TW) Two-way affiliate player
- Injured

Roster
Updated: 2018–03–24

== Standings ==
=== Division ===
Northwest Division	W	L	PCT	GB	Home	Road	Div	GP
y – Portland Trail Blazers	49	33	.598	–	28‍–‍13	21‍–‍20	9–7	82
x – Oklahoma City Thunder	48	34	.585	1.0	27‍–‍14	21‍–‍20	5–11	82
x – Utah Jazz	48	34	.585	1.0	28‍–‍13	20‍–‍21	7–9	82
x – Minnesota Timberwolves	47	35	.573	2.0	30‍–‍11	17‍–‍24	10–6	82
Denver Nuggets	46	36	.561	3.0	31‍–‍10	15‍–‍26	9–7	82

=== Conference ===
Western Conference
#	Team	W	L	PCT	GB	GP
1	z – Houston Rockets *	65	17	.793	–	82
2	y – Golden State Warriors *	58	24	.707	7.0	82
3	y – Portland Trail Blazers *	49	33	.598	16.0	82
4	x – Oklahoma City Thunder	48	34	.585	17.0	82
5	x – Utah Jazz	48	34	.585	17.0	82
6	x – New Orleans Pelicans	48	34	.585	17.0	82
7	x – San Antonio Spurs	47	35	.573	18.0	82
8	x – Minnesota Timberwolves	47	35	.573	18.0	82
9	Denver Nuggets	46	36	.561	19.0	82
10	Los Angeles Clippers	42	40	.512	23.0	82
11	Los Angeles Lakers	35	47	.427	30.0	82
12	Sacramento Kings	27	55	.329	38.0	82
13	Dallas Mavericks	24	58	.293	41.0	82
14	Memphis Grizzlies	22	60	.268	43.0	82
15	Phoenix Suns	21	61	.256	44.0	82

== Game log ==
=== Preseason ===
2017 pre-season game log
Total: 5–1 (home: 2–1; road: 3–0)
Pre-season: 5–1 (home: 2–1; road: 3–0)

Game	Date	Team	Score	High points	High rebounds	High assists	Location Attendance	Record
1	October 3	Phoenix	L 112–114	Damian Lillard (18)	Zach Collins (8)	Damian Lillard (4)	Moda Center; 15,507	0–1
2	October 5	Toronto	W 106–101	Damian Lillard (16)	Aminu, Swanigan (8)	Damian Lillard (8)	Moda Center; 15,505	1–1
3	October 8	@ LA Clippers	W 134–106	Damian Lillard (35)	Meyers Leonard (10)	Evan Turner (8)	Staples Center; 13,276	2–1
4	October 9	@ Sacramento	W 97–83	Jusuf Nurkić (16)	Al-Farouq Aminu (8)	Damian Lillard (3)	Golden 1 Center; N/A	3–1
5	October 11	@ Phoenix	W 113–104	Meyers Leonard (17)	Ed Davis (12)	Evan Turner (6)	Talking Stick Resort Arena; 13,230	4–1
6	October 13	Maccabi Haifa	W 129–81	Jake Layman (24)	Collins, Nurkić (8)	Isaiah Briscoe (7)	Moda Center; N/A	5–1

2017–18 season schedule

=== Regular season ===
2017–18 game log
Total: 49–33 (home: 28–13; road: 21–20)
October: 4–3 (home: 2–2; road: 2–1)

Game	Date	Team	Score	High points	High rebounds	High assists	Location Attendance	Record
1	October 18	@ Phoenix	W 124–76	Damian Lillard (27)	Al-Farouq Aminu (12)	Damian Lillard (5)	Talking Stick Resort Arena; 18,055	1–0
2	October 20	@ Indiana	W 114–96	CJ McCollum (28)	Al-Farouq Aminu (16)	Damian Lillard (7)	Bankers Life Fieldhouse; 15,325	2–0
3	October 21	@ Milwaukee	L 110–113	Lillard, McCollum (26)	Davis, Nurkić (11)	Evan Turner (7)	Bradley Center; 16,211	2–1
4	October 24	New Orleans	W 103–93	CJ McCollum (23)	Ed Davis (11)	Damian Lillard (7)	Moda Center; 19,446	3–1
5	October 26	LA Clippers	L 103–104	Damian Lillard (25)	Ed Davis (11)	Damian Lillard (6)	Moda Center; 18,694	3–2
6	October 28	Phoenix	W 114–107	Damian Lillard (25)	Ed Davis (11)	Damian Lillard (9)	Moda Center; 19,343	4–2
7	October 30	Toronto	L 85–99	Damian Lillard (36)	Ed Davis (8)	Aminu, Turner (3)	Moda Center; 18,505	4–3

November : 9–6 (home: 5–3; road: 4–3)

Game	Date	Team	Score	High points	High rebounds	High assists	Location Attendance	Record
8	November 1	@ Utah	L 103–112 (OT)	Damian Lillard (33)	Jusuf Nurkić (11)	Damian Lillard (8)	Vivint Smart Home Arena; 16,685	4–4
9	November 2	LA Lakers	W 113–110	Damian Lillard (32)	Ed Davis (8)	Lillard, McCollum, Nurkić, Turner (5)	Moda Center; 19,469	5–4
10	November 5	Oklahoma City	W 103–99	Damian Lillard (36)	Nurkić, Vonleh (8)	Damian Lillard (13)	Moda Center; 19,393	6–4
11	November 7	Memphis	L 97–98	CJ McCollum (36)	Davis, Vonleh (10)	Damian Lillard (6)	Moda Center; 18,692	6–5
12	November 10	Brooklyn	L 97–101	Jusuf Nurkić (21)	Damian Lillard (9)	Damian Lillard (6)	Moda Center; 19,393	6–6
13	November 13	Denver	W 99–82	McCollum, Nurkić (17)	Noah Vonleh (10)	Damian Lillard (7)	Moda Center; 18,895	7–6
14	November 15	Orlando	W 99–94	Damian Lillard (26)	Damian Lillard (11)	Damian Lillard (7)	Moda Center; 19,206	8–6
15	November 17	@ Sacramento	L 82–86	Damian Lillard (29)	Ed Davis (8)	Damian Lillard (4)	Golden 1 Center; 17,583	8–7
16	November 18	Sacramento	W 102–90	CJ McCollum (25)	Ed Davis (8)	Damian Lillard (6)	Moda Center; 19,522	9–7
17	November 20	@ Memphis	W 100–92	CJ McCollum (25)	Noah Vonleh (18)	Damian Lillard (4)	FedExForum; 15,785	10–7
18	November 22	@ Philadelphia	L 81–101	Damian Lillard (30)	Nurkić, Vonleh (11)	Shabazz Napier (4)	Wells Fargo Center; 20,605	10–8
19	November 24	@ Brooklyn	W 127–125	Damian Lillard (34)	Jusuf Nurkić (15)	Damian Lillard (9)	Barclays Center; 15,246	11–8
20	November 25	@ Washington	W 108–105	Damian Lillard (29)	Noah Vonleh (10)	Damian Lillard (6)	Capital One Arena; 18,092	12–8
21	November 27	@ New York	W 103–91	Damian Lillard (32)	Noah Vonleh (12)	Jusuf Nurkić (6)	Madison Square Garden; 18,409	13–8
22	November 30	Milwaukee	L 91–103	Jusuf Nurkić (25)	Jusuf Nurkić (11)	Damian Lillard (7)	Moda Center; 19,459	13–9

December : 5–8 (home: 1–5; road: 4–3)

Game	Date	Team	Score	High points	High rebounds	High assists	Location Attendance	Record
23	December 2	New Orleans	L 116–123	Damian Lillard (29)	Napier, Vonleh (7)	Damian Lillard (8)	Moda Center; 18,730	13–10
24	December 5	Washington	L 92–106	Damian Lillard (30)	Jusuf Nurkić (9)	Damian Lillard (9)	Moda Center; 19,241	13–11
25	December 9	Houston	L 117–124	Damian Lillard (35)	Ed Davis (9)	Damian Lillard (6)	Moda Center; 19,503	13–12
26	December 11	@ Golden State	L 104–111	Damian Lillard (39)	Noah Vonleh (9)	Evan Turner (4)	Oracle Arena; 19,596	13–13
27	December 13	@ Miami	W 102–95	CJ McCollum (28)	Al-Farouq Aminu (13)	Damian Lillard (6)	AmericanAirlines Arena; 19,600	14–13
28	December 15	@ Orlando	W 95–88	Damian Lillard (21)	Jusuf Nurkić (11)	Lillard, McCollum (4)	Amway Center; 16,963	15–13
29	December 16	@ Charlotte	W 93–91	CJ McCollum (25)	Zach Collins (10)	Damian Lillard (11)	Spectrum Center; 16,687	16–13
30	December 18	@ Minnesota	L 107–108	McCollum, Nurkić (20)	Damian Lillard (8)	Damian Lillard (13)	Target Center; 14,187	16–14
31	December 20	San Antonio	L 91–93	Damian Lillard (17)	Ed Davis (11)	CJ McCollum (6)	Moda Center; 19,393	16–15
32	December 22	Denver	L 85–102	CJ McCollum (15)	Ed Davis (7)	Shabazz Napier (5)	Moda Center; 19,473	16–16
33	December 23	@ LA Lakers	W 95–92	Maurice Harkless (22)	Al-Farouq Aminu (10)	Shabazz Napier (5)	Staples Center; 18,997	17–16
34	December 28	Philadelphia	W 114–110	CJ McCollum (34)	Jusuf Nurkić (12)	CJ McCollum (4)	Moda Center; 20,104	18–16
35	December 30	@ Atlanta	L 89–104	Shabazz Napier (21)	Jusuf Nurkić (11)	Shabazz Napier (6)	Philips Arena; 15,877	18–17

January : 11–5 (home: 7–0; road: 4–5)

Game	Date	Team	Score	High points	High rebounds	High assists	Location Attendance	Record
36	January 1	@ Chicago	W 124–120 (OT)	CJ McCollum (32)	Jusuf Nurkić (15)	CJ McCollum (8)	United Center; 20,860	19–17
37	January 2	@ Cleveland	L 110–127	Damian Lillard (25)	Al-Farouq Aminu (9)	Damian Lillard (6)	Quicken Loans Arena; 20,562	19–18
38	January 5	Atlanta	W 110–89	CJ McCollum (20)	Jusuf Nurkić (9)	Lillard, McCollum, Napier (6)	Moda Center; 19,393	20–18
39	January 7	San Antonio	W 111–110	CJ McCollum (25)	Jusuf Nurkić (13)	McCollum, Napier (7)	Moda Center; 19,393	21–18
40	January 9	@ Oklahoma City	W 117–106	CJ McCollum (27)	Jusuf Nurkić (8)	CJ McCollum (7)	Chesapeake Energy Arena; 18,203	22–18
41	January 10	@ Houston	L 112–121	Damian Lillard (29)	Ed Davis (10)	Damian Lillard (8)	Toyota Center; 18,055	22–19
42	January 12	@ New Orleans	L 113–119	Lillard, McCollum (23)	Al-Farouq Aminu (11)	Damian Lillard (8)	Smoothie King Center; 17,003	22–20
43	January 14	@ Minnesota	L 103–120	Damian Lillard (21)	Ed Davis (8)	Damian Lillard (8)	Target Center; 14,739	22–21
44	January 16	Phoenix	W 118–111	Damian Lillard (31)	Al-Farouq Aminu (9)	Damian Lillard (7)	Moda Center; 18,604	23–21
45	January 18	Indiana	W 100–86	Damian Lillard (26)	Jusuf Nurkić (17)	Damian Lillard (8)	Moda Center; 19,071	24–21
46	January 20	Dallas	W 117–108	Damian Lillard (31)	Ed Davis (10)	Damian Lillard (9)	Moda Center; 19,464	25–21
47	January 22	@ Denver	L 101–104	Damian Lillard (25)	Jusuf Nurkić (12)	Damian Lillard (8)	Pepsi Center; 14,474	25–22
48	January 24	Minnesota	W 123–114	Damian Lillard (31)	Ed Davis (10)	Lillard, Turner (6)	Moda Center; 18,920	26–22
49	January 26	@ Dallas	W 107–93	Damian Lillard (29)	Al-Farouq Aminu (12)	CJ McCollum (5)	American Airlines Center; 19,876	27–22
50	January 30	@ LA Clippers	W 104–96	Damian Lillard (28)	Jusuf Nurkić (20)	Damian Lillard (7)	Staples Center; 16,705	28–22
51	January 31	Chicago	W 124–108	CJ McCollum (50)	Jusuf Nurkić (9)	Damian Lillard (7)	Moda Center; 19,000	29–22

February : 6–4 (home: 3–1; road: 3–3)

Game	Date	Team	Score	High points	High rebounds	High assists	Location Attendance	Record
52	February 2	@ Toronto	L 105–130	Damian Lillard (37)	Al-Farouq Aminu (9)	Damian Lillard (10)	Air Canada Centre; 19,800	29–23
53	February 4	@ Boston	L 96–97	CJ McCollum (22)	Aminu, Harkless, Nurkić (8)	Damian Lillard (9)	TD Garden; 18,624	29–24
54	February 5	@ Detroit	L 91–111	Damian Lillard (20)	Al-Farouq Aminu (13)	Damian Lillard (5)	Little Caesars Arena; 13,810	29–25
55	February 8	Charlotte	W 109–103 (OT)	Jusuf Nurkić (24)	Al-Farouq Aminu (15)	Damian Lillard (8)	Moda Center; 19,178	30–25
56	February 9	@ Sacramento	W 118–100	Damian Lillard (50)	Ed Davis (14)	Damian Lillard (6)	Golden 1 Center; 17,583	31–25
57	February 11	Utah	L 96–115	Damian Lillard (39)	Ed Davis (12)	CJ McCollum (4)	Moda Center; 19,730	31–26
58	February 14	Golden State	W 123–117	Damian Lillard (44)	Jusuf Nurkić (13)	Damian Lillard (8)	Moda Center; 19,520	32–26
All-Star Break
59	February 23	@ Utah	W 100–81	CJ McCollum (26)	Aminu, Davis (8)	Lillard, Turner (3)	Vivint Smart Home Arena; 18,306	33–26
60	February 24	@ Phoenix	W 106–104	Damian Lillard (40)	Jusuf Nurkić (13)	Damian Lillard (5)	Talking Stick Resort Arena; 17,112	34–26
61	February 27	Sacramento	W 116–99	Damian Lillard (26)	Ed Davis (12)	Damian Lillard (12)	Moda Center; 19,468	35–26

March : 12–3 (home: 8–2; road: 4–1)

Game	Date	Team	Score	High points	High rebounds	High assists	Location Attendance	Record
62	March 1	Minnesota	W 108–99	Damian Lillard (35)	Al-Farouq Aminu (12)	Evan Turner (6)	Moda Center; 19,533	36–26
63	March 3	Oklahoma City	W 108–100	CJ McCollum (28)	Ed Davis (10)	Damian Lillard (7)	Moda Center; 20,063	37–26
64	March 5	@ LA Lakers	W 108–103	Damian Lillard (39)	Jusuf Nurkić (16)	Damian Lillard (6)	Staples Center; 18,997	38–26
65	March 6	NY Knicks	W 111–87	Damian Lillard (37)	Ed Davis (14)	Four players (4)	Moda Center; 19,393	39–26
66	March 9	Golden State	W 125–108	CJ McCollum (30)	Ed Davis (15)	Damian Lillard (8)	Moda Center; 19,487	40–26
67	March 12	Miami	W 115–99	Damian Lillard (32)	Jusuf Nurkić (16)	Damian Lillard (10)	Moda Center; 19,786	41–26
68	March 15	Cleveland	W 113–105	CJ McCollum (29)	Jusuf Nurkić (10)	Damian Lillard (9)	Moda Center; 19,806	42–26
69	March 17	Detroit	W 100–87	Damian Lillard (24)	Al-Farouq Aminu (12)	Damian Lillard (8)	Moda Center; 19,727	43–26
70	March 18	@ LA Clippers	W 122–109	Damian Lillard (23)	Jusuf Nurkić (12)	Shabazz Napier (8)	Staples Center; 17,776	44–26
71	March 20	Houston	L 111–115	Al-Farouq Aminu (22)	Jusuf Nurkić (11)	Damian Lillard (6)	Moda Center; 20,012	44–27
72	March 23	Boston	L 100–105	Lillard, McCollum (26)	Al-Farouq Aminu (10)	Damian Lillard (8)	Moda Center; 19,575	44–28
73	March 25	@ Oklahoma City	W 108–105	CJ McCollum (34)	Jusuf Nurkić (12)	Damian Lillard (5)	Chesapeake Energy Arena; 18,203	45–28
74	March 27	@ New Orleans	W 107–103	Damian Lillard (41)	Aminu, Nurkić (10)	Damian Lillard (6)	Smoothie King Center; 15,426	46–28
75	March 28	@ Memphis	L 103–108	CJ McCollum (42)	Jusuf Nurkić (8)	CJ McCollum (5)	FedExForum; 16,050	46–29
76	March 30	LA Clippers	W 105–96	Jusuf Nurkić (21)	Jusuf Nurkić (12)	Damian Lillard (6)	Moda Center; 20,013	47–29

April : 2–4 (home: 2–0; road: 0–4)

Game	Date	Team	Score	High points	High rebounds	High assists	Location Attendance	Record
77	April 1	Memphis	W 113–98	Damian Lillard (27)	Al-Farouq Aminu (10)	Lillard, McCollum (9)	Moda Center; 19,545	48–29
78	April 3	@ Dallas	L 109–115	Damian Lillard (29)	Jusuf Nurkić (13)	Lillard, McCollum (8)	American Airlines Center; 19,624	48–30
79	April 5	@ Houston	L 94–96	CJ McCollum (16)	Jusuf Nurkić (11)	CJ McCollum (4)	Toyota Center; 18,055	48–31
80	April 7	@ San Antonio	L 105–116	Damian Lillard (33)	Jusuf Nurkić (12)	Damian Lillard (5)	AT&T Center; 18,610	48–32
81	April 9	@ Denver	L 82–88	Damian Lillard (25)	Jusuf Nurkić (19)	Lillard, McCollum (3)	Pepsi Center; 17,467	48–33
82	April 11	Utah	W 102–93	Damian Lillard (36)	Nurkić, Aminu (9)	Damian Lillard (10)	Moda Center; 20,186	49–33

2017–18 season schedule

=== Playoffs ===
2018 playoff game log
Total: 0–4 (home: 0–2; road: 0–2)
First Round: 0–4 (home: 0–2; road: 0–2)

Game	Date	Team	Score	High points	High rebounds	High assists	Location Attendance	Series
1	April 14	New Orleans	L 95–97	CJ McCollum (19)	Jusuf Nurkic (11)	Damian Lillard (7)	Moda Center; 19,882	0–1
2	April 17	New Orleans	L 102–111	CJ McCollum (22)	Al-Farouq Aminu (15)	CJ McCollum (6)	Moda Center; 20,062	0–2
3	April 19	@ New Orleans	L 102–119	CJ McCollum (22)	Aminu, Davis (8)	Maurice Harkless (4)	Smoothie King Center; 18,551	0–3
4	April 21	@ New Orleans	L 123–131	CJ McCollum (38)	Jusuf Nurkic (11)	Damian Lillard (6)	Smoothie King Center; 18,544	0–4

2018 playoff schedule

== Player statistics ==
Legend
GP	Games played	GS	Games started	MPG	Minutes per game
FG%	Field-goal percentage	3P%	3-point field-goal percentage	FT%	Free-throw percentage
RPG	Rebounds per game	APG	Assists per game	SPG	Steals per game
BPG	Blocks per game	PPG	Points per game

=== Regular season ===
Portland Trail Blazers statistics
Player	GP	GS	MPG	FG%	3P%	FT%	RPG	APG	SPG	BPG	PPG
Pat Connaughton	82	5	18.1	.423	.352	.841	2.0	1.1	.3	.3	5.4
CJ McCollum	81	81	36.1	.443	.397	.836	4.0	3.4	1.0	.4	21.4
Jusuf Nurkić	79	79	26.4	.505	.000	.630	9.0	1.8	.8	1.4	14.3
Evan Turner	79	40	25.7	.447	.318	.850	3.1	2.2	.6	.4	8.2
Ed Davis	78	0	18.9	.582	.000	.667	7.4	.5	.4	.7	5.3
Shabazz Napier	74	9	20.7	.420	.376	.841	2.3	2.0	1.1	.2	8.7
Damian Lillard	73	73	36.6	.439	.361	.916	4.5	6.6	1.1	.4	26.9
Al-Farouq Aminu	69	67	30.0	.395	.369	.738	7.6	1.2	1.1	.6	9.3
Zach Collins	66	1	15.8	.398	.310	.643	3.3	.8	.3	.5	4.4
Maurice Harkless	59	37	21.4	.495	.415	.712	2.7	.9	.8	.7	6.5
Jake Layman	35	1	4.6	.298	.200	.667	.5	.3	.2	.1	1.0
Noah Vonleh^{†}	33	12	14.4	.490	.333	.742	5.1	.4	.2	.3	3.6
Meyers Leonard	33	2	7.7	.590	.423	.818	2.1	.5	.2	.0	3.4
Caleb Swanigan	27	3	7.0	.400	.125	.667	2.0	.5	.2	.1	2.3
Wade Baldwin IV	7	0	11.4	.667	.800	.600	1.1	.7	.3	.1	5.4
Georgios Papagiannis^{†}	1	0	4.0	1.000			1.0	.0	2.0	.0	2.0

=== Playoffs ===
Portland Trail Blazers statistics
Player	GP	GS	MPG	FG%	3P%	FT%	RPG	APG	SPG	BPG	PPG
Damian Lillard	4	4	40.5	.352	.300	.882	4.5	4.8	1.3	.0	18.5
CJ McCollum	4	4	38.8	.519	.423	.769	2.0	3.5	1.3	.3	25.3
Al-Farouq Aminu	4	4	32.8	.519	.433	1.000	9.0	1.3	1.0	.5	17.3
Jusuf Nurkić	4	4	23.5	.487		.818	8.0	1.0	1.5	1.3	11.8
Ed Davis	4	0	17.8	.500		.250	8.0	.0	.0	.3	2.8
Zach Collins	4	0	17.5	.367	.214	.750	3.0	1.5	.8	.5	7.0
Pat Connaughton	4	0	14.8	.400	.200	1.000	1.0	1.5	.3	.3	4.0
Wade Baldwin IV	4	0	4.8	.250	1.000	.500	.8	.8	.3	.3	1.0
Evan Turner	3	3	29.0	.364	.286	1.000	4.0	3.3	1.0	.3	9.3
Maurice Harkless	2	1	26.5	.538	.333		4.0	2.0	.0	.5	8.0
Shabazz Napier	2	0	17.5	.455	.000	.500	1.0	1.5	1.5	.0	5.5
Meyers Leonard	2	0	4.0	1.000			2.0	.0	.0	.0	4.0
Jake Layman	1	0	8.0	1.000			1.0	1.0	2.0	.0	6.0
Caleb Swanigan	1	0	8.0	.000	.000	.750	2.0	1.0	.0	.0	3.0

- ^{†} Denotes player spent time with another team in the season. Stats reflect time with the Trail Blazers only.

== Transactions ==
=== Trades ===
June 22, 2017	To Portland Trail Blazers Draft right to Zach Collins (Pick 10)	To Sacramento Kings Draft rights to Justin Jackson (Pick 15); Draft rights to Harry Giles (Pick 20)
June 28, 2017	To Portland Trail Blazers Cash considerations	To Houston Rockets Tim Quarterman

=== Free agency ===
==== Re-signed ====
Player	Signed

==== Additions ====
Player	Signed	Former team
C. J. Wilcox	Two-way contract	Orlando Magic
Wade Baldwin IV	Two-way contract	Memphis Grizzlies

==== Subtractions ====
Player	Reason left	New team
