= 2017–18 Memphis Grizzlies season =

2017-18 basketball season

- Head coach: David Fizdale (until November 27); J. B. Bickerstaff (interim)
- General manager: Chris Wallace
- Owners: Robert Pera
- Arena: FedExForum

Results
- Record: 22–60 (.268)
- Place: Division: 5th (Southwest); Conference: 14th (Western)
- Playoff finish: Did not qualify
- Stats at Basketball Reference

Local media
- Television: Fox Sports Tennessee; Fox Sports Southeast
- Radio: WMFS-FM

The 2017–18 Memphis Grizzlies season was the 23rd season of the franchise in the National Basketball Association (NBA). During this season, the Grizzlies announced that both Zach Randolph and Tony Allen would have their numbers be retired for the franchise at some point in the future, both of whom would be the first for this franchise's history. On November 27, 2017, head coach David Fizdale was fired after an eight-game losing streak and a publicized benching of Marc Gasol. Associate head coach J. B. Bickerstaff was promoted as an interim head coach.

The Grizzlies also missed the playoffs for the first time since the 2009–10 NBA season, as well as recording one of their longest losing streaks in franchise history near the end of the season with 19 straight losses from January 31 to March 17, 2018, beginning the losing steak with a 101–105 loss to the Indiana Pacers, but finally snapping their losing streak with a 101–94 victory over the Denver Nuggets on Saint Patrick's Day.

The Grizzlies would then suffer their worst loss in franchise history during the regular season on March 22, 2018, losing to the Charlotte Hornets 79–140 in a 61-point blowout. Star point guard Mike Conley Jr. played only 12 games due to injury.

It was their first 60+ losing record since 2007–08, and also their first season since 2008–09 without Zach Randolph, as he signed with the Sacramento Kings via free agency in July 2017. The signing reunited him with Grizzlies teammate Vince Carter, who also signed with them the same day. Randolph led the Grizzlies to seven playoff appearances and one Conference Finals appearance (2013).

== Draft ==
Round	Pick	Player	Position	Nationality	College / Club
2	35	Ivan Rabb	PF	United States	California
2	45	Dillon Brooks	SG	United States	Oregon

The Grizzlies originally did not have a pick in the 2017 NBA Draft, but they did acquire the Orlando Magic's 35th pick and Houston Rockets' 45th pick through trades involving future second-round draft picks. As a result, they acquired power forward Ivan Rabb out of California and shooting guard Dillon Brooks out of Oregon respectively.

== Roster ==
2017–18 Memphis Grizzlies roster
Players

Pos.	No.	Player	Height	Weight	DOB	From
G/F	24	Dillon Brooks	6 ft 6 in (1.98 m)	220 lb (100 kg)	1996–01–22	Oregon
G	8	MarShon Brooks	6 ft 5 in (1.96 m)	200 lb (91 kg)	1989–01–29	Providence
G	6	Mario Chalmers	6 ft 2 in (1.88 m)	190 lb (86 kg)	1986–05–19	Kansas
G	11	Mike Conley	6 ft 1 in (1.85 m)	175 lb (79 kg)	1987–10–11	Ohio State
F/C	21	Deyonta Davis	6 ft 11 in (2.11 m)	237 lb (108 kg)	1996–12–02	Michigan State
G/F	12	Tyreke Evans	6 ft 6 in (1.98 m)	220 lb (100 kg)	1989–09–19	Memphis
C	33	Marc Gasol	7 ft 1 in (2.16 m)	255 lb (116 kg)	1985–01–29	Lausanne CS (TN)
F	0	JaMychal Green	6 ft 9 in (2.06 m)	227 lb (103 kg)	1990–06–21	Alabama
G	5	Andrew Harrison	6 ft 6 in (1.98 m)	213 lb (97 kg)	1994–10–28	Kentucky
F	4	Myke Henry (TW)	6 ft 6 in (1.98 m)	210 lb (95 kg)	1992–12–23	DePaul
F	14	Omari Johnson	6 ft 9 in (2.06 m)	220 lb (100 kg)	1989–11–26	Oregon State
F	1	Jarell Martin	6 ft 10 in (2.08 m)	239 lb (108 kg)	1994–05–24	LSU
G	23	Ben McLemore	6 ft 5 in (1.96 m)	195 lb (88 kg)	1993–02–11	Kansas
F	25	Chandler Parsons	6 ft 10 in (2.08 m)	230 lb (104 kg)	1988–10–25	Florida
F	10	Ivan Rabb	6 ft 10 in (2.08 m)	220 lb (100 kg)	1997–02–04	California
G/F	7	Wayne Selden	6 ft 5 in (1.96 m)	230 lb (104 kg)	1994–09–30	Kansas
G	2	Kobi Simmons (TW)	6 ft 4 in (1.93 m)	170 lb (77 kg)	1997–07–04	Arizona

Coaches
Head coach
- J. B. Bickerstaff (interim)
Assistant(s)
- Bob Bender
- Adam Mazarei
- Keith Smart
- Nick Van Exel

Legend
- (DP) Unsigned draft pick
- (FA) Free agent
- (S) Suspended
- (GL) On assignment to G League affiliate
- (TW) Two-way affiliate player
- Injured

Roster
Updated: 2018–03–24

== Standings ==
=== Division ===
Southwest Division	W	L	PCT	GB	Home	Road	Div	GP
z – Houston Rockets	65	17	.793	–	34‍–‍7	31‍–‍10	12–4	82
x – New Orleans Pelicans	48	34	.585	17.0	24‍–‍17	24‍–‍17	9–7	82
x – San Antonio Spurs	47	35	.573	18.0	33‍–‍8	14‍–‍27	9–7	82
Dallas Mavericks	24	58	.293	41.0	15‍–‍26	9‍–‍32	5–11	82
Memphis Grizzlies	22	60	.268	43.0	16‍–‍25	6‍–‍35	5–11	82

=== Conference ===
Western Conference
#	Team	W	L	PCT	GB	GP
1	z – Houston Rockets *	65	17	.793	–	82
2	y – Golden State Warriors *	58	24	.707	7.0	82
3	y – Portland Trail Blazers *	49	33	.598	16.0	82
4	x – Oklahoma City Thunder	48	34	.585	17.0	82
5	x – Utah Jazz	48	34	.585	17.0	82
6	x – New Orleans Pelicans	48	34	.585	17.0	82
7	x – San Antonio Spurs	47	35	.573	18.0	82
8	x – Minnesota Timberwolves	47	35	.573	18.0	82
9	Denver Nuggets	46	36	.561	19.0	82
10	Los Angeles Clippers	42	40	.512	23.0	82
11	Los Angeles Lakers	35	47	.427	30.0	82
12	Sacramento Kings	27	55	.329	38.0	82
13	Dallas Mavericks	24	58	.293	41.0	82
14	Memphis Grizzlies	22	60	.268	43.0	82
15	Phoenix Suns	21	61	.256	44.0	82

== Game log ==
=== Preseason ===
2017 pre-season game log
Total: 3–2 (Home: 2–1; Road: 1–1)
Pre-season: 3–2 (home: 2–1; road: 1–1)

Game	Date	Team	Score	High points	High rebounds	High assists	Location Attendance	Record
1	October 2	Orlando	W 92–84	Jarell Martin (16)	Brandan Wright (8)	Chandler Parsons (3)	FedExForum; 12,986	1–0
2	October 4	@ Philadelphia	W 110–89	Brandan Wright (16)	Martin, Wright (8)	Andrew Harrison (5)	Wells Fargo Center; 18,102	2–0
3	October 9	@ Atlanta	L 88–100	James Ennis (14)	Marc Gasol (13)	Marc Gasol (4)	McCamish Pavilion; 7,262	2–1
4	October 11	Houston	L 89–101	Andrew Harrison (17)	Tyreke Evans (7)	Conley jr., Gasol (4)	FedExForum; 13,212	2–2
5	October 13	New Orleans	W 142–101	Jarell Martin (20)	Marc Gasol (10)	Marc Gasol (8)	FedExForum; N/A	3–2

2017–18 season schedule

=== Regular season ===
2017–18 game log
Total: 22–60 (Home: 16–25; Road: 6–35)
October: 5–2 (home: 4–1; road: 1–1)

Game	Date	Team	Score	High points	High rebounds	High assists	Location Attendance	Record
1	October 18	New Orleans	W 103–91	Mike Conley Jr. (27)	Marc Gasol (11)	Chalmers, Gasol (4)	FedExForum; 17,794	1–0
2	October 21	Golden State	W 111–101	Marc Gasol (34)	Marc Gasol (14)	Mike Conley Jr. (7)	FedExForum; 17,794	2–0
3	October 23	@ Houston	W 98–90	Marc Gasol (26)	James Ennis III (11)	Chalmers, Conley Jr. (4)	Toyota Center; 17,129	3–0
4	October 25	@ Dallas	L 94–103	Marc Gasol (26)	Marc Gasol (11)	Marc Gasol (4)	American Airlines Center; 19,674	3–1
5	October 26	Dallas	W 96–91	Marc Gasol (25)	Marc Gasol (13)	Mario Chalmers (6)	FedExForum; 15,839	4–1
6	October 28	Houston	W 103–89	Chandler Parsons (24)	Ennis III, Gasol (7)	Marc Gasol (7)	FedExForum; 17,033	5–1
7	October 30	Charlotte	L 99–104	Tyreke Evans (19)	Tyreke Evans (10)	Mike Conley Jr. (6)	FedExForum; 15,771	5–2

November : 2–11 (home: 0–6; road: 2–5)

Game	Date	Team	Score	High points	High rebounds	High assists	Location Attendance	Record
8	November 1	Orlando	L 99–101	Marc Gasol (22)	Marc Gasol (9)	Chandler Parsons (6)	FedExForum; 15,434	5–3
9	November 4	@ LA Clippers	W 113–104	Mike Conley Jr. (22)	Brandan Wright (9)	Chalmers, Evans (4)	Staples Center; 14,777	6–3
10	November 5	@ LA Lakers	L 102–107	Tyreke Evans (26)	Marc Gasol (10)	Marc Gasol (7)	Staples Center; 18,997	6–4
11	November 7	@ Portland	W 98–97	Tyreke Evans (21)	Brooks, Martin (8)	Mike Conley Jr. (6)	Moda Center; 18,692	7–4
12	November 11	@ Houston	L 96–111	Tyreke Evans (22)	Marc Gasol (9)	Tyreke Evans (6)	Toyota Center; 18,055	7–5
13	November 13	@ Milwaukee	L 103–110	Tyreke Evans (27)	Marc Gasol (9)	Marc Gasol (6)	BMO Harris Bradley Center; 13,244	7–6
14	November 15	Indiana	L 113–116	Marc Gasol (35)	Marc Gasol (13)	Tyreke Evans (9)	FedExForum; 16,033	7–7
15	November 18	Houston	L 83–105	Chandler Parsons (17)	Marc Gasol (9)	Mario Chalmers (8)	FedExForum; 17,266	7–8
16	November 20	Portland	L 92–100	Mario Chalmers (21)	Marc Gasol (12)	Marc Gasol (7)	FedExForum; 15,785	7–9
17	November 22	Dallas	L 94–95	Tyreke Evans (18)	Marc Gasol (10)	Tyreke Evans (7)	FedExForum; 16,101	7–10
18	November 24	@ Denver	L 92–104	JaMychal Green (21)	Marc Gasol (6)	Marc Gasol (14)	Pepsi Center; 16,736	7–11
19	November 26	Brooklyn	L 88–98	Evans, Gasol (18)	JaMychal Green (7)	Evans, McLemore (3)	FedExForum; 14,889	7–12
20	November 29	@ San Antonio	L 95–104	Tyreke Evans (22)	JaMychal Green (8)	Marc Gasol (7)	AT&T Center; 18,013	7–13

December : 5–12 (home: 3–5; road: 2–7)

Game	Date	Team	Score	High points	High rebounds	High assists	Location Attendance	Record
21	December 1	San Antonio	L 79–95	Marc Gasol (16)	Marc Gasol (13)	Evans, Gasol, Harrison (4)	FedExForum; 16,413	7–14
22	December 2	@ Cleveland	L 111–116	Tyreke Evans (31)	Green, Evans (7)	Tyreke Evans (12)	Quicken Loans Arena; 20,562	7–15
23	December 4	Minnesota	W 95–92	Marc Gasol (21)	JaMychal Green (9)	Tyreke Evans (9)	FedExForum; 14,012	8–15
24	December 6	@ New York	L 88–99	Marc Gasol (17)	Marc Gasol (8)	Andrew Harrison (5)	Madison Square Garden; 19,812	8–16
25	December 8	Toronto	L 107–116	Tyreke Evans (27)	Marc Gasol (7)	Andrew Harrison (7)	FedEx Forum; 15,417	8–17
26	December 9	Oklahoma City	L 101–102 (OT)	Tyreke Evans (29)	Tyreke Evans (13)	Marc Gasol (6)	FedEx Forum; 17,794	8–18
27	December 11	Miami	L 82–107	Marc Gasol (19)	Deyonta Davis (7)	Chandler Parsons (5)	FedEx Forum; 14,857	8–19
28	December 13	@ Washington	L 87–93	Andrew Harrison (20)	JaMychal Green (15)	Andrew Harrison (7)	Capital One Arena; 15,297	8–20
29	December 15	Atlanta	W 96–94	Tyreke Evans (22)	JaMychal Green (12)	Marc Gasol (5)	FedExForum; 15,803	9–20
30	December 16	Boston	L 93–102	Marc Gasol (30)	Marc Gasol (10)	Evans, Harrison (5)	FedExForum; 17,794	9–21
31	December 20	@ Golden State	L 84–97	Marc Gasol (21)	Marc Gasol (9)	Tyreke Evans (6)	Oracle Arena; 19,695	9–22
32	December 21	@ Phoenix	L 95–97	Tyreke Evans (23)	Marc Gasol (11)	Evans, Gasol (5)	Talking Stick Resort Arena; 16,339	9–23
33	December 23	LA Clippers	W 115–112	Tyreke Evans (30)	Marc Gasol (15)	Tyreke Evans (11)	FedExForum; 16,844	10–23
34	December 26	@ Phoenix	L 97–99	Tyreke Evans (25)	Gasol, Martin (6)	Tyreke Evans (5)	Talking Stick Resort Arena; 17,105	10–24
35	December 27	@ LA Lakers	W 109–99	Tyreke Evans (32)	Marc Gasol (9)	Tyreke Evans (7)	Staples Center; 18,997	11–24
36	December 30	@ Golden State	L 128–141	Marc Gasol (27)	JaMychal Green (8)	Tyreke Evans (9)	Oracle Arena; 19,596	11–25
37	December 31	@ Sacramento	W 114–96	Tyreke Evans (26)	Deyonta Davis (9)	Tyreke Evans (5)	Golden 1 Center; 17,583	12–25

January : 6–7 (home: 6–3; road: 0–4)

Game	Date	Team	Score	High points	High rebounds	High assists	Location Attendance	Record
38	January 2	@ LA Clippers	L 105–113	Tyreke Evans (18)	Jarell Martin (7)	Tyreke Evans (6)	Staples Center; 15,711	12–26
39	January 5	Washington	L 100–102	Tyreke Evans (26)	Marc Gasol (11)	Tyreke Evans (7)	FedExForum; 16,988	12–27
40	January 10	New Orleans	W 105–102	Tyreke Evans (28)	JaMychal Green (14)	Marc Gasol (7)	FedExForum; 14,312	13–27
41	January 12	@ Denver	L 78–87	Marc Gasol (22)	Marc Gasol (11)	Andrew Harrison (6)	Pepsi Center; 15,607	13–28
42	January 15	LA Lakers	W 123–114	Dillon Brooks (19)	Evans, Green (9)	Tyreke Evans (12)	FedExForum; 17,794	14–28
43	January 17	NY Knicks	W 105–99	Tyreke Evans (23)	JaMychal Green (13)	Tyreke Evans (10)	FedExForum; 12,885	15–28
44	January 19	Sacramento	W 106–88	Dillon Brooks (22)	JaMychal Green (10)	Tyreke Evans (5)	FedExForum; 16,831	16–28
45	January 20	@ New Orleans	L 104–111	Wayne Selden (27)	JaMychal Green (16)	Marc Gasol (7)	Smoothie King Center; 18,212	16–29
46	January 22	Philadelphia	W 105–101	Marc Gasol (19)	Jarell Martin (8)	Tyreke Evans (8)	FedExForum; 14,288	17–29
47	January 24	San Antonio	L 85–108	Marc Gasol (18)	Brooks, Gasol (7)	Andrew Harrison (6)	FedExForum; 15,812	17–30
48	January 26	LA Clippers	L 100–109	Chalmers, Martin (17)	Marc Gasol (12)	Chalmers, Gasol (10)	FedExForum; 16,369	17–31
49	January 29	Phoenix	W 120–109	Tyreke Evans (27)	Marc Gasol (10)	Brooks, Harrison (6)	FedExForum; 13,202	18–31
50	January 31	@ Indiana	L 101–105	Wayne Selden (24)	Marc Gasol (9)	Gasol, Harrison (6)	Bankers Life Fieldhouse; 15,093	18–32

February : 0–10 (home: 0–4; road: 0–6)

Game	Date	Team	Score	High points	High rebounds	High assists	Location Attendance	Record
51	February 1	@ Detroit	L 102–104	Marc Gasol (19)	Marc Gasol (14)	Andrew Harrison (8)	Little Caesars Arena; 17,481	18–33
52	February 4	@ Toronto	L 86–101	Marc Gasol (20)	Wayne Selden (7)	Marc Gasol (5)	Air Canada Centre; 19,800	18–34
53	February 6	@ Atlanta	L 82–108	Mario Chalmers (13)	Ivan Rabb (11)	Brooks, Harrison (8)	Philips Arena; 11,866	18–35
54	February 7	Utah	L 88–92	Andrew Harrison (23)	JaMychal Green (7)	Marc Gasol (5)	FedExForum; 13,187	18–36
55	February 11	@ Oklahoma City	L 92–110	Marc Gasol (18)	JaMychal Green (12)	Mario Chalmers (6)	Chesapeake Energy Arena; 18,203	18–37
56	February 14	Oklahoma City	L 114–121	Andrew Harrison (28)	Tyreke Evans (9)	Marc Gasol (9)	FedExForum; 16,012	18–38
57	February 23	Cleveland	L 89–112	Evans, Green (15)	JaMychal Green (10)	Tyreke Evans (10)	FedExForum; 18,119	18–39
58	February 24	@ Miami	L 89–115	Andrew Harrison (17)	JaMychal Green (11)	Andrew Harrison (6)	American Airlines Arena; 19,600	18–40
59	February 26	@ Boston	L 98–109	JaMychal Green (21)	JaMychal Green (11)	Marc Gasol (8)	TD Garden; 18,624	18–41
60	February 28	Phoenix	L 102–110	Marc Gasol (22)	Marc Gasol (13)	Andrew Harrison (7)	FedExForum; 13,484	18–42

March : 3–13 (home: 2–5; road: 1–8)

Game	Date	Team	Score	High points	High rebounds	High assists	Location Attendance	Record
61	March 2	Denver	L 102–108	Marc Gasol (22)	Marc Gasol (9)	Mario Chalmers (6)	FedExForum; 16,421	18–43
62	March 3	@ Orlando	L 100–107	Ben McLemore (20)	JaMychal Green (13)	JaMychal Green (7)	Amway Center; 17,875	18–44
63	March 5	@ San Antonio	L 98–100	Marc Gasol (23)	JaMychal Green (15)	Green, Rathan-Mayes (5)	AT&T Center; 18,418	18–45
64	March 7	@ Chicago	L 110–119	Dillon Brooks (29)	JaMychal Green (8)	Gasol, Rathan-Mayes (5)	United Center; 20,210	18–46
65	March 9	Utah	L 78–95	Dillon Brooks (18)	Marc Gasol (11)	Marc Gasol (6)	FedExForum; 15,622	18–47
66	March 10	@ Dallas	L 80–114	Dillon Brooks (17)	JaMychal Green (10)	Parsons, Simmons (4)	American Airlines Center; 19,579	18–48
67	March 12	Milwaukee	L 103–121	Marc Gasol (17)	Green, Gasol (7)	Martin, Simmons, Rathan-Mayes (5)	FedExForum; 14,112	18–49
68	March 15	Chicago	L 110–111	Tyreke Evans (25)	Green, Gasol (10)	Tyreke Evans (9)	FedExForum; 16,511	18–50
69	March 17	Denver	W 101–94	Dillon Brooks (24)	JaMychal Green (13)	Tyreke Evans (7)	FedExForum; 16,501	19–50
70	March 19	@ Brooklyn	L 115–118	Andrew Harrison (19)	JaMychal Green (16)	Andrew Harrison (8)	Barclays Center; 12,856	19–51
71	March 21	@ Philadelphia	L 105–119	Wayne Selden Jr. (18)	Deyonta Davis (11)	Mario Chalmers (5)	Wells Fargo Center; 10,411	19–52
72	March 22	@ Charlotte	L 79–140	Wayne Selden (18)	Jarell Martin (8)	Evans, Simmons (4)	Spectrum Center; 15,033	19–53
73	March 24	LA Lakers	L 93–100	Andrew Harrison (20)	JaMychal Green (16)	Andrew Harrison (9)	FedExForum; 18,119	19–54
74	March 26	@ Minnesota	W 101–93	Wayne Selden (23)	JaMychal Green (11)	Marc Gasol (6)	Target Center; 16,290	20–54
75	March 28	Portland	W 108–103	Dillon Brooks (21)	Jarell Martin (14)	Marc Gasol (6)	FedExForum; 16,050	21–54
76	March 30	@ Utah	L 97–107	Marc Gasol (28)	JaMychal Green (6)	Teague, Simmons (5)	Vivint Smart Home Arena; 18,306	21–55

April : 1–5 (home: 1–1; road: 0–4)

Game	Date	Team	Score	High points	High rebounds	High assists	Location Attendance	Record
77	April 1	@ Portland	L 98–113	Dillon Brooks (28)	Ivan Rabb (13)	Marquis Teague (5)	Moda Center; 19,545	21–56
78	April 4	@ New Orleans	L 95–123	MarShon Brooks (25)	Ivan Rabb (7)	MarShon Brooks (7)	Smoothie King Center; 16,521	21–57
79	April 6	Sacramento	L 93–94	MarShon Brooks (23)	Ivan Rabb (11)	MarShon Brooks (6)	FedExForum; 16,527	21–58
80	April 8	Detroit	W 130–117	MarShon Brooks (25)	Marc Gasol (9)	Marc Gasol (9)	FedExForum; 16,044	22–58
81	April 9	@ Minnesota	L 94–113	Ben McLemore (18)	Ivan Rabb (8)	MarShon Brooks (5)	Target Center; 17,641	22–59
82	April 11	@ Oklahoma City	L 123–137	Dillon Brooks (36)	Ivan Rabb (13)	Kobi Simmons (5)	Chesapeake Energy Arena; 18,203	22–60

2017–18 season schedule

== Player statistics ==
=== Regular season ===
Player	POS	GP	GS	MP	REB	AST	STL	BLK	PTS	MPG	RPG	APG	SPG	BPG	PPG
Dillon Brooks	SF	82	74	2,350	257	135	73	17	898	28.7	3.1	1.6	.9	.2	11.0
Marc Gasol	C	73	73	2,408	592	305	54	101	1,258	33.0	8.1	4.2	.7	1.4	17.2
Jarell Martin	PF	73	36	1,661	318	73	39	49	565	22.8	4.4	1.0	.5	.7	7.7
Mario Chalmers	PG	66	10	1,421	157	197	79	14	507	21.5	2.4	3.0	1.2	.2	7.7
Deyonta Davis	C	62	6	943	250	40	15	39	360	15.2	4.0	.6	.2	.6	5.8
Andrew Harrison	PG	56	46	1,326	131	177	38	26	533	23.7	2.3	3.2	.7	.5	9.5
Ben McLemore	SG	56	17	1,091	139	51	38	15	422	19.5	2.5	.9	.7	.3	7.5
JaMychal Green	PF	55	54	1,542	464	79	32	25	569	28.0	8.4	1.4	.6	.5	10.3
Tyreke Evans	PG	52	32	1,607	265	269	57	17	1,010	30.9	5.1	5.2	1.1	.3	19.4
James Ennis III^{†}	SF	45	14	1,053	157	49	32	12	310	23.4	3.5	1.1	.7	.3	6.9
Chandler Parsons	SF	36	8	691	90	69	18	11	284	19.2	2.5	1.9	.5	.3	7.9
Ivan Rabb	PF	36	5	516	158	32	12	13	201	14.3	4.4	.9	.3	.4	5.6
Wayne Selden Jr.	SG	35	9	692	56	66	18	5	325	19.8	1.6	1.9	.5	.1	9.3
Kobi Simmons	PG	32	12	643	50	68	18	5	196	20.1	1.6	2.1	.6	.2	6.1
Brandan Wright^{†}	PF	27	1	366	93	13	13	25	135	13.6	3.4	.5	.5	.9	5.0
Myke Henry	SF	20	0	378	38	22	31	6	107	18.9	1.9	1.1	1.6	.3	5.4
Mike Conley Jr.	PG	12	12	373	27	49	12	3	205	31.1	2.3	4.1	1.0	.3	17.1
Brice Johnson^{†}	PF	9	0	60	18	1	3	4	27	6.7	2.0	.1	.3	.4	3.0
MarShon Brooks	SG	7	1	193	21	25	11	3	141	27.6	3.0	3.6	1.6	.4	20.1
Brianté Weber^{†}	PG	5	0	119	17	9	8	2	24	23.8	3.4	1.8	1.6	.4	4.8
Xavier Rathan-Mayes	SG	5	0	118	5	18	6	3	29	23.6	1.0	3.6	1.2	.6	5.8
Omari Johnson	PF	4	0	75	11	7	2	0	22	18.8	2.8	1.8	.5	.0	5.5
Vince Hunter	PF	4	0	7	3	0	0	1	6	1.8	.8	.0	.0	.3	1.5
Marquis Teague	PG	3	0	74	6	13	4	0	11	24.7	2.0	4.3	1.3	.0	3.7

- ^{†} Denotes player spent time with another team in the season. Stats reflect time with the Grizzlies only.

== Transactions ==
=== Trades ===
June 22, 2017	To Memphis Grizzlies Draft right to Ivan Rabb (pick 35)	To Orlando Magic Future second-round pick
June 22, 2017	To Memphis Grizzlies Draft right to Dillon Brooks (pick 45)	To Houston Rockets Future second-round pick

=== Free agency ===
==== Re-signed ====
Player	Signed
Wayne Selden Jr.	July 1, 2017
JaMychal Green	September 27, 2017

==== Additions ====
Player	Signed	Former team
Kobi Simmons	July 1, 2017	Arizona Wildcats
Ben McLemore	July 7, 2017	Sacramento Kings
Tyreke Evans	July 10, 2017	Sacramento Kings
Rade Zagorac	July 17, 2017	(Serbia) Mega Leks
Mario Chalmers	July 19, 2017	Memphis Grizzlies (Previously a free agent.)
Vince Hunter	September 11, 2017	(Russia) Avtodor Saratov
Myke Henry	January 13, 2018	Oklahoma City Blue

==== Subtractions ====
Player	Reason left	New team
Tony Allen	1-year contract worth $2.3 million	New Orleans Pelicans
Vince Carter	1-year contract worth $8 million	Sacramento Kings
Zach Randolph	2-year contract worth $24 million	Sacramento Kings
Rade Zagorac	Waived as a training camp cut	(Spain) Real Betis Energía Plus
Wade Baldwin IV	Waived as a training camp cut	Portland Trail Blazers (Two-way contract)
Vince Hunter	Waived	(Greece) AEK B.C.
