= 2017–18 San Antonio Spurs season =

- Head coach: Gregg Popovich
- President: Gregg Popovich; Monty Williams (vice)
- General manager: R. C. Buford
- Owner: Peter Holt
- Arena: AT&T Center

Results
- Record: 47–35 (.573)
- Place: Division: 3rd (Southwest); Conference: 7th (Western)
- Playoff finish: First Round (lost to Warriors 1–4)
- Stats at Basketball Reference

Local media
- Television: Fox Sports Southwest; KENS HD; CW 35
- Radio: 1200 WOAI

The 2017–18 San Antonio Spurs season was the 51st season for the franchise, the team's 42nd season in the National Basketball Association (NBA), and its 45th in the San Antonio area. The Spurs finished the season with a 47–35 record and the seventh seed in the Western Conference. In the first round of the playoffs, the team was defeated in five games by the defending champion and eventual NBA champion Golden State Warriors, the team that swept them in the previous season's Western Conference finals. The 2017–18 season was the final season that Tony Parker and Manu Ginóbili played for the team, and Kawhi Leonard and Danny Green would be traded following the season to the Toronto Raptors.

== Season synopsis ==
Star forward Kawhi Leonard played in only nine games during the season due to a quadriceps injury. On March 10, 2018, the Spurs finished with a losing season on the road for the first time since 1997 after a loss to the Oklahoma City Thunder. However, the team finished the season with a winning record, doing so for an NBA-record 21st consecutive season. The Spurs clinched a playoff spot on April 9, 2018, with a win over the Sacramento Kings in their last home game of the season. They finished the regular season with a 47–35 record and held the seventh seed in the Western Conference.

In the first round of the playoffs, the Spurs faced the second-seeded Golden State Warriors and lost in five games.

== Draft ==
Round	Pick	Player	Position	Nationality	School / club team
1	29	Derrick White	PG	United States	Colorado
2	59	Jaron Blossomgame	SF	United States	Clemson

== Roster ==
2017–18 San Antonio Spurs roster
Players

Pos.	No.	Player	Height	Weight	DOB	From
F	12	LaMarcus Aldridge	6 ft 11 in (2.11 m)	260 lb (118 kg)	1985–07–19	Texas
F	1	Kyle Anderson	6 ft 9 in (2.06 m)	230 lb (104 kg)	1993–09–20	UCLA
F	42	Dāvis Bertāns	6 ft 10 in (2.08 m)	210 lb (95 kg)	1992–11–12	Latvia
C	10	Matt Costello (TW)	6 ft 10 in (2.08 m)	240 lb (109 kg)	1993–08–05	Michigan State
G	11	Bryn Forbes	6 ft 3 in (1.91 m)	190 lb (86 kg)	1993–07–23	Michigan State
C	16	Pau Gasol	7 ft 0 in (2.13 m)	250 lb (113 kg)	1980–07–06	Spain
F	22	Rudy Gay	6 ft 8 in (2.03 m)	230 lb (104 kg)	1986–08–17	Connecticut
G	20	Manu Ginóbili	6 ft 6 in (1.98 m)	205 lb (93 kg)	1977–07–28	Argentina
G/F	14	Danny Green	6 ft 6 in (1.98 m)	215 lb (98 kg)	1987–06–22	North Carolina
G/F	24	Darrun Hilliard (TW)	6 ft 6 in (1.98 m)	220 lb (100 kg)	1993–04–13	Villanova
C	77	Joffrey Lauvergne	7 ft 0 in (2.13 m)	260 lb (118 kg)	1991–09–30	INSEP
F	2	Kawhi Leonard	6 ft 7 in (2.01 m)	230 lb (104 kg)	1991–06–29	San Diego State
G	8	Patty Mills	6 ft 0 in (1.83 m)	185 lb (84 kg)	1988–08–11	Saint Mary's
G	5	Dejounte Murray	6 ft 5 in (1.96 m)	170 lb (77 kg)	1996–09–19	Washington
G	9	Tony Parker	6 ft 2 in (1.88 m)	185 lb (84 kg)	1982–05–17	INSEP
G	3	Brandon Paul	6 ft 4 in (1.93 m)	200 lb (91 kg)	1991–04–30	Illinois
G	4	Derrick White	6 ft 4 in (1.93 m)	190 lb (86 kg)	1994–07–02	Colorado

Coaches
Head coach
- Gregg Popovich
Assistant(s)
- James Borrego
- Chip Engelland
- Becky Hammon
- Will Hardy
- Ettore Messina
- Ime Udoka

Legend
- (DP) Unsigned draft pick
- (FA) Free agent
- (S) Suspended
- (GL) On assignment to G League affiliate
- (TW) Two-way affiliate player
- Injured

Roster
Updated: 2018–04–12

== Standings ==
=== Division ===
Southwest Division	W	L	PCT	GB	Home	Road	Div	GP
z – Houston Rockets	65	17	.793	–	34‍–‍7	31‍–‍10	12–4	82
x – New Orleans Pelicans	48	34	.585	17.0	24‍–‍17	24‍–‍17	9–7	82
x – San Antonio Spurs	47	35	.573	18.0	33‍–‍8	14‍–‍27	9–7	82
Dallas Mavericks	24	58	.293	41.0	15‍–‍26	9‍–‍32	5–11	82
Memphis Grizzlies	22	60	.268	43.0	16‍–‍25	6‍–‍35	5–11	82

=== Conference ===
Western Conference
#	Team	W	L	PCT	GB	GP
1	z – Houston Rockets *	65	17	.793	–	82
2	y – Golden State Warriors *	58	24	.707	7.0	82
3	y – Portland Trail Blazers *	49	33	.598	16.0	82
4	x – Oklahoma City Thunder	48	34	.585	17.0	82
5	x – Utah Jazz	48	34	.585	17.0	82
6	x – New Orleans Pelicans	48	34	.585	17.0	82
7	x – San Antonio Spurs	47	35	.573	18.0	82
8	x – Minnesota Timberwolves	47	35	.573	18.0	82
9	Denver Nuggets	46	36	.561	19.0	82
10	Los Angeles Clippers	42	40	.512	23.0	82
11	Los Angeles Lakers	35	47	.427	30.0	82
12	Sacramento Kings	27	55	.329	38.0	82
13	Dallas Mavericks	24	58	.293	41.0	82
14	Memphis Grizzlies	22	60	.268	43.0	82
15	Phoenix Suns	21	61	.256	44.0	82

== Game log ==
=== Preseason ===
2017 pre-season game log
Total: 3–2 (home: 2–1; road: 1–1)
Pre-season: 3–2 (home: 2–1; road: 1–1)

Game	Date	Team	Score	High points	High rebounds	High assists	Location Attendance	Record
1	October 2	@ Sacramento	L 100–106	LaMarcus Aldridge (17)	Davis Bertans (6)	Gasol, Ginobili, Mills (3)	Golden 1 Center; 16,000	0–1
2	October 6	Sacramento	W 113–93	Danny Green (20)	Joffrey Lauvergne (10)	Patty Mills (6)	AT&T Center; 18,082	1–1
3	October 8	Denver	W 122–100	LaMarcus Aldridge (21)	Matt Costello (12)	LaMarcus Aldridge (6)	AT&T Center; 17,832	2–1
4	October 10	Orlando	L 98–103	LaMarcus Aldridge (16)	Gasol, Gay, Lauvergne (7)	Dejounte Murray (5)	AT&T Center; 17,671	2–2
5	October 13	@ Houston	W 106–97	LaMarcus Aldridge (26)	LaMarcus Aldridge (10)	Danny Green (7)	Toyota Center; 17,445	3–2

2017–18 season schedule

=== Regular season ===
2017–18 game log
Total: 47–35 (home: 33–8; road: 14–27)
October: 4–3 (home: 2–0; road: 2–3)

Game	Date	Team	Score	High points	High rebounds	High assists	Location Attendance	Record
1	October 18	Minnesota	W 107–99	LaMarcus Aldridge (25)	LaMarcus Aldridge (10)	Aldridge, Gasol, Ginobili (4)	AT&T Center; 18,418	1–0
2	October 21	@ Chicago	W 87–77	LaMarcus Aldridge (28)	Aldridge, Murray (10)	Dejounte Murray (6)	United Center; 21,640	2–0
3	October 23	Toronto	W 101–97	LaMarcus Aldridge (20)	Dejounte Murray (14)	Dejounte Murray (6)	AT&T Center; 18,418	3–0
4	October 25	@ Miami	W 117–100	LaMarcus Aldridge (31)	Kyle Anderson (10)	Gay, Mills (4)	American Airlines Arena; 19,600	4–0
5	October 27	@ Orlando	L 87–114	LaMarcus Aldridge (24)	Aldridge, Gasol (11)	Anderson, Gay, Murray (10)	Amway Center; 17,337	4–1
6	October 29	@ Indiana	L 94–97	LaMarcus Aldridge (26)	Aldridge, Anderson (8)	Gasol, Ginobili (5)	Bankers Life Fieldhouse; 15,013	4–2
7	October 30	@ Boston	L 94–108	Brandon Paul (18)	Pau Gasol (8)	Gasol, Mills, Murray (4)	TD Garden; 18,624	4–3

November : 10–4 (home: 8–2; road: 2–2)

Game	Date	Team	Score	High points	High rebounds	High assists	Location Attendance	Record
8	November 2	Golden State	L 92–112	LaMarcus Aldridge (24)	LaMarcus Aldridge (10)	Anderson, Green (4)	AT&T Center; 18,418	4–4
9	November 3	Charlotte	W 108–101	Bryn Forbes (22)	Pau Gasol (10)	Pau Gasol (7)	AT&T Center; 18,418	5–4
10	November 5	Phoenix	W 112–95	LaMarcus Aldridge (21)	Aldridge, Gasol (9)	Patty Mills (4)	AT&T Center; 18,038	6–4
11	November 7	L.A. Clippers	W 120–107	LaMarcus Aldridge (25)	Pau Gasol (8)	Gasol, Mills (6)	AT&T Center; 18,418	7–4
12	November 10	Milwaukee	L 87–94	LaMarcus Aldridge (20)	LaMarcus Aldridge (12)	Pau Gasol (5)	AT&T Center; 18,418	7–5
13	November 11	Chicago	W 133–94	Pau Gasol (21)	Pau Gasol (10)	Patty Mills (6)	AT&T Center; 18,418	8–5
14	November 14	@ Dallas	W 97–91	LaMarcus Aldridge (25)	Pau Gasol (10)	Aldridge, Gasol (4)	American Airlines Center; 19,535	9–5
15	November 15	@ Minnesota	L 86–98	LaMarcus Aldridge (15)	LaMarcus Aldridge (10)	Patty Mills (5)	Target Center; 18,978	9–6
16	November 17	Oklahoma City	W 104–101	LaMarcus Aldridge (26)	LaMarcus Aldridge (9)	Kyle Anderson (6)	AT&T Center; 18,418	10–6
17	November 20	Atlanta	W 96–85	LaMarcus Aldridge (22)	LaMarcus Aldridge (11)	Kyle Anderson (10)	AT&T Center; 18,418	11–6
18	November 22	@ New Orleans	L 90–107	Rudy Gay (19)	Pau Gasol (9)	Anderson, Danny Green, Murray (4)	Smoothie King Center; 17,539	11–7
19	November 25	@ Charlotte	W 106–86	Aldridge, Gasol (17)	Aldridge, Gasol, Danny Green (7)	Aldridge, Gay (4)	Spectrum Center; 18,597	12–7
20	November 27	Dallas	W 115–108	LaMarcus Aldridge (33)	Aldridge, Gasol (10)	Anderson, Green, Mills (5)	AT&T Center; 17,918	13–7
21	November 29	Memphis	W 104–95	LaMarcus Aldridge (33)	Aldridge, Gasol (6)	Mills, Parker (5)	AT&T Center; 18,013	14–7

December : 11–5 (home: 7–0; road: 4–5)

Game	Date	Team	Score	High points	High rebounds	High assists	Location Attendance	Record
22	December 1	@ Memphis	W 95–79	LaMarcus Aldridge (22)	Pau Gasol (8)	Manu Ginobili (6)	FedExForum; 16,413	15–7
23	December 3	@ Oklahoma City	L 87–90	Dejounte Murray (17)	Dejounte Murray (11)	Dejounte Murray (5)	Chesapeake Energy Arena; 18,203	15–8
24	December 4	Detroit	W 96–93	LaMarcus Aldridge (17)	Aldridge, Gasol, Gay (10)	Aldridge, Gasol, Gay (4)	AT&T Center; 18,288	16–8
25	December 6	Miami	W 117–105	LaMarcus Aldridge (18)	Pau Gasol (7)	Tony Parker (9)	AT&T Center; 18,252	17–8
26	December 8	Boston	W 105–102	LaMarcus Aldridge (27)	Pau Gasol (11)	Mills, Parker (4)	AT&T Center; 18,418	18–8
27	December 9	@ Phoenix	W 104–101	Aldridge, Mills (20)	Dejounte Murray (14)	Dejounte Murray (4)	Talking Stick Resort Arena; 16,575	19–8
28	December 12	@ Dallas	L 89–95	LaMarcus Aldridge (23)	LaMarcus Aldridge (13)	Bryn Forbes (4)	American Airlines Center; 19,874	19–9
29	December 15	@ Houston	L 109–124	LaMarcus Aldridge (16)	Rudy Gay (8)	Dejounte Murray (5)	Toyota Center; 18,055	19–10
30	December 16	Dallas	W 98–96	LaMarcus Aldridge (22)	LaMarcus Aldridge (14)	Dejounte Murray (4)	AT&T Center; 18,418	20–10
31	December 18	L.A. Clippers	W 109–91	LaMarcus Aldridge (19)	Pau Gasol (12)	Tony Parker (7)	AT&T Center; 18,418	21–10
32	December 20	@ Portland	W 93–91	LaMarcus Aldridge (22)	Pau Gasol (17)	Pau Gasol (6)	Moda Center; 19,393	22–10
33	December 21	@ Utah	L 89–100	Bryn Forbes (12)	Dejounte Murray (8)	Tony Parker (6)	Vivint Smart Home Arena; 18,306	22–11
34	December 23	@ Sacramento	W 108–99	LaMarcus Aldridge (29)	Pau Gasol (11)	Pau Gasol (10)	Golden 1 Center; 17,583	23–11
35	December 26	Brooklyn	W 109–97	Kawhi Leonard (21)	Pau Gasol (12)	Pau Gasol (5)	AT&T Center; 18,492	24–11
36	December 28	New York	W 119–107	LaMarcus Aldridge (25)	Pau Gasol (11)	Pau Gasol (7)	AT&T Center; 18,935	25–11
37	December 30	@ Detroit	L 79–93	Kawhi Leonard (18)	LaMarcus Aldridge (11)	Patty Mills (4)	Little Caesars Arena; 19,671	25–12

January : 9–7 (home: 5–2; road: 4–5)

Game	Date	Team	Score	High points	High rebounds	High assists	Location Attendance	Record
38	January 2	@ New York	W 100–91	LaMarcus Aldridge (29)	Leonard, Murray, Gasol (8)	Kawhi Leonard (4)	Madison Square Garden; 19,812	26–12
39	January 3	@ Philadelphia	L 106–112	Patty Mills (26)	LaMarcus Aldridge (14)	Pau Gasol (4)	Wells Fargo Center; 20,642	26–13
40	January 5	Phoenix	W 103–89	Ginobili, Leonard (21)	Bertans, Gasol (7)	Tony Parker (7)	AT&T Center; 18,501	27–13
41	January 7	@ Portland	L 110–111	LaMarcus Aldridge (30)	LaMarcus Aldridge (14)	Anderson, Gasol (5)	Moda Center; 19,393	27–14
42	January 8	@ Sacramento	W 107–100	LaMarcus Aldridge (31)	LaMarcus Aldridge (12)	Dejounte Murray (6)	Golden 1 Center; 17,583	28–14
43	January 11	@ L.A. Lakers	L 81–93	LaMarcus Aldridge (20)	Pau Gasol (12)	Gasol, Murray (5)	Staples Center; 18,997	28–15
44	January 13	Denver	W 112–80	Kawhi Leonard (19)	Kawhi Leonard (8)	Tony Parker (5)	AT&T Center; 18,418	29–15
45	January 15	@ Atlanta	L 99–102	LaMarcus Aldridge (25)	LaMarcus Aldridge (11)	Gasol, Parker (4)	Philips Arena; 15,806	29–16
46	January 17	@ Brooklyn	W 100–95	LaMarcus Aldridge (34)	Pau Gasol (12)	Pau Gasol (7)	Barclays Center; 15,425	30–16
47	January 19	@ Toronto	L 83–86	LaMarcus Aldridge (17)	LaMarcus Aldridge (14)	Tony Parker (4)	Air Canada Centre; 19,800	30–17
48	January 21	Indiana	L 86–94	Pau Gasol (14)	LaMarcus Aldridge (10)	Tony Parker (5)	AT&T Center; 18,418	30–18
49	January 23	Cleveland	W 114–102	LaMarcus Aldridge (30)	Kyle Anderson (12)	Tony Parker (6)	AT&T Center; 18,418	31–18
50	January 24	@ Memphis	W 108–85	Patty Mills (15)	Pau Gasol (15)	Pau Gasol (9)	FedExForum; 15,812	32–18
51	January 26	Philadelphia	L 78–97	LaMarcus Aldridge (18)	Dejounte Murray (9)	Dejounte Murray (5)	AT&T Center; 18,418	32–19
52	January 28	Sacramento	W 113–98	Bryn Forbes (23)	Pau Gasol (11)	Dejounte Murray (6)	AT&T Center; 18,418	33–19
53	January 30	Denver	W 106–104	LaMarcus Aldridge (30)	Dejounte Murray (13)	Dejounte Murray (7)	AT&T Center; 18,418	34–19

February : 2–7 (home: 0–3; road: 2–4)

Game	Date	Team	Score	High points	High rebounds	High assists	Location Attendance	Record
54	February 1	Houston	L 91–102	Danny Green (22)	Dejounte Murray (11)	Aldridge, Ginobili, Green, Murray (22)	AT&T Center; 18,418	34–20
55	February 3	Utah	L 111–120	LaMarcus Aldridge (31)	Pau Gasol (11)	Tony Parker (9)	AT&T Center; 18,418	34–21
56	February 7	@ Phoenix	W 129–81	LaMarcus Aldridge (23)	LaMarcus Aldridge (13)	Aldridge, Anderson, Gasol (4)	Talking Stick Resort Arena; 15,993	35–21
57	February 10	@ Golden State	L 105–122	Aldridge, Anderson (20)	Derrick White (7)	Manu Ginobili (6)	Oracle Arena; 19,596	35–22
58	February 12	@ Utah	L 99–101	Kyle Anderson (16)	Pau Gasol (15)	Pau Gasol (6)	Vivint Smart Home Arena; 18,306	35–23
59	February 13	@ Denver	L 109–117	Joffrey Lauvergne (26)	Joffrey Lauvergne (12)	Tony Parker (4)	Pepsi Center; 17,623	35–24
All-Star Break
60	February 23	@ Denver	L 119–122	LaMarcus Aldridge (38)	Pau Gasol (12)	Mills, Murray, Parker (5)	Pepsi Center; 20,027	35–25
61	February 25	@ Cleveland	W 110–94	LaMarcus Aldridge (27)	Dejounte Murray (9)	Mills, Murray (5)	Quicken Loans Arena; 20,562	36–25
62	February 28	New Orleans	L 116–121	Rudy Gay (19)	Dejounte Murray (9)	Dejounte Murray (5)	AT&T Center; 18,418	36–26

March : 8–6 (home: 8–1; road: 0–5)

Game	Date	Team	Score	High points	High rebounds	High assists	Location Attendance	Record
63	March 3	L.A. Lakers	L 112–116	Pau Gasol (19)	Pau Gasol (10)	Pau Gasol (8)	AT&T Center; 18,557	36–27
64	March 5	Memphis	W 100–98	Tony Parker (23)	LaMarcus Aldridge (8)	Anderson, Gasol, Parker (5)	AT&T Center; 18,418	37–27
65	March 8	@ Golden State	L 107–110	LaMarcus Aldridge (30)	LaMarcus Aldridge (17)	Tony Parker (7)	Oracle Arena; 19,596	37–28
66	March 10	@ Oklahoma City	L 94–104	Bertans, Gay (14)	Aldridge, Gasol (7)	Manu Ginóbili (6)	Chesapeake Energy Arena; 18,203	37–29
67	March 12	@ Houston	L 93–109	Forbes, White (14)	Joffrey Lauvergne (6)	Murray, Forbes, Parker (3)	Toyota Center; 18,092	37–30
68	March 13	Orlando	W 108–72	Lamarcus Aldridge (24)	Dejounte Murray (8)	Tony Parker (8)	AT&T Center; 18,418	38–30
69	March 15	New Orleans	W 98–93	Lamarcus Aldridge (25)	Dejounte Murray (12)	Anderson, Parker (4)	AT&T Center; 18,418	39–30
70	March 17	Minnesota	W 117–101	Lamarcus Aldridge (39)	Lamarcus Aldridge (10)	Pau Gasol (8)	AT&T Center; 18,418	40–30
71	March 19	Golden State	W 89–75	Lamarcus Aldridge (33)	Lamarcus Aldridge (12)	Dejounte Murray (5)	AT&T Center; 18,418	41–30
72	March 21	Washington	W 98–90	Lamarcus Aldridge (27)	Dejounte Murray (10)	Aldridge, Anderson (4)	AT&T Center; 18,418	42–30
73	March 23	Utah	W 124–120 (OT)	Lamarcus Aldridge (45)	Lamarcus Aldridge (9)	Dejounte Murray (5)	AT&T Center; 18,418	43–30
74	March 25	@ Milwaukee	L 103–106	Lamarcus Aldridge (34)	Pau Gasol (13)	Ginobili, Murray (3)	Bradley Center; 18,717	43–31
75	March 27	@ Washington	L 106–116	Lamarcus Aldridge (13)	Pau Gasol (6)	Forbes, Mills (6)	Capital One Arena; 19,588	43–32
76	March 29	Oklahoma City	W 103–99	LaMarcus Aldridge (25)	Pau Gasol (12)	Dejounte Murray (7)	AT&T Center; 18,418	44–32

April : 3–3 (home: 3–0; road: 0–3)

Game	Date	Team	Score	High points	High rebounds	High assists	Location Attendance	Record
77	April 1	Houston	W 100–83	LaMarcus Aldridge (23)	LaMarcus Aldridge (14)	Kyle Anderson (5)	AT&T Center; 18,418	45–32
78	April 3	@ L.A. Clippers	L 110–113	Lamarcus Aldridge (35)	Lamarcus Aldridge (9)	Patty Mills (5)	Staples Center; 17,449	45–33
79	April 4	@ L.A. Lakers	L 112–122 (OT)	Lamarcus Aldridge (28)	Pau Gasol (12)	Dejounte Murray (6)	Staples Center; 18,997	45–34
80	April 7	Portland	W 116–105	Lamarcus Aldridge (28)	Lamarcus Aldridge (8)	Patty Mills (6)	AT&T Center; 18,610	46–34
81	April 9	Sacramento	W 98–85	Rudy Gay (18)	Lamarcus Aldridge (14)	Manu Ginobili (5)	AT&T Center; 18,418	47–34
82	April 11	@ New Orleans	L 98–122	Aldridge, Murray, Parker (11)	Gasol, Gay (7)	Gasol, Ginobili (4)	Smoothie King Center; 18,573	47–35

2017–18 season schedule

=== Playoffs ===
2018 playoff game log
Total: 1–4 (home: 1–1; road: 0–3)
First Round: 1–4 (home: 1–1; road: 0–3)

Game	Date	Team	Score	High points	High rebounds	High assists	Location Attendance	Series
1	April 14	@ Golden State	L 92–113	Rudy Gay (15)	Rudy Gay (6)	Pau Gasol (4)	Oracle Arena; 19,596	0–1
2	April 16	@ Golden State	L 101–116	LaMarcus Aldridge (34)	LaMarcus Aldridge (12)	Aldridge, Gay, Gasol, Ginobili, Mills (3)	Oracle Arena; 19,596	0–2
3	April 19	Golden State	L 97–110	LaMarcus Aldridge (18)	LaMarcus Aldridge (10)	Aldridge, Murray (4)	AT&T Center; 18,418	0–3
4	April 22	Golden State	W 103–90	LaMarcus Aldridge (22)	LaMarcus Aldridge (10)	Ginobili, Mills (5)	AT&T Center; 18,418	1–3
5	April 24	@ Golden State	L 91–99	LaMarcus Aldridge (30)	LaMarcus Aldridge (12)	Manu Ginobili (7)	Oracle Arena; 19,596	1–4

2018 playoff schedule

== Player statistics ==
Legend
GP	Games played	GS	Games started	MPG	Minutes per game
FG%	Field goal percentage	3P%	3-point field goal percentage	FT%	Free throw percentage
RPG	Rebounds per game	APG	Assists per game	SPG	Steals per game
BPG	Blocks per game	PPG	Points per game	**Bold**	Career high

=== Regular season ===
Player	GP	GS	MPG	FG%	3P%	FT%	RPG	APG	SPG	BPG	PPG
LaMarcus Aldridge	75	75	33.5	.510	.293	.837	8.5	2.0	.6	1.2	23.1
Kyle Anderson	74	67	26.7	.527	.333	.712	5.4	2.7	1.6	.8	7.9
Davis Bertans	77	10	14.1	.440	.373	.816	2.0	1.0	.3	.4	5.9
Matt Costello	4	0	8.0	.500	.	.	2.3	.5	.5	.5	1.0
Bryn Forbes	80	12	19.0	.421	.390	.667	1.4	1.0	.4	.0	6.9
Pau Gasol	77	63	23.5	.458	.358	.756	8.0	3.1	.3	1.0	10.1
Rudy Gay	57	6	21.6	.471	.314	.772	5.1	1.3	.8	.7	11.5
Manu Ginóbili	65	0	20.0	.434	.333	.840	2.2	2.5	.7	.2	8.9
Danny Green	70	60	25.6	.387	.363	.769	3.6	1.6	.9	1.1	8.6
Darrun Hilliard	14	0	6.8	.263	.000	.857	.5	.8	.1	.0	1.1
Joffrey Lauvergne	55	1	9.7	.516	.000	.638	3.1	.7	.2	.1	4.1
Kawhi Leonard	9	9	23.3	.468	.314	.816	4.7	2.3	2.0	1.0	16.2
Patty Mills	82	36	25.7	.411	.372	.890	1.9	2.8	.7	.1	10.0
Dejounte Murray	81	48	21.5	.443	.265	.709	5.7	2.9	1.2	.4	8.1
Tony Parker	55	21	19.5	.459	.270	.705	1.7	3.5	.5	.0	7.7
Brandon Paul	64	2	9.0	.433	.278	.512	1.1	.6	.4	.1	2.3
Derrick White	17	0	8.2	.485	.615	.700	1.5	.5	.2	.2	3.2

=== Playoffs ===
Player	GP	GS	MPG	FG%	3P%	FT%	RPG	APG	SPG	BPG	PPG
LaMarcus Aldridge	5	5	35.4	.463	.600	.976	9.3	2.4	.4	1.2	23.6
Kyle Anderson	5	1	14.6	.600	.000	.750	2.6	.6	1.2	.2	5.4
Davis Bertans	5	0	16.4	.167	.188	.727	2.2	1.2	.4	.0	3.4
Bryn Forbes	4	0	13.5	.294	.222	.714	.8	.5	.0	.0	4.3
Pau Gasol	5	0	18.0	.500	.333	.900	4.8	2.8	.0	.2	6.0
Rudy Gay	5	4	32.0	.400	.222	.556	5.6	2.2	1.6	.2	12.2
Manu Ginóbili	5	0	21.4	.405	.333	.818	3.0	3.2	1.4	.2	9.0
Danny Green	5	5	20.6	.267	.363	.	2.2	.2	.2	.8	4.2
Joffrey Lauvergne	1	0	6.0	1.000	.	.	1.0	.0	.0	.0	2.0
Patty Mills	5	5	33.0	.439	.371	.800	2.0	2.6	.6	.2	13.4
Dejounte Murray	5	5	19.2	.452	.667	.778	4.2	1.8	1.0	.4	7.8
Tony Parker	5	0	13.4	.378	.000	.714	.8	1.2	.4	.0	6.6
Brandon Paul	1	0	3.0	.	.	.	1.0	1.0	.0	.0	.0
Derrick White	3	0	6.0	.500	.500	.	.0	.3	.3	.7	2.3

== Transactions ==
=== Free agency ===
==== Re-signed ====
Player	Signed
Pau Gasol	3-year contract worth $48 million
Patty Mills	4-year contract worth $50 million
Manu Ginóbili	2-year contract worth $5 million

==== Additions ====
Player	Signed	Former team
Rudy Gay	2-year contract worth $17 million	Sacramento Kings
Brandon Paul	2-year contract worth $2.2 million	(Turkey) Anadolu Efes
Matt Costello	Two-way contract	Iowa Energy
Darrun Hilliard	Two-way contract	Detroit Pistons

==== Subtractions ====
Player	Reason left	New team
Jonathon Simmons	3-year contract worth $20 million	Orlando Magic
Dewayne Dedmon	2-year contract worth $14 million	Atlanta Hawks
Joel Anthony	Waived	(Argentina) San Lorenzo de Almagro

== Aftermath ==
After the end of the 2017–18 season, Leonard asked to be traded. On July 18, 2018, Leonard and Danny Green were traded to the Toronto Raptors, for DeMar DeRozan, Jakob Pöltl, and a first-round draft pick.

This season was the last season that franchise mainstays Tony Parker and Manu Ginóbili played for the Spurs. After 17 years with the team, Parker signed a two-year deal with the Charlotte Hornets and retired after one season. On August 27, 2018, Ginobili announced his retirement after 16 seasons, all with the Spurs. Ginobili was the second-oldest active player in the league at the time of his retirement, behind only the Atlanta Hawks' Vince Carter. This marked the official end of the Spurs' "Big Three" era; the trio of Parker, Ginobili, and Tim Duncan won a total of four NBA championships together during their years with the team.
