= 2017–18 Charlotte Hornets season =

NBA professional basketball team season

- Head coach: Steve Clifford
- General manager: Rich Cho; Buzz Peterson (interim); Mitch Kupchak
- Owners: Michael Jordan
- Arena: Spectrum Center

Results
- Record: 36–46 (.439)
- Place: Division: 3rd (Southeast); Conference: 10th (Eastern)
- Playoff finish: Did not qualify
- Stats at Basketball Reference

Local media
- Television: Fox Sports Carolinas, Fox Sports Southeast
- Radio: WFNZ

The 2017–18 Charlotte Hornets season was the 28th season of the franchise in the National Basketball Association (NBA) and the fifth season under head coach Steve Clifford. It was also the last season where Rich Cho was the general manager for the Hornets and the last where Clifford was the head coach (until his return in 2022), as well as Mitch Kupchak's first year with Charlotte.

On March 28, 2018, against the Cleveland Cavaliers, Kemba Walker surpassed Dell Curry to become the franchise's all-time leader in points. The Hornets equaled their record from last season and went on to miss playoff contention for the second straight season.

On April 8, 2018, Kupchak was hired as the president of basketball operations and general manager of the Charlotte Hornets.

On April 13, 2018, the Hornets' president of basketball operations and general manager Kupchak announced that the team had relieved Steve Clifford of his head coaching duties.

== NBA draft ==
Round	Pick	Player	Position	Nationality	School/club team
1	11	Malik Monk	SG	United States	Kentucky
2	40	Dwayne Bacon	SG	United States	Florida State

== Roster ==
2017–18 Charlotte Hornets roster
Players

Pos.	No.	Player	Height	Weight	DOB	From
F	7	Dwayne Bacon	6 ft 7 in (2.01 m)	221 lb (100 kg)	1995–08–30	Florida State
G/F	5	Nicolas Batum	6 ft 8 in (2.03 m)	200 lb (91 kg)	1988–12–14	France
G	10	Michael Carter-Williams	6 ft 6 in (1.98 m)	190 lb (86 kg)	1991–10–10	Syracuse
G/F	21	Treveon Graham	6 ft 5 in (1.96 m)	219 lb (99 kg)	1993–10–28	VCU
C	41	Willy Hernangómez	6 ft 11 in (2.11 m)	240 lb (109 kg)	1994–05–27	Spain
C	12	Dwight Howard	6 ft 11 in (2.11 m)	265 lb (120 kg)	1985–12–08	SW Atlanta Academy (GA)
F/C	44	Frank Kaminsky	7 ft 0 in (2.13 m)	242 lb (110 kg)	1993–04–04	Wisconsin
F	14	Michael Kidd-Gilchrist	6 ft 7 in (2.01 m)	232 lb (105 kg)	1993–09–26	Kentucky
G	3	Jeremy Lamb	6 ft 5 in (1.96 m)	185 lb (84 kg)	1992–05–30	Connecticut
F/C	9	Mangok Mathiang (TW)	6 ft 10 in (2.08 m)	230 lb (104 kg)	1992–10–08	Louisville
G	1	Malik Monk	6 ft 3 in (1.91 m)	200 lb (91 kg)	1998–02–04	Kentucky
G	4	Marcus Paige (TW)	6 ft 0 in (1.83 m)	164 lb (74 kg)	1993–09–11	North Carolina
G	32	Julyan Stone	6 ft 6 in (1.98 m)	200 lb (91 kg)	1988–12–07	UTEP
G	15	Kemba Walker	6 ft 1 in (1.85 m)	184 lb (83 kg)	1990–05–08	Connecticut
F	2	Marvin Williams	6 ft 9 in (2.06 m)	237 lb (108 kg)	1986–06–19	North Carolina
F/C	40	Cody Zeller	7 ft 0 in (2.13 m)	240 lb (109 kg)	1992–10–05	Indiana

Coaches
Head coach
- Steve Clifford
Assistant(s)
- Michael Batiste
- Pat Delany
- Steve Hetzel
- Eddie Jordan
- Bruce Kreutzer
- Stephen Silas (Associate HC)

Legend
- (DP) Unsigned draft pick
- (FA) Free agent
- (S) Suspended
- (GL) On assignment to G League affiliate
- (TW) Two-way affiliate player
- Injured

Roster
Updated: 2018–2–7

== Game log ==
=== Pre-season ===
2017 pre-season game log
Total: 2–3 (Home: 1–1; Road: 1–2)
Pre-season: 2–3 (home: 1–1; road: 1–2)

Game	Date	Team	Score	High points	High rebounds	High assists	Location Attendance	Record
1	October 2	@ Boston	L 82–94	Kemba Walker (12)	Dwight Howard (10)	Lamb, Walker (3)	TD Garden; 18,624	0–1
2	October 4	@ Detroit	W 108–106	Malik Monk (19)	Dwight Howard (11)	Julyan Stone (7)	Little Caesars Arena; 13,882	1–1
3	October 9	@ Miami	L 106–109	Malik Monk (19)	Cody Zeller (8)	Malik Monk (4)	American Airlines Arena; 19,600	1–2
4	October 11	Boston	L 100–108	Malik Monk (21)	Cody Zeller (9)	Kemba Walker (6)	Spectrum Center; N/A	1–3
5	October 13	Dallas	W 111–96	Kemba Walker (18)	Dwight Howard (12)	Bacon, Walker (4)	Spectrum Center; 10,018	2–3

2017–18 season schedule

=== Regular season ===
2017–18 game log
Total: 36–46 (Home: 21–20; Road: 15–26)
October: 4–3 (home: 3–1; road: 1–2)

Game	Date	Team	Score	High points	High rebounds	High assists	Location Attendance	Record
1	October 18	@ Detroit	L 90–102	Kemba Walker (24)	Dwight Howard (15)	Kemba Walker (4)	Little Caesars Arena; 20,491	0–1
2	October 20	Atlanta	W 109–91	Kemba Walker (26)	Dwight Howard (15)	Kemba Walker (9)	Spectrum Center; 18,417	1–1
3	October 23	@ Milwaukee	L 94–103	Frank Kaminsky (18)	Dwight Howard (22)	Kemba Walker (6)	Bradley Center; 12,887	1–2
4	October 25	Denver	W 110–93	Frank Kaminsky (20)	Dwight Howard (19)	Lamb, Walker (5)	Spectrum Center; 14,253	2–2
5	October 27	Houston	L 93–109	Kemba Walker (26)	Dwight Howard (16)	Kemba Walker (5)	Spectrum Center; 17,339	2–3
6	October 29	Orlando	W 120–113	Kemba Walker (34)	Marvin Williams (11)	Kemba Walker (10)	Spectrum Center; 15,531	3–3
7	October 30	@ Memphis	W 104–99	Kemba Walker (27)	Lamb, Williams, Zeller (8)	Kemba Walker (6)	FedExForum; 15,711	4–3

November : 4–9 (home: 4–2; road: 0–7)

Game	Date	Team	Score	High points	High rebounds	High assists	Location Attendance	Record
8	November 1	Milwaukee	W 126–121	Kemba Walker (26)	Dwight Howard (11)	Treveon Graham (5)	Spectrum Center; 15,655	5–3
9	November 3	@ San Antonio	L 101–108	Dwight Howard (20)	Dwight Howard (13)	Jeremy Lamb (6)	AT&T Center; 18,418	5–4
10	November 5	@ Minnesota	L 94–112	Cody Zeller (16)	Howard, Zeller (9)	Kemba Walker (9)	Target Center; 14,124	5–5
11	November 7	@ New York	L 113–118	Howard, Monk, Walker (21)	Dwight Howard (9)	Kemba Walker (7)	Madison Square Garden; 18,704	5–6
12	November 10	@ Boston	L 87–90	Kemba Walker (20)	Dwight Howard (11)	Kemba Walker (11)	TD Garden; 18,624	5–7
13	November 15	Cleveland	L 107–115	Michael Kidd-Gilchrist (22)	Kidd-Gilchrist, Kaminsky (6)	Kemba Walker (7)	Spectrum Center; 19,427	5–8
14	November 17	@ Chicago	L 120–123	Kemba Walker (47)	Dwight Howard (9)	Kemba Walker (5)	United Center; 20,493	5–9
15	November 18	L.A. Clippers	W 102–87	Kemba Walker (26)	Dwight Howard (16)	Nicolas Batum (7)	Spectrum Center; 17,640	6–9
16	November 20	Minnesota	W 118–102	Dwight Howard (25)	Dwight Howard (20)	Michael Carter-Williams (4)	Spectrum Center; 15,978	7–9
17	November 22	Washington	W 129–124 (OT)	Dwight Howard (26)	Dwight Howard (13)	Jeremy Lamb (5)	Spectrum Center; 16,041	8–9
18	November 24	@ Cleveland	L 99–100	Dwight Howard (20)	Dwight Howard (13)	Kemba Walker (8)	Quicken Loans Arena; 20,562	8–10
19	November 25	San Antonio	L 86–106	Kemba Walker (18)	Dwight Howard (11)	Kemba Walker (5)	Spectrum Center; 18,597	8–11
20	November 29	@ Toronto	L 113–126	Dwight Howard (22)	Dwight Howard (10)	Batum, Carter-Williams (5)	Air Canada Centre; 19,800	8–12

December : 5–11 (home: 3–7; road: 2–4)

Game	Date	Team	Score	High points	High rebounds	High assists	Location Attendance	Record
21	December 1	@ Miami	L 100–105	Marvin Williams (16)	Dwight Howard (9)	Michael Carter-Williams (6)	American Airlines Arena; 19,600	8–13
22	December 4	Orlando	W 104–94	Kemba Walker (29)	Nicolas Batum (11)	Nicolas Batum (7)	Spectrum Center; 14,419	9–13
23	December 6	Golden State	L 87–101	Kemba Walker (24)	Cody Zeller (8)	Kemba Walker (5)	Spectrum Center; 19,334	9–14
24	December 8	Chicago	L 111–119 (OT)	Dwight Howard (25)	Dwight Howard (20)	Nicolas Batum (10)	Spectrum Center; 14,077	9–15
25	December 9	L.A. Lakers	L 99–110	Kemba Walker (23)	Dwight Howard (12)	Kemba Walker (1)	Spectrum Center; 19,320	9–16
26	December 11	@ Oklahoma City	W 116–103	Dwight Howard (23)	Dwight Howard (7)	Kemba Walker (9)	Chesapeake Energy Arena; 18,203	10–16
27	December 13	@ Houston	L 96–108	Dwight Howard (26)	Dwight Howard (18)	Batum, Walker, Carter-Williams (3)	Toyota Center; 16,509	10–17
28	December 15	Miami	L 98–104	Kemba Walker (25)	Dwight Howard (16)	Nicolas Batum (10)	Spectrum Center; 15,565	10–18
29	December 16	Portland	L 91–93	Nicolas Batum (23)	Dwight Howard (15)	Kemba Walker (6)	Spectrum Center; 16,687	10–19
30	December 18	New York	W 109–91	Frank Kaminsky (24)	Michael Kidd-Gilchrist (9)	Kemba Walker (6)	Spectrum Center; 15,386	11–19
31	December 20	Toronto	L 111–129	Jeremy Lamb (32)	Dwight Howard (9)	Nicolas Batum (5)	Spectrum Center; 15,023	11–20
32	December 22	@ Milwaukee	L 104–109	Kemba Walker (32)	Marvin Williams (10)	Nicolas Batum (6)	Bradley Center; 17,018	11–21
33	December 23	Milwaukee	W 111–106	Dwight Howard (21)	Dwight Howard (16)	Kemba Walker (8)	Spectrum Center; 18,363	12–21
34	December 27	Boston	L 91–102	Kemba Walker (24)	Dwight Howard (17)	Kemba Walker (5)	Spectrum Center; 19,611	12–22
35	December 29	@ Golden State	W 111–100	Dwight Howard (29)	Dwight Howard (12)	Dwight Howard (7)	Oracle Arena; 19,596	13–22
36	December 31	@ L.A. Clippers	L 98–106	Kemba Walker (30)	Dwight Howard (10)	Nicolas Batum (6)	Staples Center; 17,348	13–23

January : 8–6 (home: 4–4; road: 4–2)

Game	Date	Team	Score	High points	High rebounds	High assists	Location Attendance	Record
37	January 2	@ Sacramento	W 131–111	Dwight Howard (20)	Dwight Howard (8)	Kemba Walker (10)	Golden 1 Center; 17,583	14–23
38	January 5	@ L.A. Lakers	W 108–94	Kemba Walker (19)	Dwight Howard (10)	Kemba Walker (7)	Staples Center; 18,997	15–23
39	January 10	Dallas	L 111–115	Kemba Walker (41)	Dwight Howard (12)	Kemba Walker (4)	Spectrum Center; 14,462	15–24
40	January 12	Utah	W 99–88	Kemba Walker (22)	Dwight Howard (13)	Kemba Walker (6)	Spectrum Center; 14,848	16–24
41	January 13	Oklahoma City	L 91–101	Kemba Walker (19)	Dwight Howard (17)	Marvin Williams (4)	Spectrum Center; 19,624	16–25
42	January 15	@ Detroit	W 118–107	Dwight Howard (21)	Dwight Howard (17)	Kemba Walker (9)	Little Caesars Arena; 17,200	17–25
43	January 17	Washington	W 133–109	Michael Kidd-Gilchrist (21)	Dwight Howard (15)	Kemba Walker (7)	Spectrum Center; 11,528	18–25
44	January 20	Miami	L 105–106	Nicolas Batum (26)	Dwight Howard (15)	Kemba Walker (7)	Spectrum Center; 18,687	18–26
45	January 22	Sacramento	W 112–107	Kemba Walker (26)	Dwight Howard (16)	Kemba Walker (9)	Spectrum Center; 11,806	19–26
46	January 24	New Orleans	L 96–101	Dwight Howard (22)	Dwight Howard (16)	Kemba Walker (7)	Spectrum Center; 14,588	19–27
47	January 26	Atlanta	W 121–110	Kemba Walker (29)	Dwight Howard (15)	Nicolas Batum (8)	Spectrum Center; 15,479	20–27
48	January 27	@ Miami	L 91–95	Kemba Walker (30)	Dwight Howard (16)	Kemba Walker (5)	American Airlines Arena; 19,600	20–28
49	January 29	@ Indiana	L 96–105	Kemba Walker (23)	Dwight Howard (11)	Kemba Walker (4)	Bankers Life Fieldhouse; 14,225	20–29
50	January 31	@ Atlanta	W 123–110	Kemba Walker (30)	Dwight Howard (16)	Nicolas Batum (10)	Philips Arena; 13,103	21–29

February : 7–5 (home: 4–1; road: 3–4)

Game	Date	Team	Score	High points	High rebounds	High assists	Location Attendance	Record
51	February 2	Indiana	W 133–126	Kemba Walker (41)	Dwight Howard (11)	Kemba Walker (9)	Spectrum Center; 17,135	22–29
52	February 4	@ Phoenix	W 115–110	Nicolas Batum (22)	Dwight Howard (14)	Batum, Walker (5)	Talking Stick Resort Arena; 14,487	23–29
53	February 5	@ Denver	L 104–121	Kemba Walker (20)	Cody Zeller (10)	Nicolas Batum (5)	Pepsi Center; 14,410	23–30
54	February 8	@ Portland	L 103–109 (OT)	Kemba Walker (40)	Dwight Howard (15)	Nicolas Batum (5)	Moda Center; 19,178	23–31
55	February 9	@ Utah	L 94–106	Kemba Walker (19)	Dwight Howard (9)	Kemba Walker (5)	Vivint Smart Home Arena; 18,306	23–32
56	February 11	Toronto	L 103–123	Kemba Walker (23)	Dwight Howard (13)	Kemba Walker (9)	Spectrum Center; 18,320	23–33
57	February 14	@ Orlando	W 104–102	Dwight Howard (22)	Dwight Howard (13)	Nicolas Batum (7)	Amway Center; 18,428	24–33
58	February 22	Brooklyn	W 111–96	Kemba Walker (31)	Dwight Howard (24)	Batum, Walker (7)	Spectrum Center; 14,112	25–33
59	February 23	@ Washington	W 122–105	Frank Kaminsky (25)	Kemba Walker (7)	Nicolas Batum (8)	Capital One Arena; 17,824	26–33
60	February 25	Detroit	W 114–98	Howard, Walker (17)	Dwight Howard (12)	Nicolas Batum (9)	Spectrum Center; 17,894	27–33
61	February 27	Chicago	W 118–103	Kemba Walker (31)	Nicolas Batum (7)	Nicolas Batum (12)	Spectrum Center; 14,521	28–33
62	February 28	@ Boston	L 106–134	Kemba Walker (23)	Marvin Williams (9)	Nicolas Batum (10)	TD Garden; 18,624	28–34

March : 6–9 (home: 3–3; road: 3–6)

Game	Date	Team	Score	High points	High rebounds	High assists	Location Attendance	Record
63	March 2	@ Philadelphia	L 99–110	Kemba Walker (31)	Nicolas Batum (13)	Nicolas Batum (8)	Wells Fargo Center; 20,487	28–35
64	March 4	@ Toronto	L 98–103	Kemba Walker (27)	Dwight Howard (10)	Nicolas Batum (8)	Air Canada Centre; 19,800	28–36
65	March 6	Philadelphia	L 114–128	Dwight Howard (30)	Dwight Howard (6)	Nicolas Batum (10)	Spectrum Center; 15,600	28–37
66	March 8	Brooklyn	L 111–125	Kemba Walker (21)	Dwight Howard (7)	Kemba Walker (6)	Spectrum Center; 14,173	28–38
67	March 10	Phoenix	W 122–115	Dwight Howard (30)	Batum, Howard (12)	Batum, Walker (7)	Spectrum Center; 19,336	29–38
68	March 13	@ New Orleans	L 115–119	Howard, Walker (22)	Dwight Howard (11)	Nicolas Batum (8)	Smoothie King Center; 15,507	29–39
69	March 15	@ Atlanta	W 129–117	Dwight Howard (33)	Dwight Howard (12)	Nicolas Batum (16)	Philips Arena; 14,486	30–39
70	March 17	@ New York	L 101–124	Dwayne Bacon (15)	Dwight Howard (13)	Dwayne Bacon (3)	Madison Square Garden; 17,760	30–40
71	March 19	@ Philadelphia	L 94–108	Kemba Walker (24)	Batum, Walker (8)	Kemba Walker (6)	Wells Fargo Center; 20,530	30–41
72	March 21	@ Brooklyn	W 111–105	Dwight Howard (32)	Dwight Howard (30)	Kemba Walker (6)	Barclays Center; 10,231	31–41
73	March 22	Memphis	W 140–79	Kemba Walker (46)	Willy Hernangómez (12)	Jeremy Lamb (6)	Spectrum Center; 15,033	32–41
74	March 24	@ Dallas	W 102–98	Kemba Walker (24)	Dwight Howard (22)	Frank Kaminsky (6)	American Airlines Center; 20,085	33–41
75	March 26	New York	W 137–128 (OT)	Kemba Walker (31)	Dwight Howard (13)	Kemba Walker (7)	Spectrum Center; 14,487	34–41
76	March 28	Cleveland	L 105–118	Kemba Walker (21)	Dwight Howard (10)	Nicolas Batum (5)	Spectrum Center; 19,474	34–42
77	March 31	@ Washington	L 93–107	Dwight Howard (22)	Dwight Howard (13)	Nicolas Batum (7)	Capital One Arena; 19,071	34–43

April : 2–3 (home: 0–2; road: 2–1)

Game	Date	Team	Score	High points	High rebounds	High assists	Location Attendance	Record
78	April 1	Philadelphia	L 102–119	Kidd-Gilchrist, Monk (16)	Willy Hernangomez (11)	Kemba Walker (4)	Spectrum Center; 17,005	34–44
79	April 3	@ Chicago	L 114–120	Dwight Howard (23)	Dwight Howard (17)	Nicolas Batum (5)	United Center; 20,139	34–45
80	April 6	@ Orlando	W 137–100	Malik Monk (26)	Dwight Howard (17)	Malik Monk (8)	Amway Center; 17,018	35–45
81	April 8	Indiana	L 117–123	Malik Monk (22)	Dwight Howard (12)	Frank Kaminsky (6)	Spectrum Center; 16,629	35–46
82	April 10	@ Indiana	W 119–93	Frank Kaminsky (24)	Dwight Howard (17)	Batum, Stone (6)	Bankers Life Fieldhouse; 17,331	36–46

2017–18 season schedule

== Standings ==
Southeast Division	W	L	PCT	GB	Home	Road	Div	GP
y – Miami Heat	44	38	.537	–	26‍–‍15	18‍–‍23	11–5	82
x – Washington Wizards	43	39	.524	1.0	23‍–‍18	20‍–‍21	8–8	82
Charlotte Hornets	36	46	.439	8.0	21‍–‍20	15‍–‍26	11–5	82
Orlando Magic	25	57	.305	19.0	17‍–‍24	8‍–‍33	5–11	82
Atlanta Hawks	24	58	.293	20.0	16‍–‍25	8‍–‍33	5–11	82

Eastern Conference
#	Team	W	L	PCT	GB	GP
1	c – Toronto Raptors *	59	23	.720	–	82
2	x – Boston Celtics	55	27	.671	4.0	82
3	x – Philadelphia 76ers	52	30	.634	7.0	82
4	y – Cleveland Cavaliers *	50	32	.610	9.0	82
5	x – Indiana Pacers	48	34	.585	11.0	82
6	y – Miami Heat *	44	38	.537	15.0	82
7	x – Milwaukee Bucks	44	38	.537	15.0	82
8	x – Washington Wizards	43	39	.524	16.0	82
9	Detroit Pistons	39	43	.476	20.0	82
10	Charlotte Hornets	36	46	.439	23.0	82
11	New York Knicks	29	53	.354	30.0	82
12	Brooklyn Nets	28	54	.341	31.0	82
13	Chicago Bulls	27	55	.329	32.0	82
14	Orlando Magic	25	57	.305	34.0	82
15	Atlanta Hawks	24	58	.293	35.0	82

== Player statistics ==
=== Ragular season ===
Player	POS	GP	GS	MP	REB	AST	STL	BLK	PTS	MPG	RPG	APG	SPG	BPG	PPG
Dwight Howard	C	81	81	2,463	1,012	105	48	131	1,347	30.4	12.5	1.3	.6	1.6	16.6
Kemba Walker	PG	80	80	2,736	248	444	91	24	1,770	34.2	3.1	5.6	1.1	.3	22.1
Jeremy Lamb	SG	80	18	1,967	324	186	61	32	1,033	24.6	4.1	2.3	.8	.4	12.9
Frank Kaminsky	PF	79	4	1,835	288	129	36	19	873	23.2	3.6	1.6	.5	.2	11.1
Marvin Williams	PF	78	78	2,006	370	96	56	38	744	25.7	4.7	1.2	.7	.5	9.5
Michael Kidd-Gilchrist	SF	74	74	1,850	302	71	51	32	681	25.0	4.1	1.0	.7	.4	9.2
Nicolas Batum	SG	64	64	1,981	306	349	65	23	740	31.0	4.8	5.5	1.0	.4	11.6
Treveon Graham	SG	63	2	1,050	121	59	33	2	273	16.7	1.9	.9	.5	.0	4.3
Malik Monk	SG	63	0	854	66	91	20	9	421	13.6	1.0	1.4	.3	.1	6.7
Dwayne Bacon	SG	53	6	713	124	38	16	2	175	13.5	2.3	.7	.3	.0	3.3
Michael Carter-Williams	PG	52	2	835	138	116	44	23	239	16.1	2.7	2.2	.8	.4	4.6
Johnny O'Bryant III	PF	36	0	379	93	14	9	6	171	10.5	2.6	.4	.3	.2	4.8
Cody Zeller	C	33	0	627	177	31	14	21	233	19.0	5.4	.9	.4	.6	7.1
Julyan Stone	SG	23	0	175	29	26	4	2	19	7.6	1.3	1.1	.2	.1	.8
Willy Hernangómez^{†}	C	22	1	262	116	12	10	9	135	11.9	5.3	.5	.5	.4	6.1
Marcus Paige	PG	5	0	28	4	3	0	0	12	5.6	.8	.6	.0	.0	2.4
Mangok Mathiang	C	4	0	20	10	0	1	0	8	5.0	2.5	.0	.3	.0	2.0

- ^{†} Denotes player spent time with another team in the season. Stats reflect time with the Hornets only.

== Transactions ==
=== Trades ===
June 20, 2017	To Charlotte Hornets Dwight Howard; 31st pick in the 2017 NBA draft	To Atlanta Hawks Miles Plumlee; Marco Belinelli; 41st pick in the 2017 NBA draft
June 22, 2017	To Charlotte Hornets Draft rights to Dwayne Bacon (pick 40); Cash considerations	To New Orleans Pelicans Draft rights to Frank Jackson (pick 31)
February 7, 2018	To Charlotte Hornets Willy Hernangómez	To New York Knicks Johnny O'Bryant III; 2020 second-round pick 2021 second-round pick

=== Free agents ===
==== Re-signed ====
Player	Signed

==== Additions ====
Player	Signed	Former team
Michael Carter-Williams	July 7, 2017	Chicago Bulls
Mangok Mathiang	August 2, 2017	Louisville Cardinals
Marcus Paige	August 2, 2017	Salt Lake City Stars
Julyan Stone	August 23, 2017	(Italy) Umana Reyer Venezia

==== Subtractions ====
Player	Reason left	New team
Miles Plumlee	Traded	Atlanta Hawks
Marco Belinelli	Traded	Atlanta Hawks
Ramon Sessions	Unrestricted free agent	New York Knicks
Brian Roberts	Unrestricted free agent	(Greece) Olympiacos Piraeus
Brianté Weber	Waived	Los Angeles Lakers
Christian Wood	Unrestricted free agent	(China) Fujian SBS Sturgeons / Delaware 87ers
