= 2017–18 Los Angeles Clippers season =

NBA professional basketball team season

- Head coach: Doc Rivers
- General manager: Michael Winger
- Owners: Steve Ballmer
- Arena: Staples Center

Results
- Record: 42–40 (.512)
- Place: Division: 2nd (Pacific); Conference: 10th (Western)
- Playoff finish: Did not qualify
- Stats at Basketball Reference

Local media
- Television: KCOP-TV; Fox Sports West and Prime Ticket
- Radio: KLAC

The 2017–18 Los Angeles Clippers season was the 48th season of the franchise in the National Basketball Association (NBA), their 40th season in Southern California, and their 34th season in Los Angeles. Two-time Executive Of The Year winner Jerry West would join the Clippers as a special consultant.

For the first time since 2011, Chris Paul was not on the roster as he was traded to the Houston Rockets in the off-season in exchange for Patrick Beverley, Lou Williams, Sam Dekker, Montrezl Harrell, Darrun Hilliard, DeAndre Liggins, Kyle Wiltjer, a first-round pick next year, and cash. Head coach Doc Rivers would also relinquish his role as a President of Basketball Operations for the team on August 4, with the role being replaced by Lawrence Frank.

On January 28, 2018, the Clippers traded their franchise cornerstone and 2009 1st overall pick Blake Griffin to the Detroit Pistons alongside Brice Johnson and Willie Reed for Tobias Harris, Avery Bradley, Boban Marjanović, and two draft picks, effectively ending the Lob City era.

On April 1, 2018, the Clippers streak of 50 or more wins since the 2012-13 season came to an end with a loss to the Indiana Pacers.

With a loss to the Denver Nuggets on April 7, 2018, the Clippers were eliminated from playoff contention for the first time since the 2010–11 season.

Following this season, Austin Rivers was traded to the Washington Wizards in exchange for Marcin Gortat.

This was also DeAndre Jordan's last season as a Clipper. After 10 years of being on the team, on July 6, 2018, DeAndre signed a one-year deal with the Dallas Mavericks.

== Draft ==
The Clippers did not have a pick in the 2017 NBA Draft, but acquired both the Philadelphia 76ers' 39th pick, Jawun Evans out of Oklahoma State, and Milwaukee Bucks' 48th pick, Sindarius Thornwell out of South Carolina, for cash considerations.

== Roster ==
2017–18 Los Angeles Clippers roster
Players

Pos.	No.	Player	Height	Weight	DOB	From
G	21	Patrick Beverley (injured)	6 ft 1 in (1.85 m)	185 lb (84 kg)	1988–07–12	Arkansas
G	11	Avery Bradley	6 ft 2 in (1.88 m)	180 lb (82 kg)	1990–11–26	Texas
F	7	Sam Dekker	6 ft 9 in (2.06 m)	230 lb (104 kg)	1994–05–06	Wisconsin
G	1	Jawun Evans	6 ft 0 in (1.83 m)	190 lb (86 kg)	1996–07–26	Oklahoma State
F	8	Danilo Gallinari	6 ft 10 in (2.08 m)	225 lb (102 kg)	1988–08–08	Italy
F/C	5	Montrezl Harrell	6 ft 8 in (2.03 m)	240 lb (109 kg)	1994–01–26	Louisville
F	34	Tobias Harris	6 ft 9 in (2.06 m)	235 lb (107 kg)	1992–07–15	Tennessee
F	33	Wesley Johnson	6 ft 7 in (2.01 m)	215 lb (98 kg)	1987–07–11	Syracuse
C	6	DeAndre Jordan	6 ft 11 in (2.11 m)	265 lb (120 kg)	1988–07–21	Texas A&M
C	51	Boban Marjanović	7 ft 3 in (2.21 m)	290 lb (132 kg)	1988–08–15	Serbia
G	25	Austin Rivers	6 ft 4 in (1.93 m)	200 lb (91 kg)	1992–08–01	Duke
G	4	Miloš Teodosić	6 ft 5 in (1.96 m)	196 lb (89 kg)	1987–03–19	Serbia
G	0	Sindarius Thornwell	6 ft 5 in (1.96 m)	215 lb (98 kg)	1994–11–15	South Carolina
G	12	Tyrone Wallace (TW)	6 ft 5 in (1.96 m)	198 lb (90 kg)	1994–06–10	California
G	9	C. J. Williams	6 ft 5 in (1.96 m)	230 lb (104 kg)	1990–02–06	NC State
G	23	Lou Williams	6 ft 1 in (1.85 m)	175 lb (79 kg)	1986–10–27	South Gwinnett HS (GA)

Coaches
Head coach
- Doc Rivers
Assistant(s)
- Sam Cassell
- Armond Hill
- Brendan O'Connor
- Pat Sullivan
- John Welch
- Mike Woodson
- J. P. Clark (player development)

Legend
- (DP) Unsigned draft pick
- (FA) Free agent
- (S) Suspended
- (GL) On assignment to G League affiliate
- (TW) Two-way affiliate player
- Injured

Roster
Updated: 2018–04–09

=== Roster notes ===
- Guard Lou Williams becomes the 27th former Laker to play for the crosstown rival Clippers.

== Standings ==
=== Division ===
Pacific Division	W	L	PCT	GB	Home	Road	Div	GP
y – Golden State Warriors	58	24	.707	–	29‍–‍12	29‍–‍12	13–3	82
Los Angeles Clippers	42	40	.512	16.0	22‍–‍19	20‍–‍21	12–4	82
Los Angeles Lakers	35	47	.427	23.0	20‍–‍21	15‍–‍26	6–10	82
Sacramento Kings	27	55	.329	31.0	14‍–‍27	13‍–‍28	5–11	82
Phoenix Suns	21	61	.256	37.0	10‍–‍31	11‍–‍30	4–12	82

=== By Conference ===
Western Conference
#	Team	W	L	PCT	GB	GP
1	z – Houston Rockets *	65	17	.793	–	82
2	y – Golden State Warriors *	58	24	.707	7.0	82
3	y – Portland Trail Blazers *	49	33	.598	16.0	82
4	x – Oklahoma City Thunder	48	34	.585	17.0	82
5	x – Utah Jazz	48	34	.585	17.0	82
6	x – New Orleans Pelicans	48	34	.585	17.0	82
7	x – San Antonio Spurs	47	35	.573	18.0	82
8	x – Minnesota Timberwolves	47	35	.573	18.0	82
9	Denver Nuggets	46	36	.561	19.0	82
10	Los Angeles Clippers	42	40	.512	23.0	82
11	Los Angeles Lakers	35	47	.427	30.0	82
12	Sacramento Kings	27	55	.329	38.0	82
13	Dallas Mavericks	24	58	.293	41.0	82
14	Memphis Grizzlies	22	60	.268	43.0	82
15	Phoenix Suns	21	61	.256	44.0	82

== Game log ==
=== Preseason ===
2017 pre-season game log
Total: 2–3 (Home: 2–2; Road: 0–1)
Pre-season: 2–3 (home: 2–2; road: 0–1)

Game	Date	Team	Score	High points	High rebounds	High assists	Location Attendance	Record
1	October 1	@ Toronto	L 113–121	Blake Griffin (18)	DeAndre Jordan (9)	Miloš Teodosić (8)	Stan Sheriff Center; 8,018	0–1
2	October 4	Toronto	W 98–84	Blake Griffin (17)	DeAndre Jordan (8)	Miloš Teodosić (5)	Stan Sheriff Center; 8,272	1–1
3	October 8	Portland	L 106–134	Griffin, Teodosić (15)	DeAndre Jordan (14)	Beverley, Griffin (6)	Staples Center; 13,278	1–2
4	October 12	Sacramento	W 104–87	Blake Griffin (18)	DeAndre Jordan (14)	Miloš Teodosić (6)	Staples Center; 11,225	2–2
5	October 13	L.A. Lakers	L 104–111	Tyrone Wallace (23)	Brice Johnson (10)	Jawun Evans (8)	Staples Center; 16,711	2–3

2017–18 season schedule

=== Regular season ===
2017–18 game log
Total: 42–40 (Home: 22–19; Road: 20–21)
October: 4–2 (home: 2–2; road: 2–0)

Game	Date	Team	Score	High points	High rebounds	High assists	Location Attendance	Record
1	October 19	@ LA Lakers	W 108–92	Blake Griffin (29)	DeAndre Jordan (24)	Miloš Teodosić (6)	Staples Center; 18,997	1–0
2	October 21	Phoenix	W 130–88	Blake Griffin (29)	DeAndre Jordan (13)	Lou Williams (6)	Staples Center; 19,068	2–0
3	October 24	Utah	W 102–84	Blake Griffin (22)	DeAndre Jordan (18)	Blake Griffin (6)	Staples Center; 16,607	3–0
4	October 26	@ Portland	W 104–103	Blake Griffin (25)	DeAndre Jordan (18)	Blake Griffin (5)	Moda Center; 18,694	4–0
5	October 28	Detroit	L 87–95	Austin Rivers (20)	DeAndre Jordan (18)	Patrick Beverley (8)	Staples Center; 17,247	4–1
6	October 30	Golden State	L 113–141	Danilo Gallinari (19)	DeAndre Jordan (11)	Beverley, Gallinari, Griffin (4)	Staples Center; 19,068	4–2

November : 4–10 (home: 2–4; road: 2–6)

Game	Date	Team	Score	High points	High rebounds	High assists	Location Attendance	Record
7	November 1	Dallas	W 119–98	Blake Griffin (20)	DeAndre Jordan (9)	Blake Griffin (7)	Staples Center; 13,487	5–2
8	November 4	Memphis	L 104–113	Blake Griffin (30)	Blake Griffin (11)	Danilo Gallinari (6)	Staples Center; 14,777	5–3
9	November 5	Miami	L 101–104	Blake Griffin (23)	DeAndre Jordan (19)	Blake Griffin (4)	Staples Center; 15,676	5–4
10	November 7	@ San Antonio	L 107–120	Austin Rivers (24)	Blake Griffin (9)	Blake Griffin (6)	AT&T Center; 18,418	5–5
11	November 10	@ Oklahoma City	L 111–120	Lou Williams (35)	DeAndre Jordan (12)	Blake Griffin (5)	Chesapeake Energy Arena; 18,203	5–6
12	November 11	@ New Orleans	L 103–111	Blake Griffin (26)	DeAndre Jordan (14)	Blake Griffin (6)	Smoothie King Center; 17,624	5–7
13	November 13	Philadelphia	L 105–109	Blake Griffin (26)	Lou Williams (7)	Lou Williams (6)	Staples Center; 19,068	5–8
14	November 17	@ Cleveland	L 113–118 (OT)	Blake Griffin (23)	DeAndre Jordan (22)	Austin Rivers (6)	Quicken Loans Arena; 20,562	5–9
15	November 18	@ Charlotte	L 87–102	Lou Williams (25)	DeAndre Jordan (14)	Griffin, Williams (4)	Spectrum Center; 17,640	5–10
16	November 20	@ New York	L 85–107	Blake Griffin (21)	DeAndre Jordan (9)	Griffin, Rivers (5)	Madison Square Garden; 18,848	5–11
17	November 22	@ Atlanta	W 116–103	Blake Griffin (26)	DeAndre Jordan (16)	Blake Griffin (10)	Philips Arena; 12,675	6–11
18	November 25	@ Sacramento	W 97–95	Blake Griffin (33)	DeAndre Jordan (16)	Lou Williams (8)	Golden 1 Center; 17,583	7–11
19	November 27	LA Lakers	W 120–115	Lou Williams (42)	Blake Griffin (11)	Griffin, Rivers (6)	Staples Center; 18,086	8–11
20	November 30	Utah	L 107–126	Austin Rivers (25)	DeAndre Jordan (16)	Austin Rivers (6)	Staples Center; 15,139	8–12

December : 8–7 (home: 5–1; road: 3–6)

Game	Date	Team	Score	High points	High rebounds	High assists	Location Attendance	Record
21	December 2	@ Dallas	L 82–108	Lou Williams (18)	DeAndre Jordan (18)	Lou Williams (6)	American Airlines Center; 19,245	8–13
22	December 3	@ Minnesota	L 106–112	Austin Rivers (30)	DeAndre Jordan (12)	Lou Williams (10)	Target Center; 13,172	8–14
23	December 6	Minnesota	L 107–113	Rivers, Williams (26)	DeAndre Jordan (21)	Lou Williams (8)	Staples Center; 15,951	8–15
24	December 9	Washington	W 113–112	Lou Williams (35)	DeAndre Jordan (17)	Lou Williams (8)	Staples Center; 15,739	9–15
25	December 11	Toronto	W 96–91	Harrell, Williams (17)	DeAndre Jordan (17)	Lou Williams (5)	Staples Center; 16,658	10–15
26	December 13	@ Orlando	W 106–95	Lou Williams (31)	DeAndre Jordan (20)	Lou Williams (8)	Amway Center; 16,011	11–15
27	December 15	@ Washington	L 91–100	Lou Williams (23)	DeAndre Jordan (16)	Jawun Evans (6)	Capital One Arena; 15,442	11–16
28	December 16	@ Miami	L 85–90	Montrezl Harrell (15)	DeAndre Jordan (20)	Lou Williams (7)	American Airlines Arena; 19,600	11–17
29	December 18	@ San Antonio	L 91–109	Wilson, Jordan (13)	DeAndre Jordan (14)	Milos Teodosic (5)	AT&T Center; 18,418	11–18
30	December 20	Phoenix	W 108–95	Austin Rivers (21)	DeAndre Jordan (20)	Milos Teodosic (8)	Staples Center; 18,995	12–18
31	December 22	@ Houston	W 128–118	Austin Rivers (36)	DeAndre Jordan (20)	Rivers, Williams (7)	Toyota Center; 17,373	13–18
32	December 23	@ Memphis	L 112–115	Austin Rivers (38)	DeAndre Jordan (18)	Milos Teodosic (4)	FedExForum; 16,844	13–19
33	December 26	Sacramento	W 122–95	Montrezl Harrell (22)	DeAndre Jordan (15)	Miloš Teodosić (10)	Staples Center; 19,099	14–19
34	December 29	@ L.A. Lakers	W 121–106	Blake Griffin (24)	DeAndre Jordan (16)	Miloš Teodosić (7)	Staples Center; 18,997	15–19
35	December 31	Charlotte	W 106–98	Lou Williams (40)	DeAndre Jordan (16)	Lou Williams (8)	Staples Center; 19,099	16–19

January : 9–6 (home: 5–5; road: 4–1)

Game	Date	Team	Score	High points	High rebounds	High assists	Location Attendance	Record
36	January 2	Memphis	W 113–105	Lou Williams (33)	DeAndre Jordan (9)	Blake Griffin (8)	Staples Center; 15,711	17–19
37	January 4	Oklahoma City	L 117–127	Jordan, Williams (26)	DeAndre Jordan (17)	Lou Williams (10)	Staples Center; 19,068	17–20
38	January 6	Golden State	L 105–121	Lou Williams (23)	DeAndre Jordan (11)	Jawun Evans (7)	Staples Center; 19,068	17–21
39	January 8	Atlanta	W 108–107	Lou Williams (34)	DeAndre Jordan (18)	Evans, Williams (4)	Staples Center; 14,624	18–21
40	January 10	@ Golden State	W 125–106	Lou Williams (50)	DeAndre Jordan (12)	Lou Williams (7)	Oracle Arena; 19,596	19–21
41	January 11	@ Sacramento	W 121–115	Lou Williams (30)	Blake Griffin (12)	Milos Teodosic (9)	Golden 1 Center; 17,583	20–21
42	January 13	Sacramento	W 126–105	Lou Williams (26)	Willie Reed (13)	Blake Griffin (9)	Staples Center; 16,656	21–21
43	January 15	Houston	W 113–102	Lou Williams (26)	Wesley Johnson (12)	Lou Williams (9)	Staples Center; 17,622	22–21
44	January 17	Denver	W 109–104	Blake Griffin (20)	Blake Griffin (12)	Teodosic, Williams (5)	Staples Center; 15,043	23–21
45	January 20	@ Utah	L 113–125	Lou Williams (31)	Griffin, Johnson (8)	Lou Williams (7)	Vivint Smart Home Arena; 18,306	23–22
46	January 22	Minnesota	L 118–126	Blake Griffin (32)	Blake Griffin (12)	Blake Griffin (12)	Staples Center; 16,347	23–23
47	January 24	Boston	L 102–113	Blake Griffin (23)	DeAndre Jordan (14)	Lou Williams (7)	Staples Center; 19,430	23–24
48	January 26	@ Memphis	W 109–100	Lou Williams (40)	DeAndre Jordan (9)	Lou Williams (10)	FedExForum; 16,369	24–24
49	January 28	@ New Orleans	W 112–103	Blake Griffin (27)	DeAndre Jordan (19)	Blake Griffin (7)	Smoothie King Center; 16,378	25–24
50	January 30	Portland	L 96–104	Lou Williams (20)	DeAndre Jordan (19)	Lou Williams (5)	Staples Center; 16,705	25–25

February : 7–3 (home: 2–1; road: 5–2)

Game	Date	Team	Score	High points	High rebounds	High assists	Location Attendance	Record
51	February 3	Chicago	W 113–103	Gallinari, Harris (24)	DeAndre Jordan (16)	Lou Williams (6)	Staples Center; 19,068	26–25
52	February 5	Dallas	W 104–101	Danilo Gallinari (28)	DeAndre Jordan (13)	Lou Williams (8)	Staples Center; 15,127	27–25
53	February 9	@ Detroit	W 108–95	Lou Williams (26)	DeAndre Jordan (17)	Lou Williams (6)	Little Caesars Arena; 16,697	28–25
54	February 10	@ Philadelphia	L 98–112	Lou Williams (23)	DeAndre Jordan (21)	Lou Williams (6)	Wells Fargo Center; 20,504	28–26
55	February 12	@ Brooklyn	W 114–101	Lou Williams (20)	DeAndre Jordan (17)	Rivers, Williams (4)	Barclays Center; 13,735	29–26
56	February 14	@ Boston	W 129–119	DeAndre Jordan (30)	DeAndre Jordan (13)	Lou Williams (6)	TD Garden; 18,624	30–26
57	February 22	@ Golden State	L 127–134	Tobias Harris (22)	DeAndre Jordan (14)	Lou Williams (12)	Oracle Arena; 19,596	30–27
58	February 23	@ Phoenix	W 128–117	Lou Williams (35)	DeAndre Jordan (13)	Austin Rivers (6)	Talking Stick Resort Arena; 17,126	31–27
59	February 27	@ Denver	W 122–120	Lou Williams (25)	DeAndre Jordan (9)	Lou Williams (6)	Pepsi Center; 15,004	32–27
60	February 28	Houston	L 92–105	Tobias Harris (24)	DeAndre Jordan (16)	Rivers, Teodosic (4)	Staples Center; 19,068	32–28

March : 9–7 (home: 5–2; road: 4–5)

Game	Date	Team	Score	High points	High rebounds	High assists	Location Attendance	Record
61	March 2	NY Knicks	W 128–105	Lou Williams (19)	DeAndre Jordan (20)	Lou Williams (8)	Staples Center; 17,190	33–28
62	March 4	Brooklyn	W 123–120	Austin Rivers (27)	DeAndre Jordan (15)	Teodosic, L. Williams (4)	Staples Center; 16,384	34–28
63	March 6	New Orleans	L 116–121	Tobias Harris (27)	DeAndre Jordan (20)	Lou Williams (11)	Staples Center; 16,412	34–29
64	March 9	Cleveland	W 116–102	Tobias Harris (23)	DeAndre Jordan (23)	Lou Williams (7)	Staples Center; 19,130	35–29
65	March 10	Orlando	W 113–105	Lou Williams (25)	DeAndre Jordan (18)	Milos Teodosic (7)	Staples Center; 16,561	36–29
66	March 13	@ Chicago	W 112–106	DeAndre Jordan (29)	DeAndre Jordan (18)	Austin Rivers (6)	United Center; 20,912	37–29
67	March 15	@ Houston	L 96–101	Tobias Harris (29)	DeAndre Jordan (18)	Milos Teodosic (4)	Toyota Center; 18,055	37–30
68	March 16	@ Oklahoma City	L 113–121	Tobias Harris (24)	DeAndre Jordan (21)	Tobias Harris (6)	Chesapeake Energy Arena; 18,203	37–31
69	March 18	Portland	L 109–122	Montrezl Harrell (24)	DeAndre Jordan (16)	Lou Williams (4)	Staples Center; 17,776	37–32
70	March 20	@ Minnesota	L 109–123	DeAndre Jordan (18)	DeAndre Jordan (12)	Lou Williams (5)	Target Center; 16,351	37–33
71	March 21	@ Milwaukee	W 127–120	DeAndre Jordan (25)	DeAndre Jordan (22)	Lou Williams (8)	Bradley Center; 17,916	38–33
72	March 23	@ Indiana	L 104–109	Lou Williams (27)	DeAndre Jordan (11)	Lou Williams (10)	Bankers Life Fieldhouse; 17,923	38–34
73	March 25	@ Toronto	W 117–106	Lou Williams (26)	DeAndre Jordan (14)	Lou Williams (7)	Air Canada Centre; 19,800	39–34
74	March 27	Milwaukee	W 105–98	Tobias Harris (19)	DeAndre Jordan (16)	Tobias Harris (5)	Staples Center; 19,068	40–34
75	March 28	@ Phoenix	W 111–99	Tobias Harris (27)	DeAndre Jordan (15)	Austin Rivers (8)	Talking Stick Resort Arena; 17,005	41–34
76	March 30	@ Portland	L 96–107	Lou Williams (23)	DeAndre Jordan (14)	Lou Williams (3)	Moda Center; 20,013	41–35

April : 1–5 (home: 1–4; road: 0–1)

Game	Date	Team	Score	High points	High rebounds	High assists	Location Attendance	Record
77	April 1	Indiana	L 104–111	Tobias Harris (21)	DeAndre Jordan (12)	Harris, Rivers (7)	Staples Center; 15,866	41–36
78	April 3	San Antonio	W 113–110	Tobias Harris (29)	DeAndre Jordan (17)	Austin Rivers (5)	Staples Center; 17,449	42–36
79	April 5	@ Utah	L 95–117	Austin Rivers (19)	DeAndre Jordan (9)	Rivers, Williams, L. Williams (7)	Vivint Smart Home Arena; 18,306	42–37
80	April 7	Denver	L 115–134	Lou Williams (24)	DeAndre Jordan (17)	Austin Rivers (9)	Staples Center; 16,166	42–38
81	April 9	New Orleans	L 100–113	Sindarius Thornwell (20)	DeAndre Jordan (12)	Sindarius Thornwell (7)	Staples Center; 15,742	42–39
82	April 11	LA Lakers	L 100–115	Tobias Harris (23)	DeAndre Jordan (9)	Austin Rivers (6)	Staples Center; 19,068	42–40

2017–18 season schedule

== Player statistics ==
Legend
GP	Games played	GS	Games started	MPG	Minutes per game
FG%	Field-goal percentage	3P%	3-point field-goal percentage	FT%	Free-throw percentage
RPG	Rebounds per game	APG	Assists per game	SPG	Steals per game
BPG	Blocks per game	PPG	Points per game

=== Regular season ===
Bold – Leaders (Qualified)
* – Recorded statistics when playing for Los Angeles

Player	GP	GS	MPG	FG%	3P%	FT%	RPG	APG	SPG	BPG	PPG
Patrick Beverley	11	11	30.4	.403	.400	.824	4.1	2.9	**1.7**	.5	12.2
Avery Bradley	6	6	27.5	.473	.111	**1.000**	3.7	1.8	.8	.2	9.2
Sam Dekker	73	1	12.1	.494	.167	.661	2.4	.5	.3	.1	4.2
Jawun Evans	48	4	16.2	.352	.278	.776	1.8	2.1	.8	.1	4.8
Danilo Gallinari	21	21	32.0	.398	.324	.931	4.8	2.0	.6	.5	15.3
Montrezl Harrell	76	3	17.0	.635	.143	.626	4.0	1.0	.5	.7	11.0
Tobias Harris	32	32	**34.5**	.473	**.414**	.800	6.0	3.1	1.2	.6	19.3
Wesley Johnson	74	40	20.1	.408	.339	.741	2.9	.8	1.0	.8	5.4
DeAndre Jordan	77	**77**	31.5	**.645**	.000	.580	**15.2**	1.5	.5	**.9**	12.0
Boban Marjanović	20	0	8.3	.551	.000	.788	4.4	.4	.3	.3	5.9
Austin Rivers	61	59	33.7	.424	.378	.642	2.4	4.0	1.2	.3	15.1
Miloš Teodosić	45	36	25.2	.419	.379	.848	2.8	4.6	.5	.1	9.5
Sindarius Thornwell	73	17	15.8	.429	.377	.670	1.9	.9	.7	.3	3.9
Tyrone Wallace	30	19	28.4	.445	.250	.782	3.5	2.4	.9	.4	9.7
C. J. Williams	38	17	18.6	.442	.282	.813	1.5	1.1	.8	.3	5.5
Lou Williams	**79**	19	32.8	.435	.359	.880	2.5	**5.3**	1.1	.2	**22.6**

== Transactions ==
=== Trades ===
June 22, 2017	To Los Angeles Clippers Draft rights to Sindarius Thornwell	To Milwaukee Bucks Cash considerations
June 28, 2017	To Los Angeles Clippers Patrick Beverley; Lou Williams; Sam Dekker; Montrezl Harrell; Darrun Hilliard; DeAndre Liggins; Kyle Wiltjer; 2018 first-round pick Cash considerations	To Houston Rockets Chris Paul
July 6, 2017	To Los Angeles Clippers Draft rights to Jawun Evans	To Philadelphia 76ers Cash considerations
July 6, 2017	To Los Angeles Clippers Danilo Gallinari (from Denver)	To Denver Nuggets 2019 second-round pick (from Atlanta)
July 6, 2017	To Atlanta Hawks Jamal Crawford (from Los Angeles); Diamond Stone (from Los Angeles); 2018 first-round pick (from Los Angeles)
September 25, 2017	To Los Angeles Clippers Draft considerations	To Atlanta Hawks DeAndre Liggins
January 29, 2018	To Los Angeles Clippers Tobias Harris; Avery Bradley; Boban Marjanović; 2018 protected 1st-round pick 2019 2nd-round pick	To Detroit Pistons Blake Griffin; Brice Johnson; Willie Reed

=== Free agency ===
==== Re-signed ====
Player	Signed
Blake Griffin	5-year contract worth $173 million

==== Additions ====
Player	Signed	Former team
Miloš Teodosić	2-year contract worth $12.3 million	(Russia) CSKA Moscow
Willie Reed	1-year contract worth $1.5 million	Miami Heat
Jamil Wilson	Two-way contract	(Italy) Auxilium Pallacanestro Torino
C. J. Williams	Two-way contract	Texas Legends
Tyrone Wallace	Two-way contract	Agua Caliente Clippers
Sean Kilpatrick	10-day contract, March 4, 2018; 2nd 10-day contract, March 14, 2018	Milwaukee Bucks

==== Subtractions ====
Player	Reason left	New team
Paul Pierce	Waived, June 28, 2017	Boston Celtics (Retired)
JJ Redick	Free agency, July 8, 2017	Philadelphia 76ers
Raymond Felton	Free agency, July 10, 2017	Oklahoma City Thunder
Luc Mbah a Moute	Free agency, July 19, 2017	Houston Rockets
Marreese Speights	Free agency, July 27, 2017	Orlando Magic
Brandon Bass	Free agency, August 17, 2017	(China) Liaoning Flying Leopards
Jamil Wilson	Waived, January 5, 2018	Fort Wayne Mad Ants
Alan Anderson	Free agency, February 10, 2018	Lakeland Magic
Sean Kilpatrick	Contract expired, March 24, 2018	Chicago Bulls
