= 2017–18 Brooklyn Nets season =

Season of National Basketball Association team the Brooklyn Nets

- Head coach: Kenny Atkinson
- General manager: Sean Marks
- Owners: Mikhail Prokhorov
- Arena: Barclays Center

Results
- Record: 28–54 (.341)
- Place: Division: 5th (Atlantic); Conference: 12th (Eastern)
- Playoff finish: Did not qualify
- Stats at Basketball Reference

Local media
- Television: YES Network, WPIX
- Radio: WFAN AM/FM

The 2017–18 Brooklyn Nets season was the 42nd season of the franchise in the National Basketball Association (NBA), 51st season overall, and its sixth season playing in the New York City borough of Brooklyn. This was the last time that the Nets missed the playoffs until 2024.

== Draft picks ==
2017 NBA draft picks
Round	Pick	Player	Position	Nationality	School/club
1	22	Jarrett Allen	Center	United States	Texas
1	27	Kyle Kuzma	Power forward	United States	Utah
2	57	Aleksandar Vezenkov	Power Forward	Bulgaria	FC Barcelona Lassa

The Nets would enter the draft holding two first-round picks and one second-round pick. The highest first-round pick would be from the Washington Wizards, who acquired the pick alongside Andrew Nicholson and bringing back Marcus Thornton in exchange for Bojan Bogdanović and Chris McCullough. As for both their other first-round pick (which was Pick #27) and the sole second-round pick they have, those would be had from their most infamous trade with the Boston Celtics for both Kevin Garnett and Paul Pierce, while swapping first-round picks this year (which was the #1 pick originally). With their original second-round pick, they lost that pick to the Atlanta Hawks in order for them to acquire Joe Johnson.

On June 20, two days before the 2017 NBA draft began, Brooklyn would trade their 27th pick from Boston (which became power forward Kyle Kuzma from Utah University) alongside star center Brook Lopez to the Los Angeles Lakers for point guard D'Angelo Russell and champion center Timofey Mozgov.

On draft night, the Nets selected freshman center Jarrett Allen from University of Texas with the first-round pick they acquired from Washington. Under his sole season there, Allen recorded averages of 13.4 points and 8.4 rebounds per game while making it to the All-Big 12 Third Team as a member of the Longhorns.

They also selected the Bulgarian/Cypriot/Greek tri-citizen power forward Aleksandar Vezenkov, who previously last played in the FC Barcelona Lassa out in the Liga ACB in Spain. As a player who previously played for both the Barcelona Lassa and Aris Thessaloniki under the Greek Basket League, Vezenkov earned numerous honors out in both Greece and Spain, including being the Greek League's MVP back in 2015 and winning the Spanish Supercup the same year.

== Roster ==
2017–18 Brooklyn Nets roster
Players

Pos.	No.	Player	Height	Weight	DOB	From
PF	13	Quincy Acy	6 ft 7 in (2.01 m)	240 lb (109 kg)	1990-10-06	Baylor
C	31	Jarrett Allen	6 ft 11 in (2.11 m)	243 lb (110 kg)	1998-04-21	Texas
PF	9	DeMarre Carroll	6 ft 6 in (1.98 m)	215 lb (98 kg)	1986-07-27	Vanderbilt, Missouri
SG	33	Allen Crabbe	6 ft 5 in (1.96 m)	212 lb (96 kg)	1992-04-09	California
SF	44	Dante Cunningham	6 ft 8 in (2.03 m)	230 lb (104 kg)	1987-04-22	Villanova
PG	8	Spencer Dinwiddie	6 ft 5 in (1.96 m)	215 lb (98 kg)	1993-04-06	Colorado
SG	14	Milton Doyle (TW)	6 ft 4 in (1.93 m)	185 lb (84 kg)	1993-10-31	Loyola (IL) Chicago
SG	12	Joe Harris	6 ft 6 in (1.98 m)	220 lb (100 kg)	1991-09-06	Virginia
SF	24	Rondae Hollis-Jefferson	6 ft 6 in (1.98 m)	217 lb (98 kg)	1995-01-03	Arizona
SF	22	Caris LeVert	6 ft 6 in (1.98 m)	205 lb (93 kg)	1994-08-25	Michigan
PG	7	Jeremy Lin (injured)	6 ft 3 in (1.91 m)	200 lb (91 kg)	1988-08-23	Harvard
C	20	Timofey Mozgov	7 ft 1 in (2.16 m)	275 lb (125 kg)	1986-07-16	Russia
C	4	Jahlil Okafor	6 ft 10 in (2.08 m)	270 lb (122 kg)	1995-12-15	Duke
PG	1	D'Angelo Russell	6 ft 4 in (1.93 m)	193 lb (88 kg)	1996-02-23	Ohio State
SG	2	Nik Stauskas	6 ft 6 in (1.98 m)	205 lb (93 kg)	1993-10-07	Michigan
SF	0	James Webb III (TW)	6 ft 9 in (2.06 m)	202 lb (92 kg)	1993-08-19	Boise State
PG	15	Isaiah Whitehead (injured)	6 ft 4 in (1.93 m)	213 lb (97 kg)	1995-03-08	Seton Hall

Coaches
Head coach
- Kenny Atkinson
Assistant(s)
- Bret Brielmaier
- Chris Fleming
- Jacque Vaughn
- Travon Bryant (assistant coach/player development)
- Adam Harrington (assistant coach/player development)
- Jordan Ott (advanced scout)
- Lloyd Beckett (Trainer)
- Dan Meehan (strength and conditioning)

Legend
- (DP) Unsigned draft pick
- (FA) Free agent
- (S) Suspended
- (GL) On assignment to G League affiliate
- (TW) Two-way affiliate player
- Injured

Roster
Updated: October 14, 2017

== Game log ==
=== Preseason ===
2017 pre-season game log
Total: 3–1 (Home: 2–1; Road: 1–0)
Pre-season: 3–1 (home: 2–1; road: 1–0)

Game	Date	Team	Score	High points	High rebounds	High assists	Location Attendance	Record
1	October 3	@ New York	W 115–107	D'Angelo Russell (19)	Trevor Booker (13)	D'Angelo Russell (4)	Madison Square Garden; 14,981	1–0
2	October 5	Miami	W 107–88	Jeremy Lin (16)	Booker, Carroll, Hollis-Jefferson, Mozgov (8)	Spencer Dinwiddie (6)	Barclays Center; N/A	2–0
3	October 8	New York	W 117–83	D'Angelo Russell (16)	Acy, Hollis-Jefferson (8)	Lin, Russell (7)	Barclays Center; 14,161	3–0
4	October 11	Philadelphia	L 114–133	D'Angelo Russell (24)	Acy, Allen (7)	Spencer Dinwiddie (4)	Nassau Veterans Memorial Coliseum; N/A	3–1

2017–18 season schedule

=== Regular season ===
2017–18 game log
Total: 28–54 (Home: 15–26; Road: 13–28)
October: 3–5 (home: 3–2; road: 0–3)

Game	Date	Team	Score	High points	High rebounds	High assists	Location Attendance	Record
1	October 18	@ Indiana	L 131–140	D'Angelo Russell (30)	Trevor Booker (10)	D'Angelo Russell (5)	Bankers Life Fieldhouse; 15,008	0–1
2	October 20	Orlando	W 126–121	Booker, Carroll, Russell (17)	Trevor Booker (11)	D'Angelo Russell (6)	Barclays Center; 16,144	1–1
3	October 22	Atlanta	W 116–104	Allen Crabbe (20)	Rondae Hollis-Jefferson (7)	D'Angelo Russell (10)	Barclays Center; 13,917	2–1
4	October 24	@ Orlando	L 121–125	D'Angelo Russell (29)	Booker, LeVert (8)	Caris LeVert (5)	Amway Center; 16,015	2–2
5	October 25	Cleveland	W 112–107	Spencer Dinwiddie (22)	Trevor Booker (8)	Spencer Dinwiddie (6)	Barclays Center; 17,732	3–2
6	October 27	@ New York	L 86–107	D'Angelo Russell (15)	Carroll, Mozgov (5)	Spencer Dinwiddie (11)	Madison Square Garden; 19,812	3–3
7	October 29	Denver	L 111–124	Spencer Dinwiddie (22)	Timofey Mozgov (11)	D'Angelo Russell (8)	Barclays Center; 14,854	3–4
8	October 31	Phoenix	L 114–122	D'Angelo Russell (33)	Rondae Hollis-Jefferson (7)	Dinwiddie, Russell (4)	Barclays Center; 12,936	3–5

November : 5–8 (home: 1–3; road: 4–5)

Game	Date	Team	Score	High points	High rebounds	High assists	Location Attendance	Record
9	November 3	@ LA Lakers	L 112–124	Allen Crabbe (25)	DeMarre Carroll (8)	D'Angelo Russell (7)	Staples Center; 18,997	3–6
10	November 6	@ Phoenix	W 98–92	D'Angelo Russell (23)	DeMarre Carroll (11)	D'Angelo Russell (8)	Talking Stick Resort Arena; 15,905	4–6
11	November 7	@ Denver	L 104–112	Tyler Zeller (21)	Jacob Wiley (8)	D'Angelo Russell (6)	Pepsi Center; 14,058	4–7
12	November 10	@ Portland	W 101–97	D'Angelo Russell (21)	Carroll, Hollis-Jefferson (8)	D'Angelo Russell (9)	Moda Center; 19,393	5–7
13	November 11	@ Utah	L 106–114	D'Angelo Russell (26)	DeMarre Carroll (7)	Hollis-Jefferson, Russell (3)	Vivint Smart Home Arena; 17,413	5–8
14	November 14	Boston	L 102–109	Joe Harris (19)	Rondae Hollis-Jefferson (9)	Spencer Dinwiddie (11)	Barclays Center; 17,732	5–9
15	November 17	Utah	W 118–107	Spencer Dinwiddie (25)	Booker, Crabbe, Dinwiddie, Zeller (5)	Spencer Dinwiddie (8)	Barclays Center; 14,495	6–9
16	November 19	Golden State	L 111–118	Allen Crabbe (25)	Rondae Hollis-Jefferson (12)	Spencer Dinwiddie (8)	Barclays Center; 17,732	6–10
17	November 22	@ Cleveland	L 109–119	Rondae Hollis-Jefferson (20)	LeVert, Zeller (7)	Spencer Dinwiddie (10)	Quicken Loans Arena; 20,562	6–11
18	November 24	Portland	L 125–127	Spencer Dinwiddie (23)	DeMarre Carroll (9)	Spencer Dinwiddie (6)	Barclays Center; 15,246	6–12
19	November 26	@ Memphis	W 98–88	DeMarre Carroll (24)	Trevor Booker (11)	Spencer Dinwiddie (7)	FedExForum; 14,889	7–12
20	November 27	@ Houston	L 103–117	Isaiah Whitehead (24)	Jarrett Allen (8)	Spencer Dinwiddie (7)	Toyota Center; 16,189	7–13
21	November 29	@ Dallas	W 109–104	DeMarre Carroll (22)	Trevor Booker (10)	Spencer Dinwiddie (6)	American Airlines Center; 19,327	8–13

December : 5–10 (home: 3–5; road: 2–5)

Game	Date	Team	Score	High points	High rebounds	High assists	Location Attendance	Record
22	December 2	Atlanta	L 102–114	Spencer Dinwiddie (15)	DeMarre Carroll (10)	Spencer Dinwiddie (9)	Barclays Center; 13,949	8–14
23	December 4	@ Atlanta	W 110–90	Caris LeVert (17)	Rondae Hollis-Jefferson (10)	Dinwiddie, LeVert (6)	Philips Arena; 12,056	9–14
24	December 7	Oklahoma City	W 100–95	Caris LeVert (21)	DeMarre Carroll (9)	Caris LeVert (10)	Mexico City Arena; 20,562	10–14
25	December 9	Miami	L 89–101	Rondae Hollis-Jefferson (18)	Rondae Hollis-Jefferson (8)	Spencer Dinwiddie (9)	Mexico City Arena; 19,777	10–15
26	December 12	Washington	W 103–98	Hollis-Jefferson, LeVert (16)	Rondae Hollis-Jefferson (12)	Spencer Dinwiddie (12)	Barclays Center; 14,515	11–15
27	December 14	New York	L 104–111	Spencer Dinwiddie (26)	Tyler Zeller (8)	Spencer Dinwiddie (7)	Barclays Center; 17,732	11–16
28	December 15	@ Toronto	L 87–120	Nik Stauskas (22)	Acy, Stauskas (7)	Spencer Dinwiddie (5)	Air Canada Centre; 19,800	11–17
29	December 17	Indiana	L 97–109	Allen Crabbe (17)	Rondae Hollis-Jefferson (6)	Spencer Dinwiddie (9)	Barclays Center; 13,934	11–18
30	December 20	Sacramento	L 99–104	Spencer Dinwiddie (16)	Rondae Hollis-Jefferson (10)	Dinwiddie, LeVert (4)	Barclays Center; 13,179	11–19
31	December 22	Washington	W 119–84	Rondae Hollis-Jefferson (21)	Rondae Hollis-Jefferson (11)	Joe Harris (7)	Barclays Center; 15,589	12–19
32	December 23	@ Indiana	L 119–123 (OT)	Spencer Dinwiddie (26)	DeMarre Carroll (13)	Spencer Dinwiddie (8)	Bankers Life Fieldhouse; 18,165	12–20
33	December 26	@ San Antonio	L 97–109	Caris LeVert (18)	Quincy Acy (10)	Spencer Dinwiddie (7)	AT&T Center; 18,492	12–21
34	December 27	@ New Orleans	L 113–128	Caris LeVert (22)	Rondae Hollis-Jefferson (7)	Caris LeVert (7)	Smoothie King Center; 16,707	12–22
35	December 29	@ Miami	W 111–87	Joe Harris (21)	Jarrett Allen (9)	Caris LeVert (11)	American Airlines Arena; 19,600	13–22
36	December 31	@ Boston	L 105–108	Rondae Hollis-Jefferson (22)	Rondae Hollis-Jefferson (12)	Spencer Dinwiddie (9)	TD Garden; 18,624	13–23

January : 6–10 (home: 4–5; road: 2–5)

Game	Date	Team	Score	High points	High rebounds	High assists	Location Attendance	Record
37	January 1	Orlando	W 98–95	Jarrett Allen (16)	DeMarre Carroll (10)	Caris LeVert (8)	Barclays Center; 16,164	14–23
38	January 3	Minnesota	W 98–97	Spencer Dinwiddie (26)	Allen Crabbe (8)	Spencer Dinwiddie (9)	Barclays Center; 16,215	15–23
39	January 6	Boston	L 85–87	Spencer Dinwiddie (20)	Joe Harris (12)	Spencer Dinwiddie (3)	Barclays Center; 17,732	15–24
40	January 8	Toronto	L 113–114 (OT)	Spencer Dinwiddie (31)	Rondae Hollis-Jefferson (17)	Spencer Dinwiddie (8)	Barclays Center; 13,681	15–25
41	January 10	Detroit	L 80–114	Allen Crabbe (20)	Rondae Hollis-Jefferson (7)	Crabbe, Dinwiddie, Hollis-Jefferson, LeVert (3)	Barclays Center; 13,457	15–26
42	January 12	@ Atlanta	W 110–105	Spencer Dinwiddie (20)	Spencer Dinwiddie (9)	Spencer Dinwiddie (10)	Philips Arena; 13,093	16–26
43	January 13	@ Washington	L 113–119 (OT)	Rondae Hollis-Jefferson (22)	DeMarre Carroll (10)	Caris LeVert (8)	Capital One Arena; 18,354	16–27
44	January 15	NY Knicks	L 104–119	DeMarre Carroll (22)	DeMarre Carroll (8)	Spencer Dinwiddie (5)	Barclays Center; 17,732	16–28
45	January 17	San Antonio	L 95–100	Allen Crabbe (20)	DeMarre Carroll (10)	Spencer Dinwiddie (13)	Barclays Center; 15,425	16–29
46	January 19	Miami	W 101–95	DeMarre Carroll (26)	Jarrett Allen (7)	Caris LeVert (5)	Barclays Center; 17,732	17–29
47	January 21	@ Detroit	W 101–100	Spencer Dinwiddie (22)	Tyler Zeller (9)	Rondae Hollis-Jefferson (7)	Little Caesars Arena; 17,554	18–29
48	January 23	@ Oklahoma City	L 108–109	Joe Harris (19)	Jarrett Allen (11)	Spencer Dinwiddie (7)	Chesapeake Energy Arena; 18,203	18–30
49	January 26	@ Milwaukee	L 91–116	Carroll, Russell (14)	Carroll, LeVert (9)	Caris LeVert (4)	Bradley Center; 18,717	18–31
50	January 27	@ Minnesota	L 97–111	Jahlil Okafor (21)	Quincy Acy (7)	Spencer Dinwiddie (10)	Target Center; 16,231	18–32
51	January 30	@ NY Knicks	L 95–111	DeMarre Carroll (13)	Jahlil Okafor (13)	Spencer Dinwiddie (7)	Madison Square Garden; 19,505	18–33
52	January 31	Philadelphia	W 116–108	Spencer Dinwiddie (24)	Jarrett Allen (12)	DeMarre Carroll (5)	Barclays Center; 15,577	19–33

February : 1–9 (home: 1–6; road: 0–3)

Game	Date	Team	Score	High points	High rebounds	High assists	Location Attendance	Record
53	February 2	LA Lakers	L 99–102	Spencer Dinwiddie (23)	Dinwiddie, Harris (7)	Spencer Dinwiddie (9)	Barclays Center; 17,732	19–34
54	February 4	Milwaukee	L 94–109	Carroll, LeVert (15)	Jarrett Allen (7)	Spencer Dinwiddie (10)	Barclays Center; 14,392	19–35
55	February 6	Houston	L 113–123	DeMarre Carroll (23)	Joe Harris (8)	Spencer Dinwiddie (9)	Barclays Center; 15,064	19–36
56	February 7	@ Detroit	L 106–115	Allen Crabbe (34)	Jarrett Allen (14)	Spencer Dinwiddie (11)	Little Caesars Arena; 15,114	19–37
57	February 10	New Orleans	L 128–138 (2OT)	Allen Crabbe (28)	Joe Harris (10)	Spencer Dinwiddie (10)	Barclays Center; 16,572	19–38
58	February 12	LA Clippers	L 101–114	D'Angelo Russell (16)	DeMarre Carroll (10)	Spencer Dinwiddie (8)	Barclays Center; 13,735	19–39
59	February 14	Indiana	L 103–108	Allen Crabbe (24)	DeMarre Carroll (10)	D'Angelo Russell (9)	Barclays Center; 13,159	19–40
60	February 22	@ Charlotte	L 96–111	Dante Cunningham (22)	Dante Cunningham (12)	Spencer Dinwiddie (9)	Spectrum Center; 19,077	19–41
61	February 26	Chicago	W 104–87	Allen Crabbe (21)	Allen, Cunningham (9)	Spencer Dinwiddie (9)	Barclays Center; 15,081	20–41
62	February 27	@ Cleveland	L 123–129	D'Angelo Russell (25)	Rondae Hollis-Jefferson (7)	Spencer Dinwiddie (11)	Quicken Loans Arena; 20,562	20–42

March : 5–9 (home: 2–4; road: 3–5)

Game	Date	Team	Score	High points	High rebounds	High assists	Location Attendance	Record
63	March 1	@ Sacramento	L 111–116 (OT)	DeMarre Carroll (22)	Jarrett Allen (13)	D'Angelo Russell (12)	Golden 1 Center; 17,583	20–43
64	March 4	@ LA Clippers	L 120–123	Caris LeVert (20)	Rondae Hollis-Jefferson (8)	Spencer Dinwiddie (10)	Staples Center; 16,384	20–44
65	March 6	@ Golden State	L 101–114	D'Angelo Russell (22)	DeMarre Carroll (7)	D'Angelo Russell (8)	Oracle Arena; 19,596	20–45
66	March 8	@ Charlotte	W 125–111	Allen Crabbe (29)	Rondae Hollis-Jefferson (12)	Spencer Dinwiddie (10)	Spectrum Center; 14,173	21–45
67	March 11	Philadelphia	L 97–120	D'Angelo Russell (26)	Allen, Carroll, Cunningham, Hollis-Jefferson (6)	Spencer Dinwiddie (6)	Barclays Center; 16,901	21–46
68	March 13	Toronto	L 102–116	D'Angelo Russell (32)	Hollis-Jefferson, Russell (7)	Caris LeVert (7)	Barclays Center; 16,654	21–47
69	March 16	@ Philadelphia	L 116–120	Rondae Hollis-Jefferson (21)	DeMarre Carroll (11)	Joe Harris (6)	Wells Fargo Center; 20,666	21–48
70	March 17	Dallas	W 114–106	Rondae Hollis-Jefferson (23)	DeMarre Carroll (12)	D'Angelo Russell (6)	Barclays Center; 13,877	22–48
71	March 19	Memphis	W 118–115	Crabbe, LeVert (22)	Rondae Hollis-Jefferson (12)	D'Angelo Russell (7)	Barclays Center; 12,856	23–48
72	March 21	Charlotte	L 105–111	D'Angelo Russell (19)	Jarrett Allen (9)	D'Angelo Russell (5)	Barclays Center; 10,231	23–49
73	March 23	@ Toronto	L 112–116	Crabbe, Hollis-Jefferson, Russell (18)	D'Angelo Russell (11)	D'Angelo Russell (13)	Air Canada Centre; 19,800	23–50
74	March 25	Cleveland	L 114–121	Joe Harris (30)	Harris, Hollis-Jefferson (7)	Caris LeVert (7)	Barclays Center; 17,732	23–51
75	March 28	@ Orlando	W 111–104	LeVert, Russell (16)	DeMarre Carroll (12)	D'Angelo Russell (12)	Amway Center; 16,517	24–51
76	March 31	@ Miami	W 110–109 (OT)	Rondae Hollis-Jefferson (20)	Rondae Hollis-Jefferson (14)	Spencer Dinwiddie (12)	American Airlines Arena; 19,600	25–51

April : 3–3 (home: 1–1; road: 2–2)

Game	Date	Team	Score	High points	High rebounds	High assists	Location Attendance	Record
77	April 1	Detroit	L 96–108	Allen, Harris (15)	Rondae Hollis-Jefferson (8)	LeVert, Russell (7)	Barclays Center; 16,097	25–52
78	April 3	@ Philadelphia	L 95–121	Spencer Dinwiddie (16)	Dinwiddie, Russell (6)	Spencer Dinwiddie (6)	Wells Fargo Center; 20,710	25–53
79	April 5	@ Milwaukee	W 119–111	Allen Crabbe (25)	Rondae Hollis-Jefferson (11)	Joe Harris (6)	Bradley Center; 18,376	26–53
80	April 7	@ Chicago	W 124–96	Quincy Acy (21)	Dante Cunningham (12)	Spencer Dinwiddie (9)	United Center; 21,669	27–53
81	April 9	Chicago	W 114–105	Allen Crabbe (41)	Hollis-Jefferson, Russell (6)	D'Angelo Russell (11)	Barclays Center; 16,187	28–53
82	April 11	@ Boston	L 97–110	Nik Stauskas (18)	Jarrett Allen (7)	Caris LeVert (6)	TD Garden; 18,624	28–54

2017–18 season schedule

== Standings ==
=== Division ===
Atlantic Division	W	L	PCT	GB	Home	Road	Div	GP
c – Toronto Raptors	59	23	.720	–	34‍–‍7	25‍–‍16	12–4	82
x – Boston Celtics	55	27	.671	4.0	27‍–‍14	28‍–‍13	12–4	82
x – Philadelphia 76ers	52	30	.634	7.0	30‍–‍11	22‍–‍19	9–7	82
New York Knicks	29	53	.354	30.0	19‍–‍22	10‍–‍31	6–10	82
Brooklyn Nets	28	54	.341	31.0	15‍–‍26	13‍–‍28	1–15	82

=== Conference ===
Eastern Conference
#	Team	W	L	PCT	GB	GP
1	c – Toronto Raptors *	59	23	.720	–	82
2	x – Boston Celtics	55	27	.671	4.0	82
3	x – Philadelphia 76ers	52	30	.634	7.0	82
4	y – Cleveland Cavaliers *	50	32	.610	9.0	82
5	x – Indiana Pacers	48	34	.585	11.0	82
6	y – Miami Heat *	44	38	.537	15.0	82
7	x – Milwaukee Bucks	44	38	.537	15.0	82
8	x – Washington Wizards	43	39	.524	16.0	82
9	Detroit Pistons	39	43	.476	20.0	82
10	Charlotte Hornets	36	46	.439	23.0	82
11	New York Knicks	29	53	.354	30.0	82
12	Brooklyn Nets	28	54	.341	31.0	82
13	Chicago Bulls	27	55	.329	32.0	82
14	Orlando Magic	25	57	.305	34.0	82
15	Atlanta Hawks	24	58	.293	35.0	82

== Player statistics ==
Legend
GP	Games played	GS	Games started	MPG	Minutes per game
FG%	Field-goal percentage	3P%	3-point field-goal percentage	FT%	Free-throw percentage
RPG	Rebounds per game	APG	Assists per game	SPG	Steals per game
BPG	Blocks per game	PPG	Points per game

=== Regular season ===
Brooklyn Nets statistics
Player	GP	GS	MPG	FG%	3P%	FT%	RPG	APG	SPG	BPG	PPG
Spencer Dinwiddie	80	58	28.8	.387	.326	.813	3.2	6.6	.9	.3	12.6
Joe Harris	78	14	25.3	.491	.419	.827	3.3	1.6	.4	.3	10.8
Allen Crabbe	75	68	29.3	.407	.378	.852	4.3	1.6	.6	.5	13.2
DeMarre Carroll	73	73	29.9	.414	.371	.764	6.6	2.0	.8	.4	13.5
Jarrett Allen	72	31	20.0	.589	.333	.776	5.4	.7	.4	1.2	8.2
Caris LeVert	71	10	26.3	.435	.347	.711	3.7	4.2	1.2	.3	12.1
Quincy Acy	70	8	19.4	.356	.349	.817	3.7	.8	.5	.4	5.9
Rondae Hollis-Jefferson	68	59	28.2	.472	.241	.788	6.8	2.5	1.0	.7	13.9
D'Angelo Russell	48	35	25.7	.414	.324	.740	3.9	5.2	.8	.4	15.5
Tyler Zeller^{†}	42	33	16.7	.546	.385	.667	4.6	.7	.2	.5	7.1
Nik Stauskas^{†}	35	0	13.7	.393	.404	.704	1.8	1.1	.1	.1	5.1
Timofey Mozgov	31	13	11.6	.559	.222	.767	3.2	.4	.2	.4	4.2
Jahlil Okafor^{†}	26	0	12.6	.566	.250	.760	2.9	.4	.1	.6	6.4
Dante Cunningham^{†}	22	1	20.3	.468	.383	.688	4.8	1.0	.5	.6	7.5
Trevor Booker^{†}	18	6	21.9	.513	.250	.558	6.6	2.1	.4	.3	10.1
Sean Kilpatrick^{†}	16	0	11.4	.287	.256	.947	2.2	.9	.1	.1	4.9
Isaiah Whitehead	16	0	11.3	.465	.389	.684	1.6	1.3	.5	.1	6.3
Milton Doyle	10	0	12.5	.277	.174	.500	1.8	1.0	.6	.2	3.4
James Webb III	10	0	12.0	.250	.211		2.4	.4	.1	.0	1.6
Jacob Wiley	5	0	6.6	.250	.500	.500	2.2	.4	.2	.0	.8
Jeremy Lin	1	1	25.0	.417	.500	1.000	.0	4.0	.0	.0	18.0
Rashad Vaughn^{†}	1	0	4.0				.0	1.0	.0	.0	.0

- ^{†} Denotes player spent time with another team in the season. Stats reflect time with the Nets only.

== Transactions ==
=== Trades ===
June 20, 2017	To Brooklyn Nets D'Angelo Russell; Timofey Mozgov	To Los Angeles Lakers Brook Lopez; Draft rights to Kyle Kuzma (pick 27)
July 13, 2017	To Brooklyn Nets DeMarre Carroll; 2018 first-round pick 2018 second-round pick	To Toronto Raptors Justin Hamilton
December 7, 2017	To Brooklyn Nets Jahlil Okafor; Nik Stauskas; 2019 second-round pick	To Philadelphia 76ers Trevor Booker
February 5, 2018	To Brooklyn Nets Rashad Vaughn; 2018 or 2020 second-round pick	To Milwaukee Bucks Tyler Zeller
February 8, 2018	To Brooklyn Nets Dante Cunningham	To New Orleans Pelicans Rashad Vaughn

=== Free agency ===
==== Additions ====
Player	Signed	Former team
Yakuba Ouattara	Two-way contract	(France) / Association Sportive de Monaco Basketball Club
Milton Doyle	Two-way contract	Loyola (Illinois) Ramblers / Long Island Nets
Jacob Wiley	Two-way contract	Eastern Washington Eagles
James Webb III	Two-way contract	Delaware 87ers

==== Subtractions ====
Player	Reason left	New Team
Brook Lopez	Traded	Los Angeles Lakers
Justin Hamilton	Traded	(Canada) Toronto Raptors / (China) Beijing Ducks
Archie Goodwin	Waived	Portland Trail Blazers / Greensboro Swarm / Northern Arizona Suns
Sean Kilpatrick	Waived	Milwaukee Bucks
Yakuba Ouattara	Waived	Long Island Nets
