= 2017–18 Minnesota Timberwolves season =

NBA professional basketball team season

- Head coach: Tom Thibodeau
- General manager: Scott Layden
- Owners: Glen Taylor
- Arena: Target Center

Results
- Record: 47–35 (.573)
- Place: Division: 4th (Northwest); Conference: 8th (Western)
- Playoff finish: First Round; (lost to Rockets 1–4)
- Stats at Basketball Reference

Local media
- Television: Fox Sports North
- Radio: WCCO

The 2017–18 Minnesota Timberwolves season was the 29th season of the franchise in the National Basketball Association (NBA). On April 11, 2017, the team unveiled a rebranded logo and uniforms aligned with the league's shift to Nike jerseys, using that identity until 2025–26.

They clinched their first winning season since 2005 with a win over the New York Knicks on March 23, 2018. On April 11, 2018, the Timberwolves clinched a playoff berth for the first time since 2004 with a win over the Denver Nuggets, ending what was the longest post-season drought in the NBA at the time, at 13 seasons to pass the Sacramento Kings to currently make the longest postseason NBA drought. The last time the Wolves made the playoffs was during the Kevin Garnett era where he led them to the conference finals that year. The Wolves also signed free agent Derrick Rose, after he considered joining teams such as the Golden State Warriors, San Antonio Spurs, and Washington Wizards. The signing reunited Rose with former Chicago Bulls teammates Jimmy Butler and Taj Gibson, as well as coach Tom Thibodeau, all of whom were part of the franchise from 2011 to 2015. These acquisitions would earn the team the nickname “TimberBulls” from the media and fans.

They finished the regular season with a 47–35 record, which clinched the 8th seed. In the playoffs, the Timberwolves faced the top-seeded Houston Rockets in the first round, and lost in five games.

Until 2022, this was the last season that the Timberwolves made the playoffs or had a winning season.

== Draft ==
Round	Pick	Player	Position	Nationality	College
1	7	Lauri Markkanen	PF/C	Finland	Arizona

Entering the draft, the Timberwolves only held one first round pick at #7; their second round pick was forced to be traded away to the Boston Celtics due to a previous trade involving the Phoenix Suns (and former New Orleans Hornets) allowing the Suns (later Celtics) to acquire their 2017 second round pick if their lottery protected pick wasn't acquired by 2016. Exiting draft night, however, they traded away their #7 pick, which was the Finnish center/power forward Lauri Markkanen from University of Arizona, alongside last year's top selection (Kris Dunn) and Zach LaVine to the Chicago Bulls in exchange for All-Star shooting guard/small forward Jimmy Butler and the Bulls' own first round selection, which was #16 pick Justin Patton, a redshirt freshman center from Creighton University.

== Roster ==
2017–18 Minnesota Timberwolves roster
Players

Pos.	No.	Player	Height	Weight	DOB	From
C	45	Cole Aldrich	6 ft 11 in (2.11 m)	253 lb (115 kg)	1988–10–31	Kansas
F	8	Nemanja Bjelica	6 ft 10 in (2.08 m)	230 lb (104 kg)	1988–05–09	Serbia
G	30	Aaron Brooks	6 ft 0 in (1.83 m)	161 lb (73 kg)	1985–01–14	Oregon
F	3	Anthony Brown (TW)	6 ft 7 in (2.01 m)	224 lb (102 kg)	1992–10–10	Stanford
G	23	Jimmy Butler	6 ft 8 in (2.03 m)	236 lb (107 kg)	1989–09–14	Marquette
G	11	Jamal Crawford	6 ft 5 in (1.96 m)	185 lb (84 kg)	1980–03–20	Michigan
C	5	Gorgui Dieng	6 ft 11 in (2.11 m)	251 lb (114 kg)	1990–01–18	Louisville
G	13	Marcus Georges-Hunt	6 ft 5 in (1.96 m)	226 lb (103 kg)	1994–03–28	Georgia Tech
F	67	Taj Gibson	6 ft 9 in (2.06 m)	235 lb (107 kg)	1985–06–24	USC
F	10	Amile Jefferson	6 ft 9 in (2.06 m)	224 lb (102 kg)	1993–05–07	Duke
G	1	Tyus Jones	6 ft 2 in (1.88 m)	184 lb (83 kg)	1996–05–10	Duke
C	24	Justin Patton	7 ft 0 in (2.13 m)	251 lb (114 kg)	1997–06–14	Creighton
G	25	Derrick Rose	6 ft 3 in (1.91 m)	190 lb (86 kg)	1988–10–04	Memphis
G	0	Jeff Teague	6 ft 2 in (1.88 m)	189 lb (86 kg)	1988–06–10	Wake Forest
C	32	Karl-Anthony Towns	7 ft 0 in (2.13 m)	248 lb (112 kg)	1995–11–15	Kentucky
F	22	Andrew Wiggins	6 ft 8 in (2.03 m)	202 lb (92 kg)	1995–02–23	Kansas

Coaches
Head coach
- Tom Thibodeau
Assistant(s)
- Rick Brunson
- Andy Greer
- Ed Pinckney
- Ryan Saunders
- John Lucas III (player development)
- Vince Legarza (player development)

Legend
- (DP) Unsigned draft pick
- (FA) Free agent
- (S) Suspended
- (GL) On assignment to G League affiliate
- (TW) Two-way affiliate player
- Injured

Roster
Updated: 2018–04–11

== Standings ==
=== Division ===
Northwest Division	W	L	PCT	GB	Home	Road	Div	GP
y – Portland Trail Blazers	49	33	.598	–	28‍–‍13	21‍–‍20	9–7	82
x – Oklahoma City Thunder	48	34	.585	1.0	27‍–‍14	21‍–‍20	5–11	82
x – Utah Jazz	48	34	.585	1.0	28‍–‍13	20‍–‍21	7–9	82
x – Minnesota Timberwolves	47	35	.573	2.0	30‍–‍11	17‍–‍24	10–6	82
Denver Nuggets	46	36	.561	3.0	31‍–‍10	15‍–‍26	9–7	82

=== Conference ===
Western Conference
#	Team	W	L	PCT	GB	GP
1	z – Houston Rockets *	65	17	.793	–	82
2	y – Golden State Warriors *	58	24	.707	7.0	82
3	y – Portland Trail Blazers *	49	33	.598	16.0	82
4	x – Oklahoma City Thunder	48	34	.585	17.0	82
5	x – Utah Jazz	48	34	.585	17.0	82
6	x – New Orleans Pelicans	48	34	.585	17.0	82
7	x – San Antonio Spurs	47	35	.573	18.0	82
8	x – Minnesota Timberwolves	47	35	.573	18.0	82
9	Denver Nuggets	46	36	.561	19.0	82
10	Los Angeles Clippers	42	40	.512	23.0	82
11	Los Angeles Lakers	35	47	.427	30.0	82
12	Sacramento Kings	27	55	.329	38.0	82
13	Dallas Mavericks	24	58	.293	41.0	82
14	Memphis Grizzlies	22	60	.268	43.0	82
15	Phoenix Suns	21	61	.256	44.0	82

== Game log ==
=== Preseason ===
2017 pre-season game log
Total: 2–1 (home: 1–1; road: 1–0)
Pre-season: 2–1 (home: 1–1; road: 1–0)

Game	Date	Team	Score	High points	High rebounds	High assists	Location Attendance	Record
1	September 30	@ LA Lakers	W 108–99	Shabazz Muhammad (22)	Gorgui Dieng (12)	Jeff Teague (9)	Honda Center; 18,000	1–0
2	October 5	@ Golden State	W 111–97	Butler, Towns (16)	Gorgui Dieng (10)	Tyus Jones (6)	Shenzhen Universiade Sports Centre; 17,495	2–0
3	October 8	Golden State	L 110–142	Andrew Wiggins (19)	Cole Aldrich (6)	Jimmy Butler (7)	Mercedes-Benz Arena; N/A	2–1

2017–18 season schedule

=== Regular season ===
2017–18 game log
Total: 47–35 (home: 30–11; road: 17–24)
October: 4–3 (home: 2–1; road: 2–2)

Game	Date	Team	Score	High points	High rebounds	High assists	Location Attendance	Record
1	October 18	@ San Antonio	L 99–107	Andrew Wiggins (26)	Karl-Anthony Towns (13)	Jeff Teague (6)	AT&T Center; 18,418	0–1
2	October 20	Utah	W 100–97	Karl-Anthony Towns (20)	Karl-Anthony Towns (10)	Tyus Jones (5)	Target Center; 18,978	1–1
3	October 22	@ Oklahoma City	W 115–113	Towns, Wiggins (27)	Karl-Anthony Towns (13)	Jeff Teague (9)	Chesapeake Energy Arena; 18,203	2–1
4	October 24	Indiana	L 107–130	Karl-Anthony Towns (28)	Karl-Anthony Towns (7)	Jamal Crawford (9)	Target Center; 14,353	2–2
5	October 25	@ Detroit	L 101–122	Karl-Anthony Towns (23)	Karl-Anthony Towns (10)	Jeff Teague (6)	Little Caesars Arena; 13,790	2–3
6	October 27	Oklahoma City	W 119–116	Karl-Anthony Towns (33)	Karl-Anthony Towns (19)	Jeff Teague (10)	Target Center; 17,620	3–3
7	October 30	@ Miami	W 125–122 (OT)	Jeff Teague (23)	Karl-Anthony Towns (12)	Jeff Teague (11)	American Airlines Arena; 19,600	4–3

November : 9–6 (home: 5–3; road: 4–3)

Game	Date	Team	Score	High points	High rebounds	High assists	Location Attendance	Record
8	November 1	@ New Orleans	W 104–98	Jimmy Butler (23)	Taj Gibson (12)	Jeff Teague (9)	Smoothie King Center; 14,788	5–3
9	November 4	Dallas	W 112–99	Karl-Anthony Towns (31)	Karl-Anthony Towns (12)	Jeff Teague (10)	Target Center; 16,837	6–3
10	November 5	Charlotte	W 112–94	Andrew Wiggins (20)	Gorgui Dieng (11)	Jeff Teague (12)	Target Center; 14,124	7–3
11	November 8	@ Golden State	L 101–125	Karl-Anthony Towns (16)	Karl-Anthony Towns (12)	Butler, Jeff Teague (5)	Oracle Arena; 19,596	7–4
12	November 11	@ Phoenix	L 110–118	Andrew Wiggins (27)	Karl-Anthony Towns (12)	Butler, Jeff Teague (5)	Talking Stick Resort Arena; 16,910	7–5
13	November 13	@ Utah	W 109–98	Karl-Anthony Towns (24)	Karl-Anthony Towns (13)	Jimmy Butler (10)	Vivint Smart Home Arena; 17,236	8–5
14	November 15	San Antonio	W 98–86	Karl-Anthony Towns (26)	Karl-Anthony Towns (16)	Jeff Teague (6)	Target Center; 18,978	9–5
15	November 17	@ Dallas	W 111–87	Jimmy Butler (21)	Gibson, Towns (11)	Jeff Teague (10)	American Airlines Center; 19,459	10–5
16	November 19	Detroit	L 97–100	Jimmy Butler (26)	Jimmy Butler (9)	Jeff Teague (9)	Target Center; 16,069	10–6
17	November 20	@ Charlotte	L 102–118	Jamal Crawford (19)	Karl-Anthony Towns (12)	Tyus Jones (3)	Spectrum Center; 15,978	10–7
18	November 22	Orlando	W 124–118	Jimmy Butler (26)	Karl-Anthony Towns (13)	Jeff Teague (11)	Target Center; 16,402	11–7
19	November 24	Miami	L 97–109	Butler, Towns, Wiggins (18)	Karl-Anthony Towns (11)	Tyus Jones (6)	Target Center; 18,978	11–8
20	November 26	Phoenix	W 119–108	Karl-Anthony Towns (32)	Taj Gibson (14)	Tyus Jones (7)	Target Center; 16,448	12–8
21	November 28	Washington	L 89–92	Karl-Anthony Towns (20)	Karl-Anthony Towns (17)	Jimmy Butler (10)	Target Center; 13,442	12–9
22	November 29	@ New Orleans	W 120–102	Andrew Wiggins (28)	Gibson, Towns (10)	Tyus Jones (6)	Smoothie King Center; 15,555	13–9

December : 10–5 (home: 5–2; road: 5–3)

Game	Date	Team	Score	High points	High rebounds	High assists	Location Attendance	Record
23	December 1	@ Oklahoma City	L 107–111	Towns, Wiggins (23)	Karl-Anthony Towns (9)	Jeff Teague (10)	Chesapeake Energy Arena; 18,203	13–10
24	December 3	LA Clippers	W 112–106	Jimmy Butler (33)	Karl-Anthony Towns (12)	Jeff Teague (10)	Target Center; 13,172	14–10
25	December 4	@ Memphis	L 92–95	Jimmy Butler (30)	Karl-Anthony Towns (11)	Jimmy Butler (5)	FedExForum; 14,012	14–11
26	December 6	@ LA Clippers	W 113–107	Karl-Anthony Towns (21)	Taj Gibson (14)	Jimmy Butler (8)	Staples Center; 15,951	15–11
27	December 10	Dallas	W 97–92	Karl-Anthony Towns (28)	Karl-Anthony Towns (12)	Butler, Jeff Teague (5)	Target Center; 13,094	16–11
28	December 12	Philadelphia	L 112–118 (OT)	Jimmy Butler (38)	Karl-Anthony Towns (16)	Jamal Crawford (5)	Target Center; 14,659	16–12
29	December 14	Sacramento	W 119–96	Karl-Anthony Towns (30)	Karl-Anthony Towns (14)	Jimmy Butler (9)	Target Center; 11,126	17–12
30	December 16	Phoenix	L 106–108	Karl-Anthony Towns (28)	Karl-Anthony Towns (11)	Jeff Teague (8)	Target Center; 18,109	17–13
31	December 18	Portland	W 108–107	Jimmy Butler (37)	Karl-Anthony Towns (8)	Jeff Teague (5)	Target Center; 14,187	18–13
32	December 20	@ Denver	W 112–104	Butler, Towns (25)	Karl-Anthony Towns (10)	Jeff Teague (8)	Pepsi Center; 17,002	19–13
33	December 23	@ Phoenix	W 115–106	Jimmy Butler (32)	Karl-Anthony Towns (14)	Jeff Teague (6)	Talking Stick Resort Arena; 16,482	20–13
34	December 25	@ LA Lakers	W 121–104	Butler, Gibson (23)	Karl-Anthony Towns (10)	Jeff Teague (10)	Staples Center; 18,997	21–13
35	December 27	Denver	W 128–125 (OT)	Jimmy Butler (39)	Karl-Anthony Towns (13)	Jeff Teague (10)	Target Center; 18,978	22–13
36	December 28	@ Milwaukee	L 96–102	Karl-Anthony Towns (22)	Gorgui Dieng (8)	Jimmy Butler (7)	Bradley Center; 18,717	22–14
37	December 31	@ Indiana	W 107–90	Jimmy Butler (26)	Karl-Anthony Towns (14)	Jeff Teague (6)	Bankers Life Fieldhouse; 17,923	23–14

January : 9–8 (home: 8–0; road: 1–8)

Game	Date	Team	Score	High points	High rebounds	High assists	Location Attendance	Record
38	January 1	LA Lakers	W 114–96	Jimmy Butler (28)	Karl-Anthony Towns (13)	Jeff Teague (9)	Target Center; 18,978	24–14
39	January 3	@ Brooklyn	L 97–98	Jimmy Butler (30)	Karl-Anthony Towns (10)	Jimmy Butler (4)	Barclays Center; 16,215	24–15
40	January 5	@ Boston	L 84–91	Karl-Anthony Towns (25)	Karl-Anthony Towns (23)	Jimmy Butler (6)	TD Garden; 18,624	24–16
41	January 6	New Orleans	W 116–98	Karl-Anthony Towns (21)	Karl-Anthony Towns (16)	Jimmy Butler (8)	Target Center; 18,978	25–16
42	January 8	Cleveland	W 127–99	Andrew Wiggins (25)	Taj Gibson (13)	Jimmy Butler (9)	Target Center; 18,978	26–16
43	January 10	Oklahoma City	W 104–88	Jimmy Butler (26)	Karl-Anthony Towns (12)	Jimmy Butler (8)	Target Center; 18,978	27–16
44	January 12	NY Knicks	W 118–108	Karl-Anthony Towns (23)	Karl-Anthony Towns (15)	Karl-Anthony Towns (9)	Target Center; 18,978	28–16
45	January 14	Portland	W 120–103	Jimmy Butler (24)	Karl-Anthony Towns (11)	Jeff Teague (8)	Target Center; 14,739	29–16
46	January 16	@ Orlando	L 102–108	Jimmy Butler (28)	Karl-Anthony Towns (12)	Jeff Teague (6)	Amway Center; 18,589	29–17
47	January 18	@ Houston	L 98–116	Jimmy Butler (23)	Karl-Anthony Towns (13)	Jamal Crawford (5)	Toyota Center; 18,055	29–18
48	January 20	Toronto	W 115–109	Andrew Wiggins (29)	Karl-Anthony Towns (10)	Jeff Teague (10)	Target Center; 17,828	30–18
49	January 22	@ LA Clippers	W 126–118	Andrew Wiggins (40)	Karl-Anthony Towns (17)	Jeff Teague (6)	Staples Center; 16,347	31–18
50	January 24	@ Portland	L 114–123	Andrew Wiggins (24)	Karl-Anthony Towns (9)	Crawford, Jones (5)	Moda Center; 18,920	31–19
51	January 25	@ Golden State	L 113–126	Karl-Anthony Towns (31)	Karl-Anthony Towns (15)	Crawford, Towns (5)	Oracle Arena; 19,596	31–20
52	January 27	Brooklyn	W 111–97	Butler, Wiggins (21)	Karl-Anthony Towns (19)	Butler, Jones (5)	Target Center; 16,231	32–20
53	January 29	@ Atlanta	L 100–105	Jimmy Butler (24)	Karl-Anthony Towns (13)	Jeff Teague (10)	Philips Arena; 12,589	32–21
54	January 30	@ Toronto	L 104–109	Jimmy Butler (25)	Karl-Anthony Towns (10)	Jimmy Butler (6)	Air Canada Centre; 19,800	32–22

February : 6–4 (home: 5–1; road: 1–3)

Game	Date	Team	Score	High points	High rebounds	High assists	Location Attendance	Record
55	February 1	Milwaukee	W 108–89	Jimmy Butler (28)	Karl-Anthony Towns (11)	Jeff Teague (8)	Target Center; 17,199	33–22
56	February 3	New Orleans	W 118–107	Jimmy Butler (30)	Karl-Anthony Towns (16)	Jimmy Butler (7)	Target Center; 17,954	34–22
57	February 7	@ Cleveland	L 138–140 (OT)	Jimmy Butler (35)	Karl-Anthony Towns (10)	Jeff Teague (15)	Quicken Loans Arena; 20,562	34–23
58	February 9	@ Chicago	L 113–114	Jimmy Butler (38)	Karl-Anthony Towns (10)	Butler, Teague (5)	United Center; 21,558	34–24
59	February 11	Sacramento	W 111–106	Karl-Anthony Towns (29)	Towns, Wiggins (8)	Jeff Teague (9)	Target Center; 18,068	35–24
60	February 13	Houston	L 108–126	Karl-Anthony Towns (35)	Karl-Anthony Towns (12)	Jeff Teague (8)	Target Center; 18,978	35–25
61	February 15	LA Lakers	W 119–111	Taj Gibson (28)	Karl-Anthony Towns (19)	Jeff Teague (6)	Target Center; 17,534	36–25
All-Star Break
62	February 23	@ Houston	L 102–120	Andrew Wiggins (21)	Karl-Anthony Towns (13)	Jeff Teague (4)	Toyota Center; 18,055	36–26
63	February 24	Chicago	W 122–104	Jeff Teague (25)	Karl-Anthony Towns (13)	Jeff Teague (7)	Target Center; 18,978	37–26
64	February 26	@ Sacramento	W 118–100	Karl-Anthony Towns (26)	Karl-Anthony Towns (17)	Jeff Teague (7)	Golden 1 Center; 17,583	38–26

March : 6–7 (home: 3–3; road: 3–4)

Game	Date	Team	Score	High points	High rebounds	High assists	Location Attendance	Record
65	March 1	@ Portland	L 99–108	Karl-Anthony Towns (34)	Karl-Anthony Towns (17)	Jeff Teague (5)	Moda Center; 19,533	38–27
66	March 2	@ Utah	L 108–116	Andrew Wiggins (27)	Bjelica, Gibson, Teague, Towns (4)	Jamal Crawford (4)	Vivint Smart Home Arena; 18,306	38–28
67	March 8	Boston	L 109–117	Nemanja Bjelica (30)	Nemanja Bjelica (12)	Jeff Teague (8)	Target Center; 18,978	38–29
68	March 11	Golden State	W 109–103	Karl-Anthony Towns (31)	Karl-Anthony Towns (16)	Jeff Teague (10)	Target Center; 18,978	39–29
69	March 13	@ Washington	W 116–111	Karl-Anthony Towns (37)	Karl-Anthony Towns (10)	Nemanja Bjelica (7)	Capital One Arena; 17,078	40–29
70	March 17	@ San Antonio	L 101–117	Karl-Anthony Towns (23)	Karl-Anthony Towns (9)	Jeff Teague (8)	AT&T Center; 18,418	40–30
71	March 18	Houston	L 120–129	Jeff Teague (23)	Karl-Anthony Towns (18)	Jeff Teague (11)	Target Center; 18,978	40–31
72	March 20	LA Clippers	W 123–109	Karl-Anthony Towns (30)	Karl-Anthony Towns (10)	Jeff Teague (12)	Target Center; 16,351	41–31
73	March 23	@ NY Knicks	W 108–104	Karl-Anthony Towns (24)	Karl-Anthony Towns (13)	Jeff Teague (8)	Madison Square Garden; 18,914	42–31
74	March 24	@ Philadelphia	L 108–120	Andrew Wiggins (16)	Karl-Anthony Towns (11)	Tyus Jones (6)	Wells Fargo Center; 20,668	42–32
75	March 26	Memphis	L 93–101	Jeff Teague (25)	Karl-Anthony Towns (12)	Jeff Teague (7)	Target Center; 16,290	42–33
76	March 28	Atlanta	W 126–114	Karl-Anthony Towns (56)	Karl-Anthony Towns (15)	Jeff Teague (8)	Target Center; 16,183	43–33
77	March 30	@ Dallas	W 93–92	Karl-Anthony Towns (21)	Karl-Anthony Towns (20)	Tyus Jones (4)	American Airlines Center; 20,244	44–33

April : 3–2 (home: 2–1; road: 1–1)

Game	Date	Team	Score	High points	High rebounds	High assists	Location Attendance	Record
78	April 1	Utah	L 97–121	Andrew Wiggins (23)	Karl-Anthony Towns (7)	Jones, Wiggins (4)	Target Center; 18,978	44–34
79	April 5	@ Denver	L 96–100	Karl-Anthony Towns (26)	Taj Gibson (14)	Jeff Teague (6)	Pepsi Center; 16,415	44–35
80	April 6	@ LA Lakers	W 113–96	Jeff Teague (25)	Karl-Anthony Towns (11)	Jeff Teague (8)	Staples Center; 18,997	45–35
81	April 9	Memphis	W 113–94	Teague, Towns (25)	Karl-Anthony Towns (18)	Jeff Teague (8)	Target Center; 17,641	46–35
82	April 11	Denver	W 112–106 (OT)	Jimmy Butler (31)	Karl-Anthony Towns (14)	Jeff Teague (7)	Target Center; 18,978	47–35

2017–18 season schedule

=== Playoffs ===
2018 playoff game log
Total: 1–4 (home: 1–1; road: 0–3)
First Round: 1–4 (home: 1–1; road: 0–3)

Game	Date	Team	Score	High points	High rebounds	High assists	Location Attendance	Series
1	April 15	@ Houston	L 101–104	Andrew Wiggins (18)	Karl-Anthony Towns (12)	Jeff Teague (8)	Toyota Center; 18,055	0–1
2	April 18	@ Houston	L 82–102	Nemanja Bjelica (16)	Karl-Anthony Towns (10)	Jones, Wiggins (3)	Toyota Center; 18,055	0–2
3	April 21	Houston	W 121–105	Jimmy Butler (28)	Karl-Anthony Towns (16)	Jeff Teague (8)	Target Center; 18,978	1–2
4	April 23	Houston	L 100–119	Karl-Anthony Towns (22)	Karl-Anthony Towns (15)	Butler, Teague (5)	Target Center; 18,978	1–3
5	April 25	@ Houston	L 104–122	Karl-Anthony Towns (23)	Karl-Anthony Towns (14)	Jeff Teague (7)	Toyota Center; 18,055	1–4

2018 playoff schedule

== Player statistics ==
=== Regular season ===
Player	POS	GP	GS	MP	REB	AST	STL	BLK	PTS	MPG	RPG	APG	SPG	BPG	PPG
Andrew Wiggins	SF	82	82	2,979	358	160	91	51	1,452	36.3	4.4	2.0	1.1	.6	17.7
Karl-Anthony Towns	C	82	82	2,918	1,012	199	64	115	1,743	35.6	12.3	2.4	.8	1.4	21.3
Taj Gibson	PF	82	82	2,726	584	99	62	59	999	33.2	7.1	1.2	.8	.7	12.2
Tyus Jones	PG	82	11	1,467	132	232	95	6	416	17.9	1.6	2.8	1.2	.1	5.1
Jamal Crawford	SG	80	0	1,653	99	185	40	9	822	20.7	1.2	2.3	.5	.1	10.3
Gorgui Dieng	C	79	0	1,333	360	71	45	39	470	16.9	4.6	.9	.6	.5	5.9
Jeff Teague	PG	70	70	2,311	209	492	102	23	994	33.0	3.0	7.0	1.5	.3	14.2
Nemanja Bjelica	PF	67	21	1,371	274	86	50	16	454	20.5	4.1	1.3	.7	.2	6.8
Jimmy Butler	SG	59	59	2,164	314	288	116	24	1,307	36.7	5.3	4.9	2.0	.4	22.2
Marcus Georges-Hunt	SG	42	0	224	16	7	6	0	59	5.3	.4	.2	.1	.0	1.4
Shabazz Muhammad^{†}	SF	32	2	301	45	7	5	2	120	9.4	1.4	.2	.2	.1	3.8
Aaron Brooks	PG	32	1	189	17	20	6	0	75	5.9	.5	.6	.2	.0	2.3
Cole Aldrich	C	21	0	49	15	3	2	1	12	2.3	.7	.1	.1	.0	.6
Derrick Rose^{†}	PG	9	0	112	6	11	4	0	52	12.4	.7	1.2	.4	.0	5.8
Anthony Brown	SF	1	0	4	0	1	0	0	3	4.0	.0	1.0	.0	.0	3.0
Justin Patton	C	1	0	4	0	0	1	0	2	4.0	.0	.0	1.0	.0	2.0

- ^{†} Denotes player spent time with another team in the season. Stats reflect time with the Timberwolves only.

=== Playoffs ===
Player	POS	GP	GS	MP	REB	AST	STL	BLK	PTS	MPG	RPG	APG	SPG	BPG	PPG
Jimmy Butler	SG	5	5	170	30	20	4	1	79	34.0	6.0	4.0	.8	.2	15.8
Karl-Anthony Towns	C	5	5	170	67	11	2	5	76	34.0	13.4	2.2	.4	1.0	15.2
Andrew Wiggins	SF	5	5	164	26	10	2	2	79	32.8	5.2	2.0	.4	.4	15.8
Jeff Teague	PG	5	5	153	18	29	3	2	65	30.6	3.6	5.8	.6	.4	13.0
Taj Gibson	PF	5	5	123	20	2	1	2	31	24.6	4.0	.4	.2	.4	6.2
Jamal Crawford	SG	5	0	123	13	12	5	0	59	24.6	2.6	2.4	1.0	.0	11.8
Derrick Rose	PG	5	0	119	9	13	2	0	71	23.8	1.8	2.6	.4	.0	14.2
Gorgui Dieng	C	5	0	70	18	4	2	4	17	14.0	3.6	.8	.4	.8	3.4
Nemanja Bjelica	PF	5	0	47	15	3	3	0	23	9.4	3.0	.6	.6	.0	4.6
Tyus Jones	PG	4	0	55	9	8	1	0	4	13.8	2.3	2.0	.3	.0	1.0
Aaron Brooks	PG	2	0	3	0	0	0	0	4	1.5	.0	.0	.0	.0	2.0
Marcus Georges-Hunt	SG	2	0	3	1	0	0	0	0	1.5	.5	.0	.0	.0	.0

== Transactions ==
=== Trades ===
June 22, 2017	To Minnesota Timberwolves Jimmy Butler; Draft rights to Justin Patton	To Chicago Bulls Kris Dunn; Zach LaVine; Draft rights to Lauri Markkanen
June 29, 2017	To Minnesota Timberwolves 2018 first-round pick	To Utah Jazz Ricky Rubio

=== Free agents ===
==== Re-signed ====
Player	Signed
Shabazz Muhammad	1-year contract worth $1.6 million
Andrew Wiggins	5-year contract worth $148 million

==== Additions ====
Player	Signed	Former Team
Jeff Teague	3-year contract worth $57 million	Indiana Pacers
Taj Gibson	2-year contract worth $28 million	Oklahoma City Thunder
Jamal Crawford	2-year contract worth $8.9 million	Atlanta Hawks
Anthony Brown	Two-way contract	Erie BayHawks
Marcus Georges-Hunt	1-year contract worth $1.3 million	Orlando Magic
Aaron Brooks	1-year contract worth $2.1 million	Indiana Pacers

==== Subtractions ====
Player	Reason Left	New Team
Nikola Peković	Waived	
Jordan Hill	Waived	Nevada Desert Dogs
Omri Casspi	1-year contract worth $2.1 million	Golden State Warriors
Adreian Payne	Two-way contract	Orlando Magic
