= 2017–18 Denver Nuggets season =

NBA professional basketball team season

- Head coach: Michael Malone
- President: Tim Connelly
- General manager: Artūras Karnišovas
- Owners: Ann Walton Kroenke
- Arena: Pepsi Center

Results
- Record: 46–36 (.561)
- Place: Division: 5th (Northwest); Conference: 9th (Western)
- Playoff finish: Did not qualify
- Stats at Basketball Reference

Local media
- Television: Altitude Sports and Entertainment
- Radio: KKSE

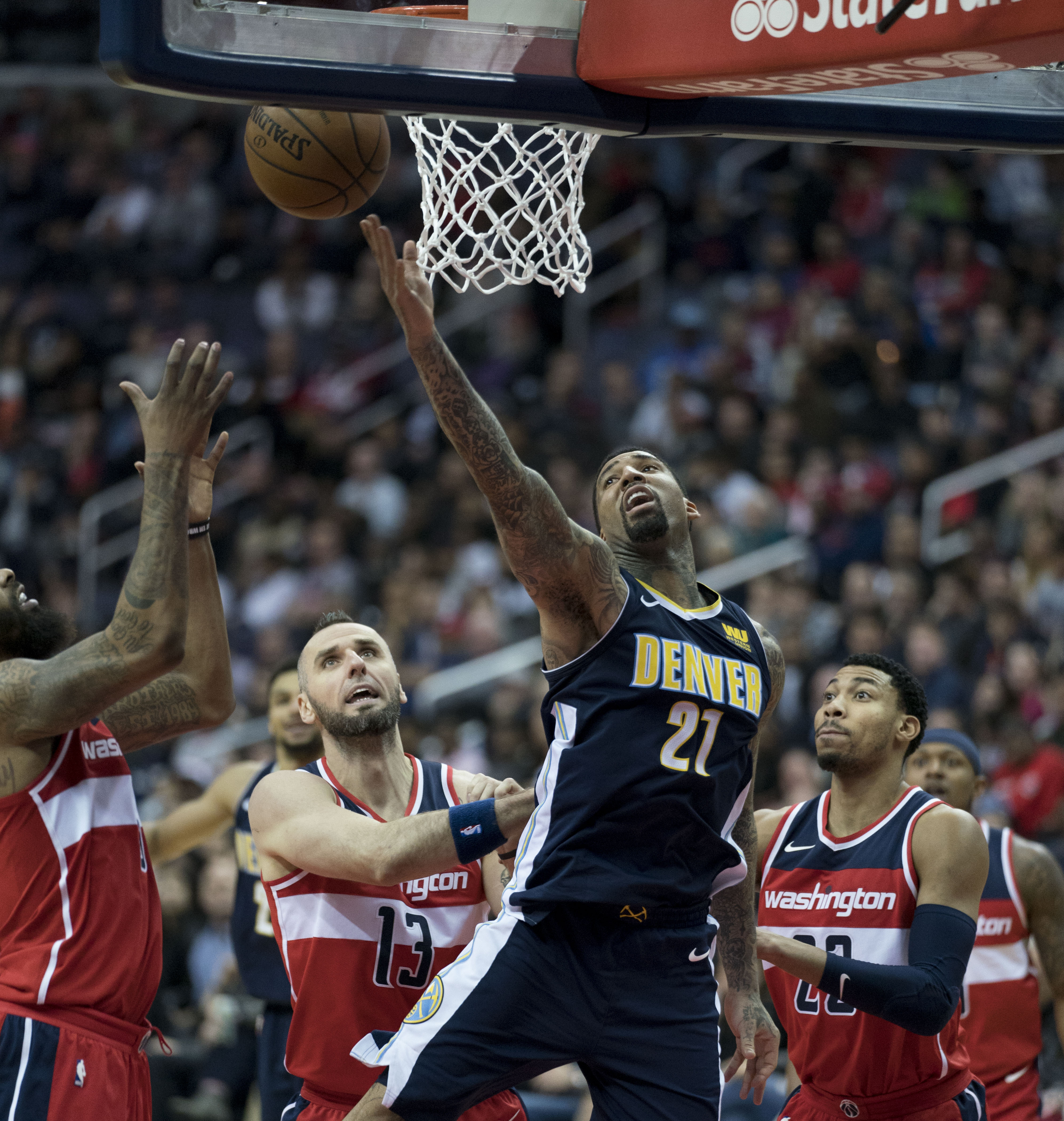
Wilson Chandler attempts a layup, Nuggets at Wizards, March 23, 2018

The 2017–18 Denver Nuggets season was the 42nd season of the franchise in the National Basketball Association (NBA). On June 15, 2017, the Nuggets officially promoted both Artūras Karnišovas and Tim Connelly to become the team's newest general manager and president of basketball operations respectively. On December 2, 2017, the Nuggets would retire Fat Lever's jersey number 12 during their 115–100 win over the Los Angeles Lakers. Despite compiling their first winning season since 2013, they missed the playoffs for the fifth straight season after losing to the Minnesota Timberwolves in a win-or-go-home situation in the regular season finale, also ending the Timberwolves' 14-year playoff drought.

As of the 2025 season, this remains the last season they didn't make the playoffs.

== Draft ==
| Round | Pick | Player | Position | Nationality | College / Club |
|---|---|---|---|---|---|
| 1 | 13 | Donovan Mitchell | SG | United States | Louisville |
| 2 | 49 | Vlatko Čančar | SF | Slovenia | KK Mega Leks |
| 2 | 51 | Monté Morris | PG | United States | Iowa State |

The Nuggets entered the draft with one first-round selection and two second-round selection, which were acquired via trade. They had traded their 2019 second-round pick to the Houston Rockets back in 2015. They used their 13th pick to draft future All-Star Donovan Mitchell, but soon traded his rights to the Utah Jazz for Trey Lyles and the rights to the 24th pick Tyler Lydon.

== Roster ==
2017–18 Denver Nuggets roster
Players

| Pos. | No. | Player | Height | Weight | DOB | From |
|---|---|---|---|---|---|---|
| F | 00 | Darrell Arthur | 6 ft 9 in (2.06 m) | 235 lb (107 kg) | 1988–03–25 | Kansas |
| G | 5 | Will Barton | 6 ft 6 in (1.98 m) | 190 lb (86 kg) | 1991–01–06 | Memphis |
| G | 25 | Malik Beasley | 6 ft 5 in (1.96 m) | 196 lb (89 kg) | 1996–11–26 | Florida State |
| F | 21 | Wilson Chandler | 6 ft 8 in (2.03 m) | 225 lb (102 kg) | 1987–05–10 | DePaul |
| F | 3 | Torrey Craig (TW) | 6 ft 7 in (2.01 m) | 215 lb (98 kg) | 1990–12–19 | USC Upstate |
| F | 35 | Kenneth Faried | 6 ft 8 in (2.03 m) | 228 lb (103 kg) | 1989–11–19 | Morehead State |
| G | 34 | Devin Harris | 6 ft 3 in (1.91 m) | 185 lb (84 kg) | 1983–02–27 | Wisconsin |
| G | 14 | Gary Harris | 6 ft 4 in (1.93 m) | 210 lb (95 kg) | 1994–09–14 | Michigan State |
| F | 41 | Juan Hernangómez | 6 ft 9 in (2.06 m) | 230 lb (104 kg) | 1995–09–28 | Spain |
| F | 22 | Richard Jefferson | 6 ft 7 in (2.01 m) | 233 lb (106 kg) | 1980–06–21 | Arizona |
| C | 15 | Nikola Jokić | 7 ft 0 in (2.13 m) | 250 lb (113 kg) | 1995–02–19 | Serbia |
| F | 20 | Tyler Lydon | 6 ft 9 in (2.06 m) | 220 lb (100 kg) | 1996–04–09 | Syracuse |
| F | 7 | Trey Lyles | 6 ft 10 in (2.08 m) | 234 lb (106 kg) | 1995–11–05 | Kentucky |
| F | 4 | Paul Millsap | 6 ft 8 in (2.03 m) | 256 lb (116 kg) | 1985–02–10 | Louisiana Tech |
| G | 11 | Monté Morris (TW) | 6 ft 3 in (1.91 m) | 175 lb (79 kg) | 1995–06–27 | Iowa State |
| G | 27 | Jamal Murray | 6 ft 4 in (1.93 m) | 207 lb (94 kg) | 1997–02–23 | Kentucky |
| C | 24 | Mason Plumlee | 6 ft 11 in (2.11 m) | 255 lb (116 kg) | 1990–03–05 | Duke |

Coaches
Head coach
- Michael Malone
Assistant(s)
- David Adelman
- Ryan Bowen
- Jordi Fernández
- Chuck Hayes
- Micah Nori
- Wes Unseld, Jr.
- Bob Weiss
- John Beckett (player development)
- Stephen Graham (player development)
- Ognjen Stojaković (player development)

Legend
- (DP) Unsigned draft pick
- (FA) Free agent
- (S) Suspended
- (GL) On assignment to G League
- (TW) Two-way affiliate player
- Injured

Roster
Updated: 2018–02–08

== Standings ==
=== Division ===
| Northwest Division | W | L | PCT | GB | Home | Road | Div | GP |
|---|---|---|---|---|---|---|---|---|
| y – Portland Trail Blazers | 49 | 33 | .598 | – | 28‍–‍13 | 21‍–‍20 | 9–7 | 82 |
| x – Oklahoma City Thunder | 48 | 34 | .585 | 1.0 | 27‍–‍14 | 21‍–‍20 | 5–11 | 82 |
| x – Utah Jazz | 48 | 34 | .585 | 1.0 | 28‍–‍13 | 20‍–‍21 | 7–9 | 82 |
| x – Minnesota Timberwolves | 47 | 35 | .573 | 2.0 | 30‍–‍11 | 17‍–‍24 | 10–6 | 82 |
| Denver Nuggets | 46 | 36 | .561 | 3.0 | 31‍–‍10 | 15‍–‍26 | 9–7 | 82 |

=== Conference ===
Western Conference
| # | Team | W | L | PCT | GB | GP |
|---|---|---|---|---|---|---|
| 1 | z – Houston Rockets * | 65 | 17 | .793 | – | 82 |
| 2 | y – Golden State Warriors * | 58 | 24 | .707 | 7.0 | 82 |
| 3 | y – Portland Trail Blazers * | 49 | 33 | .598 | 16.0 | 82 |
| 4 | x – Oklahoma City Thunder | 48 | 34 | .585 | 17.0 | 82 |
| 5 | x – Utah Jazz | 48 | 34 | .585 | 17.0 | 82 |
| 6 | x – New Orleans Pelicans | 48 | 34 | .585 | 17.0 | 82 |
| 7 | x – San Antonio Spurs | 47 | 35 | .573 | 18.0 | 82 |
| 8 | x – Minnesota Timberwolves | 47 | 35 | .573 | 18.0 | 82 |
| 9 | Denver Nuggets | 46 | 36 | .561 | 19.0 | 82 |
| 10 | Los Angeles Clippers | 42 | 40 | .512 | 23.0 | 82 |
| 11 | Los Angeles Lakers | 35 | 47 | .427 | 30.0 | 82 |
| 12 | Sacramento Kings | 27 | 55 | .329 | 38.0 | 82 |
| 13 | Dallas Mavericks | 24 | 58 | .293 | 41.0 | 82 |
| 14 | Memphis Grizzlies | 22 | 60 | .268 | 43.0 | 82 |
| 15 | Phoenix Suns | 21 | 61 | .256 | 44.0 | 82 |

== Game log ==
=== Preseason ===
2017 pre-season game log
Total: 3–2 (Home: 0–1; Road: 3–1)
Pre-season: 3–2 (home: 0–1; road: 3–1)

| Game | Date | Team | Score | High points | High rebounds | High assists | Location Attendance | Record |
|---|---|---|---|---|---|---|---|---|
| 1 | September 30 | @ Golden State | W 108–102 | Paul Millsap (22) | Paul Millsap (11) | Emmanuel Mudiay (6) | Oracle Arena; 19,596 | 1–0 |
| 2 | October 2 | @ LA Lakers | W 113–107 | Gary Harris (25) | Juan Hernangómez (6) | Barton, Mudiay (4) | Staples Center; 17,218 | 2–0 |
| 3 | October 4 | @ LA Lakers | W 122–104 | Kenneth Faried (20) | Mason Plumlee (16) | Mason Plumlee (7) | Citizens Business Bank Arena; 17,000 | 3–0 |
| 4 | October 8 | @ San Antonio | L 100–122 | Nikola Jokić (19) | Jokić, Millsap (7) | Jameer Nelson (5) | AT&T Center; 17,832 | 3–1 |
| 5 | October 10 | Oklahoma City | L 86–96 | Will Barton (26) | Nikola Jokić (11) | Murray, Nelson (4) | Pepsi Center; N/A | 3–2 |

2017–18 season schedule

=== Regular season ===
2017–18 game log
Total: 46–36 (Home: 31–10; Road: 15–26)
October: 3–4 (home: 1–1; road: 2–3)

| Game | Date | Team | Score | High points | High rebounds | High assists | Location Attendance | Record |
|---|---|---|---|---|---|---|---|---|
| 1 | October 18 | @ Utah | L 96–106 | Paul Millsap (19) | Nikola Jokić (12) | Nikola Jokić (8) | Vivint Smart Home Arena; 17,588 | 0–1 |
| 2 | October 21 | Sacramento | W 96–79 | Faried, Millsap (18) | Wilson Chandler (12) | Nikola Jokić (7) | Pepsi Center; 19,520 | 1–1 |
| 3 | October 23 | Washington | L 104–109 | Nikola Jokić (29) | Nikola Jokić (9) | Harris, Murray (6) | Pepsi Center; 14,294 | 1–2 |
| 4 | October 25 | @ Charlotte | L 93–110 | Harris, Jokić (18) | Nikola Jokić (11) | Will Barton (6) | Spectrum Center; 14,253 | 1–3 |
| 5 | October 27 | @ Atlanta | W 105–100 | Barton, Harris, Jokić (18) | Nikola Jokić (15) | Mason Plumlee (6) | Philips Arena; 16,220 | 2–3 |
| 6 | October 29 | @ Brooklyn | W 124–111 | Nikola Jokić (21) | Nikola Jokić (14) | Millsap, Mudiay, Murray (5) | Barclays Center; 14,854 | 3–3 |
| 7 | October 30 | @ NY Knicks | L 110–116 | Nikola Jokić (28) | Paul Millsap (10) | Chandler, Millsap (4) | Madison Square Garden; 19,812 | 3–4 |

November: 9–5 (home: 8–1; road: 1–4)

| Game | Date | Team | Score | High points | High rebounds | High assists | Location Attendance | Record |
|---|---|---|---|---|---|---|---|---|
| 8 | November 1 | Toronto | W 129–111 | Jamal Murray (24) | Nikola Jokić (16) | Nikola Jokić (10) | Pepsi Center; 14,072 | 4–4 |
| 9 | November 3 | Miami | W 95–94 | Paul Millsap (27) | Nikola Jokić (14) | Paul Millsap (5) | Pepsi Center; 15,317 | 5–4 |
| 10 | November 4 | Golden State | L 108–127 | Will Barton (21) | Will Barton (8) | Emmanuel Mudiay (7) | Pepsi Center; 19,711 | 5–5 |
| 11 | November 7 | Brooklyn | W 112–104 | Nikola Jokić (41) | Nikola Jokić (12) | Harris & Jokić (5) | Pepsi Center; 14,058 | 6–5 |
| 12 | November 9 | Oklahoma City | W 102–94 | Emmanuel Mudiay (21) | Nikola Jokić (11) | Millsap & Mudiay (5) | Pepsi Center; 19,520 | 7–5 |
| 13 | November 11 | Orlando | W 125–107 | Jamal Murray (32) | Nikola Jokić (17) | Nikola Jokić (8) | Pepsi Center; 16,688 | 8–5 |
| 14 | November 13 | @ Portland | L 82–99 | Paul Millsap (18) | Wilson Chandler (7) | Wilson Chandler (6) | Moda Center; 18,895 | 8–6 |
| 15 | November 17 | New Orleans | W 146–114 | Jamal Murray (31) | Chandler, Jokić (11) | Paul Millsap (7) | Pepsi Center; 16,816 | 9–6 |
| 16 | November 19 | @ LA Lakers | L 109–127 | Gary Harris (20) | Trey Lyles (8) | Emmanuel Mudiay (7) | Staples Center; 18,997 | 9–7 |
| 17 | November 20 | @ Sacramento | W 114–98 | Will Barton (25) | Nikola Jokić (14) | Will Barton (5) | Golden 1 Center; 17,583 | 10–7 |
| 18 | November 22 | @ Houston | L 95–125 | Will Barton (20) | Mason Plumlee (8) | Barton, Jokić, Lyles, Mudiay, Murray (3) | Toyota Center; 18,055 | 10–8 |
| 19 | November 24 | Memphis | W 104–92 | Nikola Jokić (28) | Nikola Jokić (13) | Nikola Jokić (8) | Pepsi Center; 16,736 | 11–8 |
| 20 | November 28 | @ Utah | L 77–106 | Gary Harris (18) | Juan Hernangómez (10) | Nikola Jokić (6) | Vivint Smart Home Arena; 16,790 | 11–9 |
| 21 | November 30 | Chicago | W 111–110 | Will Barton (37) | Kenneth Faried (13) | Nikola Jokić (4) | Pepsi Center; 15,156 | 12–9 |

December: 7–8 (home: 3–2; road: 4–6)

| Game | Date | Team | Score | High points | High rebounds | High assists | Location Attendance | Record |
|---|---|---|---|---|---|---|---|---|
| 22 | December 2 | LA Lakers | W 115–100 | Jamal Murray (28) | Kenneth Faried (8) | Harris, Plumlee (6) | Pepsi Center; 19,520 | 13–9 |
| 23 | December 4 | @ Dallas | L 105–122 | Will Barton (23) | Kenneth Faried (11) | Will Barton (6) | American Airlines Center; 19,419 | 13–10 |
| 24 | December 6 | @ New Orleans | L 114–123 | Gary Harris (24) | Trey Lyles (11) | Harris, Lyles (4) | Smoothie King Center; 15,353 | 13–11 |
| 25 | December 8 | @ Orlando | W 103–89 | Kenneth Faried (20) | Kenneth Faried (10) | Barton, Mudiay (5) | Amway Center; 16,024 | 14–11 |
| 26 | December 10 | @ Indiana | L 116–126 (OT) | Trey Lyles (25) | Kenneth Faried (11) | Will Barton (9) | Bankers Life Fieldhouse; 14,587 | 14–12 |
| 27 | December 12 | @ Detroit | W 103–84 | Jamal Murray (28) | Mason Plumlee (13) | Will Barton (10) | Little Caesars Arena; 15,494 | 15–12 |
| 28 | December 13 | @ Boston | L 118–124 | Gary Harris (36) | Faried, Murray (10) | Gary Harris (6) | TD Garden; 18,624 | 15–13 |
| 29 | December 15 | New Orleans | W 117–111 (OT) | Gary Harris (21) | Nikola Jokić (11) | Will Barton (6) | Pepsi Center; 17,584 | 16–13 |
| 30 | December 18 | @ Oklahoma City | L 94–95 | Gary Harris (17) | Wilson Chandler (10) | Will Barton (7) | Chesapeake Energy Arena; 18,203 | 16–14 |
| 31 | December 20 | Minnesota | L 104–112 | Jamal Murray (30) | Chandler, Plumlee (10) | Chandler, Plumlee (6) | Pepsi Center; 17,002 | 16–15 |
| 32 | December 22 | @ Portland | W 102–85 | Nikola Jokić (27) | Wilson Chandler (11) | Nikola Jokić (6) | Moda Center; 19,473 | 17–15 |
| 33 | December 23 | @ Golden State | W 96–81 | Gary Harris (19) | Chandler, Jokić (9) | Will Barton (7) | Oracle Arena; 19,596 | 18–15 |
| 34 | December 26 | Utah | W 107–83 | Jamal Murray (22) | Murray, Lyles, Plumlee (8) | Barton, Harris, Jokić (5) | Pepsi Center; 17,104 | 19–15 |
| 35 | December 27 | @ Minnesota | L 125–128 (OT) | Nikola Jokić (22) | Trey Lyles (10) | Jamal Murray (8) | Target Center; 18,978 | 19–16 |
| 36 | December 30 | Philadelphia | L 102–107 | Jamal Murray (31) | Nikola Jokić (13) | Nikola Jokić (6) | Pepsi Center; 19,599 | 19–17 |

January: 7–8 (home: 7–3; road: 0–5)

| Game | Date | Team | Score | High points | High rebounds | High assists | Location Attendance | Record |
|---|---|---|---|---|---|---|---|---|
| 37 | January 3 | Phoenix | W 134–111 | Gary Harris (36) | Trey Lyles (11) | Nikola Jokić (8) | Pepsi Center; 14,079 | 20–17 |
| 38 | January 5 | Utah | W 99–91 | Lyles, Murray (26) | Nikola Jokić (10) | Will Barton (8) | Pepsi Center; 15,557 | 21–17 |
| 39 | January 6 | @ Sacramento | L 98–106 | Trey Lyles (19) | Trey Lyles (9) | Nikola Jokić (10) | Golden 1 Center; 17,583 | 21–18 |
| 40 | January 8 | @ Golden State | L 114–124 | Harris, Jokić (22) | Nikola Jokić (12) | Nikola Jokić (11) | Oracle Arena; 19,596 | 21–19 |
| 41 | January 10 | Atlanta | L 97–110 | Gary Harris (25) | Nikola Jokić (12) | Nikola Jokić (7) | Pepsi Center; 14,182 | 21–20 |
| 42 | January 12 | Memphis | W 87–78 | Will Barton (17) | Mason Plumlee (9) | Barton, Jokić, Murray, Plumlee (3) | Pepsi Center; 15,607 | 22–20 |
| 43 | January 13 | @ San Antonio | L 80–112 | Nikola Jokić (23) | Nikola Jokić (9) | Nikola Jokić (7) | AT&T Center; 18,418 | 22–21 |
| 44 | January 16 | Dallas | W 105–102 | Nikola Jokić (29) | Nikola Jokić (18) | Nikola Jokić (7) | Pepsi Center; 14,097 | 23–21 |
| 45 | January 17 | @ L.A. Clippers | L 104–109 | Gary Harris (19) | Mason Plumlee (14) | Will Barton (6) | Staples Center; 15,043 | 23–22 |
| 46 | January 19 | Phoenix | L 100–108 | Jamal Murray (30) | Nikola Jokić (17) | Nikola Jokić (5) | Pepsi Center; 15,732 | 23–23 |
| 47 | January 22 | Portland | W 104–101 | Jamal Murray (38) | Nikola Jokić (12) | Jamal Murray (6) | Pepsi Center; 14,474 | 24–23 |
| 48 | January 25 | New York | W 130–118 | Gary Harris (23) | Nikola Jokić (7) | Nikola Jokić (10) | Pepsi Center; 15,482 | 25–23 |
| 49 | January 27 | Dallas | W 91–89 | Gary Harris (24) | Nikola Jokić (16) | Nikola Jokić (11) | Pepsi Center; 19,520 | 26–23 |
| 50 | January 29 | Boston | L 110–111 | Nikola Jokić (24) | Nikola Jokić (11) | Jamal Murray (8) | Pepsi Center; 19,520 | 26–24 |
| 51 | January 30 | @ San Antonio | L 104–106 | Jamal Murray (18) | Jokić, Lyles (7) | Nikola Jokić (8) | AT&T Center; 18,418 | 26–25 |

February: 7–3 (home: 5–2; road: 2–1)

| Game | Date | Team | Score | High points | High rebounds | High assists | Location Attendance | Record |
|---|---|---|---|---|---|---|---|---|
| 52 | February 1 | Oklahoma City | W 127–124 | Jamal Murray (33) | Nikola Jokić (13) | Nikola Jokić (14) | Pepsi Center; 18,407 | 27–25 |
| 53 | February 3 | Golden State | W 115–108 | Will Barton (25) | Trey Lyles (10) | Nikola Jokić (5) | Pepsi Center; 20,103 | 28–25 |
| 54 | February 5 | Charlotte | W 121–104 | Gary Harris (27) | Nikola Jokić (16) | Jokic, Murray (7) | Pepsi Center; 14,410 | 29–25 |
| 55 | February 9 | @ Houston | L 104–130 | Trey Lyles (24) | Nikola Jokić (7) | Monte Morris (6) | Toyota Center; 18,055 | 29–26 |
| 56 | February 10 | @ Phoenix | W 123–113 | Wilson Chandler (26) | Nikola Jokić (9) | Nikola Jokić (8) | Talking Stick Resort Arena; 16,325 | 30–26 |
| 57 | February 13 | San Antonio | W 117–109 | Nikola Jokić (23) | Nikola Jokić (13) | Nikola Jokić (11) | Pepsi Center; 17,623 | 31–26 |
| 58 | February 15 | @ Milwaukee | W 134–123 | Nikola Jokić (30) | Nikola Jokić (15) | Nikola Jokić (17) | Bradley Center; 15,486 | 32–26 |
All-Star Break
| 59 | February 23 | San Antonio | W 122–119 | Nikola Jokić (28) | Wilson Chandler (16) | Nikola Jokić (11) | Pepsi Center; 20,027 | 33–26 |
| 60 | February 25 | Houston | L 114–119 | Will Barton (25) | Nikola Jokić (14) | Nikola Jokić (8) | Pepsi Center; 20,044 | 33–27 |
| 61 | February 27 | LA Clippers | L 120–122 | Gary Harris (23) | Wilson Chandler (8) | Wilson Chandler (6) | Pepsi Center; 15,004 | 33–28 |

March: 8–7 (home: 3–1; road: 5–6)

| Game | Date | Team | Score | High points | High rebounds | High assists | Location Attendance | Record |
|---|---|---|---|---|---|---|---|---|
| 62 | March 2 | @ Memphis | W 108–102 | Gary Harris (26) | Nikola Jokić (9) | Nikola Jokić (5) | FedExForum; 16,421 | 34–28 |
| 63 | March 3 | @ Cleveland | W 126–117 | Gary Harris (32) | Will Barton (8) | Nikola Jokić (8) | Quicken Loans Arena; 20.562 | 35–28 |
| 64 | March 6 | @ Dallas | L 107–118 | Wilson Chandler (21) | Nikola Jokić (9) | Will Barton (7) | American Airlines Center; 19,504 | 35–29 |
| 65 | March 7 | Cleveland | L 108–113 | Nikola Jokić (36) | Nikola Jokić (13) | Nikola Jokić (6) | Pepsi Center; 20,062 | 35–30 |
| 66 | March 9 | LA Lakers | W 125–116 | Jamal Murray (22) | Jokić, Millsap (6) | Jamal Murray (8) | Pepsi Center; 19,807 | 36–30 |
| 67 | March 11 | Sacramento | W 130–104 | Gary Harris (21) | Nikola Jokić (11) | Nikola Jokić (10) | Pepsi Center; 19,520 | 37–30 |
| 68 | March 13 | @ LA Lakers | L 103–112 | Wilson Chandler (26) | Wilson Chandler (10) | Jokić, Plumlee (5) | Staples Center; 18,997 | 37–31 |
| 69 | March 15 | Detroit | W 120–113 | Jamal Murray (26) | Nikola Jokić (12) | Nikola Jokić (10) | Pepsi Center; 18,697 | 38–31 |
| 70 | March 17 | @ Memphis | L 94–101 | Nikola Jokić (17) | Nikola Jokić (12) | Murray, Plumlee (3) | FedExForum; 16,501 | 38–32 |
| 71 | March 19 | @ Miami | L 141–149 (2OT) | Nikola Jokić (34) | Nikola Jokić (14) | Devin Harris (9) | American Airlines Arena; 19,600 | 38–33 |
| 72 | March 21 | @ Chicago | W 135–102 | Paul Millsap (22) | Paul Millsap (8) | Jamal Murray (7) | United Center; 20,671 | 39–33 |
| 73 | March 23 | @ Washington | W 108–100 | Jokić, Murray (25) | Nikola Jokić (8) | Jokić, Millsap (5) | Capital One Arena; 19,016 | 40–33 |
| 74 | March 26 | @ Philadelphia | L 104–123 | Will Barton (25) | Paul Millsap (9) | Wilson Chandler (7) | Wells Fargo Center; 20,585 | 40–34 |
| 75 | March 27 | @ Toronto | L 110–114 | Nikola Jokić (29) | Nikola Jokić (16) | Nikola Jokić (8) | Air Canada Centre; 19,800 | 40–35 |
| 76 | March 30 | @ Oklahoma City | W 126–125 (OT) | Paul Millsap (36) | Nikola Jokić (16) | Nikola Jokić (6) | Chesapeake Energy Arena; 18,203 | 41–35 |

April: 5–1 (home: 4–0; road: 1–1)

| Game | Date | Team | Score | High points | High rebounds | High assists | Location Attendance | Record |
|---|---|---|---|---|---|---|---|---|
| 77 | April 1 | Milwaukee | W 128–125 (OT) | Nikola Jokić (35) | Millsap, Jokic (13) | Jamal Murray (7) | Pepsi Center; 19,520 | 42–35 |
| 78 | April 3 | Indiana | W 107–104 | Nikola Jokić (30) | Will Barton (10) | Jokić, Murray (7) | Pepsi Center; 14,743 | 43–35 |
| 79 | April 5 | Minnesota | W 100–96 | Jamal Murray (22) | Nikola Jokić (14) | Nikola Jokić (9) | Pepsi Center; 16,415 | 44–35 |
| 80 | April 7 | @ LA Clippers | W 134–115 | Will Barton (31) | Nikola Jokić (11) | Nikola Jokić (11) | Staples Center; 16,166 | 45–35 |
| 81 | April 9 | Portland | W 88–82 | Will Barton (22) | Nikola Jokić (20) | Nikola Jokić (11) | Pepsi Center; 17,467 | 46–35 |
| 82 | April 11 | @ Minnesota | L 106–112 (OT) | Nikola Jokić (35) | Nikola Jokić (10) | Jamal Murray (6) | Target Center; 18,978 | 46–36 |

2017–18 season schedule

== Player statistics ==
Legend
| GP | Games played | GS | Games started | MPG | Minutes per game |
| FG% | Field-goal percentage | 3P% | 3-point field-goal percentage | FT% | Free-throw percentage |
| RPG | Rebounds per game | APG | Assists per game | SPG | Steals per game |
| BPG | Blocks per game | PPG | Points per game |

=== Regular season ===
| Player | GP | GS | MPG | FG% | 3P% | FT% | RPG | APG | SPG | BPG | PPG |
|---|---|---|---|---|---|---|---|---|---|---|---|
| Darrell Arthur | 19 | 1 | 7.4 | .468 | .348 | .667 | .8 | .5 | .4 | .2 | 2.8 |
| Will Barton | 81 | 40 | 33.1 | .452 | .370 | .805 | 5.0 | 4.1 | 1.0 | .6 | 15.7 |
| Malik Beasley | 62 | 0 | 9.4 | .410 | .341 | .667 | 1.1 | .5 | .2 | .1 | 3.2 |
| Wilson Chandler | 74 | 71 | 31.7 | .445 | .358 | .772 | 5.4 | 2.2 | .6 | .5 | 10.0 |
| Torrey Craig | 39 | 5 | 16.1 | .453 | .293 | .629 | 3.3 | .6 | .3 | .4 | 4.2 |
| Kenneth Faried | 32 | 7 | 14.4 | .514 | .000 | .706 | 4.8 | .6 | .4 | .4 | 5.9 |
| Devin Harris^{a} | 27 | 0 | 19.7 | .406 | .343 | .845 | 1.6 | 2.5 | .5 | .1 | 8.2 |
| Gary Harris | 67 | 65 | 34.4 | .485 | .396 | .827 | 2.6 | 2.9 | 1.8 | .2 | 17.5 |
| Juan Hernangómez | 25 | 3 | 11.1 | .387 | .280 | .833 | 2.2 | .5 | .2 | .1 | 3.3 |
| Richard Jefferson | 20 | 0 | 8.2 | .444 | .286 | .571 | .9 | .8 | .1 | .1 | 1.5 |
| Nikola Jokić | 75 | 73 | 32.6 | .499 | .396 | .850 | 10.7 | 6.1 | 1.2 | .8 | 18.5 |
| Tyler Lydon | 1 | 0 | 2.0 | .000 | .000 | .000 | .0 | .0 | .0 | .0 | .0 |
| Trey Lyles | 73 | 2 | 19.1 | .491 | .381 | .697 | 4.8 | 1.2 | .4 | .5 | 9.9 |
| Paul Millsap | 38 | 37 | 30.1 | .464 | .345 | .696 | 6.4 | 2.7 | 1.0 | 1.2 | 14.6 |
| Monté Morris | 3 | 0 | 8.3 | .667 | .000 | 1.000 | .7 | 2.3 | 1.0 | .0 | 3.3 |
| Emmanuel Mudiay^{a} | 42 | 0 | 17.9 | .401 | .373 | .808 | 2.2 | 2.9 | .5 | .1 | 8.5 |
| Jamal Murray | 81 | 80 | 31.7 | .451 | .378 | .905 | 3.7 | 3.4 | 1.0 | .3 | 16.7 |
| Mason Plumlee | 74 | 26 | 19.4 | .601 | .000 | .456 | 5.4 | 1.9 | .7 | 1.1 | 7.1 |

^{a} Statistics with the Denver Nuggets

== Transactions ==
=== Trades ===
| June 22, 2017 | To Denver Nuggets Trey Lyles; Draft rights to Tyler Lydon (pick 24) | to Utah Jazz Draft rights to Donovan Mitchell (pick 13) |
| July 6, 2017 | To Denver Nuggets 2019 Second Round Pick (from Atlanta) | To Los Angeles Clippers Danilo Gallinari |
| July 6, 2017 | To Atlanta Hawks Jamal Crawford; Diamond Stone; 2018 First Round Pick (from Los Angeles) |
| February 8, 2018 | To Denver Nuggets Devin Harris; 2018 Second Round Pick (from Portland via Denver) | To New York Knicks Emmanuel Mudiay |
| February 8, 2018 | To Dallas Mavericks Doug McDermott; 2018 Second Round Pick (from L.A. Clippers via New York) |

=== Contracts ===
==== Re-signed ====
| Player | Signed |
|---|---|
| Mason Plumlee | September 20, 2017 |

==== Additions ====
| Player | Signed | Former Team |
|---|---|---|
| Paul Millsap | July 13, 2017 | Atlanta Hawks |
| Torrey Craig | Two-way contract | (Australia) Gold Coast Rollers |
| Monté Morris^{^} | Two-way contract | Iowa State Cyclones |

- ^{^} Team's second-round draft pick this year.

==== Subtractions ====
| Player | Reason Left | New Team |
|---|---|---|
| Mike Miller | Waived | |
