= Steve Hetzel =

American basketball coach

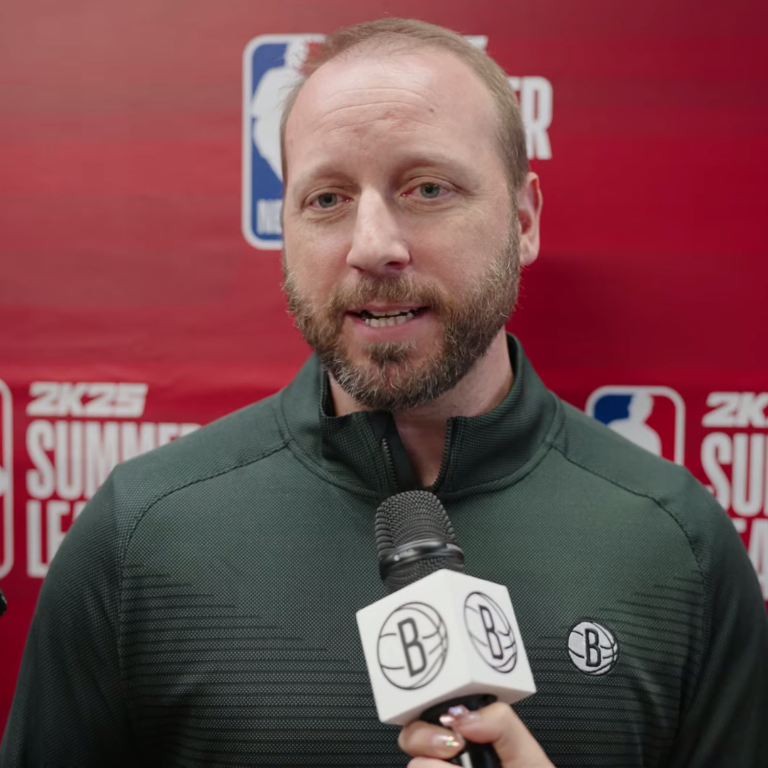
- Hetzel during the 2024 NBA Summer League

Brooklyn Nets
- Position: Assistant coach
- League: NBA

Personal information
- Born: Allen Park, Michigan, U.S.

Career information
- College: Michigan State
- Coaching career: 2009–present

Career history

Coaching
- 2009–2013: Detroit Pistons (player development coach)
- 2013–2014: Canton Charge
- 2014–2018: Charlotte Hornets (assistant)
- 2018–2021: Orlando Magic (assistant)
- 2021–2024: Portland Trail Blazers (assistant)
- 2024–present: Brooklyn Nets (assistant)

Steve Hetzel is an American professional basketball coach who is an assistant coach for the Brooklyn Nets of the National Basketball Association (NBA).

== Coaching career ==
Hetzel began his career in the NBA as an assistant video coordinator for the San Antonio Spurs during the 2005–2006 season under head coach Gregg Popovich. He later worked as the video coordinator for the Cleveland Cavaliers for three seasons from 2006 to 2009 under head coach Mike Brown.

Hetzel earned his first coaching position with the Detroit Pistons in 2009, spending four seasons as a player development coach until 2013. As a player development coach in Detroit, Hetzel was responsible for creating player progression plans and monitoring player growth.

In 2013, Hetzel became the head coach of the Canton Charge of the NBA G-League, the G-League affiliate of the Cleveland Cavaliers. He replaced D-League coach of the year Alex Jensen, who left to become a development coach for the Utah Jazz. Hetzel served one season as head coach of the Charge leading the team to a 28–22 record in his lone season.

Hetzel earned his first assistant coaching job in the NBA in 2014, being hired by the Charlotte Hornets as an assistant coach under head coach Steve Clifford. He worked with the Hornets until 2018 when he was hired by the Orlando Magic where he worked from 2018 until 2021.

In 2022, Hetzel coached the Portland Trail Blazers summer league team to the 2022 NBA Summer League championship. He was named an assistant coach for the Trail Blazers under head coach Chauncey Billups for the 2021–22 season and spent three seasons in Portland.

On April 21, 2024, it was reported that Hetzel would be joining the Brooklyn Nets as an assistant coach under new head coach Jordi Fernández. The hiring was officially announced by the Nets on May 31, 2024.

== Personal life ==
Hetzel is a native of Allen Park, Michigan. Hetzel graduated from Michigan State University in 2005. At Michigan State, Hetzel majored in kinesiology and was a student manager for the Michigan State Spartans under head coach Tom Izzo from 2003 to 2005. He is married to his wife Anne and has three children, Aden, Selah, and Jackie.
