= 2017–18 Detroit Pistons season =

- Head coach: Stan Van Gundy
- President: Stan Van Gundy
- General manager: Jeff Bower
- Owner: Tom Gores
- Arena: Little Caesars Arena

Results
- Record: 39–43 (.476)
- Place: Division: 4th (Central); Conference: 9th (Eastern)
- Playoff finish: Did not qualify
- Stats at Basketball Reference

Local media
- Television: Fox Sports Detroit
- Radio: WXYT

The 2017–18 Detroit Pistons season was the 77th season of the franchise, the 70th in the National Basketball Association (NBA), and the first in Midtown Detroit. The Pistons moved from The Palace of Auburn Hills to the new Little Caesars Arena before the start of the season. This was the first season where the Pistons have played in Detroit on a regular basis since 1978. This would also be the last season with Stan Van Gundy being both the team's head coach and President of Basketball Operations.

== Draft picks ==
Round	Pick	Player	Position	Nationality	College/Team
1	12	Luke Kennard	SG	United States	Duke

== Roster ==
2017–18 Detroit Pistons roster
Players

Pos.	No.	Player	Height	Weight	DOB	From
G/F	25	Reggie Bullock	6 ft 7 in (2.01 m)	205 lb (93 kg)	1991–03–16	North Carolina
G	20	Dwight Buycks	6 ft 3 in (1.91 m)	190 lb (86 kg)	1989–03–06	Marquette
C	0	Andre Drummond	6 ft 11 in (2.11 m)	279 lb (127 kg)	1993–08–10	Connecticut
F	8	Henry Ellenson	6 ft 11 in (2.11 m)	245 lb (111 kg)	1997–01–13	Marquette
F	33	James Ennis	6 ft 7 in (2.01 m)	210 lb (95 kg)	1990–07–01	Long Beach State
G	22	Kay Felder (TW)	5 ft 9 in (1.75 m)	176 lb (80 kg)	1995–03–29	Oakland
G	9	Langston Galloway	6 ft 2 in (1.88 m)	200 lb (91 kg)	1991–12–09	Saint Joseph's
F	23	Blake Griffin	6 ft 10 in (2.08 m)	251 lb (114 kg)	1989–03–16	Oklahoma
F	38	Reggie Hearn (TW)	6 ft 5 in (1.96 m)	210 lb (95 kg)	1991–08–14	Northwestern
G	1	Reggie Jackson	6 ft 3 in (1.91 m)	208 lb (94 kg)	1990–04–16	Boston College
F	7	Stanley Johnson	6 ft 7 in (2.01 m)	245 lb (111 kg)	1996–05–29	Arizona
G	5	Luke Kennard	6 ft 5 in (1.96 m)	200 lb (91 kg)	1996–06–24	Duke
F/C	30	Jon Leuer	6 ft 10 in (2.08 m)	228 lb (103 kg)	1989–05–14	Wisconsin
F/C	24	Eric Moreland	6 ft 10 in (2.08 m)	238 lb (108 kg)	1991–12–24	Oregon State
G	41	Jameer Nelson	6 ft 0 in (1.83 m)	190 lb (86 kg)	1982-02-09	Saint Joseph's
G	14	Ish Smith	6 ft 0 in (1.83 m)	175 lb (79 kg)	1988–07–05	Wake Forest
F	43	Anthony Tolliver	6 ft 8 in (2.03 m)	240 lb (109 kg)	1985–06–01	Creighton

Coaches
Head coach
- Stan Van Gundy
Assistant(s)
- Malik Allen
- Bob Beyer (Associate HC)
- Aaron Gray
- Tim Hardaway
- Charles Klask
- Rex Walters
- Otis Smith (Player Development)

Legend
- (DP) Unsigned draft pick
- (FA) Free agent
- (S) Suspended
- (GL) On assignment to G League affiliate
- (TW) Two-way affiliate player
- Injured

Roster
Updated: 2018–03–25

== Standings ==
=== Division ===
Central Division	W	L	PCT	GB	Home	Road	Div	GP
y – Cleveland Cavaliers	50	32	.610	–	29‍–‍12	21‍–‍20	11–5	82
x – Indiana Pacers	48	34	.585	2.0	27‍–‍14	21‍–‍20	10–6	82
x – Milwaukee Bucks	44	38	.537	6.0	25‍–‍16	19‍–‍22	6–10	82
Detroit Pistons	39	43	.476	11.0	25‍–‍16	14‍–‍27	9–7	82
Chicago Bulls	27	55	.329	23.0	17‍–‍24	10‍–‍31	4–12	82

=== Conference ===
Eastern Conference
#	Team	W	L	PCT	GB	GP
1	c – Toronto Raptors *	59	23	.720	–	82
2	x – Boston Celtics	55	27	.671	4.0	82
3	x – Philadelphia 76ers	52	30	.634	7.0	82
4	y – Cleveland Cavaliers *	50	32	.610	9.0	82
5	x – Indiana Pacers	48	34	.585	11.0	82
6	y – Miami Heat *	44	38	.537	15.0	82
7	x – Milwaukee Bucks	44	38	.537	15.0	82
8	x – Washington Wizards	43	39	.524	16.0	82
9	Detroit Pistons	39	43	.476	20.0	82
10	Charlotte Hornets	36	46	.439	23.0	82
11	New York Knicks	29	53	.354	30.0	82
12	Brooklyn Nets	28	54	.341	31.0	82
13	Chicago Bulls	27	55	.329	32.0	82
14	Orlando Magic	25	57	.305	34.0	82
15	Atlanta Hawks	24	58	.293	35.0	82

== Game log ==
=== Preseason ===
2017 pre-season game log
Total: 2–3 (Home: 2–1; Road: 0–2)
Pre-season: 2–3 (home: 2–1; road: 0–2)

Game	Date	Team	Score	High points	High rebounds	High assists	Location Attendance	Record
1	October 4	Charlotte	L 106–108	Andre Drummond (16)	Andre Drummond (15)	Ish Smith (7)	Little Caesars Arena; 13,882	0–1
2	October 6	Atlanta	W 109–87	Avery Bradley (18)	Eric Moreland (13)	Ish Smith (8)	Little Caesars Arena; 14,496	1–1
3	October 9	Indiana	W 107–97	Marjanović, Jackson & Smith (14)	Eric Moreland (7)	Ish Smith (9)	Little Caesars Arena; 12,721	2–1
4	October 10	@ Toronto	L 94–116	Ish Smith (22)	Andre Drummond (11)	Ish Smith (8)	Air Canada Centre; 16,893	2–2
4	October 13	@ Milwaukee	L 103–107	Avery Bradley (26)	Andre Drummond (22)	Andre Drummond (7)	BMO Harris Bradley Center; 9,528	2–3

=== Regular season ===
2017–18 game log
Total: 39–43 (Home: 25–16; Road: 14–27)
October: 5–3 (home: 2–1; road: 3–2)

Game	Date	Team	Score	High points	High rebounds	High assists	Location Attendance	Record
1	October 18	Charlotte	W 102–90	Tobias Harris (27)	Andre Drummond (12)	Reggie Jackson (8)	Little Caesars Arena; 20,491	1–0
2	October 20	@ Washington	L 111–115	Reggie Jackson (21)	Andre Drummond (12)	Reggie Jackson (5)	Verizon Center; 16,337	1–1
3	October 21	@ New York	W 111–107	Tobias Harris (31)	Andre Drummond (12)	Reggie Jackson (7)	Madison Square Garden; 19,812	2–1
4	October 23	Philadelphia	L 86–97	Reggie Jackson (16)	Andre Drummond (14)	Reggie Jackson (7)	Little Caesars Arena; 13,709	2–2
5	October 25	Minnesota	W 122–101	Tobias Harris (34)	Andre Drummond (15)	Ish Smith (13)	Little Caesars Arena; 13,790	3–2
6	October 28	@ L.A. Clippers	W 95–87	Drummond & Jackson (15)	Andre Drummond (17)	Reggie Jackson (7)	Staples Center; 17,247	4–2
7	October 29	@ Golden State	W 115–107	Avery Bradley (23)	Andre Drummond (18)	Drummond & Jackson (5)	Oracle Arena; 19,596	5–2
8	October 31	@ L.A Lakers	L 93–113	Harris & Jackson (18)	Andre Drummond (12)	Drummond & Jackson (5)	Staples Center; 17,569	5–3

November : 9–3 (home: 6–1; road: 3–2)

Game	Date	Team	Score	High points	High rebounds	High assists	Location Attendance	Record
9	November 3	Milwaukee	W 105–96	Andre Drummond (24)	Andre Drummond (15)	Reggie Jackson (8)	Little Caesars Arena; 17,207	6–3
10	November 4	Sacramento	W 108–99	Avery Bradley (24)	Andre Drummond (19)	Reggie Jackson (7)	Little Caesars Arena; 17,683	7–3
11	November 8	Indiana	W 114–97	Tobias Harris (23)	Andre Drummond (21)	Reggie Jackson (6)	Little Caesars Arena; 14,407	8–3
12	November 10	Atlanta	W 111–104	Reggie Jackson (22)	Andre Drummond (20)	Andre Drummond (7)	Little Caesars Arena; 16,687	9–3
13	November 12	Miami	W 112–103	Tobias Harris (25)	Andre Drummond (17)	Ish Smith (7)	Little Caesars Arena; 16,236	10–3
14	November 15	@ Milwaukee	L 95–99	Avery Bradley (28)	Andre Drummond (17)	Avery Bradley (5)	Bradley Center; 15,494	10–4
15	November 17	@ Indiana	L 100–107	Jackson & Bradley (16)	Andre Drummond (15)	Reggie Jackson (7)	Bankers Life Fieldhouse; 17,188	10–5
16	November 19	@ Minnesota	W 100–97	Andre Drummond (20)	Andre Drummond (16)	Reggie Jackson (8)	Target Center; 16,069	11–5
17	November 20	Cleveland	L 88–116	Tobias Harris (11)	Andre Drummond (8)	Reggie Jackson (6)	Little Caesars Arena; 20,587	11–6
18	November 24	@ Oklahoma City	W 99–98	Andre Drummond (17)	Andre Drummond (14)	Jackson & Smith (4)	Chesapeake Energy Arena; 18,203	12–6
19	November 27	@ Boston	W 118–108	Tobias Harris (31)	Andre Drummond (22)	Reggie Jackson (7)	TD Garden; 18,624	13–6
20	November 29	Phoenix	W 131–107	Reggie Jackson (23)	Drummond & Harris (7)	Andre Drummond (7)	Little Caesars Arena; 18,096	14–6

December : 6–9 (home: 4–3; road: 2–6)

Game	Date	Team	Score	High points	High rebounds	High assists	Location Attendance	Record
21	December 1	@ Washington	L 91–109	Tobias Harris (15)	Andre Drummond (17)	Andre Drummond (7)	Verizon Center; 17,885	14–7
22	December 2	@ Philadelphia	L 103–108	Tobias Harris (27)	Andre Drummond (11)	Andre Drummond (6)	Wells Fargo Center; 20,562	14–8
23	December 4	@ San Antonio	L 93–96	Reggie Jackson (27)	Andre Drummond (15)	Avery Bradley (4)	AT&T Center; 18,288	14–9
24	December 6	@ Milwaukee	L 100–104	Andre Drummond (27)	Andre Drummond (20)	Andre Drummond (6)	Bradley Center; 15,841	14–10
25	December 8	Golden State	L 98–102	Avery Bradley (25)	Andre Drummond (17)	Drummond & Smith (4)	Little Caesars Arena; 20,491	14–11
26	December 10	Boston	L 81–91	Tobias Harris (19)	Andre Drummond (15)	Ish Smith (5)	Little Caesars Arena; 18,776	14–12
27	December 12	Denver	L 84–103	Langston Galloway (18)	Andre Drummond (15)	Ish Smith (5)	Little Caesars Arena; 15,494	14–13
28	December 14	@ Atlanta	W 105–91	Tobias Harris (19)	Andre Drummond (19)	Andre Drummond (9)	Philips Arena; 13,548	15–13
29	December 15	@ Indiana	W 104–98	Andre Drummond (23)	Andre Drummond (13)	Harris, Kennard, Johnson & Smith (4)	Bankers Life Fieldhouse; 14,687	16–13
30	December 17	Orlando	W 114–110	Reggie Bullock (20)	Eric Moreland (8)	Smith & Jackson (6)	Little Caesars Arena; 16,312	17–13
31	December 20	@ Dallas	L 93–110	Anthony Tolliver (18)	Andre Drummond (13)	Reggie Jackson (5)	American Airlines Center; 19,580	17–14
32	December 22	New York	W 104–101	Tobias Harris (24)	Andre Drummond (15)	Reggie Jackson (8)	Little Caesars Arena; 16,922	18–14
33	December 26	Indiana	W 107–83	Tobias Harris (30)	Andre Drummond (18)	Reggie Jackson (13)	Little Caesars Arena; 20,451	19–14
34	December 28	@ Orlando	L 89–102	Tobias Harris (21)	Andre Drummond (18)	Drummond & Smith (5)	Amway Center; 18,846	19–15
35	December 30	San Antonio	W 93–79	Reggie Bullock (22)	Andre Drummond (17)	Andre Drummond (6)	Little Caesars Arena; 19,671	20–15

January : 3–11 (home: 2–5; road: 1–6)

Game	Date	Team	Score	High points	High rebounds	High assists	Location Attendance	Record
36	January 3	@ Miami	L 104–111	Tobias Harris (19)	Boban Marjanović (9)	Smith, Bradley & Buycks (4)	American Airlines Arena; 19,600	20–16
37	January 5	@ Philadelphia	L 78–114	Tobias Harris (14)	Andre Drummond (8)	Dwight Buycks (6)	Wells Fargo Center; 20,592	20–17
38	January 6	Houston	W 108–101	Tobias Harris (27)	Harris & Moreland (8)	Moreland & Smith (4)	Little Caesars Arena; 18,046	21–17
39	January 8	@ New Orleans	L 109–112	Tobias Harris (25)	Andre Drummond (14)	Avery Bradley (6)	Smoothie King Center; 12,874	21–18
40	January 10	@ Brooklyn	W 114–80	Drummond & Harris (22)	Andre Drummond (20)	Bradley, Drummond & Smith (5)	Barclays Center; 13,457	22–18
41	January 13	@ Chicago	L 105–107	Avery Bradley (26)	Andre Drummond (15)	Ish Smith (6)	United Center; 21,613	22–19
42	January 15	Charlotte	L 107–118	Bullock & Harris (20)	Andre Drummond (10)	Ish Smith (10)	Little Caesars Arena; 17,200	22–20
43	January 17	@ Toronto	L 91–96	Andre Drummond (25)	Andre Drummond (17)	Dwight Buycks (6)	Air Canada Centre; 19,800	22–21
44	January 19	Washington	L 112–122	Tobias Harris (17)	Andre Drummond (21)	Andre Drummond (8)	Little Caesars Arena; 14,744	22–22
45	January 21	Brooklyn	L 100–101	Tobias Harris (20)	Andre Drummond (13)	Galloway & Harris (5)	Little Caesars Arena; 17,544	22–23
46	January 24	Utah	L 95–98 (OT)	Andre Drummond (30)	Andre Drummond (24)	Drummond, Galloway, Johnson & Kennard (4)	Little Caesars Arena; 15,682	22–24
47	January 27	Oklahoma City	L 108–121	Tobias Harris (21)	Andre Drummond (13)	Ish Smith (9)	Little Caesars Arena; 20,491	22–25
48	January 28	@ Cleveland	L 104–121	Harris & Tolliver (20)	Andre Drummond (11)	Smith & Tolliver (5)	Quicken Loans Arena; 20,562	22–26
49	January 30	Cleveland	W 125–114	Stanley Johnson (26)	Andre Drummond (22)	Drummond & Smith (7)	Little Caesars Arena; 18,508	23–26

February : 6–6 (home: 6–3; road: 0–3)

Game	Date	Team	Score	High points	High rebounds	High assists	Location Attendance	Record
50	February 1	Memphis	W 104–102	Blake Griffin (24)	Andre Drummond (15)	Blake Griffin (5)	Little Caesars Arena; 17,481	24–26
51	February 3	Miami	W 111–107	Ish Smith (25)	Andre Drummond (20)	Griffin & Smith (7)	Little Caesars Arena; 18,747	25–26
52	February 5	Portland	W 111–91	Blake Griffin (21)	Andre Drummond (17)	Ish Smith (7)	Little Caesars Arena; 13,810	26–26
53	February 7	Brooklyn	W 115–106	Blake Griffin (25)	Andre Drummond (27)	Blake Griffin (7)	Little Caesars Arena; 15,114	27–26
54	February 9	L.A. Clippers	L 95–108	Bullock & Griffin (19)	Andre Drummond (17)	Blake Griffin (8)	Little Caesars Arena; 16,697	27–27
55	February 11	@ Atlanta	L 115–118	Andre Drummond (25)	Andre Drummond (15)	Ish Smith (7)	Philips Arena; 15,214	27–28
56	February 12	New Orleans	L 103–118	Blake Griffin (22)	Andre Drummond (21)	Jameer Nelson (5)	Little Caesars Arena; 14,453	27–29
57	February 14	Atlanta	W 104–98	Ish Smith (22)	Andre Drummond (15)	Griffin & Smith (9)	Little Caesars Arena; 15,849	28–29
All-Star Break
58	February 23	Boston	L 98–110	Ish Smith (20)	Andre Drummond (17)	Ish Smith (6)	Little Caesars Arena; 20,491	28–30
59	February 25	@ Charlotte	L 98–114	Blake Griffin (20)	Andre Drummond (14)	Ish Smith (8)	Spectrum Center; 17,894	28–31
60	February 26	@ Toronto	L 94–123	Andre Drummond (18)	Andre Drummond (18)	Blake Griffin (5)	Air Canada Centre; 19,800	28–32
61	February 28	Milwaukee	W 110–87	Stanley Johnson (19)	Andre Drummond (16)	Blake Griffin (7)	Little Caesars Arena; 16,146	29–32

March : 7–8 (home: 4–1; road: 3–7)

Game	Date	Team	Score	High points	High rebounds	High assists	Location Attendance	Record
62	March 2	@ Orlando	L 106–115 (OT)	Bullock & Ennis (21)	Andre Drummond (15)	Blake Griffin (9)	Amway Center; 17,223	29–33
63	March 3	@ Miami	L 96–105	Blake Griffin (31)	Andre Drummond (18)	Blake Griffin (6)	American Airlines Arena; 19,600	29–34
64	March 5	@ Cleveland	L 90–112	Blake Griffin (25)	Andre Drummond (9)	Ish Smith (6)	Quicken Loans Arena; 20,562	29–35
65	March 7	Toronto	L 119–121 (OT)	Blake Griffin (31)	Andre Drummond (21)	Ish Smith (7)	Little Caesars Arena; 17,769	29–36
66	March 9	Chicago	W 99–83	Blake Griffin (25)	Andre Drummond (17)	Blake Griffin (8)	Little Caesars Arena; 17,406	30–36
67	March 13	@ Utah	L 79–110	Luke Kennard (18)	Andre Drummond (11)	Jameer Nelson (4)	Vivint Smart Home Arena; 18,306	30–37
68	March 15	@ Denver	L 113–120	Blake Griffin (26)	Andre Drummond (17)	Blake Griffin (9)	Pepsi Center; 18,697	30–38
69	March 17	@ Portland	L 87–100	Andre Drummond (18)	Andre Drummond (22)	Blake Griffin (7)	Moda Center; 19,727	30–39
70	March 19	@ Sacramento	W 106–90	Blake Griffin (26)	Andre Drummond (16)	Blake Griffin (7)	Golden 1 Center; 17,583	31–39
71	March 20	@ Phoenix	W 115–88	Blake Griffin (26)	Andre Drummond (10)	Blake Griffin (10)	Talking Stick Resort Arena; 17,400	32–39
72	March 22	@ Houston	L 96–100 (OT)	Blake Griffin (21)	Andre Drummond (20)	Blake Griffin (10)	Toyota Center; 18,055	32–40
73	March 24	Chicago	W 117–95	Anthony Tolliver (25)	Andre Drummond (20)	Blake Griffin (9)	Little Caesars Arena; 19,139	33–40
74	March 26	L.A. Lakers	W 112–106	Reggie Jackson (20)	Andre Drummond (18)	Stanley Johnson (6)	Little Caesars Arena; 18,718	34–40
75	March 29	Washington	W 103–92	Andre Drummond (24)	Andre Drummond (23)	Reggie Jackson (8)	Little Caesars Arena; 18,268	35–40
76	March 31	@ New York	W 115–109	Andre Drummond (22)	Andre Drummond (17)	Ish Smith (6)	Madison Square Garden; 19,812	36–40

April : 3–3 (home: 1–2; road: 2–1)

Game	Date	Team	Score	High points	High rebounds	High assists	Location Attendance	Record
77	April 1	@ Brooklyn	W 108–96	Reggie Jackson (29)	Andre Drummond (14)	Stanley Johnson (4)	Barclays Center; 16,097	37–40
78	April 4	Philadelphia	L 108–115	Anthony Tolliver (25)	Andre Drummond (15)	Ish Smith (12)	Little Caesars Arena; 18,395	37–41
79	April 6	Dallas	W 113–106 (OT)	Reggie Jackson (24)	Andre Drummond (15)	Reggie Jackson (7)	Little Caesars Arena; 18,768	38–41
80	April 8	@ Memphis	L 117–130	Anthony Tolliver (19)	Andre Drummond (18)	Ish Smith (11)	FedExForum; 16,044	38–42
81	April 9	Toronto	L 98–108	Luke Kennard (20)	Kennard & Moreland (7)	Reggie Jackson (9)	Little Caesars Arena; 17,529	38–43
82	April 11	@ Chicago	W 119–87	Luke Kennard (23)	Eric Moreland (17)	Reggie Jackson (10)	United Center; 21,342	39–43

2017–18 season schedule

== Player statistics ==
Legend
GP	Games played	GS	Games started	MPG	Minutes per game
FG%	Field-goal percentage	3P%	3-point field-goal percentage	FT%	Free-throw percentage
RPG	Rebounds per game	APG	Assists per game	SPG	Steals per game
BPG	Blocks per game	PPG	Points per game

=== Season ===
Player	GP	GS	MPG	FG%	3P%	FT%	RPG	APG	SPG	BPG	PPG
Blake Griffin^{†‡}	25	25	33.2	.433	.348	.784	6.6	6.2	.44	.36	19.8
Tobias Harris^{‡}	48	48	32.6	.451	.409	.846	5.1	2.0	.71	.31	18.1
Avery Bradley^{‡}	40	40	31.7	.409	.381	.763	2.4	2.1	1.15	.18	15.0
Andre Drummond	78	78	33.7	.529	.000	.605	16.0	3.0	1.46	1.63	15.0
Reggie Jackson	45	45	26.7	.426	.308	.836	2.8	5.3	.60	.09	14.6
Reggie Bullock	62	52	27.9	.489	.445	.796	2.5	1.5	.76	.21	11.3
Ish Smith	82	35	24.9	.486	.347	.698	2.7	4.4	.78	.24	10.9
Anthony Tolliver	79	14	22.2	.464	.436	.797	3.1	1.1	.41	.27	8.9
Stanley Johnson	69	50	27.4	.375	.286	.772	3.7	1.6	1.38	.20	8.7
Luke Kennard	73	9	20.0	.443	.415	.855	2.4	1.7	.60	.18	7.6
James Ennis^{†}	27	8	20.4	.457	.304	.767	2.5	.8	.56	.22	7.5
Dwight Buycks	29	0	14.7	.414	.333	.878	1.4	2.0	.66	.07	7.4
Boban Marjanović^{‡}	19	1	9.0	.519	.000	.800	3.0	.7	.21	.32	6.2
Langston Galloway	58	2	14.9	.371	.344	.805	1.6	1.0	.60	.09	6.2
Jon Leuer	8	0	17.0	.417	.000	.867	4.0	.6	.13	.38	5.4
Henry Ellenson	38	0	8.7	.363	.333	.862	2.1	.5	.13	.00	4.0
Jameer Nelson^{†}	7	0	16.6	.282	.071	1.000	1.1	3.3	.57	.14	3.7
Eric Moreland	67	3	12.0	.541	.000	.379	4.1	1.2	.46	.76	1.9
Reggie Hearn	3	0	2.3	.500	.500	.000	0.0	0.0	0.0	0.0	1.0
Kay Felder	2	0	3.0	.250	.000	.000	2.0	0.0	.0	.0	1.0
Willie Reed^{†‡}	3	0	3.0	1.000	.000	.000	.3	.3	.00	.00	0.7
Luis Montero	2	0	4.0	.000	.000	.000	1.0	.0	.0	.0	0.0

^{†}Denotes player spent time with another team before joining the Pistons. Stats reflect time with the Pistons only.
^{‡}Denotes traded mid-season.

== Transactions ==
=== Overview ===
Players Added

Via draft

- Luke Kennard

Via trade

- Avery Bradley
- James Ennis
- Blake Griffin
- Brice Johnson
- Jameer Nelson
- Willie Reed

Via free agency

- Langston Galloway
- Eric Moreland
- Anthony Tolliver
Players Lost

Via trade

- Avery Bradley
- Tobias Harris
- Darrun Hilliard
- Brice Johnson
- Boban Marjanović
- Marcus Morris
- Willie Reed

Via free agency

- Kentavious Caldwell-Pope
- Aron Baynes

=== Trades ===
June 28, 2017	To Detroit Pistons Cash considerations	To Houston Rockets Darrun Hilliard
July 7, 2017	To Detroit Pistons Avery Bradley; 2019 2nd-round pick	To Boston Celtics Marcus Morris
January 30, 2018	To Detroit Pistons Blake Griffin; Brice Johnson; Willie Reed	To Los Angeles Clippers Avery Bradley; Tobias Harris; Boban Marjanović; 2018 1st-round pick 2019 2nd-round pick
February 8, 2018	To Detroit Pistons Jameer Nelson	To Chicago Bulls Willie Reed; Future 2nd-round pick
February 8, 2018	To Detroit Pistons James Ennis	To Memphis Grizzlies Brice Johnson; 2022 2nd-round pick

=== Free agency ===
==== Re-signed ====
Date	Player	Contract terms	Ref.
July 14	Reggie Bullock	2-year contract worth $5 million	

==== Additions ====
Date	Player	Contract terms	Former team	Ref.
July 6	Langston Galloway	3-year contract worth $21 million	Sacramento Kings	
July 6	Eric Moreland	3-year contract worth $4.8 million	Canton Charge (G League)	
July 14	Anthony Tolliver	1-year contract worth $3.29 million	Sacramento Kings	

==== Subtractions ====
Date	Player	Contract terms	New team	Ref.
July 13	Kentavious Caldwell-Pope	1-year contract worth $18 million	Los Angeles Lakers	
July 19	Aron Baynes	1-year contract worth $4.3 million	Boston Celtics	
