= 2017–18 Philadelphia 76ers season =

NBA professional basketball team season

- Head coach: Brett Brown
- General manager: Bryan Colangelo
- Owners: Josh Harris
- Arena: Wells Fargo Center

Results
- Record: 52–30 (.634)
- Place: Division: 3rd (Atlantic); Conference: 3rd (Eastern)
- Playoff finish: Conference Semifinals (lost to Celtics 1–4)
- Stats at Basketball Reference

Local media
- Television: NBCSPHI, NBCSPHI+, 6ABC
- Radio: WPEN

The 2017–18 Philadelphia 76ers season was the 69th season of the franchise in the National Basketball Association (NBA). The team was 25–25 after the first 50 games, but finished the remainder of the season with a 27–5 record. It was the team's first playoff appearance since 2011-12. It was also the team's first 50-win season since 2000–01, when they last made the NBA Finals. The Sixers closed the regular season on a 16-game winning streak, a franchise record as well as becoming the only team in NBA history to end the regular season with 16 consecutive wins in the process (the winning streak continued in the playoffs, but was ended at 17 when the Miami Heat defeated them in Game 2 of the first round).

The Sixers had acquired the first overall draft pick from the Boston Celtics on June 19, four days before the 2017 NBA draft began in exchange for their third overall draft pick that year (which became Jayson Tatum) and another first-round pick in 2019, their own or the Kings which ever is better (Sixers would get the pick if it was #1 overall). They used the 2017 first overall pick to select Markelle Fultz, who missed most of his rookie season due to injuries.

Center Joel Embiid became the first Sixers All-Star since Jrue Holiday in 2013.

They finished the regular season with 52–30 record, which clinched the third seed. In the playoffs, the 76ers faced the sixth-seeded Miami Heat in the first round, and won in five games, advancing to the conference semifinals, where they faced their rivals, the Boston Celtics, losing in five games. It was the 20th meeting in the NBA Playoffs for these two franchises.

== Draft picks ==
Round	Pick	Player	Position(s)	Nationality	College / Club
1	1	Markelle Fultz	PG	United States	Washington
1	25	Anžejs Pasečņiks	C	Latvia	(Spain) CB Gran Canaria
2	36	Jonah Bolden	PF	Australia	(Serbia) KK FMP Beograd
2	50	Mathias Lessort	PF	France	(France) Nanterre 92

The Sixers ended the 2016–17 season with the fourth best NBA draft lottery odds and also due to trades had a chance to have the Lakers pick, which had the third-best odds of staying in the Top 3, as well as held the possibility to swap picks with the Sacramento Kings, depending on whether Sacramento moved ahead of them or not. It ended with them having the third pick of the 2017 NBA draft thanks to the Sacramento Kings, while the Kings would end up with the fifth pick of the draft and the Lakers kept their pick as the second pick of the draft. Philadelphia would also have four different second-round picks this year, with none of them being their original pick due to the aforementioned trade with Sacramento, but all of their second-round picks would be acquired from the previous season via trades. Two of their second-round picks were the incentive of trading away Kendall Marshall to the Utah Jazz, where Philadelphia would acquire the best and worst of four different draft picks this year. Another second-round pick would be had in a trade deadline deal (alongside the incentive to swap their worst second-round pick they acquired from Utah with the Atlanta Hawks) which included champion power forward/center Tiago Splitter in exchange for Ersan İlyasova. Their last second-round pick would be acquired from the Dallas Mavericks, where they would have the Mavericks' second-round pick this year and in 2020 and Justin Anderson in exchange for center/power forward Nerlens Noel. On June 19, three days before the day of the 2017 NBA draft began, the 76ers would swap Duke University's Jayson Tatum, their #3 pick with the Boston Celtics (as well as either the Los Angeles Lakers' 2018 first-round pick or the Sacramento Kings' 2019 first-round pick as long as it isn't the #1 pick in 2019) in exchange for Boston's #1 pick, which ultimately became Markelle Fultz.

As the consensus #1 pick of the draft that year, Fultz showed off a considerable display during his freshman season at the University of Washington. While Markelle wound up being in a rather similar situation that his teammate and former #1 draft pick Ben Simmons had back at Louisiana State University before the 2016 NBA draft, he did display some of the absolute best efforts he could have possibly provided Washington in what was otherwise a losing season for them. At his only season in Washington, Fultz provided an outstanding stat line of 23.2 points, 5.9 assists, 5.7 rebounds, 1.6 steals, and 1.2 blocks per game in only 25 games played for them; not only would those statistics be some of the best recorded in Pac-12 history in over 20 years (around the time the division was named the Pac-10), but he also was the first freshman to be named to record averages of at least 20 points, 5 rebounds, and 5 assists per game since LaDrell Washington back in the 1994–95 season. Under such results, he would obviously not only be named a member of the All-Pac-12 First Team, but also be considered a consensus All-American Third Team member for the effort he made to help Washington become competitive in spite of a losing season otherwise. On draft night, Philadelphia would end up trading away some of their second-round picks in exchange for future assets, while also gaining a first-round pick from the Orlando Magic in the process. In exchange for giving up a protected first-round pick of sorts and a 2020 second-round pick, the 76ers acquired the Magic's 25th pick, which became the Latvian center Anžejs Pasečņiks of the Herbalife Gran Canaria out in Spain. Throughout his international career, he became a three-time champion in his native land of Latvia before winning a Spanish championship and being named a member of the Liga ACB's All-Young Players Team in more recent years. After that, for the first of Philadelphia's own second-round draft picks this year, they selected the Australian power forward Jonah Bolden, a former UCLA student before recently playing for the KK FMP Beograd out in Serbia. While not being particularly special at UCLA, Bolden received a second wind in Serbia by averaging 12.9 points, 7.2 rebounds, 1.8 assists, 1.0 steal, and 1.0 block per game with the FMP Beograd, which earned him the honor of being the Adriatic League's Top Prospect that year. After that, they would trade their next two second-round picks (sophomore point guard Jawun Evans of Oklahoma State University and senior shooting guard Sterling Brown of Southern Methodist University respectively) to the Los Angeles Clippers and Milwaukee Bucks respectively in exchange for cash considerations that'd be had for usage once again on July 1. Finally, with their last second-round pick, the 76ers selected the Martinique born French power forward Mathias Lessort of the Nanterre 92 in France's LNB Pro A. In his professional career out in France, Lessort won co-Sixth Man of the Year honors with Matt Howard back with Élan Chalon in 2016 before recently winning the French Basketball Cup and FIBA Europe Cup championships with the Nanterre 92.

== Game log ==
=== Preseason ===
2017 pre-season game log
Total: 2–3 (home: 1–2; road: 1–1)
Pre-season: 2–3 (home: 1–2; road: 1–1)

Game	Date	Team	Score	High points	High rebounds	High assists	Location Attendance	Record
1	October 4	Memphis	L 89–110	Covington, Okafor (13)	Ben Simmons (7)	Ben Simmons (9)	Wells Fargo Center; 18,102	0–1
2	October 6	Boston	L 102–110	Jerryd Bayless (15)	Robert Covington (7)	McConnell, Simmons (5)	Wells Fargo Center; 17,668	0–2
3	October 9	@ Boston	L 96–113	Ben Simmons (15)	Johnson, Šarić (7)	T. J. McConnell (4)	TD Garden; 18,624	0–3
4	October 11	@ Brooklyn	W 133–114	Dario Šarić (26)	Dario Šarić (9)	Ben Simmons (6)	Nassau Veterans Memorial Coliseum; N/A	1–3
5	October 13	Miami	W 119–95	McConnell, Simmons (19)	Covington, Embiid, Simmons (7)	Ben Simmons (5)	Sprint Center; 11,249	2–3

2017–18 season schedule

=== Regular season ===
2017–18 game log
Total: 52–30 (home: 30–11; road: 22–19)
October: 3–4 (home: 0–2; road: 3–2)

Game	Date	Team	Score	High points	High rebounds	High assists	Location Attendance	Record
1	October 18	@ Washington	L 115–120	Robert Covington (29)	Joel Embiid (13)	Ben Simmons (5)	Capital One Arena; 20,356	0–1
2	October 20	Boston	L 92–102	JJ Redick (19)	Joel Embiid (14)	Ben Simmons (5)	Wells Fargo Center; 20,816	0–2
3	October 21	@ Toronto	L 94–128	Ben Simmons (18)	Ben Simmons (10)	Ben Simmons (8)	Air Canada Centre; 19,800	0–3
4	October 23	@ Detroit	W 97–86	Joel Embiid (30)	Ben Simmons (12)	Ben Simmons (10)	Little Caesars Arena; 13,709	1–3
5	October 25	Houston	L 104–105	JJ Redick (22)	Johnson, Simmons (7)	McConnell, Simmons (9)	Wells Fargo Center; 20,682	1–4
6	October 28	@ Dallas	W 112–110	Embiid, Simmons (23)	Joel Embiid (9)	Ben Simmons (8)	American Airlines Center; 19,567	2–4
7	October 30	@ Houston	W 115–107	Joel Embiid (22)	Amir Johnson (10)	Ben Simmons (9)	Toyota Center; 16,714	3–4

November : 9–5 (home: 6–2; road: 3–3)

Game	Date	Team	Score	High points	High rebounds	High assists	Location Attendance	Record
8	November 1	Atlanta	W 119–109	Robert Covington (22)	Ben Simmons (13)	Ben Simmons (9)	Wells Fargo Center; 20,549	4–4
9	November 3	Indiana	W 121–110	JJ Redick (31)	Ben Simmons (11)	Ben Simmons (11)	Wells Fargo Center; 20,668	5–4
10	November 7	@ Utah	W 104–97	Dario Šarić (25)	Ben Simmons (13)	T. J. McConnell (8)	Vivint Smart Home Arena; 16,063	6–4
11	November 9	@ Sacramento	L 108–109	Robert Covington (24)	Joel Embiid (15)	McConnell, Simmons (6)	Golden 1 Center; 17,583	6–5
12	November 11	@ Golden State	L 114–135	JJ Redick (17)	Joel Embiid (7)	Ben Simmons (8)	Oracle Arena; 19,596	6–6
13	November 13	@ L.A. Clippers	W 109–105	Joel Embiid (32)	Joel Embiid (16)	McConnell, Redick (6)	Staples Center; 19,068	7–6
14	November 15	@ L.A. Lakers	W 115–109	Joel Embiid (46)	Joel Embiid (15)	Ben Simmons (10)	Staples Center; 18,997	8–6
15	November 18	Golden State	L 116–124	Ben Simmons (23)	Dario Šarić (10)	Ben Simmons (12)	Wells Fargo Center; 20,848	8–7
16	November 20	Utah	W 107–86	Ben Simmons (27)	Joel Embiid (11)	T. J. McConnell (5)	Wells Fargo Center; 20,587	9–7
17	November 22	Portland	W 101–81	Joel Embiid (28)	Joel Embiid (12)	Ben Simmons (9)	Wells Fargo Center; 20,605	10–7
18	November 25	Orlando	W 130–111	JJ Redick (29)	Joel Embiid (14)	T. J. McConnell (13)	Wells Fargo Center; 20,585	11–7
19	November 27	Cleveland	L 91–113	Joel Embiid (30)	Joel Embiid (11)	Robert Covington (4)	Wells Fargo Center; 20,527	11–8
20	November 29	Washington	W 118–113	Ben Simmons (31)	Ben Simmons (18)	Bayless, Embiid, Redick, Simmons (4)	Wells Fargo Center; 20,492	12–8
21	November 30	@ Boston	L 97–108	Dario Šarić (18)	Dario Šarić (10)	Ben Simmons (7)	TD Garden; 18,624	12–9

December : 5–10 (home: 1–5; road: 4–5)

Game	Date	Team	Score	High points	High rebounds	High assists	Location Attendance	Record
22	December 2	Detroit	W 108–103	Covington, Embiid (25)	Embiid, Simmons (10)	JJ Redick (7)	Wells Fargo Center; 20,562	13–9
23	December 4	Phoenix	L 101–115	JJ Redick (25)	Joel Embiid (12)	Ben Simmons (7)	Wells Fargo Center; 20,564	13–10
24	December 7	L.A. Lakers	L 104–107	Joel Embiid (33)	Ben Simmons (13)	Ben Simmons (15)	Wells Fargo Center; 20,495	13–11
25	December 9	@ Cleveland	L 98–105	Covington, Redick (19)	Dario Šarić (9)	Ben Simmons (10)	Quicken Loans Arena; 20,562	13–12
26	December 10	@ New Orleans	L 124–131	JJ Redick (28)	Dario Šarić (11)	Ben Simmons (10)	Smoothie King Center; 16,878	13–13
27	December 12	@ Minnesota	W 118–112 (OT)	Joel Embiid (28)	Joel Embiid (12)	Embiid, Simmons (8)	Target Center; 14,659	14–13
28	December 15	Oklahoma City	L 117–119 (3OT)	Joel Embiid (34)	Robert Covington (10)	Ben Simmons (11)	Wells Fargo Center; 20,612	14–14
29	December 18	@ Chicago	L 115–117	Dario Šarić (27)	Ben Simmons (11)	Ben Simmons (9)	United Center; 20,796	14–15
30	December 19	Sacramento	L 95–101	Robert Covington (17)	Ben Simmons (12)	Ben Simmons (9)	Wells Fargo Center; 20,558	14–16
31	December 21	Toronto	L 109–114	Ben Simmons (20)	Dario Šarić (10)	Dario Šarić (9)	Wells Fargo Center; 20,680	14–17
32	December 23	@ Toronto	L 86–102	Dario Šarić (17)	Joel Embiid (8)	Ben Simmons (6)	Air Canada Centre; 19,800	14–18
33	December 25	@ New York	W 105–98	Joel Embiid (25)	Joel Embiid (16)	T. J. McConnell (4)	Madison Square Garden; 19,812	15–18
34	December 28	@ Portland	L 110–114	Joel Embiid (29)	Embiid, Šarić (9)	Ben Simmons (8)	Moda Center; 20,104	15–19
35	December 30	@ Denver	W 107–102	Dario Šarić (20)	Joel Embiid (10)	T. J. McConnell (8)	Pepsi Center; 19,599	16–19
36	December 31	@ Phoenix	W 123–110	Dario Šarić (27)	Joel Embiid (9)	Ben Simmons (6)	Talking Stick Resort Arena; 16,983	17–19

January : 7–5 (home: 5–1; road: 2–4)

Game	Date	Team	Score	High points	High rebounds	High assists	Location Attendance	Record
37	January 3	San Antonio	W 112–106	Ben Simmons (26)	Joel Embiid (11)	Embiid, McConnell, Simmons, Redick (4)	Wells Fargo Center; 20,642	18–19
38	January 5	Detroit	W 114–78	Joel Embiid (23)	Joel Embiid (9)	Ben Simmons (9)	Wells Fargo Center; 20,592	19–19
39	January 11	Boston	L 103–114	JJ Redick (22)	Joel Embiid (10)	Embiid, McConnell (5)	The O2 Arena; 19.078	19–20
40	January 15	Toronto	W 117–111	Joel Embiid (34)	Joel Embiid (11)	T. J. McConnell (8)	Wells Fargo Center; 20,637	20–20
41	January 18	@ Boston	W 89–80	Joel Embiid (26)	Joel Embiid (16)	Joel Embiid (6)	TD Garden; 18,624	21–20
42	January 20	Milwaukee	W 116–94	Joel Embiid (29)	Joel Embiid (9)	Ben Simmons (9)	Wells Fargo Center; 20,826	22–20
43	January 22	@ Memphis	L 101–105	Dario Šarić (22)	Joel Embiid (14)	Ben Simmons (7)	FedExForum; 14,288	22–21
44	January 24	Chicago	W 115–101	Joel Embiid (22)	Ben Simmons (17)	Ben Simmons (14)	Wells Fargo Center; 20,547	23–21
45	January 26	@ San Antonio	W 97–78	Ben Simmons (21)	Joel Embiid (14)	Ben Simmons (7)	AT&T Center; 18,418	24–21
46	January 28	@ Oklahoma City	L 112–122	Joel Embiid (27)	Joel Embiid (10)	Ben Simmons (7)	Chesapeake Energy Arena; 18,203	24–22
47	January 29	@ Milwaukee	L 95–107	Dario Šarić (19)	Dario Šarić (9)	Ben Simmons (5)	BMO Harris Bradley Center; 14,126	24–23
48	January 31	@ Brooklyn	L 108–116	Joel Embiid (29)	Joel Embiid (14)	Ben Simmons (7)	Barclays Center; 15,577	24–24

February : 8–3 (home: 7–0; road: 1–3)

Game	Date	Team	Score	High points	High rebounds	High assists	Location Attendance	Record
49	February 2	Miami	W 103–97	Ben Simmons (20)	Joel Embiid (11)	McConnell, Simmons (5)	Wells Fargo Center; 20,636	25–24
50	February 3	@ Indiana	L 92–100	Joel Embiid (24)	Ben Simmons (11)	Ben Simmons (6)	Bankers Life Fieldhouse; 17,923	25–25
51	February 6	Washington	W 115–102	Joel Embiid (27)	Joel Embiid (12)	Ben Simmons (8)	Wells Fargo Center; 20,530	26–25
52	February 9	New Orleans	W 100–82	Embiid, Šarić (24)	Joel Embiid (16)	Ben Simmons (8)	Wells Fargo Center; 20,489	27–25
53	February 10	LA Clippers	W 112–98	Joel Embiid (29)	Joel Embiid (16)	Ben Simmons (10)	Wells Fargo Center; 20,504	28–25
54	February 12	New York	W 108–92	Dario Šarić (24)	T. J. McConnell (10)	T. J. McConnell (11)	Wells Fargo Center; 20,589	29–25
55	February 14	Miami	W 104–102	Dario Šarić (19)	Ben Simmons (12)	Ben Simmons (10)	Wells Fargo Center; 20,492	30–25
56	February 22	@ Chicago	W 116–115	Ben Simmons (32)	Joel Embiid (13)	Ben Simmons (11)	United Center; 21,312	31–25
57	February 24	Orlando	W 116–105	Joel Embiid (28)	Joel Embiid (14)	Ben Simmons (7)	Wells Fargo Center; 20,594	32–25
58	February 25	@ Washington	L 94–109	Joel Embiid (25)	Joel Embiid (10)	Ben Simmons (8)	Capital One Arena; 17,180	32–26
59	February 27	@ Miami	L 101–102	Joel Embiid (23)	Joel Embiid (8)	Ben Simmons (6)	American Airlines Arena; 19,600	32–27

March : 13–3 (home: 7–1; road: 6–2)

Game	Date	Team	Score	High points	High rebounds	High assists	Location Attendance	Record
60	March 1	@ Cleveland	W 108–97	JJ Redick (22)	Joel Embiid (14)	Ben Simmons (8)	Quicken Loans Arena; 20,562	33–27
61	March 2	Charlotte	W 110–99	Joel Embiid (23)	Joel Embiid (14)	Ben Simmons (6)	Wells Fargo Center; 20,487	34–27
62	March 4	@ Milwaukee	L 110–118	Dario Šarić (25)	Joel Embiid (8)	Ben Simmons (15)	Bradley Center; 15,587	34–28
63	March 6	@ Charlotte	W 128–114	Robert Covington (22)	Ben Simmons (8)	Ben Simmons (13)	Spectrum Center; 15,600	35–28
64	March 8	@ Miami	L 99–108	Dario Šarić (20)	Dario Šarić (10)	Ben Simmons (8)	American Airlines Arena; 19,600	35–29
65	March 11	@ Brooklyn	W 120–97	Joel Embiid (21)	Ersan İlyasova (13)	McConnell, Simmons (6)	Barclays Center; 16,901	36–29
66	March 13	Indiana	L 98–101	Joel Embiid (29)	Ben Simmons (13)	Ben Simmons (10)	Wells Fargo Center; 20,531	36–30
67	March 15	@ New York	W 118–110	Joel Embiid (29)	Dario Šarić (12)	Ben Simmons (12)	Madison Square Garden; 18,894	37–30
68	March 16	Brooklyn	W 120–116	Joel Embiid (24)	Joel Embiid (19)	Ben Simmons (12)	Wells Fargo Center; 20,666	38–30
69	March 19	Charlotte	W 108–94	Joel Embiid (25)	Joel Embiid (19)	Ben Simmons (15)	Wells Fargo Center; 20,530	39–30
70	March 21	Memphis	W 119–105	Covington, Šarić, Redick, Belinelli (15)	Simmons, Embiid (7)	Ben Simmons (9)	Wells Fargo Center; 10,411	40–30
71	March 22	@ Orlando	W 118–98	Ersan İlyasova (18)	Ben Simmons (11)	Ben Simmons (10)	Amway Center; 17,881	41–30
72	March 24	Minnesota	W 120–108	Joel Embiid (19)	Ben Simmons (12)	Ben Simmons (13)	Wells Fargo Center; 20,668	42–30
73	March 26	Denver	W 123–104	Šarić, Embiid (20)	Embiid, Simmons (13)	Ben Simmons (11)	Wells Fargo Center; 20,585	43–30
74	March 28	New York	W 118–101	Dario Šarić (26)	Dario Šarić (14)	Ben Simmons (10)	Wells Fargo Center; 20,655	44–30
75	March 30	@ Atlanta	W 101–91	Ersan İlyasova (21)	Ersan İlyasova (16)	Ben Simmons (11)	Philips Arena; 16,579	45–30

April : 7–0 (home: 4–0; road: 3–0)

Game	Date	Team	Score	High points	High rebounds	High assists	Location Attendance	Record
76	April 1	@ Charlotte	W 119–102	Marco Belinelli (22)	Robert Covington (11)	Ben Simmons (15)	Spectrum Center; 17,005	46–30
77	April 3	Brooklyn	W 121–95	JJ Redick (19)	Ersan İlyasova (13)	Simmons, Johnson (6)	Wells Fargo Center; 20,710	47–30
78	April 4	@ Detroit	W 115–108	JJ Redick (25)	Ersan İlyasova (11)	Ben Simmons (7)	Little Caesars Arena; 18,395	48–30
79	April 6	Cleveland	W 132–130	JJ Redick (28)	Ben Simmons (15)	Ben Simmons (13)	Wells Fargo Center; 20,769	49–30
80	April 8	Dallas	W 109–97	JJ Redick (18)	Ersan İlyasova (12)	Ben Simmons (9)	Wells Fargo Center; 20,846	50–30
81	April 10	@ Atlanta	W 121–113	JJ Redick (28)	Ben Simmons (10)	Ben Simmons (9)	Philips Arena; 15,673	51–30
82	April 11	Milwaukee	W 130–95	Justin Anderson (25)	Markelle Fultz (10)	Markelle Fultz (10)	Wells Fargo Center; 20,659	52–30

2017–18 season schedule

=== Playoffs ===
2018 playoff game log
Total: 5–5 (home: 3–2; road: 2–3)
First round: 4–1 (home: 2–1; road: 2–0)

Game	Date	Team	Score	High points	High rebounds	High assists	Location Attendance	Series
1	April 14	Miami	W 130–103	JJ Redick (28)	Ersan İlyasova (14)	Ben Simmons (14)	Wells Fargo Center; 20,617	1–0
2	April 16	Miami	L 103–113	Ben Simmons (24)	Ersan İlyasova (11)	Ben Simmons (8)	Wells Fargo Center; 20,753	1–1
3	April 19	@ Miami	W 128–108	Joel Embiid (23)	Ben Simmons (12)	Ben Simmons (7)	American Airlines Arena; 19,812	2–1
4	April 21	@ Miami	W 106–102	JJ Redick (24)	Ben Simmons (13)	Ben Simmons (10)	American Airlines Arena; 19,804	3–1
5	April 24	Miami	W 104–91	JJ Redick (27)	Joel Embiid (12)	Ben Simmons (6)	Wells Fargo Center; 21,171	4–1

Conference Semifinals: 1–4 (home: 1–1; road: 0–3)

Game	Date	Team	Score	High points	High rebounds	High assists	Location Attendance	Series
1	April 30	@ Boston	L 101–117	Joel Embiid (31)	Joel Embiid (13)	Ben Simmons (6)	TD Garden; 18,624	0–1
2	May 3	@ Boston	L 103–108	JJ Redick (23)	Joel Embiid (14)	Ben Simmons (7)	TD Garden; 18,624	0–2
3	May 5	Boston	L 98–101 (OT)	Joel Embiid (22)	Joel Embiid (19)	Ben Simmons (8)	Wells Fargo Center; 20,758	0–3
4	May 7	Boston	W 103–92	Dario Šarić (25)	Embiid, Simmons (13)	McConnell, Simmons (5)	Wells Fargo Center; 20,936	1–3
5	May 9	@ Boston	L 112–114	Embiid, Šarić (27)	Joel Embiid (12)	McConnell, Simmons (6)	TD Garden; 18,624	1–4

2018 playoff schedule

== Standings ==
=== Atlantic division ===
Atlantic Division	W	L	PCT	GB	Home	Road	Div	GP
c – Toronto Raptors	59	23	.720	–	34‍–‍7	25‍–‍16	12–4	82
x – Boston Celtics	55	27	.671	4.0	27‍–‍14	28‍–‍13	12–4	82
x – Philadelphia 76ers	52	30	.634	7.0	30‍–‍11	22‍–‍19	9–7	82
New York Knicks	29	53	.354	30.0	19‍–‍22	10‍–‍31	6–10	82
Brooklyn Nets	28	54	.341	31.0	15‍–‍26	13‍–‍28	1–15	82

=== Conference standings ===
Eastern Conference
#	Team	W	L	PCT	GB	GP
1	c – Toronto Raptors *	59	23	.720	–	82
2	x – Boston Celtics	55	27	.671	4.0	82
3	x – Philadelphia 76ers	52	30	.634	7.0	82
4	y – Cleveland Cavaliers *	50	32	.610	9.0	82
5	x – Indiana Pacers	48	34	.585	11.0	82
6	y – Miami Heat *	44	38	.537	15.0	82
7	x – Milwaukee Bucks	44	38	.537	15.0	82
8	x – Washington Wizards	43	39	.524	16.0	82
9	Detroit Pistons	39	43	.476	20.0	82
10	Charlotte Hornets	36	46	.439	23.0	82
11	New York Knicks	29	53	.354	30.0	82
12	Brooklyn Nets	28	54	.341	31.0	82
13	Chicago Bulls	27	55	.329	32.0	82
14	Orlando Magic	25	57	.305	34.0	82
15	Atlanta Hawks	24	58	.293	35.0	82

== Roster ==
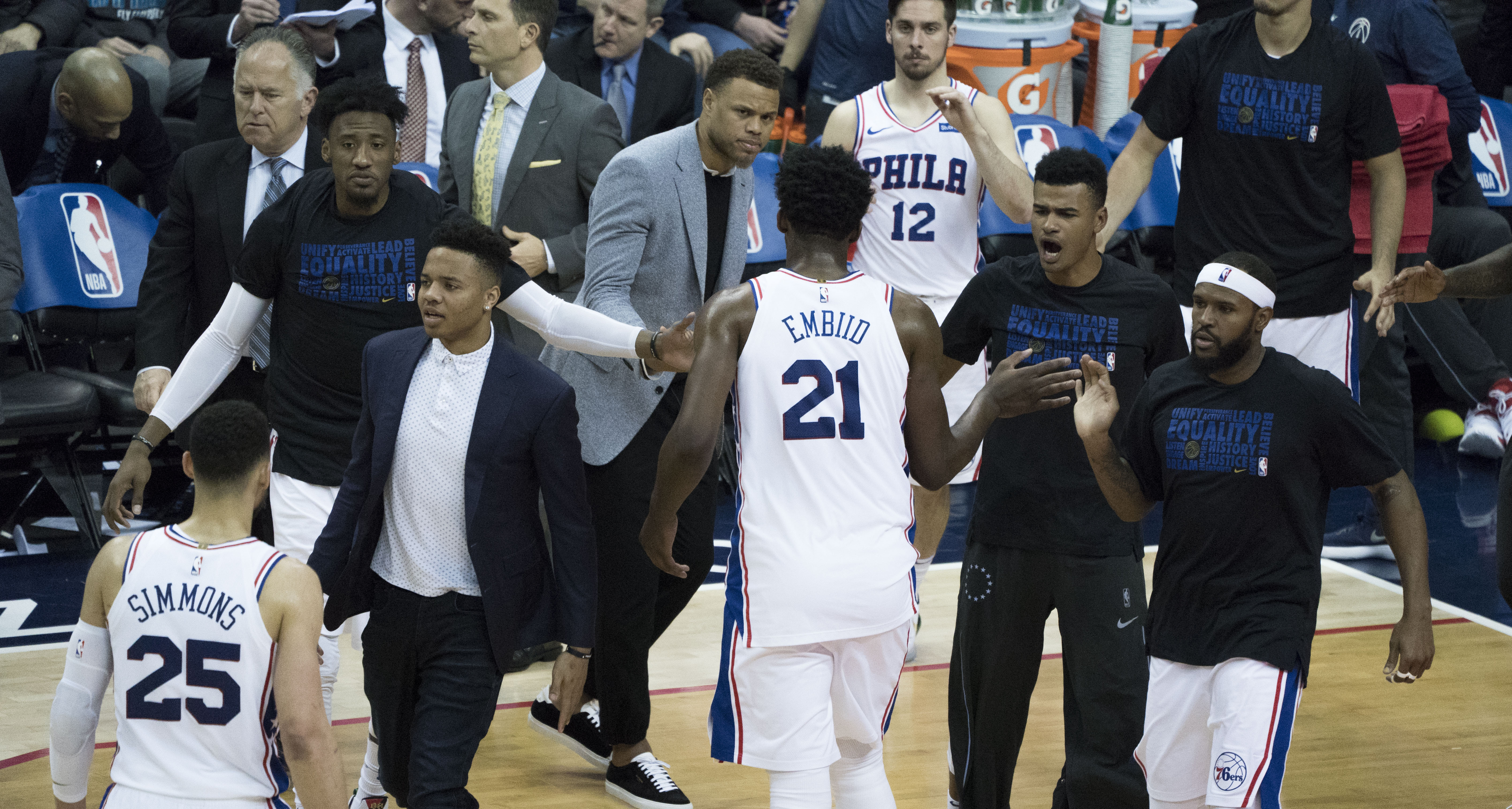
76ers players during a timeout vs the Wizards

2017–18 Philadelphia 76ers roster
Players

Pos.	No.	Player	Height	Weight	DOB	From
SG	1	Justin Anderson	6 ft 6 in (1.98 m)	230 lb (104 kg)	1993–11–19	Virginia
PG	0	Jerryd Bayless	6 ft 3 in (1.91 m)	200 lb (91 kg)	1988–08–20	Arizona
SG	18	Marco Belinelli	6 ft 5 in (1.96 m)	210 lb (95 kg)	1986–03–25	Italy
SF	33	Robert Covington	6 ft 9 in (2.06 m)	225 lb (102 kg)	1990–12–14	Tennessee State
C	21	Joel Embiid	7 ft 0 in (2.13 m)	250 lb (113 kg)	1994–03–16	Kansas
PG	20	Markelle Fultz	6 ft 4 in (1.93 m)	200 lb (91 kg)	1998–05–29	Washington
C	22	Richaun Holmes	6 ft 10 in (2.08 m)	245 lb (111 kg)	1993–10–15	Bowling Green
PF	23	Ersan İlyasova	6 ft 10 in (2.08 m)	235 lb (107 kg)	1987–05–15	Turkey
SG	11	Demetrius Jackson (TW)	6 ft 1 in (1.85 m)	201 lb (91 kg)	1994–09–07	Notre Dame
PF	5	Amir Johnson	6 ft 9 in (2.06 m)	240 lb (109 kg)	1987–05–01	Westchester HS (CA)
SG	30	Furkan Korkmaz	6 ft 7 in (2.01 m)	202 lb (92 kg)	1997–07–24	Turkey
SF	7	Timothé Luwawu-Cabarrot	6 ft 7 in (2.01 m)	200 lb (91 kg)	1995–05–09	France
PG	12	T. J. McConnell	6 ft 2 in (1.88 m)	190 lb (86 kg)	1992–03–25	Arizona
SG	17	JJ Redick	6 ft 4 in (1.93 m)	200 lb (91 kg)	1984–06–24	Duke
PF	9	Dario Šarić	6 ft 11 in (2.11 m)	225 lb (102 kg)	1994–04–08	Croatia
PG	25	Ben Simmons	6 ft 10 in (2.08 m)	230 lb (104 kg)	1996–07–20	LSU

Coaches
Head coach
- Brett Brown
Assistant(s)
- Jim O'Brien
- Lloyd Pierce
- Billy Lange
- Kevin Young
- John Bryant (player development)
- John Townsend (shooting coach)

Legend
- (DP) Unsigned draft pick
- (FA) Free agent
- (S) Suspended
- (GL) On assignment to G League affiliate
- (TW) Two-way affiliate player
- Injured

Roster
Updated: 2018–03–26

== Player statistics ==
Legend
GP	Games played	GS	Games started	MPG	Minutes per game
FG%	Field-goal percentage	3P%	3-point field-goal percentage	FT%	Free-throw percentage
RPG	Rebounds per game	APG	Assists per game	SPG	Steals per game
BPG	Blocks per game	PPG	Points per game

=== Regular season ===
Player	GP	GS	MPG	FG%	3P%	FT%	RPG	APG	SPG	BPG	PPG
Ben Simmons	81	81	33.7	.545	.000	.560	8.1	8.2	1.7	.9	15.8
Robert Covington	80	80	31.7	.413	.369	.853	5.4	2.0	1.7	.9	12.6
Dario Šarić	78	73	29.6	.453	.393	.860	6.7	2.6	.7	.3	14.6
T. J. McConnell	76	1	22.4	.499	.435	.795	3.0	4.0	1.2	.2	6.3
Amir Johnson	74	18	15.8	.538	.313	.612	4.5	1.6	.6	.6	4.6
JJ Redick	70	70	30.2	.460	.420	.904	2.5	3.0	.5	.1	17.1
Joel Embiid	63	63	30.3	.483	.308	.769	11.0	3.2	.6	1.8	22.9
Timothé Luwawu-Cabarrot	52	7	15.5	.375	.335	.793	1.4	1.0	.2	.1	5.8
Richaun Holmes	48	2	15.5	.560	.129	.661	4.4	1.3	.4	.6	6.5
Jerryd Bayless	39	11	23.7	.416	.370	.795	2.1	1.4	.6	.2	7.9
Justin Anderson	38	0	13.7	.431	.330	.737	2.4	.7	.4	.2	6.2
Trevor Booker^{†}	33	0	15.0	.560	.286	.821	3.7	.8	.5	.3	4.7
Marco Belinelli^{†}	28	1	26.3	.495	.385	.870	1.8	1.6	.7	.3	13.6
Ersan İlyasova^{†}	23	3	24.1	.439	.361	.733	6.7	1.7	.7	.4	10.8
Markelle Fultz	14	0	18.1	.405	.000	.476	3.1	3.8	.9	.3	7.1
Furkan Korkmaz	14	0	5.7	.286	.294	.500	.8	.3	.1	.1	1.6
James Young	6	0	10.2	.357	.300	.667	.3	.3	.0	.0	2.8
Nik Stauskas^{†}	6	0	7.5	.250	.000	1.000	.2	.2	.7	.0	.7
James Michael McAdoo	3	0	6.0	.286	.286	1.000	.7	.0	.0	.3	2.7
Demetrius Jackson^{†}	3	0	5.7	.750	1.000	.500	.3	1.3	.3	.0	2.7
Larry Drew II^{†}	3	0	5.0	.143	.000		.3	.7	.0	.0	.7
Jacob Pullen	3	0	2.0	.500	.000		.0	.0	.0	.0	.7
Jahlil Okafor^{†}	2	0	12.5	.444		.500	4.5	.5	.0	1.0	5.0

=== Playoffs ===
Player	GP	GS	MPG	FG%	3P%	FT%	RPG	APG	SPG	BPG	PPG
Ben Simmons	10	10	36.9	.488	.000	.707	9.4	7.7	1.7	.8	16.3
JJ Redick	10	10	34.2	.444	.347	.857	1.5	2.6	.8	.1	18.2
Dario Šarić	10	10	32.9	.421	.385	.850	7.3	3.5	1.0	.4	17.2
Robert Covington	10	8	28.1	.325	.313	.750	5.3	2.5	1.1	.9	8.1
T. J. McConnell	10	2	15.5	.694	.667	.600	2.6	2.3	.6	.0	5.5
Ersan İlyasova	10	1	23.3	.429	.290	.571	7.6	1.3	.7	.4	9.3
Marco Belinelli	10	0	27.3	.406	.348	.871	2.1	2.0	.7	.0	12.9
Joel Embiid	8	8	34.8	.435	.276	.705	12.6	3.0	.9	1.8	21.4
Amir Johnson	8	1	11.8	.524		.800	2.9	1.1	.3	.1	3.3
Justin Anderson	7	0	4.7	.375	.286		1.3	.0	.1	.0	1.1
Markelle Fultz	3	0	7.7	.143		.750	1.0	1.7	.7	.0	1.7
Richaun Holmes	3	0	3.7	.000			.3	.3	.0	.0	.0
Furkan Korkmaz	1	0	2.0	1.000	1.000		.0	.0	.0	.0	3.0
Jerryd Bayless	1	0	2.0				.0	.0	.0	.0	.0

- ^{†} Denotes player spent time with another team in the season. Stats reflect time with the 76ers only.

== Transactions ==
=== Trades ===
June 19, 2017	To Philadelphia 76ers Markelle Fultz (Pick 1)	To Boston Celtics Jayson Tatum (Pick 3); 2018 first-round pick (2 through 5 protected from the L.A. Lakers); If pick does not convey in 2018, a first-round pick in 2019 (with protections instead)
June 28, 2017	To Philadelphia 76ers 2018 second-round pick Cash considerations	To Houston Rockets Shawn Long
July 6, 2017	To Philadelphia 76ers Cash considerations	To Milwaukee Bucks Sterling Brown (Pick 46)
July 6, 2017	To Philadelphia 76ers Cash considerations	To Los Angeles Clippers Jawun Evans (Pick 39)
December 7, 2017	To Philadelphia 76ers Trevor Booker	To Brooklyn Nets Jahlil Okafor; Nik Stauskas; 2019 second-round pick

=== Free agents ===
==== Re-signed ====
Player	Signed
Joel Embiid	Five-year, $148 million extension

==== Additions ====
Player	Signed	Former Team
Furkan Korkmaz	July 4, 2017	(Turkey) Anadolu Efes
JJ Redick	July 8, 2017	Los Angeles Clippers
Amir Johnson	July 8, 2017	Boston Celtics
James Blackmon Jr.	August 30, 2017	Indiana Hoosiers
James Michael McAdoo	Two-way contract	Golden State Warriors
James Young	Two-Way contract	Wisconsin Herd
Larry Drew II	Signed 10-day contract	Sioux Falls Skyforce

==== Subtractions ====
Player	Reason Left	New Team
Gerald Henderson	Waived	
Alex Poythress	Unrestricted free agent	Indiana Pacers / Fort Wayne Mad Ants
Jacob Pullen	Waived	(Iran) Mahram Tehran
James Michael McAdoo	Waived	

== Awards and honors ==
Player	Award	Notes
Joel Embiid	All-Star	1st All-Star appearance, first 76er voted to All-Star game since 2013
