= 2017–18 Orlando Magic season =

NBA professional basketball team season

- Head coach: Frank Vogel
- General manager: John Hammond
- Owners: RDV Sports, Inc.
- Arena: Amway Center

Results
- Record: 25–57 (.305)
- Place: Division: 4th (Southeast); Conference: 14th (Eastern)
- Playoff finish: Did not qualify
- Stats at Basketball Reference

Local media
- Television: Fox Sports Florida, Sun Sports
- Radio: WDBO

The 2017–18 Orlando Magic season was the 29th season of the franchise in the National Basketball Association (NBA). On May 23, 2017, the Magic announced that John Hammond would be the new general manager, thus officially ending his tenure with the Milwaukee Bucks. Finishing with a 25–57 record, the Magic extended their postseason drought to six consecutive years. On April 12, 2018, Frank Vogel was fired by the Magic after the conclusion of the 2017–18 season.

== Draft picks ==
Round	Pick	Player	Position	Nationality	College
1	6	Jonathan Isaac	SF / PF	United States	Florida State
2	33	Wesley Iwundu	SF	United States	Kansas State
2	35	Ivan Rabb	PF	United States	California

The Magic entered the draft with one original first-round selection and two second-round selections, the higher of which was acquired from the Los Angeles Lakers as part of the 2012 Dwight Howard trade.

== Roster ==
2017–18 Orlando Magic roster
Players

Pos.	No.	Player	Height	Weight	DOB	From
G	4	Arron Afflalo	6 ft 5 in (1.96 m)	210 lb (95 kg)	1985-10-15	UCLA
F	0	Jamel Artis (TW)	6 ft 7 in (2.01 m)	213 lb (97 kg)	1993-01-12	Pittsburgh
G	14	D. J. Augustin	6 ft 0 in (1.83 m)	183 lb (83 kg)	1987-11-10	Texas
F	24	Khem Birch	6 ft 9 in (2.06 m)	220 lb (100 kg)	1992-09-28	UNLV
C	11	Bismack Biyombo	6 ft 9 in (2.06 m)	255 lb (116 kg)	1992-08-28	DR Congo
G/F	10	Evan Fournier	6 ft 7 in (2.01 m)	205 lb (93 kg)	1992-10-29	INSEP
F	00	Aaron Gordon	6 ft 9 in (2.06 m)	220 lb (100 kg)	1995-09-16	Arizona
G/F	8	Mario Hezonja	6 ft 8 in (2.03 m)	218 lb (99 kg)	1995-02-25	Croatia
F	1	Jonathan Isaac	6 ft 10 in (2.08 m)	210 lb (95 kg)	1997-10-03	Florida State
G	25	Wes Iwundu	6 ft 7 in (2.01 m)	195 lb (88 kg)	1994-12-20	Kansas State
G	7	Shelvin Mack	6 ft 3 in (1.91 m)	203 lb (92 kg)	1990-04-22	Butler
G	15	Rodney Purvis	6 ft 4 in (1.93 m)	205 lb (93 kg)	1994-02-14	Connecticut
G/F	31	Terrence Ross	6 ft 7 in (2.01 m)	206 lb (93 kg)	1991-02-05	Washington
G	17	Jonathon Simmons	6 ft 6 in (1.98 m)	195 lb (88 kg)	1989-09-14	Houston
F/C	5	Marreese Speights	6 ft 10 in (2.08 m)	255 lb (116 kg)	1987-08-04	Florida
C	9	Nikola Vučević	7 ft 0 in (2.13 m)	260 lb (118 kg)	1990-10-24	USC

Coaches
Head coach
- Frank Vogel
Assistant(s)
- Chad Forcier
- Jay Hernandez
- Matt Hill
- Corliss Williamson

Legend
- (DP) Unsigned draft pick
- (FA) Free agent
- (S) Suspended
- (GL) On assignment to G League affiliate
- (TW) Two-way affiliate player
- Injured

Roster
Updated: March 28, 2018

== Standings ==
=== Division ===
Southeast Division	W	L	PCT	GB	Home	Road	Div	GP
y – Miami Heat	44	38	.537	–	26‍–‍15	18‍–‍23	11–5	82
x – Washington Wizards	43	39	.524	1.0	23‍–‍18	20‍–‍21	8–8	82
Charlotte Hornets	36	46	.439	8.0	21‍–‍20	15‍–‍26	11–5	82
Orlando Magic	25	57	.305	19.0	17‍–‍24	8‍–‍33	5–11	82
Atlanta Hawks	24	58	.293	20.0	16‍–‍25	8‍–‍33	5–11	82

=== Conference ===
Eastern Conference
#	Team	W	L	PCT	GB	GP
1	c – Toronto Raptors *	59	23	.720	–	82
2	x – Boston Celtics	55	27	.671	4.0	82
3	x – Philadelphia 76ers	52	30	.634	7.0	82
4	y – Cleveland Cavaliers *	50	32	.610	9.0	82
5	x – Indiana Pacers	48	34	.585	11.0	82
6	y – Miami Heat *	44	38	.537	15.0	82
7	x – Milwaukee Bucks	44	38	.537	15.0	82
8	x – Washington Wizards	43	39	.524	16.0	82
9	Detroit Pistons	39	43	.476	20.0	82
10	Charlotte Hornets	36	46	.439	23.0	82
11	New York Knicks	29	53	.354	30.0	82
12	Brooklyn Nets	28	54	.341	31.0	82
13	Chicago Bulls	27	55	.329	32.0	82
14	Orlando Magic	25	57	.305	34.0	82
15	Atlanta Hawks	24	58	.293	35.0	82

== Game log ==
=== Preseason ===
2017 pre-season game log
Total: 3–3 (Home: 2–1; Road: 1–2)
Pre-season: 3–3 (home: 2–1; road: 1–2)

Game	Date	Team	Score	High points	High rebounds	High assists	Location Attendance	Record
1	October 2	@ Memphis	L 84–92	Jonathan Isaac (15)	Wesley Iwundu (6)	Evan Fournier (5)	FedExForum; 12,986	0–1
2	October 5	Dallas	W 112–89	Aaron Gordon (17)	Aaron Gordon (10)	Elfrid Payton (5)	Amway Center; 15,849	1–1
3	October 7	Miami	W 93–90	Aaron Gordon (19)	Bismack Biyombo (9)	Elfrid Payton (9)	Amway Center; 18,428	2–1
4	October 9	@ Dallas	L 96–99	D. J. Augustin (24)	Nikola Vučević (14)	Arron Afflalo (7)	American Airlines Center; 16,055	2–2
5	October 10	@ San Antonio	W 103–98	Aaron Gordon (27)	Aaron Gordon (11)	Jonathon Simmons (10)	AT&T Center; 17,671	3–2
6	October 13	Cleveland	L 106–113	Aaron Gordon (21)	Bismack Biyombo (9)	Elfrid Payton (6)	Amway Center; 19,503	3–3

2017–18 season schedule

=== Regular season ===
2017–18 game log
Total: 25–57 (Home: 17–24; Road: 8–33)
October: 5–2 (home: 3–0; road: 2–2)

Game	Date	Team	Score	High points	High rebounds	High assists	Location Attendance	Record
1	October 18	Miami	W 116–109	Evan Fournier (23)	Nikola Vučević (12)	Elfrid Payton (9)	Amway Center; 18,846	1–0
2	October 20	@ Brooklyn	L 121–126	Nikola Vučević (41)	Nikola Vučević (12)	Augustin, Fournier (5)	Barclays Center; 16,144	1–1
3	October 21	@ Cleveland	W 114–93	Nikola Vučević (23)	Nikola Vučević (7)	D. J. Augustin (10)	Quicken Loans Arena; 20,562	2–1
4	October 24	Brooklyn	W 125–121	Aaron Gordon (41)	Aaron Gordon (14)	D. J. Augustin (6)	Amway Center; 16,015	3–1
5	October 27	San Antonio	W 114–87	Evan Fournier (25)	Bismack Biyombo (8)	D. J. Augustin (6)	Amway Center; 17,337	4–1
6	October 29	@ Charlotte	L 113–120	Jonathon Simmons (27)	Nikola Vučević (11)	Augustin, Fournier (5)	Spectrum Center; 15,531	4–2
7	October 30	@ New Orleans	W 115–99	Fournier, Simmons, Vučević (20)	Nikola Vučević (8)	Augustin, Fournier, Mack, Simmons (4)	Smoothie King Center; 14,004	5–2

November : 4–11 (home: 2–4; road: 2–7)

Game	Date	Team	Score	High points	High rebounds	High assists	Location Attendance	Record
8	November 1	@ Memphis	W 101–99	Evan Fournier (22)	Evan Fournier (8)	Shelvin Mack (8)	FedExForum; 15,434	6–2
9	November 3	Chicago	L 83–105	Evan Fournier (21)	Aaron Gordon (7)	Shelvin Mack (8)	Amway Center; 19,171	6–3
10	November 5	Boston	L 88–104	Aaron Gordon (18)	Aaron Gordon (12)	Nikola Vučević (7)	Amway Center; 17,731	6–4
11	November 8	New York	W 112–99	Nikola Vučević (24)	Elfrid Payton (6)	Elfrid Payton (11)	Amway Center; 18,500	7–4
12	November 10	@ Phoenix	W 128–112	Aaron Gordon (22)	Gordon, Vučević (7)	Elfrid Payton (7)	Talking Stick Resort Arena; 16,507	8–4
13	November 11	@ Denver	L 107–125	Marreese Speights (19)	Arron Afflalo (8)	Shelvin Mack (8)	Pepsi Center; 16,688	8–5
14	November 13	@ Golden State	L 100–110	Nikola Vučević (20)	Aaron Gordon (10)	Shelvin Mack (6)	Oracle Arena; 19,596	8–6
15	November 15	@ Portland	L 94–99	Evan Fournier (22)	Nikola Vučević (10)	Elfrid Payton (5)	Moda Center; 19,206	8–7
16	November 18	Utah	L 85–125	Aaron Gordon (18)	Aaron Gordon (9)	Arron Afflalo (4)	Amway Center; 19,157	8–8
17	November 20	Indiana	L 97–105	Nikola Vučević (25)	Nikola Vučević (13)	Elfrid Payton (7)	Amway Center; 17,239	8–9
18	November 22	@ Minnesota	L 118–124	Aaron Gordon (26)	Nikola Vučević (14)	Elfrid Payton (13)	Target Center; 16,402	8–10
19	November 24	@ Boston	L 103–118	Jonathon Simmons (14)	Nikola Vučević (11)	Shelvin Mack (8)	TD Garden; 18,624	8–11
20	November 25	@ Philadelphia	L 111–130	Elfrid Payton (22)	Nikola Vučević (14)	Elfrid Payton (9)	Wells Fargo Center; 20,585	8–12
21	November 27	@ Indiana	L 109–121	Jonathon Simmons (21)	Nikola Vučević (12)	Elfrid Payton (5)	Bankers Life Fieldhouse; 12,501	8–13
22	November 29	Oklahoma City	W 121–108	Aaron Gordon (40)	Aaron Gordon (15)	Nikola Vučević (7)	Amway Center; 17,797	9–13

December : 3–12 (home: 2–6; road: 1–6)

Game	Date	Team	Score	High points	High rebounds	High assists	Location Attendance	Record
23	December 1	Golden State	L 112–133	Aaron Gordon (29)	Biyombo, Gordon, Vučević (7)	Elfrid Payton (9)	Amway Center; 18,846	9–14
24	December 3	@ New York	W 105–100	Nikola Vučević (34)	Nikola Vučević (12)	Elfrid Payton (5)	Madison Square Garden; 19,082	10–14
25	December 4	@ Charlotte	L 94–104	Evan Fournier (18)	Nikola Vučević (8)	Elfrid Payton (7)	Spectrum Center; 14,419	10–15
26	December 6	Atlanta	W 110–106 (OT)	Evan Fournier (27)	Nikola Vučević (16)	Elfrid Payton (6)	Amway Center; 16,167	11–15
27	December 8	Denver	L 89–103	Simmons, Vučević (21)	Nikola Vučević (17)	Elfrid Payton (6)	Amway Center; 16,024	11–16
28	December 9	@ Atlanta	L 110–117	Nikola Vučević (31)	Nikola Vučević (13)	Nikola Vučević (10)	Philips Arena; 12,719	11–17
29	December 13	L.A. Clippers	L 95–106	Jonathon Simmons (20)	Nikola Vučević (12)	Jonathon Simmons (8)	Amway Center; 16,011	11–18
30	December 15	Portland	L 88–95	Nikola Vučević (26)	Nikola Vučević (14)	D. J. Augustin (4)	Amway Center; 16,963	11–19
31	December 17	@ Detroit	L 110–114	Mario Hezonja (28)	Nikola Vučević (14)	Payton, Simmons, Vučević (7)	Little Caesars Arena; 16,312	11–20
32	December 20	@ Chicago	L 94–112	Nikola Vučević (18)	Nikola Vučević (10)	Elfrid Payton (8)	United Center; 20,285	11–21
33	December 22	New Orleans	L 97–111	Jonathon Simmons (22)	Simmons, Vučević (8)	Elfrid Payton (6)	Amway Center; 16,922	11–22
34	December 23	@ Washington	L 103–130	Elfrid Payton (30)	Payne, Payton (5)	Elfrid Payton (10)	Capital One Arena; 17,218	11–23
35	December 26	@ Miami	L 89–107	Elfrid Payton (19)	Bismack Biyombo (12)	Elfrid Payton (6)	American Airlines Arena; 19,600	11–24
36	December 28	Detroit	W 102–89	Elfrid Payton (19)	Bismack Biyombo (13)	Elfrid Payton (8)	Amway Center; 18,846	12–24
37	December 30	Miami	L 111–117	Aaron Gordon (39)	Bismack Biyombo (10)	Elfrid Payton (13)	Amway Center; 18,846	12–25

January : 3–10 (home: 2–3; road: 1–7)

Game	Date	Team	Score	High points	High rebounds	High assists	Location Attendance	Record
38	January 1	@ Brooklyn	L 95–98	Aaron Gordon (20)	Bismack Biyombo (17)	Elfrid Payton (7)	Barclays Center; 16,164	12–26
39	January 3	Houston	L 98–116	Aaron Gordon (16)	Mario Hezonja (9)	Shelvin Mack (7)	Amway Center; 18,588	12–27
40	January 6	Cleveland	L 127–131	Aaron Gordon (30)	Bismack Biyombo (11)	D. J. Augustin (7)	Amway Center; 18,997	12–28
41	January 9	@ Dallas	L 99–114	Aaron Gordon (19)	Marreese Speights (10)	D. J. Augustin (5)	American Airlines Center; 19,306	12–29
42	January 10	@ Milwaukee	L 103–110	Evan Fournier (21)	Bismack Biyombo (9)	Elfrid Payton (7)	BMO Harris Bradley Center; 14,543	12–30
43	January 12	@ Washington	L 119–125	Elfrid Payton (27)	Bismack Biyombo (13)	Elfrid Payton (8)	Capital One Arena; 18,171	12–31
44	January 16	Minnesota	W 108–102	Evan Fournier (32)	Bismack Biyombo (16)	D. J. Augustin (6)	Amway Center; 18,589	13–31
45	January 18	@ Cleveland	L 103–104	Elfrid Payton (19)	Bismack Biyombo (10)	Elfrid Payton (8)	Quicken Loans Arena; 20,502	13–32
46	January 21	@ Boston	W 103–95	Elfrid Payton (22)	Aaron Gordon (13)	Gordon, Mack, Simmons (4)	TD Garden; 18,624	14–32
47	January 23	Sacramento	L 99–105	Evan Fournier (22)	Aaron Gordon (12)	Elfrid Payton (7)	Amway Center; 18,846	14–33
48	January 27	@ Indiana	L 112–114	Aaron Gordon (22)	Aaron Gordon (11)	Mack, Payton (5)	Bankers Life Fieldhouse; 17,923	14–34
49	January 30	@ Houston	L 107–114	Hezonja, Speights (17)	Biyombo, Mack (6)	Evan Fournier (5)	Toyota Center; 18,055	14–35
50	January 31	L.A. Lakers	W 127–105	Marreese Speights (21)	Elfrid Payton (7)	Shelvin Mack (7)	Amway Center; 18,553	15–35

February : 3–8 (home: 2–5; road: 1–3)

Game	Date	Team	Score	High points	High rebounds	High assists	Location Attendance	Record
51	February 3	Washington	L 98–115	Hezonja, Simmons (15)	Khem Birch (8)	Elfrid Payton (4)	Amway Center; 18,846	15–36
52	February 5	@ Miami	W 111–109	Mario Hezonja (20)	Arron Afflalo (6)	Elfrid Payton (7)	American Airlines Arena; 19,600	16–36
53	February 6	Cleveland	W 116–98	Jonathon Simmons (34)	Bismack Biyombo (8)	Elfrid Payton (8)	Amway Center; 18,846	17–36
54	February 8	Atlanta	W 100–98	Evan Fournier (22)	Mario Hezonja (10)	D. J. Augustin (9)	Amway Center; 16,125	18–36
55	February 10	Milwaukee	L 104–111	Mario Hezonja (23)	Khem Birch (9)	Shelvin Mack (10)	Amway Center; 18,347	18–37
56	February 12	@ Chicago	L 101–105	Mario Hezonja (24)	Khem Birch (8)	Shelvin Mack (6)	United Center; 18,611	18–38
57	February 14	Charlotte	L 102–104	Mario Hezonja (21)	Mario Hezonja (10)	D. J. Augustin (4)	Amway Center; 18,428	18–39
All-Star Break
58	February 22	New York	L 113–120	Evan Fournier (25)	Nikola Vučević (6)	Fournier, Gordon, Simmons (5)	Amway Center; 18,846	18–40
59	February 24	@ Philadelphia	L 105–116	Aaron Gordon (20)	Nikola Vučević (9)	Aaron Gordon (7)	Wells Fargo Center; 20,594	18–41
60	February 26	@ Oklahoma City	L 105–112	Fournier, Simmons (19)	Gordon, Vučević (7)	D. J. Augustin (9)	Chesapeake Energy Arena; 18,203	18–42
61	February 28	Toronto	L 104–117	Fournier, Hezonja (17)	Bismack Biyombo (11)	D. J. Augustin (6)	Amway Center; 17,328	18–43

March : 4–10 (home: 4–5; road: 0–5)

Game	Date	Team	Score	High points	High rebounds	High assists	Location Attendance	Record
62	March 2	Detroit	W 115–106 (OT)	Aaron Gordon (27)	Aaron Gordon (13)	D. J. Augustin (9)	Amway Center; 17,223	19–43
63	March 3	Memphis	W 107–100	Fournier, Vučević (19)	Aaron Gordon (8)	D. J. Augustin (5)	Amway Center; 17,875	20–43
64	March 5	@ Utah	L 80–94	Nikola Vučević (15)	Nikola Vučević (12)	D. J. Augustin (5)	Vivint Smart Home Arena; 18,306	20–44
65	March 7	@ L.A. Lakers	L 107–108	Aaron Gordon (28)	Aaron Gordon (14)	D. J. Augustin (8)	Staples Center; 18,997	20–45
66	March 9	@ Sacramento	L 88–94	Jonathon Simmons (25)	Bismack Biyombo (7)	D. J. Augustin (7)	Golden 1 Center; 17,583	20–46
67	March 10	@ L.A. Clippers	L 105–113	Jonathon Simmons (24)	Nikola Vučević (10)	Jonathon Simmons (7)	Staples Center; 16,561	20–47
68	March 13	@ San Antonio	L 72–108	Simmons, Vučević (10)	Nikola Vučević (10)	D. J. Augustin (6)	AT&T Center; 18,418	20–48
69	March 14	Milwaukee	W 126–117	Jonathon Simmons (35)	Birch, Vučević (9)	Nikola Vučević (9)	Amway Center; 17,713	21–48
70	March 16	Boston	L 83–92	Shelvin Mack (16)	Biyombo, Mack (7)	D. J. Augustin (4)	Amway Center; 18,981	21–49
71	March 20	Toronto	L 86–93	Shelvin Mack (16)	Nikola Vučević (9)	D. J. Augustin (10)	Amway Center; 16,228	21–50
72	March 22	Philadelphia	L 98–118	Rodney Purvis (19)	Aaron Gordon (11)	Shelvin Mack (6)	Amway Center; 17,881	21–51
73	March 24	Phoenix	W 105–99	Aaron Gordon (29)	Gordon, Vučević (11)	D. J. Augustin (10)	Amway Center; 17,393	22–51
74	March 28	Brooklyn	L 104–111	Nikola Vučević (24)	Nikola Vučević (15)	Shelvin Mack (6)	Amway Center; 16,517	22–52
75	March 30	Chicago	L 82–90	Aaron Gordon (18)	Nikola Vučević (14)	D. J. Augustin (4)	Amway Center; 18,918	22–53

April : 3–4 (home: 2–1; road: 1–3)

Game	Date	Team	Score	High points	High rebounds	High assists	Location Attendance	Record
76	April 1	@ Atlanta	L 88–94	D. J. Augustin (20)	Nikola Vučević (14)	Shelvin Mack (5)	Philips Arena; 13,587	22–54
77	April 3	@ New York	W 97–73	Mario Hezonja (19)	Nikola Vučević (10)	Shelvin Mack (8)	Madison Square Garden; 19,812	23–54
78	April 4	Dallas	W 105–100	Aaron Gordon (20)	Bismack Biyombo (12)	Shelvin Mack (9)	Amway Center; 18,112	24–54
79	April 6	Charlotte	L 100–137	D. J. Augustin (19)	Bismack Biyombo (8)	Shelvin Mack (11)	Amway Center; 17,018	24–55
80	April 8	@ Toronto	L 101–112	Aaron Gordon (16)	Khem Birch (12)	Mario Hezonja (5)	Air Canada Centre; 19,948	24–56
81	April 9	@ Milwaukee	L 86–102	Nikola Vučević (17)	Nikola Vučević (10)	D. J. Augustin (9)	BMO Harris Bradley Center; 18,717	24–57
82	April 11	Washington	W 101–92	Mario Hezonja (15)	Khem Birch (9)	Mario Hezonja (6)	Amway Center; 17,598	25–57

2017–18 season schedule

== Player statistics ==
=== Ragular season ===
Player	POS	GP	GS	MP	REB	AST	STL	BLK	PTS	MPG	RPG	APG	SPG	BPG	PPG
Bismack Biyombo	C	82	25	1,495	468	66	21	95	468	18.2	5.7	.8	.3	1.2	5.7
D. J. Augustin	PG	75	36	1,760	160	287	54	0	766	23.5	2.1	3.8	.7	.0	10.2
Mario Hezonja	SF	75	30	1,657	281	106	81	31	722	22.1	3.7	1.4	1.1	.4	9.6
Jonathon Simmons	SG	69	50	2,029	239	171	58	16	962	29.4	3.5	2.5	.8	.2	13.9
Shelvin Mack	PG	69	3	1,365	166	272	54	8	473	19.8	2.4	3.9	.8	.1	6.9
Wes Iwundu	SF	62	12	1,020	137	57	33	12	229	16.5	2.2	.9	.5	.2	3.7
Aaron Gordon	PF	58	57	1,909	457	136	59	45	1,022	32.9	7.9	2.3	1.0	.8	17.6
Evan Fournier	SF	57	57	1,837	180	165	47	16	1,013	32.2	3.2	2.9	.8	.3	17.8
Nikola Vučević	C	57	57	1,683	523	191	56	62	939	29.5	9.2	3.4	1.0	1.1	16.5
Arron Afflalo	SG	53	3	682	66	30	4	9	179	12.9	1.2	.6	.1	.2	3.4
Marreese Speights	C	52	3	675	133	40	8	22	402	13.0	2.6	.8	.2	.4	7.7
Elfrid Payton^{†}	PG	44	44	1,257	174	275	64	16	573	28.6	4.0	6.3	1.5	.4	13.0
Khem Birch	C	42	0	578	180	34	15	21	178	13.8	4.3	.8	.4	.5	4.2
Jonathan Isaac	PF	27	10	536	99	18	33	30	145	19.9	3.7	.7	1.2	1.1	5.4
Terrence Ross	SG	24	20	600	73	38	27	11	209	25.0	3.0	1.6	1.1	.5	8.7
Rodney Purvis	SG	16	2	290	27	17	3	3	96	18.1	1.7	1.1	.2	.2	6.0
Jamel Artis	SG	15	1	279	38	18	2	3	77	18.6	2.5	1.2	.1	.2	5.1
Adreian Payne	PF	5	0	43	9	0	2	0	21	8.6	1.8	.0	.4	.0	4.2
Rashad Vaughn^{†}	SG	5	0	35	4	0	1	0	5	7.0	.8	.0	.2	.0	1.0

- ^{†} Denotes player spent time with another team in the season. Stats reflect time with the Magic only.

== Transactions ==
=== Trades ===
May 25, 2017	To Orlando Magic (United States) Jeff Weltman (President of Basketball Operations)	To Toronto Raptors Least favorable of Orlando's two 2018 second round picks^{[a]}

- ^{a} As part of the conditions in the 2013 four-way trade that saw Dwight Howard dealt to the Los Angeles Lakers, Orlando retains the 2018 second round pick of Los Angeles. Toronto will receive one of Orlando's two picks.

=== Free agency ===
==== Re-signed ====
Player	Signed
Damjan Rudež	Training camp deal

==== Additions ====
Player	Signed	Former team
Shelvin Mack	2-year contract worth $12 million	Utah Jazz
Jonathon Simmons	3-year contract worth $20 million	San Antonio Spurs
Arron Afflalo	1-year contract worth $2.3 million	Sacramento Kings
Marreese Speights	1-year contract worth $2.1 million	Los Angeles Clippers
Khem Birch	2-year contract terms undisclosed	(Greece) Olympiacos Piraeus
Adreian Payne	Two-way contract	Minnesota Timberwolves
Troy Caupain		Cincinnati Bearcats
Kalin Lucas		Erie BayHawks (G League)
Jamel Artis	Two-way contract	Pittsburgh Panthers / New York Knicks

==== Subtractions ====
Player	Reason left	New team
Jeff Green	1-year contract worth $2.3 million	Cleveland Cavaliers
Jodie Meeks	2-year contract worth $7 million	Washington Wizards
Stephen Zimmerman	Waived	Los Angeles Lakers
C. J. Watson	Waived	(Turkey) Muratbey Uşak Sportif
Marcus Georges-Hunt	Waived	Minnesota Timberwolves
Patricio Garino	Waived	(Spain) Saski Baskonia
Damjan Rudež	Waived	(Spain) Valencia Basket
Adreian Payne	Waived / Involved with sexual assault case	(Greece) Panathinaikos Athens Superfoods B.C.
