= 2017–18 Chicago Bulls season =

NBA professional basketball team season

- Head coach: Fred Hoiberg
- President: Michael Reinsdorf
- General manager: Gar Forman
- Owner: Jerry Reinsdorf
- Arena: United Center

Results
- Record: 27–55 (.329)
- Place: Division: 5th (Central); Conference: 13th (Eastern)
- Playoff finish: Did not qualify
- Stats at Basketball Reference

Local media
- Television: NBC Sports Chicago; WGN
- Radio: WLS; WSCR

The 2017–18 Chicago Bulls season was the 52nd season of the franchise in the National Basketball Association (NBA). For the first time since 2011, All-Star Jimmy Butler was not on the roster as he was traded to the Minnesota Timberwolves in the off-season. On February 1, 2018, months after his confrontation with teammate Bobby Portis, Nikola Mirotić agreed to a trade where he'd be sent alongside a future second round pick to the New Orleans Pelicans in exchange for Ömer Aşık, Tony Allen, Jameer Nelson, and a future first round pick. The Bulls had their first losing season since 2008, and their first 50-loss season since 2004.

Newly acquired Zach LaVine played in just 24 games this season due to knee injuries.

== Draft picks ==
Round	Pick	Player	Position	Nationality	College
1	16	Justin Patton	C	United States	Creighton
2	38	Jordan Bell	PF	United States	Oregon

Entering draft night, the Bulls possessed picks 16 and 38, with the latter being acquired via a trade with the Cleveland Cavaliers. They had traded their original second-round selection to the New York Knicks in 2016 alongside Derrick Rose and Justin Holiday. Exiting draft night, they left with only one draft pick that wasn't even originally theirs to begin with. First, they traded away All-Star shooting guard Jimmy Butler and their #16 pick (which became redshirted freshman center Justin Patton from Creighton University), to the Minnesota Timberwolves for Zach LaVine, Kris Dunn, and the Timberwolves' #7 pick in the draft, which became the star Finnish freshman center/power forward Lauri Markkanen from the University of Arizona. As for their own second-round selection on the day of the draft, one that the Bulls got from Cleveland, they traded away that pick (which was junior power forward Jordan Bell from the University of Oregon) to the defending champion Golden State Warriors in exchange for $3.5 million.

== Roster ==
2017–18 Chicago Bulls roster
Players

Pos.	No.	Player	Height	Weight	DOB	From
G	15	Ryan Arcidiacono (TW)	6 ft 3 in (1.91 m)	195 lb (88 kg)	1994-03-26	Villanova
C	3	Ömer Aşık (injured)	7 ft 0 in (2.13 m)	255 lb (116 kg)	1986-07-04	Turkey
G	9	Antonio Blakeney (TW)	6 ft 4 in (1.93 m)	197 lb (89 kg)	1996-10-04	LSU
G	32	Kris Dunn	6 ft 4 in (1.93 m)	210 lb (95 kg)	1994-03-18	Providence
C	6	Cristiano Felício	6 ft 11 in (2.11 m)	280 lb (127 kg)	1992-07-07	CCSE Prep (CA)
G	2	Jerian Grant	6 ft 4 in (1.93 m)	198 lb (90 kg)	1992-10-09	Notre Dame
G/F	7	Justin Holiday	6 ft 6 in (1.98 m)	185 lb (84 kg)	1989-04-05	Washington
G	0	Sean Kilpatrick	6 ft 4 in (1.93 m)	210 lb (95 kg)	1990-01-06	Cincinnati
G	8	Zach LaVine (injured)	6 ft 5 in (1.96 m)	185 lb (84 kg)	1995-03-10	UCLA
C	42	Robin Lopez	7 ft 0 in (2.13 m)	277 lb (126 kg)	1988-04-01	Stanford
F	24	Lauri Markkanen	7 ft 0 in (2.13 m)	230 lb (104 kg)	1997-05-22	Arizona
G	11	David Nwaba	6 ft 4 in (1.93 m)	219 lb (99 kg)	1993-01-14	Cal Poly
G	22	Cameron Payne	6 ft 3 in (1.91 m)	185 lb (84 kg)	1994-08-08	Murray State
F	5	Bobby Portis	6 ft 11 in (2.11 m)	248 lb (112 kg)	1995-02-10	Arkansas
G/F	45	Denzel Valentine	6 ft 6 in (1.98 m)	214 lb (97 kg)	1993-11-16	Michigan State
F	30	Noah Vonleh	6 ft 9 in (2.06 m)	245 lb (111 kg)	1995-08-24	Indiana
F	16	Paul Zipser	6 ft 8 in (2.03 m)	226 lb (103 kg)	1994-02-18	Germany

Coaches
Head coach
- Fred Hoiberg
Assistant(s)
- Randy Brown
- Nate Loenser
- Pete Myers
- Mike Wilhelm
- Jim Boylen (Associate HC)
- Jeff Tanaka (trainer)

Legend
- (DP) Unsigned draft pick
- (FA) Free agent
- (S) Suspended
- (GL) On assignment to G League affiliate
- (TW) Two-way affiliate player
- Injured

Roster
Updated: March 26, 2018

== Standings ==
=== Division ===
Central Division	W	L	PCT	GB	Home	Road	Div	GP
y – Cleveland Cavaliers	50	32	.610	–	29‍–‍12	21‍–‍20	11–5	82
x – Indiana Pacers	48	34	.585	2.0	27‍–‍14	21‍–‍20	10–6	82
x – Milwaukee Bucks	44	38	.537	6.0	25‍–‍16	19‍–‍22	6–10	82
Detroit Pistons	39	43	.476	11.0	25‍–‍16	14‍–‍27	9–7	82
Chicago Bulls	27	55	.329	23.0	17‍–‍24	10‍–‍31	4–12	82

=== Conference ===
Eastern Conference
#	Team	W	L	PCT	GB	GP
1	c – Toronto Raptors *	59	23	.720	–	82
2	x – Boston Celtics	55	27	.671	4.0	82
3	x – Philadelphia 76ers	52	30	.634	7.0	82
4	y – Cleveland Cavaliers *	50	32	.610	9.0	82
5	x – Indiana Pacers	48	34	.585	11.0	82
6	y – Miami Heat *	44	38	.537	15.0	82
7	x – Milwaukee Bucks	44	38	.537	15.0	82
8	x – Washington Wizards	43	39	.524	16.0	82
9	Detroit Pistons	39	43	.476	20.0	82
10	Charlotte Hornets	36	46	.439	23.0	82
11	New York Knicks	29	53	.354	30.0	82
12	Brooklyn Nets	28	54	.341	31.0	82
13	Chicago Bulls	27	55	.329	32.0	82
14	Orlando Magic	25	57	.305	34.0	82
15	Atlanta Hawks	24	58	.293	35.0	82

== Game log ==
=== Preseason ===
2017 pre-season game log
Total: 3–3 (Home: 1–2; Road: 2–1)
Pre-season: 3–3 (home: 1–2; road: 2–1)

Game	Date	Team	Score	High points	High rebounds	High assists	Location Attendance	Record
1	October 3	@ New Orleans	W 113–109	Cristiano Felicio (15)	Mirotic, Portis (9)	Jerian Grant (9)	Smoothie King Center; 16,962	1–0
2	October 4	@ Dallas	L 71–118	Lopez, Zipser (12)	Justin Holiday (6)	Kris Dunn (6)	American Airlines Center; 17,091	1–1
3	October 6	Milwaukee	W 114–101	Justin Holiday (21)	Bobby Portis (10)	Arcidiacono, Grant, Portis, Valentine (4)	United Center; 17,187	2–1
4	October 8	New Orleans	L 95–108	Denzel Valentine (15)	Bobby Portis (10)	Ryan Arcidiacono (6)	United Center; 17,523	2–2
5	October 10	@ Cleveland	W 108–94	Justin Holiday (28)	Justin Holiday (11)	Jerian Grant (5)	Quicken Loans Arena; 19,042	3–2
6	October 13	Toronto	L 104–125	Justin Holiday (17)	Jerian Grant (9)	Jerian Grant (8)	United Center; 19,677	3–3

2017–18 season schedule

=== Regular season ===
2017–18 game log
Total: 27–55 (Home: 17–24; Road: 10–31)
October: 1–4 (home: 1–2; road: 0–2)

Game	Date	Team	Score	High points	High rebounds	High assists	Location Attendance	Record
1	October 19	@ Toronto	L 100–117	Robin Lopez (18)	Lopez, Markkanen (8)	Jerian Grant (7)	Air Canada Centre; 19,800	0–1
2	October 21	San Antonio	L 77–87	Robin Lopez (16)	Lauri Markkanen (12)	Jerian Grant (5)	United Center; 21,640	0–2
3	October 24	@ Cleveland	L 112–119	Justin Holiday (25)	Lauri Markkanen (8)	Jerian Grant (10)	Quicken Loans Arena; 20,562	0–3
4	October 26	Atlanta	W 91–86	Robin Lopez (16)	Lauri Markkanen (13)	Jerian Grant (7)	United Center; 21,104	1–3
5	October 28	Oklahoma City	L 69–101	Lauri Markkanen (15)	Felicio, Markkanen (8)	Jerian Grant (4)	United Center; 21,706	1–4

November : 2–13 (home: 1–4; road: 1–9)

Game	Date	Team	Score	High points	High rebounds	High assists	Location Attendance	Record
6	November 1	@ Miami	L 91–97	Lauri Markkanen (25)	David Nwaba (11)	Jerian Grant (8)	American Airlines Arena; 19,600	1–5
7	November 3	@ Orlando	W 105–83	Justin Holiday (19)	Robin Lopez (10)	Jerian Grant (6)	Amway Center; 19,171	2–5
8	November 4	New Orleans	L 90–96 (OT)	Justin Holiday (18)	Robin Lopez (9)	Jerian Grant (9)	United Center; 21,254	2–6
9	November 7	@ Toronto	L 114–119	Bobby Portis (21)	Bobby Portis (13)	Jerian Grant (5)	Air Canada Centre; 19,800	2–7
10	November 10	Indiana	L 87–105	Bobby Portis (20)	Bobby Portis (11)	Kris Dunn (5)	United Center; 22,416	2–8
11	November 11	@ San Antonio	L 94–133	Lopez, Portis (17)	Bobby Portis (6)	Jerian Grant (8)	AT&T Center; 18,418	2–9
12	November 15	@ Oklahoma City	L 79–92	Blakeney, Markkanen (16)	Bobby Portis (9)	Dunn, Grant (3)	Chesapeake Energy Arena; 18,203	2–10
13	November 17	Charlotte	W 123–120	Justin Holiday (27)	Lauri Markkanen (7)	Kris Dunn (7)	United Center; 20,493	3–10
14	November 19	@ Phoenix	L 105–113	Lauri Markkanen (26)	Lauri Markkanen (13)	Kris Dunn (6)	Talking Stick Resort Arena; 16,264	3–11
15	November 21	@ LA Lakers	L 94–103	Denzel Valentine (17)	Lauri Markkanen (14)	Kris Dunn (6)	Staples Center; 18,997	3–12
16	November 22	@ Utah	L 80–110	Robin Lopez (15)	Kris Dunn (9)	Grant, Valentine (4)	Vivint Smart Home Arena; 17,434	3–13
17	November 24	@ Golden State	L 94–143	Jerian Grant (21)	Bobby Portis (8)	Kris Dunn (4)	Oracle Arena; 19,596	3–14
18	November 26	Miami	L 93–100	Jerian Grant (24)	Denzel Valentine (13)	Denzel Valentine (7)	United Center; 20,928	3–15
19	November 28	Phoenix	L 99–104	Justin Holiday (25)	Robin Lopez (7)	Kris Dunn (8)	United Center; 18,324	3–16
20	November 30	@ Denver	L 110–111	Lopez, Markkanen (20)	Lauri Markkanen (9)	Jerian Grant (7)	Pepsi Center; 15,156	3–17

December : 10–6 (home: 7–2; road: 3–4)

Game	Date	Team	Score	High points	High rebounds	High assists	Location Attendance	Record
21	December 1	Sacramento	L 106–107	Jerian Grant (17)	David Nwaba (9)	Kris Dunn (8)	United Center; 19,268	3–18
22	December 4	Cleveland	L 91–113	Kris Dunn (15)	Bobby Portis (9)	Kris Dunn (5)	United Center; 21,323	3–19
23	December 6	@ Indiana	L 96–98	Kris Dunn (18)	Denzel Valentine (8)	Kris Dunn (6)	Bankers Life Fieldhouse; 13,013	3–20
24	December 8	@ Charlotte	W 119–111 (OT)	Lauri Markkanen (24)	Lauri Markkanen (12)	Kris Dunn (12)	Spectrum Center; 14,077	4–20
25	December 9	NY Knicks	W 104–102	Nikola Mirotic (19)	Lauri Markkanen (8)	Jerian Grant (9)	United Center; 20,149	5–20
26	December 11	Boston	W 108–85	Nikola Mirotic (24)	Nikola Mirotic (8)	Jerian Grant (9)	United Center; 19,617	6–20
27	December 13	Utah	W 103–100	Nikola Mirotic (29)	Nikola Mirotic (9)	Kris Dunn (8)	United Center; 18,102	7–20
28	December 15	@ Milwaukee	W 115–109	Bobby Portis (27)	Bobby Portis (12)	Dunn, Holiday (7)	Bradley Center; 16,921	8–20
29	December 18	Philadelphia	W 117–115	Dunn, Mirotic (22)	Nikola Mirotic (13)	Kris Dunn (6)	United Center; 20,796	9–20
30	December 20	Orlando	W 112–94	Denzel Valentine (15)	Denzel Valentine (10)	Kris Dunn (7)	United Center; 20,285	10–20
31	December 21	@ Cleveland	L 112–115	Lauri Markkanen (25)	Justin Holiday (7)	Kris Dunn (14)	Quicken Loans Arena; 20,562	10–21
32	December 23	@ Boston	L 92–117	Bobby Portis (17)	Nikola Mirotic (9)	Kris Dunn (7)	TD Garden; 18,624	10–22
33	December 26	@ Milwaukee	W 115–106	Nikola Mirotic (24)	David Nwaba (9)	Kris Dunn (12)	Bradley Center; 18,717	11–22
34	December 27	NY Knicks	W 92–87	Kris Dunn (17)	Denzel Valentine (9)	Jerian Grant (6)	United Center; 21,883	12–22
35	December 29	Indiana	W 119–107	Lauri Markkanen (32)	Portis, Grant, Markkanen (7)	Jerian Grant (12)	United Center; 21,178	13–22
36	December 31	@ Washington	L 110–114	Nikola Mirotic (21)	Lauri Markkanen (9)	Kris Dunn (11)	Capital One Arena; 20,356	13–23

January : 5–10 (home: 2–6; road: 3–4)

Game	Date	Team	Score	High points	High rebounds	High assists	Location Attendance	Record
37	January 1	Portland	L 120–124 (OT)	Kris Dunn (22)	Nikola Mirotic (10)	Denzel Valentine (6)	United Center; 20,860	13–24
38	January 3	Toronto	L 115–124	Justin Holiday (26)	Lauri Markkanen (12)	Kris Dunn (8)	United Center; 20,056	13–25
39	January 5	@ Dallas	W 127–124	Kris Dunn (32)	Nikola Mirotic (10)	Kris Dunn (9)	American Airlines Center; 20,073	14–25
40	January 6	@ Indiana	L 86–125	Bobby Portis (15)	Markkanen, Valentine (5)	Kris Dunn (8)	Bankers Life Fieldhouse; 17,923	14–26
41	January 8	Houston	L 107–116	Bobby Portis (22)	Markkanen, Valentine (8)	Kris Dunn (8)	United Center; 17,462	14–27
42	January 10	@ NY Knicks	W 122–119 (2OT)	Lauri Markkanen (33)	Lauri Markkanen (10)	Kris Dunn (8)	Madison Square Garden; 19,812	15–27
43	January 13	Detroit	W 107–105	Lauri Markkanen (19)	Kris Dunn (8)	Kris Dunn (8)	United Center; 21,613	16–27
44	January 15	Miami	W 119–111	Justin Holiday (25)	Lauri Markkanen (9)	Kris Dunn (10)	United Center; 20,546	17–27
45	January 17	Golden State	L 112–119	Nikola Mirotic (24)	Lauri Markkanen (8)	Denzel Valentine (7)	United Center; 21,372	17–28
46	January 20	@ Atlanta	W 113–97	Robin Lopez (20)	Zach LaVine (9)	Jerian Grant (6)	Philips Arena; 15,597	18–28
47	January 22	@ New Orleans	L 128–132 (2OT)	Grant, Lopez (22)	Lauri Markkanen (17)	Jerian Grant (13)	Smoothie King Center; 17,101	18–29
48	January 24	@ Philadelphia	L 101–115	Bobby Portis (22)	Bobby Portis (11)	David Nwaba (4)	Wells Fargo Center; 20,547	18–30
49	January 26	LA Lakers	L 103–108	Nikola Mirotic (18)	Markkanen, Valentine (11)	Jerian Grant (8)	United Center; 21,827	18–31
50	January 28	Milwaukee	L 96–110	Denzel Valentine (18)	Lauri Markkanen (10)	Grant, LaVine (4)	United Center; 21,630	18–32
51	January 31	@ Portland	L 108–124	Zach LaVine (23)	Bobby Portis (10)	Grant, Felicio (3)	Moda Center; 19,000	18–33

February : 2–8 (home: 2–3; road: 0–5)

Game	Date	Team	Score	High points	High rebounds	High assists	Location Attendance	Record
52	February 3	@ LA Clippers	L 103–113	Zach LaVine (21)	Bobby Portis (13)	Grant, LaVine (4)	Staples Center; 19,068	18–34
53	February 5	@ Sacramento	L 98–104	Zach LaVine (27)	Bobby Portis (14)	Jerian Grant (5)	Golden 1 Center; 17,583	18–35
54	February 9	Minnesota	W 114–113	Zach LaVine (35)	Jerian Grant (8)	Jerian Grant (11)	United Center; 21,558	19–35
55	February 10	Washington	L 90–101	Justin Holiday (15)	Markkanen, Valentine (10)	Jerian Grant (8)	United Center; 21,112	19–36
56	February 12	Orlando	W 105–101	Lauri Markkanen (21)	Lauri Markkanen (8)	Jerian Grant (7)	United Center; 18,611	20–36
57	February 14	Toronto	L 98–122	Bobby Portis (18)	Markkanen, Nwaba (6)	Jerian Grant (7)	United Center; 21,006	20–37
58	February 22	Philadelphia	L 115–116	Bobby Portis (38)	David Nwaba (9)	Cameron Payne (7)	United Center; 21,312	20–38
59	February 24	@ Minnesota	L 104–122	Zach LaVine (21)	David Nwaba (9)	Zach LaVine (7)	Target Center; 18,978	20–39
60	February 26	@ Brooklyn	L 87–104	Kris Dunn (23)	Denzel Valentine (13)	Kris Dunn (4)	Barclays Center; 15,081	20–40
61	February 27	@ Charlotte	L 103–118	Zach LaVine (21)	Bobby Portis (10)	Cameron Payne (6)	Spectrum Center; 14,521	20–41

March : 5–10 (home: 2–5; road: 3–5)

Game	Date	Team	Score	High points	High rebounds	High assists	Location Attendance	Record
62	March 2	Dallas	W 108–100	Bobby Portis (22)	Lauri Markkanen (12)	Kris Dunn (7)	United Center; 21,017	21–41
63	March 5	Boston	L 89–105	Denzel Valentine (20)	Noah Vonleh (9)	Kris Dunn (4)	United Center; 21,286	21–42
64	March 7	Memphis	W 119–110	Lauri Markkanen (22)	Bobby Portis (10)	Kris Dunn (9)	United Center; 20,210	22–42
65	March 9	@ Detroit	L 83–99	Cameron Payne (17)	Lauri Markkanen (8)	Bobby Portis (5)	Little Caesars Arena; 17,406	22–43
66	March 11	@ Atlanta	W 129–122	LaVine, Portis (21)	Bobby Portis (10)	Denzel Valentine (7)	Philips Arena; 15,266	23–43
67	March 13	LA Clippers	L 106–112	Bobby Portis (19)	Bobby Portis (9)	Kris Dunn (6)	United Center; 20,912	23–44
68	March 15	@ Memphis	W 111–110	Zach LaVine (20)	Noah Vonleh (10)	Cameron Payne (5)	FedExForum; 16,511	24–44
69	March 17	Cleveland	L 109–114	Denzel Valentine (34)	Cristiano Felicio (10)	Cameron Payne (10)	United Center; 22,983	24–45
70	March 19	@ NY Knicks	L 92–110	Cristiano Felicio (17)	Noah Vonleh (12)	Cameron Payne (6)	Madison Square Garden; 18,835	24–46
71	March 21	Denver	L 102–135	Cristiano Felicio (16)	Bobby Portis (8)	Jerian Grant (7)	United Center; 20,671	24–47
72	March 23	Milwaukee	L 105–118	Denzel Valentine (20)	Cristiano Felicio (11)	Cameron Payne (6)	United Center; 21,698	24–48
73	March 24	@ Detroit	L 95–117	Denzel Valentine (18)	Cristiano Felicio (9)	Jerian Grant (10)	Little Caesars Arena; 19,139	24–49
74	March 27	@ Houston	L 86–118	Lauri Markkanen (22)	Noah Vonleh (13)	Grant, Payne, Valentine, Vonleh (3)	Toyota Center; 18,055	24–50
75	March 29	@ Miami	L 92–103	David Nwaba (15)	Noah Vonleh (13)	Cameron Payne (5)	American Airlines Arena; 19,746	24–51
76	March 30	@ Orlando	W 90–82	Kilpatrick, Markkanen (13)	Cristiano Felicio (16)	Cameron Payne (6)	Amway Center; 18,918	25–51

April : 2–4 (home: 2–2; road: 0–2)

Game	Date	Team	Score	High points	High rebounds	High assists	Location Attendance	Record
77	April 1	Washington	W 113–94	Lauri Markkanen (23)	Cristiano Felicio (8)	Jerian Grant (7)	United Center; 20,466	26–51
78	April 3	Charlotte	W 120–114	Lauri Markkanen (24)	David Nwaba (9)	Cameron Payne (7)	United Center; 20,139	27–51
79	April 6	@ Boston	L 104–111	Sean Kilpatrick (24)	Cristiano Felicio (9)	Jerian Grant (8)	TD Garden; 18,624	27–52
80	April 7	Brooklyn	L 96–124	Sean Kilpatrick (20)	Cristiano Felicio (9)	Cameron Payne (5)	United Center; 21,669	27–53
81	April 9	@ Brooklyn	L 105–114	Sean Kilpatrick (16)	David Nwaba (10)	Cameron Payne (6)	Barclays Center; 16,187	27–54
82	April 11	Detroit	L 87–119	Lauri Markkanen (20)	Markkanen, Portis (8)	Cameron Payne (9)	United Center; 21,342	27–55

2017–18 season schedule

== Injuries/Personal games missed ==
Player	Duration		Reason for Missed Time	Games Missed
Player	Start	End	Reason for Missed Time	Games Missed
Zach LaVine	February 4, 2017	January 13, 2018	Tore his ACL while playing with Minnesota.	??
Cameron Payne	September 6, 2017	Unknown (Three-to-four months)	Had surgery on his right foot.	??
Nikola Mirotić	October 17, 2017	December 8, 2017	Hospitalized for engaging in a fight with Bobby Portis.	23
Bobby Portis	October 17, 2017	November 7, 2017	Suspended for punching teammate Nikola Mirotić in his face.	8

== Player statistics ==
Legend
GP	Games played	GS	Games started	MPG	Minutes per game
FG%	Field-goal percentage	3P%	3-point field-goal percentage	FT%	Free-throw percentage
RPG	Rebounds per game	APG	Assists per game	SPG	Steals per game
BPG	Blocks per game	PPG	Points per game

=== Regular season ===
Player	GP	GS	MPG	FG%	3P%	FT%	RPG	APG	SPG	BPG	PPG
Denzel Valentine	77	37	27.2	.417	.386	.745	5.1	3.2	.8	.1	10.2
Jerian Grant	74	26	22.8	.416	.326	.745	2.3	4.6	.9	.1	8.4
Bobby Portis	73	4	22.5	.471	.359	.769	6.8	1.7	.7	.3	13.2
Justin Holiday	72	72	31.5	.371	.359	.823	4.0	2.1	1.1	.4	12.2
David Nwaba	70	21	23.5	.478	.346	.655	4.7	1.5	.8	.4	7.9
Lauri Markkanen	68	68	29.7	.434	.362	.843	7.5	1.2	.6	.6	15.2
Robin Lopez	64	64	26.4	.530	.286	.756	4.5	1.9	.2	.8	11.8
Cristiano Felício	55	16	17.8	.591	.000	.667	4.2	1.0	.3	.2	5.6
Paul Zipser	54	12	15.3	.346	.336	.760	2.4	.9	.4	.3	4.0
Kris Dunn	52	43	29.3	.429	.321	.737	4.3	6.0	2.0	.5	13.4
Cameron Payne	25	14	23.3	.405	.385	.750	2.8	4.5	1.0	.4	8.8
Nikola Mirotić^{†}	25	3	24.9	.474	.429	.823	6.4	1.6	.6	.5	16.8
Zach LaVine	24	24	27.3	.383	.341	.813	3.9	3.0	1.0	.2	16.7
Ryan Arcidiacono	24	0	12.7	.415	.290	.833	1.0	1.5	.5	.0	2.0
Quincy Pondexter	23	1	8.5	.286	.136	.824	1.2	.4	.3	.1	2.0
Noah Vonleh^{†}	21	4	19.0	.413	.300	.481	6.9	1.0	.6	.3	6.9
Antonio Blakeney	19	0	16.5	.371	.288	.769	1.7	1.1	.4	.1	7.9
Kay Felder^{†}	14	0	9.6	.303	.222	.917	1.0	1.4	.2	.1	3.9
Sean Kilpatrick^{†}	9	1	23.8	.439	.396	.813	2.8	1.4	.7	.3	15.4
Ömer Aşık^{†}	4	0	15.3	.333		.000	2.5	.3	.3	.5	1.0
Jarell Eddie^{†}	1	0	3.0	.000	.000		.0	.0	.0	.0	.0

- ^{†} Denotes player spent time with another team in the season. Stats reflect time with the Bulls only.

== Transactions ==
=== Trades ===
June 22, 2017	To Chicago Bulls Kris Dunn; Zach LaVine; Draft right to Lauri Markkanen (pick 7)	To Minnesota Timberwolves Jimmy Butler; Draft right to Justin Patton (pick 16)
February 1, 2018	To Chicago Bulls Ömer Aşık; Tony Allen; Jameer Nelson; 2018 Top 5 protected first round pick Right to swap 2021 second round picks with New Orleans	To New Orleans Pelicans Nikola Mirotić; 2018 second round pick (from New Orleans via Chicago)

=== Free agency ===
==== Re-signed ====
Player	Signed
Cristiano Felício	4-year contract worth $32 million
Nikola Mirotić	2-year contract worth $27 million

==== Additions ====
Player	Signed	Former team
Justin Holiday	2-year contract worth $9 million	New York Knicks
Antonio Blakeney	Two-way contract	Louisiana State Tigers
Ryan Arcidiacono	Two-way contract	Austin Spurs
Diamond Stone	2-year contract worth $2.8 million	New York Knicks
Kay Felder		Cleveland Cavaliers

==== Subtractions ====
Player	Reason left	New team
Isaiah Canaan	Waived	Oklahoma City Thunder
Rajon Rondo	Waived	New Orleans Pelicans
Michael Carter-Williams	Free Agent	Charlotte Hornets
Dwyane Wade	Bought Out	Cleveland Cavaliers
Quincy Pondexter	Waived	Unknown
Tony Allen	Waived	Unknown
