= 2017–18 Miami Heat season =

NBA professional basketball team season

- Division champions
- Head coach: Erik Spoelstra
- President: Pat Riley
- General manager: Andy Elisburg
- Owner: Micky Arison
- Arena: American Airlines Arena

Results
- Record: 44–38 (.537)
- Place: Division: 1st (Southeast); Conference: 6th (Eastern)
- Playoff finish: First Round (lost to 76ers 1–4)
- Stats at Basketball Reference

Local media
- Television: Fox Sports Sun
- Radio: 790 AM, "The Ticket"

The 2017–18 Miami Heat season was the 30th season of the franchise in the National Basketball Association (NBA).

On the February 8, 2018 NBA trade deadline, the Heat re-acquired star shooting guard Dwyane Wade from the Cleveland Cavaliers in exchange for a future second-round draft pick, after losing him to free agency in July 2016.

Despite a loss to the Oklahoma City Thunder on April 9, 2018, the Heat clinched a playoff berth for the eighth time in ten seasons. Furthermore, they won their division on April 11 as a result of an overtime win over the Toronto Raptors, as well as a loss by the Washington Wizards to the Orlando Magic. The Heat finished the regular season with a 44–38 record, which clinched the 6th seed in the Eastern Conference playoffs. This made the Heat the lowest-seeded playoff team to win a division championship since the NBA modified playoff seeding in 2016.

In the playoffs, they faced the 3rd seed Philadelphia 76ers in the first round and were defeated in 5 games.

== Draft picks ==
Round	Pick	Player	Position	Nationality	College/Team
1	14	Edrice "Bam" Adebayo	C	United States	Kentucky

== Roster ==
2017–18 Miami Heat roster
Players

Pos.	No.	Player	Height	Weight	DOB	From
C	13	Bam Adebayo	6 ft 10 in (2.08 m)	255 lb (116 kg)	1997-07-18	Kentucky
SF	22	Luke Babbitt	6 ft 9 in (2.06 m)	225 lb (102 kg)	1989-06-20	Nevada
PG	7	Goran Dragić	6 ft 3 in (1.91 m)	190 lb (86 kg)	1986-05-06	Slovenia
SG	2	Wayne Ellington	6 ft 5 in (1.96 m)	200 lb (91 kg)	1987-11-29	North Carolina
PF	40	Udonis Haslem	6 ft 8 in (2.03 m)	235 lb (107 kg)	1980-06-09	Florida
PF	16	James Johnson	6 ft 9 in (2.06 m)	250 lb (113 kg)	1987-02-20	Wake Forest
PG	8	Tyler Johnson	6 ft 4 in (1.93 m)	190 lb (86 kg)	1992-05-07	Fresno State
SF	5	Derrick Jones (TW)	6 ft 7 in (2.01 m)	200 lb (91 kg)	1997-02-15	UNLV
SG	17	Rodney McGruder	6 ft 4 in (1.93 m)	205 lb (93 kg)	1991-07-29	Kansas State
PF	25	Jordan Mickey	6 ft 8 in (2.03 m)	235 lb (107 kg)	1994-07-09	LSU
C	9	Kelly Olynyk	7 ft 0 in (2.13 m)	245 lb (111 kg)	1991-04-19	Gonzaga
SG	0	Josh Richardson	6 ft 6 in (1.98 m)	200 lb (91 kg)	1993-09-15	Tennessee
SG	3	Dwyane Wade	6 ft 4 in (1.93 m)	220 lb (100 kg)	1982-01-17	Marquette
SG	11	Dion Waiters	6 ft 4 in (1.93 m)	215 lb (98 kg)	1991-12-10	Syracuse
PG	14	Derrick Walton (TW)	6 ft 1 in (1.85 m)	185 lb (84 kg)	1995-04-03	Michigan
C	21	Hassan Whiteside	7 ft 0 in (2.13 m)	265 lb (120 kg)	1989-06-13	Marshall
SF	20	Justise Winslow	6 ft 7 in (2.01 m)	225 lb (102 kg)	1996-03-26	Duke

Coaches
Head coach
- Erik Spoelstra
Assistant(s)
- Dan Craig
- Juwan Howard
- Octavio De La Grana (Player Development)
- Chris Quinn (Player Development)

Legend
- (DP) Unsigned draft pick
- (FA) Free agent
- (S) Suspended
- (GL) On assignment to G League affiliate
- (TW) Two-way affiliate player
- Injured

Roster
Updated: 2018-03-24

== Standings ==
=== Division ===
Southeast Division	W	L	PCT	GB	Home	Road	Div	GP
y – Miami Heat	44	38	.537	–	26‍–‍15	18‍–‍23	11–5	82
x – Washington Wizards	43	39	.524	1.0	23‍–‍18	20‍–‍21	8–8	82
Charlotte Hornets	36	46	.439	8.0	21‍–‍20	15‍–‍26	11–5	82
Orlando Magic	25	57	.305	19.0	17‍–‍24	8‍–‍33	5–11	82
Atlanta Hawks	24	58	.293	20.0	16‍–‍25	8‍–‍33	5–11	82

=== Conference ===
Eastern Conference
#	Team	W	L	PCT	GB	GP
1	c – Toronto Raptors *	59	23	.720	–	82
2	x – Boston Celtics	55	27	.671	4.0	82
3	x – Philadelphia 76ers	52	30	.634	7.0	82
4	y – Cleveland Cavaliers *	50	32	.610	9.0	82
5	x – Indiana Pacers	48	34	.585	11.0	82
6	y – Miami Heat *	44	38	.537	15.0	82
7	x – Milwaukee Bucks	44	38	.537	15.0	82
8	x – Washington Wizards	43	39	.524	16.0	82
9	Detroit Pistons	39	43	.476	20.0	82
10	Charlotte Hornets	36	46	.439	23.0	82
11	New York Knicks	29	53	.354	30.0	82
12	Brooklyn Nets	28	54	.341	31.0	82
13	Chicago Bulls	27	55	.329	32.0	82
14	Orlando Magic	25	57	.305	34.0	82
15	Atlanta Hawks	24	58	.293	35.0	82

== Game log ==
=== Preseason ===
2017 pre-season game log
Total: 3–3 (home: 3–0; road: 0–3)
Pre-season: 3–3 (home: 3–0; road: 0–3)

Game	Date	Team	Score	High points	High rebounds	High assists	Location Attendance	Record
1	October 1	Atlanta	W 96–90	Tyler Johnson (14)	Hassan Whiteside (15)	Kelly Olynyk (5)	American Airlines Arena; 19,600	1–0
2	October 5	@ Brooklyn	L 88–107	Tyler Johnson (21)	Hassan Whiteside (9)	Josh Richardson (4)	Barclays Center; N/A	1–1
3	October 7	@ Orlando	L 90–93	Josh Richardson (19)	Hassan Whiteside (15)	Johnson, Olynyk, Richardson (4)	Amway Center; 18,428	1–2
4	October 9	Charlotte	W 109–106	Johnson, Richardson (18)	Kelly Olynyk (12)	Dion Waiters (8)	American Airlines Arena; 19,600	2–2
5	October 11	Washington	W 117–115	Bam Adebayo (15)	Olynyk, Winslow (7)	Justise Winslow (9)	American Airlines Arena; 19,600	3–2
6	October 13	@ Philadelphia	L 95–119	Adebayo, Johnson, Waiters (13)	Jordan Mickey (10)	Derrick Walton Jr. (6)	Sprint Center; 11,249	3–3

2017–18 season schedule

=== Regular season ===
2017–18 game log
Total: 44–38 (home: 26–15; road: 18–23)
October: 2–4 (home: 2–3; road: 0–1)

Game	Date	Team	Score	High points	High rebounds	High assists	Location Attendance	Record
1	October 18	@ Orlando	L 109–116	Hassan Whiteside (26)	Hassan Whiteside (22)	James Johnson (8)	Amway Center; 18,846	0–1
2	October 21	Indiana	W 112–108	Goran Dragic (23)	Kelly Olynyk (9)	James Johnson (8)	AmericanAirlines Arena; 19,600	1–1
3	October 23	Atlanta	W 104–93	Josh Richardson (21)	Kelly Olynyk (10)	Goran Dragic (6)	AmericanAirlines Arena; 19,600	2–1
4	October 25	San Antonio	L 100–117	Tyler Johnson (23)	James Johnson (9)	Dion Waiters (5)	AmericanAirlines Arena; 19,600	2–2
5	October 28	Boston	L 90–96	Goran Dragic (22)	Justise Winslow (12)	Goran Dragic (4)	American Airlines Arena; 19,600	2–3
6	October 30	Minnesota	L 122–125 (OT)	Dion Waiters (33)	Bam Adebayo (13)	Goran Dragic (5)	American Airlines Arena; 19,600	2–4

November : 8–7 (home: 2–2; road: 6–5)

Game	Date	Team	Score	High points	High rebounds	High assists	Location Attendance	Record
7	November 1	Chicago	W 97–91	Goran Dragic (20)	Hassan Whiteside (14)	Dion Waiters (7)	American Airlines Arena; 19,600	3–4
8	November 3	@ Denver	L 94–95	Goran Dragic (23)	James Johnson (10)	Goran Dragic (7)	Pepsi Center; 15,317	3–5
9	November 5	@ LA Clippers	W 104–101	Hassan Whiteside (21)	Hassan Whiteside (17)	Goran Dragic (6)	Staples Center; 15,676	4–5
10	November 6	@ Golden State	L 80–97	James Johnson (21)	James Johnson (9)	James Johnson (6)	Oracle Arena; 19,596	4–6
11	November 8	@ Phoenix	W 126–115	Goran Dragic (29)	Hassan Whiteside (10)	Johnson, Winslow (5)	Talking Stick Resort Arena; 16,500	5–6
12	November 10	@ Utah	W 84–74	Dion Waiters (21)	Hassan Whiteside (20)	Goran Dragic (3)	Vivint Smart Home Arena; 18,306	6–6
13	November 12	@ Detroit	L 103–112	Hassan Whiteside (20)	Hassan Whiteside (12)	Goran Dragic (7)	Little Caesars Arena; 16,236	6–7
14	November 15	Washington	L 93–104	Goran Dragic (21)	Hassan Whiteside (21)	Dion Waiters (5)	American Airlines Arena; 19,600	6–8
15	November 17	@ Washington	W 91–88	Hassan Whiteside (22)	Hassan Whiteside (16)	Goran Dragic (7)	Capital One Arena; 17,551	7–8
16	November 19	Indiana	L 95–120	Wayne Ellington (21)	Hassan Whiteside (8)	James Johnson (6)	American Airlines Arena; 19,600	7–9
17	November 22	Boston	W 104–98	Goran Dragic (27)	Hassan Whiteside (10)	Dion Waiters (6)	American Airlines Arena; 19,704	8–9
18	November 24	@ Minnesota	W 109–97	Wayne Ellington (21)	Hassan Whiteside (10)	James Johnson (8)	Target Center; 18,978	9–9
19	November 26	@ Chicago	W 100–93	Goran Dragic (24)	Hassan Whiteside (9)	James Johnson (6)	United Center; 20,928	10–9
20	November 28	@ Cleveland	L 97–108	Dion Waiters (21)	Tyler Johnson (20)	Dion Waiters (7)	Quicken Loans Arena; 20,562	10–10
21	November 29	@ NY Knicks	L 86–115	Kelly Olynyk (18)	Adebayo, Olynyk, Winslow (5)	Dion Waiters (8)	Madison Square Garden; 17,693	10–11

December : 9–6 (home: 4–4; road: 5–2)

Game	Date	Team	Score	High points	High rebounds	High assists	Location Attendance	Record
22	December 1	Charlotte	W 105–100	Josh Richardson (27)	Justise Winslow (11)	Kelly Olynyk (6)	American Airlines Arena; 19,600	11–11
23	December 3	Golden State	L 95–123	Goran Dragic (24)	Kelly Olynyk (7)	Kelly Olynyk (5)	American Airlines Arena; 19,600	11–12
24	December 6	@ San Antonio	L 105–117	Dion Waiters (22)	Kelly Olynyk (8)	Goran Dragic (6)	AT&T Center; 18,252	11–13
25	December 9	@ Brooklyn	W 101–89	Goran Dragic (20)	Dragic, Johnson (7)	Dragic, Johnson, Olynyk (3)	Mexico City Arena; 19,777	12–13
26	December 11	@ Memphis	W 107–82	Goran Dragic (19)	Dragic, Johnson, Richardson, Winslow (5)	Goran Dragic (5)	FedEx Forum; 14,857	13–13
27	December 13	Portland	L 95–102	Wayne Ellington (24)	James Johnson (10)	James Johnson (8)	AmericanAirlines Arena; 19,600	13–14
28	December 15	@ Charlotte	W 104–98	Ellington, Johnson (16)	Jordan Mickey (7)	Goran Dragic (7)	Spectrum Center; 15,565	14–14
29	December 16	LA Cilppers	W 90–85	Josh Richardson (28)	Johnson, Dion Waiters (6)	Kelly Olynyk (4)	AmericanAirlines Arena; 19,600	15–14
30	December 18	@ Atlanta	L 104–110	Josh Richardson (26)	Adebayo, Mickey (10)	Olynyk, Dion Waiters (5)	Philips Arena; 14,227	15–15
31	December 20	@ Boston	W 90–89	Kelly Olynyk (32)	Tyler Johnson (11)	Richardson, Dion Waiters (6)	TD Garden; 18,624	16–15
32	December 22	Dallas	W 113–101	Josh Richardson (24)	Bam Adebayo (8)	Adebayo, Richardson, Walton Jr. (5)	AmericanAirlines Arena; 19,600	17–15
33	December 23	New Orleans	L 94–109	Tyler Johnson (20)	Kelly Olynyk (8)	Matt Willams (4)	AmericanAirlines Arena; 19,600	17–16
34	December 26	Orlando	W 107–89	Josh Richardson (20)	Kelly Olynyk (12)	Goran Dragic (6)	AmericanAirlines Arena; 19,600	18–16
35	December 29	Brooklyn	L 87–111	Josh Richardson (19)	Jordan Mickey (9)	Goran Dragic (5)	AmericanAirlines Arena; 19,600	18–17
36	December 30	@ Orlando	W 117–111	Tyler Johnson (31)	Hassan Whiteside (13)	Goran Dragic (8)	Amway Center; 18,846	19–17

January : 10–5 (home: 5–1; road: 5–4)

Game	Date	Team	Score	High points	High rebounds	High assists	Location Attendance	Record
37	January 3	Detroit	W 111–104	Kelly Olynyk (25)	Kelly Olynyk (13)	Goran Dragic (13)	American Airlines Arena; 19,600	20–17
38	January 5	NY Knicks	W 107–103 (OT)	Wayne Ellington (24)	Kelly Olynyk (10)	Dragic, Johnson (6)	American Airlines Arena; 19,600	21–17
39	January 7	Utah	W 103–102	Dragic, Johnson (16)	Hassan Whiteside (10)	Josh Richardson (7)	American Airlines Arena; 19,600	22–17
40	January 9	@ Toronto	W 90–89	Goran Dragic (24)	Adebayo, Whiteside (15)	Dragic, Richardson (4)	Air Canada Centre; 19,800	23–17
41	January 10	@ Indiana	W 114–106	Goran Dragic (20)	Hassan Whiteside (15)	Goran Dragic (9)	Bankers Life Fieldhouse; 14,540	24–17
42	January 14	Milwaukee	W 97–79	Goran Dragic (25)	Hassan Whiteside (10)	James Johnson (8)	American Airlines Arena; 19,600	25–17
43	January 15	@ Chicago	L 111–119	Goran Dragic (22)	Hassan Whiteside (8)	Goran Dragic (9)	United Center; 20,546	25–18
44	January 17	@ Milwaukee	W 106–101	Hassan Whiteside (27)	Hassan Whiteside (13)	James Johnson (6)	BMO Harris Bradley Center; 16,695	26–18
45	January 19	@ Brooklyn	L 95–101	Hassan Whiteside (22)	Hassan Whiteside (13)	Josh Richardson (7)	Barclays Center; 17,732	26–19
46	January 20	@ Charlotte	W 106–105	Wayne Ellington (26)	Hassan Whiteside (14)	James Johnson (7)	Spectrum Center; 18,687	27–19
47	January 22	@ Houston	L 90–99	Hassan Whiteside (22)	Hassan Whiteside (13)	Johnson, Winslow (4)	Toyota Center; 18,055	27–20
48	January 25	Sacramento	L 88–89	Goran Dragic (23)	Hassan Whiteside (13)	Josh Richardson (5)	American Airlines Arena; 19,600	27–21
49	January 27	Charlotte	W 95–91	Josh Richardson (19)	Whiteside, Johnson (10)	Kelly Olynyk (6)	American Airlines Arena; 19,600	28–21
50	January 29	@ Dallas	W 95–88	Hassan Whiteside (25)	Hassan Whiteside (14)	James Johnson (6)	American Airlines Center; 19,555	29–21
51	January 31	@ Cleveland	L 89–91	Goran Dragic (18)	Justise Winslow (10)	Goran Dragic (6)	Quicken Loans Arena; 20,562	29–22

February : 3–7 (home: 3–2; road: 0–5)

Game	Date	Team	Score	High points	High rebounds	High assists	Location Attendance	Record
52	February 2	@ Philadelphia	L 97–103	Kelly Olynyk (19)	Bam Adebayo (13)	Bam Adebayo (6)	Wells Fargo Center; 20,636	29–23
53	February 3	@ Detroit	L 107–111	Goran Dragic (33)	Kelly Olynyk (8)	James Johnson (7)	Little Caesars Arena; 18,747	29–24
54	February 5	Orlando	L 109–111	Josh Richardson (20)	Hassan Whiteside (14)	Goran Dragic (7)	American Airlines Arena; 19,600	29–25
55	February 7	Houston	L 101–109	Dragic, Richardson (30)	Hassan Whiteside (17)	Goran Dragic (6)	American Airlines Arena; 19,600	29–26
56	February 9	Milwaukee	W 91–85	Tyler Johnson (19)	Hassan Whiteside (16)	Adebayo, Dragic, Johnson (3)	American Airlines Arena; 20,018	30–26
57	February 13	@ Toronto	L 112–115	Goran Dragic (28)	Hassan Whiteside (10)	Dwyane Wade (6)	Air Canada Centre; 19,800	30–27
58	February 14	@ Philadelphia	L 102–104	James Johnson (7)	Hassan Whiteside (10)	Tyler Johnson (6)	Wells Fargo Center; 20,492	30–28
59	February 23	@ New Orleans	L 123–124 (OT)	Goran Dragic (30)	Hassan Whiteside (16)	Goran Dragic (8)	Smoothie King Center; 17,751	30–29
60	February 24	Memphis	W 115–89	Tyler Johnson (23)	Hassan Whiteside (8)	Goran Dragic (8)	American Airlines Arena; 19,600	31–29
61	February 27	Philadelphia	W 102–101	Dwyane Wade (27)	Hassan Whiteside (11)	Goran Dragić (5)	American Airlines Arena; 19,600	32–29

March : 9–7 (home: 8–2; road: 1–5)

Game	Date	Team	Score	High points	High rebounds	High assists	Location Attendance	Record
62	March 1	LA Lakers	L 113–131	Dwyane Wade (25)	Hassan Whiteside (7)	Goran Dragić (7)	American Airlines Arena; 19,600	32–30
63	March 3	Detroit	W 105–96	Richardson, Olynyk (17)	Hassan Whiteside (19)	Goran Dragić (5)	American Airlines Arena; 19,600	33–30
64	March 5	Phoenix	W 125–103	Hassan Whiteside (24)	Hassan Whiteside (14)	Kelly Olynyk (8)	American Airlines Arena; 19,600	34–30
65	March 6	@ Washington	L 113–117 (OT)	Dwyane Wade (22)	Kelly Olynyk (9)	Dwyane Wade (6)	Capital One Arena; 16,582	34–31
66	March 8	Philadelphia	W 108–99	Hassan Whiteside (26)	Hassan Whiteside (8)	Goran Dragić (7)	American Airlines Arena; 19,600	35–31
67	March 10	Washington	W 129–102	James Johnson (20)	Kelly Olynyk (11)	James Johnson (5)	American Airlines Arena; 19,689	36–31
68	March 12	@ Portland	L 99–115	Goran Dragić (23)	Justise Winslow (13)	Kelly Olynyk (7)	Moda Center; 19,786	36–32
69	March 14	@ Sacramento	L 119–123 (OT)	Goran Dragić (33)	Bam Adebayo (16)	James Johnson (7)	Golden 1 Center; 17,583	36–33
70	March 16	@ LA Lakers	W 92–91	Goran Dragić (30)	Adebayo, Richardson (8)	James Johnson (4)	Staples Center; 18,997	37–33
71	March 19	Denver	W 149–141 (2OT)	James Johnson (31)	James Johnson (11)	Goran Dragić (8)	American Airlines Arena; 19,600	38–33
72	March 21	New York	W 119–98	Tyler Johnson (22)	Johnson, Olynyk (5)	Kelly Olynyk (10)	American Airlines Arena; 19,600	39–33
73	March 23	@ Oklahoma City	L 99–105	James Johnson (23)	Bam Adebayo (7)	Dragić, Richardson (5)	Chesapeake Energy Arena; 18,203	39–34
74	March 25	@ Indiana	L 107–113 (OT)	Tyler Johnson (19)	Johnson, Olynyk (9)	Dwyane Wade (7)	Bankers Life Fieldhouse; 17,923	39–35
75	March 27	Cleveland	W 98–79	Kelly Olynyk (19)	Justise Winslow (9)	Dragić, Johnson (5)	American Airlines Arena; 20,093	40–35
76	March 29	Chicago	W 103–92	Josh Richardson (22)	Justise Winslow (9)	Goran Dragić (5)	American Airlines Arena; 19,746	41–35
77	March 31	Brooklyn	L 109–110 (OT)	Dragić, Johnson (18)	Dragić, Olynyk (8)	James Johnson (5)	American Airlines Arena; 19,600	41–36

April : 3–2 (home: 2–1; road: 1–1)

Game	Date	Team	Score	High points	High rebounds	High assists	Location Attendance	Record
78	April 3	Atlanta	W 101–98	Goran Dragić (22)	Hassan Whiteside (12)	James Johnson (6)	American Airlines Arena; 19,600	42–36
79	April 4	@ Atlanta	W 115–86	Josh Richardson (19)	Hassan Whiteside (13)	Olynyk, Winslow (5)	Philips Arena; 16,696	43–36
80	April 6	@ NY Knicks	L 98–122	Goran Dragić (15)	Hassan Whiteside (6)	Johnson, McGruder (4)	Madison Square Garden; 19,569	43–37
81	April 9	Oklahoma City	L 93–115	Josh Richardson (18)	Justise Winslow (9)	Goran Dragić (7)	American Airlines Arena; 19,600	43–38
82	April 11	Toronto	W 116–109 (OT)	Wayne Ellington (32)	Hassan Whiteside (12)	Josh Richardson (5)	American Airlines Arena; 19,600	44–38

2017–18 season schedule

=== Playoffs ===
2018 playoff game log
Total: 1–4 (home: 0–2; road: 1–2)
First Round: 1–4 (home: 0–2; road: 1–2)

Game	Date	Team	Score	High points	High rebounds	High assists	Location Attendance	Series
1	April 14	@ Philadelphia	L 103–130	Kelly Olynyk (26)	Olynyk, Winslow (7)	Justise Winslow (5)	Wells Fargo Center; 20,617	0–1
2	April 16	@ Philadelphia	W 113–103	Dwyane Wade (28)	Johnson, Wade (7)	Kelly Olynyk (6)	Wells Fargo Center; 20,753	1–1
3	April 19	Philadelphia	L 108–128	Goran Dragic (23)	Justise Winslow (10)	Goran Dragic (8)	American Airlines Arena; 19,812	1–2
4	April 21	Philadelphia	L 102–106	Dwyane Wade (25)	Hassan Whiteside (13)	Josh Richardson (7)	American Airlines Arena; 19,804	1–3
5	April 24	@ Philadelphia	L 91–104	Kelly Olynyk (18)	Kelly Olynyk (8)	Kelly Olynyk (7)	Wells Fargo Center; 21,171	1–4

2018 playoff schedule

== Player statistics ==
=== Regular season ===
Player	POS	GP	GS	MP	REB	AST	STL	BLK	PTS	MPG	RPG	APG	SPG	BPG	PPG
Josh Richardson	SF	81	81	2,689	285	231	121	75	1,045	33.2	3.5	2.9	1.5	.9	12.9
Wayne Ellington	SG	77	2	2,041	218	79	53	8	864	26.5	2.8	1.0	.7	.1	11.2
Kelly Olynyk	PF	76	22	1,779	431	207	62	35	872	23.4	5.7	2.7	.8	.5	11.5
Goran Dragić	PG	75	75	2,378	306	359	63	12	1,296	31.7	4.1	4.8	.8	.2	17.3
James Johnson	PF	73	41	1,943	358	280	70	51	788	26.6	4.9	3.8	1.0	.7	10.8
Tyler Johnson	PG	72	39	2,052	248	165	60	34	843	28.5	3.4	2.3	.8	.5	11.7
Bam Adebayo	C	69	19	1,368	381	101	32	41	477	19.8	5.5	1.5	.5	.6	6.9
Justise Winslow	PF	68	25	1,680	370	148	54	33	529	24.7	5.4	2.2	.8	.5	7.8
Hassan Whiteside	C	54	54	1,364	618	54	37	94	754	25.3	11.4	1.0	.7	1.7	14.0
Dion Waiters	SG	30	30	918	77	113	23	9	429	30.6	2.6	3.8	.8	.3	14.3
Jordan Mickey	PF	23	3	284	81	9	6	10	93	12.3	3.5	.4	.3	.4	4.0
Dwyane Wade^{†}	SG	21	0	467	71	65	19	15	252	22.2	3.4	3.1	.9	.7	12.0
Rodney McGruder	SG	18	2	299	33	17	8	3	91	16.6	1.8	.9	.4	.2	5.1
Derrick Walton	PG	16	0	147	16	16	7	3	29	9.2	1.0	1.0	.4	.2	1.8
Derrick Jones Jr.^{†}	SF	14	8	212	34	6	3	9	52	15.1	2.4	.4	.2	.6	3.7
Udonis Haslem	C	14	0	72	10	5	0	2	8	5.1	.7	.4	.0	.1	.6
Luke Babbitt^{†}	SF	13	5	145	15	5	1	2	33	11.2	1.2	.4	.1	.2	2.5
Okaro White	PF	6	4	80	11	2	1	1	20	13.3	1.8	.3	.2	.2	3.3
Matt Williams	SG	3	0	11	1	0	0	0	5	3.7	.3	.0	.0	.0	1.7

- ^{†} Denotes player spent time with another team in the season. Stats reflect time with the Heat only.

=== Playoffs ===
Player	POS	GP	GS	MP	REB	AST	STL	BLK	PTS	MPG	RPG	APG	SPG	BPG	PPG
James Johnson	PF	5	5	161	30	24	6	6	62	32.2	6.0	4.8	1.2	1.2	12.4
Goran Dragić	PG	5	5	156	13	23	5	0	93	31.2	2.6	4.6	1.0	.0	18.6
Josh Richardson	SF	5	5	130	15	14	11	5	42	26.0	3.0	2.8	2.2	1.0	8.4
Tyler Johnson	PG	5	5	81	8	4	2	0	40	16.2	1.6	.8	.4	.0	8.0
Hassan Whiteside	C	5	5	77	30	1	0	6	26	15.4	6.0	.2	.0	1.2	5.2
Kelly Olynyk	PF	5	0	146	23	19	7	6	64	29.2	4.6	3.8	1.4	1.2	12.8
Dwyane Wade	SG	5	0	127	21	18	7	1	83	25.4	4.2	3.6	1.4	.2	16.6
Justise Winslow	PF	5	0	125	33	13	4	4	49	25.0	6.6	2.6	.8	.8	9.8
Wayne Ellington	SG	5	0	101	8	3	2	2	39	20.2	1.6	.6	.4	.4	7.8
Bam Adebayo	C	5	0	77	20	0	0	2	17	15.4	4.0	.0	.0	.4	3.4
Rodney McGruder	SG	4	0	16	4	0	0	0	2	4.0	1.0	.0	.0	.0	.5
Luke Babbitt	SF	2	0	3	0	0	0	0	0	1.5	.0	.0	.0	.0	.0

== Transactions ==
=== Trades ===
July 7, 2017	To Miami Heat A. J. Hammons; Two-way contract, free agent	To Dallas Mavericks Josh McRoberts; Future second-round draft pick Cash considerations

=== Free agents ===
==== Re-signed ====
Player	Date Signed	Contract	Ref.
Dion Waiters	July 7, 2017		
James Johnson	July 7, 2017		
Udonis Haslem	July 20, 2017		

==== Additions ====
Player	Signed	Contract	Former Team	Ref.
Kelly Olynyk	July 7, 2017		Boston Celtics	
Derrick Walton	July 24, 2017	Two-way contract	Michigan Wolverines	
Matt Williams	July 24, 2017	Two-way contract	Central Florida Knights	
Jordan Mickey	August 20, 2017		Boston Celtics	
Larry Drew II	September 5, 2017	Two-way contract	Philadelphia 76ers	

==== Subtractions ====
Player	Reason Left	New Team	Ref.
Chris Bosh	Life-threatening illness / Waived	—N/a (Retired)	
