= Josh Christopher =

American basketball player (born 2001)

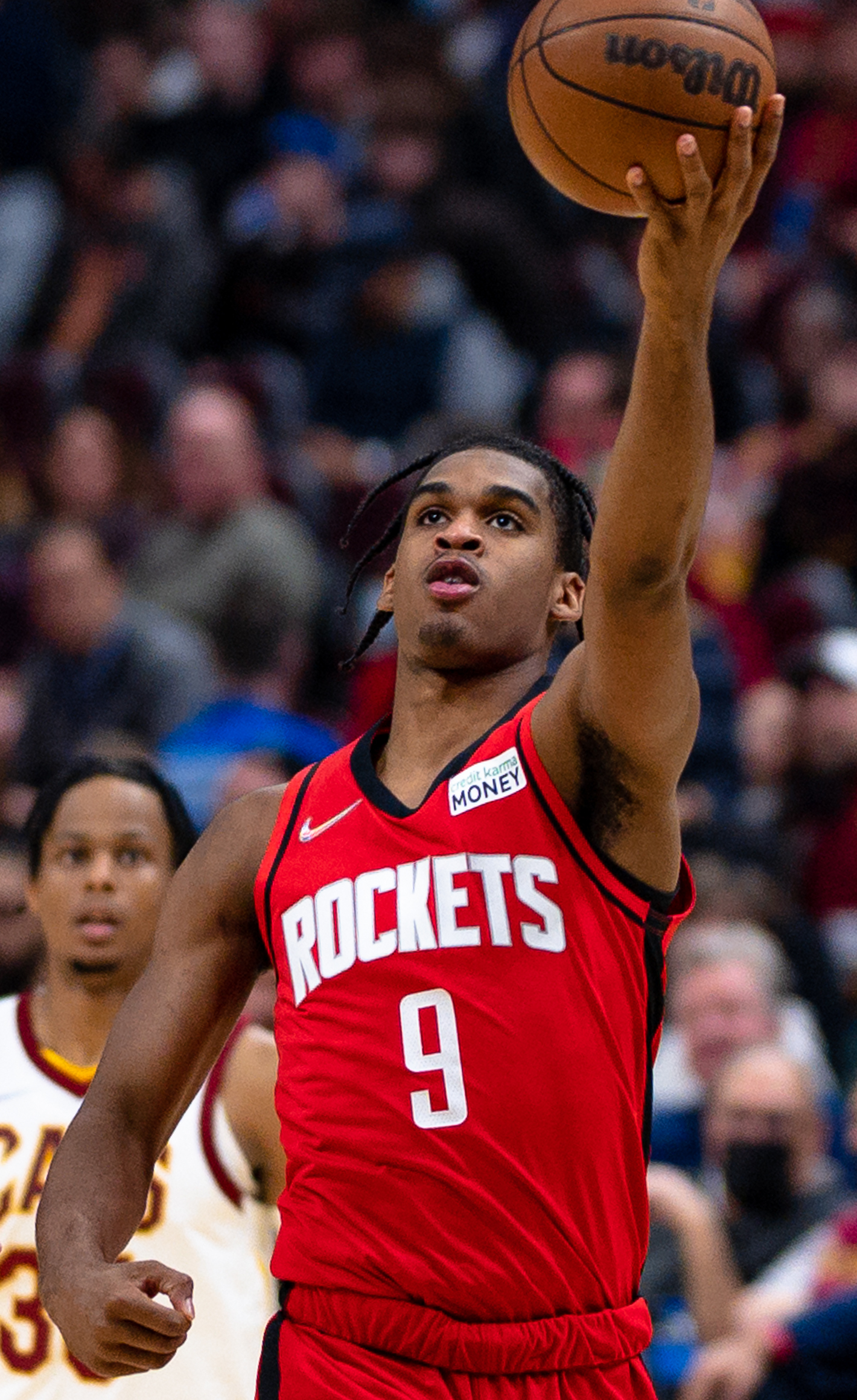
- Christopher with the Houston Rockets in 2021

No. 13 – Ironi Ness Ziona
- Position: Shooting guard
- League: Israeli Basketball Premier League

Personal information
- Born: December 8, 2001 (age 24) Carson, California, U.S.
- Listed height: 6 ft 4 in (1.93 m)
- Listed weight: 215 lb (98 kg)

Career information
- High school: Mayfair (Lakewood, California)
- College: Arizona State (2020–2021)
- NBA draft: 2021: 1st round, 24th overall pick
- Drafted by: Houston Rockets
- Playing career: 2021–present

Career history
- 2021–2023: Houston Rockets
- 2021–2022: →Rio Grande Valley Vipers
- 2023–2024: Salt Lake City Stars
- 2024–2025: Miami Heat
- 2024–2026: →Sioux Falls Skyforce
- 2026: Shenzhen Leopards
- 2026–present: Ironi Ness Ziona

Career highlights
- All-NBA G League Third Team (2025); NBA G League champion (2022); McDonald's All-American (2020)
- Stats at NBA.com
- Stats at Basketball Reference

Joshua Evan Christopher (born December 8, 2001) is an American professional basketball player for Ironi Ness Ziona of the Israeli Basketball Premier League.

A consensus five-star recruit and 2020 McDonald's All-American in high school, he played college basketball for the Arizona State Sun Devils. He is a 6-foot-4-inch (1.93 m), 215-pound (98 kg) shooting guard.

He was selected in the first round of the 2021 NBA draft (24th overall) by the Houston Rockets. After stints with the Rockets and the Miami Heat, Christopher played in the NBA G League, winning a title with the Rio Grande Valley Vipers in 2022, earning NBA Summer League Championship Game MVP honors in 2024, and receiving All-NBA G League Third Team recognition in 2025. Following a 2026 stint in the Chinese Basketball Association, he signed with Ironi Ness Ziona.

== Early life ==
Christopher, born in Carson, California, grew up in Lakewood, California, playing basketball with his older brother, Caleb, in elementary school, middle school, and his first two years with Mayfair High School in Lakewood, as well as on the Amateur Athletic Union (AAU) circuit. In his childhood, he often played against older opponents.

== High school ==
As a sophomore at Mayfair High School, Christopher averaged 25.9 points, 6.5 rebounds, 4.0 steals, and 3.6 assists per game, leading his team to a 21–8 record. In his junior season, he averaged 25 points per game and won the Division 2AA championship.

As a senior, Christopher was joined by Dior Johnson, one of the highest-rated sophomores in the country. He averaged 29.2 points, 8 rebounds, 3.9 assists, and 3.1 steals per game, leading his team to the CIF Southern Section Division 1 quarterfinals. Christopher was selected to play in the McDonald's All-American Game, Jordan Brand Classic and Nike Hoop Summit, but all three games were canceled due to the ongoing coronavirus pandemic.

Christopher was a consensus five-star recruit and the number two shooting guard in the 2020 recruiting class. On April 13, 2020, he announced his commitment to Arizona State over Michigan, USC, Missouri, and UCLA. His brother Caleb had played one year there as well. Christopher was Arizona State's highest-ranked recruit in the modern recruiting era and the program's first five-star recruit since James Harden in 2007.

College recruiting
Name	Hometown	School	Height	Weight	Commit date
Josh Christopher; SG	Carson, CA	Mayfair (CA)	6 ft 5 in (1.96 m)	215 lb (98 kg)	Apr 13, 2020
Josh Christopher; SG	Recruit ratings: Rivals: 247Sports: ESPN: (95)				
Overall recruit ranking: Rivals: 12 247Sports: 8 ESPN: 11
Note: In many cases, Scout, Rivals, 247Sports, On3, and ESPN may conflict in their listings of height and weight.; In these cases, the average was taken. ESPN grades are on a 100-point scale.; Sources: "Arizona State 2020 Basketball Commitments". Rivals.; "2020 Arizona State Sun Devils Recruiting Class". ESPN.; "2020 Team Ranking". Rivals.

== College career ==
On November 26, 2020, Christopher scored a career-high 28 points for Arizona State in an 83–74 loss to third-ranked Villanova. As a freshman, he was limited to 15 games due to injury, and averaged 29.8 minutes,14.3 points, 4.7 rebounds, 1.4 assists, and 1.5 steals per game, while shooting 80.0% from the free throw line. On March 31, 2021, Christopher declared for the 2021 NBA draft.

== Professional career ==
=== Houston Rockets (2021–2023) ===
Christopher was selected with the 24th pick of the 2021 NBA draft by the Houston Rockets. On August 7, 2021, Christopher signed with the Rockets. He made his official NBA debut on October 20, coming off the bench with five points in eight minutes in a loss against the Minnesota Timberwolves. On November 24, the Rockets assigned Christopher to the Rio Grande Valley Vipers. After averaging 22.0 points, 6.3 rebounds, and 5.7 assists in three games with the Vipers, he was recalled by the Rockets. On December 8, Christopher logged 18 points in a 7-of-7 from the field with four three-pointers in a 104–114 win over the Brooklyn Nets. On February 4, 2022, Christopher registered 23 points, four assists and five rebounds in a loss against the San Antonio Spurs. On March 23, he scored 21 points in a 139–130 overtime win against the Los Angeles Lakers. In April, he recorded his first 30-point effort by shooting 11-of-14 from the field, and 3-of-5 from beyond the arc, along with three assists and two steals in a home loss against the Timberwolves. In 2021-22 with the Houston Rockets, in 74 games he averaged 18.0 minutes, 7.9 points, 2.5 rebounds, 2.0 assists, and 0.9 steals per game.

Christopher fell out of the rotation in the 2022–2023 season, not coming off the bench in several games. His minutes and numbers decreased as the Rockets used Daishen Nix as the point guard for the second unit. In 2022-23 with the Vipers, in five games he averaged 25.2 points, 5.2 rebounds, 6.8 assists, and 1.2 steals per game, while shooting 56.0% from the floor . In 2022-23 with the Houston Rockets, in 64 games he averaged 12.3 minutes, 5.8 points,1.1 rebounds, and 1.1 assists per game, while shooting 46.5% from the floor.

On July 8, 2023, the Memphis Grizzlies acquired Christopher from the Houston Rockets for Dillon Brooks (via sign-and-trade) in a five-team deal. However, he was waived on September 30.

=== Salt Lake City Stars (2023–2024) ===
On October 13, 2023, Christopher signed a two-way contract with the Utah Jazz, but was waived on January 9, 2024, without playing for the team. However, he made 22 appearances with the Jazz's G League affiliate, the Salt Lake City Stars. In 2023-24 with the team, he averaged 29.1 minutes, 17.9 points, 4.8 rebounds, 6.0 assists, and 1.7 steals per game, while shooting 47.3% from the field and 81.6% from the free throw line.

=== Miami Heat / Sioux Falls Skyforce (2024–2026) ===
On January 14, 2024, Christopher joined the Sioux Falls Skyforce. In the latter part of the 2023-24 season, he played in 18 games in which he averaged 27.4 minutes, 15.8 points per game, 5.4 rebounds, 4.2 assists, and 2.2 steals per game.

On July 25, he signed a two-way contract with the Miami Heat. In 2024-25 with the Skyforce, in 36 games he averaged 35.9 minutes, 23.5 points, 6.9 rebounds, 4.5 assists, and 1.9 steals per game. In 2024-25 with the Heat, in 14 games he averaged 5.0 minutes, and 2.0 points per game, He was named 2025 All-NBA G League 3rd Team.

In 2025-26 with the Skyforce, in 35 games he averaged 33.4 minutes, 23.5 points, 5.4 rebounds, 4.2 assists, and 2.2 steals per game.In 2024-25 with the Heat, in 14 games he averaged 5.0 minutes, and 2.0 points per game, in which he shot 49.4% from the floor.

=== Shenzhen Aviators (2026) ===
On April 20, 2026, he signed with the Shenzhen Aviators in the Chinese Basketball Association. In eight games for the team, he averaged 16.8 minutes, 13.8 points, 4.8 rebounds, 2.2 assists, and 1.1 steals per game, while shooting 86.2% from the free throw line.

=== Ironi Nes Ziona (2026-present) ===
On September 8, 2026, he signed with Ironi Ness Ziona of the Israeli Basketball Premier League.

== Career statistics ==
Legend
GP	Games played	GS	Games started	MPG	Minutes per game
FG%	Field goal percentage	3P%	3-point field goal percentage	FT%	Free throw percentage
RPG	Rebounds per game	APG	Assists per game	SPG	Steals per game
BPG	Blocks per game	PPG	Points per game	**Bold**	Career high

=== NBA ===
Year	Team	GP	GS	MPG	FG%	3P%	FT%	RPG	APG	SPG	BPG	PPG
2021–22	Houston	**74**	**2**	18.0	.448	**.296**	.735	**2.5**	**2.0**	**.8**	**.2**	**7.9**
2022–23	Houston	64	**2**	12.3	**.465**	.236	**.750**	1.1	1.0	.5	**.2**	5.8
2024–25	Miami	14	0	4.9	.355	.183	.667	.6	.6	.4	**.2**	2.0
Career		152	4	14.4	.451	.273	.737	1.8	1.5	.7	.2	6.5

=== College ===
Year	Team	GP	GS	MPG	FG%	3P%	FT%	RPG	APG	SPG	BPG	PPG
2020–21	Arizona State	15	15	29.7	.432	.305	.800	4.7	1.4	1.5	.5	14.3

== Personal life ==
Christopher is the youngest of four siblings, all of whom have played basketball. His brother, Patrick Christopher, played professionally, including a brief stint with the Utah Jazz of the NBA. Patrick's godbrother is former NBA player Tayshaun Prince. Christopher's sister, Paris, played college basketball for Saint Mary's but suffered a career-ending injury as a freshman. His brother, Caleb, was a player for both Arizona State University and Tennessee Tech, ending his career at NAIA Hope International University.

Christopher's father, Laron, is a musician. His parents are devout Christians. Christopher is often known as "Jaygup," a nickname created in his childhood.
