= Bruno Fernando =

Angolan basketball player (born 1998)

- Fernando with Anadolu Efes in 2026

No. 20 – Anadolu Efes
- Position: Center
- League: BSL; EuroLeague

Personal information
- Born: August 15, 1998 (age 28) Luanda, Angola
- Listed height: 2.09 m (6 ft 10 in)
- Listed weight: 109 kg (240 lb)

Career information
- High school: Montverde Academy (Montverde, Florida); IMG Academy (Bradenton, Florida)
- College: Maryland (2017–2019)
- NBA draft: 2019: 2nd round, 34th overall pick
- Drafted by: Philadelphia 76ers
- Playing career: 2019–present

Career history
- 2019–2021: Atlanta Hawks
- 2019: →College Park Skyhawks
- 2021–2022: Boston Celtics
- 2021–2022: →Maine Celtics
- 2022–2023: Houston Rockets
- 2023–2024: Atlanta Hawks
- 2023: →College Park Skyhawks
- 2024–2025: Toronto Raptors
- 2025: Real Madrid
- 2025–2026: Partizan
- 2026–present: Anadolu Efes

Career highlights
- Liga ACB champion (2025); VTB United League Supercup winner (2026); First-team All-Big Ten (2019); Big Ten All-Defensive team (2019); Big Ten All-Freshman team (2018)
- Stats at NBA.com
- Stats at Basketball Reference
Medals
Men's basketball
Representing Angola
AfroBasket
Gold medal – first place	2025 Angola
FIBA Africa Under-18 Championship
Gold medal – first place	2016 Rwanda	Team

Bruno Afonso David Fernandes, also known as Bruno Fernando (born August 15, 1998), is an Angolan professional basketball player for Anadolu Efes of the Turkish Basketbol Süper Ligi (BSL) and the EuroLeague. He played college basketball for the Maryland Terrapins. Fernando is the first NBA player from Angola, and also plays for the Angola national team and won a gold medal at AfroBasket 2025.

== Early life ==
A native of Luanda, Angola, Bruno Fernando started playing basketball in his hometown. While playing the 2014 FIBA Under-17 World Championship with the Angolan national team, he caught the eye of scouts in the US. In early 2015, he joined the Montverde Academy in Montverde, Florida. He committed to Southern Methodist University in April 2016 but decided the following month to reclassify into the Class of 2017. He spent the 2016–17 season at IMG Academy in Bradenton, Florida. In October 2016, Bruno Fernando committed to the University of Maryland, after also considering Auburn, Alabama and Florida State, among others.

== College career ==
Fernando made his debut for Maryland on November 10, 2017, against Stony Brook. Coming off the bench, he scored ten points to go along with two rebounds, one assist, one block and one steal in 13 minutes of playing time. He was named Big Ten Freshman of the Week on January 8, 2018, after posting 17 points and 11 rebounds against Penn State and a career-high 21 points in a 91–73 win versus Iowa. He had a strong freshman season as he averaged 10.3 points, 6.5 rebounds and 1.2 blocks per game, and earned All-Big Ten Freshman honors. After the season, Fernando declared for the 2018 NBA draft and participated in the NBA Draft Combine that year, but withdrew from the draft and returned to Maryland.

== Professional career ==
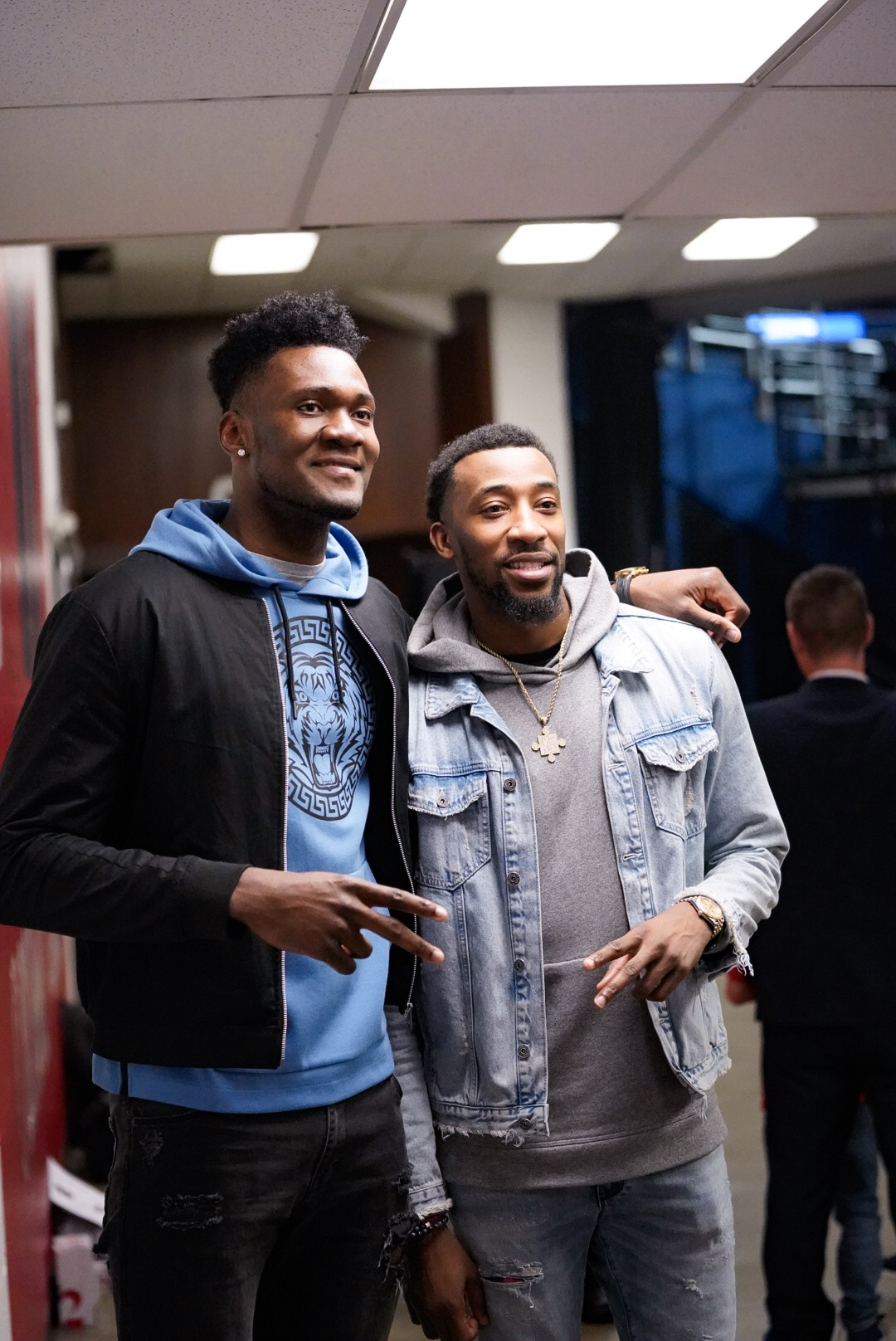
Fernando and Jordan McRae in 2019

=== Atlanta Hawks / College Park Skyhawks (2019–2021) ===
Fernando was selected as the 34th pick of the 2019 NBA draft by the Philadelphia 76ers. Fernando became the first Angolan player to be selected in the NBA draft. He was traded to the Atlanta Hawks. On July 7, 2019, the Hawks announced that they had signed Fernando. On October 24, 2019, Fernando made his debut in NBA, coming off from bench in a 117–100 win over the Detroit Pistons with seven points, three rebounds and two assists. He received his first assignment to the Hawks' NBA G League affiliate, the College Park Skyhawks, on November 25. He made his G League debut that evening. Fernando missed several games in January 2020 due to the death of his mother.

On June 20, 2021, Fernando was suspended for one game without pay for leaving the bench during an altercation between the Hawks and the Philadelphia 76ers.

=== Boston / Maine Celtics (2021–2022) ===
On August 7, 2021, Fernando was traded to the Boston Celtics in a three-team trade involving the Sacramento Kings. On November 19, 2021, Fernando made his debut with the Maine Celtics scoring four points and shooting 100% from the field.

=== Houston Rockets (2022–2023) ===
On February 10, 2022, the Houston Rockets acquired Fernando, Enes Freedom and Dennis Schröder from the Boston Celtics in exchange for Daniel Theis.

On July 26, 2022, Fernando re-signed with the Rockets in a two-way deal. On October 2, the Rockets converted his two-way contract into a four-year, $10.9 million deal. On October 19, he had his first start on the team with a seven-point, nine-rebound and seven-assist performance in a 117–107 loss to the Atlanta Hawks.

=== Return to Atlanta and College Park (2023–2024) ===
On February 9, 2023, Fernando and Garrison Mathews were traded to the Atlanta Hawks in exchange for Justin Holiday, Frank Kaminsky and two future second-round draft picks. On July 30, 2024, he was waived by the Hawks.

=== Toronto Raptors (2024–2025) ===
On August 4, 2024, Fernando signed with the Toronto Raptors. He made 17 appearances (two starts) for Toronto during the 2024–25 NBA season, averaging 3.4 points, 3.0 rebounds, and 1.1 assists. Fernando was waived by the Raptors on January 7, 2025.

=== Real Madrid (2025) ===
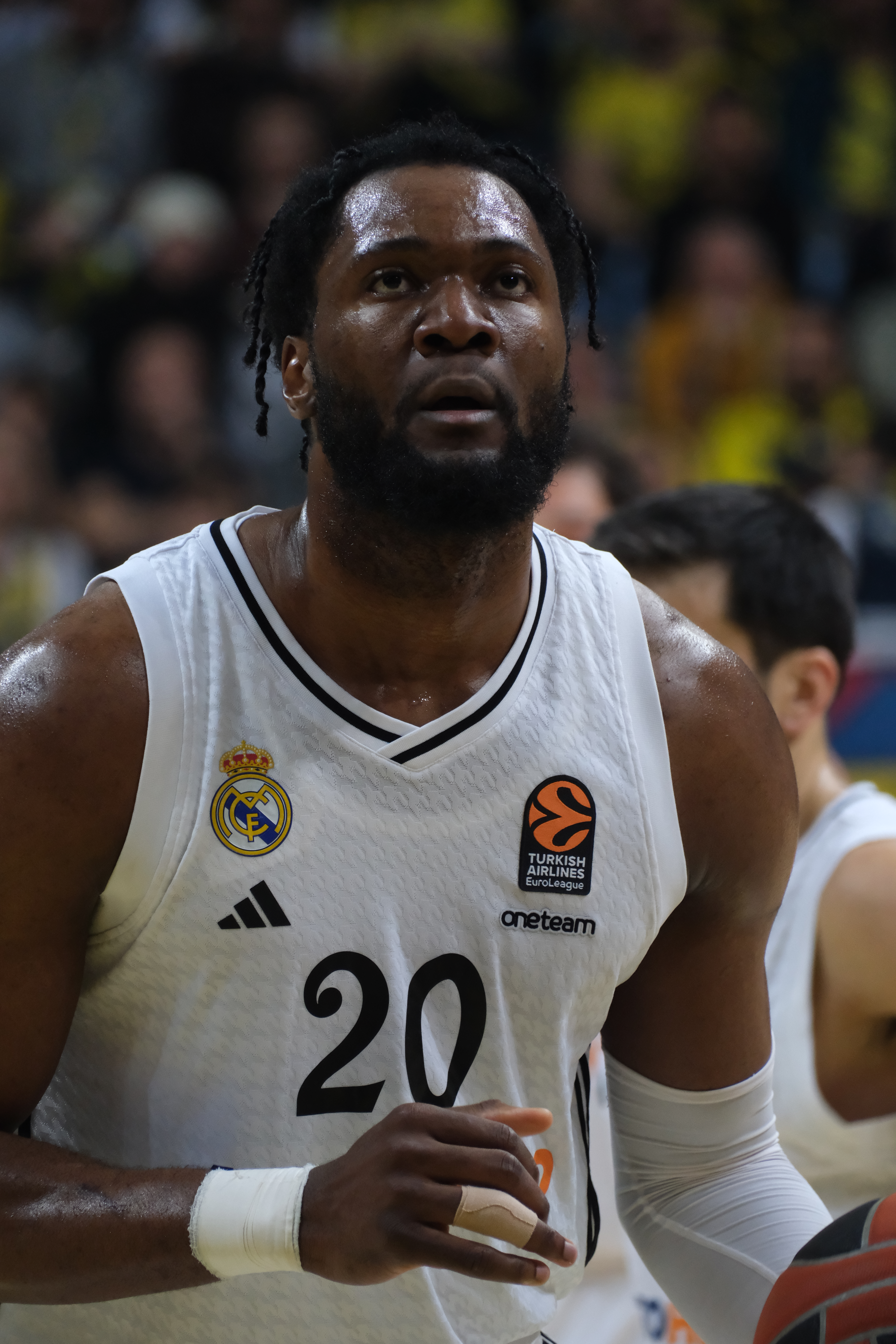
Fernando with Real Madrid in 2025

On January 24, 2025, Fernando signed with Real Madrid of the Spanish Liga ACB and the EuroLeague.

=== Partizan (2025–2026) ===
On October 26, 2025, Fernando signed with Partizan Mozzart Bet of the Serbian League (KLS), ABA League, and the EuroLeague.

=== Anadolu Efes (2026–present) ===
On July 10, 2026, Fernando signed with Anadolu Efes of the Turkish Basketbol Süper Ligi (BSL).

== National team career ==
Participating in the 2014 FIBA Under-17 World Championship in Dubai, he averaged 9.1 points, 10.6 rebounds and 2.7 blocks per contest for the Angolan national team. In 2016, Bruno Fernando made his debut with Angola's men's national team and participated in the FIBA Olympic Qualifying Tournament in Belgrade. Averaging 18.3 points, 6.6 boards, 2.1 assists and 1.6 blocks per game, he led Angola to gold at the 2016 FIBA Africa Under-18 Championship, while receiving Afrobasket.com All-African Championships U18 Best Player honors.

He later also joined the Angola senior team for the 2018 Olympic Qualifiers. He did not play for his country for four years, until returning in August 2022 for Angola's World Cup qualifiers.

Fernando played at FIBA AfroBasket 2025 and helped Angola win its record-extending twelfth gold medal, and was named to the All-Tournament Team in the process.

== Career statistics ==
Legend
GP	Games played	GS	Games started	MPG	Minutes per game
FG%	Field goal percentage	3P%	3-point field goal percentage	FT%	Free throw percentage
RPG	Rebounds per game	APG	Assists per game	SPG	Steals per game
BPG	Blocks per game	PPG	Points per game	**Bold**	Career high

=== NBA ===
==== Regular season ====
Year	Team	GP	GS	MPG	FG%	3P%	FT%	RPG	APG	SPG	BPG	PPG
2019–20	Atlanta	**56**	**13**	12.7	.518	.135	.569	3.5	.9	.3	.3	4.3
2020–21	Atlanta	33	0	6.8	.409	.000	.682	2.4	.3	.1	.1	1.5
2021–22	Boston	20	0	2.9	.500	**1.000**	.800	.8	.2	.0	.2	1.0
2021–22	Houston	10	0	9.4	**.707**	.000	.579	4.0	.3	.1	.8	**6.9**
2022–23	Houston	31	4	11.7	.516	.000	.682	3.9	1.0	.2	**1.0**	4.1
2022–23	Atlanta	8	0	5.2	.579	.000	**.833**	1.9	.1	.0	.4	3.4
2023–24	Atlanta	45	2	**15.2**	.583	.000	.667	**4.3**	1.0	**.6**	.6	6.3
2024–25	Toronto	17	2	8.6	.531	—	.750	3.0	**1.1**	.2	.5	3.4
Career		220	21	10.6	.543	.122	.653	3.2	.7	.3	.5	4.0

==== Playoffs ====
Year	Team	GP	GS	MPG	FG%	3P%	FT%	RPG	APG	SPG	BPG	PPG
2021	Atlanta	6	0	2.0	.667	—	1.000	.2	0.0	0.0	0.0	1.0
Career		6	0	2.0	.667	—	1.000	.2	0.0	0.0	0.0	1.0

=== College ===
Year	Team	GP	GS	MPG	FG%	3P%	FT%	RPG	APG	SPG	BPG	PPG
2017–18	Maryland	30	20	22.4	.578	**.333**	.740	6.6	.7	.4	1.2	10.3
2018–19	Maryland	**34**	**33**	**30.0**	**.607**	.300	**.779**	**10.6**	**2.0**	**.6**	**1.9**	**13.6**
Career		64	53	26.4	.595	.308	.763	8.7	1.4	.5	1.6	12.0
