= 2022–23 Houston Rockets season =

- Head coach: Stephen Silas
- President: Gretchen Sheirr
- General manager: Rafael Stone
- Owner: Tilman Fertitta
- Arena: Toyota Center

Results
- Record: 22–60 (.268)
- Place: Division: 4th (Southwest); Conference: 14th (Western)
- Playoff finish: Did not qualify
- Stats at Basketball Reference

Local media
- Television: AT&T SportsNet Southwest
- Radio: Sportstalk 790

The 2022–23 Houston Rockets season was the 56th season of the franchise in the National Basketball Association (NBA), and 52nd season in the city of Houston.

The team selected Jabari Smith Jr. at third overall. With their 96–118 loss to the Brooklyn Nets on March 7, 2023, the Houston Rockets were officially eliminated from playoff contention for the third consecutive season. They finished the season with a 22–60 record, a two-game improvement over the previous season.

== Draft ==
| Round | Pick | Player | Position | Nationality | College |
|---|---|---|---|---|---|
| 1 | 3 | Jabari Smith Jr. | Power forward | United States | Auburn |
| 1 | 17 | Tari Eason | Power forward | United States | LSU |

The Rockets entered the draft holding two first round picks. The 17th overall pick came from the Brooklyn Nets in the James Harden trade.

On draft night, Houston traded Wendell Moore's draft rights at 26th to the Minnesota Timberwolves in exchange for the draft rights to TyTy Washington at 29th, in addition to two future second-round picks—2025 and 2027.

== Roster ==
2022–23 Houston Rockets roster
Players

| Pos. | No. | Player | Height | Weight | DOB | From |
|---|---|---|---|---|---|---|
| G | 14 | D. J. Augustin | 5 ft 11 in (1.80 m) | 183 lb (83 kg) | 1987-11-10 | Texas |
| C | 2 | Willie Cauley-Stein | 7 ft 0 in (2.13 m) | 240 lb (109 kg) | 1993-08-18 | Kentucky |
| G | 9 | Josh Christopher | 6 ft 4 in (1.93 m) | 215 lb (98 kg) | 2001-12-08 | Arizona State |
| F | 5 | Darius Days (TW) | 6 ft 7 in (2.01 m) | 245 lb (111 kg) | 1999-10-20 | LSU |
| F | 17 | Tari Eason | 6 ft 8 in (2.03 m) | 215 lb (98 kg) | 2001-05-10 | LSU |
| F/C | 16 | Usman Garuba | 6 ft 8 in (2.03 m) | 229 lb (104 kg) | 2002-03-09 | Spain |
| G | 4 | Jalen Green | 6 ft 4 in (1.93 m) | 186 lb (84 kg) | 2002-02-09 | Prolific Prep (CA) |
| G | 12 | Trevor Hudgins (TW) | 6 ft 0 in (1.83 m) | 180 lb (82 kg) | 1999-03-23 | Northwest Missouri State |
| F/C | 33 | Frank Kaminsky | 7 ft 0 in (2.13 m) | 240 lb (109 kg) | 1993-04-04 | Wisconsin |
| C | 51 | Boban Marjanović | 7 ft 4 in (2.24 m) | 290 lb (132 kg) | 1988-08-15 | Serbia |
| F | 6 | Kenyon Jr. Martin | 6 ft 7 in (2.01 m) | 215 lb (98 kg) | 2001-01-06 | IMG Academy (FL) |
| G | 15 | Daishen Nix | 6 ft 4 in (1.93 m) | 226 lb (103 kg) | 2002-02-13 | Trinity International (NV) |
| G | 3 | Kevin Jr. Porter (injured) | 6 ft 4 in (1.93 m) | 203 lb (92 kg) | 2000-05-04 | USC |
| C | 28 | Alperen Şengün | 6 ft 11 in (2.11 m) | 243 lb (110 kg) | 2002-07-25 | Turkey |
| F | 1 | Jabari Jr. Smith | 6 ft 11 in (2.11 m) | 220 lb (100 kg) | 2003-05-13 | Auburn |
| F | 8 | Jae'Sean Tate (injured) | 6 ft 5 in (1.96 m) | 230 lb (104 kg) | 1995-10-28 | Ohio State |
| G | 0 | TyTy Jr. Washington | 6 ft 3 in (1.91 m) | 197 lb (89 kg) | 2001-11-15 | Kentucky |

Coaches
Head coach
- Stephen Silas
Assistant(s)
- Mahmoud Abdelfattah
- Michael Batiste
- Will Dunn
- Rick Higgins
- Lionel Hollins
- John Lucas
- Irving Roland

Legend
- (DP) Unsigned draft pick
- (FA) Free agent
- (S) Suspended
- (GL) On assignment to G League affiliate
- (TW) Two-way affiliate player
- Injured

Roster
Updated: April 10, 2023

== Standings ==
=== Division ===
| Southwest Division | W | L | PCT | GB | Home | Road | Div | GP |
|---|---|---|---|---|---|---|---|---|
| y – Memphis Grizzlies | 51 | 31 | .622 | – | 35‍–‍6 | 16‍–‍25 | 13–3 | 82 |
| pi – New Orleans Pelicans | 42 | 40 | .512 | 9.0 | 27‍–‍14 | 15‍–‍26 | 11–5 | 82 |
| Dallas Mavericks | 38 | 44 | .463 | 13.0 | 23‍–‍18 | 15‍–‍26 | 9–7 | 82 |
| Houston Rockets | 22 | 60 | .268 | 29.0 | 14‍–‍27 | 8‍–‍33 | 4–12 | 82 |
| San Antonio Spurs | 22 | 60 | .268 | 29.0 | 14‍–‍27 | 8‍–‍33 | 3–13 | 82 |

=== Conference ===
Western Conference
| # | Team | W | L | PCT | GB | GP |
|---|---|---|---|---|---|---|
| 1 | c – Denver Nuggets * | 53 | 29 | .646 | – | 82 |
| 2 | y – Memphis Grizzlies * | 51 | 31 | .622 | 2.0 | 82 |
| 3 | y – Sacramento Kings * | 48 | 34 | .585 | 5.0 | 82 |
| 4 | x – Phoenix Suns | 45 | 37 | .549 | 8.0 | 82 |
| 5 | x – Los Angeles Clippers | 44 | 38 | .537 | 9.0 | 82 |
| 6 | x – Golden State Warriors | 44 | 38 | .537 | 9.0 | 82 |
| 7 | x – Los Angeles Lakers | 43 | 39 | .524 | 10.0 | 82 |
| 8 | x – Minnesota Timberwolves | 42 | 40 | .512 | 11.0 | 82 |
| 9 | pi – New Orleans Pelicans | 42 | 40 | .512 | 11.0 | 82 |
| 10 | pi – Oklahoma City Thunder | 40 | 42 | .488 | 13.0 | 82 |
| 11 | Dallas Mavericks | 38 | 44 | .463 | 15.0 | 82 |
| 12 | Utah Jazz | 37 | 45 | .451 | 16.0 | 82 |
| 13 | Portland Trail Blazers | 33 | 49 | .402 | 20.0 | 82 |
| 14 | Houston Rockets | 22 | 60 | .268 | 31.0 | 82 |
| 15 | San Antonio Spurs | 22 | 60 | .268 | 31.0 | 82 |

== Game log ==
=== Preseason ===
2022 preseason game log
Total: 3–1 (Home: 2–0; Road: 1–1)
Preseason: 3–1 (home: 2–0; road: 1–1)

| Game | Date | Team | Score | High points | High rebounds | High assists | Location Attendance | Record |
|---|---|---|---|---|---|---|---|---|
| 1 | October 2 | San Antonio | W 134–96 | Smith Jr., Eason (21) | Tari Eason (10) | Kevin Porter Jr. (6) | Toyota Center; 10,640 | 1–0 |
| 2 | October 7 | Toronto | W 116–100 | Tari Eason (24) | Bruno Fernando (10) | Martin Jr., Nix, Christopher (3) | Toyota Center; 10,902 | 2–0 |
| 3 | October 10 | @ Miami | L 110–118 | Jalen Green (25) | Tari Eason (12) | Kevin Porter Jr. (6) | FTX Arena; 19,600 | 2–1 |
| 4 | October 14 | @ Indiana | W 122–114 | Jalen Green (33) | Usman Garuba (9) | Alperen Şengün (5) | Gainbridge Fieldhouse; 7,107 | 3–1 |

2022–23 preseason schedule

=== Regular season ===
2022–23 game log
Total: 22–60 (Home: 14–27; Road: 8–33)
October: 1–7 (home: 1–1; road: 0–6)

| Game | Date | Team | Score | High points | High rebounds | High assists | Location Attendance | Record |
|---|---|---|---|---|---|---|---|---|
| 1 | October 19 | @ Atlanta | L 107–117 | Kevin Porter Jr. (21) | Fernando, Şengün (9) | Fernando, Porter Jr. (7) | State Farm Arena; 17,878 | 0–1 |
| 2 | October 21 | Memphis | L 122–129 | Jalen Green (33) | Alperen Şengün (12) | Gordon, Porter Jr. (4) | Toyota Center; 17,878 | 0–2 |
| 3 | October 22 | @ Milwaukee | L 105–125 | Jalen Green (22) | Jabari Smith Jr. (11) | Kevin Porter Jr. (7) | Fiserv Forum; 17,341 | 0–3 |
| 4 | October 24 | Utah | W 114–108 | Kevin Porter Jr. (26) | Kevin Porter Jr. (10) | Kevin Porter Jr. (4) | Toyota Center; 16,260 | 1–3 |
| 5 | October 26 | @ Utah | L 101–109 | Kevin Porter Jr. (24) | Kenyon Martin Jr. (10) | Kevin Porter Jr. (5) | Vivint Arena; 18,206 | 1–4 |
| 6 | October 28 | @ Portland | L 111–125 | Eric Gordon (18) | Alperen Şengün (11) | Jae'Sean Tate (6) | Moda Center; 19,082 | 1–5 |
| 7 | October 30 | @ Phoenix | L 109–124 | Kevin Porter Jr. (26) | Alperen Şengün (9) | Kevin Porter Jr. (6) | Footprint Center; 17,071 | 1–6 |
| 8 | October 31 | @ L.A. Clippers | L 93–95 | Kenyon Martin Jr. (23) | Alperen Şengün (9) | Kevin Porter Jr. (5) | Crypto.com Arena; 14,887 | 1–7 |

November : 4–9 (home: 2–4; road: 2–5)

| Game | Date | Team | Score | High points | High rebounds | High assists | Location Attendance | Record |
|---|---|---|---|---|---|---|---|---|
| 9 | November 2 | L.A. Clippers | L 101–109 | Alperen Şengün (26) | Alperen Şengün (13) | Kevin Porter Jr. (7) | Toyota Center; 15,860 | 1–8 |
| 10 | November 5 | @ Minnesota | L 117–129 | Jalen Green (21) | Alperen Şengün (7) | Daishen Nix (6) | Target Center; 16,412 | 1–9 |
| 11 | November 7 | @ Orlando | W 134–127 | Jalen Green (34) | Alperen Şengün (10) | Kevin Porter Jr. (11) | Amway Center; 15,441 | 2–9 |
| 12 | November 9 | @ Toronto | L 109–116 | Jalen Green (21) | Jabari Smith Jr. (10) | Kevin Porter Jr. (11) | Scotiabank Arena; 19,800 | 2–10 |
| 13 | November 12 | @ New Orleans | L 106–119 | Jalen Green (33) | Jabari Smith Jr. (15) | Jalen Green (6) | Smoothie King Center; 15,367 | 2–11 |
| 14 | November 14 | L.A. Clippers | L 106–122 | Jalen Green (25) | Kevin Porter Jr. (7) | Jalen Green (7) | Toyota Center; 16,098 | 2–12 |
| 15 | November 16 | @ Dallas | W 101–92 | Green, Porter Jr. (17) | Kevin Porter Jr. (11) | Kevin Porter Jr. (8) | American Airlines Center; 19,602 | 3–12 |
| 16 | November 18 | Indiana | L 91–99 | Eric Gordon (24) | Alperen Şengün (9) | Jalen Green (5) | Toyota Center; 15,882 | 3–13 |
| 17 | November 20 | Golden State | L 120–127 | Kevin Porter Jr. (30) | Tari Eason (8) | Kevin Porter Jr. (6) | Toyota Center; 18,055 | 3–14 |
| 18 | November 25 | Atlanta | W 128–122 | Jalen Green (30) | Kenyon Martin Jr. (15) | Kevin Porter Jr. (10) | Toyota Center; 16,669 | 4–14 |
| 19 | November 26 | Oklahoma City | W 118–105 | Jalen Green (28) | Alperen Şengün (19) | Jalen Green (9) | Toyota Center; 15,151 | 5–14 |
| 20 | November 28 | @ Denver | L 113–129 | Alperen Şengün (18) | Alperen Şengün (7) | Jalen Green (7) | Ball Arena; 16,027 | 5–15 |
| 21 | November 30 | @ Denver | L 100–120 | Kevin Porter Jr. (23) | Alperen Şengün (11) | Kevin Porter Jr. (5) | Ball Arena; 16,286 | 5–16 |

December: 5–10 (home: 3–6; road: 2–4)

| Game | Date | Team | Score | High points | High rebounds | High assists | Location Attendance | Record |
|---|---|---|---|---|---|---|---|---|
| 22 | December 2 | @ Phoenix | W 122–121 | Jalen Green (30) | Bruno Fernando (7) | Kevin Porter Jr. (7) | Footprint Center; 17,071 | 6–16 |
| 23 | December 3 | @ Golden State | L 101–120 | Kevin Porter Jr. (20) | Eason, Garuba (10) | Nix, Porter Jr. (4) | Chase Center; 18,064 | 6–17 |
| 24 | December 5 | Philadelphia | W 132–123 (2OT) | Jalen Green (27) | Jabari Smith Jr. (11) | Jalen Green (7) | Toyota Center; 15,331 | 7–17 |
| 25 | December 8 | @ San Antonio | L 109–118 | Jabari Smith Jr. (23) | Alperen Şengün (11) | Daishen Nix (5) | AT&T Center; 13,140 | 7–18 |
| 26 | December 11 | Milwaukee | W 97–92 | Jalen Green (30) | Jabari Smith Jr. (10) | Kevin Porter Jr. (7) | Toyota Center; 16,268 | 8–18 |
| 27 | December 13 | Phoenix | W 111–97 | Jalen Green (26) | Alperen Şengün (16) | Green, Porter Jr. (4) | Toyota Center; 15,128 | 9–18 |
| 28 | December 15 | Miami | L 108–111 | Jalen Green (22) | Jabari Smith Jr. (11) | Porter Jr., Washington Jr. (5) | Toyota Center; 16,210 | 9–19 |
| 29 | December 17 | Portland | L 95–107 | Jalen Green (15) | Alperen Şengün (8) | Green, Porter Jr. (4) | Toyota Center; 16,217 | 9–20 |
| 30 | December 19 | San Antonio | L 105–124 | Alperen Şengün (22) | Jabari Smith Jr. (8) | Daishen Nix (9) | Toyota Center; 15,928 | 9–21 |
| 31 | December 21 | Orlando | L 110–116 | Kevin Porter Jr. (31) | Alperen Şengün (12) | Alperen Şengün (6) | Toyota Center; 15,965 | 9–22 |
| 32 | December 23 | Dallas | L 106–112 | Jabari Smith Jr. (24) | Jabari Smith Jr. (10) | Alperen Şengün (7) | Toyota Center; 16,989 | 9–23 |
| 33 | December 26 | @ Chicago | W 133–118 | Kevin Porter Jr. (36) | Alperen Şengün (11) | Kevin Porter Jr. (9) | United Center; 21,561 | 10–23 |
| 34 | December 27 | @ Boston | L 102–126 | Jalen Green (28) | Şengün, Smith Jr. (9) | Kevin Porter Jr. (9) | TD Garden; 19,156 | 10–24 |
| 35 | December 29 | @ Dallas | L 114–129 | Jalen Green (23) | Usman Garuba (9) | Kevin Porter Jr. (7) | American Airlines Center; 20,307 | 10–25 |
| 36 | December 31 | New York | L 88–108 | Kevin Porter Jr. (23) | Tari Eason (13) | Kevin Porter Jr. (8) | Toyota Center; 18,055 | 10–26 |

January: 2–12 (home: 1–6; road: 1–6)

| Game | Date | Team | Score | High points | High rebounds | High assists | Location Attendance | Record |
|---|---|---|---|---|---|---|---|---|
| 37 | January 2 | Dallas | L 106–111 | Kevin Porter Jr. (25) | Tari Eason (7) | Kevin Porter Jr. (6) | Toyota Center; 18,055 | 10–27 |
| 38 | January 4 | @ New Orleans | L 108–119 | Green, Martin Jr. (16) | Jabari Smith Jr. (13) | Porter Jr, Şengün (5) | Smoothie King Center; 17,295 | 10–28 |
| 39 | January 5 | Utah | L 114–131 | Jalen Green (30) | Alperen Şengün (14) | Jalen Green (4) | Toyota Center; 16,320 | 10–29 |
| 40 | January 8 | Minnesota | L 96–104 | Kevin Porter Jr. (25) | Alperen Şengün (8) | Green, Porter Jr. (5) | Toyota Center; 18,055 | 10–30 |
| 41 | January 11 | @ Sacramento | L 115–135 | Jalen Green (26) | Alperen Şengün (10) | Alperen Şengün (10) | Golden 1 Center; 16,057 | 10–31 |
| 42 | January 13 | @ Sacramento | L 114–139 | Green, Smith Jr. (27) | Jabari Smith Jr. (8) | Alperen Şengün (7) | Golden 1 Center; 17,894 | 10–32 |
| 43 | January 15 | @ L.A. Clippers | L 100–121 | Eric Gordon (24) | Kenyon Martin Jr. (9) | Alperen Şengün (6) | Crypto.com Arena; 17,238 | 10–33 |
| 44 | January 16 | @ L.A. Lakers | L 132–140 | Alperen Şengün (33) | Alperen Şengün (15) | Eric Gordon (8) | Crypto.com Arena; 17,657 | 10–34 |
| 45 | January 18 | Charlotte | L 117–122 | Jalen Green (41) | Alperen Şengün (12) | Jalen Green (7) | Toyota Center; 15,678 | 10–35 |
| 46 | January 21 | @ Minnesota | L 104–113 | Alperen Şengün (19) | Alperen Şengün (16) | Alperen Şengün (7) | Target Center; 17,136 | 10–36 |
| 47 | January 23 | Minnesota | W 119–114 | Jalen Green (42) | Tari Eason (9) | Alperen Şengün (7) | Toyota Center; 13,811 | 11–36 |
| 48 | January 25 | Washington | L 103–108 | Alperen Şengün (21) | Kenyon Martin Jr. (13) | Alperen Şengün (10) | Toyota Center; 15,302 | 11–37 |
| 49 | January 26 | Cleveland | L 95–113 | Tari Eason (18) | Tari Eason (11) | Alperen Şengün (7) | Toyota Center; 16,327 | 11–38 |
| 50 | January 28 | @ Detroit | W 117–114 | Eric Gordon (24) | Kenyon Martin Jr. (13) | Eric Gordon (7) | Little Caesars Arena; 19,411 | 12–38 |

February: 1–10 (home: 1–4; road: 0–6)

| Game | Date | Team | Score | High points | High rebounds | High assists | Location Attendance | Record |
|---|---|---|---|---|---|---|---|---|
| 51 | February 1 | Oklahoma City | W 112–106 | Eric Gordon (25) | Tari Eason (13) | Martin Jr., Şengün (4) | Toyota Center; 15,181 | 13–38 |
| 52 | February 3 | Toronto | L 111–117 | Eric Gordon (28) | Jabari Smith Jr. (8) | Gordon, Nix (5) | Toyota Center; 16,585 | 13–39 |
| 53 | February 4 | @ Oklahoma City | L 121–153 | Christopher, Washington Jr. (20) | Tari Eason (8) | Christoper, Nix (5) | Paycom Center; 16,994 | 13–40 |
| 54 | February 6 | Sacramento | L 120–140 | Jalen Green (27) | Kenyon Martin Jr. (8) | Eric Gordon (8) | Toyota Center; 15,405 | 13–41 |
| 55 | February 8 | Sacramento | L 128–130 | Jalen Green (41) | Bruno Fernando (10) | Alperen Şengün (11) | Toyota Center; 15,881 | 13–42 |
| 56 | February 10 | @ Miami | L 95–97 | Jabari Smith Jr. (22) | Şengün, Smith Jr. (8) | TyTy Washington Jr. (6) | Miami-Dade Arena | 13–43 |
| 57 | February 13 | @ Philadelphia | L 104–123 | Jalen Green (29) | Jabari Smith Jr. (12) | Jalen Green (4) | Wells Fargo Center; 19,850 | 13–44 |
| 58 | February 15 | @ Oklahoma City | L 96–133 | Jabari Smith Jr. (15) | Alperen Şengün (10) | Frank Kaminsky (5) | Paycom Center; 14,988 | 13–45 |
| 59 | February 24 | @ Golden State | L 101–116 | Kenyon Martin Jr. (22) | Şengün, Smith Jr. (9) | Alperen Şengün (8) | Chase Center; 18,064 | 13–46 |
| 60 | February 26 | @ Portland | L 114–131 | Şengün, Tate (17) | Eason, Şengün (10) | Alperen Şengün (5) | Moda Center; 18,064 | 13–47 |
| 61 | February 28 | Denver | L 112–133 | Eason, Green (17) | Tari Eason (12) | Alperen Şengün (8) | Toyota Center; 15,368 | 13–48 |

March : 6–11 (home: 5–5; road: 1–6)

| Game | Date | Team | Score | High points | High rebounds | High assists | Location Attendance | Record |
|---|---|---|---|---|---|---|---|---|
| 62 | March 1 | Memphis | L 99–113 | Jalen Green (20) | Alperen Şengün (8) | Alperen Şengün (5) | Toyota Center; 15,919 | 13–49 |
| 63 | March 4 | @ San Antonio | W 122–110 | Tari Eason (20) | Kenyon Martin Jr. (13) | Kevin Porter Jr. (5) | AT&T Center; 18,354 | 14–49 |
| 64 | March 5 | San Antonio | W 142–110 | Jalen Green (31) | Alperen Şengün (14) | Kevin Porter Jr. (13) | Toyota Center; 16,721 | 15–49 |
| 65 | March 7 | Brooklyn | L 96–118 | Jalen Green (25) | Alperen Şengün (12) | Kevin Porter Jr. (7) | Toyota Center; 14,833 | 15–50 |
| 66 | March 9 | @ Indiana | L 125–134 (OT) | Jabari Smith Jr. (30) | Jabari Smith Jr. (12) | Jalen Green (4) | Gainbridge Fieldhouse; 16,027 | 15–51 |
| 67 | March 11 | Chicago | L 111–119 | Jabari Smith Jr. (20) | Jabari Smith Jr. (10) | Jalen Green (7) | Toyota Center; 18,055 | 15–52 |
| 68 | March 13 | Boston | W 111–109 | Jalen Green (28) | Jabari Smith Jr. (11) | Kevin Porter Jr. (13) | Toyota Center; 18,055 | 16–52 |
| 69 | March 15 | L.A. Lakers | W 114–110 | Kevin Porter Jr. (27) | Porter Jr., Şengün (9) | Porter Jr., Şengün (6) | Toyota Center; 18,055 | 17–52 |
| 70 | March 17 | New Orleans | W 114–112 | Jalen Green (25) | Alperen Şengün (11) | Green, Porter Jr. (6) | Toyota Center; 15,841 | 18–52 |
| 71 | March 19 | New Orleans | L 107–117 | Jalen Green (40) | Alperen Şengün (7) | Alperen Şengün (6) | Toyota Center; 14,209 | 18–53 |
| 72 | March 20 | Golden State | L 108–121 | Tari Eason (21) | Tari Eason (12) | Kevin Porter Jr. (5) | Toyota Center; 16,116 | 18–54 |
| 73 | March 22 | @ Memphis | L 125–130 | Jalen Green (32) | Kevin Porter Jr. (10) | Kevin Porter Jr. (10) | FedExForum; 17,794 | 18–55 |
| 74 | March 24 | @ Memphis | L 114–151 | Tari Eason (21) | Jabari Smith Jr. (8) | Kevin Porter Jr. (7) | FedExForum; 17,851 | 18–56 |
| 75 | March 26 | @ Cleveland | L 91–108 | Jalen Green (30) | Eason, Şengün (8) | Green, Porter Jr., Şengün (4) | Rocket Mortgage FieldHouse; 19,432 | 18–57 |
| 76 | March 27 | @ New York | L 115–137 | Kevin Porter Jr. (26) | Jabari Smith Jr. (11) | Jabari Smith Jr. (6) | Madison Square Garden; 19,812 | 18–58 |
| 77 | March 29 | @ Brooklyn | L 114–123 | Kevin Porter Jr. (31) | Sengün, Smith Jr. (12) | Kevin Porter Jr. (6) | Barclays Center; 17,074 | 18–59 |
| 78 | March 31 | Detroit | W 121–115 | Kevin Porter Jr. (33) | Alperen Şengün (13) | Alperen Şengün (7) | Toyota Center; 15,844 | 19–59 |

April : 3–1 (home: 1–1; road: 2–0)

| Game | Date | Team | Score | High points | High rebounds | High assists | Location Attendance | Record |
|---|---|---|---|---|---|---|---|---|
| 79 | April 2 | L.A. Lakers | L 109–134 | Jalen Green (24) | Alperen Şengün (15) | Jalen Green (7) | Toyota Center; 18,204 | 19–60 |
| 80 | April 4 | Denver | W 124–103 | Jalen Green (32) | Jabari Smith Jr. (13) | Kevin Porter Jr. (9) | Toyota Center; 16,924 | 20–60 |
| 81 | April 7 | @ Charlotte | W 112–109 | Green, Porter Jr. (26) | Alperen Şengün (21) | Jalen Green (6) | Spectrum Center; 19,102 | 21–60 |
| 82 | April 9 | @ Washington | W 114–109 | Jabari Smith Jr. (20) | Alperen Şengün (12) | Alperen Şengün (6) | Capital One Arena; 15,233 | 22–60 |

2022–23 season schedule

== Player statistics ==
| Player | Pos. | GP | GS | MP | Reb. | Ast. | Stl. | Blk. | Pts. |
|---|---|---|---|---|---|---|---|---|---|
| Josh Christopher | SG | 64 | 2 | 786 | 71 | 73 | 33 | 15 | 372 |
| Darius Days | PF | 4 | 0 | 25 | 6 | 1 | 0 | 1 | 15 |
| Tari Eason | PF | 82 | 5 | 1,767 | 496 | 88 | 96 | 47 | 760 |
| Bruno Fernando^{†} | C | 31 | 4 | 364 | 122 | 30 | 6 | 31 | 126 |
| Usman Garuba | PF | 75 | 1 | 970 | 307 | 64 | 44 | 29 | 225 |
| Eric Gordon^{†} | SG | 47 | 47 | 1,418 | 97 | 136 | 30 | 17 | 615 |
| Jalen Green | SG | 76 | 76 | 2,602 | 284 | 281 | 59 | 18 | 1,683 |
| Trevor Hudgins | PG | 5 | 0 | 28 | 0 | 3 | 0 | 0 | 9 |
| Frank Kaminsky^{≠} | C | 10 | 0 | 59 | 16 | 11 | 1 | 3 | 18 |
| Boban Marjanović | C | 31 | 0 | 171 | 60 | 9 | 5 | 2 | 102 |
| Kenyon Martin Jr. | SF | 82 | 49 | 2,292 | 452 | 123 | 41 | 30 | 1,039 |
| Garrison Mathews^{†} | SG | 45 | 0 | 602 | 62 | 23 | 23 | 4 | 214 |
| Daishen Nix | PG | 57 | 7 | 914 | 98 | 132 | 31 | 7 | 226 |
| Kevin Porter Jr. | PG | 59 | 59 | 2,024 | 314 | 338 | 82 | 17 | 1,130 |
| Alperen Şengün | C | 75 | 72 | 2,171 | 678 | 291 | 70 | 70 | 1,109 |
| Jabari Smith Jr. | PF | 79 | 79 | 2,451 | 569 | 101 | 43 | 74 | 1,010 |
| Jae'Sean Tate | SF | 31 | 7 | 677 | 118 | 84 | 21 | 7 | 283 |
| TyTy Washington | PG | 31 | 2 | 433 | 45 | 47 | 15 | 2 | 145 |

After all games.
^{‡}Waived during the season
^{†}Traded during the season
^{≠}Acquired during the season

== Transactions ==
=== Overview ===
Players Added

Via draft
- Jabari Smith Jr.
- Tari Eason
- TyTy Washington

Via trade

- Boban Marjanović
- Derrick Favors

Via free agency

- Trevor Hudgins
- Willie Cauley-Stein
- Darius Days
Players Lost

Via trade
- Christian Wood
- David Nwaba

Via free agency

- Trevelin Queen
- Dennis Schröder

Waived

- John Wall
- Ty Jerome
- Théo Maledon
- Maurice Harkless

=== Trades ===
| June 24, 2022 | To Houston Rockets Sterling Brown; Trey Burke; Marquese Chriss; Boban Marjanović; Draft rights to Wendell Moore Jr. (No. 26) | To Dallas Mavericks Christian Wood |
| June 24, 2022 | To Houston Rockets Draft rights to TyTy Washington (No. 29); 2025 MIN second-round pick 2027 MIN second-round pick | To Minnesota Timberwolves Draft rights to Wendell Moore Jr. (No. 26) |
| September 30, 2022 | To Houston Rockets Derrick Favors; Maurice Harkless; Ty Jerome; Théo Maledon; 2026 second-round pick Cash considerations | To Oklahoma City Thunder Sterling Brown; Trey Burke; Marquese Chriss; David Nwaba |

=== Free agency ===
==== Re-signed ====
| Player | Signed | Ref. |
|---|---|---|
| Jae'Sean Tate | Three year, $22.1 million | |
| Bruno Fernando | Four year, $10.9 million | |

==== Additions ====
| Date | Player | Contract Terms | Former team | Ref. |
|---|---|---|---|---|
| July 1 | Trevor Hudgins | Two-way contract | Northwest Missouri State | |
| October 9 | Willie Cauley-Stein | Standard contract | Philadelphia 76ers | |
| October 11 | Darius Days | Exhibit 10 | Louisiana State | |

==== Subtractions ====
| Date | Player | Reason left | New team | Ref. |
|---|---|---|---|---|
| June 28 | John Wall | Waived | Los Angeles Clippers | |
| July 1 | Trevelin Queen | Free agent | Philadelphia 76ers | |
| September 16 | Dennis Schröder | Free agent | Los Angeles Lakers | |
| October 1 | Ty Jerome | Waived | Golden State Warriors | |
| October 11 | Maurice Harkless | Waived | | |
| October 11 | Théo Maledon | Waived | Charlotte Hornets | |
