= Kevin Porter Jr. =

American basketball player (born 2000)

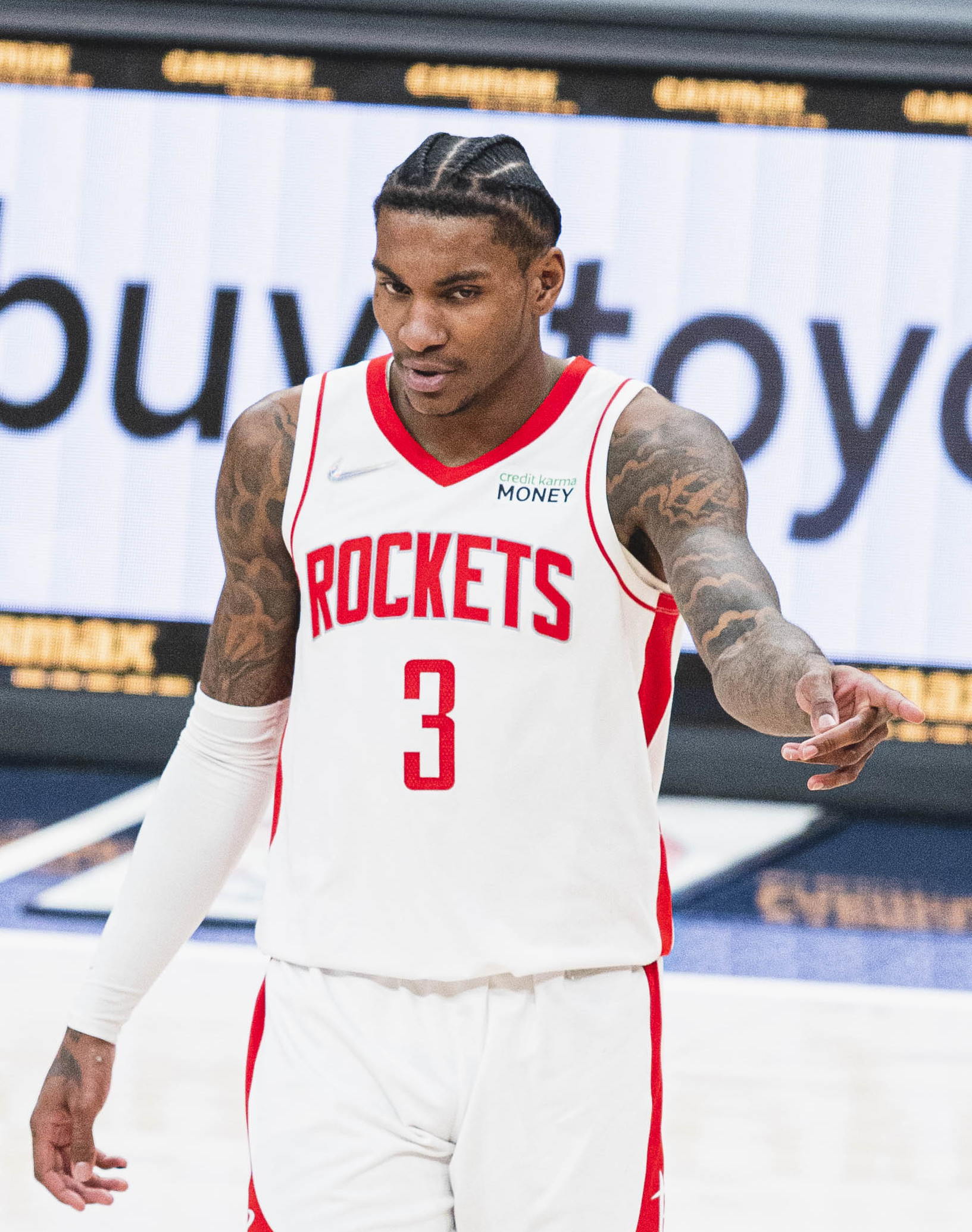
- Porter with the Houston Rockets in 2022

Free agent
- Position: Point guard / small forward

Personal information
- Born: May 4, 2000 (age 26) Seattle, Washington, U.S.
- Listed height: 6 ft 5 in (1.96 m)
- Listed weight: 203 lb (92 kg)

Career information
- High school: Rainier Beach (Seattle, Washington)
- College: USC (2018–2019)
- NBA draft: 2019: 1st round, 30th overall pick
- Drafted by: Milwaukee Bucks
- Playing career: 2019–present

Career history
- 2019–2021: Cleveland Cavaliers
- 2021–2023: Houston Rockets
- 2021: →Rio Grande Valley Vipers
- 2024: PAOK
- 2024–2025: Los Angeles Clippers
- 2025–2026: Milwaukee Bucks

Career highlights
- All-NBA G League First Team (2021); NBA G League scoring leader (2021); NBA G League assists leader (2021); Washington Mr. Basketball (2018)
- Stats at NBA.com
- Stats at Basketball Reference

Bryan Kevin Porter Jr. (born May 4, 2000), also known by his initials KPJ, is an American professional basketball player who is an unrestricted free agent. He last played for the Milwaukee Bucks of the National Basketball Association. He played college basketball for the USC Trojans.

== Early life ==
Porter was born in Seattle, to Ayanna and Bryan Kevin Porter Sr. Porter Sr. died in a shooting in 2004 when Porter Jr. was four years old. As a result, Porter Jr. was raised in South End of Seattle by his mother, who became his role model.

== High school career ==
Porter convinced his mother to enroll him at Rainier Beach High School instead of O'Dea High School in Seattle, because his father had played sports there and he wanted to preserve the tradition. In his senior campaign, he averaged 27 points, 14 rebounds, and five assists, as Rainier Beach finished with a 22–7 record. On March 3, 2018, Porter recorded 22 points and 11 rebounds in a Class 3A state championship game loss to Garfield High School. At the end of the season, he was named Washington Mr. Basketball by the state coaches association.

=== Recruiting ===
Porter was considered a five-star recruit by recruiting services 247Sports and Rivals and a four-star recruit by ESPN. He was the top-ranked player from Washington in the 2018 class and received offers from several NCAA Division I programs, including UCLA, Oregon, and Washington, before committing to USC. Porter became the first USC player since DeMar DeRozan in 2008 to be rated a five-star recruit by Rivals.

College recruiting
Name	Hometown	School	Height	Weight	Commit date
Kevin Porter Jr. SG	Seattle, WA	Rainier Beach (WA)	6 ft 4 in (1.93 m)	195 lb (88 kg)	Jul 2, 2017
Kevin Porter Jr. SG	Recruit ratings: Rivals: 247Sports: ESPN: (89)				
Overall recruit ranking: Rivals: 16 247Sports: 27 ESPN: 40
Note: In many cases, Scout, Rivals, 247Sports, On3, and ESPN may conflict in their listings of height and weight.; In these cases, the average was taken. ESPN grades are on a 100-point scale.; Sources: "USC 2018 Basketball Commitments". Rivals.; "2018 USC Trojans Recruiting Class". ESPN.; "2018 Team Ranking". Rivals.

== College career ==
Porter debuted for USC on November 6, 2018, scoring 15 points off the bench on 6-of-7 shooting in an 83–62 win over Robert Morris. On November 20, against Missouri State, he suffered a quadriceps contusion. He returned on December 1 versus Nevada but left after four minutes because he was hindered by the injury. He missed nine games with a quad contusion, and returned again on January 10, 2019, scoring five points in 25 minutes.

Three days later he was suspended indefinitely by USC for "personal conduct issues". Regardless, Porter stated that he would finish the season with the team and then played in the last three games of the season. He averaged 9.8 points, four rebounds, and 1.4 assists in 22 minutes a game, playing in 21 of USC's 33 games.

At the conclusion of his freshman season, Porter announced his intention to forgo his remaining collegiate eligibility and declare for the 2019 NBA draft.

== Professional career ==
=== Cleveland Cavaliers (2019–2021) ===
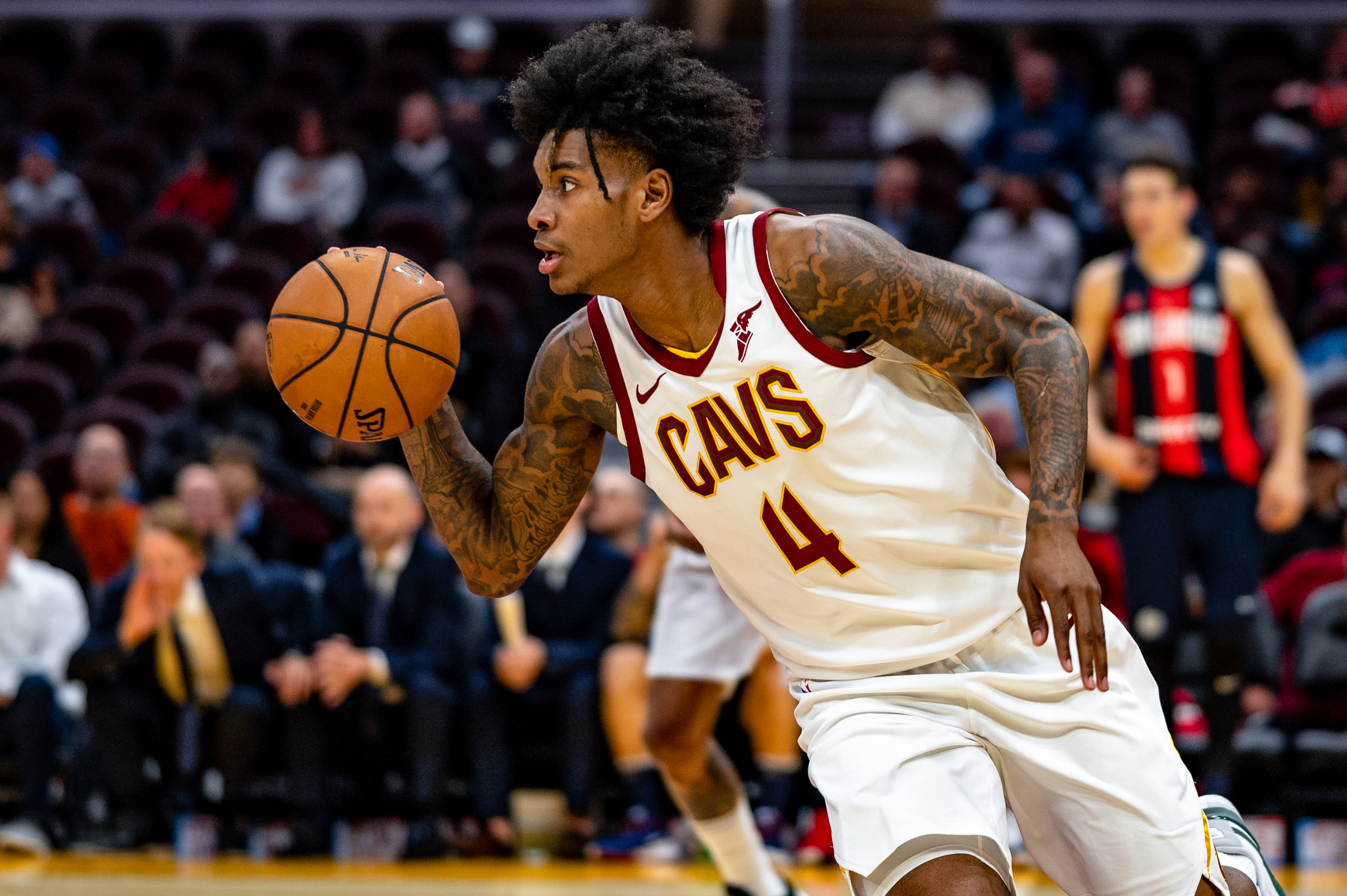
Porter with the Cleveland Cavaliers in 2019

In the 2019 NBA draft, Porter was selected 30th overall by the Milwaukee Bucks but was later traded to the Cleveland Cavaliers via the Detroit Pistons. On July 3, 2019, the Cavaliers announced that they had signed Porter. On October 23, Porter made his debut in the NBA, playing in a 94–85 loss to the Orlando Magic and finishing with one rebound, two assists, and a steal. On November 4, Porter was suspended for one game without pay for improperly making contact with a game official. His first NBA start for the Cavaliers came on November 19 against the New York Knicks in a 123–105 loss, where he recorded a then career-high 18 points in 31 minutes.

Porter started the 2020–21 season inactive due to his off-season weapons charge, which was later dropped. On January 18, 2021, the Cavaliers announced that Porter would either be traded or released following an outburst regarding a locker change following the Cavaliers' acquisition of Taurean Prince from the Brooklyn Nets. He was traded to the Rockets three days later, having not played a single game with the Cavaliers in the 2020–21 season.

=== Houston Rockets (2021–2023) ===
On January 21, 2021, Porter was traded to the Houston Rockets for a future top 55 protected second round pick. He was later assigned to the Rockets' NBA G League affiliate, the Rio Grande Valley Vipers, debuting for the Vipers in their season opener on February 10. On February 25, he recorded the first triple-double of the G League season, scoring 27 points, collecting 11 rebounds and dishing out 14 assists. On March 6, the Rockets recalled Porter from the Vipers after an impressive performance in the G League.

Porter made his debut with the Rockets on March 11, contributing 13 points, 10 assists and five rebounds in a game lost against the Sacramento Kings. On April 28, Porter was fined $50,000 for violating the league's Health and Safety Protocols. In the next following day after the incident, he scored 50 points and recorded 11 assists in a win against the Milwaukee Bucks, becoming the youngest player in NBA history to have 50+ points and 10+ assists in a game. By the end of the regular season, Porter had only played 26 games with the Rockets due to the many conflicts he was dealing with, averaging 16.6 points, 6.3 assists, 3.8 rebounds, and 3.1 turnovers per game.

On January 1, 2022, during a 124–111 loss to the Denver Nuggets, Porter and teammate Christian Wood got into a verbal altercation with Rockets assistant coach John Lucas at halftime. Porter then threw an object into the locker room and left the Toyota Center, the arena where the Rockets were playing, before the game ended. On January 3, Rockets head coach Stephen Silas stated that he had suspended both Porter and Wood for one game each for their behavior. On March 31, he recorded his first triple double with 30 points, 12 rebounds and 12 assists in a 121–118 loss against Sacramento.

On October 17, 2022, Porter agreed on a four-year, $82.5 million contract extension with the Rockets. On March 23, 2023, he recorded his second triple double with 14 points, 10 rebounds, and 10 assists in a 130–125 loss against Memphis.

On October 17, 2023, Porter was traded to the Oklahoma City Thunder following his domestic assault charge. However, he was waived after the trade was completed.

=== PAOK (2024) ===
On April 2, 2024, Porter signed with Greek club PAOK for the rest of the season. In 6 domestic league matches, he averaged 22 points, 9.8 rebounds, 6.8 assists and 2.8 steals in 39 minutes per contest. Porter posted a triple-double against Panathinaikos with a stat line of 23 points, 14 rebounds and 10 assists, the first in Greek Basket League playoff history.

=== Los Angeles Clippers (2024–2025) ===
On July 10, 2024, Porter signed with the Los Angeles Clippers.

=== Milwaukee Bucks (2025–2026) ===
On February 6, 2025, Porter was traded to the Milwaukee Bucks in exchange for MarJon Beauchamp. On March 5, Porter recorded a 14 assist, 11 rebound, 10 point triple-double during a 137–110 win over the Dallas Mavericks.

On April 27, during the first round of the 2025 playoffs, Porter recorded 23 points, five rebounds, six assists and two steals in a 129–103 loss to the Indiana Pacers in game 4.

On July 7, 2025, Porter was re-signed to a reported two-year, $11 million contract with the Bucks. On October 31, it was announced that Porter would miss at least four weeks due to a torn meniscus in his right knee. He made 38 appearances (including 36 starts) for Milwaukee during the 2025–26 season, averaging 17.4 points, 5.2 rebounds, and 7.4 assists. On April 7, 2026, Porter underwent arthroscopic surgery to repair his right knee and missed the rest of the team's regular season.

On October 19, 2026, Porter was waived by the Bucks.

== Player profile ==
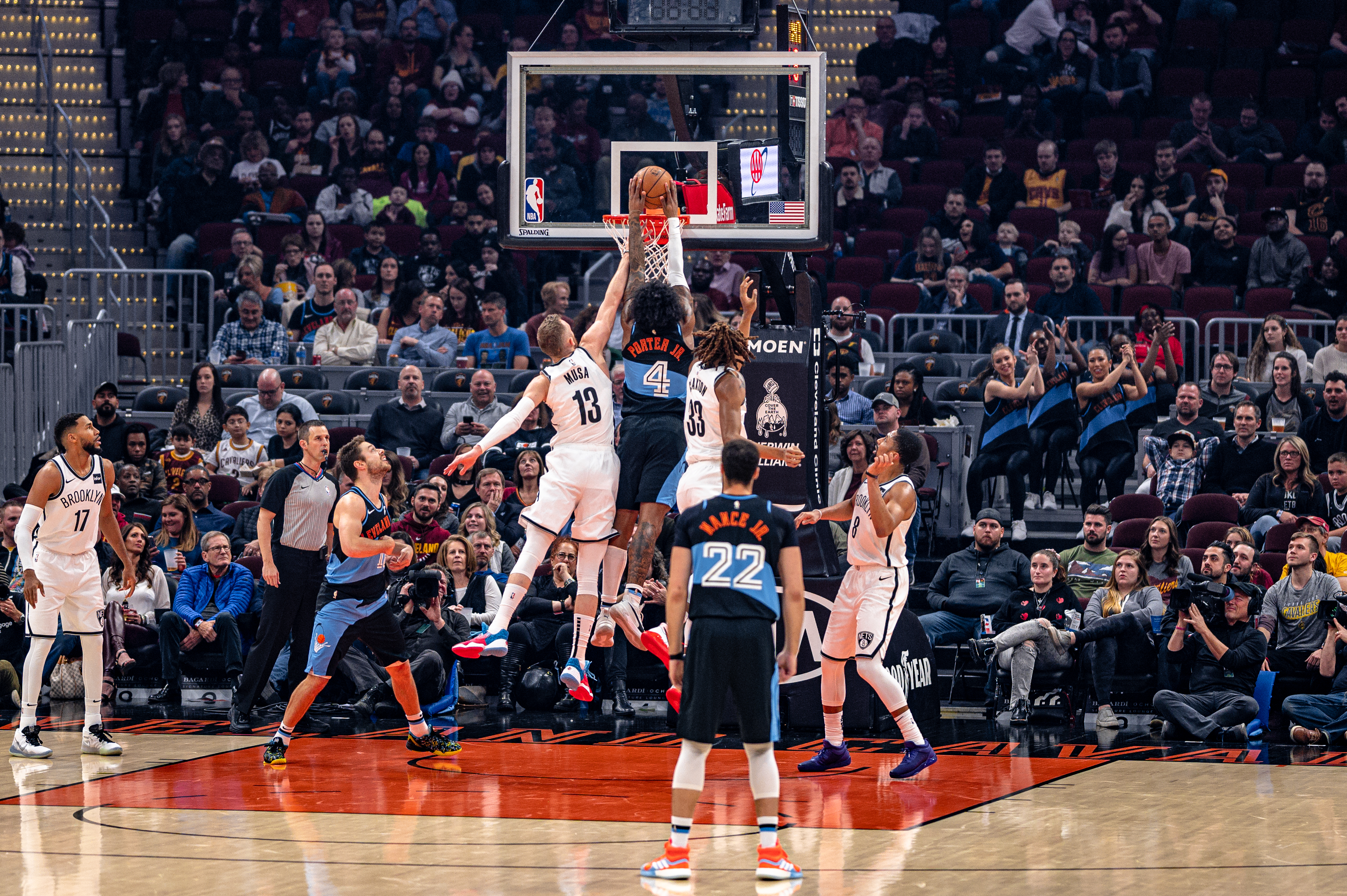
Porter dunking over Džanan Musa of the Brooklyn Nets

Standing at 6 feet 5 inches (1.96 metres) with a 6 feet 9 inches (2.06 metres), Porter plays both the point guard and shooting guard positions. On offense, he possesses a strong isolation game that is complemented by a high level of athleticism that allows him to be an effective scorer on the perimeter, at and above the rim, and in transition. His elite handling skills allow him to create space and defer to either a step-back jumper, a pull-up shot out of a crossover, or a behind-the-back dribble pull-back. Scouts have pointed out his defense and rebounding abilities as another strength, forcing turnovers and running the ball down the court.

At the time of the draft, he was compared to DeShawn Stevenson, Nick Young, JR Smith, James Harden, C.J. Miles, and Kelly Oubre Jr. Since the start of the 2018–19 season, Porter was projected as a first-round prospect for the 2019 NBA draft. He looks up to James Harden, a fellow left-handed guard, citing him as one of the biggest influences on his game.

Analysts identified his shot selection, assist-to-turnover ratio, and foul-shooting as a point of improvement in his game in addition to other miscellaneous off-the-court concerns.

== Personal life ==
=== Weapons charge ===
On November 15, 2020, Porter Jr. was charged by Mahoning County police following a single car accident for improper handling of a firearm in a vehicle. In a statement the Cleveland Cavaliers stated, "We are aware of the situation involving Kevin Porter Jr. and are in the process of gathering information. We have spoken with Kevin and will continue to address this privately with him as the related process evolves."

A grand jury in Mahoning County declined to indict Porter on the felony gun charge. It was determined that both the vehicle and the gun belonged to his mother. Misdemeanor charges of driving without a license were also dropped.

=== Domestic violence charge ===
On September 11, 2023, Porter Jr. was arrested and charged by the New York Police Department for assaulting his girlfriend, Kysre Gondrezick. Gondrezick was left with a cut above her eye and a fractured vertebrae. Afterwards the Houston Rockets barred Porter from having any interaction with the team. After the Rockets traded Porter to the Oklahoma City Thunder on October 17, he was immediately waived by the Thunder. On January 23, 2024, he accepted a deal, pleading guilty to a misdemeanor charge of reckless assault and a second-degree harassment violation.

== Career statistics ==
Legend
GP	Games played	GS	Games started	MPG	Minutes per game
FG%	Field goal percentage	3P%	3-point field goal percentage	FT%	Free throw percentage
RPG	Rebounds per game	APG	Assists per game	SPG	Steals per game
BPG	Blocks per game	PPG	Points per game	**Bold**	Career high

=== NBA ===
==== Regular season ====
Year	Team	GP	GS	MPG	FG%	3P%	FT%	RPG	APG	SPG	BPG	PPG
2019–20	Cleveland	50	3	23.2	.442	.335	.723	3.2	2.2	.9	.3	10.0
2020–21	Houston	26	23	32.1	.400	.368	.734	3.8	6.3	.7	.3	16.6
2021–22	Houston	**61**	**61**	31.3	.415	.375	.642	4.4	6.2	1.1	.4	15.6
2022–23	Houston	59	59	**34.3**	.442	.366	.784	**5.3**	5.7	1.4	.3	**19.2**
2024–25	L.A. Clippers	45	2	19.6	.423	.245	.645	3.6	3.2	1.0	.2	9.3
2024–25	Milwaukee	30	2	19.9	**.494**	**.408**	.871	3.9	3.7	1.3	.1	11.7
2025–26	Milwaukee	38	36	33.2	.465	.322	**.878**	5.2	**7.4**	**2.2**	**.5**	17.4
Career		309	186	28.1	.439	.348	.757	4.3	4.9	1.2	.3	14.4

==== Playoffs ====
Year	Team	GP	GS	MPG	FG%	3P%	FT%	RPG	APG	SPG	BPG	PPG
2025	Milwaukee	5	1	30.2	.396	.467	.846	3.6	5.4	.8	.0	11.2
Career		5	1	30.2	.396	.467	.846	3.6	5.4	.8	.0	11.2

=== College ===
Year	Team	GP	GS	MPG	FG%	3P%	FT%	RPG	APG	SPG	BPG	PPG
2018–19	USC	21	4	22.1	.471	.412	.522	4.0	1.4	.8	.5	9.5
