= Jae'Sean Tate =

American basketball player (born 1995)

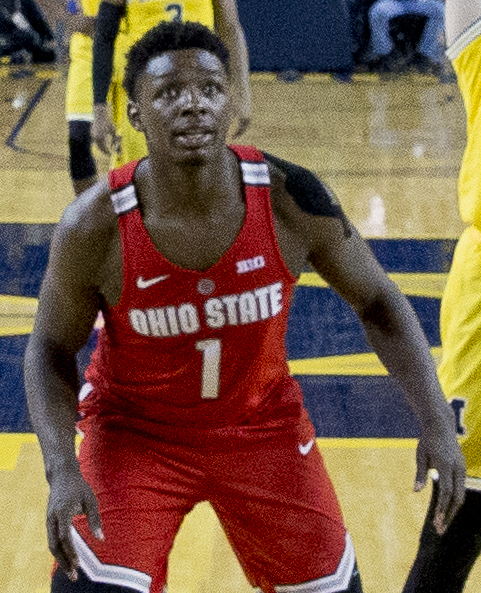
- Tate with Ohio State in 2018

No. 8 – Houston Rockets
- Position: Small forward
- League: NBA

Personal information
- Born: October 28, 1995 (age 31) Toledo, Ohio, U.S.
- Listed height: 6 ft 4 in (1.93 m)
- Listed weight: 239 lb (108 kg)

Career information
- High school: Pickerington Central (Pickerington, Ohio)
- College: Ohio State (2014–2018)
- NBA draft: 2018: undrafted
- Playing career: 2018–present

Career history
- 2018–2019: Antwerp Giants
- 2019–2020: Sydney Kings
- 2020–present: Houston Rockets
- 2025: →Rio Grande Valley Vipers

Career highlights
- NBA All-Rookie First Team (2021); All-NBL First Team (2020); Belgian Cup winner (2019); Belgian League All-Star (2019); Belgian League All-Offensive Team (2019); Second-team All-Big Ten (2018); Big Ten All-Freshman Team (2015)
- Stats at NBA.com
- Stats at Basketball Reference

Jae'Sean Antoine Tate (/ˈdʒeɪʃɔːn/ JAY-shawn; born October 28, 1995) is an American professional basketball player for the Houston Rockets of the National Basketball Association (NBA). He played college basketball for the Ohio State Buckeyes in the Big Ten Conference. Tate is represented by Beyond Athlete Management. Tate started his career overseas before joining the Rockets in 2020.

== Early life ==
Tate is the oldest son of Jermaine Tate, who played basketball with the Ohio State Buckeyes in 1996–97 before transferring to Cincinnati and playing professionally overseas. His mother, Cori Key, was stabbed to death by her boyfriend Damiene Boles on July 31, 2004. Boles was convicted of the murder three years later. After his mother's death, Tate was raised by his father and stepmom Jenice alongside their three children. Tate went through anger management to process his emotions and has a tattoo of a key on his leg.

Tate attended Pickerington High School Central, where he excelled at basketball and football. He played defensive end and tight end before a shoulder injury cut his junior season short, and he focused on basketball from then on. On the hardwood, Tate was a teammate of Caris LeVert and made the game-winning tip-in in a playoff win over Columbus Marion-Franklin as a freshman. As a sophomore, his team went 26–2 and won the 2012 Division I championship defeating Toledo Whitmer in the final game. In both his junior and senior years, Tate went on to be a first-team all-conference player. He injured his shoulder as a junior, shortening his season, but still averaged 22.3 points, 12 rebounds, and three assists per game. Tate ended his high school career as the number 1 ranked player in Ohio and the 15th ranked forward in the nation in the ESPN top 100.

== College career ==
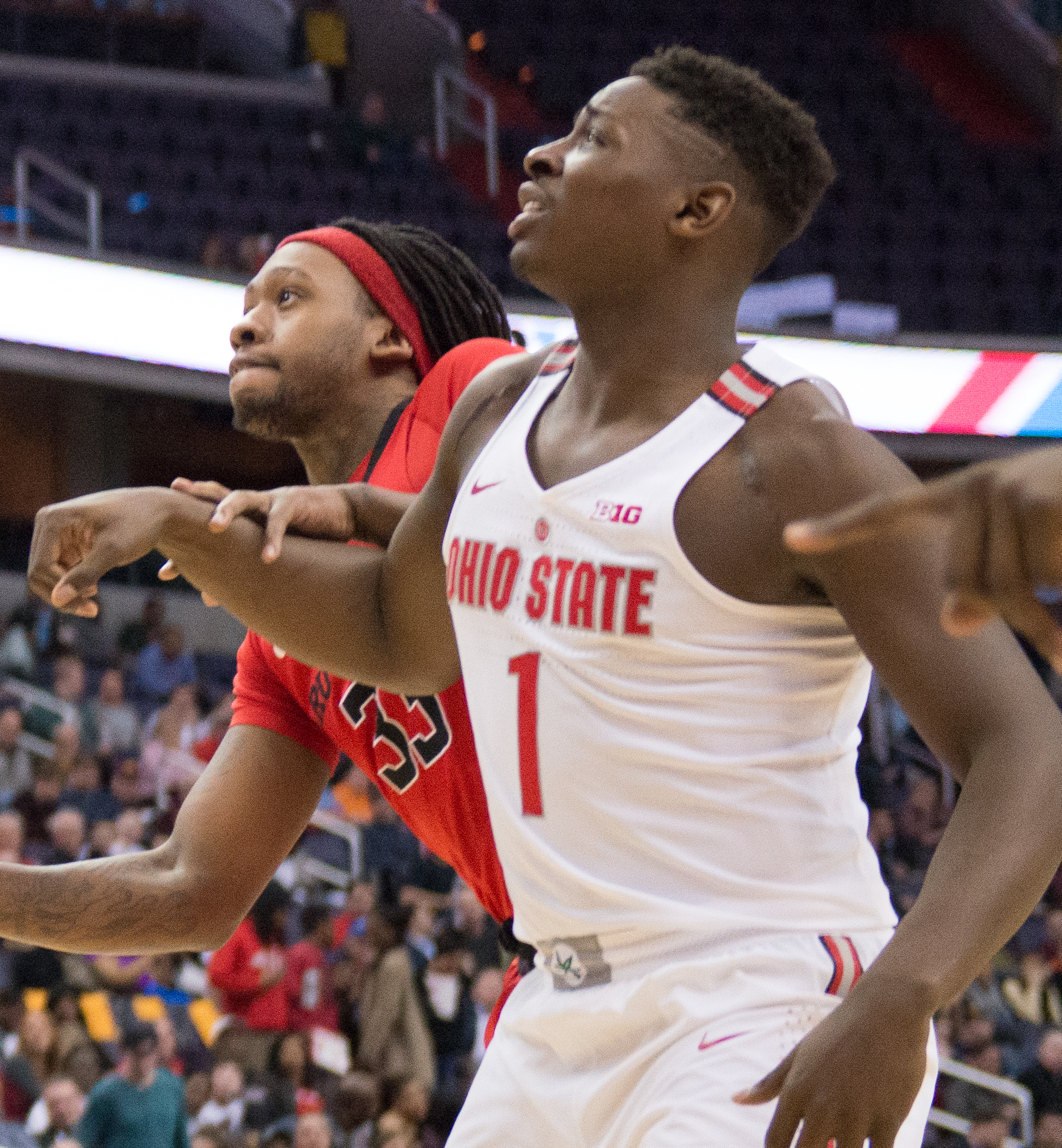
Tate boxes out Rutgers' Deshawn Freeman in 2017

As a freshman, Tate posted 8.8 points and 5 rebounds per game. His averages climbed to 12.1 points and 5.5 rebounds per game since becoming a full-time starter against Northwestern on January 22, 2015. Tate was a Big Ten All-Freshman Team selection. Despite standing 6'4", Tate sometimes played center on a Buckeyes team that featured 6'5" point guard D'Angelo Russell. Tate averaged 11.7 points, 6.4 rebounds, and 1.5 assists per game as a sophomore. He missed the final seven games with a shoulder injury. He was a Big Ten Honorable Mention selection.

Tate was an honorable mention All-Big Ten selection as a junior. As a junior, Tate led the Buckeyes in scoring with 14.3 points per game, taking the primary role on offense due to an injury to Keita Bates-Diop. Toward the end of his junior season, Tate contemplated giving up basketball and walking on to Ohio State's football team. He described a locker room situation in which players had completely given up on the team and did not even want to play in the NIT. A conversation with coach Thad Matta and assistant coach Greg Paulus persuaded Tate to return to the floor for his senior year. He had second thoughts after Matta was fired in favor of Chris Holtmann, but Holtmann and Tate developed a strong relationship.

As a senior, Tate was a captain alongside a healthy Bates-Diop, and had some impressive moments including setting an Ohio State record going 10-for-10 from the field in a win over Northeastern in November 2017. Tate scored 14 points going 6-for-11 from the field in a comeback victory over Michigan in December. He averaged 12.3 points and 6.2 rebounds per game as a senior on an NCAA Tournament squad that finished 25–9. He was named second-team All-Big Ten by the coaches and honorable mention all-conference by the media. Tate finished as Ohio State's 19th-leading scorer with 1,512 points. After the season, he worked with coach Joey Burton to improve his shooting technique in preparation for a professional career.

== Professional career ==
=== Antwerp Giants (2018–2019) ===
After going undrafted in the 2018 NBA draft, Tate joined the Milwaukee Bucks for the 2018 NBA Summer League. However, he was unable to play for the Bucks due to a fractured finger on his right hand. On August 20, 2018, he signed in Belgium with the Antwerp Giants. While with the Antwerp Giants, Tate was a Belgian League all-star and helped lead the Giants to their first Belgian Cup title in 12 years. In 42 league games, he averaged 10.2 points, 3.9 rebounds, and 1.7 assists per game. He also averaged 13.0 points, 5.6 rebounds, and 1.6 assists in 24 BCL games.

=== Sydney Kings (2019–2020) ===
On July 22, 2019, Tate signed with the Sydney Kings of the Australian National Basketball League (NBL) for the 2019–20 NBL season. He averaged 16.4 points, 2 assists, and 5.8 rebounds per game and was named to the All-NBL First Team.

=== Houston Rockets (2020–2026) ===
On November 26, 2020, Tate signed with the Houston Rockets of the National Basketball Association (NBA). Tate made his NBA debut on December 26, playing 37 minutes against the Portland Trail Blazers; he recorded 13 points, four rebounds, and two assists in the overtime loss. He started a team-high 58 games during the season and averaged 11.3 points, 5.3 rebounds, and 2.5 assists. Tate was selected to the NBA All-Rookie First Team at the end of the season, becoming only the second undrafted player to claim such honors.

On December 1, 2021, Tate scored a career-high 32 points while also adding 10 rebounds, 7 assists, 5 blocks, and 2 steals in a win over the Oklahoma City Thunder, becoming only the second Houston Rockets player after Hakeem Olajuwon to achieve these totals in a single game.

On July 6, 2022, Tate re-signed with the Rockets on a three-year, $22.1 million contract. On January 15, 2023, the NBA suspended Tate for one game without pay for leaving the bench area during an altercation between the Rockets and the Sacramento Kings two days earlier.

Tate made 52 appearances (two starts) for Houston during the 2024–25 NBA season, averaging 3.6 points, 2.3 rebounds, and 0.9 assists. On July 1, 2025, Tate re-signed with the Rockets on a one-year, $3 million contract.

On February 23, 2026, Tate was ruled out for at least 4-to-6 weeks due to a Grade 2 MCL sprain in his right knee. He made 46 total appearances (including one start) for Houston during the 2025–26 season, averaging 2.8 points, 1.6 rebounds, and 0.5 assists.

On July 23, 2026, Tate re–signed with the Rockets on a one–year, minimum–salary contract that included a partial guarantee.

== Career statistics ==
Legend
GP	Games played	GS	Games started	MPG	Minutes per game
FG%	Field goal percentage	3P%	3-point field goal percentage	FT%	Free throw percentage
RPG	Rebounds per game	APG	Assists per game	SPG	Steals per game
BPG	Blocks per game	PPG	Points per game	**Bold**	Career high

=== NBA ===
==== Regular season ====
Year	Team	GP	GS	MPG	FG%	3P%	FT%	RPG	APG	SPG	BPG	PPG
2020–21	Houston	70	58	**29.2**	.506	.308	.694	5.3	2.5	**1.2**	**.5**	11.3
2021–22	Houston	**78**	**77**	26.4	.498	.312	.707	**5.4**	**2.8**	.9	**.5**	**11.8**
2022–23	Houston	31	7	21.9	.480	.283	**.725**	3.8	2.7	.7	.2	9.1
2023–24	Houston	65	9	15.9	.472	.299	.667	3.0	1.0	.6	.2	4.1
2024–25	Houston	52	2	11.3	.473	**.348**	.681	2.3	.9	.5	.1	3.6
2025–26	Houston	46	1	8.8	**.514**	.313	.636	1.6	.5	.2	.1	2.8
Career		343	154	19.9	.494	.309	.698	3.8	1.8	.7	.3	7.5

==== Playoffs ====
Year	Team	GP	GS	MPG	FG%	3P%	FT%	RPG	APG	SPG	BPG	PPG
2026	Houston	5	0	6.0	.300	.000	.667	2.0	.0	.2	.0	2.0
Career		5	0	6.0	.300	.000	.667	2.0	.0	.2	.0	2.0

=== College ===
Year	Team	GP	GS	MPG	FG%	3P%	FT%	RPG	APG	SPG	BPG	PPG
2014–15	Ohio State	**35**	16	22.0	**.589**	.158	.520	5.0	.3	.9	**.6**	8.8
2015–16	Ohio State	28	28	29.0	.521	**.350**	.518	**6.4**	1.5	**1.3**	.3	11.7
2016–17	Ohio State	32	32	**31.9**	.547	.222	.573	**6.4**	2.0	1.1	.5	**14.3**
2017–18	Ohio State	34	**34**	29.6	.557	.314	**.591**	6.2	**2.9**	1.1	**.6**	12.3
Career		129	110	28.0	.552	.277	.555	6.0	1.7	1.1	.5	11.7

== Player profile ==
Standing at 6 feet 4 inches (1.93 m), Tate plays the small forward and power forward positions. During his rookie season with the Houston Rockets, Tate gained a reputation as a strong defender, with his play often compared to PJ Tucker. A predominately left-handed player with a strong drive, Tate finishes well at the rim, scoring 69% of his attempts as a rookie.
