= Daishen Nix =

American basketball player (born 2002)

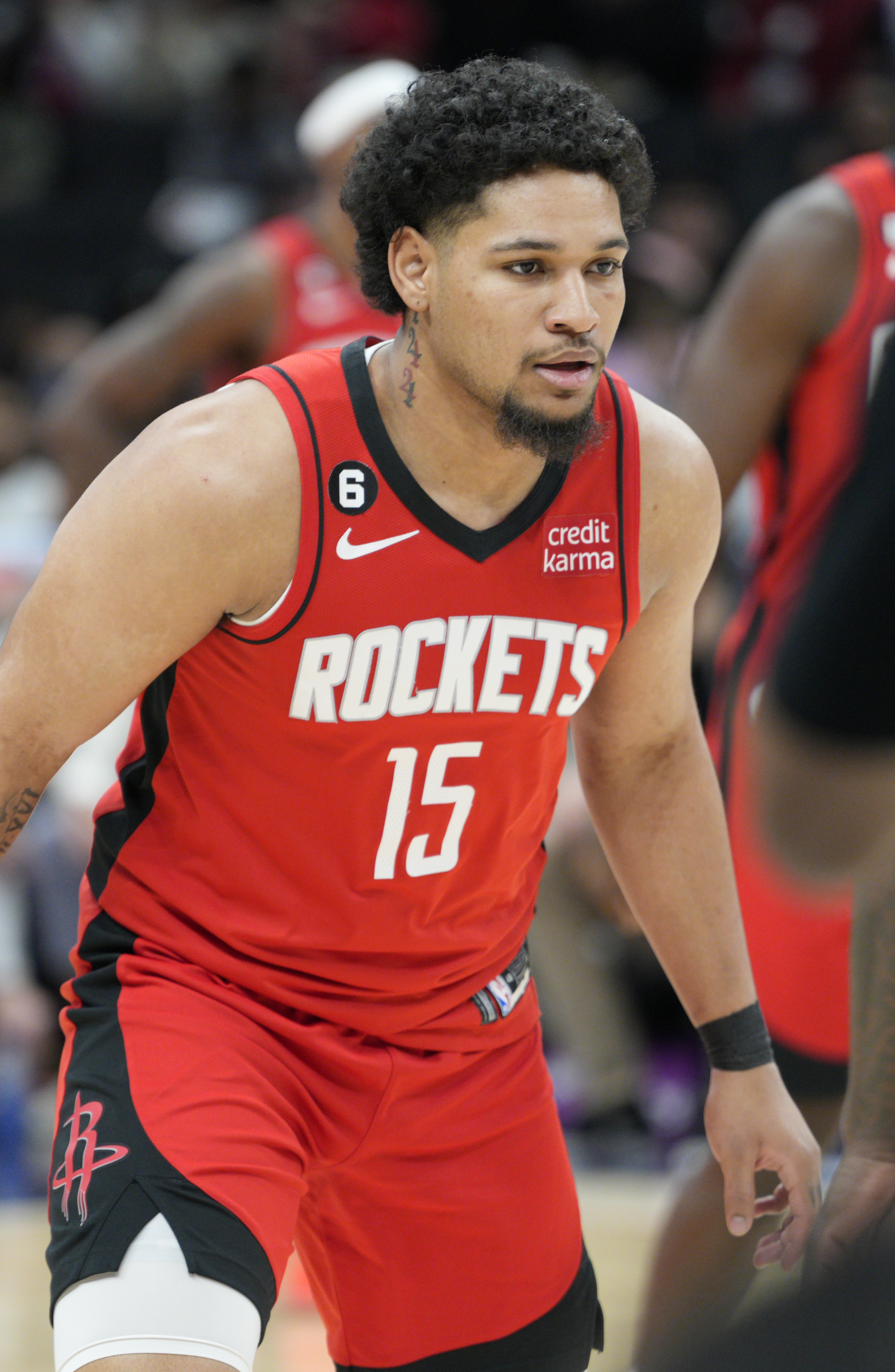
- Nix with the Houston Rockets in 2023

No. 2 – Tianjin Pioneers
- Position: Point guard
- League: CBA

Personal information
- Born: February 13, 2002 (age 24) Fairbanks, Alaska, U.S.
- Listed height: 6 ft 4 in (1.93 m)
- Listed weight: 238 lb (108 kg)

Career information
- High school: Trinity International (Las Vegas, Nevada)
- NBA draft: 2021: undrafted
- Playing career: 2020–present

Career history
- 2020–2021: NBA G League Ignite
- 2021–2023: Houston Rockets
- 2021–2022: →Rio Grande Valley Vipers
- 2023–2025: Minnesota Timberwolves
- 2023–2025: →Iowa Wolves
- 2025–2026: Rio Grande Valley Vipers
- 2026: Shanxi Loongs
- 2026: Beijing Royal Fighters
- 2026–present: Tianjin Pioneers

Career highlights
- NBA G League champion (2022); All-NBA G League Third Team (2026); McDonald's All-American (2020)
- Stats at NBA.com
- Stats at Basketball Reference

Daishen Feao Nix (/ˈdeɪʃən ˈnɪks/ DAY-shən NIKS; born February 13, 2002) is an American professional basketball player for the Tianjin Pioneers of the Chinese Basketball Association (CBA). He was a consensus five-star recruit and one of the best point guards in the 2020 class. A former UCLA signee, Nix bypassed playing college basketball and joined the NBA G League Ignite. At the high school level, he competed for Trinity International School in Las Vegas, Nevada.

== Early life ==
Nix was born in Fairbanks, Alaska and raised in Anchorage, Alaska. He played basketball for Mears Middle School in Anchorage. After eighth grade, at age 13, Nix moved to Las Vegas, upon his mother's advice, to gain more basketball exposure and to live closer to his extended family.

In high school, Nix played for Trinity International School in Las Vegas. As a junior, Nix averaged 19.9 points, 6.2 rebounds and 5.1 assists per game, leading his team to its second straight National Christian School Athletic Association (NCSAA) Division I title. He finished his junior season as NCSAA Player of the Year and as his team's all-time leader in points, rebounds and assists. On October 15, 2019, as a senior, Nix registered a triple-double of 45 points, 11 assists and 10 steals in a win over PHH Prep. In March 2020, he shared Grind Session most valuable player honors with Jalen Green. Nix was selected to play in the McDonald's All-American Game, which was canceled due to the COVID-19 pandemic. In addition to his high school basketball, Nix competed for independent team Simply Fundamental, which was owned and operated by his high school coach and legal guardian, Greg Lockridge.

On August 20, 2019, Nix committed to playing college basketball for UCLA over offers from Alabama, Kansas, Kentucky and Maryland. On November 13, 2019, he signed a National Letter of Intent with the Bruins. On April 28, 2020, Nix decommitted from UCLA and announced that he would forgo his college eligibility to join the NBA G League Ignite.

College recruiting
| Name | Hometown | School | Height | Weight | Commit date |
|---|---|---|---|---|---|
| Daishen Nix; PG | Anchorage, AK | Trinity International (NV) | 6 ft 5 in (1.96 m) | 205 lb (93 kg) | Aug 20, 2019 |
| Daishen Nix; PG | Recruit ratings: Rivals: 247Sports: ESPN: (94) | | | | |
Overall recruit ranking: Rivals: 15 247Sports: 15 ESPN: 21
Note: In many cases, Scout, Rivals, 247Sports, On3, and ESPN may conflict in their listings of height and weight.; In these cases, the average was taken. ESPN grades are on a 100-point scale.; Sources: "UCLA 2020 Basketball Commitments". Rivals.; "2020 UCLA Bruins Recruiting Class". ESPN.; "2020 Team Ranking". Rivals.

== Professional career ==
=== NBA G League Ignite (2021) ===
On April 28, 2020, Nix signed a one-year, $300,000 contract with the NBA G League Ignite, a developmental team affiliated with the NBA G League. He explained his decision by saying, "I think it was the right thing for me because it was a family thing and a myself thing. Playing in G League is basically getting me ready for the NBA draft. It's just one step below the NBA." Nix averaged 8.8 points, 5.3 rebounds and 5.3 assists per game.

=== Houston Rockets / Rio Grande Valley Vipers (2021–2023) ===
After going undrafted in the 2021 NBA draft, Nix joined the Philadelphia 76ers for the 2021 NBA Summer League. On August 25, 2021, he signed with the Houston Rockets and on October 16, they turned his deal into a two-way contract. Under the terms of the deal, he split time between the Rockets and their NBA G League affiliate, the Rio Grande Valley Vipers.

On February 15, 2022, the Rockets converted Nix's contract into a standard deal.

On June 29, 2023, Nix was waived by the Rockets.

=== Minnesota Timberwolves / Iowa Wolves (2023–2025) ===
On September 28, 2023, Nix signed with the Minnesota Timberwolves and on October 20, his deal was converted into a two-way contract.

On July 11, 2024, Nix signed another two-way contract with the Timberwolves. On January 3, 2025, Nix was waived by Minnesota.

=== Second stint with Rio Grande Valley (2025–2026) ===
On January 11, 2025, Nix joined the Rio Grande Valley Vipers.

On February 8, 2025, Nix signed a 10-day contract with the Sacramento Kings, but never appeared in a game for the team. He returned to the Vipers following the end of his 10-day contract with the Kings.

=== Shanxi Loongs (2026) ===
On April 17, 2026, Nix signed with the Shanxi Loongs of the Chinese Basketball Association.

=== Beijing Royal Fighters (2026) ===
In September 2026, Nix joined the Beijing Royal Fighters of the Chinese Basketball Association for the FIBA Intercontinental Cup.

== Career statistics ==
Legend
| GP | Games played | GS | Games started | MPG | Minutes per game |
| FG% | Field goal percentage | 3P% | 3-point field goal percentage | FT% | Free throw percentage |
| RPG | Rebounds per game | APG | Assists per game | SPG | Steals per game |
| BPG | Blocks per game | PPG | Points per game | **Bold** | Career high |

=== NBA ===
| Year | Team | GP | GS | MPG | FG% | 3P% | FT% | RPG | APG | SPG | BPG | PPG |
|---|---|---|---|---|---|---|---|---|---|---|---|---|
| 2021–22 | Houston | 24 | 0 | 10.9 | **.403** | .269 | .533 | 1.4 | 1.7 | **.6** | .0 | 3.2 |
| 2022–23 | Houston | **57** | **7** | **16.0** | .342 | .286 | **.667** | **1.7** | **2.3** | .5 | **.1** | **4.0** |
| 2023–24 | Minnesota | 15 | 0 | 3.3 | .375 | **.353** | .500 | .2 | .4 | .3 | .0 | 1.8 |
| 2024–25 | Minnesota | 3 | 0 | 4.4 | .000 | .000 | .500 | 1.3 | 1.0 | .0 | .0 | .3 |
| Career | | 99 | 7 | 12.5 | .356 | .288 | .595 | 1.4 | 1.8 | .5 | .1 | 3.3 |

== Personal life ==
Nix is of Samoan descent. His mother, Mina Tupuola, played basketball for Lathrop High School in Fairbanks, Alaska and attended the University of Alaska Fairbanks.
