= 2021–22 Houston Rockets season =

- Head coach: Stephen Silas
- President: Gretchen Sheirr
- General manager: Rafael Stone
- Owner: Tilman Fertitta
- Arena: Toyota Center

Results
- Record: 20–62 (.244)
- Place: Division: 5th (Southwest); Conference: 15th (Western)
- Playoff finish: Did not qualify
- Stats at Basketball Reference

Local media
- Television: AT&T SportsNet Southwest
- Radio: Sportstalk 790

The 2021–22 Houston Rockets season was the 55th season of the franchise in the National Basketball Association (NBA), and 51st season in the city of Houston. On August 20, 2021, the NBA announced that the regular season for the league would begin on October 19, 2021, returning to the typical 82-game schedule following the schedule disruptions that resulted from COVID-19. After a woeful 17–55 record compiled in the previous season following the departure of James Harden in a trade to the Brooklyn Nets, the Rockets started a new era by drafting Jalen Green from the G League with the second overall pick in the 2021 NBA draft.

The Rockets were eliminated from playoff contention for the second consecutive season, which was the first time the Rockets missed the playoffs in consecutive seasons since 2010–12.

== Draft ==
Round	Pick	Player	Position	Nationality	College
1	2	Jalen Green	SG	United States	NBA G League Ignite (NBA G League)
1	23	Usman Garuba	PF/C	Spain	Real Madrid (Spain)
1	24	Josh Christopher	SG	United States	Arizona State (Fr.)

The Rockets held the second pick in the 2021 NBA draft, along with two other first-round picks from the Portland Trail Blazers and the Milwaukee Bucks entering the draft. This was the first time the Rockets had a lottery pick since the 2012 NBA draft, in which they selected Jeremy Lamb with the twelfth overall pick. It was also their first time with a top-4 pick since the 2002 NBA draft, in which they selected Yao Ming with the first overall pick.

The Rockets traded two future first-round picks (Note: The Rockets traded a 2022 protected first-round pick from the Detroit Pistons and a 2023 protected first-round pick from the Washington Wizards. The Detroit pick is protected top-16 in 2022, top-18 in 2023, top-18 in 2024, top-13 in 2025, top-11 in 2026, and top-9 in 2027. It will turn into a 2027 second if not conveyed.) to the Oklahoma City Thunder for the draft rights to Turkish center Alperen Şengün of the Beşiktaş Icrypex. In addition to that pick, the Rockets would select the first ever player from the experimental NBA G League Ignite franchise in forward Jalen Green with the #2 pick of the draft, as well as select Spanish power forward/center Usman Garuba from Real Madrid Baloncesto and shooting guard Josh Christopher from Arizona State University as back-to-back late first round selections.

== Roster ==
2021–22 Houston Rockets roster
Players

Pos.	No.	Player	Height	Weight	DOB	From
G	9	Josh Christopher	6 ft 3 in (1.91 m)	215 lb (98 kg)	2001-12-08	Arizona State
C	20	Bruno Fernando	6 ft 10 in (2.08 m)	240 lb (109 kg)	1998-08-15	Maryland
F	16	Usman Garuba	6 ft 8 in (2.03 m)	229 lb (104 kg)	2002-03-09	Spain
G	10	Eric Gordon (injured)	6 ft 3 in (1.91 m)	215 lb (98 kg)	1988-12-25	Indiana
G	0	Jalen Green	6 ft 4 in (1.93 m)	186 lb (84 kg)	2002-02-09	Prolific Prep (CA)
F	33	Anthony Lamb (TW)	6 ft 6 in (1.98 m)	227 lb (103 kg)	1998-01-20	Vermont
F	6	Kenyon Martin	6 ft 6 in (1.98 m)	215 lb (98 kg)	2001-01-06	IMG Academy (FL)
G	25	Garrison Mathews	6 ft 5 in (1.96 m)	215 lb (98 kg)	1996-10-24	Lipscomb
G	15	Daishen Nix	6 ft 3 in (1.91 m)	226 lb (103 kg)	2002-02-13	Trinity International (NV)
G/F	2	David Nwaba	6 ft 5 in (1.96 m)	219 lb (99 kg)	1993-01-14	Cal Poly
G	3	Kevin Porter	6 ft 4 in (1.93 m)	203 lb (92 kg)	2000-05-04	USC
G	21	Trevelin Queen (TW)	6 ft 6 in (1.98 m)	190 lb (86 kg)	1997-02-25	New Mexico State
G	17	Dennis Schröder (injured)	6 ft 1 in (1.85 m)	172 lb (78 kg)	1993-09-15	Germany
C	28	Alperen Şengün	6 ft 11 in (2.11 m)	243 lb (110 kg)	2002-07-25	Turkey
F	8	Jae'Sean Tate	6 ft 5 in (1.96 m)	230 lb (104 kg)	1995-10-28	Ohio State
G	1	John Wall (injured)	6 ft 3 in (1.91 m)	210 lb (95 kg)	1990-09-06	Kentucky
F/C	35	Christian Wood (injured)	6 ft 9 in (2.06 m)	214 lb (97 kg)	1995-09-27	UNLV

Coaches
Head coach
- Stephen Silas
Assistant(s)
- DeSagana Diop
- Rick Higgins
- Jeff Hornacek
- John Lucas
- Will Weaver

Legend
- (DP) Unsigned draft pick
- (FA) Free agent
- (S) Suspended
- (GL) On assignment to G League affiliate
- (TW) Two-way affiliate player
- Injured

Roster
Updated: April 15, 2022

=== Roster Notes ===
- Point guard John Wall missed the entire season due to a hamstring injury.

== Standings ==
=== Division ===
Southwest Division	W	L	PCT	GB	Home	Road	Div	GP
y – Memphis Grizzlies	56	26	.683	–	30‍–‍11	26‍–‍15	11–5	82
x – Dallas Mavericks	52	30	.634	4.0	29‍–‍12	23‍–‍18	14–2	82
x – New Orleans Pelicans	36	46	.439	20.0	19‍–‍22	17‍–‍24	6–10	82
pi − San Antonio Spurs	34	48	.415	22.0	16‍–‍25	18‍–‍23	6–10	82
Houston Rockets	20	62	.244	36.0	11‍–‍30	9‍–‍32	3–13	82

=== Conference ===
Western Conference
#	Team	W	L	PCT	GB	GP
1	z – Phoenix Suns *	64	18	.780	–	82
2	y – Memphis Grizzlies *	56	26	.683	8.0	82
3	x – Golden State Warriors	53	29	.646	11.0	82
4	x – Dallas Mavericks	52	30	.634	12.0	82
5	y – Utah Jazz *	49	33	.598	15.0	82
6	x – Denver Nuggets	48	34	.585	16.0	82
7	x – Minnesota Timberwolves	46	36	.561	18.0	82
8	pi – Los Angeles Clippers	42	40	.512	22.0	82
9	x – New Orleans Pelicans	36	46	.439	28.0	82
10	pi − San Antonio Spurs	34	48	.415	30.0	82
11	Los Angeles Lakers	33	49	.402	31.0	82
12	Sacramento Kings	30	52	.366	34.0	82
13	Portland Trail Blazers	27	55	.329	37.0	82
14	Oklahoma City Thunder	24	58	.293	40.0	82
15	Houston Rockets	20	62	.244	44.0	82

Notes

- z – Clinched home court advantage for the entire playoffs
- y – Clinched division title
- x – Clinched playoff spot
- pi – Clinched play-in tournament spot
- * – Division leader

== Game log ==
The preseason and regular season schedule were announced on August 20, 2021.

=== Preseason ===
2021 preseason game log
Preseason: 1–3 (home: 1–1; road: 0–2)

Game	Date	Team	Score	High points	High rebounds	High assists	Location Attendance	Record
1	October 5	Washington	W 125–119	Kevin Porter Jr. (25)	Alperen Şengün (8)	Kevin Porter Jr. (5)	Toyota Center; 11,495	1–0
2	October 7	Miami	L 106–113	Jalen Green (20)	Martin Jr., Wood (8)	Dante Exum (6)	Toyota Center; 10,491	1–1
3	October 11	@ Toronto	L 92–107	Armoni Brooks (15)	Christian Wood (7)	Green, Porter Jr. (4)	Scotiabank Arena; 9,245	1–2
4	October 15	@ San Antonio	L 98–126	Christian Wood (19)	Christian Wood (19)	Kevin Porter Jr. (4)	AT&T Center; 17,676	1–3

2021–22 preseason schedule

=== Regular season ===
2021–22 game log
Total: 20–62 (Home: 11–30; Road: 9–32)
October: 1–5 (home: 1–2; road: 0–3)

Game	Date	Team	Score	High points	High rebounds	High assists	Location Attendance	Record
1	October 20	@ Minnesota	L 106–124	Christian Wood (16)	Christian Wood (9)	Jalen Green (4)	Target Center; 16,079	0–1
2	October 22	Oklahoma City	W 124–91	Christian Wood (29)	Tate, Wood (14)	Kevin Porter Jr. (9)	Toyota Center; 15,674	1–1
3	October 24	Boston	L 97–107	Jalen Green (30)	Christian Wood (9)	Şengün, Tate (4)	Toyota Center; 16,069	1–2
4	October 26	@ Dallas	L 106–116	Eric Gordon (22)	Christian Wood (17)	Kevin Porter Jr. (8)	American Airlines Center; 19,337	1–3
5	October 28	Utah	L 91–122	Christian Wood (16)	Christian Wood (7)	Green, Gordon (3)	Toyota Center; 15,858	1–4
6	October 31	@ L.A. Lakers	L 85–95	Eric Gordon (17)	Christian Wood (13)	Jalen Green (5)	Staples Center; 16,448	1–5

November: 3–11 (home: 3–3; road: 0–8)

Game	Date	Team	Score	High points	High rebounds	High assists	Location Attendance	Record
7	November 2	@ L.A. Lakers	L 117–119	Christian Wood (26)	Christian Wood (16)	Kevin Porter Jr. (8)	Staples Center; 18,997	1–6
8	November 4	@ Phoenix	L 111–123	Kevin Porter Jr. (20)	Christian Wood (15)	Şengün, Wood (5)	Footprint Center; 15,058	1–7
9	November 6	@ Denver	L 94–95	Daniel Theis (18)	Christian Wood (17)	Kevin Porter Jr. (4)	Ball Arena; 16,046	1–8
10	November 7	@ Golden State	L 107–120	Jae'Sean Tate (21)	Jae'Sean Tate (10)	Kevin Porter Jr. (7)	Chase Center; 18,064	1–9
11	November 10	Detroit	L 104–112	Jalen Green (23)	Christian Wood (9)	Kevin Porter Jr. (5)	Toyota Center; 15,350	1–10
12	November 12	Portland	L 92–104	Kevin Porter Jr. (18)	Christian Wood (15)	Kevin Porter Jr. (5)	Toyota Center; 15,468	1–11
13	November 14	Phoenix	L 89–115	Christian Wood (17)	Alperen Şengün (10)	Kevin Porter Jr. (6)	Toyota Center; 16,088	1–12
14	November 15	@ Memphis	L 102–136	Jalen Green (15)	Jae'Sean Tate (9)	Augustin, Christopher (5)	FedExForum; 11,482	1–13
15	November 17	@ Oklahoma City	L 89–101	Jalen Green (21)	Christian Wood (14)	Eric Gordon (5)	Paycom Center; 12,066	1–14
16	November 20	@ New York	L 99–106	Christian Wood (18)	Christian Wood (12)	Eric Gordon (5)	Madison Square Garden; 19,812	1–15
17	November 22	@ Boston	L 90–108	Armoni Brooks (17)	Christian Wood (9)	Alperen Şengün (7)	TD Garden; 19,156	1–16
18	November 24	Chicago	W 118–113	Danuel House (18)	Christian Wood (10)	Kevin Porter Jr. (9)	Toyota Center; 16,074	2–16
19	November 27	Charlotte	W 146–143 (OT)	Christian Wood (33)	Christian Wood (16)	Kevin Porter Jr. (12)	Toyota Center; 14,687	3–16
20	November 29	Oklahoma City	W 102–89	Christian Wood (24)	Christian Wood (21)	Kevin Porter Jr. (11)	Toyota Center; 12,829	4–16

December: 6–10 (home: 3–4; road: 3–6)

Game	Date	Team	Score	High points	High rebounds	High assists	Location Attendance	Record
21	December 1	@ Oklahoma City	W 114–110	Jae'Sean Tate (32)	Jae'Sean Tate (10)	Jae'Sean Tate (7)	Paycom Center; 13,222	5–16
22	December 3	Orlando	W 118–116	Eric Gordon (24)	Christian Wood (14)	Kevin Porter Jr. (6)	Toyota Center; 13,697	6–16
23	December 5	New Orleans	W 118–108	Gordon, Wood (23)	Christian Wood (8)	Jae'Sean Tate (7)	Toyota Center; 14,771	7–16
24	December 8	Brooklyn	W 114–104	Eric Gordon (21)	Christian Wood (15)	Jae'Sean Tate (5)	Toyota Center; 15,834	8–16
25	December 10	Milwaukee	L 114–123	Garrison Mathews (23)	Christian Wood (13)	Jae'Sean Tate (9)	Toyota Center; 16,319	8–17
26	December 11	@ Memphis	L 106–113	Christian Wood (22)	Christian Wood (11)	Brooks, Şengün (6)	FedExForum; 17,794	8–18
27	December 13	@ Atlanta	W 132–126	Eric Gordon (32)	Garrison Mathews (8)	Şengün, Tate (4)	State Farm Arena; 14,456	9–18
28	December 15	@ Cleveland	L 84–129	Alperen Şengün (19)	Alperen Şengün (11)	Alperen Şengün (5)	Rocket Mortgage FieldHouse; 17,131	9–19
29	December 16	New York	L 103–116	Daniel Theis (22)	Daniel Theis (10)	Eric Gordon (9)	Toyota Center; 13,857	9–20
30	December 18	@ Detroit	W 116–107	Christian Wood (21)	Kenyon Martin Jr. (11)	Josh Christopher (7)	Little Caesars Arena; 13,722	10–20
31	December 20	@ Chicago	L 118–133	Christian Wood (23)	Christian Wood (11)	Gordon, Tate (6)	United Center; 21,150	10–21
32	December 22	@ Milwaukee	L 106–126	Christian Wood (20)	Christian Wood (11)	Gordon, Martin Jr. (6)	Fiserv Forum; 17,341	10–22
33	December 23	@ Indiana	L 106–118	Christian Wood (22)	Şengün, Wood (8)	Eric Gordon (5)	Gainbridge Fieldhouse; 15,089	10–23
34	December 27	@ Charlotte	L 99–123	Trevelin Queen (17)	Christian Wood (9)	Armoni Brooks (4)	Spectrum Center; 19,349	10–24
35	December 28	L.A. Lakers	L 123–132	Jalen Green (24)	David Nwaba (7)	Kevin Porter Jr. (9)	Toyota Center; 18,104	10–25
36	December 31	Miami	L 110–120	Jae'Sean Tate (22)	David Nwaba (10)	Gordon, Porter Jr. (4)	Toyota Center; 16,197	10–26

January: 4–10 (home: 0–7; road: 4–3)

Game	Date	Team	Score	High points	High rebounds	High assists	Location Attendance	Record
37	January 1	Denver	L 111–124	Jalen Green (29)	Kenyon Martin Jr. (7)	Armoni Brooks (4)	Toyota Center; 18,055	10–27
38	January 3	@ Philadelphia	L 113–133	Garrison Mathews (23)	Daniel Theis (9)	Jae'Sean Tate (5)	Wells Fargo Center; 20,026	10–28
39	January 5	@ Washington	W 114–111	Green, Wood (22)	Christian Wood (11)	Kevin Porter Jr. (8)	Capital One Arena; 13,014	11–28
40	January 7	Dallas	L 106–130	Christian Wood (20)	Jae'Sean Tate (8)	Jae'Sean Tate (5)	Toyota Center; 15,238	11–29
41	January 9	Minnesota	L 123–141	Christian Wood (22)	Christian Wood (8)	Kevin Porter Jr. (8)	Toyota Center; 15,277	11–30
42	January 11	Philadelphia	L 91–111	Green, Wood (14)	Porter Jr., Wood (6)	Kevin Porter Jr. (5)	Toyota Center; 13,593	11–31
43	January 12	@ San Antonio	W 128–124	Eric Gordon (31)	Christian Wood (11)	Jae'Sean Tate (7)	AT&T Center; 11,314	12–31
44	January 14	@ Sacramento	L 114–126	Christian Wood (26)	Jae'Sean Tate (10)	Tate, Porter Jr. (8)	Golden 1 Center; 12,857	12–32
45	January 16	@ Sacramento	W 118–112	Porter Jr., Wood (23)	Christian Wood (14)	Kevin Porter Jr. (7)	Golden 1 Center; 13,601	13–32
46	January 19	@ Utah	W 116–111	Garrison Mathews (23)	Christian Wood (15)	Kevin Porter Jr. (8)	Vivint Arena; 18,306	14–32
47	January 21	@ Golden State	L 103–105	Christian Wood (19)	Christian Wood (15)	Kevin Porter Jr. (8)	Chase Center; 18,064	14–33
48	January 25	San Antonio	L 104–134	Kevin Porter Jr. (16)	Kenyon Martin Jr. (8)	Kevin Porter Jr. (9)	Toyota Center; 15,007	14–34
49	January 28	Portland	L 110–125	Mathews, Wood (21)	Christian Wood (15)	Green, Tate (5)	Toyota Center; 16,100	14–35
50	January 31	Golden State	L 108–122	Christian Wood (24)	Christian Wood (13)	Kevin Porter Jr. (11)	Toyota Center; 16,146	14–36

February: 1–9 (home: 1–3; road: 0–6)

Game	Date	Team	Score	High points	High rebounds	High assists	Location Attendance	Record
51	February 2	Cleveland	W 115–104	Green, Wood (21)	Alperen Sengun (8)	Kevin Porter Jr. (7)	Toyota Center; 14,163	15–36
52	February 4	@ San Antonio	L 106–131	Josh Christopher (23)	Christian Wood (11)	Josh Christopher (4)	AT&T Center; 15,344	15–37
53	February 6	New Orleans	L 107–120	Christian Wood (22)	Christian Wood (8)	Kevin Porter Jr. (8)	Toyota Center; 15,702	15–38
54	February 8	@ New Orleans	L 97–110	Kevin Porter Jr. (27)	Sengun, Wood, Tate (9)	Kevin Porter Jr. (5)	Smoothie King Center; 15,121	15–39
55	February 10	Toronto	L 120–139	Kevin Porter Jr. (30)	Christian Wood (11)	Kevin Porter Jr. (8)	Toyota Center; 16,129	15–40
56	February 14	@ Utah	L 101–135	Kenyon Martin Jr. (16)	Christian Wood (9)	Kevin Porter Jr. (8)	Vivint Arena; 18,306	15–41
57	February 16	@ Phoenix	L 121–124	Dennis Schroder (23)	Alperen Sengun (14)	Dennis Schroder (9)	Footprint Center; 17,071	15–42
58	February 17	@ L.A. Clippers	L 111–142	Jalen Green (21)	Christian Wood (7)	Dennis Schroder (9)	Staples Center; 17,519	15–43
59	February 25	@ Orlando	L 111–119	Jalen Green (23)	Christian Wood (11)	Tate, Schroder (6)	Amway Center; 16,631	15–44
60	February 27	L.A. Clippers	L 98–99	Garrison Mathews (17)	Dennis Schroder (8)	Dennis Schroder (10)	Toyota Center; 14,324	15–45

March: 5–12 (home: 3–8; road: 2–4)

Game	Date	Team	Score	High points	High rebounds	High assists	Location Attendance	Record
61	March 1	L.A. Clippers	L 100–113	Jalen Green (20)	Sengun, Tate (9)	Dennis Schroder (6)	Toyota Center; 12,949	15–46
62	March 2	Utah	L 127–132 (OT)	Jalen Green (27)	Christian Wood (10)	Kevin Porter Jr. (12)	Toyota Center; 13,583	15–47
63	March 4	@ Denver	L 101–116	Christian Wood (22)	Sengun, Wood (10)	Jalen Green (7)	Ball Arena; 16,254	15–48
64	March 6	Memphis	W 123–112	Kevin Porter Jr. (29)	Christian Wood (13)	Kevin Porter Jr. (5)	Toyota Center; 18,055	16–48
65	March 7	@ Miami	L 106–123	Kevin Porter Jr. (22)	Alperen Sengun (8)	Daishen Nix (4)	FTX Arena; 19,600	16–49
66	March 9	L.A. Lakers	W 139–130 (OT)	Jalen Green (32)	Alperen Sengun (14)	Kevin Porter Jr. (10)	Toyota Center; 18,055	17–49
67	March 11	Dallas	L 100–113	Christopher, Porter Jr. (17)	Bruno Fernando (11)	Dennis Schroder (7)	Toyota Center; 15,060	17–50
68	March 13	@ New Orleans	L 105–130	Jalen Green (17)	Christian Wood (12)	Nix, Porter Jr. (5)	Smoothie King Center; 15,683	17–51
69	March 16	Phoenix	L 112–129	Jalen Green (22)	Christian Wood (9)	Kevin Porter Jr. (8)	Toyota Center; 18,055	17–52
70	March 18	Indiana	L 118–121	Christian Wood (32)	Christian Wood (13)	Christian Wood (7)	Toyota Center; 13,748	17–53
71	March 20	Memphis	L 98–122	Dennis Schroder (17)	Alperen Şengün (9)	Josh Christopher (7)	Toyota Center; 18,055	17–54
72	March 21	Washington	W 115–97	Christian Wood (39)	Christian Wood (10)	Jae'Sean Tate (6)	Toyota Center; 13,936	18–54
73	March 23	@ Dallas	L 91–110	Alperen Şengün (14)	Alperen Şengün (11)	Kevin Porter Jr. (5)	American Airlines Center; 20,026	18–55
74	March 25	@ Portland	W 125–105	Jalen Green (23)	Christian Wood (11)	Kevin Porter Jr. (7)	Moda Center; 16,947	19–55
75	March 26	@ Portland	W 115–98	Alperen Şengün (27)	Alperen Şengün (7)	Kevin Porter Jr. (11)	Moda Center; 17,821	20–55
76	March 28	San Antonio	L 120–123	Jalen Green (30)	Kevin Porter Jr. (9)	Kevin Porter Jr. (7)	Toyota Center; 18,055	20–56
77	March 30	Sacramento	L 118–121	Jalen Green (32)	Kevin Porter Jr. (12)	Kevin Porter Jr. (12)	Toyota Center; 13,365	20–57

April: 0–5 (home: 0–3; road: 0–2)

Game	Date	Team	Score	High points	High rebounds	High assists	Location Attendance	Record
78	April 1	Sacramento	L 117–122	Jalen Green (33)	Usman Garuba (14)	Kevin Porter Jr. (11)	Toyota Center; 14,857	20–58
79	April 3	Minnesota	L 132–139	Jalen Green (31)	Alperen Sengun (15)	Kevin Porter Jr. (8)	Toyota Center; 16,539	20–59
80	April 5	@ Brooklyn	L 105–118	Kevin Porter Jr. (36)	Alperen Sengun (11)	Alperen Sengun (5)	Barclays Center; 17,768	20–60
81	April 8	@ Toronto	L 115–117	Kevin Porter Jr. (35)	Kevin Porter Jr. (10)	Christopher, Porter Jr. (4)	Scotiabank Arena; 19,800	20–61
82	April 10	Atlanta	L 114–130	Jalen Green (41)	Kevin Porter Jr. (8)	Alperen Sengun (8)	Toyota Center; 18,055	20–62

2021–22 season schedule

== Player statistics ==
Player	Pos.	GP	GS	MP	Reb.	Ast.	Stl.	Blk.	Pts.
D. J. Augustin^{‡}	PG	34	2	510	41	74	10	0	182
Armoni Brooks^{‡}	SG	41	8	690	81	49	21	8	254
Josh Christopher	SG	74	2	1,334	186	150	65	13	587
Bruno Fernando^{≠}	C	10	0	94	40	3	1	8	69
Usman Garuba	PF	24	2	239	83	17	10	11	48
Eric Gordon	SG	57	46	1,669	113	154	28	18	765
Jalen Green	SG	67	67	2,138	226	176	44	18	1,157
Danuel House^{‡}	SF	16	1	233	43	19	5	5	77
Kenyon Martin Jr.	SF	79	2	1,656	297	101	34	40	696
Garrison Mathews	SG	65	33	1,712	190	64	57	24	650
Daishen Nix	PG	24	0	261	33	40	15	0	77
David Nwaba	SF	46	4	609	151	35	28	20	233
Kevin Porter Jr.	PG	61	61	1,907	267	376	69	22	949
Trevelin Queen^{≠}	SG	10	0	74	16	4	5	1	43
Dennis Schröder^{≠}	PG	15	4	404	50	88	12	3	163
Alperen Şengün	C	72	13	1,489	393	185	59	68	692
Jae'Sean Tate	SF	78	77	2,056	420	222	72	41	919
Daniel Theis^{†}	C	26	21	584	130	20	11	17	218
Christian Wood	C	68	67	2,094	686	155	54	65	1,218

After all games.
^{‡}Waived during the season
^{†}Traded during the season
^{≠}Acquired during the season

== Transactions ==
=== Overview ===
Players Added

Via draft
- Jalen Green
- Usman Garuba
- Josh Christopher

Via trade

- Alperen Şengün
- Dennis Schröder
- Bruno Fernando

Via free agency

- Daishen Nix
Players Lost

Via trade
- Daniel Theis

Via free agency

- Avery Bradley
- Sterling Brown
- Kelly Olynyk
- D. J. Wilson

Waived

- Matthew Hurt
- Khyri Thomas
- Sekou Doumbouya
- Tyler Bey
- Danuel House
- D. J. Augustin
- Armoni Brooks

=== Trades ===
July 30, 2021
October 6, 2021
To Houston Rockets

Draft rights to Alperen Şengün
To Houston Rockets

Sekou Doumbouya

Unprotected 2024 second-round pick

To Oklahoma City Thunder

2022 DET protected first-round pick
2023 WAS protected first-round pick
To Brooklyn Nets

Cash considerations

=== Free agency ===
==== Re-signed ====
Date	Player	Signed	Ref.
August 9	David Nwaba	3 years, $15 million	
August 27	Armoni Brooks	4 years, $7.2 million	
September 6	Anthony Lamb	Two-way contract	
September 17	Danté Exum	3 years, $15 million	

==== Additions ====
Date	Player	Contract Terms	Former team	Ref.
August 7	Daniel Theis	4 years, $36 million	Chicago Bulls	
August 25	Daishen Nix	1 year, $925 thousand	NBA G League Ignite	

==== Subtractions ====
Date	Player	Reason left	New team	Ref.
August 1 (Note: August 1 was the deadline to pick up the team options of players. The Rockets did not pick up Bradley's team option.)	Avery Bradley	Unrestricted free agent	Golden State Warriors	
August 1 (Note: August 1 was the deadline to extend a qualifying offer to restricted free agents. The Rockets did not extend an offer to D.J. Wilson, making him an unrestricted free agent.)	D. J. Wilson	Unrestricted free agent	Oklahoma City Thunder	
August 6	Kelly Olynyk	Unrestricted free agent	Detroit Pistons	
August 10	Sterling Brown	Unrestricted free agent	Dallas Mavericks	
September 24	Matthew Hurt	Waived	Memphis Grizzlies	
October 6	Khyri Thomas	Waived	Bilbao Basket	
October 7	Sekou Doumbouya	Waived	Los Angeles Lakers	
October 14	Tyler Bey	Waived	Rio Grande Valley Vipers	
October 16	Dante Exum	Waived	FC Barcelona	
December 21	Danuel House	Waived	New York Knicks	
