= 2021–22 NBA G League season =

- League: NBA G League
- Sport: Basketball
- Duration: November 5, 2021 – April 2, 2022
- Number of teams: 30

Draft
- Top draft pick: Shamorie Ponds
- Picked by: Delaware Blue Coats

Regular season
- Top seed: Raptors 905; Rio Grande Valley Vipers
- Season MVP: Trevelin Queen (Rio Grande Valley Vipers)
- Finals champions: Rio Grande Valley Vipers
- Runners-up: Delaware Blue Coats
- Finals MVP: Trevelin Queen (Rio Grande Valley)

NBA G League seasons
- ← 2020–21 2022–23 →

The 2021–22 NBA G League season was the 21st season of the NBA G League, the official minor league basketball organization owned by the National Basketball Association (NBA). The prior season, the league played a shortened season with 18 teams and all games were held at ESPN Wide World of Sports Complex in Bay Lake, Florida, in similar to the 2020 NBA Bubble due to the ongoing restrictions during the COVID-19 pandemic. The 2021–22 season consisted of two phases: a Showcase Cup from November 5 to December 22, with all 30 teams participating before 28 of the league teams underwent a traditional regular season intended to span 36 games for each team from January 5 to April 2 before postseason. Untimely postponements, however, would lead to a varying level of games played before the end of the season, which meant roughly 31-35 games were played by each team.

== League changes ==
The NBA G League added one new team, had three teams relocate, and two teams rebrand for the 2021–22 season:

- The Capitanes de la Ciudad de México were initially planned to start playing in the G League for the 2020–21 season, but pushed back their debut in the G League to the 2021–22 season due to the pandemic. As the travel restrictions continued in the scheduling of the 2021–22 season, the Capitanes played during the Showcase Cup from November 5 to December 22 and were not able to play any home games in Mexico City.
- The Canton Charge relocated to Cleveland to play at Cleveland State University's Wolstein Center and were re-branded as the Cleveland Charge.
- The Detroit Pistons purchased and relocated the Northern Arizona Suns franchise to become the Motor City Cruise with home games in Detroit at Wayne State Fieldhouse.
- The New Orleans Pelicans relocated their franchise, previously playing as the Erie BayHawks, to Birmingham, Alabama, as the Birmingham Squadron following the renovation of Legacy Arena.
- The Boston Celtics rebranded their affiliate, the Maine Red Claws, as the Maine Celtics.
- The Denver Nuggets affiliated with the Grand Rapids Drive, which had previously been affiliated with the Pistons, and the Drive rebranded as the Grand Rapids Gold.
- Divisions were abolished in place of having the top six teams of each conference make the postseason (the last season with divisions was the 2019–20 NBA G League season, as the 2020–21 season had the top eight of the eighteen teams make the playoffs).

Additionally, the Westchester Knicks temporarily relocated their home games from White Plains, New York, to Bridgeport, Connecticut, as their home arena, the Westchester County Center, was still being used as a COVID-19 vaccination site. The Capitanes de la Ciudad de México also set up their season in Fort Worth, Texas as a temporary home for this season in order to play in the G League this season without circumventing border restrictions at the time.

The league changed its season format to be played in two stages: a 14-game Showcase Cup and then an intended 36-game regular season with a playoff. All 30 teams played in the Showcase Cup that ended with the NBA G League Winter Showcase on the weekend of December 19 to 22. The regular season was then set to start on December 27, but was then pushed back to January 5. The league standings reset for the start of the regular season for qualifying for the playoffs. The NBA G League Ignite and Capitanes de la Ciudad de México will not participate in the regular season or playoffs, but will play a few exhibition games that do not count towards the other teams standings.

=== Other changes ===
This season is the first for Wilson as the G League's official ball brand. On May 14, 2020, the NBA announced a multi-year partnership with Wilson as the manufacturer and supplier of G League game balls, to succeed Spalding, which supplied the league since 2001 as the National Basketball Development League (NBDL).

== Winter Showcase ==
=== Standings ===
==== Central ====
Pos	Team	W	L	PCT	GB
1	x – Wisconsin Herd (MIL)	9	3	.750	—
2	x – Motor City Cruise (DET)	8	4	.667	1
3	x – Fort Wayne Mad Ants (IND)	8	4	.667	1
4	Cleveland Charge (CLE)	6	6	.500	3
5	Iowa Wolves (MIN)	6	6	.500	3
6	Grand Rapids Gold (DEN)	5	6	.455	3.5
7	Windy City Bulls (CHI)	2	7	.222	5.5
8	Sioux Falls Skyforce (MIA)	1	9	.100	7

Source: GLeague.NBA.com
x – Qualified for Showcase Cup

==== East ====
Pos	Team	W	L	PCT	GB
1	y – Delaware Blue Coats (PHI)	11	1	.917	—
2	x – Maine Celtics (BOS)	10	2	.833	1
3	Capital City Go-Go (WAS)	6	6	.500	5
4	Westchester Knicks (NYK)	4	8	.333	7
5	Long Island Nets (BKN)	4	8	.333	7
6	Raptors 905 (TOR)	4	8	.333	7
7	College Park Skyhawks (ATL)	3	9	.250	8

Source: GLeague.NBA.com
x – Qualified for Showcase Cup; y – Clinched top seed in Showcase Cup

==== South ====
Pos	Team	W	L	PCT	GB
1	x – Rio Grande Valley Vipers (HOU)	9	3	.750	—
2	Birmingham Squadron (NO)	7	5	.583	2
3	Texas Legends (DAL)	7	5	.583	2
4	Austin Spurs (SAS)	7	5	.583	2
5	Memphis Hustle (MEM)	6	6	.500	3
6	Lakeland Magic (ORL)	5	7	.417	4
7	Capitanes de la Ciudad de México	4	8	.333	5
8	Greensboro Swarm (CHA)	3	9	.250	6

Source: GLeague.NBA.com
x – Qualified for Showcase Cup

==== West ====
Pos	Team	W	L	PCT	GB
1	x – South Bay Lakers (LAL)	9	3	.750	—
2	x – Oklahoma City Blue (OKC)	8	4	.667	1
3	Agua Caliente Clippers (LAC)	7	5	.583	2
4	NBA G League Ignite	6	6	.500	3
5	Stockton Kings (SAC)	6	6	.500	3
6	Santa Cruz Warriors (GSW)	4	8	.333	5
7	Salt Lake City Stars (UTA)	2	10	.167	7

Source: GLeague.NBA.com
x – Qualified for Showcase Cup

=== Showcase Cup ===
Final Results:

Quarterfinals; Dec. 19
1	Delaware Blue Coats	126
8	Fort Wayne Mad Ants	101
4	South Bay Lakers	119
5	Wisconsin Herd	112
3	Rio Grande Valley Vipers	113
6	Oklahoma City Blue	119 (OT)
2	Maine Celtics	103
7	Motor City Cruise	116

Semifinals; Dec. 21
1	Delaware Blue Coats	122
4	South Bay Lakers	108
6	Oklahoma City Blue	99
7	Motor City Cruise	97

Showcase Cup Championship; Dec. 22
1	Delaware Blue Coats	104
6	Oklahoma City Blue	96

=== Statistics ===
Category	Player	Team(s)	Statistic
Points per game	Saben Lee	Motor City Cruise	30.9
Rebounds per game	Freddie Gillespie	Memphis Hustle	12.5
Assists per game	Ryan Arcidiacono	Maine Celtics	7.8
Steals per game	Shaquille Harrison	Delaware Blue Coats	3.3
Blocks per game	Freddie Gillespie	Memphis Hustle	2.8
Turnovers per game	Vernon Carey Jr.	Greensboro Swarm	4.5
Minutes per game	Tyler Hall	Westchester Knicks	39.8
Efficiency per game	Nathan Knight	Iowa Wolves	36.6
Double-doubles	Terry Taylor	Fort Wayne Mad Ants	11

== Regular season ==
As of April 2, 2022.

=== Eastern Conference ===
Pos	Team	W	L	PCT	GB
1	y – Raptors 905 (TOR)	24	8	.750	—
2	x – Motor City Cruise (DET)	22	10	.688	2
3	x – Delaware Blue Coats (PHI)	22	10	.688	2
4	x – Capital City Go-Go (WAS)	21	10	.677	2.5
5	x – College Park Skyhawks (ATL)	20	13	.606	4.5
6	x – Long Island Nets (BKN)	18	15	.545	6.5
7	e – Grand Rapids Gold (DEN)	17	15	.531	7
8	e – Westchester Knicks (NYK)	17	15	.531	7
9	e – Fort Wayne Mad Ants (IND)	17	17	.500	8
10	e – Maine Celtics (BOS)	16	16	.500	8
11	e – Windy City Bulls (CHI)	15	19	.441	10
12	e – Lakeland Magic (ORL)	11	21	.344	13
13	e – Greensboro Swarm (CHA)	9	24	.273	15.5
14	e – Wisconsin Herd (MIL)	8	24	.250	16
15	e – Cleveland Charge (CLE)	6	26	.188	18

Source: GLeague.NBA.com
e – Eliminated; x – Qualified for playoffs; y – Clinched top seed

=== Western Conference ===
Pos	Team	W	L	PCT	GB
1	y – Rio Grande Valley Vipers (HOU)	24	10	.706	—
2	x – Agua Caliente Clippers (LAC)	22	11	.667	1.5
3	x – South Bay Lakers (LAL)	21	11	.656	2
4	x – Birmingham Squadron (NO)	18	14	.563	5
5	x – Texas Legends (DAL)	19	15	.559	5
6	x – Santa Cruz Warriors (GSW)	15	17	.469	8
7	e – Iowa Wolves (MIN)	15	17	.469	8
8	e – Stockton Kings (SAC)	15	18	.455	8.5
9	e – Memphis Hustle (MEM)	15	19	.441	9
10	e – Oklahoma City Blue (OKC)	15	20	.429	9.5
11	e – Austin Spurs (SAS)	13	19	.406	10
12	e – Sioux Falls Skyforce (MIA)	14	21	.400	10.5
13	e – Salt Lake City Stars (UTA)	9	23	.281	14

Source: GLeague.NBA.com
e – Eliminated; x – Qualified for playoffs; y – Clinched top seed

== Playoffs ==
- Quarterfinals: April 5 (one game)
- Semifinals: April 7/8 (one game)
- Conference Finals: April 9 & 10 (one game)
- Finals: April 12 & April 14 (best-of-three)

For the fifth time in the best-of-three series era and for the first time since 2018, a team went undefeated in postseason play, as the Rio Grande Valley Vipers went 4–0 to win their fourth league title, defeating the Delaware Blue Coats in two games. The Vipers set a couple of records during the G League Finals, most notably in Game 1 when they scored 145 points in a 145–128 victory, which was the most points scored by a team in G League Finals history. Trevelin Queen scored 44 points, the second most scored in a Final; two triple-doubles were recorded by the Vipers: Daishen Nix scored 31 points, 12 rebounds, and 11 assists and Anthony Lamb scored 10 points, 10 rebounds, and 10 assists. This was the first time a triple-double had been recorded in the League since 2013 and it was the first Finals game to feature two triple-doubles in the same game. Mfiondu Kabengele recorded eight blocks, a Finals record. The Blue Coats became the first team since the Santa Cruz Warriors (2013, 2014) to lose back-to-back G League Finals.

Conference Quarterfinals	Conference Semifinals
1	Raptors 905	131*
4	Capital City Go-Go	126
4	Capital City Go-Go	131
5	College Park Skyhawks	122
Eastern Conference
2	Motor City Cruise	116
3	Delaware Blue Coats	124
3	Delaware Blue Coats	133
6	Long Island Nets	116
1	Rio Grande Valley Vipers	120
5	Texas Legends	103
4	Birmingham Squadron	100
5	Texas Legends	115
Western Conference
2	Agua Caliente Clippers	112
3	South Bay Lakers	110
3	South Bay Lakers	134
6	Santa Cruz Warriors	123

Conference Finals
1	Raptors 905	139
3	Delaware Blue Coats	143
1	Rio Grande Valley Vipers	125
2	Agua Caliente Clippers	114

Finals; Best-of-three
3	Delaware Blue Coats	128	114
1	Rio Grande Valley Vipers	145	131

=== Finals boxscore ===
April 12, 2022
9:00 p.m. ET

Play-by-Play
Boxscore

Delaware Blue Coats 128, Rio Grande Valley Vipers 145
Scoring by quarter: 36–35, 29–42, 32–36, 31–32
Pts: Patrick McCaw 24; Rebs: Patrick McCaw 9 Asts: Shamorie Ponds 9	Pts: Trevelin Queen 44; Rebs: Mfiondu Kabengele 14; Asts: Daishen Nix 11

Bert Ogden Arena, Edinburg, Texas
Attendance: 4,186
Referees:
- #12 Robert Hussey
- #55 Cheryl Flores
- #36 Tyler Ricks
- #77 Jenna Reneau

April 14, 2022
8:00 p.m. ET

Recap
Boxscore

Rio Grande Valley Vipers 131, Delaware Blue Coats 114
Scoring by quarter: 43–28, 26–29, 35–29, 27–28
Pts: Mfiondu Kabengele 29; Rebs: Daishen Nix 11; Asts: Daishen Nix 8	Pts: Myles Powell 28; Rebs: Shaquille Harrison 12; Asts: Shaquille Harrison 9
Rio Grande Valley wins series, 2–0

Chase Fieldhouse, Wilmington, Delaware
Attendance: 2,619
Referees:
- #17 Matt Kallio
- #13 Dannica Mosher
- #80 Jamahl Ralls
- #18 Isaac Barnett

== Statistics ==
Category	Player	Team(s)	Statistic
Points per game	Carsen Edwards	Salt Lake City Stars	26.7
Rebounds per game	Petr Cornelie	Grand Rapids Gold	13.0
Assists per game	Derrick Walton	Motor City Cruise	9.5
Steals per game	Gabe York	Fort Wayne Mad Ants	3.3
Blocks per game	Tacko Fall	Cleveland Charge	2.7
Turnovers per game	Craig Randall	Long Island Nets	4.5
Minutes per game	Craig Randall	Long Island Nets	40.8
FG%	Tacko Fall	Cleveland Charge	76.6%
FT%	Joe Chealey	Greensboro Swarm	92.2%
3FG%	Micah Potter	Sioux Falls Skyforce	44.1%
Efficiency per game	Justin Tillman	College Park Skyhawks	29.1

== Awards ==
=== Player of the Week ===
Date	Player
November 9–16	Saben Lee
November 16–23	Charlie Brown Jr.
November 23–30	Tacko Fall
November 30–December 7	Luka Šamanić
December 7–14	Paul Reed
January 4–11	Craig Randall II
January 11–18	Carlik Jones
January 18–25	Daishen Nix
January 25–February 1	Justin Tillman
February 1–8	Saben Lee
February 8–15	Chris Clemons
February 22–March 1	Isaiah Thomas
March 1–March 8	Nik Stauskas
March 8–March 15	Justin Anderson
March 15–March 22	Cat Barber
March 22–March 29	Jerome Robinson
March 29–April 5	Charles Bassey

=== Player of the Month ===
Date	Player
November	Saben Lee
January	Mason Jones
February	Craig Randall II
March	Chris Clemons

=== Winter Showcase ===
==== Most Valuable Player ====
- Jarron Cumberland, Delaware Blue Coats

==== All-Showcase Team ====
- F, Paris Bass, South Bay Lakers
- F, D. J. Wilson, Oklahoma City Blue
- F/C, Cheick Diallo, Motor City Cruise
- G, Jarron Cumberland, Delaware Blue Coats
- G, Cat Barber, College Park Skyhawks

== Notable occurrences ==
- On December 26, 2021, Deividas Sirvydis of the Motor City Cruise received a call-up by the Detroit Pistons, making him the 64th player to be called up that season and breaking the record of 63 call-ups in the 2014–15 season.
