= Kenyon =

Kenyon may refer to:

== Names ==
- Kenyon (given name)
- Kenyon (surname)

== Places ==
- Kenyon, Cheshire, United Kingdom, a village
- Kenyon, Minnesota, United States, a city
- Kenyon, Rhode Island, United States, a village
- Kenyon, former name of Pineridge, California, United States
- Kenyon Peaks, Antarctica
- Mount Kenyon, Antarctica

== Other uses ==
- Kenyon Medal, awarded in recognition of work in the field of classical studies and archaeology
- Baron Kenyon, a title in the Peerage of Great Britain
- Kenyon & Kenyon, American law firm specializing in intellectual property
- Kenyon College, a private liberal arts college in Gambier, Ohio
- Kenyon Bridge, a historic covered bridge in Cornish, New Hampshire
- the title character of Daisy Kenyon, 1947 film starring Joan Crawford and Henry Fonda

== See also ==
- The Kenyon Review, American literary journal
- Kinyon (disambiguation)
- Kenyan
