= Kenyon (given name) =

Kenyon is a masculine given name, which may refer to:

- Kenyon Coleman (born 1979), American former National Football League player
- Kenyon Cox (1856–1919), American painter, illustrator, muralist, writer and teacher
- Kenyon Clutter, murdered in 1959, written about in Truman Capote's novel In Cold Blood
- Kenyon Green (born 2001), American football player
- Kenyon Hopkins (1912–1983), American film composer
- Kenyon Martin (born 1977), National Basketball Association player
- Kenyon Martin Jr. (born 2001), American basketball player and son of Kenyon
- Kenyon Nicholson (1894–1986), American playwright and screenwriter
- Kenyon Painter (1867–1940), American banker, big game hunter, art collector and philanthropist
- Kenyon Peard (1902–1994), British Royal Navy rear-admiral
- Kenyon Rasheed (born 1970), American former National Football League player
- Kenyon Sadiq (born 2005), American football player
- Kenyon Vaughan-Morgan (1873–1933), British lieutenant-colonel and politician
