= Stephen Silas =

American basketball coach (born 1973)

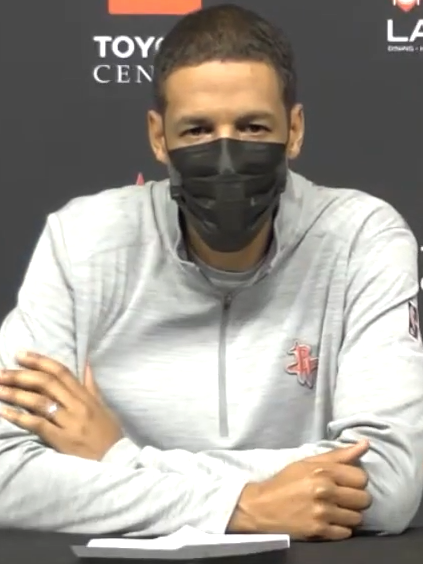
- Silas as head coach of the Houston Rockets in 2021

Toronto Raptors
- Title: Assistant coach
- League: NBA

Personal information
- Born: August 6, 1973 (age 53) Boston, Massachusetts, U.S.
- Listed height: 6 ft 4 in (1.93 m)

Career information
- High school: John Jay (Cross River, New York); St. Thomas More (Oakdale, Connecticut)
- College: Brown (1992–1996)
- Position: Guard
- Coaching career: 2000–present

Career history

Coaching
- 2000–2002: Charlotte Hornets (assistant)
- 2002–2003: New Orleans Hornets (assistant)
- 2003–2005: Cleveland Cavaliers (assistant)
- 2006–2010: Golden State Warriors (assistant)
- 2010–2018: Charlotte Bobcats/Hornets (assistant)
- 2018–2020: Dallas Mavericks (assistant)
- 2020–2023: Houston Rockets
- 2023–2024: Detroit Pistons (assistant)
- 2026—present: Toronto Raptors (assistant)
Medals
Men's basketball
Head coach for United States
FIBA AmeriCup
Bronze medal – third place	2025 Nicaragua

Stephen Silas (born August 6, 1973) is an American basketball coach who is an assistant coach of the Toronto Raptors of the National Basketball Association (NBA). He is the son of NBA star player and head coach Paul Silas.

He worked under his father at the Charlotte Hornets from 2000 to 2002, New Orleans Hornets from 2002 to 2003, and the Cleveland Cavaliers from 2003 to 2005. He also served as an advance scout for the Washington Wizards during the 2005–06 season, and as an assistant coach for the Golden State Warriors from 2006 to 2010, before leaving to rejoin his father in Charlotte where he worked from 2010 until 2018. He was head coach of the Rockets from 2020 to 2023.

At the time of his hiring as an assistant with the Hornets on June 5, 2000, he was the youngest assistant in the NBA at the age of 26.

== Early career ==
Silas was born in Boston, and grew up in Boston and New York City. He attended John Jay High School in Cross River, New York, while his father served as an assistant coach for the New York Knicks. He played a postgraduate year of basketball at St. Thomas More School in Oakdale, Connecticut. Silas graduated from Brown University in 1996 with bachelor's degrees in sociology and management. While studying, he played four seasons for the university's basketball team. After graduation and before joining the NBA, Silas spent three years as the assistant executive director of the National Basketball Retired Players Association (NBRPA) in Providence, Rhode Island.

== Coaching career ==
=== Charlotte/New Orleans Hornets (2000–2002) ===
Silas also spent three seasons as an assistant coach with the Charlotte Hornets while his father, Paul Silas, was coaching the team. Silas originally joined the Hornets in the summer of 1999 as an advance and college scout, scouting nearly 200 NBA and college games in that role. He also served as the head coach for the Hornets Summer League squad at the 2002 Orlando Summer Pro League.

=== Cleveland Cavaliers (2003–2005) ===
Silas spent five seasons on the coaching staffs of his father with the Cleveland Cavaliers and both Hornets' franchises. He served as an assistant coach for the Cavaliers from 2003 to 2005, where he worked closely with LeBron James and was responsible for individual skill work, player development, game preparation, pre-game walkthroughs as well as the management and development of the technology and NBA scouting systems for the coaching staff. Silas also served as head coach for the Cavaliers 2003 Summer League teams in Boston and Orlando.

=== Golden State Warriors (2006–2010) ===
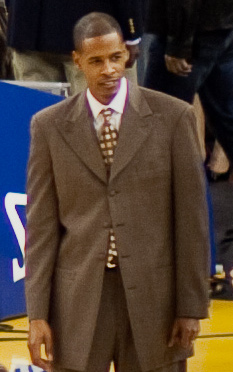
Silas as an assistant coach with the Warriors in 2010

Prior to joining the Warriors, Silas served as an advance scout for the Washington Wizards during the 2005–06 season. Silas spent more than five years coaching with the Golden State Warriors. He did not only work with his father, but also worked for legendary Hall of Fame coach Don Nelson. With the Warriors, Silas concentrated on the development of perimeter players as well as game preparation and managing the team's offensive and defensive playbook. One of these perimeter players included future two-time MVP Stephen Curry. He also served as the head coach for the Warriors' Summer League entry in Las Vegas.

=== Charlotte Bobcats/Hornets (2010–2018) ===
In December 2010, he joined the Charlotte Bobcats after his father became interim head coach of the team. During the 2011–12 season, on several occasions Silas served as the head coach for the Charlotte Bobcats.

Silas assisted the Hornets to the playoffs in the 2013–14 and 2015–16 seasons and during the 2013–14 season, the Hornets finished with the second highest number of single season wins in franchise history (43). At the end of the 2015–16 season, Silas emerged as a leading candidate to fill the head coaching position for the Houston Rockets, although Mike D'Antoni ended up getting the job.

On December 4, 2017, Silas filled in as head coach of the Hornets when Steve Clifford became ill, and continued to do so until Clifford returned on January 16, 2018.

=== Dallas Mavericks (2018–2020) ===
On May 24, 2018, Silas joined the Dallas Mavericks as an assistant coach under championship head coach Rick Carlisle.

=== Houston Rockets (2020–2023) ===
On October 30, 2020, Silas was named the head coach for the Houston Rockets, this marked Silas first time getting the job of a head coach. At the time, the team had Russell Westbrook and James Harden on the roster, and it was a very exciting position for Silas to take. However, Westbrook got traded to the Washington Wizards on December 2, 2020, after requesting a trade. Just a month later, the team traded Harden to the Brooklyn Nets. Silas and the Rockets started out the 2020–21 season with a 11–10 record, but when Rockets forward Christian Wood injured his right knee in a win against the Memphis Grizzlies on February 4, 2021, Silas and his Rockets started to struggle, going on a 20-game losing streak. Unfortunately for Silas and the Rockets, in his first season, they had to play a league-record 30 players due to various injuries and trades, even playing with only seven or eight players for some games near the end of the season, and they finished with a league-worst 17–55 record. In the following 2021–22 season, Silas and the Rockets were once again at the bottom of the Western Conference, finishing with a 20–62 record. In the 2022–23 season, the Rockets finished with a 22–60 record, second-worst in the Western Conference. On April 10, 2023, it was announced that the Rockets released Silas after they chose not to pick up his fourth year option. Silas finished his tenure as the Rockets coach with a 59–177 record (.250). The stretch he coached the team was the worst three-season stretch in franchise history. Silas also holds the worst coaching record in NBA history among those to coach at least 200 NBA games. However, this is not surprising, as the owner of the Houston Rockets, Tilman Fertitta, revealed that the team intentionally 'tanked' (attempted to finish in the bottom of the standings) for those 3 seasons in order to acquire higher-quality draft picks while the team was able to rebuild in that manner.

=== Detroit Pistons (2023–2024) ===
On June 5, 2023, Silas accepted the role of top assistant coach for the Detroit Pistons, working alongside the recently appointed head coach, Monty Williams.

=== Toronto Raptors (2026–present) ===
On July 9, 2026, the Toronto Raptors hired Silas to serve as an assistant coach under head coach Darko Rajaković.

== International coaching ==
Internationally, Silas has worked at many camps and clinics across the globe to help promote the game of basketball and the NBA. Recently, he served as coach at the Korea Development Camp in Seoul, working in conjunction with the NBA and Korean Basketball League. In 2008, he served as a coach at the NBA's Basketball Without Borders camp in Africa, as well as in Beijing during the summer of 2005. And in 2004, he represented the NBA Coaches Association at the Dirk Nowitzki Basketball Academy in Berlin, Germany. In October 2024, it was announced that Stephen Silas would serve as head coach of Team USA for the final two windows of FIBA AmeriCup Qualifiers.

== Head coaching record ==
Legend
Regular season	G	Games coached	W	Games won	L	Games lost	W–L %	Win–loss %
Playoffs	PG	Playoff games	PW	Playoff wins	PL	Playoff losses	PW–L %	Playoff win–loss %

Team	Year	G	W	L	W–L%	Finish	PG	PW	PL	PW–L%	Result
Houston	2020–21	72	17	55	.236	5th in Southwest	—	—	—	—	Missed playoffs
Houston	2021–22	82	20	62	.244	5th in Southwest	—	—	—	—	Missed playoffs
Houston	2022–23	82	22	60	.268	4th in Southwest	—	—	—	—	Missed playoffs
Career		236	59	177	.250		—	—	—	—	

== Personal life ==
Silas and his wife have two children.
