= Kenyon (surname) =

Kenyon is a surname of English origin. The name first appears in English heraldry, the first known holder being Jordan Kenyon, Lord of Winwick, Cheshire. Notable people with the surname include:

- Alfred Stephen Kenyon (1867–1943), Australian civil engineer and polymath
- Arthur Kenyon (footballer) (1867–1895), English footballer
- Basil Kenyon (1918–1996), South African rugby union player
- Carol Kenyon (born 1959), British singer
- Cecelia Kenyon (1923–1990), American political scientist
- Cynthia Kenyon (born 1954), American molecular biologist
- Dean H. Kenyon (born c. 1939), American biologist and proponent of intelligent design
- Don Kenyon (1924–1996), English cricketer
- Doris Kenyon (1897–1979), American actress and singer
- Dorothy Kenyon (1888–1972), American lawyer
- E. W. Kenyon (1867–1948), American evangelist and president of a Bible Institute
- Elmer A. Kenyon (1870–1922), American politician
- Frederic G. Kenyon (1863–1952) British paleographer and biblical scholar
- Frederick C. Kenyon (1867–1941), American zoologist and anatomist
- James Kenyon (cinematographer) (1850–1925), English pioneer of cinematography
- James Kenyon (politician) (1846–1924), British Member of Parliament
- James Kenyon (sport shooter) (1875–1935), Canadian Olympic sport shooter
- Jane Kenyon (1947–1995), American poet and translator
- John Kenyon (priest) (1812–1869), Irish Catholic priest and Young Irelander
- John Robert Kenyon (1807–1880), British legal academic
- John Samuel Kenyon (1874–1959), American phonetician
- Kathleen Kenyon (1906–1978), British archaeologist of Neolithic culture
- Ley Kenyon (1913–1990), commercial artist, prisoner of war (The Great Escape)
- Kyle Kenyon (1924–1996), American politician
- Lloyd Kenyon, 1st Baron Kenyon (1732–1802), British politician and barrister
- Lloyd Kenyon, 3rd Baron Kenyon (1805–1869), British Member of Parliament
- Matt Kenyon (born 1977), American new media artist
- Matt Kenyon (basketball) (born 1998), Australian basketball player
- Mel Kenyon (born 1933), American racing driver
- Nicholas Kenyon (born 1951), English music administrator
- Peter Kenyon (born 1954), British chief executive of Chelsea Football Club
- Sandy Kenyon (1922–2010), American actor
- Sara Kenyon British midwife and professor of evidence-based maternity care
- Sherrilyn Kenyon (born 1965), American writer of pulp fiction novels
- Steve Kenyon (born 1951), English long-distance runner
- Tom Kenyon (born 1972), Australian politician
- William C. Kenyon (1898–1951), American athlete and coach
- William S. Kenyon (Iowa politician) (1869–1933), American senator
- William S. Kenyon (New York politician) (1820–1896), U.S. representative from New York

== See also ==
- Herbert Hollick-Kenyon (1897–1975), British aircraft pilot in Antarctica
- William Kenyon-Slaney (1847–1908), English sportsman, soldier and political
