= Wenyon =

Wenyon is a surname. Notable people with the surname include:

- Herbert Wenyon (1888–1944), English cricket player
- Charles Morley Wenyon (1878–1948), English protozoologist

== See also ==
- Kenyon
- Wenyon & Gamble, the name used by the art team of Susan Gamble and Michael Wenyon
