= 2020–21 Houston Rockets season =

NBA professional basketball team season

- Head coach: Stephen Silas
- General manager: Rafael Stone
- Owner: Tilman Fertitta
- Arena: Toyota Center

Results
- Record: 17–55 (.236)
- Place: Division: 5th (Southwest); Conference: 15th (Western)
- Playoff finish: Did not qualify
- Stats at Basketball Reference

Local media
- Television: AT&T SportsNet Southwest
- Radio: Sportstalk 790

The 2020–21 Houston Rockets season was the 54th season of the franchise in the National Basketball Association (NBA), their 50th anniversary season in the Houston area in Texas since the team franchise relocated from the San Diego area in California and their 4th season under owner Tilman Fertitta.

On September 13, Mike D'Antoni informed the Rockets that he would not return as head coach after coaching the team for four seasons. On October 30, the Rockets hired Stephen Silas as their new head coach. On October 15, Daryl Morey resigned from his position as general manager after thirteen years and Rafael Stone was named as his replacement. For the first time since 2011–12, James Harden was not on the roster as he was traded to the Brooklyn Nets in a four-team deal; this reunited him with former Oklahoma City Thunder teammate Kevin Durant for the first time since the 2011–12 season.

Without Harden along with Russell Westbrook, who was traded to the Washington Wizards for John Wall during the offseason and the majority of their players lost from last season's team, the Rockets entered a rebuilding period. They got off to an 11–10 start as of February 4, 2021, but their season was marked with an franchise–worst 20–game losing streak between early–February through mid–March, which tied for the ninth longest losing streak in NBA history and the longest since the record–setting 28–game losing streak from the Philadelphia 76ers between the late 2014–15 season and the early 2015–16 season.

By April 22, the Rockets were officially eliminated from playoff contention for the first time since the 2011–12 lockout season. This ended the NBA's longest active playoff streak at eight straight years. The Rockets finished the season at the bottom of the league with a record of 17–55, the third–worst season record in franchise history and their worst season since the dreadful 14–68 record from the 1982–83 season. This season also marked the first time since the 34–48 record from the 2005–06 season that they have suffered a losing record, ending a streak of 15 straight years of finishing a season .500 or above. As a result, the Boston Celtics now hold the league's longest active playoff streak, making the playoffs every year since 2015.

== Draft ==
The Rockets did not hold any picks for the 2020 NBA draft. This was the fourth time in franchise history that they did not hold any picks in the draft; the last time was in 2019.

== Roster ==
2020–21 Houston Rockets roster
Players

Pos.	No.	Player	Height	Weight	DOB	From
G	14	D. J. Augustin	5 ft 11 in (1.80 m)	183 lb (83 kg)	1987-11-10	Texas
G	9	Avery Bradley	6 ft 3 in (1.91 m)	180 lb (82 kg)	1990-11-26	Texas
G	7	Armoni Brooks (TW)	6 ft 3 in (1.91 m)	195 lb (88 kg)	1998-06-05	Houston
G/F	0	Sterling Brown	6 ft 5 in (1.96 m)	219 lb (99 kg)	1995-02-10	SMU
G	5	Dante Exum (injured)	6 ft 5 in (1.96 m)	214 lb (97 kg)	1995-07-13	Australia
G	10	Eric Gordon (injured)	6 ft 3 in (1.91 m)	215 lb (98 kg)	1988-12-25	Indiana
G/F	4	Danuel House	6 ft 6 in (1.98 m)	220 lb (100 kg)	1993-06-07	Texas A&M
F	33	Anthony Lamb (TW)	6 ft 6 in (1.98 m)	227 lb (103 kg)	1998-01-20	Vermont
F	6	Kenyon Martin	6 ft 6 in (1.98 m)	215 lb (98 kg)	2001-01-06	IMG Academy (FL)
G/F	2	David Nwaba (injured)	6 ft 5 in (1.96 m)	219 lb (99 kg)	1993-01-14	Cal Poly
F/C	41	Kelly Olynyk	6 ft 11 in (2.11 m)	240 lb (109 kg)	1991-04-19	Gonzaga
G/F	3	Kevin Porter	6 ft 4 in (1.93 m)	203 lb (92 kg)	2000-05-04	USC
F	8	Jae'Sean Tate	6 ft 4 in (1.93 m)	230 lb (104 kg)	1995-10-28	Ohio State
G	20	Khyri Thomas	6 ft 3 in (1.91 m)	210 lb (95 kg)	1996-05-08	Creighton
G	1	John Wall (injured)	6 ft 3 in (1.91 m)	210 lb (95 kg)	1990-09-06	Kentucky
F	00	D. J. Wilson	6 ft 10 in (2.08 m)	231 lb (105 kg)	1996-02-19	Michigan
C	35	Christian Wood	6 ft 10 in (2.08 m)	214 lb (97 kg)	1995-09-27	UNLV

Coaches
Head coach
- Stephen Silas
Assistant(s)
- DeSagana Diop
- Rick Higgins
- Jeff Hornacek
- John Lucas
- Will Weaver

Legend
- (DP) Unsigned draft pick
- (FA) Free agent
- (S) Suspended
- (GL) On assignment to G League affiliate
- (TW) Two-way affiliate player
- Injured

Roster
Updated: May 19, 2021

== Standings ==
=== Division ===
Southwest Division	W	L	PCT	GB	Home	Road	Div	GP
y – Dallas Mavericks	42	30	.583	–	21‍–‍15	21‍–‍15	7–5	72
x – Memphis Grizzlies	38	34	.528	4.0	18‍–‍18	20‍–‍16	6–6	72
pi – San Antonio Spurs	33	39	.458	9.0	14‍–‍22	19‍–‍17	6–6	72
New Orleans Pelicans	31	41	.431	11.0	18‍–‍18	13‍–‍23	6–6	72
Houston Rockets	17	55	.236	25.0	9‍–‍27	8‍–‍28	5–7	72

=== Conference ===
Western Conference
#	Team	W	L	PCT	GB	GP
1	z – Utah Jazz *	52	20	.722	–	72
2	y – Phoenix Suns *	51	21	.708	1.0	72
3	x – Denver Nuggets	47	25	.653	5.0	72
4	x – Los Angeles Clippers	47	25	.653	5.0	72
5	y – Dallas Mavericks *	42	30	.583	10.0	72
6	x – Portland Trail Blazers	42	30	.583	10.0	72
7	x – Los Angeles Lakers	42	30	.583	10.0	72
8	pi – Golden State Warriors	39	33	.542	13.0	72
9	x – Memphis Grizzlies	38	34	.528	14.0	72
10	pi – San Antonio Spurs	33	39	.458	19.0	72
11	New Orleans Pelicans	31	41	.431	21.0	72
12	Sacramento Kings	31	41	.431	21.0	72
13	Minnesota Timberwolves	23	49	.319	29.0	72
14	Oklahoma City Thunder	22	50	.306	30.0	72
15	Houston Rockets	17	55	.236	35.0	72

Notes

- z – Clinched home court advantage for the entire playoffs
- y – Clinched division title
- x – Clinched playoff spot
- * – Division leader

== Game log ==
=== Preseason ===
2020 preseason game log
Total: 3–1 (Home: 2–0; Road: 1–1)
Preseason: 3–1 (home: 2–0; road: 1–1)

Game	Date	Team	Score	High points	High rebounds	High assists	Location Attendance	Record
1	December 11	@ Chicago	W 125–104	Bruno Caboclo (17)	Bruno Caboclo (7)	John Wall (9)	United Center	1–0
2	December 13	@ Chicago	L 91–104	John Wall (21)	DeMarcus Cousins (6)	John Wall (4)	United Center	1–1
3	December 15	San Antonio	W 112–98	John Wall (15)	DeMarcus Cousins (11)	James Harden (4)	Toyota Center	2–1
4	December 17	San Antonio	W 128–106	Christian Wood (27)	Christian Wood (10)	James Harden (9)	Toyota Center	3–1

2020–21 season schedule

=== Regular season ===
2020–21 game log
Total: 17–55 (Home: 9–27; Road: 8–28)
December: 1–2 (home: 1–0; road: 0–2)

Game	Date	Team	Score	High points	High rebounds	High assists	Location Attendance	Record
–	December 23	Oklahoma City	Postponed (COVID-19) (Makeup date: March 21)					
1	December 26	@ Portland	L 126–128 (OT)	James Harden (44)	Christian Wood (13)	James Harden (17)	Moda Center; 0	0–1
2	December 28	@ Denver	L 111–124	James Harden (34)	Jae'Sean Tate (7)	James Harden (8)	Ball Arena; 0	0–2
3	December 31	Sacramento	W 122–119	James Harden (33)	Christian Wood (12)	John Wall (9)	Toyota Center; 0	1–2

January: 8–7 (home: 3–4; road: 5–3)

Game	Date	Team	Score	High points	High rebounds	High assists	Location Attendance	Record
4	January 2	Sacramento	W 102–94	John Wall (28)	Christian Wood (15)	John Wall (6)	Toyota Center; 0	2–2
5	January 4	Dallas	L 100–113	Christian Wood (23)	Christian Wood (7)	James Harden (10)	Toyota Center; 0	2–3
6	January 6	@ Indiana	L 107–114	John Wall (28)	DeMarcus Cousins (14)	James Harden (12)	Bankers Life Fieldhouse; 0	2–4
7	January 8	Orlando	W 132–90	Christian Wood (22)	Christian Wood (15)	James Harden (13)	Toyota Center; 0	3–4
8	January 10	L. A. Lakers	L 102–120	Christian Wood (23)	John Wall (10)	James Harden (9)	Toyota Center; 0	3–5
9	January 12	L. A. Lakers	L 100–117	Christian Wood (18)	DeMarcus Cousins (10)	James Harden (7)	Toyota Center; 0	3–6
10	January 14	@ San Antonio	W 109–105	Christian Wood (27)	Christian Wood (15)	Jae'Sean Tate (10)	AT&T Center; 0	4–6
11	January 16	@ San Antonio	L 91–103	Jones, Wood (24)	Christian Wood (18)	Jae'Sean Tate (5)	AT&T Center; 0	4–7
12	January 18	@ Chicago	L 120–125	Victor Oladipo (32)	Christian Wood (9)	Victor Oladipo (9)	United Center; 0	4–8
13	January 20	Phoenix	L 103–109	Gordon, Oladipo (22)	Christian Wood (11)	Victor Oladipo (6)	Toyota Center; 0	4–9
14	January 22	@ Detroit	W 103–102	Eric Gordon (20)	DeMarcus Cousins (15)	DeMarcus Cousins (7)	Little Caesars Arena; 0	5–9
15	January 23	@ Dallas	W 133–108	Eric Gordon (33)	DeMarcus Cousins (17)	John Wall (8)	American Airlines Center; 0	6–9
16	January 26	@ Washington	W 107–88	John Wall (24)	DeMarcus Cousins (11)	John Wall (5)	Toyota Center; 2,996	7–9
17	January 28	Portland	W 104–101	Victor Oladipo (25)	Christian Wood (12)	John Wall (6)	Toyota Center; 3,154	8–9
18	January 30	@ New Orleans	W 126–112	Christian Wood (27)	Tate, Wood (9)	John Wall (9)	Smoothie King Center; 1,440	9–9

February: 2–12 (home: 0–4; road: 2–8)

Game	Date	Team	Score	High points	High rebounds	High assists	Location Attendance	Record
19	February 1	@ Oklahoma City	W 136–106	Eric Gordon (25)	Christian Wood (11)	Victor Oladipo (7)	Chesapeake Energy Arena; 0	10–9
20	February 3	@ Oklahoma City	L 87–104	Eric Gordon (22)	Brown, Wood (6)	Eric Gordon (4)	Chesapeake Energy Arena; 0	10–10
21	February 4	@ Memphis	W 113–105	John Wall (22)	P. J. Tucker (8)	John Wall (8)	FedExForum; 0	11–10
22	February 6	San Antonio	L 106–111	John Wall (27)	DeMarcus Cousins (11)	Victor Oladipo (5)	Toyota Center; 0	11–11
23	February 8	@ Charlotte	L 94–119	Victor Oladipo (21)	DeMarcus Cousins (9)	Victor Oladipo (6)	Spectrum Center; 0	11–12
24	February 9	@ New Orleans	L 101–130	John Wall (25)	Cousins, Tate (7)	John Wall (6)	Smoothie King Center; 1,900	11–13
25	February 11	Miami	L 94–101	Gordon, Wall (17)	DeMarcus Cousins (11)	John Wall (7)	Toyota Center; 3,251	11–14
26	February 13	@ New York	L 99–121	John Wall (26)	DeMarcus Cousins (10)	Eric Gordon (6)	Madison Square Garden; 0	11–15
27	February 15	@ Washington	L 119–131	John Wall (29)	David Nwaba (11)	John Wall (11)	Capital One Arena; 0	11–16
28	February 17	@ Philadelphia	L 113–118	John Wall (28)	David Nwaba (10)	Eric Gordon (6)	Wells Fargo Center; 0	11–17
–	February 19	Dallas	Postponed (winter storm) (Makeup date: April 7)					
–	February 20	Indiana	Postponed (winter storm) (Makeup date: April 14)					
29	February 22	Chicago	L 100–120	David Nwaba (22)	David Nwaba (9)	John Wall (7)	Toyota Center; 3,025	11–18
30	February 24	@ Cleveland	L 96–112	John Wall (20)	Tate, Tucker (7)	Victor Oladipo (5)	Rocket Mortgage FieldHouse; 2,720	11–19
31	February 26	@ Toronto	L 111–122	Victor Oladipo (27)	Sterling Brown (10)	John Wall (12)	Amalie Arena; 0	11–20
32	February 28	Memphis	L 84–133	Tate, Wall (14)	Sterling Brown (6)	Sterling Brown (3)	Toyota Center; 3,284	11–21

March: 2–13 (home: 1–9; road: 1–4)

Game	Date	Team	Score	High points	High rebounds	High assists	Location Attendance	Record
33	March 1	Cleveland	L 90–101	John Wall (32)	Justin Patton (6)	John Wall (5)	Toyota Center; 3,046	11–22
34	March 3	Brooklyn	L 114–132	John Wall (36)	Jae'Sean Tate (10)	Oladipo, Wall (5)	Toyota Center; 3,615	11–23
35	March 11	@ Sacramento	L 105–125	Victor Oladipo (23)	Sterling Brown (10)	Kevin Porter Jr. (10)	Golden 1 Center; 0	11–24
36	March 12	@ Utah	L 99–114	Kevin Porter Jr. (27)	Kenyon Martin Jr. (10)	Kevin Porter Jr. (8)	Vivint Arena; 5,546	11–25
37	March 14	Boston	L 107–134	Victor Oladipo (26)	David Nwaba (7)	Kevin Porter Jr. (7)	Toyota Center; 3,264	11–26
38	March 16	Atlanta	L 107–119	Victor Oladipo (34)	Sterling Brown (11)	Kevin Porter Jr. (8)	Toyota Center; 3,069	11–27
39	March 17	Golden State	L 94–108	Kevin Porter Jr. (25)	Lamb, Martin Jr., Wood (9)	Kevin Porter Jr. (7)	Toyota Center; 3,259	11–28
40	March 19	Detroit	L 100–113	John Wall (21)	Christian Wood (11)	John Wall (7)	Toyota Center; 3,061	11–29
41	March 21	Oklahoma City	L 112–114	Christian Wood (27)	Jae'Sean Tate (9)	John Wall (7)	Toyota Center; 3,297	11–30
42	March 22	Toronto	W 117–99	Jae'Sean Tate (22)	John Wall (11)	John Wall (10)	Toyota Center; 2,965	12–30
43	March 24	Charlotte	L 97–122	John Wall (20)	Christian Wood (10)	Wall, Augustin (7)	Toyota Center; 3,163	12–31
44	March 26	@ Minnesota	L 101–107	Christian Wood (24)	Sterling Brown (11)	John Wall (15)	Target Center; 0	12–32
45	March 27	@ Minnesota	W 129–107	Kevin Porter Jr. (25)	Jae'Sean Tate (9)	John Wall (12)	Target Center; 0	13–32
46	March 29	Memphis	L 110–120	Kelly Olynyk (25)	Kelly Olynyk (9)	John Wall (8)	Toyota Center; 3,319	13–33
47	March 31	@ Brooklyn	L 108–120	Kevin Porter Jr. (20)	Christian Wood (8)	Kevin Porter Jr. (6)	Barclays Center; 1,773	13–34

April: 3–13 (home: 2–7; road: 1–6)

Game	Date	Team	Score	High points	High rebounds	High assists	Location Attendance	Record
48	April 2	@ Boston	L 102–118	Christian Wood (19)	Christian Wood (10)	Kevin Porter Jr. (8)	TD Garden; 0	13–35
49	April 4	New Orleans	L 115–122	Kelly Olynyk (26)	Christian Wood (12)	Augustin, Porter Jr. (5)	Toyota Center; 3,268	13–36
50	April 5	Phoenix	L 130–133	Christian Wood (23)	Kevin Porter Jr. (9)	Kevin Porter Jr. (8)	Toyota Center; 3,093	13–37
51	April 7	Dallas	W 102–93	John Wall (31)	Kelly Olynyk (18)	John Wall (7)	Toyota Center; 3,399	14–37
52	April 9	@ L. A. Clippers	L 109–126	Christian Wood (23)	Kelly Olynyk (11)	Kevin Porter Jr. (13)	Staples Center; 0	14–38
53	April 10	@ Golden State	L 109–125	John Wall (30)	Tate, Olynyk (11)	John Wall (7)	Chase Center; 0	14–39
54	April 12	@ Phoenix	L 109–125	Christian Wood (25)	Christian Wood (15)	Kevin Porter Jr. (14)	Phoenix Suns Arena; 4,145	14–40
55	April 14	Indiana	L 124–132	John Wall (31)	Christian Wood (13)	John Wall (9)	Toyota Center; 3,293	14–41
56	April 16	Denver	L 99–128	Kelly Olynyk (23)	Kenyon Martin Jr. (7)	Kevin Porter Jr. (5)	Toyota Center; 3,342	14–42
57	April 18	@ Orlando	W 114–110	Christian Wood (25)	Christian Wood (10)	Kevin Porter Jr. (7)	Toyota Center; 3,772	15–42
58	April 19	@ Miami	L 91–113	Porter Jr., Wood (18)	Kelly Olynyk (8)	John Wall (6)	American Airlines Arena; 0	15–43
59	April 21	Utah	L 89–112	John Wall (21)	Armoni Brooks (10)	John Wall (6)	Toyota Center; 3,253	15–44
60	April 23	L. A. Clippers	L 104–109	John Wall (27)	Christian Wood (19)	John Wall (13)	Toyota Center; 3,313	15–45
61	April 24	@ Denver	L 116–129	D. J. Wilson (25)	Olynyk, Wilson (8)	Kelly Olynyk (11)	Ball Arena; 4,035	15–46
62	April 27	Minnesota	L 107–114	Kelly Olynyk (28)	Christian Wood (18)	Olynyk, Porter Jr., Wood (5)	Toyota Center; 3,225	15–47
63	April 29	Milwaukee	W 143–136	Kevin Porter Jr. (50)	Kelly Olynyk (13)	Kevin Porter Jr. (11)	Toyota Center; 3,232	16–47

May: 1–8 (home: 1–3; road: 0–5)

Game	Date	Team	Score	High points	High rebounds	High assists	Location Attendance	Record
64	May 1	Golden State	L 87–113	Martin Jr., Porter Jr. (16)	Martin Jr., Olynyk (9)	Kevin Porter Jr. (6)	Toyota Center; 3,702	16–48
65	May 2	New York	L 97–122	Christian Wood (19)	Kelly Olynyk (10)	Kelly Olynyk (7)	Toyota Center; 3,431	16–49
66	May 5	Philadelphia	L 115–135	Kelly Olynyk (27)	Kelly Olynyk (11)	Kelly Olynyk (8)	Toyota Center; 3,583	16–50
67	May 7	@ Milwaukee	L 133–141	Kenyon Martin Jr. (26)	Kelly Olynyk (12)	House Jr., Martin Jr., Olynyk (7)	Fiserv Forum; 3,280	16–51
68	May 8	@ Utah	L 116–124	Martin Jr., Thomas (27)	Kenyon Martin Jr. (10)	Jae'Sean Tate (10)	Vivint Arena; 6,506	16–52
69	May 10	@ Portland	L 129–140	Augustin, Olynyk (21)	Kenyon Martin Jr. (9)	Jae'Sean Tate (9)	Moda Center; 1,939	16–53
70	May 12	@ L. A. Lakers	L 122–124	Brooks, Olynyk (24)	Kenyon Martin Jr. (10)	Khyri Thomas (11)	Staples Center; 4,087	16–54
71	May 14	L. A. Clippers	W 122–115	Olynyk, Tate (20)	Martin Jr., Olynyk (9)	Kelly Olynyk (11)	Toyota Center; 3,803	17–54
72	May 16	@ Atlanta	L 95–124	Augustin, Brooks (18)	Cameron Oliver (12)	Augustin, Tate (5)	State Farm Arena; 3,045	17–55

2020–21 season schedule

== Player statistics ==
Legend
GP	Games played	GS	Games started	MPG	Minutes per game
FG%	Field-goal percentage	3P%	3-point field-goal percentage	FT%	Free-throw percentage
RPG	Rebounds per game	APG	Assists per game	SPG	Steals per game
BPG	Blocks per game	PPG	Points per game

After all games.

Houston Rockets statistics
Player	GP	GS	MPG	FG%	3P%	FT%	RPG	APG	SPG	BPG	PPG
D. J. Augustin^{≠}	20	6	20.8	.424	.386	.907	2.2	3.9	.4	.0	10.6
Avery Bradley^{≠}	17	5	23.0	.314	.270	.833	2.3	1.9	.8	.1	5.2
Armoni Brooks^{≠}	20	5	26.0	.406	.382	.583	3.4	1.5	.6	.3	11.2
Sterling Brown	51	14	24.1	.448	.423	.806	4.4	1.4	.7	.2	8.2
Bruno Caboclo^{‡}	6	0	6.0	.471	.000	.500	2.3	.2	.0	.3	2.8
DeMarcus Cousins^{‡}	25	11	20.2	.376	.336	.746	7.6	2.4	.8	.7	9.6
Eric Gordon	27	13	29.2	.433	.329	.825	2.1	2.6	.5	.5	17.8
James Harden^{†}	8	8	36.3	.444	.347	.883	5.1	10.4	.9	.8	24.8
Danuel House	36	23	25.9	.404	.346	.651	3.7	1.9	.6	.4	8.8
DaQuan Jeffries^{‡}	13	3	20.1	.413	.282	1.000	3.2	1.2	.6	.5	4.9
Mason Jones^{‡}	26	1	11.8	.412	.359	.614	2.0	1.5	.2	.0	5.8
Rodions Kurucs^{†}	11	0	6.8	.238	.133	.500	1.0	.4	.5	.4	1.2
Anthony Lamb^{≠}	24	3	17.3	.390	.324	.857	2.9	1.0	.3	.2	5.5
Kenyon Martin	45	8	23.7	.509	.365	.714	5.4	1.1	.7	.9	9.3
Ben McLemore^{‡}	32	4	16.8	.357	.331	.719	2.1	.9	.6	.1	7.4
David Nwaba	30	9	22.6	.486	.270	.691	3.9	1.0	1.0	.7	9.2
Victor Oladipo^{†}	20	20	33.5	.407	.320	.783	4.8	5.0	1.2	.5	21.2
Cameron Oliver^{≠}	4	0	21.8	.576	.308	.250	5.3	1.3	.5	1.0	10.8
Kelly Olynyk^{≠}	27	24	31.1	.545	.392	.844	8.4	4.1	1.4	.6	19.0
Justin Patton^{‡}	13	6	19.0	.414	.265	.750	3.8	1.1	.9	1.1	5.4
Kevin Porter^{≠}	26	23	32.1	.426	.311	.734	3,8	6.3	.7	.3	16.6
Cameron Reynolds^{≠}	2	0	17.0	.313	.250	.000	2.5	1.0	.0	.0	6.5
Ray Spalding^{‡}	2	0	9.5	.500	.000	.000	2.0	.0	.0	1.0	2.0
Jae'Sean Tate	70	58	29.2	.506	.308	.694	5.3	2.5	1.2	.5	11.3
Brodric Thomas^{‡}	4	0	6.0	.286	.167	.714	1.0	1.0	.3	.3	2.5
Khyri Thomas^{≠}	5	2	30.6	.485	.333	1.000	3.6	5.0	1.8	1.2	16.4
P. J. Tucker^{†}	32	32	30.0	.366	.314	.783	3.6	4.6	.9	.6	4.4
John Wall	40	40	32.2	.404	.317	.749	3.2	6.9	1.1	.8	20.6
D. J. Wilson^{≠}	23	1	14.3	.416	.339	.696	3.8	.9	.4	.5	6.1
Christian Wood	41	41	32.3	.514	.374	.631	9.6	1.7	.8	1.2	21.0

^{‡}Waived during the season
^{†}Traded during the season
^{≠}Acquired during the season

== Transactions ==
=== Trades ===
November 22, 2020	To Houston Rockets Trevor Ariza; Draft rights to Isaiah Stewart; 2021 first-round pick	To Portland Trail Blazers Robert Covington
November 24, 2020	To Houston Rockets Christian Wood (sign and trade); 2021 first-round pick 2021 second-round pick	To Detroit Pistons Trevor Ariza; Draft rights to Isaiah Stewart; 2027 second-round pick Cash considerations
November 25, 2020	To Houston Rockets Draft rights to Kenyon Martin Jr.	To Sacramento Kings 2021 second-round pick Cash considerations
November 27, 2020	To Houston Rockets Draft rights to Issuf Sanon	To New York Knicks Austin Rivers (sign and trade); Draft rights to Tadija Dragićević; Draft rights to Axel Hervelle; Draft rights to Sergio Llull
December 2, 2020	To Houston Rockets John Wall; 2023 first-round pick	To Washington Wizards Russell Westbrook
January 13, 2021 (Four-team trade)	To Houston Rockets Victor Oladipo; Dante Exum; Rodions Kurucs; 2022 first-round pick 2022 first-round pick 2024 first-round pick 2026 first-round pick 2021 first-round pick swap 2023 first-round pick swap 2025 first-round pick swap 2027 first-round pick swap	To Brooklyn Nets James Harden; 2024 second-round pick
January 13, 2021 (Four-team trade)	To Indiana Pacers Caris LeVert; 2023 second-round pick 2024 second-round pick Cash considerations	To Cleveland Cavaliers Jarrett Allen; Taurean Prince; Draft rights to Sasha Vezenkov
January 22, 2021	To Houston Rockets Kevin Porter Jr.	To Cleveland Cavaliers 2024 second-round pick
March 19, 2021	To Houston Rockets D. J. Augustin; D. J. Wilson; 2021 first-round pick 2023 first-round pick	To Milwaukee Bucks P. J. Tucker; Rodions Kurucs; 2021 second-round pick 2022 first-round pick
March 25, 2021	To Houston Rockets Avery Bradley; Kelly Olynyk; 2022 first-round pick	To Miami Heat Victor Oladipo

=== Free agency ===
==== Re-signed ====
Player	Signed
Bruno Caboclo	2-year contract worth $4.3 million

==== Additions ====
Player	Signed	Former team
Mason Jones	Two-way contract / 10-day contract	Arkansas Razorbacks
Kenny Wooten	Claimed off waivers	New York Knicks
Sterling Brown	1-year contract worth $1.6 million	Milwaukee Bucks
Jae'Sean Tate	2-year contract worth $2.9 million	(Australia) Sydney Kings
Brodric Thomas	Exhibit 10 contract / Two-way contract	Truman Bulldogs
Trevelin Queen	Exhibit 10 contract	New Mexico State Aggies
Jerian Grant	1-year contract worth $1.8 million	Washington Wizards
Gerald Green	1-year contract worth $2.5 million	Denver Nuggets
DeMarcus Cousins	1-year contract worth $2.3 million	Los Angeles Lakers
Trey Mourning	Exhibit 10 contract	Sioux Falls Skyforce
William McDowell-White	Two-way contract	(Germany) Brose Bamberg
Josh Reaves	Exhibit 10 contract	Dallas Mavericks
Ray Spalding	Two-way contract	Charlotte Hornets
Justin Patton	Two-way contract	Westchester Knicks
Anthony Lamb	Two-way contract	Rio Grande Valley Vipers
Armoni Brooks	Two-way contract	Rio Grande Valley Vipers
DaQuan Jeffries	Claimed off waivers	Sacramento Kings
Khyri Thomas	10-day contract / 3-year contract worth $5.8 million	Austin Spurs
Cameron Oliver	10-day contract	(Australia) Cairns Taipans
Cameron Reynolds	10-day contract	San Antonio Spurs

==== Subtractions ====
Player	Reason left	New team
Jerian Grant	Waived	(Greece) Promitheas Patras B.C.
Trevelin Queen	Waived	Rio Grande Valley Vipers
Josh Reaves	Waived	Rio Grande Valley Vipers
William McDowell-White	Waived	Rio Grande Valley Vipers
Gerald Green	Waived	—
Trey Mourning	Waived	—
Bruno Caboclo	Waived	(France) Limoges CSP
DeMarcus Cousins	Waived	Los Angeles Clippers
Mason Jones	Waived	Philadelphia 76ers
Ray Spalding	Waived	—
Justin Patton	Waived	—
Ben McLemore	Waived	Los Angeles Lakers
DaQuan Jeffries	Waived / Claimed off waivers	San Antonio Spurs
Cameron Oliver	Contract expired	(Australia) Cairns Taipans
Cameron Reynolds	Contract expired	—

== Awards ==
Jae'Sean Tate was the only player to have been named to an all-NBA team as an All-Rookie First Team Player.
