= David Nwaba =

American basketball player (born 1993)

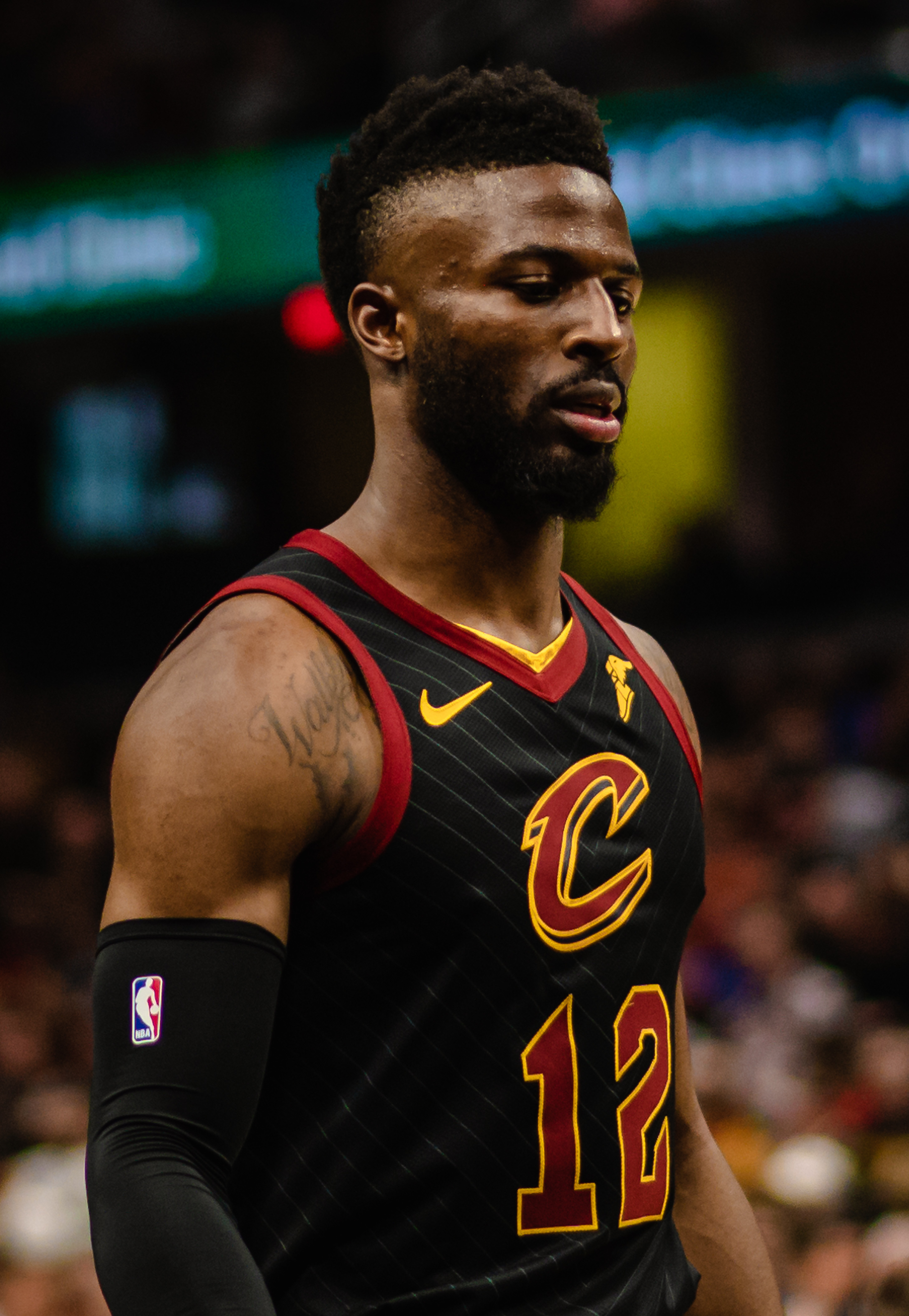
- Nwaba with the Cleveland Cavaliers in 2019

No. 17 – Ryukyu Golden Kings
- Position: Shooting guard / small forward
- League: B.League

Personal information
- Born: January 14, 1993 (age 33) Los Angeles, California, U.S.
- Listed height: 6 ft 5 in (1.96 m)
- Listed weight: 219 lb (99 kg)

Career information
- High school: University (Los Angeles, California)
- College: Santa Monica (2012–2013); Cal Poly (2013–2016)
- NBA draft: 2016: undrafted
- Playing career: 2016–present

Career history
- 2016–2017: Los Angeles D-Fenders
- 2017: Los Angeles Lakers
- 2017: →Los Angeles D-Fenders
- 2017–2018: Chicago Bulls
- 2018–2019: Cleveland Cavaliers
- 2019–2020: Brooklyn Nets
- 2020–2022: Houston Rockets
- 2022–2023: Motor City Cruise
- 2024: London Lions
- 2024–2026: San-en NeoPhoenix
- 2026–present: Ryukyu Golden Kings

Career highlights
- NBA D-League All-Defensive Team (2017); NBA D-League All-Rookie Team (2017); WSC South Division Player of the Year (2013)
- Stats at NBA.com
- Stats at Basketball Reference

David Ugochukwu Nwaba// (born January 14, 1993) is an American professional basketball player for the San-en NeoPhoenix of the Japanese B.League. He played college basketball for Santa Monica College and Cal Poly.

== High school career ==
Nwaba attended University High School in Los Angeles, where he was a two-time All-Western League Most Valuable Player honoree and all-league first team selection. As a senior in 2010–11, he averaged 22.0 points and 11.5 rebounds per game.

== College career ==
While initially joining Hawaii Pacific, Nwaba redshirted the 2011–12 season and transferred to Santa Monica College in 2012. In 2012–13, he was named Western State Conference South Division Player of the Year and to the All-California Community College Athletic Association state first team after averaging 20.5 points, 8.8 rebounds and 2.5 assists per game.

In 2013, Nwaba transferred again, this time to Cal Poly. As a sophomore in 2013–14, he appeared in all 34 games with 30 starts and finished eighth among Big West Conference players and 59th among NCAA Division I players with a team-leading 52.6 (140-for-266) field-goal percentage. He also finished second in the lineup with 11.7 points and 4.8 rebounds per game and 21 blocks. He was named to Big West All-Tournament Team after averaging 14.0 points and shooting 72.7 (16-for-22) percent from the floor in three contests. On December 14, 2013, he scored a career-high 22 points on 11-for-13 shooting against Cal State Dominguez Hills.

As a junior in 2014–15, Nwaba finished second in Cal Poly's lineup and 15th among Big West Conference players with 11.4 points per game. He also averaged 4.7 rebounds and had 31 steals at 1.3 per game. He recorded 16 double-digit scoring games, including a season-high 21 points against Gonzaga on December 20, 2014.

As a senior in 2015–16, Nwaba earned All-Big West Honorable Mention selection after averaging 12.5 points, 6.3 rebounds, 3.5 assists and 1.2 steals in 30 games. At the end of his Cal Poly career, Nwaba ranked 15th in program history in rebounds with a total of 465 and was one of 23 players to score more than 1,000 career points.

== Professional career ==
=== Los Angeles D-Fenders (2016–2017) ===
After graduating from Cal Poly in spring 2016 with a sociology degree, Nwaba headed to Reno, Nevada, to try out for the NBA Development League's Reno Bighorns. The Bighorns were awarded his rights but later traded those rights to the Los Angeles D-Fenders on October 30, 2016. Nwaba joined the D-Fenders for training camp and made the opening-night roster.

In his G-League debut on November 11, 2016, Nwaba played 21 minutes and recorded 11 points, seven rebounds, three blocks, and one steal as the D-Fenders defeated the Iowa Energy 127–98. Playing a total of 40 regular season games for the D-Fenders in the 2016–17 season, Nwaba averaged 14.1 points and 6.9 rebounds in 28.7 minutes per game. The team would make the playoffs and despite Nwaba's averages of 23.3 points, 8.3 rebounds, and 2.3 assists, they would be eliminated in the first round by the Rio Grande Valley Vipers in three games. Nwaba was assigned to the D-Fenders four times during his rookie season with the Lakers.

=== Los Angeles Lakers (2017) ===
On February 28, 2017, Nwaba signed a 10-day contract with the Los Angeles Lakers. That night, Nwaba made his NBA debut in a 109–104 loss to the Charlotte Hornets, playing a little over five minutes and only recording one rebound as a statistic. On March 11, 2017, he signed a second 10-day contract with the Lakers. He made his first start for the Lakers a day later, recording six points, one rebound, and one block in a 118–116 loss to the Philadelphia 76ers. On March 21, Nwaba signed a multi–year contract with the Lakers. During his rookie season with the Lakers, Nwaba played 20 games with the team (having a 5–15 record for those 20 games), averaging 6.0 points and 3.2 rebounds in 19.9 minutes. On July 12, Nwaba was waived by the Lakers.

=== Chicago Bulls (2017–2018) ===
On July 14, 2017, Nwaba was claimed off waivers by the Chicago Bulls. Early in the 2017–18 season, Nwaba entered the starting lineup multiple times and was lauded by his teammates for his ability to contest shots. On February 22, 2018, Nwaba scored a career-high 21 points while also grabbing nine rebounds in a 115–116 loss against the Philadelphia 76ers. Nwaba's time with the Bulls would be his most productive as he played (and started) the most games of his career in a season with the Bulls and averaged a career–high in minutes, rebounds, and assists per game.

=== Cleveland Cavaliers (2018–2019) ===
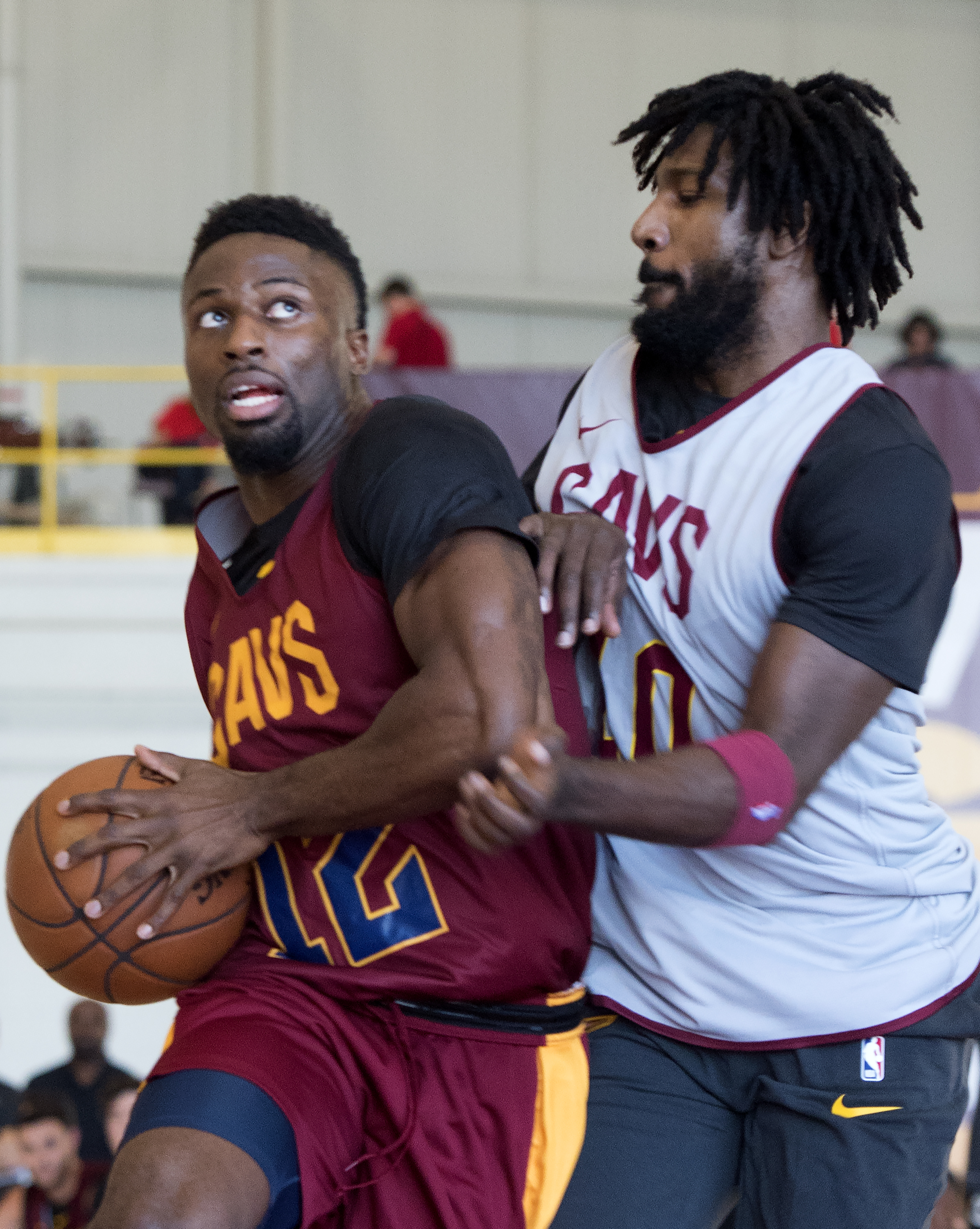
Nwaba (left) in the 2018 Cleveland Cavaliers Wine & Gold Scrimmage

On September 8, 2018, Nwaba signed with the Cleveland Cavaliers. From November 26 to December 10, Nwaba missed nine games due to right knee soreness. He returned and played seven games for the team, averaging 5.5 points and 2.8 rebounds in those seven games. Unfortunately, Nwaba would face more nagging injuries and would miss another 18 games from December 26 to January 29, 2019, due to a sprained left ankle. He returned to finish the remaining 30 games for the Cavs' regular season (starting in eight of those games) as the Cavs finished with a 19–63 record.

=== Brooklyn Nets (2019–2020) ===
On July 17, 2019, Nwaba signed with the Brooklyn Nets. Nwaba played in 20 of the Nets' first 28 games of the season and averaged 5.2 points and 2.3 rebounds in those 20 games.

On December 19, Nwaba suffered a season-ending Achilles tear in a game against the San Antonio Spurs.

Two weeks after the ankle Achilles tear, on January 3, 2020, Nwaba was waived by the Nets.

=== Houston Rockets (2020–2022) ===
On June 23, 2020, Nwaba signed a two-year deal with the Houston Rockets.

On February 22, 2021, the Rockets suffered their 11th loss in a row by losing 84–133 to the Memphis Grizzlies. In that game, Nwaba injured his wrist on a dunk attempt and was expected to miss six weeks of action. He would miss the next three games initially then returned to the team to play against the Utah Jazz on March 12 (losing to the Jazz by 15) and the Boston Celtics on March 14 (losing to the Celtics by 27). After those losses, Nwaba would be sidelined for the rest of the season as the Rockets finished with a league-worst 17–55 record.

On September 30, 2022, Nwaba was traded, along with Trey Burke, Sterling Brown, and Marquese Chriss, to the Oklahoma City Thunder in exchange for Derrick Favors, Ty Jerome, Maurice Harkless, Théo Maledon, and a future second-round pick. Nwaba would be waived by the Thunder on October 17, two days before the team's season-opener.

=== Motor City Cruise (2022–2023) ===
Nwaba was picked up off waivers by the Lakeland Magic of the G-League. But on December 17, 2022, Nwaba was traded to the Motor City Cruise. In his debut for the Cruise during the regular season on December 27, Nwaba recorded eight points, nine rebounds, three assists, and two steals in 34 minutes during a 108–115 loss to the Capital City Go-Go. For his first season with the Cruise, Nwaba played in 25 games and averaged 16.0 points, 8.8 rebounds, and 3.2 assists across 32.7 minutes.

On October 21, 2023, Nwaba signed with the Detroit Pistons, but was waived the same day. On November 8, he re-joined the Motor City Cruise. For his second season with the Cruise, Nwaba would only play in three games during the regular season, averaging 14.0 points and 5.3 rebounds. After his final game with the Cruise on December 30, he would leave the team in order to play professionally overseas.

=== London Lions (2024) ===
On January 8, 2024, Nwaba signed with the London Lions of the British Basketball League.

=== San-en NeoPhoenix (2024–2026) ===
On July 24, 2024, Nwaba signed with the San-en NeoPhoenix of the B.League.

== NBA career statistics ==
Legend
GP	Games played	GS	Games started	MPG	Minutes per game
FG%	Field goal percentage	3P%	3-point field goal percentage	FT%	Free throw percentage
RPG	Rebounds per game	APG	Assists per game	SPG	Steals per game
BPG	Blocks per game	PPG	Points per game	**Bold**	Career high

=== Regular season ===
Year	Team	GP	GS	MPG	FG%	3P%	FT%	RPG	APG	SPG	BPG	PPG
2016–17	L.A. Lakers	20	2	19.9	**.580**	.200	.641	3.2	.7	.6	.4	6.0
2017–18	Chicago	**70**	**21**	**23.5**	.478	.346	.655	**4.7**	**1.5**	.8	.4	7.9
2018–19	Cleveland	51	14	19.3	.481	.320	.682	3.2	1.1	.7	.3	6.5
2019–20	Brooklyn	20	0	13.4	.521	**.429**	.667	2.3	.4	.6	.6	5.2
2020–21	Houston	30	9	22.6	.486	.270	.691	3.9	1.0	**1.0**	**.7**	**9.2**
2021–22	Houston	46	4	13.2	.483	.306	**.716**	3.3	.8	.6	.4	5.1
Career		237	50	19.3	.490	.320	.673	3.7	1.0	.7	.4	6.8

== Personal life ==
Nwaba is the son of Theodore and Blessing Nwaba, both of whom are Nigerian origin. He has 5 siblings: two brothers Victor and Alex, and 3 sisters Jane, Precious, and Barbara. Barbara is a professional heptathlete who competed at UC Santa Barbara, won the 2015 and 2016 National Championships title and competed in the 2016 Olympics.
