= Sterling Brown (basketball) =

American basketball player (born 1995)

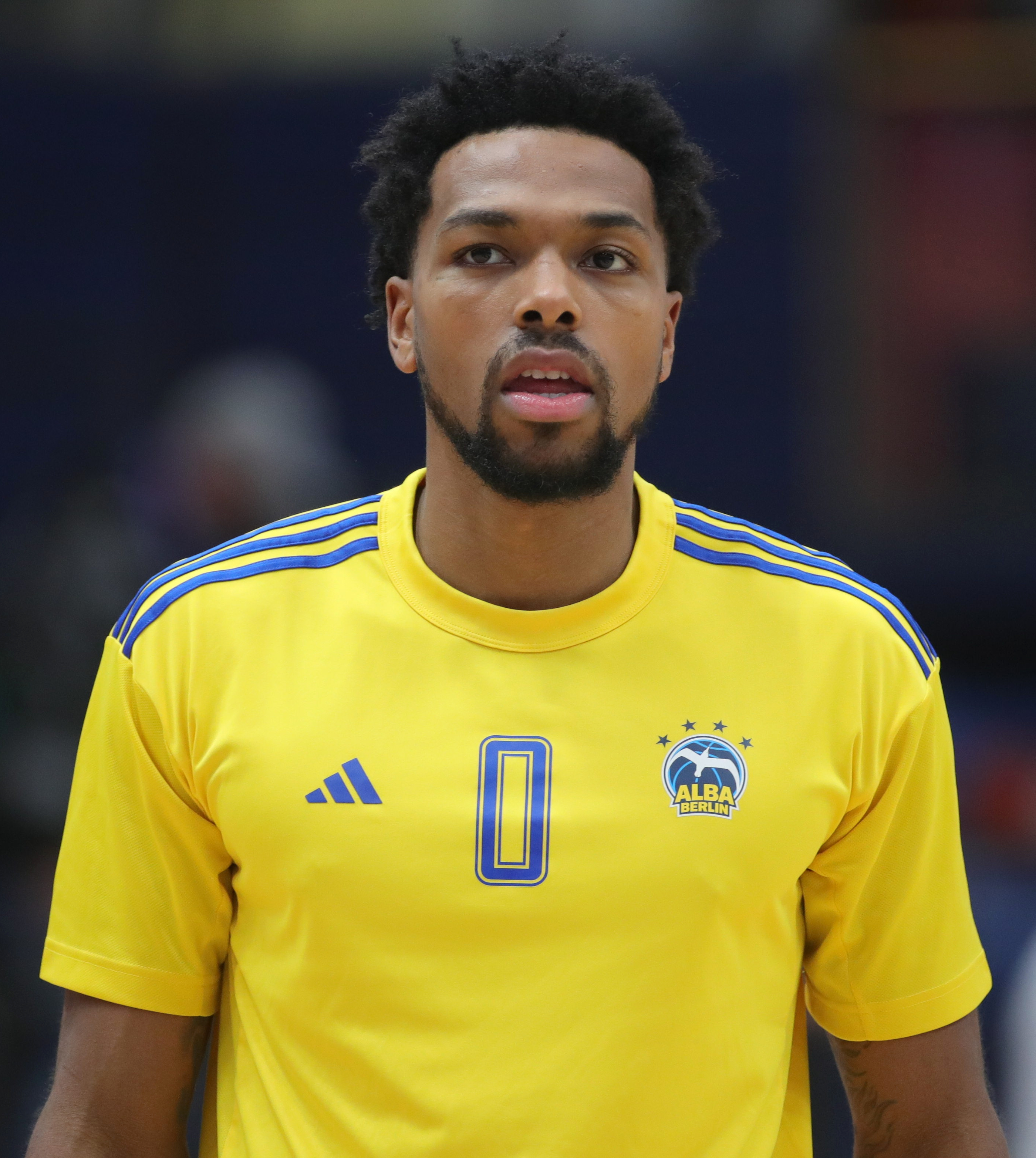
- Brown with Alba Berlin in 2023

No. 0 – Žalgiris Kaunas
- Position: Small forward / shooting guard
- League: LKL; EuroLeague

Personal information
- Born: February 10, 1995 (age 31) Maywood, Illinois, U.S.
- Listed height: 6 ft 5 in (1.96 m)
- Listed weight: 219 lb (99 kg)

Career information
- High school: Proviso East (Maywood, Illinois)
- College: SMU (2013–2017)
- NBA draft: 2017: 2nd round, 46th overall pick
- Drafted by: Philadelphia 76ers
- Playing career: 2017–present

Career history
- 2017–2020: Milwaukee Bucks
- 2017–2018: →Wisconsin Herd
- 2020–2021: Houston Rockets
- 2021–2022: Dallas Mavericks
- 2022–2023: Raptors 905
- 2023: Los Angeles Lakers
- 2023–2024: Alba Berlin
- 2024–2026: Partizan
- 2026–present: Žalgiris Kaunas

Career highlights
- EuroLeague 50–40–90 club (2025); ABA League champion (2025); All-ABA League Team (2025); Second-team All-AAC (2017)
- Stats at NBA.com
- Stats at Basketball Reference

Sterling Damarco Brown (born February 10, 1995) is an American professional basketball player for Žalgiris Kaunas of the Lithuanian Basketball League (LKL) and the EuroLeague. He played college basketball for Southern Methodist University (SMU) from 2013 to 2017. As a senior, he earned second-team all-conference honors in the American Athletic Conference (AAC). Brown was drafted 46th overall in the 2017 NBA draft by the Philadelphia 76ers.

== High school and college career ==
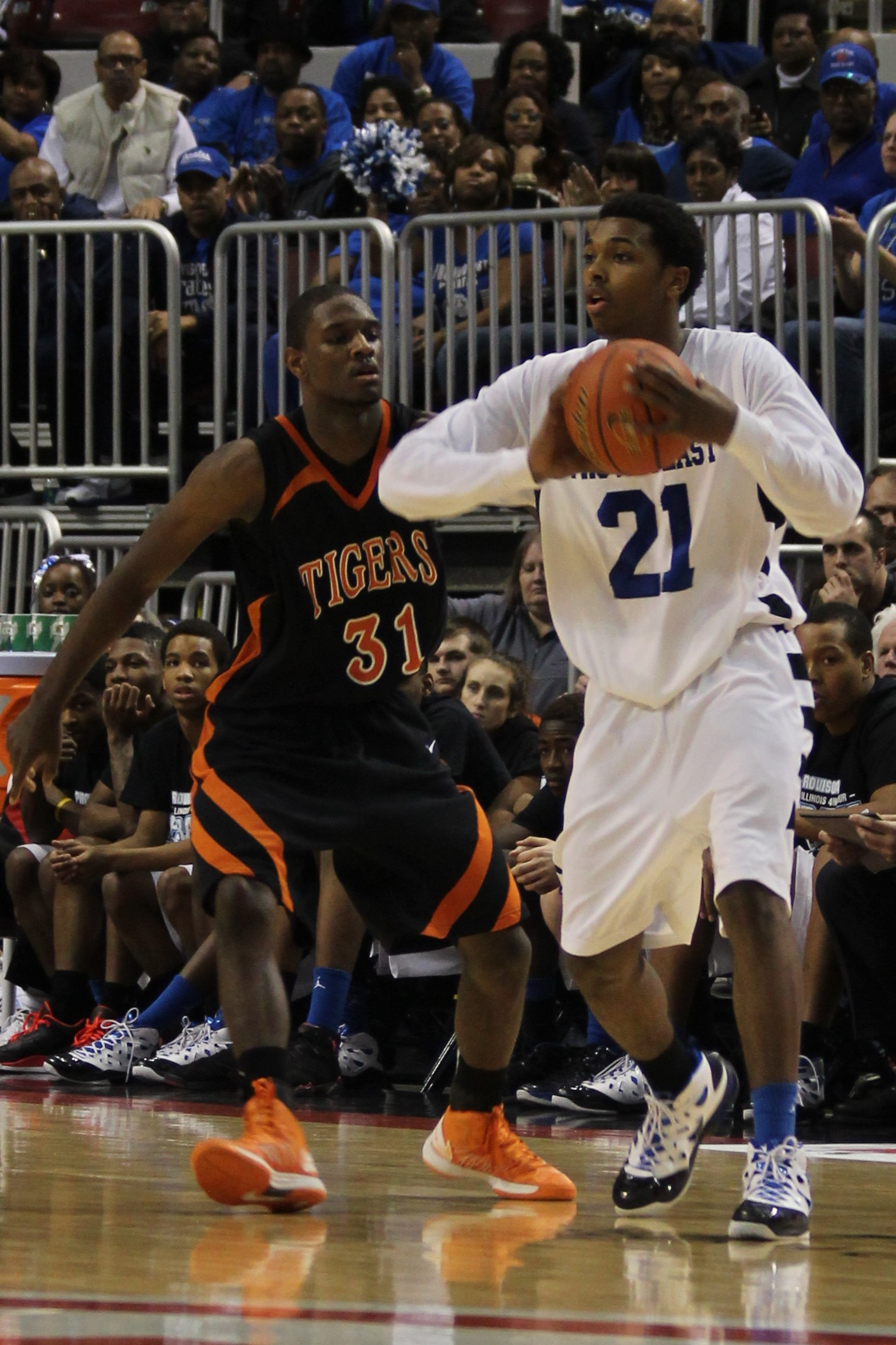
Brown in the 2013 IHSA consolation game

Brown is the son of Chris Brown who was a police officer in the Chicago metropolitan area for 30 years in Maywood, Illinois. Brown played high school basketball at Proviso East High School in Maywood, Illinois. Playing for coach Donnie Boyce, he led the Pirates to a state runner-up finish in 2012 and a state semi-final appearance in 2013, losing both times to the Jabari Parker-led Simeon Career Academy. As a junior, the Chicago Tribune named him to the 2012 third team All-state team along with Billy Garrett Jr., Milton Doyle, Tony Hicks and Rashaun Stimage. The Associated Press named him to its 2013 Class 4A All-state first team along with Parker, Jahlil Okafor, Hill, and Cliff Alexander. He finished the year as the sixth rated national class of 2013 recruit in Illinois at number 75 according to Rivals.com. Brown ultimately selected SMU and coach Larry Brown over Miami, Tennessee and Xavier.

Brown and the Mustang class of 2017 endured three years of adversity as they missed the NCAA tournament in his freshman season. The following season, they were upset in the first round of the Tournament. In his junior year, SMU served an NCAA probation in 2015–16. In his senior season, Brown averaged 13.4 points and 6.5 rebounds per game. Along with Semi Ojeleye he led the Mustangs to a 30–5 record and regular-season and Tournament American Athletic Conference championships. At the close of the season, Brown was named second-team All-conference. Brown finished his Mustang career as the school's all-time leader in wins.

== Professional career ==
=== Milwaukee Bucks (2017–2020) ===
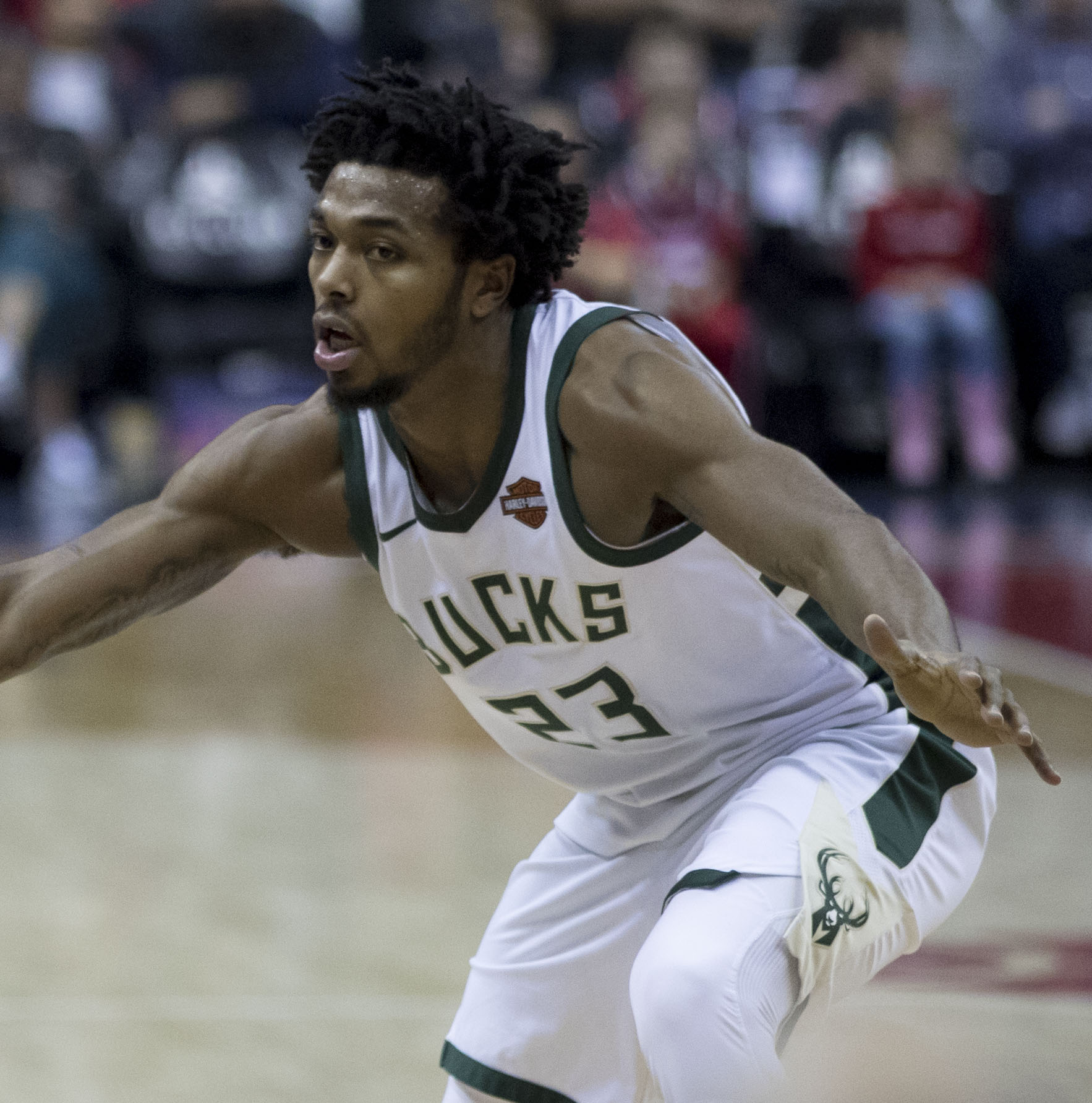
Brown with the Milwaukee Bucks in 2018

Following the close of his college career, Brown raised his profile by appearing in the NABC College All-Star game and attended the Portsmouth Invitational Tournament. He was considered a potential second-round prospect for the 2017 NBA draft. Brown was drafted in the second round with the 46th pick of the 2017 NBA draft by the Philadelphia 76ers. On July 6, 2017, his draft rights were traded to the Milwaukee Bucks in exchange for cash considerations. Brown appeared in his first NBA game on October 20, 2017, against the Cleveland Cavaliers, posting three points in six minutes in Milwaukee's second game of the season. On November 3, 2018, Brown was assigned to the Wisconsin Herd. In his first game of the 2018–19 season, he scored 22 points on 10-of-17 from the field. When Malcolm Brogdon was unavailable on January 20, 2018, against Philadelphia, Brown started and scored 14 points. He posted a season-high 15 points on March 7, against the Houston Rockets.

On January 26, 2018, Brown was tased and arrested inappropriately according to the Milwaukee Police Department Police Chief Alfonso Morales the following May. Brown brought suit in June 2018 after the May release of bodycam footage and alleges racial profiling occurred in the administration of a parking ticket at a Walgreens parking lot. After the incident an investigation was launched which resulted in 8 officers disciplined, with 3 of them suspended and 1 officer terminated.

In October 2019, Brown rejected a $400,000 settlement offer from the Milwaukee City Council. The high settlement offer was a legal maneuver intended to take advantage of Federal Rules of Civil Procedure 68. Under Rule 68 Sterling is responsible for the city's legal fees and incurred expenses if he loses the case or wins damages less than $400,000. Brown expressed that he rejected the offer in part due to his ability and sense of responsibility to use his platform as an NBA player to raise awareness. Brown's attorney, Mark Thomsen, condemned the settlement offer, saying it was the city's attempt to save face instead of admitting wrongdoing. As of November 27, 2019, court filings indicate that a federal civil rights lawsuit is proceeding to trial.

On March 31, 2019, Brown posted a career-high 27 points, including a go-ahead layup with 1.1 seconds remaining in overtime against the Atlanta Hawks.

=== Houston Rockets (2020–2021) ===
On November 26, 2020, Brown signed with the Houston Rockets.

On April 18, 2021, Brown suffered serious facial injuries during a fight outside of a Miami night club.

=== Dallas Mavericks (2021–2022) ===
Brown signed with the Dallas Mavericks on August 10, 2021. He made his debut on October 21, 2021, in an 87–113 loss to the Atlanta Hawks, scoring three points.

On June 24, 2022, Brown was traded alongside Boban Marjanović, Trey Burke, Marquese Chriss, and the draft rights to Wendell Moore Jr., to the Houston Rockets in exchange for Christian Wood.

On September 30, 2022, Brown was traded, along with David Nwaba, Trey Burke, and Marquese Chriss, to the Oklahoma City Thunder in exchange for Derrick Favors, Ty Jerome, Maurice Harkless, Théo Maledon and a future second-round pick. On October 2, Brown was waived by the Thunder.

=== Raptors 905 / Los Angeles Lakers (2022–2023) ===
On December 17, 2022, Brown signed with Raptors 905 of the NBA G League.

On January 6, 2023, Brown signed a ten-day contract with the Los Angeles Lakers, appearing in four games. On January 16, he was re-acquired by Raptors 905 after his contract with the Lakers expired.

=== Alba Berlin (2023–2024) ===
On August 15, 2023, Brown signed with Basketball Bundesliga and EuroLeague club Alba Berlin.

=== Partizan (2024–2026) ===
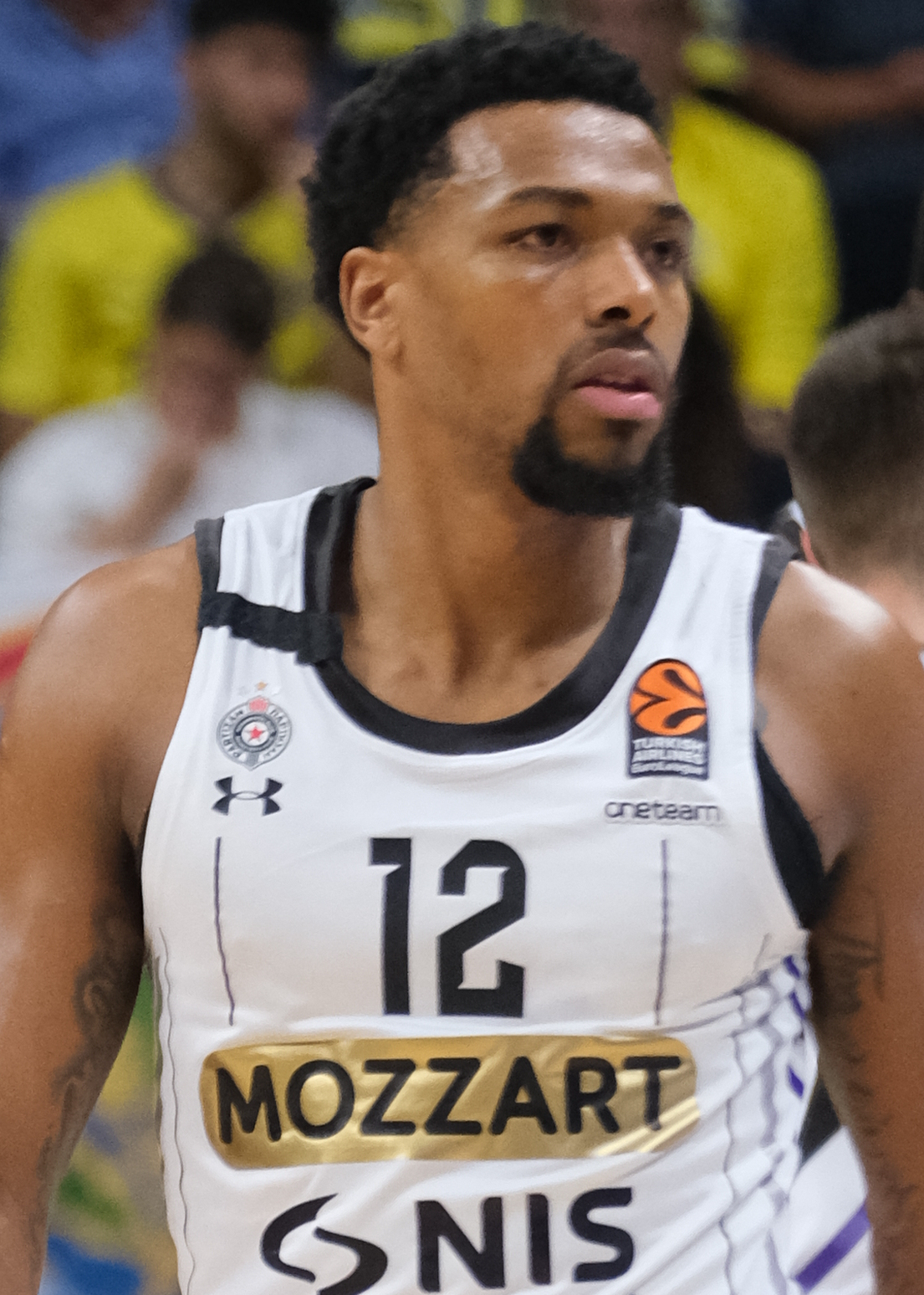
Brown with Partizan in 2024

On August 20, 2024, Brown signed with Partizan Mozzart Bet of the ABA League, Basketball League of Serbia (KLS) and the EuroLeague. In his debut season with Partizan, Brown averaged career-high 12.4 points over 34 EuroLeague games, on 52.3% shooting from the field. During the 2024–25 season, Partizan managed to lift the record eighth ABA League championship, and the Serbian League championship, the first one after 11 seasons.

On March 28, 2026, Brown received a Round 34 MVP honors after scoring 31 points, 7 rebounds, 2 assists and a steal. The award was the first MVP of the Round recognition of his Euroleague career as well as the first for a Partizan player this season.

=== Žalgiris Kaunas (2026–present) ===
On July 7, 2026, Brown signed a 1+1 contract with Lithuanian club Žalgiris Kaunas. The transfer was finalized following a reported $530,000 buyout fee paid to Partizan.

== Career statistics ==
Legend
GP	Games played	GS	Games started	MPG	Minutes per game
FG%	Field-goal percentage	3P%	3-point field-goal percentage	FT%	Free-throw percentage
RPG	Rebounds per game	APG	Assists per game	SPG	Steals per game
BPG	Blocks per game	PPG	Points per game	PIR	Performance index rating
**Bold**	Career high

=== EuroLeague ===
Year	Team	GP	GS	MPG	FG%	3P%	FT%	RPG	APG	SPG	BPG	PPG	PIR
2023–24	Alba Berlin	29	21	24.1	.402	.357	**.930**	**3.3**	**2.4**	.8	**.2**	11.2	8.6
2024–25	Partizan	34	30	25.8	**.523**	**.469**	.929	3.0	2.1	.8	**.2**	12.4	**11.5**
2025–26	Partizan	**37**	**33**	**28.1**	.457	.392	.905	2.8	2.3	**.9**	**.2**	**13.7**	11.0
Career		100	84	26.1	.461	.404	.919	3.0	2.3	.8	.2	12.6	10.5

=== NBA ===
==== Regular season ====
Year	Team	GP	GS	MPG	FG%	3P%	FT%	RPG	APG	SPG	BPG	PPG
2017–18	Milwaukee	54	4	14.4	.400	.352	.875	2.6	.5	.6	**.2**	4.0
2018–19	Milwaukee	**58**	7	17.8	**.465**	.361	.690	3.2	**1.4**	.4	.1	6.4
2019–20	Milwaukee	52	1	14.7	.371	.324	.800	3.5	1.0	.6	.1	5.1
2020–21	Houston	51	**14**	**24.1**	.448	**.423**	.806	**4.4**	**1.4**	**.8**	**.2**	**8.2**
2021–22	Dallas	49	3	12.8	.381	.304	**.933**	3.0	.7	.3	.1	3.3
2022–23	L.A. Lakers	4	0	6.1	.000	.000	—	2.0	.5	**.8**	—	0.0
Career		268	29	16.6	.419	.363	.796	3.3	1.0	.5	.2	5.3

==== Playoffs ====
Year	Team	GP	GS	MPG	FG%	3P%	FT%	RPG	APG	SPG	BPG	PPG
2018	Milwaukee	3	0	4.2	**.600**	**.333**	—	.7	—	.3	—	2.3
2019	Milwaukee	**11**	**5**	**14.7**	.395	**.333**	**.727**	**2.7**	**1.7**	**.5**	**.3**	**4.1**
2020	Milwaukee	1	0	3.6	.000	.000	—	1.0	—	—	—	0.0
2022	Dallas	9	0	2.8	.300	.000	.714	.9	.3	.4	.2	1.2
Career		24	5	8.5	.389	.276	.722	1.7	.9	.5	.2	2.6

=== Domestic leagues ===
Year	Team	League	GP	MPG	FG%	3P%	FT%	RPG	APG	SPG	BPG	PPG
2017–18	(United States) Wisconsin Herd	G League	3	32.7	.421	.294	.857	6.0	2.0	2.0	.3	21.7
2018–19	(United States) Wisconsin Herd	G League	3	36.5	.471	.333	.500	7.0	4.0	1.7	—	21.7
2022–23	(United States) Raptors 905	G League	26	32.1	.484	.441	.763	7.0	4.5	1.0	.4	15.5
2023–24	(Germany) Alba Berlin	BBL	41	23.9	.489	.353	.910	4.0	3.1	.9	.1	14.0
2024–25	(Serbia) Partizan	ABA	37	22.7	.536	.479	.885	2.2	2.1	.9	.1	11.8

=== College ===
Year	Team	GP	GS	MPG	FG%	3P%	FT%	RPG	APG	SPG	BPG	PPG
2013–14	SMU	**37**	26	19.4	.469	.362	.571	3.8	1.1	.7	.3	4.4
2014–15	SMU	34	17	23.9	.525	.444	.784	4.6	2.1	.9	.2	5.2
2015–16	SMU	30	29	27.2	**.602**	**.536**	**.857**	4.4	2.6	1.1	.4	10.1
2016–17	SMU	35	**34**	**32.7**	.459	.449	.791	**6.5**	**3.0**	**1.4**	**.5**	**13.4**
Career		136	107	25.7	.504	.451	.770	4.8	2.2	1.0	.4	8.2

== 2018 Milwaukee police incident ==
On January 26, 2018, at 2 am, Brown was approached by a Milwaukee police officer because his car was straddling two handicapped parking spaces. This occurred in a nearly empty Walgreens parking lot on the south end of the city, the intersection of South 27th street and National Ave. After Brown interacted with the officer, who requested backup, a number of officers arrived on scene. Several minutes after the first officer began talking with Brown, an officer yelled at Brown to remove his hands from the pockets of his hoodie. Brown responded, "I’ve got stuff in my hands". He was subsequently tackled to the ground and tased. Brown was arrested on suspicion of resisting arrest, but the case was not referred to prosecutors after an internal review.

Four months later, the Milwaukee Police Department released the approximately 30-minute video taken by police body camera. After negative public reaction, the Milwaukee Police Chief Alfonso Morales indicated that the officers had been disciplined for acting "inappropriately". Brown called the incident "an attempt at police intimidation, followed by the unlawful use of physical force."

On May 4, 2021 in a 14–0 vote, the City of Milwaukee Common Council approved a $750,000 settlement with Sterling Brown over the 2018 incident with police. Although the settlement contained no admission of constitutional rights violations, it did contain an apology and recognition of an unnecessary escalation despite Brown's calm behavior. Officers involved in the action have been suspended, reassigned, and others required to undergo retraining. Moreover, the settlement called for a change in police tactics and institutes a set of anti-racist policing policies and procedures that discipline officers for violating civil and human rights. The settlement also includes a new requirement that officers log every event in which an officer draws a gun, personnel investigations for city police officers and a requirement to wear body cameras.

== Personal life ==
Sterling Brown is the younger brother of two-time NBA champion Shannon Brown.
