= Ty Jerome =

American basketball player (born 1997)

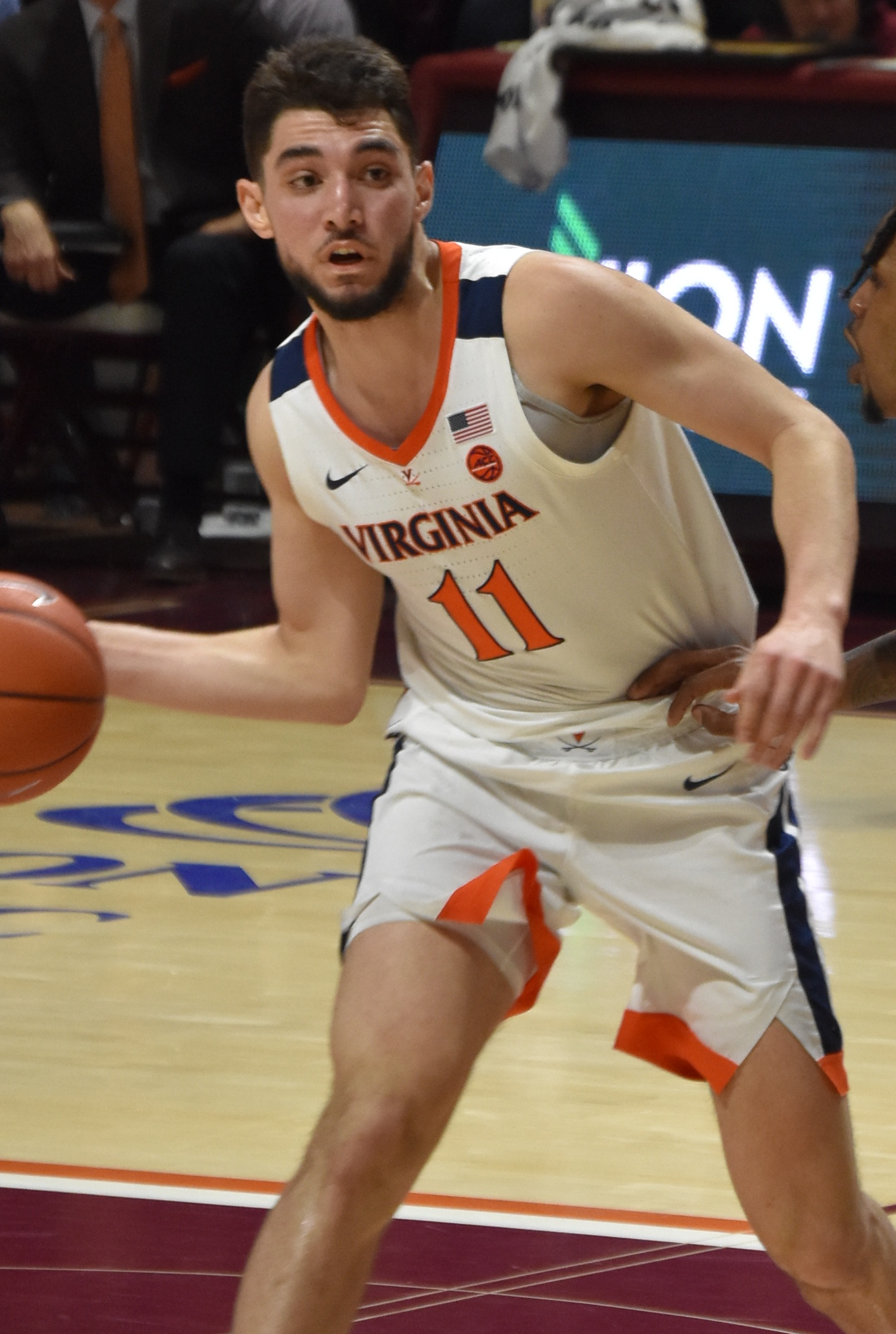
- Jerome with Virginia in 2019

No. 2 – Memphis Grizzlies
- Position: Point guard / shooting guard
- League: NBA

Personal information
- Born: July 8, 1997 (age 29) New York, New York, U.S.
- Listed height: 6 ft 5 in (1.96 m)
- Listed weight: 195 lb (88 kg)

Career information
- High school: Iona Prep (New Rochelle, New York)
- College: Virginia (2016–2019)
- NBA draft: 2019: 1st round, 24th overall pick
- Drafted by: Philadelphia 76ers
- Playing career: 2019–present

Career history
- 2019–2020: Phoenix Suns
- 2019–2020: →Northern Arizona Suns
- 2020–2022: Oklahoma City Thunder
- 2021: →Oklahoma City Blue
- 2022–2023: Golden State Warriors
- 2023–2025: Cleveland Cavaliers
- 2025–present: Memphis Grizzlies

Career highlights
- NCAA champion (2019); Second-team All-ACC (2019); Third-team All-ACC (2018)
- Stats at NBA.com
- Stats at Basketball Reference

Ty Jeremy Jerome (born July 8, 1997) is an American professional basketball player for the Memphis Grizzlies of the National Basketball Association (NBA). He played college basketball for the Virginia Cavaliers, where in 2019 he was the starting shooting guard on their national championship team. Jerome was drafted by the Philadelphia 76ers in the 2019 NBA draft but was traded to the Phoenix Suns. He has also played for the Oklahoma City Thunder, Golden State Warriors and Cleveland Cavaliers.

== Early years ==
During his early childhood, Jerome played for Riverside Church in AAU with Donovan Mitchell. Jerome played high school basketball at The Masters School in Dobbs Ferry, New York. He attended Iona Preparatory School in New Rochelle, New York for high school, playing varsity for all four years. After his junior season at Iona Prep, he was named first-team All-Conference, All-Metropolitan, and All-State. Jerome's senior season was cut short due to a hip injury. On September 2, 2014, Jerome committed to playing college basketball at the University of Virginia.

College recruiting
Name	Hometown	School	Height	Weight	Commit date
Ty Jerome; PG	New Rochelle, NY	Iona Prep	6 ft 5 in (1.96 m)	180 lb (82 kg)	September 2, 2014
Ty Jerome; PG	Recruit ratings: Scout: Rivals: 247Sports: ESPN: (87)				
Overall recruit ranking: Scout: 51 Rivals: 53 247Sports: 44 ESPN: 43
Note: In many cases, Scout, Rivals, 247Sports, On3, and ESPN may conflict in their listings of height and weight.; In these cases, the average was taken. ESPN grades are on a 100-point scale.; Sources: "Virginia 2016 Basketball Commitments". Rivals.; "2016 Virginia Commits". Scout.; "2016 Player Commits". ESPN.; "Scout.com Team Recruiting Rankings". Scout.; "2016 Team Ranking". Rivals.; "Virginia 2016 Basketball Commitments". 247Sports.

== College career ==
During his freshman year at Virginia, Jerome was the backup point guard to London Perrantes. Coming off the bench, he averaged 4.3 points, 1.6 rebounds, and 1.5 assists.

Jerome took over as the Cavaliers' starting point guard his sophomore year. On December 30, 2017, he put up a career-high 31 points against Boston College. His play during the season earned him a spot on the All-ACC Third Team.

Prior to the 2018–2019 season, Jerome was selected to the pre-season all-ACC Second Team. On February 4, 2019, Jerome was named as one of the ten finalists for the Bob Cousy Award, recognizing the nation's top college point guard. He was projected in most mock drafts as an early second-round pick in the 2019 NBA draft. Jerome averaged 13.6 points per game and 5.5 assists per game, helping lead Virginia to another #1 seed in the 2019 NCAA tournament. Virginia would win the 2019 Championship game 85–77 behind Jerome's 16 points, 8 assists, and 6 rebounds.

At the conclusion of the season, Jerome announced his intention to forgo his final season of collegiate eligibility and declare for the 2019 NBA draft while hiring an agent.

== Professional career ==
=== Phoenix Suns (2019–2020) ===
On June 20, 2019, the Philadelphia 76ers selected Jerome with the 24th pick in the 2019 NBA draft. His rights were later traded to the Boston Celtics alongside Philadelphia's 33rd pick for the draft rights to Matisse Thybulle before being traded to the Phoenix Suns alongside Aron Baynes for a future first round pick. Coincidentally, both players the Suns traded for were recruited out of high school and played their college basketball for Tony Bennett: Baynes at Washington State and Jerome at Virginia. On July 6, the Suns announced that they had signed Jerome. Before the start of the season, Jerome sprained his right ankle on October 21, leaving him out indefinitely. On November 25, Jerome was assigned to the Northern Arizona Suns. Jerome played the next day in a loss against the Iowa Wolves before being recalled by Phoenix on November 27. Jerome was assigned to Northern Arizona again on November 29 for a game against the Sioux Falls Skyforce before being recalled to Phoenix a day later.

Jerome made his NBA debut on December 2, 2019, in a 109–104 win over the Charlotte Hornets with four points, four assists, three rebounds, and three steals in 12 minutes of play. On December 21, Jerome scored a season-high 15 points on 6-of-8 shooting in a 139–125 loss to the Houston Rockets. Jerome was later assigned to the Northern Arizona Suns for a game on March 4 before returning to Phoenix a day later.

=== Oklahoma City Thunder (2020–2022) ===
On November 16, 2020, Jerome was traded to the Oklahoma City Thunder alongside Kelly Oubre Jr., Ricky Rubio, Jalen Lecque, and a 2022 first-round pick in exchange for Chris Paul and Abdel Nader. He was assigned to the Thunder's G League affiliate, the Oklahoma City Blue, still recovering from a severe left ankle sprain suffered a year earlier. He made his debut playing limited minutes for the Blue on February 11, 2021. Jerome made his Thunder debut in a game against the Atlanta Hawks on February 26. He finished the game with nine points, five rebounds, and seven assists in 22 minutes played in a 118–109 win over the Atlanta Hawks. His seven assists also set a record for the most assists in a debut in Thunder franchise history.

On March 8, 2022, Jerome underwent season-ending groin surgery.

On September 30, 2022, Jerome was traded, along with Derrick Favors, Maurice Harkless, Théo Maledon and a future second-round pick, to the Houston Rockets in exchange for David Nwaba, Sterling Brown, Trey Burke, and Marquese Chriss. The following day, he was waived.

=== Golden State Warriors (2022–2023) ===
Jerome was signed to the Golden State Warriors on October 4, 2022, for the rest of the preseason; then, he signed to a two-way contract to play along with the affiliate Santa Cruz Warriors of the NBA G League.

=== Cleveland Cavaliers (2023–2025) ===
Jerome in 2023

On July 6, 2023, Jerome signed with the Cleveland Cavaliers. He played in only 15 minutes across two games for Cleveland before suffering a right ankle impingement in an October 27 games against the Oklahoma City Thunder. On January 25, 2024, Jerome underwent successful right ankle surgery and missed the remainder of the season.

On November 20, 2024, Jerome scored 27 of a season-high 29 points in the first half of the Cavaliers' 128–100 win over the New Orleans Pelicans. On January 24, 2025, he would score a new career-high with 33 points made (including a perfect 8-of-8 shooting rate for three-point shots) off the bench in a 129–132 loss to the Philadelphia 76ers. Jerome ended up becoming the first Cavaliers player in franchise history to make eight three-pointers without missing a single attempt.

On April 19, 2025, Jerome made his playoff debut during the first round of the playoffs, scoring 28 points alongside five rebounds and three assists in a 121–100 Game 1 win over the Miami Heat.

=== Memphis Grizzlies (2025–present) ===
On July 14, 2025, Jerome signed a three-year, $28 million contract with the Memphis Grizzlies. On October 20, Jerome was ruled out for at least four weeks after suffering a high-grade right calf strain during a preseason game against the Miami Heat. On November 22, it was reported that he would miss another 6-to-9 weeks in recovery from the strain. On January 31, 2026, Jerome made his Grizzlies and season debut, scoring a team-high 20 points in a 131–114 loss to the Minnesota Timberwolves.

On October 21, 2026, during the Grizzlies’ season-opening 123–103 win over the Utah Jazz, Jerome scored a career-high 45 points alongside seven rebounds and six assists. On October 23, he recorded 28 points and five assists in a 111–108 win over the Golden State Warriors. On October 25, Jerome put up 31 points, four rebounds and seven assists in a 123–112 win over the Sacramento Kings. The next day, he was named the NBA's Western Conference Player of the Week after averaging 34.7 points per game as the NBA's leading scorer during the first week of games. On November 2, he recorded 40 points, five rebounds, five assists and two steals in a 135–134 loss to the New Orleans Pelicans.

== Career statistics ==
Legend
GP	Games played	GS	Games started	MPG	Minutes per game
FG%	Field goal percentage	3P%	3-point field goal percentage	FT%	Free throw percentage
RPG	Rebounds per game	APG	Assists per game	SPG	Steals per game
BPG	Blocks per game	PPG	Points per game	**Bold**	Career high

=== NBA ===
==== Regular season ====
Year	Team	GP	GS	MPG	FG%	3P%	FT%	RPG	APG	SPG	BPG	PPG
2019–20	Phoenix	31	0	10.6	.336	.280	.750	1.5	1.4	.5	.1	3.3
2020–21	Oklahoma City	33	1	**23.9**	.446	.423	.765	**2.8**	3.6	.6	.2	10.7
2021–22	Oklahoma City	48	4	16.7	.378	.290	.809	1.6	2.3	.6	.1	7.1
2022–23	Golden State	45	2	18.1	.488	.389	**.927**	1.7	3.0	.5	.1	6.9
2023–24	Cleveland	2	0	7.4	.500	.000	—	.5	1.5	.0	.0	2.0
2024–25	Cleveland	**70**	3	19.9	**.516**	**.439**	.872	2.5	3.4	**1.1**	.0	12.5
2025–26	Memphis	15	**15**	22.6	.474	.420	.875	**2.8**	**5.7**	**1.1**	**.3**	**19.7**
Career		244	25	18.4	.460	.386	.854	2.1	3.0	.7	.1	9.3

==== Playoffs ====
Year	Team	GP	GS	MPG	FG%	3P%	FT%	RPG	APG	SPG	BPG	PPG
2025	Cleveland	9	1	21.2	.402	.389	.850	2.4	3.6	.6	.1	11.7
Career		9	1	21.2	.402	.389	.850	2.4	3.6	.6	.1	11.7

=== College ===
Year	Team	GP	GS	MPG	FG%	3P%	FT%	RPG	APG	SPG	BPG	PPG
2016–17	Virginia	34	5	13.9	**.473**	.397	.778	1.6	1.5	.4	**.1**	4.3
2017–18	Virginia	34	34	30.8	.421	.379	**.905**	3.1	3.9	**1.6**	.0	10.6
2018–19	Virginia	**37**	**37**	**33.9**	.435	**.399**	.736	**4.2**	**5.5**	1.5	.0	**13.6**
Career		105	76	26.4	.435	.392	.788	3.0	3.7	1.2	.0	9.6

== Personal life ==
Jerome's parents are Mark Jerome and Melanie Walker. He has two brothers and two sisters, including Kobe, who played college basketball at UC Riverside from 2021–2023, and at Delaware from 2023–2025. His mother is white, and his father is half African American and half white; both played college basketball. His mother played at Brandeis and his father played at Lafayette. His paternal grandmother was active in the 1954-1968 Civil Rights Movement with the Congress of Racial Equality, while her husband Fred was a photographer who covered the movement.

Jerome majored in American Studies while at the University of Virginia. His favorite player in the NBA growing up was Steve Nash.
