= Kenyon Martin Jr. =

American basketball player (born 2001)

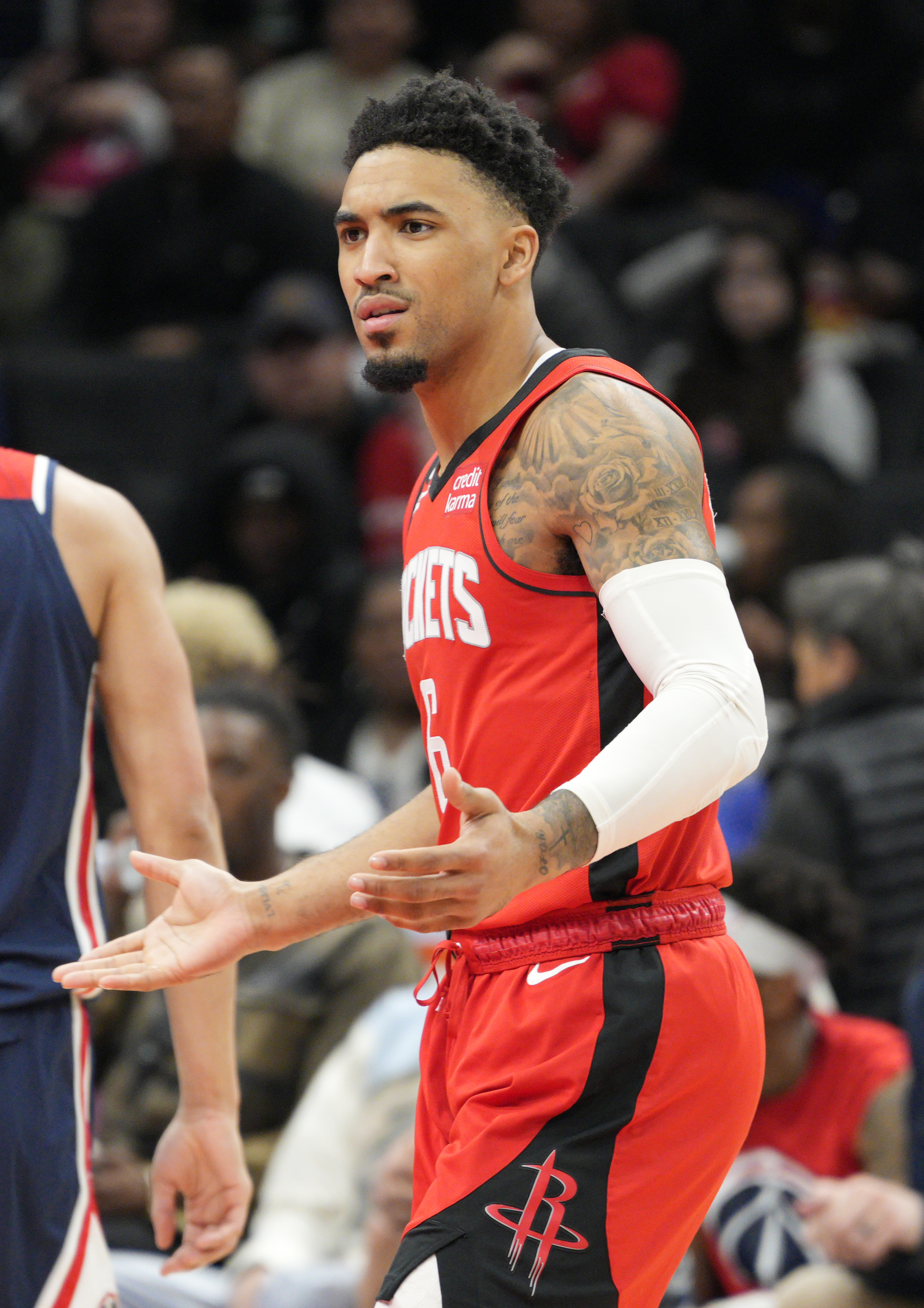
- Martin with the Houston Rockets in 2023

No. 00 – Iowa Wolves
- Position: Small forward / power forward
- League: NBA G League

Personal information
- Born: January 6, 2001 (age 25) Los Angeles, California, U.S.
- Listed height: 6 ft 6 in (1.98 m)
- Listed weight: 215 lb (98 kg)

Career information
- High school: Chaminade College Prep (Los Angeles, California); Sierra Canyon (Chatsworth, California); IMG Academy (Bradenton, Florida)
- NBA draft: 2020: 2nd round, 52nd overall pick
- Drafted by: Sacramento Kings
- Playing career: 2020–present

Career history
- 2020–2023: Houston Rockets
- 2021: →Rio Grande Valley Vipers
- 2023: Los Angeles Clippers
- 2023–2025: Philadelphia 76ers
- 2025: Utah Jazz
- 2025–2026: Ningbo Rockets
- 2026–present: Iowa Wolves

Career highlights
- NBA G League All-Rookie Team (2021)
- Stats at NBA.com
- Stats at Basketball Reference

Kenyon Lee "KJ" Martin Jr. (born January 6, 2001) is an American professional basketball player for the Iowa Wolves of the NBA G League. The son of former NBA player Kenyon Martin, he grew up in southern California and played basketball while attending Chaminade College Prep and Sierra Canyon before going to IMG Academy for his postgraduate year. He was selected by the Sacramento Kings in the second round of the 2020 NBA draft.

In November 2020, the Kings traded Martin to the Houston Rockets, where he played for three seasons. During the 2023 off-season, he was traded to the Los Angeles Clippers. In November 2023, after just 2 games with the Clippers, he was traded to the Philadelphia 76ers; in February 2025 he was traded to the Detroit Pistons, who then immediately sent him to the Utah Jazz.

== High school career ==
Kenyon Martin Jr attended Oaks Christian School as a freshman but did not play basketball that year. Early in the school year, Kenyon Martin Jr was pulled out of Oaks Christian to be homeschooled. After his freshman year, he was enrolled in Chaminade College Preparatory where he started playing basketball as a sophomore.

A three-star recruit from Sierra Canyon School in Chatsworth, California, Martin played alongside Scotty Pippen Jr. and Cassius Stanley. Martin averaged 16.7 points and 9.8 rebounds per game for the back-to-back California Open Division champions.

Martin originally committed to play collegiately for Vanderbilt before opting for a postgraduate year at IMG Academy. He averaged 20 points and eight rebounds per game at IMG Academy, drawing praise for his athleticism. Martin scored 37 points at the National Prep Showcase and demonstrated an improved jump shot. Martin declared for the 2020 NBA draft on March 24, 2020.

== Professional career ==
=== Houston Rockets (2020–2023) ===
==== 2020-21 ====
On November 18, 2020, Martin was selected by the Sacramento Kings in the second round of the 2020 NBA draft with the 52nd overall pick. On November 25, he was traded to the Houston Rockets in exchange for cash considerations and a future second-round pick. Martin signed a four-year contract with the Rockets on November 30. The Rockets organization put him on their G League affiliate team, the Rio Grande Valley Vipers.

Martin was activated by the Houston Rockets for the January 4, 2021, game against the Dallas Mavericks, then was inactive for one game before making his on-court NBA debut on January 8, 2021, vs. the Orlando Magic, scoring 7 points on 3-3 shooting (including a three-pointer)

On May 8, 2021, Martin scored a season career-high 27 points against the Utah Jazz. He had a then-career high 10 rebounds in three different games, all in May 2021.

==== 2021-22 ====
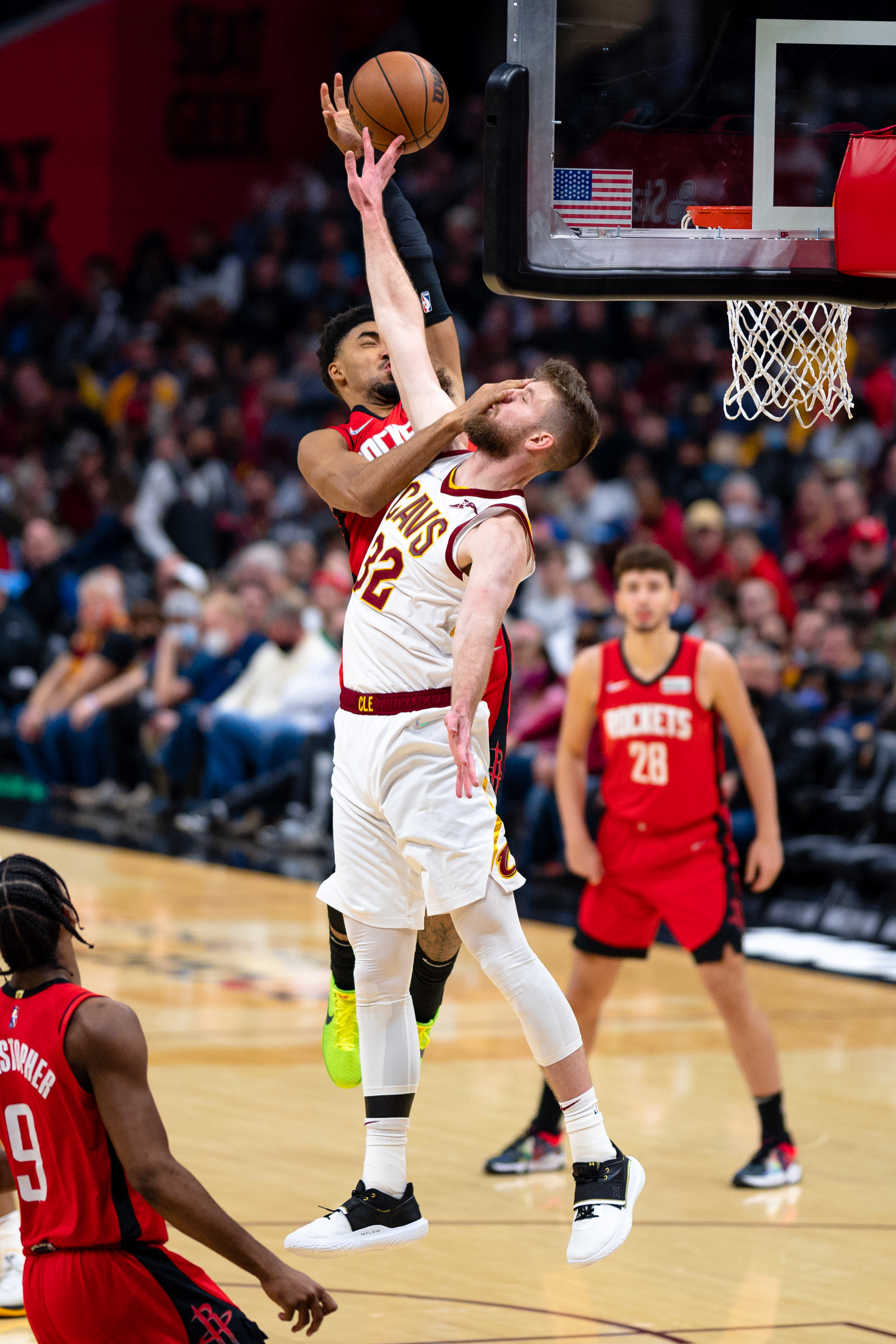
Martin attempts to dunk over Dean Wade of the Cleveland Cavaliers in 2021

Martin played in 79 of 82 games during the season, starting two. He scored a season-high 20 points on March 2, 2022, against the Utah Jazz and twice snared 11 rebounds in a game.

==== 2022-23 ====
Before the season, Martin made a trade request to the Rockets with the desire of playing more minutes. He instead became a full-time starter when Eric Gordon was traded in February 2023. Martin played in all 82 of the Rockets' games, starting 49 of them in his third season in the NBA. He also achieved career highs in points per game (12.7), field goal percentage (.572), rebounds per game (5.5), and minutes per game (28.0).

On November 25, 2022, he scored 21 points along with a career-high 15 rebounds in a 128–122 win against the Atlanta Hawks.

On March 22, 2023, Martin scored a career-high 31 points, shooting 12-18 from the field against the Memphis Grizzlies.

On February 18, 2023, he was one of four participants in the AT&T Slam Dunk Contest on all-star weekend.

=== Los Angeles Clippers (2023) ===
On July 8, 2023, the Rockets traded Martin to the Los Angeles Clippers for two future second-round picks.

=== Philadelphia 76ers (2023–2025) ===
On November 1, 2023, the Philadelphia 76ers acquired Martin, Marcus Morris Sr., Nicolas Batum and Robert Covington from the Clippers in exchange for James Harden, P. J. Tucker, and Filip Petrušev. As part of the trade, the Clippers dealt a first-round pick, two second-round picks, a pick swap, and cash considerations to the 76ers, while sending a pick swap and cash considerations to the Oklahoma City Thunder. On July 15, 2024, he re-signed with the Sixers on a two-year, $16 million contract.

=== Utah Jazz (2025) ===
On February 6, 2025, Martin and two future second-round picks (2027 via Milwaukee; 2031 via Dallas) were traded to the Detroit Pistons. Several hours later, he was traded to the Utah Jazz in a five-team trade, including Jimmy Butler to the Warriors. Martin made 19 appearances (nine starts) for the Jazz, averaging 6.3 points, 2.8 rebounds, and 1.5 assists. On September 23, Martin was waived by the Jazz.

=== Ningbo Rockets (2025–2026) ===
On November 15, 2025, Martin signed with the Ningbo Rockets of the Chinese Basketball Association.

On September 27, 2026, the Minnesota Timberwolves announced Martin as part of their training camp roster. On October 17, 2026, Martin was waived.

== Career statistics ==
Legend
GP	Games played	GS	Games started	MPG	Minutes per game
FG%	Field goal percentage	3P%	3-point field goal percentage	FT%	Free throw percentage
RPG	Rebounds per game	APG	Assists per game	SPG	Steals per game
BPG	Blocks per game	PPG	Points per game	**Bold**	Career high

=== NBA ===
==== Regular season ====
Year	Team	GP	GS	MPG	FG%	3P%	FT%	RPG	APG	SPG	BPG	PPG
2020–21	Houston	45	8	23.7	.509	.365	.714	5.4	1.1	.7	**.9**	9.3
2021–22	Houston	79	2	21.0	.533	.357	.634	3.8	1.3	.4	.5	8.8
2022–23	Houston	**82**	**49**	**28.0**	.569	.315	.680	**5.5**	**1.5**	.5	.4	**12.7**
2023–24	L.A. Clippers	2	0	15.7	.400	.200	.500	1.5	.5	**1.0**	.5	5.0
2023–24	Philadelphia	58	2	12.3	.544	.304	.538	2.2	.9	.3	.2	3.7
2024–25	Philadelphia	24	7	20.0	**.616**	**.381**	**.828**	3.0	.8	.5	.7	6.4
2024–25	Utah	19	9	22.7	.490	.189	.722	2.8	**1.5**	.3	.3	6.3
Career		309	77	21.6	.545	.329	.673	4.0	1.2	.5	.5	8.6

== Personal life ==
Martin is the son of Kenyon Martin, who was selected first overall in the 2000 NBA draft and played in the NBA for 15 years, and Heather Martin.
