= Sara Kenyon =

British midwife and academic

Sara Kenyon MBE
- Born: Long Eaton
- Education: University of Leicester; De Montfort University; King's College London
- Scientific career
- Workplaces: University of Birmingham; University of Nottingham
- Thesis: Researching pre-term birth : the oracle trial and children study (2009)

Sara Kenyon is a British midwife who is a professor of evidence-based maternity care at the University of Birmingham. Kenyon has dedicated her career to maternal health and improving the clinical outcomes of new families and babies. She works at the Birmingham Women's Hospital and co-developed the Birmingham Symptom Specific Obstetric Triage System.

== Early life and education ==
Kenyon is from Long Eaton. Kenyon trained as a midwife at King's College London in 1980. She has said that she chose to study there because it was on the 185 bus route. She went to the ultrasound department at Dulwich Community Hospital, where she pioneered midwives doing ultrasound scans. This involved launching an ultrasound course at King's. She started a programme to support women through antenatal testing, "Antenatal Results and Choices", which has been running for over three decades. She moved to Nottingham, where she worked on the ORACLE trials, randomised control trials that proposed broad-spectrum antibiotics for women with PPROM or SPL. Her results showed that erythromycin improved neonatal outcomes. Kenyon completed an MSc in Applied Health Studies at De Montfort University, and was awarded a doctorate from the University of Leicester for her comprehensive research programme. Her doctoral research investigated pre-term births.

== Research and career ==
In 2009, Kenyon joined the University of Birmingham, where she was made professor of evidence-based maternity care. At Birmingham, Kenyon develops strategies to improve maternity care, and the outcomes of mothers and babies. She leads the West Midlands Applied Health Collaboration. Kenyon has led research trials and influenced policy.

Kenyon was instrumental in establishing the Birmingham Symptom Specific Obstetric Triage System. The BSOTS involves a triage of women who present with unexpected problems, a process to determine the clinical urgency, and overall improvement of care. BSOTS was adopted by over one hundred NHS trusts. She studied the dose regimen of syntocinon for women who have not given birth before.

Kenyon was appointed a Member of the British Empire in the 2024 New Year Honours. That year she was also honoured by the University of Birmingham as a recipient of the Rose Sidgwick Award for External Engagement.

== Selected publications ==
- Sara Kenyon; Michel Boulvain; James P Neilson (22 April 2003). "Antibiotics for preterm rupture of membranes". Cochrane Database of Systematic Reviews (2) CD001058. doi:10.1002/14651858.cd001058. ISSN 1469-493X. PMID 12804398. Wikidata Q24248762.
- S L Kenyon; D J Taylor; W Tarnow-Mordi; ORACLE Collaborative Group (1 March 2001). "Broad-spectrum antibiotics for preterm, prelabour rupture of fetal membranes: the ORACLE I randomised trial. ORACLE Collaborative Group". The Lancet. 357 (9261): 979–988. doi:10.1016/s0140-6736(00)04233-1. ISSN 0140-6736. PMID 11293640. Wikidata Q43568763.
- Beck Taylor; Catherine Henshall; Sara Kenyon; Ian Litchfield; Sheila Greenfield (8 October 2018). "Can rapid approaches to qualitative analysis deliver timely, valid findings to clinical leaders? A mixed methods study comparing rapid and thematic analysis". BMJ Open. 8 (10) e019993. doi:10.1136/bmjopen-2017-019993. ISSN 2044-6055. PMC 6194404. PMID 30297341. Wikidata Q57293619.
