= Kinyon =

Kinyon may refer to:

- Kinyon, California, former name of White Horse, California
- Jon Kinyon (born 1962), American filmmaker and songwriter
- William R. Kinyon (1833–1904), American politician
