= Arthur Kenyon (footballer) =

English footballer

Personal information
- Full name: Arthur Kenyon
- Date of birth: 1 December 1867
- Place of birth: Birmingham, England
- Date of death: 1895 (aged 27–28)
- Position: Goalkeeper

Senior career*
Years	Team	Apps	(Gls)
1891–1892	Birmingham St George's		
1892–1894	Darwen	46	(0)
1894	Worcester Rovers		
Total		46	(0)
- * Club domestic league appearances and goals

Arthur Kenyon (1 December 1867 – 1895) was an English footballer who played in the Football League for Darwen.
