= Kenyon Peard =

Rear-Admiral Sir Kenyon Harry Terrell Peard, KBE (1 June 1902 – 14 April 1994) was a senior Royal Navy officer.

== Career ==
Born in Croydon, Surrey, on 1 June 1902, Kenyon Harry Terrell Peard was the son of Henry T. Peard.

Peard studied at the Royal Naval Colleges Osborne and Dartmouth after joining the Royal Navy as a cadet in 1916. He joined HMS Cumberland in 1919, before serving on HMS Clematis and HMS Royal Sovereign as a Lieutenant from 1923 to 1929, the year he qualified in the Navy's Torpedo Branch, which was responsible for electrics. He then served aboard HMS Eagle, HMS Vernon and HMS Hawkins, before his appointment as Fleet Torpedo Officer to the China Station in 1935; three years later, he was promoted to Commander and joined HMS Cleopatra. Peard then joined the torpedo school HMS Defiance and then served aboard HMS Norfolk as the executive officer during the Battle of North Cape in 1943. With the Second World War over, Peard was transferred to the Navy's Electrical Branch on its formation in 1946 and served at the electrical training school HMS Collingwood for a year, before taking over the command of HMS Ariel, the air electrical school. In 1949, he was appointed Deputy Director (Personnel) of the Naval Electrical Department, and four years later took command of HMS Collingwood. In 1955, he was appointed to Rear-Admiral and became Director of the Naval Electrical Department, serving until his retirement in 1958.

According to The Telegraph, Peard "played a key role in the post-war revolution in electrical engineering", which included the introduction of electrically operated weaponry and electrified galleys. He had been appointed a Commander of the Order of the British Empire in 1951 and was promoted to Knight Commander on his retirement in 1958. He died on 14 April 1994, leaving a widow Mercy Leila (née Bone) and two children Robin and Gillian, and 4 grandchildren.

== Likenesses ==
- Black and white photograph in "Rear Adml Sir Kenyon Peard", The Daily Telegraph, 9 May 1994, p. 23.

Military offices
Preceded by Rear-Adm Philip Clarke	Director, Naval Electrical Branch; 1955–1958	Succeeded by Rear-Adm Kenneth Buckley
