= Christian Wood =

American basketball player (born 1995)

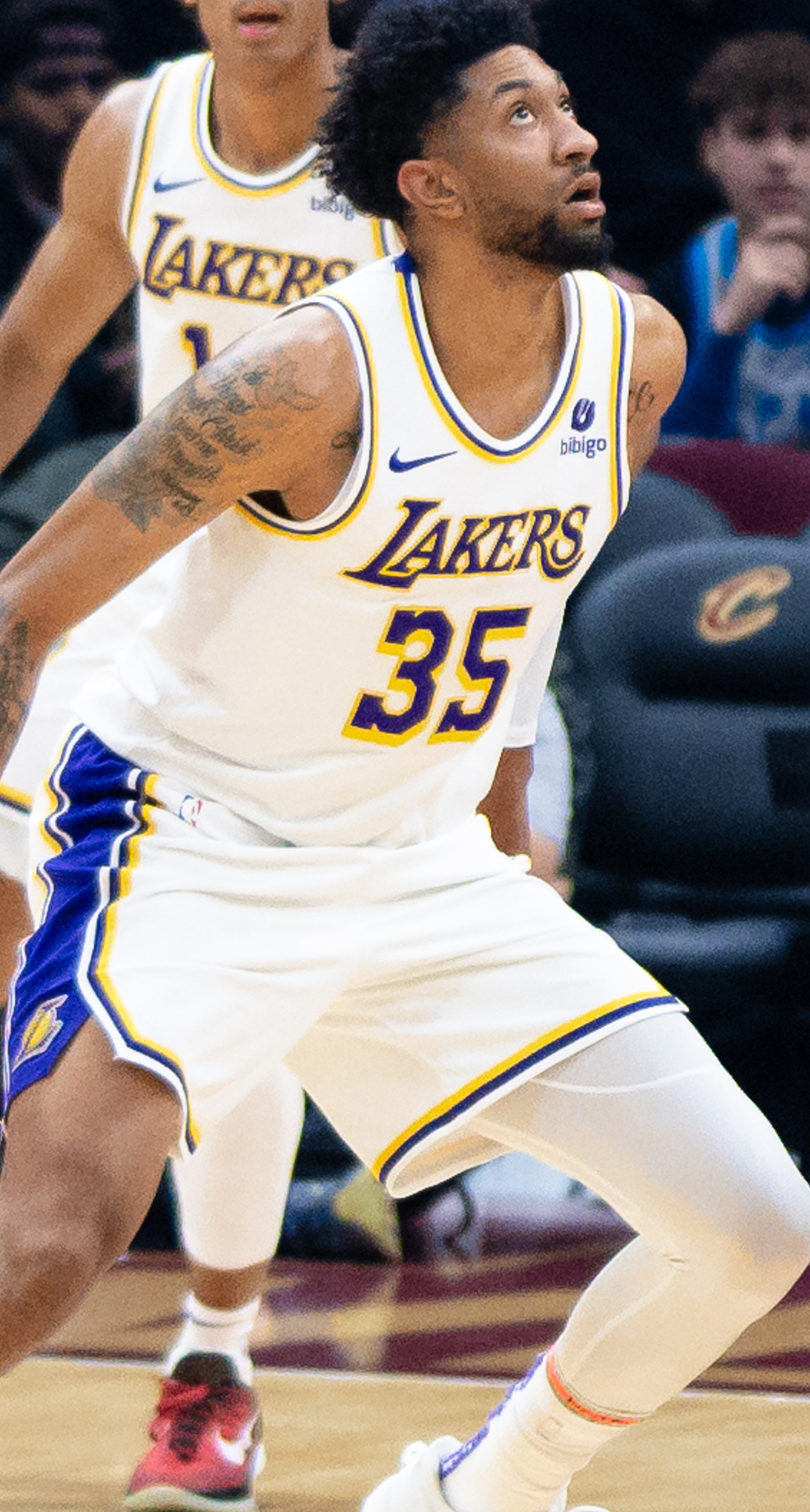
- Wood with the Los Angeles Lakers in 2023

Free agent
- Position: Power forward

Personal information
- Born: September 27, 1995 (age 31) Long Beach, California, U.S.
- Listed height: 6 ft 8 in (2.03 m)
- Listed weight: 214 lb (97 kg)

Career information
- High school: Los Alamitos (Los Alamitos, California); Knight (Palmdale, California); Findlay (Henderson, Nevada)
- College: UNLV (2013–2015)
- NBA draft: 2015: undrafted
- Playing career: 2015–present

Career history
- 2015–2016: Philadelphia 76ers
- 2015–2016: →Delaware 87ers
- 2016–2017: Charlotte Hornets
- 2016–2017: →Greensboro Swarm
- 2017–2018: Delaware 87ers
- 2018–2019: Milwaukee Bucks
- 2018–2019: →Wisconsin Herd
- 2019: New Orleans Pelicans
- 2019–2020: Detroit Pistons
- 2020–2022: Houston Rockets
- 2022–2023: Dallas Mavericks
- 2023–2025: Los Angeles Lakers

Career highlights
- NBA Cup champion (2023); All-NBA G League Second Team (2018); All-NBA G League Third Team (2019); First-team All-MWC (2015)
- Stats at NBA.com
- Stats at Basketball Reference

Christian Marquise Wood (born September 27, 1995) is an American professional basketball player who last played for the Los Angeles Lakers of the National Basketball Association (NBA). He played college basketball for the UNLV Runnin' Rebels. He has also played in the NBA for the Philadelphia 76ers, Charlotte Hornets, Milwaukee Bucks, New Orleans Pelicans, Detroit Pistons, Houston Rockets and the Dallas Mavericks.

== Early life ==
Wood was born and raised in Long Beach, California.

== High school career ==
Wood originally attended Los Alamitos High School for his first year of high school. He moved and transferred to Knight High School in Palmdale, California for one year before transferring to Findlay Prep in Henderson, Nevada prior to his senior year. In Findlay, he helped the Pilots win 54 consecutive games and an ESPN National High School Invitational championship in 2012. Wood was ranked as the No. 36 overall player in the class of 2013 (no. 8 at his position) by Rivals, Scout listed him at No. 10 at his position and ESPN listed him as the No. 71 prospect overall.

== College career ==
Wood played at UNLV from 2013 to 2015. As a freshman, he played in 30 games with two starts and averaged 4.5 points and 3.2 rebounds per game. As a sophomore, he played in 33 games and averaged 15.7 points, 10 rebounds and 2.7 blocks per game, earning first team All-Mountain West honors. After the season, Wood declared for the 2015 NBA draft.

== Professional career ==
=== Philadelphia 76ers (2015–2016) ===
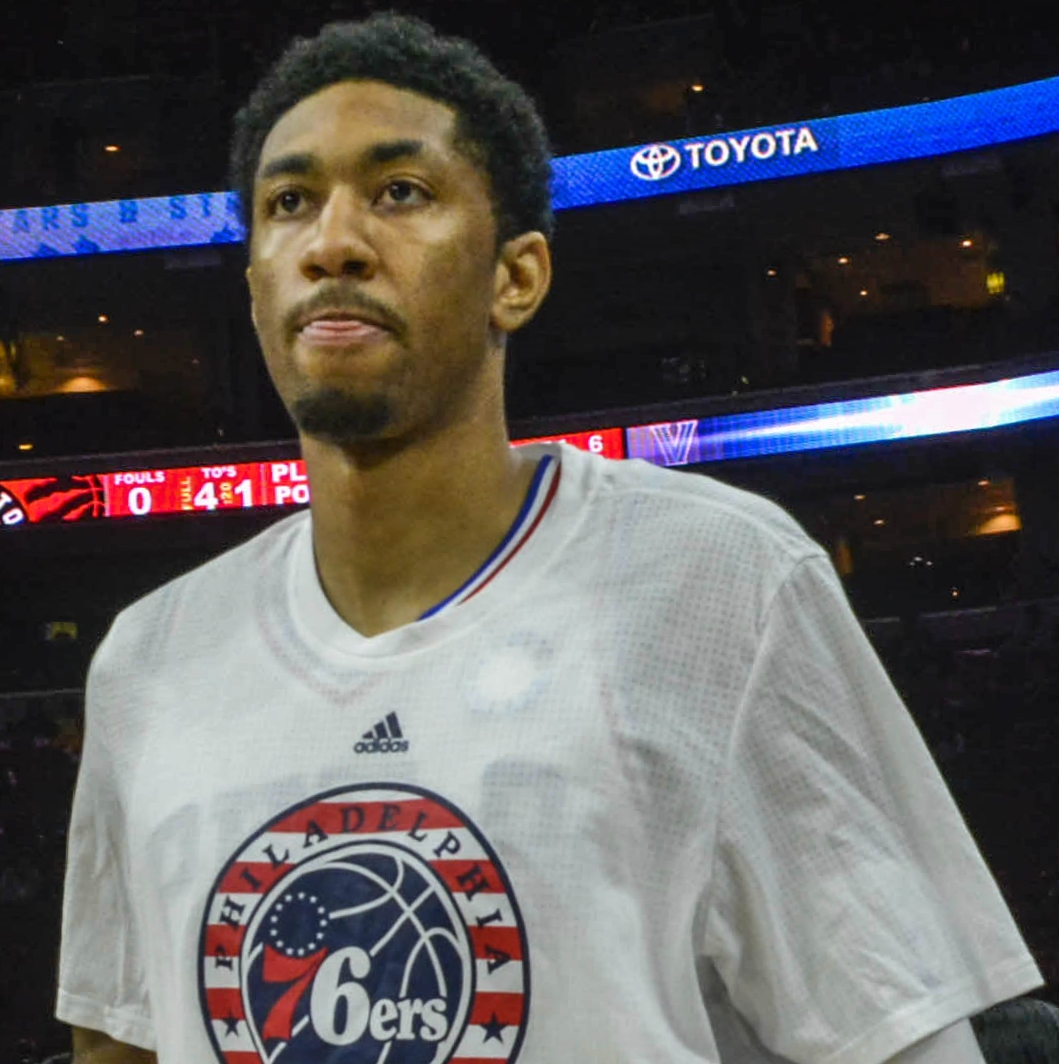
Wood with the Philadelphia 76ers in 2015

Wood was originally projected to be drafted late in the first round before his stock dropped, which led to more consistent second round projections. Wood ultimately went undrafted in the 2015 NBA draft, and subsequently joined the Houston Rockets for the 2015 NBA Summer League. On September 27, 2015, he signed with the Philadelphia 76ers. On October 28, he made his debut for the 76ers, recording two rebounds in five minutes off the bench in a loss to the Boston Celtics. During his rookie season, he had multiple assignments with the Delaware 87ers of the NBA Development League. On January 4, 2016, he was waived by the 76ers.

=== Delaware 87ers (2016) ===
On January 6, 2016, Wood was acquired by the Delaware 87ers. On March 4, he returned to the 76ers, signing a 10-day contract with the team. However, his stint lasted just three days as he was waived by the 76ers on March 7. Two days later, he was reacquired by Delaware.

=== Return to Philadelphia (2016) ===
Wood was called up again on March 27, signing another 10-day contract with the 76ers. On April 7, he signed with the 76ers for the rest of the season.

In July 2016, Wood re-joined the 76ers for the 2016 NBA Summer League.

=== Charlotte Hornets (2016–2017) ===
On July 14, 2016, Wood signed with the Charlotte Hornets. On November 7, he made his debut for the Hornets in a 122–100 win over the Indiana Pacers, recording two rebounds in three minutes off the bench. During his sophomore season, he had multiple assignments with the Greensboro Swarm of the NBA Development League.

=== Return to Delaware (2017–2018) ===
After his second season in the NBA, Wood entered free agency due to his second year being a team option. Wood would later join the Dallas Mavericks and Phoenix Suns for the 2017 NBA Summer League in Orlando and Las Vegas, respectively. Wood was a member of the Mavericks team that won the Summer League Championship in Orlando that year.

On August 9, 2017, Wood signed with the Fujian Sturgeons of the Chinese Basketball Association. However, Wood never played a game for Fujian as he was waived by the team, which allowed him to return to the Delaware 87ers that same year.

=== Milwaukee Bucks (2018–2019) ===
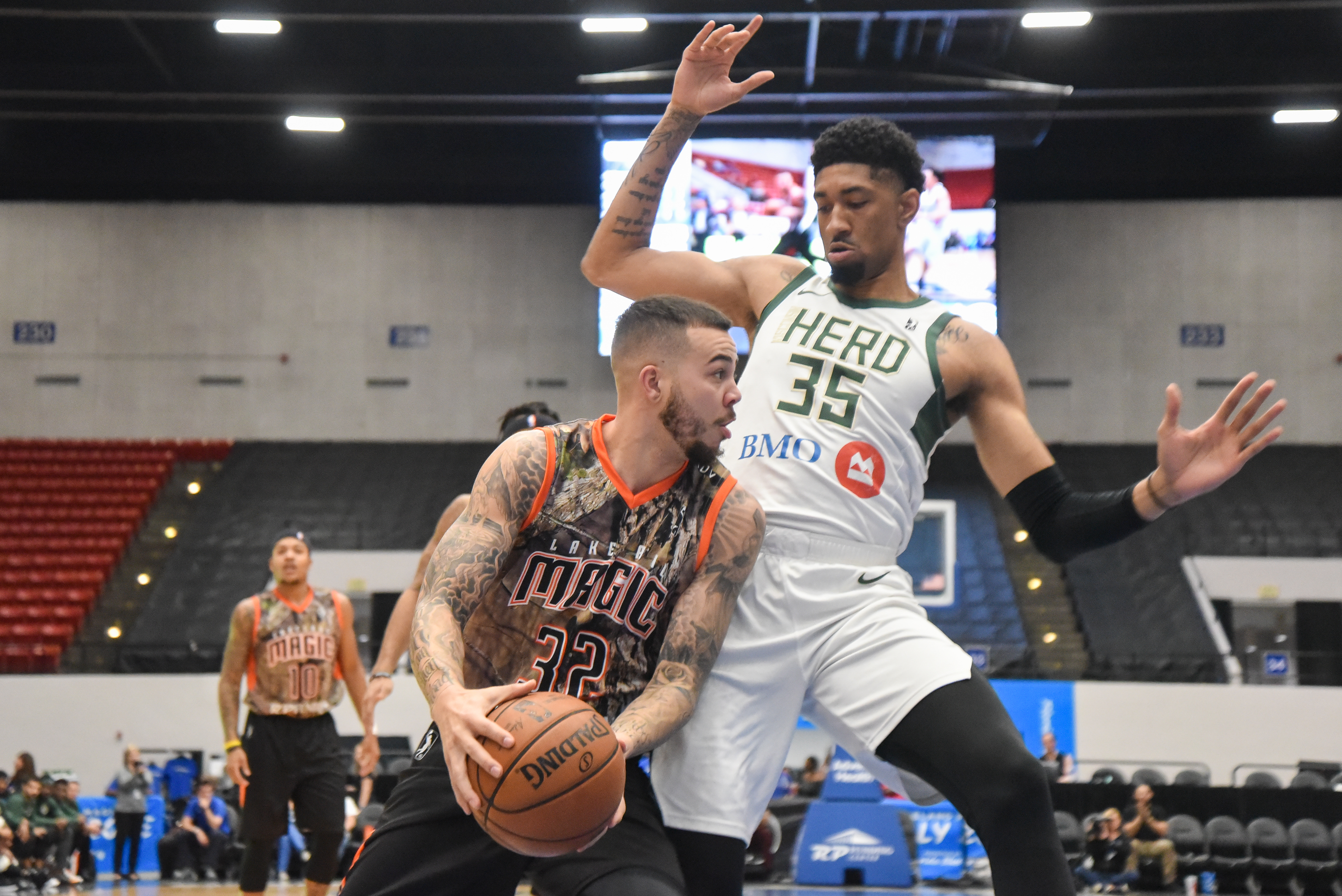
Wood (35) with the Wisconsin Herd

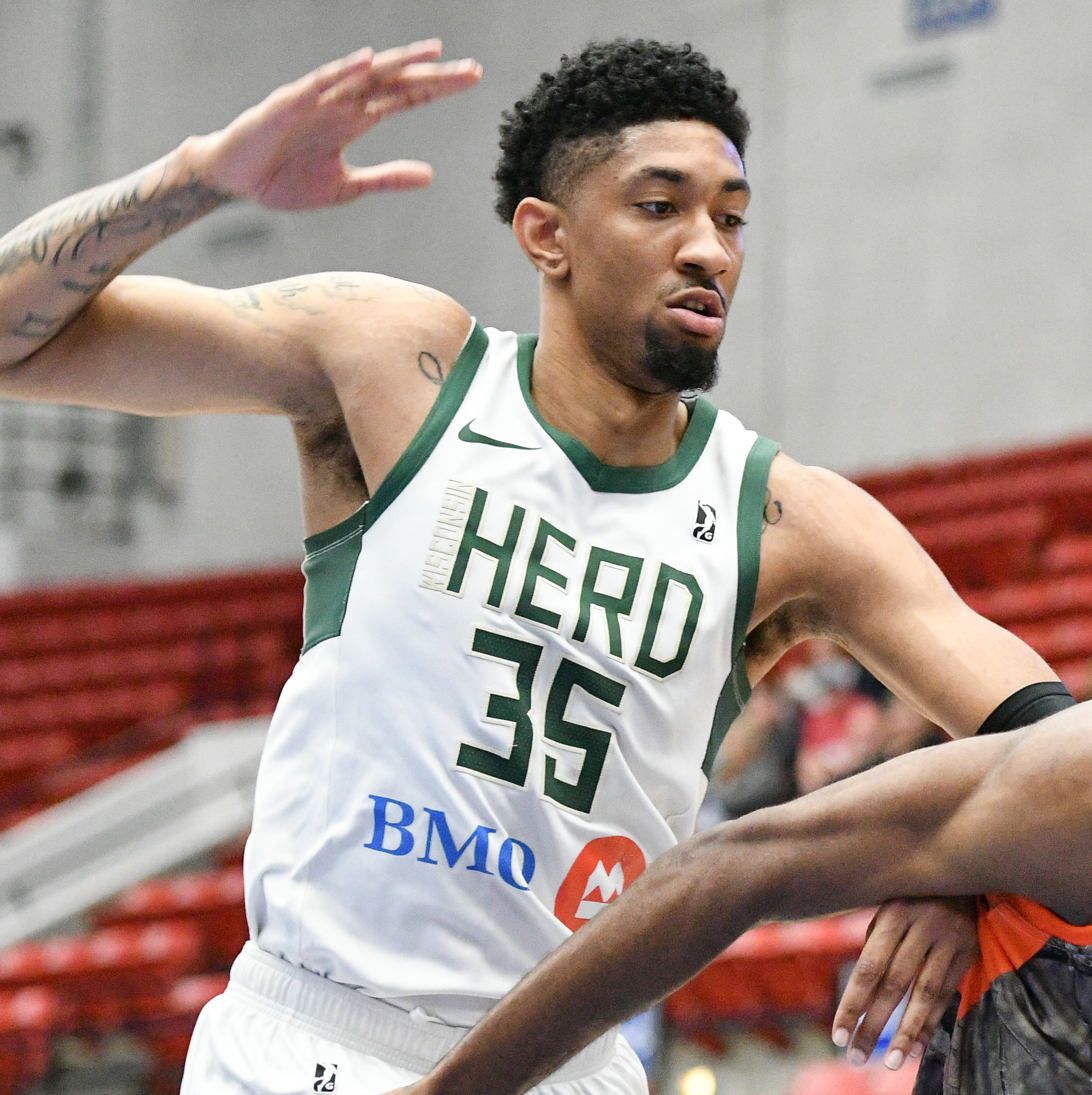
Wood in 2019

On August 14, 2018, Wood was signed by the Milwaukee Bucks. On March 18, 2019, Wood was waived by the Bucks.

=== New Orleans Pelicans (2019) ===
On March 20, 2019, Wood was claimed off waivers by the New Orleans Pelicans.

Given Nikola Mirotić's departure, and Anthony Davis expressing his desire to be traded and subsequent reduction in playing time and occasional rest, Wood had an opportunity to get substantial minutes for the first time in his career. On March 24, he made his debut with 7 points in 8 minutes of playing time. On March 26, he put up 23 points, nine rebounds, six blocks, three steals and an assist in over 32 minutes in the Pelicans' loss to the Hawks. He was waived by the Pelicans on July 15, 2019.

=== Detroit Pistons (2019–2020) ===
Wood was claimed off waivers by the Detroit Pistons on July 17, 2019.

On March 14, 2020, Wood was reported to have tested positive for COVID-19 amidst the pandemic and the subsequent suspension of the season. He had 30 points and 11 rebounds against Rudy Gobert, who was the first player to test positive, and the Utah Jazz on March 7.

=== Houston Rockets (2020–2022) ===
On November 24, 2020, Wood was signed to a three-year, $41-million contract by the Pistons and traded to the Houston Rockets in exchange for Trevor Ariza, the draft rights to Isaiah Stewart, a future second-round pick, and cash considerations. On December 26, 2020, Wood made his Rockets debut, putting up 31 points, 13 rebounds, three assists, and one block in a 128–126 overtime loss to the Portland Trail Blazers. During a road trip game win against the Memphis Grizzlies, Wood suffered a right ankle injury and left the arena in the third quarter. Without Wood, the Rockets were vulnerable and lost 17 straight games.

On January 3, 2022, the Rockets suspended Wood for one game without pay for poor behavior. On March 21, Wood recorded a career-high 39 points on a career-high eight three-pointers made in a 115–97 win over the Washington Wizards. On March 29, he was ruled out for the remainder of the season with a hamstring injury.

=== Dallas Mavericks (2022–2023) ===
On June 24, 2022, Wood was traded to the Dallas Mavericks in exchange for Boban Marjanović, Trey Burke, Marquese Chriss, Sterling Brown, and the draft rights to Wendell Moore Jr. Wood became the first player in franchise history to score at least 25 points each in his first two games.

On December 25, 2022, in his first Christmas Day game, Wood recorded 30 points, 8 rebounds, 7 assists, 4 steals and 2 blocks in a 124–115 victory over the Los Angeles Lakers.

=== Los Angeles Lakers (2023–2025) ===
On September 6, 2023, Wood signed with the Los Angeles Lakers. He averaged 6.9 points and 5.1 rebounds in 50 games in 2023–24, but was sidelined the last two months with a left knee injury. He had an initial arthroscopic procedure in March 2024. After exercising his $3 million player option to return for another season, Wood had arthroscopic surgery on his knee again in September. On February 11, 2025, Wood was waived by the Lakers when they signed Alex Len.

== Career statistics ==
Legend
GP	Games played	GS	Games started	MPG	Minutes per game
FG%	Field goal percentage	3P%	3-point field goal percentage	FT%	Free throw percentage
RPG	Rebounds per game	APG	Assists per game	SPG	Steals per game
BPG	Blocks per game	PPG	Points per game	**Bold**	Career high

=== NBA ===
==== Regular season ====
Year	Team	GP	GS	MPG	FG%	3P%	FT%	RPG	APG	SPG	BPG	PPG
2015–16	Philadelphia	17	0	8.5	.415	.364	.619	2.2	.2	.3	.4	3.6
2016–17	Charlotte	13	0	8.2	.522	.000	.733	2.2	.2	.2	.5	2.7
2018–19	Milwaukee	13	0	4.7	.480	**.600**	.667	1.5	.2	.0	.0	2.8
2018–19	New Orleans	8	2	23.6	.533	.286	.756	7.9	.8	**.9**	**1.3**	16.9
2019–20	Detroit	62	12	21.4	**.567**	.386	.744	6.3	1.0	.5	.9	13.1
2020–21	Houston	41	41	**32.3**	.514	.374	.631	9.6	1.7	.8	1.2	**21.0**
2021–22	Houston	**68**	**67**	30.8	.501	.390	.623	**10.1**	**2.3**	.8	1.0	17.9
2022–23	Dallas	67	17	25.9	.515	.376	**.772**	7.3	1.8	.4	1.1	16.6
2023–24	L.A. Lakers	50	1	17.4	.466	.307	.702	5.1	1.0	.3	.7	6.9
Career		339	140	23.2	.514	.372	.694	7.0	1.4	.5	.9	13.6
