= Eric Gordon =

American-Bahamian basketball player (born 1988)

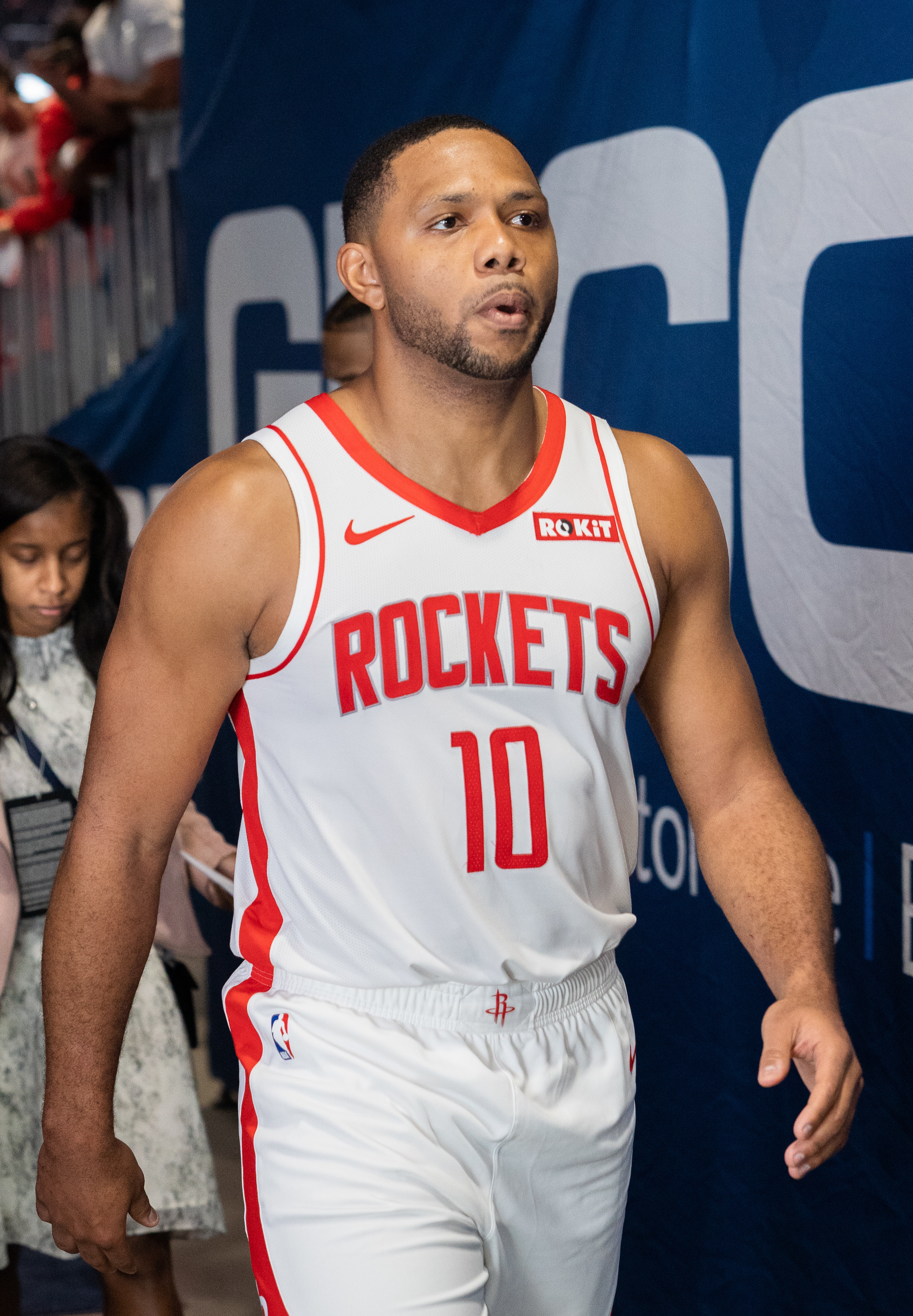
- Gordon with the Houston Rockets in 2019

Free agent
- Position: Shooting guard

Personal information
- Born: December 25, 1988 (age 37) Indianapolis, Indiana, U.S.
- Listed height: 6 ft 3 in (1.91 m)
- Listed weight: 215 lb (98 kg)

Career information
- High school: North Central (Indianapolis, Indiana)
- College: Indiana (2007–2008)
- NBA draft: 2008: 1st round, 7th overall pick
- Drafted by: Los Angeles Clippers
- Playing career: 2008–present

Career history
- 2008–2011: Los Angeles Clippers
- 2011–2016: New Orleans Hornets / Pelicans
- 2016–2023: Houston Rockets
- 2023: Los Angeles Clippers
- 2023–2024: Phoenix Suns
- 2024–2026: Philadelphia 76ers

Career highlights
- NBA Sixth Man of the Year (2017); NBA Three-Point Contest champion (2017); NBA All-Rookie Second Team (2009); Third-team All-American – AP (2008); First-team All-Big Ten (2008); Big Ten Freshman of the Year (2008); McDonald's All-American (2007); Indiana Mr. Basketball (2007); First-team Parade All-American (2007); Fourth-team Parade All-American (2006)
- Stats at NBA.com
- Stats at Basketball Reference
Medals
Men's basketball
Representing United States
FIBA World Championship
Gold medal – first place	2010 Turkey	National team

Eric Ambrose Gordon Jr. (born December 25, 1988) is a Bahamian-American professional basketball player who last played for the Philadelphia 76ers of the National Basketball Association (NBA). In high school, he was named Indiana Mr. Basketball during his senior year while playing at North Central High School. He is known, in part, as the subject of a recruiting competition between the University of Illinois and Indiana University in the spring and summer of 2006; because of Gordon's talent and high level of play that year, his recruitment was the subject of media coverage.

Gordon played one season of college basketball at Indiana and was considered one of the top collegiate players in the nation that year. He finished his freshman season leading the Big Ten in scoring and tied for 19th in the nation at 21.5 points per game. Gordon entered the 2008 NBA draft and was selected seventh overall by the Los Angeles Clippers.

== Early life ==
Gordon was born in Indianapolis. At age four, he began playing sports at the Jewish Community Center across the street from his home, starting with soccer and then quickly moving on to basketball. At age seven he began playing competitive basketball at the Municipal Gardens. It was at the JCC that Gordon announced his departure from college to enter his name into the NBA draft.

=== High school ===
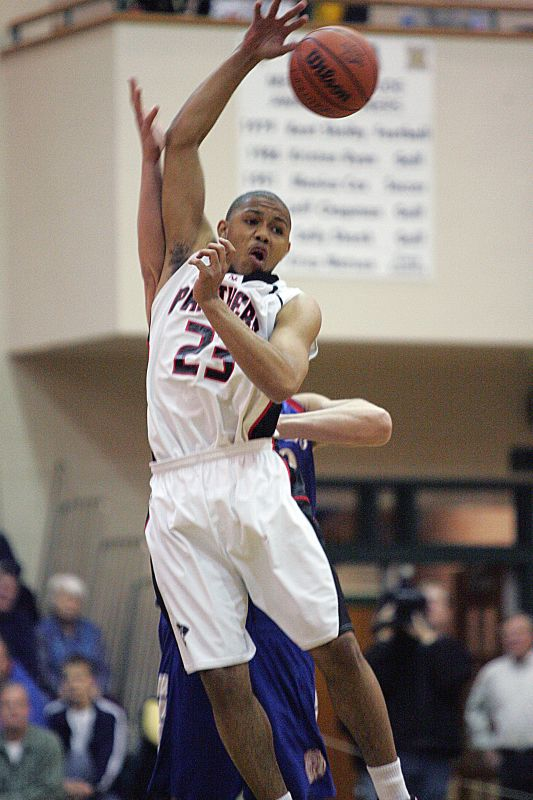
Gordon in 2007 as a high school basketball player

Gordon attended Fox Hill Elementary School, down the street from his childhood home. He then attended Northview Middle School and North Central High School, where he played varsity basketball all four years. North Central's 2007 game against Loyola Academy of Wilmette, Illinois which featured Michael Jordan's sons, Jeffrey and Marcus, was aired on ESPN. He scored a record high of 43 points that night. He later went on to score 50 points twice during the season. He led North Central to the Indiana 4A title game his senior year. They fell to E'Twaun Moore, Angel Garcia and East Chicago Central. Gordon averaged 29 points, 6.2 rebounds and 3.3 assists while shooting 57.0% from the field, 77.9% from the free-throw line, and 46.2% from three-point range. He was named Indiana's "Mr. Basketball" for 2007 as well as a McDonald's All-American. Rivals.com ranked him the nation's #2 high school prospect in the class of 2007, behind Michael Beasley.

During the summer, Gordon attended many AAU tournaments, Adidas Superstar camps, and Big Time in Las Vegas. He played on teams that included future NBA players Mike Conley Jr., Josh McRoberts, Daequan Cook, Derrick Rose and Greg Oden.

=== Recruitment ===
In 2005 as a sophomore in high school, Gordon made an early verbal commitment to Bruce Weber, who had somewhat recently replaced Bill Self as the University of Illinois' head coach when Self left to accept the head coaching position at Kansas.

On November 30, 2005, Gordon made a verbal commitment to play basketball for Weber at Illinois, despite overtures from Duke, Arizona and Notre Dame. Gordon and his family cited their comfort with Weber, the relatively short distance to the Illinois campus from their Indianapolis home, and the success of former Illini guards Deron Williams and Luther Head in the NBA as reasons for their decision.

On February 15, 2006, Sports Illustrated reported that Mike Davis, then the head coach at Indiana University, intended to resign after the 2005–06 season, due in part to a lack of support after the team failed to make the NCAA tournament in 2004 and 2005. Indiana subsequently hired Kelvin Sampson as the new men's basketball coach in March 2006. Some reporters speculated that Gordon was uninterested in playing at Indiana under Mike Davis because of Davis's lack of success. Shortly after Sampson was named head coach, he hired Jeff Meyer, Eric Gordon Sr.'s college basketball coach and a longtime family friend, as an assistant.

During the subsequent offseason, Gordon was recruited by Sampson's staff after Gordon told Sampson he was again interested in Indiana. It was rumored in July 2006 that Gordon was considering opting out of his verbal commitment to Illinois because of concerns about the quality of Weber's Illinois recruiting class, but Gordon said that although he was a childhood fan of the Hoosiers and was considering Indiana, he was still committed to Illinois. During that same month, Gordon played with fellow top-5 recruit Derrick Rose in an attempt to convince Rose to join him at Illinois, but Rose declined the offer.

Rumors of an impending IU commitment continued into the start of the 2006–07 academic year, fueled in part by Gordon's rise to the top of some services' rankings of high school basketball players and the reemergent Indiana Hoosier basketball program. On September 2, 2006, Gordon and Rose made an unofficial visit to Indiana to scrimmage with Hoosier players, fueling further speculation that Gordon would switch his commitment. Six weeks later, on October 13, 2006, Eric Sr. announced that his son had officially decided to do so. Gordon signed a National Letter of Intent with Indiana on November 8, 2006.

=== Aftermath ===
Gordon's announcement gave Indiana a very strong 2007 recruiting class, ranked by some analysts as the third-best incoming class in the country. Sampson and Weber both received criticism from fellow coaches for failing to communicate with one another about Gordon's recruitment. Although the NCAA does not regulate verbal commitments or the recruitment of orally committed players, some observers have claimed that Sampson acted unethically in recruiting a committed player without first contacting Weber.

The timing of the switch was particularly damaging for Illinois, which had planned for Gordon to be part of its class, and was left without a shooting guard at a time when other guards had made verbal commitments. The Illini received a letter of intent from top 100 shooting guard Quinton Watkins of Compton, California, the following December, but, due to NCAA Academic Clearinghouse issues, he did not play for the Illini, eventually deciding to enroll at San Diego State.

Gordon was warmly welcomed by Indiana fans, but received sharp criticism from Illinois fans for publicly maintaining to the press his commitment to playing at Illinois until just a few weeks before he signed with Indiana. Eric Sr. stated in October 2006 that his son had received death threats as a result of his decision, but his son later stated that Illinois fans had only said they did not want the younger Gordon to be successful. On February 7, 2008, when Gordon and Indiana played Illinois in Champaign, he was the target of loud booing and taunting throughout the game. Illinois fans were reportedly particularly enraged that the Gordon family, and its entourage, wore "Got Gordon?" T-shirts. At one point during the game, Eric Sr. stood up, turned around facing away from the court, and "flipped off" the Illinois fans, which caused fans to focus their ire on Gordon Sr. rather than just his son. Some witnesses reported that his parents were hit with ice, empty plastic water bottles, and orange-and-blue beads near the game's end. Illinois's athletic director, Ron Guenther, apologized for the incident, calling fan behavior "disappointing and intolerable."

== College career ==
Gordon attended Indiana University Bloomington (IU). There he played shooting guard with the Hoosiers for one year and planned to study sports management. During his year at IU, Gordon attained many honors. He was the Big Ten Freshman of the Year and made the third team All-American. He is IU's all-time leading freshman scorer. He set a record at IU and in the Big Ten with 669 points. He was a candidate for the Wooden Award and Naismith Award, and was named second-team All-American for CBSSports.com. He wore number 23, as he did in high school.

Gordon finished his freshman season averaging 20.9 points, 3.3 rebounds, and 2.4 assists per game, making 33.7% of his three-point shots and leading the Big Ten in scoring. He was highly effective for Indiana in his first 18 games as the Hoosiers started the season with 17 wins and only one loss, but entered into a noticeable shooting slump at the end of the year, making only 18.6% of his three-point field goal attempts (13 of 70) after Indiana's February 7 win against Illinois and shooting only 3 of 15 from the field and 0-of-6 from the three-point line in the team's loss to Arkansas in the first round of the 2008 NCAA tournament. Gordon played the second half of the season with an injured wrist.

On March 10, 2008, Gordon was named Big Ten Freshman of the Year and to the First Team of the Big Ten Conference by the coaches and media, along with his teammate D. J. White. He was also a third-team All-American.

Gordon announced on April 4, 2008, at 4:00pm at the Jewish Community Center that he would enter the 2008 NBA draft.

== Professional career ==
=== Los Angeles Clippers (2008–2011) ===
He was drafted with the seventh pick in the 2008 NBA draft by the Los Angeles Clippers. Gordon scored 23 points in his first NBA Summer League game in the Las Vegas summer league on the campus of UNLV. Gordon played in two summer league games where he averaged 19 points and 6.5 rebounds. Gordon injured his hamstring July 12 against the Charlotte Bobcats. It was confirmed on July 13, 2008, by the Clippers that Gordon would miss the rest of summer league due to a strained left hamstring.

However, at the start of the 2008 NBA pre-season, Gordon made his offensive prowess known in only his second exhibition game, scoring 33 points in 31 minutes to help the Clippers defeat the Sacramento Kings 116–112. On January 23, he set a Clippers franchise record for most points scored by a rookie with 41 points (a record since broken by Blake Griffin). With Gordon's exceptional performance, he was named the NBA Western Conference Rookie of the Month for January. He averaged 16.1 points, 2.6 rebounds, 2.8 assists, 1.0 steals in 34.3 minutes per game and was the third leading scorer among all rookies. For his efforts, he was unanimously selected to the NBA All-Rookie Second Team and finished fifth in Rookie of the Year voting.

Gordon participated in the 2010 NBA All-Star Weekend. During the 2010 NBA All-Star Weekend, Gordon and DeMar DeRozan went head-to-head in the inaugural Sprite All-Star Slam Dunk-In, which took place at halftime of the Rookie Challenge. The fans went on to choose DeRozan as their vote to advance to the main event, the Sprite Slam Dunk Contest. Gordon was also selected to the sophomore team for the 2010 T-Mobile NBA Rookie Challenge and Youth Jam event.

Gordon finished second on his team with 16.9 points, averaged 2.6 rebounds, 3.0 assists in a team-high 36.0 minutes. He appeared in 62 games, and started in 60 games. He led his team in scoring 16 times, steals 17 times and minutes 16 times. Gordon scored 30-plus points once and had 20-plus points 19 times. He was one of 27 players named to 2010–12 USA Men's National Team Program.

After winning the gold medal in the 2010 FIBA World Championship, Gordon was geared towards a breakout season. Gordon was on a scoring tear earlier in the season but was slowed down in his game against the Golden State Warriors, with a hard foul committed by Andris Biedriņš, which forced Gordon (who was averaging 24.1 points per game before the injury) to be sidelined for 18 games. It was later revealed that Gordon had a sprained wrist with a bone chip fracture. Returning from an 18-game absence, Gordon had a solid performance with a win against the Houston Rockets with 24 points. Gordon re-aggravated his sprained wrist the second game back against the Denver Nuggets, this time a hard foul committed by Timofey Mozgov, which gave Gordon a six-game absence. Gordon's breakout season was hampered by injuries and he had to wear a wristband for the remainder of the season.

Gordon finished the season as the Clippers' second-leading scorer, with 22.3 points per game. He also averaged 2.9 rebounds and 4.4 assists per game. Gordon scored 30-plus points eight times and had a streak of 20 or more points for 12 consecutive games.

=== New Orleans Hornets / Pelicans (2011–2016) ===
==== 2011–2013: First years in New Orleans ====
On December 14, 2011, the Clippers traded Gordon, Chris Kaman, Al-Farouq Aminu, and a 2012 first-round pick (previously acquired from the Minnesota Timberwolves) to the New Orleans Hornets in exchange for future teammate Chris Paul and two future second-round picks. In his first ever game as a Hornet, playing against the Phoenix Suns, Gordon recorded 20 points, 4 rebounds, and 3 assists. He also hit the game winning shot with 4.2 seconds remaining, and New Orleans defeated the Suns in the season opener 85–84. It was revealed that Gordon had a pre-existing knee injury that he aggravated during the opening game of the season against the Phoenix Suns after bumping knees with Grant Hill. Initially Gordon was diagnosed with having a bone bruise, but after further examinations by doctors, it was determined that Gordon had cartilage damage in his right knee. On February 14, 2012, Gordon underwent successful arthroscopic surgery on his knee and was out of action for 6 weeks. Gordon returned on April 4, 2012, to face the Denver Nuggets and scored 15 points giving the New Orleans Hornets a 94–92 victory.

Gordon finished the season with 9 games played, averaging 20.6 points per game, 2.8 rebounds per game and 3.4 assists per game. He entered the summer of 2012 as a restricted free agent.

On July 11, 2012, Gordon signed an offer sheet with the Phoenix Suns reportedly worth $58 million for four years. On July 14, 2012, the Hornets matched the four-year offer sheet.

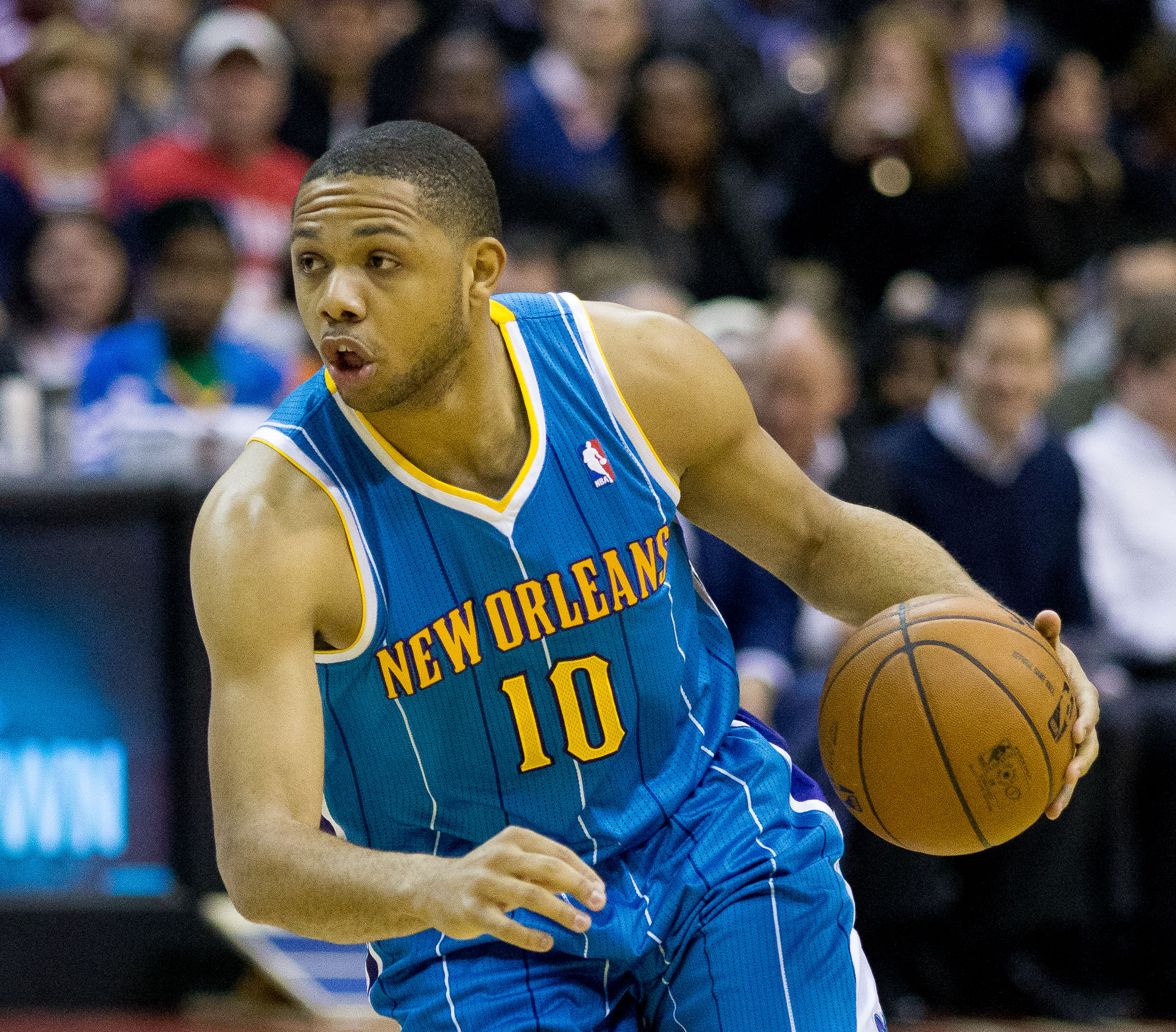
Gordon with the Hornets in March 2013

During the offseason, Gordon admitted that he faced lingering problems with his knee. Microfracture surgery was reportedly proposed as a solution, but in early November, Gordon received a second opinion from a doctor in Chicago, who prescribed continued rehab or his knee and estimated that Gordon would miss 4–6 weeks. On November 7, 2012, Gordon was sent to Los Angeles to get more personalized rehabilitation work to help in his knee recovery and to strengthen his quad muscles.

On December 29, 2012, Gordon made his highly anticipated season debut against the Charlotte Bobcats. Gordon, coming off the bench, scored 24 points, 7 assists and 2 steals in less than 25 minutes, giving the New Orleans Hornets a 98–95 win over the Bobcats. Team doctors placed Gordon on strict restrictions from playing in the second game of back-to-back sets and from playing over 30 minutes to avoid overworking his right knee. On January 5, 2013, Gordon returned to the starting lineup. Gordon hit the game-winner with 4.7 seconds left after drawing a foul on Dallas Mavericks guard Darren Collison, to help the New Orleans Hornets edged the Mavericks 99–96 in overtime. On April 10, 2013, Gordon played his first back-to-back set of the season against the Sacramento Kings after he was cleared by team doctors for his restrictions to be lifted.

Gordon finished the season as the Hornets' leading scorer, with 17.0 points per game, 1.8 rebounds and 3.3 assists per game in 42 games played. In April 2013, the Hornets were renamed the New Orleans Pelicans.

==== 2013–2016: First season in playoffs and injuries ====
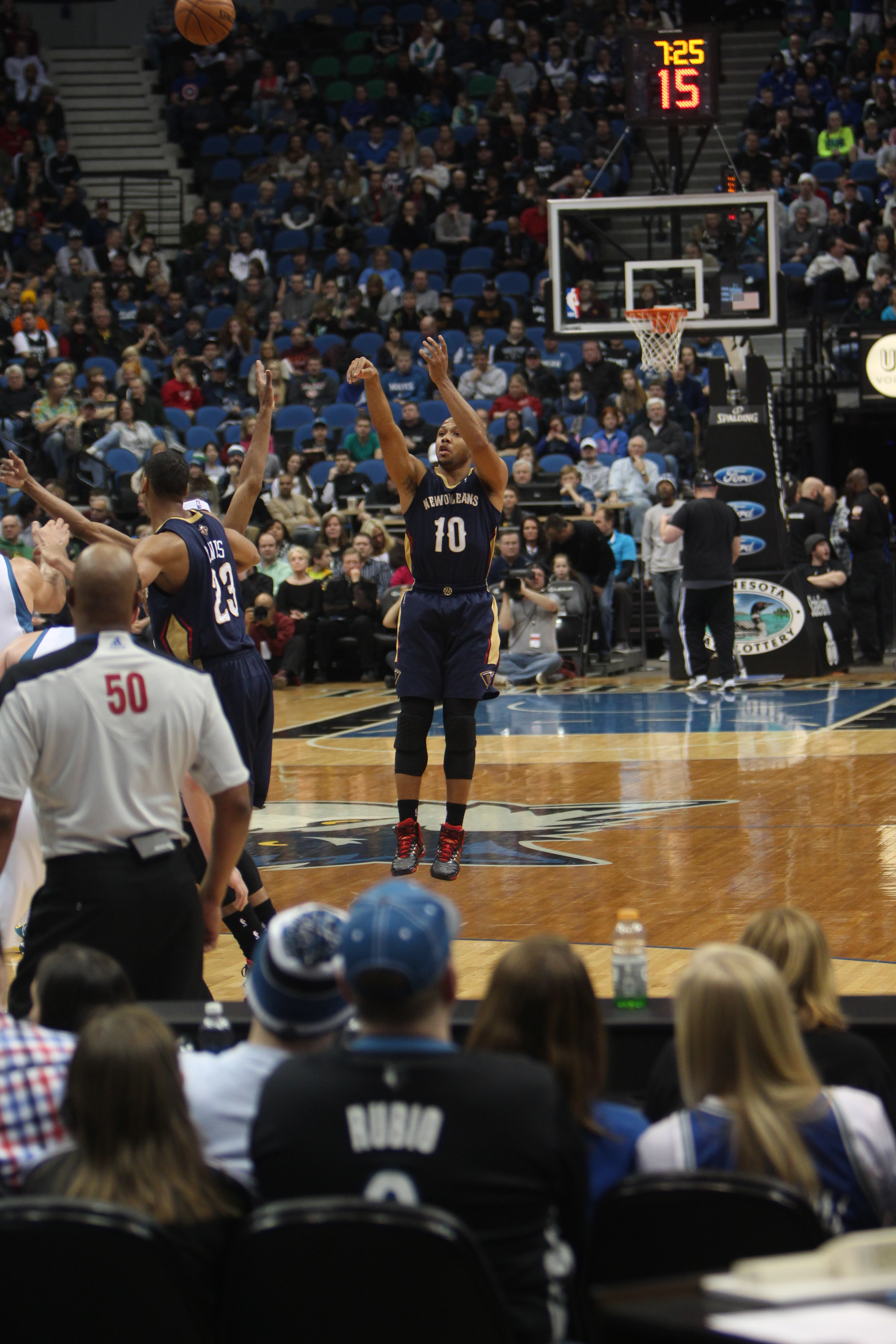
Gordon with the Pelicans in January 2014

On November 29, 2013, Gordon recorded 26 points and 7 assists in a 121–105 win over the Philadelphia 76ers. On January 15, 2014, he recorded 35 points, on 11-for-17 shooting from the field, and 6 assists, in a 100–103 loss to the Houston Rockets. On March 4, 2014, Gordon scored 28 points and was 9-for-13 from the field, including 4-for-5 on threes, and made each of his six attempts from the free throw line. His all-around offense sparked the Pelicans to a 132–125 road win and ended an eight-game losing skid.

On March 21, 2014, Gordon left the game in the first quarter against the Hawks. It was later ruled he had knee tendinitis. On April 10, 2014, it was ruled that Gordon will have arthroscopic surgery performed on his left knee, which brought his season to a close.

Gordon finished the 2013–14 season averaging 15.4 points per game, 2.6 rebounds and 3.3 assists per game in 64 games.

After averaging 9.5 points per game over the first 12 games of the season, Gordon was ruled out indefinitely with a left shoulder injury on November 24, 2014. An MRI revealed he suffered a torn labrum as a result of the left shoulder subluxation injury that he sustained against the Utah Jazz on November 22. He subsequently missed 21 games with the injury before returning to the court on January 5, 2015, against the Washington Wizards. In just under 33 minutes of action, he recorded 6 points, 4 rebounds and 5 assists in the 85–92 loss. Two days later, he hit three three-pointers against the Charlotte Hornets, going on to make at least one three-pointer in 36 consecutive games, a streak that finally came to an end on March 25 when he went 0-for-3 from beyond the arc against the Houston Rockets.

Gordon finished the 2014–15 season averaging 13.4 points, 2.6 rebounds and 3.8 assists in 61 games. Despite missing 21 games this season as he successfully rehabilitated a torn left labrum injury instead of opting for season-ending surgery, Gordon had the best long-range shooting year of his career. He was 141-of-315, 44.8 percent, from beyond the three-point line, besting his career high by more than five percentage points, finishing second in the league behind Kyle Korver. Gordon helped the Pelicans qualify for the playoffs. In his playoff debut, Gordon recorded 16 points, 2 rebounds, 3 assists and was 4-of-7 from the three-point line, ending with a 106–99 loss to the Golden State Warriors. In Game 4, Gordon recorded 29 points, 3 rebounds and 5 assists, but his performance was not enough as the Pelicans were swept by the Warriors in the first round.

On June 18, 2015, Gordon exercised his player option for the 2015–16 season.

Gordon appeared in all 41 games for the Pelicans to begin the 2015–16 season, starting in 40 of them and logging at least 15 minutes in every game. On January 19, 2016, he sustained a hand injury midway through the third quarter of New Orleans' 114–99 win over the Minnesota Timberwolves. Following the game, a fractured bone in the ring finger of his shooting hand was found. The next day, he underwent successful surgery to repair his fractured right ring finger and was subsequently ruled out for four to six weeks. He returned to action on February 27 against the Minnesota Timberwolves after missing 16 games. In 34 minutes of action, he scored an equal game-high 31 points in a 112–110 loss to the Timberwolves. After re-injuring his right ring finger on March 5, he underwent another round of surgery, which ruled him out for the rest of the season.

=== Houston Rockets (2016–2023) ===
==== 2016–2019: Sixth Man of the Year and Conference finals ====
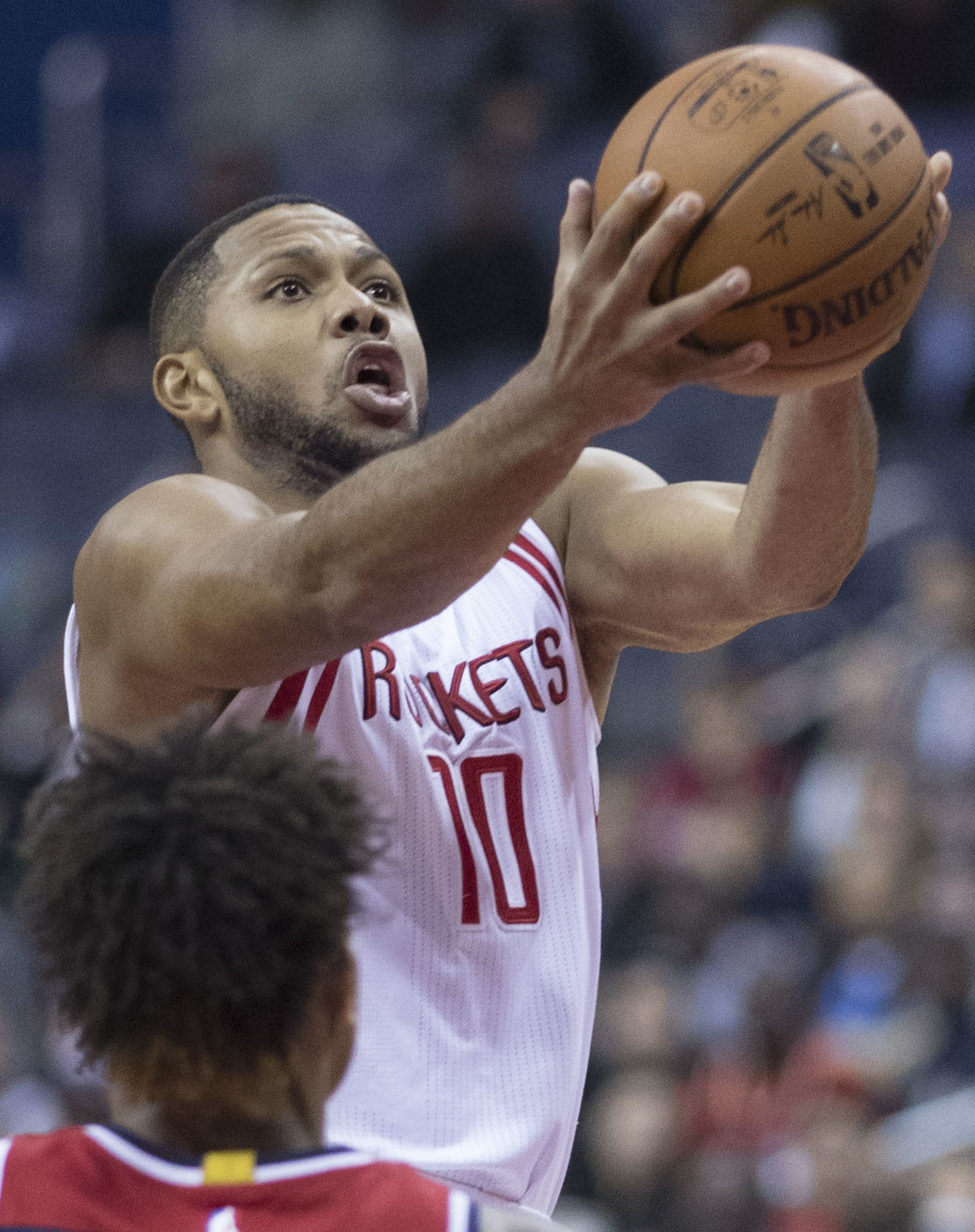
Gordon with Houston in 2016

On July 9, 2016, Gordon signed a four-year, $53 million contract with the Houston Rockets. He made his debut for the Rockets in their season opener on October 26, scoring 19 points in a 120–114 loss to the Los Angeles Lakers. On November 27, he scored 26 points and hit six three-pointers in a 130–114 win over the Portland Trail Blazers. On December 7, he made a career-high eight three-pointers and scored 26 points off the bench in a 134–95 win over the Los Angeles Lakers. On December 16, he had a 29-point game in a 122–100 win over the New Orleans Pelicans. The Rockets made an NBA-record 24 three-pointers in the game, led by Gordon's 7-for-12 effort. On January 2, 2017, he scored a season-high 31 points in a 101–91 win over the Washington Wizards. On February 18, Gordon edged out Kyrie Irving to win the Three-Point Contest during the NBA All-Star Weekend. On March 4, Gordon scored 18 points and made six of Houston's 18 three-pointers in a 123–108 win over the Memphis Grizzlies. Gordon finished the game with 180 three-pointers made during the season; his 180 three-pointers in 49 games off the bench in 2016–17 set an NBA record—the previous record was 179 set by Mirza Teletović in 78 games as a reserve in 2015–16. Gordon finished the 2016–17 season averaging 16.2 points, 2.7 rebounds and 2.5 assists in 75 games (60 games as their primary reserve). He was subsequently named the recipient of the NBA Sixth Man of the Year Award, becoming the first player in franchise history to receive the award.

On October 25, 2017, Gordon scored a then season-high 29 points and hit the game-winning buzzer-beating 3-pointer to lift the Rockets to a 105–104 win over the Philadelphia 76ers. On December 18, he scored 17 of his season-high 33 points in the fourth quarter of the Rockets' 120–99 win over the Utah Jazz. He finished with a season-high seven 3-pointers. On March 27, 2018, he scored 31 points and tied a career high with eight 3-pointers in a 118–86 win over the Chicago Bulls. In Game 5 of the Western Conference Finals, Gordon came off the bench to score 24 points and his steal on Golden State's last possession secured a 98–94 victory that gave the Rockets a 3–2 lead. The Rockets went on to lose the series in seven games.

On November 26, 2018, Gordon scored a season-high 36 points in a 135–131 overtime loss to the Washington Wizards. On January 16, 2019, in a 145–142 overtime loss to the Brooklyn Nets, Gordon had 20 points in his return after missing eight games with a bruised right knee. On April 7, he tied a career high with eight 3-pointers in a 149–113 win over the Phoenix Suns. In Game 3 of the Rockets' second-round playoff series against the Golden State Warriors, Gordon scored a playoff career-high 30 points with a playoff-best seven 3-pointers in a 126–121 overtime win. The Rockets eventually lost the series in six games.

==== 2019–2023: Injury-plagued seasons ====
On September 4, 2019, Gordon signed a four-year, $75.6 million contract extension with the Rockets. On November 13, he underwent arthroscopic surgery on his right knee and was expected to be sidelined for about six weeks. On January 27, 2020, Gordon scored a career-high 50 points on 14-of-22 field goal shooting and 6–11 shooting from 3 in a 126–117 win against the Utah Jazz. He became the third Rocket during the season to score 40 or more points in one game (Russell Westbrook and James Harden) and the first player other than Harden to score 50 or more points in 24 years. On September 4, during the Rockets' second-round playoff series against the Los Angeles Lakers, Gordon recorded 23 points and three rebounds in a 112–97 Game 1 win. The Rockets eventually lost the series in five games.

The 2020–21 season was a major shift for the Rockets, as they traded All-Star guard Russell Westbrook during the offseason. Franchise player James Harden then asked for a trade early into the season, and P.J. Tucker was also dealt during the season. On January 23, 2021, Gordon scored a season-high 33 points, alongside three rebounds and two assists, in a 133–108 win over the Dallas Mavericks. On March 12, Gordon was ruled out for 4-to-6 weeks with a groin strain, although the injury eventually ended his season. During his injury-riddled season, Gordon only played 27 games as the Rockets finished with a 17–55 record and missed the playoffs for the first time since 2012.

On December 13, 2021, Gordon scored a season-high 32 points, alongside three rebounds and three assists, in a 132–126 win over the Atlanta Hawks. On March 29, 2022, Gordon was ruled out for the remainder of the 2021–22 season with a groin injury. The Rockets missed the playoffs for a second straight season.

On February 3, 2023, Gordon scored a season-high 28 points, alongside three rebounds and five assists, in a 117–111 loss to the Toronto Raptors.

=== Return to the Clippers (2023) ===
On February 9, 2023, Gordon was traded back to the Los Angeles Clippers in a three-team trade involving the Memphis Grizzlies.

On June 28, 2023, Gordon was waived by the Clippers.

=== Phoenix Suns (2023–2024) ===
On July 6, 2023, Gordon signed with the Phoenix Suns on a two-year, $6.5 million contract with a player option in the second year.

On June 27, 2024, Gordon opted out of his player option in his $3.4 million contract with the Suns for the 2024–25 season, making him a free agent.

=== Philadelphia 76ers (2024–2026) ===
On July 10, 2024, Gordon signed a two-year, $6.7 million contract with the Philadelphia 76ers. He played in 39 games (13 starts) for the 76ers during the 2024-25 season, averaging 6.8 points, 1.2 rebounds, and 1.7 assists. On February 26, 2025, Gordon underwent arthroscopic surgery on his right wrist, necessitating a three-month recovery period and effectively ending his season.

On June 29, 2025, Gordon declined his $3.4 million player option and entered free agency. On July 1, he re-signed with the 76ers on a one-year, $3.6 million contract. Gordon made six appearances for Philadelphia in the 2025–26 season, averaging 5.5 points, 0.3 rebounds, and 0.5 assists.

On February 5, 2026, Gordon and the right to swap second-round picks in 2032 were traded to the Memphis Grizzlies in exchange for the draft rights to Justinian Jessup. The next day, Gordon was waived by the Grizzlies.

== Career statistics ==
Legend
GP	Games played	GS	Games started	MPG	Minutes per game
FG%	Field goal percentage	3P%	3-point field goal percentage	FT%	Free throw percentage
RPG	Rebounds per game	APG	Assists per game	SPG	Steals per game
BPG	Blocks per game	PPG	Points per game	**Bold**	Career high

=== NBA ===
==== Regular season ====
Year	Team	GP	GS	MPG	FG%	3P%	FT%	RPG	APG	SPG	BPG	PPG
2008–09	L.A. Clippers	**78**	**65**	34.3	.456	.389	.854	2.6	2.8	1.0	.4	16.1
2009–10	L.A. Clippers	62	60	36.0	.449	.371	.742	2.6	3.0	1.1	.2	16.9
2010–11	L.A. Clippers	56	56	**37.7**	.450	.364	.825	**2.9**	**4.4**	1.3	.3	**22.3**
2011–12	New Orleans	9	9	34.5	.450	.250	.754	2.8	3.4	**1.4**	.4	20.6
2012–13	New Orleans	42	40	30.1	.402	.324	.842	1.8	3.3	1.1	.2	17.0
2013–14	New Orleans	64	64	32.1	.436	.391	.785	2.6	3.3	1.2	.2	15.4
2014–15	New Orleans	61	60	33.1	.411	.448	.805	2.6	3.8	.8	.2	13.4
2015–16	New Orleans	45	44	32.9	.418	.384	**.888**	2.2	2.7	1.0	.3	15.2
2016–17	Houston	75	15	31.0	.406	.372	.840	2.7	2.5	.6	**.5**	16.2
2017–18	Houston	69	30	31.2	.428	.359	.809	2.5	2.2	.6	.4	18.0
2018–19	Houston	68	53	31.7	.409	.360	.783	2.2	1.9	.6	.4	16.2
2019–20	Houston	36	15	28.2	.369	.317	.766	2.0	1.5	.6	.3	14.4
2020–21	Houston	27	13	29.2	.433	.329	.825	2.1	2.6	.5	**.5**	17.8
2021–22	Houston	57	46	29.3	.475	.412	.778	2.0	2.7	.5	.3	13.4
2022–23	Houston	47	47	30.2	.439	.347	.815	2.1	2.9	.6	.4	13.1
2022–23	L.A. Clippers	22	11	24.9	.463	.423	.842	1.7	2.1	.6	.4	11.0
2023–24	Phoenix	68	24	27.8	.443	.378	.797	1.8	2.0	1.0	.4	11.0
2024–25	Philadelphia	39	13	19.7	.426	.409	.750	1.2	1.7	.7	.3	6.8
2025–26	Philadelphia	6	0	12.3	**.571**	**.571**	.500	.3	.5	.7	.2	5.5
Career		931	665	31.1	.430	.373	.809	2.3	2.7	.8	.4	15.2

==== Playoffs ====
Year	Team	GP	GS	MPG	FG%	3P%	FT%	RPG	APG	SPG	BPG	PPG
2015	New Orleans	4	4	35.8	.444	.406	.833	2.3	**3.8**	.5	.5	**18.5**
2017	Houston	11	2	32.6	.421	.386	.722	**3.9**	2.0	.7	.5	12.9
2018	Houston	**17**	2	32.3	.380	.331	.836	2.6	1.6	.6	.5	15.4
2019	Houston	11	11	**37.2**	**.447**	.400	.857	2.5	1.3	.6	**1.0**	17.8
2020	Houston	12	**12**	34.1	.409	.322	**.875**	2.7	3.0	.8	.6	17.3
2023	L.A. Clippers	5	5	29.8	.409	.345	.833	1.4	2.6	.6	.4	10.2
2024	Phoenix	4	0	29.5	.321	**.412**	**.875**	1.8	1.3	**1.3**	.5	8.0
Career		64	36	33.4	.410	.361	.838	2.7	2.1	.7	.6	15.1

=== College ===
Year	Team	GP	GS	MPG	FG%	3P%	FT%	RPG	APG	SPG	BPG	PPG
2007–08	Indiana	32	32	34.7	.433	.337	.834	3.3	2.4	1.3	.6	20.9

== National team career ==
=== USA ===
In nine games played for Team USA in the 2010 FIBA World Championship in Istanbul, Turkey, Gordon averaged 8.6 points while finishing second on the team in three-pointers made (19) and second on the team in three-point percentage (.452, 19–42), helping the United States finish a perfect record of (9–0) en route to winning the gold medal.

=== The Bahamas ===
On August 7, 2023, FIBA permitted Gordon to switch to The Bahamas. He played at the 2024 Olympics Pre-Qualifying Tournament. During the championship game there, Gordon led the team in points scored with 27 total to help the Bahamas win the event and gain entry for the 2024 FIBA Men's Olympic Qualifying Tournaments.

== Personal life ==
Gordon's mother, Denise, is a native of Nassau, The Bahamas. Denise met Gordon Sr. at Liberty University where Gordon Sr. played basketball and is still the school's 18th-leading scorer.

Gordon has two younger brothers, Evan and Eron. Evan played two years at Liberty (2009–2011), Arizona State (2012–13) and played his senior season at Indiana (2013–14). Eron played two years at Seton Hall (2016–18) and two years at Valparaiso University (2019–21).

In November 2020, Gordon opened "Eric Gordon's Greek's Pizzeria", in Bloomington, Indiana, directly across from Memorial Stadium.

== Accomplishments and awards ==
=== NBA ===
- NBA Sixth Man of the Year (2017)
- NBA Three-Point Contest champion (2017)
- NBA All-Rookie Second Team (2009)
- NBA Western Conference Rookie of the Month (January 2009)

=== Overall achievements ===
- LA Sports Award for 2010 Greatest Moments
- 2010 FIBA World Championship Gold Medalist
- 2008 Big Ten Freshman of the Year
- 2008 First Team All-Big Ten
- 2008 Third Team All-American
- Gatorade National Male Athlete of the Year (2007)
- McDonald All-American (2007)
- First-team Parade All-American (2007)
- Jordan Brand All-American (2007)
- Indiana Mr. Basketball (2007)
- Fourth-team Parade All-American (2006)

== See also ==
- 2006 boys high school basketball All-Americans
- List of NBA career 3-point scoring leaders

Awards and achievements
Preceded by Greg Oden	Indiana Mr. Basketball award 2007	Succeeded by Tyler Zeller
