= P. J. Tucker =

American basketball player (born 1985)

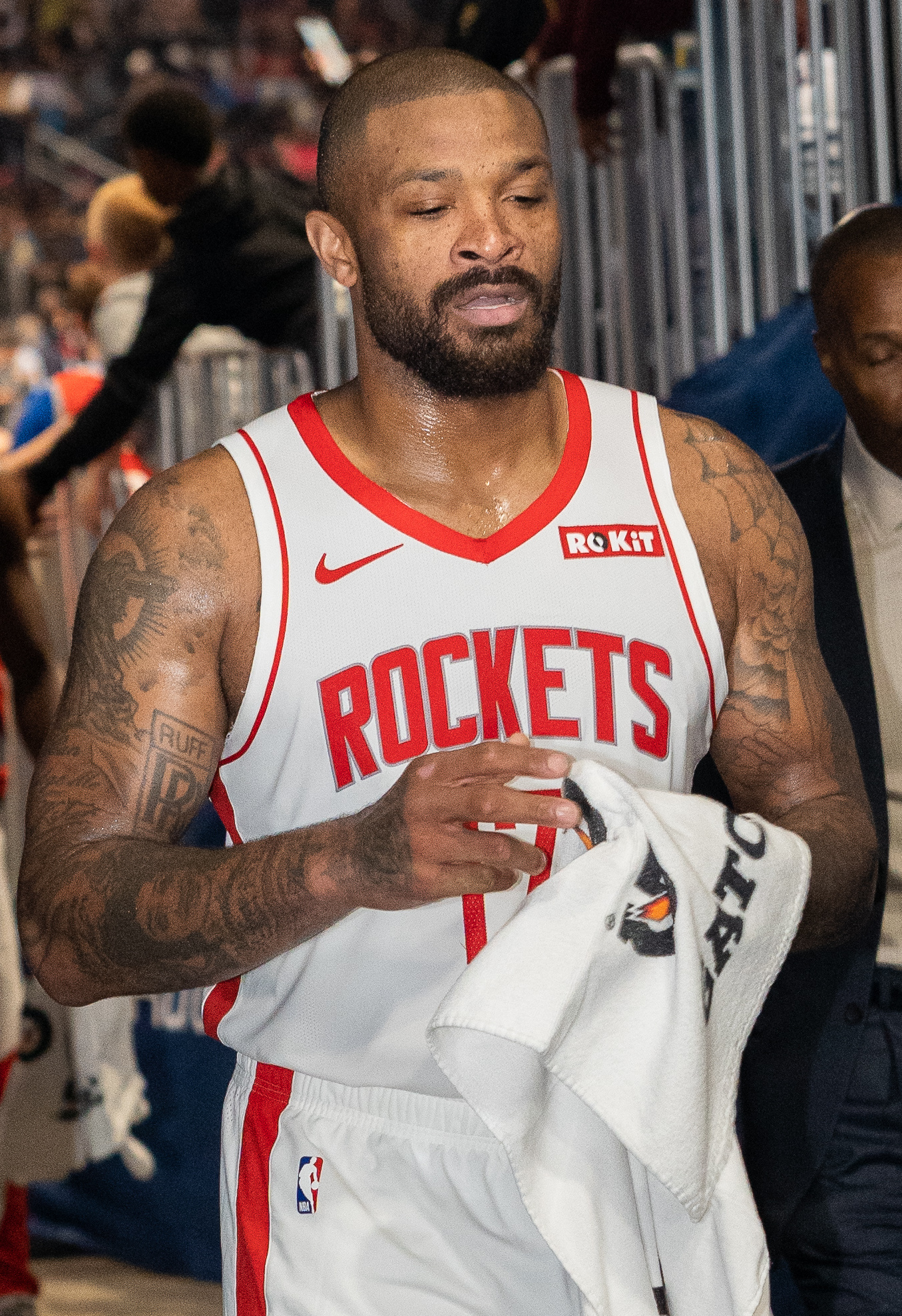
- Tucker with the Houston Rockets in 2019

Personal information
- Born: May 5, 1985 (age 41) Raleigh, North Carolina, U.S.
- Listed height: 6 ft 5 in (1.96 m)
- Listed weight: 111 kg (245 lb)

Career information
- High school: William G. Enloe (Raleigh, North Carolina)
- College: Texas (2003–2006)
- NBA draft: 2006: 2nd round, 35th overall pick
- Drafted by: Toronto Raptors
- Playing career: 2006–2025
- Position: Power forward / small forward
- Number: 1, 17, 2, 4

Career history
- 2006–2007: Toronto Raptors
- 2007: →Colorado 14ers
- 2007–2008: Hapoel Holon
- 2008–2010: BC Donetsk
- 2010: Bnei HaSharon
- 2010–2011: Aris Thessaloniki
- 2011: Montegranaro
- 2011: Piratas de Quebradillas
- 2011–2012: Brose Bamberg
- 2012–2017: Phoenix Suns
- 2017: Toronto Raptors
- 2017–2021: Houston Rockets
- 2021: Milwaukee Bucks
- 2021–2022: Miami Heat
- 2022–2023: Philadelphia 76ers
- 2023–2025: Los Angeles Clippers
- 2025: New York Knicks

Career highlights
- NBA champion (2021); Israeli Super League champion (2008); Israeli Super League MVP (2008); Israeli Basketball Premier League Finals MVP (2008); German League champion (2012); German League Finals MVP (2012); German Cup champion (2012); German Champions Cup (2012); German League All-Star (2012); German League Import Player of the Year (2012); Ukrainian SuperLeague All-Star (2009); Consensus second-team All-American (2006); Big 12 Player of the Year (2006); First-team All-Big 12 (2006); Big 12 All-Freshman Team (2004)

Career NBA statistics
- Points: 5,863 (6.6 ppg)
- Rebounds: 4,778 (5.4 rpg)
- Assists: 1,225 (1.4 apg)
- Stats at NBA.com
- Stats at Basketball Reference

Anthony Leon "P.J." Tucker Jr. (born May 5, 1985) is an American former professional basketball player. Regarded as a reliable corner three-point shooter and perimeter defender all throughout his career, Tucker won an NBA championship with the Milwaukee Bucks in 2021. He played college basketball for the Texas Longhorns. Outside his NBA career, he was also the 2008 Israeli Basketball Premier League MVP, and Israeli Basketball Premier League Finals MVP and also won championships in the Israeli Super League in 2008 with Hapoel Holon, the German League and the German Cup in 2012 with Brose Bamberg.

== High school and college ==
Tucker attended William G. Enloe High School in Raleigh, North Carolina, where he was named North Carolina Player of the Year in 2003 and his jersey number was later retired. In three seasons at the University of Texas at Austin, he scored 1,169 points, including a career-high 594 in the 2005–06 season. He also had 714 rebounds, 170 assists (including 107 in 2005–06), and 116 steals throughout his career with the Longhorns. After being unable to play most of his sophomore season due to poor academics, Tucker was named a second-team All-American and the Big 12 Player of the Year in his junior year.

== Professional career ==
=== Toronto Raptors (2006–2007) ===
Tucker was selected by the Toronto Raptors with the 35th pick in the 2006 NBA draft and signed a two-year deal with them on July 26, 2006.

On January 5, 2007, the Raptors announced that Tucker had been sent to the Colorado 14ers of the NBA Development League. Colorado, led by head coach Joe Wolf, had been designated as Toronto's D-League affiliate for the 2006–07 season. On February 6, 2007, the Raptors recalled Tucker to the NBA. On March 6, 2007, Tucker was sent back to the 14ers.

On March 24, 2007, Tucker was waived by the Raptors in order to free a roster spot for Luke Jackson. He played a total of 83 minutes during his rookie season with the Raptors.

In the offseason, Tucker joined 2007 Summer League roster for the Cleveland Cavaliers.

=== Hapoel Holon (2007–2008) ===
In the 2007–08 season with Hapoel Holon from Israeli Premier League, Tucker won the MVP trophy and led his team to the league title. Holon broke Maccabi Tel Aviv's 14-year streak as Israeli champions. He was the 2008 Israeli Basketball Premier League Finals MVP.

=== Donetsk (2008–2010) ===
For the 2008–09 season, Tucker signed with a BC Donetsk team that was just promoted to the Ukrainian Basketball SuperLeague. He led the team to a current third place in the league at its first appearance there, as well as become a Ukrainian SuperLeague All-Star. A season ending knee injury didn't prevent Tucker from finishing the season with the highest average of points per game in the league. On October 7, 2009, Tucker renewed his contract with Donetsk for the 2009–10 season.

=== Bnei HaSharon (2010) ===
After Donetsk bankrupted, Tucker returned to Israel in March 2010 and signed for Bnei HaSharon until the end of the season.

=== Aris (2010–2011) ===
In August 2010, Tucker signed with Aris BC for the 2010–11 season, but he was released in March 2011.

=== Montegranaro (2011) ===
In April 2011, Tucker signed with Sutor Basket Montegranaro in Italy.

=== Brose Bamberg (2011–2012) ===
In July 2011, Tucker signed a one-year deal with Brose Baskets Bamberg of Germany. He went on to help Brose Baskets win the 2012 championship; he also won the Finals MVP award.

=== Phoenix Suns (2012–2017) ===
During the summer of 2012, Tucker signed a contract to play for Spartak St. Petersburg of Russia, but he soon opted out of it to play for the Phoenix Suns' NBA Summer League team, and on August 1, 2012, he signed a two-year deal with the Suns, with a team option in his second year. In his first game back in the NBA, Tucker recorded 10 points, 2 rebounds, 1 steal and 1 block in an 87–85 loss to the Golden State Warriors. On November 23, 2012, he scored a then-career-high 15 points in a 111–108 overtime win over the New Orleans Hornets. Tucker made his first start for the Suns on December 31 against the Oklahoma City Thunder, as he started the majority of the Suns' games for the rest of the 2012–13 NBA season.

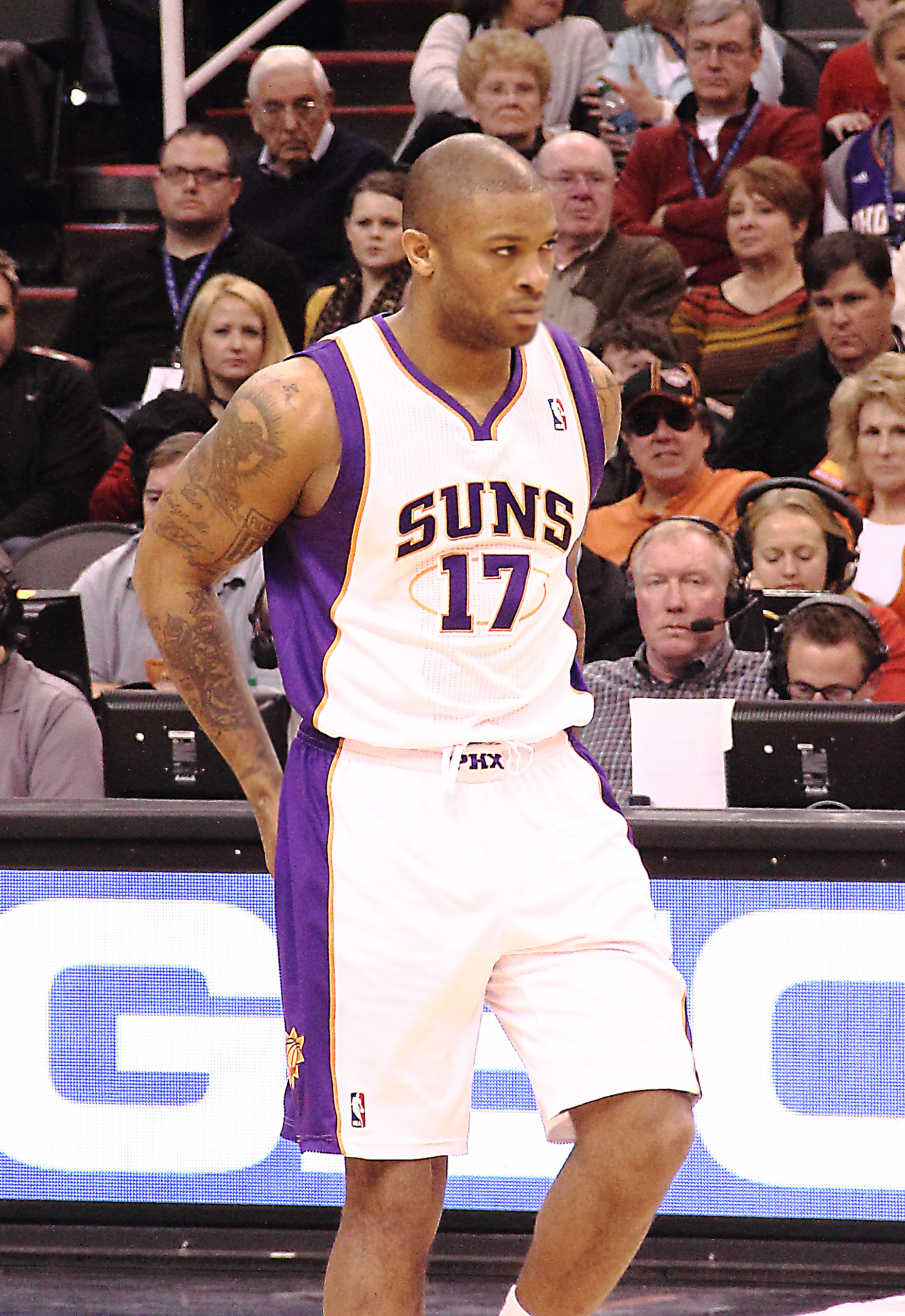
Tucker with the Suns in 2012

On February 8, 2014, Tucker recorded 16 points, a career-high 15 rebounds and 4 steals in a 122–109 win over the Warriors, becoming the first Suns player to have 15 points, 15 rebounds and 4 steals in a game since Shawn Marion in 2007. On February 25, he tied his career high with a 15-rebound effort against the Minnesota Timberwolves. On April 6, Tucker scored a career-high 22 points in a 122–115 win over the Thunder.

On June 27, 2014, the Suns extended Tucker a qualifying offer, making him a restricted free agent. On July 23, he re-signed with the Suns to a three-year, $16.5 million contract. In August 2014, he was suspended for the first three games of the 2014–15 season without pay for pleading guilty to driving while under the extreme influence in May 2014. He returned from suspension on November 4, 2014, to face the Los Angeles Lakers.

On December 31, 2015, Tucker tied his then-career high of 22 points in a loss to the Thunder. On January 26, 2016, he recorded a career-high eight assists in a loss to the Philadelphia 76ers. On March 14, he scored a career-high 23 points in a 107–104 win over the Minnesota Timberwolves. He topped that mark on April 7, scoring 24 points in a 124–115 win over the Houston Rockets. He played in all 82 games for the Suns in 2015–16, the only player to do so.

On September 15, 2016, Tucker underwent a successful low back microdiscectomy procedure and was subsequently ruled out for six to eight weeks. He returned in time for the start of the regular season, but was assigned a bench role for the first time since the 2012–13 season. He returned to the starting lineup in late November following an injury to T. J. Warren. On November 27, 2016, he scored a season-high 21 points against the Denver Nuggets. Tucker reassumed his bench role in late December following Warren's return from injury; he continued coming off the bench for the Suns throughout the season until the All-Star break.

=== Return to Toronto (2017) ===
On February 23, 2017, Tucker was traded back to the Toronto Raptors in exchange for Jared Sullinger, second-round draft picks in 2017 and 2018 and cash considerations. The next day, in his first game as a Raptor since 2007, Tucker had a game-high 10 rebounds and nine points in a 107–97 win over the Boston Celtics. On April 15, 2017, after playing 418 games over seven seasons, Tucker made his playoff debut in the Raptors' 97–83 loss to the Milwaukee Bucks in Game 1 of their first-round playoff series. The Raptors went on to defeat the Bucks in six games to move on to the second round, where they faced the Cleveland Cavaliers. There they were swept 4–0 by the Cavaliers. In Game 4 of the series, a 109–102 loss, Tucker had 14 points and 12 rebounds in his first career playoff start.

=== Houston Rockets (2017–2021) ===
On July 6, 2017, Tucker signed a four-year, $32 million contract with the Houston Rockets. In his debut for the Rockets in their season opener on October 17, 2017, Tucker scored 20 points in a 122–121 win over the Golden State Warriors. He hit two free throws with 44.1 seconds left to make it 122–121. On March 30, 2018, he scored 18 points and made a career-high five 3-pointers in a 104–103 win over the Suns. In Game 5 of the Rockets' first-round playoff series against the Minnesota Timberwolves, Tucker scored a playoff career-high 15 points in a 122–104 series-clinching win. In Game 5 of the Rockets' second-round series against the Utah Jazz, Tucker set a then-new playoff career high with 19 points in a 112–102 series-clinching win. In Game 2 of the Western Conference Finals against the Golden State Warriors, Tucker set a new playoff career high with 22 points in a 127–105 win, helping the Rockets tie the series at 1–1. The Rockets went on to lose to the Warriors in seven games. After the series, Rockets head coach Mike D'Antoni said that Tucker underwent three root canal procedures prior to playing in Game 7, and played Game 6 through several cracked teeth.

On January 7, 2019, Tucker set a career high with seven 3-pointers and scored a season-high 21 points in a 125–113 win over the Denver Nuggets.

On March 11, 2021, as the trade deadline approached, Tucker had mutually agreed with coach Stephen Silas to no longer play until both parties can find an amicable solution. This comes after James Harden left the Rockets earlier in the season. Prior to his exit, he posted career lows in points per game (4.4), field goal percentage (36.6%) and 3-point percentage (31.4%) in the 2020/21 season.

=== Milwaukee Bucks (2021) ===
On March 19, 2021, Tucker was traded to the Milwaukee Bucks along with Rodions Kurucs in exchange for D. J. Augustin, D. J. Wilson, and draft compensation. He made his Bucks debut on March 20 in a 120–113 win over the San Antonio Spurs.

Tucker quickly established himself as a key defensive contributor for Milwaukee during the 2021 NBA playoffs. In the Eastern Conference semifinals, he served as the primary defender on Kevin Durant as the Bucks defeated the Brooklyn Nets in seven games. Milwaukee subsequently defeated the Atlanta Hawks in the Eastern Conference Finals, advancing Tucker to his first NBA Finals appearance.

In the 2021 NBA Finals, Tucker served as Milwaukee's defensive specialist, primarily guarding Devin Booker and Jae Crowder. The Bucks defeated the Phoenix Suns in six games, securing the franchise's first NBA championship since 1971 and the first championship of Tucker's career.

Although Tucker appeared in only 43 games during his five-month tenure with Milwaukee, including 23 playoff games, he became a fan favorite for his defense and veteran leadership during the Bucks' championship run.

=== Miami Heat (2021–2022) ===
On August 7, 2021, Tucker signed a two year, $14.35 million contract with the Miami Heat. On December 13, in a loss against the Cavaliers, Tucker tied his career-high 23 points, grabbed 9 rebounds, and recorded 5 assists.

=== Philadelphia 76ers (2022–2023) ===
On July 6, 2022, Tucker signed a 3-year, $33.2 million contract with the Philadelphia 76ers. On February 25, 2023, Tucker recorded a season-high 16 rebounds and scored seven points during a 110–107 loss to the Boston Celtics.

=== Los Angeles Clippers (2023–2025) ===
On November 1, 2023, the Los Angeles Clippers acquired Tucker, James Harden, and Filip Petrušev from the 76ers in exchange for Marcus Morris Sr., Nicolas Batum, Kenyon Martin Jr. and Robert Covington. As part of the trade, the Clippers dealt a first-round pick, two second-round picks, a pick swap, and cash considerations to the 76ers, while sending a pick swap and cash considerations to the Oklahoma City Thunder. On February 15, 2024, Tucker was fined $75,000 by the NBA for publicly requesting a trade, after having been removed from the Clippers’ active rotation. Before the start of the 2024–25 season, the Clippers announced that Tucker will not be with the team moving forward for the foreseeable future. On February 1, 2025, Tucker, Mo Bamba, a 2030 second-round pick and cash considerations were traded to the Utah Jazz in exchange for Drew Eubanks and Patty Mills. On February 6, 2025, Tucker was traded to the Toronto Raptors in a five-team trade, including Jimmy Butler to the Warriors. On February 28, 2025, he was waived by the Raptors.

=== New York Knicks (2025) ===
On March 10, 2025, the New York Knicks signed Tucker to a 10-day contract. On March 20, the Knicks signed Tucker to a new 10-day contract. He was waived by the team on March 30. On March 31, he officially signed to a 2-year deal with the team, with a team option on the 2025-26 season, making him eligible for the playoffs. On June 12, Tucker announced his intent to play in the NBA for his 15th season. On June 29, it was reported that the Knicks would decline Tucker's team option.

On May 7, 2026, Tucker announced his retirement from professional basketball.

== Career statistics ==
Legend
GP	Games played	GS	Games started	MPG	Minutes per game
FG%	Field goal percentage	3P%	3-point field goal percentage	FT%	Free throw percentage
RPG	Rebounds per game	APG	Assists per game	SPG	Steals per game
BPG	Blocks per game	PPG	Points per game	**Bold**	Career high
†	Won an NBA championship	*	Led the league

=== NBA ===
==== Regular season ====
Year	Team	GP	GS	MPG	FG%	3P%	FT%	RPG	APG	SPG	BPG	PPG
2006–07	Toronto	17	0	4.9	**.500**	—	.571	1.4	.2	.1	.0	1.8
2012–13	Phoenix	79	45	24.2	.473	.314	.744	4.4	1.4	.8	.2	6.4
2013–14	Phoenix	81	81	30.7	.431	.387	.776	6.5	1.7	1.4	.3	**9.4**
2014–15	Phoenix	78	63	30.6	.438	.345	.727	6.4	1.6	1.4	.3	9.1
2015–16	Phoenix	**82***	80	31.0	.411	.330	.746	6.2	**2.2**	1.3	.2	8.0
2016–17	Phoenix	57	17	28.5	.415	.338	.792	6.0	1.3	1.5	.2	7.0
2016–17	Toronto	24	4	25.4	.406	.400	.688	5.4	1.1	1.3	.2	5.8
2017–18	Houston	**82***	34	27.8	.390	.371	.717	5.6	.9	1.0	.3	6.1
2018–19	Houston	**82***	**82***	34.2	.396	.377	.695	5.8	1.2	**1.6**	.5	7.3
2019–20	Houston	72	72	**34.3**	.415	.358	.813	**6.6**	1.6	1.1	.5	6.9
2020–21†	Houston	32	32	30.0	.366	.314	.783	4.6	1.4	.9	.6	4.4
2020–21†	Milwaukee	20	1	19.8	.391	.394	.600	2.8	.8	.5	.1	2.6
2021–22	Miami	71	70	27.9	.484	.415	.738	5.5	2.1	.8	.2	7.6
2022–23	Philadelphia	75	75	25.6	.427	.393	.826	3.9	.8	.5	.2	3.5
2023–24	Philadelphia	3	3	22.1	.400	.400	—	4.7	.0	1.0	**.7**	2.0
2023–24	L.A. Clippers	28	7	15.0	.356	.367	**1.000**	2.5	.6	.5	.2	1.6
2024–25	New York	3	1	19.3	.429	**.500**	–	2.7	.0	.3	.3	3.0
Career		886	667	28.2	.425	.366	.750	5.4	1.4	1.1	.3	6.6

==== Playoffs ====
Year	Team	GP	GS	MPG	FG%	3P%	FT%	RPG	APG	SPG	BPG	PPG
2017	Toronto	10	1	25.1	.367	.321	.625	5.7	1.1	.6	.3	5.0
2018	Houston	17	17	33.5	.481	.467	.667	6.5	1.3	.6	**.8**	8.9
2019	Houston	11	11	**38.7**	.455	.456	**.826**	**7.5**	1.7	**1.7**	.7	**11.4**
2020	Houston	12	12	34.5	.398	.373	—	7.2	1.5	1.1	.3	7.9
2021†	Milwaukee	**23***	**19**	29.6	.388	.322	.750	5.8	1.1	1.0	.1	4.3
2022	Miami	18	18	28.3	.495	.451	.688	5.7	**1.8**	.8	.3	7.9
2023	Philadelphia	11	11	26.7	.373	.350	.667	4.5	1.5	1.2	.3	4.9
2024	L.A. Clippers	2	1	15.3	**.667**	**.750**	—	1.5	.0	.0	.0	5.5
2025	New York	1	0	4.0	—	—	—	.0	.0	.0	.0	.0
Career		105	90	30.3	.436	.404	.722	5.7	1.4	.9	.4	6.9

=== College ===
Year	Team	GP	GS	MPG	FG%	3P%	FT%	RPG	APG	SPG	BPG	PPG
2003–04	Texas	33	16	22.5	**.547**	—	.650	6.8	.8	.9	.2	10.4
2004–05	Texas	17	16	29.4	.526	.000	.716	8.0	2.2	1.2	.2	13.7
2005–06	Texas	**37**	**37**	**34.5**	.515	**.667**	**.747**	**9.5**	**2.9**	**1.8**	**.4**	**16.1**
Career		87	69	28.9	.526	.500	.711	8.2	2.0	1.3	.3	13.4

== Personal life ==
Tucker's full name is Anthony Leon Tucker Jr., but his father called him "Pop Junior", giving him the nickname P. J. He spent part of his childhood living in Germany while his father served in the Army.

Tucker married his long-term girlfriend Tracey in 2010. They have three children.

=== Footwear and fashion ===
Tucker is a self-proclaimed "sneakerhead" and owns thousands of pairs of sneakers, stored in several locations across the country. On August 22, 2016, SLAM named Tucker the solidified number 1 sneakerhead in the NBA, due to not only his number of shoes, but also their quality. Some of his shoes include rare "player edition" pairs of sneakers made for former NBA players such as Shawn Marion, Michael Finley, Josh Howard and Eddie Jones, as well as some rare Terror Squad pairs designed by the rapper Fat Joe.

In 2020, Tucker signed a short-term content deal with eBay to help them boost their sales. The 'Sneaker Loft' showcased between 700 and 1,000 of Tucker's most premium pairs. The collection included a pair of Nike SB Dunk Ben & Jerry's "Chunky Dunky" that he purchased on eBay for $2,000. Tucker's relationship with eBay traces back to his University of Texas days when he was introduced to the platform by former Longhorns teammate, Royal Ivey.

In a June 2021 interview with GQ, Tucker said on his love of fashion: "What regular people call stuntin' is everyday life for me. Like, I get dressed up everyday. Everyday I leave the house, even if I just put on some sweats, it ain't just some sweats. I'm puttin' on something. I take my time to get dressed. I care about my appearance. If I look good, I play good. It all coincides, it all goes together, it's a chain reaction."
