= 2017–18 Houston Rockets season =

Franchise in the National Basketball Association

- Division champions
- Head coach: Mike D'Antoni
- General manager: Daryl Morey
- Owner: Tilman Fertitta
- Arena: Toyota Center

Results
- Record: 65–17 (.793)
- Place: Division: 1st (Southwest); Conference: 1st (Western)
- Playoff finish: Western Conference Finals (lost to Warriors 3–4)
- Stats at Basketball Reference

Local media
- Television: AT&T SportsNet Southwest
- Radio: Sportstalk 790

The 2017–18 Houston Rockets season was the 51st season of the franchise in the National Basketball Association (NBA), and their 47th in the Houston area. The Rockets acquired star point guard Chris Paul from the Los Angeles Clippers due to a multitude of trades after the 2017 NBA draft on June 28, 2017, as well as for being the team's first under current owner Tilman Fertitta. The Rockets also broke their franchise record for most wins in a season with their 59th win against the New Orleans Pelicans, eventually totalling 65 wins on the season. With a loss by the Warriors on March 29, the Rockets clinched the No. 1 seed for the first time in franchise history, which then followed to clinch the best record in this season following a Raptors loss against the Celtics.

In the playoffs, the Rockets defeated the 8th-seeded Minnesota Timberwolves in the First round in five games, advancing to the conference semifinals, where they defeated the Utah Jazz in five games. They lost the conference finals to the eventual NBA champion Golden State Warriors in seven games. During Game 7 of that series, with the chance to go to the NBA Finals for the first time since 1995, the Rockets lost 101–92 and set an NBA Playoff record by missing 27 straight 3-point shots.

== Draft picks ==
Round	Pick	Player	Position	Nationality	College / club
2	43	Isaiah Hartenstein	PF/C	Germany	Žalgiris Kaunas (Lithuania)

== Roster ==
2017–18 Houston Rockets roster
Players

Pos.	No.	Player	Height	Weight	DOB	From
F	33	Ryan Anderson	6 ft 10 in (2.08 m)	240 lb (109 kg)	1988–05–06	California
G/F	1	Trevor Ariza	6 ft 8 in (2.03 m)	215 lb (98 kg)	1985–06–30	UCLA
F/C	28	Tarik Black	6 ft 9 in (2.06 m)	250 lb (113 kg)	1991–11–22	Kansas
G	26	Markel Brown (TW)	6 ft 3 in (1.91 m)	190 lb (86 kg)	1992–01–29	Oklahoma State
C	15	Clint Capela	6 ft 10 in (2.08 m)	240 lb (109 kg)	1994–05–18	INSEP
G	10	Eric Gordon	6 ft 4 in (1.93 m)	215 lb (98 kg)	1988–12–25	Indiana
G/F	14	Gerald Green	6 ft 7 in (2.01 m)	205 lb (93 kg)	1986–01–26	Gulf Shores Academy (TX)
G	13	James Harden	6 ft 5 in (1.96 m)	220 lb (100 kg)	1989–08–26	Arizona State
G	2	R. J. Hunter (TW)	6 ft 5 in (1.96 m)	185 lb (84 kg)	1993–10–24	Georgia State
G	55	Aaron Jackson	6 ft 3 in (1.91 m)	183 lb (83 kg)	1986–05–06	Duquesne
G/F	7	Joe Johnson	6 ft 7 in (2.01 m)	240 lb (109 kg)	1981–06–29	Arkansas
F	12	Luc Mbah a Moute	6 ft 8 in (2.03 m)	230 lb (104 kg)	1986–09–09	UCLA
F/C	42	Nenê	6 ft 11 in (2.11 m)	250 lb (113 kg)	1982–09–13	Brazil
C	21	Chinanu Onuaku	6 ft 10 in (2.08 m)	245 lb (111 kg)	1996–11–01	Louisville
G	3	Chris Paul	6 ft 0 in (1.83 m)	175 lb (79 kg)	1985–05–06	Wake Forest
F	4	P. J. Tucker	6 ft 6 in (1.98 m)	245 lb (111 kg)	1985–05–05	Texas
F/C	9	Zhou Qi	7 ft 1 in (2.16 m)	210 lb (95 kg)	1996–01–16	China

Coaches
Head coach
- Mike D'Antoni
Assistant(s)
- Jeff Bzdelik
- Josh Oppenheimer
- Brett Gunning
- Roy Rogers
- John Lucas (player development)

Legend
- (DP) Unsigned draft pick
- (FA) Free agent
- (S) Suspended
- (GL) On assignment to G League affiliate
- (TW) Two-way affiliate player
- Injured

Roster
Updated: 2018–04–29

== Standings ==
=== Division ===
Southwest Division	W	L	PCT	GB	Home	Road	Div	GP
z – Houston Rockets	65	17	.793	–	34‍–‍7	31‍–‍10	12–4	82
x – New Orleans Pelicans	48	34	.585	17.0	24‍–‍17	24‍–‍17	9–7	82
x – San Antonio Spurs	47	35	.573	18.0	33‍–‍8	14‍–‍27	9–7	82
Dallas Mavericks	24	58	.293	41.0	15‍–‍26	9‍–‍32	5–11	82
Memphis Grizzlies	22	60	.268	43.0	16‍–‍25	6‍–‍35	5–11	82

=== Conference ===
Western Conference
#	Team	W	L	PCT	GB	GP
1	z – Houston Rockets *	65	17	.793	–	82
2	y – Golden State Warriors *	58	24	.707	7.0	82
3	y – Portland Trail Blazers *	49	33	.598	16.0	82
4	x – Oklahoma City Thunder	48	34	.585	17.0	82
5	x – Utah Jazz	48	34	.585	17.0	82
6	x – New Orleans Pelicans	48	34	.585	17.0	82
7	x – San Antonio Spurs	47	35	.573	18.0	82
8	x – Minnesota Timberwolves	47	35	.573	18.0	82
9	Denver Nuggets	46	36	.561	19.0	82
10	Los Angeles Clippers	42	40	.512	23.0	82
11	Los Angeles Lakers	35	47	.427	30.0	82
12	Sacramento Kings	27	55	.329	38.0	82
13	Dallas Mavericks	24	58	.293	41.0	82
14	Memphis Grizzlies	22	60	.268	43.0	82
15	Phoenix Suns	21	61	.256	44.0	82

== Game log ==
=== Preseason ===
2017 pre-season game log
Total: 4–1 (home: 1–1; road: 3–0)
Pre-season: 4–1 (home: 1–1; road: 3–0)

Game	Date	Team	Score	High points	High rebounds	High assists	Location Attendance	Record
1	October 3	@ Oklahoma City	W 104–97	Eric Gordon (21)	Mbah a Moute, Tucker (7)	James Harden (10)	BOK Center; 17,733	1–0
2	October 5	Shanghai Sharks	W 144–82	Trevor Ariza (18)	Clint Capela (11)	Chris Paul (12)	Toyota Center; 16,012	2–0
3	October 9	@ New York	W 117–95	James Harden (36)	Capela, Harden (9)	James Harden (11)	Madison Square Garden; N/A	3–0
4	October 11	@ Memphis	W 101–89	James Harden (18)	Capela, Tucker (9)	James Harden (9)	FedExForum; 13,212	4–0
5	October 13	San Antonio	L 97–106	Eric Gordon (27)	Clint Capela (12)	James Harden (11)	Toyota Center; 17,445	4–1

2017–18 season schedule

=== Regular season ===
2017–18 game log
Total: 65–17 (home: 34–7; road: 31–10)
October: 5–3 (home: 1–2; road: 4–1)

Game	Date	Team	Score	High points	High rebounds	High assists	Location Attendance	Record
1	October 17	@ Golden State	W 122–121	James Harden (27)	Anderson, Paul (8)	Chris Paul (11)	Oracle Arena; 19,596	1–0
2	October 18	@ Sacramento	W 105–100	James Harden (27)	Clint Capela (17)	James Harden (9)	Golden 1 Center; 17,583	2–0
3	October 21	Dallas	W 107–91	James Harden (29)	Anderson, Capela (10)	James Harden (7)	Toyota Center; 18,055	3–0
4	October 23	Memphis	L 90–98	Eric Gordon (27)	P. J. Tucker (8)	James Harden (8)	Toyota Center; 17,129	3–1
5	October 25	@ Philadelphia	W 105–104	Eric Gordon (29)	Clint Capela (20)	James Harden (13)	Wells Fargo Center; 20,682	4–1
6	October 27	@ Charlotte	W 109–93	James Harden (27)	James Harden (10)	James Harden (11)	Spectrum Center; 17,339	5–1
7	October 28	@ Memphis	L 89–103	Ryan Anderson (22)	Clint Capela (12)	James Harden (8)	FedExForum; 17,033	5–2
8	October 30	Philadelphia	L 107–115	James Harden (29)	Clint Capela (15)	James Harden (7)	Toyota Center; 16,714	5–3

November : 12–1 (home: 7–1; road: 5–0)

Game	Date	Team	Score	High points	High rebounds	High assists	Location Attendance	Record
9	November 1	@ New York	W 119–97	James Harden (31)	Clint Capela (13)	James Harden (9)	Madison Square Garden; 18,320	6–3
10	November 3	@ Atlanta	W 119–104	James Harden (29)	Ryan Anderson (8)	James Harden (11)	Philips Arena; 14,087	7–3
11	November 5	Utah	W 137–110	James Harden (56)	P. J. Tucker (9)	James Harden (13)	Toyota Center; 16,914	8–3
12	November 9	Cleveland	W 117–113	James Harden (35)	Clint Capela (13)	James Harden (13)	Toyota Center; 18,055	9–3
13	November 11	Memphis	W 111–96	James Harden (38)	Clint Capela (14)	James Harden (8)	Toyota Center; 18,055	10–3
14	November 12	@ Indiana	W 118–95	James Harden (26)	Clint Capela (17)	James Harden (15)	Bankers Life Fieldhouse; 15,581	11–3
15	November 14	Toronto	L 113–129	James Harden (38)	Clint Capela (11)	James Harden (11)	Toyota Center; 18,055	11–4
16	November 16	@ Phoenix	W 142–116	James Harden (48)	Clint Capela (10)	Chris Paul (10)	Talking Stick Resort Arena; 16,875	12–4
17	November 18	@ Memphis	W 105–83	James Harden (29)	Clint Capela (13)	James Harden (7)	FedExForum; 17,266	13–4
18	November 22	Denver	W 125–95	Trevor Ariza (25)	P. J. Tucker (11)	Chris Paul (12)	Toyota Center; 18,055	14–4
19	November 25	New York	W 117–102	James Harden (37)	Clint Capela (15)	Chris Paul (13)	Toyota Center; 18,055	15–4
20	November 27	Brooklyn	W 117–103	James Harden (37)	James Harden (10)	Chris Paul (14)	Toyota Center; 16,189	16–4
21	November 29	Indiana	W 118–97	James Harden (29)	Clint Capela (13)	James Harden (10)	Toyota Center; 16,760	17–4

December : 9–5 (home: 6–2; road: 3–3)

Game	Date	Team	Score	High points	High rebounds	High assists	Location Attendance	Record
22	December 3	@ L.A. Lakers	W 118–95	James Harden (36)	Clint Capela (13)	James Harden (9)	Staples Center; 18,997	18–4
23	December 7	@ Utah	W 112–101	James Harden (29)	Chris Paul (9)	Chris Paul (13)	Vivint Smart Home Arena; 18,306	19–4
24	December 9	@ Portland	W 124–117	James Harden (48)	Clint Capela (10)	Chris Paul (7)	Moda Center; 19,503	20–4
25	December 11	New Orleans	W 130–123	Clint Capela (28)	Chris Paul (9)	James Harden (17)	Toyota Center; 18,055	21–4
26	December 13	Charlotte	W 108–96	Chris Paul (31)	Clint Capela (11)	Chris Paul (11)	Toyota Center; 16,509	22–4
27	December 15	San Antonio	W 124–109	Harden, Paul (28)	Anderson, Capela (10)	Chris Paul (8)	Toyota Center; 18,055	23–4
28	December 16	Milwaukee	W 115–111	James Harden (31)	P. J. Tucker (10)	Chris Paul (6)	Toyota Center; 18,055	24–4
29	December 18	Utah	W 120–99	Eric Gordon (33)	Clint Capela (20)	Chris Paul (6)	Toyota Center; 18,055	25–4
30	December 20	L.A. Lakers	L 116–122	James Harden (51)	Trevor Ariza (11)	James Harden (9)	Toyota Center; 18,055	25–5
31	December 22	L.A. Clippers	L 118–128	James Harden (51)	Anderson, Tucker (10)	James Harden (8)	Toyota Center; 18,055	25–6
32	December 25	@ Oklahoma City	L 107–112	James Harden (29)	Clint Capela (10)	James Harden (14)	Chesapeake Energy Arena; 18,203	25–7
33	December 28	@ Boston	L 98–99	James Harden (34)	P. J. Tucker (10)	James Harden (9)	TD Garden; 18,624	25–8
34	December 29	@ Washington	L 103–121	James Harden (20)	Ryan Anderson (12)	Chris Paul (6)	Capital One Arena; 20,356	25–9
35	December 31	L.A. Lakers	W 148–142 (2OT)	James Harden (40)	Tarik Black (9)	James Harden (11)	Toyota Center; 18,179	26–9

January : 10–4 (home: 6–1; road: 4–3)

Game	Date	Team	Score	High points	High rebounds	High assists	Location Attendance	Record
36	January 3	@ Orlando	W 116–98	Gerald Green (27)	Clint Capela (8)	Chris Paul (13)	Amway Center; 18,588	27–9
37	January 4	Golden State	L 114–124	Eric Gordon (30)	Clint Capela (10)	Chris Paul (9)	Toyota Center; 18,055	27–10
38	January 6	@ Detroit	L 101–108	Chris Paul (16)	Clint Capela (11)	Chris Paul (13)	Little Caesars Arena; 18,046	27–11
39	January 8	@ Chicago	W 116–107	Gordon, Paul (24)	Clint Capela (16)	Gordon, Paul (9)	United Center; 17,462	28–11
40	January 10	Portland	W 121–112	Chris Paul (37)	Clint Capela (9)	Chris Paul (11)	Toyota Center; 18,055	29–11
41	January 12	@ Phoenix	W 112–95	Chris Paul (25)	Clint Capela (16)	Chris Paul (6)	Talking Stick Resort Arena; 18,055	30–11
42	January 15	@ L.A. Clippers	L 102–113	Gordon, Paul (19)	Capela, Tucker (7)	Chris Paul (7)	Staples Center; 17,622	30–12
43	January 18	Minnesota	W 116–98	Eric Gordon (30)	P. J. Tucker (9)	Chris Paul (9)	Toyota Center; 18,055	31–12
44	January 20	Golden State	W 116–108	Chris Paul (33)	Ryan Anderson (13)	James Harden (8)	Toyota Center; 18,055	32–12
45	January 22	Miami	W 99–90	James Harden (28)	Clint Capela (8)	Chris Paul (6)	Toyota Center; 18,055	33–12
46	January 24	@ Dallas	W 104–97	James Harden (25)	Clint Capela (13)	James Harden (13)	American Airlines Center; 19,378	34–12
47	January 26	@ New Orleans	L 113–115	Chris Paul (38)	Clint Capela (10)	James Harden (11)	Smoothie King Center; 17,186	34–13
48	January 28	Phoenix	W 113–102	James Harden (27)	Clint Capela (11)	James Harden (8)	Toyota Center; 18,055	35–13
49	January 30	Orlando	W 114–107	James Harden (60)	Clint Capela (13)	James Harden (11)	Toyota Center; 18,055	36–13

February : 12–0 (home: 4–0; road: 8–0)

Game	Date	Team	Score	High points	High rebounds	High assists	Location Attendance	Record
50	February 1	@ San Antonio	W 102–91	James Harden (28)	Clint Capela (13)	James Harden (11)	AT&T Center; 18,418	37–13
51	February 3	@ Cleveland	W 120–88	Chris Paul (22)	Capela, Tucker (9)	Chris Paul (11)	Quicken Loans Arena; 20,562	38–13
52	February 6	@ Brooklyn	W 123–113	James Harden (36)	Clint Capela (11)	Harden, Paul (5)	Barclays Center; 15,064	39–13
53	February 7	@ Miami	W 109–101	James Harden (41)	Clint Capela (8)	Chris Paul (7)	American Airlines Arena; 19,600	40–13
54	February 9	Denver	W 130–104	James Harden (28)	Clint Capela (25)	James Harden (11)	Toyota Center; 18,055	41–13
55	February 11	Dallas	W 104–97	James Harden (27)	Clint Capela (11)	Chris Paul (9)	Toyota Center; 18,055	42–13
56	February 13	@ Minnesota	W 126–108	James Harden (34)	Clint Capela (12)	James Harden (13)	Target Center; 18,978	43–13
57	February 14	Sacramento	W 100–91	James Harden (29)	Clint Capela (11)	James Harden (9)	Toyota Center; 18,055	44–13
All-Star Break
58	February 23	Minnesota	W 120–102	James Harden (31)	Clint Capela (11)	James Harden (9)	Toyota Center; 18,055	45–13
59	February 25	@ Denver	W 119–114	James Harden (41)	James Harden (8)	James Harden (7)	Pepsi Center; 20,044	46–13
60	February 26	@ Utah	W 96–85	James Harden (26)	James Harden (11)	Chris Paul (7)	Vivint Smart Home Arena; 18,306	47–13
61	February 28	@ L.A. Clippers	W 105–92	James Harden (25)	Clint Capela (14)	Chris Paul (8)	Staples Center; 19,068	48–13

March : 14–1 (home: 8–0; road: 6–1)

Game	Date	Team	Score	High points	High rebounds	High assists	Location Attendance	Record
62	March 3	Boston	W 123–120	Eric Gordon (29)	Clint Capela (17)	James Harden (10)	Toyota Center; 18,476	49–13
63	March 6	@ Oklahoma City	W 122–112	Chris Paul (25)	James Harden (11)	P. J. Tucker (6)	Chesapeake Energy Arena; 18,203	50–13
64	March 7	@ Milwaukee	W 110–99	James Harden (26)	Clint Capela (8)	Chris Paul (11)	BMO Harris Bradley Center; 17,195	51–13
65	March 9	@ Toronto	L 105–108	James Harden (40)	Clint Capela (13)	James Harden (4)	Air Canada Centre; 20,131	51–14
66	March 11	@ Dallas	W 105–82	Eric Gordon (26)	Tarik Black (9)	Chris Paul (12)	American Airlines Center; 20,394	52–14
67	March 12	San Antonio	W 109–93	James Harden (28)	Capela, Green (9)	Chris Paul (9)	Toyota Center; 18,092	53–14
68	March 15	L.A. Clippers	W 101–96	James Harden (40)	Clint Capela (13)	James Harden (4)	Toyota Center; 18,055	54–14
69	March 17	@ New Orleans	W 107–101	James Harden (32)	Harden, Capela (11)	James Harden (7)	Smoothie King Center; 18,495	55–14
70	March 18	@ Minnesota	W 129–120	James Harden (34)	Clint Capela (12)	James Harden (12)	Target Center; 18,978	56–14
71	March 20	@ Portland	W 115–111	James Harden (42)	Chris Paul (8)	James Harden (7)	Moda Center; 20,012	57–14
72	March 22	Detroit	W 100–96 (OT)	Eric Gordon (22)	Clint Capela (14)	Harden, Gordon (5)	Toyota Center; 18,055	58–14
73	March 24	New Orleans	W 114–91	James Harden (27)	Clint Capela (16)	James Harden (8)	Toyota Center; 18,055	59–14
74	March 25	Atlanta	W 118–99	Gerald Green (25)	James Harden (10)	James Harden (15)	Toyota Center; 18,055	60–14
75	March 27	Chicago	W 118–86	Eric Gordon (31)	P. J. Tucker (8)	Chris Paul (10)	Toyota Center; 18,055	61–14
76	March 30	Phoenix	W 104–103	James Harden (28)	Capela, Harden (8)	James Harden (10)	Toyota Center; 18,055	62–14

April : 3–3 (home: 2–1; road: 1–2)

Game	Date	Team	Score	High points	High rebounds	High assists	Location Attendance	Record
77	April 1	@ San Antonio	L 83–100	James Harden (25)	Clint Capela (10)	James Harden (8)	AT&T Center; 18,418	62–15
78	April 3	Washington	W 120–104	James Harden (38)	Capela, Harden (10)	James Harden (9)	Toyota Center; 18,055	63–15
79	April 5	Portland	W 96–94	Chris Paul (27)	Clint Capela (10)	James Harden (7)	Toyota Center; 18,055	64–15
80	April 7	Oklahoma City	L 102–108	James Harden (26)	P. J. Tucker (10)	Harden, Paul (9)	Toyota Center; 18,055	64–16
81	April 10	@ L.A. Lakers	W 105–99	Chris Paul (22)	Clint Capela (12)	James Harden (10)	Staples Center; 18,997	65–16
82	April 11	@ Sacramento	L 83–96	Gerald Green (31)	Tarik Black (11)	Joe Johnson (5)	Golden 1 Center; 17,583	65–17

2017–18 season schedule

=== Playoffs ===
2018 playoff game log
Total: 11–6 (home: 7–3; road: 4–3)
First Round: 4–1 (home: 3–0; road: 1–1)

Game	Date	Team	Score	High points	High rebounds	High assists	Location Attendance	Series
1	April 15	Minnesota	W 104–101	James Harden (44)	Clint Capela (12)	James Harden (8)	Toyota Center; 18,055	1–0
2	April 18	Minnesota	W 102–82	Chris Paul (27)	Clint Capela (16)	Chris Paul (8)	Toyota Center; 18,055	2–0
3	April 21	@ Minnesota	L 105–121	James Harden (29)	Clint Capela (11)	James Harden (7)	Target Center; 18,978	2–1
4	April 23	@ Minnesota	W 119–100	James Harden (36)	Clint Capela (17)	Chris Paul (6)	Target Center; 18,978	3–1
5	April 25	Minnesota	W 122–104	Clint Capela (26)	Clint Capela (15)	James Harden (12)	Toyota Center; 18,055	4–1

Conference Semifinals: 4–1 (home: 2–1; road: 2–0)

Game	Date	Team	Score	High points	High rebounds	High assists	Location Attendance	Series
1	April 29	Utah	W 110–96	James Harden (41)	Clint Capela (12)	James Harden (7)	Toyota Center; 18,055	1–0
2	May 2	Utah	L 108–116	James Harden (32)	Clint Capela (11)	James Harden (11)	Toyota Center; 18,055	1–1
3	May 4	@ Utah	W 113–92	Gordon, Harden (25)	Clint Capela (8)	James Harden (12)	Vivint Smart Home Arena; 18,306	2–1
4	May 6	@ Utah	W 100–87	Chris Paul (27)	Clint Capela (15)	Chris Paul (6)	Vivint Smart Home Arena; 18,306	3–1
5	May 8	Utah	W 112–102	Chris Paul (41)	Chris Paul (7)	Chris Paul (10)	Toyota Center; 18,055	4–1

Conference Finals: 3–4 (home: 2–2; road: 1–2)

Game	Date	Team	Score	High points	High rebounds	High assists	Location Attendance	Series
1	May 14	Golden State	L 106–119	James Harden (41)	Chris Paul (11)	James Harden (7)	Toyota Center; 18,055	0–1
2	May 16	Golden State	W 127–105	Gordon, Harden (27)	Capela, Harden (10)	Ariza, Paul (6)	Toyota Center; 18,119	1–1
3	May 20	@ Golden State	L 85–126	James Harden (20)	Chris Paul (10)	James Harden (9)	Oracle Arena; 19,596	1–2
4	May 22	@ Golden State	W 95–92	James Harden (30)	P. J. Tucker (16)	Harden, Paul (4)	Oracle Arena; 19,596	2–2
5	May 24	Golden State	W 98–94	Eric Gordon (24)	Clint Capela (14)	Chris Paul (6)	Toyota Center; 18,055	3–2
6	May 26	@ Golden State	L 86–115	James Harden (32)	Clint Capela (16)	James Harden (9)	Oracle Arena; 19,596	3–3
7	May 28	Golden State	L 92–101	James Harden (32)	P. J. Tucker (12)	James Harden (6)	Toyota Center; 18,055	3–4

2018 playoff schedule

== Player statistics ==
Legend
GP	Games played	GS	Games started	MPG	Minutes per game
FG%	Field-goal percentage	3P%	3-point field-goal percentage	FT%	Free-throw percentage
RPG	Rebounds per game	APG	Assists per game	SPG	Steals per game
BPG	Blocks per game	PPG	Points per game

=== Regular season ===
Houston Rockets statistics
Player	GP	GS	MPG	FG%	3P%	FT%	RPG	APG	SPG	BPG	PPG
P. J. Tucker	82	34	27.8	.390	.371	.717	5.6	.9	1.0	.3	6.1
Clint Capela	74	74	27.5	.652	.000	.560	10.8	.9	.8	1.9	13.9
James Harden	72	72	35.4	.449	.367	.858	5.4	8.8	1.8	.7	30.4
Eric Gordon	69	30	31.2	.428	.359	.809	2.5	2.2	.6	.4	18.0
Trevor Ariza	67	67	33.9	.412	.368	.854	4.4	1.6	1.5	.2	11.7
Ryan Anderson	66	50	26.1	.431	.386	.774	5.0	.9	.4	.3	9.3
Luc Mbah a Moute	61	15	25.6	.481	.364	.684	3.0	.9	1.2	.4	7.5
Chris Paul	58	58	31.8	.460	.380	.919	5.4	7.9	1.7	.2	18.6
Nenê	52	4	14.6	.569	.000	.636	3.4	.9	.5	.3	6.5
Tarik Black	51	2	10.5	.591	.091	.460	3.2	.3	.4	.6	3.5
Gerald Green	41	2	22.7	.407	.369	.850	3.2	.6	.6	.4	12.1
Joe Johnson^{†}	23	1	22.0	.381	.279	.952	2.8	1.7	.3	.0	6.0
Bobby Brown	20	0	5.8	.328	.275	.500	.4	.6	.2	.0	2.5
Zhou Qi	18	0	6.9	.188	.105	.667	1.2	.1	.1	.8	1.2
Brianté Weber^{†}	13	0	9.1	.409	.444	1.000	1.4	1.0	.8	.2	2.0
Demetrius Jackson^{†}	12	0	5.3	.286	.000		.9	.4	.3	.1	.7
R. J. Hunter	5	1	9.0	.350	.214	1.000	1.0	.6	.6	.0	3.8
Markel Brown	4	0	7.8	.286	.200		1.3	.5	.0	.0	1.3
Troy Williams^{†}	4	0	4.3	.222	.000	.333	1.0	.3	.3	.0	1.3
Tim Quarterman	3	0	4.3	.333	.000	1.000	1.0	.3	.0	.0	1.3
Aaron Jackson	1	0	35.0	.333	.250	.500	3.0	1.0	.0	.0	8.0
Chinanu Onuaku	1	0	22.0	.400			4.0	1.0	.0	.0	4.0
Brandan Wright^{†}	1	0	15.0	.667			2.0	.0	.0	1.0	4.0
Isaiah Canaan^{†}	1	0	4.0	.000			1.0	.0	.0	.0	.0

=== Playoffs ===
Houston Rockets statistics
Player	GP	GS	MPG	FG%	3P%	FT%	RPG	APG	SPG	BPG	PPG
James Harden	17	17	36.5	.410	.299	.887	5.2	6.8	2.2	.6	28.6
Trevor Ariza	17	17	34.2	.360	.286	.742	3.8	1.3	1.1	.1	8.8
P. J. Tucker	17	17	33.5	.481	.467	.667	6.5	1.3	.6	.8	8.9
Clint Capela	17	17	30.6	.660		.473	11.6	1.3	.8	2.1	12.7
Eric Gordon	17	2	32.3	.380	.331	.836	2.6	1.6	.6	.5	15.4
Gerald Green	17	0	16.0	.394	.375	.857	2.9	.1	.2	.4	6.3
Chris Paul	15	15	34.5	.459	.374	.830	5.9	5.8	2.0	.3	21.1
Nenê	11	0	9.7	.600		.636	2.5	.5	.2	.5	2.8
Ryan Anderson	11	0	8.6	.350	.333		1.2	.5	.3	.1	1.7
Luc Mbah a Moute	9	0	16.6	.250	.200	.571	2.4	.3	.7	.4	2.8
Joe Johnson	8	0	6.8	.353	.000		1.3	.4	.0	.1	1.5
Tarik Black	7	0	2.7	.250			.9	.3	.0	.1	.3
Aaron Jackson	7	0	2.4	.500	.000	.500	.6	.3	.0	.0	.7
Zhou Qi	3	0	2.0	1.000			.3	.0	.0	.0	.7
Chinanu Onuaku	1	0	3.0				1.0	1.0	1.0	.0	.0

- ^{†} Denotes player spent time with another team in the season. Stats reflect time with the Rockets only.

== Transactions ==
=== Trades ===
June 22, 2017	To Houston Rockets Future second-round pick	To Memphis Grizzlies Draft right to Dillon Brooks (pick 45)
June 28, 2017	To Houston Rockets Ryan Kelly	To Atlanta Hawks Cash considerations
June 28, 2017	To Houston Rockets DeAndre Liggins	To Dallas Mavericks Cash considerations
June 28, 2017	To Houston Rockets Darrun Hilliard	To Detroit Pistons Cash considerations
June 28, 2017	To Houston Rockets Shawn Long	To Philadelphia 76ers 2018 second-round pick Cash considerations
June 28, 2017	To Houston Rockets Tim Quarterman	To Portland Trail Blazers Cash considerations
June 28, 2017	To Houston Rockets Chris Paul	To Los Angeles Clippers Sam Dekker; Patrick Beverley; Lou Williams; DeAndre Liggins; Darrun Hilliard; Kyle Wiltjer; Montrezl Harrell; 2018 first round draft Cash considerations
June 29, 2017	To Houston Rockets Jarrod Uthoff	To Dallas Mavericks Cash considerations

=== Free agency ===
==== Re-signed ====
Player	Signed
Nenê	4-year contract worth $15 million
James Harden	4-year contract extension worth $228 million
Troy Williams	3-year contract worth $4.8 million
Bobby Brown	1-year contract worth $1.5 million

==== Additions ====
Player	Signed	Former team
Zhou Qi	4-year contract worth $5.5 million	(China) Xinjiang Flying Tigers
P. J. Tucker	4-year contract worth $32 million	Toronto Raptors
Luc Mbah a Moute	1-year contract worth $2.1 million	Los Angeles Clippers
Tarik Black	1-year contract worth $3.2 million	Los Angeles Lakers
Demetrius Jackson	Two-way contract	Boston Celtics
Brianté Weber	Two-way contract	Charlotte Hornets
Isaiah Canaan	1-year non-guaranteed contract worth $1.5 million	Oklahoma City Thunder
Gerald Green	1-year non-guaranteed contract	Milwaukee Bucks
R. J. Hunter	Two-way contract	Rio Grande Valley Vipers
Markel Brown	Two-way contract	Oklahoma City Blue
Brandan Wright	Veteran's minimum prorated contract	Memphis Grizzlies
Joe Johnson	Veteran's minimum prorated contract	Sacramento Kings
Le'Bryan Nash	10-day contract	(South Korea) Busan KT Sonicboom
Tim Quarterman	2-year non-guaranteed contract	Agua Caliente Clippers
Aaron Jackson	2-year non-guaranteed contract	(China) Beijing Ducks

==== Subtractions ====
Player	Reason left	New team
Isaiah Taylor	Waived	Atlanta Hawks
Isaiah Canaan	Waived	Phoenix Suns
Demetrius Jackson	Waived	Philadelphia 76ers
Brianté Weber	Waived	Sioux Falls Skyforce
Bobby Brown	Waived	(Greece) Olympiacos
Troy Williams	Waived	New York Knicks
Le'Bryan Nash	Not resigned	n/a
Tim Quarterman	Waived	n/a

== Awards ==
Player	Award	Date awarded	Ref.
James Harden	Western Conference Player of the Week	October 23, 2017	
James Harden	Western Conference Player of the Week	November 6, 2017	
James Harden	Western Conference Player of the Month (November)	December 1, 2017	
Mike D'Antoni	Western Conference Coach of the Month (November)	December 1, 2017	
James Harden	Western Conference Player of the Week	December 4, 2017	
Chris Paul	Western Conference Player of the Week	December 18, 2017	
James Harden	NBA All-Star	January 18, 2018	
James Harden	Western Conference Player of the Week	February 5, 2018	
James Harden	Western Conference Player of the Week	February 12, 2018	
Mike D'Antoni	Western Conference Coach of the Month (February)	March 1, 2018	
James Harden	All-NBA First Team	May 24, 2018	
Daryl Morey	NBA Executive of the Year	June 25, 2018	
James Harden	NBA Most Valuable Player	June 25, 2018	
