= 2017–18 NBA season =

72nd NBA season

- League: National Basketball Association
- Sport: Basketball
- Duration: October 17, 2017 – April 11, 2018; April 14 – May 28, 2018 (Playoffs); May 31 – June 8, 2018 (Finals)
- Games: 82
- Teams: 30
- TV partner(s): ABC, TNT, ESPN, NBA TV

Draft
- Top draft pick: Markelle Fultz
- Picked by: Philadelphia 76ers

Regular season
- Top seed: Houston Rockets
- Season MVP: James Harden (Houston)
- Top scorer: James Harden (Houston)

Playoffs
- Eastern champions: Cleveland Cavaliers
- Eastern runners-up: Boston Celtics
- Western champions: Golden State Warriors
- Western runners-up: Houston Rockets

Finals
- Champions: Golden State Warriors
- Runners-up: Cleveland Cavaliers
- Finals MVP: Kevin Durant (Golden State)

NBA seasons
- ← 2016–17 2018–19 →

The 2017–18 NBA season was the 72nd season of the National Basketball Association (NBA). The regular season began on October 17, 2017, earlier than previous seasons to reduce the number of "back-to-back" games teams were scheduled to play, with the 2017 Eastern Conference champion (and Finals runner–up) Cleveland Cavaliers hosting a game against the Boston Celtics at Quicken Loans Arena in Cleveland, Ohio. The 2018 NBA All-Star Game was played on February 18, 2018, at the Staples Center in Los Angeles, California. LeBron James of the Cleveland Cavaliers was named the All-Star Game Most Valuable Player. The regular season ended on April 11, 2018. The playoffs began on April 14, 2018 and ended on June 8 with the Golden State Warriors defeating the Cleveland Cavaliers in the 2018 NBA Finals.

== Transactions ==
=== Retirement ===
- On July 17, 2017, Paul Pierce signed a ceremonial contract with the Boston Celtics and officially retired as a Celtic after playing 19 seasons and winning one championship with the Celtics in 2008.
- On July 19, 2017, James Jones was announced to be the vice president of basketball operations for the Phoenix Suns, which signified his retirement after playing 14 seasons and winning two championships with the Miami Heat in 2012 and 2013 and one championship with the Cleveland Cavaliers in 2016.
- On August 4, 2017, Jason Maxiell signed a ceremonial contract with the Detroit Pistons and officially retired after playing 10 seasons.
- On August 15, 2017, Tayshaun Prince was announced to be assistant general manager for the Memphis Grizzlies, which signified his retirement after playing 15 seasons and winning one championship with the Detroit Pistons in 2004.
- On September 2, 2017, Primož Brezec announced his retirement after 21 professional seasons. Brezec had played in Russia, Cyprus, Kuwait, and his native country Slovenia since last playing in the NBA during the 2009–10 NBA season.
- On October 23, 2017, Metta World Peace was hired as player development coach for the South Bay Lakers, the Los Angeles Lakers' NBA G League affiliate, thus ending his 18-year playing career with the NBA. During his career, he won one NBA championship with the Lakers in 2010.
- On November 19, 2017, David Lee announced his retirement from the NBA via Instagram. Lee won an NBA championship with the Golden State Warriors in 2015.
- On November 20, 2017, Earl Barron became an assistant coach for the Northern Arizona Suns of the NBA G League, thus ending his 14-year playing career. Barron played for seven NBA teams during his career, winning one championship with the Miami Heat in 2006.
- On December 11, 2017, Matt Barnes announced his retirement from the NBA via Instagram. Barnes won an NBA championship with the Golden State Warriors in June 2017.
- On February 8, 2018, Caron Butler announced his retirement after 14 professional seasons. Butler won an NBA championship with the Dallas Mavericks in 2011.
- On February 19, 2018, Tiago Splitter announced his retirement from basketball due to a hip injury. Splitter won an NBA championship with the San Antonio Spurs in 2014.

=== In-season trades ===
- On November 17, 2017, the Phoenix Suns traded Eric Bledsoe to the Milwaukee Bucks for Greg Monroe and two 2018 first-round draft picks.
- On December 7, 2017, the Philadelphia 76ers traded Jahlil Okafor, Nik Stauskas, and a 2019 second-round draft pick to the Brooklyn Nets for veteran forward Trevor Booker.
- On January 30, 2018, the Los Angeles Clippers traded 5 time All-Star Blake Griffin, veteran center Willie Reed, and sophomore forward Brice Johnson to the Detroit Pistons for Tobias Harris, Avery Bradley, Boban Marjanović, a protected 2018 first-round draft pick, and a protected 2019 second-round draft pick.
- On February 3, 2018, the Chicago Bulls traded forward Nikola Mirotić to the New Orleans Pelicans in exchange of Ömer Aşık, Tony Allen, Jameer Nelson, and a protected 2018 first-round draft pick.
- On February 5, 2018, the Milwaukee Bucks acquired Tyler Zeller of the Brooklyn Nets for fellow guard Rashad Vaughn and a protected 2018 second-round draft pick.
- On February 7, 2018, the New York Knicks traded forward Willy Hernangómez to the Charlotte Hornets for center Johnny O'Bryant III, a 2020 second-round draft pick, and a 2021 second-round draft pick.
- On February 8, 2018, the Cleveland Cavaliers traded Isaiah Thomas, Channing Frye, and their 2018 first-round pick to the Los Angeles Lakers for Jordan Clarkson and Larry Nance Jr. The Cavaliers also participated in a three-team trade with the Utah Jazz and Sacramento Kings to acquire Rodney Hood and George Hill while trading Iman Shumpert and a 2020 second-round pick to the Kings, Jae Crowder and Derrick Rose (Rose was later waived and signed with the Minnesota Timberwolves) to the Jazz while the Kings also receive Joe Johnson from the Jazz. In addition, the Cavaliers traded Dwyane Wade back to the Miami Heat for a 2024 second-round pick.

=== Free agency ===
Free agency negotiations began on July 1. Players began signing on July 6, after the July moratorium ended.

=== Coaching changes ===
Coaching changes
In-season
Team	Outgoing coach	Incoming coach
Phoenix Suns	Earl Watson	Jay Triano (interim)
Memphis Grizzlies	David Fizdale	J. B. Bickerstaff (interim)
Milwaukee Bucks	Jason Kidd	Joe Prunty (interim)

==== Off-season ====
For the first time since the inauguration of the BAA, there would be no coaching changes going from the previous season to entering the regular season. In fact, the 536 days from Dave Joerger being fired as coach of the Memphis Grizzlies to the day the Phoenix Suns fired Earl Watson as head coach would be the longest period in NBA history without any coaching changes occur. The last time no head coaches were hired in the off-season occurred during the 1975–76 season.

==== In-season ====
- On October 22, 2017, the Phoenix Suns fired head coach Earl Watson and replaced him with the team's associate coach Jay Triano as interim head coach for the rest of the season.
- On November 27, 2017, the Memphis Grizzlies fired head coach David Fizdale and replaced him with the team's associate head coach J. B. Bickerstaff, removing the interim tag after the season concluded.
- On January 22, 2018, the Milwaukee Bucks fired head coach Jason Kidd and replaced him with the team's assistant head coach Joe Prunty as interim head coach for the rest of the season.

== Preseason ==
The preseason began on September 30 and ended on October 13.

=== International games ===
The Golden State Warriors and Minnesota Timberwolves played two preseason games in China, at Shenzhen on October 5 and Shanghai on October 8. Minnesota won the first game 111–97, while Golden State emerged victorious in the second one, 142–110.

== Regular season ==
The regular season began on October 17, 2017, and ended on April 11, 2018.

Eastern Conference

Atlantic Division	W	L	PCT	GB	Home	Road	Div	GP
c – Toronto Raptors	59	23	.720	–	34‍–‍7	25‍–‍16	12–4	82
x – Boston Celtics	55	27	.671	4.0	27‍–‍14	28‍–‍13	12–4	82
x – Philadelphia 76ers	52	30	.634	7.0	30‍–‍11	22‍–‍19	9–7	82
New York Knicks	29	53	.354	30.0	19‍–‍22	10‍–‍31	6–10	82
Brooklyn Nets	28	54	.341	31.0	15‍–‍26	13‍–‍28	1–15	82

Central Division	W	L	PCT	GB	Home	Road	Div	GP
y – Cleveland Cavaliers	50	32	.610	–	29‍–‍12	21‍–‍20	11–5	82
x – Indiana Pacers	48	34	.585	2.0	27‍–‍14	21‍–‍20	10–6	82
x – Milwaukee Bucks	44	38	.537	6.0	25‍–‍16	19‍–‍22	6–10	82
Detroit Pistons	39	43	.476	11.0	25‍–‍16	14‍–‍27	9–7	82
Chicago Bulls	27	55	.329	23.0	17‍–‍24	10‍–‍31	4–12	82

Southeast Division	W	L	PCT	GB	Home	Road	Div	GP
y – Miami Heat	44	38	.537	–	26‍–‍15	18‍–‍23	11–5	82
x – Washington Wizards	43	39	.524	1.0	23‍–‍18	20‍–‍21	8–8	82
Charlotte Hornets	36	46	.439	8.0	21‍–‍20	15‍–‍26	11–5	82
Orlando Magic	25	57	.305	19.0	17‍–‍24	8‍–‍33	5–11	82
Atlanta Hawks	24	58	.293	20.0	16‍–‍25	8‍–‍33	5–11	82

Western Conference

Northwest Division	W	L	PCT	GB	Home	Road	Div	GP
y – Portland Trail Blazers	49	33	.598	–	28‍–‍13	21‍–‍20	9–7	82
x – Oklahoma City Thunder	48	34	.585	1.0	27‍–‍14	21‍–‍20	5–11	82
x – Utah Jazz	48	34	.585	1.0	28‍–‍13	20‍–‍21	7–9	82
x – Minnesota Timberwolves	47	35	.573	2.0	30‍–‍11	17‍–‍24	10–6	82
Denver Nuggets	46	36	.561	3.0	31‍–‍10	15‍–‍26	9–7	82

Pacific Division	W	L	PCT	GB	Home	Road	Div	GP
y – Golden State Warriors	58	24	.707	–	29‍–‍12	29‍–‍12	13–3	82
Los Angeles Clippers	42	40	.512	16.0	22‍–‍19	20‍–‍21	12–4	82
Los Angeles Lakers	35	47	.427	23.0	20‍–‍21	15‍–‍26	6–10	82
Sacramento Kings	27	55	.329	31.0	14‍–‍27	13‍–‍28	5–11	82
Phoenix Suns	21	61	.256	37.0	10‍–‍31	11‍–‍30	4–12	82

Southwest Division	W	L	PCT	GB	Home	Road	Div	GP
z – Houston Rockets	65	17	.793	–	34‍–‍7	31‍–‍10	12–4	82
x – New Orleans Pelicans	48	34	.585	17.0	24‍–‍17	24‍–‍17	9–7	82
x – San Antonio Spurs	47	35	.573	18.0	33‍–‍8	14‍–‍27	9–7	82
Dallas Mavericks	24	58	.293	41.0	15‍–‍26	9‍–‍32	5–11	82
Memphis Grizzlies	22	60	.268	43.0	16‍–‍25	6‍–‍35	5–11	82

=== By conference ===
Eastern Conference
#	Team	W	L	PCT	GB	GP
1	c – Toronto Raptors *	59	23	.720	–	82
2	x – Boston Celtics	55	27	.671	4.0	82
3	x – Philadelphia 76ers	52	30	.634	7.0	82
4	y – Cleveland Cavaliers *	50	32	.610	9.0	82
5	x – Indiana Pacers	48	34	.585	11.0	82
6	y – Miami Heat *	44	38	.537	15.0	82
7	x – Milwaukee Bucks	44	38	.537	15.0	82
8	x – Washington Wizards	43	39	.524	16.0	82
9	Detroit Pistons	39	43	.476	20.0	82
10	Charlotte Hornets	36	46	.439	23.0	82
11	New York Knicks	29	53	.354	30.0	82
12	Brooklyn Nets	28	54	.341	31.0	82
13	Chicago Bulls	27	55	.329	32.0	82
14	Orlando Magic	25	57	.305	34.0	82
15	Atlanta Hawks	24	58	.293	35.0	82

Western Conference
#	Team	W	L	PCT	GB	GP
1	z – Houston Rockets *	65	17	.793	–	82
2	y – Golden State Warriors *	58	24	.707	7.0	82
3	y – Portland Trail Blazers *	49	33	.598	16.0	82
4	x – Oklahoma City Thunder	48	34	.585	17.0	82
5	x – Utah Jazz	48	34	.585	17.0	82
6	x – New Orleans Pelicans	48	34	.585	17.0	82
7	x – San Antonio Spurs	47	35	.573	18.0	82
8	x – Minnesota Timberwolves	47	35	.573	18.0	82
9	Denver Nuggets	46	36	.561	19.0	82
10	Los Angeles Clippers	42	40	.512	23.0	82
11	Los Angeles Lakers	35	47	.427	30.0	82
12	Sacramento Kings	27	55	.329	38.0	82
13	Dallas Mavericks	24	58	.293	41.0	82
14	Memphis Grizzlies	22	60	.268	43.0	82
15	Phoenix Suns	21	61	.256	44.0	82

Notes

- z – Clinched home court advantage for the entire playoffs
- c – Clinched home court advantage for the conference playoffs
- y – Clinched division title
- x – Clinched playoff spot
- * – Division leader

==== Tiebreakers ====
Eastern Conference

- Miami clinched #6 seed over Milwaukee based on head-to-head record (3–0).

Western Conference

- Oklahoma City, Utah, and New Orleans were seeded based on record in games against each other (OKC: 4–3, UTAH: 4–4, NO: 3–4).
- San Antonio clinched #7 seed over Minnesota based on head-to-head record (2–1).

=== International games ===
On August 9, 2017, the NBA announced that the Brooklyn Nets would play two regular season games at Mexico City Arena in Mexico City, Mexico. On December 7, the Nets played against the Oklahoma City Thunder and on December 9, they matched up against the Miami Heat. The Nets prevailed 100–95 over the Thunder in their first game, but lost to the Heat 101–89 in their second game.

On August 10, 2017, the NBA announced that the Philadelphia 76ers would play the Boston Celtics at The O2 Arena in London, United Kingdom on January 11, 2018. The Celtics won the game 114–103.

== Playoffs ==
The 2018 NBA playoffs began on April 14, 2018, ESPN aired the 2018 Eastern Conference Finals and TNT aired the 2018 Western Conference Finals. For the first time since 1979 both Conference Finals series went to a deciding Game 7. The season ended with the 2018 NBA Finals which began on May 31, 2018, and ended on June 8, 2018, on ABC.

=== Bracket ===
First round	Conference semifinals
E1	Toronto*	4
E8	Washington	2
E1	Toronto*	0
E4	Cleveland*	4
E4	Cleveland*	4
E5	Indiana	3
Eastern Conference
E3	Philadelphia	4
E6	Miami*	1
E3	Philadelphia	1
E2	Boston	4
E2	Boston	4
E7	Milwaukee	3
W1	Houston*	4
W8	Minnesota	1
W1	Houston*	4
W5	Utah	1
W4	Oklahoma City	2
W5	Utah	4
Western Conference
W3	Portland*	0
W6	New Orleans	4
W6	New Orleans	1
W2	Golden State*	4
W2	Golden State*	4
W7	San Antonio	1

Conference finals
E4	Cleveland*	4
E2	Boston	3
W1	Houston*	3
W2	Golden State*	4

NBA Finals
E4	Cleveland*	0
W2	Golden State*	4

- * Division winner
- Bold Series winner
- Italic Team with home-court advantage

== Statistics ==
=== Individual statistic leaders ===
Category	Player	Team	Statistic
Points per game	James Harden	Houston Rockets	30.4
Rebounds per game	Andre Drummond	Detroit Pistons	16.0
Assists per game	Russell Westbrook	Oklahoma City Thunder	10.3
Steals per game	Victor Oladipo	Indiana Pacers	2.4
Blocks per game	Anthony Davis	New Orleans Pelicans	2.6
Turnovers per game	DeMarcus Cousins	New Orleans Pelicans	5.0
Fouls per game	DeMarcus Cousins	New Orleans Pelicans	3.8
Minutes per game	LeBron James	Cleveland Cavaliers	36.9
FG%	Clint Capela	Houston Rockets	65.2%
FT%	Stephen Curry	Golden State Warriors	92.2%
3FG%	Darren Collison	Indiana Pacers	46.8%
Efficiency per game	James Harden	Houston Rockets	29.87
Double-doubles	Karl-Anthony Towns	Minnesota Timberwolves	68
Triple-doubles	Russell Westbrook	Oklahoma City Thunder	25

=== Individual game highs ===
Category	Player	Team	Statistic
Points	James Harden	Houston Rockets	60
Rebounds	Dwight Howard	Charlotte Hornets	30
Assists	Rajon Rondo	New Orleans Pelicans	25
Steals	Lou Williams	Los Angeles Clippers	10
Blocks	Anthony Davis	New Orleans Pelicans	10
Three pointers	Stephen Curry	Golden State Warriors	10
Three pointers	Kemba Walker	Charlotte Hornets	10

=== Team statistic leaders ===
Category	Team	Statistic
Points per game	Golden State Warriors	113.5
Rebounds per game	Philadelphia 76ers	47.4
Assists per game	Golden State Warriors	29.3
Steals per game	Oklahoma City Thunder	9.1
Blocks per game	Golden State Warriors	7.5
Turnovers per game	Philadelphia 76ers	15.9
FG%	Golden State Warriors	50.3%
FT%	Golden State Warriors	81.5%
3FG%	Golden State Warriors	39.1%
+/−	Houston Rockets	+8.5

== Awards ==
=== Yearly awards ===
Awards were presented at the NBA Awards ceremony, which were held on June 25. Finalists for voted awards were announced during the playoffs and winners were presented at the award ceremony. The All-NBA Teams were announced in advance in order for teams to have all the necessary information to make off-season preparations.

2017–18 NBA awards
Award	Recipient(s)	Runner(s)-up/Finalists
Most Valuable Player	James Harden (Houston Rockets)	Anthony Davis (New Orleans Pelicans); LeBron James (Cleveland Cavaliers)
Defensive Player of the Year	Rudy Gobert (Utah Jazz)	Anthony Davis (New Orleans Pelicans); Joel Embiid (Philadelphia 76ers)
Rookie of the Year	Ben Simmons (Philadelphia 76ers)	Donovan Mitchell (Utah Jazz); Jayson Tatum (Boston Celtics)
Sixth Man of the Year	Lou Williams (Los Angeles Clippers)	Eric Gordon (Houston Rockets); Fred VanVleet (Toronto Raptors)
Most Improved Player	Victor Oladipo (Indiana Pacers)	Clint Capela (Houston Rockets); Spencer Dinwiddie (Brooklyn Nets)
Coach of the Year	Dwane Casey (Toronto Raptors)	Quin Snyder (Utah Jazz); Brad Stevens (Boston Celtics)
Executive of the Year	Daryl Morey (Houston Rockets)	
NBA Sportsmanship Award	Kemba Walker (Charlotte Hornets)	
J. Walter Kennedy Citizenship Award	J. J. Barea (Dallas Mavericks)	
Twyman–Stokes Teammate of the Year Award	Jamal Crawford (Minnesota Timberwolves)	
Community Assist Award	Kevin Durant (Golden State Warriors)	

- All-NBA First Team:
  - F LeBron James, Cleveland Cavaliers
  - F Kevin Durant, Golden State Warriors
  - C Anthony Davis, New Orleans Pelicans
  - G James Harden, Houston Rockets
  - G Damian Lillard, Portland Trail Blazers
- All-NBA Second Team:
  - F Giannis Antetokounmpo, Milwaukee Bucks
  - F LaMarcus Aldridge, San Antonio Spurs
  - C Joel Embiid, Philadelphia 76ers
  - G Russell Westbrook, Oklahoma City Thunder
  - G DeMar DeRozan, Toronto Raptors
- All-NBA Third Team:
  - F Jimmy Butler, Minnesota Timberwolves
  - F Paul George, Oklahoma City Thunder
  - C Karl-Anthony Towns, Minnesota Timberwolves
  - G Stephen Curry, Golden State Warriors
  - G Victor Oladipo, Indiana Pacers

- NBA All-Defensive First Team:
  - F Robert Covington, Philadelphia 76ers
  - F Anthony Davis, New Orleans Pelicans
  - C Rudy Gobert, Utah Jazz
  - G Victor Oladipo, Indiana Pacers
  - G Jrue Holiday, New Orleans Pelicans
- NBA All-Defensive Second Team:
  - F Draymond Green, Golden State Warriors
  - F Al Horford, Boston Celtics
  - C Joel Embiid, Philadelphia 76ers
  - G Jimmy Butler, Minnesota Timberwolves
  - G Dejounte Murray, San Antonio Spurs

- NBA All-Rookie First Team:
  - Kyle Kuzma, Los Angeles Lakers
  - Lauri Markkanen, Chicago Bulls
  - Jayson Tatum, Boston Celtics
  - Donovan Mitchell, Utah Jazz
  - Ben Simmons, Philadelphia 76ers
- NBA All-Rookie Second Team:
  - John Collins, Atlanta Hawks
  - Josh Jackson, Phoenix Suns
  - Dennis Smith Jr., Dallas Mavericks
  - Lonzo Ball, Los Angeles Lakers
  - Bogdan Bogdanović, Sacramento Kings

=== Players of the Week ===
The following players were named the Eastern and Western Conference Players of the Week.

Week	Eastern Conference	Western Conference	Ref.
October 17–22	Giannis Antetokounmpo (Milwaukee Bucks) (1/1)	James Harden (Houston Rockets) (1/5)	
October 23–29	Victor Oladipo (Indiana Pacers) (1/3)	DeMarcus Cousins (New Orleans Pelicans) (1/1)	
October 30 – November 5	Kristaps Porziņģis (New York Knicks) (1/1)	James Harden (Houston Rockets) (2/5)	
November 6–12	Tobias Harris (Detroit Pistons) (1/1)	Nikola Jokić (Denver Nuggets) (1/2)	
November 13–19	DeMar DeRozan (Toronto Raptors) (1/5)	Karl-Anthony Towns (Minnesota Timberwolves) (1/1)	
November 20–26	Goran Dragić (Miami Heat) (1/2)	Anthony Davis (New Orleans Pelicans) (1/2)	
November 27 – December 3	LeBron James (Cleveland Cavaliers) (1/4)	James Harden (Houston Rockets) (3/5)	
December 4–10	Victor Oladipo (Indiana Pacers) (2/3)	Kevin Durant (Golden State Warriors) (1/1)	
December 11–17	LeBron James (Cleveland Cavaliers) (2/4)	Chris Paul (Houston Rockets) (1/1)	
December 18–24	DeMar DeRozan (Toronto Raptors) (2/5)	Russell Westbrook (Oklahoma City Thunder) (1/2)	
December 25–31	Bradley Beal (Washington Wizards) (1/1)	Lou Williams (Los Angeles Clippers) (1/2)	
January 1–7	DeMar DeRozan (Toronto Raptors) (3/5)	Stephen Curry (Golden State Warriors) (1/2)	
January 8–14	Goran Dragić (Miami Heat) (2/2)	Lou Williams (Los Angeles Clippers) (2/2)	
January 15–21	Joel Embiid (Philadelphia 76ers) (1/2)	Damian Lillard (Portland Trail Blazers) (1/3)	
January 22–28	Khris Middleton (Milwaukee Bucks) (1/1)	Stephen Curry (Golden State Warriors) (2/2)	
January 29 – February 4	Andre Drummond (Detroit Pistons) (1/1)	James Harden (Houston Rockets) (4/5)	
February 5–11	Joel Embiid (Philadelphia 76ers) (2/2)	James Harden (Houston Rockets) (5/5)	
February 26 – March 4	DeMar DeRozan (Toronto Raptors) (4/5)	Anthony Davis (New Orleans Pelicans) (2/2)	
March 5–11	DeMar DeRozan (Toronto Raptors) (5/5)	Damian Lillard (Portland Trail Blazers) (2/3)	
March 12–18	LeBron James (Cleveland Cavaliers) (3/4)	Russell Westbrook (Oklahoma City Thunder) (2/2)	
March 19–25	LeBron James (Cleveland Cavaliers) (4/4)	LaMarcus Aldridge (San Antonio Spurs) (1/1)	
March 26 – April 1	Victor Oladipo (Indiana Pacers) (3/3)	Damian Lillard (Portland Trail Blazers) (3/3)	
April 2–8	Ben Simmons (Philadelphia 76ers) (1/1)	Nikola Jokić (Denver Nuggets) (2/2)	

=== Players of the Month ===
The following players were named the Eastern and Western Conference Players of the Month.

Month	Eastern Conference	Western Conference	Ref.
October/November	LeBron James (Cleveland Cavaliers) (1/4)	James Harden (Houston Rockets) (1/1)	
December	LeBron James (Cleveland Cavaliers) (2/4)	Russell Westbrook (Oklahoma City Thunder) (1/1)	
January	DeMar DeRozan (Toronto Raptors) (1/1)	Stephen Curry (Golden State Warriors) (1/1)	
February	LeBron James (Cleveland Cavaliers) (3/4)	Anthony Davis (New Orleans Pelicans) (1/2)	
March/April	LeBron James (Cleveland Cavaliers) (4/4)	Anthony Davis (New Orleans Pelicans) (2/2)	

=== Rookies of the Month ===
The following players were named the Eastern and Western Conference Rookies of the Month.

Month	Eastern Conference	Western Conference	Ref.
October/November	Ben Simmons (Philadelphia 76ers) (1/4)	Kyle Kuzma (Los Angeles Lakers) (1/1)	
December	Jayson Tatum (Boston Celtics) (1/1)	Donovan Mitchell (Utah Jazz) (1/4)	
January	Ben Simmons (Philadelphia 76ers) (2/4)	Donovan Mitchell (Utah Jazz) (2/4)	
February	Ben Simmons (Philadelphia 76ers) (3/4)	Donovan Mitchell (Utah Jazz) (3/4)	
March/April	Ben Simmons (Philadelphia 76ers) (4/4)	Donovan Mitchell (Utah Jazz) (4/4)	

=== Coaches of the Month ===
The following coaches were named the Eastern and Western Conference Coaches of the Month.

Month	Eastern Conference	Western Conference	Ref.
October/November	Brad Stevens (Boston Celtics) (1/1)	Mike D'Antoni (Houston Rockets) (1/2)	
December	Dwane Casey (Toronto Raptors) (1/1)	Steve Kerr (Golden State Warriors) (1/1)	
January	Erik Spoelstra (Miami Heat) (1/1)	Terry Stotts (Portland Trail Blazers) (1/1)	
February	Scott Brooks (Washington Wizards) (1/1)	Mike D'Antoni (Houston Rockets) (2/2)	
March/April	Brett Brown (Philadelphia 76ers) (1/1)	Quin Snyder (Utah Jazz) (1/1)	

== Arenas ==
- This was the Detroit Pistons' first season at Little Caesars Arena after playing at The Palace of Auburn Hills from 1988 to 2017. The team played their first game there on October 4, 2017, in a preseason game against the Charlotte Hornets, the first regular season game there was played on October 18, 2017, also against the Hornets. This also marked the first time the Pistons have regularly played in the city of Detroit since 1978, and the first time they have shared an arena with the NHL's Detroit Red Wings since 1961.
- This was the Milwaukee Bucks' final season at the Bradley Center, their home since 1988. The team played its final regular season game there on April 9 against the Orlando Magic, and the final playoff game there was played on April 26 against the Boston Celtics. The team moved into the new Fiserv Forum prior to the start of the 2018–19 NBA season. The team played a "Return to the MECCA" game at the UW–Milwaukee Panther Arena (the former Milwaukee or "MECCA" Arena, their home from 1968 until 1988) on October 26 against the Celtics as part of the team's 50th season celebration.
- The Washington Wizards home arena, the Verizon Center, was renamed Capital One Arena.
- Maple Leaf Sports & Entertainment, owners of the Toronto Raptors, announced that the Air Canada Centre would be renamed Scotiabank Arena at the end of the 2017–18 season.

== Uniform changes ==
As part of a new partnership with Nike to be the league's official jersey supplier, the NBA eliminated "home" and "away" uniform designations. In their place, teams' white uniforms have been designated as "Association" uniforms, and their color uniforms have been designated as "Icon" uniforms. Teams also unveiled two alternative uniforms, designated as "Statement" and "City" uniforms.

== Media ==
This was the second season of a nine-year deals with ABC, ESPN, TNT, and NBA TV.

The Chicago Bulls experienced a mid-season change in their broadcast partner due to the Cumulus Media Chapter 11 bankruptcy filing nulling and voiding many broadcasting agreements. The team's games moved from Cumulus's WLS to Entercom's WSCR on February 3, 2018.

== Notable occurrences ==
- On July 1, 2017, the NBA's new collective bargaining agreement formed new health panels to prevent a Reggie Lewis situation from happening with the salary cap.
- On July 6, 2017, the NBA unveiled an update to its logo, featuring new typography and a modified color scheme.
- The regular season started eight days earlier than the previous season. This move by the NBA aims for fewer games on consecutive nights, even fewer than the previous season which had already reached an all-time low to help address teams that were "resting" their superstars.
- The NBA decreased the maximum number of timeouts in a regulation game from 18 to 14. The three team timeouts during the last two minutes of the game were also decreased to two per team in the last three minutes to improve the flow and pace of the game.
- The trade deadline was moved from four days after the NBA All-Star Game to ten days before it, so teams can settle their rosters before the All-Star break.
- Free-throw shooters were assessed a delay-of-game violation if they venture outside of the three-point line in between attempts.
- The NBA also added two-way contracted players, signifying an increasing partnership between the NBA and the NBA Developmental League (which, despite its rebranding with PepsiCo sponsorship, is legally listed as the Developmental League in the collective bargaining agreement).
- Referees can now assess dangerous closeouts of defenders to jump shooters with little space to land for a technical or a flagrant foul. Informally dubbed as the "Zaza Pachulia rule". Also, officials can now assess if a player is in a shooting motion when determining if a perimeter foul is a shooting or a common foul. The type of foul was determined on the sequencing of the player's movement if the foul happens before or after the player starts a shooting motion. Additionally, they can also assess an offensive foul if an offensive player intentionally lunges into the defender or locks arms to create contact, a rule informally dubbed as the "Harden rule".
- On September 28, 2017, the NBA board of governors approved the changes to the draft lottery system to discourage teams from losing on purpose. Starting with the 2018–19 NBA season, the teams with the three worst records had equal odds at the #1 pick. In addition, the revised draft lottery consisted of selecting the top four teams instead of the usual three that occurred for over two decades. The approval for the change was nearly unanimous, with only the Oklahoma City Thunder voting against the change and the Dallas Mavericks abstaining from voting.
- On October 3, 2017, the NBA and NBPA announced the changes to the NBA All-Star Game format. The vote leaders for each conferences were assigned as team captains and were able to select players from the rest of the starters and the reserves, regardless of the conference they play in, to form their own teams. The newly formed teams also played for a charity of choice to help the games remain competitive. This marked the first time, the conferences did not play against each other since the inaugural All-Star game. Selection process remained the same.
- On October 17, 2017, during the season opener with the Cleveland Cavaliers against the Boston Celtics, Gordon Hayward landed awkwardly on his ankle with his behind after attempting an alley-oop off a pass from Kyrie Irving. He suffered a dislocated ankle and a fractured tibia five minutes into the game in his debut as a Celtic.
- On October 18, 2017, Brooklyn Nets point guard Jeremy Lin fell to the ground hard after making a layup when playing the Indiana Pacers, causing him to miss the entire season. He suffered a ruptured patellar tendon of his right knee.
- That same day, in the season opening game for the Portland Trail Blazers and Phoenix Suns, the Trail Blazers would defeat the Suns 124–76 in what would be the greatest deficit for a season-opening game in league history.
- On October 25, 2017, the Cleveland Cavaliers' LeBron James, normally a frontcourt player, recorded his 56th career triple-double and 1st career triple-double as starting point guard.
- On October 28, 2017, Oklahoma City Thunder point guard Russell Westbrook became the first player in NBA history to record a triple double against all 29 opposing teams.
- On November 3, 2017, LeBron James scored 57 points for the night and his 29,000th career point, becoming the youngest player, and just the seventh overall, to reach that mark (32 years, 309 days). LeBron James also passed both Kevin Garnett for 12th on the NBA's all-time field goals list (with 10,506 career field goals to his name) and passed John Havlicek for 11th on the NBA's all-time field goals list with 10,514 career field goals.
- On November 7, 2017, Ben Simmons became the only player in NBA history with at least 170 points, 100 rebounds and 80 assists in his team's first 10 games.
- On November 7, 2017, the Sacramento Kings set a record for most points scored before a starter scored. The King's bench scored the team's first 29 points before Willie Cauley-Stein scored a free throw at 4:08 of the second quarter. The previous record was held by the Milwaukee Bucks at 23 points set on April 5, 2011, against the Orlando Magic.
- On November 11, 2017, Lonzo Ball became the youngest player in NBA history to record a triple-double at 20 years and 15 days old. He recorded 19 points, 13 assists and 12 rebounds. The previous record holder was LeBron James' at 20 years and 20 days old.
- On November 14, 2017, the Boston Celtics became the first team in NBA history to win at least 13 straight games after starting the season 0–2. The winning streak ended at 16 when they lost to the Miami Heat on November 22, 2017.
- On November 15, 2017, the Atlanta Hawks set a franchise record for their largest margin of victory in a win against the Sacramento Kings at 46 points, 126–80. The previous record was set on February 12, 1965, at a 44-point margin when the St. Louis Hawks beat the Baltimore Bullets, 144–100.
- On November 28, 2017, LeBron James was ejected for the first time in his career after contesting a non-call following a drive to the basket against the Miami Heat. He had gone 1,081 games without disqualification.
- On December 1, 2017, Donovan Mitchell of the Utah Jazz set a rookie franchise record after scoring 41 points against the New Orleans Pelicans. So far, it is the highest scoring game for a rookie this season.
- On December 1, 2017, Stephen Curry of the Golden State Warriors passed Jason Kidd for eighth place on the NBA's all-time list for three-pointers made.
- On December 4, 2017, Stephen Curry hit his 2,000th career three-pointer. He became the fastest to reach the milestone at 597 games, 225 games fewer than Ray Allen, the previous record-holder.
- On December 11, 2017, Carmelo Anthony of the Oklahoma City Thunder passed Vince Carter for 22nd on the NBA all-time scoring list.
- On December 14, 2017, Vince Carter moved to 50th all-time in career steals, passing Tim Hardaway in the process.
- On December 16, 2017, Miami Heat head coach Erik Spoelstra surpassed Pat Riley for most wins in franchise history with his 455th career win.
- On December 18, 2017, during halftime against the Golden State Warriors, the Los Angeles Lakers held a ceremony to retire both of Kobe Bryant's jersey numbers in 8 and 24 in the Staples Center.
- That same day, the Naismith Basketball Hall of Fame updates the length for players, coaches, and referees eligible for entry into the Hall of Fame to decrease by three years, allowing names like Steve Nash, Chauncey Billups, Ray Allen, and Jermaine O'Neal to potentially enter earlier than originally expected.
- On December 25, 2017, in a win against the Cleveland Cavaliers, Draymond Green became the sixth player in NBA history to record a triple double on Christmas Day.
- On January 1, 2018, DeMar DeRozan recorded the first 50-point performance of the year against the Milwaukee Bucks. He also broke the Toronto Raptors' franchise record for points with 52.
- On January 4, 2018, Carmelo Anthony passed Patrick Ewing for 21st on the NBA all-time scoring list.
- On January 8, 2018, Kyle Korver of the Cleveland Cavaliers passed Paul Pierce in career 3-pointers made for fourth place.
- On January 15, 2018, Lauri Markkanen of the Chicago Bulls became the fastest player to reach 100 3-pointers. He did it in 41 games, beating Damian Lillard's record of 44 games.
- On January 23, 2018, LeBron James scored his 30,000th point at the age of 33 years old and 24 days surpassing Kobe Bryant as the youngest player to do so, as well as being just the 7th player to join the 30,000-point club. Additionally, he became the first player in NBA history with 30,000 points, 7,000 rebounds and 7,000 assists.
- On January 27, 2018, Carmelo Anthony became the 21st player in NBA history to reach 25,000 points.
- On January 28, 2018, Manu Ginóbili and Vince Carter, marked the first time in NBA history that two 40 year-old players scored 15 points or more in the same game with Ginóbili scoring 15 points and Carter scoring 21 points.
- On January 30, 2018, James Harden becomes the first player in NBA history to record a triple-double with at least 60 points scored in a game, he recorded 60 points, 10 rebounds and 11 assists. This marks the highest scored points for a player with a triple-double. He also set a franchise scoring record that was previously held by Calvin Murphy.
- On February 5, 2018, Dirk Nowitzki became the 6th player in NBA history to reach 50,000 minutes played. He also surpassed Elvin Hayes for top 5 in the process. Coincidentally, his name was incorrectly spelled as "Nowitkzi" on his jersey.
- On February 11, 2018, during halftime against the Cleveland Cavaliers, the Boston Celtics held a ceremony to retire Paul Pierce's jersey number 34 in TD Garden rafters. This was the first time since 1994–95 both Celtics and Lakers have retired their jersey number.
- On February 12, 2018, T. J. McConnell of the Philadelphia 76ers recorded a triple-double while coming off the bench, this marks the first time in franchise history that a reserve recorded a triple-double. He recorded 10 points, 11 assists and 10 rebounds while also adding a career-high 6 steals.
- On February 15, 2018, Nikola Jokić of the Denver Nuggets recorded the fastest triple-double in NBA history, with his feat in fourteen minutes and 33 seconds, beating previous record holder Jim Tucker's time of seventeen minutes set in 1955.
- On February 27, 2018, LeBron James became the only player in NBA history with at least 30,000 points, 8,000 rebounds and 8,000 assists.
- On February 28, 2018, Dirk Nowitzki became the sixth player in NBA history to reach 31,000 career points.
- On March 6, 2018, Carmelo Anthony passed Jerry West and moved to 20th on the NBA all-time scoring list.
- On March 18, 2018, Carmelo Anthony passed Reggie Miller and moved to 19th on the NBA all-time scoring list.
- On March 19, 2018, Vince Carter passed Patrick Ewing for 22nd on the NBA all-time scoring list.
- That same day, the Miami Heat beat the Denver Nuggets in a classic double-overtime, scoring 149–141 and setting a franchise record for most points in a game. This is also the highest score made a team in this season, surpassing 148 points made by Houston Rockets and Oklahoma City Thunder earlier in the season.
- On March 21, 2018, Dwight Howard became the ninth player in NBA history to record at least 30 points and 30 rebounds in a game. He led the Charlotte Hornets to victory against the Brooklyn Nets with 32 points and 30 rebounds.
- That same day, the San Antonio Spurs defeated the Washington Wizards, 98–90, to win their 42nd game of the season to clinch 21 consecutive winning seasons.
- On March 22, 2018, the Charlotte Hornets beat the Memphis Grizzlies with a margin of 61 points, the most in the last 20 years. It was also a Hornets franchise record, the final scores were 140–79.
- On March 30, 2018, LeBron James broke Michael Jordan's record for consecutive games with at least 10 points. James scored in double digits for 867 consecutive games and finished the game with 27. On the same game, he also tied Kobe Bryant's record for third-most 20-point games in NBA history with 941.
- On April 3, 2018, the Los Angeles Clippers defeated the San Antonio Spurs 113–110 to give the Spurs their 33rd loss of the season, thus ending their record streak of 18 consecutive 50 win seasons.
- On April 4, 2018 Wayne Ellington of the Miami Heat made his 207th three-pointer of the season as a reserve, setting an NBA record for the most three-pointers made in a season by a player off the bench. The previous record of 206 three-pointers was set by Eric Gordon last year.
- For the first time since the 1996-97 NBA season, two teams played their last game against each other for the 8th and final spot in the playoffs. The Minnesota Timberwolves defeated the Denver Nuggets 112–106 in overtime to clinch the final playoff seed in the west. This also ended Minnesota's 13-year drought without a playoff appearance having last played in 2003–04 season.
- On April 6, 2018, LeBron James became youngest player to score 31,000 career points at 33 years and 97 days and the 7th player in NBA history to do so. He achieved the record by finishing 44 points, 11 rebounds, and 11 assists in a losing effort against Philadelphia 76ers, 132–130.
- On April 11, 2018, Markelle Fultz became the youngest player in NBA history to record a triple-double at 19 years and 317 days old. He recorded 13 points, 10 rebounds, and 10 assists, surpassing the record held by Lonzo Ball earlier in the season.
- That same day, Russell Westbrook became the only player in NBA history to average a triple-double in consecutive and multiple seasons.

== See also ==
- List of NBA regular season records
