= List of Portland Trail Blazers executives =

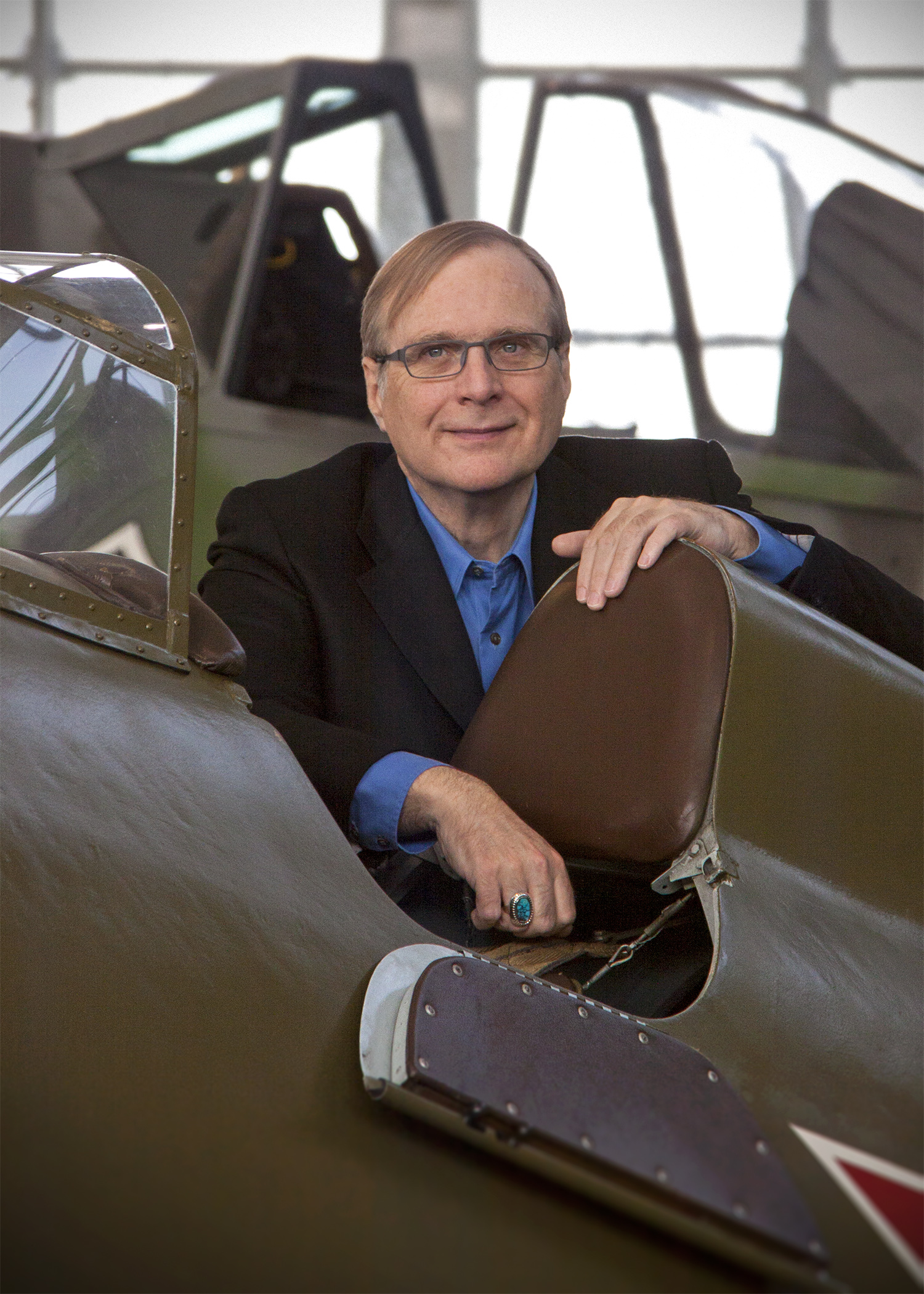
Paul Allen owned the Trail Blazers until his death in 2018.

This is a list of Portland Trail Blazers executives, since the team's foundation in 1970.

== Ownership ==
| Year | Principal Owner | Others | Notes |
|---|---|---|---|
| 1970–1975 | Herman Sarkowsky | Robert Schmertz (1970–1972); Larry Weinberg | Plus other minority owners |
| 1975–1988 | Larry Weinberg | | Plus other minority owners |
| 1988–2018 | Paul Allen | Vice-chair Bert Kolde | through Vulcan Sports and Entertainment |
| 2018–2026 | Jody Allen | | under Paul Allen estate |
| 2026–present | Thomas Dundon | | Plus other minority owners |

== Executive management ==
| Year | Team President | Executive VP/COO | Notes |
|---|---|---|---|
| 1970–1975 | Herman Sarkowsky | | |
| 1975–1987 | Larry Weinberg | Harry Glickman | |
| 1987–1994 | Harry Glickman | | |
| 1994–1995 | Bob Whitsitt/Marshall Glickman | | |
| 1995–2000 | Bob Whitsitt | | |
| 2000–2001 | Bob Whitsitt | Harry Hutt | |
| 2001–2003 | Bob Whitsitt | Erin Hubert | |
| 2003–2006 | Steve Patterson | | |
| 2006–2007 | Steve Patterson | Mike Golub | |
| 2007 | Tod Leiweke (interim) | Mike Golub | |
| 2007–2008 | Larry Miller | Mike Golub | |
| 2008–2012 | Larry Miller | Sarah Mensah | |
| 2012–present | Chris McGowan | | |

== Basketball operations ==
| Years | General Manager | VP of Basketball Ops | Assistant GM | Director of Player Personnel | Notes |
|---|---|---|---|---|---|
| 1970–1981 | Harry Glickman | – | – | Stu Inman | |
| 1981–1986 | Stu Inman | – | – | – | |
| 1986–1989 | Jon Spoelstra | – | Bucky Buckwalter | – | |
| 1989–1990 | – | Bucky Buckwalter | – | Brad Greenberg | |
| 1990–1994 | Geoff Petrie | Bucky Buckwalter | – | Brad Greenberg | Buckwalter won NBA Executive of the Year in 1991 |
| 1994–1995 | Bob Whitsitt | Bucky Buckwalter | – | Brad Greenberg | |
| 1995–1996 | Bob Whitsitt | Bucky Buckwalter | Jim Paxson | – | |
| 1996–1998 | Bob Whitsitt | – | Jim Paxson | – | |
| 1998–2003 | Bob Whitsitt | – | Mark Warkentien | – | |
| 2003–2004 | John Nash | – | – | Mark Warkentein | |
| 2004–2006 | John Nash | – | – | Kevin Pritchard | |
| 2006–2007 | Steve Patterson | – | Kevin Pritchard | – | |
| 2007 | Tod Leiweke (interim) | – | Kevin Pritchard | – | |
| 2007–2010 | Kevin Pritchard | – | Tom Penn | – | |
| 2010–2011 | Rich Cho | – | – | – | |
| 2011–2012 | Chad Buchanan (interim) | – | – | – | |
| 2012–2021 | Neil Olshey | – | – | – | |
| 2021–present | Joe Cronin | – | Andrae Patterson | – | |
