= Leiweke =

Leiweke is a surname. Notable people with the surname include:

- Tim Leiweke (born 1957), American businessman
- Tod Leiweke (born 1960), American businessman
