= Kevin Pritchard =

American basketball executive (born 1967)

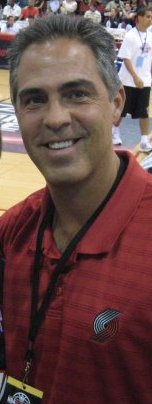

Indiana Pacers
- Title: President of basketball operations
- League: NBA

Personal information
- Born: July 18, 1967 (age 59) Bloomington, Indiana, U.S.
- Listed height: 6 ft 3 in (1.91 m)
- Listed weight: 180 lb (82 kg)

Career information
- High school: Edison (Tulsa, Oklahoma)
- College: Kansas (1986–1990)
- NBA draft: 1990: 2nd round, 34th overall pick
- Drafted by: Golden State Warriors
- Playing career: 1990–1998
- Position: Point guard
- Number: 2, 12, 11, 14

Career history

Playing
- 1990–1991: Golden State Warriors
- 1991–1992: Boston Celtics
- 1992–1993: Cáceres CB
- 1993–1994: Pfizer Reggio Calabria
- 1994–1995: Quad City Thunder
- 1995: Philadelphia 76ers
- 1995: Miami Heat
- 1995–1996: Quad City Thunder
- 1996: Washington Bullets
- 1996–1997: Bayer Leverkusen

Career highlights
- All-CBA First Team (1995); NCAA champion (1988)
- Stats at NBA.com
- Stats at Basketball Reference
Medals
Men's basketball
Representing United States
FIBA U19 World Championship
Silver medal – second place	1987 Bormio	Team competition

Kevin Lee Pritchard (born July 18, 1967) is an American basketball executive, and a former player and coach, who is currently the president of basketball operations for the Indiana Pacers. Pritchard played 4 seasons in the NBA as a player, and was also the general manager of the Portland Trail Blazers, and the Indiana Pacers.

== College career ==
Pritchard played college basketball for the Kansas Jayhawks, where, as a sophomore, he was the starting point guard on the Jayhawks team that defeated the Oklahoma Sooners for the 1988 NCAA Division I men's basketball tournament championship.

== Professional career ==
Pritchard was drafted by the Golden State Warriors of the National Basketball Association as the 34th overall pick in 1990. He had a six-year NBA career spanning five teams: the Warriors, the Boston Celtics, the Philadelphia 76ers, the Miami Heat, and the Washington Bullets. He was first player signed to the Vancouver Grizzlies in 1995, although he was released before getting an opportunity to play a game for them.

Pritchard played for the Quad City Thunder of the Continental Basketball Association (CBA) from 1994 to 1996. He was selected to the All-CBA First Team in 1995.

Pritchard's playing career also included a stint with Caceres C.B. in Spain, Pfizer Reggio Calabria in Italy in 1993–1994, and Bayer Leverkusen in Germany 1996–1997. He retired from playing in 1998.

== Executive career ==
=== Early coaching and management career ===
After a year working outside of basketball, Pritchard became the coach and general manager of the Kansas City Knights of the ABA, which he led to a championship in 2002. Later, he was hired by San Antonio Spurs general manager R. C. Buford to be a scout in the Spurs' organization, and two years later was hired by the Portland Trail Blazers as director of player personnel.

In 2005, when the Trail Blazers fired head coach Maurice Cheeks, they named Pritchard as his interim replacement.

=== Portland Trail Blazers ===
In the 2006 off-season, the team fired John Nash, giving Steve Patterson the dual role of general manager and president, while Pritchard was promoted to assistant general manager. In 2007, Patterson resigned, and on March 29, Pritchard was named as the team's general manager.

In December 2008, the Blazers attempted to block other NBA teams from signing Darius Miles solely for the purpose of negatively impacting the Blazers' salary cap situation. Miles ended up signing with the Memphis Grizzlies.

In the summer of 2009, the Blazers added to their core of young talent by signing veterans Andre Miller and Juwan Howard to free agent contracts. The 2009-10 Blazers suffered a historic level of injuries to key players, yet the team still won 50 games and returned to the playoffs.

Pritchard was relieved of his general manager duties on June 24, 2010. About one hour before the 2010 NBA draft, Kevin Pritchard was notified by Paul Allen that he had been fired, but wanted to make it clear that he needed to stay for the draft. Pritchard made a trade and two draft selections, which satisfied Trail Blazer team officials.

Many people expected the release of Pritchard to take place, as they felt the firing of Tom Penn, who was the assistant general manager, was a "drive-by" warning for Pritchard. Joe Freeman, of The Oregonian newspaper, broke this story early in the four o'clock hour of draft day to "Trail Blazers Courtside", an official Trail Blazer show offering live draft day coverage. It was reported that the Trail Blazers officials told the show's hosts to stop talking about Pritchard immediately. Allen's plan was to announce the firing the next day, but word got to the media and the Blazers were forced to address the situation.

In a press conference after, team President Larry Miller fielded all questions. No reasons were given as to why Pritchard was fired. Pritchard authored an open letter to Blazers' fans in which he thanked Paul Allen and the Blazers for the opportunity to help turn around the team.

=== Indiana Pacers ===
In July 2011, Pritchard joined the Indiana Pacers to become their director of player personnel. Later on, he was promoted to general manager in June 2012 to replace David Morway. On May 1, 2017, Pritchard took over the role of president of basketball operations, while retaining his general manager duties, when Larry Bird resigned.

== Head coaching record ==
Legend
Regular season	G	Games coached	W	Games won	L	Games lost	W–L %	Win–loss %
Playoffs	PG	Playoff games	PW	Playoff wins	PL	Playoff losses	PW–L %	Playoff win–loss %

Team	Year	G	W	L	W–L%	Finish	PG	PW	PL	PW–L%	Result
Portland	2004–05	27	5	22	.185	4th in Northwest	—	—	—	—	Missed Playoffs
Career		27	5	22	.185		—	—	—	—	
