= Steve Patterson (sports executive) =

American sports executive (born 1958)

Steve Patterson (born 1958 in Beaver Dam, Wisconsin) is an American former sports executive. He most recently served as the president and CEO of the Arizona Coyotes of the National Hockey League (NHL). Patterson is the former athletic director of the University of Texas, and the former president and general manager of the Portland Trail Blazers of the National Basketball Association (NBA).

Patterson attended the University of Texas, graduating with honors with a bachelor's degree in business administration in 1980. He graduated from UT's law school in 1984. In 1989, he replaced his father Ray as general manager of the Houston Rockets.

Patterson joined the Portland Trail Blazers as team's president in June 2003. He became the general manager after John Nash's contract was not renewed in May 2006, and served in both roles until resigning on March 1, 2007.

Patterson had previously worked as senior vice president and chief development officer of the Houston Texans of the National Football League (NFL), also as governor, president and general manager of the Houston Aeros of the International Hockey League (IHL), and as general manager and alternate governor of the Houston Rockets of the NBA.

Patterson was named Arizona State University's vice president for university athletics and athletics director on March 28, 2012. Prior to that, he was the chief operating officer for Arizona State University's athletics and managing director of their athletic teams.

On November 5, 2013, Patterson returned to his alma mater as the University of Texas's athletic director, replacing the retiring DeLoss Dodds. He was relieved from his duties as an athletic director on September 15, 2015.

On July 12, 2017, Patterson was appointed president and CEO of the Arizona Coyotes of the National Hockey League (NHL).

== Personal life ==
Patterson is son of Ray Patterson, who was the president of the Milwaukee Bucks from 1968 to 1972 and the general manager of the Houston Rockets of the NBA from 1972 to 1990.

Sporting positions
Preceded by Bob Whitsitt	President of the Portland Trail Blazers; 2003–2007	Succeeded by Tod Leiweke (interim)
Preceded by John Nash	General manager of the Portland Trail Blazers; 2006–2007	Succeeded by Tod Leiweke (interim)
