= Houston Rockets =

National Basketball Association team in Houston

- 2026–27 Houston Rockets season
- Conference: Western
- Division: Southwest
- Founded: 1967
- History: San Diego Rockets; 1967–1971; Houston Rockets; 1971–present
- Arena: Toyota Center
- Location: Houston, Texas
- Team colors: Rockets red, championship yellow, black, white
- Main sponsor: Memorial Hermann
- President: Gretchen Sheirr
- General manager: Rafael Stone
- Head coach: Ime Udoka
- Ownership: Tilman Fertitta
- Affiliation: Rio Grande Valley Vipers
- Championships: 2 (1994, 1995)
- Conference titles: 4 (1981, 1986, 1994, 1995)
- Division titles: 9 (1977, 1986, 1993, 1994, 2015, 2018, 2019, 2020, 2025)
- Retired numbers: 8 (11, 22, 23, 24, 34, 44, 45, CD)
- Website: nba.com/rockets
Association	Icon	Statement

The Houston Rockets are an American professional basketball team based in Houston. The Rockets compete in the National Basketball Association (NBA) as a member of the Southwest Division of the Western Conference. The team plays its home games at Toyota Center, located in Downtown Houston. Throughout its history, Houston has won two NBA championships and four Western Conference titles. It was established in 1967 as the San Diego Rockets, an expansion team originally based in San Diego. In 1971, the Rockets relocated to Houston.

The Rockets won only 15 games in their debut season as a franchise in 1967. In the 1968 NBA draft, the Rockets were awarded the first overall pick and selected power forward Elvin Hayes, who would lead the team to its first playoff appearance in his rookie season. The Rockets did not finish a season with a winning record for almost a decade until the 1976–77 season, when they traded for All-Star center Moses Malone from the American Basketball Association (ABA). Malone led Houston to the Eastern Conference finals in his first year with the team. During the 1980–81 season, the Rockets finished the regular season with a 40–42 record but still made the playoffs. Led by Malone, the Rockets reached their first NBA Finals in 1981, losing in six games to the Boston Celtics.

In the 1984 NBA draft, once again with the first overall pick, the Rockets drafted center Hakeem Olajuwon, who would become the cornerstone of the most successful period in franchise history. Paired with 7-foot-4-inch (2.24 m) Ralph Sampson, they formed one of the tallest front courts in the NBA. Nicknamed the "Twin Towers", they led the team to the 1986 NBA Finals where Houston was again defeated by the Boston Celtics. The Rockets continued to reach the playoffs throughout the 1980s, but failed to advance past the first round for several years following 1987. Rudy Tomjanovich took over as head coach midway through the 1991–92 season, ushering in the most successful period in franchise history. Led by Olajuwon, the Rockets dominated the 1993–94 season, setting a then-franchise record 58 wins and went to the 1994 NBA Finals and won the franchise's first championship against the New York Knicks. During the following season, reinforced by another All-Star, Clyde Drexler, the Rockets repeated as champions with a four-game sweep of the Orlando Magic.

The Rockets acquired all-star power forward Charles Barkley in 1996, but were unable to advance past the Western Conference finals. Each one of the aging trio of Olajuwon, Drexler, and Barkley had left the team by 2001. The Rockets of the early 2000s, led by superstars Tracy McGrady and Yao Ming, followed the trend of consistent regular season respectability followed by playoff underachievement as both players struggled with injuries. After Yao's early retirement in 2011, the Rockets entered a period of rebuilding, completely dismantling and retooling their roster.

The acquisition of franchise player James Harden in 2012 launched the Rockets back into perennial championship contention throughout the rest of the 2010s, with no losing seasons in Harden's nine-season tenure with the team. Harden led the team to two Western Conference finals appearances (both times losing to the Golden State Warriors). Prior to the 2020–21 season, head coach Mike D'Antoni and general manager Daryl Morey left the organization, prompting Harden to seek a trade. He was traded to the Brooklyn Nets (Note: January 16, 2021: Brooklyn Nets to Houston Rockets (four-team trade with Cleveland Cavaliers and Indiana Pacers): Houston acquired Victor Oladipo, Dante Exum, Rodions Kurucs, a 2022 first-round draft selection, a 2024 first-round draft selection, a 2026 first-round draft selection, rights to swap first-round draft selections in 2021, 2023, 2025, and 2027, and a 2022 first-round draft selection (from Milwaukee); Brooklyn acquired James Harden and a 2024 second-round draft selection; Cleveland acquired Jarrett Allen and Taurean Prince; Indiana acquired Caris LeVert and two future second-round draft selections) which started a rebuilding period.

Moses Malone, Hakeem Olajuwon, and James Harden have been named the NBA's MVPs while playing for the Rockets, for a total of four MVP awards. The Rockets, when piloted by Morey, were renowned for popularizing the use of advanced statistical analytics (similar to sabermetrics in baseball) in player acquisitions and style of play.

== History ==
=== 1967–1971: San Diego Rockets ===
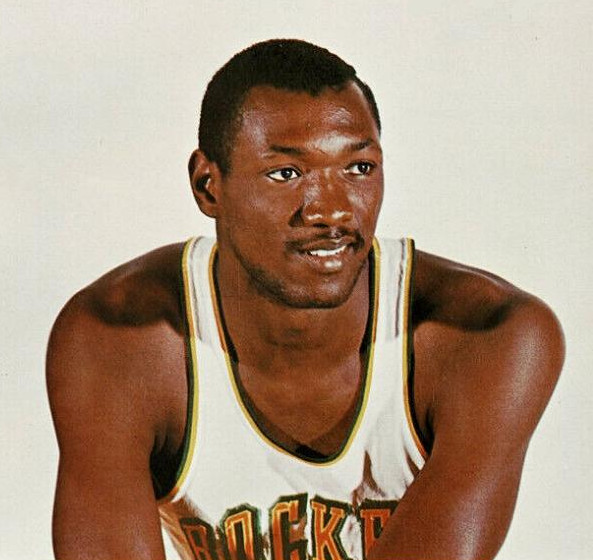
Elvin Hayes was selected first overall by the San Diego Rockets in the 1968 NBA draft.

The Rockets were founded in 1967 in San Diego by Robert Breitbard, who paid an entry fee of US$1.75 million to join the NBA as an expansion team for the 1967–68 season. The NBA wanted to add more teams in the Western United States and chose San Diego based on the city's strong economic and population growth, along with the local success of an ice hockey team owned by Breitbard, the San Diego Gulls of the Western Hockey League. The San Diego International Sports Center, which opened the previous year and was also owned by Breitbard, would serve as home to the new franchise. A local contest to name the franchise chose the name "Rockets", as it paid homage to San Diego's theme of "a city in motion" and the local arm of General Dynamics developing the Atlas missile and booster rocket program.

Breitbard brought in Jack McMahon, then-coach of the Cincinnati Royals, to serve as the Rockets' coach and general manager. The team, which would join the league along with the Seattle SuperSonics, then built its roster with both veteran players at an expansion draft, and college players from the 1967 NBA draft, where San Diego's first ever draft pick was Pat Riley. In their first two games of the season, the Rockets were up against the St. Louis Hawks, and lost both of those games. Their first win in franchise history came the very next game which occurred three days after against the SuperSonics. The Rockets won on the road, 121–114. Johnny Green recorded 30 points and 25 rebounds for the Rockets. The following game, the SuperSonics held a 15-point lead for most of the first half, before the Rockets mounted a comeback to force overtime. The SuperSonics eventually pulled away and won the game, 117–110, though Art Williams recorded the first ever triple-double in franchise history, as he recorded 17 points, 15 rebounds and 13 assists for the Rockets. The expansion Rockets ultimately lost 67 games in their inaugural season, which was an NBA record for losses in a season at the time.

In 1968, after the Rockets won a coin toss against the Baltimore Bullets to determine who would have the first overall pick in the 1968 NBA draft, they selected Elvin Hayes from the University of Houston. Hayes improved the Rockets' record to 37 wins and 45 losses, enough for the franchise's first ever playoff appearance in 1969, but the Rockets lost in the semifinals of the Western Division to the Atlanta Hawks, four games to two. The Rockets limped to a 27–55 finish in the 1969–70 season, before missing the playoffs by just one game in the 1970–71 season.

Off the court, Breitbard was facing serious financial losses due to a controversial ongoing tax-assessment issue that had plagued his San Diego Sports Arena since it was built. He was also still on the hook for paying off the NBA expansion fee for the Rockets, in addition to construction-related bonds on the arena, which he had built with private funding. To make matters worse, the American professional sports economy had begun to plummet in the late 1960s, and professional basketball was being hit particularly hard with nearly all franchises in the NBA and ABA operating at a financial loss at this time.

On January 26, 1970, during an emotional press conference on the floor of the Sports Arena, Breitbard addressed the San Diego fans regarding his dire finances and the state of his Rockets basketball and Gulls hockey teams. "...We have been served an eviction notice..." Breitbard announced. "I've tried to work quietly, to iron this out. But, at the moment it appears impossible. I don't want to sell. I'm not interested in selling outside of San Diego. It seems to me the Rockets and Gulls are part of this town. This arena, the Gulls, the Rockets, are a part of me, and our fans have been wonderful to us." Over the next nearly year and a half, numerous fans circulated petitions and lobbied local officials to help keep the Rockets and Gulls afloat and in San Diego. Several proposals surrounded providing financial aid or payment relief to Breitbard, or having the City and/or County of San Diego take ownership of the arena were discussed, but Breitbard was running out of time. At least 14 private offers for the Rockets were made to Breitbard, though all would have resulted in the team being relocated out of San Diego, which Breitbard was adamantly opposed to. The tax-assessment situation surrounding the Sports Arena (which was the only large arena in the region) ultimately made the prospect of another local owner purchasing the team infeasible.

On January 12, 1971, the Rockets hosted the 1971 NBA All-Star Game at the San Diego Sports Arena, a close contest in which the West beat the East 108–107 in front of a packed house of 14,378 fans.

On June 23, 1971, the San Diego Rockets were abruptly sold by Breitbard to a Houston–based investment group. The NBA hurriedly approved the sale, believing the franchise was on the verge of folding. News of the sale broke before the coaches, players, and team employees and executives could even be notified. Local officials in San Diego were also caught by surprise.

In their fourth and final season in existence, the San Diego Rockets missed the playoffs by just one game in the standings.

=== 1971–1976: Move to Houston and improvement with Murphy and Rudy-T ===
Texas Sports Investments bought the franchise for $5.6 million and moved the team to Houston before the start of the 1971–72 season. The franchise became the first NBA team in Texas, and the nickname "Rockets" took on even greater relevance after the move, given Houston's long connection to the space industry. Houston previously was awarded an NBA expansion franchise along with Buffalo, Cleveland and Portland on February 6, 1970, but the new entry folded six weeks later on March 20 when its investment group led by Alan Rothenberg failed to make the $750,000 down payment on the $3.7 million entrance fee required before the league's college player draft.

Before the start of the season, Hannum left for the Denver Rockets of the American Basketball Association – later renamed Denver Nuggets, who joined the NBA in 1976 – and Tex Winter was hired in his place. In the first six games of the 1971–72 season in Winter's first head coaching season, the Rockets all lost those games with an average of around 15 points per game. Their first win of the season came on October 26, 1971, with a 104–103 win over the home team, Detroit Pistons. Their second win of the season came five days later, a 102–87 win over the Buffalo Braves. After that game, the Rockets lost their next 8 games, against the Knicks, Trail Blazers, Bullets (twice), Warriors, Celtics, Bucks and Bulls. Their next win was on November 17 on the road against the 76ers. However, Winter's clashes with Hayes, due to a system that contrasted with the offensive style to which Hayes was accustomed, made Hayes ask for a trade, leaving for the Baltimore Bullets at the end of the 1971–72 season.

It was also around this time that the Rockets would unveil their classic yellow and red logo and accompanying uniforms used until the end of the 1994–95 season. Winter left soon after, being fired in January 1973 following a ten-game losing streak, and was replaced by Johnny Egan. Egan led the Rockets back to the playoffs in 1975, where the franchise also won their first round against the New York Knicks, subsequently losing to the veteran Boston Celtics in 5 games. At that time the Rockets gained popularity in Houston, selling out several home games during the regular season as the Rockets battled for a playoff spot and then selling out all of their home playoff games.

=== 1976–1982: The Moses Malone era ===
In the 1975–76 season the Rockets finally had a permanent home in Houston as they moved into The Summit, which they would call home for the next 29 years. During the period, the franchise was owned by Kenneth Schnitzer, developer of the Greenway Plaza which included The Summit. After missing the 1976 playoffs, Tom Nissalke was hired as a coach, and pressed the team to add a play-making guard in college standout John Lucas and a rebounding center through Moses Malone, who he had coached in the ABA. The additions had an immediate impact, with the 1976–77 Rockets winning the Central Division and going all the way to the Eastern Conference finals, losing to the Julius Erving's Philadelphia 76ers 4 games to 2. The following season had the team regressing to just 28 wins due to an injury to captain Tomjanovich, who got numerous facial fractures after being punched by Kermit Washington of the Los Angeles Lakers and wound up spending five months in rehabilitation. After trading Lucas to the Golden State Warriors in exchange for Rick Barry, the Rockets returned to the playoffs in 1978–79, with "The Chairman Of The Boards" Moses Malone receiving the 1979 MVP Award, but the team was swept 2–0 by Atlanta in the first round. Nissalke was let go, and assistant Del Harris was promoted to head coach.

In 1979, George Maloof, a businessperson from Albuquerque, New Mexico, bought the Rockets for $9 million. He died the following year, and while the Maloof family expressed interest in selling the team, George's 24-year-old son Gavin took over the Rockets. A buyer was eventually found in 1982 as businessman Charlie Thomas and Sidney Shlenker purchased the franchise for $11 million; the Maloofs would later own the Sacramento Kings from 1998 to 2013. The Maloof period of ownership marked the first dominant period of the Rockets, highlighted by the team's first Western Conference Championship and NBA Finals appearance in 1981, their first year after being moved from the Eastern Conference. Prior to the 1980–81 season, the arrival of the Dallas Mavericks led to an NBA realignment that sent the Rockets back to the Western Conference. Houston qualified for the playoffs only in the final game of the season with a 40–42 record. The postseason had the Rockets beat the Lakers, in-state rivals San Antonio Spurs, and the equally underdog Kansas City Kings to become only the second team in NBA history (after the 1959 Minneapolis Lakers) to have advanced to the Finals after achieving a losing record in the regular season. In the NBA Finals facing Larry Bird's Boston Celtics, the Rockets blew a late lead in game 1 and won game 2 at the Boston Garden. However, afterwards the team failed to capitalize on the early success against the favored Celtics, and eventually lost in six games.

While new owner Charlie Thomas expressed interest in renewing with Moses Malone, who had been again chosen as MVP in 1981–82, the Rockets traded him to the Philadelphia 76ers for Caldwell Jones, as a declining regional economy made the Rockets unable to pay Malone's salary. When the Rockets finished a league worst 14–68, Celtics coach Bill Fitch was hired to replace outgoing Del Harris, and the team won the first pick of the 1983 NBA draft, used to select Ralph Sampson from the University of Virginia. Sampson had good numbers and was awarded the NBA Rookie of the Year award, but the Rockets still finished last overall, again getting the top pick at the upcoming 1984 NBA draft, used to select Hakeem Olajuwon from the University of Houston.

=== 1984–2001: The Hakeem Olajuwon era ===
==== 1984–1987: The "Twin Towers" ====
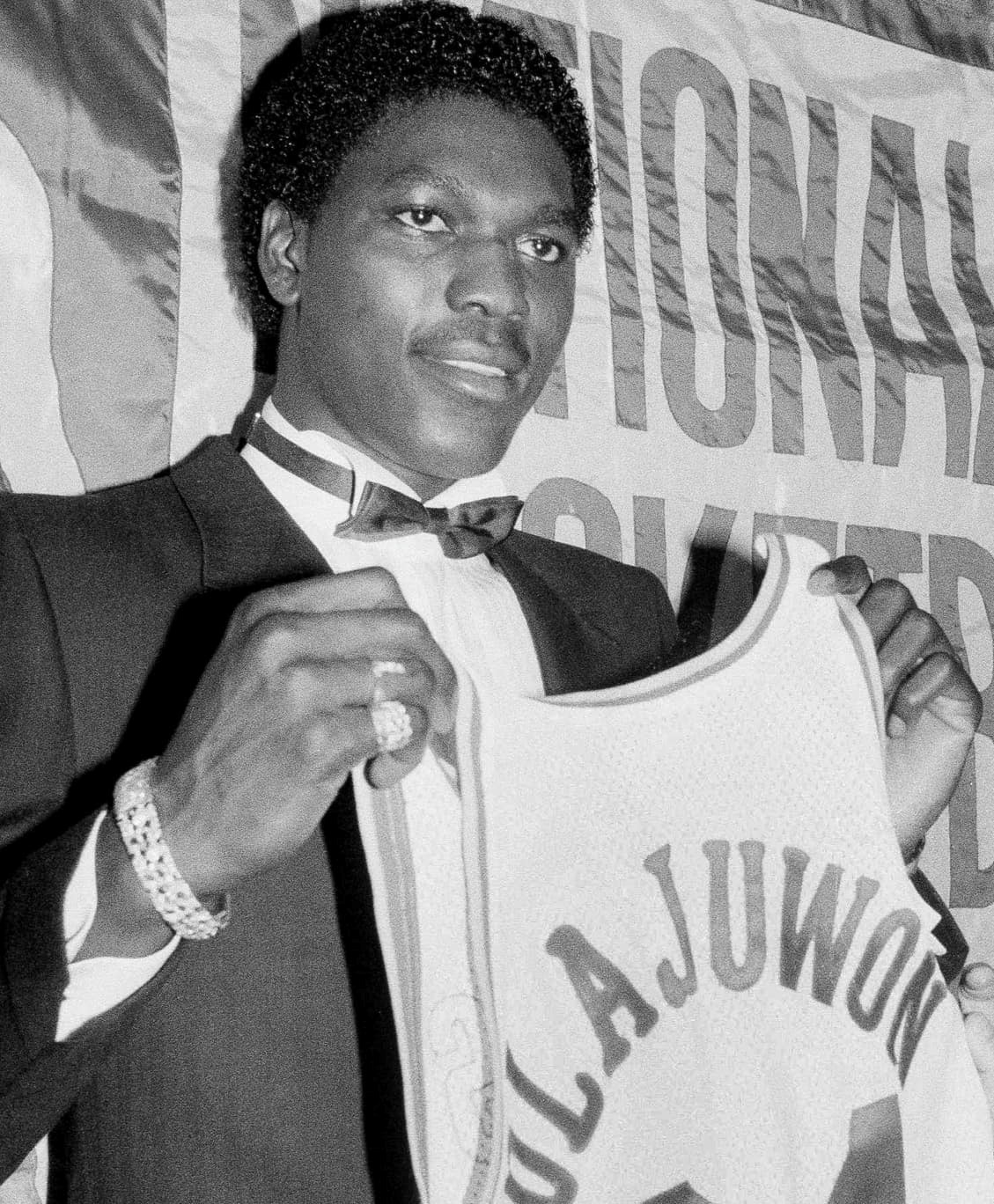
Hakeem Olajuwon won Finals MVP in 1994 and 1995 for leading the team to back-to-back championships.

In his first season, Olajuwon finished second to Michael Jordan in NBA Rookie of the Year balloting, and the Rockets record improved by 19 games, good enough for a return to the playoffs as the third best team in the West, where they were upset by the sixth-seeded Utah Jazz. The duo of Olajuwon and Sampson earned much praise, and was nicknamed "Twin Towers". In the following season, Houston won the Midwest Division title with a 51–31 record. The subsequent playoffs had the Rockets sweeping the Sacramento Kings, having a hard-fought six-game series with Alex English's Denver Nuggets, and then facing defending champion Lakers, losing the first game but eventually managing to win the series – the only Western Playoffs defeat of the Showtime Lakers – to get to the franchise's second Finals appearance. The NBA Finals once again matched the Rockets up against the Celtics, a contrast to Houston's young front challenging the playoff-hardened Celtics front court of Larry Bird, Kevin McHale and Robert Parish. The Celtics won the first two games in Boston, gave the Rockets their only home playoff defeat that season in game 4, and clinched the title as Bird scored a triple-double on game 6.

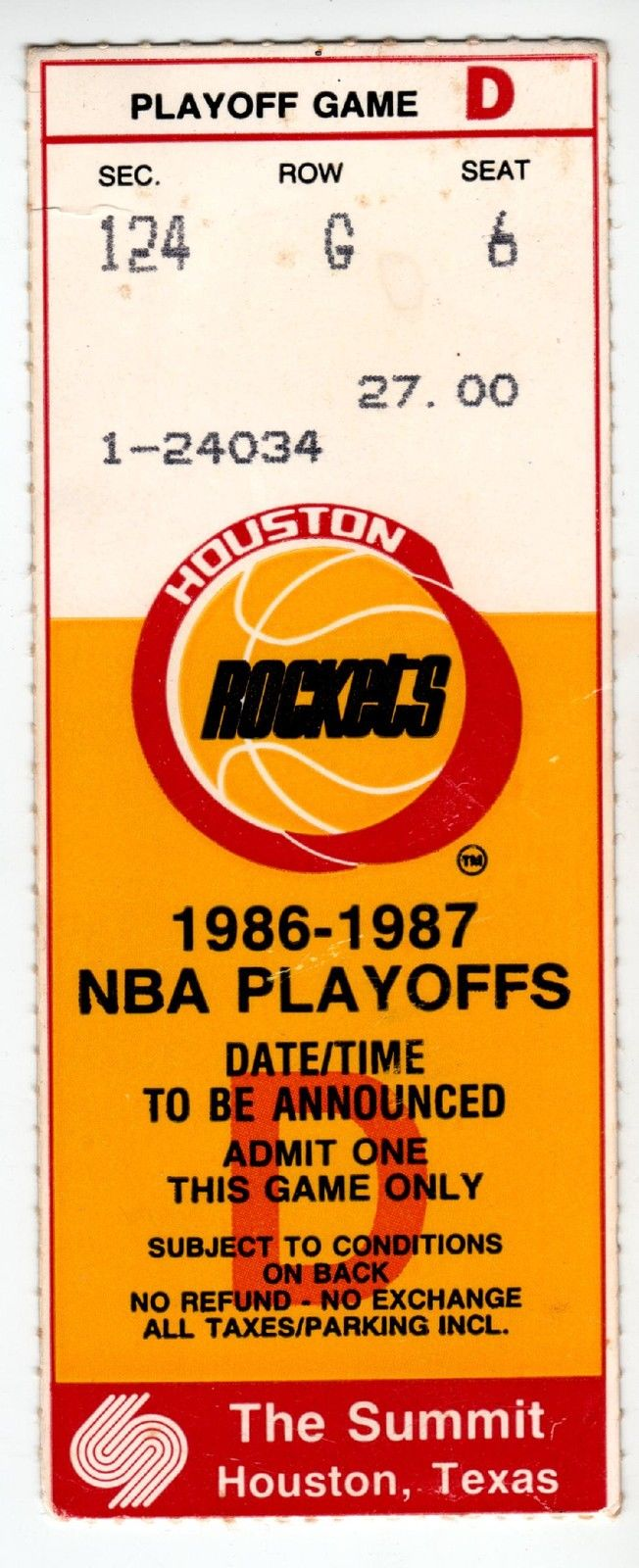
A ticket for game 2 of the 1987 Western Conference semifinals between the Rockets and the Seattle SuperSonics

After the Finals, Boston coach K. C. Jones called the Rockets "the new monsters on the block" feeling they had a bright future. But the team had a poor start to the following season, followed by nearly a decade of underachievement and failure, amidst players getting injured or suspended for cocaine usage, and during the playoffs were defeated in the second round by the Seattle SuperSonics in six games, with the final game being a double-overtime classic that saw Olajuwon notching 49 points, 25 rebounds and 6 blocks in defeat. Early in the 1987–88 season, Sampson, who had signed a new contract, was traded to the Golden State Warriors, bringing the Twin Towers era to an end just 18 months after their Finals appearance. Sampson's once-promising career was shortened due to chronic knee injuries, which forced his retirement in 1991. Jones' prophecy of a Rockets dynasty never materialized until the early 1990s.

==== 1987–1992: Lean years ====
In the next five seasons, the Rockets either failed to qualify for the playoffs or were eliminated in the first round. The first elimination in 1988 led to Fitch's dismissal, with Don Chaney replacing him as head coach. Chaney, like Olajuwon, also played for the Houston Cougars under Guy Lewis, having played along Elvin Hayes in the late 1960s. Chaney had his best season during 1990–91, where he was named the Coach of the Year after leading the Rockets to a 52–30 record despite Olajuwon's absence due to injury for 25 games. Despite Olajuwon's usual strong numbers, the underwhelming roster could not be lifted out of mediocrity. However, the attempts to rebuild the team nucleus incorporated players that would later make an impact in the years to come, such as Kenny Smith, Vernon Maxwell, Robert Horry, Mario Elie, Sam Cassell and Otis Thorpe.

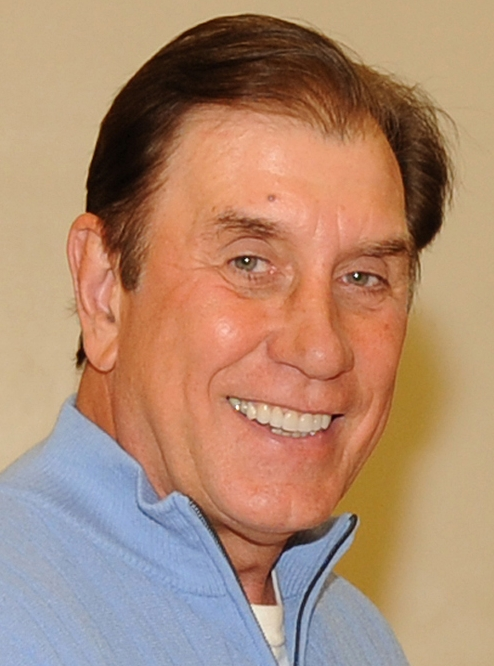
Rudy Tomjanovich spent all his playing career with the Rockets, and after becoming the team's head coach in 1992 led Houston to two straight championships.

Midway through the 1991–92 season, with the Rockets' record only 26–26, Chaney was fired and replaced by his assistant Rudy Tomjanovich, a former Houston player himself. While the Rockets did not make the playoffs, Tomjanovich's arrival was considered a step forward. In the next year, the Rockets improved their record by 13 games, getting the Midwest Division title, and winning their first playoff series in 6 years by defeating the Los Angeles Clippers, before an elimination by the SuperSonics in a closely contested game 7 overtime loss.

==== 1993–1995: Back-to-back championships for Clutch City ====
On July 30, 1993, Leslie Alexander purchased the Rockets for $85 million. The next season, in Tomjanovich's second full year as head coach, the Rockets began the 1993–94 season by tying an NBA record with a start of 15–0. Their first loss of the season came on December 3, 1993, as the Hawks, led by Dominique Wilkins' 27 points, defeated the Rockets, 133–111. The next game, the Rockets stormed a comeback against the Cleveland Cavaliers as they won by a single point, 99–98, on the road. The Rockets now had won their first 16 out of 17 games of the season, tying the 1948–49 Capitols for the best 17-game start in a season, at that time. On December 9, Olajuwon recorded 28 points, 16 rebounds and 4 blocks as the Rockets cruised past the visiting Heat in overtime to win their 18th game of the season. Led by Olajuwon, who was named the MVP and Defensive Player of the Year, the Rockets won 58 games, a franchise record at the time. After quickly dispatching the Portland Trail Blazers (who had made the finals just two years prior) in 4 games, they then faced the defending Western Conference champion Phoenix Suns, led by the previous year's MVP Charles Barkley. The series opened up in Houston, which saw the Rockets open up a big lead going into the fourth quarter. In both games, however, the Rockets inexplicably collapsed to allow the Suns a 2–0 lead going back to Phoenix. Following recent heart-breaking playoff losses by the Houston Oilers, it appeared as though the Rockets were doomed. Local newspapers labeled Houston as "Choke City", which the Rockets took to heart and ultimately came back to win the series in seven games. As "Choke City" became "Clutch City", the name permanently became a part of Houston folklore. The Rockets then soon defeated John Stockton and Karl Malone's Utah Jazz in five in the conference finals to advance to their third NBA Finals. The New York Knicks opened a 3–2 advantage, but the Rockets won the last two games on their home court and claimed their first championship in franchise history. Olajuwon was awarded the Finals MVP, after averaging 27 points, nine rebounds and four blocked shots a game.

The Rockets initially struggled in the first half of the 1994–95 season, which they fixed by sending Otis Thorpe to the Portland Trail Blazers in exchange for Olajuwon's former college teammate Clyde Drexler. With only 47 wins, the Rockets entered the playoffs as the sixth seed in the Western Conference. Still, a strong playoff run that earned Houston the nickname "Clutch City" had the Rockets defeating the West's top three seeds – the Jazz, Suns and Spurs – to reach back-to-back finals, this time against the Orlando Magic, led by Shaquille O'Neal and Penny Hardaway. When Houston swept the Finals' series in four games, they became the first team in NBA history to win the championship as a sixth seed, and the first to beat four 50-win teams in a single postseason en route to the championship. Olajuwon was again the Finals MVP, only the second player after Michael Jordan to win the award two years in a row. It was on the floor of The Summit after they captured their second title that head coach Rudy Tomjanovich proclaimed, "Don't ever underestimate the heart of a champion!"

==== 1995–2002: Post-championship and rebuilding ====
During the off-season, the Rockets went for a change of visual identity, making navy blue and silver the new primary colors while adopting a new cartoon-inspired logo and pinstriped jerseys. They started the season by winning the annual McDonald's Championship in October, with Drexler being named the tournament's MVP. In the NBA, the Rockets won 48 games in the 1995–96 season, in which Olajuwon became the NBA's all-time leader in blocked shots. The playoffs had the Rockets beating the Lakers before a sweep by the SuperSonics.

Before the start of the succeeding season, the Rockets sent four players to Phoenix in exchange for Charles Barkley. The resulting "Big Three" of Olajuwon, Drexler, and Barkley had a strong debut season with a 57–25 record, going all the way to the Western Conference finals before losing to the Utah Jazz 4–2 on a dramatic last-second shot by John Stockton. The following season was marked by injuries, and Houston finished 41–41 and the eighth seed, leading to another elimination by the top-seeded Jazz.

Drexler retired after the season, and the Rockets traded to bring in Scottie Pippen to take his place. In the lockout-shortened 1998–99 season, the Rockets lost to the Lakers in the first round of the playoffs. After the 1999 draft, the Rockets traded for the second overall pick Steve Francis from the Vancouver Grizzlies, in exchange for four players and a first-round draft pick. However, after Houston traded a discontented Pippen to Portland, and Barkley suffered a career-ending injury, the rebuilt Rockets went 34–48 and missed the playoffs, for only the second time in 15 years. Francis was named Co-Rookie of the Year.

In the 2000–01 season, the Rockets worked their way to a 45–37 record. However, in a competitive Western Conference where seven teams won 50 games, this left the Rockets two games out of the playoffs. In the following off-season, a 38-year-old Olajuwon requested a trade, and, despite stating their desire to keep him, the Rockets reached a sign-and-trade agreement, sending him to the Toronto Raptors. The ensuing 2001–02 season—the first without Hakeem in two decades—was unremarkable, and the Rockets finished with only 28 wins led by first time All-Star Francis.

=== 2002–2009: The "Ming Dynasty" ===
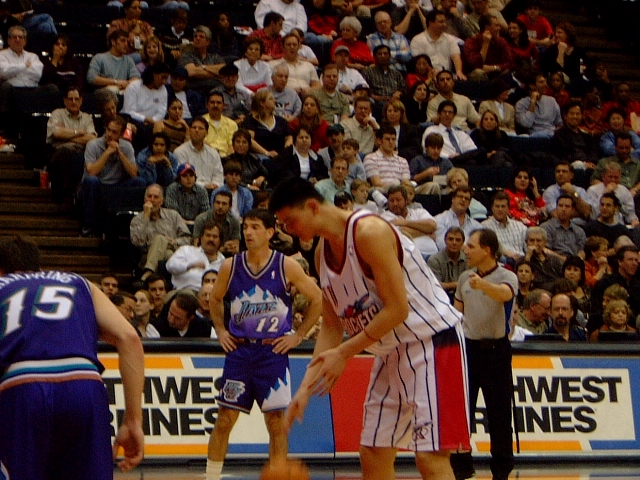
Yao Ming during his rookie season with the Rockets

==== 2002–2004: Early years with Yao and Francis ====
After Houston was awarded the first overall pick in the 2002 NBA draft, they selected Yao Ming, a 7 feet 6 inches (2.29 m) Chinese center. The Rockets missed the 2003 playoffs by one game, improving their record by 15 victories led by All-Star starters Steve Francis and Rookie Yao Ming.

The 2003–04 season marked the Rockets' arrival to a new arena, Toyota Center, a redesign of their uniforms and logo, and their first season without Rudy Tomjanovich, who resigned as head coach after being diagnosed with bladder cancer. Led by former Knicks coach Jeff Van Gundy, the Rockets finished the regular season with a record of 45–37, earning their first playoff berth since 1999, again losing to the Lakers in the first round.

==== 2004–2009: The Yao–McGrady duo ====
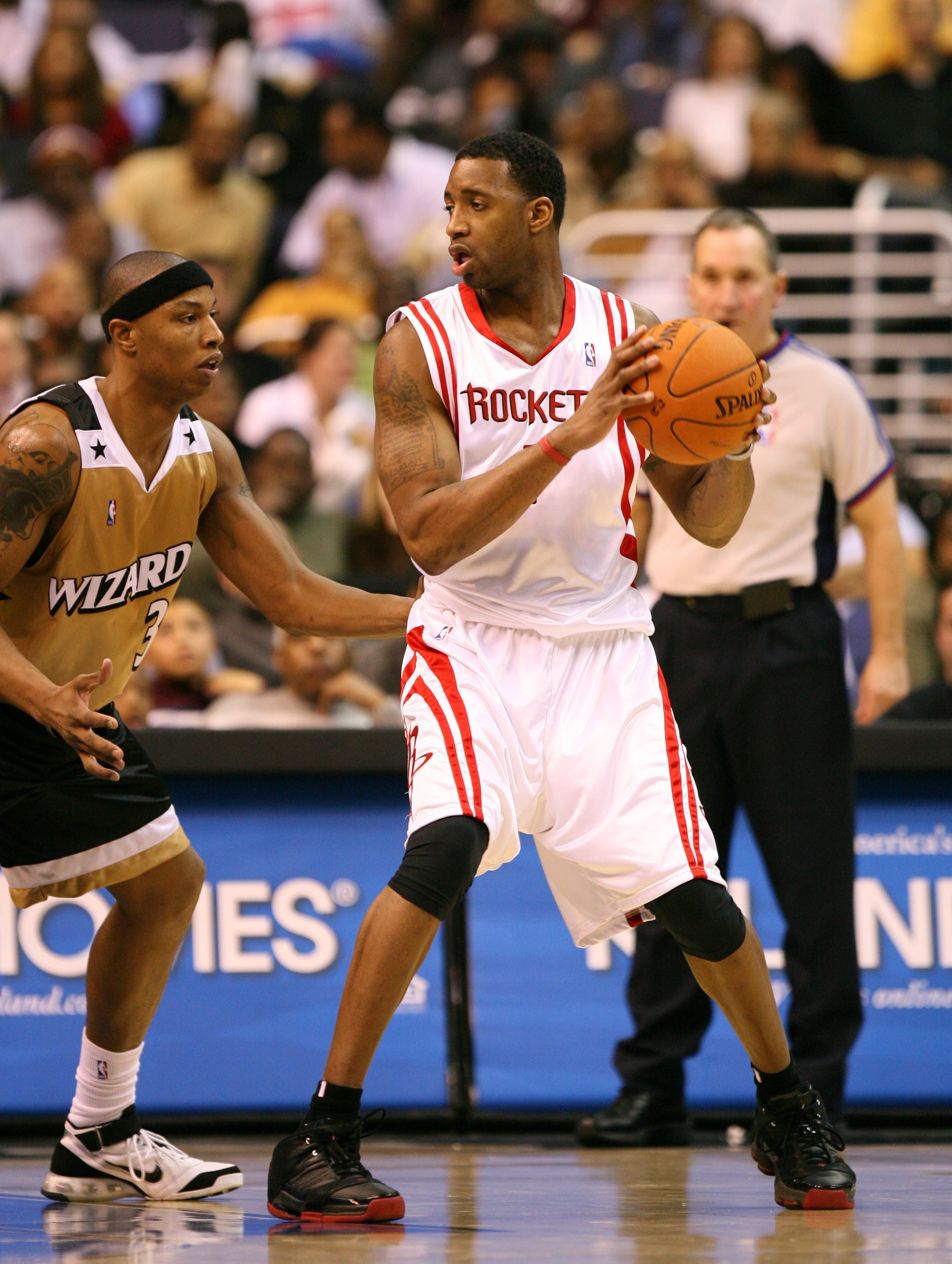
Houston acquired Tracy McGrady in 2004.

In the off-season, Houston saw major changes in the roster as the Rockets acquired Tracy McGrady in a seven-player deal with the Orlando Magic Including three time Rockets All-Star Steve Francis. McGrady and Yao Ming formed a well-regarded pair that helped the Rockets win 22 consecutive games in the 2007–08 season, which was at the time the third longest winning streak in NBA history. Still, the duo was plagued with injuries – of the 463 regular season games for which they were teammates, Yao missed 146 and McGrady 160 – and did not win any playoff series, despite gathering leads over the Dallas Mavericks in 2005 and the Jazz in 2007. Despite this, Yao was selected to carry his home country's Five-star Red Flag at the Summer Olympics opening ceremony held at home in 2008. After the 2007 elimination, Van Gundy was fired, and the Rockets hired Rick Adelman to replace him.

For the 2008–09 season, the Rockets signed forward Ron Artest. While McGrady wound up playing only half the games before enduring a season-ending microfracture surgery, the Rockets ended the season 53–29, enough for the Western Conference's fifth seed. During the playoffs, the Rockets beat the Portland Trail Blazers four games to two, winning their first playoff round since 1997. During the series, Dikembe Mutombo injured his knee, which forced him to retire after 18 seasons in the NBA. However, the second round against the Lakers had the Rockets losing 4–3 and Yao suffering yet another season-ending injury, this time a hairline fracture in his left foot.

=== 2009–2012: Competitive rebuilding ===
During the 2009–10 season, the Rockets saw the departures of Artest in the off-season and McGrady, Joey Dorsey and Carl Landry during mid-season trades. Despite great play by Kevin Martin, who arrived from the Kings, and Aaron Brooks, who would eventually be chosen as the Most Improved Player of the season, the Rockets could not make it to the playoffs, finishing 42–40, third in the Southwest Division. At that time, the Rockets set an NBA record for best record by a team with no All-Stars. The Rockets would also finish ninth in the Western Conference for the following two seasons, with Yao Ming getting a season-ending injury seven games into the 2010–11 season and deciding to retire during the 2011 off-season. Said off-season, which saw the NBA going through a lockout, had Adelman dismissed, and general manager Daryl Morey deciding to start a revamp of the Rockets based on advanced statistical analytics (similar to sabermetrics in baseball) in player acquisitions and style of play. Kevin McHale was named head coach, and the roster saw significant changes.

=== 2012–2021: The James Harden era ===
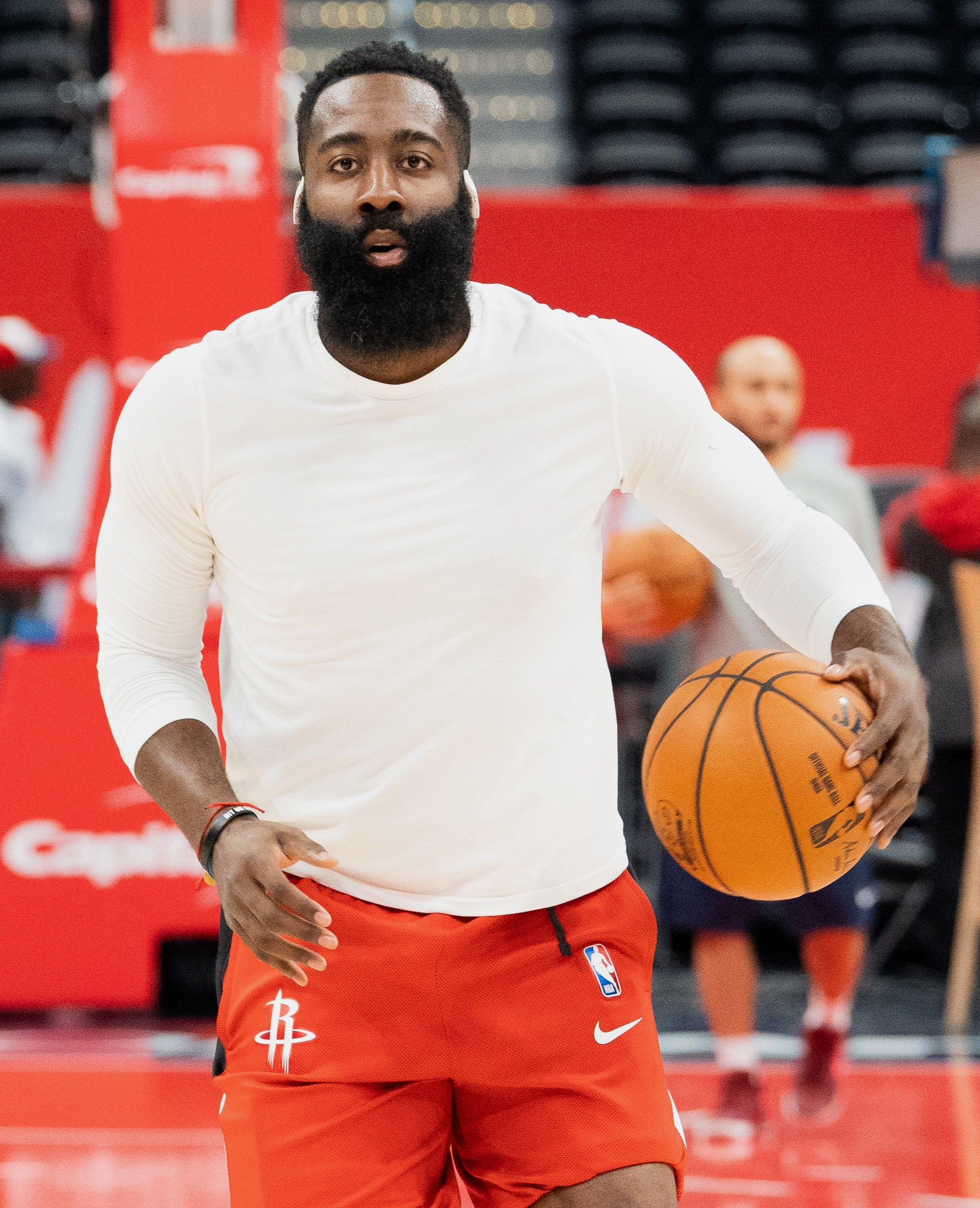
James Harden arrived in Houston in 2012 and became a franchise player for the Rockets.

After the roster moves made by Morey during the 2012 NBA off-season, only four players were left from the 2011–12 Rockets roster: Chandler Parsons, Greg Smith, Marcus Morris, and Patrick Patterson, with the latter two leaving through trades during the 2012–13 season. The most important acquisition was reigning Sixth Man of the Year James Harden, who Morey called a "foundational" player expected to be Houston's featured player after a supporting role in the Oklahoma City Thunder. Harden caused an immediate impact as part of the starting lineup for the Rockets, with 37 points, 12 assists, 6 rebounds, 4 steals, and a block in the season opener against the Detroit Pistons, and an average of 25.9 points a game through the season. Combining Harden's performance and McHale's up-tempo offense, the Rockets became one of the highest-scoring offenses in the NBA, leading the league in scoring for the majority of the season. In the postseason, the Rockets fell to the Oklahoma City Thunder in the first round, losing the series 4–2.

Eager to add another franchise player to their team, the Rockets heavily pursued and then acquired free agent center Dwight Howard in the 2013 off-season. He officially signed with the Rockets on July 13, 2013. Led by the new inside-out combination of Howard and James Harden, and with a strong supporting cast including Chandler Parsons, Jeremy Lin, and Ömer Aşık, the Rockets were expected to jump into title contention in the upcoming season. However, that postseason, the Rockets were defeated in the first round by the Portland Trail Blazers, losing the series 4–2. Still, in the 2014–15 season, without Lin and Parsons but reinforced by Trevor Ariza, the Rockets started the season well, winning the first four games of the season for the first time since 1996–97, and winning each of their first six games by 10 points or more, the first team to accomplish this feat since the 1985–86 Denver Nuggets. Though the Rockets had many key players miss time throughout the entire season, James Harden took it upon himself to keep the Rockets near the top of the conference, turning him into an MVP front-runner. He became the first Rocket to score 50 points in a game since Hakeem Olajuwon, as well as the only player in franchise history to record multiple 50 point games in a season. On April 15, 2015, the Rockets beat the Jazz to claim their first-ever Southwest Division title and first Division crown since 1994, and by completing 56 wins finished with the third-best regular season record in franchise history. During the playoffs, the Rockets beat the Mavericks 4–1 in the first round, and overcame a 3–1 deficit against the Los Angeles Clippers to win the Western semifinals and return to the conference finals for the first time in 18 years. In the conference finals, the Rockets were defeated by the Golden State Warriors 4–1.

The 2015–16 season saw Kevin McHale fired after a bad start where the team only won 4 of its first 11 games, and assistant J. B. Bickerstaff took over coaching duties. Inconsistent play led to the Rockets struggling to remain in the playoff qualifying zone, and surrounded by trade rumors. Houston only clinched its 2016 playoffs spot by winning its last game, finishing the season 41–41 to earn an eight seed and a match-up against the Warriors. Like in the previous year, the Rockets were once again defeated by Golden State in five games.

==== 2016–2020: The arrival of Mike D'Antoni ====
During the 2016 off-season, Mike D'Antoni was named as the Rockets' new head coach, and Dwight Howard opted out of his contract's final year, becoming a free agent. In the following free-agency period, the Rockets looked to embrace the play styles of both coach D'Antoni and Harden through the signings of Ryan Anderson and Eric Gordon, two predominately perimeter players and good fits in Houston's up-tempo offense style. Morey signed Nenê Hilario to succor the roster defense and a backup behind Clint Capela and Ryan Anderson after Dwight Howard and Donatas Motiejūnas left the team during free agency.

When the 2016–17 season started, Harden was off to a great start and was widely considered a top MVP runner along with Kawhi Leonard, alongside former teammate Russell Westbrook. To gain more firepower from the bench, Morey traded Corey Brewer and the 2017 first-round pick to the Los Angeles Lakers for Lou Williams to enhance the team's offense. When the season ended, the Rockets were third in both the Western Conference and overall rankings, a major improvement from the season before. D'Antoni was named the NBA Coach of the Year, Eric Gordon the Sixth Man of the Year, and Harden finished second in MVP voting to Russell Westbrook. In the playoffs, the Rockets faced the sixth seeded Oklahoma City Thunder in a battle of the MVP frontrunners, as the winner was not announced until after the finals. The Rockets won the series 4–1 including Nene Hilario's perfect 12–12 in field goals in game 4. In the following round, Houston opened with a dominating 27 points win over the San Antonio Spurs, lost the following two games and then tied the series again. The fifth game went into overtime and had both Manu Ginobili blocking James Harden's game tying three point attempt at the final second, and Nene injuring himself out of the postseason. Without Nene, the Rockets could not guard LaMarcus Aldridge, who scored 34 points and grabbed 12 rebounds in the series-closing match.

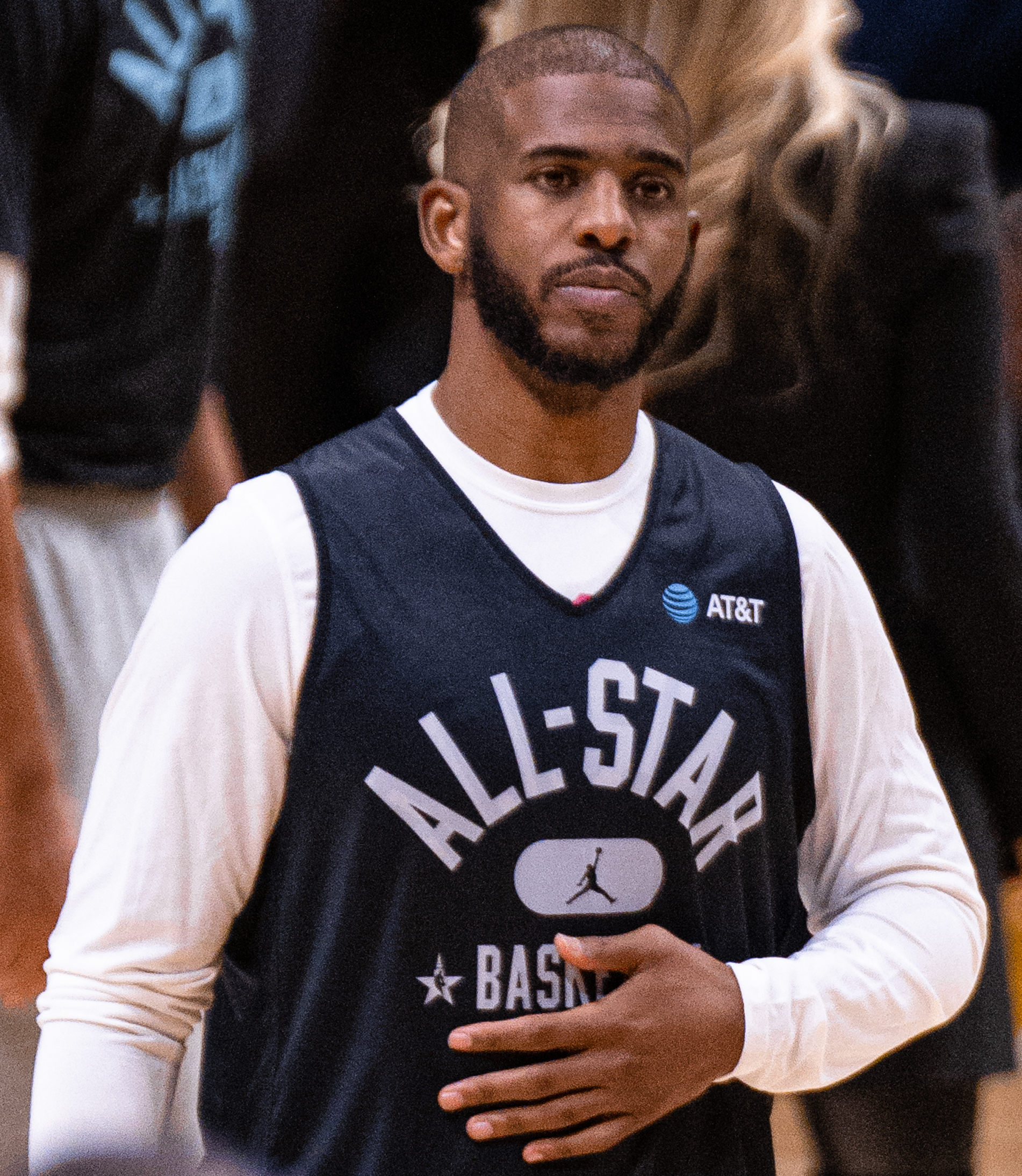
Chris Paul (shown in 2022) arrived in Houston in 2017.

During the 2017 off-season, the Rockets were purchased by Houston restaurant billionaire Tilman Fertitta for $2.2 billion, breaking the record for the price to purchase an American professional sports team. The team also acquired 8-time All-NBA player and 9-time All-Star Chris Paul in a trade from the Los Angeles Clippers, in exchange for seven players, cash considerations, and a top three protected 2018 first round draft pick. Even if Paul missed many games due to a knee injury, he was a key addition to the Rockets. The team finished the season with 65 wins, a record both league-leading and the best in franchise history. During the playoffs, Houston beat the Minnesota Timberwolves and Utah Jazz in five games before another confrontation with the Golden State Warriors. In game 5 of the conference finals, the Rockets took a 3–2 lead in the series, but they saw Paul leave with an injured hamstring. His absence was felt in the two remaining games, where Houston led by halftime in game 7 only to suffer a comeback by Golden State.

The Rockets had one draft pick entering the off-season, and they used it to select De'Anthony Melton, packaging him in a trade with the Phoenix Suns alongside Ryan Anderson to receive Brandon Knight and Marquese Chriss. In free agency, they signed James Ennis III, Michael Carter-Williams, and Carmelo Anthony. They started the season with a 1–4 record, and after 13 games where they went 6–7, Houston and Anthony mutually agreed to part ways, who was eventually traded to the Chicago Bulls and subsequently waived. After falling to the 14th seed in the Western Conference, James Harden went on a 32-game streak scoring at least 30 points per game—the second-longest in NBA history—with Harden averaging 41.1 points per game in that run. He drove the Rockets through a 21–11 push in that streak; and after beginning the season 11–14, the Rockets finished the season 42–15, winning 20 of their last 25 games and finishing fourth in the Western Conference after losing the final two games of the season, which would have potentially given them the second or third seed. After what was determined to be poor fits of the acquisitions made in free agency, on top of injuries, Daryl Morey traded the players acquired in the off-season at the trade deadline and replaced them with Austin Rivers, Kenneth Faried, Danuel House, and Iman Shumpert during the season. On April 7, 2019, against the Phoenix Suns, Houston became the first team in NBA history to make 25+ two-pointers and 25+ three-pointers in the same game, outscoring their last four opponents by 117 points, second-best in a four-game span in franchise history (127+ in February 1993). They beat their own record for most three-pointers made by one team in a single game in NBA history two times with 26 and 27. The Rockets clinched a division title and a playoff berth for a seventh straight appearance. After defeating the Utah Jazz in five games, Houston faced Golden State for the fourth time in five years. The series began with a tight game 1 decided by four points along with officiating that received scrutiny. With both teams winning their home games, putting the series at 2–2, Golden State won the next two games to eliminate the Rockets for the second year in a row along with the fourth time in five years.

During the 2019 off-season, Morey sought out to once again retool the roster. As part of a trade with the Oklahoma City Thunder, the Rockets traded Chris Paul, two future first round picks, and two future first round pick swaps in exchange for James Harden's former Thunder teammate Russell Westbrook. Nearing the trade deadline of the 2019–20 season, the Rockets were involved in a blockbuster, four-team trade which was centered around bringing Robert Covington back to the Rockets and sending centers Clint Capela and Nenê to the Atlanta Hawks. The trade cemented the Rockets' total commitment to a small ball, 5-out offense, a style of play which was considered revolutionary for its time. In their first twelve games since going 6'7" or shorter in their lineups, the Rockets went 10–2, being in the top percentile in win percentage, offensive rating, and point differential. In February, the month they made the trade, the double-MVP backcourt of Harden and Westbrook became the first teammates in NBA history to average 30+ points and 5+ assists per game. By the end of the season, Harden and Westbrook scored a combined 61.5 points per game, breaking Kobe Bryant and Shaquille O'Neal's previous record for the highest-scoring basketball duo since the ABA-NBA merger.

Following the suspension of the 2019–20 NBA season, the Rockets were one of the 22 teams invited to the NBA Bubble to participate in the final eight games of the regular season.

After the Rockets were eliminated in the playoffs by the Los Angeles Lakers, D'Antoni and Morey informed the Rockets that they would both not return to the team for the 2020–21 season. Rafael Stone was hired as the general manager after serving in general counsel and as an assistant general manager. Stephen Silas was hired as the Rockets' head coach. Stone traded Robert Covington to the Portland Trail Blazers in exchange for former Houston veteran Trevor Ariza, a first-round pick, and the rights to Isaiah Stewart, who was the 16th overall pick in the 2020 NBA draft. Stone then traded Ariza, the rights to Stewart, a second round pick, and cash considerations to the Detroit Pistons in exchange for Christian Wood, a first-round pick, and a second round pick. A few days later, the Rockets signed former All-Star DeMarcus Cousins in a one-year deal. A week later, Westbrook was traded to the Washington Wizards in December 2020 in an exchange for Cousins former Kentucky teammate John Wall and a lottery-protected first-round pick.

In January 2021, Harden was traded to the Brooklyn Nets in a four-team trade. In return, the Rockets received Victor Oladipo from the Indiana Pacers, Rodions Kurucs from the Brooklyn Nets, Dante Exum from the Cleveland Cavaliers, four first-round picks, and four first-round picks swap. (Note: January 16, 2021: Brooklyn Nets to Houston Rockets (four-team trade with Cleveland Cavaliers and Indiana Pacers): Houston acquired Victor Oladipo, Dante Exum, Rodions Kurucs, a 2022 first-round draft selection, 2024 first-round draft selection, 2026 first-round draft selection, rights to swap first-round draft selections in 2021, 2023, 2025, and 2027, and a 2022 first-round draft selection (from Milwaukee); Brooklyn acquired James Harden and a 2024 second-round draft selection; Cleveland acquired Jarrett Allen and Taurean Prince; Indiana acquired Caris LeVert and 2 future second-round draft selections) The Rockets began the season with an 11–10 start but ended up with a 17–55 record, (Note: Due to COVID-19, the league shortened the season to 72 games rather than its usual 82-game season.) the worst in the league despite with many injuries and trades.

=== 2021–present: Şengün era ===
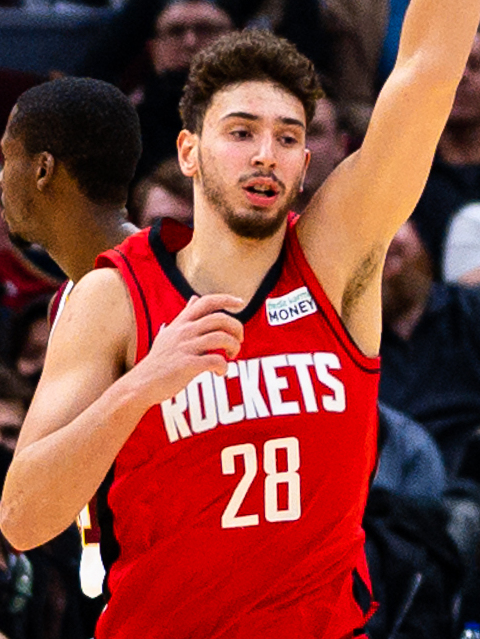
Alperen Şengün was drafted 16th overall in 2021 by the Oklahoma City Thunder and was traded to the Rockets on draft night.

In the 2021 NBA draft, the team selected Jalen Green with the second overall pick out of the NBA G League Ignite, pairing him alongside Kevin Porter Jr., who was acquired via trade the season prior for a top-55 protected second-round pick. Because of their additions in the draft, including first round selections of Alperen Şengün and Josh Christopher, the team began focusing on developing and rebuilding around their young core, which resulted in John Wall being benched for the entire season. In the 2021–22 season, the Rockets were once again at the bottom of the league, with a 20–62 record. Jalen Green was selected to the NBA All-Rookie First Team with averages of 17.3 points, 3.4 rebounds, and 2.6 assists.

In the 2022 NBA draft, the Rockets selected Jabari Smith Jr. with third overall pick and Tari Eason with the 17th overall picks. The Rockets made some adjustments by sending forward Christian Wood to the Dallas Mavericks in an exchange for Boban Marjanović, Sterling Brown, Trey Burke and Marquese Chriss and traded all of them to the Oklahoma City Thunder during the off-season to develop their young core while keeping Marjanović. The Rockets bought out John Wall's contract, who had been demanding a trade for a while and did not participate in the Rockets' 2021–22 season.

On February 9, 2023, the Rockets traded long-time veteran Eric Gordon to the Clippers in a three-team trade in exchange of Danny Green and John Wall and were later waived. The Rockets ended the 2022–23 regular season with a 22–60 record, tying with the San Antonio Spurs for last in the Western Conference. The Rockets fired head coach Stephen Silas after they chose not to pick up his fourth year option and replaced him with former Boston Celtics head coach Ime Udoka.

One-time All-Star Fred VanVleet joined the Rockets via free agency signing a three-year, $130 million contract. The next day, former Memphis Grizzlies forward Dillon Brooks joined the team signing a four-year, $86 million contract after a first-round exit against the Los Angeles Lakers. The Rockets selected Amen Thompson with the fourth pick and Cam Whitmore with the 20th pick in the 2023 NBA draft. Şengün improved this season, averaging 21.1 points per game, 9.3 rebounds per game, and 5 assists per game. He was announced out for the season on March 21 with an ankle injury.

The Houston Rockets selected Kentucky guard Reed Sheppard with the third overall pick in the 2024 NBA draft. Building on momentum from last year, they had a breakout season, finishing 52–30 and securing the second seed in the Western Conference. The team specifically leaned on Şengün, who made his first All-Star Game appearance, and a breakout campaign from Amen Thompson. The Rockets made their first playoff appearance in five years, ultimately falling to the Golden State Warriors in a seven-game first-round series.

On July 6, 2025, the Rockets traded Jalen Green and Dillon Brooks to the Phoenix Suns in a seven-team trade in exchange for perennial All-Star Kevin Durant.

On March 21, 2026, Durant became the fifth all-time leading scorer in NBA history in front of the home fans. Durant said," It is great to be cheered and not booed in Houston." On April 29, during the first round of the 2026 NBA playoffs, the Rockets became the sixth team in NBA history to force a game 6 after trailing 3–0 with both wins coming without Kevin Durant. However, they lost that game and were eliminated by the Los Angeles Lakers.

== Season-by-season record ==
List of the last five seasons completed by the Rockets. For the full season-by-season history, see List of Houston Rockets seasons.

Note: GP = Games played, W = Wins, L = Losses, W–L% = Winning percentage

Season	GP	W	L	W–L%	Finish	Playoffs
2021–22	82	20	62	.244	5th, Southwest	Did not qualify
2022–23	82	22	60	.268	4th, Southwest	Did not qualify
2023–24	82	41	41	.500	3rd, Southwest	Did not qualify
2024–25	82	52	30	.634	1st, Southwest	Lost in first round, 3–4 (Warriors)
2025–26	82	52	30	.634	2nd, Southwest	Lost in first round, 2–4 (Lakers)

== Home arenas ==
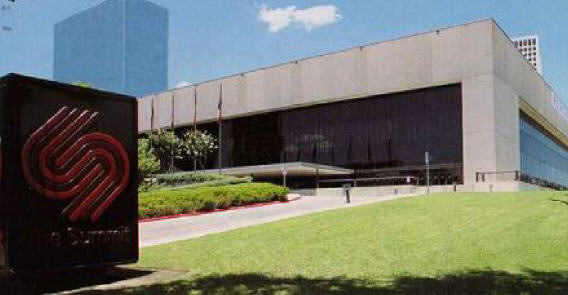
The Summit (later Compaq Center) hosted the Rockets from 1975 to 2003, and was also the site where the Rockets won both of their NBA titles in 1994 and 1995. Today the site is the worship center for Lakewood Church.

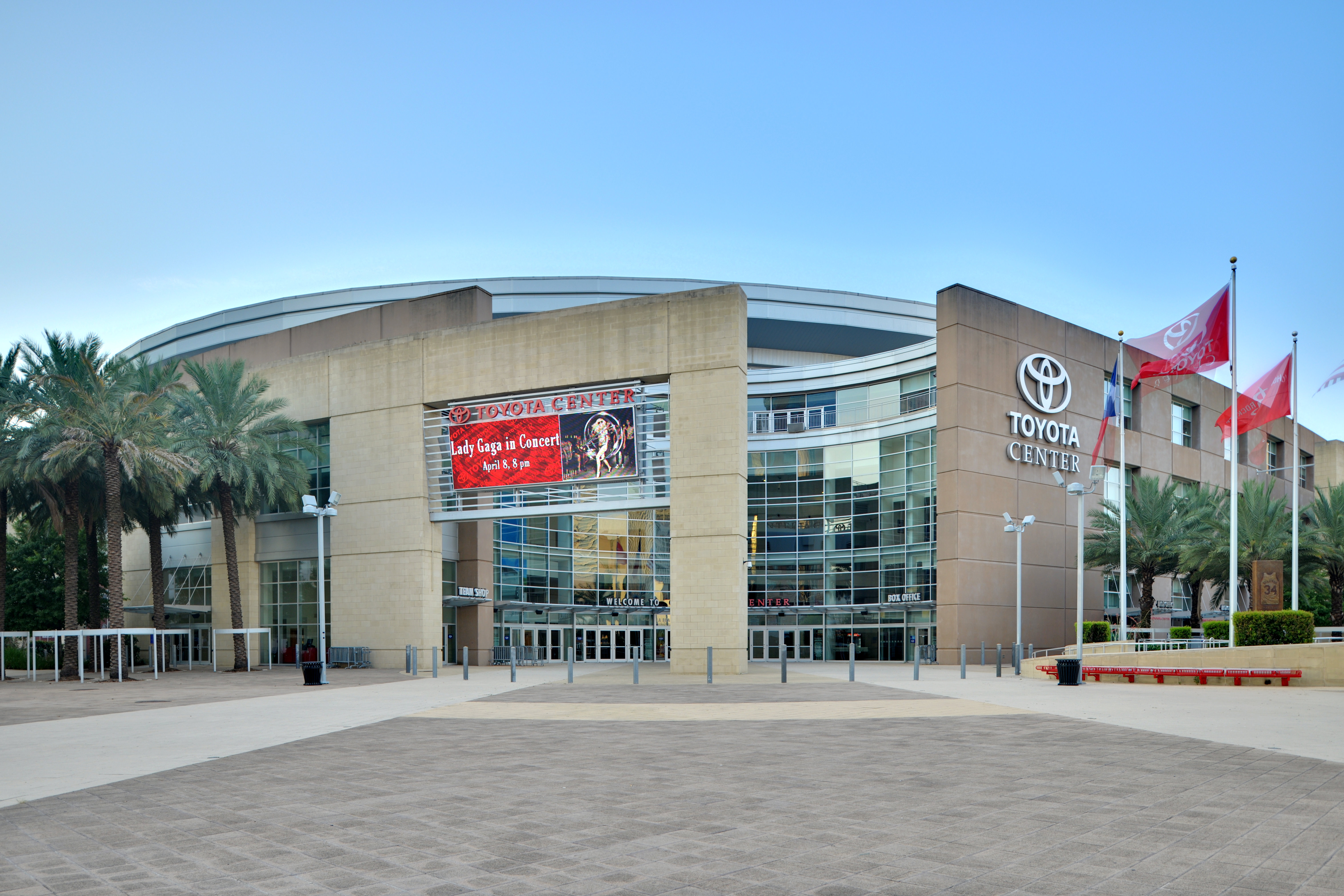
Toyota Center is the current home of the Houston Rockets.

During the four years the Rockets were in San Diego, they played their games in the San Diego Sports Arena, which had a seating capacity of 14,400. In their first season after moving to Houston, the Rockets did not have their own arena, and they played their first two years at various venues in the city, including the Astrodome, AstroHall, Sam Houston Coliseum and Hofheinz Pavilion, the latter eventually being adopted as their home arena until 1975. They also had to play "home" games in other cities such as San Antonio, Waco, Albuquerque, and even San Diego in efforts to extend the fan-base. During their first season, the Rockets averaged less than 5,000 fans per game (roughly half full), and in one game in Waco, there were only 759 fans in attendance.

Their first permanent arena in Houston was the 10,000 seat Hofheinz Pavilion on the campus of the University of Houston, which they moved into starting in their second season. They played in the arena for four years, before occupying The Summit in 1975. The arena, which could hold 16,611 spectators, was their home for the next 28 years. It was renamed the Compaq Center from 1998 to 2003. Following the 1994 title, the Rockets had a sellout streak of 176 consecutive home games, including the playoffs, which lasted until 1999. However, the struggling 2000–01 and 2001–02 seasons saw Houston having the worst attendance average in the league, with less than 12,000 spectators each season.

For the 2003–04 season, the Rockets moved into their new arena, Toyota Center, with a seating capacity of 18,500. During the 2007–08 season where the team achieved a 22-game winning streak, the Rockets got their best numbers to date, averaging 17,379 spectators. These were exceeded once James Harden joined the team in 2012. The Rockets averaged 18,123 spectators during the 2013–14 season, selling out 39 out of the 41 home games. The 2014–15 season had even better numbers, with 40 sellouts and an average of 18,230 tickets sold.

== Team identity ==
=== Uniforms and logos ===
When the Rockets debuted in San Diego, their colors were green and gold. Road uniforms featured the city name, while the home uniforms feature the team name, both in a serifed block lettering. This was the only uniform design the Rockets would use throughout their years in San Diego. The Rockets' first logo featured a rocket streaking with a basketball surrounded by the team name.

Upon moving to Houston in 1971, the Rockets replaced green with red. They kept the same design from their San Diego days, save for the change of color and city name. The logo used is of a player with a spinning basketball launching upward, with boosters on his back, leaving a trail of red and gold flames and the words "Houston Rockets" below it.

For the 1972–73 season, the Rockets introduced the famous "ketchup and mustard" logo, so dubbed by fans, featuring a gold basketball surrounded by two red trails, with "Houston" atop the first red trail and "Rockets" (all capitalized save for the lowercase 'E' and 'T') in black surrounding the basketball. The initial home uniforms, used until the 1975–76 season, features the city name, numbers and serifed player name in red with gold trim, while the away uniforms feature the city name (all capitalized except for the lower case 'T' and 'N'), numbers and serifed player name in gold with white trim.

In the 1976–77 season, the Rockets modified their uniforms, featuring a monotone look on the Cooper Black fonts and white lettering on the road uniforms. On the home shorts, the team logo is located on the right leg, while the away shorts feature the team name wordmark on the same location. With minor modifications in the number font, this version was used in all four of their NBA Finals appearances, including their 1994 and 1995 championships.

Following the 1995 title, the Rockets opted to modernize their look. After a fan contest with over 5,000 entries, the team went with the idea of Missouri City artist Thomas Nash of a rocket orbiting a basketball, which was then reworked by Houston designer Chris Hill. Nash would later sue the Rockets for breach of contract, given they were using his idea despite not having paid the contest prizes. The NBA suggested that the identity should follow the cartoon-inspired imagery that other teams adopted during the 1990s, leading to a rocket painted with sharkmouth nose art orbiting a basketball. Red was retained, but navy blue and silver became the uniform's primary colors. Both the home white and away navy uniforms featured gradient-fading pinstripes and futuristic number fonts, with side stripes of navy fading to red. This was used until the 2002–03 season.

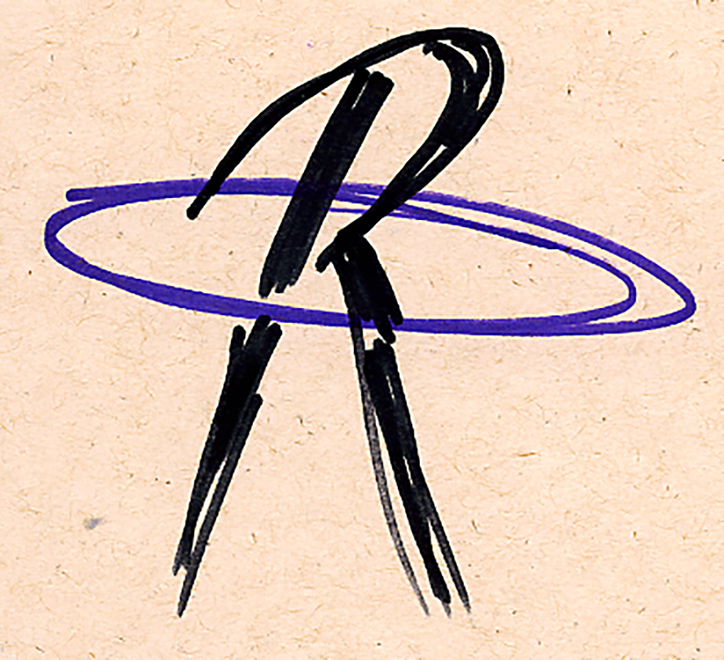
Back-of-the-napkin original sketch for NBA's Houston Rockets logo by Rafael Esquer in 2002

The Rockets released simplified logos and uniforms in the 2003–04 season, which were created by Japanese designer Eiko Ishioka in collaboration with Rafael Esquer of New York-based Alfalfa Studio. The Rockets identity was the third creative collaboration by Ishioka and Esquer; she focused on the uniform, and he on the logo and custom typeface. The logo is a stylized 'R' in the shape of a rocket during takeoff, surrounded by a red orbit streak that can be interpreted as the central circle of a basketball court; it won the Merit Award from Graphis in their Logo Design 6 competition. Said "R" inspired the team's new custom typeface, which Esquer designed so that every single digit could be read well from a distance, whether in the arena or on television. Red once again became the dominant color, with silver and black as secondary. Because the uniforms and the logo were designed in tandem by Ishioka and Esquer, the complete look was organic and fluid. Julius Wiedemann, an editor at Taschen, wrote, "Their organic and collaborative design process has produced the most innovative and popular identity the NBA has seen in years." In 2009, the Rockets invoked the championship years with an alternate red uniform, featuring gold numbers and side stripes. The Rockets had two sleeved alternate jerseys for the 2015–16 season, an alternate silver-colored uniform whose design referenced the design of NASA's Gemini-Titan rocket, and a red and gold jersey featuring the nickname "Clutch City". For the 2016–17 season, the Rockets began to wear a black alternate uniform.

Following the switch to Nike in 2017, the Rockets made some slight tweaks to the uniform. While the black "Statement" uniform remained mostly unchanged, the red "Icon" and white "Association" uniforms now feature truncated side striping that no longer wrap around the shoulders. The Rockets also wore a "City" uniform that was similar to their red "Icon" uniforms but with Chinese lettering in place of "Rockets" in front; the design was tweaked the following season with a deeper red and old gold accents.

On June 6, 2019, the Rockets unveiled a new secondary logo that depicts a basketball as a planet, and the ring has the "Houston Rockets" displayed with the classic "R" in the middle. A new uniform set was unveiled two weeks later. The red "Icon" and white "Association" designs featured updated block lettering and bold side panels that depict a launching rocket. The black "Statement" uniform remained with a few alterations. In addition, the Rockets brought back their throwback "ketchup and mustard" 1976–95 red uniform as part of Nike's "Classic" series. For the 2019–20 "City" uniform, the Rockets eschewed the Chinese New Year-themed designs and went with a NASA-inspired space theme. This uniform was brought back for the 2026–27 season.

The Rockets' "City" uniform for the 2020–21 season featured a powder blue base as a nod to the city of Houston. The colors resembled those of Houston's former NFL team, the Houston Oilers. For the 2021–22 season, the Rockets announced a partnership with Credit Karma to be featured on the team's jerseys as a sponsor.

The 2021–22 Rockets' "City" uniform referenced various uniform designs from the past. The navy base and white pinstripes were taken from the 1995–2003 uniforms. The modified "ketchup and mustard" logo on the waist, as well as a diagonally arranged "Houston" wordmark and block numbers, paid tribute to the 1975–1995 uniforms. The modern "R" logo and white double arches on the side were an homage to the 2003–2019 uniforms. The Rockets retained this "City" uniform in the 2022–23 season.

For the 2023–24 "City" uniform, the Rockets drew inspiration from the uniforms worn by the Phi Slama Jama-era Houston Cougars of the early 1980s. A nod to both teams' legends Hakeem Olajuwon and Clyde Drexler, the white-based uniform featured "H-Town" in red cursive letters with white and blue trim, along with block numbers. The uniforms would also be paired with an alternate court specific to the 2023 NBA in-season tournament, featuring a red base with a middle blue strip and silhouettes of the NBA Cup. This uniform was reused in the 2025–26 season.

The "H-Town" theme returned for the 2024–25 "City" uniform, this time honoring the 30th anniversary of the Rockets' 1994 and 1995 championships. The design featured "H-Town" (with 't' and 'n' in lowercase letters) in a wordmark similar to the team's 1972–1995 logo, and the black trim along the uniform was shaped after the team's championship banners. The logo of the team's previous home The Summit was emblazoned on the beltline, and the center court logo from that era was placed on the white space between the black piping. Signatures of Hakeem Olajuwon and Clyde Drexler, along with the phrases "BELIEVE IT! AGAIN!", were placed on the bottom of the jersey.

Prior to the 2026–27 season, the Rockets brought back the red and yellow color scheme associated with the franchise's two championship seasons. The stylized "R" logo that was introduced in 2003 remained, but with the drop shadow now in yellow. The "Dunkstronaut" alternate logo introduced from the 2023–24 "City" uniform was retained as part of their core identity. New wordmarks inspired by the 1973–1995 logo were also introduced. The red and yellow-accented "Icon" and "Association" uniforms featured various design cues from past uniforms, including the subtle gray pinstripes of the 1995–2003 uniforms and the shorts' cone-shaped lines within the "R" that was used on the 2003–2019 uniforms. The "Statement" uniform remained black with visual cues inspired by Houston's history of space exploration.

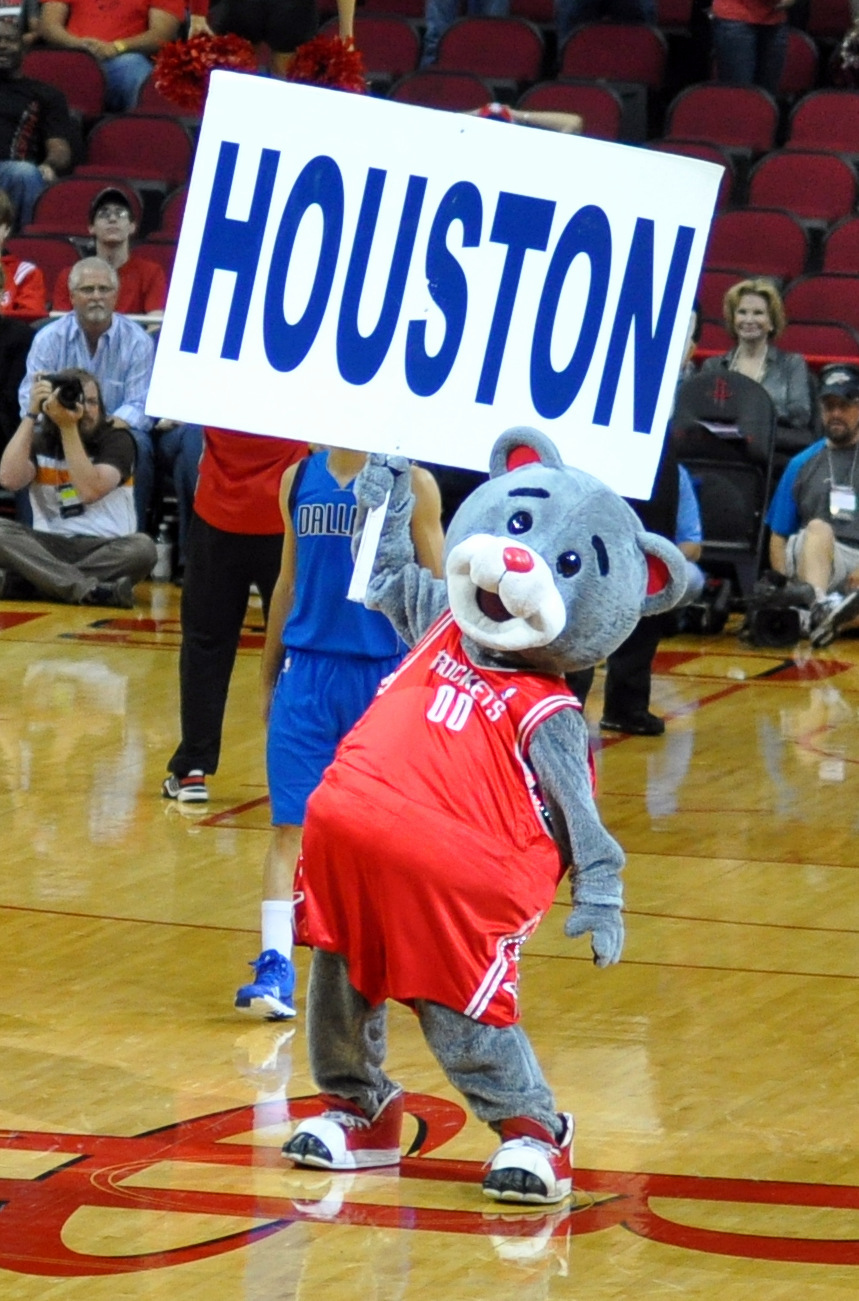
Clutch the Bear is the Rockets' mascot.

=== Mascots ===
The mascot was introduced on March 14, 1995, formerly known as "Clutch" . From 1993 to 1995, the mascot was Turbo, a costumed man that performed acrobatic dunks and other maneuvers. In 1995, the Rockets debuted Clutch the Bear as a second mascot, a large teddy bear-like mascot that performs a variety of acts during the games. After eight years of serving as dual mascots, the performer playing Turbo retired, making Clutch the sole mascot for the team. The mascot was considered and voted fifth for the most recognizable mascot in the league, and was also inducted in the 2006 Mascot Hall of Fame.

=== Rivalries ===
The Rockets have developed many rivalries within the Western Conference ever since the team returned there in 1980. Two are intrastate rivalries, with the San Antonio Spurs, who moved along with the Rockets after four years with them in the Eastern Conference, and the Dallas Mavericks, introduced that very season. Houston has faced both Texas teams in the playoffs since 1980, beating the Spurs three times and losing once. The Rockets lost twice to the Mavericks, while beating them once.

Other famed rivalries were with the Los Angeles Lakers, who in the 1980s Showtime era only missed the NBA Finals when beaten by the Rockets, and the Utah Jazz, who in the 1990s the Rockets beat in both championship seasons but were defeated by Utah in five other occasions.

== Honors and statistics ==
=== Individual honors ===
**NBA Most Valuable Player Award**

- Moses Malone – 1979, 1982
- Hakeem Olajuwon – 1994
- James Harden – 2018

**NBA Finals MVP**

- Hakeem Olajuwon – 1994, 1995

**NBA Scoring Champions**

- Elvin Hayes – 1969
- James Harden – 2018, 2019, 2020

**NBA Defensive Player of the Year**

- Hakeem Olajuwon – 1993, 1994

**NBA Rookie of the Year**

- Ralph Sampson – 1984
- Steve Francis – 2000

**NBA Sixth Man of the Year**

- Eric Gordon – 2017

**NBA Most Improved Player**

- Aaron Brooks – 2010

**NBA Coach of the Year**

- Tom Nissalke – 1977
- Don Chaney – 1991
- Mike D'Antoni – 2017

**NBA Executive of the Year**

- Ray Patterson – 1977
- Daryl Morey – 2018

**J. Walter Kennedy Citizenship Award**

- Calvin Murphy – 1979
- Dikembe Mutombo – 2009

**NBA Hustle Award**

- Patrick Beverley – 2017

**Best NBA Player ESPY Award**

- Hakeem Olajuwon – 1995, 1996

**NBA All-Defensive First Team**

- Hakeem Olajuwon – 1987, 1988, 1990, 1993, 1994
- Rodney McCray – 1988
- Scottie Pippen – 1999
- Patrick Beverley – 2017
- Amen Thompson – 2025

**NBA All-Defensive Second Team**

- Moses Malone – 1979
- Hakeem Olajuwon – 1985, 1991, 1996, 1997
- Rodney McCray – 1987
- Shane Battier – 2008, 2009
- Ron Artest – 2009
- Patrick Beverley – 2014

**NBA All-Rookie First Team**

- Elvin Hayes – 1969
- Calvin Murphy – 1971
- Joe Meriweather – 1976
- John Lucas – 1977
- Ralph Sampson – 1984
- Hakeem Olajuwon – 1985
- Steve Francis – 2000
- Yao Ming – 2003
- Luis Scola – 2008
- Jae'Sean Tate – 2021
- Jalen Green – 2022

**NBA All-Rookie Second Team**

- Robert Horry – 1993
- Matt Maloney – 1997
- Cuttino Mobley – 1999
- Michael Dickerson – 1999
- Eddie Griffin – 2002
- Luther Head – 2006
- Carl Landry – 2008
- Chandler Parsons – 2012
- Tari Eason – 2023
- Jabari Smith Jr. – 2023
- Amen Thompson – 2024

**All-NBA First Team**

- Moses Malone – 1979, 1982
- Hakeem Olajuwon – 1987, 1988, 1989, 1993, 1994, 1997
- James Harden – 2014, 2015, 2017, 2018, 2019, 2020

**All-NBA Second Team**

- Moses Malone – 1980, 1981
- Ralph Sampson – 1985
- Hakeem Olajuwon – 1986, 1990, 1996
- Yao Ming – 2007, 2009
- Tracy McGrady – 2007
- Dwight Howard – 2014
- Kevin Durant – 2026

**All-NBA Third Team**

- Hakeem Olajuwon – 1991, 1995, 1999
- Clyde Drexler – 1995
- Yao Ming – 2004, 2006, 2008
- Tracy McGrady – 2005, 2008
- James Harden – 2013
- Russell Westbrook – 2020

=== All-Star Weekend ===
**All-Star**

- Don Kojis – 1968, 1969
- Elvin Hayes – 1969–1972
- Jack Marin – 1973
- Rudy Tomjanovich – 1974–1977, 1979
- Moses Malone – 1978–1982
- Calvin Murphy – 1979
- Ralph Sampson – 1984–1987
- Hakeem Olajuwon – 1985–1990, 1992–1997
- Otis Thorpe – 1992
- Charles Barkley – 1997
- Clyde Drexler – 1996, 1997
- Steve Francis – 2002–2004
- Tracy McGrady – 2005–2007
- Yao Ming – 2003–2009, 2011
- James Harden – 2013–2020
- Dwight Howard – 2014
- Russell Westbrook – 2020
- Alperen Şengün – 2025, 2026
- Kevin Durant – 2026

**All-Star head coach**

- Rudy Tomjanovich – 1997
- Mike D'Antoni – 2018

**All-Star Game MVP**

- Ralph Sampson – 1985

**Three-Point Contest champion**

- Eric Gordon – 2017

**Skills Challenge champion**

- Patrick Beverley – 2015

=== Franchise leaders ===
Bold denotes still active with team. Italics denotes still active but not with team.

Points scored (regular season) (as of the end of the 2025–26 season)

1. Hakeem Olajuwon (26,511)
2. James Harden (18,365)
3. Calvin Murphy (17,949)
4. Rudy Tomjanovich (13,383)
5. Elvin Hayes (11,762)
6. Moses Malone (11,119)
7. Yao Ming (9,247)
8. Robert Reid (8,823)
9. Mike Newlin (8,480)
10. Otis Thorpe (8,177)
11. Cuttino Mobley (7,448)
12. Steve Francis (7,281)
13. Tracy McGrady (6,888)
14. Allen Leavell (6,684)
15. Jalen Green (6,173)
16. **Alperen Şengün** (6,049)
17. Vernon Maxwell (6,002)
18. Ralph Sampson (5,995)
19. Eric Gordon (5,944)
20. Kenny Smith (5,910)
21. Luis Scola (5,597)
22. Rodney McCray (5,059)
23. Sleepy Floyd (5,030)
24. Stu Lantz (4,947)
25. Trevor Ariza (4,863)
26. Lewis Lloyd (4,384)
27. **Clint Capela** (4,357)
28. Clyde Drexler (4,155)
29. Buck Johnson (4,139)
30. John Block (4,138)
31. Don Kojis (4,037)
32. **Jabari Smith Jr.** (3,967)
33. John Lucas II (3,756)
34. Kevin Kunnert (3,550)
35. Aaron Brooks (3,465)
36. Rafer Alston (3,370)
37. Mario Elie (3,356)
38. Robert Horry (3,109)
39. Kevin Martin (3,068)
40. Shane Battier (3,052)
41. Charles Barkley (3,017)
42. **Amen Thompson** (3,005)
43. Chandler Parsons (3,002)
44. Matt Bullard (2,991)
45. Dwight Howard (2,919)
46. Ed Ratleff (2,813)
47. Jim Barnett (2,794)
48. Patrick Beverley (2,708)
49. Mitchell Wiggins (2,648)
50. Maurice Taylor (2,619)

Other Statistics (regular season) (as of the end of the 2025–26 season)

Most minutes played
Player	Minutes
Hakeem Olajuwon	42,844
Calvin Murphy	30,607
Rudy Tomjanovich	25,714
James Harden	23,006
Robert Reid	21,718
Elvin Hayes	20,782
Otis Thorpe	18,631
Moses Malone	17,780
Mike Newlin	17,646
Cuttino Mobley	16,343

Most rebounds
Player	Rebounds
Hakeem Olajuwon	13,382
Elvin Hayes	6,974
Moses Malone	6,959
Rudy Tomjanovich	6,198
Otis Thorpe	5,010
Yao Ming	4,494
James Harden	3,736
Robert Reid	3,706
**Clint Capela**	3,588
Ralph Sampson	3,189

Most assists
Player	Assists
James Harden	4,796
Calvin Murphy	4,402
Allen Leavell	3,339
Hakeem Olajuwon	2,992
Mike Newlin	2,581
Kenny Smith	2,457
Steve Francis	2,411
Sleepy Floyd	2,363
John Lucas II	2,358
Robert Reid	2,253

Most steals
Player	Steals
Hakeem Olajuwon	2,088
Calvin Murphy	1,165
James Harden	1,087
Allen Leavell	929
Robert Reid	881
Trevor Ariza	683
Steve Francis	619
Vernon Maxwell	559
Cuttino Mobley	526
Sleepy Floyd	470

Most blocks
Player	Blocks
Hakeem Olajuwon	3,740
Yao Ming	920
Moses Malone	758
Ralph Sampson	585
**Clint Capela**	554
Kelvin Cato	431
Kevin Kunnert	413
James Harden	390
Robert Reid	364
Shane Battier	351

Most three-pointers made
Player	3-pointers made
James Harden	2,029
Eric Gordon	1,054
Trevor Ariza	876
Jalen Green	779
Vernon Maxwell	730
Cuttino Mobley	672
Shane Battier	576
Matt Bullard	557
**Jabari Smith Jr.**	533
Kenny Smith	521

== Personnel ==
=== Current roster ===
Houston Rockets roster
Players

Pos.	No.	Player	Height	Weight	DOB	From
C	12	Steven Adams (injured)	6 ft 11 in (2.11 m)	279 lb (127 kg)	1993-07-20	Pittsburgh
G	31	Bogdan Bogdanović	6 ft 5 in (1.96 m)	231 lb (105 kg)	1992-08-18	Serbia
C	30	Clint Capela	6 ft 10 in (2.08 m)	256 lb (116 kg)	1994-05-18	Switzerland
G	25	Quadir Copeland (TW)	6 ft 5 in (1.96 m)	214 lb (97 kg)	2003-09-04	NC State
F	27	Isaiah Crawford	6 ft 6 in (1.98 m)	225 lb (102 kg)	2001-11-01	Louisiana Tech
F	7	Kevin Durant	6 ft 11 in (2.11 m)	234 lb (106 kg)	1988-09-29	Texas
F	17	Tari Eason	6 ft 8 in (2.03 m)	229 lb (104 kg)	2001-05-10	LSU
F	3	Julian Phillips (TW)	6 ft 7 in (2.01 m)	205 lb (93 kg)	2003-11-05	Tennessee
C	28	Alperen Şengün	6 ft 11 in (2.11 m)	271 lb (123 kg)	2002-07-25	Turkey
G	15	Reed Sheppard	6 ft 2 in (1.88 m)	189 lb (86 kg)	2004-06-24	Kentucky
G	36	Marcus Smart	6 ft 3 in (1.91 m)	220 lb (100 kg)	1994-03-06	Oklahoma State
F	10	Jabari Smith Jr.	6 ft 11 in (2.11 m)	231 lb (105 kg)	2003-05-13	Auburn
F	8	Jae'Sean Tate	6 ft 4 in (1.93 m)	239 lb (108 kg)	1995-10-28	Ohio State
G/F	1	Amen Thompson	6 ft 7 in (2.01 m)	227 lb (103 kg)	2003-01-30	Pine Crest (FL)
G	2	Bruce Thornton	6 ft 0 in (1.83 m)	229 lb (104 kg)	2003-09-14	Ohio State
F/C	9	Oscar Tshiebwe (TW)	6 ft 8 in (2.03 m)	270 lb (122 kg)	1999-11-27	Kentucky
G	5	Fred VanVleet	6 ft 0 in (1.83 m)	213 lb (97 kg)	1994-02-25	Wichita State

Coaches
Head coach
- Ime Udoka
Assistant(s)
- Josh Bostic
- Will Dunn
- Chip Engelland
- Cam Hodges
- Royal Ivey
- Garrett Jackson
- Robbie Lemons
- Ben Sullivan

Legend
- (DP) Unsigned draft pick
- (FA) Free agent
- (S) Suspended
- (GL) On assignment to G League affiliate
- (TW) Two-way affiliate player
- Injured

Roster
Updated: November 3, 2026

=== Retained draft rights ===
The Rockets currently do not own the draft rights to unsigned draft picks who have been playing outside the NBA.

A drafted player, either an international draftee or a college draftee who is not signed by the team that drafted him, is allowed to sign with any non-NBA teams. In this case, the team retains the player's draft rights in the NBA until one year after the player's contract with the non-NBA team ends. This list includes draft rights that were acquired from trades with other teams.

=== Retired numbers ===
Houston Rockets retired numbers
No.	Player	Position	Tenure	Ceremony date
11	Yao Ming	C	2002–2011	February 3, 2017
22	Clyde Drexler	G	1995–1998	February 3, 2000
23	Calvin Murphy	G	1970–1983	March 17, 1984
24	Moses Malone	C	1976–1982	April 19, 1998
34	Hakeem Olajuwon	C	1984–2001	November 9, 2002
44	Elvin Hayes	F/C	1968–1972; 1981–1984	November 18, 2022
45	Rudy Tomjanovich	F^{1}	1970–1981	January 28, 1982
CD	Carroll Dawson	Assistant coach General manager^{2}	1980–2007	April 16, 2007

- ^{1} Also served as head coach (1991–2003).
- ^{2} As Dawson did not play for the Rockets, the team used his initials.
- The NBA retired Bill Russell's No. 6 for all its member teams on August 11, 2022.

=== Basketball Hall of Famers ===
Houston Rockets Hall of Famers
Players
No.	Name	Position	Tenure	Inducted
2; 4	Rick Barry	F	1978–1980	1987
11; 44	Elvin Hayes	C/F	1968–1972; 1981–1984	1990
23	Calvin Murphy	G	1970–1983	1993
21; 24	Moses Malone	C/F	1976–1982	2001
22	Clyde Drexler ^{1}	G/F	1995–1998	2004
4	Charles Barkley ^{1}	F	1996–2000	2006
34	Hakeem Olajuwon	C	1984–2001	2008
33	Scottie Pippen ^{1}	F	1999	2010
50	Ralph Sampson	C/F	1983–1987	2012
55	Dikembe Mutombo	C	2004–2009	2015
11	Yao Ming	C	2002–2011	2016
1; 3	Tracy McGrady	G/F	2004–2010	2017
7	Carmelo Anthony ^{2}	F	2018–2019	2025
12	Dwight Howard ^{2}	C	2013–2016	2025
Coaches
Name		Position	Tenure	Inducted
Alex Hannum		Head coach	1969–1971	1998
Tex Winter		Head coach	1971–1973	2011
Bill Fitch		Head coach	1983–1988	2019
45	Rudy Tomjanovich ^{3}	Head coach	1992–2003	2020
12	Rick Adelman ^{4}	Head coach	2007–2011	2021
Contributors
Name		Position	Tenure	Inducted
Pete Newell ^{5}		General manager	1968–1971	1979
Del Harris		Assistant coach Head coach	1976–1979; 1979–1983	2022
Mike D'Antoni ^{6}		Head coach	2016–2020	2026

Notes:

- ^{1} All three players were also inducted to the Hall of Fame as members of the 1992 Olympic team.
- ^{2} In total, Anthony and Howard were inducted into the Hall of Fame twice – as player and as a member of the 2008 Olympic team.
- ^{3} Tomjanovich also played for the Rockets from 1970 to 1981 and served as assistant coach from 1983 to 1992.
- ^{4} Adelman also played for the Rockets from 1968 to 1970.
- ^{5} In total, Newell was inducted into the Hall of Fame twice – as contributor and as a member of the 1960 Olympic team.
- ^{6} In total, D'Antoni was inducted into the Hall of Fame twice – as contributor and as a member of the 2008 Olympic team.

=== FIBA Hall of Famers ===
Houston Rockets Hall of Famers
Players
No.	Name	Position	Tenure	Inducted
34	Hakeem Olajuwon	C	1984–2001	2016
11	Yao Ming	C	2002–2011	2023

== Management ==
=== General managers ===
GM history
GM	Tenure
Jack McMahon	Mar 1967 – June 1968
Pete Newell	June 1968 – May 1972
Ray Patterson	May 1972 – September 1989
Steve Patterson	September 1989 – August 1993
Tod Leiweke	August 1993–January 1994
Bob Weinhauer	January 1994 – May 1996
Carroll Dawson	May 1996 – May 2007
Daryl Morey	May 2007–October 2020
Rafael Stone	October 2020–present

=== Owners ===
Ownership history
Owner	Tenure
Robert Breitbard	January 1967 – June 1971
Billy Goldberg, Wayne Duddlesten, Mickey Herskowitz	June 1971 – December 1973
Irvin Kaplan	December 1973 – September 1975
Wayne Duddlesten and Ray Patterson	September 1975 – February 1977
Kenneth Schnitzer	February 1977 – May 1979
George J. Maloof, Sr.	May 1979 – November 1980
Gavin Maloof	November 1980 – June 1982
Charlie Thomas	June 1982 – July 1993
Leslie Alexander	July 1993 – October 2017
Tilman Fertitta	October 2017 – present

== Head coaches ==
San Diego Rockets

Coach	Tenure
Jack McMahon	1968–1970
Alex Hannum	1970–1971

Houston Rockets

Coach	Tenure
Tex Winter	1971–1973
Johnny Egan	1973–1976
Tom Nissalke	1976–1979
Del Harris	1979–1983
Bill Fitch	1983–1988
Don Chaney	1988–1992
Rudy Tomjanovich	1992–2003
Jeff Van Gundy	2003–2007
Rick Adelman	2007–2011
Kevin McHale	2011–2015
J. B. Bickerstaff (interim)	2015–2016
Mike D'Antoni	2016–2020
Stephen Silas	2020–2023
Ime Udoka	2023–present

== Politics ==
On October 4, 2019, the Rockets' general manager Daryl Morey issued a tweet that supported the 2019–20 Hong Kong protests, which drew criticism from the Rockets' owner Tilman Fertitta who said that while Morey was the best general manager in the NBA, the Rockets were not a political organization. Morey later deleted the tweet. Morey's tweet resulted in the Chinese Basketball Association's suspension of its relationship with the Rockets and the issuance of a statement of dissatisfaction from the consulate office of China in Houston. On October 6, Morey and the NBA each issued a separate statement addressing the original tweet; Morey said that he never intended his tweet to cause any offense, while the NBA said the tweet was "Regrettable". The statements drew attention and subsequent bipartisan criticism from several US politicians. Chinese media outlets, including the Chinese Communist Party-run People's Daily, described Morey and the NBA's statements as non-apologetic and unacceptable, because they did not contain the word "apologize".

== Notes ==
Preceded by Chicago Bulls	NBA champions 1993–94, 1994–95	Succeeded by Chicago Bulls
