= Bob Whitsitt =

American sports executive

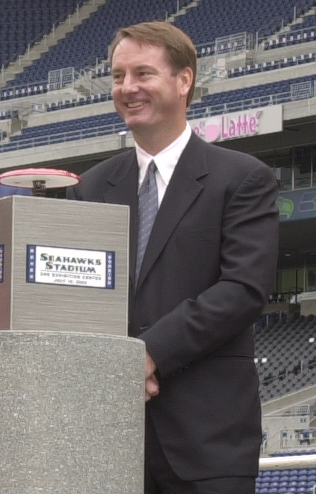
Whitsitt in 2002

Bob Whitsitt is a former sports executive in both the National Basketball Association (NBA) and the National Football League (NFL). He has served as the general manager (or in an equivalent role) for three teams: the Seattle SuperSonics and Portland Trail Blazers of the NBA, and the Seattle Seahawks of the NFL. Whitsitt, commonly known as "Trader Bob" for his penchant for making blockbuster deals, has met with mixed success in both leagues.

== Sacramento Kings ==
During his tenure as vice president and assistant general manager of the Sacramento Kings, Bob Whitsitt played an instrumental role in securing the naming-rights sponsorship for the team's new arena in Sacramento. After team owner Gregg Lukenbill proposed the idea of selling the arena's naming rights, Whitsitt developed the sponsorship opportunity and negotiated the agreement with Atlantic Richfield Company (ARCO). The agreement resulted in the arena being named ARCO Arena, the first naming rights sponsorship in NBA history.

== Seattle SuperSonics ==
He was hailed as the architect of the 1995-1996 Sonics team that went to the NBA Finals (and lost to the Chicago Bulls); several years before that Whitsitt shocked many observers by drafting Shawn Kemp, a promising player who had never played a game of college ball. At the end of the 1993–94 NBA season, he was awarded the NBA Executive of the Year Award after the SuperSonics went from 55 to 27 (and third in the Western Conference) the previous season to a 63–19 record and the number 1 seed in the Western Conference. However, after a falling-out with then Sonics owner Barry Ackerley, Whitsitt resigned his position with the Sonics in 1994. In the eight seasons he was the general manager of the SuperSonics, the team had a total record of 377–279.

== Portland Trail Blazers ==
After leaving Seattle, Whitsitt became president and general manager of the Portland Trail Blazers, owned by Paul Allen.

During the first two years of his tenure, Whitsitt oversaw an aging roster that had been to the Finals earlier in the decade, but needed serious retooling.

In the 1996 off-season, Whitsitt began to make his mark with several moves. He traded for guard Isaiah Rider and forward Rasheed Wallace, and signed guard Kenny Anderson to a free agent contract. He also drafted high-school player Jermaine O'Neal in the draft. These moves made the Blazers a better team in the short run, as in 1999 and 2000 the Blazers advanced to the Western Conference finals.

The off-court criminal activity of some players Whitsitt acquired began to grate on the Portland fan base; many started to refer to the team as the "Jail Blazers". Whitsitt's reputation started to turn sour after the 2000 season, when the team executed several controversial moves. Popular player Brian Grant opted out of the final three years of his contract and was traded away in exchange for Shawn Kemp; and center-forward Jermaine O'Neal was traded for Dale Davis. Both players were unhappy with their roles and asked to be traded. These moves were made to push the team "over the hump" after two consecutive appearances in the conference finals, but they backfired spectacularly—Kemp struggled with both on and off-court issues before being waived by the Blazers prior to the 2002–03 season, while O'Neal went on to become an All-Star for the Indiana Pacers. In addition, Whitsitt further alienated the Portland fan base by acquiring Seattle forward Ruben Patterson, a convicted sex offender, via free agency.

Even before the disastrous 2000 off-season, many questioned Whitsitt's evaluation of basketball talent. For one thing, Whitsitt never shied away from players with checkered pasts; this often upset fans; it was also alleged that such players—while talented—lacked the emotional maturity necessary to be a "winner". For another thing, Whitsitt was accused of not paying attention to team "chemistry", or how the various players might interact on the floor (or in the locker room). Whitsitt himself was famously quoted as saying that he "never studied chemistry in college". The result of this, it is claimed, are teams that make inefficient use of the talents available; or which are "less than the sum of their parts". Whitsitt has also been criticized for attempting to stock teams with "All-Star" caliber players (including for bench roles), leading to conflicts over playing time and reduced team camaraderie.

Many other players acquired by Whitsitt have had significant off-court or legal issues (either with the Blazers or elsewhere); these include:

- Gary Trent (drafted in 1995)
- Jermaine O'Neal (drafted in 1996)
- Rasheed Wallace (acquired by trade in 1996)
- Isaiah Rider (acquired by trade in 1996)
- Damon Stoudamire (acquired by trade in 1998)
- Bonzi Wells (drafted in 1999)
- Shawn Kemp (acquired by trade in 2000)
- Rod Strickland (signed as free agent in 2001)
- Zach Randolph (drafted in 2001)
- Ruben Patterson (signed as free agent in 2001)
- Qyntel Woods (drafted in 2002)

After the 2003 season, Whitsitt resigned his position with the Trail Blazers and was replaced with Steve Patterson as the team president and John Nash as the general manager. In his 9 seasons, the Trail Blazers had gone 426–280 with postseason appearances in every season and one division title, but after two straight seasons of losing in the Conference Finals they failed to get past the first round in the following three seasons as GM, with the team falling to 10th place in the conference the season after his resignation.

== Seattle Seahawks ==
Several years after hiring Whitsitt to run the Trail Blazers; Paul Allen gave him a second role as president of the Seattle Seahawks in 1997. Whitsitt is a self-proclaimed "basketball guy", being more knowledgeable about basketball than about football; for this reason his role with the Seahawks was primarily involved with business management. Decisions on players were generally left to others, until after his resignation in 2003 as GM of the Trail Blazers, when he installed himself as the ultimate decision maker of personnel in the Seahawks organization. This caused much friction due to his poor decision-making and basketball background making him poorly suited as an NFL GM, especially with coach Mike Holmgren over the possibility of letting Matt Hasselbeck leave the team for free agency. The powerplay is generally viewed as the catalyst that ultimately lead to his firing after the 2004 season.

While president of the Seahawks, Whitsitt oversaw three major changes to the team. First, he helped negotiate the development of CenturyLink Field, the stadium the team plays its home games in (this facility replaced the aging Kingdome). Second, Whitsitt hired Mike Holmgren (formerly of the Green Bay Packers as coach of the Seahawks (and later as general manager), and third, the team moved from the American Football Conference (where it played from 1977 to 2001) back to the National Football Conference (where they played in their inaugural season of 1976) in 2002.

In 2004, Whitsitt was diagnosed with a growth on his colon (which was surgically removed); he made a full recovery.

After the 2004–2005 season, in a move which has been widely praised by both the Portland and Seattle sports media, Whitsitt was suddenly (and unexpectedly) fired as president of the Seahawks after losing a power struggle with Holmgren; he was replaced in that position by Tim Ruskell. The move paid dividends, as the following year the Seahawks won the NFC championship, advancing to Super Bowl XL.

== Personal life ==
Whitsitt and his wife now run a business consulting practice in the Seattle area.

Sporting positions
Preceded by David Behring	Seattle Seahawks President; 1996–2004	Succeeded by Tim Ruskell
Preceded by Harry Glickman	Portland Trail Blazers President; 1994–2003	Succeeded by Steve Patterson
Preceded by Geoff Petrie	Portland Trail Blazers General Manager; 1994–2003	Succeeded by John Nash
Preceded by Lenny Wilkens	Seattle SuperSonics General Manager; 1986–1994	Succeeded by Wally Walker
