= Rafael Stone =

American sports executive

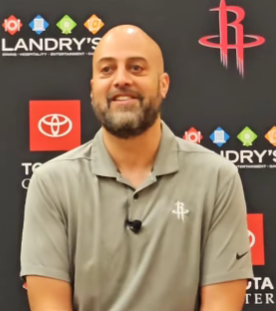
- Stone in 2024

Houston Rockets
- Position: General manager
- League: NBA

Personal information
- Born: June 16, 1972 (age 54) Seattle, Washington, U.S.

Career information
- College: Williams College (BA); Stanford University (JD)

Career history
- 2020–present: Houston Rockets

Rafael Stone (born June 16, 1972) is the general manager of the Houston Rockets.

== Early life ==
A Seattle native, Stone is the oldest of three children. He earned an undergraduate degree in African American studies and political science from Williams College in Massachusetts, where he also played Division III basketball for four seasons. After graduating from Stanford Law School, Stone worked as an associate and then as a partner at New York City-based Dewey Ballantine LLP's mergers and acquisitions and capital markets group.

== Executive career ==
Stone joined the Rockets in 2005 as general counsel and was later promoted to executive vice president of basketball operations while still serving as general counsel. As general counsel, he was responsible for all legal matters related to the franchise and its arena, Toyota Center, including player contracts, trades, business transactions, and concerts.

He was named general manager of the Houston Rockets by owner Tilman J. Fertitta on Oct. 15, 2020. One of Stone's earliest transactions as Rockets GM was trading Robert Covington to Portland in exchange for Trevor Ariza, a first-round pick, and the rights to Isaiah Stewart, who was the 16th overall pick in the 2020 NBA draft.

Stone then traded Ariza, the rights to Stewart, a second round pick, and cash considerations to Detroit in exchange for Christian Wood, a first-round pick, and a second round pick. Wood went onto finish fourth in voting for the Most Improved Player award in 2020-21 while averaging career-highs of 21.0 points and 9.6 rebounds.

On January 22, 2021, Stone acquired Kevin Porter Jr. from Cleveland in exchange for a second round pick. Porter averaged 16.6 points, 6.3 assists, and 3.8 rebounds over the remainder of the season and joined Memphis’ Ja Morant as the only sophomores in 2020–21 to have averaged at least 16.0 ppg, 6.0 apg, and 3.0 rpg.

During the 2021 NBA draft, Houston acquired four players within the first 24 picks, all of whom were 19-years-old heading into the 2021-22 season. The Rockets drafted Jalen Green with the second overall pick, Usman Garuba 23rd, and Josh Christopher 24th, while obtaining the rights to Alperen Sengun, who was the 16th overall pick by Oklahoma City. The pick used to acquire Garuba was obtained from Portland as part of the Covington deal, while the pick used to select Christopher came from a four-team trade Houston made with Brooklyn, Cleveland, and Indiana on Jan. 16, 2021.

== Personal life ==
His father, Rafael Stone, played point guard at the University of Washington in the late 1960s and was coached by future Hall of Famer Tex Winter for his final two seasons. He chose a career in law rather than to pursue playing basketball professionally and became the first black lawyer hired by a major Seattle firm.

Stone and his wife have three children.
