= Ray Patterson (basketball) =

American basketball player (1922–2011)

Personal information
- Born: January 15, 1922 Lafayette, Indiana, U.S.
- Died: August 3, 2011 (aged 89) Sugar Land, Texas, U.S.
- Listed height: 6 ft 2 in (1.88 m)
- Listed weight: 195 lb (88 kg)

Career information
- High school: Wayland Academy (Beaver Dam, Wisconsin)
- College: Wisconsin (1942–1945)
- Playing career: 1945–1952
- Position: Forward

Career history

Playing
- 1945–1947: Midland Dow
- 1947–1948: Flint Dow A.C.'s
- 1948–1949: Beaver Dam Olo Soap
- 1949–1950: Fond du Lac
- 1951–1952: Sheboygan Red Skins

Coaching
- 1948–1954: Wayland Academy

Raymond Albert Patterson Jr. (January 15, 1922 – August 3, 2011) was general manager of the NBA's Houston Rockets from 1972 to 1990. He was named NBA Executive of the Year in 1977, and his Rockets appeared in the NBA Finals in 1981 and 1986. Among his most notable player acquisitions were Ralph Sampson in 1983 and Hakeem Olajuwon in 1984. He left the Rockets in 1990 with hopes of becoming co-owner of an NHL team in Houston, and was succeeded by his son, Steve. Ray Patterson's NHL dreams never materialized, but he helped found an International Hockey League franchise, the Houston Aeros, in 1994.

Patterson attended the University of Wisconsin-Madison. He was an All-American high jumper for the Wisconsin Badgers track and field team, finishing 4th at the 1944 NCAA track and field championships.

During the 1940s, Patterson played professional basketball for the Flint Dow A.C.'s of the NBL.

From 1968 to 1972, Patterson served as president, and part-time GM, for the Milwaukee Bucks. Patterson drafted Lew Alcindor with the first overall pick in the 1969 draft and traded for Oscar Robertson in 1970. Led by the pair, the Bucks won their first NBA championship in 1971. Over his career, Patterson was responsible for the drafting, trading, or signing of nine Naismith Memorial Basketball Hall of Fame players.

Patterson died on August 3, 2011, at age 89.
