= Tod Leiweke =

American sports executive (born 1960)

- Born: January 12, 1960 (age 66); St. Louis, Missouri, U.S.
- Occupations: CEO, One Roof Sports & Entertainment
- Known for: Owner, Seattle Kraken
- Children: 2
- Relatives: Tim Leiweke (brother)

Tod Leiweke (born January 12, 1960, in St. Louis, Missouri) is an American sports executive who is part-owner and chief executive officer (CEO) of One Roof Sports & Entertainment, the ownership group of the Seattle Kraken.

== Career ==
In the early 1980s, Leiweke was vice president of the New York Arrows indoor soccer team.

In 1993, he was hired as team president of the Houston Rockets. In January 1994, he resigned to take a position with the Golden State Warriors. Despite his short tenure with Houston, the Rockets would later win the 1994 NBA Finals due in part to some of the moves he made earlier in that season.

Leiweke was the chief executive officer of the Seattle Seahawks of the National Football League, owned by Paul Allen, and the Seattle Sounders FC of Major League Soccer. Leiweke also was CEO of Vulcan Sports and Entertainment (VSE), a management company also owned by Allen which oversees Allen's sports-related properties. Prior to his employment with Allen, Leiweke had served as president of the Minnesota Wild, was the first executive director of The First Tee and previously held executive positions with the PGA Tour, the Vancouver Canucks, and the Golden State Warriors.

Leiweke joined the Seahawks in 2003. In 2005, the team advanced to Super Bowl XL, losing to the Pittsburgh Steelers.

In 2007, he became acting president of the Portland Trail Blazers, replacing Steve Patterson. Vulcan Sports and Entertainment was created at that time. Leiweke served as acting president until June 20 of that year, when the team named Larry Miller to be its president.

Leiweke was the key deciding factor in the firing of former Seahawks coach Jim L. Mora in January 2010, and was also the main advocate of the hiring of USC coach Pete Carroll.

Leiweke was hired on July 26, 2010, to become the CEO and minority owner of Tampa Bay Sports & Entertainment including the Tampa Bay Lightning, the Tampa Bay Storm, Tampa Bay Times Forum, and the combined Cascade and TBSE Real Estate Project. On July 24, 2015, it was announced that Leiweke would resign from his projects in Tampa Bay to join the NFL as their new chief operating officer. He became the first NFL COO since commissioner Roger Goodell took over in 2003. On March 13, 2018, Leiweke resigned as COO of the NFL.

The ownership group of the Seattle Kraken, Seattle's National Hockey League expansion team, announced on April 11, 2018, that Leiweke would become the president and CEO of the team. He is also a minority owner of the Kraken.

Leiweke is the CEO of One Roof Sports & Entertainment (owned by the Kraken) which was created by Samantha Holloway. After the original Seattle SuperSonics left for Oklahoma City in 2008, Leiweke's ultimate goal was to bring an NBA team back to Seattle to fill the void left by the Sonics.

== Personal life ==
Tod is the younger brother of Tim Leiweke, president and CEO of Oak View Group. He and his wife Tara became part-owners of the Seattle Sounders FC of Major League Soccer in 2020. They have two children, Tyler and Tori.

Business positions
First	One Roof Sports & Entertainment, CEO; 2026–present	Incumbent
Sporting positions
New creation	Seattle Kraken principal owner 2021–present Served alongside: Samantha Holloway and Jerry Bruckheimer	Incumbent
Preceded by Steve Patterson	Portland Trail Blazers President; 2007 (interim)	Succeeded by Larry Miller
Preceded by Steve Patterson	Portland Trail Blazers General Manager; 2007 (interim)	Succeeded by Kevin Pritchard
