= Larry Miller (sports executive) =

American business executive

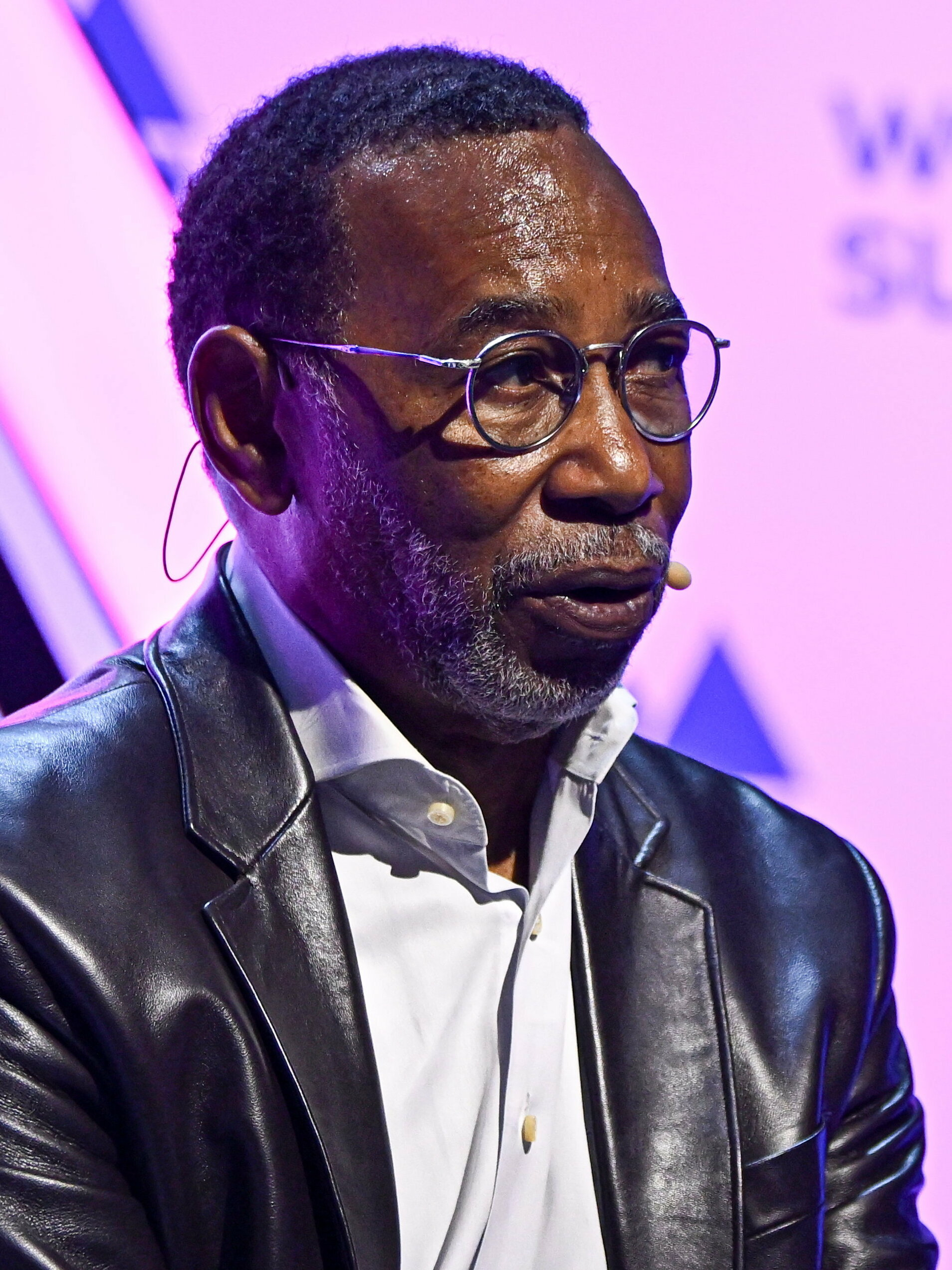
- Miller in 2023
- Born: Philadelphia, Pennsylvania, U.S.
- Occupation: Sports executive
- Known for: President of the Portland Trail Blazers

Larry G. Miller is an American business executive for Nike, Inc. He spent five years as the team president of the Portland Trail Blazers in the National Basketball Association (NBA). In his memoir, Jump: My Secret Journey From the Streets to the Boardroom, Miller writes that he was involved in a gang when he was 16, committing the murder of another teenager.

== Education ==
Miller earned a bachelor's degree in accounting from Temple University in 1982, and an MBA from La Salle University in 1985. He graduated from the Urban League Leadership Institute in 1987.

== Early career ==
Miller served as president, Executive Vice President and Controller for Jantzen, Inc. and was a Manager for Kraft Foods, Assistant Controller at Philadelphia Newspapers, Inc. and held various positions with Campbell's. In 1997, he was hired by Nike Inc., serving as vice president and general manager of Nike Basketball, where he was responsible for managing day-to-day operations of Jordan Brand, Nike Basketball and Converse. From 1999 to 2006, he served as the President of Jordan Brand.

== Trail Blazers ==
In 2007, Miller was hired as President of the Portland Trail Blazers, replacing interim president Tod Leiweke. Under Miller's management, the Trail Blazers have positioned themselves to make a respectable run at an NBA title. Portland has recorded three consecutive trips to the postseason while riding a streak of 159 consecutive sellouts dating back to December 21, 2007.

Also during his tenure, the Trail Blazers have made significant strides to becoming a leader in sustainability among professional sports franchises. The team's home arena, the Rose Garden, became the first existing arena in the world to attain LEED Gold Certification. The Trail Blazers are one of the six founding members of the Green Sports Alliance, which now boasts over 80 teams, leagues and venues. Portland hosted the inaugural Green Sports Summit in August, 2011. Larry Miller resigned on July 7, 2012, as President of the Portland Trail Blazers to return to his previous role as President of the Jordan Brand.

== Personal life ==
Miller lives in Portland, Oregon, and also serves on the board of directors for the 1803 Fund, Self Enhancement Inc. ("SEI"), the Oregon Business Council, Oregon Sports Authority, is a member of the Portland Mayor's Economic Development Cabinet, the NBA's Team Advisory Committee, and the NBA's Labor Relations Committee.

=== Murder of Edward White ===
In an October 2021 interview with Sports Illustrated Miller admitted to the September 1965 murder of Edward White. Miller was 16 years old and in a West Philadelphia gang called Cedar Avenue. A friend who he considered "an innocent" was stabbed to death in a gang fight in September 1965. Later that month, Miller and others went out looking for anyone affiliated with 53rd and Pine and shot the first person they encountered. That person was Edward White.

Miller pleaded guilty to second degree murder and served four and a half years in a prison for young offenders. He spent most of his teens and 20s in prison or juvenile detention facilities. While in prison, he studied for an accounting degree at Temple University.

Preceded by Tod Leiweke (interim)	Portland Trail Blazers President; 2007–2012	Succeeded by Chris McGowan
