= John Nash (basketball) =

American broadcaster and executive

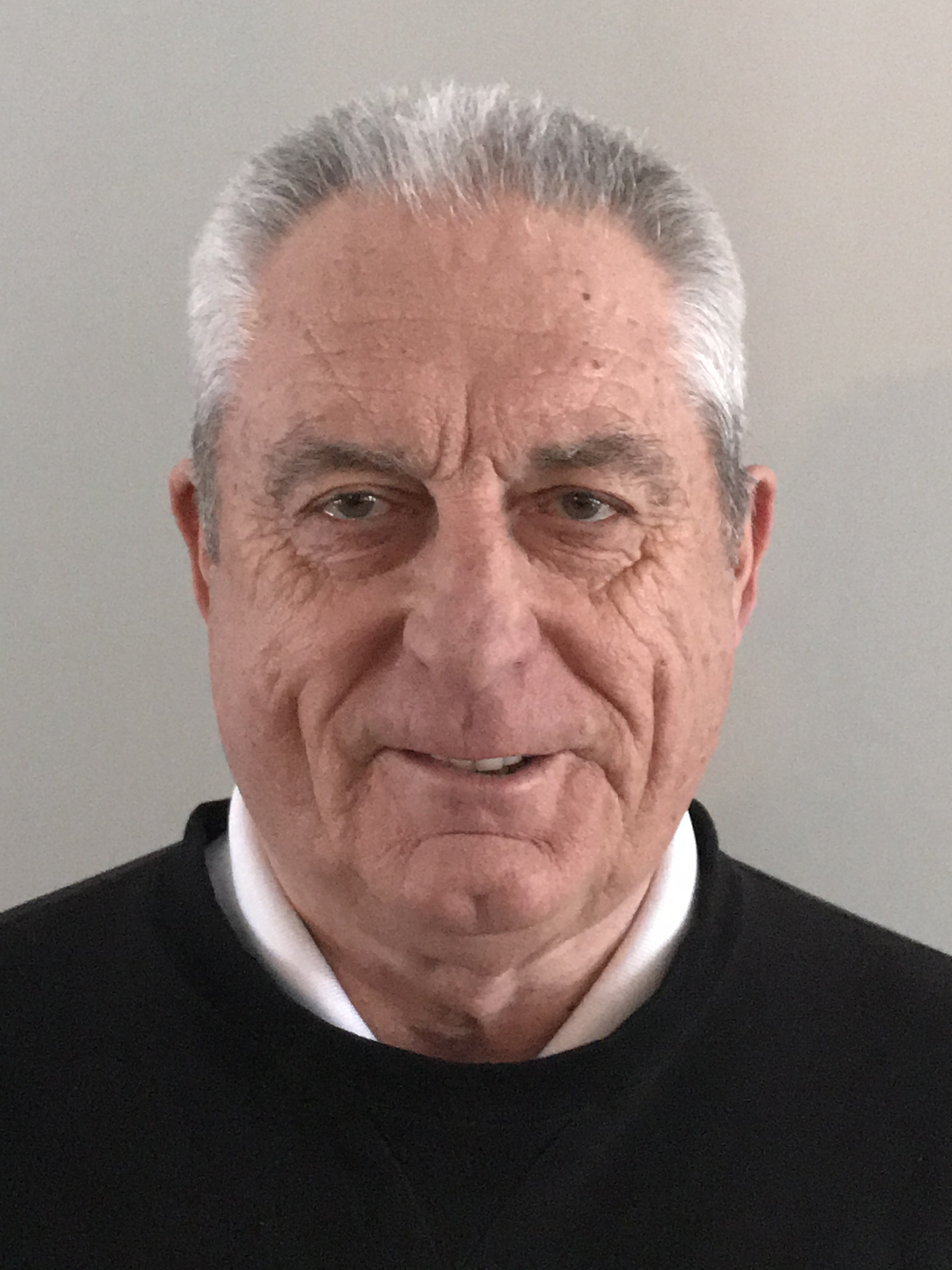

Career information
- High school: Monsignor Bonner (Drexel Hill, Pennsylvania)
- College: St. Joseph's
- Position: General manager

Career highlights
- As executive: NBA champion (1983)

John Nash is an American broadcaster and executive. He was an general manager for a number of franchises in the National Basketball Association (NBA). He also has worked as a broadcaster for Comcast, and in several other NBA front office jobs.

== Biography ==
Nash was educated at Monsignor Bonner High School in Drexel Hill, Pennsylvania, where he was later named as a member of its Hall of Fame. He decided early on that he would become a coach, and attended Saint Joseph's University, observing Jack Ramsay and Jack McKinney coach the Hawks. After graduation, he was a three-sport coach at the School of the Holy Child in Drexel Hill, and worked part-time as in ticket sales for the Philadelphia 76ers of the National Basketball Association (NBA), working under Ramsey and Pat Williams. In addition, he worked as assistant publicity manager for the Atlantic City Race Course and ticket manager of the Philadelphia Blazers of the World Hockey Association (WHA). From 1973 to 1975, he worked as the ticket manager for the Philadelphia Flyers of the National Hockey League (NHL), and is one of a very small list of people to have both an NHL and NBA championship ring. From 1976 to 1981, he worked for the Philadelphia Big 5 with future NBA coaches Chuck Daly, Paul Westhead, Jim Lynam and Don Casey as well as, Rollie Massimino who had NBA opportunities but remained a successful college coach. He was later inducted into the Big 5 Hall of Fame.

In 1981, Nash was named as the assistant general manager of the 76ers, and had a hand in selecting Charles Barkley in the 1984 NBA draft. He was promoted to general manager in 1986 following Williams' departure, but took the blame for a prearranged trade that saw Moses Malone and Terry Catledge traded to the Washington Bullets for Jeff Ruland and Cliff Robinson. He acquired the draft rights for Hersey Hawkins in the 1988 NBA draft, and later traded for Johnny Dawkins and Ron Anderson the following year. In 1990, he joined the Bullets as the general manager, and notably selected Tom Gugliotta, Calbert Cheaney, Juwan Howard and Rasheed Wallace in the NBA drafts from 1992 to 1995. He also traded for Chris Webber, Pervis Ellison, Don MacLean and Rex Chapman. In 1996, he joined the New Jersey Nets as the general manager, where he selected Kerry Kittles in the 1996 NBA draft, but shortly afterwards, he was replaced by head coach and director of basketball operations John Calipari. Following Calipari's firing in 1999, Nash was reinstated to the position, and in the 2000 NBA draft, he selected Kenyon Martin. He then served as general manager of the Portland Trail Blazers from 2003 to 2006. His contract with the Trail Blazers was not renewed after the conclusion of the 2005–06 NBA season. He then signed with the 76ers for the 2008–09 season as a pro personal scout.

Nash was inducted into the Delaware County Sports Hall of Fame as part of the class of 2008. He now owns the company Jayenne Associates, where he oversees the training, racing, and breeding of thoroughbred horses. He also serves on the board of directors for the Pennsylvania Thoroughbred Horsemen's Association.
