= List of NBA single-game 3-point scoring leaders =

This is a complete listing of National Basketball Association players who have recorded 11 or more 3-point field goals in a game. This feat has been accomplished by a player 46 times in NBA history, with Stephen Curry having recorded over a third of them with 16.

== Single-game leaders ==
Key
^		Active NBA player		
*		Inducted into the Naismith Memorial Basketball Hall of Fame|-		Occurred in playoff competition
		Player's team lost the game		
3PM	3-pointers made	3PA	3-pointers attempted	
Pts	Points	Min	Minutes played	

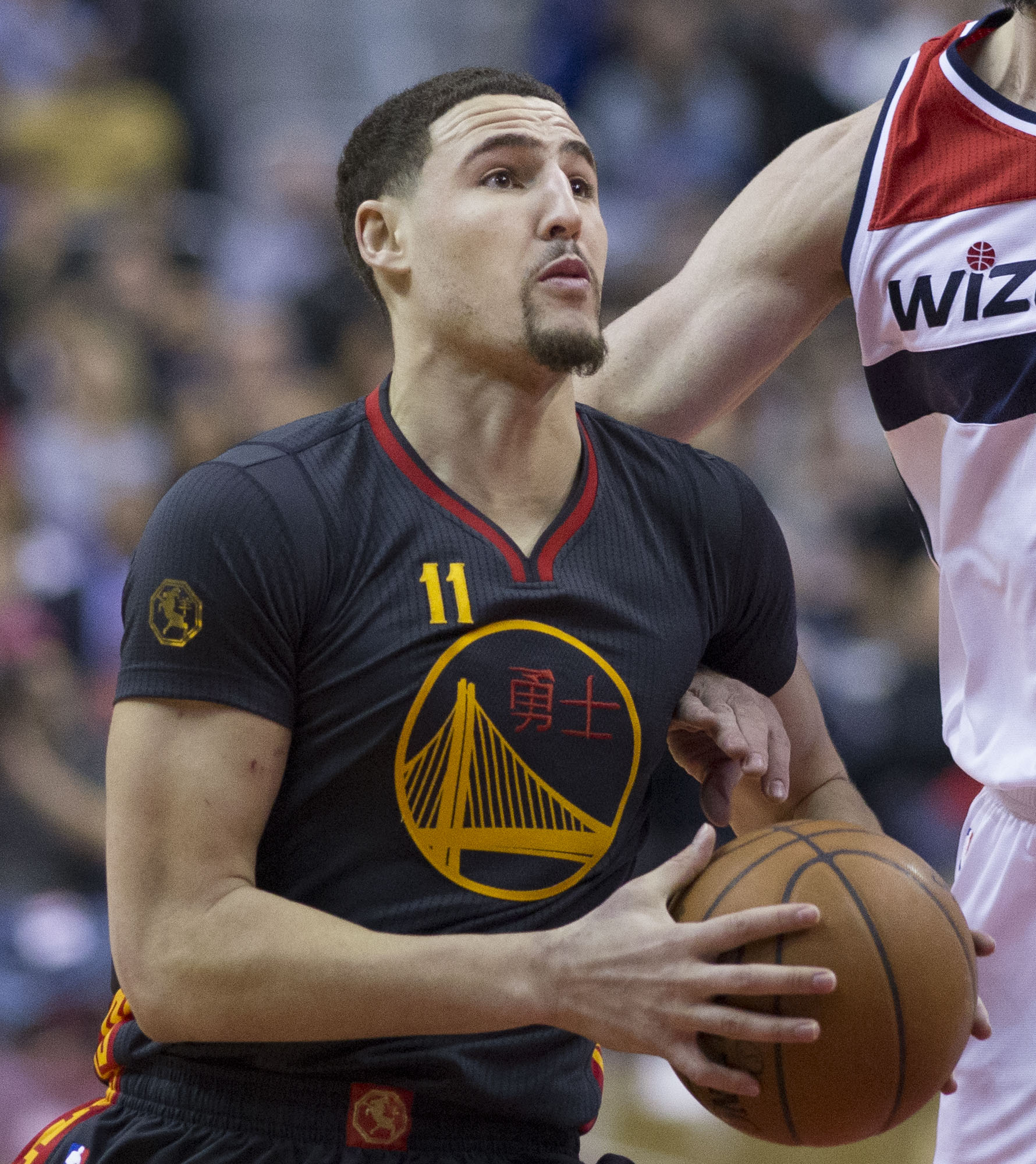
Klay Thompson holds the NBA record for most 3-pointers made in a single game with 14.

Single-game leaders
3PM	Player	Team	Score	Opponent	Date	3PA	Min	Pts	Notes	Ref.
14	Klay Thompson^	Golden State Warriors	149–124	Chicago Bulls	October 29, 2018	24	26:33	52	(Note: Thompson did not play in the fourth quarter.)	
13	Stephen Curry^	Golden State Warriors	116–106	New Orleans Pelicans	November 7, 2016	17	35:39	46		
13	Zach LaVine^	Chicago Bulls	116–115	Charlotte Hornets	November 23, 2019	17	34:44	49	(Note: LaVine hit three 3-pointers within the last 45 seconds of the game to survive an eight-point deficit within that timeframe.)	
13	Damian Lillard^	Portland Trail Blazers	131–114	Houston Rockets	February 26, 2023	22	39:11	71	(Note: Lillard set the Portland Trail Blazers franchise single-game scoring record.)	
12	Kobe Bryant*	Los Angeles Lakers	119–98	Seattle SuperSonics	January 7, 2003	18	37:11	45		
12	Donyell Marshall	Toronto Raptors	128–110	Philadelphia 76ers	March 13, 2005	19	28:41	38	(Note: Record for most 3PM off the bench.)	
12	Stephen Curry^ (2)	Golden State Warriors	121–118	Oklahoma City Thunder	February 27, 2016	16	37:41	46	(Note: The game went to overtime. Curry hit the game-winning 3-pointer from 32 feet with 0.6 seconds remaining.)	
12	Damian Lillard^ (2)	Portland Trail Blazers	147–140	Denver Nuggets	June 1, 2021	17	51:44	55	(Note: The game went to double overtime. Most 3PM in a playoff game. Lillard set the Portland Trail Blazers franchise playoffs single-game scoring record.)	
12	Klay Thompson^ (2)	Golden State Warriors	141–114	Oklahoma City Thunder	February 6, 2023	16	33:14	42		
12	Klay Thompson^ (3)	Golden State Warriors	116–101	Houston Rockets	February 24, 2023	17	35:32	42	(Note: Thompson became the first player to record two games of 12+ 3PM in the same season, accomplishing this feat 18 days apart.)	
12	Keegan Murray^	Sacramento Kings	125–104	Utah Jazz	December 16, 2023	15	36:06	47		
12	Stephen Curry^ (3)	Golden State Warriors	121–115	Orlando Magic	February 27, 2025	19	34:18	56	(Note: Curry hit a three-quarters court shot to close out the second half.)	
12	Stephen Curry^ (4)	Golden State Warriors	134–125	Memphis Grizzlies	April 1, 2025	20	36:31	52		
12	Stephen Curry^ (5)	Golden State Warriors	131–136	Portland Trail Blazers	December 14, 2025	19	35:26	48		
12	Trey Murphy III^	New Orleans Pelicans	137–141	Milwaukee Bucks	February 4, 2026	19	39:54	44		
11	Dennis Scott	Orlando Magic	119–104	Atlanta Hawks	April 18, 1996	17	39	35		
11	J. R. Smith	Denver Nuggets	118–98	Sacramento Kings	April 13, 2009	18	29:31	45	(Note: Smith came off the bench.)	
11	Stephen Curry^ (6)	Golden State Warriors	105–109	New York Knicks	February 27, 2013	13	48:00	54		
11	Deron Williams	Brooklyn Nets	95–78	Washington Wizards	March 8, 2013	16	37:52	42		
11	Klay Thompson^ (4)	Golden State Warriors	126–101	Sacramento Kings	January 23, 2015	15	32:49	52		
11	Kyrie Irving^	Cleveland Cavaliers	99–94	Portland Trail Blazers	January 28, 2015	19	38:35	55		
11	Stephen Curry^ (7)	Golden State Warriors	134–121	Washington Wizards	February 3, 2016	15	35:41	51		
11	Klay Thompson^ (5)	Golden State Warriors	108–101	Oklahoma City Thunder	May 28, 2016	18	39:35	41		
11	Stephen Curry^ (8)	Golden State Warriors	126–111	Charlotte Hornets	February 1, 2017	15	30:16	39	(Note: Curry did not play the fourth quarter.)	
11	Stephen Curry^ (9)	Golden State Warriors	144–122	Washington Wizards	October 24, 2018	16	31:35	51	(Note: Curry did not play the fourth quarter.)	
11	Stephen Curry^ (10)	Golden State Warriors	119–114	Dallas Mavericks	January 13, 2019	19	36:51	48		
11	Stephen Curry^ (11)	Golden State Warriors	130–131	Minnesota Timberwolves	March 29, 2019	19	41:55	37	(Note: The game went to overtime.)	
11	Buddy Hield^	Sacramento Kings	102–103	Boston Celtics	November 25, 2019	21	41:55	41		
11	Marcus Smart^	Boston Celtics	119–123	Phoenix Suns	January 18, 2020	22	33:21	37		
11	Damian Lillard^ (3)	Portland Trail Blazers	129–124	Golden State Warriors	January 20, 2020	20	45:08	61	(Note: The game went to overtime. Lillard set the Portland Trail Blazers franchise then single-game scoring record.)	
11	Damian Lillard^ (4)	Portland Trail Blazers	125–115	Denver Nuggets	August 6, 2020	18	40:44	45		
11	Fred VanVleet^	Toronto Raptors	123–108	Orlando Magic	February 2, 2021	14	37:06	54	(Note: VanVleet set the Toronto Raptors franchise single-game scoring record.)	
11	Stephen Curry^ (12)	Golden State Warriors	132–134	Dallas Mavericks	February 6, 2021	19	37:04	57		
11	Stephen Curry^ (13)	Golden State Warriors	147–109	Oklahoma City Thunder	April 14, 2021	16	29:23	42	(Note: Curry did not play the fourth quarter.)	
11	Stephen Curry^ (14)	Golden State Warriors	114–119	Boston Celtics	April 17, 2021	19	37:09	47		
11	Stephen Curry^ (15)	Golden State Warriors	136–97	Oklahoma City Thunder	May 8, 2021	21	29:20	49	(Note: Curry did not play the fourth quarter.)	
11	Bojan Bogdanović	Utah Jazz	116–103	Oklahoma City Thunder	March 6, 2022	18	33:33	35		
11	Malik Beasley	Minnesota Timberwolves	132–102	Oklahoma City Thunder	March 9, 2022	17	29:36	33	(Note: Beasley attempted only 3-point field goals the entire game.)	
11	Robert Covington	Los Angeles Clippers	153–119	Milwaukee Bucks	April 1, 2022	18	45:33	43		
11	Damian Lillard^ (5)	Portland Trail Blazers	133–112	Minnesota Timberwolves	December 12, 2022	17	29:22	38	(Note: Lillard did not play the fourth quarter.)	
11	CJ McCollum^	New Orleans Pelicans	127–116	Philadelphia 76ers	December 30, 2022	16	35:01	42		
11	Zach LaVine^ (2)	Chicago Bulls	126–112	Philadelphia 76ers	January 6, 2023	13	38:21	41		
11	Stephen Curry^ (16)	Golden State Warriors	131–109	Indiana Pacers	February 8, 2024	16	30:06	42		
11	Donte DiVincenzo^	New York Knicks	124–99	Detroit Pistons	March 25, 2024	20	40:50	40		
11	Julian Champagnie^	San Antonio Spurs	134–132	New York Knicks	December 31, 2025	17	36:10	36		
11	A. J. Green^	Milwaukee Bucks	125–108	Brooklyn Nets	April 10, 2026	16	41:00	35	(Note: Green set the Milwaukee Bucks franchise single-game record.)	

== See also ==
- NBA regular season records
- List of NBA career 3-point scoring leaders
