= List of NBA single-season 3-point scoring leaders =

NBA Statistics Page

This list exhibits the National Basketball Association's top single-season 3-point scoring averages based on at least 70 games played or 100 3-point field goals. The NBA did not adopt the 3-point field goal until 1979–80 NBA season.

== List ==
^	Active NBA player
*	Inducted into the Naismith Memorial Basketball Hall of Fame

Statistics accurate as of the 2025–26 NBA season.

Rank	Season	Player	Team	Games	3-point field goals	3PG	3P%
1	2020–21	Stephen Curry^	Golden State Warriors	63	337	5.35	.421
2	2018–19	Stephen Curry^ (2)	Golden State Warriors	69	354	5.13	.437
3	2015–16	Stephen Curry^ (3)	Golden State Warriors	79	402	5.09	.454
4	2018–19	James Harden^	Houston Rockets	78	378	4.85	.368
5	2023–24	Stephen Curry^ (4)	Golden State Warriors	74	357	4.82	.408
6	2021–22	Stephen Curry^ (5)	Golden State Warriors	64	285	4.45	.380
7	2024–25	Stephen Curry^ (6)	Golden State Warriors	70	311	4.44	.397
8	2025–26	Stephen Curry^ (7)	Golden State Warriors	43	190	4.42	.393
9	2019–20	James Harden^ (2)	Houston Rockets	68	299	4.40	.355
10	2022–23	Klay Thompson^	Golden State Warriors	69	301	4.36	.412
11	2022–23	Damian Lillard^	Portland Trail Blazers	58	244	4.21	.371
12	2020–21	Damian Lillard^ (2)	Portland Trail Blazers	67	275	4.10	.391
13	2016–17	Stephen Curry^ (8)	Golden State Warriors	79	324	4.10	.411
14	2019–20	Damian Lillard^ (3)	Portland Trail Blazers	66	270	4.09	.401
15	2023–24	Luka Dončić^	Dallas Mavericks	70	284	4.06	.382
16	2024–25	Anthony Edwards^	Minnesota Timberwolves	79	320	4.05	.395
17	2020–21	Buddy Hield^	Sacramento Kings	71	282	3.97	.391
18	2025–26	Luka Dončić^	Los Angeles Lakers	64	254	3.97	.366
19	2024–25	Malik Beasley	Detroit Pistons	82	319	3.89	.416
20	2018–19	Paul George^	Oklahoma City Thunder	77	292	3.79	.386
21	2025–26	LaMelo Ball^	Charlotte Hornets	72	272	3.78	.368
22	2019–20	Buddy Hield^ (2)	Sacramento Kings	72	271	3.76	.394
23	2021–22	Fred VanVleet^	Toronto Raptors	65	242	3.72	.377
24	2019–20	Dāvis Bertāns	Washington Wizards	54	200	3.70	.424
25	2019–20	Duncan Robinson^	Miami Heat	73	270	3.70	.446

== See also ==
- National Basketball Association
