= Klay Thompson =

American basketball player (born 1990)

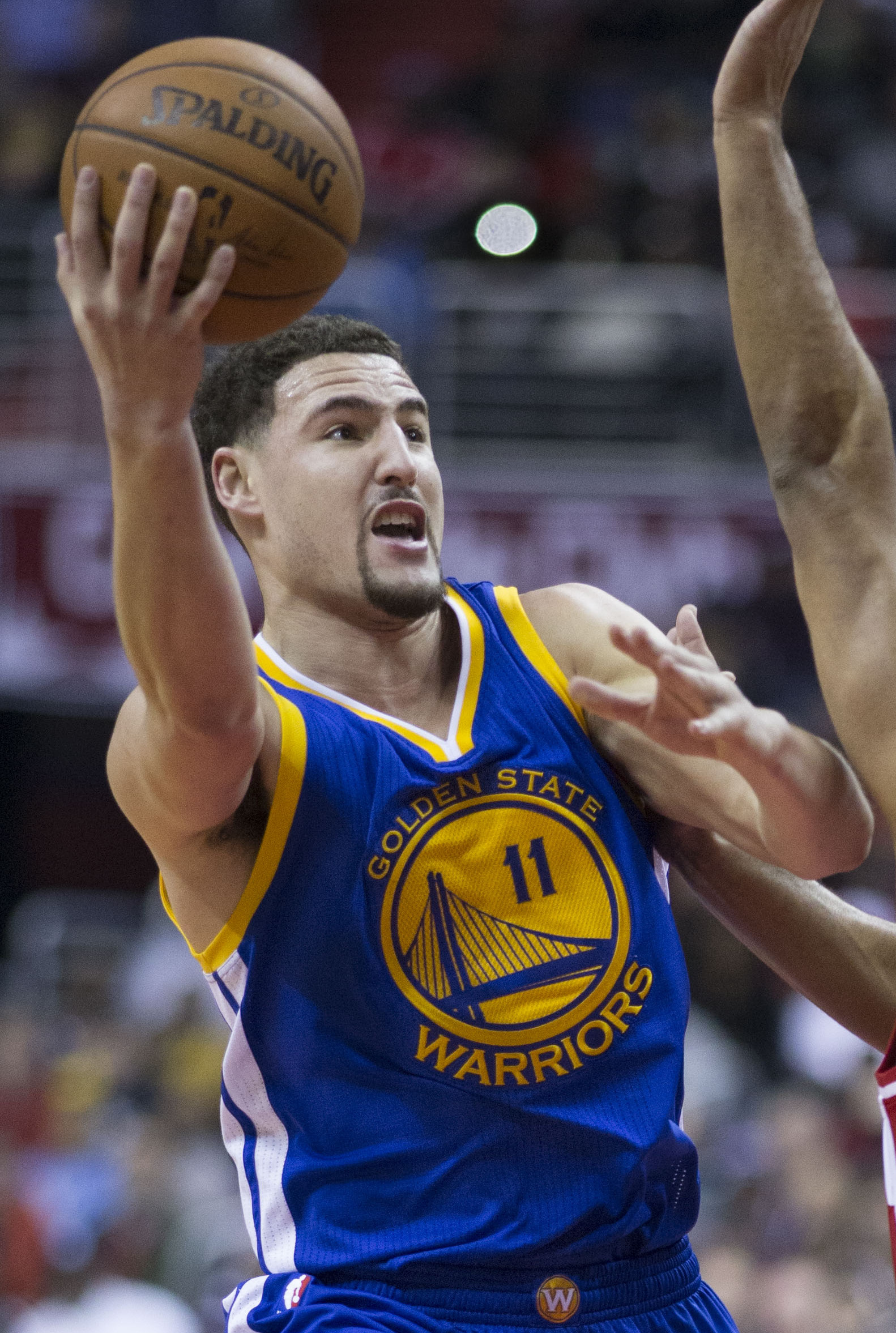
- Thompson with the Golden State Warriors in 2016

No. 11 – Miami Heat
- Position: Shooting guard
- League: NBA

Personal information
- Born: February 8, 1990 (age 36) Los Angeles, California, U.S.
- Listed height: 6 ft 5 in (1.96 m)
- Listed weight: 220 lb (100 kg)

Career information
- High school: Santa Margarita Catholic (Rancho Santa Margarita, California)
- College: Washington State (2008–2011)
- NBA draft: 2011: 1st round, 11th overall pick
- Drafted by: Golden State Warriors
- Playing career: 2011–present

Career history
- 2011–2024: Golden State Warriors
- 2024–2026: Dallas Mavericks
- 2026–present: Miami Heat

Career highlights
- 4× NBA champion (2015, 2017, 2018, 2022); 5× NBA All-Star (2015–2019); 2× All-NBA Third Team (2015, 2016); NBA All-Defensive Second Team (2019); NBA Three-Point Contest champion (2016); NBA All-Rookie First Team (2012); 2× First-team All-Pac-10 (2010, 2011); No. 1 retired by Washington State Cougars
- Stats at NBA.com
- Stats at Basketball Reference
Medals
Men's basketball
Representing the United States
Olympic Games
Gold medal – first place	2016 Rio de Janeiro	Team
World Cup
Gold medal – first place	2014 Spain	Team
U-19 World Championship
Gold medal – first place	2009 New Zealand	Team

Klay Alexander Thompson (born February 8, 1990) is an American professional basketball player for the Miami Heat of the National Basketball Association (NBA). He played his first 13 seasons with the Golden State Warriors, where he was one half of the "Splash Brothers", the other half being Stephen Curry. He is widely regarded as one of the best three-point shooters of all time. Thompson is a four-time NBA champion, a five-time NBA All-Star, a two-time All-NBA Third Team honoree, and was once named to the NBA All-Defensive Second Team. He has also won multiple gold medals with the United States national team on their 2014 World Cup team and 2016 Olympic team.

The son of former NBA player Mychal Thompson and brother of NBA player Mychel Thompson and Major League Baseball player Trayce Thompson, Klay Thompson played college basketball for three seasons with the Washington State Cougars, where he was a two-time first-team all-conference selection in the Pac-10 (now Pac-12). Thompson was selected in the first round of the 2011 NBA draft by Golden State with the 11th overall pick. In 2014, he and teammate Stephen Curry set a then-NBA record with 484 combined three-pointers in a season (a record they broke the following season with 525 and again in the 2015–16 season with 678), earning the pair the nickname of "the Splash Brothers." In 2015, Thompson helped lead the Warriors to their first NBA championship since 1975. The following season, he helped the Warriors win a record 73 games. The team advanced to the NBA Finals that season, losing to the Cleveland Cavaliers in seven games. Thompson and the Warriors avenged their 2016 finals loss, winning two more titles in 2017 and 2018. He also helped the Warriors reach their fifth straight Finals in 2019, where he suffered a torn ACL late in the series. After missing over two and a half years of play due to injury, Thompson returned in the middle of the 2021–22 season, where he won his fourth title in 2022.

== Early life ==
Thompson was born in Los Angeles to Julie and Mychal Thompson. His mother was a volleyball player in college for the University of Portland and University of San Francisco, while his father was the first overall pick of the 1978 NBA draft. When Thompson was two, he and his family moved to Lake Oswego, Oregon, where Thompson was childhood friends and Little League teammates with fellow future NBA star Kevin Love. Thompson and his brothers were raised there as devout Catholics and have Bahamian ancestry through their father.

When Thompson was 14, his family moved to Ladera Ranch, California, where he graduated from Santa Margarita Catholic High School in Rancho Santa Margarita in 2008. In his junior season, Thompson was named to the All-Area second team and to the Orange County third team. As a senior, Thompson averaged 21 points per game and led SMCHS to a 30–5 record and a Division III State Championship appearance. During the state championship, Thompson set a state finals record with seven three-pointers in a game. He was named Division III State player of the year, League MVP, first-team Best in the West, and an EA Sports Second Team All American.

College recruiting
Name	Hometown	School	Height	Weight	Commit date
Klay Thompson; SG	Rancho Santa Margarita, California	Santa Margarita Catholic High	6 ft 5 in (1.96 m)	185 lb (84 kg)	Oct 2, 2007
Klay Thompson; SG	Recruit ratings: Scout: Rivals: 247Sports: (95)				
Overall recruit ranking: Scout: 45 Rivals: 6 (SG); 51 (national)
Note: In many cases, Scout, Rivals, 247Sports, On3, and ESPN may conflict in their listings of height and weight.; In these cases, the average was taken. ESPN grades are on a 100-point scale.; Sources: "2008 Washington State Basketball Commitment List". Rivals. Archived from the original on February 21, 2017.; "2008 Washington State College Basketball Team Recruiting Prospects". Scout. Archived from the original on February 21, 2017.; "Washington State Cougars 2008 Player Commits". ESPN. Archived from the original on February 21, 2017.; "Scout.com Team Recruiting Rankings". Scout.; "2008 Team Ranking". Rivals.

== College career ==
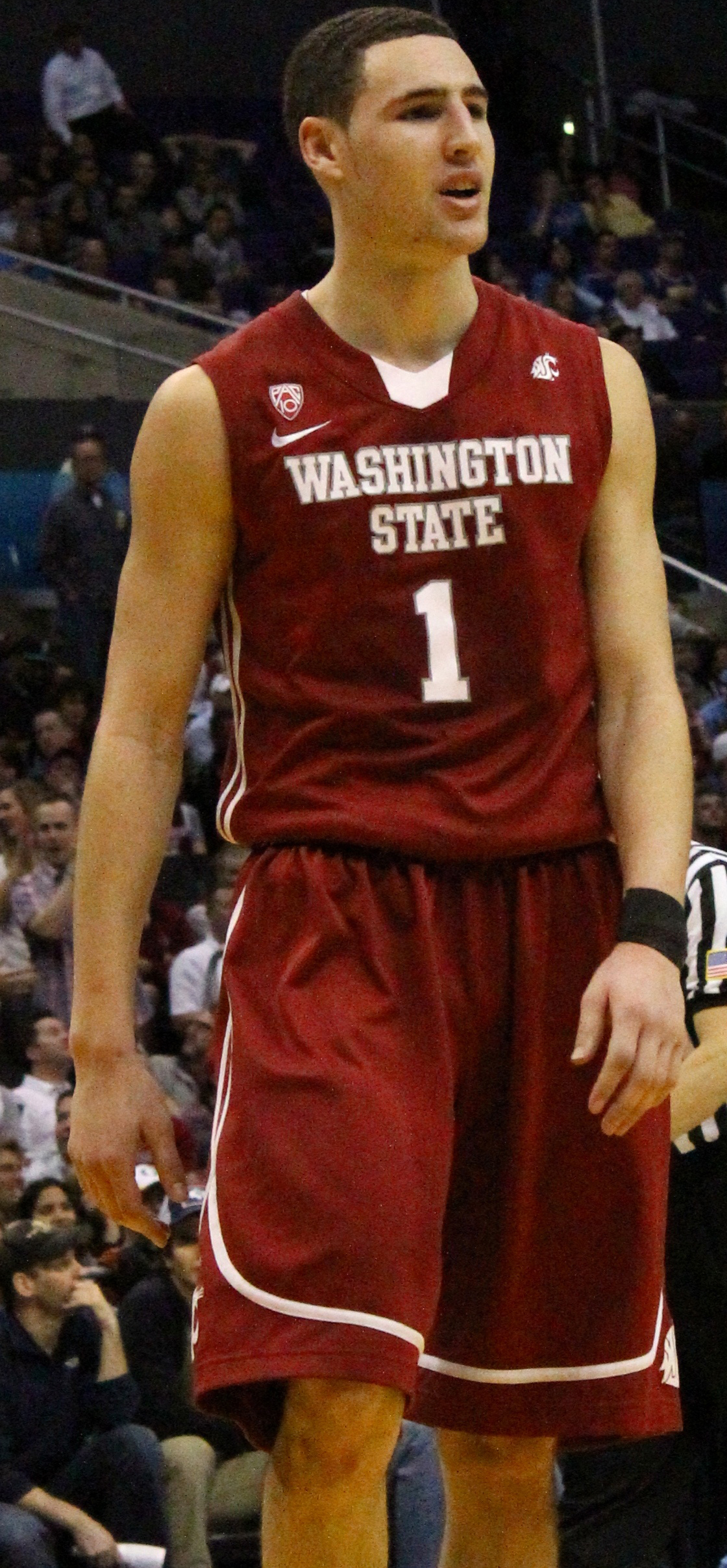
Thompson in 2011

Thompson started all 33 games as a freshman for Tony Bennett at Washington State University, leading his team in three-point field goal percentage and free throw percentage, and averaging 12.5 points per game. Thompson was named to the Pac-10 All-Freshman Team and Collegehoops.net All-Freshman Honorable Mention Team.

Thompson began his sophomore season by leading the Cougars to the Great Alaska Shootout Championship, being named its Most Outstanding Player after scoring a tournament single game record of 43 points in its championship. This was also the third highest single game point total in WSU history. After becoming the third fastest Cougar to reach 1,000 points, Thompson was named to the All-Pac-10 First Team. He earned Pac-10 Player of the Week honors twice during the season and was chosen as a midseason candidate for the John R. Wooden Award. Thompson finished the season averaging 19.6 points, good for second in the conference.

Thompson led the Pac-10 in scoring as a junior, again earning All-Pac-10 first team honors. He became just the third Cougar to win first-team all-district honors from the National Association of Basketball Coaches twice in his career. Thompson also became the first Cougar to be named Pac-10 Player of the Week three times when he won the award for the week of Nov. 22–28, extending the record to four after the week of December 6–12. Soon after, Thompson was named one of the 30 midseason candidates for the John R. Wooden Award. In the 2011 Pac-10 tournament, he set tournament records with 43 points and eight three-pointers. Thompson finished the season by setting WSU's single season scoring record with 733 points. He is WSU's third all-time leading scorer.

On January 18, 2020, Washington State retired the No. 1 that Thompson wore in college. He became the second WSU men's basketball player to receive this honor, joining Steve Puidokas, and the seventh WSU athlete in any sport whose number has been retired.

== Professional career ==
=== Golden State Warriors (2011–2024) ===
==== Early years (2011–2014) ====
Thompson declared for the 2011 NBA draft after his junior season, being selected 11th overall by the Golden State Warriors. Starting the season on the bench, Thompson would become a starter for the latter third of the season after the Warriors traded longtime starter Monta Ellisin March 2012. Warriors general manager Larry Riley praised Thompson for his shooting ability and expressed confidence that Thompson would improve his defensive skills with new coach Mark Jackson.

The NBA did not select Thompson for the 2012 NBA All-Star Weekend Rising Stars Challenge. However, in the four games after that decision, Thompson improved in all areas of basketball over his then-current season averages: points per game (12.5 over 7.6), shooting percentage (54.3% overall including 55.6% for three-pointers, up from 46.7 and 48.1), rebounds (2.8 from 1.6), assists (1.5 from 1.3), steals, and turnovers. The Warriors traded Ellis to the Milwaukee Bucks on March 13, 2012. The following game, Thompson scored a season-high 26 points in a loss to the Boston Celtics. A week later, he exceeded his previous high with 27 points in a win over the New Orleans Hornets. As of mid-February 2012, Thompson played around 17 minutes per game, but he played an average 30 minutes per game during the next month. At the end of the season, Thompson was voted to the NBA NBA All-Rookie First Team.

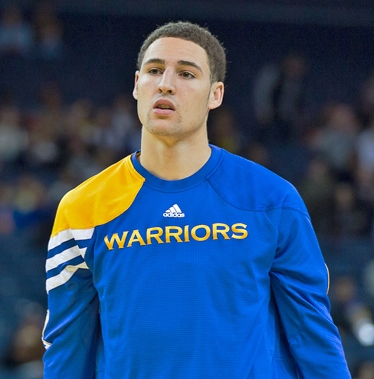
Thompson in 2012

On January 29, 2013, Thompson scored a season-high 32 points against the Cleveland Cavaliers. Warriors coach Mark Jackson said that Thompson and Stephen Curry formed the best shooting duo in NBA history. That season, they combined made 483 three-pointers, the most ever by an NBA duo at the time. (Note: Previous record was 435 by the Orlando Magic's Dennis Scott and Nick Anderson in 1995–96.) The Warriors defeated the Denver Nuggets in the first round of the playoffs, and were next matched up against the San Antonio Spurs. On May 8, 2013, Thompson recorded a playoff career-high 34 points against San Antonio, hitting 8-of-9 three-pointers, to go along with a career-high 14 rebounds. The Warriors lost to the Spurs in six games.

In the opening game for the Warriors, Thompson scored a season-high 38 points, including 5-of-7 three-pointers. He and Curry set an NBA record for 484 combined threes on the season, besting by one the record they set the previous year. Thompson averaged 18.4 points, 3.1 rebounds and 2.2 assists on the year. Thompson and the Warriors entered the 2014 NBA playoffs as the sixth seed in the Western Conference and were matched up with the Los Angeles Clippers in the first round; they lost the series in seven games.

==== First All-Star selection and NBA championship (2014–2015) ====
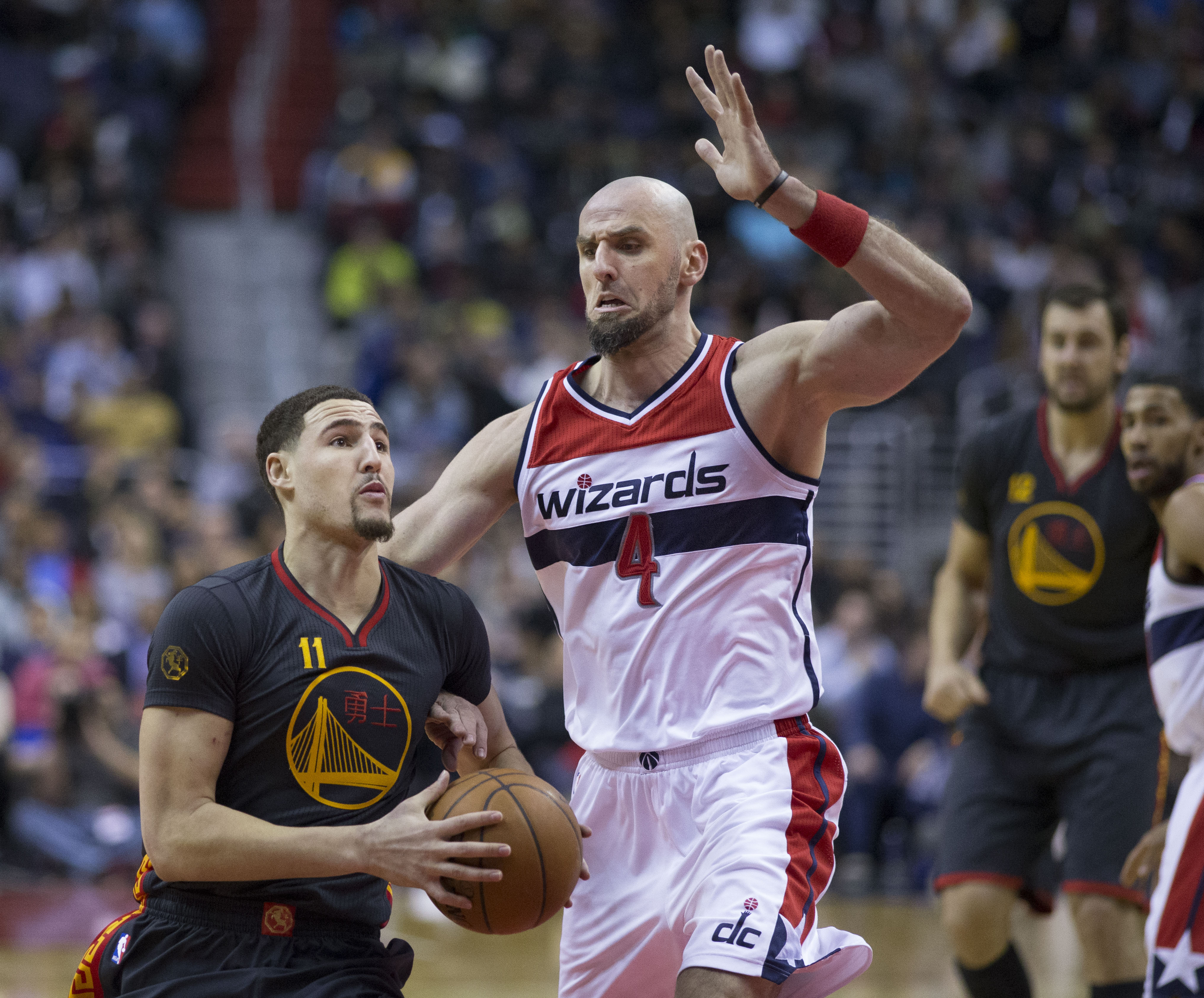
Thompson driving against Washington's Marcin Gortat in 2015

On October 31, 2014, Thompson signed a four-year, $70 million contract extension with the Warriors. The next day, he scored a then career-high 41 points in the Warriors' 127–104 victory over the Los Angeles Lakers. On January 23, 2015, Thompson scored a career-high 52 points, with 11 three-pointers, in a 126–101 victory over the Sacramento Kings. In the third quarter of that game, he scored an NBA-record 37 points for a single quarter, going 13-for-13 from the field, including nine three-pointers (also a league record for a single quarter). The 13 field goals tied David Thompson's (no relation) record for a quarter. (Note: The 37 points broke the previous record of 33 held by George Gervin and Carmelo Anthony. The nine three-pointers eclipsed the mark of eight by Michael Redd and Joe Johnson.) On January 29, 2015, Thompson was named a reserve for the 2015 Western Conference All-Star team for the first time in his career.

On March 8, 2015, Thompson hit three three-pointers against the Los Angeles Clippers to pass head coach Steve Kerr (726) on the NBA's all-time list. On March 17, he was ruled out for 7–10 days with a sprained ankle. That season, Curry broke his own record for three-pointers (286), and Thompson again finished second in the league (239) as the two combined to make 525 threes, surpassing their previous record by 41. On June 7, in Game 2 of the NBA Finals, Thompson scored a playoff career-high 34 points in a 95–93 overtime loss to the Cleveland Cavaliers. The Warriors went on to defeat the Cavaliers in six games to win the NBA championship and end the franchise's 40-year championship drought.

==== Finals upset (2015–2016) ====
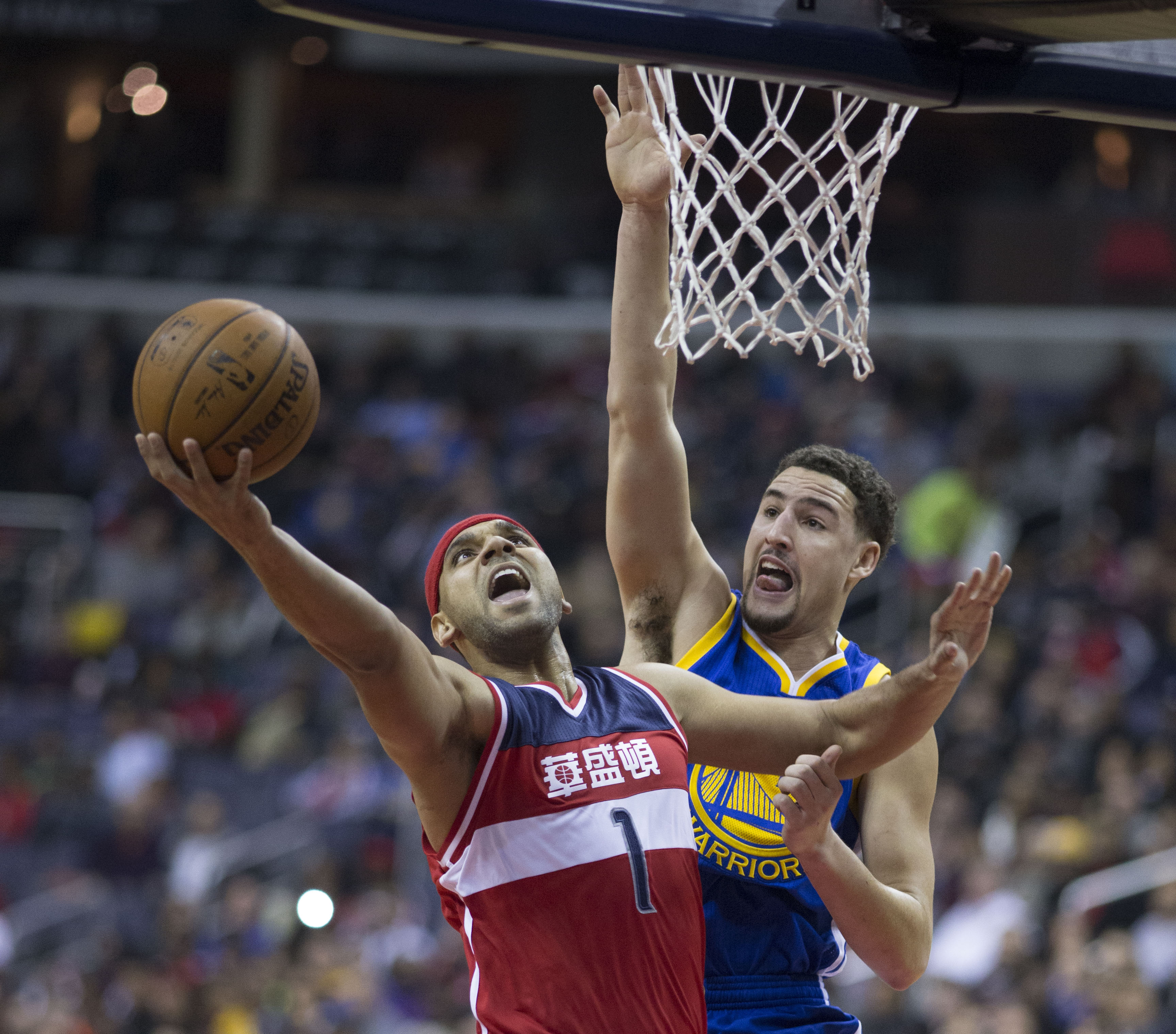
Thompson defending Jared Dudley from the Washington Wizards in 2016

Thompson opened the first seven games of the 2015–16 season shooting only 13-of-36 from 3-point range (36 percent). In the last 11 games of November, Thompson then shot a combined 32-of-73 from beyond the arc (43.8 percent). The Warriors' NBA-record start ended at 24 wins when they lost to the Milwaukee Bucks on December 12. In the Warriors' next game, on December 16, Thompson scored 27 of his then season-high 43 points in the third quarter of their 128–103 win over the Phoenix Suns. On January 8, he recorded his third consecutive game with 30 or more points, finishing with 36 points in a 128–108 win over the Portland Trail Blazers. On January 27, he scored a season-high 45 points on 14-of-20 shooting in a 127–107 win over the Dallas Mavericks. The following night, he was named a Western Conference All-Star reserve for the 2016 NBA All-Star Game, earning his second straight All-Star nod. On February 13, he competed in the All-Star Weekend's Three-Point Contest and won the event after defeating Curry and Devin Booker in the final round. On March 25, he scored 40 points against the Dallas Mavericks. Two days later, he had another 40-point game against the Philadelphia 76ers, scoring 40 points in consecutive games for the first time in his career. On April 7, Thompson scored 14 points against the San Antonio Spurs, helping the Warriors become the second team in NBA history to win 70 games in a season.

As the No. 1 seed in the Western Conference, the Warriors faced the eighth-seeded Houston Rockets in the first round of the playoffs. In Game 5 of the series, Thompson became the first player in NBA history to make at least seven three-pointers in consecutive playoff games, as he helped the Warriors advance through to the second round with a 4–1 victory, stepping up with Curry out injured. The Warriors went on to defeat the Portland Trail Blazers 4–1 in the second round, moving on to the Western Conference Finals where they faced the Oklahoma City Thunder. After being down 3–1 following a Game 4 loss, Thompson helped the Warriors rally in Games 5 and 6 to even the series at 3–3. In Game 6, Thompson made 11 three-pointers (Note: NBA record three-pointers in a playoff game at the time; Damian Lillard surpassed Thompson with twelve three-pointers on June 1, 2021, in a double overtime game.) and scored 41 points, as the Warriors forced a Game 7 with a 108–101 victory. With a Game 7 96–88 victory, the Warriors became the tenth team to rally from a 3–1 deficit and win a postseason series. The Warriors went on to lose to the Cleveland Cavaliers in the 2016 NBA Finals in seven games, despite being up 3–1 in the series.

==== Second NBA championship (2016–2017) ====
Thompson opened the first six games of the 2016–17 season shooting 11-of-53 from 3-point range (20.75 percent). In the last 11 games of November, he then went a combined 39-of-84 from three-point range (46.4 percent). On December 5, 2016, Thompson scored a career-high 60 points (shooting 21-of-33 and 8-of-14 on three-pointers) in 29 minutes over just three quarters in a 142–106 victory over the Indiana Pacers, becoming the first player in NBA history to score 60 points in less than 30 minutes of action. Thompson had an NBA season-high and career-best performance for the highest-scoring output by a Warriors player in more than 42 years. His 40 first-half points tied him for second-most scored in a half over the past decade. Thompson also became the first Warrior to score 60 points since Hall of Famer Rick Barry's 64 on March 26, 1974, joining Barry and Naismith honorees Wilt Chamberlain and Joe Fulks as the only Warriors players to do so. On January 26, he was named a Western Conference All-Star reserve for the 2017 NBA All-Star Game. He participated in the Three-Point Contest, but he failed to defend his title as he was eliminated in the first round. On April 4, 2017, he scored 41 points (his 10th career 40-point game) in a 121–107 victory over the Minnesota Timberwolves. The Warriors finished the season as the first seed in the West with a 67–15 record.

Thompson struggled with his shooting for extended stretches during the playoffs, but his defense against opposing guards like Damian Lillard, Patty Mills, and Kyrie Irving stood out. Following a 129–115 victory in Game 4 of the Western Conference Finals over the San Antonio Spurs, the Warriors reached their third straight NBA Finals series, becoming the first team in league history to start the playoffs 12–0. Thompson helped the Warriors win their second championship in three years with a 4–1 series win over the Cleveland Cavaliers in the 2017 NBA Finals. The Warriors finished the playoffs with a 16–1 record, the best postseason winning percentage in NBA history.

==== Third NBA championship (2017–2018) ====
On October 29, 2017, Thompson scored 29 points in a 115–107 loss to the Detroit Pistons, becoming the eleventh player in franchise history to eclipse 9,000 career points. On December 20, 2017, he scored 27 of his 29 points in the first half and made his first nine field goals in a 97–84 victory over the Memphis Grizzlies. On December 27, 2017, in a 126–101 win over the Utah Jazz, Thompson hit three three-pointers, moving him into a tie for third with Dana Barros at 89 consecutive games with a three-pointer. On January 17, 2018, he scored 38 points in a 119–112 victory over the Chicago Bulls. In a 134–127 victory over the Los Angeles Clippers on February 22, 2018, Thompson moved past Joe Barry Carroll's 9,996 points to earn tenth place on the franchise's career scoring list, also becoming the tenth Warrior to reach 10,000 regular season career points. Two days later, in a 112–80 victory over the Thunder, Thompson passed Neil Johnston (10,023) for ninth place on the franchise's career scoring list. On March 31, 2018, following an eight-game absence with a broken right thumb, Thompson scored 25 points on 10-for-19 shooting in a 112–96 victory over the Sacramento Kings. On April 5, 2018, in a 126–106 loss to the Indiana Pacers, Thompson was 4-of-9 on 3-pointers to move past Tim Hardaway (1,542) for 25th on the league's career list. Three days later, Thompson scored 22 of his 34 points in the first quarter of the Warriors' 117–100 win over the Phoenix Suns. He helped the Warriors defeat the San Antonio Spurs in the first round of the playoffs in five games, as he scored 24 points in a 99–91 victory in Game 5. As a result, Thompson joined Rick Barry (699) and Curry (652) as Warriors players with 600 postseason field goals. In Game 3 of the Western Conference Finals against the Houston Rockets, Thompson moved past Barry (1,776) for second place on the Warriors' career postseason scoring list. In Game 6, Thompson knocked down nine three-pointers on his way to 35 points, as the Warriors rallied from an early 17-point deficit to stave off elimination with a 115–86 victory over the Rockets. In Game 2 of the NBA Finals, Thompson played in his franchise-record 100th postseason game. He also became the sixth player ever to make 300 three-pointers in the postseason, joining Curry as Warriors to reach the feat. Thompson scored 20 points in the game to help the Warriors take a 2–0 lead with a 122–103 victory over the Cavaliers. The Warriors went on to sweep the series to claim back-to-back titles.

==== ACL tear in Finals (2018–2019) ====
Over the first seven games of the season, Thompson shot 5 for 36 from behind the arc and failed to have a 20-point game. He did not make multiple three-pointers in any of the contests, a career-worst seven-game drought for him. On October 29, 2018, against the Chicago Bulls, he hit an NBA-record 14 threes to break Curry's former mark of 13. Thompson scored 52 points in 27 minutes while making 14-for-24 of his threes and shooting 18-for-29 overall from the field. His 10 three-pointers in the first half tied Chandler Parsons' league record set in 2014, and Golden State made 17 threes in the first half to set the NBA record for a half. On November 24, Thompson scored 31 points with five three-pointers in a 117–116 win over the Sacramento Kings. Thompson moved into 21st place on the NBA's career three-pointers list when he hit his 1,609th in the first quarter, moving past Jason Richardson. On December 29, Thompson had his second-highest scoring game of the season with 32 points in a 115–105 victory over the Portland Trail Blazers. He shot his way out of a slump by hitting 12-of-21 from the field and 4-of-5 from 3-point range. On January 8, 2019, Thompson scored 43 points with seven 3-pointers in a 122–95 win over the New York Knicks. On January 21, he tied an NBA record by making his first 10 attempts from three-point range on his way to scoring 44 points in a 130–111 victory over the Los Angeles Lakers. Thompson finished 10-of-11 from beyond the arc and 17-of-20 from the floor overall. On March 8, he scored 39 points and made nine three-pointers in a 122–105 victory over the Denver Nuggets. On March 13, Thompson scored 30 points in a narrow 106–104 victory over the Houston Rockets. He made five 3-pointers to give him 203 for the season, joining Curry as the only players in NBA history to have seven straight seasons with 200 3-pointers. Praised for his defense throughout his career, Thompson was named to the NBA All-Defensive Team for the first time, earning second team honors. For Game 3 of the 2019 NBA Finals against the Toronto Raptors, Thompson missed his first career playoff game after straining his left hamstring late in Game 2. Thompson returned in Game 4 and scored 28 points with six three-pointers in a 105–92 loss as the Warriors went down 3–1 in the series. In Game 5, he helped the Warriors stave off elimination with 26 points in a narrow 106–105 victory, thus cutting the Raptors' series lead to 3–2. However, in Game 6, Thompson tore his ACL and left with 30 points with a few minutes left the third quarter, as the Warriors went on to lose the game and the series with a 114–110 loss. He finished the playoffs in third for career postseason three-pointers (374), trailing only Curry (470) and Ray Allen (385).

==== Dealing with injuries (2019–2022) ====
On July 1, 2019, Thompson agreed to stay with the Warriors on a five-year, $190 million maximum contract with an additional fifteen-percent trade kicker as a result of not making an All-NBA Team, which could have made him eligible for a supermax deal like Curry was in 2017. The next day, Thompson underwent successful knee surgery on his torn ACL, and missed the entire 2019–20 season as a result. Thompson officially re-signed with the Warriors on July 10. He returned to practice with the Warriors in September 2020. On November 19, it was announced that Thompson would miss the entire 2020–21 season due to an Achilles tendon injury, which he suffered in a pickup game in Los Angeles.

On November 28, 2021, Thompson was assigned to the Santa Cruz Warriors, Golden State's NBA G League affiliate, alongside James Wiseman for rehab purposes. Thompson was recalled on December 1. They were yet again assigned to Santa Cruz ten days later.

==== Comeback and fourth NBA championship (2022–2024) ====
On January 8, 2022, Thompson announced that he would make his return to the court on January 9 against the Cleveland Cavaliers. In his return, Thompson scored 17 points on 7-from-18 shooting in 20 minutes, as the Warriors won 96–82. On February 12, Thompson scored 16 of his then season-high 33 points in the fourth quarter against the Los Angeles Lakers in a narrow 117–115 comeback victory. On March 12, Thompson scored a then season-high 38 points along with six rebounds and five assists in a 122–109 victory over the reigning champion Milwaukee Bucks. In the final game of the regular-season, Thompson scored a season-high 41 points for the Warriors in a 128–107 victory over the New Orleans Pelicans to clinch the #3-seed in the Western Conference.

In Game 3 of the first round of the 2022 playoffs, Thompson scored 26 points in a 118–113 victory over the Denver Nuggets. He passed Hall of Fame guard Ray Allen for third on the NBA playoffs all-time three-pointers list. In Game 6 of the Western Conference Semifinals, Thompson posted 30 points, eight rebounds, and three blocks while shooting 8-of-14 from behind the three-point arc in a 110–96 closeout win over the #2-seed Memphis Grizzlies. In Game 5 of the Western Conference Finals, Thompson scored 32 points and had eight three-pointers in a closeout 120–110 victory over the Dallas Mavericks to advance to his sixth NBA Finals, where they faced the Boston Celtics.

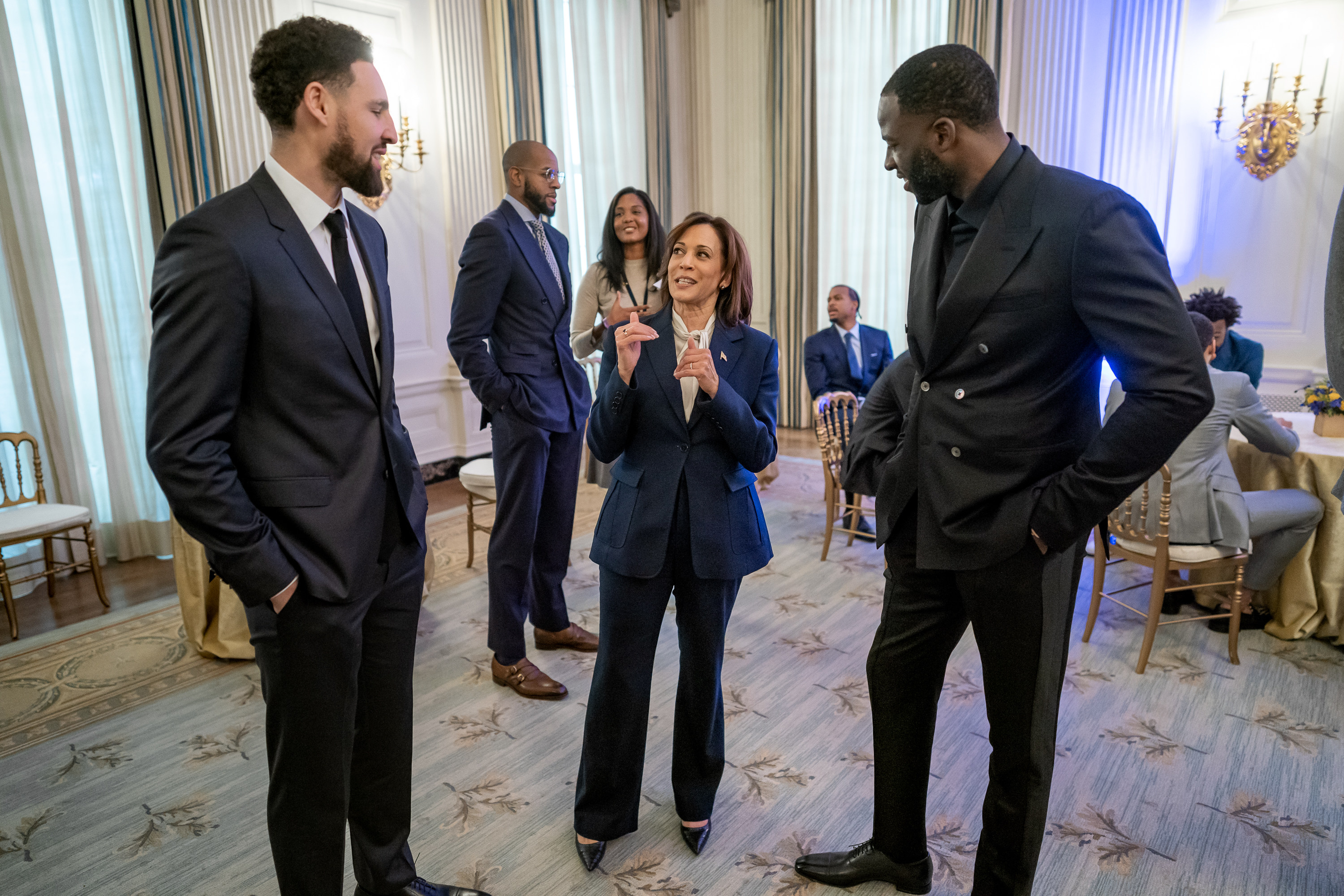
Thompson at the White House after winning his fourth NBA championship

In Game 1 of the Finals, Thompson passed LeBron James for second on the NBA playoffs all-time three-pointers list. In Game 5 of the Finals, Thompson joined teammate Stephen Curry and LeBron James as the only players in NBA history to make at least 100 three-pointers on the championship stage. He also passed LeBron James for second on the NBA Finals all-time three-pointers list. The Warriors won in six games, giving Thompson his fourth NBA Championship.

On November 20, Thompson scored a then season-high 41 points on 10-of-13 shooting from three-point range in a 127–120 victory over the Houston Rockets. Thompson, Stephen Curry, and Andrew Wiggins combined for 23 made three-pointers, the most three-pointers made in a game by a trio in NBA history. On December 10, in a rematch of the 2022 NBA Finals, Thompson scored a game-high 34 points in a 123–107 victory over the Boston Celtics. Three days later, he became the 13th player in NBA history with 2,000 career three-pointers made. On December 30, Thompson made a key three-pointer with 1:36 left in the game and scored 31 points in an 118–112 victory over the Portland Trail Blazers.

On January 2, 2023, Thompson scored a season-high 54 points and grabbed eight rebounds in a 143–141 double overtime victory over the Atlanta Hawks. On February 6, he scored 42 points with a season-high 12 three-pointers in a 141–114 victory over the Oklahoma City Thunder. On February 24, Thompson scored 42 points and tied his season-high with 12 three-pointers in a 116–101 victory over the Rockets. Thompson became the only player in NBA history to record multiple games with 12 or more three-pointers in a season. He also has the most games in NBA History with 12 or more threes (3), having surpassed teammate Stephen Curry who has done it twice in his career. In the final game of the regular season, Thompson made his 300th three-pointer in a 157–101 blowout victory over the Portland Trail Blazers. Thompson joined Stephen Curry and James Harden as the only players in NBA history to make at least 300 three-pointers in a season.

On October 29, 2023, Thompson put up 19 points on five three-pointers made in a 106–95 victory against the Houston Rockets and surpassed Jamal Crawford for tenth on the all-time career three-pointers list. On November 1, Thompson put up 14 points alongside a game-winning jumpshot in a narrow 102–101 victory over the Sacramento Kings. On November 14 against the Minnesota Timberwolves, Thompson was involved in an altercation on the court with Timberwolves forward Jaden McDaniels, beginning a team brawl between the two teams. Timberwolves center Rudy Gobert attempted to pull Thompson away from McDaniels when Draymond Green put Gobert into a chokehold. The brawl resulted in Thompson, Green and McDaniels all getting ejected. The next day, Thompson along with Green and McDaniels were fined $25,000 for the incident. On December 16, Thompson scored 24 points on four three-pointers made in a 124–120 victory over the Brooklyn Nets and surpassed Jason Terry for ninth on the all-time career three-pointers list. Three days later against the Boston Celtics, Thompson surpassed Vince Carter for eighth on the all-time career three-pointers list.

On February 15, 2024, Thompson came off the bench for the first time since March 11, 2012. He then proceeded to score a season-high 35 points while surpassing 15,000 points in his career. On April 2, in a 104–100 victory over the Dallas Mavericks, Thompson surpassed Kyle Korver for sixth on the all-time career three-pointers list. In the win-or-go-home play-in game against the Sacramento Kings, Thompson scored zero points and missed all 10 of his shots from the field in a 118–94 loss.

=== Dallas Mavericks (2024–2026) ===
After playing his first 13 years of his career with the Warriors, Thompson signed with the Dallas Mavericks on a three-year, $50 million contract via a six-team sign and trade on July 6, 2024, which also included the Philadelphia 76ers, Charlotte Hornets, Denver Nuggets and Minnesota Timberwolves. This became the NBA's first six-team transaction.

On October 24, Thompson made his Mavericks debut, putting up 22 points with six three-pointers made and seven rebounds in a 120–109 win over the San Antonio Spurs. His six three-pointers made set a Mavericks franchise record for the most three-pointers made in a debut game. On November 12, Thompson made his return to Chase Center as a visitor for the first time, being welcomed back with a tribute video before scoring 22 points behind six made three-pointers in a 120–117 loss to the Warriors. On December 25, in a game against the Minnesota Timberwolves, Thompson made his 2,561st career three-pointer, passing Reggie Miller for fifth on the NBA's all-time list. On March 29, 2025, in a game against the Chicago Bulls, Thompson recorded his 200th three-pointer of the season. He joined Stephen Curry as the only players in NBA history to record at least 10 seasons with at least 200 three-pointers made.

On January 15, 2026, Thompson scored a season-high 26 points and added six assists in a 144–122 win over the Utah Jazz. He passed Damian Lillard for fourth place on the NBA’s all-time 3-pointers made list. The very next game, on January 17, Thompson scored 23 points in a 138–120 win in a second consecutive game against the Jazz, surpassing 17,000 career points.

On August 21, 2026, Thompson agreed to a buyout with the Mavericks.

=== Miami Heat (2026–present) ===
On August 23, 2026, Thompson signed a two-year, $11.5 million contract with the Miami Heat. On October 21, he made his debut for the team, scoring 10 points in a 131–106 loss to the Minnesota Timberwolves. On November 4, he hit a game-winning three-pointer to finish with a season-high 30 points in a 117–116 win over the Los Angeles Clippers.

== National team career ==
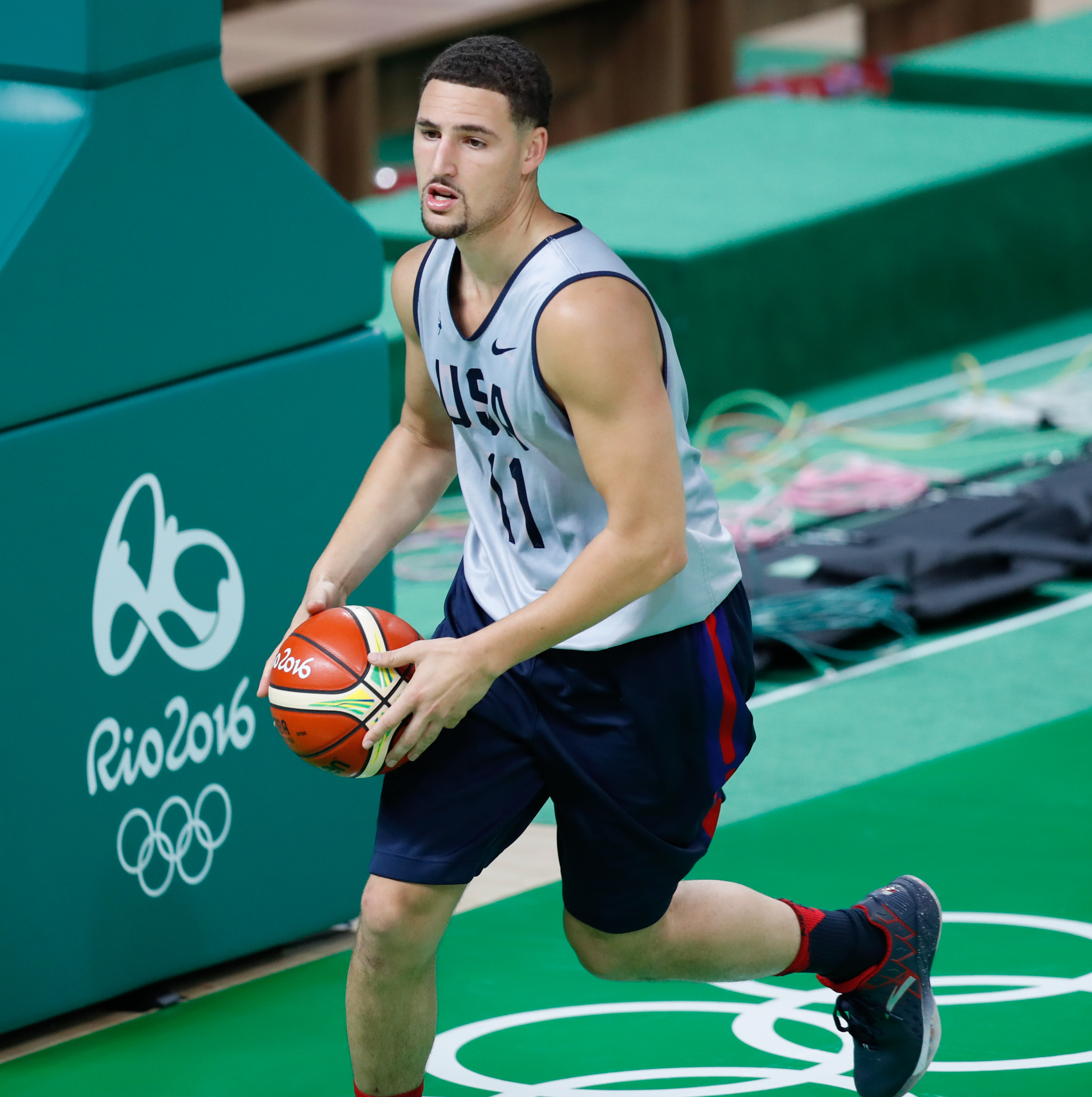
Thompson with the 2016 U.S. Olympic team

Thompson was a member of the United States national team, winning gold medals on their 2014 FIBA Basketball World Cup and 2016 Olympic teams. He also won gold on the Under-19 national team at the 2009 FIBA Under-19 World Championship.

== Player profile ==
Standing at 6 feet 5 inches (1.96 m) tall and weighing 220 pounds (100 kg), Thompson plays exclusively at the shooting guard position and has career averages of 18.6 points, 3.4 rebounds, and 2.2 assists per game. He is both a prolific and efficient shooter, particularly from range, as well as an elite free-throw shooter. Thompson's shooting form has been described as "textbook" and "picture-perfect". Though he was capable of handling the ball in the Warriors offense, Thompson is primarily a catch-and-shoot player, taking advantage of back-cuts and screens set by teammates to make space for his exceptionally accurate quick-release shot. Although Thompson is not known for blocking shots or creating steals, he is considered a strong defender thanks to his size at the guard position and ability to defend against both elite guards and wings. Thompson is also praised for his stamina.

Thompson is known for his quiet, laid-back personality, rarely showing emotion in or out of games. Thompson is one of the few players in the NBA sponsored by Chinese shoe company Anta, signing a 10-year deal with it in 2016. Thompson is regarded as a clutch scorer, particularly in Game 6's of playoff series, where his shooting splits rise up significantly compared to his usual playoff statistics, which earned Thompson the nickname "Game 6 Klay."

== Career statistics ==
Legend
GP	Games played	GS	Games started	MPG	Minutes per game
FG%	Field goal percentage	3P%	3-point field goal percentage	FT%	Free throw percentage
RPG	Rebounds per game	APG	Assists per game	SPG	Steals per game
BPG	Blocks per game	PPG	Points per game	**Bold**	Career high
†	Won an NBA championship	*	Led the league

=== NBA ===
==== Regular season ====
Year	Team	GP	GS	MPG	FG%	3P%	FT%	RPG	APG	SPG	BPG	PPG
2011–12	Golden State	66*	29	24.4	.443	.414	.868	2.4	2.0	.7	.3	12.5
2012–13	Golden State	**82***	**82***	**35.8**	.422	.401	.841	3.8	2.2	1.0	.5	16.6
2013–14	Golden State	81	81	35.4	.444	.417	.795	3.1	2.2	.9	.5	18.4
2014–15†	Golden State	77	77	31.9	.463	.439	.879	3.2	**2.9**	**1.1**	**.8**	21.7
2015–16	Golden State	80	80	33.3	.470	.425	.873	3.8	2.1	.8	.6	22.1
2016–17†	Golden State	78	78	34.0	.468	.414	.853	3.7	2.1	.8	.5	**22.3**
2017–18†	Golden State	73	73	34.3	**.488**	**.440**	.837	3.8	2.5	.8	.5	20.0
2018–19	Golden State	78	78	34.0	.467	.402	.816	3.8	2.4	**1.1**	.6	21.5
2021–22†	Golden State	32	32	29.4	.429	.385	.902	3.9	2.8	.5	.5	20.4
2022–23	Golden State	69	69	33.0	.436	.412	.879	**4.1**	2.4	.7	.4	21.9
2023–24	Golden State	77	63	29.7	.432	.387	**.927***	3.3	2.3	.6	.5	17.9
2024–25	Dallas	72	72	27.3	.412	.391	.905	3.4	2.0	.7	.4	14.0
2025–26	Dallas	69	8	21.7	.393	.383	.766	2.1	1.4	.5	.3	11.7
Career		934	822	31.4	.448	.409	.858	3.4	2.2	.8	.5	18.6
All-Star		5	1	20.4	.379	.379	1.000	5.0	3.4	.4	.0	12.6

==== Playoffs ====
Year	Team	GP	GS	MPG	FG%	3P%	FT%	RPG	APG	SPG	BPG	PPG
2013	Golden State	12	12	**41.3**	.437	.424	.833	**4.6**	1.8	1.0	.6	15.2
2014	Golden State	7	7	36.7	.408	.364	.792	3.4	**3.6**	1.0	.7	16.4
2015†	Golden State	21	21	36.2	.446	.390	.800	3.9	2.6	.8	**.9**	18.6
2016	Golden State	**24**	**24**	35.4	.444	.422	.854	3.7	2.3	1.1	.4	**24.3**
2017†	Golden State	17	17	35.0	.397	.387	.788	3.9	2.1	.8	.3	15.0
2018†	Golden State	21	21	37.8	**.465**	.427	.871	4.1	1.8	.8	.3	19.6
2019	Golden State	21	21	39.0	.456	**.443**	**.902**	4.1	2.1	**1.3**	.7	20.7
2022†	Golden State	22	22	36.0	.429	.385	.867	3.9	2.3	1.1	.7	19.0
2023	Golden State	13	13	36.0	.388	.368	.875	4.2	2.2	.5	.3	18.5
Career		158	158	36.9	.436	.405	.845	4.0	2.2	.9	.5	19.2

=== College ===
Year	Team	GP	GS	MPG	FG%	3P%	FT%	RPG	APG	SPG	BPG	PPG
2008–09	Washington State	33	**33**	33.1	.421	**.412**	**.903**	4.2	1.9	.9	.6	12.5
2009–10	Washington State	31	30	**35.4**	.412	.364	.801	5.1	2.3	1.4	.7	19.6
2010–11	Washington State	**34**	**33**	34.7	**.436**	.398	.838	**5.2**	**3.7**	**1.6**	**.9**	**21.6**
Career		98	96	34.4	.424	.390	.827	4.8	2.6	1.3	.7	17.9

== Accomplishments and awards ==
- 4× NBA champion: 2015, 2017, 2018, 2022
- 5× NBA All-Star: 2015, 2016, 2017, 2018, 2019
- 2× All-NBA Third Team: 2015, 2016
- NBA All-Defensive Second Team: 2019
- NBA Three-Point Contest champion: 2016
- NBA All-Rookie First Team: 2012
- NBA three-point field goals leader: 2023
- NBA free-throw percentage leader: 2024
- NBA regular season record for most points scored in a quarter (37)
- NBA regular season record for most three-pointers made in a game (14)
- NBA record for most three-pointers made in a single postseason (98, tied with Stephen Curry)

== Personal life ==
Thompson's older brother, Mychel, played basketball for Pepperdine University and had a brief stint in the NBA with the Cavaliers, while his younger brother, Trayce, became a Major League Baseball player. Thompson faced controversy when he was suspended for his final regular season game at WSU after being issued a misdemeanor criminal citation for marijuana possession. After winning the NBA Finals in 2015, Thompson and his father became the fourth father-son duo to win an NBA title, joining Matt Guokas Sr. and Jr., Rick and Brent Barry, and Bill and Luke Walton. (They were joined in 2022 by the newest father and son to win the title, Gary Payton and Gary Payton II, the latter of whom was Klay's teammate.)

Thompson is known for his offbeat, dry sense of humor. He previously owned an English bulldog named Rocco who died in May 2025.

In late October 2017, Thompson participated in local efforts to raise money for relief for the October 2017 Northern California wildfires, donating $1,000 for every point he scored in home games against the Washington Wizards, Toronto Raptors, and Detroit Pistons. With additional sponsor and fan matching, Thompson was able to increase that to $5,223 per point, ultimately raising $360,374 by tallying 69 points across the three games.

Thompson is an avid chess player, and has met with the former chess world champion, Magnus Carlsen.

Thompson was in a relationship with American actress Laura Harrier from 2018 to early 2020. In 2025, he confirmed that he was in a relationship with American rapper Megan Thee Stallion. In April 2026, she ended their relationship due to his alleged infidelity.

== Filmography ==
Film roles
Year	Title	Role	Notes
2021	Space Jam: A New Legacy	Himself, Voice of Wet-Fire	

== See also ==
- List of NBA career 3-point scoring leaders
- List of NBA career 3-point field goal percentage leaders
- List of NBA career playoff 3-point scoring leaders
- List of NBA single-season 3-point scoring leaders
- List of NBA single-game scoring leaders
- List of NBA annual three-point field goals leaders
- List of NBA annual free throw percentage leaders
- List of second-generation NBA players
