= Buddy Hield =

Bahamian basketball player (born 1992)

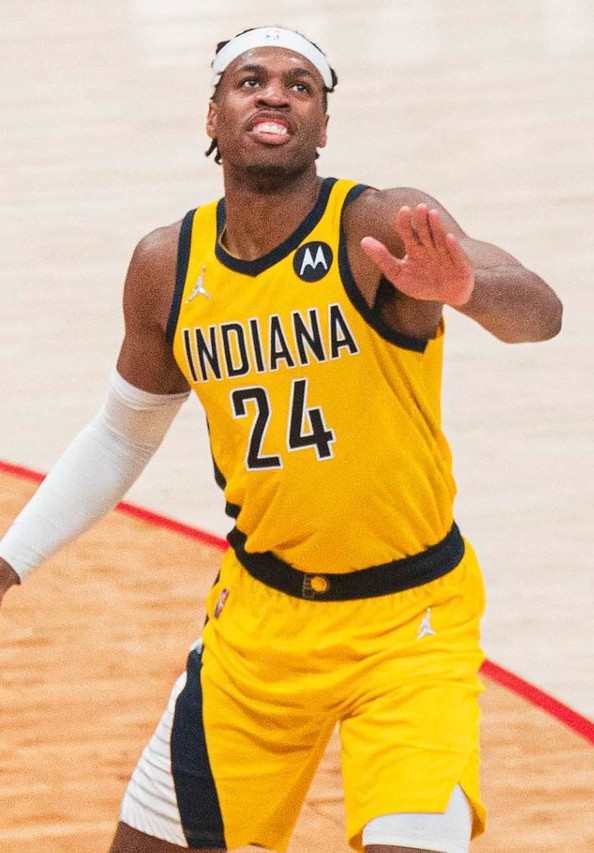
- Hield with the Pacers in 2022

No. 7 – Chicago Bulls
- Position: Shooting guard
- League: NBA

Personal information
- Born: December 17, 1992 (age 33) Freeport, The Bahamas
- Listed height: 6 ft 5 in (1.96 m)
- Listed weight: 220 lb (100 kg)

Career information
- High school: Jack Hayward (Freeport, The Bahamas); Sunrise Christian Academy (Bel Aire, Kansas)
- College: Oklahoma (2012–2016)
- NBA draft: 2016: 1st round, 6th overall pick
- Drafted by: New Orleans Pelicans
- Playing career: 2016–present

Career history
- 2016–2017: New Orleans Pelicans
- 2017–2022: Sacramento Kings
- 2022–2024: Indiana Pacers
- 2024: Philadelphia 76ers
- 2024–2026: Golden State Warriors
- 2026: Atlanta Hawks
- 2026–present: Chicago Bulls

Career highlights
- NBA All-Rookie First Team (2017); NBA Three-Point Contest champion (2020); National college player of the year (2016); Consensus first-team All-American (2016); Third-team All-American – AP, NABC (2015); Jerry West Award (2016); 2× Big 12 Player of the Year (2015, 2016); 2× First-team All-Big 12 (2015, 2016); Second-team All-Big 12 (2014); No. 24 honored by Oklahoma Sooners
- Stats at NBA.com
- Stats at Basketball Reference

Chavano Rainer "Buddy" Hield (/hiːld/ HEELD; born December 17, 1992) is a Bahamian professional basketball player for the Chicago Bulls of the National Basketball Association (NBA). He played college basketball for the Oklahoma Sooners and was named the Big 12 Conference Men's Basketball Player of the Year in 2015 and 2016.

In 2016, Hield received four major national player of the year awards: the John R. Wooden Award, the Naismith Award, Sporting News Player of the Year, and the Oscar Robertson Trophy. He was selected with the sixth overall pick in the 2016 NBA draft by the New Orleans Pelicans and was traded to the Sacramento Kings for DeMarcus Cousins in 2017. Hield was dealt to the Indiana Pacers in a package for Domantas Sabonis in 2022. In February 2024, he was traded to the Philadelphia 76ers. In July 2024, Hield was involved in a six-team trade that involved him getting traded to the Golden State Warriors. In February 2026, he was traded to the Atlanta Hawks.

== Early life ==
Hield grew up in Eight Mile Rock, a coastal region west of Freeport, in the West Grand Bahama district in the Bahamas. He was fifth of seven children of his mother Jackie Braynen. Hield received his nickname from his mother after Bud Bundy of the sitcom Married... with Children.

Hield attended Jack Hayward High School in Freeport. He was first featured in high school by The All Bahamian Brand, a basketball magazine from the Bahamas. Hield, as a young eighth-grader, was rated by the All-Bahamian Brand as the best eighth grader in the Bahamas and one to watch. Hield showed his early ability to lead his team from a young age by taking his Jack Hayward basketball team to the championship of the Providence Holiday Tournament on a buzzer-beater and also leading his team to win the Grand Bahamas High School Championships. For his exploits, Hield was named an All Bahamian Brand All Bahamian Selection.

After his performances in The Bahamas, Hield was recruited to attend Sunrise Christian Academy in Bel Aire, a basketball prep school in a suburb of Wichita, Kansas. Former Wichita State assistant and then-Sunrise coach Kyle Lindsted recruited the 6-foot 4-inch (1.93 m) guard. In 2011, during Hield's junior year at Sunrise Christian, he led the team to the National Association of Christian Athletes national championship, getting named the MVP of the tournament. As a senior in the 2011–12 season, Hield averaged 22.7 points on .491 shooting in 21.0 minutes per game.

Hield was highly recruited and selected the Oklahoma Sooners over the Kansas Jayhawks.

== College career ==
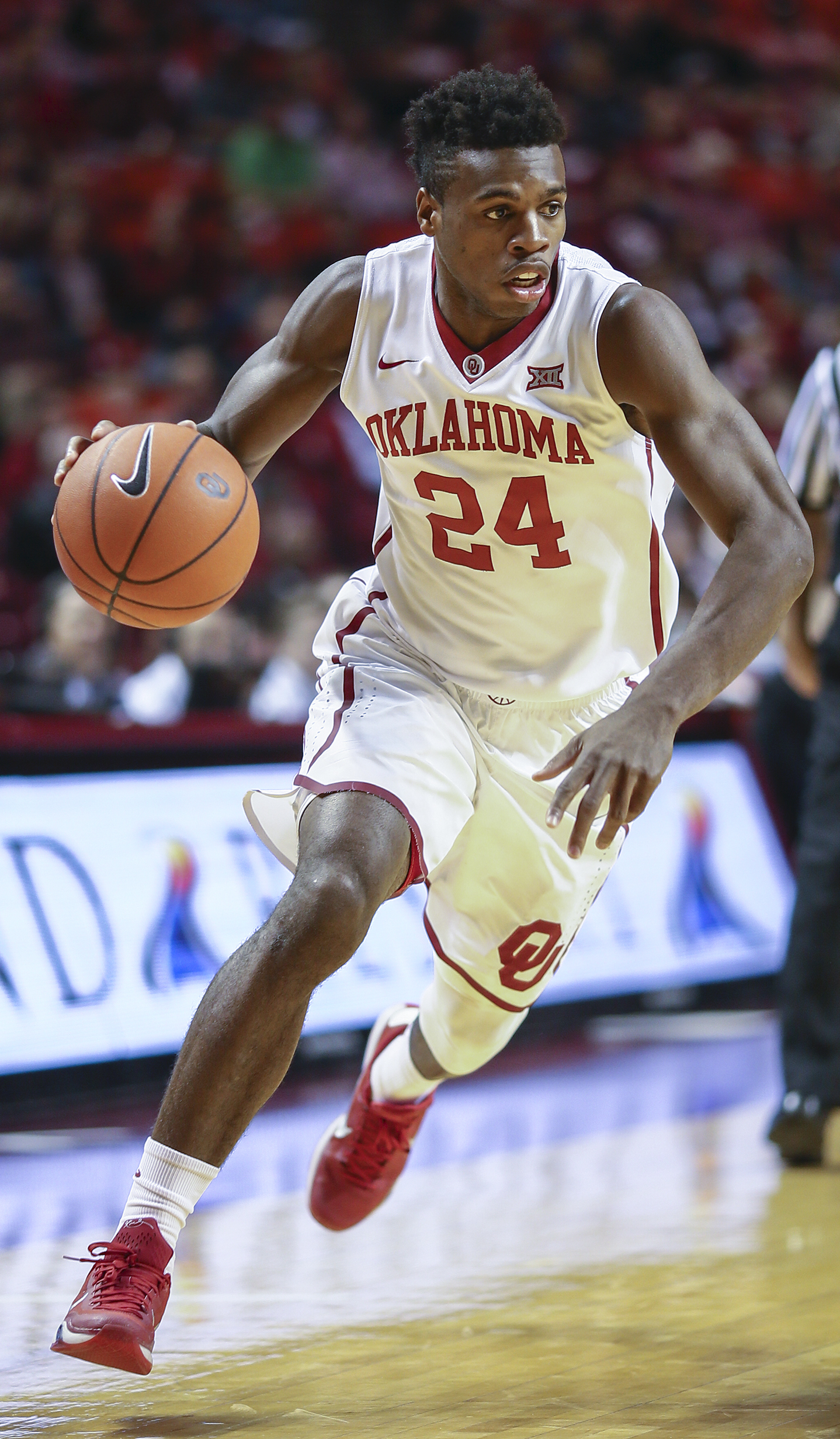
Hield in January 2016

As a freshman at Oklahoma, Hield scored 7.8 points per game and was the recipient of the team's Most Inspirational Award. He was a second-team All-Big 12 selection as a sophomore after averaging 16.5 points, 4.4 rebounds and 1.4 steals per game. Hield worked on his defense prior to his junior year and expanded his offensive game to more of a high-volume three-point shooter.

Hield averaged 17.4 points and 5.4 rebounds per game as a junior at Oklahoma and shot 41 percent from the field. He led Oklahoma to a 24–11 record and Sweet 16 berth. Despite being a potential 2015 NBA draft selection, Hield decided to return for his senior season. He was a first-team All-Big 12 selection and was named Big 12 Conference Men's Basketball Player of the Year.

Hield was listed on the Oscar Robertson Award preseason watchlist as well as the Naismith College Player of the Year preseason watchlist. He recorded a career-high of 46 points in a triple overtime loss to Kansas on January 4, 2016, receiving a standing ovation from the opposing crowd after a postgame interview with Scott Van Pelt. Hield's 46 points tied the record for most points scored by an opponent at Allen Fieldhouse. He was named to the 35-man midseason watchlist for the Naismith Trophy on February 11.

Following his senior year at Oklahoma, Hield won the John R. Wooden Award on April 7, 2016, as the best college basketball player for the 2015–16 season, averaging 25 points, 5.7 rebounds, two assists per game, and led the nation in three-point shots.

== Professional career ==
=== New Orleans Pelicans (2016–2017) ===
==== 2016–17 season: All–Rookie Honors & mid–season trade ====
On June 23, 2016, Hield was selected by the New Orleans Pelicans with the sixth overall pick in the 2016 NBA draft. On July 22, he signed with the Pelicans. On December 15, Hield had his best outing as a Pelican with 21 points and five three-pointers in a 102–95 victory over the Indiana Pacers. On January 3, 2017, Hield was named Western Conference Rookie of the Month for December.

=== Sacramento Kings (2017–2022) ===
On February 20, 2017, Hield was traded, along with Tyreke Evans, Langston Galloway and 2017 first-round and second-round draft picks, to the Sacramento Kings for DeMarcus Cousins and Omri Casspi. Hield made his Kings debut three days later, scoring 16 points off the bench in a 116–100 victory over the Denver Nuggets. He was named Western Conference Rookie of the Month for March. On April 11, Hield set a new career high with 30 points in a 129–104 victory over the Phoenix Suns. At the end of the season, he was named to the NBA All-Rookie First Team.

==== 2017–18 season: Career-high three–point percentage ====
Hield began the 2017–18 season as a starter before switching to a bench role and becoming the team's sixth man after seven games. On November 25, 2017, Hield scored a season-high 27 points off the bench with a career-high seven three-pointers in a narrow 97–95 loss to the Los Angeles Clippers. He shot 43.1 percent from three-point range in 2017–18, which placed him ninth in the NBA among qualified players.

==== 2018–19 season: Career-high points per game ====
In December 2018, Hield had a seven-game streak with 20 points or more. On January 5, 2019, he scored 32 points and had a career-high eight three-pointers in a 127–123 loss to the Warriors. On January 19, Hield made an off-balance, fadeaway three-pointer just before time expired and scored 35 points in a narrow 103–101 victory over the Detroit Pistons. On March 23, he had 25 points and broke the franchise season record for three-pointers in a 112–103 victory over the Suns. Hield made 7 of 14 shots from beyond the arc, giving him 245 three-pointers for the season and surpassing the mark of 240 set by Peja Stojaković in 2003–04. In April, he broke Damian Lillard's NBA record (599) for most three-pointers made in a player's first three seasons.

==== 2019–20 season: Contract extension ====
On October 21, 2019, Hield signed a four-year, $94 million contract extension. On December 26, he accused coaches and teammates of having "trust issues" after he was benched late in regulation of a game that the Kings eventually lost in double overtime to the Minnesota Timberwolves. Hield apologized to the whole team the next day for his remarks. Hield eventually lost his starting spot to Bogdan Bogdanović, but the switch produced a boost in his production and efficiency; in only his second game off the bench, on January 27, 2020, and again against the Timberwolves, Hield scored a career-high 42 points to lead the Kings to a 133–129 overtime victory. Afterwards, Hield dedicated the game to his idol Kobe Bryant, who died in a helicopter accident the day prior. On February 15, Hield won the Three-Point Contest at NBA All-Star Weekend in Chicago, topping Devin Booker 27–26 in the final round.

==== 2020–21 season: Fastest in NBA history to hit 1,000 3–pointers ====
On December 23, 2020, Hield recorded 22 points, four rebounds, and three assists, alongside a game-winning, buzzer-beating tip-in, in a 124–122 overtime win against the Denver Nuggets. On February 28, 2021, Hield became the fastest player in history to make 1,000 three-pointers, needing 350 games only to reach the mark, but that record has since been broken by Duncan Robinson.

On July 29, 2021, it was reported that the Kings were moving towards a deal sending Hield to the Los Angeles Lakers in exchange for forwards Kyle Kuzma and Montrezl Harrell. The deal fell through as the Lakers ended up trading Kuzma and Harrell in a package to the Washington Wizards for Russell Westbrook.

=== Indiana Pacers (2022–2024) ===
==== 2021–22 season: Mid–season trade ====
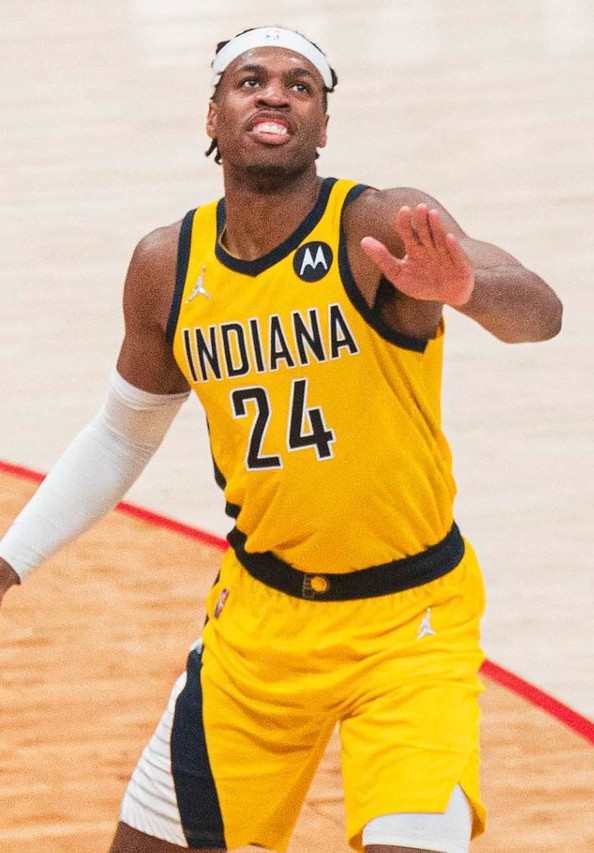
Hield with the Indiana Pacers in 2022

On February 8, 2022, Hield, Tyrese Haliburton, and Tristan Thompson were traded to the Indiana Pacers in exchange for Justin Holiday, Jeremy Lamb, Domantas Sabonis, and a 2023 second-round pick. Three days later, Hield made his Pacers debut, starting alongside Haliburton in a 120–113 loss to the Cleveland Cavaliers, recording a near triple double with 16 points, eight assists, and nine rebounds. On February 15, Hield scored a season-high 36 points on 8–12 three-point shooting, while dishing out four assists in a 128–119 loss to the Milwaukee Bucks.

==== 2022–23 season: Franchise record for most threes made in a season ====
On December 5, Hield became the second-fastest player in NBA history to reach 1,500 career three-pointers, only behind Stephen Curry. On December 27, Hield tied a then season-high 28 points on 6-of-7 three-point shooting, along with nine rebounds in a 129–114 victory over the Atlanta Hawks. Two days later, with a three-pointer against the Cleveland Cavaliers just three seconds into the game, Hield scored the fastest field goal recorded in NBA history since the 1996–97 NBA season, passing Hall of Fame Pacer Reggie Miller.

On January 11, 2023, Hield posted a new season-high 31 points, eight rebounds, and 7-of-15 three-point shooting in a loss to the New York Knicks. On February 15, he put up 27 points in a 117–113 victory over the Chicago Bulls. Hield also made his 230th three-pointer of the season, surpassing Reggie Miller for the most three-pointers made in a season in Pacers history. Hield and All–Star teammate Tyrese Haliburton were selected to participate in the 2023 NBA Three-Point Contest, where they both lost in the finals to Damian Lillard.

==== 2023–24 season: Assisting Pacers' ascension ====
Before the start of the 2023–24 season, Hield changed his jersey number for the first time in his career, switching from 24 to 7, formerly worn by Pacers Jermaine O'Neal, Al Jefferson, Malcolm Brogdon, and George Hill. In back-to-back games coming off the bench, Hield scored 19 points, once in a one-point loss to the Charlotte Hornets on November 4, and again in a 41-point victory against rookie Victor Wembanyama and the San Antonio Spurs on November 6, giving head coach Rick Carlisle his 900th career win.

=== Philadelphia 76ers (2024) ===
On February 8, 2024, Hield was traded to the Philadelphia 76ers in a three-team deal involving the San Antonio Spurs. The next day, he made his 76ers debut, putting up 20 points and six assists in a 127–121 loss to the Atlanta Hawks. Hield played in a league-high total of 84 games in the 2023–24 season, averaging 12.1 points, 3.2 rebounds, and 2.8 assists.

=== Golden State Warriors (2024–2026) ===
On July 6, 2024, Hield signed a four-year, $37.8 million contract with the Golden State Warriors via a six-team sign-and-trade also including the Minnesota Timberwolves, Dallas Mavericks, Denver Nuggets, and Charlotte Hornets, which became the NBA's first six-team transaction.

Hield made his Warriors debut on October 23, putting up 22 points with five three-pointers made and five rebounds in 15 minutes played off the bench in a 139–104 victory over the Portland Trail Blazers. Two days later, Hield put up 27 points with seven three-pointers made in a 127–86 victory over the Utah Jazz. He put up a total of 12 three-pointers made across his first two career games with the Warriors, the most three-pointers made by a player in his first two games with a team in NBA history. Hield played in all 82 games for Golden State during the 2024–25 NBA season, posting averages of 11.1 points, 3.2 rebounds, and 1.6 assists.

On May 4, 2025, Hield put up 33 points on nine three-pointers made in a 103–89 Game 7 win over the Houston Rockets to eliminate them in the first round. His nine three-pointers tied Donte DiVincenzo's record for the most made three-pointers in a playoff game 7. His six three-pointers made in the first half, were an NBA playoff game 7 first half record and tied the record for any half of a game 7 (also with DiVincenzo).

Hield made 44 appearances (including three starts) for Golden State during the 2025–26 NBA season, averaging 8.0 points, 2.5 rebounds, and 1.5 assists.

=== Atlanta Hawks (2026) ===
On February 5, 2026, Hield and Jonathan Kuminga were traded to the Atlanta Hawks in exchange for Kristaps Porziņģis.

=== Chicago Bulls (2026–present) ===
On September 22, 2026, Hield was traded to the Charlotte Hornets alongside Ryan Nembhard in exchange for Dorian Finney-Smith. Five days later, Hield was traded to the Chicago Bulls for Rob Dillingham and cash.

== Career statistics ==
=== NBA ===
Legend
GP	Games played	GS	Games started	MPG	Minutes per game
FG%	Field goal percentage	3P%	3-point field goal percentage	FT%	Free throw percentage
RPG	Rebounds per game	APG	Assists per game	SPG	Steals per game
BPG	Blocks per game	PPG	Points per game	**Bold**	Career high
*	Led the league

==== Regular season ====
Year	Team	GP	GS	MPG	FG%	3P%	FT%	RPG	APG	SPG	BPG	PPG
2016–17	New Orleans	57*	37	20.4	.393	.369	.879	2.9	1.4	.3	.1	8.6
2016–17	Sacramento	25*	18	29.1	.480	.428	.814	4.1	1.8	.8	.1	15.1
2017–18	Sacramento	80	13	25.3	.446	**.431**	.877	3.8	1.9	1.1	.3	13.5
2018–19	Sacramento	82*	**82***	31.9	.458	.427	.886	5.0	2.5	.7	.4	**20.7**
2019–20	Sacramento	72	44	30.8	.429	.394	.846	4.6	3.0	.9	.2	19.2
2020–21	Sacramento	71	71	**34.3**	.406	.391	.846	4.7	3.6	.9	.4	16.6
2021–22	Sacramento	55	6	28.6	.382	.368	.870	4.0	1.9	.9	.3	14.4
2021–22	Indiana	26	26	35.6	.447	.362	.886	**5.1**	**4.8**	.9	.4	18.2
2022–23	Indiana	80	73	31.0	.458	.425	.822	5.0	2.8	**1.2**	.3	16.8
2023–24	Indiana	**52***	28	25.7	.443	.384	.848	3.2	2.7	.8	**.6**	12.0
2023–24	Philadelphia	**32***	14	25.8	.426	.389	.923	3.2	3.0	.8	.3	12.2
2024–25	Golden State	82*	22	22.7	.417	.370	.828	3.2	1.6	.8	.3	11.1
2025–26	Golden State	44	3	17.5	.433	.344	.794	2.5	1.5	.8	.2	8.0
2025–26	Atlanta	7	0	7.3	**.481**	.412	**1.000**	1.1	.7	.3	.0	5.1
Career		765	439	27.4	.433	.395	.856	4.0	2.4	.9	.3	14.5

==== Playoffs ====
Year	Team	GP	GS	MPG	FG%	3P%	FT%	RPG	APG	SPG	BPG	PPG
2024	Philadelphia	4	0	12.7	.412	**.462**	**1.000**	1.3	.5	.0	.3	5.5
2025	Golden State	**12**	**9**	**27.3**	.416	.429	.929	**3.5**	**1.8**	**1.2**	**.4**	**12.5**
2026	Atlanta	2	0	6.5	**.800**	**1.000**	–	1.0	.0	.0	.0	5.0
Career		18	9	21.7	.429	.446	.938	2.7	1.3	.8	.3	10.1

=== College ===
Year	Team	GP	GS	MPG	FG%	3P%	FT%	RPG	APG	SPG	BPG	PPG
2012–13	Oklahoma	27	13	25.1	.388	.238	.833	4.2	1.9	1.2	.3	7.8
2013–14	Oklahoma	33	33	32.1	.445	.386	.750	4.4	1.9	**1.4**	.2	16.5
2014–15	Oklahoma	35	35	32.4	.412	.359	.823	5.4	1.9	1.3	.2	17.4
2015–16	Oklahoma	**37**	**37**	**35.4**	**.501**	**.457**	**.880**	**5.7**	**2.0**	1.1	**.5**	**25.0**
Career		132	118	31.7	.448	.390	.836	5.0	1.9	1.3	.3	17.4

== National team career ==
Hield traveled to the city of Tepic in Nayarit, Mexico from August 1–7, 2014, to represent the Bahamas national team in the 2014 Centrobasket, which is the regional basketball championship of FIBA Americas for the Central American and Caribbean subzone. Hield's coach in the tournament was Larry Eustachy. He averaged a tournament-leading 19.8 points per game and a team-high 6.0 rebounds.

== Personal life ==
Hield's first child, a daughter, was born in 2017.

In the days after Hurricane Dorian struck the Bahamas, Hield donated $105,000 to the Hurricane Dorian Relief fund and created a GoFundMe page to raise an extra $1,000,000 to help families devastated by the hurricane.

== See also ==
- List of NBA career 3-point scoring leaders
- List of NBA single-game 3-point field goal leaders
- List of NBA single-season 3-point scoring leaders
- List of NCAA Division I men's basketball season 3-point field goal leaders
