= List of NBA career 3-point scoring leaders =

This article provides two lists:

A list of NBA career regular season three-point field goals made. (Note: The National Basketball Association did not record 3-point field goals until the 1979–80 NBA season)

A progressive list of 3-point leaders showing how the record has increased through the years.

== List of 3-point scoring leaders ==
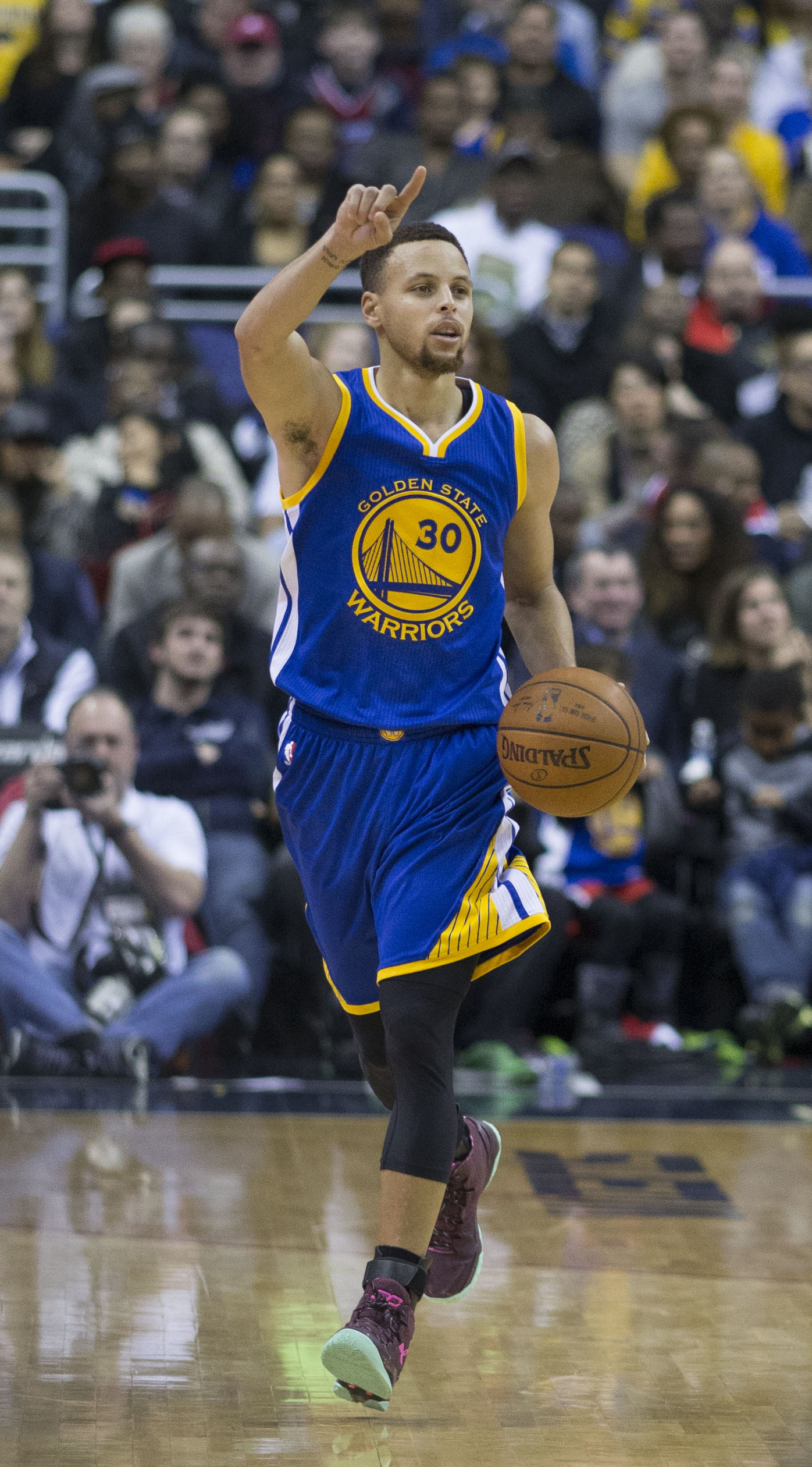
Stephen Curry has held the NBA career record for 3-point field goals since December 14, 2021.

Statistics accurate as of November 20, 2026.

^	Active NBA player
*	Inducted into the Naismith Memorial Basketball Hall of Fame
†	Not yet eligible for Hall of Fame consideration (Note: A player is not eligible for induction into the Naismith Memorial Basketball Hall of Fame until he has been fully retired for two calendar years.)
§	1st time eligible for Hall of Fame in 2027

Rank	Name	Position(s)	Team(s) played for (years) (Note: American Basketball Association (ABA) teams other than those admitted into the NBA in 1976 are not included; each year is linked to an article about that particular NBA season.)	Total 3-point field goals made	Total 3-point field goals attempted	3-point field goal percentage	3-point field goals made per game
1	Stephen Curry^	PG	Golden State Warriors (2009–present)	4,291	10,167	.422	3.98
2	James Harden^	SG/PG	Oklahoma City Thunder (2009–2012); Houston Rockets (2012–2021); Brooklyn Nets (2021–2022); Philadelphia 76ers (2022–2023); Los Angeles Clippers (2023–2026); Cleveland Cavaliers (2026–present)	3,436	9,438	.364	2.78
3	Ray Allen*	SG	Milwaukee Bucks (1996–2003); Seattle SuperSonics (2003–2007); Boston Celtics (2007–2012); Miami Heat (2012–2014)	2,973	7,429	.400	2.29
4	Klay Thompson^	SG	Golden State Warriors (2011–2024); Dallas Mavericks (2024–2026); Miami Heat (2026–present)	2,956	7,221	.409	3.12
5	Damian Lillard^	PG	Portland Trail Blazers (2012–2023, 2026–present); Milwaukee Bucks (2023–2025)	2,853	7,693	.371	3.12
6	LeBron James^	SF	Cleveland Cavaliers (2003–2010, 2014–2018); Miami Heat (2010–2014); Los Angeles Lakers (2018–2026); Philadelphia 76ers (2026–present)	2,646	7,610	.348	1.62
7	Reggie Miller*	SG	Indiana Pacers (1987–2005)	2,560	6,486	.395	1.84
8	Paul George^	SF	Indiana Pacers (2010–2017); Oklahoma City Thunder (2017–2019); Los Angeles Clippers (2019–2024); Philadelphia 76ers (2024–2026); Boston Celtics (2026–present)	2,493	6,486	.384	2.60
9	Kyle Korver	SG/SF	Philadelphia 76ers (2003–2007); Utah Jazz (2007–2010, 2018–2019); Chicago Bulls (2010–2012); Atlanta Hawks (2012–2017); Cleveland Cavaliers (2017–2018); Milwaukee Bucks (2019–2020)	2,450	5,715	.429	1.99
10	Kevin Durant^	SF/PF	Seattle SuperSonics/Oklahoma City Thunder (2007–2016); Golden State Warriors (2016–2019); Brooklyn Nets (2019–2023); Phoenix Suns (2023–2025); Houston Rockets (2025–present)	2,403	6,135	.392	1.97
11	Vince Carter*	SG/SF	Toronto Raptors (1998–2004); New Jersey Nets (2004–2009); Orlando Magic (2009–2010); Phoenix Suns (2010–2011); Dallas Mavericks (2011–2014); Memphis Grizzlies (2014–2017); Sacramento Kings (2017–2018); Atlanta Hawks (2018–2020)	2,290	6,168	.371	1.49
12	Jason Terry	SG/PG	Atlanta Hawks (1998–2004); Dallas Mavericks (2004–2012); Boston Celtics (2012–2013); Brooklyn Nets (2013–2014); Houston Rockets (2014–2016); Milwaukee Bucks (2016–2018)	2,282	6,010	.380	1.62
13	Buddy Hield^	SG	New Orleans Pelicans (2016–2017); Sacramento Kings (2017–2022); Indiana Pacers (2022–2024); Philadelphia 76ers (2024); Golden State Warriors (2024–2026); Atlanta Hawks (2026); Chicago Bulls (2026–present)	2,224	5,625	.395	2.86
14	Jamal Crawford	SG	Chicago Bulls (2000–2004); New York Knicks (2004–2008); Golden State Warriors (2008–2009); Atlanta Hawks (2009–2011); Portland Trail Blazers (2011–2012); Los Angeles Clippers (2012–2017); Minnesota Timberwolves (2017–2018); Phoenix Suns (2018–2019); Brooklyn Nets (2020)	2,221	6,379	.348	1.67
15	Kyle Lowry^{†}	PG	Memphis Grizzlies (2006–2009); Houston Rockets (2009–2012); Toronto Raptors (2012–2021); Miami Heat (2021–2024); Philadelphia 76ers (2024–2026)	2,209	6,022	.367	1.86
16	CJ McCollum^	SG/PG	Portland Trail Blazers (2013–2022); New Orleans Pelicans (2022–2025); Washington Wizards (2025–2026); Atlanta Hawks (2026–present)	2,205	5,592	.394	2.51
17	Paul Pierce*	SF	Boston Celtics (1998–2013); Brooklyn Nets (2013–2014); Washington Wizards (2014–2015); Los Angeles Clippers (2015–2017)	2,143	5,816	.368	1.60
18	Eric Gordon	SG	Los Angeles Clippers (2008–2011, 2023); New Orleans Hornets/Pelicans (2011–2016); Houston Rockets (2016–2023); Phoenix Suns (2023–2024); Philadelphia 76ers (2024–2026)	2,092	5,616	.373	2.25
19	Tim Hardaway Jr.^	SG/SF	New York Knicks (2013–2015, 2017–2019); Atlanta Hawks (2015–2017); Dallas Mavericks (2019–2024); Detroit Pistons (2024–2025); Denver Nuggets (2025–2026); Miami Heat (2026–present)	2,077	5,699	.364	2.30
20	Mike Conley^	PG	Memphis Grizzlies (2007–2019); Utah Jazz (2019–2023); Minnesota Timberwolves (2023–2026); Boston Celtics (2026–present)	1,990	5,137	.387	1.62
21	Jason Kidd*	PG	Dallas Mavericks (1994–1996, 2008–2012); Phoenix Suns (1996–2001); New Jersey Nets (2001–2008); New York Knicks (2012–2013)	1,988	5,701	.349	1.43
22	Dirk Nowitzki*	PF	Dallas Mavericks (1998–2019)	1,982	5,210	.380	1.30
23	Joe Johnson	SG/SF	Boston Celtics (2001–2002, 2021–2022); Phoenix Suns (2002-2005); Atlanta Hawks (2005–2012); Brooklyn Nets (2012–2016); Miami Heat (2016); Utah Jazz (2016–2018); Houston Rockets (2018)	1,978	5,331	.371	1.55
24	JJ Redick	SG	Orlando Magic (2006–2013); Milwaukee Bucks (2013); Los Angeles Clippers (2013–2017); Philadelphia 76ers (2017–2019); New Orleans Pelicans (2019–2021); Dallas Mavericks (2021)	1,950	4,704	.415	2.07
25	J. R. Smith	SG	New Orleans Hornets (2004–2006); Denver Nuggets (2006–2011); New York Knicks (2012–2015); Cleveland Cavaliers (2015–2019); Los Angeles Lakers (2020)	1,930	5,178	.373	1.98
26	Kyrie Irving^	PG	Cleveland Cavaliers (2011–2017); Boston Celtics (2017–2019); Brooklyn Nets (2019–2023); Dallas Mavericks (2023–present)	1,916	4,867	.394	2.42
27	Donovan Mitchell^	SG	Utah Jazz (2017–2022); Cleveland Cavaliers (2022–present)	1,885	5,153	.366	3.02
28	Chris Paul^{†}	PG	New Orleans Hornets (2005–2011); Los Angeles Clippers (2011–2017, 2025–2026); Houston Rockets (2017–2019); Oklahoma City Thunder (2019–2020); Phoenix Suns (2020–2023); Golden State Warriors (2023–2024); San Antonio Spurs (2024–2025)	1,870	5,059	.370	1.36
29	Wesley Matthews^{§}	SG	Utah Jazz (2009–2010); Portland Trail Blazers (2010–2015); Dallas Mavericks (2015–2019); New York Knicks (2019); Indiana Pacers (2019); Milwaukee Bucks (2019–2020, 2021–2023); Los Angeles Lakers (2021); Atlanta Hawks (2023–2024)	1,845	4,914	.375	1.87
30	Nicolas Batum^{†}	SF	Portland Trail Blazers (2008–2015); Charlotte Hornets (2015–2020); Los Angeles Clippers (2020–2023, 2024–2026); Philadelphia 76ers (2023–2024)	1,842	4,971	.371	1.53
31	Chauncey Billups*	PG	Boston Celtics (1997–1998); Toronto Raptors (1998); Denver Nuggets (19 99, 2008–2011); Minnesota Timberwolves (2000–2002); Detroit Pistons (2002–2008, 2013–2014); New York Knicks (2011); Los Angeles Clippers (2011–2013)	1,830	4,725	.387	1.75
32	Kobe Bryant*	SG	Los Angeles Lakers (1996–2016)	1,827	5,546	.330	1.36
33	Rashard Lewis	SF/PF	Seattle SuperSonics (1998–2007); Orlando Magic (2007–2010); Washington Wizards (2010–2012); Miami Heat (2012–2014)	1,787	4,625	.386	1.70
34	Peja Stojaković	SF	Sacramento Kings (1998–2006); Indiana Pacers (2006); New Orleans Hornets (2006–2010); Toronto Raptors (2010–2011); Dallas Mavericks (2011)	1,760	4,392	.401	2.19
35	Jrue Holiday^	PG	Philadelphia 76ers (2009–2013); New Orleans Pelicans (2013–2020); Milwaukee Bucks (2020–2023); Boston Celtics (2023–2025); Portland Trail Blazers (2025–present)	1,748	4,706	.371	1.58
36	Carmelo Anthony*	SF	Denver Nuggets (2003–2011); New York Knicks (2011–2017); Oklahoma City Thunder (2017–2018); Houston Rockets (2018–2019); Portland Trail Blazers (2019–2021); Los Angeles Lakers (2021–2022)	1,731	4,873	.355	1.37
37	Kevin Love^{†}	PF	Minnesota Timberwolves (2008–2014); Cleveland Cavaliers (2014–2023); Miami Heat (2023–2025); Utah Jazz (2025–2026)	1,727	4,684	.369	1.75
38	Bradley Beal^	SG	Washington Wizards (2012–2023); Phoenix Suns (2023–2025); Los Angeles Clippers (2025–present)	1,724	4,588	.376	2.14
39	Dale Ellis	SF/SG	Dallas Mavericks (1983–1986); Seattle SuperSonics (1986–1991, 1997–1999); Milwaukee Bucks (1991–1992, 1999–2000); San Antonio Spurs (1992–1994); Denver Nuggets (1994–1997); Charlotte Hornets (2000)	1,719	4,266	.403	1.42
40	Luka Dončić^	PG	Dallas Mavericks (2018–2025); Los Angeles Lakers (2025–present)	1,706	4,829	.353	3.22
41	Steve Nash*	PG	Phoenix Suns (1996–1998, 2004–2012); Dallas Mavericks (1998–2004); Los Angeles Lakers (2012–2015)	1,685	3,939	.428	1.38
42	Zach LaVine^	SG	Minnesota Timberwolves (2014–2017); Chicago Bulls (2017–2025); Sacramento Kings (2025–present)	1,670	4,274	.391	2.36
42	Kemba Walker	PG	Charlotte Bobcats/Hornets (2011–2019); Boston Celtics (2019–2021); New York Knicks (2021–2022); Dallas Mavericks (2022–2023)	1,670	4,642	.360	2.23
44	Jayson Tatum^	SF/PF	Boston Celtics (2017–present)	1,630	4,435	.368	2.65
45	Kentavious Caldwell-Pope^	SG	Detroit Pistons (2013–2017); Los Angeles Lakers (2017–2021); Washington Wizards (2021–2022); Denver Nuggets (2022–2024); Orlando Magic (2024–2025); Memphis Grizzlies (2025–2026); Philadelphia 76ers (2026–present)	1,610	4,406	.365	1.64
46	D'Angelo Russell^{†}	PG	Los Angeles Lakers (2015–2017, 2023–2024); Brooklyn Nets (2017–2019, 2025); Golden State Warriors (2019–2020); Minnesota Timberwolves (2020–2023); Dallas Mavericks (2025–2026); Washington Wizards (2026)	1,609	4,433	.363	2.46
47	Jason Richardson	SG	Golden State Warriors (2001–2007); Charlotte Bobcats (2007–2008); Phoenix Suns (2008–2010); Orlando Magic (2010–2012); Philadelphia 76ers (2012–2015)	1,608	4,344	.370	1.88
48	Trevor Ariza	SF	New York Knicks (2004–2006); Orlando Magic (2006–2007); Los Angeles Lakers (2007–2009, 2021–2022); Houston Rockets (2009–2010, 2014–2018); New Orleans Hornets (2010–2012); Washington Wizards (2012–2014, 2018–2019); Phoenix Suns (2018); Sacramento Kings (2019–2020); Portland Trail Blazers (2020); Miami Heat (2021)	1,605	4,579	.351	1.44
49	Harrison Barnes^	SF/PF	Golden State Warriors (2012–2016); Dallas Mavericks (2016–2019); Sacramento Kings (2019–2024); San Antonio Spurs (2024–present)	1,593	4,139	.385	1.47
50	Mike Miller	SF/SG	Orlando Magic (2000–2003); Memphis Grizzlies (2003–2008, 2013–2014); Minnesota Timberwolves (2008–2009); Washington Wizards (2009–2010); Miami Heat (2010–2013); Cleveland Cavaliers (2014–2015); Denver Nuggets (2015–2017)	1,590	3,910	.407	1.54

== Progressive list of 3-point scoring leaders ==
This is a progressive list of 3-point scoring leaders showing how the record has increased through the years.

^	Active NBA player
*	Inducted into the Naismith Memorial Basketball Hall of Fame

Statistics accurate as of November 20, 2026.

Team abbreviationsTeam(s) listed is the one player was on when he established the record.
BOS	Boston Celtics	HOU	Houston Rockets	NYK	New York Knicks	SDC	San Diego Clippers
CHA	Charlotte Hornets	IND	Indiana Pacers	ORL	Orlando Magic	SEA	Seattle SuperSonics
CHI	Chicago Bulls	LAL	Los Angeles Lakers	PHI	Philadelphia 76ers	TOR	Toronto Raptors
CLE	Cleveland Cavaliers	MIA	Miami Heat	PHX	Phoenix Suns	UTA	Utah Jazz
DEN	Denver Nuggets	MIL	Milwaukee Bucks	SAC	Sacramento Kings	WAS	Washington Wizards
GSW	Golden State Warriors	MIN	Minnesota Timberwolves	SAS	San Antonio Spurs	WSB	Washington Bullets

Progressive 3-point leaders
Season	Year-by-year leader	3P	Active player leader	3P	Career record	3P	Single-season record	3P	Season
1979–80	Brian TaylorSDC	90	Brian TaylorSDC	90	Brian TaylorSDC	90	Brian TaylorSDC	90	1979–80
1980–81	Mike BratzCLE	57	Brian TaylorSDC	134	Brian TaylorSDC	134	Brian TaylorSDC	90	1980–81
1981–82	Don BuseIND	73	Joe HassettGSW	193	Joe HassettGSW	193	Brian TaylorSDC	90	1981–82
1982–83	Mike DunleavySAS	67	Joe HassettGSW	194	Joe HassettGSW	194	Brian TaylorSDC	90	1982–83
1983–84	Darrell GriffithUTA	91	Darrell GriffithUTA	154	Joe HassettGSW	194	Darrell GriffithUTA	91	1983–84
1984–85	Darrell GriffithUTA	92	Darrell GriffithUTA	246	Darrell GriffithUTA	246	Darrell GriffithUTA	92	1984–85
1985–86	Larry Bird*BOS	82	Larry Bird*BOS	267	Larry Bird*BOS	267	Darrell GriffithUTA	92	1985–86
1986–87	Larry Bird*BOS	90	Larry Bird*BOS	357	Larry Bird*BOS	357	Darrell GriffithUTA	92	1986–87
1987–88	Danny AingeBOS	148	Larry Bird*BOS	455	Larry Bird*BOS	455	Danny AingeBOS	148	1987–88
1988–89	Michael AdamsDEN	166	Dale EllisSEA	472	Dale EllisSEA	472	Michael AdamsDEN	166	1988–89
1989–90	Michael AdamsDEN	158	Dale EllisSEA	568	Dale EllisSEA	568	Michael AdamsDEN	166	1989–90
1990–91	Vernon MaxwellHOU	172	Michael Adams; DEN 1990–91; WSB 1991–92	658	Michael Adams; DEN 1990–91; WSB 1991–92	658	Vernon MaxwellHOU	172	1990–91
1991–92	Vernon MaxwellHOU	162	Michael Adams; DEN 1990–91; WSB 1991–92	783	Michael Adams; DEN 1990–91; WSB 1991–92	783	Vernon MaxwellHOU	172	1991–92
1992–93	Dan MajerlePHX Reggie Miller*IND	167	Dale Ellis; SAS 1992–94; DEN 1994–97	882	Dale Ellis; SAS 1992–94; DEN 1994–97	882	Vernon MaxwellHOU	172	1992–93
1993–94	Dan MajerlePHX	192	Dale Ellis; SAS 1992–94; DEN 1994–97	1,013	Dale Ellis; SAS 1992–94; DEN 1994–97	1,013	Dan MajerlePHX	192	1993–94
1994–95	John StarksNYK	217	Dale Ellis; SAS 1992–94; DEN 1994–97	1,119	Dale Ellis; SAS 1992–94; DEN 1994–97	1,119	John StarksNYK	217	1994–95
1995–96	Dennis ScottORL	267	Dale Ellis; SAS 1992–94; DEN 1994–97	1,269	Dale Ellis; SAS 1992–94; DEN 1994–97	1,269	Dennis ScottORL	267	1995–96
1996–97	Reggie Miller*IND	229	Dale Ellis; SAS 1992–94; DEN 1994–97	1,461	Dale Ellis; SAS 1992–94; DEN 1994–97	1,461	Dennis ScottORL	267	1996–97
1997–98	Wesley PersonCLE	192	Reggie Miller*IND	1,596	Reggie Miller*IND	1,596	Dennis ScottORL	267	1997–98
1998–99	Dee BrownTOR	135	Reggie Miller*IND	1,702	Reggie Miller*IND	1,702	Dennis ScottORL	267	1998–99
1999–00	Gary Payton*SEA	177	Reggie Miller*IND	1,867	Reggie Miller*IND	1,867	Dennis ScottORL	267	1999–00
2000–01	Antoine WalkerBOS	221	Reggie Miller*IND	2,037	Reggie Miller*IND	2,037	Dennis ScottORL	267	2000–01
2001–02	Ray Allen*MIL	229	Reggie Miller*IND	2,217	Reggie Miller*IND	2,217	Dennis ScottORL	267	2001–02
2002–03	Ray Allen*MIL	201	Reggie Miller*IND	2,330	Reggie Miller*IND	2,330	Dennis ScottORL	267	2002–03
2003–04	Peja StojakovićSAC	240	Reggie Miller*IND	2,464	Reggie Miller*IND	2,464	Dennis ScottORL	267	2003–04
2004–05	Kyle KorverPHI; Quentin RichardsonPHX	226	Reggie Miller*IND	2,560	Reggie Miller*IND	2,560	Dennis ScottORL	267	2004–05
2005–06	Ray Allen*SEA	269	Ray Allen*; SEA 2005–07; BOS 2007–12; MIA 2012–14	1,755	Reggie Miller*IND	2,560	Ray Allen*SEA	269	2005–06
2006–07	Gilbert ArenasWAS; Raja BellPHX	205	Ray Allen*; SEA 2005–07; BOS 2007–12; MIA 2012–14	1,920	Reggie Miller*IND	2,560	Ray Allen*SEA	269	2006–07
2007–08	Jason RichardsonCHA	243	Ray Allen*; SEA 2005–07; BOS 2007–12; MIA 2012–14	2,100	Reggie Miller*IND	2,560	Ray Allen*SEA	269	2007–08
2008–09	Rashard LewisORL	220	Ray Allen*; SEA 2005–07; BOS 2007–12; MIA 2012–14	2,299	Reggie Miller*IND	2,560	Ray Allen*SEA	269	2008–09
2009–10	Aaron BrooksHOU	209	Ray Allen*; SEA 2005–07; BOS 2007–12; MIA 2012–14	2,444	Reggie Miller*IND	2,560	Ray Allen*SEA	269	2009–10
2010–11	Dorell WrightGSW	194	Ray Allen*; SEA 2005–07; BOS 2007–12; MIA 2012–14	2,612	Ray Allen*; BOS 2010–12; MIA 2012–14	2,612	Ray Allen*SEA	269	2010–11
2011–12	Ryan AndersonORL	166	Ray Allen*; SEA 2005–07; BOS 2007–12; MIA 2012–14	2,718	Ray Allen*; BOS 2010–12; MIA 2012–14	2,718	Ray Allen*SEA	269	2011–12
2012–13	Stephen Curry^GSW	272	Ray Allen*; SEA 2005–07; BOS 2007–12; MIA 2012–14	2,857	Ray Allen*; BOS 2010–12; MIA 2012–14	2,857	Stephen Curry^GSW	272	2012–13
2013–14	Stephen Curry^GSW	261	Ray Allen*; SEA 2005–07; BOS 2007–12; MIA 2012–14	2,973	Ray Allen*; BOS 2010–12; MIA 2012–14	2,973	Stephen Curry^GSW	272	2013–14
2014–15	Stephen Curry^GSW	286	Jason Terry; HOU 2014–16; MIL 2016–18	2,076	Ray Allen*; BOS 2010–12; MIA 2012–14	2,973	Stephen Curry^GSW	286	2014–15
2015–16	Stephen Curry^GSW	402	Jason Terry; HOU 2014–16; MIL 2016–18	2,169	Ray Allen*; BOS 2010–12; MIA 2012–14	2,973	Stephen Curry^GSW	402	2015–16
2016–17	Stephen Curry^GSW	324	Jason Terry; HOU 2014–16; MIL 2016–18	2,242	Ray Allen*; BOS 2010–12; MIA 2012–14	2,973	Stephen Curry^GSW	402	2016–17
2017–18	James Harden^HOU	265	Jason Terry; HOU 2014–16; MIL 2016–18	2,282	Ray Allen*; BOS 2010–12; MIA 2012–14	2,973	Stephen Curry^GSW	402	2017–18
2018–19	James Harden^HOU	378	Stephen Curry^GSW	2,483	Ray Allen*; BOS 2010–12; MIA 2012–14	2,973	Stephen Curry^GSW	402	2018–19
2019–20	James Harden^HOU	299	Stephen Curry^GSW	2,495	Ray Allen*; BOS 2010–12; MIA 2012–14	2,973	Stephen Curry^GSW	402	2019–20
2020–21	Stephen Curry^GSW	337	Stephen Curry^GSW	2,832	Ray Allen*; BOS 2010–12; MIA 2012–14	2,973	Stephen Curry^GSW	402	2020–21
2021–22	Stephen Curry^GSW	285	Stephen Curry^GSW	3,117	Stephen Curry^GSW	3,117	Stephen Curry^GSW	402	2021–22
2022–23	Klay Thompson^GSW	301	Stephen Curry^GSW	3,390	Stephen Curry^GSW	3,390	Stephen Curry^GSW	402	2022–23
2023–24	Stephen Curry^GSW	357	Stephen Curry^GSW	3,747	Stephen Curry^GSW	3,747	Stephen Curry^GSW	402	2023–24
2024–25	Anthony Edwards^MIN	320	Stephen Curry^GSW	4,058	Stephen Curry^GSW	4,058	Stephen Curry^GSW	402	2024–25
2025–26	Kon Knueppel^CHA	273	Stephen Curry^GSW	4,248	Stephen Curry^GSW	4,248	Stephen Curry^GSW	402	2025–26
2026–27	Luka Dončić^LAL	74	Stephen Curry^GSW	4,291	Stephen Curry^GSW	4,291	Stephen Curry^GSW	402	2026–27
Season	Year-by-year leader	3P	Active player leader	3P	Career record	3P	Single-season record	3P	Season

== See also ==
- List of NBA single-game 3-point field goal leaders
- List of NBA career playoff 3-point scoring leaders
- List of NBA regular season records
- List of WNBA career 3-point scoring leaders
- List of NBA career 3-point field goal percentage leaders
- List of NBA annual 3-point scoring leaders
- List of NBA annual 3-point field goal percentage leaders
