= 2020–21 Golden State Warriors season =

Season of a National Basketball Association team

- Head coach: Steve Kerr
- President: Bob Myers
- General manager: Bob Myers
- Owners: Joe Lacob; Peter Guber
- Arena: Chase Center

Results
- Record: 39–33 (.542)
- Place: Division: 4th (Pacific); Conference: 8th (Western)
- Playoff finish: Did not qualify
- Stats at Basketball Reference

Local media
- Television: NBC Sports Bay Area
- Radio: 95.7 The Game

The 2020–21 Golden State Warriors season was the 75th season of the franchise in the National Basketball Association (NBA), its 59th in the San Francisco Bay Area, and their second season playing home games at Chase Center. They were coached by Steve Kerr, in his seventh year as head coach.

This season Stephen Curry became the franchise's all-time scoring leader when he broke Wilt Chamberlain's record of 17,783 points that stood for 57 years. Curry moved into second on the all-time career three-point scoring list with 2,832, 141 behind the record holder Ray Allen. Curry was the league Scoring Champion for the second time in his career, averaging 32 points per game. Curry was named to the All-NBA First Team, his seventh selection to an All-NBA Team, a Warriors franchise record. Draymond Green was named to the All-Defensive First Team for the fourth time in his career, and sixth All-NBA Team overall.

After a one-year absence from postseason, the Warriors qualified for the first stage of the new Play-in Tournament as the No. 8 seed. As such, the Warriors had the double chance to advance. However, in the seventh seed game, they lost to the defending champion Los Angeles Lakers, 100–103, dropping to the elimination round of the play-in against Memphis Grizzlies, which they lost, 112–117 in overtime. The Warriors would not miss the playoffs again until 2024 when they lost to the Sacramento Kings in the play-in.

== Previous season ==
The Warriors finished the 2019–20 season 15–50 to finish in last place in the Western Conference having the worst record in the Conference.

== Preseason ==
The Warriors entered the season with a chance to come back into championship contention after missing the playoffs for the first time since 2012. With the COVID-19 pandemic forcing the 2019–20 NBA season to be temporarily suspended, the Warriors had not played a game since March 2020.

On November 17, 2020, the NBA announced the 2020–21 season would begin on December 22, 2020.

The Warriors started the season with a healthy Stephen Curry, as he previously injured his second metacarpal bone in his left finger against the Phoenix Suns at Chase Center on October 30, 2019, causing him to miss 60 of the 65 games available and playing in 5 of those respective games. The Warriors also expect to have a healthy Kevon Looney, who was struggling with neuropathy for most of the season, as he only played 20 games. Klay Thompson was also expected to be healthy this season, but on November 19, 2020, it was announced that he would miss the entire season due to injuring his right Achilles tendon. Thompson hadn't played in an NBA game since Game 6 of the 2019 NBA Finals. After sitting out for two consecutive seasons, he finally made his return on January 9, 2022, against the Cleveland Cavaliers, recording 17 points and 3 rebounds in a 96–82 win.

As a result of being the worst team in the league, the Warriors were in the NBA draft lottery and they received the second overall selection. With that selection, the Warriors drafted Memphis center James Wiseman. They also selected point guard Nico Mannion with the 48th pick and shooting guard Justinian Jessup with the 51st pick.

== Draft ==
Round	Pick	Player	Position	Nationality	School / club team
1	2	James Wiseman	C	United States	Memphis (Fr.)
2	48	Nico Mannion	PG	Italy	Arizona (Fr.)
2	51	Justinian Jessup	SG	United States	Boise State (Sr.)

Before the start of the 2020 NBA draft period, the Warriors' selection was held stuck as the #1 selection of the draft with their record being the worst of all NBA teams the prior season at 15–50 before the NBA suspended their season on March 12, 2020, and cancelled the rest of Golden State's season by June 5. As a result, they held the best odds to stay at #1 alongside the Minnesota Timberwolves and Cleveland Cavaliers for the 2020 draft, though also holding the highest odds to fall as low as the #5 pick with 47.9% odds of dropping there. The Warriors ended the 2020 NBA draft lottery with the #2 selection, dropping down one spot with the Timberwolves moving up to the #1 position. In addition to their first-round pick, the Warriors also gained two second-round picks from previous trades involving the Dallas Mavericks.

== Standings ==
=== Division ===
Pacific Division	W	L	PCT	GB	Home	Road	Div	GP
y – Phoenix Suns	51	21	.708	–	27‍–‍9	24‍–‍12	7–5	72
x – Los Angeles Clippers	47	25	.653	4.0	26‍–‍10	21‍–‍15	9–3	72
x – Los Angeles Lakers	42	30	.583	9.0	21‍–‍15	21‍–‍15	4–8	72
pi – Golden State Warriors	39	33	.542	12.0	25‍–‍11	14‍–‍22	5–7	72
Sacramento Kings	31	41	.431	20.0	16‍–‍20	15‍–‍21	5–7	72

=== Conference ===
Western Conference
#	Team	W	L	PCT	GB	GP
1	z – Utah Jazz *	52	20	.722	–	72
2	y – Phoenix Suns *	51	21	.708	1.0	72
3	x – Denver Nuggets	47	25	.653	5.0	72
4	x – Los Angeles Clippers	47	25	.653	5.0	72
5	y – Dallas Mavericks *	42	30	.583	10.0	72
6	x – Portland Trail Blazers	42	30	.583	10.0	72
7	x – Los Angeles Lakers	42	30	.583	10.0	72
8	pi – Golden State Warriors	39	33	.542	13.0	72
9	x – Memphis Grizzlies	38	34	.528	14.0	72
10	pi – San Antonio Spurs	33	39	.458	19.0	72
11	New Orleans Pelicans	31	41	.431	21.0	72
12	Sacramento Kings	31	41	.431	21.0	72
13	Minnesota Timberwolves	23	49	.319	29.0	72
14	Oklahoma City Thunder	22	50	.306	30.0	72
15	Houston Rockets	17	55	.236	35.0	72

Notes

- z – Clinched home court advantage for the entire playoffs
- y – Clinched division title
- x – Clinched playoff spot
- * – Division leader

== Roster ==
2020–21 Golden State Warriors roster
Players

Pos.	No.	Player	Height	Weight	DOB	From
G/F	26	Kent Bazemore	6 ft 4 in (1.93 m)	195 lb (88 kg)	1989-07-01	Old Dominion
F	20	Jordan Bell (TW)	6 ft 9 in (2.06 m)	216 lb (98 kg)	1995-01-07	Oregon
G	30	Stephen Curry (C)	6 ft 3 in (1.91 m)	185 lb (84 kg)	1988-03-14	Davidson
F	23	Draymond Green (C)	6 ft 6 in (1.98 m)	230 lb (104 kg)	1990-03-04	Michigan State
G	1	Damion Lee	6 ft 5 in (1.96 m)	210 lb (95 kg)	1992-10-21	Louisville
C	5	Kevon Looney	6 ft 9 in (2.06 m)	222 lb (101 kg)	1996-02-06	UCLA
G	2	Nico Mannion (TW)	6 ft 2 in (1.88 m)	190 lb (86 kg)	2001-03-14	Arizona
G	15	Mychal Mulder	6 ft 3 in (1.91 m)	184 lb (83 kg)	1994-06-14	Kentucky
G/F	12	Kelly Oubre	6 ft 7 in (2.01 m)	203 lb (92 kg)	1995-12-09	Kansas
F	7	Eric Paschall	6 ft 6 in (1.98 m)	255 lb (116 kg)	1996-11-04	Villanova
G	0	Gary Payton	6 ft 3 in (1.91 m)	195 lb (88 kg)	1992-12-01	Oregon State
G	3	Jordan Poole	6 ft 4 in (1.93 m)	194 lb (88 kg)	1999-06-19	Michigan
F	6	Alen Smailagić	6 ft 10 in (2.08 m)	215 lb (98 kg)	2000-08-18	Serbia
G	11	Klay Thompson (C)	6 ft 6 in (1.98 m)	215 lb (98 kg)	1990-02-08	Washington State
F	95	Juan Toscano-Anderson	6 ft 6 in (1.98 m)	209 lb (95 kg)	1993-04-10	Marquette
F	22	Andrew Wiggins	6 ft 8 in (2.03 m)	197 lb (89 kg)	1995-02-23	Kansas
C	33	James Wiseman	7 ft 1 in (2.16 m)	240 lb (109 kg)	2001-03-31	Memphis

Coaches
Head coach
- Steve Kerr
Assistant(s)
- Ron Adams
- Mike Brown
- Jarron Collins
- Bruce Fraser

Legend
- (DP) Unsigned draft pick
- (FA) Free agent
- (S) Suspended
- (GL) On assignment to G League affiliate
- (TW) Two-way affiliate player
- Injured

Roster
Updated: May 16, 2021

=== Roster notes ===
- Klay Thompson missed the entire season with a torn right Achilles tendon.

== Game log ==
=== Preseason ===
2020 preseason game log
Total: 2–1 (Home: 1–0; Road: 1–1)
Preseason: 2–1 (home: 1–0; road: 1–1)

Game	Date	Team	Score	High points	High rebounds	High assists	Location Attendance	Record
1	December 12	Denver	W 107–105	Kent Bazemore (13)	Eric Paschall (7)	4 tied (3)	Chase Center; 0	1–0
2	December 15	@ Sacramento	L 113–114	Stephen Curry (29)	Marquese Chriss (9)	4 tied (4)	Golden 1 Center; 0	1–1
3	December 17	@ Sacramento	W 113–105	Stephen Curry (29)	Marquese Chriss (12)	Curry, Looney, Wiggins (3)	Golden 1 Center; 0	2–1

2020–21 preseason schedule

=== Regular season ===
The schedule for the first two games of the season was released on December 2, 2020, while the schedule for the first half of the season was released on December 4. The schedule for the second half of the season was released on February 24, 2021.

2020–21 game log
Total: 39–33 (Home: 25–11; Road: 14–22)
December: 2–2 (home: 0–0; road: 2–2)

Game	Date	Team	Score	High points	High rebounds	High assists	Location Attendance	Record
1	December 22	@ Brooklyn	L 99–125	Stephen Curry (20)	Marquese Chriss (8)	Stephen Curry (10)	Barclays Center; 0	0–1
2	December 25	@ Milwaukee	L 99–138	Stephen Curry (19)	James Wiseman (8)	Stephen Curry (6)	Fiserv Forum; 0	0–2
3	December 27	@ Chicago	W 129–128	Stephen Curry (36)	Kelly Oubre Jr. (11)	Stephen Curry (6)	United Center; 0	1–2
4	December 29	@ Detroit	W 116–106	Stephen Curry (31)	Andrew Wiggins (7)	Stephen Curry (6)	Little Caesars Arena; 0	2–2

January: 9–7 (home: 8–4; road: 1–3)

Game	Date	Team	Score	High points	High rebounds	High assists	Location Attendance	Record
5	January 1	Portland	L 98–123	Stephen Curry (26)	Stephen Curry (8)	Stephen Curry (5)	Chase Center; 0	2–3
6	January 3	Portland	W 137–122	Stephen Curry (62)	James Wiseman (11)	Draymond Green (8)	Chase Center; 0	3–3
7	January 4	Sacramento	W 137–106	Stephen Curry (30)	Stephen Curry (9)	Stephen Curry (8)	Chase Center; 0	4–3
8	January 6	L. A. Clippers	L 101–108	Paschall, Wiggins (19)	Draymond Green (6)	Draymond Green (6)	Chase Center; 0	4–4
9	January 8	L. A. Clippers	W 115–105	Stephen Curry (38)	4 tied (6)	Stephen Curry (11)	Chase Center; 0	5–4
10	January 10	Toronto	W 106–105	Andrew Wiggins (17)	Curry, Green (9)	Draymond Green (10)	Chase Center; 0	6–4
11	January 12	Indiana	L 95–104	Andrew Wiggins (22)	Looney, Wiseman (9)	Draymond Green (10)	Chase Center; 0	6–5
12	January 14	@ Denver	L 104–114	Stephen Curry (35)	Stephen Curry (11)	Draymond Green (7)	Ball Arena; 0	6–6
—	January 15	@ Phoenix	Postponed (COVID-19) (Makeup date: March 4)					
13	January 18	@ L. A. Lakers	W 115–113	Stephen Curry (26)	Draymond Green (8)	Draymond Green (9)	Staples Center; 0	7–6
14	January 20	San Antonio	W 121–99	Stephen Curry (26)	Stephen Curry (11)	Stephen Curry (7)	Chase Center; 0	8–6
15	January 21	New York	L 104–119	Stephen Curry (30)	Andrew Wiggins (9)	Draymond Green (8)	Chase Center; 0	8–7
16	January 23	@ Utah	L 108–127	Stephen Curry (24)	Stephen Curry (7)	Stephen Curry (7)	Vivint Arena; 1,932	8–8
17	January 25	Minnesota	W 130–108	Stephen Curry (36)	Green, Oubre Jr., Wiggins (6)	Green, Looney, Oubre Jr. (4)	Chase Center; 0	9–8
18	January 27	Minnesota	W 123–111	James Wiseman (25)	Kevon Looney (10)	Curry, Green (8)	Chase Center; 0	10–8
19	January 28	@ Phoenix	L 93–114	Stephen Curry (27)	Lee, Wiseman (6)	Draymond Green (6)	Phoenix Suns Arena; 0	10–9
20	January 30	Detroit	W 118–91	Stephen Curry (28)	James Wiseman (9)	Curry, Wanamaker (7)	Chase Center; 0	11–9

February: 8–7 (home: 4–2; road: 4–5)

Game	Date	Team	Score	High points	High rebounds	High assists	Location Attendance	Record
21	February 2	Boston	L 107–111	Stephen Curry (38)	Curry, Green (11)	Stephen Curry (8)	Chase Center; 0	11–10
22	February 4	@ Dallas	W 147–116	Kelly Oubre Jr. (40)	Oubre Jr., Toscano-Anderson (8)	Draymond Green (15)	American Airlines Center; 0	12–10
23	February 6	@ Dallas	L 132–134	Stephen Curry (57)	Juan Toscano-Anderson (10)	Draymond Green (15)	American Airlines Center; 0	12–11
24	February 8	@ San Antonio	L 100–105	Stephen Curry (32)	Juan Toscano-Anderson (11)	Draymond Green (10)	AT&T Center; 0	12–12
25	February 9	@ San Antonio	W 114–91	Stephen Curry (32)	Kelly Oubre Jr. (10)	Draymond Green (11)	AT&T Center; 0	13–12
26	February 11	Orlando	W 111–105	Stephen Curry (40)	Kelly Oubre Jr. (10)	Draymond Green (11)	Chase Center; 0	14–12
27	February 13	Brooklyn	L 117–134	Stephen Curry (27)	Kelly Oubre Jr. (10)	Draymond Green (8)	Chase Center; 0	14–13
28	February 15	Cleveland	W 129–98	Stephen Curry (36)	Green, Paschall (8)	Draymond Green (16)	Chase Center; 0	15–13
29	February 17	Miami	W 120–112 (OT)	Kent Bazemore (26)	Bazemore, Oubre Jr., Wiggins (8)	Stephen Curry (11)	Chase Center; 0	16–13
30	February 19	@ Orlando	L 120–124	Stephen Curry (29)	Curry, Oubre Jr. (7)	Stephen Curry (11)	Amway Center; 4,287	16–14
31	February 20	@ Charlotte	L 100–102	Kelly Oubre Jr. (25)	Draymond Green (7)	Brad Wanamaker (5)	Spectrum Center; 0	16–15
32	February 23	@ New York	W 114–106	Stephen Curry (37)	Draymond Green (9)	Draymond Green (12)	Madison Square Garden; 1,981	17–15
33	February 24	@ Indiana	W 111–107	Stephen Curry (24)	Draymond Green (9)	Draymond Green (11)	Bankers Life Fieldhouse; 0	18–15
34	February 26	Charlotte	W 130–121	Stephen Curry (29)	Draymond Green (12)	Draymond Green (19)	Chase Center; 0	19–15
35	February 28	@ L. A. Lakers	L 91–117	Eric Paschall (18)	James Wiseman (8)	Stephen Curry (7)	Staples Center; 0	19–16

March: 4–8 (home: 2–3; road: 2–5)

Game	Date	Team	Score	High points	High rebounds	High assists	Location Attendance	Record
36	March 3	@ Portland	L 106–108	Stephen Curry (35)	Draymond Green (9)	Draymond Green (12)	Moda Center; 0	19–17
37	March 4	@ Phoenix	L 98–120	Jordan Poole (26)	James Wiseman (11)	Nico Mannion (6)	Phoenix Suns Arena; 3,233	19–18
38	March 11	@ L. A. Clippers	L 104–130	Oubre Jr., Wiggins (15)	Andrew Wiggins (8)	Jordan Poole (4)	Staples Center; 0	19–19
39	March 14	Utah	W 131–119	Stephen Curry (32)	Draymond Green (12)	Draymond Green (12)	Chase Center; 0	20–19
40	March 15	L. A. Lakers	L 97–128	Stephen Curry (27)	James Wiseman (8)	Draymond Green (7)	Chase Center; 0	20–20
41	March 17	@ Houston	W 108–94	Jordan Poole (23)	Draymond Green (12)	Draymond Green (10)	Toyota Center; 3,259	21–20
42	March 19	@ Memphis	W 116–103	Andrew Wiggins (40)	Draymond Green (11)	Draymond Green (13)	FedExForum; 2,716	22–20
43	March 20	@ Memphis	L 103–111	Jordan Poole (26)	Andrew Wiggins (9)	Juan Toscano-Anderson (6)	FedExForum; 0	22–21
44	March 23	Philadelphia	L 98–108	Kelly Oubre Jr. (24)	Kelly Oubre Jr. (10)	Green, Mannion (6)	Chase Center; 0	22–22
45	March 25	@ Sacramento	L 119–141	Andrew Wiggins (26)	Andrew Wiggins (10)	Jordan Poole (5)	Golden 1 Center; 0	22–23
46	March 26	Atlanta	L 108–124	Andrew Wiggins (29)	Andrew Wiggins (7)	Draymond Green (9)	Chase Center; 0	22–24
47	March 29	Chicago	W 116–102	Stephen Curry (32)	Kelly Oubre Jr. (11)	Draymond Green (9)	Chase Center; 0	23–24

April: 8–8 (home: 5–2; road: 3–6)

Game	Date	Team	Score	High points	High rebounds	High assists	Location Attendance	Record
48	April 1	@ Miami	L 109–116	Stephen Curry (36)	Stephen Curry (11)	Draymond Green (8)	American Airlines Arena; 0	23–25
49	April 2	@ Toronto	L 77–130	Andrew Wiggins (15)	Kelly Oubre Jr. (7)	Nico Mannion (4)	Amalie Arena; 3,085	23–26
50	April 4	@ Atlanta	L 111–117	Stephen Curry (37)	Kelly Oubre Jr. (11)	Draymond Green (11)	State Farm Arena; 2,937	23–27
51	April 6	Milwaukee	W 122–121	Stephen Curry (41)	James Wiseman (10)	Draymond Green (8)	Chase Center; 0	24–27
52	April 9	Washington	L 107–110	Stephen Curry (32)	Andrew Wiggins (7)	Draymond Green (8)	Chase Center; 0	24–28
53	April 10	Houston	W 125–109	Stephen Curry (38)	Stephen Curry (8)	Draymond Green (7)	Chase Center; 0	25–28
54	April 12	Denver	W 116–107	Stephen Curry (53)	Kevon Looney (11)	Draymond Green (7)	Chase Center; 0	26–28
55	April 14	@ Oklahoma City	W 147–109	Stephen Curry (42)	Draymond Green (10)	Draymond Green (16)	Chesapeake Energy Arena; 0	27–28
56	April 15	@ Cleveland	W 119–101	Stephen Curry (33)	Green, Looney (10)	Draymond Green (8)	Rocket Mortgage FieldHouse; 4,148	28–28
57	April 17	@ Boston	L 114–119	Stephen Curry (47)	Kevon Looney (9)	Draymond Green (10)	TD Garden; 2,298	28–29
58	April 19	@ Philadelphia	W 107–96	Stephen Curry (49)	Kevon Looney (15)	Draymond Green (6)	Wells Fargo Center; 4,094	29–29
59	April 21	@ Washington	L 114–118	Kelly Oubre Jr. (24)	Bazemore, Oubre Jr. (9)	Curry, Green (8)	Capital One Arena; 2,133	29–30
60	April 23	Denver	W 118–97	Stephen Curry (32)	Draymond Green (12)	Draymond Green (19)	Chase Center; 1,935	30–30
61	April 25	Sacramento	W 117–113	Stephen Curry (37)	Draymond Green (14)	Draymond Green (13)	Chase Center; 3,252	31–30
62	April 27	Dallas	L 103–133	Stephen Curry (27)	Draymond Green (11)	Mannion, Wiggins (5)	Chase Center; 3,613	31–31
63	April 29	@ Minnesota	L 114–126	Stephen Curry (37)	Kent Bazemore (10)	Stephen Curry (8)	Target Center; 1,638	31–32

May: 8–1 (home: 6–0; road: 2–1)

Game	Date	Team	Score	High points	High rebounds	High assists	Location Attendance	Record
64	May 1	@ Houston	W 113–87	Stephen Curry (30)	Draymond Green (11)	Draymond Green (8)	Toyota Center; 3,702	32–32
65	May 3	@ New Orleans	W 123–108	Stephen Curry (41)	Draymond Green (13)	Draymond Green (15)	Smoothie King Center; 3,700	33–32
66	May 4	@ New Orleans	L 103–108	Stephen Curry (37)	Draymond Green (12)	Draymond Green (9)	Smoothie King Center; 3,700	33–33
67	May 6	Oklahoma City	W 118–97	Stephen Curry (34)	Kevon Looney (10)	Draymond Green (9)	Chase Center; 3,621	34–33
68	May 8	Oklahoma City	W 136–97	Stephen Curry (49)	Kevon Looney (12)	Draymond Green (13)	Chase Center; 4,155	35–33
69	May 10	Utah	W 119–116	Stephen Curry (36)	Kevon Looney (13)	Draymond Green (10)	Chase Center; 4,155	36–33
70	May 11	Phoenix	W 122–116	Andrew Wiggins (38)	Draymond Green (10)	Draymond Green (11)	Chase Center; 4,155	37–33
71	May 14	New Orleans	W 125–122	Jordan Poole (38)	Juan Toscano-Anderson (9)	Juan Toscano-Anderson (9)	Chase Center; 4,155	38–33
72	May 16	Memphis	W 113–101	Stephen Curry (46)	Kevon Looney (11)	Curry, Green (9)	Chase Center; 4,416	39–33

2020–21 season schedule

=== Play-in ===
The Warriors finished the regular season with the 8th-best record in the Western Conference, and qualified for the play-in games instituted in the 2020 NBA playoffs. Needing to win only one of possibly two games they could play, they lost to the Lakers who took the 7th seed with the victory, then lost to the Grizzlies in overtime who captured the 8th seed in the conference.

2021 play-in game log
Total: 0–2 (Home: 0–1; Road: 0–1)
Play-in: 0–2 (home: 0–1; road: 0–1)

Game	Date	Team	Score	High points	High rebounds	High assists	Location Attendance	Record
1	May 19	@ L.A. Lakers	L 100–103	Stephen Curry (37)	Kevon Looney (13)	Draymond Green (8)	Staples Center; 6,022	0–1
2	May 21	Memphis	L 112–117 (OT)	Stephen Curry (39)	Draymond Green (16)	Draymond Green (10)	Chase Center; 7,505	0–2

== Player statistics ==
Legend
GP	Games played	GS	Games started	MPG	Minutes per game
FG%	Field-goal percentage	3P%	3-point field-goal percentage	FT%	Free-throw percentage
RPG	Rebounds per game	APG	Assists per game	SPG	Steals per game
BPG	Blocks per game	PPG	Points per game

=== Regular season ===
Golden State Warriors statistics
Player	GP	GS	MPG	FG%	3P%	FT%	RPG	APG	SPG	BPG	PPG
Kent Bazemore	67	18	19.9	.449	.408	.692	3.4	1.6	1.0	.5	7.2
Jordan Bell ^{≠}	1	0	15.0	.000	—	.500	5.0	2.0	.0	2.0	1.0
Marquese Chriss ^{†}	2	0	13.5	.357	.200	.500	6.5	1.0	.0	1.0	6.5
Stephen Curry	63	63	34.2	.482	.421	.916	5.5	5.8	1.2	.1	32.0
Draymond Green	63	63	31.5	.447	.270	.795	7.1	8.9	1.7	.8	7.0
Damion Lee	57	1	18.9	.467	.397	.909	3.2	1.3	.7	.1	6.5
Kevon Looney	61	34	19.0	.548	.235	.646	5.3	2.0	.3	.4	4.1
Nico Mannion	30	1	12.1	.342	.367	.821	1.5	2.3	.5	.0	4.1
Mychal Mulder	60	6	12.8	.449	.397	.636	1.0	.4	.2	.2	5.6
Kelly Oubre Jr.	55	50	30.7	.439	.316	.695	6.0	1.3	1.0	.8	15.4
Eric Paschall	40	2	17.4	.497	.333	.713	3.2	1.3	.3	.2	9.5
Gary Payton II ^{≠}	10	0	4.0	.769	.500	.750	1.1	.1	.6	.1	2.5
Jordan Poole	51	7	19.4	.432	.351	.882	1.8	1.9	.5	.2	12.0
Alen Smailagić	15	1	5.6	.407	.400	.333	1.1	.3	.2	.3	1.9
Juan Toscano-Anderson	53	16	20.9	.579	.402	.710	4.4	2.8	.8	.5	5.7
Brad Wanamaker ^{†}	39	0	16.0	.353	.213	.893	1.7	2.5	.7	.2	4.7
Andrew Wiggins	71	71	33.3	.477	.380	.714	4.9	2.4	.9	1.0	18.6
James Wiseman	39	27	21.4	.519	.316	.628	5.8	.7	.3	.9	11.5

After all games.
^{‡} Waived during the season
^{†} Traded during the season
^{≠} Acquired during the season

== Transactions ==
=== Trades ===
November 22, 2020	To Golden State Warriors • (United States) Kelly Oubre Jr.	To Oklahoma City Thunder • 2021 conditional first-round pick • 2021 DEN second-round pick
March 25, 2021	To Golden State Warriors • Draft rights to (Haiti) Cady Lalanne (2015 No. 55)	To San Antonio Spurs • (United States) Marquese Chriss • Cash considerations
March 25, 2021	To Golden State Warriors • 2025 protected second-round pick	To Charlotte Hornets • (United States) Brad Wanamaker • 2022 TOR protected second-round pick • Cash considerations

=== Free agency ===
==== Re-signed ====
Date	Player	Ref.
December 22, 2020	(Mexico) Juan Toscano-Anderson	

==== Additions ====
Date	Player	Former team	Ref.
November 24, 2020	(United States) Brad Wanamaker	Boston Celtics	
December 1, 2020	(United States) Kent Bazemore	Sacramento Kings	
April 8, 2021	(United States) Gary Payton II	Raptors 905 (NBA G League)	
May 13, 2021	(United States) Jordan Bell	Washington Wizards	

==== Subtractions ====
Date	Player	Reason	New team	Ref.
November 20, 2020	(United States) Ky Bowman	Waived	Los Angeles Clippers	
December 19, 2020	(Mexico) Juan Toscano-Anderson	Waived	Golden State Warriors	

== Awards ==
Recipient	Award	Date awarded	Ref.
(United States) Stephen Curry	Western Conference Player of the Week	December 28 – January 3	
(United States) Stephen Curry	Western Conference Player of the Week	April 12 – 18	
(United States) Stephen Curry	Western Conference Player of the Month	April	
(United States) Stephen Curry	Western Conference Player of the Month	May	
