= 2017–18 Golden State Warriors season =

Professional basketball team season (won NBA championship)

- NBA champions
- Conference champions
- Division champions
- Head coach: Steve Kerr
- General manager: Bob Myers
- Owners: Joe Lacob; Peter Guber
- Arena: Oracle Arena

Results
- Record: 58–24 (.707)
- Place: Division: 1st (Pacific); Conference: 2nd (Western)
- Playoff finish: NBA champions (Defeated Cavaliers 4–0)
- Stats at Basketball Reference

Local media
- Television: NBC Sports Bay Area
- Radio: 95.7 The Game

The 2017–18 Golden State Warriors season was the 72nd season of the franchise in the National Basketball Association (NBA), and its 56th in the San Francisco Bay Area. The Warriors entered the season as the defending NBA champions and repeated, beating the Cleveland Cavaliers 4–0 in the Finals. It was the first time in NBA history and in North America's four major professional sports leagues that two teams had met to compete for a Championship for a fourth consecutive year. It was the Warriors' third championship in four years, and sixth overall. Golden State won the Pacific Division title and Western Conference Championship for the fourth consecutive season. In the playoffs, the Warriors defeated the San Antonio Spurs in the First Round 4–1 and the New Orleans Pelicans 4–1 in the Semi-finals. They beat the top-seeded Houston Rockets 4–3 in the Western Conference Finals. The entire team was honored with the Sports Illustrated Sportsman of the Year award.

The Warriors finished second in the Western Conference with a record of 58–24, their fifth most wins in franchise history. Golden State set the NBA record of 16 consecutive home wins in the playoffs, surpassing the 1990–91 Chicago Bulls. Stephen Curry set the NBA record for three-pointers made in an NBA Finals game with nine. Stephen Curry, Kevin Durant, Draymond Green, and Klay Thompson were all named to the All-Star Game, the first time in NBA history that a team has had four All-Stars in consecutive seasons, and just the ninth time in NBA history a single team has had four players in the game. Curry was named captain, being the leading vote getter from the Western Conference. The Warriors ended the regular season with a slew of injuries to all four of their All-Stars, including an MCL sprain for Curry that kept him out for six weeks, and lost ten of their last seventeen games. For the first time since the 2013–14 season, they did not clinch first place for home-court advantage for the playoffs and failed to win 60 games for the first time under Steve Kerr. This season marked David West's final season in the NBA. He retired on August 30, 2018, having won two NBA championships with the Warriors.

== Draft picks ==
The 2017 NBA draft was held on June 22, 2017, at the Barclays Center in Brooklyn. The Warriors did not have a pick, but acquired the Chicago Bulls's 38th pick in the second round for cash, having chosen power forward Jordan Bell out of Oregon. After the draft, the team signed Bell's former Oregon teammate, Chris Boucher, to a two-way contract.

== Preseason ==
On July 1, 2017, Stephen Curry agreed to re-sign with Golden State on a super-max five-year/$201m deal. The Warriors also resigned Kevin Durant, and their veteran core of Shaun Livingston, David West, Andre Iguodala, Zaza Pachulia and JaVale McGee. Golden State also added Nick Young and Omri Casspi on one-year deals.

== Records ==
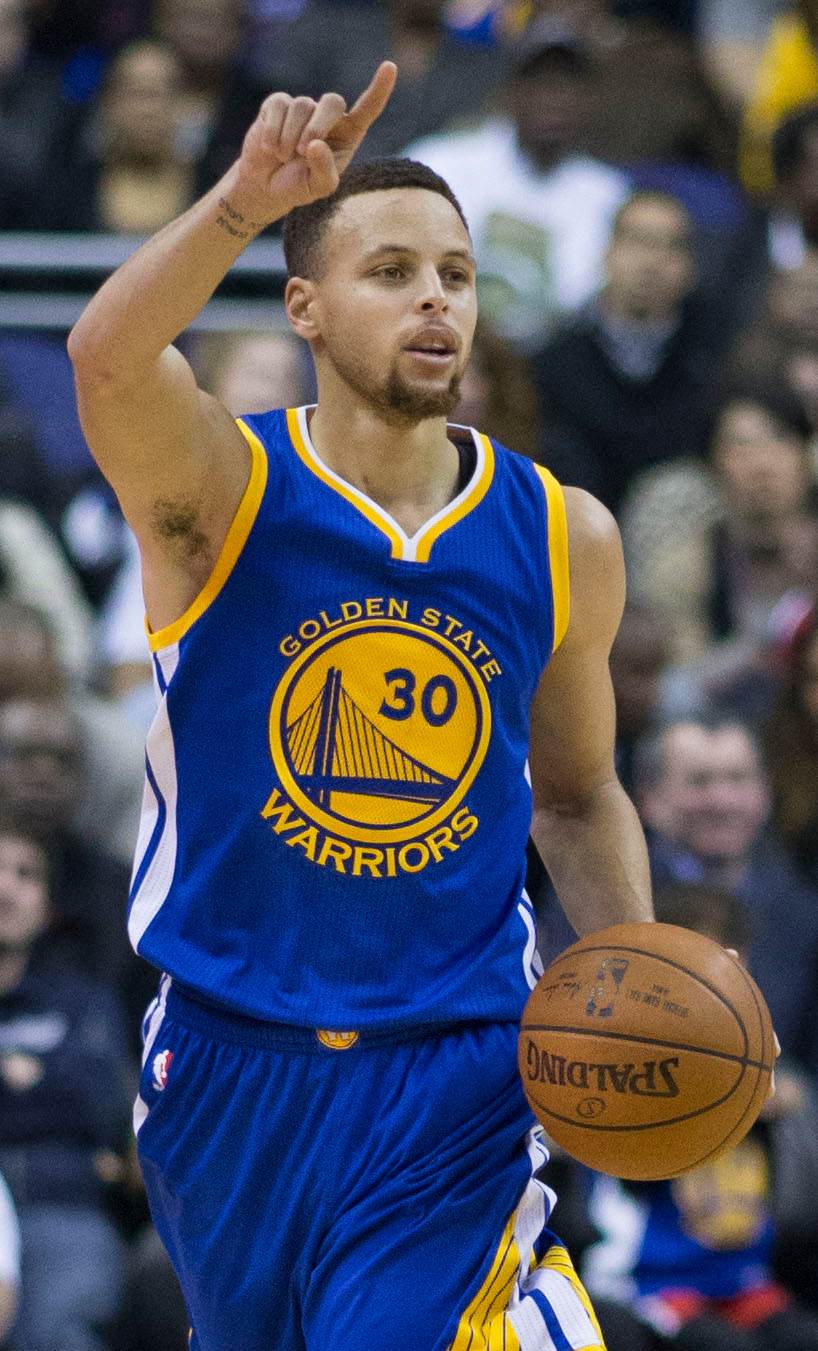
Stephen Curry broke multiple three-point records this season, including most made in an NBA Finals game with nine.

=== NBA records ===
As of June 8, 2018

==== Individual ====
- Most three-pointers made in a Finals game: 9 (Stephen Curry, Game 2 of 2018 NBA Finals)
- Most consecutive playoff games with a made three-pointer: 90 - ongoing streak (Stephen Curry, has made a three-pointer in every playoff game he's played in at this point)
- Most three-pointers made in a four-game Finals series: 22 (Stephen Curry, previous record was 11 (jointly held by Robert Horry and Penny Hardaway)
- Most consecutive playoff games with a made three-pointer at home: 46 - ongoing streak (Stephen Curry)
- Most consecutive playoff games with a made three-pointer on the road: 44 - ongoing streak (Stephen Curry)
- Most three-pointers made in a quarter in the Finals game: 5 (Stephen Curry, Game 2 of 2018 NBA Finals. Tied with Kenny Smith.)
- Most points scored by a player in a Western Conference Finals series: 213 (Kevin Durant, previous record of 212 points jointly held by Hakeem Olajuwon (1995) and Shaquille O'Neal (2002))
- 10 or more three-pointers made in a game: 9 times (Stephen Curry). Klay Thompson (4 times) and J. R. Smith (3 times) are the only other players in NBA history with more than one game with ten made threes.

==== Team ====
- Largest average point differential in a Finals series: +15.00 PPG (vs Cavs)
- Highest postseason winning percentage over a four-year-span: 63–20 (.795) from 2015 to 2018, the Chicago Bulls are second with 51–17 (.750) from 1991 to 1994.
- Most consecutive playoff home wins: 16 (surpassing the 1990–91 Chicago Bulls record of 15. The Warriors record dates back to 2017, where they went 9–0 at home)
- Most consecutive playoff series with a road win: 19 (tied with the Miami Heat)
- Half-time comebacks: First team in NBA history to come back from 20+ point deficits at half-time twice in the same season (22 against the Philadelphia 76ers and 20 against the New Orleans Pelicans)
- Largest comeback by a road team at halftime in a Game 7 in the playoffs: 11 points down (vs. the Rockets, won 101–92)
- First team in NBA history to win multiple elimination games in the same series despite trailing by 10-or-more at halftime: Western Conference Finals vs Rockets
- Highest +/- scoring differential in the 3rd quarter during the playoffs: Outscored opponents in the 3rd quarter by 153 points

=== Franchise records ===
==== Individual ====
- Most triple-doubles in franchise history: 22 (Draymond Green, he broke Tom Gola's record of 20)
- Most three-pointers made in the playoffs: 378 (Stephen Curry, Ray Allen holds the NBA record with 385)
- First Warriors player to average a triple-double in a playoff series: Draymond Green (14.8 points, 11.8 rebounds and 10 assists) vs the Pelicans, only the 13th time in NBA history a player has averaged a triple double in a series
- Most triple-doubles in the post-season: 4 (Draymond Green, surpassed Tom Gola's record of 3)
- Most consecutive regular season games with a made three-pointer: 95 (Klay Thompson, third best in NBA history behind Stephen Curry (157) and Kyle Korver (127)
- Most playoff games played: 102 (Klay Thompson)

==== Team ====
- Most consecutive road wins: 14 (tied, also achieved in the 2015–16 season)
- Largest winning margin in the playoffs: 41 points (126–85, Game 3 against the Rockets)
- Fewest points allowed in a half in the playoffs: 25 points (Second half, Game 6 against the Rockets)
- Fewest points allowed in a quarter in the playoffs: 9 points (Fourth quarter, Game 6 against the Rockets)
- Most consecutive Western Conference Finals appearances: 4 (only the second team in NBA history to reach the Finals four times in a row. The Los Angeles Lakers appeared eight times in a row between 1982 and 1989)
- Road trip sweep: Six games (first Warriors team to sweep a six-game road trip, only the 11th team in NBA history to do so)
- Most points scored in the first half of a playoff game: 76 (against the Pelicans)
- Most consecutive trips to the NBA Finals: 4 (The Warriors are the fifth franchise in NBA history to reach the Finals in four-straight seasons, joining the Boston Celtics (10, 1957–1966; 4, 1984–87), Cleveland Cavaliers (4, 2015–18), Los Angeles Lakers (4, 1982–1985) and Miami Heat (4, 2011–2014))

== Roster ==
2017–18 Golden State Warriors roster
Players

Pos.	No.	Player	Height	Weight	DOB	From
F/C	2	Jordan Bell	6 ft 9 in (2.06 m)	224 lb (102 kg)	1995–01–07	Oregon
F	25	Chris Boucher (TW)	6 ft 10 in (2.08 m)	200 lb (91 kg)	1993–01–11	Oregon
G	4	Quinn Cook	6 ft 2 in (1.88 m)	179 lb (81 kg)	1993–03–23	Duke
G	30	Stephen Curry	6 ft 3 in (1.91 m)	190 lb (86 kg)	1988–03–14	Davidson
F	35	Kevin Durant	6 ft 9 in (2.06 m)	240 lb (109 kg)	1988–09–29	Texas
F	23	Draymond Green	6 ft 7 in (2.01 m)	230 lb (104 kg)	1990–03–04	Michigan State
G/F	9	Andre Iguodala	6 ft 6 in (1.98 m)	215 lb (98 kg)	1984–01–28	Arizona
C	15	Damian Jones	7 ft 0 in (2.13 m)	245 lb (111 kg)	1995–06–30	Vanderbilt
G	34	Shaun Livingston	6 ft 7 in (2.01 m)	192 lb (87 kg)	1985–09–11	Peoria Central HS (IL)
F	5	Kevon Looney	6 ft 9 in (2.06 m)	220 lb (100 kg)	1996–02–06	UCLA
G	0	Patrick McCaw	6 ft 7 in (2.01 m)	185 lb (84 kg)	1995–10–25	UNLV
C	1	JaVale McGee	7 ft 0 in (2.13 m)	270 lb (122 kg)	1988–01–19	Nevada
C	27	Zaza Pachulia	6 ft 11 in (2.11 m)	270 lb (122 kg)	1984–02–10	Georgia
G	11	Klay Thompson	6 ft 7 in (2.01 m)	215 lb (98 kg)	1990–02–08	Washington State
F	3	David West	6 ft 9 in (2.06 m)	250 lb (113 kg)	1980–08–29	Xavier
G/F	6	Nick Young	6 ft 7 in (2.01 m)	210 lb (95 kg)	1985–06–01	USC

Coaches
Head coach
- Steve Kerr
Assistant(s)
- Mike Brown (associate HC)
- Ron Adams
- Jarron Collins
- Chris DeMarco (player development)
- Bruce Fraser (player development)
- Willie Green (player development)

Legend
- (DP) Unsigned draft pick
- (FA) Free agent
- (S) Suspended
- (GL) On assignment to G League affiliate
- (TW) Two-way affiliate player
- Injured

Roster
Updated: 2018–04–10

== Standings ==
=== Division ===
Pacific Division	W	L	PCT	GB	Home	Road	Div	GP
y – Golden State Warriors	58	24	.707	–	29‍–‍12	29‍–‍12	13–3	82
Los Angeles Clippers	42	40	.512	16.0	22‍–‍19	20‍–‍21	12–4	82
Los Angeles Lakers	35	47	.427	23.0	20‍–‍21	15‍–‍26	6–10	82
Sacramento Kings	27	55	.329	31.0	14‍–‍27	13‍–‍28	5–11	82
Phoenix Suns	21	61	.256	37.0	10‍–‍31	11‍–‍30	4–12	82

=== Conference ===
Western Conference
#	Team	W	L	PCT	GB	GP
1	z – Houston Rockets *	65	17	.793	–	82
2	y – Golden State Warriors *	58	24	.707	7.0	82
3	y – Portland Trail Blazers *	49	33	.598	16.0	82
4	x – Oklahoma City Thunder	48	34	.585	17.0	82
5	x – Utah Jazz	48	34	.585	17.0	82
6	x – New Orleans Pelicans	48	34	.585	17.0	82
7	x – San Antonio Spurs	47	35	.573	18.0	82
8	x – Minnesota Timberwolves	47	35	.573	18.0	82
9	Denver Nuggets	46	36	.561	19.0	82
10	Los Angeles Clippers	42	40	.512	23.0	82
11	Los Angeles Lakers	35	47	.427	30.0	82
12	Sacramento Kings	27	55	.329	38.0	82
13	Dallas Mavericks	24	58	.293	41.0	82
14	Memphis Grizzlies	22	60	.268	43.0	82
15	Phoenix Suns	21	61	.256	44.0	82

== Game log ==
=== Preseason ===
2017 pre-season game log
Total: 2–2 (Home: 1–2; Road: 1–0)
Pre-season: 2–2 (home: 1–2; road: 1–0)

Game	Date	Team	Score	High points	High rebounds	High assists	Location Attendance	Record
1	September 30	Denver	L 102–108	Stephen Curry (11)	Draymond Green (8)	Draymond Green (4)	Oracle Arena; 19,596	0–1
2	October 5	Minnesota	L 97–111	Kevin Durant (20)	Curry, Green, Pachulia (6)	Draymond Green (8)	Shenzhen Universiade Sports Centre; 17,495	0–2
3	October 8	@ Minnesota	W 142–110	Stephen Curry (40)	Stephen Curry (6)	Stephen Curry (8)	Mercedes-Benz Arena; N/A	1–2
4	October 13	Sacramento	W 117–106	Stephen Curry (18)	Jordan Bell (11)	Klay Thompson (6)	Oracle Arena; 19,596	2–2

2017–18 season schedule

=== Regular season ===
2017–18 game log
Total: 58–24 (Home: 29–12; Road: 29–12)
October: 5–3 (home: 2–2; road: 3–1)

Game	Date	Team	Score	High points	High rebounds	High assists	Location Attendance	Record
1	October 17	Houston	L 121–122	Nick Young (23)	Draymond Green (11)	Draymond Green (13)	Oracle Arena; 19,596	0–1
2	October 20	@ New Orleans	W 128–120	Klay Thompson (33)	Zaza Pachulia (9)	Draymond Green (9)	Smoothie King Center; 18,171	1–1
3	October 21	@ Memphis	L 101–111	Stephen Curry (37)	Kevin Durant (13)	Draymond Green (6)	FedExForum; 17,794	1–2
4	October 23	@ Dallas	W 133–103	Stephen Curry (29)	Kevin Durant (8)	Curry, Green (8)	American Airlines Center; 19,875	2–2
5	October 25	Toronto	W 117–112	Stephen Curry (30)	Draymond Green (11)	Draymond Green (6)	Oracle Arena; 19,596	3–2
6	October 27	Washington	W 120–117	Kevin Durant (31)	Kevin Durant (11)	Stephen Curry (8)	Oracle Arena; 19,596	4–2
7	October 29	Detroit	L 107–115	Klay Thompson (29)	Draymond Green (13)	Stephen Curry (8)	Oracle Arena; 19,596	4–3
8	October 30	@ L.A. Clippers	W 141–113	Stephen Curry (31)	Draymond Green (9)	Curry, Thompson, Green (6)	Staples Center; 19,068	5–3

November : 11–3 (home: 6–1; road: 5–2)

Game	Date	Team	Score	High points	High rebounds	High assists	Location Attendance	Record
9	November 2	@ San Antonio	W 112–92	Klay Thompson (27)	Curry, Durant (8)	Draymond Green (6)	AT&T Center; 18,418	6–3
10	November 4	@ Denver	W 127–108	Kevin Durant (25)	Omri Casspi (8)	Stephen Curry (11)	Pepsi Center; 19,711	7–3
11	November 6	Miami	W 97–80	Kevin Durant (21)	Draymond Green (9)	Kevin Durant (6)	Oracle Arena; 19,596	8–3
12	November 8	Minnesota	W 125–101	Klay Thompson (28)	Stephen Curry (8)	Stephen Curry (8)	Oracle Arena; 19,596	9–3
13	November 11	Philadelphia	W 135–114	Kevin Durant (29)	Draymond Green (10)	Stephen Curry (9)	Oracle Arena; 19,596	10–3
14	November 13	Orlando	W 110–100	Kevin Durant (21)	David West (11)	Kevin Durant (8)	Oracle Arena; 19,596	11–3
15	November 16	@ Boston	L 88–92	Kevin Durant (24)	Green, Casspi (8)	Curry, Green (5)	TD Garden; 18,624	11–4
16	November 18	@ Philadelphia	W 124–116	Stephen Curry (35)	Green, West (7)	Draymond Green (8)	Wells Fargo Center; 20,848	12–4
17	November 19	@ Brooklyn	W 118–111	Stephen Curry (39)	Stephen Curry (11)	Draymond Green (8)	Barclays Center; 17,732	13–4
18	November 22	@ Oklahoma City	L 91–108	Stephen Curry (24)	Omri Casspi (6)	Curry, Green (6)	Chesapeake Energy Arena; 18,203	13–5
19	November 24	Chicago	W 143–94	Stephen Curry (33)	Stephen Curry (7)	Zaza Pachulia (6)	Oracle Arena; 19,596	14–5
20	November 25	New Orleans	W 110–95	Stephen Curry (27)	Draymond Green (7)	Draymond Green (8)	Oracle Arena; 19,596	15–5
21	November 27	Sacramento	L 106–110	Klay Thompson (21)	David West (7)	Draymond Green (8)	Oracle Arena; 19,596	15–6
22	November 29	@ L.A. Lakers	W 127–123 (OT)	Kevin Durant (29)	Draymond Green (11)	Draymond Green (9)	Staples Center; 18,997	16–6

December : 13–2 (home: 7–2; road: 6–0)

Game	Date	Team	Score	High points	High rebounds	High assists	Location Attendance	Record
23	December 1	@ Orlando	W 133–112	Klay Thompson (27)	Zaza Pachulia (8)	Curry, Green (10)	Amway Center; 18,846	17–6
24	December 3	@ Miami	W 123–95	Stephen Curry (30)	Draymond Green (7)	Draymond Green (9)	American Airlines Arena; 19,600	18–6
25	December 4	@ New Orleans	W 125–115	Stephen Curry (31)	Draymond Green (9)	Stephen Curry (11)	Smoothie King Center; 17,004	19–6
26	December 6	@ Charlotte	W 101–87	Kevin Durant (35)	Kevin Durant (11)	Kevin Durant (10)	Spectrum Center; 19,334	20–6
27	December 8	@ Detroit	W 102–98	Kevin Durant (36)	Kevin Durant (10)	Draymond Green (13)	Little Caesars Arena; 20,491	21–6
28	December 11	Portland	W 111–104	Kevin Durant (28)	Casspi, Durant (9)	Durant, Iguodala (5)	Oracle Arena; 19,596	22–6
29	December 14	Dallas	W 112–97	Kevin Durant (36)	Casspi, Durant (11)	Andre Iguodala (10)	Oracle Arena; 19,596	23–6
30	December 18	@ L.A. Lakers	W 116–114 (OT)	Kevin Durant (36)	Kevin Durant (11)	Kevin Durant (8)	Staples Center; 18,997	24–6
31	December 20	Memphis	W 97–84	Klay Thompson (29)	Durant, McCaw (8)	Bell, Thompson (5)	Oracle Arena; 19,596	25–6
32	December 22	L.A. Lakers	W 113–106	Kevin Durant (33)	Draymond Green (11)	Durant, Green (7)	Oracle Arena; 19,596	26–6
33	December 23	Denver	L 81–96	Kevin Durant (18)	Jordan Bell (10)	Andre Iguodala (7)	Oracle Arena; 19,596	26–7
34	December 25	Cleveland	W 99–92	Kevin Durant (25)	Draymond Green (12)	Draymond Green (11)	Oracle Arena; 19,596	27–7
35	December 27	Utah	W 126–101	Kevin Durant (21)	Jordan Bell (13)	Draymond Green (8)	Oracle Arena; 19,596	28–7
36	December 29	Charlotte	L 100–111	Kevin Durant (27)	Draymond Green (11)	Draymond Green (16)	Oracle Arena; 19,596	28–8
37	December 30	Memphis	W 141–128	Stephen Curry (38)	David West (11)	Kevin Durant (9)	Oracle Arena; 19,596	29–8

January : 11–3 (home: 4–1; road: 7–2)

Game	Date	Team	Score	High points	High rebounds	High assists	Location Attendance	Record
38	January 3	@ Dallas	W 125–122	Stephen Curry (32)	Kevin Durant (12)	Stephen Curry (8)	American Airlines Center; 20,212	30–8
39	January 4	@ Houston	W 124–114	Stephen Curry (29)	Draymond Green (14)	Draymond Green (10)	Toyota Center; 18,055	31–8
40	January 6	@ L.A. Clippers	W 121–105	Stephen Curry (45)	Draymond Green (12)	Green, Iguodala (7)	Staples Center; 19,068	32–8
41	January 8	Denver	W 124–114	Stephen Curry (32)	Jordan Bell (8)	Draymond Green (10)	Oracle Arena; 19,596	33–8
42	January 10	L.A. Clippers	L 106–125	Kevin Durant (40)	Draymond Green (10)	Durant, Green, Livingston (4)	Oracle Arena; 19,596	33–9
43	January 12	@ Milwaukee	W 108–94	Kevin Durant (26)	Draymond Green (10)	Draymond Green (7)	Bradley Center; 18,717	34–9
44	January 13	@ Toronto	W 127–125	Klay Thompson (26)	Curry, Durant (6)	Stephen Curry (9)	Air Canada Centre; 20,078	35–9
45	January 15	@ Cleveland	W 118–108	Kevin Durant (32)	Draymond Green (16)	Draymond Green (9)	Quicken Loans Arena; 20,562	36–9
46	January 17	@ Chicago	W 119–112	Klay Thompson (38)	Zaza Pachulia (11)	Kevin Durant (7)	United Center; 21,372	37–9
47	January 20	@ Houston	L 108–116	Kevin Durant (26)	Durant, Green (7)	Stephen Curry (8)	Toyota Center; 18,055	37–10
48	January 23	New York	W 123–112	Stephen Curry (32)	Kevin Durant (14)	Stephen Curry (6)	Oracle Arena; 19,596	38–10
49	January 25	Minnesota	W 126–113	Kevin Durant (28)	Kevin Durant (10)	Kevin Durant (11)	Oracle Arena; 19,596	39–10
50	January 27	Boston	W 109–105	Stephen Curry (49)	Draymond Green (11)	Curry, Green (5)	Oracle Arena; 19,596	40–10
51	January 30	@ Utah	L 99–129	Stephen Curry (26)	Kevin Durant (11)	Draymond Green (8)	Vivint Smart Home Arena; 19,911	40–11

February : 8–3 (home: 5–1; road: 3–2)

Game	Date	Team	Score	High points	High rebounds	High assists	Location Attendance	Record
52	February 2	@ Sacramento	W 119–104	Kevin Durant (33)	Zaza Pachulia (13)	Curry, Durant, Green (6)	Golden 1 Center; 16,583	41–11
53	February 3	@ Denver	L 108–115	Kevin Durant (31)	Zaza Pachulia (8)	Draymond Green (8)	Pepsi Center; 20,103	41–12
54	February 6	Oklahoma City	L 105–125	Kevin Durant (33)	Draymond Green (8)	Draymond Green (7)	Oracle Arena; 19,596	41–13
55	February 8	Dallas	W 121–103	Kevin Durant (24)	Draymond Green (10)	Stephen Curry (8)	Oracle Arena; 19,596	42–13
56	February 10	San Antonio	W 122–105	Klay Thompson (25)	Draymond Green (8)	Draymond Green (11)	Oracle Arena; 19,596	43–13
57	February 12	Phoenix	W 129–83	Stephen Curry (22)	Omri Casspi (10)	Stephen Curry (7)	Oracle Arena; 19,596	44–13
58	February 14	@ Portland	L 117–123	Kevin Durant (50)	Draymond Green (12)	Draymond Green (7)	Moda Center; 19,520	44–14
All-Star Break
59	February 22	L.A. Clippers	W 134–127	Stephen Curry (44)	Draymond Green (8)	Stephen Curry (10)	Oracle Arena; 19,596	45–14
60	February 24	Oklahoma City	W 112–80	Kevin Durant (28)	Stephen Curry (9)	Draymond Green (8)	Oracle Arena; 19,596	46–14
61	February 26	@ New York	W 125–111	Klay Thompson (26)	Kevin Durant (9)	Draymond Green (6)	Madison Square Garden; 19,812	47–14
62	February 28	@ Washington	W 109–101	Kevin Durant (32)	Andre Iguodala (7)	Draymond Green (11)	Capital One Arena; 20,356	48–14

March : 7–7 (home: 4–4; road: 3–3)

Game	Date	Team	Score	High points	High rebounds	High assists	Location Attendance	Record
63	March 2	@ Atlanta	W 114–109	Curry, Durant (28)	Draymond Green (7)	Draymond Green (9)	Philips Arena; 16,728	49–14
64	March 6	Brooklyn	W 114–101	Stephen Curry (34)	Curry, Durant, Iguodala (6)	Draymond Green (9)	Oracle Arena; 19,596	50–14
65	March 8	San Antonio	W 110–107	Kevin Durant (37)	Draymond Green (12)	Draymond Green (10)	Oracle Arena; 19,596	51–14
66	March 9	@ Portland	L 108–125	Kevin Durant (40)	Draymond Green (12)	Durant, Green (6)	Moda Center; 19,487	51–15
67	March 11	@ Minnesota	L 103–109	Kevin Durant (39)	Kevin Durant (12)	Draymond Green (7)	Target Center; 18,978	51–16
68	March 14	LA Lakers	W 117–106	Kevin Durant (26)	Zaza Pachulia (12)	Kevin Durant (6)	Oracle Arena; 19,596	52–16
69	March 16	Sacramento	L 93–98	Quinn Cook (25)	Draymond Green (10)	Draymond Green (7)	Oracle Arena; 19,596	52–17
70	March 17	@ Phoenix	W 124–109	Quinn Cook (28)	Draymond Green (11)	Draymond Green (8)	Talking Stick Resort Arena; 18,055	53–17
71	March 19	@ San Antonio	L 75–89	Quinn Cook (20)	Kevon Looney (8)	Quinn Cook (5)	AT&T Center; 18,418	53–18
72	March 23	Atlanta	W 106–94	Stephen Curry (29)	Zaza Pachulia (9)	Cook, Iguodala (6)	Oracle Arena; 19,596	54–18
73	March 25	Utah	L 91–110	Quinn Cook (17)	JaVale McGee (9)	Quinn Cook (8)	Oracle Arena; 19,596	54–19
74	March 27	Indiana	L 81–92	Nick Young (12)	Kevon Looney (11)	Quinn Cook (7)	Oracle Arena; 19,596	54–20
75	March 29	Milwaukee	L 107–116	Quinn Cook (30)	Green, Iguodala (5)	Durant, Green (6)	Oracle Arena; 19,596	54–21
76	March 31	@ Sacramento	W 112–96	Kevin Durant (27)	Kevin Durant (10)	Draymond Green (7)	Golden 1 Center; 17,583	55–21

April : 3–3 (home: 1–1; road: 2–2)

Game	Date	Team	Score	High points	High rebounds	High assists	Location Attendance	Record
77	April 1	Phoenix	W 117–107	Kevin Durant (29)	Kevin Durant (11)	Draymond Green (12)	Oracle Arena; 19,596	56–21
78	April 3	@ Oklahoma City	W 111–107	Kevin Durant (34)	Kevin Durant (10)	Draymond Green (8)	Chesapeake Energy Arena; 18,203	57–21
79	April 5	@ Indiana	L 106–126	Kevin Durant (27)	Klay Thompson (7)	Kevin Durant (7)	Bankers Life Fieldhouse; 17,923	57–22
80	April 7	New Orleans	L 120–126	Kevin Durant (41)	Durant, Green (10)	Draymond Green (9)	Oracle Arena; 19,596	57–23
81	April 8	@ Phoenix	W 117–100	Klay Thompson (34)	Cook, Green, Looney (6)	Kevin Durant (9)	Talking Stick Resort Arena; 18,055	58–23
82	April 10	@ Utah	L 79–119	Klay Thompson (23)	Zaza Pachulia (6)	Shaun Livingston (4)	Vivint Smart Home Arena; 18,306	58–24

2017–18 season schedule

=== Playoffs ===
2018 playoff game log
Total: 16–5 (Home: 10–1; Road: 6–4)
First Round: 4–1 (home: 3–0; road: 1–1)

Game	Date	Team	Score	High points	High rebounds	High assists	Location Attendance	Series
1	April 14	San Antonio	W 113–92	Klay Thompson (27)	Durant, Green (8)	Draymond Green (11)	Oracle Arena; 19,596	1–0
2	April 16	San Antonio	W 116–101	Kevin Durant (32)	Iguodala, McGee (7)	Durant, Green (6)	Oracle Arena; 19,596	2–0
3	April 19	@ San Antonio	W 110–97	Kevin Durant (26)	Kevin Durant (9)	Draymond Green (7)	AT&T Center; 18,418	3–0
4	April 22	@ San Antonio	L 90–103	Kevin Durant (34)	Draymond Green (18)	Draymond Green (9)	AT&T Center; 18,418	3–1
5	April 24	San Antonio	W 99–91	Kevin Durant (25)	Draymond Green (19)	Draymond Green (7)	Oracle Arena; 19,596	4–1

Conference Semifinals: 4–1 (home: 3–0; road: 1–1)

Game	Date	Team	Score	High points	High rebounds	High assists	Location Attendance	Series
1	April 28	New Orleans	W 123–101	Klay Thompson (27)	Draymond Green (15)	Draymond Green (11)	Oracle Arena; 19,596	1–0
2	May 1	New Orleans	W 121–116	Kevin Durant (29)	Draymond Green (9)	Draymond Green (12)	Oracle Arena; 19,596	2–0
3	May 4	@ New Orleans	L 100–119	Klay Thompson (26)	Draymond Green (12)	Draymond Green (9)	Smoothie King Center; 18,551	2–1
4	May 6	@ New Orleans	W 118–92	Kevin Durant (38)	Durant, Green (9)	Draymond Green (9)	Smoothie King Center; 18,513	3–1
5	May 8	New Orleans	W 113–104	Stephen Curry (28)	Draymond Green (14)	Draymond Green (9)	Oracle Arena; 19,596	4–1

Conference Finals: 4–3 (home: 2–1; road: 2–2)

Game	Date	Team	Score	High points	High rebounds	High assists	Location Attendance	Series
1	May 14	@ Houston	W 119–106	Kevin Durant (37)	Draymond Green (9)	Draymond Green (9)	Toyota Center; 18,055	1–0
2	May 16	@ Houston	L 105–127	Kevin Durant (38)	Stephen Curry (7)	Stephen Curry (7)	Toyota Center; 18,119	1–1
3	May 20	Houston	W 126–85	Stephen Curry (35)	Draymond Green (17)	Durant, Green (6)	Oracle Arena; 19,596	2–1
4	May 22	Houston	L 92–95	Stephen Curry (28)	Draymond Green (14)	Draymond Green (8)	Oracle Arena; 19,596	2–2
5	May 24	@ Houston	L 94–98	Kevin Durant (29)	Draymond Green (15)	Stephen Curry (6)	Toyota Center; 18,208	2–3
6	May 26	Houston	W 115–86	Klay Thompson (35)	Draymond Green (10)	Draymond Green (9)	Oracle Arena; 19,596	3–3
7	May 28	@ Houston	W 101–92	Kevin Durant (34)	Draymond Green (13)	Stephen Curry (10)	Toyota Center; 18,055	4–3

NBA Finals: 4–0 (home: 2–0; road: 2–0)

Game	Date	Team	Score	High points	High rebounds	High assists	Location Attendance	Series
1	May 31	Cleveland	W 124–114 (OT)	Stephen Curry (29)	Draymond Green (11)	Curry, Green (9)	Oracle Arena; 19,596	1–0
2	June 3	Cleveland	W 122–103	Stephen Curry (33)	Kevin Durant (9)	Stephen Curry (8)	Oracle Arena; 19,596	2–0
3	June 6	@ Cleveland	W 110–102	Kevin Durant (43)	Kevin Durant (13)	Draymond Green (9)	Quicken Loans Arena; 20,562	3–0
4	June 8	@ Cleveland	W 108–85	Stephen Curry (37)	Kevin Durant (12)	Kevin Durant (10)	Quicken Loans Arena; 20,562	4–0

2018 playoff schedule

== Player statistics ==
Legend
GP	Games played	GS	Games started	MPG	Minutes per game
FG%	Field-goal percentage	3P%	3-point field-goal percentage	FT%	Free-throw percentage
RPG	Rebounds per game	APG	Assists per game	SPG	Steals per game
BPG	Blocks per game	PPG	Points per game

=== Regular season ===
Player	GP	GS	MPG	FG%	3P%	FT%	RPG	APG	SPG	BPG	PPG
Stephen Curry	51	51	32.0	.495	.423	.921	5.1	6.1	1.6	.2	26.4
Kevin Durant	68	68	34.2	.516	.419	.889	6.8	5.4	.7	1.8	26.4
Klay Thompson	73	73	34.3	.488	.440	.837	3.8	2.5	.8	.5	20.0
Draymond Green	70	70	32.7	.454	.301	.775	7.6	7.3	1.4	1.3	11.0
Nick Young	80	8	17.4	.412	.377	.862	1.6	.5	.5	.1	7.3
David West	73	0	13.7	.571	.375	.759	3.3	1.9	.6	1.0	6.8
Andre Iguodala	64	7	25.3	.463	.282	.632	3.8	3.3	.8	.6	6.0
Shaun Livingston	71	7	15.9	.501	.000	.820	1.8	2.0	.5	.3	5.5
Zaza Pachulia	69	57	14.1	.564	.000	.806	4.7	1.6	.6	.2	5.4
JaVale McGee	65	17	9.5	.621	.000	.731	2.6	.5	.3	.9	4.8
Jordan Bell	57	13	14.2	.627	.000	.682	3.6	1.8	.6	1.0	4.6
Patrick McCaw	57	10	16.9	.409	.238	.765	1.4	1.4	.8	.2	4.0
Kevon Looney	66	4	13.8	.580	.200	.545	3.3	.6	.5	.8	4.0
Damian Jones	15	0	5.9	.500	–	.600	.9	.1	.1	.2	1.7
Chris Boucher	1	0	1.0	.000	.000	–	1.0	.0	.0	.0	.0
Quinn Cook ^{≠}	33	18	22.4	.484	.442	.880	2.5	2.7	.4	.0	9.5
Omri Casspi ^{‡}	53	7	14.0	.580	.455	.725	3.8	1.0	.3	.4	5.7

After all games.
^{‡} Waived during the season
^{†} Traded during the season
^{≠} Acquired during the season

=== Playoffs ===
Player	GP	GS	MPG	FG%	3P%	FT%	RPG	APG	SPG	BPG	PPG
Kevin Durant	21	21	38.4	.487	.341	.901	7.8	4.7	.7	1.2	29.0
Stephen Curry	15	14	37.0	.451	.395	.957	6.1	5.4	1.7	.7	25.5
Klay Thompson	21	21	37.8	.465	.427	.871	4.1	1.8	.8	.3	19.6
Draymond Green	21	21	39.0	.432	.266	.796	10.6	8.1	2.0	1.5	10.8
Andre Iguodala	15	12	26.7	.494	.378	.706	4.5	2.7	1.4	.5	8.1
Shaun Livingston	21	0	17.2	.536	.000	.880	2.2	1.5	.3	.0	6.7
JaVale McGee	13	9	12.2	.672	.000	.667	3.2	.3	.2	.8	6.5
Quinn Cook	17	0	10.3	.448	.226	.824	1.4	.6	.2	.1	4.8
Kevon Looney	21	5	18.4	.542	.000	.381	4.2	.9	.7	.4	4.1
David West	18	0	9.7	.600	.500	1.000	2.1	1.8	.3	.6	3.3
Nick Young	20	2	10.3	.302	.298	.750	.6	.2	.1	.0	2.6
Jordan Bell	17	0	10.2	.531	.000	.500	2.8	.9	.4	.5	2.4
Zaza Pachulia	7	0	3.7	.571	–	.750	1.7	.1	.4	.1	2.4
Damian Jones	4	0	2.8	.500	–	.667	.8	.0	.0	.0	1.0
Patrick McCaw	6	0	2.7	.500	.000	1.000	.5	.0	.3	.0	.7

== Transactions ==
=== Trades ===
June 22, 2017	To Golden State Warriors • Draft rights to (United States) Jordan Bell	To Chicago Bulls • Cash considerations

=== Free agency ===
==== Re-signed ====
Player	Signed
(United States) Stephen Curry	5-year contract worth $201 million
(United States) Shaun Livingston	3-year contract worth $24 million
(United States) David West	1-year contract worth $2.3 million
(United States) Andre Iguodala	3-year contract worth $48 million
(United States) Kevin Durant	2-year contract worth $53 million
(Georgia (country)) Zaza Pachulia	1-year contract worth $3.5 million
(United States) JaVale McGee	1-year contract worth $2.1 million

==== Additions ====
Player	Signed	Former team
(United States) Nick Young	1-year contract worth $5.2 million	Los Angeles Lakers
(Israel) Omri Casspi	1-year contract worth $2.1 million	Minnesota Timberwolves
(Canada) Chris Boucher	Two-way contract	Oregon Ducks (Undrafted)
(United States) Quinn Cook	Two-way contract	New Orleans Pelicans

==== Subtractions ====
Player	Reason left	New team
(United States) Ian Clark	1-year contract worth $1.6 million	New Orleans Pelicans
(United States) James Michael McAdoo	Two-way contract	Philadelphia 76ers
(United States) Matt Barnes	NBA Retirement	
(Israel) Omri Casspi	Waived	—N/a

== Awards ==
Recipient	Award	Date awarded	Ref.
(United States) Kevin Durant	Western Conference Player of the Week	December 11, 2017	
(United States) Steve Kerr	Western Conference Coach of the Month (December)	January 3, 2018	
(United States) Stephen Curry	Western Conference Player of the Week	January 8, 2018	
(United States) Stephen Curry	Western Conference Player of the Week	January 29, 2018	
(United States) Stephen Curry	Western Conference Player of the Month (January)	February 1, 2018	
(United States) Kevin Durant	Finals Most Valuable Player	June 8, 2018	
