= Kevon Looney =

American basketball player (born 1996)

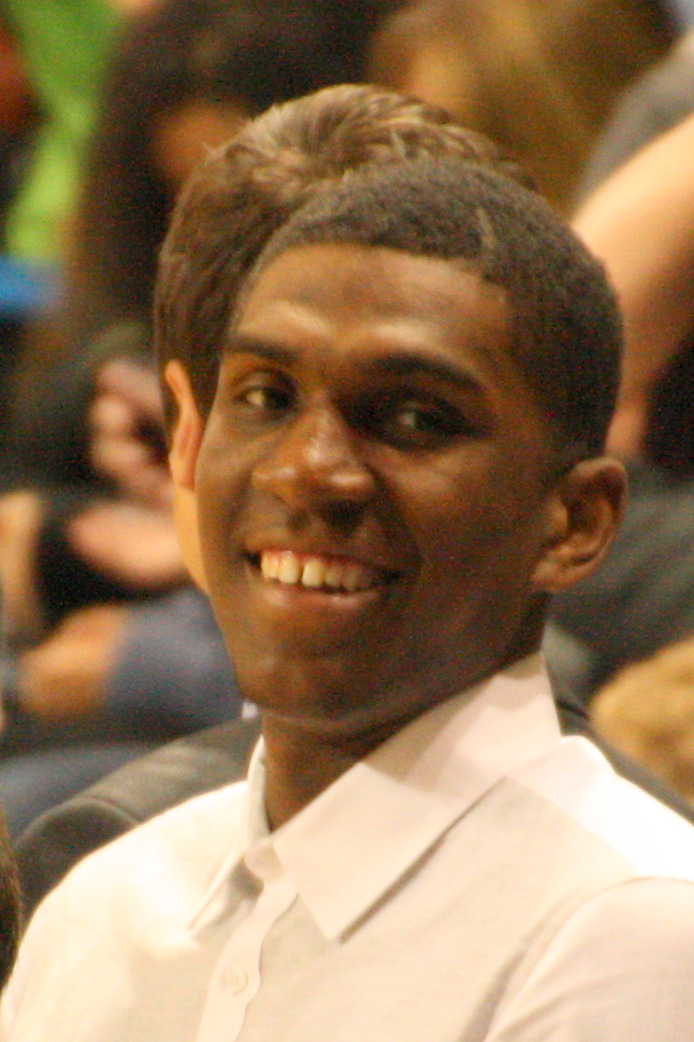
- Looney in 2016

No. 55 – Los Angeles Lakers
- Position: Center
- League: NBA

Personal information
- Born: February 6, 1996 (age 30) Milwaukee, Wisconsin, U.S.
- Listed height: 6 ft 9 in (2.06 m)
- Listed weight: 222 lb (101 kg)

Career information
- High school: Alexander Hamilton (Milwaukee, Wisconsin)
- College: UCLA (2014–2015)
- NBA draft: 2015: 1st round, 30th overall pick
- Drafted by: Golden State Warriors
- Playing career: 2015–present

Career history
- 2015–2025: Golden State Warriors
- 2016–2017: →Santa Cruz Warriors
- 2025–2026: New Orleans Pelicans
- 2026–present: Los Angeles Lakers

Career highlights
- 3× NBA champion (2017, 2018, 2022); Second-team All-Pac-12 (2015); Pac-12 All-Freshman team (2015); McDonald's All-American (2014); First-team Parade All-American (2014); Wisconsin Mr. Basketball (2014)
- Stats at NBA.com
- Stats at Basketball Reference

Kevon Grant Looney (/kɛˈvɪn/ kə-VON; born February 6, 1996) is an American professional basketball player for the Los Angeles Lakers of the National Basketball Association (NBA). As a freshman playing college basketball with the UCLA Bruins, he earned second-team all-conference honors in the Pac-12 in 2015. After the season, Looney decided to forgo his college eligibility and enter the 2015 NBA draft, and was selected in the first round by the Golden State Warriors with the 30th overall pick. He won three NBA championships during his 10-year tenure with the Warriors.

Growing up in Wisconsin, Looney was named the top high school player in the state as a senior in 2014. He also received national recognition as a five-star prospect and earned All-American honors. In his only season at UCLA, Looney led all freshmen in the nation in double-doubles, recording double figures in both points and rebounds in 15 games. One of the top players in the Pac-12, he was also named to their all-freshman team. As a rookie with Golden State, Looney's playing time was limited after undergoing surgery on both his hips. The next season, a strained left hip sidelined him for most of the playoffs during their championship run. Finally healthy in 2017–18, Looney became a regular in the Warriors' rotation as an undersized center, helping them win a second straight championship. Looney won a third championship with Golden State in 2022 as their starting center. After ten seasons with the Warriors, Looney signed with the New Orleans Pelicans in 2025.

== Early life ==
Looney was born in Milwaukee, Wisconsin, to Doug and Victoria Looney. Growing up, he was coached by his father, who played as a forward at Schreiner University in Kerrville, Texas, and became the school's career rebounding leader. Looney also watched his brother Kevin, who was six years older, play pickup games. Like his brother, Looney became a Los Angeles Lakers and Kobe Bryant fan, and watched tapes of Bryant, copying his moves. His brother would let him play basketball with him, but only if Kevon rebounded more and shot less.

Looney was the best player on his high school team at Alexander Hamilton High in Milwaukee. Looney was already being recruited by colleges as a freshman, receiving offers from in-state schools Marquette and Wisconsin. In his sophomore year in 2012, Looney was named Player of the Year of the Milwaukee City Conference after averaging 20.9 points, 8.6 rebounds, and 2.0 assists per game. As a junior, he averaged 26.1 points, 12.4 rebounds, 7.0 blocks, and 3.1 assists per game, leading a team of mostly unproven players to a runner-up finish for the conference title.

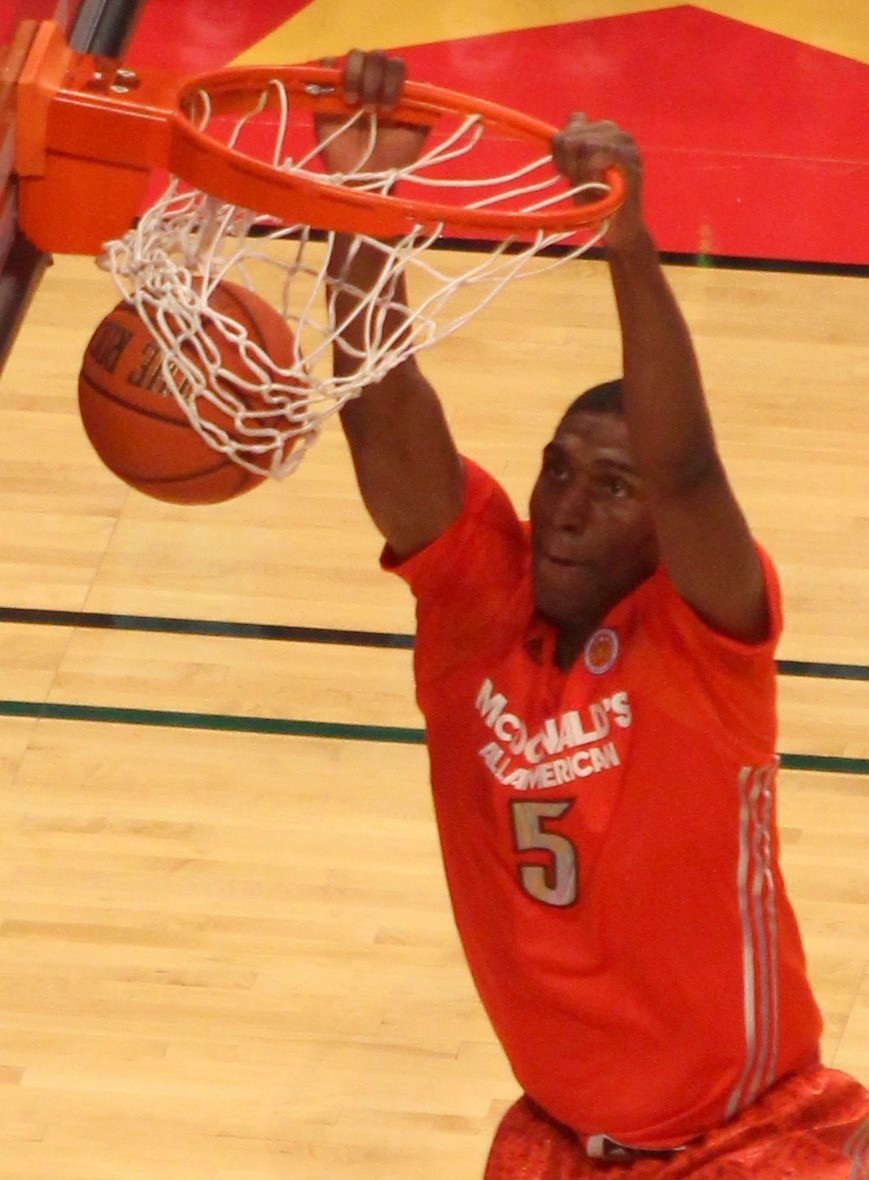
Looney in the 2014 McDonald's All-American Game

In his final season, Looney averaged 27.9 points, 12.7 rebounds, 7.0 assists, and 8.0 blocks per game; both CBS Sports and The Post-Crescent called his averages "nearly" a quadruple-double. Although Looney was Hamilton's tallest player, he was also their best passer, and played mostly at point guard. Capable of handling the ball, creating his own shot, and shooting, mixtapes on YouTube hailed Looney as "the next KD", in reference to future Golden State teammate Kevin Durant. Hamilton went undefeated in conference play to win its first league title in four years, and Looney earned his second City Conference player of the year award. Looney gained national recognition, becoming just the second player in Milwaukee Public Schools history, and the sixth ever in Wisconsin, to be named a McDonald's All-American; he was also a Parade All-American. Looney was named Wisconsin Mr. Basketball by the Wisconsin Basketball Coaches Association, and both Gatorade and the Associated Press named him their state player of the year. Looney was listed as a five-star prospect by Rivals.com, ESPN.com and Scout.com, who ranked him nationally as the No. 10, No. 12, and No. 15 player, respectively.

Hamilton retired Looney's No. 5 in 2018. He considered changing his number when he was a sophomore, but Looney's close friend Wati Majeed talked him out of it: "You're No. 5, that's who you are. You can play all five positions and guard all five positions."

== College career ==
Looney announced on Halloween in 2013 his decision to attend the University of California, Los Angeles (UCLA). No recruiting analysts at 247Sports.com had predicted his decision, which was a secret to everyone, including his parents. Looney liked California and called UCLA the "most beautiful campus I had ever seen." He was impressed with Bruins coach Steve Alford's vision for the team. The Bruins did not guarantee Looney a feature role as a freshman, but sold to him that Looney would be allowed to play both inside and outside and show his versatility, much like Kyle Anderson did for the school in 2013–14.

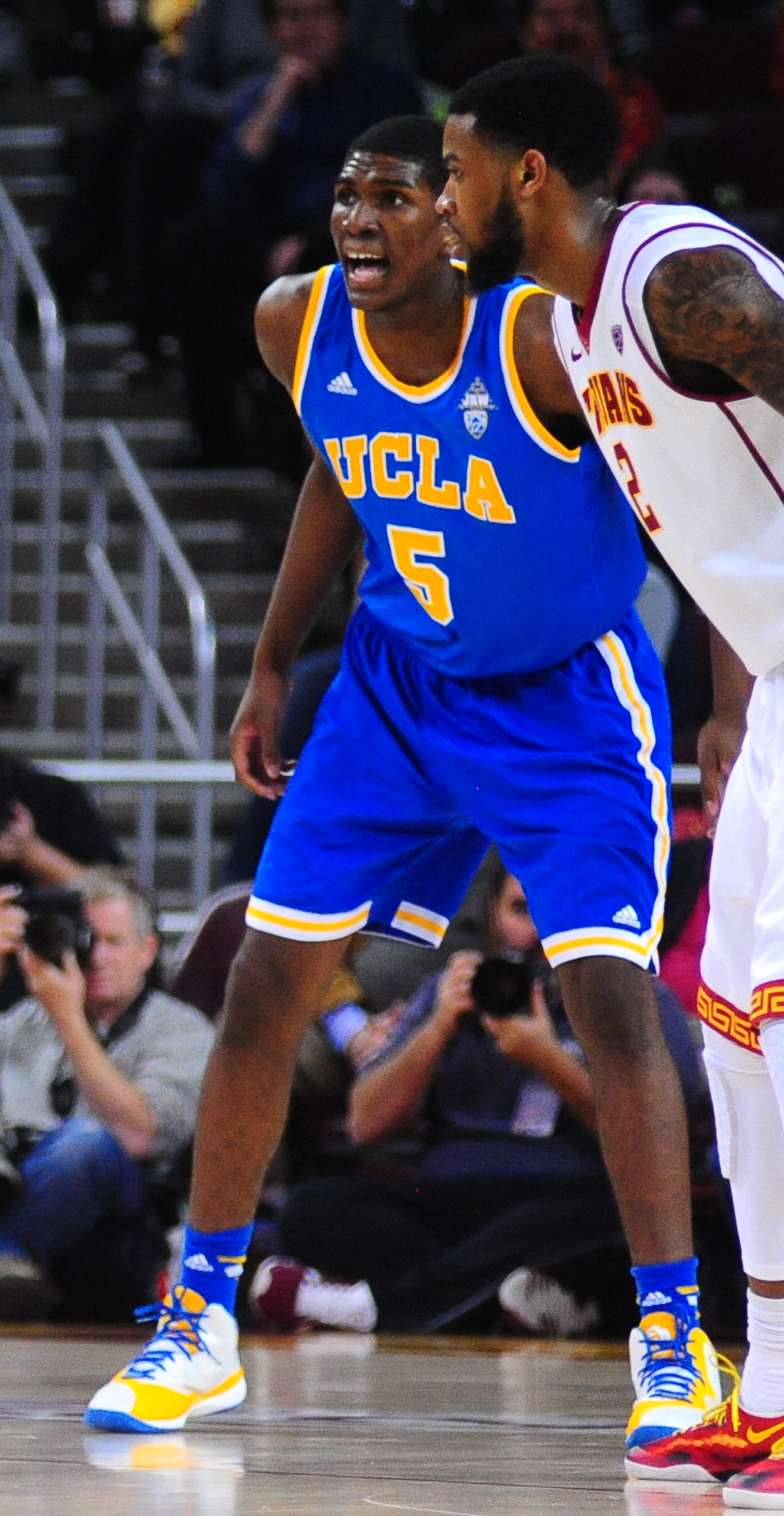
Looney as a UCLA freshman on defense against USC

Upon his arrival at UCLA over the summer before his freshman season, Looney suffered a hip injury while playing in the gym. Bruins guard Isaac Hamilton shot the ball and fell into the right leg of Looney, who was positioning to rebound the ball. He rested for two to three weeks before the season. Looney did not miss a practice or game all year, but the injury hampered his lateral movement and speed. Looney avoided changing directions, and played more like a lumbering big man. Playing power forward for the Bruins, he was one of the top freshmen in the country in 2014–15. During the season opener, Looney debuted with 20 points, nine rebounds, and three assists in a 113–78 win over Montana State. CBS Sports called his performance "one of the more impressive freshman debuts in UCLA's rich history." Looney followed up with double-doubles in his next four games, and became the first freshman in UCLA history with at least four double-doubles in his first five games. (Note: Looney had earlier become the fourth UCLA freshman in the past 22 years with a double-double in either of his first two games. The first three were Charles O'Bannon, Kevin Love, and Kyle Anderson. Looney later became the first Bruins freshman with two double-doubles in his first three games. In 2018, Moses Brown became the first freshman with a double-double in his first three games.) Soon, pundits began projecting Looney as a freshman lottery pick should he decide to enter the National Basketball Association (NBA). Looney had seven double-doubles in the Bruins' first 10 games, before scoring in double digits just once during a five-game losing streak for UCLA, which included an 0–2 start to their Pac-12 Conference schedule. Looney helped the team end their streak with career highs of 27 points and 19 rebounds in an 86–81 double-overtime win over Stanford. He was one of 14 players named to the United States Basketball Writers Association (USBWA)'s mid-season watchlist for the Wayman Tisdale Award, presented annually to the nation's top freshman. Looney was also one of 16 finalists for the inaugural Karl Malone Award, given to the top power forward in Division I men's basketball.

UCLA rarely called plays for Looney, and his scoring typically came off putbacks, fast breaks, and open shots. A natural rebounder, Looney's shooting improved as the season progressed. After making just nine of 28 of his three-point field goals in the first 24 games, Looney was 11 of 17 in the last seven games of the regular season. Still his scoring tapered off, with only one game over 15 points since his career-game at Stanford. In the 2015 Pac-12 tournament, Looney exited mid-game after he took an arm to his left cheek during UCLA's quarterfinal win over USC. He was a game-time decision to play the next day against Arizona, when Looney was cleared and fitted with a protective mask 90 minutes before the contest. Though impaired by the mask, Looney played 30 minutes but was limited, finishing below his season averages with only five points and four rebounds. The Bruins lost 70–64, but the close match helped them secure a bid into the 2015 NCAA tournament. Looney continued to play wearing the mask as UCLA advanced to the Sweet 16 for the second straight season.

For the season, Looney averaged 11.6 points and led the team with 9.2 rebounds per game, finishing with 15 double-doubles. Among all freshmen nationally, his double-doubles led the nation and his rebounding ranked second. Looney's rebounds and double-doubles ranked second among all players in the Pac-12. He made 47.0 percent of his field goals, and 41.5 percent from three-point range. Looney was voted second-team All-Pac-12, and named to the Pac-12 All-Freshman Team. He was also named second-team all-district by the National Association of Basketball Coaches (NABC).

== Professional career ==
=== Golden State Warriors (2015–2025) ===
==== Hip injuries and first championship (2015–2017) ====
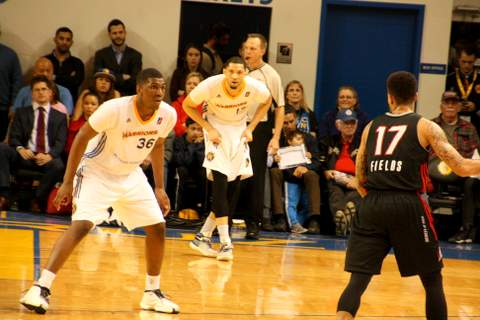
Looney (left) on assignment with Santa Cruz in 2016

After one season with UCLA, Looney decided to forgo his remaining college eligibility to declare for the 2015 NBA draft. However, his draft stock dropped over concerns with his hip. ESPN.com reported on the morning of the draft that Looney had undergone surgery on his hip before the 2014–15 season and that "he probably misses the [following] season" but Looney's camp denied he had any procedure done. Looney had also heard that some teams did not think his success at UCLA would translate to the NBA and some executives and scouts did not believe he played hard enough. One of 19 players to attend the draft, Looney fell to the final pick of the first round, where he was chosen 30th overall by the Golden State Warriors. The Warriors, who had recently won the 2015 NBA Finals, said they had no evidence Looney required any further treatment. Nonetheless, they were comfortable with any recovery time that he might need, given his age, potential and the team's established core lineup.

On July 8, 2015, Looney signed his rookie scale contract with the Warriors, and played on their Las Vegas Summer League team. On August 20, Looney underwent a successful right hip arthroscopy to repair a torn labrum.

On January 4, 2016, Looney was assigned to the Santa Cruz Warriors, Golden State's D-League affiliate, after being cleared to practice after rehab from his surgery. Looney made his professional debut on January 12 with Santa Cruz, logging a double-double with 11 points and 12 rebounds in 16 minutes against the Idaho Stampede. On January 24, Looney was recalled by Golden State after averaging 8.0 points and 10.0 rebounds in 18.2 minutes over five games. Three days later against the Dallas Mavericks, he was activated for the first time due to an injury to big man Festus Ezeli. Looney made his NBA debut that evening, becoming the 11th former UCLA player to play for the Warriors. Looney scored on his first attempt and finished with two points and two rebounds in a 127–107 victory and was given the game ball after the game. Golden State had Looney continue working on his conditioning, and Looney received multiple assignments to Santa Cruz.

Looney suffered a setback in March, when he was sidelined by inflammation in his surgically repaired hip. The Warriors finished the regular season with an NBA-record 73 wins, breaking the previous mark of 72 set by the Chicago Bulls in 1995–96. On April 22, Looney underwent a successful arthroscopic surgery to repair a torn labrum on his left hip, which was expected to sideline him from four to six months. A similar procedure had been performed on his right hip eight months earlier. Looney finished his rookie year with five games played with Golden State and 12 in the D-League. The Warriors made the NBA Finals in 2016, but lost to the Cleveland Cavaliers in seven games despite a 3–1 lead.

Looney did not play in the 2016 Summer League while he continued to rehab. Unable to play most of the previous 15 months, Looney came to training camp overweight. During the preseason, he battled James Michael McAdoo to be the #5 forward on the Warriors' depth chart. Looney started the 2016–17 season strongly. On November 26, 2016, he made his first career start in place of an injured Draymond Green, recording six points, three rebounds, and two assists in 18 minutes of play in a 115–102 victory over the Minnesota Timberwolves. However, Looney grew ineffective in limited minutes and his playing time diminished. On January 13, 2017, Looney received a one-game assignment to Santa Cruz after an extended stretch of limited playing time. He was impressive in his D-League season debut, logging 18 points and 20 rebounds in 24 minutes. It was the first of three D-League stints for Looney during the season. Looney missed most of April due to a left hip strain. Golden State finished the regular season with a league-leading 67 wins and advanced to the NBA Finals, where they defeated Cleveland in five games to win their second championship in three years. Looney was inactive for all 17 playoff games, missing 12 due to his left hip.

==== Transition to center and second championship (2017–2018) ====
Healthy at last, Looney became a regular rotation player in 2017–18. He lost 30 pounds (14 kg) before the season after hiring a personal trainer over the summer, changing his training program, and adopting a modified Paleo diet. However, Looney was one of six centers on the team, behind starter Zaza Pachulia and veterans David West and JaVale McGee, while youngsters Jordan Bell and Damian Jones appeared to have brighter futures. On October 27, 2017, Looney had nine points on 4-of-4 shooting and five rebounds in a 120–117 victory over the Washington Wizards. Finally able to play extended minutes without being out of breath, he helped lead an 18-point second-half comeback after Green was ejected late in the second quarter. On October 31, Golden State did not exercise its fourth-year option on Looney for 2018–19 due to his contract's luxury tax impact on their payroll, making him an unrestricted free agent the following summer. Nonetheless, Looney began receiving regular playing time despite not having played in seven of the Warriors' first nine games. Golden State coach Steve Kerr said the league was shifting toward a small-ball, switching style of play, and he called Looney "our best switching [center]." On November 11, in a 135–114 victory over the Philadelphia 76ers, Looney had four points and three blocked shots with a plus–minus of +14 in 15 minutes while matched up mostly opposite Joel Embiid, one of the league's top centers. Looney's playing time in December dropped to seven minutes per game after the rookie Bell passed him on the depth chart. On January 4, 2018, against the Houston Rockets, Looney had seven points and tied his then-career high with eight rebounds in 15 minutes in a 124–114 victory. He played the final 6:30 of the game and was more effectively switching defensively on Rockets guard Chris Paul than Bell, who remained on the bench in the second half. After playing minimally and sitting out the last two games, Looney was praised by Kerr for being an "amazing example of what being a professional is about in this league." On January 12, Looney returned to his hometown and played a career-high 23 minutes while scoring nine points on a perfect 3-of-3 shooting with another eight rebounds, three assists and a block in a 108–94 victory over the Milwaukee Bucks. On March 17, Looney had career highs of 13 points and six blocks in a 124–109 victory over the Phoenix Suns. Ten days later, Looney recorded eight points and a career-best 11 rebounds off the bench in a 92–81 loss to the Indiana Pacers.

Playing in the first postseason of his career, Looney impressed with his defensive switching. The Warriors won the first round of the 2018 playoffs 4–1 over the San Antonio Spurs. McGee was the starting center, but Looney became Kerr's favorite, playing the most (100 minutes) of all the Warriors' big men. Looney guarded LaMarcus Aldridge well, and Kerr praised his defense and ability to switch onto Spurs guards Patty Mills and Manu Ginóbili on pick and rolls. Looney was steadier than Bell, and former starter Pachulia did not receive any playing time the entire series. Golden State won the conference semifinals 4–1 over the New Orleans Pelicans. During the series, Looney emerged as the team's most dependable center, defending Anthony Davis adequately. In the final two games, Looney became the Warriors' sixth man after the team went small and started their Hamptons Five lineup with Green at center. Against the Rockets in the Western Conference Finals, Looney provided solid defense against guards Paul and James Harden. Looney moved into the starting lineup in Game 4 after forward Andre Iguodala was sidelined with a leg contusion. Looney started the final four games of the series, and the Warriors defeated Houston 4–3 to advance to the Finals for a rematch against Cleveland. The Warriors swept the Cavaliers 4–0 for their second straight championship. Looney started in Game 1 before being supplanted in Game 2 by McGee. Looney played 39 minutes in the four games, but only three minutes in the last two after Iguodala returned. Looney finished the playoffs playing the sixth-most minutes (387) on the Warriors and the most among their six centers. Golden State had a 97.5 defensive rating with Looney playing, the best of all their rotation players.

==== Three-peat chase (2018–2019) ====
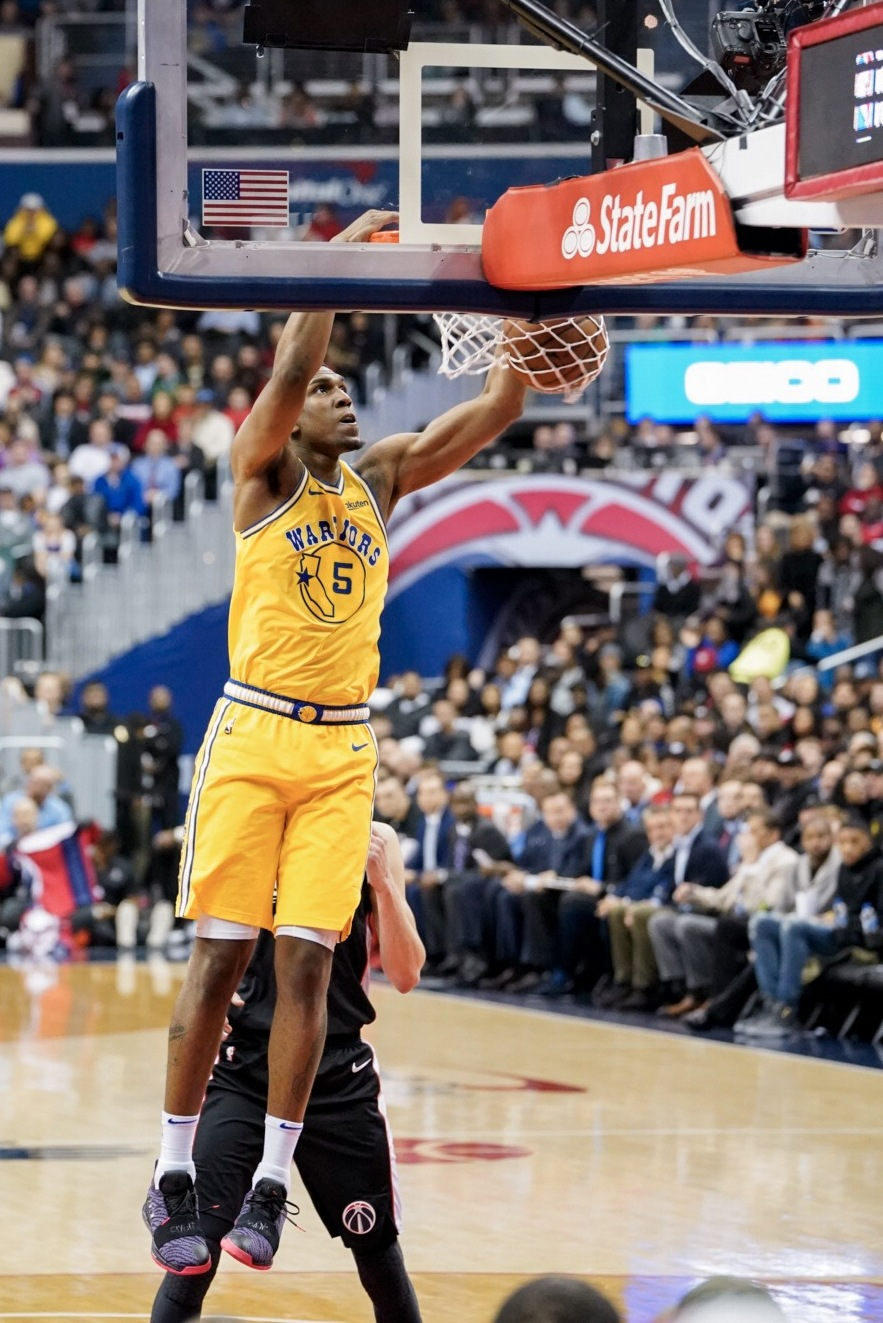
Looney scoring on a dunk against the Washington Wizards in 2019

Looney re-signed with the Warriors for 2018–19. Golden State also added four-time NBA All-Star center DeMarcus Cousins with their mid-level exception, but he was rehabbing his left Achilles tendon and had no definitive timeline on returning. Looney began the season as a reserve, while Damian Jones was the starting center. However, Jones was ruled out for the season after tearing his left pectoral muscle in December. On December 3, 2018, in his first start for the injured Jones, Looney scored 14 points along with a career-high-tying five assists during a 128–111 victory over the Atlanta Hawks. After starting at center for all except one of the previous 18 games, he returned to the bench when Cousins made his Warriors debut on January 18, 2019. On January 28, Looney scored a career-high 15 points, shooting 6-for-7 off the bench, in a 132–100 victory over the Indiana Pacers.

Looney ended the regular season averaging career highs in points (6.3), shooting percentage (62.5 percent), rebounds (5.2) and minutes played (18.5). In Game 2 of the Warriors' first-round playoff series against the Los Angeles Clippers, following a first-quarter injury to Cousins, Looney scored a career-high 19 points during the 135–131 loss. With Cousins expected to be out for the remainder of the playoffs, Kerr started Andrew Bogut—the former Warrior who was acquired late in the season—to keep Looney in the backup role where he had excelled. The Warriors advanced to the following round against Houston, when Kerr opened the series by starting the Hamptons Five, placing Iguodola into the starting lineup and moving Green to center. Looney assumed Bogut's minutes, as he was a better defensive option against the Rockets as a backup to Green. In Game 5, Looney had nine rebounds, including five on the offensive end, and a key block late in the game as the Warriors won to go up 3–2 in the series despite losing Kevin Durant to a right calf strain near the end of the third quarter. Kerr called Looney their "unsung hero." Golden State advanced to the Western Conference Finals, where Looney excelled for the second straight year. He was their best center in the series, and closed out their sweep of the Portland Trail Blazers with 12 points and a career-high 14 rebounds in Game 4. Kerr lauded Looney as a "foundational piece" of the franchise. During Game 2 of the NBA Finals against the Toronto Raptors, Looney collided with Kawhi Leonard and suffered a non-displaced first costal cartilage fracture, near the collarbone, and was unavailable in Game 3. Looney was averaging 20.4 minutes per game and shooting 73 percent in the playoffs. While most of his shots were from short distance, Looney remained an efficient 73 percent (38 of 52) when tightly guarded. He returned in Game 4 to play the rest of the series, but the Warriors lost in six games.

==== Nerve injuries and later years (2019–2025) ====
During the off-season, Looney re-signed with the Warriors on a three-year deal worth $15 million. That summer, he began feeling discomfort in his hamstrings. Looney was sidelined following the 2019–20 season-opener after tightness in his hamstring was diagnosed as neuropathy, a disorder resulting from nerve damage outside of the brain and spinal cord. Looney had managed to play through the condition since his second season in the NBA, often experiencing numbness in his hands, wrists, and feet. However, Looney could no longer deal with the situation once it reached his hamstrings. Looney was limited to playing in just 20 games during the season, averaging only 3.4 points and 3.3 rebounds per game. On May 19, 2020, Looney underwent surgery to repair a core muscle injury and was expected to be ready for the start of the following season.

Looney began the 2020–21 season as a backup to rookie center James Wiseman, the No. 2 overall draft pick. However, Looney became the Warriors' only true center after the rookie suffered a meniscus tear and was sidelined for the season. On April 19, 2021, Looney had a career-high 15 rebounds in a 107–96 victory over the Philadelphia 76ers, and he held Embiid to 4-of-14 shooting when guarding him.

In the offseason, Looney exercised his player option to continue with the Warriors for the 2021–22 season. Looney was Golden State's starting center, as Wiseman remained sidelined by injuries. On January 9, 2022, Looney recorded a career-high 18 rebounds in a 96–82 victory over the Cleveland Cavaliers. Able to manage the pain from his neuropathy, Looney played in all 82 games of the regular season, making a career-high 80 starts and averaging career bests with 21.1 minutes and 7.3 rebounds per game. In the Western Conference semifinals against the Memphis Grizzlies, Looney made his first start of the series in Game 6, grabbing a career-high 22 rebounds in a 110–96 victory to clinch the series. Replacing Jonathan Kuminga in the lineup, Looney had 11 rebounds in the first quarter, a career high for him in any quarter, helping the Warriors outrebound the Grizzlies 70–44 in the game. Looney's 11 offensive rebounds were more than the entire Memphis team had combined. In Game 2 of the Western Conference finals against the Dallas Mavericks, Looney received "MVP" chants as he recorded a double-double with a career-high 21 points and 12 rebounds to help lead a 19-point comeback as the Warriors took a 2–0 series lead. It was his first 20-point game since college, and it was the first 20-point, 10-rebound performance by a Golden State center in the playoffs since Robert Parish in 1977. In Game 5, Looney had 10 points and 18 rebounds, including seven on the offensive end, helping the Warriors win the series 4–1 and advance to their sixth NBA Finals in eight years. He was one of their top players in the Dallas series, dominating on offensive rebounds and playing excellent defense. Looney won his third championship, averaging 7.5 rebounds and 5.0 points as the Warriors defeated the Boston Celtics in six games in the 2022 NBA Finals.

On July 10, 2022, Looney re-signed with the Warriors on a three-year, $25.5 million contract. On January 2, 2023, he made a game-winning tip-in as time expired in a 143–141 double-overtime victory over the Atlanta Hawks. Looney finished the game with a regular season career-high 20 rebounds, including 10 on the offensive end, along with 14 points and five assists. He played all 82 games of the season again, while averaging career-highs in points (7.0) and rebounds per game (9.3), which ranked 15th in the NBA. In the first round of the 2023 playoffs, Looney averaged 15.1 rebounds per game in a 4–3 series victory over the Sacramento Kings. He became the first NBA player with three games of 20 or more rebounds in a series since Dwight Howard in 2008, and joined Wilt Chamberlain and Nate Thurmond as the third Warrior to accomplish the feat. In Game 1 of the Western Conference Semifinals, Looney had 10 points, 23 rebounds, and five assists in a 117–112 loss to the Lakers. He came off the bench for the rest of the series as the Warriors attempted to counter the Lakers' Anthony Davis.

On March 7, 2024, Looney saw his streak of 290 consecutive games played snapped after being declared inactive by Steve Kerr prior to that day's game against the Chicago Bulls. The designation served as the first game Looney did not play in since March 20, 2021.

=== New Orleans Pelicans (2025–2026) ===
On July 7, 2025, Looney signed a two-year, $16 million contract with the New Orleans Pelicans, reuniting with former teammate Jordan Poole. According to Looney, he felt like his playing time, especially during the 2025 NBA playoffs, was limited and that the Warriors were not utilizing him in ways that suited his strengths, even against favorable matchups. Looney made 21 appearances (including eight starts) for New Orleans during the 2025–26 season, recording averages of 2.8 points, 5.6 rebounds, and 1.6 assists.

=== Los Angeles Lakers (2026–present) ===
On July 13, 2026, Looney signed a one-year, $3.9 million contract with the Los Angeles Lakers to backup starting center Walker Kessler. On October 21, he made his Lakers debut, recording six points and five rebounds in a 127–105 win over the Golden State Warriors.

== Player profile ==
Standing at 6 feet 9 inches (2.06 m), Looney is most suited to playing power forward. Possessing a 7-foot-4-inch (2.24 m) wingspan, he is also a capable, small-ball center who is able to guard all five positions. Looney's length allows him to switch assignments and defend guards. He moves fairly well on the perimeter, and is not easily lured by pump fakes. Looney can also defend the rim.

Looney had limited mobility after his hip surgeries. Lacking explosion, he worked on faking opponents and getting his defender off balance. After becoming healthier and losing weight, Looney became more athletic and proficient at catching lob passes. During the summer 2018 off-season, he worked on finishing the lobs without having to land first. Looney practiced in a Shoot 360 facility in Oakland, which gives players feedback in real time on their technique. He said: "I like to get the feedback. How did I shoot today? Was my shot flat on my misses? What was causing my misses?"

== Career statistics ==
Legend
GP	Games played	GS	Games started	MPG	Minutes per game
FG%	Field goal percentage	3P%	3-point field goal percentage	FT%	Free throw percentage
RPG	Rebounds per game	APG	Assists per game	SPG	Steals per game
BPG	Blocks per game	PPG	Points per game	**Bold**	Career high
†	Won an NBA championship	*	Led the league

=== NBA ===
==== Regular season ====
Year	Team	GP	GS	MPG	FG%	3P%	FT%	RPG	APG	SPG	BPG	PPG
2015–16	Golden State	5	0	4.1	.571	**.500**	—	2.0	.0	.0	.0	1.8
2016–17†	Golden State	53	4	8.4	.523	.222	.618	2.3	.5	.3	.3	2.5
2017–18†	Golden State	66	4	13.8	.580	.200	.545	3.3	.6	.5	**.8**	4.0
2018–19	Golden State	80	24	18.5	.625	.100	.619	5.2	1.5	**.6**	.7	6.3
2019–20	Golden State	20	4	13.1	.367	.071	**.750**	3.3	1.0	**.6**	.3	3.4
2020–21	Golden State	61	34	19.0	.548	.235	.646	5.3	2.0	.3	.4	4.1
2021–22†	Golden State	**82***	**80**	21.1	.571	.000	.600	7.3	2.0	**.6**	.6	6.0
2022–23	Golden State	**82**	70	**23.9**	**.630**	.000	.606	**9.3**	**2.5**	**.6**	.6	**7.0**
2023–24	Golden State	74	36	16.1	.597	.000	.675	5.7	1.8	.4	.4	4.5
2024–25	Golden State	76	6	15.0	.514	.400	.566	6.1	1.6	**.6**	.5	4.5
2025–26	New Orleans	21	8	14.7	.417	.154	.700	5.6	1.6	.4	.5	2.8
Career		620	270	17.1	.570	.179	.610	5.7	1.6	.5	.5	4.9

==== Playoffs ====
Year	Team	GP	GS	MPG	FG%	3P%	FT%	RPG	APG	SPG	BPG	PPG
2018†	Golden State	21	5	18.4	.542	.000	.381	4.2	.9	**.7**	.4	4.1
2019	Golden State	21	1	20.5	**.688**	—	.724	4.5	1.0	.6	**.5**	**7.1**
2022†	Golden State	**22**	**13**	20.4	.659	—	.611	7.6	2.2	.4	**.5**	5.8
2023	Golden State	13	8	**25.0**	.578	—	.556	**13.1**	**3.3**	.6	.4	6.5
2025	Golden State	12	0	10.0	.435	—	**.750**	3.6	.3	.4	.3	2.2
Career		89	27	19.2	.612	.000	.596	6.3	1.5	.5	.4	5.3

=== College ===
Year	Team	GP	GS	MPG	FG%	3P%	FT%	RPG	APG	SPG	BPG	PPG
2014–15	UCLA	36	36	30.9	.470	.415	.626	9.2	1.4	1.3	.9	11.6

== Personal life ==
In addition to his brother Kevin, Looney has an older sister named Summer. His cousin Nick Young also played in the NBA, and they were teammates on the Warriors in 2017–18.
