= 2018 NBA Finals =

2018 basketball championship series

Team	Coach	Wins
Golden State Warriors	Steve Kerr	4
Cleveland Cavaliers	Tyronn Lue	0
- Dates: May 31 – June 8
- MVP: Kevin Durant (Golden State Warriors)
- Eastern finals: Cavaliers defeated Celtics, 4–3
- Western finals: Warriors defeated Rockets, 4–3

The 2018 NBA Finals was the championship series of the National Basketball Association's (NBA) 2017–18 season and conclusion of the season's playoffs. In this best-of-seven playoff, the defending NBA champion and Western Conference champion Golden State Warriors swept the Eastern Conference champion Cleveland Cavaliers in four games to repeat as champions for the first time in franchise history, having previously won in 2017. The series began on May 31, and ended on June 8 with the first NBA Finals sweep since 2007. Golden State Warriors small forward Kevin Durant was named the NBA Finals Most Valuable Player (MVP) for the second consecutive year, after averaging 28.8 points, 10.8 rebounds, and 7.5 assists in the series. Durant became the first and only player in the history of the Warriors franchise to win two consecutive NBA Finals MVP Awards and also the first and only player in the history of the NBA to have been named two NBA Finals MVP in the first two seasons with a team.

The Finals was the first time in any of North America's four major professional sports leagues that the same two teams met for the championship for four consecutive years. Entering the series, the Warriors, who had home-court advantage over the Cavaliers, were noted by various sports media outlets as one of the biggest NBA Finals favorites in recent history.

In a tightly contested Game 1, George Hill missed one of his two free throw attempts at the end of the game, and J. R. Smith got the rebound and dribbled out the clock, thinking the Cavaliers were in the lead (the game was instead tied). The Warriors dominated in overtime and went on to win the next three games to complete the sweep. The series broke the record set by the 2014 NBA Finals for highest average scoring differential per game (15.0) for an NBA Finals series.

As of 2026, the 2018 Finals are the most recent NBA Finals to have a repeat champion, the most recent where the losing team was swept, and the last championship series in the four major sports leagues to result in a sweep.

== Background ==
=== Golden State Warriors ===
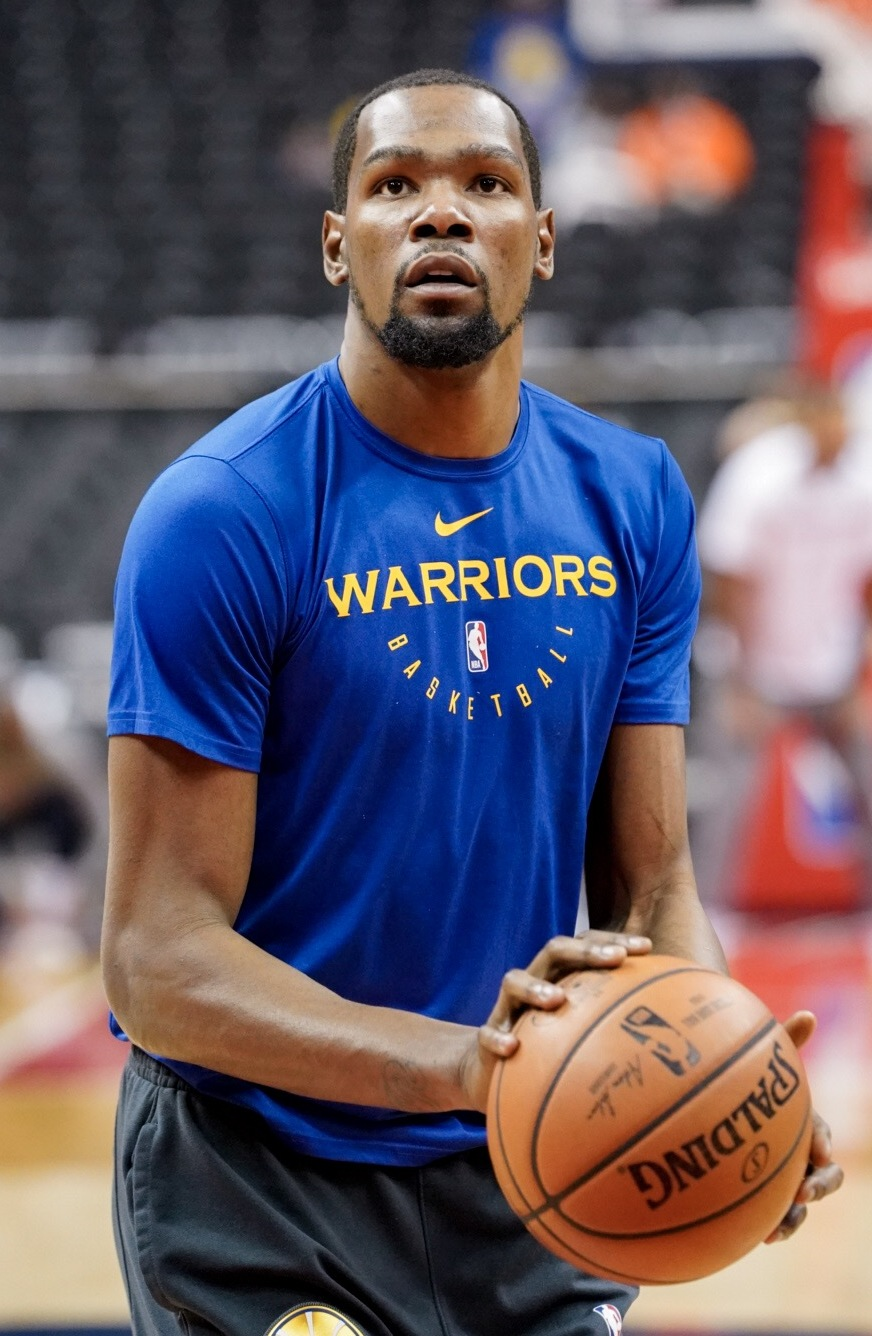
Kevin Durant scored 608 points in the 2018 NBA playoffs, the most points in a single NBA playoff run of his career

This was the Golden State Warriors' fourth consecutive trip to the NBA Finals. During the 2017–18 offseason, the Warriors re-signed their core players, including reigning NBA Finals MVP Kevin Durant to a two-year, $53 million contract and point guard Stephen Curry to a five-year contract worth $201 million. Golden State also re-signed Andre Iguodala, Shaun Livingston, Zaza Pachulia, and David West. A free agent acquired during the offseason was guard Nick Young.

The Warriors finished the 2017–18 regular season with a 58–24 record, winning the Pacific Division and securing the 2nd seed in the Western Conference. In the playoffs, Golden State defeated the San Antonio Spurs in five games in the first round, eliminated the New Orleans Pelicans in five games in the Western Conference Semifinals, and despite major obstacles, they defeated the top-seeded Houston Rockets in seven games in the Western Conference Finals.

The Warriors entered the series as heavy favorites, aiming to repeat back-to-back titles after losing their quest in 2016.

=== Cleveland Cavaliers ===
This was the Cleveland Cavaliers' fourth consecutive trip to the NBA Finals, and fifth appearance overall. This was also the eighth consecutive NBA Finals appearance for Cavaliers small forward LeBron James, a streak that began in 2011 when he was with the Miami Heat.

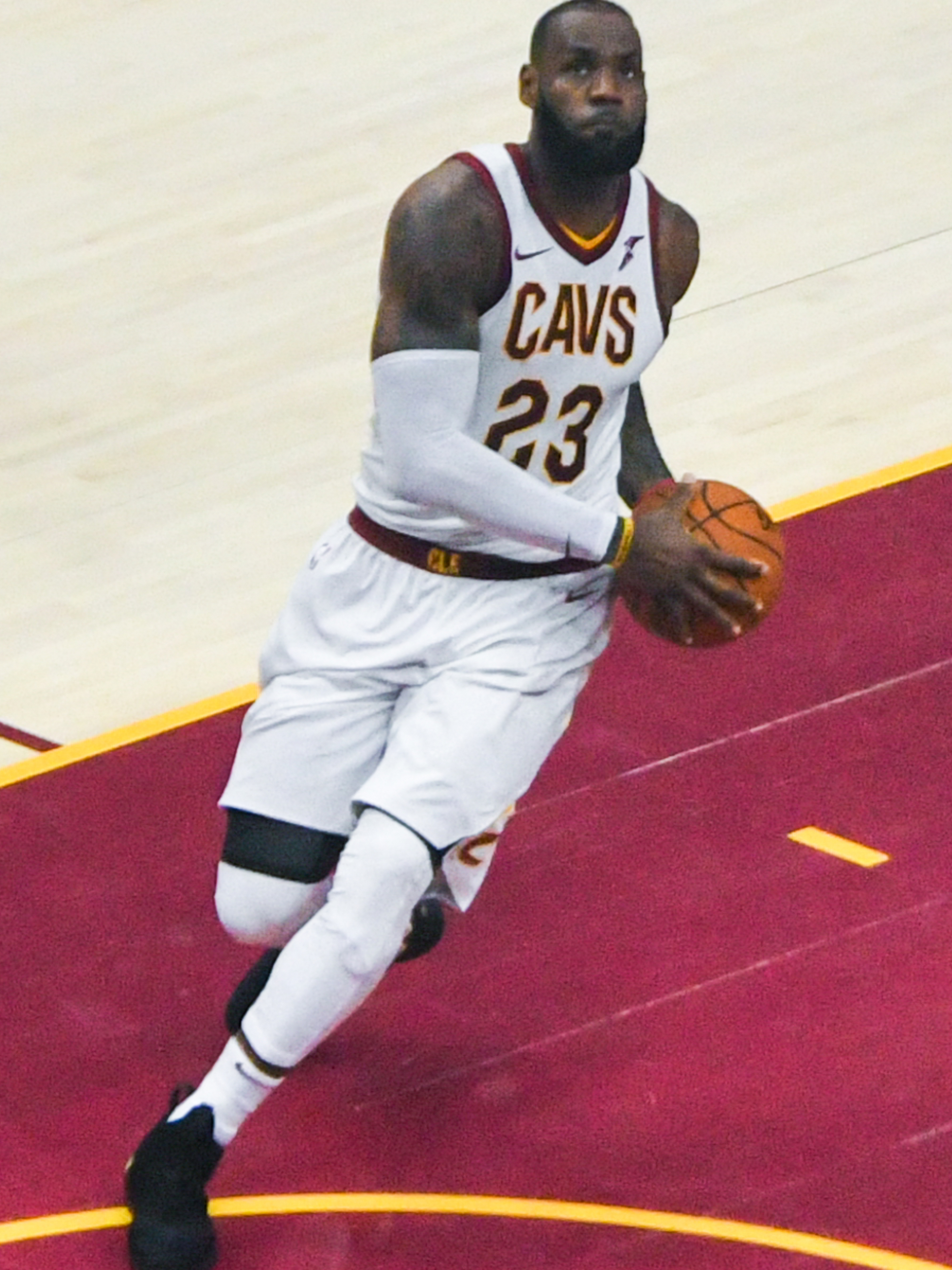
The 2018 NBA Finals marked LeBron James' eighth consecutive Finals appearance, and his ninth overall

Prior to the 2017–18 season, All-Star point guard Kyrie Irving requested to be traded away from the Cavaliers. Although James was against the idea of trading him away, the Cavaliers agreed to Irving's request, trading him to the Boston Celtics in exchange for point guard Isaiah Thomas, small forward Jae Crowder, center Ante Žižić, the first-round pick from the Brooklyn Nets in the 2018 NBA draft and the Miami Heat's 2020 second-round pick. Miami's second-round pick was added as compensation after Isaiah Thomas failed his physical. Other major changes included shooting guard Dwyane Wade signing with the Cavaliers, thus reuniting with James from their time together on the Big Three-era Miami Heat, and the signing of point guard Derrick Rose to a one-year contract.

On February 8, 2018 – just before the NBA trade deadline – the Cavaliers radically changed their roster in a little more than an hour, acquiring George Hill, Rodney Hood, Jordan Clarkson, and Larry Nance Jr. in exchange for Thomas, Rose, Crowder, Wade, Channing Frye, Iman Shumpert, and their own 2018 first-round pick. Multiple writers argued at the time that the trades made the Cavaliers significantly better.

The Cavaliers finished the regular season with a 50–32 record, securing the 4th seed in the Eastern Conference. In the playoffs, the Cavaliers defeated the Indiana Pacers in seven games in the first round, swept the top-seeded Toronto Raptors in the Eastern Conference Semifinals, and defeated the Boston Celtics in seven games in the Eastern Conference Finals.

=== Road to the Finals ===
Cleveland Cavaliers (Eastern Conference champion)		Golden State Warriors (Western Conference champion)
Eastern Conference: # / Team / W / L / PCT / GB / GP; 1 / c – Toronto Raptors * / 59 / 23 / .720 / – / 82; 2 / x – Boston Celtics / 55 / 27 / .671 / 4.0 / 82; 3 / x – Philadelphia 76ers / 52 / 30 / .634 / 7.0 / 82; 4 / y – Cleveland Cavaliers * / 50 / 32 / .610 / 9.0 / 82; 5 / x – Indiana Pacers / 48 / 34 / .585 / 11.0 / 82; 6 / y – Miami Heat * / 44 / 38 / .537 / 15.0 / 82; 7 / x – Milwaukee Bucks / 44 / 38 / .537 / 15.0 / 82; 8 / x – Washington Wizards / 43 / 39 / .524 / 16.0 / 82; 9 / Detroit Pistons / 39 / 43 / .476 / 20.0 / 82; 10 / Charlotte Hornets / 36 / 46 / .439 / 23.0 / 82; 11 / New York Knicks / 29 / 53 / .354 / 30.0 / 82; 12 / Brooklyn Nets / 28 / 54 / .341 / 31.0 / 82; 13 / Chicago Bulls / 27 / 55 / .329 / 32.0 / 82; 14 / Orlando Magic / 25 / 57 / .305 / 34.0 / 82; 15 / Atlanta Hawks / 24 / 58 / .293 / 35.0 / 82; 4th seed in the East, 6th best league record	Regular season	Western Conference: # / Team / W / L / PCT / GB / GP; 1 / z – Houston Rockets * / 65 / 17 / .793 / – / 82; 2 / y – Golden State Warriors * / 58 / 24 / .707 / 7.0 / 82; 3 / y – Portland Trail Blazers * / 49 / 33 / .598 / 16.0 / 82; 4 / x – Oklahoma City Thunder / 48 / 34 / .585 / 17.0 / 82; 5 / x – Utah Jazz / 48 / 34 / .585 / 17.0 / 82; 6 / x – New Orleans Pelicans / 48 / 34 / .585 / 17.0 / 82; 7 / x – San Antonio Spurs / 47 / 35 / .573 / 18.0 / 82; 8 / x – Minnesota Timberwolves / 47 / 35 / .573 / 18.0 / 82; 9 / Denver Nuggets / 46 / 36 / .561 / 19.0 / 82; 10 / Los Angeles Clippers / 42 / 40 / .512 / 23.0 / 82; 11 / Los Angeles Lakers / 35 / 47 / .427 / 30.0 / 82; 12 / Sacramento Kings / 27 / 55 / .329 / 38.0 / 82; 13 / Dallas Mavericks / 24 / 58 / .293 / 41.0 / 82; 14 / Memphis Grizzlies / 22 / 60 / .268 / 43.0 / 82; 15 / Phoenix Suns / 21 / 61 / .256 / 44.0 / 82; 2nd seed in the West, 3rd best league record
Defeated the 5th seeded Indiana Pacers, 4–3	First round	Defeated the 7th seeded San Antonio Spurs, 4–1
Defeated the 1st seeded Toronto Raptors, 4–0	Conference semifinals	Defeated the 6th seeded New Orleans Pelicans, 4–1
Defeated the 2nd seeded Boston Celtics, 4–3	Conference finals	Defeated the 1st seeded Houston Rockets, 4–3

=== Regular season series ===
The Warriors won the regular season series 2–0.

December 25, 2017

Recap

Cleveland Cavaliers 92, Golden State Warriors 99

Oracle Arena, Oakland, California

January 15, 2018

Recap

Golden State Warriors 118, Cleveland Cavaliers 108

Quicken Loans Arena, Cleveland, Ohio

== Series summary ==
Game	Date	Road team	Result	Home team
Game 1	May 31	Cleveland Cavaliers	114–124 (OT) (0–1)	Golden State Warriors
Game 2	June 3	Cleveland Cavaliers	103–122 (0–2)	Golden State Warriors
Game 3	June 6	Golden State Warriors	110–102 (3–0)	Cleveland Cavaliers
Game 4	June 8	Golden State Warriors	108–85 (4–0)	Cleveland Cavaliers

== Game summaries ==
=== Game 1 ===
ABC

May 31
9:00 pm (6:00 pm PDT)

Boxscore

Cleveland Cavaliers 114, Golden State Warriors 124 (OT)
Scoring by quarter: 30–29, 26–27, 22–28, 29–23, Overtime: 7–17
Pts: LeBron James 51; Rebs: Kevin Love 13; Asts: LeBron James 8	Pts: Stephen Curry 29; Rebs: Draymond Green 11; Asts: Draymond Green, Curry 9 each
Golden State leads series, 1–0

Oracle Arena, Oakland, California
Attendance: 19,596
Referees:
- No. 41 Ken Mauer
- No. 25 Tony Brothers
- No. 14 Ed Malloy

Klay Thompson of the Warriors suffered a leg injury in the first quarter, but returned in the second quarter. With the score tied at 107 in the last five seconds of regulation, J. R. Smith of the Cavaliers collected an offensive rebound following a missed free throw from teammate George Hill, but dribbled the ball towards half court rather than taking a final shot. Tyronn Lue, Cleveland's coach, later said that Smith thought the Cavaliers were ahead, though Smith denied not knowing the correct score, and claimed that he assumed his team would take a time-out. Cleveland was not able to score in the final seconds, and the game went to overtime. In overtime, the Warriors outscored the Cavaliers 17–7 to win the game. Tristan Thompson was ejected following a flagrant foul with 2.6 seconds remaining in overtime.

Cleveland's LeBron James scored 51 points in Game 1, the fifth-highest point total for an NBA Finals game and the most in a loss. After Game 1, he punched a whiteboard in the Cavaliers' locker room due to frustration of his team's level of play, suffering a bone contusion in his hand that he kept private for the rest of the series.

=== Game 2 ===
ABC

June 3
8:00 pm (5:00 pm PDT)

Boxscore

Cleveland Cavaliers 103, Golden State Warriors 122
Scoring by quarter: 28–32, 18–27, 34–31, 23–32
Pts: LeBron James 29; Rebs: Kevin Love 10; Asts: LeBron James 13	Pts: Stephen Curry 33; Rebs: Kevin Durant 9 Asts: Stephen Curry 8
Golden State leads series, 2–0

Oracle Arena, Oakland, California
Attendance: 19,596
Referees:
- No. 24 Mike Callahan
- No. 16 David Guthrie
- No. 9 Derrick Stafford

The Warriors employed more double teams against James in Game 2, limiting him to 29 points. Cleveland had a 41% field goal percentage, including 9-for-27 (33.3%) on three-point field goals. Meanwhile, Golden State's Stephen Curry set an NBA Finals record in Game 2 with nine three-point field goals. He scored 33 points, while the Warriors got 26 points, nine rebounds, and seven assists from Kevin Durant, and 20 points from Klay Thompson. Smith struggled for Cleveland, shooting 2-for-9 (22.2%) with both baskets coming in the first quarter. The Warriors won 122–103 over the Cavaliers.

=== Game 3 ===
ABC

June 6
9:00 pm

Boxscore

Golden State Warriors 110, Cleveland Cavaliers 102
Scoring by quarter: 28–29, 24–29, 31–23, 27–21
Pts: Kevin Durant 43; Rebs: Kevin Durant 13; Asts: Draymond Green 9	Pts: LeBron James 33; Rebs: Kevin Love 13; Asts: LeBron James 11
Golden State leads series, 3–0

Quicken Loans Arena, Cleveland, Ohio
Attendance: 20,562
Referees:
- No. 8 Marc Davis
- No. 30 John Goble
- No. 15 Zach Zarba

Andre Iguodala of the Warriors, who missed the previous six games, including the first two games of the NBA Finals, due to a left leg injury, returned in Game 3. He injured his right leg early in the game, not returning until after halftime. The Cavaliers started the game with a 14–4 advantage and led for the entire first half, at one point leading by 13. The Warriors trimmed Cleveland's lead to six by halftime. The Cavaliers enjoyed strong contributions from Rodney Hood, who scored 15 points, Smith, who scored 13 points, and Kevin Love, who had 20 points and 13 rebounds.

Durant, who reprised his dagger three-pointer over LeBron James from Game 3 the previous year with 49.8 seconds left to give the Warriors a 106–100 lead, scored a playoff career-high 43 points, while also contributing 13 rebounds and seven assists, in a 110–102 victory over the Cavaliers, helping the Warriors take a 3–0 lead. Golden State withstood poor offensive performances from Curry and Klay Thompson, the Splash Brothers. Curry missed 13 out of his first 14 shot attempts in the game. The Cavaliers were 3-for-17 (17.6%) on three point shots in the second half, and Durant scored a three-pointer late in the game that ended Cleveland's chances of a comeback. With the 110–102 victory, the Warriors took a 3–0 series lead.

=== Game 4 ===
ABC

June 8
9:00 pm

Boxscore

Golden State Warriors 108, Cleveland Cavaliers 85
Scoring by quarter: 34–25, 27–27, 25–13, 22–20
Pts: Stephen Curry 37; Rebs: Kevin Durant 12; Asts: Kevin Durant 10	Pts: LeBron James 23; Rebs: Kevin Love 9 Asts: LeBron James 8
Golden State wins NBA Finals, 4–0

Quicken Loans Arena, Cleveland, Ohio
Attendance: 20,562
Referees:
- No. 48 Scott Foster
- No. 19 James Capers
- No. 23 Jason Phillips

The Warriors led the game nearly from start to finish. Golden State led 13–3 at the start of the game. Although the Cavaliers took a narrow 39–38 led in the second quarter, the Warriors led 61–52 at halftime. Golden State expanded their lead in the third quarter and entered the last period of play with an 86–65 advantage.

With Golden State leading 102–77 with 4:03 remaining, James came out of the game, receiving a standing ovation. Curry scored 37 points and made seven three-pointers, while Durant recorded a triple-double with 20 points, 12 rebounds and 10 assists. The Warriors won 108–85 to sweep the series. Durant was named Finals MVP for the second straight year. Durant received seven of the 11 votes, with Curry receiving the other four.

Game 4 was also James' last game as a Cavalier as he joined the Los Angeles Lakers during the offseason.

The Warriors' victory parade took place on June 12 in Downtown Oakland.

== Rosters ==
=== Golden State Warriors ===
2017–18 Golden State Warriors roster
Players

Pos.	No.	Player	Height	Weight	DOB	From
F/C	2	Jordan Bell	6 ft 9 in (2.06 m)	224 lb (102 kg)	1995–01–07	Oregon
F	25	Chris Boucher (TW)	6 ft 10 in (2.08 m)	200 lb (91 kg)	1993–01–11	Oregon
G	4	Quinn Cook	6 ft 2 in (1.88 m)	179 lb (81 kg)	1993–03–23	Duke
G	30	Stephen Curry	6 ft 3 in (1.91 m)	190 lb (86 kg)	1988–03–14	Davidson
F	35	Kevin Durant	6 ft 9 in (2.06 m)	240 lb (109 kg)	1988–09–29	Texas
F	23	Draymond Green	6 ft 7 in (2.01 m)	230 lb (104 kg)	1990–03–04	Michigan State
G/F	9	Andre Iguodala	6 ft 6 in (1.98 m)	215 lb (98 kg)	1984–01–28	Arizona
C	15	Damian Jones	7 ft 0 in (2.13 m)	245 lb (111 kg)	1995–06–30	Vanderbilt
G	34	Shaun Livingston	6 ft 7 in (2.01 m)	192 lb (87 kg)	1985–09–11	Peoria Central HS (IL)
F/C	5	Kevon Looney	6 ft 9 in (2.06 m)	220 lb (100 kg)	1996–02–06	UCLA
G	0	Patrick McCaw	6 ft 7 in (2.01 m)	185 lb (84 kg)	1995–10–25	UNLV
C	1	JaVale McGee	7 ft 0 in (2.13 m)	270 lb (122 kg)	1988–01–19	Nevada
C	27	Zaza Pachulia	6 ft 11 in (2.11 m)	270 lb (122 kg)	1984–02–10	Georgia
G	11	Klay Thompson	6 ft 7 in (2.01 m)	215 lb (98 kg)	1990–02–08	Washington State
F	3	David West	6 ft 9 in (2.06 m)	250 lb (113 kg)	1980–08–29	Xavier
G/F	6	Nick Young	6 ft 7 in (2.01 m)	210 lb (95 kg)	1985–06–01	USC

Coaches
Head coach
- Steve Kerr
Assistant(s)
- Mike Brown (associate HC)
- Ron Adams
- Jarron Collins
- Chris DeMarco (player development)
- Bruce Fraser (player development)
- Willie Green (player development)

Legend
- (DP) Unsigned draft pick
- (FA) Free agent
- (S) Suspended
- (GL) On assignment to G League affiliate
- (TW) Two-way affiliate player
- Injured

Roster
Updated: April 10, 2018

=== Cleveland Cavaliers ===
2017–18 Cleveland Cavaliers roster
Players

Pos.	No.	Player	Height	Weight	DOB	From
G	81	José Calderón	6 ft 3 in (1.91 m)	200 lb (91 kg)	1981–09–28	Spain
G	8	Jordan Clarkson	6 ft 5 in (1.96 m)	194 lb (88 kg)	1992–06–07	Missouri
F	32	Jeff Green	6 ft 9 in (2.06 m)	235 lb (107 kg)	1986–08–28	Georgetown
G	3	George Hill	6 ft 3 in (1.91 m)	188 lb (85 kg)	1986–05–04	IUPUI
G/F	10	John Holland (TW)	6 ft 5 in (1.96 m)	205 lb (93 kg)	1988–11–06	Boston University
G/F	1	Rodney Hood	6 ft 8 in (2.03 m)	206 lb (93 kg)	1992–10–20	Duke
G/F	23	LeBron James	6 ft 8 in (2.03 m)	250 lb (113 kg)	1984–12–30	St. Vincent–St. Mary HS (OH)
G/F	26	Kyle Korver	6 ft 7 in (2.01 m)	212 lb (96 kg)	1981–03–17	Creighton
F/C	0	Kevin Love	6 ft 10 in (2.08 m)	251 lb (114 kg)	1988–09–07	UCLA
F	22	Larry Nance Jr.	6 ft 9 in (2.06 m)	230 lb (104 kg)	1993–01–01	Wyoming
G/F	16	Cedi Osman	6 ft 8 in (2.03 m)	215 lb (98 kg)	1995–04–08	Turkey
C	21	Kendrick Perkins	6 ft 10 in (2.08 m)	270 lb (122 kg)	1984–11–10	Clifton J. Ozen HS (TX)
G	15	London Perrantes (TW)	6 ft 2 in (1.88 m)	190 lb (86 kg)	1994–10–03	Virginia
G/F	5	J. R. Smith	6 ft 6 in (1.98 m)	225 lb (102 kg)	1985–09–09	Saint Benedict's Prep (NJ)
F/C	13	Tristan Thompson	6 ft 9 in (2.06 m)	238 lb (108 kg)	1991–03–13	Texas
F	9	Okaro White	6 ft 8 in (2.03 m)	215 lb (98 kg)	1992–08–13	Florida State
F/C	41	Ante Žižić	6 ft 11 in (2.11 m)	250 lb (113 kg)	1997–01–04	Croatia

Coaches
Head coach
- Tyronn Lue
Assistant(s)
- Larry Drew (Assoc. HC)
- Jim Boylan
- Phil Handy
- Damon Jones
- Mike Longabardi
- James Posey
- Vitaly Potapenko

Legend
- (DP) Unsigned draft pick
- (FA) Free agent
- (S) Suspended
- (GL) On assignment to G League affiliate
- (TW) Two-way affiliate player
- Injured

Roster
Updated: April 11, 2018

== Player statistics ==
Legend
GP	Games played	GS	Games started	MPG	Minutes per game
FG%	Field-goal percentage	3P%	3-point field-goal percentage	FT%	Free-throw percentage
RPG	Rebounds per game	APG	Assists per game	SPG	Steals per game
BPG	Blocks per game	PPG	Points per game

Golden State Warriors

Golden State Warriors statistics
Player	GP	GS	MPG	FG%	3P%	FT%	RPG	APG	SPG	BPG	PPG
Kevin Durant	4	4	41.3	.526	.409	.963	10.8	7.5	0.8	2.3	28.8
Stephen Curry	4	4	40.6	.402	.415	1.000	6.0	6.8	1.5	0.8	27.5
Klay Thompson	4	4	37.0	.480	.429	.800	3.8	1.0	0.5	0.3	16.0
Draymond Green	4	4	41.4	.517	.214	.800	6.0	8.5	2.0	1.5	9.3
JaVale McGee	4	3	13.8	.800	.000	.000	2.3	0.0	0.0	1.3	8.0
Shaun Livingston	4	0	16.2	.867	.000	1.000	2.8	1.5	0.3	0.0	7.5
Jordan Bell	4	0	13.5	.714	.000	.500	3.3	1.0	0.3	0.5	5.8
Andre Iguodala	2	0	22.3	.583	.500	1.000	2.0	0.5	1.5	1.0	9.5
Kevon Looney	4	1	9.7	.714	.000	.000	1.5	0.3	0.3	0.0	2.5
Zaza Pachulia	2	0	3.1	.333	.000	1.000	1.5	0.0	0.0	0.5	4.0
David West	4	0	7.0	.600	1.000	.000	1.3	1.0	0.0	0.8	1.8
Quinn Cook	2	0	1.8	.333	.000	.000	0.0	0.0	0.0	0.0	1.0
Nick Young	4	0	9.5	.154	.100	.000	0.5	0.0	0.0	0.0	1.3
Patrick McCaw	4	0	2.7	.000	.000	1.000	0.3	0.0	0.3	0.0	0.5

Cleveland Cavaliers

Cleveland Cavaliers statistics
Player	GP	GS	MPG	FG%	3P%	FT%	RPG	APG	SPG	BPG	PPG
LeBron James	4	4	44.7	.527	.333	.842	8.5	10.0	1.3	1.0	34.0
Kevin Love	4	4	33.2	.406	.321	.938	11.3	1.8	1.0	0.3	19.0
J. R. Smith	4	4	32.5	.317	.360	.600	3.3	1.3	1.3	0.0	9.5
George Hill	4	4	29.2	.323	.438	.500	2.3	2.3	0.8	0.3	7.5
Tristan Thompson	4	4	23.4	.520	.000	.333	5.3	0.0	0.0	0.8	6.8
Rodney Hood	4	0	14.1	.444	.200	.667	3.8	0.8	0.5	0.5	6.8
Larry Nance Jr.	4	0	17.1	.500	.000	.417	7.0	1.5	0.5	0.5	5.8
Jeff Green	4	0	24.4	.286	.214	1.000	1.3	2.0	0.3	0.3	5.3
Jordan Clarkson	2	0	12.6	.231	.000	.000	2.0	0.5	1.0	0.5	3.0
Kyle Korver	4	0	16.2	.063	.091	.600	1.8	0.8	0.0	0.3	1.5
Ante Žižić	3	0	1.7	1.000	.000	.000	0.3	0.0	0.0	0.0	2.0
José Calderón	3	0	2.5	.500	.000	.000	1.0	0.7	0.3	0.0	1.3
Cedi Osman	3	0	2.8	.400	.000	.000	0.3	0.0	0.0	0.0	1.3

== Sponsorship ==
For the first time, the NBA sold a presenting sponsorship for the Finals to the internet television service YouTube TV. YouTube TV had previously been the presenting sponsor for the 2017 World Series, the first time that Major League Baseball's championship series had a title sponsor as well. As part of a multi-year partnership deal, YouTube TV also broadcast the NBA Finals.

== Broadcast ==
In the United States, the NBA Finals aired on ABC (and for the fourth consecutive year on local affiliates WEWS-TV in Cleveland and KGO-TV in San Francisco/Oakland) with Mike Breen as play-by-play commentator, and Mark Jackson and Jeff Van Gundy serving as color commentators. The series was sponsored by YouTube TV. ESPN Radio aired it as well and had Marc Kestecher and Hubie Brown as commentators. ESPN Deportes provided exclusive Spanish-language coverage of The Finals, with a commentary team of Álvaro Martín and Carlos Morales.

Television viewership figures
Game	Ratings (households)	American audience (in millions)	Ref
1	10.0	17.4	
2	10.3	18.5	
3	10.4	17.9	
4	9.3	16.5	
Avg	10.0	17.6	

== Aftermath ==
At the Warriors victory parade, the signs of disintegration of the dynasty began to show. When his team's in play-by-play announcer and the master of ceremony (MC) of the parade Bob Fitzgerald asked general manager Bob Myers if Kevin Durant could have whatever contract he wants next year, Myers scoffed and replied, “That was just for the media. He can’t have anything like that at all.” Fitzgerald then replied back, “Because I think last year you told Steph he could have whatever contract he wants, too.” Myers said back, “That was different. He’s been here from the way-before days. He’s earned it.” Although seemingly joking, Durant would take Myers words to heart. The team's sudden dysfunction reared its head in the regular season the following season. In a November 12, 2018 game against the LA Clippers, Kevin Durant and Draymond Green had a heated on-court argument that led to a locker room confrontation. In the closing seconds of regulation, Green was upset with how he was playing, and Durant was frustrated that he didn't get the ball for a potential game-winning shot. The incident became a major storyline and was later cited by Durant as a contributing factor to him leaving the Warriors in the summer of 2019.

James left the Cavaliers in the 2018 offseason to join the Los Angeles Lakers. He would lead the Lakers to a title in 2020, as well as winning another Finals MVP. The Cavaliers did not return to the playoffs until the 2022–23 season, which was also their first playoff appearance without James since 1998.

The Warriors still made it to a fifth consecutive Finals in 2019; however, they would lose this time to the Toronto Raptors in six games, ending their quest for a three-peat. In the series, Durant torn his Achilles tendon in Game 5 and Klay Thompson torn his ACL in Game 6. 2018 was the last Warriors championship until they won it again in 2022 by beating the Boston Celtics in six games. The following season, the Warriors 18–0 record under Steve Kerr in Western Conference playoff series ended after their defeat to James' Los Angeles Lakers in the Western Conference Semifinals in six games. The series pitted old foes LeBron James and Stephen Curry in potentially their last playoff series against each other.

Despite the loss, many people consider 2018 LeBron James' best playoff run, including James himself, as he averaged 34.0 points, 9.1 rebounds and 9.0 assists in 22 games. His 51 points in Game 1 is still the most points in an NBA Finals game since 1993, as well as the most ever in a loss.

== See also ==
- Death Lineup
- Cavaliers–Warriors rivalry
