= Shaun Livingston =

American basketball player (born 1985)

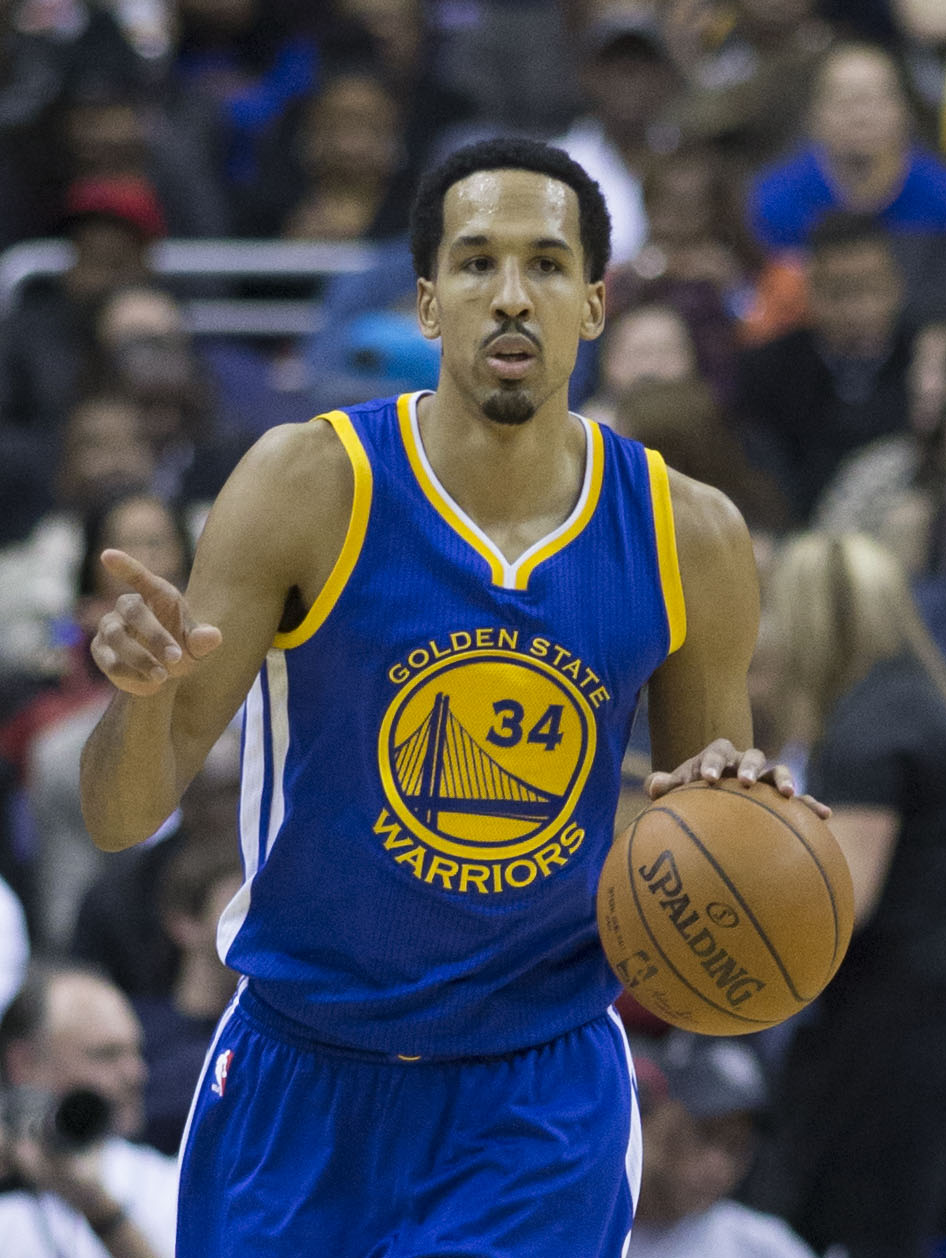
- Livingston with the Golden State Warriors in 2016

Personal information
- Born: September 11, 1985 (age 41) Peoria, Illinois, U.S.
- Listed height: 6 ft 7 in (2.01 m)
- Listed weight: 192 lb (87 kg)

Career information
- High school: Peoria (Peoria, Illinois)
- NBA draft: 2004: 1st round, 4th overall pick
- Drafted by: Los Angeles Clippers
- Playing career: 2004–2019
- Position: Point guard
- Number: 14, 2, 8, 9, 34

Career history
- 2004–2008: Los Angeles Clippers
- 2008–2009: Miami Heat
- 2009: Tulsa 66ers
- 2009: Oklahoma City Thunder
- 2010: Washington Wizards
- 2010–2011: Charlotte Bobcats
- 2011–2012: Milwaukee Bucks
- 2012: Washington Wizards
- 2012–2013: Cleveland Cavaliers
- 2013–2014: Brooklyn Nets
- 2014–2019: Golden State Warriors

Career highlights
- As player: 3× NBA champion (2015, 2017, 2018); First-team Parade All-American (2004); Fourth-team Parade All-American (2003); McDonald's All-American (2004); Illinois Mr. Basketball (2004); As executive: NBA champion (2022)

Career statistics
- Points: 5,231 (6.3 ppg)
- Rebounds: 1,989 (2.4 rpg)
- Assists: 2,483 (3.0 apg)
- Stats at NBA.com
- Stats at Basketball Reference

Shaun Livingston (born September 11, 1985) is an American professional basketball executive and former player. He entered the league directly out of high school and was selected fourth by the Los Angeles Clippers in the 2004 NBA draft. During his 15-year career, Livingston played 959 games for nine teams and won three NBA championships as a member of the Golden State Warriors—in 2015, 2017, and 2018.

In February 2007, Livingston suffered a debilitating knee injury that damaged almost every part of his left knee. It took Livingston about a year and a half to return. Between 2008 and 2010, he played only 22 league games. Livingston also played for the Miami Heat, Oklahoma City Thunder, Washington Wizards, Charlotte Bobcats, Milwaukee Bucks, Cleveland Cavaliers, and the Brooklyn Nets. He played his last five seasons in the league with the Warriors and retired from professional basketball in September 2019.

== Early years ==
Livingston was born in Peoria, Illinois. He led Concordia Lutheran Grade School to LSA state titles in 1999 and 2000. Livingston played competitive basketball in high school at Richwoods High School for two years and then transferred to Peoria Central High School, where he led his team to back-to-back Class AA state titles in 2003 and 2004.

In 2004, Livingston was named Illinois Mr. Basketball and played in the McDonald's All-American Game. In 2007, he was voted one of the 100 Legends of the IHSA Boys Basketball Tournament for his superior performance in the tournament. Considered a five-star recruit by Rivals.com, Livingston was listed as the No. 1 point guard and the No. 2 player in the nation in 2004. He committed to play college hoops at Duke, but opted instead to make the jump to the NBA straight out of high school.

== Professional career ==
=== Los Angeles Clippers (2004–2008) ===
Livingston committed to Duke, but opted to skip college and enter the 2004 NBA draft, where he was selected fourth by the Los Angeles Clippers. Livingston was 6 ft 7 in (2.01 m) and was considered to be tall by point guard standards and due to the addition of Sam Cassell to the Clippers' roster, gained playing time as a shooting guard instead. Livingston recorded a career-high 14 assists on February 23, 2007, against the Golden State Warriors.

In his first two NBA seasons, Livingston played 91 games and averaged 6.3 points per game. In his third season, Livingston averaged a career-high 9.3 points per game, being one of the few Clippers to improve from the 2005–06 season.

Livingston missed 101 of 246 regular‑season games during his first three NBA seasons due to injuries.

==== Knee injury ====
In a game against the Charlotte Bobcats on February 26, 2007, Livingston suffered a debilitating knee injury, dislocating his left kneecap after landing awkwardly following a missed layup, resulting in a severe lateral dislocation of the knee. Livingston injured almost every part of his knee, tearing the anterior cruciate ligament (ACL), the posterior cruciate ligament (PCL), and the lateral meniscus, badly spraining his medial collateral ligament (MCL), and dislocating his patella and his tibio-fibular joint. Livingston was told by a medical professional at the hospital that there was a chance that his leg would have to be amputated. Livingston required months of rehabilitation to be able to walk again.

=== Miami Heat (2008–2009) ===
Livingston's contract with the Clippers expired after the 2007–08 season, and the Clippers did not make him a $5.8 million qualifying offer, making him an unrestricted free agent. On June 16, 2008, doctors allowed Livingston to resume basketball activities; during the 2008 offseason, he tried to find a guaranteed contract to finalize his comeback. The Minnesota Timberwolves and Portland Trail Blazers were interested, but it was reported Livingston eventually signed a two-year deal with the Miami Heat on October 3, 2008. In four games with the Heat, he averaged 2.3 points and 10.3 minutes.

=== Tulsa 66ers (2009) ===
On January 7, 2009, Livingston was traded to the Memphis Grizzlies along with cash considerations for a conditional 2012 second-round pick. He was then waived later that same day. On March 7, 2009, Livingston signed with the Tulsa 66ers, the NBA development league team owned by the Oklahoma City Thunder.

=== Oklahoma City Thunder (2009) ===
After three weeks with the 66ers, Livingston signed a multi-year deal with the Thunder on March 31, 2009. On December 22, he was waived by the Thunder.

=== Washington Wizards (2010) ===
On February 26, 2010, Livingston signed the first of his two 10-day contracts with the Washington Wizards. Eventually, Livingston was then signed for the rest of the season.

=== Charlotte Bobcats (2010–2011) ===
On July 20, 2010, Livingston signed a two-year contract worth $7 million with the Charlotte Bobcats.

=== Milwaukee Bucks (2011–2012) ===
On June 23, 2011, Livingston was traded to the Milwaukee Bucks as part of a three-way deal that included the Sacramento Kings and Charlotte Bobcats.

=== Return to Washington (2012) ===
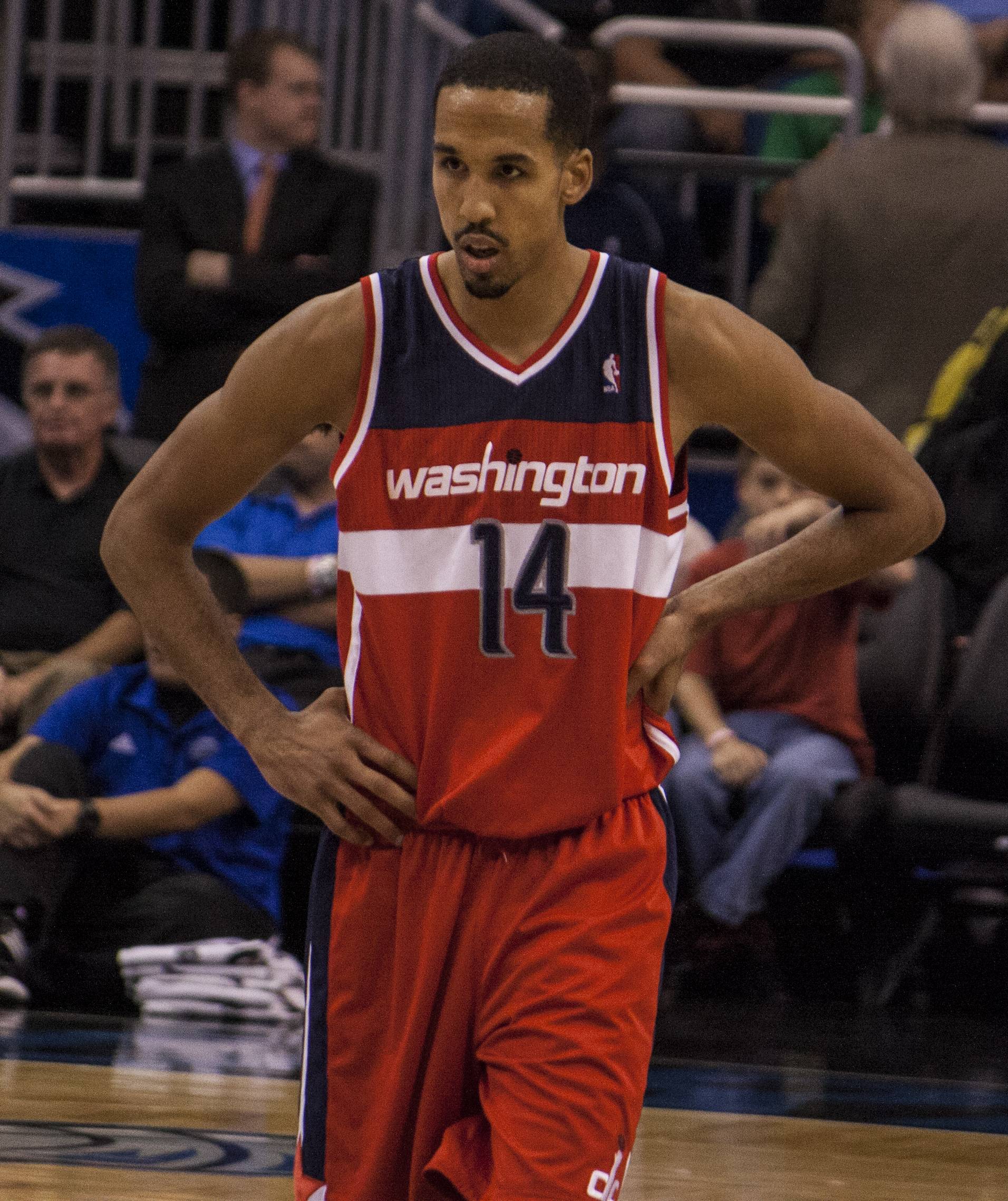
Livingston in 2012

On June 26, 2012, Livingston was traded to the Houston Rockets for Samuel Dalembert along with teammates Jon Leuer and Jon Brockman. However, they were all waived before the beginning of the season. On November 15, Livingston re-signed with the Washington Wizards. He was waived on December 23.

=== Cleveland Cavaliers (2012–2013) ===
On December 25, 2012, the Cleveland Cavaliers claimed Livingston off waivers after releasing Donald Sloan. Livingston made his debut for the Cavaliers on January 2, 2013, recording two points, two rebounds, and one assist in 13 minutes of action off the bench.

=== Brooklyn Nets (2013–2014) ===
On July 11, 2013, Livingston signed with the Brooklyn Nets. His season-high of 23 points came in a 108–98 loss to the Portland Trail Blazers on November 18. Initially billed as a backup, Livingston performed well enough to join Deron Williams in the starting lineup following a season-ending injury to Brook Lopez. With Livingston on the floor, the Nets proved to be 8.5 points per 100 possessions better defensively, and he earned the third-most minutes on the team. On March 17, 2014, Livingston set a career-high for both minutes played and points scored in a season. At the end of the season, he had played in a career-high 76 games (beating a previous high of 61 games) and averaged 8.3 points, 3.2 assists, and 1.2 steals per game.

=== Golden State Warriors (2014–2019) ===
On July 11, 2014, Livingston signed with the Golden State Warriors for a reported three-year, $16 million contract. On August 15, he was ruled out for six to eight weeks after having arthroscopic surgery on the big toe of his right foot. Livingston recovered in time to make his Warriors debut in the season opener and served as a key player off the bench for the Warriors in their run to the 2015 NBA Championship while becoming an integral member of the Warriors dynasty.

In 2015–16, Livingston helped the Warriors win an NBA record 73 games to eclipse the 72 wins set by the 1995–96 Chicago Bulls. During Game 4 of the 2016 Western Conference semi-finals, Livingston was ejected late in the second quarter against the Portland Trail Blazers. He had moved into the starting lineup to accommodate for the injured Stephen Curry. In the Western Conference Finals, the Warriors overcame a 3–1 deficit to defeat the Oklahoma City Thunder in seven games and advance to the 2016 NBA Finals. In Game 1 of the NBA Finals against the Cleveland Cavaliers, Livingston scored a playoff career-high 20 points, leading the Warriors to a 104–89 victory. Despite the Warriors going up 3–1 in the series following a Game 4 victory, they went on to lose the series in seven games.

In 2016–17, Livingston helped the Warriors win the NBA Championship after defeating the Cavaliers 4–1 in the 2017 NBA Finals. The Warriors finished the playoffs with a 16–1 record, the best postseason winning percentage in NBA history.

On July 25, 2017, Livingston re-signed with the Warriors on a three-year, $24 million contract. On December 4, he was suspended for one game without pay for an altercation with game official Courtney Kirkland during a game against the Miami Heat a day earlier. Livingston helped the Warriors win back-to-back titles in 2018 after defeating the Cavaliers in a four-game sweep in the Finals.

In 2019, Livingston played in his fifth straight NBA Finals, where the Warriors lost to the Toronto Raptors in six games. Livingston's final NBA game was in Game 6 of the final series (played on June 13, 2019, with the Warriors losing 114–110), where he recorded six points and a steal in 16 minutes of playing time.

On July 10, 2019, Livingston was waived by the Warriors.

On September 13, 2019, Livingston announced his retirement from the NBA. In a post, Livingston stated: "After 15 years in the NBA, I’m excited, sad, fortunate and grateful all in one breath. Hard to put into a caption all of the emotions it takes to try and accomplish your dreams."

== Post-playing career ==
On September 15, 2020, the Golden State Warriors announced that they had named Livingston as director of players affairs and engagement. He won his fourth NBA championship after the Warriors defeated the Boston Celtics in six games in the 2022 NBA Finals. Livingston left the role on June 20, 2023, citing a desire to spend more time with his family outside of the Bay Area.

== Personal life ==
Livingston is a Lutheran. In April 2016, he donated $1 million to his former grade school, Concordia Lutheran School, in Peoria, Illinois.

== NBA career statistics ==
Legend
GP	Games played	GS	Games started	MPG	Minutes per game
FG%	Field goal percentage	3P%	3-point field goal percentage	FT%	Free throw percentage
RPG	Rebounds per game	APG	Assists per game	SPG	Steals per game
BPG	Blocks per game	PPG	Points per game	**Bold**	Career high
†	Won an NBA championship

=== Regular season ===
Year	Team	GP	GS	MPG	FG%	3P%	FT%	RPG	APG	SPG	BPG	PPG
2004–05	L.A. Clippers	30	15	27.1	.414	.000	.746	3.0	5.0	1.1	.4	7.4
2005–06	L.A. Clippers	61	14	25.0	.427	.125	.688	3.0	4.5	.8	.5	5.8
2006–07	L.A. Clippers	54	31	**29.8**	.463	.313	.707	**3.4**	**5.1**	1.1	.5	**9.3**
2008–09	Miami	4	0	10.3	.375	.000	.750	.5	1.0	.5	.0	2.3
2008–09	Oklahoma City	8	1	23.8	.538	.000	**1.000**	3.3	2.0	.6	.3	7.8
2009–10	Oklahoma City	10	0	13.0	.313	.000	.000	2.0	1.3	.5	.2	1.0
2009–10	Washington	26	18	25.6	.535	.000	.875	2.2	4.5	.5	.3	9.2
2010–11	Charlotte	73	0	17.3	.466	.250	.864	2.0	2.2	.6	.4	6.6
2011–12	Milwaukee	58	27	18.8	.469	**.667**	.785	2.1	2.1	.5	.3	5.5
2012–13	Washington	17	4	18.8	.364	.000	**1.000**	2.2	2.2	.6	.1	3.7
2012–13	Cleveland	49	12	23.2	.507	.000	.843	2.5	3.6	.8	**.6**	7.2
2013–14	Brooklyn	76	**54**	26.0	.483	.167	.827	3.2	3.2	**1.2**	.4	8.3
2014–15†	Golden State	**78**	2	18.8	.500	.000	.714	2.2	3.3	.6	.3	5.9
2015–16	Golden State	**78**	3	19.5	.536	.167	.860	2.2	3.0	.7	.3	6.3
2016–17†	Golden State	76	3	17.7	**.547**	.333	.700	2.0	1.8	.5	.3	5.1
2017–18†	Golden State	71	7	15.9	.501	.000	.820	1.8	2.0	.5	.3	5.5
2018–19	Golden State	64	0	15.1	.519	.000	.784	1.8	1.8	.5	.4	4.0
Career		833	191	20.6	.486	.178	.794	2.4	3.0	.7	.4	6.3

=== Playoffs ===
Year	Team	GP	GS	MPG	FG%	3P%	FT%	RPG	APG	SPG	BPG	PPG
2006	L.A. Clippers	12	0	**27.7**	.474	**1.000**	.810	**4.7**	**4.8**	**.6**	**.5**	7.5
2014	Brooklyn	12	**10**	27.1	.512	**1.000**	.730	3.5	3.3	.4	.4	**9.7**
2015†	Golden State	21	0	17.9	.532	.000	.840	2.4	1.8	.4	.2	5.0
2016	Golden State	**24**	7	21.4	.488	.000	.865	3.2	3.3	.5	.2	8.2
2017†	Golden State	14	0	15.7	**.576**	.000	.714	2.1	1.4	.4	.1	5.2
2018†	Golden State	21	0	17.2	.536	.000	**.880**	2.2	1.5	.3	.0	6.7
2019	Golden State	22	2	14.6	.453	.000	.840	1.4	1.4	.5	.2	4.0
Career		126	19	19.4	.507	.286	.819	2.6	2.4	.4	.2	6.4

Awards and achievements
Preceded by Shannon Brown	Illinois Mr. Basketball Award Winner; 2004	Succeeded by Julian Wright
