= Bruce Fraser (basketball) =

American basketball player and coach

- Fraser in 2023

Golden State Warriors
- Position: Assistant coach
- League: NBA

Personal information
- Born: December 18, 1964 (age 61) Long Beach, California, U.S.
- Listed height: 6 ft 5 in (1.96 m)
- Listed weight: 172 lb (78 kg)

Career information
- High school: Woodrow Wilson Classical (Long Beach, California)
- College: Long Beach CC (1983–1984); Arizona (1984–1987)
- Coaching career: 1988–present

Career history

Coaching
- 1987–1990: Arizona (assistant)
- 1994–1995: Indiana Pacers (assistant)
- 1999–2000: Missouri (assistant)
- 2014–present: Golden State Warriors (assistant)

Career highlights
- As assistant coach: 4× NBA champion (2015, 2017, 2018, 2022)

Bruce T. Fraser (born December 18, 1964), nicknamed "Q", is an American basketball coach who is an assistant coach for player development for the Golden State Warriors of the National Basketball Association (NBA). He played college basketball for the Arizona Wildcats.

== Early life ==
Fraser was born and grew up in Long Beach, California, in a basketball family. Fraser's father, Bill Fraser, was a basketball coach for Wilson High School in Long Beach, the same high school Bruce later attended, for more than 15 years. In 1973, Bill replaced famed coach Lute Olson as the head coach for Long Beach City College, and would eventually become the college's winningest head coach by the time he retired in 1990.

== College and early career ==
Fraser played basketball for the Long Beach City College team, coached by his father, for one year before transferring to the University of Arizona in 1984. He was the backup point guard for Arizona's basketball team for three years, from 1984 to 1987, before going into coaching upon graduation. Arizona was in the midst of a period of success on the national level under longtime head coach Lute Olson. In Arizona, Fraser saw little playing time as a reserve, but became known as a team player. Because he typically played short minutes late in games, Fraser referred to himself as a "Gumby" for his stiffness, and began carrying a small Gumby doll in his sock as a charm during games. Eventually, the entire Arizona bench in this era became known collectively as "Gumbies", taking on Fraser's label, and known for their exuberance. Also in Arizona, Fraser met and played alongside Steve Kerr, where they became close friends. Kerr reportedly gave Fraser his nickname, "Q", abbreviated from "Question Man", because he asked so many questions during his first week.

After graduating, Fraser served as a graduate assistant for Arizona under coach Lute Olson from 1987 to 1989, including for the top-seeded 1988 team that made Arizona's first Final Four appearance. Fraser later recalled that appearance as his favorite memory during his time in Arizona.

After leaving Arizona, Fraser left basketball and returned to the Los Angeles area spending 3 years working in sound and music for 20th Century Fox. Fraser worked on such films as Home Alone and Schindler's List.

While visiting friend and former Arizona basketball teammate Sean Elliott during his tenure for the San Antonio Spurs, Fraser was introduced to then-head coach—and future Hall of Famer—Larry Brown. Missing basketball, Fraser returned to the sport with his first NBA job as a volunteer coach under Brown, now coaching the Indiana Pacers, for the 1994–1995 season that ended with an Eastern Conference Finals appearance.

After his season with the Pacers, Fraser moved on to leverage his knowledge of the basketball world as the sports marketing manager for Oakley from 1995 to May 1999. Fraser managed many high-profile accounts for Oakley, including Michael Jordan and Alonzo Mourning, as well as leading the company's relationships with many college athletics departments.

Fraser joined the University of Missouri coaching staff as an assistant coach for the 1999–2000 season under head coach Quin Snyder.

== NBA career ==
In 2004, Fraser joined the Phoenix Suns as a scout, reuniting with former Arizona teammate Steve Kerr, who was part of the team's new ownership group and later became general manager. As scout, Fraser was primarily responsible for scouting the west coast college players for the Suns. After several years as scout, Fraser, a former point guard himself, also became the personal coach and workout partner for Steve Nash under Kerr's management. According to Kerr, Fraser trained Nash over summers during the last four years of Nash's NBA playing career.

In May 2014, Kerr was hired as head coach for the Golden State Warriors. Kerr brought on an entirely new coaching staff, and on July 3, 2014, the team announced Fraser was being hired as an assistant coach. As the player development coach, Fraser's primary role is working with players on improving skills. With his experience working with Nash, a top point guard, one of Fraser's main roles has been working out with Stephen Curry. Curry—widely considered the best shooter in NBA history—works with Fraser after every practice, especially focusing on the mechanics of his shot; Fraser typically works with Curry on the court, including facilitating Curry's workout routine of taking 500 3-point shots every practice. Fraser was also described as the "emotional barometer of the team", and sees himself as tracking the team's mental state and able to communicate the feelings of the team to Kerr, due to their closeness. All of the Warriors assistant coaches share advance scouting duties for the other NBA teams of upcoming games, with Fraser responsible for six teams.

Fraser won his first NBA Championship with the 2014–2015 Warriors team, which defeated the Cleveland Cavaliers 4–2 in the NBA Finals.

In September 2015, it was reported that Steve Nash was joining the Warriors as a player development consultant to work alongside Fraser training Curry and other guards. Nash's friendship with Fraser and Kerr from their time in Phoenix was important in attracting him to Golden State.

Fraser won his second NBA Championship in three years with the 2016–2017 Warriors team, which defeated the Cleveland Cavaliers 4–1 in the NBA Finals.

Fraser won his third NBA Championship in four years with the 2017–2018 Warriors team, which defeated the Cleveland Cavaliers 4–0 in the NBA Finals.

Fraser won his fourth NBA Championship with the 2021–2022 Warriors team, which defeated the Boston Celtics 4–2 in the NBA Finals.

Fraser currently lives in San Diego, as does fellow Warriors coach Steve Kerr.
