= Ron Adams =

American basketball coach

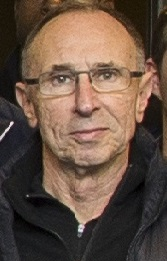
- Adams in 2015

Golden State Warriors
- Title: Assistant coach
- League: NBA

Personal information
- Born: November 18, 1947 (age 79) Laton, California, U.S.

Career information
- High school: Laton (Laton, California)
- College: Fresno Pacific (1965–1969)
- Position: Guard
- Coaching career: 1969–present

Career history

Coaching
- 1969–1972: Fresno Pacific (assistant)
- 1972–1975: Fresno Pacific
- 1975–1976: U.S. International (assistant)
- 1976–1978: UC Santa Barbara (assistant)
- 1978–1979: Sunair Ostende
- 1980–1986: Fresno State (assistant)
- 1986–1990: Fresno State
- 1990–1991: UNLV (assistant)
- 1991–1992: Drake (assistant)
- 1992–1994: San Antonio Spurs (assistant)
- 1994–1996: Philadelphia 76ers (assistant)
- 1998–2003: Milwaukee Bucks (assistant)
- 2003–2008: Chicago Bulls (assistant)
- 2008–2010: Oklahoma City Thunder (assistant)
- 2010–2013: Chicago Bulls (assistant)
- 2013–2014: Boston Celtics (assistant)
- 2014–present: Golden State Warriors (assistant)

Career highlights
- As head coach: Belgian Cup champion (1979); As assistant coach: 4× NBA champion (2015, 2017, 2018, 2022); NIT champion (1983); 4× PCAA/Big West tournament champion (1981, 1982, 1984, 1991); 2022 Tex Winter Assistant Coach Lifetime Impact Award

Ronald George Adams (born November 18, 1947) is an American basketball coach who has been an assistant coach for the Golden State Warriors of the National Basketball Association (NBA) since 2014.

== Early life and college career ==
A native of Laton, California, Adams graduated from Laton High School. He then played basketball at Fresno Pacific College (now Fresno Pacific University) as a guard for the Fresno Pacific Vikings and graduated in 1969 with a bachelor's degree in political science and history. On September 19, 2011, Adams was inducted into the Fresno Pacific University Athletic Hall of Fame. Adams played basketball at Fresno Pacific (1965–69) and began his coaching career there as well (1969–74).

== Coaching career ==
After graduating from Fresno Pacific College, Adams became an assistant coach for the basketball team in 1969. Following a 7–20 season in 1971–72, Adams was promoted to be head coach. Fresno Pacific went 19–7 in 1973–74, Adams's second season as head coach. While head coach at Fresno Pacific, Adams completed a master's degree in physical education at California State University, Fresno in 1974.

In 1975, Adams became assistant coach at United States International University. Then from 1976 to 1978, Adams was assistant coach at UC Santa Barbara. He moved up to the professional level, as head coach for Belgian team Sunair Ostende in the 1978–79 season.

From 1980 to 1986, Adams was an assistant coach at Fresno State under Boyd Grant. During this time, Fresno State won the PCAA Tournaments of 1981, 1982, and 1984. Adams took over as head coach after Grant resigned following the 1985–86 season. Adams's best season at Fresno State was a 15–14 season in 1988–89; in four seasons, Adams went 43–72.

In 1990, Adams joined Jerry Tarkanian's staff at UNLV, who followed its championship season with an undefeated Big West Conference regular season record and berth in the 1991 Final Four. Adams then was an assistant at Drake for one season, then reunited with Tarkanian to be an assistant under him with the NBA's San Antonio Spurs in 1992. After two seasons, Adams joined John Lucas II's staff on the Philadelphia 76ers as assistant coach in 1994. From 1996 to 1998, Adams was a player personnel scout for the Portland Trail Blazers.

In 1998, Adams became an assistant coach for the Milwaukee Bucks under George Karl. After five seasons in Milwaukee, Adams became assistant coach for the Chicago Bulls, mostly under Scott Skiles. He then was assistant for the Oklahoma City Thunder under Scott Brooks from 2008 to 2010. Afterwards, Adams rejoined the Bulls in 2010 as assistant coach this time under Tom Thibodeau. Following three seasons with the Bulls, Adams became an assistant coach for the Boston Celtics in 2013, under first-year head coach Brad Stevens.

On July 3, 2014, Adams joined the Golden State Warriors as an assistant coach under first-year head coach Steve Kerr. The Warriors finished the regular season 67–15 and in first place in the Western Conference. Adams won his first championship after the Warriors defeated the Cleveland Cavaliers in six games of the 2015 NBA Finals.

Adams is considered one of the top defensive coaches. He was inducted into the Fresno County Athletic Hall of Fame, for coaching basketball, in 2016.

The Warriors finished the regular season 2016-17 NBA season with 67 wins and first place in the Western Conference. Adams won his second championship in three years after the Warriors defeated the Cleveland Cavaliers in five games of the 2017 NBA Finals.

The Warriors finished the regular season 2017-18 NBA season with 58 wins and second place in the Western Conference. Adams won his second straight championship when the Warriors defeated the Cleveland Cavaliers in four games of the 2018 NBA Finals.

The Warriors finished the regular season 2021-22 NBA season with 53 wins and third place in the Western Conference. Adams won his fourth championship when the Warriors defeated the Boston Celtics in six games of the 2022 NBA Finals.

== Head coaching record ==
Record table
Season	Team	Overall	Conference	Standing	Postseason
Fresno Pacific Sunbirds (NAIA District 3) (1972–1975)
1972–73	Fresno Pacific	16–13			
1973–74	Fresno Pacific	19–7			
1974–75	Fresno Pacific	9–16			
Fresno Pacific:		44–36 (.550)			
Fresno State Bulldogs (Pacific Coast Athletic Association/Big West Conference) (1986–1990)
1986–87	Fresno State	9–20	4–14	10th	
1987–88	Fresno State	9–19	6–12	9th	
1988–89	Fresno State	15–14	9–9	7th	
1989–90	Fresno State	10–19	4–14	9th	
Fresno State:		43–72 (.374)	23–49 (.319)		
Total:		87–108 (.446)			
