= List of NBA longest losing streaks =

This is a list of the longest regular season losing streaks in National Basketball Association (NBA) history. Streaks started at the end of one season are carried over into the following season. The Detroit Pistons and the Philadelphia 76ers are tied for the longest ever losing streak, losing 28 straight games. The 2023–24 Detroit Pistons have the longest losing streak in a single season, while the Philadelphia 76ers lost 28 consecutive games across two seasons: 2014–15 and 2015–16.

== Key ==
^	Denotes streaks that spanned over two seasons
	Denotes streaks that are currently in progress

For tiebreakers, precedence is given to single season streaks over multi-season streaks; otherwise ties are listed in chronological order with earliest occurrence listed first.

== Streak ==
=== Regular season ===
This list contains only the top 25 streaks consisting entirely of regular season games. Streaks that spanned consecutive seasons are included as well.

Rank	Games	Team	Season(s)	Season record(s)	Date	Score	Opponent	Date	Score	Opponent
Rank	Games	Team	Season(s)	Season record(s)	Beginning (first defeat)			End (first victory)		
1 (tie)	28	Detroit Pistons	2023–24	14–68	October 30, 2023	112–124	Oklahoma City Thunder	December 30, 2023	129–127	Toronto Raptors
1 (tie)	28 (10 + 18)	Philadelphia 76ers^	2014–15; 2015–16	18–64; 10–72	March 27, 2015	98–119	Los Angeles Clippers	December 1, 2015	103–91	Los Angeles Lakers
3 (tie)	26	Cleveland Cavaliers	2010–11	19–63	December 20, 2010	90–101	Utah Jazz	February 11, 2011	126–119	Los Angeles Clippers
3 (tie)	26	Philadelphia 76ers	2013–14	19–63	January 31, 2014	99–125	Atlanta Hawks	March 29, 2014	123–98	Detroit Pistons
5	24 (19 + 5)	Cleveland Cavaliers^	1981–82; 1982–83	15–67; 23–59	March 19, 1982	97–119	Milwaukee Bucks	November 10, 1982	132–120	Golden State Warriors
6 (tie)	23	Vancouver Grizzlies	1995–96	15–67	February 16, 1996	100–110	Atlanta Hawks	April 3, 1996	105–103	Minnesota Timberwolves
6 (tie)	23	Denver Nuggets	1997–98	11–71	December 9, 1997	83–92	Detroit Pistons	January 24, 1998	99–81	Los Angeles Clippers
6 (tie)	23	Charlotte Bobcats	2011–12	7–59	March 19, 2012	80–105	Philadelphia 76ers	November 2, 2012	90–89	Indiana Pacers
9	21 (14 + 7)	Detroit Pistons^	1979–80; 1980–81	16–66; 21–61	March 7, 1980	105–106	Washington Bullets	October 25, 1980	112–109	Houston Rockets
10 (tie)	20	Philadelphia 76ers	1972–73	9–73	January 9, 1973	110–126	Chicago Bulls	February 14, 1973	106–104	Milwaukee Bucks
10 (tie)	20	Dallas Mavericks	1993–94	13–69	November 13, 1993	100–101	Utah Jazz	December 23, 1993	93–89	Minnesota Timberwolves
10 (tie)	20	Houston Rockets	2020–21	17–55	February 6, 2021	106–111	San Antonio Spurs	March 22, 2021	117–99	Toronto Raptors
10 (tie)	20 (12 + 8)	New York Knicks^	1984–85; 1985–86	24–58; 23–59	March 23, 1985	105–113	Kansas City Kings	November 12, 1985	103–93	Phoenix Suns
10 (tie)	20 (4 + 16)	Los Angeles Clippers^	1993–94; 1994–95	27–55; 17–65	April 18, 1994	131–134	Golden State Warriors	December 7, 1994	96–94	Milwaukee Bucks
15 (tie)	19	San Diego Clippers	1981–82	17–65	March 11, 1982	107–113	Kansas City Kings	April 15, 1982	129–123	Portland Trail Blazers
15 (tie)	19	Los Angeles Clippers	1988–89	21–61	December 30, 1988	109–124	Los Angeles Lakers	February 8, 1989	114–111	Houston Rockets
15 (tie)	19	Dallas Mavericks	1992–93	11–71	February 6, 1993	93–111	Denver Nuggets	March 17, 1993	102–96	Orlando Magic
15 (tie)	19	Vancouver Grizzlies	1995–96	15–67	November 7, 1995	88–99	Dallas Mavericks	December 15, 1995	104–100	Portland Trail Blazers
15 (tie)	19	Orlando Magic	2003–04	21–61	October 30, 2003	98–100	New Orleans Hornets	December 8, 2003	105–98	Phoenix Suns
15 (tie)	19	Memphis Grizzlies	2017–18	22–60	January 31, 2018	101–105	Indiana Pacers	March 17, 2018	101–94	Denver Nuggets
15 (tie)	19 (4 + 15)	Philadelphia 76ers^	1971–72; 1972–73	30–52; 9–73	March 21, 1972	111–117	Atlanta Hawks	November 11, 1972	114–112	Houston Rockets
15 (tie)	19 (1 + 18)	New Jersey Nets^	2008–09; 2009–10	34–48; 12–70	April 15, 2009	73–102	New York Knicks	December 4, 2009	97–91	Charlotte Bobcats
23 (tie)	18	Utah Jazz	1981–82	25–57	February 24, 1982	90–132	Boston Celtics	April 2, 1982	127–118	Kansas City Kings
23 (tie)	18	Boston Celtics	2006–07	24–58	January 7, 2007	79–87	Orlando Magic	February 14, 2007	117–97	Milwaukee Bucks
23 (tie)	18	Charlotte Bobcats	2012–13	21–61	November 26, 2012	69–114	Oklahoma City Thunder	December 31, 2012	91–81	Chicago Bulls
23 (tie)	18	New York Knicks	2018–19	17–65	January 4, 2019	112–119	Los Angeles Lakers	February 16, 2019	106–91	Atlanta Hawks
23 (tie)	18	San Antonio Spurs	2023–24	22–60	November 5, 2023	116–123	Toronto Raptors	December 15, 2023	129–115	Los Angeles Lakers
23 (tie)	18 (15 + 3)	Minnesota Timberwolves^	2010–11; 2011–12	17–65; 26–40	March 13, 2011	77–100	Golden State Warriors	January 1, 2012	99–82	Dallas Mavericks

=== Playoffs ===
This list contains only the top 10 streaks consisting entirely of postseason games. All the streaks spanned multiple postseasons.

Rank	Games	Team	Season started	Season ended	Number of years	Date	Score	Opponent	Date	Score	Opponent
Rank	Games	Team	Season started	Season ended	Number of years	Beginning (first defeat)			End (first victory)		
1	15	Detroit Pistons	2007–08	2024–25	17	May 28, 2008	102–106	Boston Celtics	April 21, 2025	100–94	New York Knicks
2	13	New York Knicks	2000–01	2011–12	11	May 2, 2001	93–100	Toronto Raptors	May 6, 2012	89–87	Miami Heat
3 (tie)	12	Memphis Grizzlies	2003–04	2010–11	7	April 17, 2004	74–98	San Antonio Spurs	April 17, 2011	101–98	San Antonio Spurs
3 (tie)	12	Charlotte Bobcats/Hornets	2001–02^{[A]}	2015–16	14	May 12, 2002	79–89	New Jersey Nets	April 23, 2016	96–80	Miami Heat
5 (tie)	11	Baltimore Bullets	1964–65	1969–70	5	April 11, 1965	112–120	Los Angeles Lakers	March 29, 1970	127–113	New York Knicks
5 (tie)	11	Denver Nuggets	1987–88	1993–94	6	May 15, 1988	103–124	Dallas Mavericks	May 2, 1994	110–93	Seattle SuperSonics
7 (tie)	10	New Jersey Nets	1983–84	1991–92	8	May 8, 1984	82–94	Milwaukee Bucks	April 28, 1992	109–104	Cleveland Cavaliers
7 (tie)	10	Kansas City/ Sacramento Kings	1980–81	1995–96	15	April 24, 1981	88–92	Houston Rockets	April 28, 1996	90–81	Seattle SuperSonics
7 (tie)	10	Portland Trail Blazers	1999–00	2002–03	3	June 4, 2000	84–89	Los Angeles Lakers	April 27, 2003	98–79	Dallas Mavericks
7 (tie)	10	Portland Trail Blazers	2015–16	2018–19	3	May 9, 2016	125–132	Golden State Warriors	April 14, 2019	104–99	Oklahoma City Thunder
7 (tie)	10	Indiana Pacers	2017–18	2023–24	6	April 29, 2018	101–105	Cleveland Cavaliers	April 23, 2024	125–108	Milwaukee Bucks
7 (tie)	10	Brooklyn Nets	2020–21	active		June 17, 2021	89–104	Milwaukee Bucks			
7 (tie)	10	Phoenix Suns	2022–23	active		May 9, 2023	102–118	Denver Nuggets			

== See also ==
- List of NBA longest winning streaks
- List of NBA teams by single season win percentage
- NBA records

== Notes ==
- ^{A} Final season of the original Charlotte Hornets. Later moved to New Orleans and renamed the Pelicans. As part of a deal with the NBA and the Pelicans, the current Hornets, formerly the Charlotte Bobcats, reclaimed the history and records of the 1988–2002 Hornets, while all of the Hornets' records during their time in New Orleans from 2002 to 2013 remained with the Pelicans.
