= 2017 NBA Finals =

2017 basketball championship series

- The wordmark of the NBA Finals (2003–2017)
Team	Coach	Wins
Golden State Warriors	Steve Kerr	4
Cleveland Cavaliers	Tyronn Lue	1
- Dates: June 1–12
- MVP: Kevin Durant (Golden State Warriors)
- Hall of Famers: Officials: Danny Crawford (2025)
- Eastern finals: Cavaliers defeated Celtics, 4–1
- Western finals: Warriors defeated Spurs, 4–0

The 2017 NBA Finals was the championship series of the National Basketball Association's (NBA) 2016–17 season and conclusion of the season's playoffs. In this best-of-seven series, and a rematch of the 2016 NBA Finals, the Western Conference champion Golden State Warriors defeated the Eastern Conference champion and defending champion Cleveland Cavaliers four games to one for their second title in three years, and fifth overall. Golden State's Kevin Durant was unanimously voted the NBA Finals Most Valuable Player (MVP), after averaging 35.2 points, 8.2 rebounds, and 5.4 assists. The series began on June 1 and ended on June 12.

With a 12–0 record in the first three rounds of the playoffs, the Warriors were undefeated entering the series while the Cavaliers, with ambitions of repeating as NBA champions, entered with a 12–1 record. This marked the first time in NBA history that the same two teams played in three consecutive Finals, having previously met in 2015 and 2016. The Warriors won the first three games, giving them a 15–0 record, the most consecutive postseason wins in NBA history. They bounced back in Game 5 after losing to the Cavaliers in Game 4, eventually finishing the postseason 16–1 (.941), the best winning percentage in NBA playoff history.

== Background ==
=== Golden State Warriors ===
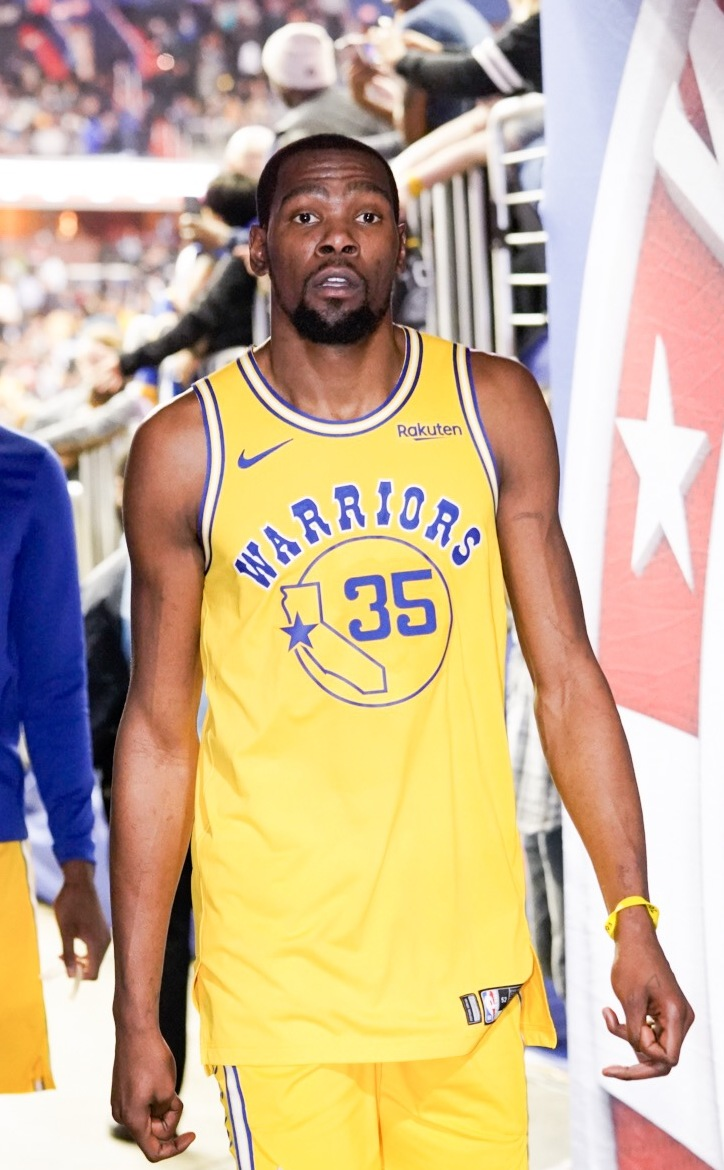
Kevin Durant joined the Golden State Warriors in 2016 and later won his first NBA Finals MVP Award during the first season with the team

This was the Golden State Warriors' third consecutive trip to the NBA Finals and ninth appearance overall, having come short of back-to-back titles in the 2016 NBA Finals by losing in seven games after having a 3–1 lead. With the acquisition of free agent superstar Kevin Durant in the offseason, the Warriors were hailed as a "Superteam" by the media and fans, forming a new All-Star "Big Four" led by Kevin Durant, Stephen Curry, Klay Thompson, and Draymond Green.

The team equaled their 2014–15 regular-season record of 67–15, their second most wins in franchise history. They won the Pacific Division title and Western Conference Championship for the third consecutive season. The club became the fastest team in NBA history to clinch a playoff berth, achieving the feat on February 25, 2017, two days earlier than last season when they clinched on February 27, 2016. They also became the first team in NBA playoff history to start 12–0, sweeping the Portland Trail Blazers in the first round, the Utah Jazz in the Western Conference semifinals, and the San Antonio Spurs in the Western Conference finals. Entering the Finals, this twelve game win-streak tied third for the most consecutive wins in the postseason. The Warriors also entered the Finals with the largest playoff points differential in NBA history, with a +16.3 winning margin per game.

=== Cleveland Cavaliers ===
This was the Cleveland Cavaliers' third consecutive trip to the NBA Finals, and fourth appearance overall, seeking to repeat as NBA champions. This was also the seventh consecutive NBA Finals appearance for LeBron James, and the sixth for James Jones (who technically qualified for the 2011 NBA Finals along with James, but did not play).

The Cavaliers finished the 2016–17 regular season with a 51–31 record, securing the #2-seed in the Eastern Conference. In the playoffs, the Cavaliers swept the Indiana Pacers in the first round, swept the Toronto Raptors in the Eastern Conference semifinals, and defeated the Boston Celtics in five games in the Eastern Conference finals.

=== Road to the Finals ===
Cleveland Cavaliers (Eastern Conference champion)		Golden State Warriors (Western Conference champion)
Eastern Conference: # / Team / W / L / PCT / GB / GP; 1 / c – Boston Celtics * / 53 / 29 / .646 / – / 82; 2 / y – Cleveland Cavaliers * / 51 / 31 / .622 / 2.0 / 82; 3 / x – Toronto Raptors / 51 / 31 / .622 / 2.0 / 82; 4 / y – Washington Wizards * / 49 / 33 / .598 / 4.0 / 82; 5 / x – Atlanta Hawks / 43 / 39 / .524 / 10.0 / 82; 6 / x – Milwaukee Bucks / 42 / 40 / .512 / 11.0 / 82; 7 / x – Indiana Pacers / 42 / 40 / .512 / 11.0 / 82; 8 / x – Chicago Bulls / 41 / 41 / .500 / 12.0 / 82; 9 / Miami Heat / 41 / 41 / .500 / 12.0 / 82; 10 / Detroit Pistons / 37 / 45 / .451 / 16.0 / 82; 11 / Charlotte Hornets / 36 / 46 / .439 / 17.0 / 82; 12 / New York Knicks / 31 / 51 / .378 / 22.0 / 82; 13 / Orlando Magic / 29 / 53 / .354 / 24.0 / 82; 14 / Philadelphia 76ers / 28 / 54 / .341 / 25.0 / 82; 15 / Brooklyn Nets / 20 / 62 / .244 / 33.0 / 82; 2nd seed in the East, 5th best league record	Regular season	Western Conference: # / Team / W / L / PCT / GB / GP; 1 / z – Golden State Warriors * / 67 / 15 / .817 / – / 82; 2 / y – San Antonio Spurs * / 61 / 21 / .744 / 6.0 / 82; 3 / x – Houston Rockets / 55 / 27 / .671 / 12.0 / 82; 4 / x – Los Angeles Clippers / 51 / 31 / .622 / 16.0 / 82; 5 / y – Utah Jazz * / 51 / 31 / .622 / 16.0 / 82; 6 / x – Oklahoma City Thunder / 47 / 35 / .573 / 20.0 / 82; 7 / x – Memphis Grizzlies / 43 / 39 / .524 / 24.0 / 82; 8 / x – Portland Trail Blazers / 41 / 41 / .500 / 26.0 / 82; 9 / e – Denver Nuggets / 40 / 42 / .488 / 27.0 / 82; 10 / e – New Orleans Pelicans / 34 / 48 / .415 / 33.0 / 82; 11 / e – Dallas Mavericks / 33 / 49 / .402 / 34.0 / 82; 12 / e – Sacramento Kings / 32 / 50 / .390 / 35.0 / 82; 13 / e – Minnesota Timberwolves / 31 / 51 / .378 / 36.0 / 82; 14 / e – Los Angeles Lakers / 26 / 56 / .317 / 41.0 / 82; 15 / e – Phoenix Suns / 24 / 58 / .293 / 43.0 / 82; 1st seed in the West, best league record
Defeated the 7th seeded Indiana Pacers, 4–0	First round	Defeated the 8th seeded Portland Trail Blazers, 4–0
Defeated the 3rd seeded Toronto Raptors, 4–0	Conference semifinals	Defeated the 5th seeded Utah Jazz, 4–0
Defeated the 1st seeded Boston Celtics, 4–1	Conference finals	Defeated the 2nd seeded San Antonio Spurs, 4–0

=== Regular season series ===
The Warriors and Cavaliers tied the regular season series 1–1, with each team winning its home game.

December 25, 2016

Recap

Golden State Warriors 108, Cleveland Cavaliers 109

Quicken Loans Arena, Cleveland, Ohio

January 16, 2017

Recap

Cleveland Cavaliers 91, Golden State Warriors 126

Oracle Arena, Oakland, California

With 3.4 seconds left, Kyrie Irving hit another clutch jump shot to defeat the Warriors in Christmas 2016 in the two teams first match-up since the 2016 NBA Finals. The Cavs were also down by 14 early in the fourth quarter. Golden State had one last chance, but free-agent signee Kevin Durant, lost the ball before getting a shot off. Postgame, Durant stated he felt he was fouled on the last play by Richard Jefferson.

== Series summary ==
Game	Date	Road team	Result	Home team
Game 1	June 1	Cleveland Cavaliers	91–113 (0–1)	Golden State Warriors
Game 2	June 4	Cleveland Cavaliers	113–132 (0–2)	Golden State Warriors
Game 3	June 7	Golden State Warriors	118–113 (3–0)	Cleveland Cavaliers
Game 4	June 9	Golden State Warriors	116–137 (3–1)	Cleveland Cavaliers
Game 5	June 12	Cleveland Cavaliers	120–129 (1–4)	Golden State Warriors

== Game summaries ==
=== Game 1 ===
ABC

June 1
9:00 pm (6:00 pm PDT)

Boxscore

Cleveland Cavaliers 91, Golden State Warriors 113
Scoring by quarter: 30–35, 22–25, 20–33, 19–20
Pts: LeBron James 28; Rebs: Kevin Love 21; Asts: LeBron James 8	Pts: Kevin Durant 38; Rebs: Draymond Green 11; Asts: Stephen Curry 10
Golden State leads series, 1–0

Oracle Arena, Oakland, California
Attendance: 19,596
Referees:
- No. 43 Dan Crawford
- No. 9 Derrick Stafford
- No. 15 Zach Zarba

The Warriors routed the Cavaliers 113–91 to take a 1–0 series lead. The Warriors led by only eight points at halftime (60–52), but they opened the third quarter on a 13–0 run and never looked back. Kevin Durant had 38 points to lead the Warriors, and Stephen Curry added 28 points. For Cleveland, LeBron James also had 28 points, becoming the first player to score 6,000 career points in the postseason. He also passed Reggie Miller for second all-time in postseason three-pointers made. James grabbed 15 rebounds and dished out eight assists, but he committed eight of the Cavaliers' 20 turnovers. Golden State as a team managed only half of James' total with four turnovers, equaling the NBA record for fewest turnovers in an NBA Finals game. With this victory, the Warriors became the first team ever to start 13–0 in the playoffs and their current 13 game win-streak is tied for the most consecutive postseason wins in NBA history. Former Cavaliers head coach and current Warriors interim head coach Mike Brown took charge of the game, with Steve Kerr still being out due to illness.

The Cavaliers became the first team in NBA Finals history to fail to record a steal in a game. With the loss, the Cavaliers' nine game road playoff winning streak (a streak that began when they won Game 5 of the 2016 NBA Finals) came to an end. James dropped to 1–7 in NBA Finals openers in his career.

=== Game 2 ===
ABC

June 4
8:00 pm (5:00 pm PDT)

Boxscore

Cleveland Cavaliers 113, Golden State Warriors 132
Scoring by quarter: 34–40, 30–27, 24–35, 25–30
Pts: LeBron James 29; Rebs: LeBron James 11; Asts: LeBron James 14	Pts: Kevin Durant 33; Rebs: Kevin Durant 13; Asts: Stephen Curry 11
Golden State leads series, 2–0

Oracle Arena, Oakland, California
Attendance: 19,596
Referees:
- No. 48 Scott Foster
- No. 25 Tony Brothers
- No. 19 James Capers

The Warriors won Game 2 over the Cavaliers, 132–113, to improve their best start in NBA playoff history to 14–0. Their 14-game winning streak is the longest postseason win streak in NBA history. Golden State surpassed Cleveland's 13 game win-streak, which dated back to Game 5 of the 2016 Finals. The Warriors also hit an NBA Finals record 18 three-pointers on 43 attempts, with Stephen Curry, Klay Thompson, and Kevin Durant hitting four threes apiece and Draymond Green connecting on a three of his own from behind the arc. Warriors head coach Steve Kerr returned from illness to coach from the sideline for the first time since April 19, 2017. In what was a high scoring affair for both teams, the Warriors held a slim three-point lead (67–64) at halftime and a four-point lead (86–82) past the midway point of the third quarter before outscoring the Cavaliers 35–17 through the middle of the fourth quarter. LeBron James led Cleveland with 29 points while grabbing 11 rebounds and dishing out 14 assists, and Kevin Love and Kyrie Irving added 27 and 19 points, respectively.

For the Warriors, Durant scored 33 points with 13 rebounds, while Curry had 32 points to go along with 10 rebounds and 11 assists. With his eighth triple-double of the Finals, James moved into a tie with Magic Johnson for the most Finals triple-doubles in the league. Game 2 was the first postseason game since 1970 where two opposing players each had a triple-double. Golden State took a 2–0 series lead heading into Cleveland for Game 3.

=== Game 3 ===
ABC

June 7
9:00 pm

Boxscore

Golden State Warriors 118, Cleveland Cavaliers 113
Scoring by quarter: 39–32, 28–29, 22–33, 29–19
Pts: Kevin Durant 31; Rebs: Stephen Curry 13; Asts: Draymond Green 7	Pts: LeBron James 39; Rebs: Kevin Love 13; Asts: LeBron James 9
Golden State leads series, 3–0

Quicken Loans Arena, Cleveland, Ohio
Attendance: 20,562
Referees:
- No. 13 Monty McCutchen
- No. 14 Ed Malloy
- No. 41 Ken Mauer

The Warriors defeated the Cavaliers 118–113 to extend the longest winning streak in NBA playoff history to 15 games. Golden State became the first team in the four major sports leagues in North America to go 15–0 in the postseason. The Warriors got off to a blistering start, hitting an NBA Finals record nine three-pointers in the first quarter, resulting in an early 39–32 lead. During the quarter, the Cavaliers got a scare when LeBron James bumped into his teammate Tristan Thompson trying to guard Klay Thompson, but James stayed in the game. The Warriors finished the first half making 12 three-pointers, another NBA Finals record for most threes in a half and led by six points at halftime (67–61). However, the Cavaliers started to show some life to start the third quarter, going on a 10–2 run to lead 71–69. They led 94–89 after three quarters of play and 113–107 with 2:32 remaining in the fourth quarter, but the Warriors scored 11 unanswered points to steal the road win and take a commanding 3–0 series lead heading into Game 4. During the game-ending run, Kevin Durant drilled the go-ahead three-pointer for Golden State with 45.3 seconds remaining and Iguodala blocked LeBron James' potential game-tying 3.

Durant led the Warriors with 31 points, going 4-for-7 from behind the arc that included the winning basket. Klay Thompson added 30 points on 6-of-11 shooting from three-point range, and Stephen Curry scored 26 points on 5-of-9 shooting from downtown to go along with 13 rebounds. For the Cavaliers, James had 39 points, falling one assist shy of a triple-double with 11 rebounds and 9 assists. Kyrie Irving added 38 points but struggled from beyond the arc, going 0-for-7. Despite stellar performances from both James and Irving, Cleveland finished the game a dismal 12-of-44 from three-point range, compared to the Warriors 16-of-33 performance on three-pointers.

=== Game 4 ===
ABC

June 9
9:00 pm

Boxscore

Golden State Warriors 116, Cleveland Cavaliers 137
Scoring by quarter: 33–49, 35–37, 28–29, 20–22
Pts: Kevin Durant 35; Rebs: Draymond Green 14; Asts: Stephen Curry 10	Pts: Kyrie Irving 40; Rebs: James, Tristan Thompson 10 each Asts: LeBron James 11
Golden State leads series, 3–1

Quicken Loans Arena, Cleveland, Ohio
Attendance: 20,562
Referees:
- No. 24 Mike Callahan
- No. 8 Marc Davis
- No. 30 John Goble

The Cavaliers led wire-to-wire as they avoided a Finals sweep by Golden State to rout the Warriors 137–116, ending Golden State's NBA postseason record winning streak at 15 games to start the 2017 playoffs. The game was notable for shattering a number of NBA Finals records. Cleveland scored 49 points in the first quarter, the most points of any period in an NBA Finals game, en route to scoring 86 points for the first half, which was the most points scored in a half. They also hit 13 three-pointers in the first half, which broke the NBA Finals record for most threes in a half set last game by the Warriors. The Cavaliers finished the game with 24 three-pointers, which easily broke the Finals record for the most threes in a game set by the Warriors in Game 2. Both teams combined to score a total of 154 points in the first half, which is another Finals record for most points by any two teams in a half.

LeBron James tallied his ninth triple-double of the Finals (31 points, 10 rebounds, 11 assists), surpassing Magic Johnson for the most triple-doubles in a championship series. His highlight of the game came three minutes into the third quarter when he threw a pass off the backboard to himself, finishing with a powerful dunk. James also passed Michael Jordan for third all-time in points scored in the Finals. Kyrie Irving led all scorers with 40 points, breaking out of a shooting slump from behind the arc by going 7-for-12. Kevin Love added 23 points on 6-of-8 from downtown, and J. R. Smith had 15 points, all on 5-of-9 from three-point range, including a deep shot from 30 feet in the second quarter to beat the shot clock buzzer. Kevin Durant scored 35 points to lead the Warriors, but their other three superstars were held to under 20 points each as Stephen Curry, Klay Thompson, and Draymond Green managed 14, 13, and 16 points respectively. Cleveland trailed the Finals 3–1 as the series shifted back to Oakland.

Game 4 was also notable for a number of testy incidents. As the teams prepared for a jump ball with 1:56 left in the first quarter, Green was called for a hard foul for throwing an elbow at Iman Shumpert. Green was trying to plead his case when Warriors head coach Steve Kerr simultaneously argued with the officials, who then called a technical foul on Kerr, although it was mistakenly recorded as a foul on Green. With 7:26 remaining in the third quarter, Love fouled Durant from behind on a layup attempt. Durant claimed he was hit hard in the forehead, and James exchanged words with him, leading to a double-technical on the pair as well as a Type 1 flagrant foul on Kevin Love. About a minute later, Green picked up what appeared to be his second technical foul of the game, which would have forced an ejection. However, the officials confirmed that the first technical was on coach Kerr, not Green as originally recorded. Late in the third, Shumpert and Zaza Pachulia got involved in a mini scuffle when battling for the loose ball, with Pachulia hitting in the direction of Shumpert's groin and Shumpert retaliating. At the same time, a Cavaliers fan charged onto the court to shout at Matt Barnes during the Warriors huddle as the officials were replaying the incident. Shumpert and Pachulia were assessed double technicals, and the fan was escorted out of the arena by security personnel.

Many in the media and on Twitter commented on the refereeing in this game, calling it "a disaster" and "a sideshow".

=== Game 5 ===
ABC

June 12
9:00 pm (6:00 pm PDT)

Boxscore

Cleveland Cavaliers 120, Golden State Warriors 129
Scoring by quarter: 37–33, 23–38, 33–27, 27–31
Pts: LeBron James 41; Rebs: LeBron James 13; Asts: LeBron James 8	Pts: Kevin Durant 39; Rebs: Draymond Green 12; Asts: Stephen Curry 10
Golden State wins NBA Finals, 4–1

Oracle Arena, Oakland, California
Attendance: 19,596
Referees:
- No. 43 Dan Crawford
- No. 14 Ed Malloy
- No. 9 Derrick Stafford

External videos
- Full game broadcast by ABC on YouTube

The Warriors defeated the Cavaliers by a score of 129–120 to win the series 4–1. With this win, Golden State's 16–1 postseason record is the best winning percentage (.941) in NBA playoffs history. LeBron James and Kyrie Irving tried their best to combat the Warriors offense but were unable to overcome a bad night from Kevin Love, who only had six points and a game low minus-21 in his 29 minutes, and the Cavaliers bench, which was outscored seven to 35 by the Warriors' bench. The Cavaliers did come out aggressive early while Golden State dealt with a series of turnovers. Although the Warriors trailed 41–33 with 10:14 left in the second quarter, they chipped away at that deficit and eventually were able to take a 45–43 lead. David West got tangled up with Irving while fighting for the ball with 3:08 left before halftime; after J.R. Smith pushed West from behind, Tristan Thompson entered the tussle and went face-to-face with West while each jawed at one another. West, Thompson and Smith all received technical fouls after the officials reviewed the replay. A 28–4 run pushed Golden State ahead, just after it looked like Durant committed his third foul on a basket by James that was not called. The Cavaliers were barely able to hold on, trailing by 11 at the end of the half. Cleveland responded in the third quarter by outscoring the Warriors 33–27 to cut the lead to five and eventually to as little as three, but could not withstand the offensive barrage by the Warriors in the fourth quarter. Kevin Durant hit a 17-foot fadeaway over James early in the fourth quarter, then assisted on an Andre Iguodala three-pointer the next possession as the Warriors began to pull away for good. In the fourth quarter, Stephen Curry hit a three-pointer over Kyrie Irving to seal the game for the Warriors.

Kevin Durant, who was defeated in the 2012 NBA Finals when his Oklahoma City Thunder were finished off 4–1 by LeBron James' Miami Heat, returned the favor by scoring a team high 39 points in the 4–1 series defeat of James' Cavaliers while being honored as the 2017 Finals MVP. Stephen Curry added 34 points, 10 assists and six rebounds alongside Draymond Green's 12 big rebounds. Andre Iguodala, the 2015 Finals MVP, showed up big off the bench with 20 points. LeBron James finished with 41 points, 13 rebounds, and eight assists and became the first player in NBA history to average a triple-double in the NBA Finals, a feat made all the more impressive with his excellent shooting percentages of 56% from the field and 38% from behind the arc over the five-game series, with the only blemishes being his poor free-throw shooting and turnover count. Kyrie Irving was Cleveland's second leading scorer with 26 points on 9-of-22 from the field. However, it was the final game of Irving's career with the Cavaliers before being traded to the Boston Celtics in the off-season. J. R. Smith scored his 2017 postseason-best 25 points while going 7-of-8 from beyond the arc.

With the win at Oracle, the Warriors became the first Bay Area team to win a championship in their home city since the Oakland A's beat the Los Angeles Dodgers in Game 5 of the 1974 World Series (the San Francisco 49ers won Super Bowl XIX in January 1985 at Stanford Stadium in nearby Stanford and the Oakland Athletics won the 1989 World Series in San Francisco), gaining revenge from their 2016 loss.

== Rosters ==
=== Golden State Warriors ===
2016–17 Golden State Warriors roster
Players

Pos.	No.	Player	Height	Weight	DOB	From
F	22	Matt Barnes	6 ft 7 in (2.01 m)	226 lb (103 kg)	1980-03-09	UCLA
G	21	Ian Clark	6 ft 3 in (1.91 m)	175 lb (79 kg)	1991-03-07	Belmont
G	30	Stephen Curry	6 ft 3 in (1.91 m)	190 lb (86 kg)	1988-03-14	Davidson
F	35	Kevin Durant	6 ft 9 in (2.06 m)	240 lb (109 kg)	1988-09-29	Texas
F	23	Draymond Green	6 ft 7 in (2.01 m)	230 lb (104 kg)	1990-03-04	Michigan State
G/F	9	Andre Iguodala	6 ft 6 in (1.98 m)	215 lb (98 kg)	1984-01-28	Arizona
C	15	Damian Jones	7 ft 0 in (2.13 m)	245 lb (111 kg)	1995-06-30	Vanderbilt
G	34	Shaun Livingston	6 ft 7 in (2.01 m)	192 lb (87 kg)	1985-09-11	Peoria Central HS (IL)
F	5	Kevon Looney ( (injured) )	6 ft 9 in (2.06 m)	220 lb (100 kg)	1996-02-06	UCLA
F	20	James Michael McAdoo	6 ft 9 in (2.06 m)	240 lb (109 kg)	1993-01-04	North Carolina
G	0	Patrick McCaw	6 ft 7 in (2.01 m)	185 lb (84 kg)	1995-10-25	UNLV
C	1	JaVale McGee	7 ft 0 in (2.13 m)	270 lb (122 kg)	1988-01-19	Nevada
C	27	Zaza Pachulia	6 ft 11 in (2.11 m)	275 lb (125 kg)	1984-02-10	Georgia
G	11	Klay Thompson	6 ft 7 in (2.01 m)	215 lb (98 kg)	1990-02-08	Washington State
F	3	David West	6 ft 9 in (2.06 m)	250 lb (113 kg)	1980-08-29	Xavier

Coaches
Head coach
- Steve Kerr
Assistant(s)
- Ron Adams
- Jarron Collins
- Mike Brown (associate HC)
- Chris DeMarco (player development)
- Bruce Fraser (player development)
- Willie Green (player development)

Legend
- (DP) Unsigned draft pick
- (FA) Free agent
- (S) Suspended
- (DL) On assignment to D-League affiliate
- Injured

Roster
Updated: May 31, 2017

=== Cleveland Cavaliers ===
2016–17 Cleveland Cavaliers roster
Players

Pos.	No.	Player	Height	Weight	DOB	From
G	20	Kay Felder	5 ft 9 in (1.75 m)	176 lb (80 kg)	1995–03–29	Oakland
F/C	8	Channing Frye	6 ft 11 in (2.11 m)	255 lb (116 kg)	1983–05–17	Arizona
G	2	Kyrie Irving	6 ft 3 in (1.91 m)	193 lb (88 kg)	1992–03–23	Duke
F	23	LeBron James	6 ft 8 in (2.03 m)	250 lb (113 kg)	1984–12–30	St. Vincent-St. Mary HS (OH)
F	24	Richard Jefferson	6 ft 7 in (2.01 m)	233 lb (106 kg)	1980–06–21	Arizona
F	30	Dahntay Jones	6 ft 6 in (1.98 m)	225 lb (102 kg)	1980–12–27	Duke
F	1	James Jones	6 ft 8 in (2.03 m)	218 lb (99 kg)	1980–10–04	Miami (FL)
G	26	Kyle Korver	6 ft 7 in (2.01 m)	212 lb (96 kg)	1981–03–17	Creighton
F	0	Kevin Love	6 ft 10 in (2.08 m)	251 lb (114 kg)	1988–09–07	UCLA
G	4	Iman Shumpert	6 ft 5 in (1.96 m)	220 lb (100 kg)	1990–06–26	Georgia Tech
G	5	J. R. Smith	6 ft 6 in (1.98 m)	225 lb (102 kg)	1985–09–09	Saint Benedict's Preparatory (NJ)
C	40	Walter Tavares	7 ft 3 in (2.21 m)	265 lb (120 kg)	1992–03–22	Cape Verde
C	13	Tristan Thompson	6 ft 10 in (2.08 m)	240 lb (109 kg)	1991–03–13	Texas
G	31	Deron Williams	6 ft 3 in (1.91 m)	200 lb (91 kg)	1984–06–26	Illinois
F	3	Derrick Williams	6 ft 8 in (2.03 m)	240 lb (109 kg)	1991–05–25	Arizona

Coaches
Head coach
- Tyronn Lue
Assistant(s)
- Jim Boylan
- Larry Drew
- Damon Jones
- Mike Longabardi
- James Posey
- Phil Handy
- Vitaly Potapenko

Legend
- (DP) Unsigned draft pick
- (FA) Free agent
- (S) Suspended
- (DL) On assignment to D-League affiliate
- Injured

Roster
Updated: May 8, 2017

== Player statistics ==
Legend
GP	Games played	GS	Games started	MPG	Minutes per game
FG%	Field-goal percentage	3P%	3-point field-goal percentage	FT%	Free-throw percentage
RPG	Rebounds per game	APG	Assists per game	SPG	Steals per game
BPG	Blocks per game	PPG	Points per game

Golden State Warriors

Golden State Warriors statistics
Player	GP	GS	MPG	FG%	3P%	FT%	RPG	APG	SPG	BPG	PPG
Ian Clark	4	0	11.1	.438	.273	1.000	1.0	0.8	0.3	0.0	4.8
Stephen Curry	5	5	37.7	.440	.388	.897	8.0	9.4	2.2	0.0	26.8
Kevin Durant	5	5	39.7	.556	.474	.927	8.4	5.4	1.0	1.6	35.2
Draymond Green	5	5	35.4	.345	.280	.667	10.2	4.8	1.6	0.6	11.0
Andre Iguodala	5	0	28.2	.529	.333	.333	3.2	3.4	1.2	1.0	8.6
Shaun Livingston	5	0	15.0	.536	.000	1.000	1.0	1.2	0.2	0.0	6.6
James Michael McAdoo	4	0	2.8	.667	.000	.000	0.5	0.0	0.3	0.0	1.0
Patrick McCaw	5	0	6.8	.273	.200	1.000	2.0	0.4	0.2	0.0	2.2
JaVale McGee	4	0	5.6	.667	.000	.750	2.5	0.8	0.0	0.5	2.8
Zaza Pachulia	5	5	13.2	.538	.000	.400	2.8	0.4	0.4	0.0	3.2
Klay Thompson	5	5	36.5	.429	.425	.714	4.8	2.2	0.4	0.2	16.4
David West	5	0	10.0	.588	.000	.500	2.0	0.6	0.0	0.6	4.2
Matt Barnes	5	0	1.8	.333	.500	.000	0.2	0.4	0.0	0.0	0.6

Cleveland Cavaliers

Cleveland Cavaliers statistics
Player	GP	GS	MPG	FG%	3P%	FT%	RPG	APG	SPG	BPG	PPG
Channing Frye	1	0	11.2	.200	.000	.000	3.0	1.0	0.0	0.0	2.0
Kyrie Irving	5	5	40.3	.472	.419	.900	4.0	4.4	1.0	0.2	29.4
LeBron James	5	5	42.4	.564	.387	.649	12.0	10.0	1.4	1.0	33.6
Richard Jefferson	5	0	16.6	.444	.111	.667	2.4	0.4	0.2	0.2	5.8
Dahntay Jones	3	0	3.5	.667	.500	1.000	1.3	0.0	0.0	0.0	3.0
James Jones	3	0	2.8	.000	.000	.000	0.3	0.0	0.0	0.0	0.0
Kyle Korver	5	0	19.3	.368	.313	1.000	1.2	0.4	0.2	0.2	4.4
Kevin Love	5	5	32.2	.388	.387	.800	11.2	1.0	2.2	1.0	16.0
Iman Shumpert	5	0	13.3	.235	.222	.800	1.6	0.4	0.6	0.4	3.6
J. R. Smith	5	5	29.2	.541	.581	.333	1.3	0.3	0.8	0.0	11.8
Tristan Thompson	5	5	26.4	.545	.000	.667	5.8	2.6	0.6	0.6	5.6
Deron Williams	5	0	12.2	.125	.111	.000	1.6	1.2	0.4	0.0	1.0
Derrick Williams	3	0	3.4	.333	.500	1.000	0.3	0.3	0.0	0.0	2.3

== Media coverage ==
In the United States, the NBA Finals aired on ABC (and for the third consecutive year on local affiliates WEWS-TV in Cleveland and KGO-TV in San Francisco/Oakland) with Mike Breen as play-by-play commentator, and Mark Jackson and Jeff Van Gundy serving as color commentators. ESPN Radio aired it as well and had Marc Kestecher and Hubie Brown as commentators. ESPN Deportes provided exclusive Spanish-language coverage of The Finals, with a commentary team of Álvaro Martín and Carlos Morales.

Television viewership figures
Game	Ratings (households)	American audience (in millions)
1	10.5	18.7
2	10.7	19.7
3	11.3	20.0
4	10.7	19.0
5	13.5	24.5
Avg	11.3	20.4

== Aftermath ==
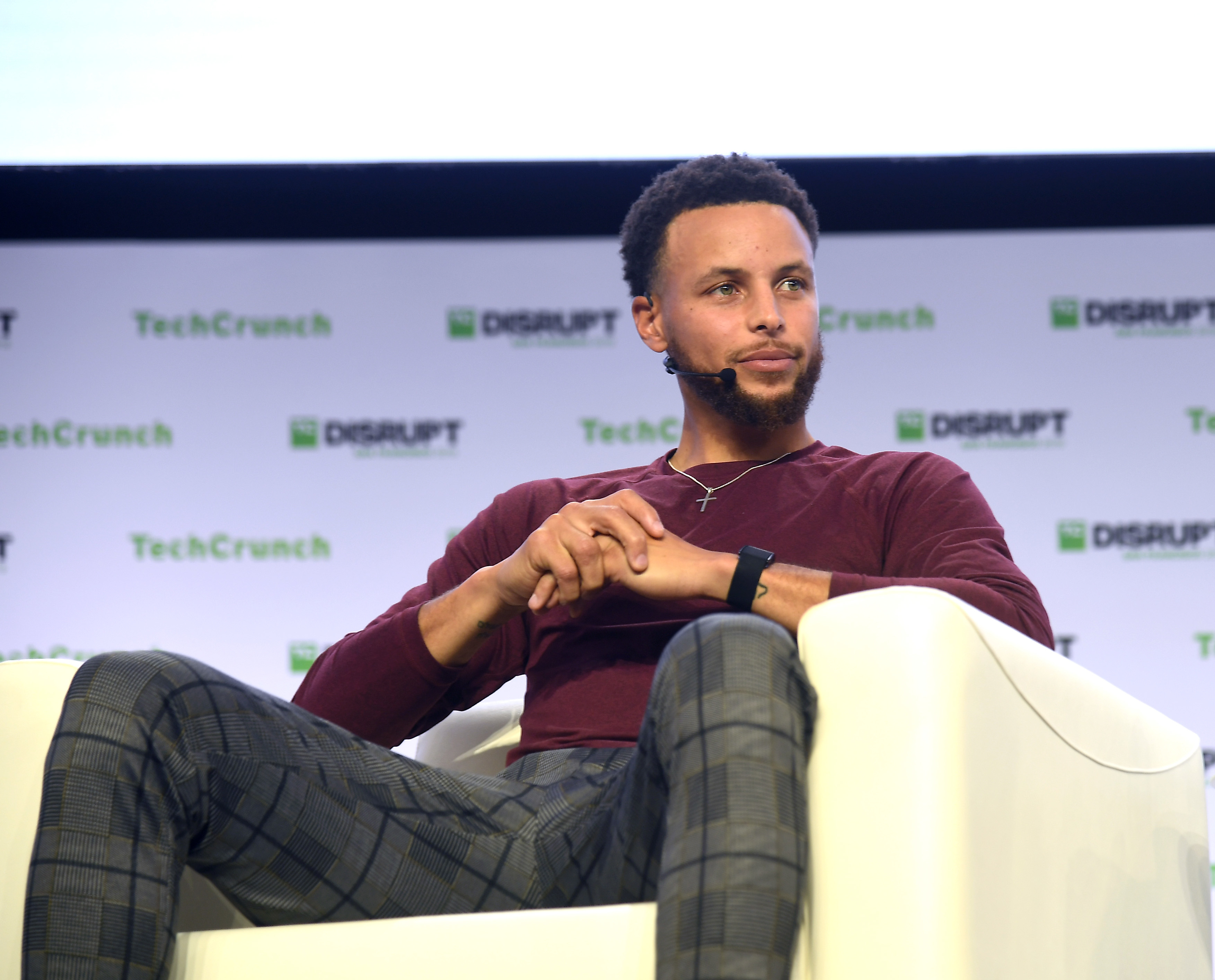
Stephen Curry and Donald Trump were in the middle of a culture war throughout 2017.

The Cavaliers and Warriors would play each other for a record fourth straight NBA Finals in 2018. Despite just the one year in between the 2017 and 2018 Finals, the composition of the Cavaliers' roster was extremely different. Gone was the second best player, Kyrie Irving, who traded to the Boston Celtics in the off-season, as he wanted to be more of the focal point of his own team instead of continuing to play alongside LeBron James. Going back to Cleveland in the trade was draft pick compensation, Ante Zizic, Jae Crowder, and Isaiah Thomas, the latter of which was the star return of the trade, but had a hip impingement that saw him miss most of the season. The Cavs had a major trade deadline shake-up where they traded six players (including James' close friend and Heat co-star Dwyane Wade, who signed in Cleveland during the off-season) for four players. Nevertheless, the Cavs were swept by the Warriors, in a series most remembered for J. R. Smith's Game 1 blunder.

=== The Warriors and President Trump White House controversy ===
Following their 2017 championship, star guard Stephen Curry stated he not want to visit the White House during the team's annual visit to the capital due to new President Donald Trump's conservative politics. This led to Trump tweeting that Curry and the Warriors were no longer invited to the White House because of what the president called hesitation to accept his invitation. Trump's comment on Curry came one day after the president told NFL owners to fire players who won't stand for the national anthem. NBA Commissioner Adam Silver weighed in with his disappointment that the league's champion would not be going to the White House. LeBron James also weighted in, calling Trump a "bum" and stating going to the White House was an honor before he became president. In lieu of a White House visit, the Warriors went to the National Museum of African-American History and Culture with local students during their annual trip to Washington D.C. Klay Thompson said of the trip, "We're not going to politicize anything. We're just going to go hang out with some kids and take them to the African-American Museum and teach them things we learned along the way, life lessons and hopefully give them some great memories."

The Warriors later visited the White House in 2023 to celebrate their 2022 championship during the Joe Biden administration. An NBA champion did not accept Trump's White House invitation until his second term as President (2025–2028), when the New York Knicks won in 2026. Trump, who was a fan of the team and attended many games at Madison Square Garden before becoming President, attended Game 3 of the Finals, becoming the first sitting President to attend in NBA Finals game.

== See also ==
- Death Lineup
- Cavaliers–Warriors rivalry
