= List of NBA teams by single season win percentage =

This is a list of the all-time best and worst regular season winning percentages in the NBA.

Statistics accurate as of the 2025–26 NBA season.

NBA Champions
Conference Champions
Active season

== Above .775 ==
Regular season						Diff^{[a]}	Team	Season	Postseason					Notes	Coach
PCT	W	L	H	R	N	Diff^{[a]}	Team	Season	Results	W	L	H	R	Notes	Coach
.890	73	9	39–2	34–7	0–0	10.8	Golden State Warriors	2015–16	Lost in NBA Finals	15	9	11–3	4–6	List: Most wins in NBA regular season history (73); Most wins in NBA history, regular season and postseason combined (88); Best start in NBA history (24–0); Best start in NBA history for every number of losses from 1–2 and 4–9: (29–1, .967), (36–2, .947), (48–4, .923), (55–5, .917), (62–6, .912), (68–7, .907), (69–8, .896), (73–9, .890); Started 36–0 at home, part of an NBA record 54-straight home wins dating back to 2014–15 season; Most road wins in NBA history (34); Best road start in NBA history (14–0); Best record heading into the All-Star Break in NBA history (48–4, 0.923); List: Undefeated November (16–0); Winning streaks of 24 and 11 games; First team in NBA history to make over 1,000 three-pointers in regular-season; Only team in NBA history not to have lost to same opponent twice in regular season; Only team in NBA history not to lose back-to-back games in regular season; Only team in NBA history to finish with same number of regular season and postseason losses (9); 10th team in NBA history to win a playoff series coming back from a 1–3 deficit (won 4–3 against the Oklahoma City Thunder in the Western Conference Finals); 11th team in NBA history to lose a playoff series after taking a 3–1 lead (lost 3–4 against the Cleveland Cavaliers in the NBA Finals) and the only team to do so in the NBA Finals.	Steve Kerr
.878	72	10	39–2	33–8	0–0	12.2	Chicago Bulls	1995–96	Won NBA Championship	15	3	10–0	5–3	List: Best combined regular and postseason record in NBA history (87–13, .870); Most wins by a championship-winning team; Best 3-loss start in NBA history (41–3, .932); Started 37–0 at home, part of 44-game home winning streak dating back to 1994–95 season; Winning streaks of 18 and 13 games; Undefeated January (14–0); One of five teams in NBA history to have three players selected to the NBA All-Defensive First Team; Final three losses were by a margin of one point each; Defeated 64–18 Seattle SuperSonics in NBA Finals	Phil Jackson
.841	69	13	36–5	31–7	2–1	12.3	Los Angeles Lakers	1971–72	Won NBA Championship	12	3	6–2	6–1	List: 33-game winning streak, longest in NBA history; 16-game road winning streak, longest in NBA history; Started 39–3; Undefeated November (14–0) and December (16–0)	Bill Sharman
.841	69	13	39–2	30–11	0–0	10.8	Chicago Bulls	1996–97	Won NBA Championship	15	4	10–1	5–3	List: Started 12–0 and 17–1; Lost three of final four games; Defeated 64–18 Utah Jazz in NBA Finals; First team to win 30 road games in back-to-back seasons	Phil Jackson
.840	68	13	28–2	26–8	14–3	9.4	Philadelphia 76ers	1966–67	Won NBA Championship	11	4	6–2	5–2	List: Started 26–2; Tied for best 50-game start in NBA history (46–4, .920)	Alex Hannum
.829	68	14	33–6	32–8	3–0	8.2	Boston Celtics	1972–73	Lost Eastern Conference Finals	7	6	4–3	3–3	List: Highest winning percentage for a team that did not reach the NBA Finals (.829)	Tom Heinsohn
.829	68	14	35–6	32–8	1–0	12.9	Oklahoma City Thunder	2024–25	Won NBA Championship	16	7	11–2	5–5	List: Best ever record against opposing conference (29–1 vs Eastern Conference); Largest difference between a 1 and 2 seed in the same conference in NBA regular-season history (16 games); Best point-differential in NBA regular-season history (+12.9); Most double digit wins in an NBA regular season (54 wins); Winning streaks of 15 and 11 games; Youngest team to win 60+ games in a season	Mark Daigneault
.817	67	15	40–1	27–14	0–0	9.4	Boston Celtics	1985–86	Won NBA Championship	15	3	10–0	5–3	List: Shares best home record in NBA history (with 2015–16 San Antonio Spurs); Winning streaks of 14 and 13 games	K. C. Jones
.817	67	15	36–5	31–10	0–0	10.4	Chicago Bulls	1991–92	Won NBA Championship	15	7	9–3	6–4	List: Winning streaks of 14 and 13 games	Phil Jackson
.817	67	15	36–5	31–10	0–0	8.5	Los Angeles Lakers	1999–00	Won NBA Championship	15	8	11–2	4–6	List: Winning streaks of 19, 16, and 11 games	Phil Jackson
.817	67	15	36–5	31–10	0–0	7.2	Dallas Mavericks	2006–07	Lost Western Conference 1st round	2	4	2–1	0–3	List: Started 0–4; One of two teams in NBA history with three winning streaks of at least 12 games (17, 13, and 12); Undefeated February (10–0); Only team over .800 to be eliminated in the first round; First 1st seed to lose to an 8th seed in a 7-game playoff format	Avery Johnson
.817	67	15	39–2	28–13	0–0	10.1	Golden State Warriors	2014–15	Won NBA Championship	16	5	9–2	7–3	List: Winning streaks of 16 and 11 games; Most wins by a rookie head coach; Undefeated in the regular season when allowing under 100 points	Steve Kerr
.817	67	15	40–1	27–14	0–0	10.6	San Antonio Spurs	2015–16	Lost Western Conference Semifinals	6	4	3–2	3–2	List: Shares best home record in NBA history (with 1985–86 Boston Celtics), with only loss inflicted by the 73–9 Warriors; Best home start in NBA history (39–0), part of a 48-game home winning streak dating back to 2014–15 season; Best season record that was not also league-best record	Gregg Popovich
.817	67	15	36–5	31–10	0–0	11.6	Golden State Warriors	2016–17	Won NBA Championship	16	1	9–0	7–1	List: Best playoff record in NBA history (16–1, .941); Longest winning streak in NBA playoff history (15 games); First team in NBA playoff history to start 15–0; First team in all four major professional sports leagues in North America to start 15–0 in the postseason; NBA record 146 regular-season games without back-to-back losses (dating back to 2014–15 NBA season); Winning streaks of 14 and 12 games; Second team to win 30 road games in back-to-back seasons (after 1995–96 and 1996–97 Chicago Bulls); Most wins in NBA history over the course of three regular seasons (207)	Steve Kerr
.817	49	11	29–1	20–10	0–0	9.9	Washington Capitols	1946–47	Lost semifinals	2	4	0–3	2–1	List: Winning streaks of 17 and 15 games; Undefeated December (10–0)	Red Auerbach
.805	66	16	34–2	28–13	4–1	12.3	Milwaukee Bucks	1970–71	Won NBA Championship	12	2	8–0	4–2	List: Started 17–1; Winning streaks of 20, 16 and 10 games; Lost five of final six games; Highest point-differential in NBA playoffs history (+14.5)	Larry Costello
.805	66	16	35–6	31–10	0–0	10.3	Boston Celtics	2007–08	Won NBA Championship	16	10	13–1	3–9	List: Best single-season improvement in NBA history (42 wins); Started 29–3; Played a record 26 games in the postseason	Doc Rivers
.805	66	16	39–2	27–14	0–0	8.9	Cleveland Cavaliers	2008–09	Lost Eastern Conference Finals	10	4	6–1	4–3	List: 13-game winning streak	Mike Brown
.805	66	16	37–4	29–12	0–0	7.9	Miami Heat	2012–13	Won NBA Championship	16	7	10–3	6–4	List: Started 29–14; 27-game winning streak; First team in NBA history to win 17 games in one month; Best second half of season in NBA history (38–3, .927)	Erik Spoelstra
.797	51	13	31–1	15–12	5–0	8.2	Syracuse Nationals	1949–50	Lost NBA Finals	6	5	5–1	1–4	List: Started 16–1; 12-game winning streak	Al Cervi
.793	65	17	35–6	30–11	0–0	7.7	Philadelphia 76ers	1982–83	Won NBA Championship	12	1	7–0	5–1	List: 14-game winning streak	Billy Cunningham
.793	65	17	37–4	28–13	0–0	9.3	Los Angeles Lakers	1986–87	Won NBA Championship	15	3	10–0	5–3		Pat Riley
.793	65	17	36–5	29–12	0–0	7.7	Los Angeles Lakers	2008–09	Won NBA Championship	16	7	10–2	6–5		Phil Jackson
.793	65	17	34–7	31–10	0–0	8.5	Houston Rockets	2017–18	Lost Western Conference Finals	11	6	7–3	4–3	List: Winning streaks of 17, 14, and 11 games; Most three-pointers made in a regular season; Most consecutive three-pointers missed in a playoff game	Mike D'Antoni
.787	59	16	25–2	23–9	11–5	8.3	Boston Celtics	1959–60	Won NBA Championship	8	5	5–2	3–3	List: 17-game winning streak; Undefeated December (15–0)	Red Auerbach
.780	64	18	38–3	26–15	0–0	7.8	Seattle SuperSonics	1995–96	Lost NBA Finals	13	8	8–3	5–5	List: 14-game winning streak; Lost to 72–10 Chicago Bulls in NBA Finals	George Karl
.780	64	18	38–3	26–15	0–0	8.8	Utah Jazz	1996–97	Lost NBA Finals	13	7	10–1	3–6	List: Two 15-game winning streaks; Four game losing streak; Lost to 69–13 Chicago Bulls in NBA Finals	Jerry Sloan
.780	64	18	37–4	27–14	0–0	6.6	Detroit Pistons	2005–06	Lost Eastern Conference Finals	10	8	8–2	2–6		Flip Saunders
.780	64	18	32–9	32–9	0–0	7.5	Phoenix Suns	2021–22	Lost Western Conference Semifinals	7	6	5–2	2–4	List: Winning streaks of 18 and 11 games; Undefeated November (16–0); Second team in league history to finish with 10+ more wins than the previous year for three consecutive years; 47–0 when leading after 3 quarters (NBA record for most wins without a loss in those situations)	Monty Williams
.780	64	18	37–4	27–14	0–0	11.3	Boston Celtics	2023–24	Won NBA Championship	16	3	9–2	7–1	List: 11-game winning streak; Started franchise record 20–0 at home; 10-game winning streak in the playoffs	Joe Mazzulla
.780	64	18	34–7	30–11	0–0	9.8	Cleveland Cavaliers	2024–25	Lost Eastern Conference Semifinals	5	4	2–3	3–1	List: Started 15–0; Winning streaks of 16, 15 and 12 games; One of two teams in NBA history with three winning streaks of at least 12 games	Kenny Atkinson
.780	64	18	34–7	30–10	0–1	11.1	Oklahoma City Thunder	2025–26	Lost Western Conference Finals	11	4	6–2	5–2	List: Winning streaks of 16 and 12 games	Mark Daigneault
.775	62	18	27–3	27–11	8–4	8.4	Boston Celtics	1964–65	Won NBA Championship	8	4	7–0	1–4	List: 16-game winning streak	Red Auerbach

=== Notes ===
- ^{a} Formula for average point differential: $\mbox{Average point differential}=\frac{\mbox{Total points for}-\mbox{Total points against}}{\mbox{Total games played}}$
- The Boston Celtics appear six times on the list, followed by the Los Angeles Lakers with four appearances, and the Chicago Bulls and Golden State Warriors with three each.
- Phil Jackson appears five times on the list, followed by Red Auerbach and Steve Kerr with three each.
- Phil Jackson (coaching the Los Angeles Lakers and the Chicago Bulls) and Red Auerbach (coaching the Boston Celtics and the Washington Capitols) are the only coaches to appear leading different teams.

== Below .175 ==
Regular season						Diff^{[a]}	Team	Season	Notes	Coach(es)
PCT	W	L	H	R	N	Diff^{[a]}	Team	Season	Notes	Coach(es)
.106	7	59	4–29	3–30	0–0	−13.9	Charlotte Bobcats	2011–12	23-game losing streak	Paul Silas
.110	9	73	5–26	2–36	2–11	−12.1	Philadelphia 76ers	1972–73	List: 20-game losing streak; Together with 1971–72 Philadelphia 76ers also had 19-game losing streak	Roy Rubin (4–47); Kevin Loughery (5–26)
.122	10	72	7–34	3–38	0–0	−10.2	Philadelphia 76ers	2015–16	List: Together with 2014–15 Philadelphia 76ers had 28-game losing streak, tied for NBA record	Brett Brown
.125	6	42	2–18	4–24	0–0	−11.6	Providence Steamrollers	1947–48	10-game losing streak	Albert Soar (2–17); Nat Hickey (4–25)
.134	11	71	7–34	4–37	0–0	−15.2	Dallas Mavericks	1992–93	List: 15-game losing streak; Together with 1993–94 Dallas Mavericks had a combined record of 24–140, worst over two season span	Richie Adubato (2–27); Gar Heard (9–44)
.134	11	71	9–32	2–39	0–0	−11.8	Denver Nuggets	1997–98	23-game losing streak	Bill Hanzlik
.146	12	70	9–32	3–38	0–0	−11.4	Los Angeles Clippers	1986–87	16, 14, and 12-game losing streaks	Don Chaney
.146	12	70	8–33	4–37	0–0	−9.1	New Jersey Nets	2009–10	List: 18-game losing streak; Together with 2008–09 New Jersey Nets had 19-game losing streak	Lawrence Frank (0–16); Tom Barrise (0–2); Kiki Vandeweghe (12–52)
.159	13	69	6–35	7–34	0–0	−8.7	Dallas Mavericks	1993–94	20-game losing streak	Quinn Buckner
.159	13	69	9–32	4–37	0–0	−9.7	Atlanta Hawks	2004–05	14 and 13-game losing streaks	Mike Woodson
.160	8	42	7–18	1–24	0–0	−8.7	Vancouver Grizzlies	1998–99	13-game losing streak	Brian Hill
.171	14	68	9–32	5–36	0–0	−11.6	Houston Rockets	1982–83	10-game losing streak	Del Harris
.171	14	68	7–33	7–35	0–0	−9.1	Detroit Pistons	2023–24	Tied NBA record 28-game losing streak	Monty Williams

== See also ==
- NBA records
- List of NBA longest winning streaks
- List of NBA longest losing streaks
