= List of NBA longest winning streaks =

The longest winning streaks in National Basketball Association (NBA) history are presented on two lists. One list counts only regular-season games, including streaks that started in one season and carried over into the following season. The other list is made up of playoff games only.

The Los Angeles Lakers own the longest winning streak in NBA history. They won 33 straight games in the 1971–72 NBA season, compiling a season-best 69–13 record and went on to win the NBA Finals. In the 2016–17 NBA season, the Golden State Warriors posted a season-best 67–15 regular-season record and began the 2017 playoffs with a 15-game win-streak, the most consecutive wins in NBA playoff history. They went on to win the NBA Championship with a 16–1 (.941 winning percentage) record, the best playoff record in NBA history.

The Los Angeles Lakers appear six times across both lists, with four streaks over 15 games in the regular season and two over ten games in the postseason. The Boston Celtics also appear six times, with five streaks in the regular season and one in the postseason. The Milwaukee Bucks appear five times, with all five streaks in the regular season. The San Antonio Spurs appear four times, with 2 streaks in the regular season and 2 in the postseason.

== Key ==
^	Denotes streaks that spanned two seasons
+	Denotes streaks that are currently in progress
*	Denotes season in which team won championship

== Streaks ==
=== Regular season ===
This list contains only the top 25 streaks consisting entirely of regular season games. Streaks that spanned consecutive seasons are included as well.

Rank	Games	Team	Season(s)	Season record(s)	Date	Score	Opponent	Date	Score	Opponent
Rank	Games	Team	Season(s)	Season record(s)	Beginning (first victory)			End (first defeat)		
1	33	Los Angeles Lakers	1971–72*	69–13	November 5, 1971	110–106	Baltimore Bullets	January 9, 1972	104–120	Milwaukee Bucks
2	28 (4 + 24)	Golden State Warriors^	2014–15*; 2015–16	67–15; 73–9	April 9, 2015	116–105	Portland Trail Blazers	December 12, 2015	95–108	Milwaukee Bucks
3	27	Miami Heat	2012–13*	66–16	February 3, 2013	100–85	Toronto Raptors	March 27, 2013	97–101	Chicago Bulls
4	22	Houston Rockets	2007–08	55–27	January 29, 2008	111–107	Golden State Warriors	March 18, 2008	74–94	Boston Celtics
5 (tie)	20 (5 + 15)	Washington Capitols^	1947–48; 1948–49	28–20; 38–22	March 13, 1948	86–69	St. Louis Bombers	December 7, 1948	78–94	Indianapolis Jets
5 (tie)	20	Milwaukee Bucks	1970–71*	66–16	February 6, 1971	111–85	San Francisco Warriors	March 9, 1971	103–110	Chicago Bulls
7 (tie)	19	Los Angeles Lakers	1999–00*	67–15	February 4, 2000	113–67	Utah Jazz	March 16, 2000	102–109	Washington Wizards
7 (tie)	19	Boston Celtics	2008–09	62–20	November 15, 2008	102–97	Milwaukee Bucks	December 25, 2008	83–92	Los Angeles Lakers
7 (tie)	19	San Antonio Spurs	2013–14*	62–20	February 26, 2014	120–110	Detroit Pistons	April 3, 2014	94–106	Oklahoma City Thunder
7 (tie)	19	Atlanta Hawks	2014–15	60–22	December 27, 2014	90–85	Milwaukee Bucks	February 2, 2015	100–115	New Orleans Pelicans
11 (tie)	18 (15 + 3)	Rochester Royals^	1949–50; 1950–51*	51–17; 41–27	February 17, 1950	81–73	Boston Celtics	November 12, 1950	79–82	Tri-Cities Blackhawks
11 (tie)	18 (11 + 7)	Philadelphia 76ers^	1965–66; 1966–67*	55–25; 68–13	March 3, 1966	135–125	San Francisco Warriors	November 5, 1966	87–105	Boston Celtics
11 (tie)	18	New York Knicks	1969–70*	60–22	October 24, 1969	116–92	Detroit Pistons	November 29, 1969	98–110	Detroit Pistons
11 (tie)	18	Boston Celtics	1981–82	63–19	February 24, 1982	132–90	Utah Jazz	March 28, 1982	98–116	Philadelphia 76ers
11 (tie)	18	Chicago Bulls	1995–96*	72–10	December 29, 1995	120–93	Indiana Pacers	February 4, 1996	99–105	Denver Nuggets
11 (tie)	18	Milwaukee Bucks	2019–20	56–17	November 10, 2019	121–119	Oklahoma City Thunder	December 16, 2019	116–120	Dallas Mavericks
11 (tie)	18	Phoenix Suns	2021–22	64–18	October 30, 2021	101–92	Cleveland Cavaliers	December 3, 2021	96–118	Golden State Warriors
18 (tie)	17	Washington Capitols	1946–47	49–11	November 16, 1946	73–65	Chicago Stags	January 1, 1947	57–62	Detroit Falcons
18 (tie)	17	Boston Celtics	1959–60*	59–16	November 28, 1959	136–110	Detroit Pistons	January 1, 1960	115–128	Cincinnati Royals
18 (tie)	17	San Antonio Spurs	1995–96	59–23	February 29, 1996	120–95	Toronto Raptors	April 2, 1996	94–101	Phoenix Suns
18 (tie)	17	Phoenix Suns	2006–07	61–21	December 29, 2006	108–86	New York Knicks	January 29, 2007	112–121	Minnesota Timberwolves
18 (tie)	17	Dallas Mavericks	2006–07	67–15	January 27, 2007	106–104	Sacramento Kings	March 12, 2007	100–117	Golden State Warriors
18 (tie)	17	Los Angeles Clippers	2012–13	56–26	November 28, 2012	101–95	Minnesota Timberwolves	January 1, 2013	78–92	Denver Nuggets
18 (tie)	17	Houston Rockets	2017–18	65–17	January 30, 2018	113–102	Phoenix Suns	March 9, 2018	105–108	Toronto Raptors
25 (tie)	16	Boston Celtics	1964–65*	62–18	December 19, 1964	115–105	St. Louis Hawks	January 23, 1965	100–104	Philadelphia 76ers
25 (tie)	16	Milwaukee Bucks	1970–71*	66–16	October 24, 1970	122–120	Baltimore Bullets	November 27, 1970	94–103	New York Knicks
25 (tie)	16 (14 + 2)	Milwaukee Bucks^	1972–73; 1973–74	60–22; 59–23	February 28, 1973	124–110	Seattle SuperSonics	October 14, 1973	100–109	Seattle SuperSonics
25 (tie)	16	Los Angeles Lakers	1990–91	58–24	January 9, 1991	108–85	Utah Jazz	February 9, 1991	95–99	Phoenix Suns
25 (tie)	16	Portland Trail Blazers	1990–91	63–19	March 20, 1991	100–96	Los Angeles Clippers	April 21, 1991	118–135	Phoenix Suns
25 (tie)	16	Los Angeles Lakers	1999–00*	67–15	December 11, 1999	106–94	Vancouver Grizzlies	January 14, 2000	102–111	Indiana Pacers
25 (tie)	16	Golden State Warriors	2014–15*	67–15	November 13, 2014	107–99	Brooklyn Nets	December 16, 2014	98–105	Memphis Grizzlies
25 (tie)	16	Boston Celtics	2017–18	55–27	October 20, 2017	102–92	Philadelphia 76ers	November 22, 2017	98–104	Miami Heat
25 (tie)	16	Philadelphia 76ers	2017–18	52–30	March 15, 2018	118–110	New York Knicks	October 16, 2018	87–105	Boston Celtics
25 (tie)	16	Milwaukee Bucks	2022–23	58–24	January 23, 2023	150–130	Detroit Pistons	March 4, 2023	130–133	Philadelphia 76ers
25 (tie)	16	Cleveland Cavaliers	2024–25	64–18	February 5, 2025	118–115	Detroit Pistons	March 16, 2025	103–108	Orlando Magic
25 (tie)	16	Oklahoma City Thunder	2025–26	64–18	November 7, 2025	132–101	Sacramento Kings	December 13, 2025	109–111	San Antonio Spurs

=== Playoffs ===
This list contains only the top 10 streaks consisting entirely of postseason games. Streaks that spanned consecutive postseasons are included as well.

Rank	Games	Team	Season(s)	Date	Score	Opponent	Date	Score	Opponent
Rank	Games	Team	Season(s)	Beginning (first victory)			End (first defeat)		
1	15	Golden State Warriors	2016–17*	April 16, 2017	121–109	Portland Trail Blazers	June 9, 2017	116–137	Cleveland Cavaliers
2 (tie)	13 (2 + 11)	Los Angeles Lakers^	1987–88*; 1988–89	June 19, 1988	103–102	Detroit Pistons	June 6, 1989	97–109	Detroit Pistons
2 (tie)	13 (3 + 10)	Cleveland Cavaliers^	2015–16*; 2016–17	June 13, 2016	112–97	Golden State Warriors	May 21, 2017	108–111	Boston Celtics
2 (tie)	13	New York Knicks	2025–26*	April 25, 2026	114–98	Atlanta Hawks	June 8, 2026	111–115	San Antonio Spurs
5 (tie)	12 (7 + 5)	Detroit Pistons^	1988–89*; 1989–90*	May 29, 1989	86–80	Chicago Bulls	May 12, 1990	103–111	New York Knicks
5 (tie)	12	San Antonio Spurs	1998–99*	May 13, 1999	85–71	Minnesota Timberwolves	June 21, 1999	81–89	New York Knicks
5 (tie)	12 (1 + 11)	Los Angeles Lakers^	1999–00*; 2000–01*	June 19, 2000	116–111	Indiana Pacers	June 6, 2001	101–107	Philadelphia 76ers
8 (tie)	10	New Jersey Nets	2002–03	April 29, 2003	89–82	Milwaukee Bucks	June 4, 2003	89–101	San Antonio Spurs
8 (tie)	10	San Antonio Spurs	2011–12	April 29, 2012	106–91	Utah Jazz	May 31, 2012	82–102	Oklahoma City Thunder
8 (tie)	10	Cleveland Cavaliers	2015–16*	April 17, 2016	106–101	Detroit Pistons	May 21, 2016	84–99	Toronto Raptors
8 (tie)	10	Boston Celtics	2023–24*	May 11, 2024	106–93	Cleveland Cavaliers	June 14, 2024	84–122	Dallas Mavericks

== See also ==
- List of NBA longest losing streaks
- List of NBA teams by single season win percentage
- NBA records
