= 2015–16 Golden State Warriors season =

NBA professional basketball team season

- Conference champions
- Division champions
- Head coach: Steve Kerr; Luke Walton (Note: Luke Walton served as interim head coach from October 27, 2015 to January 20, 2016 while Steve Kerr recovered from back surgery complications. He led Golden State to a 39–4 start.) (interim)
- General manager: Bob Myers
- Owners: Peter Guber
- Arena: Oracle Arena

Results
- Record: 73–9 (.890)
- Place: Division: 1st (Pacific); Conference: 1st (Western)
- Playoff finish: NBA Finals (lost to Cavaliers 3–4)
- Stats at Basketball Reference

Local media
- Television: Comcast SportsNet Bay Area
- Radio: KNBR

The 2015–16 Golden State Warriors season was the 70th season of the franchise in the National Basketball Association (NBA), and its 54th in the San Francisco Bay Area. The Warriors entered the season as the defending NBA champions and set the best ever regular-season record of 73–9, breaking the 1995–96 Chicago Bulls record of 72–10. Golden State broke their franchise record of 28 road wins in a season which they set in 2014–15; they ended the season with 34, passing the same 1995–96 Bulls team led by Michael Jordan and Scottie Pippen for the most road wins in NBA history. Warriors' head coach, Steve Kerr, has a significant connection to that Bulls team, as he previously served as a point guard during that specific season. Throughout the 2015-16 NBA season, Golden State broke over twenty-five NBA records and more than ten franchise records, including most wins ever recorded in an NBA season (regular-season and postseason combined); with 88. However, they lost in the NBA Finals to the LeBron James-led Cleveland Cavaliers in seven games, despite initially leading the series with a 3–1 advantage.

The Warriors began the 2015–16 season by winning their first 24 games, eclipsing the previous best start in NBA history, set by the 1993–94 Houston Rockets. Their record-setting start ended when they were defeated by the Milwaukee Bucks on December 12, 2015. The Warriors broke a 131-year-old record of 20–0 set by the 1884 St. Louis Maroons baseball team, to claim the best start to a season in all of the major professional sports in America. They also won 28 consecutive regular-season games dating back to the 2014–15 season, eclipsing the 2012–13 Miami Heat for the second longest winning streak in NBA history. The Warriors also set an NBA record 54-straight regular-season home-game winning streak, which spanned from January 31, 2015, to March 29, 2016. The previous record of 44 was held by the 1995–96 Chicago Bulls. The Warriors also became the first team in NBA history to go the entire regular season without back-to-back losses and without losing to the same team twice.

Steve Kerr was named Coach of the Year, the third coach in Warriors history to win the award. Stephen Curry was named Most Valuable Player for a second successive season and was the first unanimous winner in NBA history. Curry, Draymond Green and Klay Thompson were all named to the All-Star Game, the first time the Warriors have had three All-Stars since 1976. Along with the All-Star selection, Klay Thompson was also named to the All-NBA Third Team. Draymond Green was named to the All-NBA Second Team while also being selected as an All-Star. Green was named to the All-Defensive First Team and he finished in second place in DPOY voting with 44 first-place votes. Andre Iguodala finished in second place in Sixth Man of the Year voting with 33 first-place votes. Curry broke his own NBA record for made three-pointers in a season of 286, finishing with 402. Curry won the scoring title, averaging 30.1 points per game and led the league in steals and had the best free throw percentage. He became the seventh player to enter the 50–40–90 club (he shot 50% for field goals, 45% for three-pointers and 91% for free throws during the entire regular season).

== Season synopsis ==
=== Preseason ===
The 2015 NBA draft took place on June 25 at Barclays Center in Brooklyn, New York. Golden State chose power forward Kevon Looney with the 30th pick of the first round. On July 27, the Warriors traded David Lee to the Boston Celtics for Gerald Wallace and Chris Babb. Four days later, Wallace was traded to the Philadelphia 76ers for Jason Thompson.

=== Regular season ===
==== October/November ====
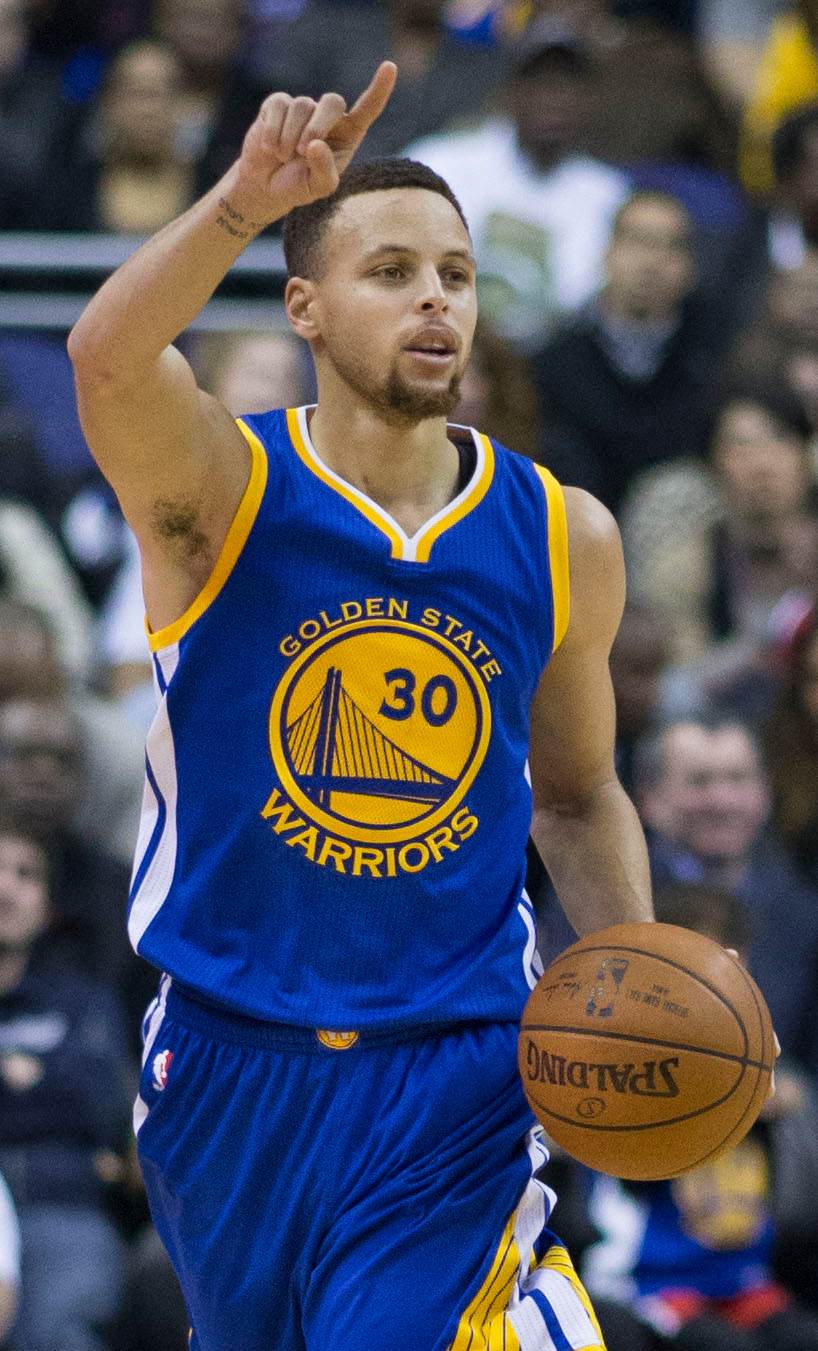
Stephen Curry made 402 three-pointers this season, breaking his own NBA record of 286.

The Warriors opened the regular season on October 27 with assistant coach Luke Walton coaching for the team after it was confirmed that coach Steve Kerr's back would not heal in time for the beginning of the regular season. That was Luke Walton's most successful season coaching in his career. Before the opener, the Golden State Warriors revealed their first title banner in 40 years and received their championship rings during a ceremony acknowledging the 2014–15 champions. Every player on the roster, with the exception of traded player David Lee, was in attendance with also the full coaching staff to celebrate the winningest season for the franchise. Golden State opened the season with a 111–95 win over the visiting New Orleans Pelicans. In that game, Stephen Curry led the Warriors with 40 points. On their third game of the season, they were once again up against the Pelicans, this time, they were on the road. On their first meeting, Curry scored 40 points, this time, Curry scored a season-high 53 points to lead the Warriors towards their third straight win. The Warriors opened their season with four wins and a combined margin-of-victory of 100 points, surpassing the 1961–62 Boston Celtics (99 points) for the largest win-margin over the first four games. On November 4, the Warriors won their fifth straight win after handing their division rival, the LA Clippers, their first loss of the season. Curry led the Warriors with 31 points. Eight days later, the Warriors won their tenth straight game after beating the Timberwolves, recording their first ever 10–0 start in a season in franchise history. On November 17, the Warriors have won their 12th straight game to start a season with 115–110 win over the visiting Toronto Raptors. They became the first defending champions to have won their first 12 games of a season since the 1996-97 Chicago Bulls. Three days later, the Warriors opened up the season with a 14–0 record after beating the visiting Chicago Bulls, 106–94. They also became the first defending champions to start their season with a 14–0 record since the 1957-58 Boston Celtics. On November 24, the Warriors won at home, 111–77, against the visiting Lakers and became the first team in NBA History to start a season with a 16–0 record, besting the 15–0 record set by the 1947-48 Capitols and 1993-94 Rockets. On November 27, the Warriors set new franchise records for longest winning streak (17) and three-point field goals made (22) in a 135–116 victory over the Phoenix Suns. They also extended their streak of scoring at least 100 points in a game for 17 straight games, the first team to do since the 2009-10 Suns.

==== December ====
On December 5, the Warriors beat the Toronto Raptors 112–109 to improve to 21–0 and set a new record for the best start to a season in all major professional sports in America, eclipsing the 20–0 mark set by the 1884 St. Louis Maroons baseball team of the Union Association. Also, with this 11th straight road victory, the Warriors set a new franchise-record for the longest road winning streak in their history. Golden State's 131–123 win on December 8 over the Pacers in Indianapolis improved their road record to 13–0, the best such start to a season in NBA history. The win improved their overall record to 23–0. On December 11, Golden State defeated the Boston Celtics 124–119 (2OT) to improve to 24–0 and move into second place on the NBA's longest winning streaks list (28), five games behind the Los Angeles Lakers' 33-game win streak. During this game Draymond Green recorded a five-by-five game, with 24 points, 11 rebounds, 8 assists, 5 steals and 5 blocks. The feat of recording at least 20 points, 10 rebounds, five assists, five steals and five blocks has only been achieved seven times by three different players (including five times by Hakeem Olajuwon). (Note: Statistics for steals and blocks were not kept in the NBA until the 1973–74 season, so NBA five-by-fives were only possible from that season onward. Stat based on records since 1983–84 season. There may be other players who achieved this before that date.) Since the 1983–84 NBA season, only 16 players have recorded a 5x5 line. The winning streak to start the season ended at 24 games when they were beaten by the Milwaukee Bucks, 108–95. The loss also ended their 28-game winning streak (dating to the 2014–15 regular season), the second-longest in NBA history. (Note: The longest, 33 games won by the Los Angeles Lakers, also ended in Milwaukee.) The Warriors finished the 2015 calendar year with a 72–12 (.857) record between two seasons, the second-best winning percentage in NBA history. They went 88–17 (.838) including play-off games.

==== January/February ====
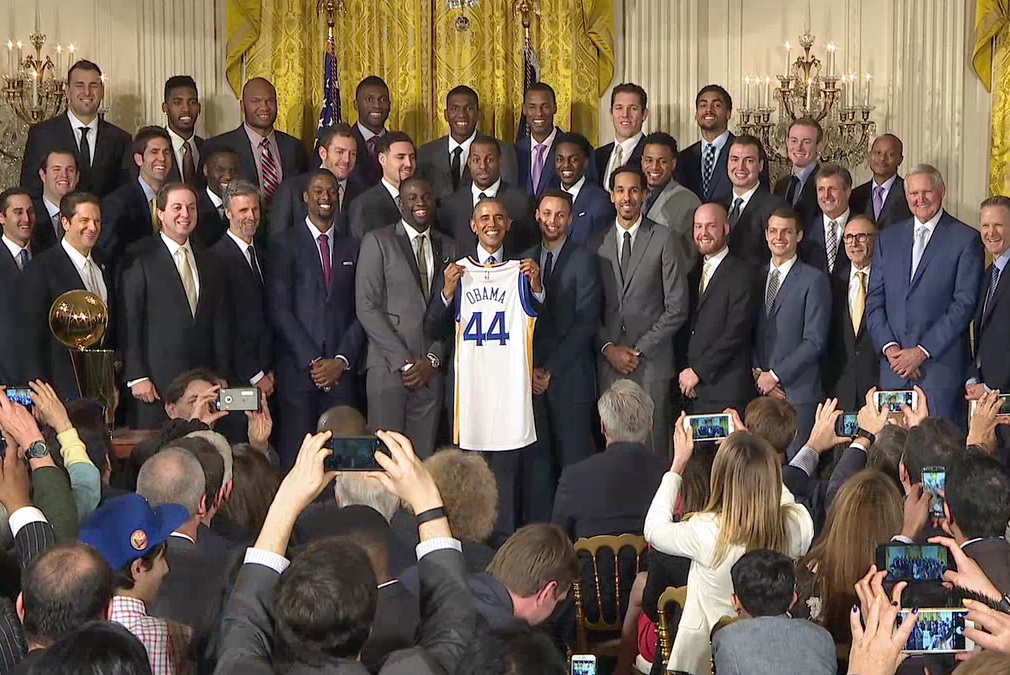
President Barack Obama welcomed the Golden State Warriors to the White House on February 4, 2016, to honor their 2015 NBA Championship win.

In a win against the New York Knicks on January 31, Green tied Hall of Famer Tom Gola's franchise record of nine triple-doubles in a season. Golden State reached the NBA All-Star break at 48–4, the best start to an NBA season at this juncture. On February 13, Klay Thompson won the Three-Point Contest at the All-Star weekend, beating Stephen Curry 27–23 in the final round. The 27 points tied Curry's record set the previous year for most points scored in a round. By defeating the Atlanta Hawks on February 22, the Warriors became the fastest team to reach 50 wins in a season, accomplishing this in just 55 games. Golden State also had 30 assists in a game for the 29th time this season, setting a new franchise record. On February 27, the Warriors defeated the Oklahoma City Thunder and won their 29th road game of the season, breaking the franchise record of 28 which they set last season. They also became the fastest team ever in NBA history to clinch a playoff berth, accomplishing it in just 58 games. They bettered the 1985–86 Boston Celtics by just one day. This was also the earliest a team had clinched a playoff spot in February since the 1987–88 Los Angeles Lakers (although the 2015–16 season started almost two weeks earlier than the 1987–88 season did within their respective calendar years). In this game, Stephen Curry also broke the single season three-point record (286), a record that he himself held, by making his 287th and 288th three-pointers of the season as two of his 12 three-pointers of the game, tying the single game NBA three-point record (jointly holding it with Kobe Bryant and Donyell Marshall).

==== March ====
On March 3, the Warriors tied the 1995–96 Chicago Bulls for the longest regular-season home-game winning streak in NBA history (44 games), with a 121–106 victory at home against the Oklahoma City Thunder. The Warriors' win streak dated back to the previous year. Entering the game on March 6, the Los Angeles Lakers (.190) and Golden State (.917) had a .727 difference in win percentage, making the Lakers' blowout 112–95 win the biggest upset in NBA history. On March 7, the Warriors won their 45th-straight regular season home game over the Orlando Magic, eclipsing the 1995–96 Chicago Bulls 44 wins in a row, to claim the NBA record. Stephen Curry became the first player in NBA history to score 300 three-pointers in a single season. In a 128–112 win over the Portland Trail Blazers on March 11, both teams combined for 37 made three-pointers (18 by the Warriors, 19 by the Blazers), an all-time NBA record. With a Los Angeles Clippers' loss to the Cleveland Cavaliers on March 13, the Warriors officially clinched the Pacific Division title for second consecutive season and fourth time overall. By defeating the New Orleans Pelicans on March 14, the Warriors became the fastest team to reach 60 wins in a season, accomplishing this in just 66 games. With a road win over the Minnesota Timberwolves on March 21, Golden State became only the ninth team in NBA history to achieve 31 wins on the road in the regular season. The Warriors finished the Pacific Division with a 15–1 (.938) record, the best intradivisional record in franchise history.

In a 128–120 win over the Dallas Mavericks on March 25, both teams combined for 39 made three-pointers (21 by the Warriors, 18 by the Mavericks), an all-time NBA record, which beat the 37 set by the Warriors and Blazers two weeks earlier. Golden State also eclipsed the previous record for most three-pointers in a single season by a team in NBA history (933) that had been set by the Houston Rockets the previous year. The Warriors dished out 32 assists against the Philadelphia 76ers on March 27, the 39th time this season the team has had a 30-assist game; the most in the NBA since the 1991–92 Chicago Bulls finished with 40. With their 102–94 win against the Washington Wizards on March 29, the Warriors tied their franchise record of most wins in a single season (67) which had been set the previous year. The Warriors earned their franchise record 68th victory of the season with a 103–96 win in overtime against the Utah Jazz on March 30. They improved to 6–0 in overtime this season, extending a franchise record for OT wins in a single season. Draymond Green became the first player in NBA history with 1,000 points, 500 rebounds, 500 assists, 100 steals and 100 blocks in a season.

==== April ====
On April 1, Golden State lost at home for the first time since January 27, 2015. They fell to the Boston Celtics 109–106 and snapped a 54-game regular-season home winning streak. Their home record for this season dropped to 36–1 with the loss. Golden State became the first team in NBA history to score 1,000 three-pointers in a single season during their 136–111 win against the Portland Trail Blazers. The win was Golden State's 69th of the season, making them the fourth team in NBA history to record at least 69 wins in a season, along with the 1971–72 Los Angeles Lakers and 1995–96/1996–97 Chicago Bulls teams. The Warriors became the first team since the 1991–92 Chicago Bulls to record 40 games with at least 30 assists in a single season. By defeating the San Antonio Spurs on April 7, the Warriors became only the 2nd team in NBA history to reach 70 wins in a season, joining the 72-win 1995–96 Chicago Bulls. After defeating the Spurs again on April 10, the Warriors tied the NBA record for most regular-season wins with 72, previously set by the 1995–96 Chicago Bulls. Golden State snapped a 33-game regular season losing streak against the Spurs in San Antonio (lasting since February 14, 1997), the second longest such streak against one team in NBA history. The Warriors also ended the Spurs' NBA record 39 home wins to start the season (in total a 48-game home winning streak dating back to the previous season.) Golden State became the first team in NBA history to go the entire regular season without back-to-back losses and the first team in NBA history to go the entire regular season without losing to the same team twice.

The Warriors broke the 1995–96 Chicago Bulls' record for best regular season in NBA history after defeating the Memphis Grizzlies 125–104 on April 13, finishing with a record of 73–9. With the win, Golden State tied their franchise record for home wins with 39, which they had set the previous season. The Warriors finished the season at an NBA-record 64 games above .500. Curry made 10 three-pointers against Memphis, making him the first player in NBA history to hit 400 threes in a single season; he finished with 402. Curry finished the season averaging 30.1 points per game, making him the first Warriors NBA scoring champion since Rick Barry in the 1966–67 NBA season. Curry became the seventh player to enter the 50–40–90 club, where he shot 50% for field goals, 45% for three-pointers and 91% for free throws during an entire regular season. This feat has only been achieved eleven times by seven players (Steve Nash having done it four times).

=== Postseason ===
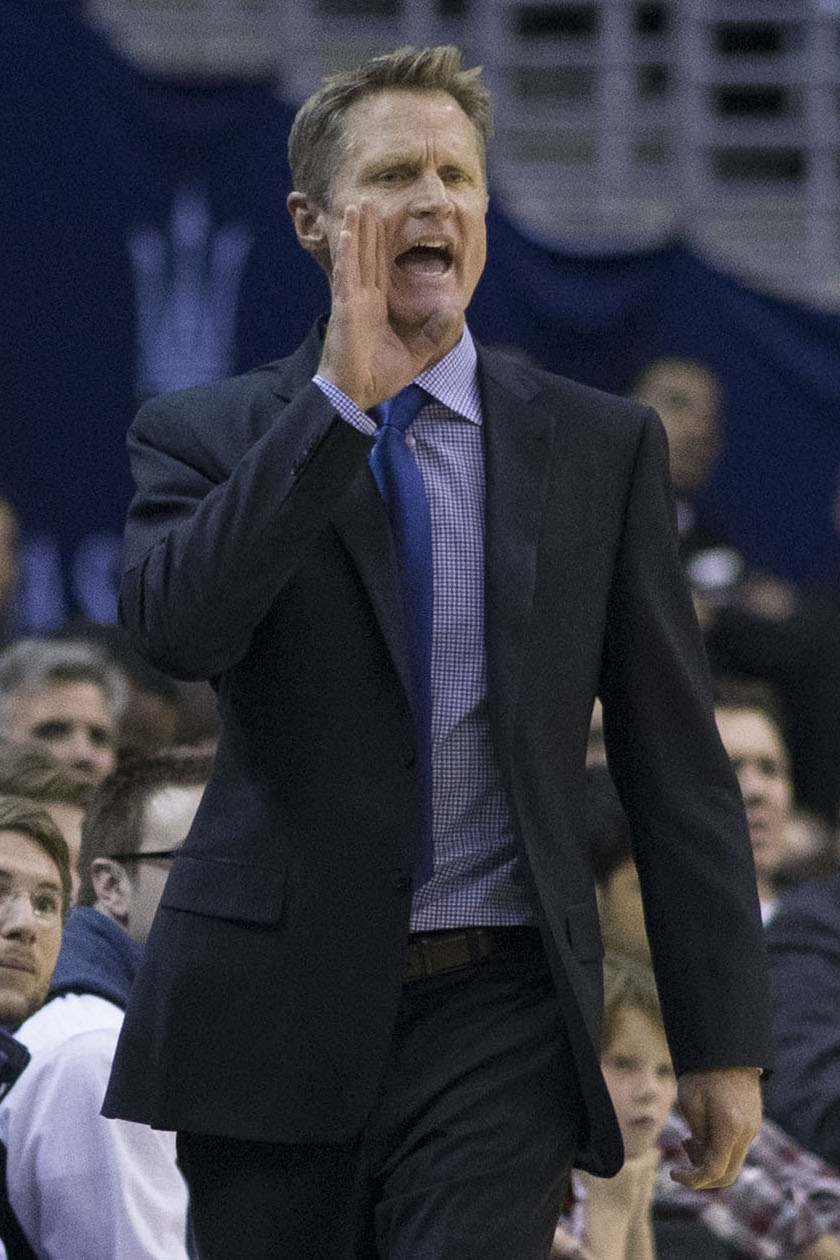
Coach Steve Kerr led the Warriors to an NBA record 73–9 regular season, eclipsing the 72–10 of the 1995–96 Chicago Bulls team he was a player on.

Golden State beat the Houston Rockets 121–94 on April 24 to go up 3–1 in the first round series, in doing so they set the NBA record for threes made in a playoff game, hitting 21-of-40 (.525). Steve Kerr was named Coach of the Year on April 26, the third Warriors coach to win the award after Alex Hannum in 1963–64 and Don Nelson in 1991–92. Under Kerr's leadership the Warriors led the league in scoring (114.9 points), field goal percentage (.487), three-point percentage (.416), assists (28.9), point differential (+10.8) and offensive rating (112.5 points per 100 possessions), while becoming the first team in league history to hit 1,000 three-pointers in a single season with an NBA-record 1,077 triples. Kerr held an overall regular-season record of 140–24 (.854) in his first two seasons with the Warriors. The Warriors eliminated the Houston Rockets on April 27 with a blowout victory of 114–81, winning the series 4–1 and progressing to the Western Conference Semi-finals to face the Portland Trail Blazers. Klay Thompson became the first player in NBA history to make at least seven three-pointers in consecutive playoff games.

==== May ====
On May 9, a 132–125 OT win over the Portland Trail Blazers put Golden State up 3–1 in the series, Steph Curry scored 40 points in his first game back after being out injured for 15 days with an MCL sprain. He scored 17 of his points in overtime, which broke the NBA record of 16 held by Gilbert Arenas for most points scored in an overtime period (regular-season or postseason). Stephen Curry was named Most Valuable Player on May 10, making it the third time a Warrior had won the award after Wilt Chamberlain won in the 1959–60 NBA season and Curry in 2014–15. Curry is the 11th player to win back-to-back MVP honors and is the first unanimous winner in NBA history with all 131 first-place votes. On May 11, the Warriors beat the Trail Blazers 125–121 in Game 5 to clinch the series and advance to the Western Conference finals for the second consecutive year, where they faced the Oklahoma City Thunder. In the game, Curry continued his streak of making a three-pointer in every playoff game he's ever played in and tied the NBA playoff record set by Reggie Miller of 44-straight.

In their 95th and 96th games of the season, Golden State lost back-to-back games for the first time all season (105–133 and 94–118 losses to the Thunder, putting them down 1–3 in the Western Conference finals). On May 26, Stephen Curry, Draymond Green and Klay Thompson were named to the 2015–16 All-NBA Team, the first time three Warriors have earned the accolade since the 1955–56 season when Neil Johnston, Paul Arizin, and Jack George were selected. Curry was unanimously selected for first team honors, Green for the second team and Thompson got third team recognition. The Warriors tied the Western Conference finals series at 3–3 on May 28, with a 108–101 road win over the Thunder. Klay Thompson made eleven three-pointers, breaking the NBA playoff record of nine. Golden State tied their franchise record for most three-pointers made in a playoff game with 21. Golden State also set a new franchise record for wins with their 84th of the season (regular-season and postseason combined), surpassing the 83 from the 2014–15 season. In Game 7, the Warriors defeated the Thunder 96–88, becoming only the 10th team (out of 233 teams) in NBA history to overcome a 3–1 series deficit. The win was their 85th of the year. It was the second time in NBA history that the defending champions came back from a 3–1 deficit in the conference finals, after the 1978–79 Washington Bullets. Golden State reached the NBA Finals for the second straight year, making this the franchise's first appearances in back-to-back NBA Finals since the 1946–47 season and 1947–48 season. The Warriors faced the Cleveland Cavaliers in a rematch of the 2015 NBA Finals.

==== June ====
===== NBA Finals =====
In Game 1 on June 2, Golden State beat Cleveland 104–89. The Warriors were led by their bench, with Shaun Livingston scoring a team-high 20 points. The 35-point bench advantage (45–10) the Warriors had over the Cavs is the largest by any team in the Finals in the last 50 years. The Warriors won Game 2 by a blowout 110–77, to go up 2–0 in the series. Golden State won the first 2 games by a combined 48 points, the largest point-differential through first 2 games in NBA Finals history. After Golden State lost Game 3 by a blowout 120–90, they came back in Game 4 to win 108–97, to take a 3–1 series lead. The Warriors made 17 three-pointers, an NBA record for a single Finals game. The Warriors' win in Game 4 was their 88th of the season, which broke the 1995–96 Chicago Bulls record of 87 for most wins in an NBA season (regular-season and postseason combined). Late in the fourth quarter of Game 4, Draymond Green and LeBron James got into a scuffle. Green was retroactively charged with a Flagrant Foul 1 for swiping James in the groin and received a one-game suspension for Game 5, after accumulating his fourth flagrant foul point in the playoffs, and James was given a technical foul for taunting Green. The Cavaliers capitalized on Green's absence by beating the Warriors in Game 5 by a score of 112–97.

After serving his suspension, Green returned to play in Game 6. Game 6 was played on June 16, exactly one year after Golden State won Game 6 of the 2015 NBA Finals, which was also played in Cleveland. Unlike in the 2015 NBA Finals, however, the Warriors failed to clinch the title in Game 6. The Warriors were outscored 31–11 by the Cavaliers in the first quarter, and Cleveland never relinquished their lead as Golden State lost 115–101. This was only the second time in 105 games this season (regular-season and postseason) that the Warriors lost consecutive games. The loss evened the series at three games apiece, forcing a Game 7, the first Game 7 in an NBA Finals appearance in Golden State franchise history. During the fourth quarter of Game 6, Stephen Curry, who set the record for most three-pointers in an NBA Finals series during the game (28), fouled out with his sixth personal foul. Curry angrily responded by throwing his mouthguard into the stands and hit a fan, which resulted in a technical foul and the first ejection of his career. It was the first time in 20 years that a player had been ejected from an NBA Finals game. After the game, Curry received a $25,000 fine for his actions, but was not suspended for Game 7. Warriors head coach Steve Kerr also received a $25,000 fine for his criticism of the officiating, which he felt was biased against Curry, in the post-game press conference.

On June 19, 2016, Golden State lost Game 7, 93–89, becoming the first team in NBA history to squander a 3–1 lead in the NBA Finals. They also became the first team in NBA history to overcome a 1–3 deficit and lose a 3–1 lead in the same playoffs. The Warriors are the 11th team in NBA history to lose a 3–1 series lead and just the fourth team in NBA history to lose an NBA Finals' Game 7 on their home court. The loss marked the first time since Steve Kerr became head coach that the Warriors had lost three straight games. Golden State became the first team in NBA history to finish with the same number of regular-season and postseason losses (9). They also became the first team in NBA history with 69 or more regular season wins that failed to win the NBA Championship.

== Records ==
Golden State broke numerous regular-season, postseason, and franchise records this year, both as a team and individually.

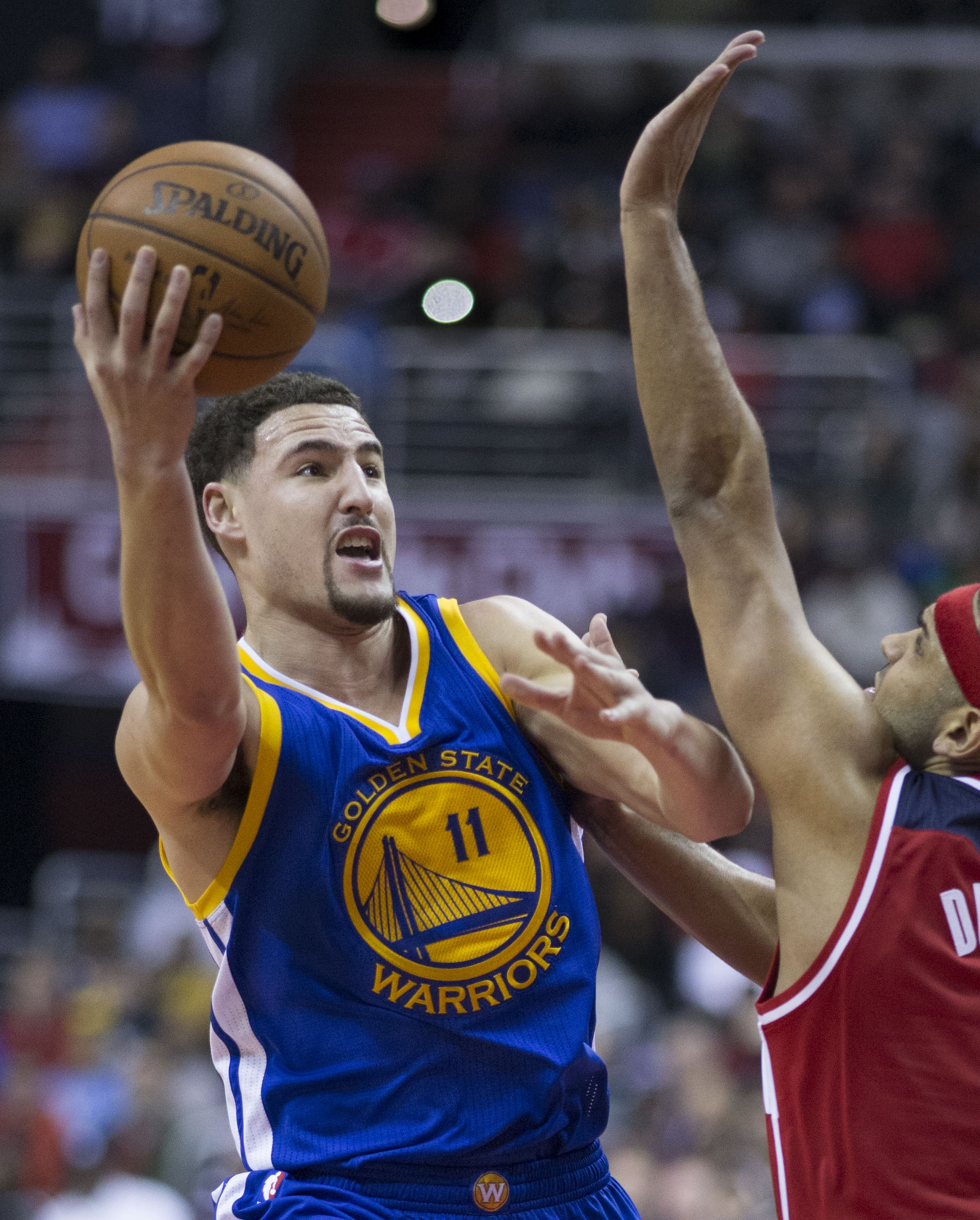
Klay Thompson set an NBA record for most three-pointers made in a playoff game with eleven.

=== NBA records ===
==== Team ====
- Best regular-season record: 73–9
- Most wins (regular-season and postseason combined): 88 (88–18 overall record (0.830), the 1995–96 Chicago Bulls went 87–13 (.870), holding a better win percentage with only 3 postseason losses.)
- Most road wins in a regular season: 34
- Most road wins (regular-season and postseason combined): 38 (tied with the 1995–96 Chicago Bulls)
- Best start: 24–0
- Best road start: 14–0
- Best start (number of losses): Golden State has the best start in NBA history for every number of losses from 0 to 9 except 3. The Warriors stand alone holding the best record in NBA history for 51 of the total 82 games in the regular season. They slipped off their record setting pace for only four games of the regular season, and were tied for the other 27 games with the pace of such championship winning teams as the 1966–67 Philadelphia 76ers, 1971–72 Los Angeles Lakers, and 1995–96 Chicago Bulls.

- 0: 24–0 (1.000)
- 1: 29–1 (.967)
- 2: 36–2 (.947)
- 4: 48–4 (.923)
- 5: 55–5 (.917)
- 6: 62–6 (.912)
- 7: 68–7 (.907)
- 8: 69–8 (.896)
- 9: 73–9 (.890)

- Longest home winning streak: 54 (dating back to 2014–15 season)
- Most home wins (regular-season and postseason combined): 50 (tied with the 1985–86 and 1986–87 Boston Celtics)
- Most three-pointers made in a regular season: 1,077 (averaging an NBA record 13.1 per game, while shooting .416)
- Most three-pointers made in a postseason: 306 (surpassing their own playoff record of 240 from their 2015 Championship run)
- Most three-pointers made in a playoff game: 21 (on April 24, 2016, against the Houston Rockets. The Cleveland Cavaliers broke the record by making 25 against the Atlanta Hawks two weeks later.)
- Most three-pointers made in a seven-game series: 90 (against the Oklahoma City Thunder)
- Most three-pointers made in a single NBA Finals game: 17 (Game 4 against the Cavaliers)
- Back-to-back losses in regular season: 0 (only team in NBA history to go the whole regular season without consecutive losses.)
- Multiple losses to same opponent in regular season: 0 (only team in NBA history to go the whole regular season without losing to the same opponent more than once.)
- Best record in a 41-game stretch (including playoffs): 39-2 (last 3 games in the 2015 NBA Finals, plus by January 11, 2016, a 36–2 start of the 2015–16 season. That tied the Lakers as the best record in a 41-game stretch in NBA history. The Lakers went 23–1 at the end of the 2000-01 regular season and playoffs, then went 16–1 to start the 2001-02 season.

==== Individual ====
- Most three-pointers made in a regular season: 402 (Stephen Curry)
- Most three-pointers made in a single playoff game: 11 (Klay Thompson)
- Most consecutive games (regular-season and postseason combined) with a made three-pointer: 191 (Stephen Curry, finished season with streak still active)
- Most consecutive regular-season games with a made three-pointer: 152 (Stephen Curry, previous record of 127 held by Kyle Korver. Finished season with streak still active)
- Most consecutive playoff games with a made three-pointer: 58 (Stephen Curry, previous record of 44 held by Reggie Miller. Finished season with streak still active)
- Most three-pointers made in a playoff series: 32 (Stephen Curry) (accomplished in both Western Conference finals and again in NBA Finals)
- Most three-pointers made in an NBA Finals series: 32 (Stephen Curry)
- Most three-pointers made in an NBA Finals Game 7: 6 (Draymond Green, tied with Shane Battier)
- Most points scored in an overtime period: 17 (Stephen Curry)

=== Franchise records ===
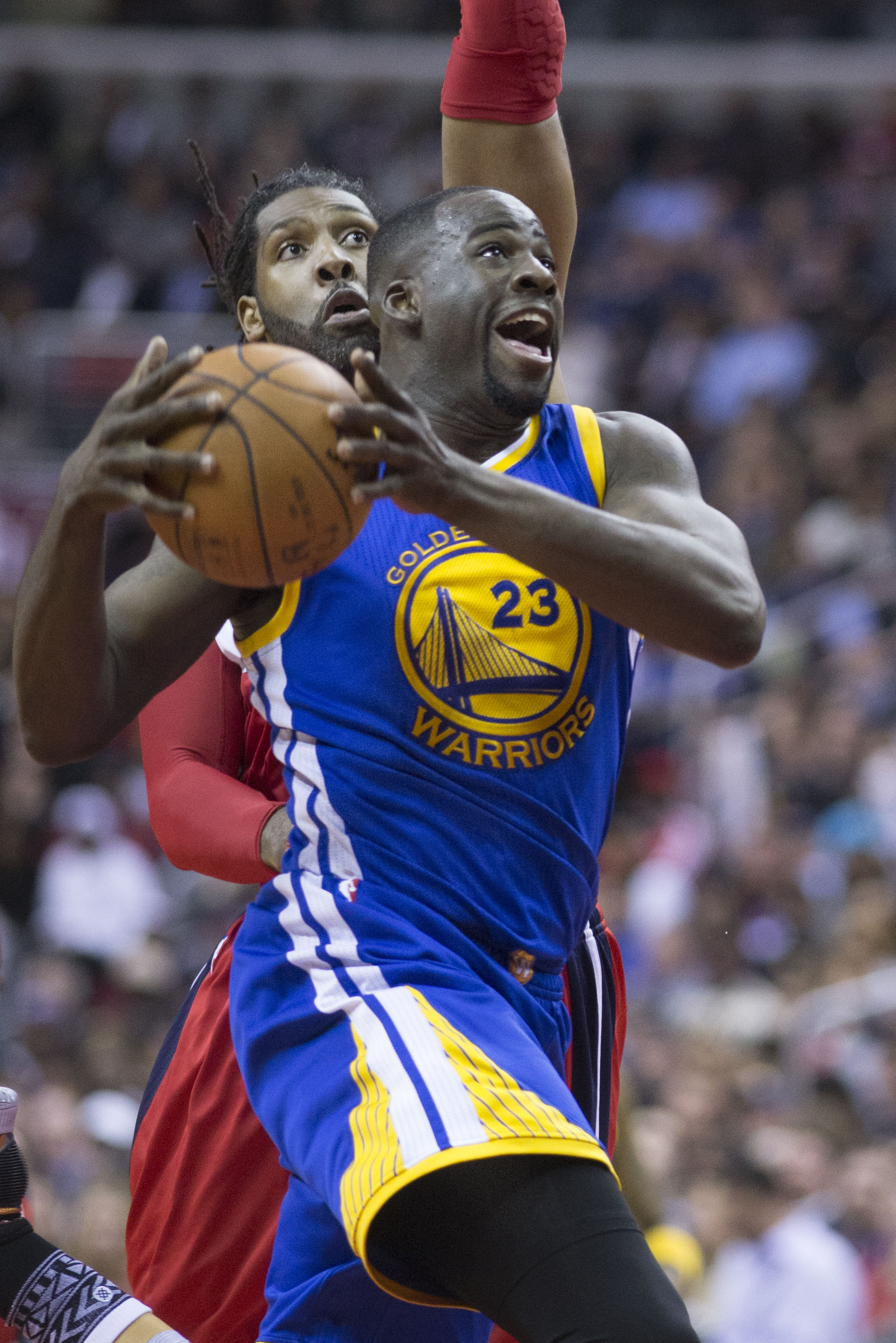
Draymond Green had thirteen triple-doubles this season, which broke the Golden State franchise record of nine.

==== Team ====
- Most home wins in a regular season: 39 (tied with 2014–15 season)
- Best home start in a regular season: 36–0
- Most consecutive road wins: 14
- Most wins in a single month: 16 in November, 2015 (tied with March, 2015)
- Best intradivisional record: 15–1 (.938) in the Pacific Division
- Most assists in a regular season: 2,373 (28.9 assists per game), the 13th most in NBA history.
- Most games with 30+ assists in a regular season: 43 (record was 28 set in 2014–15 season)
- Point-differential per game in regular season: +10.76 (the 6th largest winning margin in NBA history)
- Points per game in regular season: 114.5 (the 12th best points average per game in NBA history)
- Most overtime wins in a regular season: 6 (6–1 overall record)
- Most three-pointers made in a single game: 22 (against the Phoenix Suns on November 29, 2015)
- Three-point field goal percentage: .416 (second best in NBA history behind the 1996–97 Charlotte Hornets' .428)

==== Individual ====
- Most triple-doubles in a regular season: 13 (Draymond Green)

== Draft ==
Round	Pick	Player	Position	Nationality	College
1	30	Kevon Looney	PF	United States	UCLA (Fr.)

== Pre-season ==
2015 pre-season game log
Total: 3–4 (home: 2–1; road: 1–3)
Pre-season: 3–4 (home: 2–1; road: 1–3)

Game	Date	Team	Score	High points	High rebounds	High assists	Location Attendance	Record
1	October 5	Toronto	95–87	Leandro Barbosa (15)	Green, Ezeli (6)	Draymond Green (15)	SAP Center; 18,223	1–0
2	October 8	@ Portland	101–118	Stephen Curry (30)	Draymond Green (8)	Stephen Curry (7)	Moda Center; 19,303	1–1
3	October 13	Denver	103–114	Leandro Barbosa (16)	Draymond Green (9)	Stephen Curry (7)	Oracle Arena; 19,596	1–2
4	October 15	Houston	123–101	Stephen Curry (19)	Marreese Speights (8)	Stephen Curry (6)	Oracle Arena; 19,596	2–2
5	October 17	@ L.A. Lakers	70–85	Stephen Curry (19)	Jason Thompson (11)	Stephen Curry (4)	Valley View Casino Center; 14,100	2–3
6	October 20	@ L.A. Clippers	95–130	Klay Thompson (21)	Draymond Green (7)	Klay Thompson (5)	STAPLES Center; 15,889	2–4
7	October 22	@ L.A. Lakers	136–97	Curry, Thompson (24)	Marreese Speights (7)	Stephen Curry (10)	Honda Center; 16,222	3–4

2015–16 season schedule

== Regular season ==
=== Standings ===
==== Division ====
Pacific Division	W	L	PCT	GB	Home	Road	Div	GP
z – Golden State Warriors	73	9	.890	–	39‍–‍2	34‍–‍7	15–1	82
x – Los Angeles Clippers	53	29	.646	20.0	29‍–‍12	24‍–‍17	9–7	82
e – Sacramento Kings	33	49	.402	40.0	18‍–‍23	15‍–‍26	8–8	82
e – Phoenix Suns	23	59	.280	50.0	14‍–‍27	9‍–‍32	6–10	82
e – Los Angeles Lakers	17	65	.207	56.0	12‍–‍29	5‍–‍36	2–14	82

==== Conference ====
Western Conference
#	Team	W	L	PCT	GB	GP
1	z – Golden State Warriors *	73	9	.890	–	82
2	y – San Antonio Spurs *	67	15	.817	6.0	82
3	y – Oklahoma City Thunder *	55	27	.671	18.0	82
4	x – Los Angeles Clippers	53	29	.646	20.0	82
5	x – Portland Trail Blazers	44	38	.537	29.0	82
6	x – Dallas Mavericks	42	40	.512	31.0	82
7	x – Memphis Grizzlies	42	40	.512	31.0	82
8	x – Houston Rockets	41	41	.500	32.0	82
9	e – Utah Jazz	40	42	.488	33.0	82
10	e – Sacramento Kings	33	49	.402	40.0	82
11	e – Denver Nuggets	33	49	.402	40.0	82
12	e – New Orleans Pelicans	30	52	.366	43.0	82
13	e – Minnesota Timberwolves	29	53	.354	44.0	82
14	e – Phoenix Suns	23	59	.280	50.0	82
15	e – Los Angeles Lakers	17	65	.207	56.0	82

=== Game log ===
2015–16 game log
Total: 73–9 (home: 39–2; road: 34–7)
October: 3–0 (home: 1–0; road: 2–0)

Game	Date	Team	Score	High points	High rebounds	High assists	Location Attendance	Record
1	October 27	New Orleans	W 111–95	Stephen Curry (40)	Harrison Barnes (9)	Stephen Curry (7)	Oracle Arena; 19,596	1–0
2	October 30	@ Houston	W 112–92	Stephen Curry (25)	3 players tied (7)	Draymond Green (7)	Toyota Center; 18,142	2–0
3	October 31	@ New Orleans	W 134–120	Stephen Curry (53)	Barnes, Iguodala (7)	Stephen Curry (9)	Smoothie King Center; 18,406	3–0

November : 16–0 (home: 9–0; road: 7–0)

Game	Date	Team	Score	High points	High rebounds	High assists	Location Attendance	Record
4	November 2	Memphis	W 119–69	Stephen Curry (30)	Festus Ezeli (10)	Draymond Green (8)	Oracle Arena; 19,596	4–0
5	November 4	L.A. Clippers	W 112–108	Stephen Curry (31)	Harrison Barnes (9)	3 players tied (5)	Oracle Arena; 19,596	5–0
6	November 6	Denver	W 119–104	Stephen Curry (34)	Draymond Green (9)	Stephen Curry (10)	Oracle Arena; 19,596	6–0
7	November 7	@ Sacramento	W 103–94	Stephen Curry (24)	Festus Ezeli (12)	Draymond Green (7)	Sleep Train Arena; 17,317	7–0
8	November 9	Detroit	W 109–95	Klay Thompson (24)	Draymond Green (10)	Draymond Green (9)	Oracle Arena; 19,596	8–0
9	November 11	@ Memphis	W 100–84	Stephen Curry (28)	Bogut, Thompson (7)	Stephen Curry (5)	FedEx Forum; 18,119	9–0
10	November 12	@ Minnesota	W 129–116	Stephen Curry (46)	Draymond Green (8)	Draymond Green (12)	Target Center; 16,130	10–0
11	November 14	Brooklyn	W 107–99 (OT)	Stephen Curry (34)	Andrew Bogut (18)	Draymond Green (12)	Oracle Arena; 19,596	11–0
12	November 17	Toronto	W 115–110	Stephen Curry (37)	Draymond Green (9)	Stephen Curry (9)	Oracle Arena; 19,596	12–0
13	November 19	@ L.A. Clippers	W 124–117	Stephen Curry (40)	Stephen Curry (11)	Draymond Green (9)	STAPLES Center; 19,528	13–0
14	November 20	Chicago	W 106–94	Stephen Curry (27)	3 players tied (9)	Draymond Green (5)	Oracle Arena; 19,596	14–0
15	November 22	@ Denver	W 118–105	Klay Thompson (21)	Draymond Green (7)	Curry, Thompson (7)	Pepsi Center; 17,689	15–0
16	November 24	L.A. Lakers	W 111–77	Stephen Curry (24)	Andre Iguodala (9)	Stephen Curry (9)	Oracle Arena; 19,596	16–0
17	November 27	@ Phoenix	W 135–116	Stephen Curry (41)	Draymond Green (10)	Draymond Green (10)	Talking Stick Resort Arena; 18,055	17–0
18	November 28	Sacramento	W 120–101	Stephen Curry (19)	Ezeli, Green (11)	Draymond Green (12)	Oracle Arena; 19,596	18–0
19	November 30	@ Utah	W 106–103	Stephen Curry (26)	Draymond Green (9)	Draymond Green (7)	Vivint Smart Home Arena; 19,911	19–0

December : 11–2 (home: 5–0; road: 6–2)

Game	Date	Team	Score	High points	High rebounds	High assists	Location Attendance	Record
20	December 2	@ Charlotte	W 116–99	Stephen Curry (40)	Bogut, Green (11)	Draymond Green (9)	Time Warner Cable Arena; 19,542	20–0
21	December 5	@ Toronto	W 112–109	Stephen Curry (44)	Festus Ezeli (10)	Stephen Curry (7)	Air Canada Centre; 20,160	21–0
22	December 6	@ Brooklyn	W 114–98	Stephen Curry (28)	Green, Iguodala (9)	Draymond Green (7)	Barclays Center; 17,732	22–0
23	December 8	@ Indiana	W 131–123	Klay Thompson (39)	Andrew Bogut (10)	Stephen Curry (10)	Bankers Life Fieldhouse; 18,165	23–0
24	December 11	@ Boston	W 124–119 (2OT)	Stephen Curry (38)	Festus Ezeli (12)	Curry, Green (8)	TD Garden; 18,624	24–0
25	December 12	@ Milwaukee	L 95–108	Stephen Curry (28)	Draymond Green (11)	3 players tied (5)	Bradley Center; 18,717	24–1
26	December 16	Phoenix	W 128–103	Klay Thompson (43)	Andrew Bogut (12)	Draymond Green (10)	Oracle Arena; 19,596	25–1
27	December 18	Milwaukee	W 121–112	Klay Thompson (27)	Curry, Ezeli (10)	Stephen Curry (9)	Oracle Arena; 19,596	26–1
28	December 23	Utah	W 103–85	Klay Thompson (20)	Andrew Bogut (13)	Stephen Curry (9)	Oracle Arena; 19,596	27–1
29	December 25	Cleveland	W 89–83	Draymond Green (22)	Draymond Green (15)	Curry, Green (7)	Oracle Arena; 19,596	28–1
30	December 28	Sacramento	W 122–103	Klay Thompson (29)	Stephen Curry (14)	Stephen Curry (10)	Oracle Arena; 19,596	29–1
31	December 30	@ Dallas	L 91–114	Ian Clark (21)	Andrew Bogut (10)	Green, Livingston (4)	American Airlines Center; 20,494	29–2
32	December 31	@ Houston	W 114–110	Klay Thompson (38)	Bogut, Green, (11)	Draymond Green (16)	Toyota Center; 18,313	30–2

January : 14–2 (home: 7–0; road: 7–2)

Game	Date	Team	Score	High points	High rebounds	High assists	Location Attendance	Record
33	January 2	Denver	W 111–108 (OT)	Draymond Green (29)	Draymond Green (17)	Draymond Green (14)	Oracle Arena; 19,596	31–2
34	January 4	Charlotte	W 111–101	Curry, Thompson (30)	Draymond Green (15)	Draymond Green (10)	Oracle Arena; 19,596	32–2
35	January 5	@ L.A. Lakers	W 109–88	Klay Thompson (36)	Draymond Green (12)	Clark, Curry (6)	STAPLES Center; 18,997	33–2
36	January 8	@ Portland	W 128–108	Klay Thompson (36)	Draymond Green (13)	Draymond Green (10)	Moda Center; 20,035	34–2
37	January 9	@ Sacramento	W 128–116	Stephen Curry (38)	Andrew Bogut (11)	Stephen Curry (11)	Sleep Train Arena; 17,317	35–2
38	January 11	Miami	W 111–103	Stephen Curry (31)	Draymond Green (12)	3 players tied (6)	Oracle Arena; 19,596	36–2
39	January 13	@ Denver	L 110–112	Stephen Curry (38)	Andrew Bogut (7)	Stephen Curry (9)	Pepsi Center; 18,004	36–3
40	January 14	L.A. Lakers	W 116–98	Stephen Curry (26)	Draymond Green (9)	Draymond Green (5)	Oracle Arena; 19,596	37–3
41	January 16	@ Detroit	L 95–113	Stephen Curry (38)	Festus Ezeli (10)	Draymond Green (9)	The Palace of Auburn Hills; 21,584	37–4
42	January 18	@ Cleveland	W 132–98	Stephen Curry (35)	Draymond Green (7)	Draymond Green (10)	Quicken Loans Arena; 20,562	38–4
43	January 20	@ Chicago	W 125–94	Stephen Curry (25)	Andrew Bogut (12)	Stephen Curry (11)	United Center; 23,152	39–4
44	January 22	Indiana	W 122–110	Stephen Curry (39)	Barnes, Green (11)	Stephen Curry (12)	Oracle Arena; 19,596	40–4
45	January 25	San Antonio	W 120–90	Stephen Curry (37)	Draymond Green (9)	Draymond Green (6)	Oracle Arena; 19,596	41–4
46	January 27	Dallas	W 127–107	Klay Thompson (45)	Andrew Bogut (9)	Stephen Curry (9)	Oracle Arena; 19,596	42–4
47	January 30	@ Philadelphia	W 108–105	Klay Thompson (32)	Andrew Bogut (16)	Draymond Green (9)	Wells Fargo Center; 20,798	43–4
48	January 31	@ New York	W 116–95	Klay Thompson (34)	Andrew Bogut (12)	Draymond Green (10)	Madison Square Garden; 19,812	44–4

February : 9–1 (home: 2–0; road: 7–1)

Game	Date	Team	Score	High points	High rebounds	High assists	Location Attendance	Record
49	February 3	@ Washington	W 134–121	Stephen Curry (51)	Draymond Green (10)	Draymond Green (12)	Verizon Center; 20,356	45–4
50	February 6	Oklahoma City	W 116–108	Stephen Curry (26)	Draymond Green (14)	Stephen Curry (10)	Oracle Arena; 19,596	46–4
51	February 9	Houston	W 123–110	Stephen Curry (35)	Andrew Bogut (11)	Stephen Curry (9)	Oracle Arena; 19,596	47–4
52	February 10	@ Phoenix	W 112–104	Stephen Curry (26)	Bogut, Curry (9)	Stephen Curry (9)	Talking Stick Resort Arena; 18,055	48–4
All-Star Break
53	February 19	@ Portland	L 105–137	Stephen Curry (31)	Draymond Green (12)	Draymond Green (8)	Moda Center; 20,100	48–5
54	February 20	@ L.A. Clippers	W 115–112	Klay Thompson (32)	Draymond Green (11)	Draymond Green (10)	STAPLES Center; 19,585	49–5
55	February 22	@ Atlanta	W 102–92	Stephen Curry (36)	Draymond Green (14)	Draymond Green (9)	Philips Arena; 19,330	50–5
56	February 24	@ Miami	W 118–112	Stephen Curry (42)	Draymond Green (11)	Stephen Curry (7)	American Airlines Arena; 19,899	51–5
57	February 25	@ Orlando	W 130–114	Stephen Curry (51)	Stephen Curry (7)	Curry, Green (8)	Amway Center; 19,189	52–5
58	February 27	@ Oklahoma City	W 121–118 (OT)	Stephen Curry (46)	Draymond Green (14)	Draymond Green (14)	Chesapeake Energy Arena; 18,203	53–5

March : 15–2 (home: 12–0; road: 3–2)

Game	Date	Team	Score	High points	High rebounds	High assists	Location Attendance	Record
59	March 1	Atlanta	W 109–105 (OT)	Klay Thompson (26)	Draymond Green (13)	Draymond Green (9)	Oracle Arena; 19,596	54–5
60	March 3	Oklahoma City	W 121–106	Stephen Curry (33)	Draymond Green (8)	Shaun Livingston (8)	Oracle Arena; 19,596	55–5
61	March 6	@ L.A. Lakers	L 95–112	Stephen Curry (18)	Draymond Green (10)	Draymond Green (9)	STAPLES Center; 18,997	55–6
62	March 7	Orlando	W 119–113	Stephen Curry (41)	Stephen Curry (13)	Draymond Green (10)	Oracle Arena; 19,596	56–6
63	March 9	Utah	W 115–94	Klay Thompson (23)	Draymond Green (7)	Stephen Curry (10)	Oracle Arena; 19,596	57–6
64	March 11	Portland	W 128–112	Klay Thompson (37)	Draymond Green (13)	Draymond Green (7)	Oracle Arena; 19,596	58–6
65	March 12	Phoenix	W 123–116	Stephen Curry (35)	Barnes, Speights (9)	3 players tied (6)	Oracle Arena; 19,596	59–6
66	March 14	New Orleans	W 125–107	Stephen Curry (27)	Draymond Green (12)	Stephen Curry (5)	Oracle Arena; 19,596	60–6
67	March 16	New York	W 121–85	Stephen Curry (34)	Draymond Green (11)	Draymond Green (10)	Oracle Arena; 19,596	61–6
68	March 18	@ Dallas	W 130–112	Klay Thompson (39)	Stephen Curry (9)	Stephen Curry (10)	American Airlines Center; 20,515	62–6
69	March 19	@ San Antonio	L 79–87	Klay Thompson (15)	Draymond Green (9)	Draymond Green (8)	AT&T Center; 18,825	62–7
70	March 21	@ Minnesota	W 109–104	Draymond Green (24)	Draymond Green (9)	Stephen Curry (11)	Target Center; 19,452	63–7
71	March 23	L.A. Clippers	W 114–98	Stephen Curry (33)	Draymond Green (12)	Stephen Curry (5)	Oracle Arena; 19,596	64–7
72	March 25	Dallas	W 128–120	Klay Thompson (40)	Stephen Curry (8)	Draymond Green (10)	Oracle Arena; 19,596	65–7
73	March 27	Philadelphia	W 117–105	Klay Thompson (40)	Draymond Green (11)	Draymond Green (11)	Oracle Arena; 19,596	66–7
74	March 29	Washington	W 102–94	Stephen Curry (26)	Draymond Green (16)	Draymond Green (9)	Oracle Arena; 19,596	67–7
75	March 30	@ Utah	W 103–96 (OT)	Stephen Curry (31)	Harrison Barnes (11)	Draymond Green (6)	Vivint Smart Home Arena; 19,911	68–7

April : 5–2 (home: 3–2; road: 2–0)

Game	Date	Team	Score	High points	High rebounds	High assists	Location Attendance	Record
76	April 1	Boston	L 106–109	Stephen Curry (29)	Draymond Green (9)	Draymond Green (7)	Oracle Arena; 19,596	68–8
77	April 3	Portland	W 136–111	Stephen Curry (39)	Draymond Green (10)	Draymond Green (10)	Oracle Arena; 19,596	69–8
78	April 5	Minnesota	L 117–124 (OT)	Klay Thompson (28)	Andrew Bogut (15)	Stephen Curry (15)	Oracle Arena; 19,596	69–9
79	April 7	San Antonio	W 112–101	Stephen Curry (27)	Andrew Bogut (11)	Stephen Curry (9)	Oracle Arena; 19,596	70–9
80	April 9	@ Memphis	W 100–99	Draymond Green (23)	Draymond Green (11)	Stephen Curry (8)	FedEx Forum; 18,119	71–9
81	April 10	@ San Antonio	W 92–86	Stephen Curry (37)	Andre Iguodala (7)	Stephen Curry (5)	AT&T Center; 18,658	72–9
82	April 13	Memphis	W 125–104	Stephen Curry (46)	Draymond Green (9)	Shaun Livingston (10)	Oracle Arena; 19,596	73–9

2015–16 season schedule

== Playoffs ==
=== Game log ===
2016 playoff game log
Total: 15–9 (home: 11–3; road: 4–6)
First Round: 4–1 (home: 3–0; road: 1–1)

Game	Date	Team	Score	High points	High rebounds	High assists	Location Attendance	Series
1	April 16	Houston	W 104–78	Stephen Curry (24)	Draymond Green (10)	Andre Iguodala (7)	Oracle Arena; 19,596	1–0
2	April 18	Houston	W 115–106	Klay Thompson (34)	Draymond Green (14)	Draymond Green (8)	Oracle Arena; 19,596	2–0
3	April 21	@ Houston	L 96–97	Marreese Speights (22)	Klay Thompson (8)	Draymond Green (7)	Toyota Center; 18,200	2–1
4	April 24	@ Houston	W 121–94	Klay Thompson (23)	Draymond Green (8)	Shaun Livingston (9)	Toyota Center; 18,200	3–1
5	April 27	Houston	W 114–81	Klay Thompson (27)	Draymond Green (9)	Draymond Green (8)	Oracle Arena; 19,596	4–1

Conference Semifinals: 4–1 (home: 3–0; road: 1–1)

Game	Date	Team	Score	High points	High rebounds	High assists	Location Attendance	Series
1	May 1	Portland	W 118–106	Klay Thompson (37)	Draymond Green (13)	Draymond Green (11)	Oracle Arena; 19,596	1–0
2	May 3	Portland	W 110–99	Klay Thompson (27)	Draymond Green (14)	Draymond Green (7)	Oracle Arena; 19,596	2–0
3	May 7	@ Portland	L 108–120	Draymond Green (37)	Draymond Green (9)	Shaun Livingston (10)	Moda Center; 19,673	2–1
4	May 9	@ Portland	W 132–125 (OT)	Stephen Curry (40)	3 players tied (9)	Stephen Curry (8)	Moda Center; 19,583	3–1
5	May 11	Portland	W 125–121	Klay Thompson (33)	Draymond Green (11)	Stephen Curry (11)	Oracle Arena; 19,596	4–1

Conference Finals: 4–3 (home: 3–1; road: 1–2)

Game	Date	Team	Score	High points	High rebounds	High assists	Location Attendance	Series
1	May 16	Oklahoma City	L 102–108	Stephen Curry (26)	Stephen Curry (10)	Stephen Curry (7)	Oracle Arena; 19,596	0–1
2	May 18	Oklahoma City	W 118–91	Stephen Curry (28)	Draymond Green (8)	Draymond Green (7)	Oracle Arena; 19,596	1–1
3	May 22	@ Oklahoma City	L 105–133	Stephen Curry (24)	Brandon Rush (7)	5 players tied (3)	Chesapeake Energy Arena; 18,203	1–2
4	May 24	@ Oklahoma City	L 94–118	Klay Thompson (26)	Draymond Green (11)	Stephen Curry (5)	Chesapeake Energy Arena; 18,203	1–3
5	May 26	Oklahoma City	W 120–111	Stephen Curry (31)	Andrew Bogut (14)	Andre Iguodala (8)	Oracle Arena; 19,596	2–3
6	May 28	@ Oklahoma City	W 108–101	Klay Thompson (41)	Draymond Green (12)	Stephen Curry (9)	Chesapeake Energy Arena; 18,203	3–3
7	May 30	Oklahoma City	W 96–88	Stephen Curry (36)	Draymond Green (9)	Stephen Curry (8)	Oracle Arena; 19,596	4–3

NBA Finals: 3–4 (home: 2–2; road: 1–2)

Game	Date	Team	Score	High points	High rebounds	High assists	Location Attendance	Series
1	June 2	Cleveland	W 104–89	Shaun Livingston (20)	Draymond Green (11)	Draymond Green (7)	Oracle Arena; 19,596	1–0
2	June 5	Cleveland	W 110–77	Draymond Green (28)	Stephen Curry (9)	3 players tied (5)	Oracle Arena; 19,596	2–0
3	June 8	@ Cleveland	L 90–120	Stephen Curry (19)	Draymond Green (7)	Draymond Green (7)	Quicken Loans Arena; 20,562	2–1
4	June 10	@ Cleveland	W 108–97	Stephen Curry (38)	Draymond Green (12)	Andre Iguodala (7)	Quicken Loans Arena; 20,562	3–1
5	June 13	Cleveland	L 97–112	Klay Thompson (37)	Andre Iguodala (11)	Andre Iguodala (6)	Oracle Arena; 19,596	3–2
6	June 16	@ Cleveland	L 101–115	Stephen Curry (30)	Draymond Green (10)	Draymond Green (6)	Quicken Loans Arena; 20,562	3–3
7	June 19	Cleveland	L 89–93	Draymond Green (32)	Draymond Green (15)	Draymond Green (9)	Oracle Arena; 19,596	3–4

2016 playoff schedule

== Player statistics ==
Legend
GP	Games played	GS	Games started	MPG	Minutes per game
FG%	Field-goal percentage	3P%	3-point field-goal percentage	FT%	Free-throw percentage
RPG	Rebounds per game	APG	Assists per game	SPG	Steals per game
BPG	Blocks per game	PPG	Points per game

=== Regular season ===
Player	GP	GS	MPG	FG%	3P%	FT%	RPG	APG	SPG	BPG	PPG
Stephen Curry	79	79	34.2	50.4	45.4	90.8	5.4	6.7	2.1	0.2	30.1
Klay Thompson	80	80	33.3	47.0	42.5	87.3	3.8	2.1	0.8	0.6	22.1
Draymond Green	81	81	34.7	49.0	38.8	69.6	9.5	7.4	1.5	1.4	14.0
Harrison Barnes	66	59	30.9	46.6	38.3	76.1	4.9	1.8	0.6	0.2	11.7
Marreese Speights	72	0	11.6	43.2	38.7	82.5	3.3	0.8	0.3	0.5	7.1
Andre Iguodala	65	1	26.6	47.8	35.1	61.4	4.0	3.4	1.1	0.3	7.0
Festus Ezeli	46	13	16.7	54.8	–	53.0	5.6	0.7	0.4	1.1	7.0
Leandro Barbosa	68	0	15.9	46.2	35.5	83.9	1.7	1.2	0.6	0.1	6.4
Shaun Livingston	78	3	19.5	53.6	16.7	86.0	2.2	3.0	0.7	0.3	6.3
Andrew Bogut	70	66	20.7	62.7	100.0	48.0	7.0	2.3	0.5	1.6	5.4
Brandon Rush	72	25	14.7	42.7	41.4	64.3	2.5	0.8	0.3	0.3	4.2
Ian Clark	66	1	8.8	44.1	35.7	82.4	1.0	1.0	0.3	0.2	3.6
James Michael McAdoo	41	1	6.4	53.6	50.0	53.1	1.4	0.4	0.2	0.2	2.9
Kevon Looney	5	0	4.2	57.1	50.0	–	2.0	0.0	0.0	0.0	1.8
Anderson Varejão ^{≠}	22	0	8.5	43.8	–	55.2	2.3	0.7	0.2	0.2	2.6
Jason Thompson ^{‡}	28	1	6.4	47.6	–	62.5	1.9	0.7	0.1	0.3	2.1

After all games.
^{‡} Waived during the season
^{†} Traded during the season
^{≠} Acquired during the season

=== Playoffs ===
Player	GP	GS	MPG	FG%	3P%	FT%	RPG	APG	SPG	BPG	PPG
Stephen Curry	18	17	34.1	43.8	40.4	91.6	5.5	5.2	1.4	0.3	25.1
Klay Thompson	24	24	35.4	44.4	42.4	85.4	3.7	2.3	1.1	0.4	24.3
Draymond Green	23	23	38.2	43.1	36.5	73.8	9.9	6.0	1.6	1.8	15.4
Harrison Barnes	24	23	31.0	38.5	34.2	76.5	4.7	1.3	0.7	0.2	9.0
Andre Iguodala	24	3	32.0	47.6	38.5	56.1	4.4	3.8	1.2	0.4	8.9
Shaun Livingston	24	7	21.4	48.8	0.0	86.5	3.2	3.3	0.5	0.2	8.2
Marreese Speights	24	0	8.4	39.0	41.9	77.4	2.0	0.5	0.1	0.3	5.6
Leandro Barbosa	23	0	11.0	58.0	39.3	76.2	1.2	0.7	0.5	0.0	5.6
Andrew Bogut	22	22	16.6	62.3	0.0	35.7	5.7	1.4	0.6	1.6	4.6
Ian Clark	16	0	9.6	49.1	33.3	80.0	1.1	1.0	0.5	0.0	4.1
Festus Ezeli	23	1	8.8	53.6	–	43.2	2.7	0.3	0.0	0.3	4.0
Brandon Rush	14	0	7.9	45.0	33.3	50.0	1.6	0.2	0.1	0.1	1.6
Anderson Varejão	17	0	5.5	35.7	–	52.6	1.2	0.8	0.1	0.1	1.2
James Michael McAdoo	8	0	4.8	50.0	–	25.0	1.0	0.3	0.4	0.3	0.6

== Roster ==
2015–16 Golden State Warriors roster
Players

Pos.	No.	Player	Height	Weight	DOB	From
G	19	Leandro Barbosa	6 ft 3 in (1.91 m)	194 lb (88 kg)	1982–11–28	Brazil
F	40	Harrison Barnes	6 ft 8 in (2.03 m)	225 lb (102 kg)	1992–05–30	North Carolina
C	12	Andrew Bogut	7 ft 0 in (2.13 m)	260 lb (118 kg)	1984–11–28	Utah
G	21	Ian Clark	6 ft 3 in (1.91 m)	175 lb (79 kg)	1991–03–07	Belmont
G	30	Stephen Curry	6 ft 3 in (1.91 m)	190 lb (86 kg)	1988–03–14	Davidson
C	31	Festus Ezeli	6 ft 11 in (2.11 m)	265 lb (120 kg)	1989–10–21	Vanderbilt
F	23	Draymond Green	6 ft 7 in (2.01 m)	230 lb (104 kg)	1990–03–04	Michigan State
G/F	9	Andre Iguodala	6 ft 6 in (1.98 m)	215 lb (98 kg)	1984–01–28	Arizona
G	34	Shaun Livingston	6 ft 7 in (2.01 m)	192 lb (87 kg)	1985–09–11	Peoria Central HS (IL)
F	36	Kevon Looney	6 ft 9 in (2.06 m)	220 lb (100 kg)	1996–02–06	UCLA
F	20	James Michael McAdoo	6 ft 9 in (2.06 m)	240 lb (109 kg)	1993–01–04	North Carolina
G/F	4	Brandon Rush	6 ft 6 in (1.98 m)	220 lb (100 kg)	1985–07–07	Kansas
F/C	5	Marreese Speights	6 ft 10 in (2.08 m)	255 lb (116 kg)	1987–08–04	Florida
G	11	Klay Thompson	6 ft 7 in (2.01 m)	215 lb (98 kg)	1990–02–08	Washington State
F/C	18	Anderson Varejão	6 ft 11 in (2.11 m)	273 lb (124 kg)	1982–09–28	Brazil

Coaches
Head coach
- Steve Kerr
Assistant(s)
- Ron Adams
- Jarron Collins
- Luke Walton
- Bruce Fraser (player development)

Legend
- (DP) Unsigned draft pick
- (FA) Free agent
- (S) Suspended
- (DL) On assignment to D-League affiliate
- Injured

Roster
Updated: 2016–06–14

== Transactions ==
=== Trades ===
July 27, 2015	To Golden State Warriors • (United States) Gerald Wallace • (United States) Chris Babb	To Boston Celtics • (United States) David Lee
July 31, 2015	To Golden State Warriors • (United States) Jason Thompson	To Philadelphia 76ers • (United States) Gerald Wallace • Cash and draft consideration

=== Free agency ===
==== Additions ====
Player	Signed	Former team
(United States) Ian Clark	1-year contract	Denver Nuggets
(Brazil) Anderson Varejão	1-year contract	Portland Trail Blazers (never officially played for Portland and was waived on February 18)

==== Subtractions ====
Player	Reason left	New team
(United States) Justin Holiday	2-year contract worth $1.9 million	Atlanta Hawks
(Serbia) Ognjen Kuzmić	—	Panathinaikos (Greece)
(United States) Jason Thompson	Waived	Toronto Raptors

== Awards ==
Recipient	Award	Date awarded	Ref.
(United States) Stephen Curry	Western Conference Player of the Week	November 2, 2015	
(United States) Stephen Curry	Western Conference Player of the Week	November 23, 2015	
(United States) Luke Walton	Western Conference Coach of the Month (October/November)	December 1, 2015	
(United States) Stephen Curry	Western Conference Player of the Month (October/November)	December 3, 2015	
(United States) Stephen Curry	Western Conference Player of the Week	December 7, 2015	
(United States) Draymond Green	Western Conference Player of the Week	January 4, 2016	
(United States) Stephen Curry	Western Conference Player of the Week	February 29, 2016	
(United States) Stephen Curry	Western Conference Player of the Month (February)	March 3, 2016	
(United States) Stephen Curry	Western Conference Player of the Week	March 14, 2016	
(United States) Klay Thompson	Western Conference Player of the Week	March 28, 2016	
(United States) Steve Kerr	Western Conference Coach of the Month (March)	April 1, 2016	
(United States) Steve Kerr	Coach of the Year	April 26, 2016	
(United States) Stephen Curry	Most Valuable Player	May 10, 2016	
