= Enforcer (ice hockey) =

Ice hockey player known for their physicality and intimidating presence

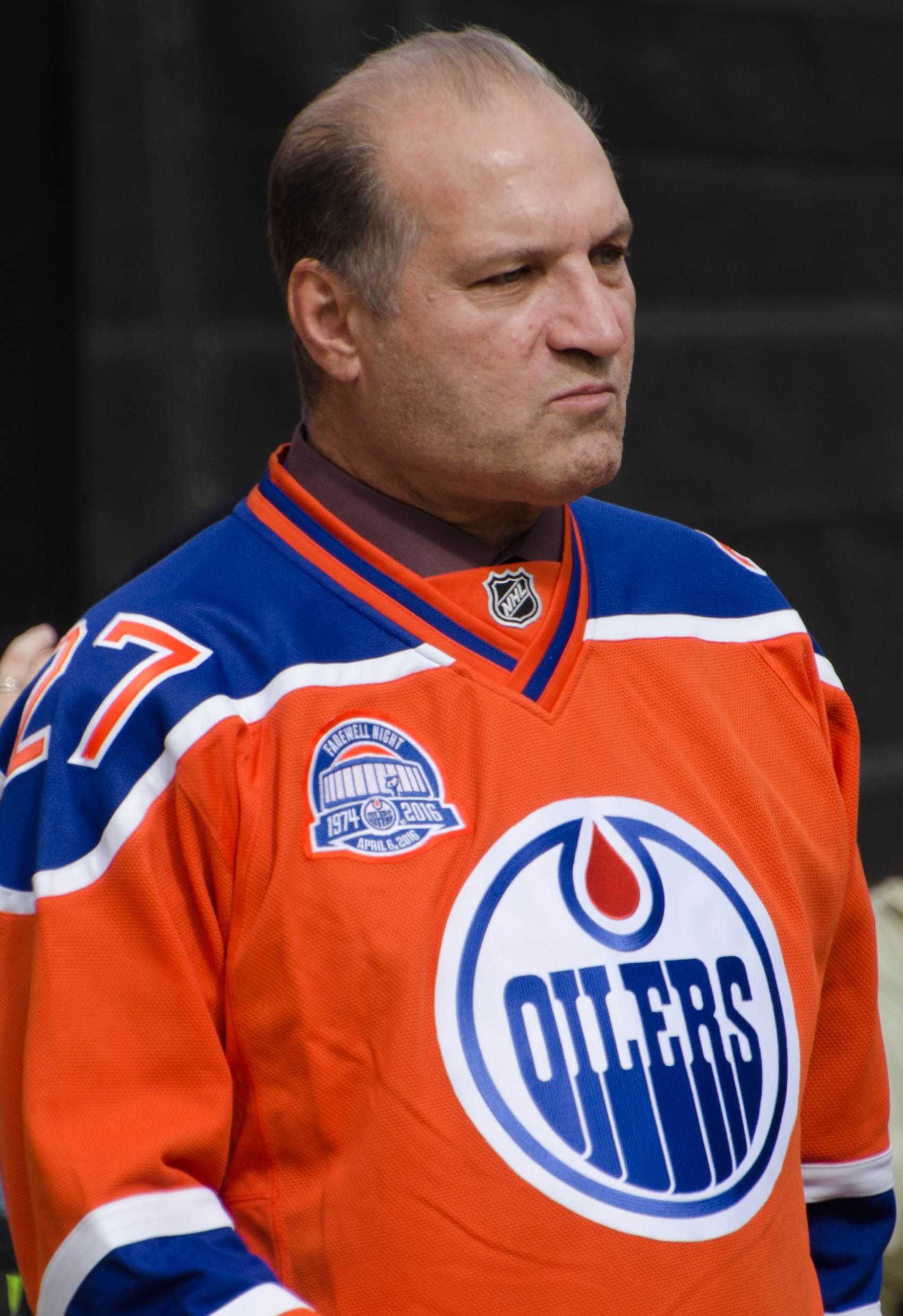
Dave Semenko (pictured 2016) won two Stanley Cups as an enforcer in the 1980s.

Enforcer is a role in ice hockey, although the term has since become well known in other sports. The term is sometimes used synonymously with "fighter", "tough guy", or "goon". An enforcer's job is to deter and respond to dirty or violent play by the opposing team. In ice hockey, when such play occurs, the enforcer is expected to respond aggressively by fighting or checking the offender. Enforcers are expected to react particularly harshly to violence against star players or goalies.

Enforcers are different from pests, players who seek to agitate opponents and distract them from the game without necessarily fighting them. The pest's primary role is to draw penalties from opposing players, thus "getting them off their game", while not actually intending to fight the opposition player (although exceptions to this do occur). Pests and enforcers often play together on the same line, usually the fourth line. Another related role is the grinder, known for hard work and checking rather than scoring, but not necessarily for fighting.

== National Hockey League ==
Enforcers can play either forward or defense, although they are most frequently used as wingers on the fourth forward checking line. Prized for their aggression, size, checking ability, and fists, enforcers are typically less gifted at skill areas of the game than their teammates. Enforcers are typically among the lowest scoring players on the team and receive a smaller share of ice time. They are also not highly paid compared to other players, and tend to move from team to team.

Enforcers are nevertheless often popular on their teams. John Branch wrote in The New York Times: "The enforcer, sometimes mocked as a goon or euphemized as a tough guy, may be hockey's favorite archetype. Enforcers are seen as working-class superheroes—understated types with an alter ego willing to do the sport's most dangerous work to protect others. And they are underdogs, men who otherwise might have no business in the game."

John Scott's reputation as an enforcer and fan favorite helped him earn enough fan votes to secure a spot in the 61st National Hockey League All-Star Game, despite having been demoted out of the league at the time of his election. He unexpectedly played a key role in his division's victory by scoring two goals, where fan response also led to him being named the most valuable player of the tournament. Fighting skills can allow insufficiently talented or smaller players to play in leagues where their hockey skills alone would not have otherwise granted them admission.

Enforcers sometimes take boxing lessons to improve their fighting. Some players combine aspects of the enforcer role with strong play in other areas of the game. Tiger Williams, Bob Probert, Chris Simon, and Tom Wilson are examples of enforcers who showed an occasional scoring flair, with Williams and Probert playing in the midseason All-Star Game. Terry O'Reilly once scored 90 points in a season, being the first player to finish in the top ten regular season scorers while amassing at least 200 penalty minutes, and later became captain of the Boston Bruins.

Sometimes enforcers can do their job by virtue of their reputation. Clark Gillies was among the best fighters in the NHL during his prime, but over time he rarely had to fight because opponents respected and feared him enough that they would not go after his teammates. Some skilled players, such as NHL legend Gordie Howe and NHL all-star Jarome Iginla, were also capable fighters, each functioning effectively as his own enforcer. A "Gordie Howe hat trick" is a player scoring a goal, assisting on a goal, and being involved in a fight during a single game.

=== Changing role ===
In the 1970s, the Boston Bruins and Philadelphia Flyers were known respectively as the "Big Bad Bruins" and "Broad Street Bullies", for stocking up on grinders and enforcers.

The role of the enforcer has diminished since rule enforcement changed following the 2004–05 NHL lockout to increase game speed and scoring. Although enforcers aren't highly paid nor take much ice time, teams are less inclined to keep a roster spot available for a one-dimensional fighter who is a liability as a scorer and defender, due to the decrease in fighting. This has led to a decrease in the number of players whose predominant role is enforcer.

Instead, more well-rounded players are expected to contribute aspects of the enforcer role. Intimidation and fighting continue to be utilized as a strategy in the NHL. In the 2007–08 NHL season fights occurred in 38.46% of the games, up from 33% the season before, which was just below the pre-lockout fighting level of 41.14% of games in the 2003–04 season. The frequency has steadily declined over time, from 1.3 fights per game in the late 1980s to 0.5 in 2012. Major penalties for fighting declined by 25% annually in the first half of the 2011–2012 season.

=== Summer 2011 enforcer deaths ===
Another possible reason for the decline in fighting and the use of the enforcer role is greater awareness of the risks from head trauma and resulting chronic traumatic encephalopathy (CTE) and the mood alteration that is associated with the condition. During the summer of 2011, three NHL enforcers died. Derek Boogaard died at the age of 28 from an accidental mixture of painkillers and alcohol. Rick Rypien died at the age of 27 from what was later confirmed as a suicide. Wade Belak was found dead at the age of 35 in his Toronto hotel room in circumstances that caused a newspaper's police source to categorize his death as a suicide. A year earlier in July 2010, Bob Probert died of an apparent heart attack in his mid-40s. Later tests indicated brain damage and CTE from his years of fighting.

Retired enforcer Georges Laraque has suggested that the National Hockey League Players' Association provide counselling to enforcers. Sports journalist and writer Roy MacGregor opines that in light of recent tragic events there should be more done about it, including eliminating the role altogether. New York Times sportswriter John Branch covered Boogaard's death and the "epidemic" of chronic traumatic encephalopathy that has come as a result of frequent head trauma sustained by hockey enforcers.

== In American football ==
In American football, particularly in the National Football League (NFL), the enforcer role is usually filled by defensive players such as linebackers or safeties. Their primary function is to intimidate opposing offensive players—especially receivers running routes across the middle of the field—through hard, legal hits that make them hesitant to catch passes.

Historic examples of NFL enforcers include Jack Tatum of the Oakland Raiders, whose vicious hits earned him the nickname "The Assassin", and Dick Butkus of the Chicago Bears. In more recent decades, players like Steve Atwater and Kam Chancellor of the Seattle Seahawks' "Legion of Boom" secondary served as the quintessential modern enforcers. However, due to increased player safety initiatives and strict penalties against "targeting" and hits to the head, the traditional enforcer role has been heavily regulated and minimized in the modern game.

== In association football ==
In association football (soccer), an enforcer is typically a defensive midfielder (often referred to as a "destroyer" or "hard man") whose role is to disrupt the opposition's attacking play, win back possession through aggressive tackling, and protect the team's more creative, attacking players. Enforcers are known for their stamina, physical strength, and uncompromising nature, often accruing a high number of yellow and red cards.

Notable football enforcers include Roy Keane, who famously captained Manchester United and asserted midfield dominance through fierce tackling and intimidation; Gennaro Gattuso of AC Milan; and Vinnie Jones, a central figure of the Wimbledon F.C. "Crazy Gang" in the 1980s and 1990s.

== In Australian rules football ==
In Australian rules football, the term "enforcer" (also frequently referred to as a "hard man") describes a player whose physical aggression and intimidation tactics are utilized to protect their team's smaller, more skillful players. Before the introduction of modern tribunals and stricter high-contact regulations, the sport routinely allowed for "square-ups" (retaliation tactics), meaning that diminutive but highly skilled ball-winners heavily relied on the protection of a designated enforcer to ensure they weren't bullied or targeted by the opposition.

While the Australian Football League (AFL) strictly prohibits striking, fighting, and melees, enforcers legally asserted their dominance through fierce tackling, sheer physical presence, and the "bump" (a severe hip-and-shoulder collision). Unlike ice hockey enforcers who are generally bottom-tier players in terms of technical ability, AFL enforcers can also be among the most highly skilled and heavily decorated players on the field.

Notable historic enforcers include Carl Ditterich, an athletic but volatile ruckman who was reported 19 times and suspended 17 times during the 1960s and 1970s, and Essendon's Ron Andrews, a notoriously tough backman who used his straight-line speed to run directly through opposing players. In more recent eras, players such as Byron Pickett—famous for his hard, tree-trunk-like bumps—served as the ultimate physical deterrents for their respective clubs.

One of the most famous examples of the enforcer role occurred during the brutally physical 1989 VFL Grand Final between the Hawthorn Hawks and the Geelong Cats. Seeking to set a physical tone and retaliate against Hawthorn's aggressive style from earlier in the season, Geelong enforcer Mark Yeates charged through the opening center bounce to deliver a devastating bump on Hawthorn's star forward and noted tough-guy, Dermott Brereton. Brereton suffered broken ribs and a ruptured kidney, but famously played out the match, which Hawthorn ultimately won. Since there is no red card in professional Australian rules football, a player may sacrifice a short-term penalty (such as a 50-metre penalty) to eliminate a dangerous or highly skilled opponent; in a grand final, this is particularly problematic, since a suspension is of little consequence if the penalty is to be served at the start of the next season (or not at all in the case of a player about to retire).

Similar to the NHL, the role of a pure, dedicated enforcer has heavily diminished in the modern AFL in the 21st century. Stricter interpretations of high contact, the introduction of the Match Review Officer (MRO) to automatically penalise off-the-ball incidents, and a stronger emphasis on concussion protocols have largely phased out the traditional "hard man". Nevertheless, instead of relying on a singular enforcer, modern AFL teams usually adopt a collective team approach to physical pressure and intimidation; this has the added benefit of distributing the guilt.

== In baseball ==
While not a contact sport, baseball has a long history of pitchers acting as enforcers to police the sport's "unwritten rules." If an opposing batter violates etiquette (such as excessively celebrating a home run) or if an opposing pitcher hits a teammate, the enforcer will often retaliate by throwing a beanball or a brushback pitch at the opposing team's hitters. Hall of Fame pitchers like Bob Gibson, Don Drysdale, and Nolan Ryan were highly regarded for their willingness to enforce the plate and protect their teammates through intimidation.

== In basketball ==
Enforcers are also recognized as existing in basketball albeit more informally and with more restraint due to the stronger regulations on physical contact. As fighting is prohibited, enforcers will usually commit intentional fouls against offending players and it is common for enforcers to be ejected from games. An example of this type of player is Draymond Green, who is recognized as the enforcer who protects Stephen Curry and is the second-most ejected player in NBA history. Sophie Cunningham gained recognition as an enforcer after being ejected for tackling Jacy Sheldon in retribution for poking Cunningham's teammate Caitlin Clark in the eye earlier in the game. Sales of Cunningham's jersey increased dramatically and she gained hundreds of thousands of new followers on her social media accounts in the immediate aftermath of the incident. Dennis Rodman, Charles Oakley, Kevin Garnett, Karl Malone, Charles Barkley, Shaquille O'Neal and Maurice Lucas have also been described as enforcers.

== In rugby ==
Both rugby union and rugby league feature enforcers, typically found among the "forwards". A rugby enforcer's job is to establish physical dominance over the opposition forward pack in scrums, rucks, and tackles, thereby creating space and psychological advantages for their teammates.

In rugby union, South African lock Bakkies Botha was famously nicknamed "The Enforcer" for his bruising, highly physical style of play that helped the Springboks win the 2007 Rugby World Cup. In rugby league, players like Adrian Morley and Les Boyd were renowned for their aggressive defense and high-impact hit-ups.

== In popular culture ==
Warren Zevon's 2002 album My Ride's Here includes a tragicomic track titled 'Hit Somebody! (The Hockey Song)'. The song tells the life story of a young enforcer, who, despite having little skill at the sport, rises over the years to become 'the king of the goons' before being fatally concussed while scoring the one goal of his career.

== See also ==
- List of NHL enforcers
- Violence in ice hockey — about violent acts that are prohibited by all ice hockey leagues
