= NBA Hustle Award =

Annual basketball award

- Sport: Basketball
- League: National Basketball Association
- Awarded for: NBA player that makes the most effort and hustle plays that impact winning

History
- First award: 2016–17
- Most recent: Moussa Diabaté; Charlotte Hornets

The Hustle Award is an annual National Basketball Association (NBA) award given since 2017 to players that "best utilize hustle to help their teams win on a nightly basis." The award is decided using a metric known as "hustle stats," which tracks defensive and offensive efforts such as diving for loose balls, taking charges, deflections, setting screens, and contesting shots.

Patrick Beverley was the inaugural winner of the award. The only multi-time winner is Marcus Smart, who has won the award three times.

== Winners ==
^	Denotes player who is still active in the NBA
Player (#)	Denotes the number of times the player has received the award

Season	Player	Position	Nationality	Team	Ref
2016–17	Patrick Beverley	Guard	United States	Houston Rockets	
2017–18	Amir Johnson	Center	United States	Philadelphia 76ers	
2018–19	Marcus Smart^	Guard	United States	Boston Celtics	
2019–20	Montrezl Harrell	Center	United States	Los Angeles Clippers	
2020–21	Thaddeus Young	Forward	United States	Chicago Bulls	
2021–22	Marcus Smart^ (2)	Guard	United States	Boston Celtics (2)	
2022–23	Marcus Smart^ (3)	Guard	United States	Boston Celtics (3)	
2023–24	Alex Caruso^	Guard	United States	Chicago Bulls (2)	
2024–25	Draymond Green^	Forward	United States	Golden State Warriors	
2025–26	Moussa Diabaté^	Center	France	Charlotte Hornets	

== Multi-time winners ==
Awards	Player	Team(s)	Years
3	(United States) Marcus Smart	Boston Celtics	2019, 2022, 2023

== Teams ==
Awards	Teams	Years
3	Boston Celtics	2019, 2022, 2023
2	Chicago Bulls	2021, 2024
1	Houston Rockets	2017
1	Philadelphia 76ers	2018
1	Los Angeles Clippers	2020
1	Golden State Warriors	2025
1	Charlotte Hornets	2026

== See also ==
- NBA records
