= List of NHL enforcers =

This is a list of enforcers who have played in the National Hockey League.

== Currently active players ==
The following are currently active NHL ice hockey enforcers and current minor league enforcers with NHL experience, listed alphabetically by their last name.

Player	Nationality	Current league	Current team	Nickname	Height	Weight	Reference
Andy Andreoff	(Canada)	KHL	Unrestricted Free Agent	The Big Dog	6 ft 1 in (1.85 m)	203 lb (92 kg)	
Tyrel Bauer	(Canada)	NHL	Winnipeg Jets	Bausy	6 ft 3 in (1.90 m)	207 lb (94 kg)	
Sam Carrick	(Canada)	NHL	Buffalo Sabres	Syrup Sam	6 ft 0 in (1.83 m)	202 lb (91 kg)	
Nicolas Deslauriers	(Canada)	NHL	Carolina Hurricanes	D-Lo, Des	6 ft 1 in (1.85 m)	215 lb (98 kg)	
Brenden Dillon	(Canada)	NHL	New Jersey Devils	Dilly	6 ft 4 in (1.93 m)	225 lb (102 kg)	
Max Domi	(Canada)	NHL	Toronto Maple Leafs	Doms, Mad Max, Shootsy	5 ft 10 in (1.78 m)	208 lb (94 kg)	
Curtis Douglas	(Canada)	NHL	Seattle Kraken	42 Doug	6 ft 9 in (2.06 m)	242 lb (109 kg)	
Jonah Gadjovich	(Canada)	NHL	Florida Panthers	Man Child	6 ft 2 in (1.88 m)	209 lb (96 kg)	
Mason Geertsen	(Canada)	AHL	Rochester Americans	Geertsy	6 ft 4 in (1.93 m)	227 lb (103 kg)	
AJ Greer	(Canada)	NHL	Anaheim Ducks	Cheese, Shin Bone	6 ft 3 in (1.90 m)	224 lb (101 kg)	
Radko Gudas	(Czech Republic)	NHL	Florida Panthers	Gudie, The Butcher	6 ft 0 in (1.83 m)	208 lb (94 kg)	
Bokondji Imama	(Canada)	NHL	Florida Panthers	Boko	6 ft 1 in (1.85 m)	223 lb (101 kg)	
Tanner Jeannot	(Canada)	NHL	Boston Bruins	Jeaner, Jeano, The Ox	6 ft 2 in (1.88 m)	208 lb (94 kg)	
Ross Johnston	(Canada)	NHL	St. Louis Blues	Ross the Boss	6 ft 5 in (1.96 m)	236 lb (107 kg)	
Evander Kane	(Canada)	KHL	HC Sibir Novosibirsk	EK9, Kaner	6 ft 2 in (1.88 m)	218 lb (98 kg)	
Mark Kastelic	(United States)	NHL	Boston Bruins	Kasty, Wrecking Ball	6 ft 4 in (1.93 m)	234 lb (106 kg)	
Adam Klapka	(Czech Republic)	NHL	Calgary Flames	Diesel Train, Goliath, Klapper	6 ft 8 in (2.03 m)	235 lb (106 kg)	
Keegan Kolesar	(Canada)	NHL	Detroit Red Wings	Koley	6 ft 2 in (1.88 m)	218 lb (98 kg)	
Joseph LaBate	(United States)	AHL	Unrestricted Free Agent	The Shop	6 ft 5 in (1.96 m)	225 lb (102 kg)	
Brendan Lemieux	(United States)	NL	HC Davos	Pepe	6 ft 1in (1.85 m)	209 lb (95 kg)	
Ryan Lomberg	(Canada)	NHL	Columbus Blue Jackets	Lomborghini	5 ft 9 in (1.75 m)	187 lb (85 kg)	
Kurtis MacDermid	(Canada)	NHL	Ottawa Senators	Dermy, Kermit	6 ft 5 in (1.96 m)	233 lb (106 kg)	
Zack MacEwen	(Canada)	NHL	Toronto Maple Leafs	Big Mac	6 ft 3 in (1.91 m)	208 lb (94 kg)	
Michael McCarron	(United States)	NHL	Minnesota Wild	Big Sexy, Big Show	6 ft 6 in (1.98 m)	231 lb (105 kg)	
Dylan McIlrath	(Canada)	NHL	Washington Capitals	The Undertaker	6 ft 5 in (1.96 m)	236 lb (107 kg)	
Darnell Nurse	(Canada)	NHL	San Jose Sharks	Doc, Nasty Nurse, Nursey	6 ft 4 in (1.93 m)	215 lb (97 kg)	
Liam O'Brien	(Canada)	NHL	Utah Mammoth	Big Tuna, Spicy Tuna, Tuna	6 ft 1 in (1.85 m)	205 lb (93 kg)	
Mathieu Olivier	(Canada)	NHL	Columbus Blue Jackets	Nature Boy, The Biloxi Bull	6 ft 2 in (1.88 m)	209 lb (95 kg)	
Michael Pezzetta	(Canada)	AHL	Toronto Marlies	Pezz	6 ft 1 in (1.85 m)	222 lb (100 kg)	
Matt Rempe	(Canada)	NHL	New York Rangers	Rempire State Building, Slender Man	6 ft 8.5 in (2.04 m)	240 lb (109 kg)	
Scott Sabourin	(Canada)	NHL	Tampa Bay Lightning	Sabby	6 ft 3 in (1.90 m)	205 lb (92 kg)	
Luke Schenn	(Canada)	NHL	Vancouver Canucks	Schenner, The Eraser	6 ft 2 in (1.88 m)	229 lb (104 kg)	
Givani Smith	(Canada)	KHL	Shanghai Dragons	Tank	6 ft 2 in (1.88 m)	220 lb (100 kg)	
Logan Stanley	(Canada)	NHL	New York Islanders	Stan	6 ft 7 in (2.01 m)	231 lb (104 kg)	
Tyler Tucker	(Canada)	NHL	St. Louis Blues	Tucks	6 ft 1 in (1.85 m)	204 lb (93 kg)	
Jeffrey Viel	(Canada)	NHL	Tampa Bay Lightning	Porkchop	6 ft 1 in (1.85 m)	214 lb (97 kg)	
Austin Watson	(United States)	AHL	Unrestricted Free Agent	The Toothless Wonder	6 ft 4 in (1.93 m)	204 lb (93 kg)	
Tom Wilson	(Canada)	NHL	Washington Capitals	Willy, Willy Baby, Whip, Ten Train	6 ft 4 in (1.93 m)	218 lb (99 kg)	
Luke Witkowski	(United States)	ELH	HC Kometa Brno	Wit, Witko	6 ft 2 in (1.88 m)	210 lb (95 kg)	
Arber Xhekaj	(Canada)	NHL	Montreal Canadiens	Sheriff, WiFi	6 ft 4 in (1.93 m)	240 lb (109 kg)	
Florian Xhekaj	(Canada)	NHL	Montreal Canadiens	The Deputy	6 ft 3 in (1.90 m)	195 lb (88 kg)	
Nikita Zadorov	(Russia)	NHL	Boston Bruins	Big Z	6 ft 7 in (2.01 m)	255 lb (115 kg)	

== Retired players ==
The following are retired NHL ice hockey enforcers, listed alphabetically by their last name.

Player	Nationality	Nickname	Height	Weight	Reference
Jim Agnew	(Canada)	The Sheriff	6 ft 1 in (1.85 m)	190 lb (86 kg)	
Jamie Allison	(Canada)	Alice	6 ft 1 in (1.85 m)	210 lb (95 kg)	
Perry Anderson	(Canada)	Wheels	6 ft 1 in (1.85 m)	225 lb (102 kg)	
Mel Angelstad	(Canada)	Mangler	6 ft 3 in (1.91 m)	209 lb (95 kg)	
Shawn Antoski	(Canada)	Moose	6 ft 4 in (1.93 m)	235 lb (107 kg)	
Arron Asham	(Canada)	Smash'Em	5 ft 11 in (1.80 m)	205 lb (92 kg)	
Darren Banks	(Canada)	The Banker	6 ft 2 in (1.88 m)	215 lb (97 kg)	
Krys Barch	(Canada)	Barchy	6 ft 2 in (1.88 m)	210 lb (95 kg)	
Matt Barnaby	(Canada)	Killer	6 ft 1 in (1.85 m)	191 lb (87 kg)	
Ryan Bast	(Canada)	Time Bomb	6 ft 2 in (1.88 m)	190 lb (86 kg)	
Frank Bathe	(Canada)	The Animal	6 ft 1 in (1.85 m)	185 lb (83 kg)	
Ken Baumgartner	(Canada)	Bomber	6 ft 1 in (1.85 m)	205 lb (93 kg)	
Robin Bawa	(Canada)	The Punjabi Prince	6 ft 2 in (1.88 m)	214 lb (97 kg)	
Paul Baxter	(Canada)	The Baby Bull	5 ft 11 in (1.80 m)	189 lb (86 kg)	
Barry Beck	(Canada)	Bubba	6 ft 3 in (1.91 m)	215 lb (98 kg)	
Wade Belak	(Canada)	The Intimidator	6 ft 5 in (1.96 m)	222 lb (101 kg)	
Francis Bélanger	(Canada)	Fran	6 ft 3 in (1.90 m)	228 lb (103 kg)	
Ken Belanger	(Canada)	The Beast	6 ft 4 in (1.93 m)	220 lb (100 kg)	
Éric Bertrand	(Canada)	Whitey	6 ft 1 in (1.85 m)	198 lb (89 kg)	
Craig Berube	(Canada)	Chief	6 ft 2 in (1.88 m)	220 lb (100 kg)	
Jeff Beukeboom	(Canada)	Boomer	6 ft 5 in (1.96 m)	230 lb (104 kg)	
Frank Bialowas	(Canada)	The Animal	5 ft 11 in (1.80 m)	220 lb (99 kg)	
Stu Bickel	(United States)	Bicks	6 ft 4 in (1.93 m)	207 lb (93 kg)	
Kevin Bieksa	(Canada)	Juice	6 ft 1 in (1.85 m)	197 lb (89 kg)	
Paul Bissonnette	(Canada)	Biznasty	6 ft 4 in (1.93 m)	220 lb (100 kg)	
Sylvain Blouin	(Canada)	The Bopper	6 ft 2 in (1.88 m)	222 lb (101 kg)	
Jared Boll	(United States)	Wrecking Ball	6 ft 3 in (1.90 m)	206 lb (93 kg)	
Dennis Bonvie	(Canada)	Dennis the Menace	5 ft 11 in (1.80 m)	205 lb (93 kg)	
Derek Boogaard	(Canada)	The Boogie Man	6 ft 7 in (2.01 m)	258 lb (117 kg)	
Patrick Bordeleau	(Canada)	Bordello of Blood	6 ft 6 in (1.98 m)	225 lb (102 kg)	
Mark Borowiecki	(Canada)	Boro Cop	6 ft 1 in (1.85 m)	216 lb (98 kg)	
Laurie Boschman	(Canada)	Bossman	6 ft 0 in (1.83 m)	185 lb (83 kg)	
Bob Boughner	(Canada)	The Boogieman	6 ft 0 in (1.83 m)	206 lb (93 kg)	
Jesse Boulerice	(United States)	The Bull	6 ft 2 in (1.88 m)	215 lb (98 kg)	
Charlie Bourgeois	(Canada)	Boo Boo	6 ft 4 in (1.93 m)	220 lb (99 kg)	
Eric Boulton	(Canada)	Bolts	6 ft 0 in (1.83 m)	225 lb (102 kg)	
Matt Bradley	(Canada)	Brads	6 ft 3 in (1.90 m)	201 lb (91 kg)	
Donald Brashear	(Canada)	The Don	6 ft 3 in (1.91 m)	240 lb (109 kg)	
Kip Brennan	(Canada)	The Kipster	6 ft 4 in (1.93 m)	222 lb (101 kg)	
Sheldon Brookbank	(Canada)	Buckaroo	6 ft 1 in (1.85 m)	202 lb (91 kg)	
Wade Brookbank	(Canada)	Brooksie	6 ft 4 in (1.93 m)	225 lb (102 kg)	
Brad Brown	(Canada)	Bruiser	6 ft 4 in (1.93 m)	220 lb (99 kg)	
Dave Brown	(Canada)	Brown Dog	6 ft 5 in (1.96 m)	225 lb (102 kg)	
Mike Brown	(United States)	Captain Price	5 ft 11 in (1.80 m)	205 lb (92 kg)	
Jeff Brubaker	(United States)	Bru	6 ft 2 in (1.88 m)	207 lb (93 kg)	
Kelly Buchberger	(Canada)	Bucky	6 ft 2 in (1.88 m)	210 lb (95 kg)	
Adam Burish	(United States)	Patient Zero	6 ft 1 in (1.85 m)	195 lb (88 kg)	
Garrett Burnett	(Canada)	Rocky	6 ft 3 in (1.91 m)	235 lb (107 kg)	
Rod Buskas	(Canada)	Buck	6 ft 1 in (1.85 m)	206 lb (93 kg)	
Garth Butcher	(Canada)	Strangler	6 ft 0 in (1.83 m)	204 lb (92 kg)	
Lyndon Byers	(Canada)	L.B.	6 ft 1 in (1.85 m)	190 lb (86 kg)	
Eric Cairns	(Canada)	Big Daddy	6 ft 6 in (1.98 m)	241 lb (109 kg)	
Daniel Carcillo	(Canada)	Car-Bomb	5 ft 11 in (1.80 m)	203 lb (92 kg)	
Matt Carkner	(Canada)	Big Matt	6 ft 4 in (1.93 m)	229 lb (103 kg)	
Terry Carkner	(Canada)	Carks	6 ft 3 in (1.91 m)	210 lb (95 kg)	
Kent Carlson	(United States)	Karlie	6 ft 3 in (1.91 m)	210 lb (95 kg)	
Jay Caufield	(United States)	The Bodyguard	6 ft 4 in (1.93 m)	237 lb (108 kg)	
Kelly Chase	(Canada)	Chaser	6 ft 0 in (1.83 m)	200 lb (91 kg)	
Denis Chassé	(Canada)	Sassy	6 ft 2 in (1.88 m)	200 lb (90 kg)	
Shane Churla	(Canada)	Chain Saw	6 ft 1 in (1.85 m)	200 lb (91 kg)	
Jeff Chychrun	(Canada)	Chych	6 ft 4 in (1.93 m)	185 lb (84 kg)	
Dean Chynoweth	(Canada)	Starbeast	6 ft 1 in (1.85 m)	191 lb (86 kg)	
Enrico Ciccone	(Canada)	Chico	6 ft 4 in (1.93 m)	200 lb (91 kg)	
Kim Clackson	(Canada)	Wrangler	5 ft 10 in (1.78 m)	195 lb (88 kg)	
Wendel Clark	(Canada)	Captain Crunch	5 ft 11 in (1.80 m)	194 lb (87 kg)	
David Clarkson	(Canada)	The Caged Warrior	6 ft 0 in (1.83 m)	207 lb (93 kg)	
Kyle Clifford	(Canada)	The Colonel	6 ft 2 in (1.88 m)	211 lb (96 kg)	
Ryane Clowe	(Canada)	Clowie	6 ft 3 in (1.90 m)	225 lb (102 kg)	
Richard Clune	(Canada)	Dicky	5 ft 11 in (1.80 m)	211 lb (95 kg)	
Glen Cochrane	(Canada)	Lurch	6 ft 2 in (1.88 m)	210 lb (95 kg)	
Tim Conboy	(United States)	The Big Convoy	6 ft 2 in (1.88 m)	225 lb (102 kg)	
Shayne Corson	(Canada)	Corky	6 ft 1 in (1.85 m)	202 lb (91 kg)	
Patrick Cote	(Canada)	K.O.	6 ft 3 in (1.91 m)	220 lb (100 kg)	
Riley Cote	(Canada)	Riles	6 ft 2 in (1.88 m)	220 lb (100 kg)	
Craig Coxe	(United States)	Cookie	6 ft 4 in (1.93 m)	220 lb (100 kg)	
John Craighead	(Canada)	Craiger	6 ft 0 in (1.83 m)	195 lb (88 kg)	
BJ Crombeen	(United States)	The Energizer Bunny	6 ft 2 in (1.88 m)	209 lb (94 kg)	
Shawn Cronin	(United States)	The Barbarian	6 ft 2 in (1.88 m)	210 lb (95 kg)	
Troy Crowder	(Canada)	The Crow	6 ft 4 in (1.93 m)	238 lb (108 kg)	
Phil Crowe	(Canada)	Crowie	6 ft 2 in (1.88 m)	220 lb (100 kg)	
Jim Cummins	(United States)	The Big Man	6 ft 2 in (1.88 m)	200 lb (91 kg)	
Brian Curran	(Canada)	The Colonel	6 ft 5 in (1.96 m)	215 lb (98 kg)	
Brad Dalgarno	(Canada)	Dolly	6 ft 3 in (1.91 m)	215 lb (98 kg)	
Ken Daneyko	(Canada)	Mr. Devil	6 ft 1 in (1.85 m)	215 lb (97 kg)	
Scott Daniels	(Canada)	Chief	6 ft 3 in (1.90 m)	215 lb (97 kg)	
Rob Davison	(Canada)	Davie	6 ft 2 in (1.88 m)	215 lb (97 kg)	
Adam Deadmarsh	(Canada)	Deadly	6 ft 0 in (1.83 m)	205 lb (92 kg)	
Louie DeBrusk	(Canada)	Lou	6 ft 1 in (1.85 m)	225 lb (102 kg)	
Guillaume Desbiens	(Canada)	Dezzy	6 ft 3 in (1.90 m)	216 lb (97 kg)	
André Deveaux	(The Bahamas)	Devo	6 ft 3 in (1.90 m)	220 lb (99 kg)	
Gerald Diduck	(Canada)	D.I.	6 ft 1 in (1.85 m)	216 lb (97 kg)	
Chris Dingman	(Canada)	Dinger	6 ft 3 in (1.91 m)	243 lb (110 kg)	
Robert Dirk	(Canada)	The Big Dirk	6 ft 4 in (1.93 m)	210 lb (95 kg)	
Jason Doig	(Canada)	Doiger	6 ft 3 in (1.90 m)	230 lb (104 kg)	
Tie Domi	(Canada)	The Albanian Aggressor	5 ft 10 in (1.73 m)	213 lb (97 kg)	
Gord Donnelly	(Canada)	The Gorilla	6 ft 1 in (1.85 m)	202 lb (92 kg)	
Daniel Doré	(Canada)	Dorzy	6 ft 3 in (1.90 m)	202 lb (91 kg)	
Derek Dorsett	(Canada)	Tazmanian Devil	6 ft 0 in (1.83 m)	192 lb (87 kg)	
Doug Doull	(Canada)	Duller	6 ft 2 in (1.88 m)	216 lb (97 kg)	
Aaron Downey	(Canada)	Diesel	6 ft 0 in (1.83 m)	216 lb (98 kg)	
Steve Durbano	(Canada)	Mental Case	6 ft 1 in (1.85 m)	210 lb (95 kg)	
Gordie Dwyer	(Canada)	Gord	6 ft 3 in (1.90 m)	215 lb (97 kg)	
Ben Eager	(Canada)	Eags	6 ft 2 in (1.88 m)	240 lb (108 kg)	
Deryk Engelland	(Canada)	Eggo	6 ft 2 in (1.88 m)	212 lb (96 kg)	
John Erskine	(Canada)	Heavy	6 ft 4 in (1.93 m)	220 lb (99 kg)	
Kevin Evans	(Canada)	The Killer	5 ft10 in (1.78 m)	182 lb (83 kg)	
Todd Ewen	(Canada)	The Animal	6 ft 3 in (1.91 m)	230 lb (100 kg)	
Garnet Exelby	(Canada)	Ex	6 ft 1 in (1.85 m)	215 lb (97 kg)	
Glen Featherstone	(Canada)	Feather	6 ft 4 in (1.93 m)	209 lb (94 kg)	
Todd Fedoruk	(Canada)	Fridge	6 ft 2 in (1.88 m)	232 lb (105 kg)	
John Ferguson	(Canada)	Fergy	6 ft 0 in (1.83 m)	178 lb (81 kg)	
Micheal Ferland	(Canada)	Ferly	6 ft 1 in (1.85 m)	217 lb (98 kg)	
Joe Finley	(United States)	The Red #3	6 ft 8 in (2.03 m)	249 lb (112 kg)	
Steven Finn	(Canada)	The Finnisher	6 ft 0 in (1.83 m)	191 lb (86 kg)	
Gerry Fleming	(Canada)	Flemmer	6 ft 5 in (1.96 m)	240 lb (110 kg)	
Reg Fleming	(Canada)	Reggie, The Ruffian	5 ft 10 in (1.78 m)	190 lb (86 kg)	
Ryan Flinn	(Canada)	Rhino	6 ft 5 in (1.96 m)	248 lb (112 kg)	
Rick Foley	(Canada)	The Huge One	6 ft 4 in (1.93 m)	223 lb (101 kg)	
Mike Foligno	(Canada)	Leapin' Mike Foligno	6 ft 2 in (1.88 m)	195 lb (88 kg)	
Lou Fontinato	(Canada)	Leapin' Louie	6 ft 1 in (1.85 m)	185 lb (84 kg)	
Nick Fotiu	(United States)	Pie Face	6 ft 2 in (1.88 m)	210 lb (95 kg)	
Curt Fraser	(United States)	Frazz	6 ft 0 in (1.83 m)	200 lb (91 kg)	
Kyle Freadrich	(Canada)	Bushy	6 ft 7 in (2.01 m)	260 lb (117 kg)	
Ron Friest	(Canada)	Friesty	5 ft 11 in (1.80 m)	185 lb (83 kg)	
Mitch Fritz	(Canada)	Fritzy	6 ft 8 in (2.03 m)	258 lb (117 kg)	
Kurtis Gabriel	(Canada)	Sunshine	6 ft 4 in (1.93 m)	200 lb (91 kg)	
Link Gaetz	(Canada)	The Missing Link	6 ft 3 in (191 cm)	240 lb (110 kg)	
Gerard Gallant	(Canada)	Spud	5 ft 10 in (1.78 m)	190 lb (86 kg)	
Bob Gassoff	(Canada)	Gasser	5 ft 10 in (1.78 m)	190 lb (86 kg)	
Paul Gaustad	(United States)	Goose	6 ft 5 in (1.96 m)	227 lb (102 kg)	
Luke Gazdic	(Canada)	Gazzy	6 ft 4 in (1.93 m)	225 lb (102 kg)	
Clark Gillies	(Canada)	Jethro	6 ft 3 in (1.91 m)	210 lb (95 kg)	
Trevor Gillies	(Canada)	The Gorilla	6 ft 3 in (1.90 m)	231 lb (104 kg)	
Tanner Glass	(Canada)	Tag	6 ft 1 in (1.85 m)	210 lb (95 kg)	
Tim Gleason	(United States)	Glease	6 ft 0 in (1.83 m)	217 lb (98 kg)	
Eric Godard	(Canada)	The Hand of God	6 ft 4 in (1.93 m)	227 lb (103 kg)	
Triston Grant	(Canada)	T-Bird	6 ft 1 in (1.85 m)	212 lb (96 kg)	
Chris Gratton	(Canada)	Gratts	6 ft 4 in (1.93 m)	226 lb (102 kg)	
Josh Gratton	(Canada)	Chin Of Steel	6 ft 2 in (1.88 m)	214 lb (97 kg)	
Stu Grimson	(Canada)	The Grim Reaper	6 ft 6 in (1.98 m)	240 lb (109 kg)	
Micheal Haley	(Canada)	Hales	5 ft 11 in (1.80 m)	205 lb (92 kg)	
Bob Halkidis	(Canada)	Hawk	5 ft 11 in (1.80 m)	205 lb (92 kg)	
Trevor Halverson	(Canada)	The Ice Man	6 ft 0 in (1.83 m)	200 lb (90 kg)	
Jay Harrison	(Canada)	Haredawg	6 ft 4 in (1.93 m)	220 lb (99 kg)	
Mike Hartman	(United States)	Harty	6 ft 1 in (1.85 m)	190 lb (86 kg)	
Derian Hatcher	(United States)	Quiet Outlaw	6 ft 5 in (1.96 m)	235 lb (106 kg)	
Sami Helenius	(Finland)	The Fighting Finn	6 ft 6 in (1.98 m)	230 lb (100 kg)	
Archie Henderson	(Canada)	The Big Oaf	6 ft 6 in (1.98 m)	220 lb (100 kg)	
Matt Hendricks	(United States)	Wagon	6 ft 0 in (1.83 m)	209 lb (95 kg)	
Matt Hervey	(United States)	Herv	5 ft 11 in (1.80 m)	205 lb (92 kg)	
Paul Higgins	(Canada)	The Terminator	6 ft 1 in (1.85 m)	195 lb (88 kg)	
Ryan Hollweg	(United States)	Freight Train	5 ft 10 in (1.78 m)	212 lb (96 kg)	
Paul Holmgren	(United States)	Bam Bam	6 ft 3 in (1.90 m)	210 lb (95 kg)	
Randy Holt	(Canada)	Wrangler	5 ft 11 in (1.80 m)	185 lb (84 kg)	
Tony Horacek	(Canada)	The Horacek Express	6 ft 4 in (1.93 m)	215 lb (98 kg)	
Darcy Hordichuk	(Canada)	Hordi the Horrible	6 ft 1 in (1.85 m)	215 lb (98 kg)	
Ed Hospodar	(United States)	Boxcar	6 ft 2 in (1.88 m)	210 lb (95 kg)	
Doug Houda	(Canada)	Hoody	6 ft 2 in (1.88 m)	208 lb (94 kg)	
Garry Howatt	(Canada)	Toy Tiger	5 ft 9 in (1.75 m)	170 lb (85 kg)	
Bill Huard	(Canada)	Baby-face	6 ft 1 in (1.85 m)	215 lb (98 kg)	
Brent Hughes	(Canada)	Huggy	5 ft 11 in (1.80 m)	195 lb (88 kg)	
Cale Hulse	(Canada)	Hulsie	6 ft 3 in (1.90 m)	220 lb (99 kg)	
Dale Hunter	(Canada)	Huntsy	5 ft 10 in (1.78 m)	200 lb (91 kg)	
Tim Hunter	(Canada)	Sharky	6 ft 2 in (1.88 m)	202 lb (92 kg)	
Jamie Huscroft	(Canada)	Husky	6 ft 2 in (1.88 m)	200 lb (91 kg)	
Dave Hutchison	(Canada)	The Hatchet	6 ft 3 in (1.90 m)	205 lb (93 kg)	
Raitis Ivanāns	(Latvia)	Bam Bam	6 ft 4 in (1.93 m)	240 lb (108 kg)	
Barret Jackman	(Canada)	Jacks	6 ft 0 in (1.83 m)	203 lb (92 kg)	
Tim Jackman	(United States)	Sniper	6 ft 2 in (1.88 m)	224 lb (101 kg)	
Val James	(United States)	Muhammad Ali	6 ft 2 in (1.88 m)	205 lb (93 kg)	
Cam Janssen	(United States)	The Red Baron	6 ft 1 in (1.83 m)	215 lb (98 kg)	
Mark Janssens	(Canada)	Duck	6 ft 3 in (1.91 m)	216 lb (98 kg)	
Matt Johnson	(Canada)	Moose	6 ft 5 in (1.96 m)	230 lb (104 kg)	
Terry Johnson	(Canada)	TJ	6 ft 3 in (1.90 m)	210 lb (95 kg)	
Stan Jonathan	(Canada)	Bulldog	5 ft 8 in (1.73 m)	175 lb (79 kg)	
Kevin Kaminski	(Canada)	Killer	5 ft 10 in (1.78 m)	190 lb (86 kg)	
Dave Karpa	(Canada)	Karps	6 ft 1 in (1.85 m)	210 lb (95 kg)	
Matt Kassian	(Canada)	The Kassassin	6 ft 4 in (1.93 m)	195 lb (88 kg)	
Zack Kassian	(Canada)	Kassquatch	6 ft 3 in (1.90 m)	232 lb (105 kg)	
Ed Kastelic	(Canada)	The Special K	6 ft 3 in (1.91 m)	212 lb (96 kg)	
J. Bob Kelly	(Canada)	Battleship	6 ft 2 in (1.88 m)	190 lb (86 kg)	
Forbes Kennedy	(Canada)	Spud	5 ft 8 in (1.73 m)	150 lb (68 kg)	
Alan Kerr	(Canada)	The Real Deal	5 ft 11 in (1.80 m)	195 lb (88 kg)	
Darin Kimble	(Canada)	The Hitman	6 ft 2 in (1.88 m)	205 lb (88 kg)	
D.J. King	(Canada)	The King	6 ft 3 in (1.91 m)	230 lb (104 kg)	
Kris King	(Canada)	Kinger	5 ft 11 in (1.80 m)	202 lb (92 kg)	
David Kočí	(Czech Republic)	The Czech Giant	6 ft 6 in (1.98 m)	238 lb (108 kg)	
Joey Kocur	(Canada)	K.O.	6 ft 0 in (1.82 m)	223 lb (101 kg)	
Zenon Konopka	(Canada)	Zenon the Destroyer	6 ft 0 in (1.83 m)	209 lb (103 kg)	
Jerry Korab	(Canada)	King Kong	6 ft 3 in (1.91 m)	220 lb (100 kg)	
Dan Kordic	(Canada)	Kordy	6 ft 5 in (1.96 m)	220 lb (100 kg)	
John Kordic	(Canada)	Rambo	6 ft 2 in (1.88 m)	210 lb (95 kg)	
Jim Korn	(United States)	The Cobra	6 ft 4 in (1.93 m)	220 lb (100 kg)	
Tom Kostopoulos	(Canada)	TK	6 ft 0 in (1.83 m)	200 lb (90 kg)	
Chris Kotsopoulos	(Canada)	The Big Greek	6 ft 3 in (1.90 m)	215 lb (97 kg)	
Paul Kruse	(Canada)	Kruiser	6 ft 0 in (1.83 m)	202 lb (92 kg)	
Orland Kurtenbach	(Canada)	Big Kurt	6 ft 2 in (1.88 m)	195 lb (88 kg)	
Dale Kushner	(Canada)	Kush	6 ft 1 in (1.85 m)	195 lb (88 kg)	
Nick Kypreos	(Canada)	The Greek Bull	6 ft 0 in (1.83 m)	210 lb (95 kg)	
Jim Kyte	(Canada)	Radio Shack	6 ft 5 in (1.96 m)	210 lb (95 kg)	
Dan LaCouture	(Canada)	The Count	6 ft 2 in (1.88 m)	210 lb (95 kg)	
Marc Laforge	(Canada)	The Shark	6 ft 3 in (1.91 m)	215 lb (98 kg)	
Sasha Lakovic	(Canada)	The Basha	6 ft 0 in (1.83 m)	220 lb (100 kg)	
Denny Lambert	(Canada)	Lambo	5 ft 11 in (1.80 m)	200 lb (91 kg)	
Darren Langdon	(Canada)	Langer	6 ft 1 in (1.85 m)	205 lb (93 kg)	
Ian Laperrière	(Canada)	Lappy	6 ft 1 in (1.85 m)	200 lb (91 kg)	
Georges Laraque	(Canada)	Big Georges	6 ft 3 in (1.91 m)	273 lb (124 kg)	
Paul Laus	(Canada)	Laus Enforcement	6 ft 1 in (1.85 m)	216 lb (98 kg)	
Peter Leboutillier	(Canada)	Boots	6 ft 1 in (1.85 m)	190 lb (86 kg)	
François Leroux	(Canada)	Frankie	6 ft 6 in (1.98 m)	247 lb (112 kg)	
Francis Lessard	(Canada)	Plug	6 ft 3 in (1.91 m)	235 lb (107 kg)	
Pierre-Luc Létourneau-Leblond	(Canada)	PL3	6 ft 2 in (1.88 m)	215 lb (98 kg)	
Reed Low	(Canada)	Lowsy	6 ft 4 in (1.93 m)	220 lb (100 kg)	
Milan Lucic	(Canada)	Looch	6 ft 3 in (1.91 m)	231 lb (105 kg)	
Steve MacIntyre	(Canada)	Big Mac	6 ft 5 in (1.96 m)	250 lb (123 kg)	
Jeff Madill	(Canada)	Pickle	5 ft 11 in (1.80 m)	195 lb (88 kg)	
Keith Magnuson	(Canada)	Maggie	6 ft 0 in (1.83 m)	185 lb (84 kg)	
Kevin Maguire	(Canada)	The Hulk	6 ft 2 in (1.88 m)	200 lb (91 kg)	
David Maley	(United States)	The Mailman	6 ft 2 in (1.88 m)	195 lb (88 kg)	
Troy Mallette	(Canada)	The Iron Lung	6 ft 3 in (1.91 m)	219 lb (99 kg)	
Dan Maloney	(Canada)	Snowshoes	6 ft 1 in (1.85 m)	195 lb (88 kg)	
Dan Mandich	(Canada)	Mando	6 ft 3 in (1.90 m)	205 lb (92 kg)	
Jimmy Mann	(Canada)	The Ox	6 ft 0 in (1.83 m)	205 lb (93 kg)	
Dave Manson	(Canada)	Charlie	6 ft 2 in (1.88 m)	202 lb (92 kg)	
Bryan Marchment	(Canada)	Mush	6 ft 1 in (1.85 m)	200 lb (90 kg)	
Patrick Maroon	(United States)	Big Rig	6 ft 3 in (1.91 m)	234 lb (106 kg)	
Craig Martin	(Canada)	Bussey	6 ft 2 in (1.88 m)	215 lb (97 kg)	
Matt Martin	(Canada)	Marty	6 ft 3 in (1.91 m)	220 lb (100 kg)	
Brad Maxwell	(Canada)	Maxie	6 ft 2 in (1.88 m)	195 lb (88 kg)	
Alan May	(Canada)	The Mad Banker	6 ft 1 in (1.85 m)	200 lb (91 kg)	
Brad May	(Canada)	Mayday	6 ft 1 in (1.85 m)	213 lb (97 kg)	
Jamal Mayers	(Canada)	Jam Diggity	6 ft 1 in (1.85 m)	222 lb (100 kg)	
Chris McAllister	(Canada)	The Giant	6 ft 7 in (2.01 m)	250 lb (110 kg)	
Sandy McCarthy	(Canada)	Sandman	6 ft 3 in (1.90 m)	219 lb (99 kg)	
Darren McCarty	(Canada)	D Mac	6 ft 1 in (1.85 m)	219 lb (99 kg)	
Kevin McClelland	(Canada)	Mac	6 ft 0 in (1.83 m)	190 lb (86 kg)	
Cody McCormick	(Canada)	C Mac	6 ft 2 in (1.88 m)	222 lb (100 kg)	
Max McCormick	(United States)	Mad Max	5 ft 11 in (1.80 m)	188 lb (85 kg)	
Bob McGill	(Canada)	Big Daddy	6 ft 1 in (1.85 m)	205 lb (93 kg)	
Ryan McGill	(Canada)	Gilly	6 ft 2 in (1.88 m)	210 lb (95 kg)	
Brian McGrattan	(Canada)	Big Ern	6 ft 4 in (1.93 m)	235 lb (107 kg)	
Jack McIlhargey	(Canada)	Bucky	6 ft 0 in (183 cm)	200 lb (19 kg)	
Randy McKay	(Canada)	Rocket	6 ft 2 in (1.88 m)	210 lb (95 kg)	
Steve McKenna	(Canada)	Stretch	6 ft 8 in (2.03 m)	252 lb (114 kg)	
Jim McKenzie	(Canada)	Big Mac	6 ft 4 in (1.93 m)	221 lb (100 kg)	
Frazer McLaren	(Canada)	Fraz	6 ft 5 in (1.96 m)	250 lb (110 kg)	
Steve McLaren	(Canada)	Stone Cold	6 ft 0 in (1.83 m)	227 lb (102 kg)	
Cody McLeod	(Canada)	Big Mac	6 ft 2 in (1.88 m)	204 lb (92 kg)	
Adam McQuaid	(Canada)	Darth Quaider	6 ft 4 in (1.93 m)	210 lb (95 kg)	
Basil McRae	(Canada)	Baz	6 ft 2 in (1.88 m)	205 lb (93 kg)	
Chris McRae	(Canada)	Knuckles	6 ft 0 in (1.83 m)	195 lb (88 kg)	
Marty McSorley	(Canada)	McMoose	6 ft 1 in (1.85 m)	235 lb (107 kg)	
Dean Melanson	(Canada)	Mr. Amerk	5 ft 11 in (1.80 m)	190 lb (86 kg)	
Scott Mellanby	(Canada)	The Rat Killer	6 ft 1 in (1.85 m)	208 lb (94 kg)	
Jay Miller	(United States)	The Miller Killer	6 ft 2 in (1.88 m)	210 lb (95 kg)	
Travis Moen	(Canada)	Trapper	6 ft 2 in (1.88 m)	215 lb (97 kg)	
Carl Mokosak	(Canada)	The Baby Bull	6 ft 1 in (1.85 m)	180 lb (81 kg)	
John Mokosak	(Canada)	Moko	5 ft 11 in (1.80 m)	200 lb (90 kg)	
Sergio Momesso	(Canada)	Big Mo	6 ft 3 in (1.90 m)	215 lb (97 kg)	
Steve Montador	(Canada)	The Matador	6 ft 0 in (1.83 m)	210 lb (95 kg)	
Dave Morissette	(Canada)	Moose	6 ft 1 in (1.85 m)	224 lb (101 kg)	
Dana Murzyn	(Canada)	Hank	6 ft 2 in (1.88 m)	200 lb (90 kg)	
Frank Musil	(Czech Republic)	Frankie	6 ft 3 in (1.90 m)	215 lb (97 kg)	
Brantt Myhres	(Canada)	Dicer	6 ft 4 in (1.93 m)	220 lb (100 kg)	
Don Nachbaur	(Canada)	Snack	6 ft 2 in (1.88 m)	200 lb (90 kg)	
Andrei Nazarov	(Russia)	The Russian Bear	6 ft 5 in (1.96 m)	245 lb (111 kg)	
Rumun Ndur	(Nigeria)	The Nigerian Nightmare	6 ft 2 in (1.88 m)	222 lb (100 kg)	
Chris Neil	(Canada)	Neiler	6 ft 1 in (1.85 m)	220 lb (100 kg)	
Barry Nieckar	(Canada)	Nikes	6 ft 3 in (1.90 m)	205 lb (92 kg)	
Chris Nilan	(United States)	Knuckles	6 ft 0 in (1.83 m)	205 lb (93 kg)	
Owen Nolan	(United Kingdom)	Buster	6 ft 1 in (1.85 m)	214 lb (97 kg)	
Gary Nylund	(Canada)	Beaker	6 ft 4 in (1.93 m)	210 lb (95 kg)	
Shane O'Brien	(Canada)	The Gator	6 ft 3 in (1.90 m)	230 lb (104 kg)	
Lyle Odelein	(Canada)	Cornelius	5 ft 11 in (1.80 m)	200 lb (91 kg)	
Jeff Odgers	(Canada)	Odgie	6 ft 0 in (1.83m)	200 lb (91 kg)	
Sean O'Donnell	(Canada)	O.D.	6 ft 2 in (1.88 m)	238 lb (107 kg)	
Gino Odjick	(Canada)	Algonquin Assassin	6 ft 3 in (1.91 m)	215 lb (98 kg)	
Krzysztof Oliwa	(Poland)	The Polish Hammer	6 ft 5 in (1.96 m)	245 lb (111 kg)	
Terry O'Reilly	(Canada)	Taz	6 ft 1 in (1.85 m)	200 lb (91 kg)	
Colton Orr	(Canada)	Colt 45	6 ft 3 in (1.91 m)	228 lb (103 kg)	
Scott Parker	(United States)	The Sheriff	6 ft 5 in (1.96 m)	240 lb (110 kg)	
George Parros	(United States)	The Violent Gentleman	6 ft 5 in (1.96 m)	222 lb (101 kg)	
Davis Payne	(Canada)	Payner	6 ft 2 in (1.88 m)	205 lb (92 kg)	
Rob Pearson	(Canada)	Ruby	6 ft 3 in (1.90 m)	198 lb (89 kg)	
Stephen Peat	(Canada)	The Train	6 ft 2 in (1.88 m)	235 lb (107 kg)	
Anthony Peluso	(Canada)	Pewsy	6 ft 3 in (1.90 m)	225 lb (102 kg)	
Mike Peluso	(United States)	The Animal	6 ft 4 in (1.93 m)	225 lb (102 kg)	
Jim Peplinski	(Canada)	Pepper	6 ft 3 in (1.90 m)	210 lb (95 kg)	
Nathan Perrott	(Canada)	Rock	6 ft 0 in (1.83 m)	225 lb (102 kg)	
Andrew Peters	(Canada)	Petey	6 ft 4 in (1.93 m)	247 lb (112 kg)	
Rich Pilon	(Canada)	Chief	6 ft 0 in (1.83 m)	216 lb (98 kg)	
Larry Playfair	(Canada)	Scary Larry	6 ft 4 in (1.93 m)	215 lb (98 kg)	
Willi Plett	(Paraguay)	The Wild Man	6 ft 3 in (1.91 m)	205 lb (93 kg)	
Rudy Poeschek	(Canada)	Pot Pie	6 ft 2 in (1.88 m)	208 lb (94 kg)	
Dennis Polonich	(Canada)	Polo	5 ft 6 in (1.68 m)	166 lb (75 kg)	
Barry Potomski	(Canada)	Poto	6 ft 2 in (1.88 m)	215 lb (97 kg)	
Marc Potvin	(Canada)	Herm	6 ft 1 in (1.85 m)	200 lb (91 kg)	
Pat Price	(Canada)	The Brat	6 ft 2 in (1.88 m)	200 lb (90 kg)	
Bob Probert	(Canada)	Probie	6 ft 3 in (1.91 m)	225 lb (102 kg)	
Brandon Prust	(Canada)	Prusty	6 ft 0 in (1.83 m)	195 lb (88 kg)	
Dale Purinton	(Canada)	Spike	6 ft 3 in (1.91 m)	226 lb (102 kg)	
Stéphane Quintal	(Canada)	Big Steph	6 ft 3 in (1.91 m)	230 lb (104 kg)	
Rob Ramage	(Canada)	Rammer	6 ft 2 in (1.88 m)	200 lb (90 kg)	
Rob Ray	(Canada)	Rayzor	6 ft 0 in (1.83 m)	222 lb (101 kg)	
Ryan Reaves	(Canada)	Reavo	6 ft 1 in (1.85 m)	229 lb (103 kg)	
Joel Rechlicz	(United States)	Wrecking Ball	6 ft 4 in (1.93 m)	220 lb (100 kg)	
Jeremy Reich	(Canada)	Reicher	6 ft 1 in (1.85 m)	203 lb (92 kg)	
Luke Richardson	(Canada)	Big Luke	6 ft 3 in (1.90 m)	208 lb (94 kg)	
Dave Richter	(Canada)	Beano	6 ft 5 in (1.96 m)	215 lb (98 kg)	
Zac Rinaldo	(Canada)	Rhino	5 ft 10 in (1.78 m)	188 lb (85 kg)	
Gary Rissling	(Canada)	Toy Tiger	5 ft 9 in (1.75 m)	175 lb (79 kg)	
Craig Rivet	(Canada)	The Cat	6 ft 2 in (1.88 m)	207 lb (93 kg)	
Mario Roberge	(Canada)	Robo	5 ft 11 in (1.80 m)	185 lb (84 kg)	
Serge Roberge	(Canada)	Robo	6 ft 1 in (1.85 m)	195 lb (88 kg)	
Torrie Robertson	(Canada)	Torrie the Terrible	5 ft 11 in (1.80 m)	195 lb (88 kg)	
Bobby Robins	(United States)	Blackout Bobby	6 ft 1 in (1.85 m)	220 lb (100 kg)	
Dave Roche	(Canada)	Rochie	6 ft 4 in (1.93 m)	230 lb (104 kg)	
Jay Rosehill	(Canada)	Rosey	6 ft 3 in (1.91 m)	215 lb (98 kg)	
Bob Rouse	(Canada)	Big Dog	6 ft 2 in (1.88 m)	215 lb (97 kg)	
André Roy	(Canada)	Wozzie	6 ft 4 in (1.93 m)	230 lb (104 kg)	
Mike Rupp	(United States)	Sasquatch	6 ft 5 in (1.96 m)	243 lb (110 kg)	
Terry Ruskowski	(Canada)	Roscoe	5 ft 9 in (1.75 m)	168 lb (76 kg)	
Cam Russell	(Canada)	Rusty	6 ft 4 in (1.93m)	200 lb (91 kg)	
Warren Rychel	(Canada)	Bundy	6 ft 0 in (1.83m)	205 lb (93 kg)	
Rick Rypien	(Canada)	Ripper	5 ft 11 in (1.80m)	194 lb (88 kg)	
Ken Sabourin	(Canada)	Sabu	6 ft 3 in (1.90 m)	205 lb (92 kg)	
Bryce Salvador	(Canada)	Sal	6 ft 4 in (1.93 m)	215 lb (97 kg)	
Kevin Sawyer	(Canada)	Saw	6 ft 2 in (1.88 m)	205 lb (93 kg)	
Dwight Schofield	(United States)	Sconan the Barbarian	6 ft 3 in (1.90 m)	195 lb (88 kg)	
Dave Schultz	(Canada)	The Hammer/Sergeant Schultz	6 ft 1 in (1.85 m)	185 lb (84 kg)	
John Scott	(Canada)	Murdersaurus	6 ft 8 in (2.03 m)	270 lb (122 kg)	
Al Secord	(Canada)	Big Al	6 ft 1 in (1.85 m)	205 lb (93 kg)	
Dave Semenko	(Canada)	Cementhead	6 ft 3 in (1.91 m)	228 lb (103 kg)	
Tom Sestito	(United States)	Top Sixtito	6 ft 5 in (1.96 m)	228 lb (103 kg)	
Brent Severyn	(Canada)	The Man of the People	6 ft 2 in (1.88 m)	210 lb (95 kg)	
Neil Sheehy	(Canada)	Harv	6 ft 2 in (1.88 m)	215 lb (98 kg)	
Jody Shelley	(Canada)	Hawk	6 ft 3 in (1.91 m)	230 lb (103 kg)	
Bruce Shoebottom	(Canada)	Shoe	6 ft 2 in (1.88 m)	200 lb (91 kg)	
Eddie Shore	(Canada)	Edmonton Express	5 ft 11 in (1.80 m)	194 lb (88 kg)	
Martin Simard	(Canada)	Marty	6 ft 1 in (1.85 m)	215 lb (98 kg)	
Chris Simon	(Canada)	The Warrior	6 ft 3 in (1.91 m)	232 lb (105 kg)	
Jason Simon	(Canada)	The Chief	6 ft 1 in (1.85 m)	210 lb (95 kg)	
Reid Simpson	(Canada)	The Undertaker	6 ft 1 in (1.85 m)	210 lb (95 kg)	
Todd Simpson	(Canada)	Simmer	6 ft 3 in (1.90 m)	218 lb (98 kg)	
Rob Skrlac	(Canada)	The Cranium	6 ft 5 in (1.96 m)	245 lb (111 kg)	
Steve Smith	(United Kingdom)	Smitty	6 ft 4 in (1.93 m)	215 lb (97 kg)	
Greg Smyth	(Canada)	Bird Dog	6 ft 4 in (1.93 m)	235 lb (107 kg)	
Harold Snepsts	(Canada)	The Hammer	6 ft 3 in (1.90 m)	210 lb (95 kg)	
Daryl Stanley	(Canada)	Stan the Man	6 ft 3 in (1.91 m)	210 lb (95 kg)	
Brad Staubitz	(Canada)	Mitchum Man	6 ft 1 in (1.85 m)	215 lb (97 kg)	
Ronnie Stern	(Canada)	Hound Dog	6 ft 0 in (1.83 m)	195 lb (88 kg)	
Jeremy Stevenson	(United States)	Stevie	6 ft 1 in (1.85 m)	215 lb (97 kg)	
Turner Stevenson	(Canada)	T	6 ft 3 in (1.90 m)	220 lb (99 kg)	
Allan Stewart	(Canada)	Stewy	6 ft 0 in (1.83 m)	195 lb (88 kg)	
Paul Stewart	(United States)	Stew Cat	6 ft 1 in (1.85 m)	195 lb (88 kg)	
P.J. Stock	(Canada)	The Stock Exchange	5 ft 11 in (1.78 m)	183 lb (86 kg)	
Zack Stortini	(Canada)	Zorg	6 ft 4 in (1.93 m)	215 lb (97 kg)	
Mike Stothers	(Canada)	Campy	6 ft 4 in (1.93 m)	212 lb (96 kg)	
Jason Strudwick	(Canada)	DJ Suitcase	6 ft 4 in (1.93 m)	226 lb (102 kg)	
Chris Tamer	(United States)	The Tamer	6 ft 2 in (1.88 m)	212 lb (96 kg)	
Nick Tarnasky	(Canada)	Nasty	6 ft 2 in (1.88 m)	230 lb (104 kg)	
Joey Tetarenko	(Canada)	Tets	6 ft 2 in (1.88 m)	215 lb (97 kg)	
Rocky Thompson	(Canada)	Rocky Hockey	6 ft 4 in (1.88 m)	200 lb (91 kg)	
Jim Thomson	(Canada)	Top Gun	6 ft 1 in (1.85 m)	205 lb (93 kg)	
Chris Thorburn	(Canada)	Thorbdog	6 ft 3 in (1.91 m)	235 lb (107 kg)	
Scott Thornton	(Canada)	Thorty	6 ft 3 in (1.90 m)	220 lb (99 kg)	
Shawn Thornton	(Canada)	Sugar Shawn	6 ft 2 in (1.88 m)	217 lb (98 kg)	
Billy Tibbetts	(United States)	Billy the Kid	6 ft 2 in (1.88 m)	215 lb (97 kg)	
Mark Tinordi	(Canada)	The Beast	6 ft 4 in (1.93 m)	213 lb (96 kg)	
Rick Tocchet	(Canada)	Taco	6 ft 0 in (1.83 m)	210 lb (95 kg)	
Perry Turnbull	(Canada)	Percy	6 ft 2 in (1.88 m)	200 lb (90 kg)	
Tony Twist	(Canada)	Twister	6 ft 1 in (1.85 m)	235 lb (107 kg)	
Boris Valábik	(Slovakia)	Bobo	6 ft 7 in (2.01 m)	245 lb (111 kg)	
Wayne Van Dorp	(Canada)	Swoop	6 ft 4 in (1.93 m)	225 lb (102 kg)	
Ryan VandenBussche	(Canada)	Bushy	6 ft 0 in (1.83 m)	205 lb (93 kg)	
Jim Vandermeer	(Canada)	Vandy	6 ft 1 in (1.85 m)	210 lb (95 kg)	
Pete Vandermeer	(Canada)	Mayor of Hershey	6 ft 0 in (1.83 m)	209 lb (94 kg)	
Dennis Vial	(Canada)	Dancin Bear	6 ft 1 in (1.85 m)	205 lb (91 kg)	
Aaron Voros	(Canada)	Scarecrow	6 ft 4 in (1.93 m)	215 lb (97 kg)	
Mick Vukota	(Canada)	Mickster	6 ft 2 in (1.88 m)	215 lb (98 kg)	
Matt Walker	(Canada)	Walks	6 ft 4 in (1.93 m)	215 lb (97 kg)	
Bryan Watson	(Canada)	Bugsy	5 ft 9 in (1.75 m)	170 lb (77 kg)	
Steve Webb	(Canada)	Webby	6 ft 0 in (1.83 m)	224 lb (102 kg)	
Jay Wells	(Canada)	The Hammer	6 ft 1 in (1.85 m)	205 lb (93 kg)	
John Wensink	(Canada)	Wire	6 ft 0 in (1.83 m)	200 lb (91 kg)	
Brian Wesenberg	(Canada)	Wesy	6 ft 3 in (1.90 m)	187 lb (84 kg)	
Kevin Westgarth	(Canada)	Westie	6 ft 4 in (1.93 m)	228 lb (103 kg)	
Jason Wiemer	(Canada)	Wiems	6 ft 1 in (1.85 m)	225 lb (102 kg)	
David Williams	(Canada)	Tiger	5 ft 11 in (1.80 m)	190 lb (86 kg)	
Behn Wilson	(Canada)	Big Behn	6 ft 3 in (1.91 m)	210 lb (95 kg)	
Brendan Witt	(Canada)	Bammer	6 ft 2 in (1.88 m)	223 lb (101 kg)	
Dody Wood	(Canada)	Woody	5 ft 11 in (1.80 m)	180 lb (82 kg)	
Peter Worrell	(Canada)	Big Pete	6 ft 7 in (2.01 m)	250 lb (113 kg)	
Richard Zemlak	(Canada)	Scruffy	6 ft 2 in (1.88 m)	190 lb (86 kg)	
