= List of NBA career ejections leaders =

The following list shows the National Basketball Association (NBA) players with the most career ejections. Ejections occurs most often due to players committing various physical actions and unsportsmanlike conduct.

== List ==
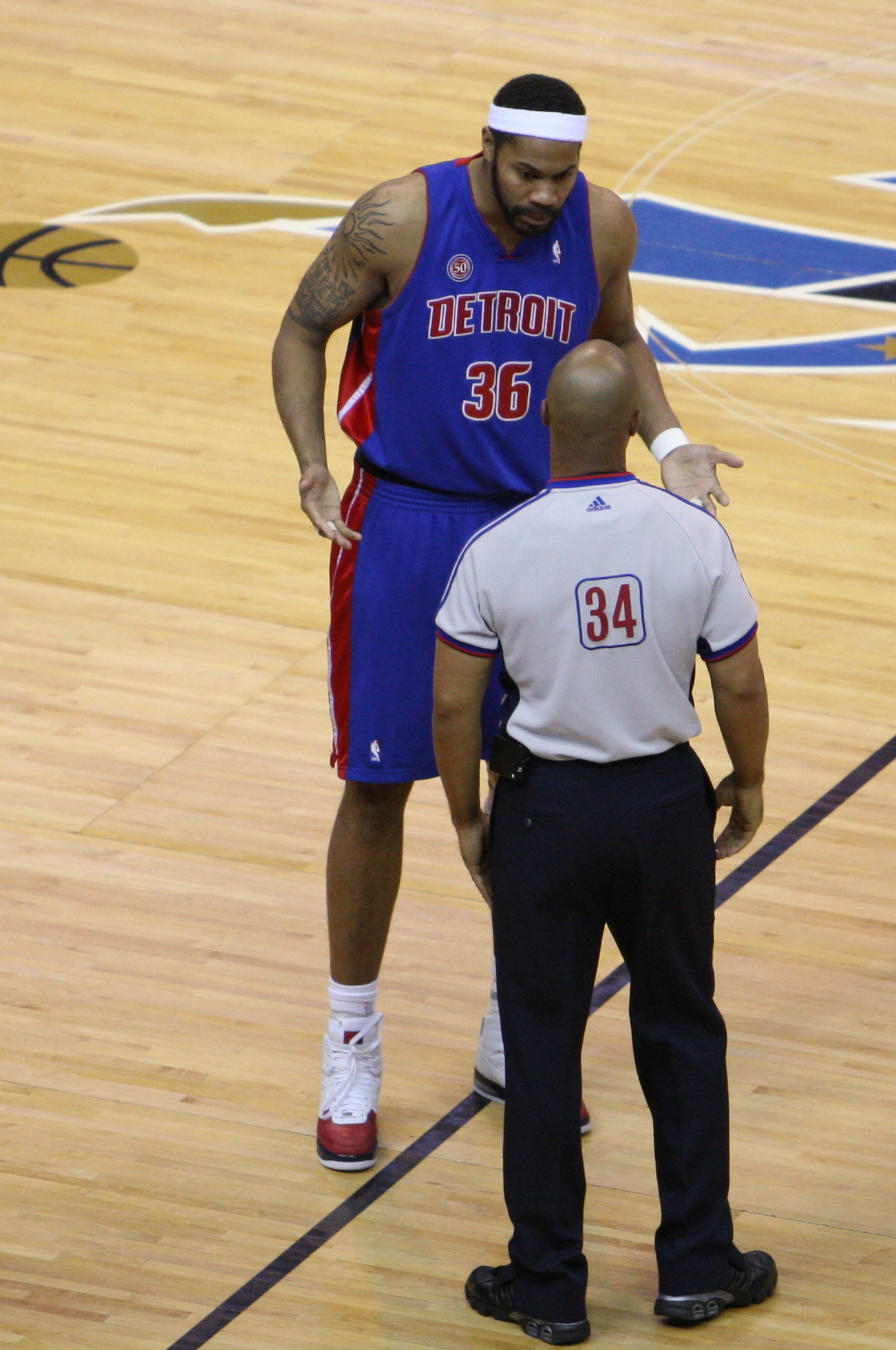
Rasheed Wallace, the all-time leader in ejections, arguing with a referee.

Statistics accurate as of November 02, 2026.

^	Active NBA player

No.	Name	Total	Ref(s)
1	Rasheed Wallace	29	
2	Draymond Green^	27	
3	DeMarcus Cousins	18	
4	Dwight Howard	17	
5	Charles Barkley	16	
5	Anthony Mason	16	
7	Shaquille O'Neal	14	
8	Matt Barnes	13	
9	Kenyon Martin	12	
9	Dennis Rodman	12	
9	Dillon Brooks^	12	
9	Reggie Miller	12	
13	Gary Payton	11	
13	Stephen Jackson	11	
13	Carmelo Anthony	11	
13	Russell Westbrook	11	
13	Metta World Peace	11	
13	Patrick Beverley	11	
