= Marcus Morris Sr. =

American basketball player (born 1989)

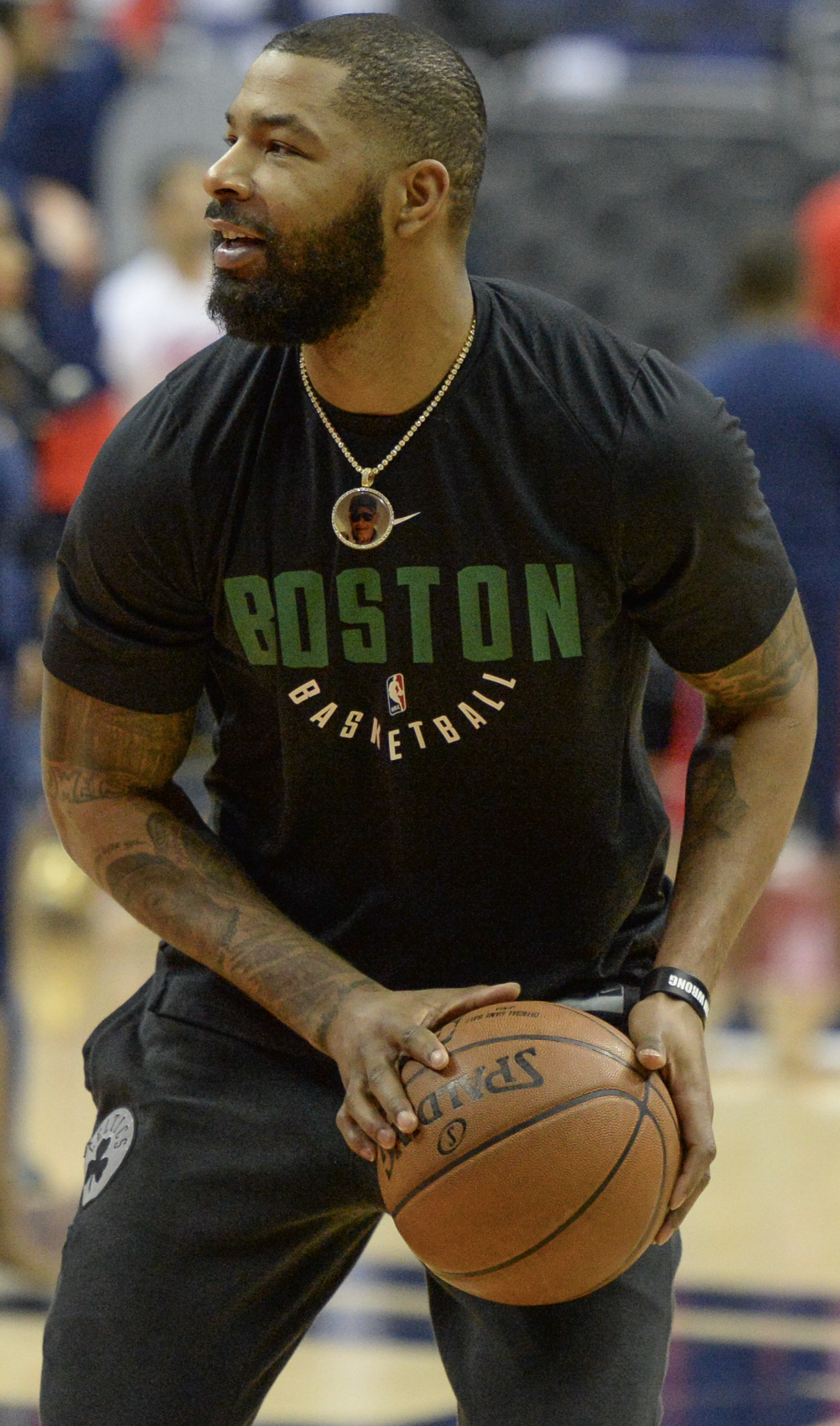
- Morris with the Boston Celtics in 2018

Free agent
- Position: Power forward

Personal information
- Born: September 2, 1989 (age 37) Philadelphia, Pennsylvania, U.S.
- Listed height: 6 ft 8 in (2.03 m)
- Listed weight: 218 lb (99 kg)

Career information
- High school: Prep Charter (Philadelphia, Pennsylvania); APEX Academy (Pennsauken, New Jersey)
- College: Kansas (2008–2011)
- NBA draft: 2011: 1st round, 14th overall pick
- Drafted by: Houston Rockets
- Playing career: 2011–present

Career history
- 2011–2013: Houston Rockets
- 2012: →Rio Grande Valley Vipers
- 2013–2015: Phoenix Suns
- 2015–2017: Detroit Pistons
- 2017–2019: Boston Celtics
- 2019–2020: New York Knicks
- 2020–2023: Los Angeles Clippers
- 2023–2024: Philadelphia 76ers
- 2024: Cleveland Cavaliers

Career highlights
- Consensus second-team All-American (2011); Big 12 Player of the Year (2011); First-team All-Big 12 (2011); Big 12 All-Rookie Team (2009); No. 22 jersey retired by Kansas Jayhawks
- Stats at NBA.com
- Stats at Basketball Reference

Marcus Thomas Morris Sr. (born September 2, 1989) is a former American professional basketball player who last played for the Cleveland Cavaliers of the National Basketball Association (NBA). He played college basketball for the Kansas Jayhawks before being selected 14th overall by the Houston Rockets in the 2011 NBA draft.

== Early life ==
Morris was born in Philadelphia, Pennsylvania, to Thomasine "Angel" Morris. He has four brothers, Donte, Blake, David and twin Markieff, who also plays in the NBA.

Considered a four-star recruit by Rivals.com, Morris was listed as the No. 10 power forward and the No. 29 player in the nation in 2008.

== College career ==
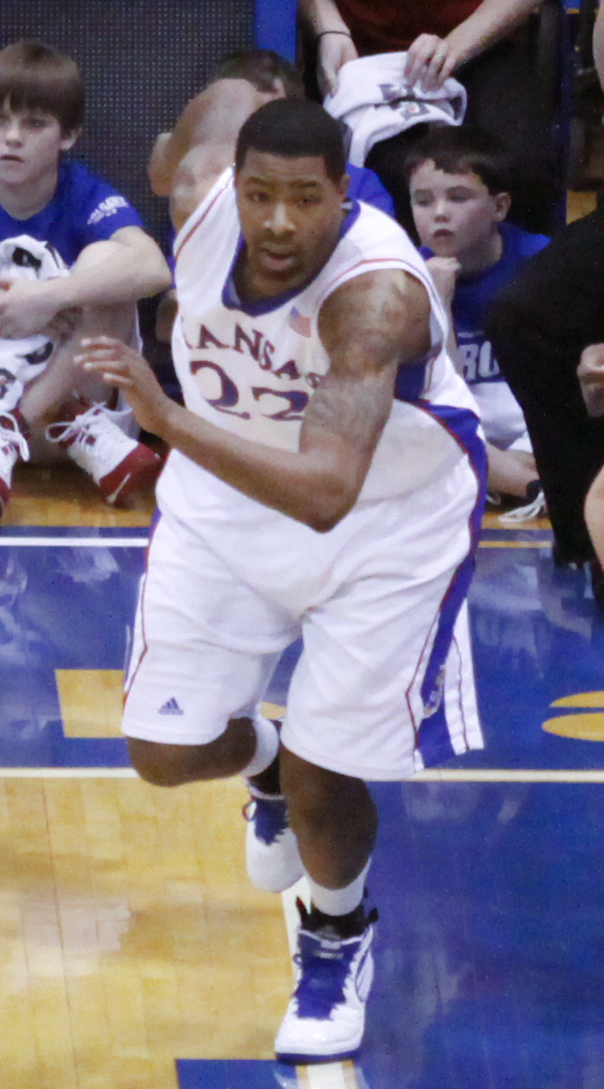
Morris at Kansas

Morris attended the University of Kansas, where he majored in American studies. Morris was named the 2010–11 Big 12 Conference Men's Basketball Player of the Year. He also was named a second team All-American for his play in the 2010–11 basketball season by both the Associated Press and the National Association of Basketball Coaches, and a third team All-America by Fox Sports. On March 30, 2011, Morris was named to the ten-member John R. Wooden Award Men's All American team. Morris and his brother signed with a sports agent from Los Angeles, and announced that they would enter the 2011 NBA draft.

== Professional career ==
=== Houston Rockets (2011–2013) ===
Morris was selected by the Houston Rockets with the 14th overall pick in the 2011 NBA draft, five minutes after his brother Markieff was taken with the 13th pick by the Phoenix Suns. Morris was assigned to the Rio Grande Valley Vipers of the NBA Development League on January 2, 2012. In his first game in the D-League on January 6, 2012, he recorded 33 points and 16 rebounds in a narrow 105–103 loss to the Dakota Wizards. Morris returned to the Rockets on January 16, was reassigned to the Rio Grande Valley Vipers on February 3, and returned to the Rockets again on February 20.

After an injury to Patrick Patterson, Rockets head coach Kevin McHale named Morris the opening day starter at power forward for the 2012–13 season. When told he would be starting, Morris thought McHale was kidding, since he rarely played his rookie season and was hurt during the preseason. During the course of the season, Morris was the backup power forward to Patterson, and started 17 games while Patterson was injured. His three-point shot was much improved from his rookie season, more than tripling the percentage from 12% to 38%.

=== Phoenix Suns (2013–2015) ===
On February 21, 2013, Morris was traded to the Phoenix Suns, reuniting him with his brother Markieff. The next day, Morris played his first game with his brother in the last six minutes of a loss to the Boston Celtics, as he recorded seven points, two steals, and a rebound, despite having no formal training from the Suns before entering the game. This marked the second time that twin brothers played for the same NBA team; Dick and Tom Van Arsdale also played together for the Suns during the 1976–77 season. On March 1, 2013, Morris scored 16 points to help the Suns defeat the Atlanta Hawks 92–87. He made four out of five three-point attempts. Morris went on to start alongside Markieff on March 9, 2013, against his former team, the Rockets, which made the Morris twins the first set of twins to ever start for the same NBA team.

On September 29, 2014, Morris signed a multi-year contract extension with the Suns. In the Suns' 2014–15 season opener on October 29, 2014, he recorded 21 points in the 119–99 win over the Los Angeles Lakers. On January 7 game against the Minnesota Timberwolves, Morris received a technical foul and was caught on national TV berating head coach Jeff Hornacek about the situation. It resulted in Morris not playing for the rest of the game. His other antics during his final season with the Suns and afterwards, though, led to AZCentral.com labeling him one of Arizona's biggest sports villains.

On February 6, 2015, Morris recorded his first career double-double with career highs of 34 points and 12 rebounds in a 100–93 victory over the Utah Jazz. Morris' double-double off the bench marked him as just the second player after Brook Lopez in 2014–15 to record a 30-point, 10-rebound game off the bench. The last Suns player to do it was Danny Manning in 1997. On March 22 against the Dallas Mavericks, the Morris twins had double-doubles in the same game for the first time in their professional careers.

=== Detroit Pistons (2015–2017) ===
On July 9, 2015, Morris was traded to the Detroit Pistons, along with Reggie Bullock and Danny Granger, in exchange for a 2020 second-round draft pick. He made his debut for the Pistons on October 27, 2015, in the team's season-opener against the Atlanta Hawks. In 37 minutes of action as a starter, Morris recorded 18 points and 10 rebounds in a 106–94 victory. On April 1, 2016, he scored a season-high 31 points in a 98–89 loss to the Dallas Mavericks. The Pistons finished the regular season as the eighth seed in the Eastern Conference with a 44–38 record, earning a playoff berth for the first time since 2009. In their first-round series against the top-seeded eventual champion Cleveland Cavaliers, the Pistons were swept 4–0.

On February 3, 2017, Morris scored a career-high 36 points in a 116–108 victory over the Minnesota Timberwolves. On February 28, he set a new career high with 37 points in a 120–113 overtime victory over the Portland Trail Blazers.

=== Boston Celtics (2017–2019) ===
On July 7, 2017, Morris was traded to the Boston Celtics in exchange for Avery Bradley and a 2019 second-round draft pick. On March 31, 2018, he scored 25 points in a 110–99 victory over the Toronto Raptors. It was Morris' fourth straight game with at least 20 points, setting a career high.

=== New York Knicks (2019–2020) ===
On July 16, 2019, Morris signed with the New York Knicks. On January 5, 2020, Morris scored a career-high 38 points and tied his career high for field goals made (13) in a 135–132 loss against the Los Angeles Clippers.

=== Los Angeles Clippers (2020–2023) ===
On February 6, 2020, the Knicks traded Morris to the Los Angeles Clippers in a three-team trade with the Washington Wizards, sending Maurice Harkless to New York and Jerome Robinson to Washington; the Clippers also acquired Isaiah Thomas from the Wizards in the trade.

Morris debuted for the Clippers on February 9, 2020, scoring 10 points in a 133–92 victory over the Cleveland Cavaliers. In the first round of the 2020 NBA playoffs, he was ejected during Game 6 after committing a flagrant foul on Luka Dončić and was fined $35,000, but was never suspended. In the 2020 Western Conference Semifinals, Morris notably had an altercation with Paul Millsap as the Clippers fell in seven games after the Nuggets came back from a 3–1 series deficit. Morris averaged 11.8 points and 4.8 rebounds during the playoffs.

On November 25, 2020, Morris re-signed with the Clippers on a 4-year, $64 million contract.

=== Philadelphia 76ers (2023–2024) ===
On November 1, 2023, the Philadelphia 76ers acquired Morris, Nicolas Batum, Kenyon Martin Jr. and Robert Covington from the Clippers in exchange for James Harden, P. J. Tucker, and Filip Petrušev. As part of the trade, the Clippers dealt a first-round pick, two second-round picks, a pick swap, and cash considerations to the 76ers, while sending a pick swap and cash considerations to the Oklahoma City Thunder.

On February 8, 2024, Morris was traded to the San Antonio Spurs in a three-team deal involving the Indiana Pacers. However, he did not play any games for the Spurs, and was waived on February 29.

=== Cleveland Cavaliers (2024) ===
On March 18, 2024, Morris signed a 10-day contract with the Cleveland Cavaliers, and on March 29, he signed for the rest of the season.

On September 15, 2024, Morris re-signed with the New York Knicks, but was waived on September 28.

== Career statistics ==
Legend
GP	Games played	GS	Games started	MPG	Minutes per game
FG%	Field goal percentage	3P%	3-point field goal percentage	FT%	Free throw percentage
RPG	Rebounds per game	APG	Assists per game	SPG	Steals per game
BPG	Blocks per game	PPG	Points per game	**Bold**	Career high

=== NBA ===
==== Regular season ====
Year	Team	GP	GS	MPG	FG%	3P%	FT%	RPG	APG	SPG	BPG	PPG
2011–12	Houston	17	0	7.4	.296	.118	.750	.9	.2	.1	.1	2.4
2012–13	Houston	54	17	21.4	.428	.381	.653	4.1	.9	.5	.3	8.6
2012–13	Phoenix	23	6	16.1	.405	.308	.405	2.5	.7	.8	.2	5.7
2013–14	Phoenix	**82**	1	22.0	.442	.381	.761	3.9	1.1	**.9**	.2	9.7
2014–15	Phoenix	81	35	25.2	.434	.358	.628	4.8	1.6	.8	.2	10.4
2015–16	Detroit	80	**80**	**35.7**	.434	.362	.749	5.1	**2.5**	.8	.3	14.1
2016–17	Detroit	79	79	32.5	.418	.331	.784	4.6	2.0	.7	.3	14.0
2017–18	Boston	54	21	26.7	.429	.368	.805	5.4	1.3	.6	.2	13.6
2018–19	Boston	75	53	27.9	.447	.375	.844	**6.1**	1.5	.6	.3	13.9
2019–20	New York	43	43	32.3	.442	.439	.823	5.4	1.4	.8	.4	**19.6**
2019–20	L.A. Clippers	19	19	28.9	.425	.310	.818	4.1	1.4	.7	**.7**	10.1
2020–21	L.A. Clippers	57	29	26.3	**.473**	**.473**	.820	4.1	1.0	.6	.3	13.4
2021–22	L.A. Clippers	54	54	29.0	.434	.367	**.872**	4.4	2.1	.5	.3	15.4
2022–23	L.A. Clippers	65	65	28.1	.426	.364	.782	4.0	1.8	.6	.3	11.2
2023–24	Philadelphia	37	7	17.2	.439	.400	.861	2.9	.7	.4	.3	6.7
2023–24	Cleveland	12	0	15.0	.441	.414	.625	2.1	.8	.2	.2	5.8
Career		832	509	26.6	.435	.377	.774	4.4	1.5	.7	.3	12.0

==== Playoffs ====
Year	Team	GP	GS	MPG	FG%	3P%	FT%	RPG	APG	SPG	BPG	PPG
2016	Detroit	4	4	**36.0**	.468	.389	.870	3.3	**2.5**	.5	.0	**17.8**
2018	Boston	**19**	4	29.6	.368	.417	.712	5.4	1.1	.4	.3	12.4
2019	Boston	9	4	28.3	**.519**	.450	.742	**8.1**	1.2	.1	**.6**	13.7
2020	L.A. Clippers	13	13	29.9	.505	**.475**	.929	4.8	1.6	**.8**	.1	11.8
2021	L.A. Clippers	**19**	**18**	31.8	.430	.375	.750	4.3	1.5	.5	.5	12.2
2023	L.A. Clippers	3	2	22.8	.345	.167	**1.000**	4.0	.0	.3	.3	8.7
2024	Cleveland	9	1	15.3	.458	.391	.667	2.8	.3	.4	.0	6.1
Career		76	46	28.4	.433	.406	.771	4.9	1.2	.5	.3	11.8

=== College ===
Year	Team	GP	GS	MPG	FG%	3P%	FT%	RPG	APG	SPG	BPG	PPG
2008–09	Kansas	35	22	18.5	.495	**.400**	.604	4.7	1.1	**1.0**	.3	7.4
2009–10	Kansas	36	33	24.7	**.570**	.375	.660	6.1	1.0	.9	.3	12.8
2010–11	Kansas	**38**	**36**	**28.3**	**.570**	.342	**.688**	**7.6**	**1.6**	.8	**.6**	**17.2**
Career		109	91	24.0	.555	.358	.660	6.2	1.3	.9	.4	12.6

== Personal life ==
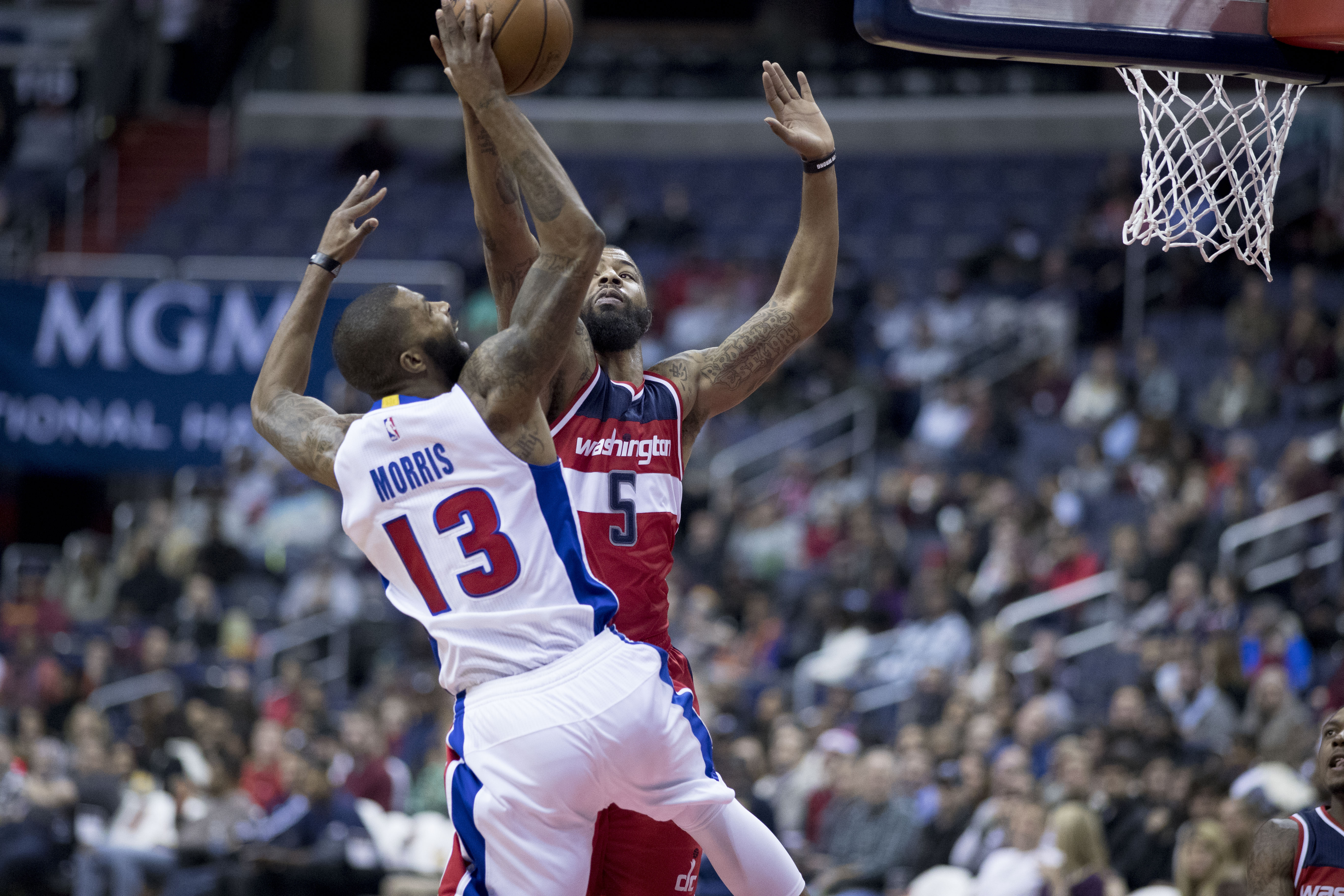
Morris (left) and his brother Markieff Morris, 2016

Morris is seven minutes younger than his fraternal twin brother, Markieff. He is a fan of his hometown Philadelphia Eagles while Markieff roots for the rival Dallas Cowboys. His nicknames are "Mook" and "Flask Dad". Morris' girlfriend Amber Soulds gave birth to a son, Marcus Jr., on July 20, 2018. Beginning with the 2018–19 season, Morris donned "Morris Sr." on the back of his gameday jersey.

The Morris brothers and former teammates Goran and Zoran Dragić all briefly played for the Suns during the fourth quarter of the team's January 2, 2015 112–96 victory over the Philadelphia 76ers. It marked the first time in the NBA's history that two pairs of brothers were on the court for the same team at the same time.

On February 26, 2012, the state of Kansas filed battery charges against Morris and another assailant, Julius K. Harris, for punching an employee of the Cave, a bar and nightclub in Lawrence, Kansas in which they had been watching the final Border War basketball match between Kansas and Missouri. Morris and Harris entered a diversion agreement for the battery charge, with Morris paying a $300 diversion fee, $60 in court fees, and agreeing not to come in contact with the victim or The Cave for one year.

On January 24, 2015, Marcus and Markieff Morris were involved in two aggravated assault cases as five different men (including the twins and former Baltimore Ravens safety Gerald Bowman) allegedly assaulted 36-year-old Eric Hood outside the Nina Mason Pulliam Recreation Center in Phoenix, Arizona. Hood mentored the Morris twins from high school until the end of their college careers; the brothers assaulted Hood for "sending an inappropriate text message" to their mother. The case against the Morris brothers was first brought on August 3, 2015; the trial concluded on October 3, 2017, with the twins and Gerald Bowman found not guilty and the accused Julius Kane and Christopher Melendez Jr. confessing their guilt in September 2017. In spite of the resolution the incident was considered a catalyst for the Suns trading Marcus to the Pistons on July 9, 2015 and a factor in dealing his brother to the Washington Wizards on February 18, 2016.

On January 11, 2024, Morris was awarded the key to the City of Philadelphia for his contributions on and off the court. The Morris twins helped create the Family Over Everything Foundation, an organization that assists members of under-served communities in Philadelphia and other cities.

On July 27, 2025, Morris was arrested in Broward County, Florida on an out-of-state related fraud-insufficient funds check charge, $265,000 worth of bad checks were written. Morris was then detained without bond. On August 7, the fraud and theft charges against Morris, which had been filed in Las Vegas, Nevada, were dismissed after he agreed to pay off $265,000 in gambling debts which he owed to the Wynn Las Vegas and the MGM Grand Hotels and Casinos in Las Vegas.
