= Frank Mason III =

American basketball player (born 1994)

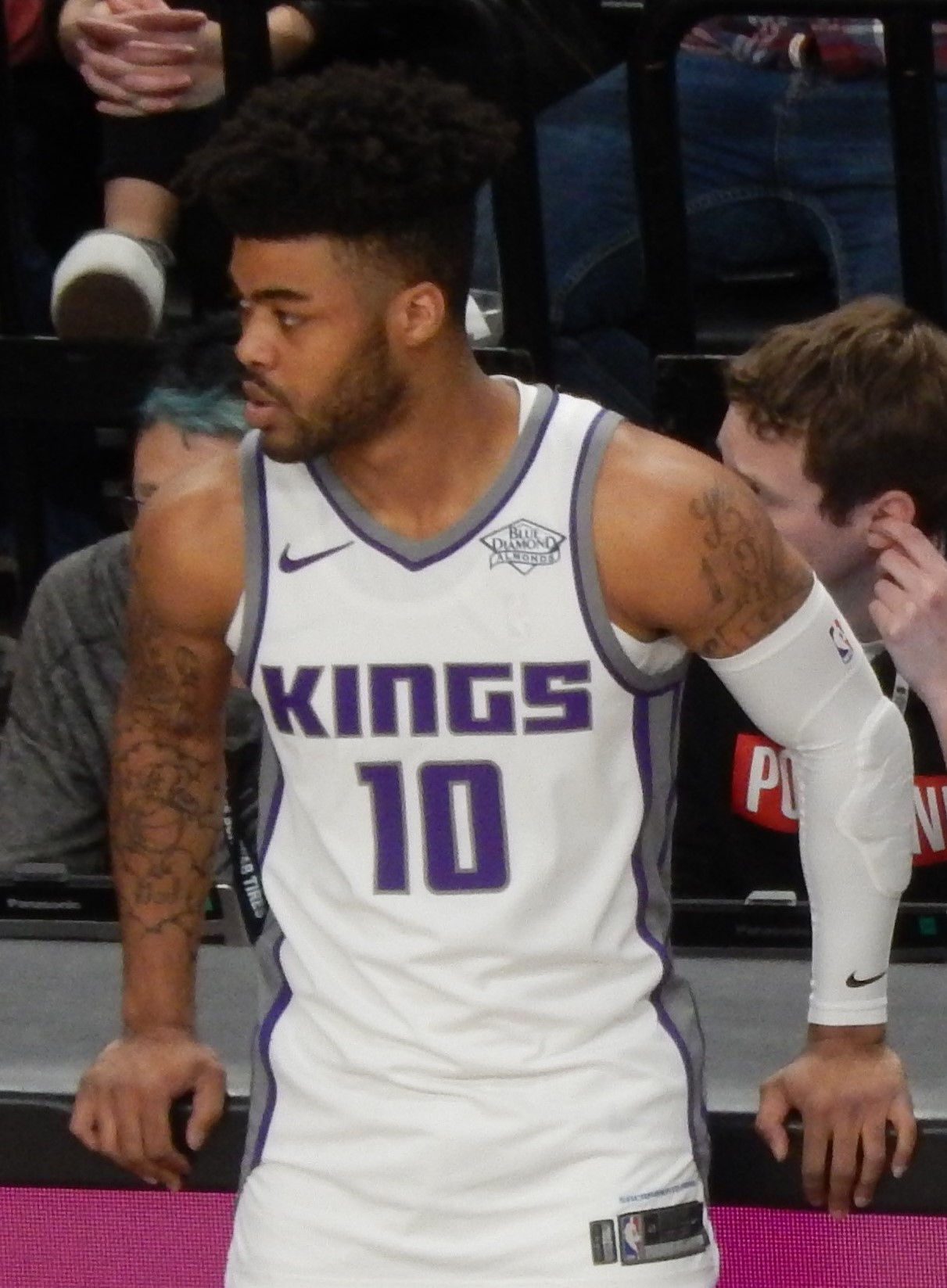
- Mason with the Sacramento Kings in 2018

Free agent
- Position: Point guard

Personal information
- Born: April 3, 1994 (age 32) Petersburg, Virginia, U.S.
- Listed height: 5 ft 11 in (1.80 m)
- Listed weight: 190 lb (86 kg)

Career information
- High school: Petersburg (Petersburg, Virginia); Massanutten Military Academy (Woodstock, Virginia)
- College: Kansas (2013–2017)
- NBA draft: 2017: 2nd round, 34th overall pick
- Drafted by: Sacramento Kings
- Playing career: 2017–present

Career history
- 2017–2019: Sacramento Kings
- 2019–2020: Milwaukee Bucks
- 2019–2020: →Wisconsin Herd
- 2021: Orlando Magic
- 2021–2022: South Bay Lakers
- 2022: Wisconsin Herd
- 2023–2024: SLUC Nancy Basket
- 2024: Fujian Sturgeons
- 2025: Leones de Ponce
- 2025–2026: Limoges CSP

Career highlights
- NBA G League MVP (2020); All-NBA G League First Team (2020); National college player of the year (2017); Consensus first-team All-American (2017); Bob Cousy Award (2017); Big 12 Player of the Year (2017); First-team All-Big 12 (2017); 2× Second-team All-Big 12 (2015, 2016); Big 12 All-Defensive Team (2016)
- Stats at NBA.com
- Stats at Basketball Reference
Medals
Men's basketball
Representing United States
Summer Universiade
Gold medal – first place	2015 Gwangju	Team competition
FIBA AmeriCup
Bronze medal – third place	2022 Brazil

Frank Leo Mason III (born April 3, 1994) is an American professional basketball player who most recently played for Limoges CSP of the LNB Élite. He played college basketball for the University of Kansas, where he was the starting point guard for the Jayhawks. For the 2016–17 season, he was the consensus National Player of the Year He was also a consensus All-American selection for his senior season at Kansas.

Mason was selected 34th overall in the 2017 NBA draft by the Sacramento Kings, where he spent two seasons before signing with the Milwaukee Bucks as a free agent in July 2019. He signed with the Orlando Magic in February 2021.

== Early life ==
Mason grew up in Petersburg, Virginia and went to Petersburg High School. He scored 1,901 points in his four-year career at Petersburg, which is the second-highest scoring total in school history behind Hall of Famer Moses Malone.

Mason had originally signed to attend Towson University in Towson, Maryland during his senior year, but he lost his eligibility after failing a government class. Mason attended Massanutten Military Academy in Woodstock, Virginia to make up for the failing grade in government. After being discovered playing the Amateur Athletic Union circuit by Kansas Assistant Coach Kurtis Townsend, Mason was offered a scholarship by the University of Kansas.

== College career ==
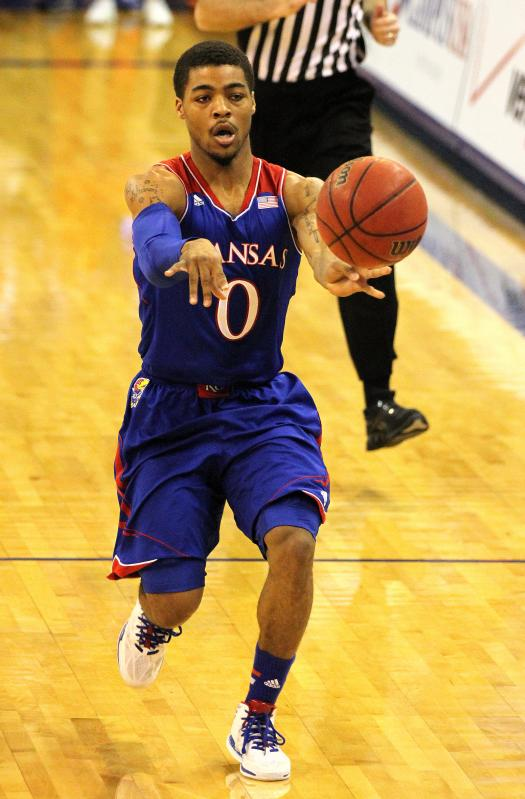
Mason makes a pass during a 2013 game

As a sophomore at Kansas, he was a second team All Big 12 selection. He averaged 12.6 points, 3.9 rebounds, and 3.9 assists per game as a sophomore, an increase from the 5.5 points, 1.3 rebounds, and 2.1 assists per game he averaged as a freshman.

During his junior season, Mason averaged 12.9 points and 4.6 assists and was named to the Big 12 All-Defensive Team.

His regular season culminated in receiving multiple awards. He was unanimously selected as the Big 12 Player of the Year, averaging 20.5 points and 5.1 assists in the regular season. He was also consensus first team All-American selection, the NCAA-leading 29th first-team selection in Kansas basketball history. He was the first consensus National Player of the Year in Jayhawks history.

== Professional career ==
=== Sacramento Kings (2017–2019) ===
Mason was drafted by the Sacramento Kings with the 34th pick in the 2017 NBA draft. He played in the NBA Summer League for the Kings, where he scored 24 points in 24 minutes against the Los Angeles Lakers on July 10, 2017, adding 6 assists, 5 rebounds and 2 steals. For the full 2017–18 regular NBA season, Mason averaged 7.9 points, 2.5 rebounds and 2.8 assists in 52 games.

Mason was waived by the Kings on July 4, 2019.

=== Milwaukee Bucks (2019–2020) ===
Mason signed a two-way contract with the Milwaukee Bucks on July 26, 2019. In the deal, he split time between the Bucks and their NBA G League affiliate, the Wisconsin Herd. In the G League, he scored 44 points in a win over the Grand Rapids Drive on February 19, 2020.

Mason was awarded the NBA G League MVP for the 2019–20 season on June 25, 2020. He averaged 26.4 points, 5.0 assists and 3.4 rebounds per game with the Herd.

=== Orlando Magic (2021) ===
On December 18, 2020, Mason signed with the Philadelphia 76ers, but was waived the next day and signed with their NBA G League affiliate, the Delaware Blue Coats. However, on February 3, 2021, the Orlando Magic signed him to a two-way contract right before the beginning of the G League season. However, Mason was waived on February 15 after playing in four games. Two days later, he was re-acquired by Delaware, but was waived on March 5 after suffering a season-ending injury. He didn't log any minutes with the Blue Coats.

=== South Bay Lakers (2021–2022) ===
Mason joined the Philadelphia 76ers for the 2021 NBA Summer League.

On October 13, 2021, Mason signed with the Los Angeles Lakers and was waived the following day. On October 23, he signed with the South Bay Lakers as an affiliate player. In seven games, he averaged 9.1 points, 3.0 rebounds and 3.3 assists per game.

=== Wisconsin Herd (2022) ===
On February 24, 2022, Mason was traded, along with a 2022 first-round pick, to the Wisconsin Herd in exchange for Tremont Waters and a 2022 second-round pick.

In November 2022, he signed with Beirut Club of the Lebanese Basketball League.

=== SLUC Nancy (2023–2024) ===
On January 15, 2023, Mason signed with SLUC Nancy Basket of the LNB Pro A.

On June 22, 2024, Mason signed with Scafati Basket of the Lega Basket Serie A (LBA). In September 2024, he left the team.

=== Fujian Sturgeons (2024) ===
On October 5, 2024, Mason signed with Fujian Sturgeons of the Chinese Basketball Association (CBA).

=== Leones de Ponce (2025) ===
On February 14, 2025, Mason signed with Leones de Ponce of the Baloncesto Superior Nacional (BSN).

=== Limoges CSP (2025–present) ===
On August 10, 2025, he signed with Limoges CSP of the LNB Pro A.

== National team career ==
Mason and the Kansas Jayhawks competed on behalf of the United States in the 2015 World University Games. He scored 18 points in a double-overtime victory over Germany in the gold medal game and received the Finals MVP award.

== Personal life ==
Mason grew up in the housing project of Pin Oak Estates located in Petersburg, Virginia, where he developed his game and earned the nickname "The Phenom" by local onlookers within the community. Mason has a son named Amari.

== Career statistics ==
Legend
GP	Games played	GS	Games started	MPG	Minutes per game
FG%	Field goal percentage	3P%	3-point field goal percentage	FT%	Free throw percentage
RPG	Rebounds per game	APG	Assists per game	SPG	Steals per game
BPG	Blocks per game	PPG	Points per game	**Bold**	Career high

=== NBA ===
==== Regular season ====
Year	Team	GP	GS	MPG	FG%	3P%	FT%	RPG	APG	SPG	BPG	PPG
2017–18	Sacramento	**52**	**2**	18.9	.379	.360	**.817**	2.5	2.8	**.7**	**.2**	**7.9**
2018–19	Sacramento	38	0	11.4	.420	.219	.684	1.1	2.2	.4	.1	5.1
2019–20	Milwaukee	9	0	13.1	**.451**	.286	.588	2.1	**3.2**	.6	.1	6.9
2020–21	Orlando	4	1	**19.8**	.375	**.400**	.714	**3.0**	3.0	.0	.0	6.3
Career		103	3	15.7	.396	.301	.755	2.0	2.6	.5	.1	6.7

=== Playoffs ===
Year	Team	GP	GS	MPG	FG%	3P%	FT%	RPG	APG	SPG	BPG	PPG
2020	Milwaukee	2	0	1.0	—	—	—	.0	0.5	.0	.0	.0
Career		2	0	1.0	—	—	—	.0	0.5	.0	.0	.0

=== College ===
Year	Team	GP	GS	MPG	FG%	3P%	FT%	RPG	APG	SPG	BPG	PPG
2013–14	Kansas	35	3	16.1	.417	.327	.662	1.3	2.1	.5	.0	5.5
2014–15	Kansas	36	36	33.5	.441	.429	.786	3.9	3.9	**1.4**	**.1**	12.6
2015–16	Kansas	**38**	**38**	33.5	.434	.381	.739	**4.3**	4.6	1.3	**.1**	12.9
2016–17	Kansas	36	36	**36.1**	**.490**	**.471**	**.794**	4.2	**5.2**	1.3	**.1**	**20.9**
Career		145	113	30.0	.454	.420	.761	3.4	4.0	1.1	.1	13.0
