= 2017–18 Los Angeles Lakers season =

NBA professional basketball team season

- Head coach: Luke Walton
- General manager: Rob Pelinka
- Owners: Jerry Buss family trust (primary owner being Jeanie Buss as of March 27, 2017)
- Arena: Staples Center

Results
- Record: 35–47 (.427)
- Place: Division: 3rd (Pacific); Conference: 11th (Western)
- Playoff finish: Did not qualify
- Stats at Basketball Reference

Local media
- Television: Spectrum SportsNet and Spectrum Deportes
- Radio: 710 ESPN (English); 1020 Radio AM (Spanish)

The 2017–18 Los Angeles Lakers season was the franchise's 70th season, its 69th season in the National Basketball Association (NBA), and its 58th in Los Angeles.

On December 18, 2017, against the Golden State Warriors, the Lakers retired the numbers 8 and 24 of former shooting guard Kobe Bryant, making him the first NBA player to have two numbers retired on the same team.

== Draft ==
Round	Pick	Player	Position	Nationality	College
1	2	Lonzo Ball	PG	United States	UCLA
1	28	Tony Bradley	PF/C	United States	North Carolina

Originally, the Lakers were at risk of losing their own first-round pick this year to the Philadelphia 76ers due to the stipulations of a previous trade involving Steve Nash and the Phoenix Suns and having less than 50% odds of keeping the pick despite having the third-worst record that season. However, they not only kept the pick, but also moved up a spot in the process. The Lakers will ultimately lose their first-round pick for the 2018 NBA draft, regardless of whether it goes to the 76ers or the Boston Celtics later on, but they will at least keep their first-round pick for the 2019 NBA draft as opposed to giving it to the Orlando Magic as a result of their Dwight Howard trade around the same period. Their original second first-round pick at #28, however, came from the Houston Rockets as an incentive to trade away Lou Williams in exchange for Corey Brewer. On June 20, two days before the draft began, the Lakers would acquire a new first-round pick by getting the worst of the Brooklyn Nets' first-round picks at #27 alongside their star center Brook Lopez in a trade in exchange for star combo guard D'Angelo Russell and Russian center Timofey Mozgov. On draft night, though, the Lakers acquired two more picks in the draft by trading their weakest first-round pick (which became power forward/center Tony Bradley from the most recent NCAA Champions in University of North Carolina) to the Utah Jazz for Picks #30 & 42 in this year's draft.

With the 2nd pick of the draft, the Lakers selected their hometown star Lonzo Ball, who played point guard during his sole season at UCLA. During that time there, Ball averaged a league-leading 7.6 assists to go with 14.6 points, 6.0 rebounds, 1.8 steals, and 0.8 blocks per game in 36 total games there. He also earned the Wayman Tisdale Award, the Pac-12 Freshman of The Year Award, First Team All-Pac-12 Honors, and consensus First-Team All-American Honors in the process. Next up, with the pick they acquired from the Brooklyn Nets, the Lakers took power forward Kyle Kuzma from the University of Utah. In Kuzma's final year at Utah, he joined Ball in being a member of the All-Pac-12 First Team by averaging 16.4 points, 9.3 rebounds, and 2.4 assists as a junior. With their last pick in the first round of the draft, the Lakers selected senior shooting guard Josh Hart from Villanova University. Throughout his time there (which included an NCAA Championship in his junior season), Hart averaged 13.1 points, 5.5 rebounds, and 1.8 assists per game at Villanova while earning plenty of awards in each of his last three seasons there. The Lakers ended their draft night by taking sophomore power forward/center Thomas Bryant from Indiana University. In his time at Indiana, Bryant averaged 12.2 points, 6.2 rebounds, 1.2 blocks, and nearly an assist per game throughout his college career. He made the Big 10 Conference's Freshman Team and the All-Big 10 Third Team Honors in his first season there.

== Roster ==
2017–18 Los Angeles Lakers roster
Players

Pos.	No.	Player	Height	Weight	DOB	From
PG	2	Lonzo Ball	6 ft 6 in (1.98 m)	190 lb (86 kg)	1997–10–27	UCLA
C	31	Thomas Bryant	6 ft 10 in (2.08 m)	248 lb (112 kg)	1997–07–31	Indiana
SG	1	Kentavious Caldwell-Pope	6 ft 5 in (1.96 m)	205 lb (93 kg)	1993–02–18	Georgia
SG	4	Alex Caruso (TW)	6 ft 5 in (1.96 m)	186 lb (84 kg)	1994–02–28	Texas A&M
SF	9	Luol Deng	6 ft 9 in (2.06 m)	220 lb (100 kg)	1985–04–16	Duke
PG	10	Tyler Ennis	6 ft 3 in (1.91 m)	194 lb (88 kg)	1994–08–24	Syracuse
PF	12	Channing Frye	6 ft 11 in (2.11 m)	255 lb (116 kg)	1983–05–17	Arizona
SG	5	Josh Hart	6 ft 5 in (1.96 m)	215 lb (98 kg)	1995–03–06	Villanova
SG	20	Andre Ingram	6 ft 3 in (1.91 m)	190 lb (86 kg)	1985–11–19	American
G/F	14	Brandon Ingram	6 ft 9 in (2.06 m)	190 lb (86 kg)	1997–09–02	Duke
SF	0	Kyle Kuzma	6 ft 9 in (2.06 m)	220 lb (100 kg)	1995–07–24	Utah
C	11	Brook Lopez	7 ft 0 in (2.13 m)	268 lb (122 kg)	1988–04–01	Stanford
PG	23	Gary Payton II (TW)	6 ft 3 in (1.91 m)	190 lb (86 kg)	1992–12–01	Oregon State
PF/C	30	Julius Randle	6 ft 9 in (2.06 m)	250 lb (113 kg)	1994–11–29	Kentucky
PG	3	Isaiah Thomas	5 ft 9 in (1.75 m)	185 lb (84 kg)	1989–02–07	Washington
PF	21	Travis Wear	6 ft 10 in (2.08 m)	225 lb (102 kg)	1990–09–21	UCLA
C	40	Ivica Zubac	7 ft 1 in (2.16 m)	240 lb (109 kg)	1997–03–18	Croatia

Coaches
Head coach
- Luke Walton
Assistant(s)
- Jud Buechler
- Mark Madsen
- Jesse Mermuys
- Miles Simon
- Brian Shaw (Associate HC)
- Brian Keefe (assistant coach/player development)
- Clay Moser (assistant coach/basketball strategy)
- Tracy Murray (assistant coach/shooting consultant)
- Casey Owens (assistant coach/advance professional scout)

Legend
- (DP) Unsigned draft pick
- (FA) Free agent
- (S) Suspended
- (GL) On assignment to G League affiliate
- (TW) Two-way affiliate player
- Injured

Roster
Updated: 2018–04–05

== Standings ==
=== Division ===
Pacific Division	W	L	PCT	GB	Home	Road	Div	GP
y – Golden State Warriors	58	24	.707	–	29‍–‍12	29‍–‍12	13–3	82
Los Angeles Clippers	42	40	.512	16.0	22‍–‍19	20‍–‍21	12–4	82
Los Angeles Lakers	35	47	.427	23.0	20‍–‍21	15‍–‍26	6–10	82
Sacramento Kings	27	55	.329	31.0	14‍–‍27	13‍–‍28	5–11	82
Phoenix Suns	21	61	.256	37.0	10‍–‍31	11‍–‍30	4–12	82

=== Conference ===
Western Conference
#	Team	W	L	PCT	GB	GP
1	z – Houston Rockets *	65	17	.793	–	82
2	y – Golden State Warriors *	58	24	.707	7.0	82
3	y – Portland Trail Blazers *	49	33	.598	16.0	82
4	x – Oklahoma City Thunder	48	34	.585	17.0	82
5	x – Utah Jazz	48	34	.585	17.0	82
6	x – New Orleans Pelicans	48	34	.585	17.0	82
7	x – San Antonio Spurs	47	35	.573	18.0	82
8	x – Minnesota Timberwolves	47	35	.573	18.0	82
9	Denver Nuggets	46	36	.561	19.0	82
10	Los Angeles Clippers	42	40	.512	23.0	82
11	Los Angeles Lakers	35	47	.427	30.0	82
12	Sacramento Kings	27	55	.329	38.0	82
13	Dallas Mavericks	24	58	.293	41.0	82
14	Memphis Grizzlies	22	60	.268	43.0	82
15	Phoenix Suns	21	61	.256	44.0	82

== Game log ==
=== Preseason ===
2017 pre-season game log
Total: 2–4 (Home: 1–2; Road: 1–2)
Pre-season: 2–4 (home: 1–2; road: 1–2)

Game	Date	Team	Score	High points	High rebounds	High assists	Location Attendance	Record
1	September 30	Minnesota	L 99–108	Kyle Kuzma (19)	Larry Nance Jr. (9)	Ball, Ennis (8)	Honda Center; 18,000	0–1
2	October 2	Denver	L 107–113	Kyle Kuzma (23)	Julius Randle (10)	four players (4)	Staples Center; 17,218	0–2
3	October 4	Denver	L 104–122	Jordan Clarkson (24)	Julius Randle (6)	Briante Weber (5)	Citizens Business Bank Arena; 17,000	0–3
4	October 8	Sacramento	W 75–69	Julius Randle (17)	Julius Randle (10)	Alex Caruso (5)	T-Mobile Arena; 13,094	1–3
5	October 10	Utah	L 99–105	Clarkson, Kuzma (18)	Alex Caruso (6)	Alex Caruso (10)	Staples Center; 15,054	1–4
6	October 13	@ LA Clippers	W 111–104	Brook Lopez (16)	Nance Jr., Randle (7)	Ingram, Kuzma, Caldwell-Pope (5)	Staples Center; 16,711	2–4

2017–18 season schedule

=== Regular season ===
2017–18 game log
Total: 35–47 (Home: 20–21; Road: 15–26)
October: 3–4 (home: 2–3; road: 1–1)

Game	Date	Team	Score	High points	High rebounds	High assists	Location Attendance	Record
1	October 19	L.A. Clippers	L 92–108	Brook Lopez (20)	Larry Nance Jr. (12)	Ball, Ingram (4)	Staples Center; 18,997	0–1
2	October 20	@ Phoenix	W 132–130	Lonzo Ball (29)	Ball, Lopez (11)	Lonzo Ball (9)	Talking Stick Resort Arena; 18,055	1–1
3	October 22	New Orleans	L 112–119	Jordan Clarkson (24)	Lonzo Ball (8)	Lonzo Ball (13)	Staples Center; 18,997	1–2
4	October 25	Washington	W 102–99 (OT)	Brandon Ingram (19)	Ingram, Nance Jr. (10)	Lonzo Ball (10)	Staples Center; 18,996	2–2
5	October 27	Toronto	L 92–101	Julius Randle (18)	Kyle Kuzma (10)	Lonzo Ball (6)	Staples Center; 17,876	2–3
6	October 28	@ Utah	L 81–96	Brandon Ingram (16)	Larry Nance Jr. (10)	Lonzo Ball (4)	Vivint Smart Home Arena; 18,306	2–4
7	October 31	Detroit	W 113–93	Julius Randle (17)	Larry Nance Jr. (12)	Brandon Ingram (6)	Staples Center; 17,569	3–4

November : 5–9 (home: 4–3; road: 1–6)

Game	Date	Team	Score	High points	High rebounds	High assists	Location Attendance	Record
8	November 2	@ Portland	L 110–113	Brook Lopez (27)	Julius Randle (6)	Ball, Clarkson (4)	Moda Center; 19,469	3–5
9	November 3	Brooklyn	W 124–112	Brook Lopez (34)	Kyle Kuzma (13)	Lonzo Ball (7)	Staples Center; 18,997	4–5
10	November 5	Memphis	W 107–102	Brook Lopez (21)	Kyle Kuzma (12)	Lonzo Ball (9)	Staples Center; 18,997	5–5
11	November 8	@ Boston	L 96–107	Jordan Clarkson (18)	Julius Randle (12)	Lonzo Ball (6)	TD Garden; 18,624	5–6
12	November 9	@ Washington	L 95–111	Lopez, Clarkson (15)	Kyle Kuzma (9)	Lonzo Ball (8)	Capital One Arena; 20,173	5–7
13	November 11	@ Milwaukee	L 90–98	Kyle Kuzma (21)	Lonzo Ball (12)	Lonzo Ball (13)	BMO Harris Bradley Center; 18,717	5–8
14	November 13	@ Phoenix	W 100–93	Jordan Clarkson (25)	Brook Lopez (10)	Lonzo Ball (5)	Talking Stick Resort Arena; 17,533	6–8
15	November 15	Philadelphia	L 109–115	Brandon Ingram (26)	Brandon Ingram (11)	Jordan Clarkson (5)	Staples Center; 18,997	6–9
16	November 17	Phoenix	L 113–122	Kyle Kuzma (30)	Kuzma, Lopez (10)	Lonzo Ball (6)	Staples Center; 18,997	6–10
17	November 19	Denver	W 127–109	Julius Randle (24)	Lonzo Ball (16)	Lonzo Ball (11)	Staples Center; 18,997	7–10
18	November 21	Chicago	W 103–94	Kyle Kuzma (22)	Lonzo Ball (13)	Ingram, Kuzma (5)	Staples Center; 18,997	8–10
19	November 22	@ Sacramento	L 102–113	Kentavious Caldwell-Pope (20)	Julius Randle (8)	Lonzo Ball (11)	Golden 1 Center; 17,583	8–11
20	November 27	@ L.A. Clippers	L 115–120	Kentavious Caldwell-Pope (29)	Clarkson, Nance Jr. (8)	Lonzo Ball (7)	Staples Center; 18,086	8–12
21	November 29	Golden State	L 123–127 (OT)	Brandon Ingram (32)	Kentavious Caldwell-Pope (7)	Lonzo Ball (10)	Staples Center; 18,997	8–13

December : 3–11 (home: 0–6; road: 3–5)

Game	Date	Team	Score	High points	High rebounds	High assists	Location Attendance	Record
22	December 2	@ Denver	L 100–115	Brandon Ingram (20)	Kyle Kuzma (10)	Lonzo Ball (5)	Pepsi Center; 19,520	8–14
23	December 3	Houston	L 95–118	Kyle Kuzma (22)	Kyle Kuzma (12)	Brandon Ingram (5)	Staples Center; 18,997	8–15
24	December 7	@ Philadelphia	W 107–104	Brandon Ingram (21)	Lonzo Ball (8)	Lonzo Ball (8)	Wells Fargo Center; 20,495	9–15
25	December 9	@ Charlotte	W 110–99	Jordan Clarkson (22)	Kyle Kuzma (14)	Lonzo Ball (9)	Spectrum Center; 19,320	10–15
26	December 12	@ New York	L 109–113 (OT)	Kentavious Caldwell-Pope (24)	Larry Nance Jr. (9)	Lonzo Ball (6)	Madison Square Garden; 19,359	10–16
27	December 14	@ Cleveland	L 112–121	Brandon Ingram (26)	Larry Nance Jr. (12)	Lonzo Ball (11)	Quicken Loans Arena; 20,562	10–17
28	December 18	Golden State	L 114–116 (OT)	Kyle Kuzma (25)	Julius Randle (11)	Lonzo Ball (6)	Staples Center; 18,997	10–18
29	December 20	@ Houston	W 122–116	Kyle Kuzma (38)	Ball, Nance Jr. (9)	Brandon Ingram (6)	Toyota Center; 18,055	11–18
30	December 22	@ Golden State	L 106–113	Kyle Kuzma (27)	Kyle Kuzma (14)	Lonzo Ball (5)	Oracle Arena; 19,596	11–19
31	December 23	Portland	L 92–95	Clarkson, Kuzma (18)	Josh Hart (10)	Lonzo Ball (11)	Staples Center; 18,997	11–20
32	December 25	Minnesota	L 104–121	Kyle Kuzma (31)	Julius Randle (7)	Jordan Clarkson (7)	Staples Center; 18,997	11–21
33	December 27	Memphis	L 99–109	Brandon Ingram (23)	Larry Nance Jr. (9)	Brandon Ingram (4)	Staples Center; 18,997	11–22
34	December 29	L.A. Clippers	L 106–121	Jordan Clarkson (20)	Caldwell-Pope, Randle (7)	Jordan Clarkson (8)	Staples Center; 18,997	11–23
35	December 31	@ Houston	L 142–148 (2OT)	Julius Randle (29)	Julius Randle (15)	Tyler Ennis (11)	Toyota Center; 18,179	11–24

January : 8–7 (home: 6–2; road: 2–5)

Game	Date	Team	Score	High points	High rebounds	High assists	Location Attendance	Record
36	January 1	@ Minnesota	L 96–114	Jordan Clarkson (20)	Julius Randle (12)	Clarkson, Ennis (4)	Target Center; 18,978	11–25
37	January 3	Oklahoma City	L 96–133	Kyle Kuzma (18)	Larry Nance Jr. (7)	Tyler Ennis (6)	Staples Center; 18,997	11–26
38	January 5	Charlotte	L 94–108	Brandon Ingram (22)	Brandon Ingram (14)	Lonzo Ball (5)	Staples Center; 18,997	11–27
39	January 7	Atlanta	W 132–113	Brandon Ingram (20)	Lonzo Ball (10)	Brandon Ingram (7)	Staples Center; 18,997	12–27
40	January 9	Sacramento	W 99–86	Julius Randle (22)	Julius Randle (14)	Lonzo Ball (11)	Staples Center; 18,997	13–27
41	January 11	San Antonio	W 93–81	Brandon Ingram (26)	Lonzo Ball (10)	Lonzo Ball (6)	Staples Center; 18,997	14–27
42	January 13	@ Dallas	W 107–101 (OT)	Julius Randle (23)	Julius Randle (15)	Lonzo Ball (7)	American Airlines Center; 20,209	15–27
43	January 15	@ Memphis	L 114–123	Kentavious Caldwell-Pope (27)	Larry Nance Jr. (11)	Kyle Kuzma (5)	FedExForum; 17,794	15–28
44	January 17	@ Oklahoma City	L 90–114	Julius Randle (16)	Larry Nance Jr. (6)	Clarkson, Ennis, Ingram, Randle (3)	Chesapeake Energy Arena; 18,203	15–29
45	January 19	Indiana	W 99–86	Jordan Clarkson (33)	Larry Nance Jr. (11)	Jordan Clarkson (7)	Staples Center; 18,997	16–29
46	January 21	New York	W 127–107	Jordan Clarkson (29)	Julius Randle (12)	Jordan Clarkson (10)	Staples Center; 18,997	17–29
47	January 23	Boston	W 108–107	Kyle Kuzma (28)	Julius Randle (14)	Clarkson, Ingram (4)	Staples Center; 18,997	18–29
48	January 26	@ Chicago	W 108–103	Brandon Ingram (25)	Brandon Ingram (9)	Brandon Ingram (5)	United Center; 21,827	19–29
49	January 28	@ Toronto	L 111–123	Clarkson, Randle (17)	Julius Randle (10)	Caruso, Randle (5)	Air Canada Centre; 19,800	19–30
50	January 31	@ Orlando	L 105–127	Clarkson, Randle (20)	Julius Randle (9)	Brandon Ingram (5)	Amway Center; 18,553	19–31

February : 7–3 (home: 3–0; road: 4–3)

Game	Date	Team	Score	High points	High rebounds	High assists	Location Attendance	Record
51	February 2	@ Brooklyn	W 102–99	Lopez, Randle (19)	Josh Hart (14)	Brandon Ingram (10)	Barclays Center; 17,732	20–31
52	February 4	@ Oklahoma City	W 108–104	Brook Lopez (20)	Josh Hart (11)	Lopez, Ingram (5)	Chesapeake Energy Arena; 18,203	21–31
53	February 6	Phoenix	W 112–93	Brandon Ingram (26)	Josh Hart (11)	Clarkson, Ingram, Randle (5)	Staples Center; 18,997	22–31
54	February 8	Oklahoma City	W 106–81	Kentavious Caldwell-Pope (20)	Brook Lopez (9)	Brandon Ingram (6)	Staples Center; 18,997	23–31
55	February 10	@ Dallas	L 123–130	Julius Randle (26)	Kyle Kuzma (15)	Julius Randle (7)	American Airlines Center; 20,162	23–32
56	February 14	@ New Orleans	L 117–139	Kyle Kuzma (23)	Kentavious Caldwell-Pope (8)	Kentavious Caldwell-Pope (8)	Smoothie King Center; 15,436	23–33
57	February 15	@ Minnesota	L 111–119	Julius Randle (23)	Caldwell-Pope, Zubac (11)	Kentavious Caldwell-Pope (6)	Target Center; 17,534	23–34
58	February 23	Dallas	W 124–102	Julius Randle (18)	Julius Randle (13)	Julius Randle (10)	Staples Center; 18,997	24–34
59	February 24	@ Sacramento	W 113–108	Kentavious Caldwell-Pope (34)	Julius Randle (13)	Brandon Ingram (8)	Golden 1 Center; 17,583	25–34
60	February 26	@ Atlanta	W 123–104	Brandon Ingram (21)	Kentavious Caldwell-Pope (14)	Brandon Ingram (6)	Philips Arena; 16,328	26–34

March : 7–8 (home: 4–3; road: 3–5)

Game	Date	Team	Score	High points	High rebounds	High assists	Location Attendance	Record
61	March 1	@ Miami	W 131–113	Isaiah Thomas (29)	Randle, Ball, Kuzma (6)	Lonzo Ball (7)	American Airlines Arena; 19,600	27–34
62	March 3	@ San Antonio	W 116–112	Julius Randle (25)	Kentavious Caldwell-Pope (13)	Lonzo Ball (11)	AT&T Center; 18,557	28–34
63	March 5	Portland	L 103–108	Julius Randle (21)	Julius Randle (9)	Isaiah Thomas (7)	Staples Center; 18,997	28–35
64	March 7	Orlando	W 108–107	Brook Lopez (27)	Julius Randle (11)	Isaiah Thomas (9)	Staples Center; 18,997	29–35
65	March 9	@ Denver	L 116–125	Brook Lopez (29)	Kentavious Caldwell-Pope (9)	Lonzo Ball (8)	Pepsi Center; 19,807	29–36
66	March 11	Cleveland	W 127–113	Julius Randle (36)	Julius Randle (14)	Isaiah Thomas (9)	Staples Center; 18,997	30–36
67	March 13	Denver	W 112–103	Randle, Kuzma (26)	Randle, Kuzma (13)	Lonzo Ball (8)	Staples Center; 18,997	31–36
68	March 14	@ Golden State	L 106–117	Julius Randle (22)	Julius Randle (10)	Lonzo Ball (11)	Oracle Arena; 19,596	31–37
69	March 16	Miami	L 91–92	Julius Randle (25)	Julius Randle (12)	Lonzo Ball (8)	Staples Center; 18,997	31–38
70	March 19	@ Indiana	L 100–110	Kyle Kuzma (27)	Julius Randle (9)	Lonzo Ball (8)	Bankers Life Fieldhouse; 16,603	31–39
71	March 22	@ New Orleans	L 125–128	Kentavious Caldwell-Pope (28)	Lonzo Ball (13)	Lonzo Ball (9)	Smoothie King Center; 18,037	31–40
72	March 24	@ Memphis	W 100–93	Kyle Kuzma (25)	Julius Randle (11)	Lonzo Ball (10)	FedExForum; 18,119	32–40
73	March 26	@ Detroit	L 106–112	Julius Randle (23)	Randle, Kuzma (11)	Lonzo Ball (11)	Little Caesars Arena; 18,718	32–41
74	March 28	Dallas	W 103–93	Brook Lopez (22)	Julius Randle (10)	Lonzo Ball (11)	Staples Center; 18,997	33–41
75	March 30	Milwaukee	L 122–124 (OT)	Kyle Kuzma (27)	Josh Hart (13)	Caruso, Ingram, Kuzma (6)	Staples Center; 18,997	33–42

April : 2–5 (home: 1–4; road: 1–1)

Game	Date	Team	Score	High points	High rebounds	High assists	Location Attendance	Record
76	April 1	Sacramento	L 83–84	Julius Randle (19)	Ivica Zubac (10)	Ennis, Hart (4)	Staples Center; 18,997	33–43
77	April 3	@ Utah	L 110–117	Kentavious Caldwell-Pope (28)	Julius Randle (12)	Julius Randle (9)	Vivint Smart Home Arena; 18,306	33–44
78	April 4	San Antonio	W 122–112 (OT)	Kyle Kuzma (30)	Josh Hart (10)	Tyler Ennis (7)	Staples Center; 18,997	34–44
79	April 6	Minnesota	L 96–113	Hart, Randle (20)	Josh Hart (11)	Ennis, Payton II (4)	Staples Center; 18,997	34–45
80	April 8	Utah	L 97–112	Josh Hart (25)	Julius Randle (7)	Julius Randle (4)	Staples Center; 18,997	34–46
81	April 10	Houston	L 99–105	Josh Hart (20)	Julius Randle (8)	Alex Caruso (6)	Staples Center; 18,997	34–47
82	April 11	@ L.A. Clippers	W 115–100	Josh Hart (30)	Gary Payton II (12)	Andre Ingram (6)	Staples Center; 19,068	35–47

2017–18 season schedule

== Player statistics ==
Legend
GP	Games played	GS	Games started	MPG	Minutes per game
FG%	Field-goal percentage	3P%	3-point field-goal percentage	FT%	Free-throw percentage
RPG	Rebounds per game	APG	Assists per game	SPG	Steals per game
BPG	Blocks per game	PPG	Points per game

=== Regular season ===
Los Angeles Lakers statistics
Player	GP	GS	MPG	FG%	3P%	FT%	RPG	APG	SPG	BPG	PPG
Julius Randle	82	49	26.7	.558	.222	.718	8.0	2.6	.5	.5	16.1
Kyle Kuzma	77	37	31.2	.450	.366	.707	6.3	1.8	.6	.4	16.1
Kentavious Caldwell-Pope	74	74	33.2	.426	.383	.789	5.2	2.2	1.4	.2	13.4
Brook Lopez	74	72	23.4	.465	.345	.703	4.0	1.7	.4	1.3	13.0
Josh Hart	63	23	23.2	.469	.396	.702	4.2	1.3	.7	.3	7.9
Brandon Ingram	59	59	33.5	.470	.390	.681	5.3	3.9	.8	.7	16.1
Tyler Ennis	54	11	12.6	.420	.250	.759	1.8	1.9	.6	.2	4.1
Corey Brewer^{†}	54	2	12.9	.453	.186	.667	1.7	.8	.8	.1	3.7
Jordan Clarkson^{†}	53	2	23.7	.448	.324	.795	3.0	3.3	.7	.1	14.5
Lonzo Ball	52	50	34.2	.360	.305	.451	6.9	7.2	1.7	.8	10.2
Ivica Zubac	43	0	9.5	.500	.000	.765	2.9	.6	.2	.3	3.7
Larry Nance Jr.^{†}	42	17	22.0	.601	.250	.632	6.8	1.4	1.4	.5	8.6
Alex Caruso	37	7	15.2	.431	.302	.700	1.8	2.0	.6	.3	3.6
Andrew Bogut	24	5	9.0	.680		1.000	3.3	.6	.2	.5	1.5
Isaiah Thomas^{†}	17	1	26.8	.383	.327	.921	2.1	5.0	.4	.1	15.6
Travis Wear	17	0	13.4	.347	.362	1.000	2.2	.4	.2	.3	4.4
Thomas Bryant	15	0	4.8	.381	.100	.556	1.1	.4	.1	.1	1.5
Gary Payton II^{†}	11	0	10.5	.415	.308	.167	2.5	1.1	.4	.2	3.5
Channing Frye^{†}	9	0	16.7	.465	.360	.750	2.8	1.1	.1	.1	5.8
Vander Blue	5	0	9.0	.200	.000	.500	.2	.6	.2	.0	.6
Andre Ingram	2	0	32.0	.471	.556	1.000	3.0	3.5	1.5	1.5	12.0
Nigel Hayes-Davis^{†}	2	0	5.5	.333	.000	1.000	.0	1.0	.0	.0	1.5
Derrick Williams	2	0	4.5	.250	.000		.5	.0	.0	.0	1.0
Luol Deng	1	1	13.0	.500			.0	1.0	1.0	.0	2.0

- ^{†} Denotes player spent time with another team in the season. Stats reflect time with the Lakers only.

== Transactions ==
=== Trades ===
June 22, 2017	To Los Angeles Lakers Brook Lopez; Draft rights to Kyle Kuzma	To Brooklyn Nets D'Angelo Russell; Timofey Mozgov
June 22, 2017	To Los Angeles Lakers Draft rights to Josh Hart; Draft rights to Thomas Bryant	To Utah Jazz Draft rights to Tony Bradley
February 8, 2018	To Los Angeles Lakers Protected 1st-round draft pick 2018 NBA draft Isaiah Thomas; Channing Frye	To Cleveland Cavaliers Jordan Clarkson; Larry Nance Jr.

=== Free agency ===
==== Re-signed ====
Player	Signed
Tyler Ennis	2-year contract worth $3.1 million

==== Additions ====
Player	Signed	Former Team
Kentavious Caldwell-Pope	1-year contract worth $18 million	Detroit Pistons
Alex Caruso	Two-way contract	Oklahoma City Blue
Vander Blue	Two-way contract	Los Angeles D-Fenders
Andrew Bogut	1-year contract worth $2.3 million	Cleveland Cavaliers
Gary Payton II	Two-way contract	Milwaukee Bucks / Wisconsin Herd
Nigel Hayes	10-day contract	Westchester Knicks
Andre Ingram	10-day contract	South Bay Lakers

==== Subtractions ====
Player	Reason left	New Team
Tarik Black	Waived	Houston Rockets
Nick Young	1-year contract worth $5.2 million	Golden State Warriors
David Nwaba	Waived	Chicago Bulls
Metta World Peace	Unrestricted free agent	New Orleans Gators / Retired
Thomas Robinson	Unrestricted free agent	(Russia) BC Khimki
Andrew Bogut	Waived	
Vander Blue	Waived	(Italy) Auxilium Pallacanestro Torino
Nigel Hayes	10-day contract expired	Westchester Knicks
