= Willie Cauley-Stein =

American basketball player (born 1993)

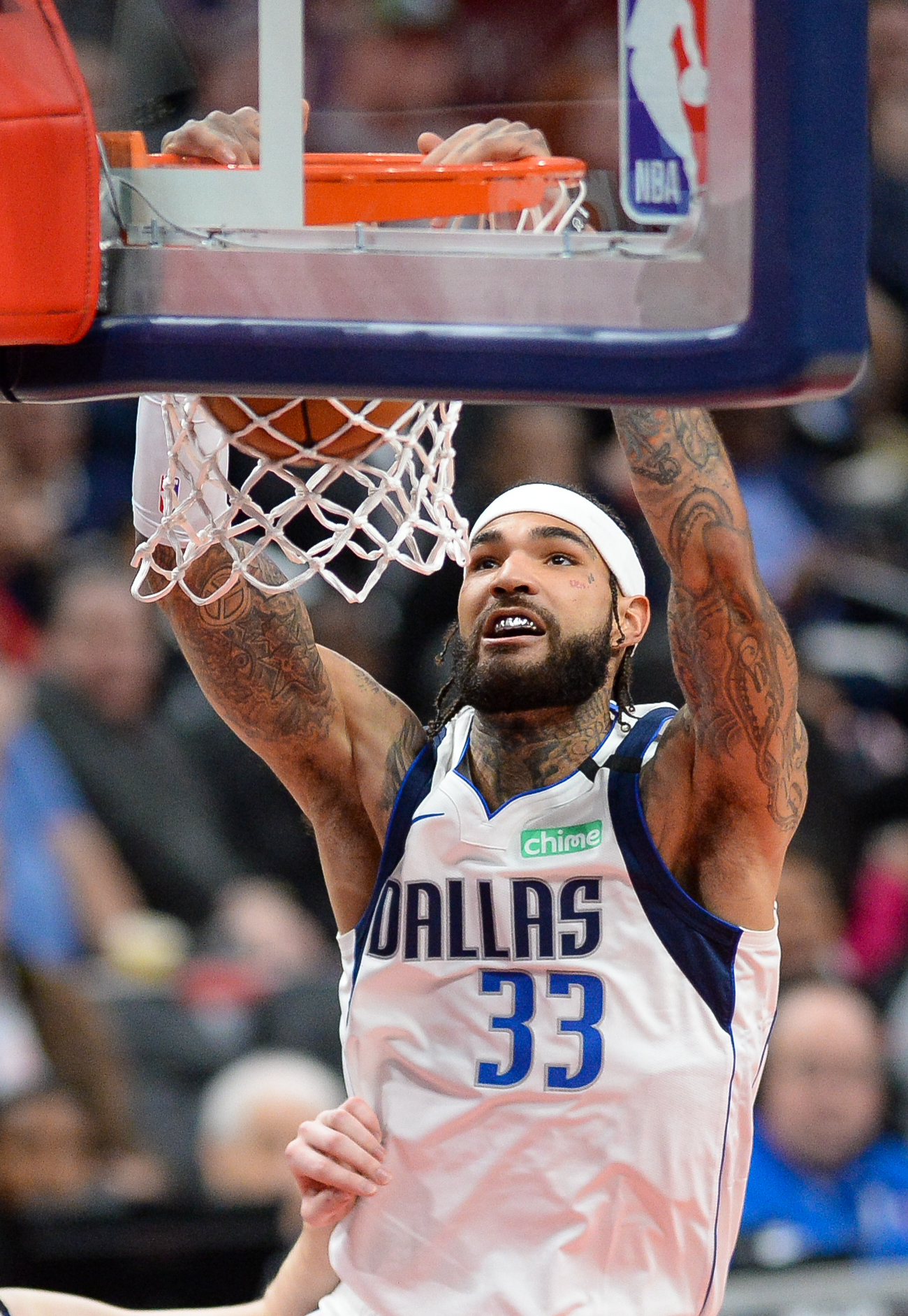
- Cauley-Stein with the Dallas Mavericks in 2020

Personal information
- Born: August 18, 1993 (age 33) Spearville, Kansas, U.S.
- Listed height: 7 ft 0 in (2.13 m)
- Listed weight: 240 lb (109 kg)

Career information
- High school: Olathe Northwest (Olathe, Kansas)
- College: Kentucky (2012–2015)
- NBA draft: 2015: 1st round, 6th overall pick
- Drafted by: Sacramento Kings
- Playing career: 2015–2024
- Position: Center
- Number: 00, 2, 33, 15

Career history
- 2015–2019: Sacramento Kings
- 2019–2020: Golden State Warriors
- 2020–2022: Dallas Mavericks
- 2022: Philadelphia 76ers
- 2022–2023: Rio Grande Valley Vipers
- 2023–2024: Openjobmetis Varese
- 2024: Nanjing Monkey Kings

Career highlights
- NBA All-Rookie Second Team (2016); Consensus first-team All-American (2015); NABC Defensive Player of the Year (2015); SEC Defensive Player of the Year (2015); First-team All-SEC (2015); 2× SEC All-Defensive Team (2014, 2015); SEC All-Freshman team (2013)
- Stats at NBA.com
- Stats at Basketball Reference

Willie Trill Cauley-Stein (born Willie Durmond Cauley Jr.; August 18, 1993) is an American former professional basketball player. He played college basketball with the Kentucky Wildcats.

== Early life ==
He was born and raised in Spearville, Kansas, population 791. His mother, Marlene Stein, and his father, Willie Cauley, met shortly after high school and never married, and his father left the family shortly after his birth. His maternal grandparents, Norma and Val Stein, helped raise him, and he legally changed his surname from Cauley to Cauley-Stein.

== High school career ==
As a high school freshman, he was 6 feet 8 inches (2.03 m). As a sophomore he transferred to Olathe Northwest High School in Olathe, Kansas, where he played basketball and football. As a junior, he averaged 15.8 points and 8.5 rebounds per game.

Considered a four-star basketball recruit by Rivals.com, Cauley-Stein was listed as the No. 9 center and the No. 40 player in the nation in 2012.

Cauley-Stein was not eligible to play varsity football until his senior year, but he was convinced to play wide receiver when he did. In 2011, he helped his high school win a 7-on-7 football tournament at the University of Kansas and was offered a football scholarship on the spot. In his senior season, Cauley-Stein averaged 19.7 yards per catch while sometimes playing as cornerback. He finished with 64 catches for 1,265 yards and 15 touchdowns.

== College career ==
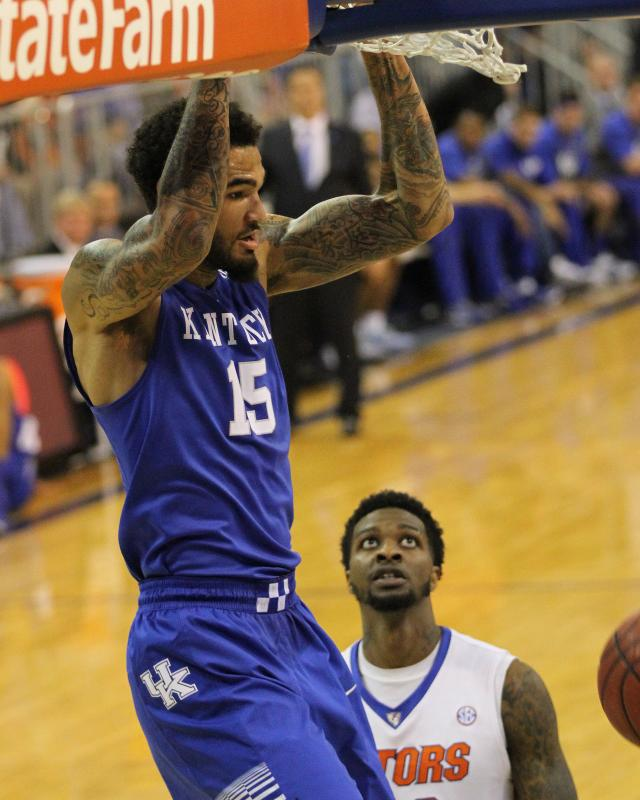
Cauley-Stein dunks against the Florida Gators his junior season.

=== Freshman season ===
Cauley-Stein started out his college career as a bench center, backing up top prospect Nerlens Noel. During his time as a back-up, Cauley-Stein ended up averaging 7.8 points on 63.9% field goal shooting, 5.5 rebounds, 1.7 blocks, 1.0 assists, and 0.8 steals in 20 games of play.

Cauley-Stein earned SEC Freshman of the Week honors twice. Cauley-Stein's season high came against Vanderbilt as he posted 20 points to go with seven rebounds. A couple of weeks prior, he was a perfect 5-of-5 from the field against Auburn.

On February 12, 2013, in a game against Florida, Noel tore the ACL in his left knee after blocking a lay-up, forcing him to sit out the remainder of the season. Cauley-Stein was given the starting center position due to Noel's season-ending injury. In Noel's absence, he recorded three double-doubles in six games including 10 points and 11 rebounds against Georgia in addition to 13 points, 10 rebounds, and four blocks at Arkansas

After SEC play ended he was named to the All-SEC Freshman team. At the end of the season he averaged 8.3 points and 6.2 rebounds per game after appearing in 29 games while making 14 starts.

=== Sophomore season ===
During the 2013–14 season, he appeared in 37 games, making 18 starts while averaging 6.8 points, 6.1 rebounds, and 2.9 blocks per game. His tallied 106 blocks for the season is a total that ranks as the second most in a single season in school history.

His terrific sophomore season led to him being named to the All-SEC Defensive Team. He recorded a career-high nine blocks twice during the season against Providence and Boise State. He really started coming into his own towards the end of the season. In the SEC tournament, he recorded 10 points, 11 rebounds, and five blocks versus #1 Florida in the SEC championship game.

Due to an injury to his leg suffered during the 2014 NCAA tournament in a game against Louisville, Cauley-Stein missed the remainder of the season. He decided to return for his junior season due to his injury; he was a projected top-15 pick in the 2014 NBA draft prior to his injury.

=== Junior season ===
In 2014–15, Cauley-Stein was named the SEC Defensive Player of the Year. He was also selected to the All-SEC First Team, the All-SEC Defensive Team and the USA Today first-team All-American Team.

On April 9, 2015, Cauley-Stein, and teammates Andrew Harrison, Aaron Harrison, Dakari Johnson, Devin Booker, Trey Lyles, and Karl-Anthony Towns, all declared to enter their names into the NBA draft.

== Professional career ==
=== Sacramento Kings (2015–2019) ===
On June 25, 2015, Cauley-Stein was selected by the Sacramento Kings with the sixth overall pick in the 2015 NBA draft. On July 16, he signed with the Kings. He made his debut for the Kings in their season opener on October 28, recording two points and two rebounds in a 111–104 loss to the Los Angeles Clippers. He made his first career start two days later and recorded 17 points and nine rebounds in a 132–114 win over the Los Angeles Lakers. Cauley-Stein missed most of December with a right index finger injury. On January 20, he recorded his first career double-double with 12 points and 10 rebounds in a 112–93 win over the Lakers. On March 25, he scored a then career-high 26 points in a 116–94 win over the Phoenix Suns. At the season's end, he earned NBA All-Rookie Second Team honors.

On February 23, 2017, following the DeMarcus Cousins trade, Cauley-Stein was given extended minutes off the bench and came through with a career-high 29 points and 10 rebounds to help the Kings defeat the Denver Nuggets 116–100.

On January 6, 2018, Cauley-Stein recorded a career-best seven steals in a 106–98 win over the Denver Nuggets.

On October 29, 2018, Cauley-Stein scored 26 points and grabbed 13 rebounds in a 123–113 win over the Miami Heat. On December 23, 2018, he had 22 points and a career-high 17 rebounds in a 122–117 win over the New Orleans Pelicans.

On June 28, 2019, the Kings extended a qualifying offer to Cauley-Stein in order to make him a restricted free agent. The qualifying offer was later rescinded to make more cap space for the Kings to land Cory Joseph.

=== Golden State Warriors (2019–2020) ===
On July 8, 2019, Cauley-Stein signed with the Golden State Warriors. Cauley-Stein made his Warriors debut on October 10 against the Phoenix Suns, scoring 12 points on 5-of-5 shooting and 2-of-2 from the line, along with five rebounds, one assist, one block, and three fouls in 12 minutes.

=== Dallas Mavericks (2020–2022) ===
On January 25, 2020, Cauley-Stein was traded to the Dallas Mavericks for a 2020 second-round pick. He made his debut three days later in a 104–133 loss to the Phoenix Suns, recording four points and two rebounds in 12 minutes. Cauley-Stein opted out of the resumed season in the 2020 NBA Bubble, as he and his partner were expecting a newborn child in July.

After the conclusion of the 2019–20 season, Cauley-Stein declined his option on November 19, 2020, and opted out of his contract, to become a free agent. He later re-signed with the Mavericks on December 1, 2020.

The Mavericks picked up his team option on August 1, 2021, keeping Cauley-Stein for the 2021–22 season. On January 15, 2022, the Mavericks decided to waive him in order to make roster room for new signing Marquese Chriss.

=== Philadelphia 76ers (2022) ===
On February 24, 2022, Cauley-Stein signed a 10-day contract with the Philadelphia 76ers. He was waived on March 3.

=== Rio Grande Valley Vipers (2022–2023) ===
On October 9, 2022, Cauley-Stein signed with the Houston Rockets. On November 3, he was named to the opening night roster for the Rio Grande Valley Vipers. On February 27, 2023, Cauley-Stein signed a 10-day contract with the Houston Rockets, but he never appeared in a game for the team. After his contract with the Rockets expired, he rejoined the Vipers. On April 9, 2023, Cauley-Stein re-signed with the Rockets.

=== Pallacanestro Varese (2023–2024) ===
On July 31, 2023, Cauley-Stein signed with Openjobmetis Varese of the Lega Basket Serie A (LBA) and FIBA Europe Cup. He later explained he signed in Europe “because of the more tactical way of playing”. On October 25, Cauley-Stein had 19 points and 20 rebounds in a 91–71 win over BG Göttingen, which set a new FIBA Europe Cup record for most rebounds in a game by a single player.

On January 30, 2024, Cauley-Stein signed with Indios de Mayagüez, but left the team on March 24.

=== Nanjing Monkey Kings (2024) ===
On October 21, 2024, Cauley-Stein signed with Nanjing Monkey Kings of the Chinese Basketball Association (CBA).

== NBA career statistics ==
Legend
GP	Games played	GS	Games started	MPG	Minutes per game
FG%	Field goal percentage	3P%	3-point field goal percentage	FT%	Free throw percentage
RPG	Rebounds per game	APG	Assists per game	SPG	Steals per game
BPG	Blocks per game	PPG	Points per game	**Bold**	Career high

=== Regular season ===
Year	Team	GP	GS	MPG	FG%	3P%	FT%	RPG	APG	SPG	BPG	PPG
2015–16	Sacramento	66	39	21.4	.563	.000	.648	5.3	.6	.7	1.0	7.0
2016–17	Sacramento	75	21	18.9	.530	.000	**.669**	4.5	1.1	.7	.6	8.1
2017–18	Sacramento	73	57	**28.0**	.502	.250	.619	7.0	**2.4**	1.1	.9	**12.8**
2018–19	Sacramento	**81**	**81**	27.3	.556	**.500**	.551	**8.4**	**2.4**	**1.2**	.6	11.9
2019–20	Golden State	41	37	22.9	.560	.000	.614	6.2	1.5	1.1	**1.2**	7.9
2019–20	Dallas	13	2	12.1	**.689**	.000	.556	4.6	.8	.3	.8	5.2
2020–21	Dallas	53	16	17.1	.632	.091	.628	4.5	.7	.4	.8	5.3
2021–22	Dallas	18	2	9.8	.457	**.500**	.500	2.1	.5	.3	.2	1.9
2021–22	Philadelphia	2	0	3.0	—	—	—	1.0	.5	.0	.0	.0
Career		422	256	22.0	.544	.188	.612	5.9	1.4	.8	.8	8.7

==== Playoffs ====
Year	Team	GP	GS	MPG	FG%	3P%	FT%	RPG	APG	SPG	BPG	PPG
2021	Dallas	6	0	10.5	.667	—	1.000	2.7	.5	.3	.7	2.5
Career		6	0	10.5	.667	—	1.000	2.7	.5	.3	.7	2.5

== Personal life ==
On May 1, 2015, Cauley-Stein officially filed a name-change order with the Probate Division of the Fayette District Court to change his birth name. He did it to honor his mother, Marlene Stein, and his maternal grandparents Norma and Val Stein, who raised him after his father left him when he was four. He also added "Trill" as a middle name, a nickname given to him by friends.

Cauley-Stein's father, Willie Cauley, played college basketball at Dodge City Community College and for one season at the University of Pittsburgh. Willie Cauley met Cauley-Stein's mother, Marlene Stein, while she was playing college basketball for St. Mary of the Plains College.

Cauley-Stein has one child, born in 2020.

In August 2024, Cauley-Stein disclosed that a serious drug addiction was the reason behind his NBA “personal leave” in 2021 and exit in 2022. In an interview with The Athletic's Kyle Tucker, he hopes to make an NBA return and stay clean for his wife and children.
