= 2017–18 Boston Celtics season =

Season of National Basketball Association team the Boston Celtics

- Head coach: Brad Stevens
- General manager: Danny Ainge
- Owners: Boston Basketball Partners
- Arena: TD Garden

Results
- Record: 55–27 (.671)
- Place: Division: 2nd (Atlantic); Conference: 2nd (Eastern)
- Playoff finish: Eastern Conference Finals (lost to Cavaliers 3–4)
- Stats at Basketball Reference

Local media
- Television: NBC Sports Boston
- Radio: WBZ-FM

The 2017–18 Boston Celtics season was the 72nd season of the franchise in the National Basketball Association (NBA). The Celtics originally acquired the number one pick of the NBA draft due to a previous trade involving the Brooklyn Nets, only to then trade it to the Philadelphia 76ers in exchange for two different draft picks. One of the picks would allow Boston to draft forward Jayson Tatum. Later, they acquired Gordon Hayward in free agency on July 7, 2017. They would also acquire 4-time All-Star Kyrie Irving from the Cleveland Cavaliers via trade on August 22, 2017, in exchange for Ante Žižić, Jae Crowder, All-Star point guard Isaiah Thomas, the Brooklyn Nets' unprotected first-round pick in the 2018 NBA draft, and a 2020 second-round pick, originally from the Miami Heat.

Following several offseason transactions, the Celtics returned only four players from the previous season: Marcus Smart, Terry Rozier, Al Horford, and Jaylen Brown. They opened the regular season on October 17, 2017, against the Cleveland Cavaliers, which pitted Irving against his former team. The Celtics retired the number 34 in honor of former small forward Paul Pierce on February 11, 2018, following a game against the Cavaliers.

In the playoffs, the Celtics defeated the 7th-seeded Milwaukee Bucks in the first round in seven games, advancing to the semifinals, where they faced the Philadelphia 76ers, winning in five games, advancing to the conference finals, where they faced the Cleveland Cavaliers in a rematch of last season's Eastern Conference finals, in which the Cavaliers won 4–3. Despite losing both star acquisitions Gordon Hayward and Kyrie Irving before the playoffs began to season-ending injuries, the Celtics would make this series more hard-fought this time (each game ending with no larger than a deficit of 8 points), but lost in seven games to the Cavaliers, losing 79–87 at home in Game 7. It marks the first time since the 1987–88 season that the Celtics made two consecutive Conference finals.

== Draft picks ==
Round	Pick	Player	Position	Nationality	College
1	3	Jayson Tatum	SF	United States	Duke
2	37	Semi Ojeleye	PF	United States	Southern Methodist
2	53	Kadeem Allen	PG	United States	Arizona
2	56	Jabari Bird	SG	United States	California

Despite having the best record in the Eastern Conference the previous season, the Celtics would originally win the number one pick at the end of the year because they activated the right to swap their own first-round draft pick (which was pick number 27) with the Brooklyn Nets, who held the worst record of the entire NBA that same season. (The Nets struggled in part because of a previous, infamous trade with the Celtics, that swapped role players Jason Terry and D.J. White and superstars Kevin Garnett and Paul Pierce for other players and draft picks, including the right to swap first-round picks in the 2017 NBA draft.) However, on June 19, four days before the 2017 NBA draft commenced, the Celtics would trade that coveted pick to the Philadelphia 76ers in exchange for the third pick of the draft (which was projected to be a small forward in either Josh Jackson or Jayson Tatum by that point) and either the Sacramento Kings or Philadelphia 76ers' 2019 first-round pick, depending on what happens in that year's draft. Other than that, the Celtics also hold three second round draft picks, each of which were acquired by trades, while losing their own second-round pick as an added piece of help for the Nets later on down the line. Their first second-round pick was acquired from the Phoenix Suns back when it was considered a first-round pick from the Minnesota Timberwolves in exchange for Brandan Wright. The next second-round pick was from the Cleveland Cavaliers alongside their 2016 second-round pick and Keith Bogans in exchange for John Lucas III, Erik Murphy, Dwight Powell, Malcolm Thomas, and the protected rights of the Sacramento Kings' own second-round picks from both 2015 and 2017. Finally, their last second-round pick was acquired from the Los Angeles Clippers in a three-way trade with the Phoenix Suns, where Boston would acquire Shavlik Randolph again and a trade exception from the Suns, as well as both Chris Douglas-Roberts and a second-round pick from the Clippers.

With their top pick (and the one that Danny Ainge claimed would have taken as the number one pick instead of Markelle Fultz), the Boston Celtics selected a 19-year-old freshman, small forward Jayson Tatum, of Duke University. In his only season at Duke, Jayson averaged 16.8 points, 7.3 rebounds, 2.1 assists, 1.3 steals, and 1.1 blocks per game in over 29 games there, while also earning All-ACC Freshman Team and All-ACC Third Team honors throughout last season. Tatum would end the season as a near-unanimous NBA All-Rookie First Team member. In terms of their second-round picks, the first one they took would be another small forward, this time being Semi Ojeleye, a transfer junior from Southern Methodist University (previously from Duke University as well). During his only year at Southern Methodist, Ojeleye helped lead the Mustangs to their second ever AAC Tournament victory by recording averages of 18.9 points and 6.8 rebounds per game there. As a result of his efforts, he became the AAC Tournament's MVP that year, as well as be named to the All-AAC First Team, the AAC Player of The Year, and was an honorable mention via the Associated Press for the NCAA All-American Team. For the second of Boston's three second-round picks, at number 53, the Celtics selected senior shooting guard Kadeem Allen from University of Arizona. In his senior year at Arizona, he averaged 9.8 points and 4 rebounds per game, which would be enough for him to be named a member of the Pac-12 Second Team and Pac-12 Defensive Team. Finally, with their last second-round pick at number 56, Boston chose another senior shooting guard, this time being Jabari Bird from the University of California. During his last season at California, Bird averaged 14.3 points and 4.3 rebounds for the Golden Bears, but he suffered a concussion during one of his last games there. Both Kadeem Allen and Jabari Bird would become the team's first-ever players to sign two-way contracts with the team, meaning they get to split their playing time for at least this season between the Celtics and their NBA G League affiliate, the Maine Red Claws, with Maine holding them for the majority of this season as a result of the two-way contract's stipulations.

== Roster ==
2017–18 Boston Celtics roster
Players

Pos.	No.	Player	Height	Weight	DOB	From
G	45	Kadeem Allen (TW)	6 ft 3 in (1.91 m)	200 lb (91 kg)	1993-01-15	Arizona
C	46	Aron Baynes (injured)	6 ft 10 in (2.08 m)	260 lb (118 kg)	1986-12-09	Washington State
G	26	Jabari Bird (TW)	6 ft 6 in (1.98 m)	198 lb (90 kg)	1994-07-03	California
G/F	7	Jaylen Brown	6 ft 7 in (2.01 m)	225 lb (102 kg)	1996-10-24	California
F	20	Gordon Hayward (injured)	6 ft 8 in (2.03 m)	226 lb (103 kg)	1990-03-23	Butler
F/C	42	Al Horford	6 ft 10 in (2.08 m)	250 lb (113 kg)	1986-06-03	Florida
G	11	Kyrie Irving (injured)	6 ft 3 in (1.91 m)	193 lb (88 kg)	1992-03-23	Duke
G	8	Shane Larkin (injured)	5 ft 11 in (1.80 m)	175 lb (79 kg)	1992-10-02	Miami (FL)
C	55	Greg Monroe	6 ft 11 in (2.11 m)	265 lb (120 kg)	1990-06-04	Georgetown
F	13	Marcus Morris	6 ft 10 in (2.08 m)	235 lb (107 kg)	1989-09-02	Kansas
F	28	Abdel Nader	6 ft 6 in (1.98 m)	230 lb (104 kg)	1993-09-25	Iowa State
F	37	Semi Ojeleye	6 ft 7 in (2.01 m)	235 lb (107 kg)	1994-12-05	SMU
G	12	Terry Rozier	6 ft 2 in (1.88 m)	190 lb (86 kg)	1994-03-17	Louisville
G	36	Marcus Smart	6 ft 4 in (1.93 m)	220 lb (100 kg)	1994-03-06	Oklahoma State
F	0	Jayson Tatum	6 ft 8 in (2.03 m)	205 lb (93 kg)	1998-03-03	Duke
F	27	Daniel Theis (injured)	6 ft 9 in (2.06 m)	243 lb (110 kg)	1992-04-04	Germany
F	30	Guerschon Yabusele	6 ft 8 in (2.03 m)	260 lb (118 kg)	1995-12-17	France

Coaches
Head coach
- Brad Stevens
Assistant(s)
- Jerome Allen
- Jay Larrañaga
- Scott Morrison
- Micah Shrewsberry
- Jamie Young

Legend
- (DP) Unsigned draft pick
- (FA) Free agent
- (S) Suspended
- (GL) On assignment to G League affiliate
- (TW) Two-way affiliate player
- Injured

Roster
Updated: 2018-04–06

== Standings ==
=== Division ===
Atlantic Division	W	L	PCT	GB	Home	Road	Div	GP
c – Toronto Raptors	59	23	.720	–	34‍–‍7	25‍–‍16	12–4	82
x – Boston Celtics	55	27	.671	4.0	27‍–‍14	28‍–‍13	12–4	82
x – Philadelphia 76ers	52	30	.634	7.0	30‍–‍11	22‍–‍19	9–7	82
New York Knicks	29	53	.354	30.0	19‍–‍22	10‍–‍31	6–10	82
Brooklyn Nets	28	54	.341	31.0	15‍–‍26	13‍–‍28	1–15	82

=== Conference ===
Eastern Conference
#	Team	W	L	PCT	GB	GP
1	c – Toronto Raptors *	59	23	.720	–	82
2	x – Boston Celtics	55	27	.671	4.0	82
3	x – Philadelphia 76ers	52	30	.634	7.0	82
4	y – Cleveland Cavaliers *	50	32	.610	9.0	82
5	x – Indiana Pacers	48	34	.585	11.0	82
6	y – Miami Heat *	44	38	.537	15.0	82
7	x – Milwaukee Bucks	44	38	.537	15.0	82
8	x – Washington Wizards	43	39	.524	16.0	82
9	Detroit Pistons	39	43	.476	20.0	82
10	Charlotte Hornets	36	46	.439	23.0	82
11	New York Knicks	29	53	.354	30.0	82
12	Brooklyn Nets	28	54	.341	31.0	82
13	Chicago Bulls	27	55	.329	32.0	82
14	Orlando Magic	25	57	.305	34.0	82
15	Atlanta Hawks	24	58	.293	35.0	82

== Game log ==
=== Preseason ===
2017 pre-season game log
Total: 4–0 (home: 2–0; road: 2–0)
Pre-season: 4–0 (home: 2–0; road: 2–0)

Game	Date	Team	Score	High points	High rebounds	High assists	Location Attendance	Record
1	October 2	Charlotte	W 94–82	Daniel Theis (12)	Daniel Theis (7)	Jayson Tatum (5)	TD Garden; 18,624	1–0
2	October 6	@ Philadelphia	W 110–102	Kyrie Irving (21)	Al Horford (9)	Gordon Hayward (5)	Wells Fargo Center; 17,668	2–0
3	October 9	Philadelphia	W 113–96	Semi Ojeleye (16)	Terry Rozier (10)	Terry Rozier (6)	TD Garden; 18,624	3–0
4	October 11	@ Charlotte	W 108–100	Kyrie Irving (16)	Al Horford (8)	Kyrie Irving (10)	Spectrum Center; N/A	4–0

2017–18 season schedule

=== Regular season ===
2017–18 game log
Total: 55–27 (home: 27–14; road: 28–13)
October: 5–2 (home: 2–1; road: 3–1)

Game	Date	Team	Score	High points	High rebounds	High assists	Location Attendance	Record
1	October 17	@ Cleveland	L 99–102	Jaylen Brown (25)	Jayson Tatum (10)	Kyrie Irving (10)	Quicken Loans Arena; 20,562	0–1
2	October 18	Milwaukee	L 100–108	Jaylen Brown (18)	Jayson Tatum (9)	Terry Rozier (6)	TD Garden; 18,624	0–2
3	October 20	@ Philadelphia	W 102–92	Kyrie Irving (21)	Al Horford (9)	Irving, Larkin (4)	Wells Fargo Center; 20,816	1–2
4	October 24	New York	W 110–89	Jaylen Brown (23)	Al Horford (13)	Kyrie Irving (7)	TD Garden; 18,624	2–2
5	October 26	@ Milwaukee	W 96–89	Al Horford (27)	Al Horford (9)	Kyrie Irving (7)	UW–Milwaukee Panther Arena; 11,046	3–2
6	October 28	@ Miami	W 96–90	Kyrie Irving (24)	Al Horford (9)	Marcus Smart (4)	American Airlines Arena; 19,600	4–2
7	October 30	San Antonio	W 108–94	Kyrie Irving (24)	Al Horford (13)	Kyrie Irving (6)	TD Garden; 18,624	5–2

November : 14–2 (home: 7–1; road: 7–1)

Game	Date	Team	Score	High points	High rebounds	High assists	Location Attendance	Record
8	November 1	Sacramento	W 113–86	Brown, Irving (22)	Daniel Theis (10)	Marcus Smart (8)	TD Garden; 18,624	6–2
9	November 3	@ Oklahoma City	W 101–94	Kyrie Irving (25)	Jaylen Brown (12)	Kyrie Irving (6)	Chesapeake Energy Arena; 18,203	7–2
10	November 5	@ Orlando	W 104–88	Jaylen Brown (18)	Al Horford (10)	Marcus Smart (8)	Amway Center; 17,731	8–2
11	November 6	@ Atlanta	W 110–107	Kyrie Irving (35)	Al Horford (10)	Al Horford (9)	Philips Arena; 13,215	9–2
12	November 8	L.A. Lakers	W 107–96	Aron Baynes (21)	Jaylen Brown (11)	Marcus Smart (6)	TD Garden; 18,624	10–2
13	November 10	Charlotte	W 90–87	Larkin, Tatum (16)	Jaylen Brown (13)	Marcus Smart (7)	TD Garden; 18,624	11–2
14	November 12	Toronto	W 95–94	Al Horford (21)	Aron Baynes (8)	Marcus Smart (9)	TD Garden; 18,624	12–2
15	November 14	@ Brooklyn	W 109–102	Kyrie Irving (25)	Al Horford (11)	Kyrie Irving (5)	Barclays Center; 12,936	13–2
16	November 16	Golden State	W 92–88	Jaylen Brown (22)	Al Horford (11)	Kyrie Irving (6)	TD Garden; 18,624	14–2
17	November 18	@ Atlanta	W 110–99	Kyrie Irving (30)	Jayson Tatum (7)	Al Horford (6)	Philips Arena; 16,381	15–2
18	November 20	@ Dallas	W 110–102 (OT)	Kyrie Irving (47)	Brown, Morris, Tatum (9)	Marcus Smart (8)	American Airlines Center; 20,302	16–2
19	November 22	@ Miami	L 98–104	Kyrie Irving (23)	Al Horford (9)	Horford, Smart, Tatum (4)	American Airlines Arena; 19,704	16–3
20	November 24	Orlando	W 118–103	Kyrie Irving (30)	Aron Baynes (11)	Al Horford (10)	TD Garden; 18,624	17–3
21	November 25	@ Indiana	W 108–98	Kyrie Irving (25)	Marcus Smart (6)	Horford, Irving (6)	Bankers Life Fieldhouse; 16,303	18–3
22	November 27	Detroit	L 108–118	Marcus Smart (23)	Brown, Baynes (6)	Kyrie Irving (9)	TD Garden; 18,624	18–4
23	November 30	Philadelphia	W 108–97	Kyrie Irving (36)	Horford, Theis (8)	Marcus Smart (8)	TD Garden; 18,624	19–4

December : 11–6 (home: 7–3; road: 4–3)

Game	Date	Team	Score	High points	High rebounds	High assists	Location Attendance	Record
24	December 2	Phoenix	W 116–111	Kyrie Irving (19)	Marcus Morris (8)	Al Horford (11)	TD Garden; 18,624	20–4
25	December 4	Milwaukee	W 111–100	Kyrie Irving (32)	Al Horford (9)	Al Horford (8)	TD Garden; 18,624	21–4
26	December 6	Dallas	W 97–90	Kyrie Irving (23)	Jayson Tatum (10)	Al Horford (8)	TD Garden; 18,624	22–4
27	December 8	@ San Antonio	L 102–105	Kyrie Irving (36)	Al Horford (9)	Horford, Morris (5)	AT&T Center; 18,418	22–5
28	December 10	@ Detroit	W 91–81	Al Horford (18)	Aron Baynes (13)	Al Horford (6)	Little Caesars Arena; 18,776	23–5
29	December 11	@ Chicago	L 85–108	Al Horford (15)	Jayson Tatum (10)	Horford, Rozier (5)	United Center; 19,617	23–6
30	December 13	Denver	W 124–118	Kyrie Irving (33)	Aron Baynes (6)	Marcus Smart (9)	TD Garden; 18,624	24–6
31	December 15	Utah	L 95–107	Kyrie Irving (33)	Brown, Horford (6)	Al Horford (7)	TD Garden; 18,624	24–7
32	December 16	@ Memphis	W 102–93	Kyrie Irving (20)	Jayson Tatum (9)	Horford, Irving (6)	FedExForum; 17,794	25–7
33	December 18	@ Indiana	W 112–111	Kyrie Irving (30)	Al Horford (10)	Al Horford (9)	Bankers Life Fieldhouse; 16,055	26–7
34	December 20	Miami	L 89–90	Kyrie Irving (33)	Al Horford (8)	Kyrie Irving (5)	TD Garden; 18,624	26–8
35	December 21	@ New York	L 93–102	Kyrie Irving (32)	Daniel Theis (7)	Al Horford (5)	Madison Square Garden; 19,812	26–9
36	December 23	Chicago	W 117–92	Kyrie Irving (25)	Daniel Theis (15)	Kyrie Irving (7)	TD Garden; 18,624	27–9
37	December 25	Washington	L 103–111	Irving, Tatum (20)	Jaylen Brown (9)	Al Horford (6)	TD Garden; 18,624	27–10
38	December 27	@ Charlotte	W 102–91	Kyrie Irving (21)	Al Horford (11)	Kyrie Irving (8)	Spectrum Center; 19,611	28–10
39	December 28	Houston	W 99–98	Kyrie Irving (26)	Al Horford (8)	Marcus Smart (5)	TD Garden; 18,624	29–10
40	December 31	Brooklyn	W 108–105	Kyrie Irving (28)	Baynes, Horford (10)	Al Horford (5)	TD Garden; 18,624	30–10

January : 7–5 (home: 3–3; road: 4–2)

Game	Date	Team	Score	High points	High rebounds	High assists	Location Attendance	Record
41	January 3	Cleveland	W 102–88	Terry Rozier (20)	Horford, Irving (9)	Kyrie Irving (6)	TD Garden; 18,624	31–10
42	January 5	Minnesota	W 91–84	Marcus Smart (18)	Baynes, Theis (10)	Horford, Irving (8)	TD Garden; 18,624	32–10
43	January 6	@ Brooklyn	W 87–85	Kyrie Irving (21)	Daniel Theis (10)	Kyrie Irving (4)	Barclays Center; 17,732	33–10
44	January 11	@ Philadelphia	W 114–103	Jaylen Brown (21)	Horford, Morris (8)	Horford, Irving (7)	The O2 Arena; 19.078	34–10
45	January 16	New Orleans	L 113–116 (OT)	Kyrie Irving (24)	Al Horford (9)	Al Horford (6)	TD Garden; 18,624	34–11
46	January 18	Philadelphia	L 80–89	Horford, Morris (14)	Marcus Morris (6)	Jaylen Brown (4)	TD Garden; 18,624	34–12
47	January 21	Orlando	L 95–103	Kyrie Irving (40)	Jayson Tatum (10)	Kyrie Irving (5)	TD Garden; 18,624	34–13
48	January 23	@ L.A. Lakers	L 107–108	Kyrie Irving (33)	Al Horford (12)	Al Horford (6)	Staples Center; 18,997	34–14
49	January 24	@ L.A. Clippers	W 113–102	Kyrie Irving (20)	Brown, Irving, Theis (8)	Kyrie Irving (7)	Staples Center; 19,430	35–14
50	January 27	@ Golden State	L 105–109	Kyrie Irving (37)	Al Horford (13)	Kyrie Irving (4)	Oracle Arena; 19,596	35–15
51	January 29	@ Denver	W 111–110	Kyrie Irving (27)	Terry Rozier (9)	Irving, Horford, Rozier (6)	Pepsi Center; 19,520	36–15
52	January 31	New York	W 103–73	Marcus Morris (20)	Terry Rozier (11)	Terry Rozier (10)	TD Garden; 18,624	37–15

February : 7–4 (home: 4–3; road: 3–1)

Game	Date	Team	Score	High points	High rebounds	High assists	Location Attendance	Record
53	February 2	Atlanta	W 119–110	Terry Rozier (31)	Aron Baynes (8)	Al Horford (7)	TD Garden; 18,624	38–15
54	February 4	Portland	W 97–96	Al Horford (22)	Al Horford (10)	Horford, Tatum, Rozier (5)	TD Garden; 18,624	39–15
55	February 6	@ Toronto	L 91–111	Terry Rozier (18)	Aron Baynes (8)	Terry Rozier (4)	Air Canada Centre; 20,017	39–16
56	February 8	@ Washington	W 110–104 (OT)	Kyrie Irving (28)	Marcus Morris (8)	Kyrie Irving (6)	Capital One Arena; 20,356	40–16
57	February 9	Indiana	L 91–97	Kyrie Irving (21)	Al Horford (8)	Kyrie Irving (5)	TD Garden; 18,624	40–17
58	February 11	Cleveland	L 99–121	Terry Rozier (21)	Terry Rozier (9)	Al Horford (6)	TD Garden; 18,624	40–18
59	February 14	L.A. Clippers	L 119–129	Kyrie Irving (33)	Marcus Morris (11)	Kyrie Irving (8)	TD Garden; 18,624	40–19
All-Star Break
60	February 23	@ Detroit	W 110–98	Daniel Theis (19)	Daniel Theis (7)	Terry Rozier (7)	Little Caesars Arena; 20,491	41–19
61	February 24	@ New York	W 121–112	Kyrie Irving (31)	Al Horford (10)	Kyrie Irving (8)	Madison Square Garden; 19,812	42–19
62	February 26	Memphis	W 109–98	Kyrie Irving (25)	Marcus Morris (8)	Irving, Smart (5)	TD Garden; 18,624	43–19
63	February 28	Charlotte	W 134–106	Kyrie Irving (34)	Al Horford (10)	Marcus Smart (6)	TD Garden; 18,624	44–19

March : 9–4 (home: 2–2; road: 7–2)

Game	Date	Team	Score	High points	High rebounds	High assists	Location Attendance	Record
64	March 3	@ Houston	L 120–123	Marcus Morris (21)	Monroe, Horford, Smart (6)	Kyrie Irving (6)	Toyota Center; 18,055	44–20
65	March 5	@ Chicago	W 105–89	Jaylen Brown (21)	Greg Monroe (9)	Terry Rozier (7)	United Center; 21,286	45–20
66	March 8	@ Minnesota	W 117–109	Kyrie Irving (23)	Al Horford (8)	Kyrie Irving (8)	Target Center; 18,978	46–20
67	March 11	Indiana	L 97–99	Marcus Smart (20)	Marcus Smart (7)	Marcus Smart (8)	TD Garden; 18,624	46–21
68	March 14	Washington	L 124–125 (2OT)	Marcus Morris (31)	Greg Monroe (10)	Terry Rozier (9)	TD Garden; 18,624	46–22
69	March 16	@ Orlando	W 92–83	Monroe, Rozier (17)	Marcus Morris (11)	Terry Rozier (5)	Amway Center; 18,981	47–22
70	March 18	@ New Orleans	L 89–108	Jayson Tatum (23)	Terry Rozier (7)	Terry Rozier (5)	Smoothie King Center; 18,277	47–23
71	March 20	Oklahoma City	W 100–99	Jayson Tatum (23)	Jayson Tatum (11)	Al Horford (7)	TD Garden; 18,624	48–23
72	March 23	@ Portland	W 105–100	Marcus Morris (30)	Greg Monroe (10)	Shane Larkin (7)	Moda Center; 19,575	49–23
73	March 25	@ Sacramento	W 104–93	Terry Rozier (33)	Greg Monroe (8)	Al Horford (8)	Golden 1 Center; 17,583	50–23
74	March 26	@ Phoenix	W 102–94	Jayson Tatum (23)	Al Horford (9)	Al Horford (7)	Talking Stick Resort Arena; 18,055	51–23
75	March 28	@ Utah	W 97–94	Jaylen Brown (21)	Shane Larkin (9)	Larkin, Monroe (4)	Vivint Smart Home Arena; 18,306	52–23
76	March 31	Toronto	W 110–99	Marcus Morris (25)	Marcus Morris (9)	Terry Rozier (7)	TD Garden; 18,624	53–23

April : 2–4 (home: 2–1; road: 0–3)

Game	Date	Team	Score	High points	High rebounds	High assists	Location Attendance	Record
77	April 3	@ Milwaukee	L 102–106	Jaylen Brown (22)	Greg Monroe (10)	Al Horford (5)	Bradley Center; 16,188	53–24
78	April 4	@ Toronto	L 78–96	Marcus Morris (21)	Terry Rozier (9)	Monroe, Rozier, Tatum (3)	Air Canada Centre; 19,963	53–25
79	April 6	Chicago	W 111–104	Jaylen Brown (32)	Greg Monroe (11)	Greg Monroe (10)	TD Garden; 18,624	54–25
80	April 8	Atlanta	L 106–112	Jayson Tatum (19)	Terry Rozier (8)	Terry Rozier (9)	TD Garden; 18,624	54–26
81	April 10	@ Washington	L 101–113	Jaylen Brown (27)	Al Horford (13)	Terry Rozier (5)	Capital One Arena; 18,887	54–27
82	April 11	Brooklyn	W 110–97	Aron Baynes (26)	Aron Baynes (14)	Shane Larkin (7)	TD Garden; 18,624	55–27

2017–18 season schedule

=== Playoffs ===
2018 playoff game log
Total: 11–8 (home: 10–1; road: 1–7)
First Round: 4–3 (home: 4–0; road: 0–3)

Game	Date	Team	Score	High points	High rebounds	High assists	Location Attendance	Series
1	April 15	Milwaukee	W 113–107 (OT)	Al Horford (24)	Al Horford (12)	Horford, Tatum, Brown (4)	TD Garden; 18,624	1–0
2	April 17	Milwaukee	W 120–106	Jaylen Brown (30)	Jayson Tatum (7)	Terry Rozier (8)	TD Garden; 18,624	2–0
3	April 20	@ Milwaukee	L 92–116	Al Horford (16)	Greg Monroe (11)	Terry Rozier (9)	Bradley Center; 18,717	2–1
4	April 22	@ Milwaukee	L 102–104	Jaylen Brown (34)	Aron Baynes (11)	Terry Rozier (8)	Bradley Center; 18,717	2–2
5	April 24	Milwaukee	W 92–87	Al Horford (22)	Al Horford (14)	Terry Rozier (5)	TD Garden; 18,624	3–2
6	April 26	@ Milwaukee	L 86–97	Jayson Tatum (22)	Al Horford (10)	Terry Rozier (5)	Bradley Center; 18,717	3–3
7	April 28	Milwaukee	W 112–96	Terry Rozier (26)	Al Horford (8)	Terry Rozier (9)	TD Garden; 18,624	4–3

Conference Semifinals: 4–1 (home: 3–0; road: 1–1)

Game	Date	Team	Score	High points	High rebounds	High assists	Location Attendance	Series
1	April 30	Philadelphia	W 117–101	Terry Rozier (29)	Terry Rozier (8)	Marcus Smart (9)	TD Garden; 18,624	1–0
2	May 3	Philadelphia	W 108–103	Jayson Tatum (21)	Al Horford (12)	Terry Rozier (9)	TD Garden; 18,624	2–0
3	May 5	@ Philadelphia	W 101–98 (OT)	Jayson Tatum (24)	Aron Baynes (10)	Jayson Tatum (4)	Wells Fargo Center; 20,758	3–0
4	May 7	@ Philadelphia	L 92–103	Jayson Tatum (20)	Al Horford (10)	Jayson Tatum (4)	Wells Fargo Center; 20,936	3–1
5	May 9	Philadelphia	W 114–112	Jayson Tatum (25)	Aron Baynes (9)	Marcus Smart (6)	TD Garden; 18,624	4–1

Conference Finals: 3–4 (home: 3–1; road: 0–3)

Game	Date	Team	Score	High points	High rebounds	High assists	Location Attendance	Series
1	May 13	Cleveland	W 108–83	Jaylen Brown (23)	Marcus Morris (10)	Terry Rozier (8)	TD Garden; 18,624	1–0
2	May 15	Cleveland	W 107–94	Jaylen Brown (23)	Al Horford (10)	Marcus Smart (9)	TD Garden; 18,624	2–0
3	May 19	@ Cleveland	L 86–116	Jayson Tatum (18)	Al Horford (7)	Marcus Smart (6)	Quicken Loans Arena; 20,562	2–1
4	May 21	@ Cleveland	L 102–111	Jaylen Brown (23)	Al Horford (7)	Terry Rozier (11)	Quicken Loans Arena; 20,562	2–2
5	May 23	Cleveland	W 96–83	Jayson Tatum (24)	Al Horford (12)	Terry Rozier (6)	TD Garden; 18,624	3–2
6	May 25	@ Cleveland	L 99–109	Terry Rozier (28)	Al Horford (9)	Marcus Smart (8)	Quicken Loans Arena; 20,562	3–3
7	May 27	Cleveland	L 79–87	Jayson Tatum (24)	Marcus Morris (12)	Marcus Smart (7)	TD Garden; 18,624	3–4

2018 playoff schedule

== Player statistics ==
Legend
GP	Games played	GS	Games started	MPG	Minutes per game
FG%	Field-goal percentage	3P%	3-point field-goal percentage	FT%	Free-throw percentage
RPG	Rebounds per game	APG	Assists per game	SPG	Steals per game
BPG	Blocks per game	PPG	Points per game

=== Regular season ===
Boston Celtics statistics
Player	GP	GS	MPG	FG%	3P%	FT%	RPG	APG	SPG	BPG	PPG
Aron Baynes	81	67	18.3	.471	.143	.756	5.4	1.1	.3	.6	6.0
Jayson Tatum	80	80	30.5	.475	.434	.826	5.0	1.6	1.0	.7	13.9
Terry Rozier	80	16	25.9	.395	.381	.772	4.7	2.9	1.0	.2	11.3
Semi Ojeleye	73	0	15.8	.346	.320	.610	2.2	.3	.3	.1	2.7
Al Horford	72	72	31.6	.489	.429	.783	7.4	4.7	.6	1.1	12.9
Jaylen Brown	70	70	30.7	.465	.395	.644	4.9	1.6	1.0	.4	14.5
Daniel Theis	63	3	14.9	.541	.310	.753	4.3	.9	.5	.8	5.3
Kyrie Irving	60	60	32.2	.491	.408	.889	3.8	5.1	1.1	.3	24.4
Marcus Morris Sr.	54	21	26.7	.429	.368	.805	5.4	1.3	.6	.2	13.6
Marcus Smart	54	11	29.9	.367	.301	.729	3.5	4.8	1.3	.4	10.2
Shane Larkin	54	2	14.4	.384	.360	.865	1.7	1.8	.5	.0	4.3
Abdel Nader	48	1	10.9	.336	.354	.590	1.5	.5	.3	.2	3.0
Guerschon Yabusele	33	4	7.1	.426	.324	.682	1.6	.5	.1	.2	2.4
Greg Monroe^{†}	26	0	19.1	.530		.797	6.3	2.3	1.1	.7	10.2
Kadeem Allen	18	1	5.9	.273	.000	.778	.6	.7	.2	.1	1.1
Jabari Bird	13	1	8.8	.577	.429	.462	1.5	.6	.2	.1	3.0
Jonathan Gibson	4	0	10.0	.609	.500		.8	1.0	.0	.0	8.5
Xavier Silas	2	0	3.5	.000	.000		1.0	.0	.5	.0	.0
Jarell Eddie^{†}	2	0	3.0	.000	.000		.5	.0	.5	.0	.0
Gordon Hayward	1	1	5.0	.500	.000		1.0	.0	.0	.0	2.0

=== Playoffs ===
Boston Celtics statistics
Player	GP	GS	MPG	FG%	3P%	FT%	RPG	APG	SPG	BPG	PPG
Terry Rozier	19	19	36.6	.406	.347	.821	5.3	5.7	1.3	.3	16.5
Jayson Tatum	19	19	35.9	.471	.324	.845	4.4	2.7	1.2	.5	18.5
Al Horford	19	19	35.7	.544	.349	.827	8.3	3.3	1.0	1.2	15.7
Aron Baynes	19	12	20.5	.506	.478	.722	6.2	1.0	.2	.6	6.0
Marcus Morris Sr.	19	4	29.6	.368	.417	.712	5.4	1.1	.4	.3	12.4
Jaylen Brown	18	15	32.4	.466	.393	.640	4.8	1.4	.8	.6	18.0
Semi Ojeleye	17	3	13.5	.303	.273	.857	1.6	.1	.2	.0	1.9
Marcus Smart	15	4	29.9	.336	.221	.735	3.7	5.3	1.7	.7	9.8
Guerschon Yabusele	12	0	4.0	.111	.000	.400	.9	.3	.2	.0	.3
Shane Larkin	11	0	14.0	.457	.308	1.000	1.0	1.8	.5	.0	3.7
Greg Monroe	11	0	9.5	.500		.682	3.2	.5	.2	.2	4.8
Abdel Nader	11	0	3.0	.333	.000	.500	.3	.3	.1	.1	1.1

- ^{†} Denotes player spent time with another team in the season. Stats reflect time with the Celtics only.

== Transactions ==
=== Trades ===
June 19, 2017	To Boston Celtics Jayson Tatum (Pick 3); 2019 Sacramento #1 protected/Philadelphia 76ers first-round pick (Converted from 2018 protected L.A. Lakers first-round pick since it was not conveyed)	To Philadelphia 76ers Markelle Fultz (Pick 1)
July 7, 2017	To Boston Celtics Marcus Morris	To Detroit Pistons Avery Bradley; 2019 second-round pick
August 22, 2017	To Boston Celtics Kyrie Irving	To Cleveland Cavaliers Isaiah Thomas; Jae Crowder; Ante Žižić; 2018 first-round pick (from Brooklyn); 2020 second-round pick (from Miami)

=== Free agency ===
==== Additions ====
Player	Signed	Former Team
Gordon Hayward	4-year contract worth $128 million	Utah Jazz
Abdel Nader	4-year contract worth $6 million	Maine Red Claws
Aron Baynes	1-year contract worth $4.3 million	Detroit Pistons
Daniel Theis	2-year contract worth $2.2 million	(Germany) Brose Bamberg
Guerschon Yabusele	2-year contract worth $4.9 million	Maine Red Claws
Shane Larkin	1-year contract worth $1.5 million	(Spain) Saski Baskonia
Jarell Eddie	10-day contract worth $86,119	Windy City Bulls
Greg Monroe	1-year contract worth $5.0 million	Phoenix Suns

==== Subtractions ====
Player	Reason	New Team
Tyler Zeller	Waived	Brooklyn Nets
Kelly Olynyk	4-year contract worth $50 million	Miami Heat
Amir Johnson	1-year contract worth $11 million	Philadelphia 76ers
Jordan Mickey	Waived	Miami Heat
Demetrius Jackson	Waived	Houston Rockets
Jonas Jerebko	2-year contract worth $8.2 million	Utah Jazz
James Young	Waived	Wisconsin Herd
Gerald Green	1-year contract worth $1.3 million	Houston Rockets
Jarell Eddie	10-day contract expired	Windy City Bulls

== Awards ==
Recipient	Award	Date awarded	Ref.
Brad Stevens	Eastern Conference Coach of the Month (October/November)	December 2, 2017	
Jayson Tatum	Eastern Conference Rookies of the Mont (December)	January 4, 2018	
