= 2017–18 Sacramento Kings season =

NBA professional basketball team season

- Head coach: Dave Joerger
- General manager: Vlade Divac
- Owner: Vivek Ranadivé
- Arena: Golden 1 Center

Results
- Record: 27–55 (.329)
- Place: Division: 4th (Pacific); Conference: 12th (Western)
- Playoff finish: Did not qualify
- Stats at Basketball Reference

Local media
- Television: NBC Sports California; CBS 13
- Radio: KHTK Sports 1140

The 2017–18 Sacramento Kings season was the 73rd season of the franchise, its 69th season in the National Basketball Association (NBA), and its 33rd in Sacramento.

With the Minnesota Timberwolves clinching their first winning record and playoff berth since 2003–04, the Kings now hold the current league record of most seasons without a winning record as well as the longest postseason drought, both at 12, with their last winning season and playoff appearance being a 44–38 record and a First Round defeat to the San Antonio Spurs in six games in the 2005–06 season. The Kings have now equalled the Golden State Warriors between 1994–95 and 2005–06 as the third-longest NBA postseason drought on record, behind only the Timberwolves above and the fifteen-season drought by the Buffalo Braves, San Diego Clippers and Los Angeles Clippers between 1976–77 and 1990–91 inclusive. The Kings now need three more losing seasons to break the NBA record for most consecutive losing seasons, which the Kings set between 1983–84 and 1997–98 and had been previously suffered by the Pistons between 1956–57 and 1969–70 inclusive.

== Draft picks ==
Round	Pick	Player	Position	Nationality	College / Club
1	5	De'Aaron Fox	PG	United States	Kentucky
1	10	Zach Collins	C	United States	Gonzaga
2	34	Frank Mason III	PG	United States	Kansas

Each of the Sacramento Kings' picks they acquired this year would be had via trades. The fifth pick of the draft, which was originally placed to be a likely 8th pick, had them move up into the Top 3 before the Philadelphia 76ers activated their pick swapping rights with them moving down from a likely fourth spot to the fifth pick due to the trade where they gave up Nik Stauskas, Carl Landry, Jason Thompson, their unprotected 2019 first-round pick, and the rights for Philadelphia to swap first-round picks in 2017 in exchange for the rights of Artūras Gudaitis and Luka Mitrović. Meanwhile, both their second Top 10 first-round pick (at pick 10) and their sole second-round pick came from the New Orleans Pelicans, where they gave up their star center DeMarcus Cousins and Omri Casspi in order to acquire both the Pelicans' first-round pick and the second-round pick that the Philadelphia 76ers held this year, as well as gain the return of Tyreke Evans, last year's All-Rookie team member Buddy Hield, and Langston Galloway. As for their own second round selection (which was worst then the second-round pick they got from the 76ers via the Pelicans), they originally traded it away to the Cleveland Cavaliers back when it originally considered a first-round pick alongside the aforementioned Omri Casspi for JJ Hickson before Cleveland traded it out to the Chicago Bulls alongside Andrew Bynum, the rights to swap first-round picks with the Cavaliers, and multiple second-round picks from the Portland Trail Blazers for Luol Deng.

With Sacramento's first pick (acquired from Philadelphia), they selected De'Aaron Fox, a freshman point guard from the University of Kentucky. Under his only season with Kentucky, De'Aaron averaged 16.7 points, 4.6 assists, 3.9 rebounds, and 1.5 steals per game in 36 games played (34 started) while also earning the Southeastern Conference's Tournament MVP, the All-SEC Freshman Team honors, and All-SEC First Team honors there. As for their first-round pick that was acquired from Philadelphia, they traded that selection (who became freshman center Zach Collins from Gonzaga University) to the Portland Trail Blazers in exchange for their first two first-round picks this year. With Portland's first pick, they selected Justin Jackson, a junior small forward/shooting guard from the recent champion North Carolina University. During his time there, he would help the Tar Heels out in their quest for a redemption championship by averaging 18.3 points, 4.6 rebounds, and 2.8 assists per game out in North Carolina. He would also earn the ACC's Player of The Year Award that year, as well as be named a consensus All-American First Team member and All-ACC First Team member, as well as previously be named a member of the All-ACC Freshman Team of 2015. As for their second and final selection that was previously held under Portland's name, the Kings would select another former #1 draft prospect late in the first round, this time being freshman power forward Harry Giles from Duke University. Similar to Skal Labissière before him, Giles was also a former #1 draft prospect. However, a torn ACL his senior year of high school and other knee issues resulted in what would be considered a disappointing freshman year at Duke, averaging 3.9 points and rebounds per game (as well as 0.7 blocks and 0.4 assists and steals) in 26 games (6 of which he started in) there before declaring early. Finally, with their sole second-round pick (acquired from Philadelphia via New Orleans), Sacramento would select Frank Mason III, a senior point guard from the University of Kansas. As the consensus college basketball player of the year, Frank would average 20.9 points, 5.2 assists, 4.2 rebounds, and 1.3 steals per game in 36 games played that year for Kansas as he (alongside Josh Jackson) would help the Jayhawks compete for the NCAA Tournament that year before unfortunately losing out to Oregon University at the Elite Eight.

== Roster ==
2017–18 Sacramento Kings roster
Players

Pos.	No.	Player	Height	Weight	DOB	From
G	8	Bogdan Bogdanović	6 ft 6 in (1.98 m)	205 lb (93 kg)	1992–08–18	Serbia
F	22	Bruno Caboclo	6 ft 9 in (2.06 m)	205 lb (93 kg)	1995–09–21	Brazil
G/F	15	Vince Carter	6 ft 6 in (1.98 m)	220 lb (100 kg)	1977–01–26	North Carolina
C	00	Willie Cauley-Stein	7 ft 0 in (2.13 m)	240 lb (109 kg)	1993–08–18	Kentucky
C	45	Jack Cooley (TW)	6 ft 10 in (2.08 m)	274 lb (124 kg)	1991–04–12	Notre Dame
G	5	De'Aaron Fox	6 ft 3 in (1.91 m)	175 lb (79 kg)	1997–12–20	Kentucky
F/C	20	Harry Giles	6 ft 10 in (2.08 m)	240 lb (109 kg)	1998–04–22	Duke
F	13	Nigel Hayes	6 ft 7 in (2.01 m)	254 lb (115 kg)	1994–12–16	Wisconsin
G	24	Buddy Hield	6 ft 4 in (1.93 m)	214 lb (97 kg)	1993–12–17	Oklahoma
F	25	Justin Jackson	6 ft 8 in (2.03 m)	210 lb (95 kg)	1995–03–28	North Carolina
C	41	Kosta Koufos	7 ft 0 in (2.13 m)	265 lb (120 kg)	1989–02–24	Ohio State
F/C	7	Skal Labissière	6 ft 11 in (2.11 m)	225 lb (102 kg)	1996–03–18	Kentucky
G	10	Frank Mason	5 ft 11 in (1.80 m)	190 lb (86 kg)	1994–04–03	Kansas
F	50	Zach Randolph	6 ft 9 in (2.06 m)	250 lb (113 kg)	1981–07–16	Michigan State
F	29	JaKarr Sampson (TW)	6 ft 9 in (2.06 m)	207 lb (94 kg)	1993–03–20	St. John's
G	9	Iman Shumpert	6 ft 5 in (1.96 m)	220 lb (100 kg)	1990–06–26	Georgia Tech
G/F	17	Garrett Temple	6 ft 6 in (1.98 m)	195 lb (88 kg)	1986–05–08	LSU

Coaches
Head coach
- Dave Joerger
Assistant(s)
- Bryan Gates
- Nancy Lieberman
- Jason March
- Bob Thornton
- Duane Ticknor
- Elston Turner
- Larry Lewis (player development)

Legend
- (DP) Unsigned draft pick
- (FA) Free agent
- (S) Suspended
- (GL) On assignment to G League affiliate
- (TW) Two-way affiliate player
- Injured

Roster
Updated: 2018-02-11

== Standings ==
=== Division ===
Pacific Division	W	L	PCT	GB	Home	Road	Div	GP
y – Golden State Warriors	58	24	.707	–	29‍–‍12	29‍–‍12	13–3	82
Los Angeles Clippers	42	40	.512	16.0	22‍–‍19	20‍–‍21	12–4	82
Los Angeles Lakers	35	47	.427	23.0	20‍–‍21	15‍–‍26	6–10	82
Sacramento Kings	27	55	.329	31.0	14‍–‍27	13‍–‍28	5–11	82
Phoenix Suns	21	61	.256	37.0	10‍–‍31	11‍–‍30	4–12	82

=== Conference ===
Western Conference
#	Team	W	L	PCT	GB	GP
1	z – Houston Rockets *	65	17	.793	–	82
2	y – Golden State Warriors *	58	24	.707	7.0	82
3	y – Portland Trail Blazers *	49	33	.598	16.0	82
4	x – Oklahoma City Thunder	48	34	.585	17.0	82
5	x – Utah Jazz	48	34	.585	17.0	82
6	x – New Orleans Pelicans	48	34	.585	17.0	82
7	x – San Antonio Spurs	47	35	.573	18.0	82
8	x – Minnesota Timberwolves	47	35	.573	18.0	82
9	Denver Nuggets	46	36	.561	19.0	82
10	Los Angeles Clippers	42	40	.512	23.0	82
11	Los Angeles Lakers	35	47	.427	30.0	82
12	Sacramento Kings	27	55	.329	38.0	82
13	Dallas Mavericks	24	58	.293	41.0	82
14	Memphis Grizzlies	22	60	.268	43.0	82
15	Phoenix Suns	21	61	.256	44.0	82

== Game log ==
=== Preseason ===
2017 pre-season game log
Total: 1–5 (Home: 1–1; Road: 0–4)
Pre-season: 1–5 (home: 1–1; road: 0–4)

Game	Date	Team	Score	High points	High rebounds	High assists	Location Attendance	Record
1	October 2	San Antonio	W 106–100	Frank Mason III (17)	Frank Mason III (6)	George Hill (5)	Golden 1 Center; 16,000	1–0
2	October 6	@ San Antonio	L 93–113	Willie Cauley-Stein (14)	Willie Cauley-Stein (9)	De'Aaron Fox (6)	AT&T Center; 18,082	1–1
3	October 8	@ LA Lakers	L 69–75	Zach Randolph (16)	George Hill (8)	Bogdanovic, Hill, Randolph (3)	T-Mobile Arena; 13,094	1–2
4	October 9	Portland	L 83–97	Justin Jackson (16)	Willie Cauley-Stein (8)	Marcus Williams (5)	Golden 1 Center; N/A	1–3
5	October 12	@ L.A. Clippers	L 87–104	Zach Randolph (14)	Kosta Koufos (10)	Frank Mason III (4)	Staples Center; 11,225	1–4
6	October 13	@ Golden State	L 106–117	David Stockton (23)	Skal Labissière (8)	David Stockton (8)	Oracle Arena; 19,596	1–5

2017–18 season schedule

=== Regular season ===
2017–18 game log
Total: 27–55 (Home: 14–27; Road: 13–28)
October: 1–6 (home: 0–3; road: 1–3)

Game	Date	Team	Score	High points	High rebounds	High assists	Location Attendance	Record
1	October 18	Houston	L 100–105	Willie Cauley-Stein (21)	Cauley-Stein, Labissière (10)	De'Aaron Fox (5)	Golden 1 Center; 17,583	0–1
2	October 20	@ Dallas	W 93–88	George Hill (21)	Willie Cauley-Stein (11)	De'Aaron Fox (10)	American Airlines Center; 19,273	1–1
3	October 21	@ Denver	L 79–96	De'Aaron Fox (18)	Zach Randolph (9)	Skal Labissière (4)	Pepsi Center; 19,520	1–2
4	October 23	@ Phoenix	L 115–117	Garrett Temple (23)	Kosta Koufos (9)	Fox, Hill, Cauley-Stein (4)	Talking Stick Resort Arena; 14,903	1–3
5	October 26	New Orleans	L 106–114	De'Aaron Fox (14)	Zach Randolph (9)	Fox, Hill (5)	Golden 1 Center; 17,583	1–4
6	October 29	Washington	L 83–110	Frank Mason III (11)	Willie Cauley-Stein (9)	De'Aaron Fox (5)	Golden 1 Center; 17,583	1–5
7	October 31	@ Indiana	L 83–101	De'Aaron Fox (18)	Skal Labissière (8)	De'Aaron Fox (5)	Bankers Life Fieldhouse; 12,245	1–6

November : 5–9 (home: 4–3; road: 1–6)

Game	Date	Team	Score	High points	High rebounds	High assists	Location Attendance	Record
8	November 1	@ Boston	L 86–113	Zach Randolph (16)	Buddy Hield (7)	De'Aaron Fox (6)	TD Garden; 18,624	1–7
9	November 4	@ Detroit	L 99–108	Zach Randolph (19)	Buddy Hield (8)	Frank Mason III (6)	Little Caesars Arena; 17,683	1–8
10	November 7	Oklahoma City	W 94–86	Buddy Hield (21)	Zach Randolph (8)	De'Aaron Fox (8)	Golden 1 Center; 17,583	2–8
11	November 9	Philadelphia	W 109–108	Zach Randolph (20)	Kosta Koufos (12)	Fox, Hill (7)	Golden 1 Center; 17,583	3–8
12	November 11	@ New York	L 91–118	Buddy Hield (17)	Kosta Koufos (10)	Buddy Hield (4)	Madison Square Garden; 19,812	3–9
13	November 13	@ Washington	L 92–110	George Hill (16)	Zach Randolph (8)	De'Aaron Fox (5)	Capital One Arena; 14,660	3–10
14	November 15	@ Atlanta	L 80–126	Zach Randolph (16)	Jackson, Koufos, Randolph (4)	Cauley-Stein, Temple (3)	Philips Arena; 13,860	3–11
15	November 17	Portland	W 86–82	Willie Cauley-Stein (22)	Willie Cauley-Stein (10)	De'Aaron Fox (4)	Golden 1 Center; 17,583	4–11
16	November 18	@ Portland	L 90–102	Willie Cauley-Stein (18)	Willie Cauley-Stein (9)	Bogdan Bogdanovic (3)	Moda Center; 19,522	4–12
17	November 20	Denver	L 98–114	Hill, Koufos (16)	Zach Randolph (6)	De'Aaron Fox (5)	Golden 1 Center; 17,583	4–13
18	November 22	LA Lakers	W 113–102	Willie Cauley-Stein (26)	Skal Labissière (8)	Bogdanovic, Mason III, Randolph (7)	Golden 1 Center; 17,583	5–13
19	November 25	LA Clippers	L 95–97	Buddy Hield (27)	Zach Randolph (7)	Fox, Hill, Randolph, Cauley-Stein (3)	Golden 1 Center; 17,583	5–14
20	November 27	@ Golden State	W 110–106	Willie Cauley-Stein (19)	Willie Cauley-Stein (8)	Willie Cauley-Stein (6)	Oracle Arena; 19,596	6–14
21	November 28	Milwaukee	L 87–112	Garrett Temple (18)	Willie Cauley-Stein (10)	Frank Mason (7)	Golden 1 Center; 17,583	6–15

December : 6–9 (home: 2–4; road: 4–5)

Game	Date	Team	Score	High points	High rebounds	High assists	Location Attendance	Record
22	December 1	@ Chicago	W 107–106	Zach Randolph (25)	Zach Randolph (13)	Willie Cauley-Stein (5)	United Center; 19,268	7–15
23	December 2	@ Milwaukee	L 104–109	Zach Randolph (22)	Zach Randolph (7)	Buddy Hield (4)	Bradley Center; 15,581	7–16
24	December 6	@ Cleveland	L 95–101	Zach Randolph (18)	JaKarr Sampson (16)	Zach Randolph (6)	Quicken Loans Arena; 20,562	7–17
25	December 8	@ New Orleans	W 116–109 (OT)	Zach Randolph (35)	Zach Randolph (13)	De'Aaron Fox (4)	Smoothie King Center; 15,019	8–17
26	December 10	Toronto	L 87–102	Zach Randolph (19)	Zach Randolph (11)	Jackson, Mason III (3)	Golden 1 Center; 17,583	8–18
27	December 12	Phoenix	W 99–92	George Hill (18)	Kosta Koufos (8)	Zach Randolph (5)	Golden 1 Center; 17,583	9–18
28	December 14	@ Minnesota	L 96–119	George Hill (16)	Zach Randolph (9)	Frank Mason (4)	Target Center; 11,126	9–19
29	December 17	@ Toronto	L 93–108	Bogdanovic, Temple (18)	Koufos, Cauley-Stein (6)	Bogdanovic, Hill (5)	Air Canada Centre; 19,800	9–20
30	December 19	@ Philadelphia	W 101–95	Zach Randolph (27)	Garrett Temple (8)	Garrett Temple (4)	Wells Fargo Center; 20,558	10–20
31	December 20	@ Brooklyn	W 104–99	George Hill (22)	Willie Cauley-Stein (9)	George Hill (4)	Barclays Center; 13,179	11–20
32	December 23	San Antonio	L 99–108	Buddy Hield (24)	Willie Cauley-Stein (11)	George Hill (6)	Golden 1 Center; 17,583	11–21
33	December 26	@ LA Clippers	L 95–122	Willie Cauley-Stein (17)	Willie Cauley-Stein (7)	George Hill (5)	Staples Center; 16,393	11–22
34	December 27	Cleveland	W 109–95	Vince Carter (24)	Willie Cauley-Stein (9)	Bogdan Bogdanovic (8)	Golden 1 Center; 17,583	12–22
35	December 29	Phoenix	L 101–111	Zach Randolph (14)	Willie Cauley-Stein (9)	Mason, Temple (5)	Golden 1 Center; 17,583	12–23
36	December 31	Memphis	L 96–114	Willie Cauley-Stein (21)	Willie Cauley-Stein (8)	Bogdan Bogdanovic (5)	Golden 1 Center; 17,583	12–24

January : 4–10 (home: 1–4; road: 3–6)

Game	Date	Team	Score	High points	High rebounds	High assists	Location Attendance	Record
37	January 2	Charlotte	L 111–131	Zach Randolph (24)	Skal Labissière (15)	Bogdan Bogdanovic (5)	Golden 1 Center; 17,583	12–25
38	January 6	Denver	W 106–98	De'Aaron Fox (18)	Vince Carter (8)	De'Aaron Fox (7)	Golden 1 Center; 17,583	13–25
39	January 8	San Antonio	L 100–107	Willie Cauley-Stein (22)	Willie Cauley-Stein (9)	De'Aaron Fox (10)	Golden 1 Center; 17,583	13–26
40	January 9	@ LA Lakers	L 86–99	Bogdan Bogdanovic (19)	Kosta Koufos (15)	Bogdan Bogdanovic (4)	Staples Center; 18,997	13–27
41	January 11	LA Clippers	L 115–121	Bogdan Bogdanovic (22)	Kosta Koufos (14)	De'Aaron Fox (6)	Golden 1 Center; 17,583	13–28
42	January 13	@ LA Clippers	L 105–126	Willie Cauley-Stein (23)	Willie Cauley-Stein (13)	De'Aaron Fox (10)	Staples Center; 16,656	13–29
43	January 15	@ Oklahoma City	L 88–95	Buddy Hield (16)	Labissière, Cauley-Stein (7)	De'Aaron Fox (5)	Chesapeake Energy Arena; 18,203	13–30
44	January 17	Utah	L 105–120	Willie Cauley-Stein (26)	Willie Cauley-Stein (10)	George Hill (5)	Golden 1 Center; 17,583	13–31
45	January 19	@ Memphis	L 88–106	De'Aaron Fox (16)	Willie Cauley-Stein (11)	De'Aaron Fox (6)	FedExForum; 16,831	13–32
46	January 22	@ Charlotte	L 107–112	Skal Labissière (23)	Willie Cauley-Stein (10)	Bogdanovic, Fox (7)	Spectrum Center; 11,806	13–33
47	January 23	@ Orlando	W 105–99	Garrett Temple (34)	Labissière, Cauley-Stein (9)	Vince Carter (6)	Amway Center; 18,846	14–33
48	January 25	@ Miami	W 89–88	Buddy Hield (24)	Zach Randolph (10)	De'Aaron Fox (4)	American Airlines Arena; 19,600	15–33
49	January 28	@ San Antonio	L 98–113	De'Aaron Fox (26)	Kosta Koufos (12)	Zach Randolph (6)	AT&T Center; 18,418	15–34
50	January 30	@ New Orleans	W 114–103	Zach Randolph (26)	Kosta Koufos (17)	Garrett Temple (6)	Smoothie King Center; 14,292	16–34

February : 2–9 (home: 1–6; road: 1–3)

Game	Date	Team	Score	High points	High rebounds	High assists	Location Attendance	Record
51	February 2	Golden State	L 104–119	Zach Randolph (18)	Zach Randolph (7)	Bogdanovic, Fox (6)	Golden 1 Center; 16,583	16–35
52	February 3	Dallas	L 99–106	De'Aaron Fox (15)	Willie Cauley-Stein (8)	Bogdan Bogdanovic (6)	Golden 1 Center; 17,583	16–36
53	February 5	Chicago	W 104–98	Bogdan Bogdanovic (15)	Zach Randolph (9)	George Hill (5)	Golden 1 Center; 17,583	17–36
54	February 9	Portland	L 100–118	Willie Cauley-Stein (19)	Zach Randolph (9)	De'Aaron Fox (9)	Golden 1 Center; 17,583	17–37
55	February 11	@ Minnesota	L 106–111	De'Aaron Fox (23)	Kosta Koufos (10)	Bogdan Bogdanovic (8)	Target Center; 18,068	17–38
56	February 13	@ Dallas	W 114–109	Zach Randolph (22)	Koufos, Randolph (7)	Carter, Fox (7)	American Airlines Center; 19,801	18–38
57	February 14	@ Houston	L 91–100	Bogdan Bogdanovic (20)	Koufos, Cauley-Stein (8)	Bogdanovic, Cauley-Stein (5)	Toyota Center; 18,055	18–39
58	February 22	Oklahoma City	L 107–110	Zach Randolph (29)	Zach Randolph (12)	Garrett Temple (5)	Golden 1 Center; 17,583	18–40
59	February 24	LA Lakers	L 108–113	Bogdanovic, Hield (21)	Willie Cauley-Stein (13)	Fox, Mason III (6)	Golden 1 Center; 17,583	18–41
60	February 26	Minnesota	L 100–118	Skal Labissière (20)	Hield, Cauley-Stein (5)	Bogdan Bogdanovic (6)	Golden 1 Center; 17,583	18–42
61	February 27	@ Portland	L 99–116	Zach Randolph (20)	Willie Cauley-Stein (10)	De'Aaron Fox (8)	Moda Center; 19,468	18–43

March : 6–10 (home: 5–7; road: 1–3)

Game	Date	Team	Score	High points	High rebounds	High assists	Location Attendance	Record
62	March 1	Brooklyn	W 116–111 (OT)	Bogdan Bogdanovic (23)	Kosta Koufos (11)	Willie Cauley-Stein (6)	Golden 1 Center; 17,583	19–43
63	March 3	Utah	L 91–98	De'Aaron Fox (17)	Skal Labissière (12)	Fox, Jackson, Koufos, Labissière (3)	Golden 1 Center; 17,583	19–44
64	March 4	NY Knicks	W 102–99	Bogdan Bogdanovic (22)	Kosta Koufos (8)	Bogdan Bogdanovic (7)	Golden 1 Center; 17,583	20–44
65	March 7	New Orleans	L 101–114	Buddy Hield (20)	Kosta Koufos (10)	Frank Mason III (6)	Golden 1 Center; 17,583	20–45
66	March 9	Orlando	W 94–88	Garrett Temple (23)	Kosta Koufos (13)	Bogdan Bogdanovic (10)	Golden 1 Center; 17,583	21–45
67	March 11	@ Denver	L 104–130	Buddy Hield (18)	Kosta Koufos (10)	De'Aaron Fox (9)	Pepsi Center; 19,520	21–46
68	March 12	@ Oklahoma City	L 101–106	Bogdan Bogdanovic (19)	Kosta Koufos (10)	De'Aaron Fox (10)	Chesapeake Energy Arena; 18,203	21–47
69	March 14	Miami	W 123–119 (OT)	Buddy Hield (24)	Zach Randolph (9)	Zach Randolph (4)	Golden 1 Center; 17,583	22–47
70	March 16	@ Golden State	W 98–93	Buddy Hield (22)	Kosta Koufos (12)	Buddy Hield (7)	Oracle Arena; 19,596	23–47
71	March 17	@ Utah	L 97–103	Buddy Hield (23)	Hield, Koufos, Mason III (6)	Buddy Hield (6)	Vivint Smart Home Arena; 18,306	23–48
72	March 19	Detroit	L 90–106	Buddy Hield (20)	Hield, Cauley-Stein (6)	Willie Cauley-Stein (5)	Golden 1 Center; 17,583	23–49
73	March 22	Atlanta	W 105–90	Justin Jackson (20)	Kosta Koufos (11)	Frank Mason III (8)	Golden 1 Center; 17,583	24–49
74	March 25	Boston	L 93–104	Buddy Hield (21)	Kosta Koufos (9)	Mason III, Cauley-Stein (4)	Golden 1 Center; 17,583	24–50
75	March 27	Dallas	L 97–103	Skal Labissière (19)	Jackson, Labissière (8)	De'Aaron Fox (6)	Golden 1 Center; 17,583	24–51
76	March 29	Indiana	L 103–106	Bogdan Bogdanovic (21)	Hield, Cauley-Stein (7)	Fox, Cauley-Stein (5)	Golden 1 Center; 17,583	24–52
77	March 31	Golden State	L 96–112	Buddy Hield (19)	Willie Cauley-Stein (8)	De'Aaron Fox (8)	Golden 1 Center; 17,583	24–53

April : 3–2 (home: 1–0; road: 2–2)

Game	Date	Team	Score	High points	High rebounds	High assists	Location Attendance	Record
78	April 1	@ LA Lakers	W 84–83	Buddy Hield (19)	Skal Labissière (9)	De'Aaron Fox (6)	Staples Center; 18,997	25–53
79	April 3	@ Phoenix	L 94–97	Bogdan Bogdanovic (22)	De'Aaron Fox (9)	De'Aaron Fox (5)	Talking Stick Resort Arena; 16,826	25–54
80	April 6	@ Memphis	W 94–93	Willie Cauley-Stein (18)	Willie Cauley-Stein (8)	Buddy Hield (6)	FedExForum; 16,527	26–54
81	April 9	@ San Antonio	L 85–98	Willie Cauley-Stein (25)	Willie Cauley-Stein (10)	De'Aaron Fox (7)	AT&T Center; 18,418	26–55
82	April 11	Houston	W 96–83	Willie Cauley-Stein (22)	Willie Cauley-Stein (11)	Bogdanovic, Hield (5)	Golden 1 Center; 17,583	27–55

2017–18 season schedule

== Player statistics ==
Legend
GP	Games played	GS	Games started	MPG	Minutes per game
FG%	Field-goal percentage	3P%	3-point field-goal percentage	FT%	Free-throw percentage
RPG	Rebounds per game	APG	Assists per game	SPG	Steals per game
BPG	Blocks per game	PPG	Points per game

=== Regular season ===
Player	GP	GS	MPG	FG%	3P%	FT%	RPG	APG	SPG	BPG	PPG
Buddy Hield	80	13	25.3	.446	.431	.877	3.8	1.9	1.1	.3	13.5
Bogdan Bogdanović	78	52	27.9	.446	.392	.840	2.9	3.3	.9	.2	11.8
De'Aaron Fox	73	61	27.8	.412	.307	.723	2.8	4.4	1.0	.3	11.6
Willie Cauley-Stein	73	57	28.0	.502	.250	.619	7.0	2.4	1.1	.9	12.8
Kosta Koufos	71	12	19.6	.571		.446	6.6	1.2	.7	.5	6.7
Justin Jackson	68	41	22.1	.442	.308	.722	2.8	1.1	.4	.2	6.7
Garrett Temple	65	35	24.8	.418	.392	.769	2.3	1.9	.9	.4	8.4
Skal Labissière	60	29	20.7	.448	.353	.805	4.8	1.2	.4	.8	8.7
Zach Randolph	59	58	25.6	.473	.347	.785	6.7	2.2	.7	.2	14.5
Vince Carter	58	4	17.7	.403	.345	.757	2.6	1.2	.7	.4	5.4
Frank Mason III	52	2	18.9	.379	.360	.817	2.5	2.8	.7	.2	7.9
George Hill^{†}	43	36	26.6	.469	.453	.778	2.7	2.8	.9	.3	10.3
Malachi Richardson^{†}	25	4	12.8	.330	.308	.773	1.3	.5	.4	.0	3.5
JaKarr Sampson	22	6	15.6	.543	.500	.625	3.5	.4	.4	1.0	4.7
Georgios Papagiannis^{†}	16	0	7.4	.415			2.3	.6	.1	.4	2.1
Bruno Caboclo^{†}	10	0	10.0	.310	.200	.833	2.1	.3	.2	.4	2.6
Jack Cooley	7	0	12.4	.481		.737	4.3	.9	.1	.0	5.7
Nigel Hayes-Davis^{†}	5	0	21.0	.286	.167	.000	4.4	.8	.4	.6	3.6

- ^{†} Denotes player spent time with another team in the season. Stats reflect time with the Kings only.

== Transactions ==
=== Trades ===
June 22, 2017	To Sacramento Kings Draft rights to Justin Jackson (Pick 15); Draft rights to Harry Giles (Pick 20)	To Portland Trail Blazers Draft right to Zach Collins (Pick 10)
July 14, 2017	To Sacramento Kings 2019 second-round pick Cash considerations	To New York Knicks Scott Perry (general manager)
February 8, 2018
February 8, 2018	To Cleveland Cavaliers Rodney Hood (from Utah); George Hill (from Sacramento); Draft rights to Artūras Gudaitis (from Sacramento)	To Sacramento Kings Joe Johnson (from Utah); Iman Shumpert (from Cleveland); 2020 second-round pick (from Miami via Cleveland); Draft rights to Dimitrios Agravanis (from Cleveland); Cash considerations (from Cleveland and Utah)
February 8, 2018	To Utah Jazz Jae Crowder (from Cleveland); Derrick Rose (from Cleveland); Right to swap 2024 second-round picks with Cleveland

=== Free agency ===
==== Additions ====
Player	Signed	Former team
Vince Carter	July 10, 2017	Memphis Grizzlies
George Hill	July 10, 2017	Utah Jazz
Zach Randolph	July 10, 2017	Memphis Grizzlies
Bogdan Bogdanović	July 13, 2017	(Turkey) Fenerbahçe (Doğuş)
Jack Cooley	Two-way contract	(Germany) MHP Riesen Ludwigsburg
JaKarr Sampson	Two-way contract	Iowa Energy (G League)

==== Subtractions ====
Player	Reason left	New team
Anthony Tolliver	Waived	Detroit Pistons
Arron Afflalo	Waived	Orlando Magic
Tyreke Evans	1-year contract worth $3.3 million	Memphis Grizzlies
Ben McLemore	2-year contract worth $10.7 million	Memphis Grizzlies
Ty Lawson	1-year contract worth $2.4 million	Shandong Golden Stars
Georgios Papagiannis	Waived	Portland Trail Blazers

== Awards ==
Player	Award	Date awarded	Ref.
Bogdan Bogdanović	NBA All-Rookie Second Team	May 22, 2018	
