= 2014–15 Utah Jazz season =

NBA professional basketball team season

- Head coach: Quin Snyder
- Arena: EnergySolutions Arena

Results
- Record: 38–44 (.463)
- Place: Division: 3rd (Northwest); Conference: 11th (Western)
- Playoff finish: Did not qualify
- Stats at Basketball Reference

Local media
- Television: Root Sports Utah
- Radio: 1280 and 97.5 The Zone

The 2014–15 Utah Jazz season is the franchise's 41st season in the National Basketball Association (NBA), and the 36th season of the franchise in Salt Lake City. On March 27, 2015, the Jazz were eliminated from playoff contention for the 3rd consecutive season following a 107–91 loss to the Denver Nuggets.

== Preseason ==
=== Draft picks ===
Round	Pick	Player	Position	Nationality	College
1	5	Dante Exum	SG	Australia	Australian Institute of Sport
1	23	Rodney Hood	SG	United States	Duke
2	35	Jarnell Stokes	PF	United States	Tennessee

== Roster ==
2014–15 Utah Jazz roster
Players

Pos.	No.	Player	Height	Weight	DOB	From
F	33	Trevor Booker	6 ft 8 in (2.03 m)	240 lb (109 kg)	1987–11–25	Clemson
G	3	Trey Burke	6 ft 1 in (1.85 m)	190 lb (86 kg)	1992–11–12	Michigan
G	10	Alec Burks	6 ft 6 in (1.98 m)	211 lb (96 kg)	1991–07–20	Colorado
F	45	Jack Cooley	6 ft 9 in (2.06 m)	246 lb (112 kg)	1991–10–04	Notre Dame
G	8	Bryce Cotton	6 ft 0 in (1.83 m)	163 lb (74 kg)	1992–08–11	Providence
F	40	Jeremy Evans	6 ft 9 in (2.06 m)	197 lb (89 kg)	1987–10–24	Western Kentucky
G	11	Dante Exum	6 ft 6 in (1.98 m)	190 lb (86 kg)	1995–07–13	Lake Ginninderra (AUS)
F/C	15	Derrick Favors	6 ft 10 in (2.08 m)	268 lb (122 kg)	1991–07–15	Georgia Tech
C	27	Rudy Gobert	7 ft 2 in (2.18 m)	245 lb (111 kg)	1992–06–26	France
G/F	20	Gordon Hayward	6 ft 8 in (2.03 m)	220 lb (100 kg)	1990–03–23	Butler
F	5	Rodney Hood	6 ft 8 in (2.03 m)	215 lb (98 kg)	1992–10–20	Duke
G/F	2	Joe Ingles	6 ft 8 in (2.03 m)	216 lb (98 kg)	1987–10–02	Lake Ginninderra (AUS)
F	17	Grant Jerrett	6 ft 10 in (2.08 m)	232 lb (105 kg)	1993–07–08	Arizona
G/F	23	Chris Johnson	6 ft 6 in (1.98 m)	201 lb (91 kg)	1990–04–29	Dayton
G/F	13	Elijah Millsap	6 ft 6 in (1.98 m)	215 lb (98 kg)	1987–08–12	UAB

Coaches
Head coach
- Quin Snyder
Assistant(s)
- Johnnie Bryant
- Alex Jensen
- Brad Jones
- Antonio Lang
- Mike Wells
- Mark McKown (player development)

Legend
- (DP) Unsigned draft pick
- (FA) Free agent
- (S) Suspended
- (DL) On assignment to D-League affiliate
- Injured

Roster
Updated: 2015–04–06

== Regular season ==
=== Standings ===
Northwest Division	W	L	PCT	GB	Home	Road	Div	GP
y-Portland Trail Blazers	51	31	.622	–	32‍–‍9	19‍–‍22	11–5	82
Oklahoma City Thunder	45	37	.549	6.0	29‍–‍12	16‍–‍25	10–6	82
Utah Jazz	38	44	.463	13.0	21‍–‍20	17‍–‍24	9–7	82
Denver Nuggets	30	52	.366	21.0	19‍–‍22	11‍–‍30	6–10	82
Minnesota Timberwolves	16	66	.195	35.0	9‍–‍32	7‍–‍34	4–12	82

Western Conference
#	Team	W	L	PCT	GB	GP
1	z-Golden State Warriors *	67	15	.817	–	82
2	y-Houston Rockets *	56	26	.683	11.0	82
3	x-Los Angeles Clippers	56	26	.683	11.0	82
4	y-Portland Trail Blazers *	51	31	.622	16.0	82
5	x-Memphis Grizzlies	55	27	.671	12.0	82
6	x-San Antonio Spurs	55	27	.671	12.0	82
7	x-Dallas Mavericks	50	32	.610	17.0	82
8	x-New Orleans Pelicans	45	37	.549	22.0	82
9	Oklahoma City Thunder	45	37	.549	22.0	82
10	Phoenix Suns	39	43	.476	28.0	82
11	Utah Jazz	38	44	.463	29.0	82
12	Denver Nuggets	30	52	.366	37.0	82
13	Sacramento Kings	29	53	.354	38.0	82
14	Los Angeles Lakers	21	61	.256	46.0	82
15	Minnesota Timberwolves	16	66	.195	51.0	82

== Game log ==
=== Preseason ===
2014 pre-season game log
Total: 5–3 (Home: 3–1; Road: 2–2)
Pre-season: 5–3 (home: 3–1; road: 2–2)

Game	Date	Team	Score	High points	High rebounds	High assists	Location Attendance	Record
1	October 7	Portland	W 92–73	Alec Burks (12)	Favors & Gobert (11)	Trey Burke (4)	EnergySolutions Arena; 17,858	1–0
2	October 9	Portland	W 109–105	Trey Burke (22)	Enes Kanter (10)	Trey Burke (7)	Moda Center; 14,468	2–0
3	October 13	L.A. Clippers	W 102–89	Trey Burke (16)	Rudy Gobert (20)	Trey Burke (8)	EnergySolutions Arena; 19,319	3–0
4	October 16	@ L.A. Lakers	W 119–86	Gordon Hayward (16)	Enes Kanter (11)	Exum & Burke (6)	Honda Center; 8,931	4–0
5	October 17	@ L.A. Clippers	L 97–101	Gordon Hayward (22)	Derrick Favors (10)	Trey Burke (6)	Staples Center; 17,733	4–1
6	October 19	@ L.A. Lakers	L 91–98	Alec Burks (21)	Rudy Gobert (10)	Dante Exum (5)	Staples Center; 17,733	4–2
7	October 19	@ Oklahoma City	W 105–91	Enes Kanter (27)	Derrick Favors (15)	Gordon Hayward (6)	Chesapeake Energy Arena	5–2
8	October 24	Phoenix	L 100–105	Gordon Hayward (24)	Booker, Hood & Gobert (8)	Hayward & Gobert (3)	EnergySolutions Arena; 18,087	5–3

2014–15 season schedule

=== Regular season ===
2014–15 game log
Total: 38–44 (Home: 21–20; Road: 17–24)
October: 0–2 (home: 0–1; road: 0–1)

Game	Date	Team	Score	High points	High rebounds	High assists	Location Attendance	Record
1	October 29	Houston	L 93–104	Alec Burks (18)	Gordon Hayward (8)	Gordon Hayward (7)	EnergySolutions Arena; 19,911	0–1
2	October 30	@ Dallas	L 102–120	Derrick Favors (17)	Derrick Favors (11)	Trey Burke (7)	American Airlines Center; 19,697	0–2

November : 5–10 (home: 3–4; road: 2–6)

Game	Date	Team	Score	High points	High rebounds	High assists	Location Attendance	Record
3	November 1	Phoenix	W 118–91	Derrick Favors (32)	Gordon Hayward (10)	Trey Burke (4)	EnergySolutions Arena; 17,721	1–2
4	November 3	@ L.A. Clippers	L 101–107	Gordon Hayward (27)	Enes Kanter (9)	Gordon Hayward (5)	Staples Center; 19,060	1–3
5	November 5	Cleveland	W 102–100	Favors & Hayward (21)	Derrick Favors (10)	Gordon Hayward (7)	EnergySolutions Arena; 19,911	2–3
6	November 7	Dallas	L 82–105	Alec Burks (14)	Enes Kanter (10)	Dante Exum (5)	EnergySolutions Arena; 18,419	2–4
7	November 9	@ Detroit	W 97–96	Gordon Hayward (17)	Derrick Favors (12)	Dante Exum (5)	Palace of Auburn Hills; 12,888	3–4
8	November 10	@ Indiana	L 86–97	Gordon Hayward (30)	Gordon Hayward (8)	Trey Burke (8)	Bankers Life Fieldhouse; 12,513	3–5
9	November 12	@ Atlanta	L 97–100	Alec Burks (22)	Gordon Hayward (7)	Trey Burke (11)	Philips Arena; 12,595	3–6
10	November 14	@ New York	W 102–100	Gordon Hayward (33)	Derrick Favors (12)	Trey Burke (8)	Madison Square Garden; 19,812	4–6
11	November 15	@ Toronto	L 93–111	Favors & Kanter (18)	Alec Burks (10)	Hayward & Burke (5)	Air Canada Centre; 19,800	4–7
12	November 18	Oklahoma City	W 98–81	Alec Burks (20)	Enes Kanter (15)	Trey Burke (9)	EnergySolutions Arena; 17,190	5–7
13	November 21	@ Golden State	L 88–101	Enes Kanter (18)	Derrick Favors (9)	Ingles, Exum & Burke (5)	Oracle Arena; 19,596	5–8
14	November 22	New Orleans	L 94–106	Gordon Hayward (31)	Derrick Favors (11)	Trey Burke (4)	EnergySolutions Arena; 18,452	5–9
15	November 24	Chicago	L 95–97	Derrick Favors (21)	Derrick Favors (15)	Trey Burke (10)	EnergySolutions Arena; 18,904	5–10
16	November 26	@ Oklahoma City	L 82–97	Gordon Hayward (21)	Gordon Hayward (8)	Burke & Burks (4)	Chesapeake Energy Arena; 18,203	5–11
17	November 29	L.A. Clippers	L 96–112	Gordon Hayward (30)	Trevor Booker (9)	Alec Burks (4)	EnergySolutions Arena; 18,479	5–12

December : 6–9 (home: 3–4; road: 3–5)

Game	Date	Team	Score	High points	High rebounds	High assists	Location Attendance	Record
18	December 1	Denver	L 101–103	Gordon Hayward (25)	Enes Kanter (15)	Trey Burke (8)	EnergySolutions Arena; 16,768	5–13
19	December 3	Toronto	L 104–123	Favors & Kanter (19)	Enes Kanter (9)	Trey Burke (8)	EnergySolutions Arena; 16,677	5–14
20	December 5	Orlando	L 93–98	Derrick Favors (21)	Derrick Favors (13)	Trey Burke (11)	EnergySolutions Arena; 18,997	5–15
21	December 8	@ Sacramento	L 92–101	Gordon Hayward (19)	Rudy Gobert (9)	Gordon Hayward (7)	Sleep Train Arena; 16,511	5–16
22	December 9	San Antonio	W 100–96	Derrick Favors (21)	Enes Kanter (15)	Hayward & Burks (4)	EnergySolutions Arena; 18,382	6–16
23	December 12	Miami	L 95–100	Enes Kanter (25)	Rudy Gobert (11)	Burke & Gobert (4)	EnergySolutions Arena; 19,911	6–17
24	December 14	@ Washington	L 84–93	Alec Burks (19)	Enes Kanter (11)	Gordon Hayward (3)	Verizon Center; 15,220	6–18
25	December 16	@ New Orleans	L 111–119	Enes Kanter (29)	Rudy Gobert (9)	Gordon Hayward (5)	Smoothie King Center; 13,179	6–19
26	December 17	@ Miami	W 105–87	Gordon Hayward (29)	Rudy Gobert (9)	Gordon Hayward (7)	American Airlines Arena; 19,633	7–19
27	December 19	@ Orlando	W 101–94	Derrick Favors (23)	Derrick Favors (10)	Gordon Hayward (6)	Amway Center; 16,032	8–19
28	December 20	@ Charlotte	L 86–104	Gordon Hayward (14)	Rudy Gobert (12)	Gordon Hayward (6)	Time Warner Cable Arena; 17,384	8–20
29	December 22	@ Memphis	W 97–91	Alec Burks (23)	Rudy Gobert (16)	Hayward, Burks, Burke & Hood (4)	FedExForum; 16,991	9–20
30	December 27	Philadelphia	W 88–71	Favors & Burke (17)	Derrick Favors (15)	Trey Burke (4)	EnergySolutions Arena; 18,890	10–20
31	December 29	@ L.A. Clippers	L 97–101	Gordon Hayward (22)	Rudy Gobert (13)	Gordon Hayward (7)	Staples Center; 19,060	10–21
32	December 30	Minnesota	W 100–94	Hayward & Burke (26)	Enes Kanter (12)	Trey Burke (6)	EnergySolutions Arena; 18,947	11–21

January : 6–9 (home: 3–5; road: 3–4)

Game	Date	Team	Score	High points	High rebounds	High assists	Location Attendance	Record
33	January 2	Atlanta	L 92–98	Gordon Hayward (18)	Derrick Favors (11)	Trey Burke (5)	EnergySolutions Arena; 19,029	11–22
34	January 3	@ Minnesota	W 101–89	Trey Burke (28)	Trevor Booker (15)	Burke & Booker (6)	Target Center; 13,702	12–22
35	January 5	Indiana	L 101–105	Derrick Favors (27)	Derrick Favors (11)	Joe Ingles (7)	EnergySolutions Arena; 17,378	12–23
36	January 7	@ Chicago	W 97–77	Derrick Favors (20)	Rudy Gobert (14)	Gordon Hayward (5)	United Center; 21,379	13–23
37	January 9	@ Oklahoma City	L 94–99	Gordon Hayward (27)	Derrick Favors (11)	Ingles & Burke (5)	Chesapeake Energy Arena; 18,203	13–24
38	January 10	@ Houston	L 82–97	Burke & Kanter (16)	Derrick Favors (7)	Gordon Hayward (5)	Toyota Center; 18,235	13–25
39	January 13	Golden State	L 105–116	Derrick Favors (22)	Favors & Gobert (11)	Trey Burke (5)	EnergySolutions Arena; 19,911	13–26
40	January 16	L.A. Lakers	W 94–85	Gordon Hayward (31)	Derrick Favors (10)	Gordon Hayward (7)	EnergySolutions Arena; 19,911	14–26
41	January 18	@ San Antonio	L 69–89	Rudy Gobert (13)	Rudy Gobert (18)	Trey Burke (8)	AT&T Center; 18,581	14–27
42	January 21	@ Cleveland	L 92–106	Enes Kanter (24)	Enes Kanter (17)	Dante Exum (5)	Quicken Loans Arena; 20,562	14–28
43	January 22	@ Milwaukee	W 101–99	Gordon Hayward (24)	Enes Kanter (16)	Joe Ingles (7)	BMO Harris Bradley Center; 12,415	15–28
44	January 24	Brooklyn	W 108–73	Gordon Hayward (24)	Rudy Gobert (11)	Joe Ingles (5)	Barclays Center; 19,352	16–28
45	January 26	Boston	L 90–99	Gordon Hayward (26)	Rudy Gobert (10)	Joe Ingles (5)	EnergySolutions Arena; 18,947	16–29
46	January 28	L.A. Clippers	L 89–94	Enes Kanter (21)	Enes Kanter (11)	Joe Ingles (5)	EnergySolutions Arena; 16,322	16–30
47	January 30	Golden State	W 110–100	Gordon Hayward (26)	Gordon Hayward (15)	Trey Burke (7)	EnergySolutions Arena; 19,295	17–30

February : 6–5 (home: 4–2; road: 2–3)

Game	Date	Team	Score	High points	High rebounds	High assists	Location Attendance	Record
48	February 3	@ Portland	L 102–103	Gordon Hayward (27)	Rudy Gobert (15)	Trey Burke (6)	Moda Center; 19,441	17–31
49	February 4	Memphis	L 90–100	Trey Burke (21)	Enes Kanter (10)	Dante Exum (5)	EnergySolutions Arena; 19,911	17–32
50	February 6	@ Phoenix	L 93–100	Gordon Hayward (24)	Rudy Gobert (12)	Gordon Hayward (5)	US Airways Center; 18,055	17–33
51	February 7	Sacramento	W 102–90	Gordon Hayward (30)	Enes Kanter (13)	Derrick Favors (5)	EnergySolutions Arena; 19,128	18–33
52	February 9	@ New Orleans	W 100–96	Gordon Hayward (32)	Enes Kanter (11)	Gordon Hayward (8)	Smoothie King Center; 15,321	19–33
53	February 11	@ Dallas	L 82–87	Trey Burke (16)	Enes Kanter (10)	Gordon Hayward (8)	American Airlines Center; 19,947	19–34
All-Star Break
54	February 20	Portland	W 92–76	Gordon Hayward (20)	Favors & Booker (9)	Hayward, Exum & Burke (3)	EnergySolutions Arena; 19,911	20–34
55	February 23	San Antonio	W 90–81	Trey Burke (23)	Rudy Gobert (14)	Hayward & Ingles (3)	EnergySolutions Arena; 18,782	21–34
56	February 25	L.A. Lakers	L 97–100	Gordon Hayward (20)	Rudy Gobert (14)	Trey Burke (4)	EnergySolutions Arena; 19,911	21–35
57	February 27	@ Denver	W 104–82	Derrick Favors (21)	Derrick Favors (10)	Hayward & Ingles (5)	Pepsi Center; 15,002	22–35
58	February 28	Milwaukee	W 82–75	Trey Burke (23)	Derrick Favors (12)	Trey Burke (6)	EnergySolutions Arena; 19,515	23–35

March : 10–6 (home: 5–3; road: 5–3)

Game	Date	Team	Score	High points	High rebounds	High assists	Location Attendance	Record
59	March 3	@ Memphis	W 93–82	Favors & Hayward (21)	Rudy Gobert (24)	Dante Exum (7)	FedExForum; 16,779	24–35
60	March 4	@ Boston	L 84–85	Favors & Burke (16)	Rudy Gobert (16)	Trey Burke (8)	TD Garden; 16,354	24–36
61	March 6	@ Philadelphia	W 89–83	Gordon Hayward (25)	Rudy Gobert (15)	Gordon Hayward (4)	Wells Fargo Center; 15,811	25–36
62	March 8	@ Brooklyn	W 95–88	Gordon Hayward (24)	Rudy Gobert (11)	Rudy Gobert (5)	Barclays Center; 17,041	26–36
63	March 10	New York	W 87–82	Derrick Favors (12)	Rudy Gobert (14)	Joe Ingles (5)	EnergySolutions Arena; 17,121	27–36
64	March 12	Houston	W 109–91	Gordon Hayward (29)	Rudy Gobert (22)	Gordon Hayward (7)	EnergySolutions Arena; 18,781	28–36
65	March 14	Detroit	W 88–85	Derrick Favors (26)	Rudy Gobert (19)	Dante Exum (5)	EnergySolutions Arena; 19,911	29–36
66	March 16	Charlotte	W 94–66	Rodney Hood (24)	Rudy Gobert (22)	Trey Burke (4)	EnergySolutions Arena; 16,743	30–36
67	March 18	Washington	L 84–88	Gordon Hayward (26)	Rudy Gobert (14)	Trey Burke (6)	EnergySolutions Arena; 19,498	30–37
68	March 19	@ L.A. Lakers	W 80–73	Gordon Hayward (22)	Favors & Gobert (7)	Gordon Hayward (5)	Staples Center; 17,407	31–37
69	March 21	@ Golden State	L 91–106	Derrick Favors (21)	Derrick Favors (11)	Gordon Hayward (7)	Oracle Arena; 19,596	31–38
70	March 23	Minnesota	L 104–106 (OT)	Derrick Favors (19)	Rudy Gobert (17)	Trey Burke (6)	EnergySolutions Arena; 19,911	31–39
71	March 25	Portland	L 89–92	Derrick Favors (26)	Derrick Favors (13)	Trey Burke (3)	EnergySolutions Arena; 19,911	31–40
72	March 27	@ Denver	L 91–107	Gordon Hayward (24)	Rudy Gobert (14)	Trevor Booker (5)	Pepsi Center; 15,312	31–41
73	March 28	Oklahoma City	W 94–89	Trey Burke (22)	Rudy Gobert (15)	Gordon Hayward (5)	EnergySolutions Arena; 19,911	32–41
74	March 30	@ Minnesota	W 104–84	Gordon Hayward (22)	Trevor Booker (13)	Gordon Hayward (5)	Target Center; 12,229	33–41

April : 5–3 (home: 3–1; road: 2–2)

Game	Date	Team	Score	High points	High rebounds	High assists	Location Attendance	Record
75	April 1	Denver	W 98–84	Rudy Gobert (20)	Rudy Gobert (12)	Dante Exum (12)	EnergySolutions Arena; 18,275	34–41
76	April 4	@ Phoenix	L 85–87	Gordon Hayward (21)	Rudy Gobert (15)	Gordon Hayward (4)	US Airways Center; 18,055	34–42
77	April 5	@ Sacramento	W 101–95	Rodney Hood (25)	Booker & Gobert (9)	Dante Exum (6)	Sleep Train Arena; 16,716	35–42
78	April 8	Sacramento	W 103–91	Rodney Hood (20)	Derrick Favors (11)	Joe Ingles (6)	EnergySolutions Arena; 18,351	36–42
79	April 10	Memphis	L 88–89	Gordon Hayward (27)	Rudy Gobert (14)	Dante Exum (5)	EnergySolutions Arena; 18,873	36–43
80	April 11	@ Portland	W 111–105	Trevor Booker (36)	Rudy Gobert (11)	Rodney Hood (8)	CenturyLink Arena; 19,908	37–43
81	April 13	Dallas	W 109–92	Bryce Cotton (24)	Rudy Gobert (17)	Cotton & Hood (4)	EnergySolutions Arena; 19,911	38–43
82	April 15	@ Houston	L 91–117	Bryce Cotton (14)	Rudy Gobert (8)	Elijah Millsap (7)	Toyota Center; 18,320	38–44

2014–15 season schedule

== Player statistics ==
Legend
GP	Games played	GS	Games started	MPG	Minutes per game
FG%	Field-goal percentage	3P%	3-point field-goal percentage	FT%	Free-throw percentage
RPG	Rebounds per game	APG	Assists per game	SPG	Steals per game
BPG	Blocks per game	PPG	Points per game

=== Regular season ===
Player	GP	GS	MPG	FG%	3P%	FT%	RPG	APG	SPG	BPG	PPG
Danté Exum	82	41	22.2	.349	.314	.625	1.6	2.4	.5	.2	4.8
Rudy Gobert	82	37	26.3	.604	.000	.623	9.5	1.3	.8	2.3	8.4
Joe Ingles	79	32	21.2	.415	.356	.750	2.2	2.3	.9	.1	5.0
Trevor Booker	79	5	19.8	.487	.345	.581	5.0	1.1	.5	.5	7.2
Gordon Hayward	76	76	34.4	.445	.364	.812	4.9	4.1	1.4	.4	19.3
Trey Burke	76	43	30.1	.368	.318	.752	2.7	4.3	.9	.2	12.8
Derrick Favors	74	74	30.8	.525	.167	.669	8.2	1.5	.8	1.7	16.0
Rodney Hood	50	21	21.3	.414	.365	.763	2.3	1.7	.6	.2	8.7
Enes Kanter Freedom^{†}	49	48	27.1	.491	.317	.788	7.8	.5	.5	.3	13.8
Elijah Millsap	47	5	19.7	.340	.311	.674	3.2	1.2	1.2	.3	5.3
Jeremy Evans	38	0	7.0	.552	.400	.828	1.9	.3	.3	.3	2.4
Alec Burks	27	27	33.3	.403	.382	.822	4.2	3.0	.6	.2	13.9
Ian Clark^{†}	23	0	7.0	.341	.360	1.000	.6	.4	.3	.1	1.9
Steve Novak^{†}	22	0	5.0	.457	.485	.000	.7	.3	.0	.0	2.2
Jack Cooley	16	0	5.4	.409		.429	1.6	.1	.4	.2	1.7
Bryce Cotton	15	0	10.6	.420	.350	.833	1.2	1.0	.3	.0	5.3
Chris Johnson^{†}	12	0	17.6	.484	.342	1.000	1.5	.6	1.0	.0	6.8
Elliot Williams^{†}	5	0	8.4	.462	.714	.500	.6	.8	.4	.0	3.6
Patrick Christopher	4	1	7.3	.250	.000		1.5	.0	.3	.0	1.5
Grant Jerrett^{†}	3	0	8.7	.444	.000	1.000	1.7	.7	.7	.0	3.0
Jerrelle Benimon	2	0	1.5				1.5	.0	.0	.0	.0
Toure' Murry^{†}	1	0	1.0	.000			.0	.0	.0	.0	.0

- ^{†} Denotes player spent time with another team in the season. Stats reflect time with the Jazz only.

== Injuries ==
Player	Duration	Injury type	Games missed
Start	End		

== Transactions ==
=== Trades ===
February 19, 2015	To Utah Jazz Kendrick Perkins (from Oklahoma City); Grant Jerrett (from Oklahoma City); Rights to Tibor Pleiß (from Oklahoma City); 2017 first-round pick (from Oklahoma City); 2017 second-round pick (from Detroit)	To Oklahoma City Thunder Enes Kanter from Utah); Steve Novak from Utah); D. J. Augustin (from Detroit); Kyle Singler (from Detroit); 2019 second-round pick (from Detroit)	To Detroit Pistons Reggie Jackson (from Oklahoma City)

=== Free agents ===
==== Re-signed ====
Player	Signed	Contract	Ref.

==== Additions ====
Player	Signed	Former team	Ref.

==== Subtractions ====
Player	Reason left	Date	New team	Ref.

== Awards ==
Player	Award	Date awarded	Ref.
