= 2017–18 Utah Jazz season =

NBA professional basketball team season

- Head coach: Quin Snyder
- General manager: Dennis Lindsey
- Arena: Vivint Arena

Results
- Record: 48–34 (.585)
- Place: Division: 3rd (Northwest); Conference: 5th (Western)
- Playoff finish: Conference Semifinals (lost to Rockets 1–4)
- Stats at Basketball Reference

Local media
- Television: AT&T SportsNet Rocky Mountain
- Radio: 1280; 97.5 The Zone

The 2017–18 Utah Jazz season was the 44th season of the franchise in the National Basketball Association (NBA), and the 39th season of the franchise in Salt Lake City. On the 4th of July, Gordon Hayward announced his departure from the Jazz and signed with the Boston Celtics. Despite that, the Jazz clinched a playoff berth for the second straight year after defeating the Los Angeles Lakers on April 8, 2018.

They finished the regular season with 48–34, which clinched the 5th seed. In the playoffs, the Jazz faced the 4th seeded Oklahoma City Thunder in the First Round, winning in six games and advancing to the Semifinals for the second consecutive season, where they faced the top-seeded Houston Rockets, losing in five games.

== Draft picks ==
Round	Pick	Player	Position	Nationality	College
1	24	Tyler Lydon	PF	United States	Syracuse
1	30	Josh Hart	SG	United States	Villanova
2	42	Thomas Bryant	PF/C	United States	Indiana
2	55	Nigel Williams-Goss	PG	United States	Gonzaga

The Jazz entered the draft with four draft picks. The 30th and 42nd picks previously acquired from different teams via trade were used to select Josh Hart and Thomas Bryant, respectively, and their rights were soon traded to the Los Angeles Lakers in exchange for the rights to the 28th pick Tony Bradley. The Jazz also traded the rights of the 24th pick Tyler Lydon alongside Trey Lyles to the Denver Nuggets for the rights to the 13th pick, Donovan Mitchell.

== Roster ==
2017–18 Utah Jazz roster
Players

Pos.	No.	Player	Height	Weight	DOB	From
C	13	Tony Bradley	6 ft 11 in (2.11 m)	248 lb (112 kg)	1998–01–08	North Carolina
G	10	Alec Burks	6 ft 6 in (1.98 m)	214 lb (97 kg)	1991–07–20	Colorado
F	99	Jae Crowder	6 ft 6 in (1.98 m)	235 lb (107 kg)	1990–07–06	Marquette
G	11	Dante Exum	6 ft 6 in (1.98 m)	190 lb (86 kg)	1995–07–13	Lake Ginninderra (AUS)
F/C	15	Derrick Favors	6 ft 10 in (2.08 m)	265 lb (120 kg)	1991–07–15	Georgia Tech
C	27	Rudy Gobert	7 ft 1 in (2.16 m)	245 lb (111 kg)	1992–06–26	France
F	2	Joe Ingles	6 ft 8 in (2.03 m)	226 lb (103 kg)	1987–10–02	Lake Ginninderra (AUS)
F	8	Jonas Jerebko	6 ft 10 in (2.08 m)	231 lb (105 kg)	1987–03–02	Sweden
F	21	Erik McCree (TW)	6 ft 8 in (2.03 m)	225 lb (102 kg)	1993–12–20	Louisiana Tech
G	45	Donovan Mitchell	6 ft 3 in (1.91 m)	215 lb (98 kg)	1996–09–07	Louisville
G	25	Raul Neto	6 ft 1 in (1.85 m)	179 lb (81 kg)	1992–05–19	Brazil
F	31	Georges Niang (TW)	6 ft 6 in (1.98 m)	231 lb (105 kg)	1993–06–17	Iowa State
F	23	Royce O'Neale	6 ft 6 in (1.98 m)	226 lb (103 kg)	1993–06–05	Baylor
G	3	Ricky Rubio	6 ft 4 in (1.93 m)	190 lb (86 kg)	1990–10–21	Spain
F	22	Thabo Sefolosha (S)	6 ft 7 in (2.01 m)	220 lb (100 kg)	1984–05–02	Switzerland
G	5	David Stockton	5 ft 11 in (1.80 m)	165 lb (75 kg)	1991–06–24	Gonzaga
F/C	33	Ekpe Udoh	6 ft 10 in (2.08 m)	245 lb (111 kg)	1987–05–20	Baylor

Coaches
Head coach
- Quin Snyder
Assistant(s)
- Johnnie Bryant
- Alex Jensen
- Zach Guthrie
- Igor Kokoškov
- Antonio Lang
- Mike Wells
- Mark McKown (player development)
- Jeff Watkinson (player development)

Legend
- (DP) Unsigned draft pick
- (FA) Free agent
- (S) Suspended
- (GL) On assignment to G League affiliate
- (TW) Two-way affiliate player
- Injured

Roster
Updated: 2018–05–08

== Uniforms ==
Association	Icon	Statement	City

== Standings ==
=== Division ===
Northwest Division	W	L	PCT	GB	Home	Road	Div	GP
y – Portland Trail Blazers	49	33	.598	–	28‍–‍13	21‍–‍20	9–7	82
x – Oklahoma City Thunder	48	34	.585	1.0	27‍–‍14	21‍–‍20	5–11	82
x – Utah Jazz	48	34	.585	1.0	28‍–‍13	20‍–‍21	7–9	82
x – Minnesota Timberwolves	47	35	.573	2.0	30‍–‍11	17‍–‍24	10–6	82
Denver Nuggets	46	36	.561	3.0	31‍–‍10	15‍–‍26	9–7	82

=== Conference ===
Western Conference
#	Team	W	L	PCT	GB	GP
1	z – Houston Rockets *	65	17	.793	–	82
2	y – Golden State Warriors *	58	24	.707	7.0	82
3	y – Portland Trail Blazers *	49	33	.598	16.0	82
4	x – Oklahoma City Thunder	48	34	.585	17.0	82
5	x – Utah Jazz	48	34	.585	17.0	82
6	x – New Orleans Pelicans	48	34	.585	17.0	82
7	x – San Antonio Spurs	47	35	.573	18.0	82
8	x – Minnesota Timberwolves	47	35	.573	18.0	82
9	Denver Nuggets	46	36	.561	19.0	82
10	Los Angeles Clippers	42	40	.512	23.0	82
11	Los Angeles Lakers	35	47	.427	30.0	82
12	Sacramento Kings	27	55	.329	38.0	82
13	Dallas Mavericks	24	58	.293	41.0	82
14	Memphis Grizzlies	22	60	.268	43.0	82
15	Phoenix Suns	21	61	.256	44.0	82

== Game log ==
=== Preseason ===
2017 pre-season game log
Total: 5–0 (home: 3–0; road: 2–0)
Pre-season: 5–0 (home: 3–0; road: 2–0)

Game	Date	Team	Score	High points	High rebounds	High assists	Location Attendance	Record
1	October 2	Sydney	W 108–84	Rodney Hood (18)	Rudy Gobert (10)	Joe Ingles (5)	Vivint Smart Home Arena; 15,692	1–0
2	October 4	Maccabi Haifa	W 117–78	Alec Burks (16)	Alec Burks (8)	Dante Exum (6)	Vivint Smart Home Arena; 14,126	2–0
3	October 6	Phoenix	W 112–101	Burks, Hood (19)	Rudy Gobert (12)	Gobert, Joe Johnson, Udoh (3)	Vivint Smart Home Arena; 17,196	3–0
4	October 9	@ Phoenix	W 120–102	Ricky Rubio (20)	Derrick Favors (6)	Alec Burks (5)	Talking Stick Resort Arena; 7,643	4–0
5	October 10	@ L.A. Lakers	W 105–99	Rudy Gobert (29)	Rudy Gobert (13)	Ricky Rubio (6)	Staples Center; 15,054	5–0

2017–18 season schedule

=== Regular season ===
2017–18 game log
Total: 48–34 (home: 28–13; road: 20–21)
October: 4–3 (home: 4–0; road: 0–3)

Game	Date	Team	Score	High points	High rebounds	High assists	Location Attendance	Record
1	October 18	Denver	W 106–96	Rudy Gobert (18)	Rudy Gobert (10)	Ricky Rubio (10)	Vivint Smart Home Arena; 17,588	1–0
2	October 20	@ Minnesota	L 97–100	Rodney Hood (20)	Rudy Gobert (18)	Ricky Rubio (10)	Target Center; 18,978	1–1
3	October 21	Oklahoma City	W 96–87	Joe Ingles (19)	Rudy Gobert (13)	Donovan Mitchell (6)	Vivint Smart Home Arena; 18,300	2–1
4	October 24	@ L.A. Clippers	L 84–102	Donovan Mitchell (19)	Thabo Sefolosha (12)	Ricky Rubio (5)	Staples Center; 16,607	2–2
5	October 25	@ Phoenix	L 88–97	Rodney Hood (22)	Rudy Gobert (14)	Ricky Rubio (11)	Talking Stick Resort Arena; 16,022	2–3
6	October 28	L.A. Lakers	W 96–81	Donovan Mitchell (22)	Derrick Favors (10)	Ingles, Johnson, Rubio (4)	Vivint Smart Home Arena; 18,306	3–3
7	October 30	Dallas	W 104–89	Rodney Hood (25)	Rudy Gobert (12)	Gobert, Ingles, Rubio (6)	Vivint Smart Home Arena; 16,221	4–3

November : 7–8 (home: 5–4; road: 2–4)

Game	Date	Team	Score	High points	High rebounds	High assists	Location Attendance	Record
8	November 1	Portland	W 112–103 (OT)	Ricky Rubio (30)	Rudy Gobert (10)	Joe Ingles (5)	Vivint Smart Home Arena; 16,685	5–3
9	November 3	Toronto	L 100–109	Donovan Mitchell (25)	Favors, Gobert (7)	Joe Ingles (6)	Vivint Smart Home Arena; 16,258	5–4
10	November 5	@ Houston	L 110–137	Donovan Mitchell (17)	Rudy Gobert (5)	Donovan Mitchell (4)	Toyota Center; 16,914	5–5
11	November 7	Philadelphia	L 97–102	Rodney Hood (19)	Rudy Gobert (15)	Ricky Rubio (8)	Vivint Smart Home Arena; 16,063	5–6
12	November 10	Miami	L 74–84	Rodney Hood (19)	Rudy Gobert (12)	Joe Ingles (5)	Vivint Smart Home Arena; 18,306	5–7
13	November 11	Brooklyn	W 114–106	Donovan Mitchell (26)	Derrick Favors (12)	Ricky Rubio (8)	Vivint Smart Home Arena; 17,413	6–7
14	November 13	Minnesota	L 98–109	Donovan Mitchell (24)	Derrick Favors (10)	Joe Ingles (5)	Vivint Smart Home Arena; 17,236	6–8
15	November 15	@ New York	L 101–106	Rodney Hood (30)	Derrick Favors (10)	Derrick Favors (5)	Madison Square Garden; 18,695	6–9
16	November 17	@ Brooklyn	L 107–118	Raul Neto (22)	Favors, Mitchell, O'Neale (7)	Donovan Mitchell (8)	Barclays Center; 14,495	6–10
17	November 18	@ Orlando	W 125–85	Derrick Favors (25)	Derrick Favors (11)	Raul Neto (7)	Amway Center; 19,157	7–10
18	November 20	@ Philadelphia	L 86–107	Donovan Mitchell (17)	Derrick Favors (7)	Donovan Mitchell (5)	Wells Fargo Center; 20,587	7–11
19	November 22	Chicago	W 110–80	Derrick Favors (23)	Derrick Favors (7)	Donovan Mitchell (7)	Vivint Smart Home Arena; 17,434	8–11
20	November 25	Milwaukee	W 121–108	Donovan Mitchell (24)	Derrick Favors (6)	Joe Ingles (9)	Vivint Smart Home Arena; 17,298	9–11
21	November 28	Denver	W 106–77	Derrick Favors (24)	Derrick Favors (9)	Joe Ingles (6)	Vivint Smart Home Arena; 16,790	10–11
22	November 30	@ L.A. Clippers	W 126–107	Alec Burks (28)	Derrick Favors (12)	Mitchell, Ingles, Rubio (6)	Staples Center; 15,139	11–11

December : 5–10 (home: 4–2; road: 1–8)

Game	Date	Team	Score	High points	High rebounds	High assists	Location Attendance	Record
23	December 1	New Orleans	W 114–108	Donovan Mitchell (41)	Derrick Favors (11)	Joe Ingles (7)	Vivint Smart Home Arena; 17,725	12–11
24	December 4	Washington	W 116–69	Alec Burks (27)	Rudy Gobert (10)	Royce O'Neale (6)	Vivint Smart Home Arena; 17,227	13–11
25	December 5	@ Oklahoma City	L 94–100	Donovan Mitchell (31)	Thabo Sefolosha (8)	Burks, Rubio (6)	Chesapeake Energy Arena; 18,203	13–12
26	December 7	Houston	L 101–112	Donovan Mitchell (26)	Rudy Gobert (9)	Mitchell, Ingles (4)	Vivint Smart Home Arena; 18,306	13–13
27	December 9	@ Milwaukee	L 100–117	Burks, Gobert (20)	Rudy Gobert (9)	Ricky Rubio (7)	Bradley Center; 16,675	13–14
28	December 13	@ Chicago	L 100–103	Donovan Mitchell (32)	Rudy Gobert (11)	Donovan Mitchell (6)	United Center; 18,102	13–15
29	December 15	@ Boston	W 107–95	Ricky Rubio (22)	Ekpe Udoh (9)	Donovan Mitchell (9)	TD Garden; 18,624	14–15
30	December 16	@ Cleveland	L 100–109	Donovan Mitchell (26)	Ekpe Udoh (7)	Joe Ingles (9)	Quicken Loans Arena; 20,562	14–16
31	December 18	@ Houston	L 99–120	Rodney Hood (26)	Jerebko, Udoh (5)	Hood, Ingles, Rubio (4)	Toyota Center; 18,055	14–17
32	December 20	@ Oklahoma City	L 79–107	Rodney Hood (17)	Jonas Jerebko (8)	Alec Burks (4)	Chesapeake Energy Arena; 18,203	14–18
33	December 21	San Antonio	W 100–89	Rodney Hood (29)	Ricky Rubio (11)	Ricky Rubio (7)	Vivint Smart Home Arena; 18,306	15–18
34	December 23	Oklahoma City	L 89–103	Donovan Mitchell (29)	Favors, Ingles (8)	Ingles, Rubio (5)	Vivint Smart Home Arena; 18,306	15–19
35	December 26	@ Denver	L 83–107	Derrick Favors (20)	Rubio, Ingles (7)	Ricky Rubio (7)	Pepsi Center; 17,104	15–20
36	December 27	@ Golden State	L 101–126	Rodney Hood (26)	Derrick Favors (10)	Joe Ingles (7)	Oracle Arena; 19,596	15–21
37	December 30	Cleveland	W 104–101	Donovan Mitchell (29)	Thabo Sefolosha (12)	Ricky Rubio (8)	Vivint Smart Home Arena; 18,306	16–21

January : 6–7 (home: 2–3; road: 4–4)

Game	Date	Team	Score	High points	High rebounds	High assists	Location Attendance	Record
38	January 3	New Orleans	L 98–108	Donovan Mitchell (24)	Derrick Favors (9)	Ricky Rubio (7)	Vivint Smart Home Arena; 18,306	16–22
39	January 5	@ Denver	L 91–99	Mitchell, Rubio (15)	Derrick Favors (10)	Joe Ingles (9)	Pepsi Center; 15,557	16–23
40	January 7	@ Miami	L 102–103	Donovan Mitchell (27)	Derrick Favors (10)	Ricky Rubio (6)	American Airlines Arena; 19,600	16–24
41	January 10	@ Washington	W 107–104	Ricky Rubio (21)	Ekpe Udoh (9)	Joe Ingles (6)	Capital One Arena; 15,640	17–24
42	January 12	@ Charlotte	L 88–99	Donovan Mitchell (35)	Royce O'Neale (10)	Joe Ingles (6)	Spectrum Center; 14,848	17–25
43	January 15	Indiana	L 94–109	Donovan Mitchell (23)	Derrick Favors (7)	Raul Neto (3)	Vivint Smart Home Arena; 18,306	17–26
44	January 17	@ Sacramento	W 120–105	Donovan Mitchell (34)	Derrick Favors (11)	Ricky Rubio (7)	Golden 1 Center; 17,583	18–26
45	January 19	NY Knicks	L 115–117	Rudy Gobert (23)	Rudy Gobert (14)	Donovan Mitchell (7)	Vivint Smart Home Arena; 18,306	18–27
46	January 20	L.A. Clippers	W 125–113	Donovan Mitchell (23)	Derrick Favors (12)	Donovan Mitchell (7)	Vivint Smart Home Arena; 18,306	19–27
47	January 22	@ Atlanta	L 90–104	Alec Burks (17)	Rudy Gobert (10)	Ricky Rubio (6)	Philips Arena; 11,096	19–28
48	January 24	@ Detroit	W 98–95 (OT)	Gobert, Mitchell (15)	Favors, Rubio (10)	Joe Ingles (7)	Little Caesars Arena; 15,682	20–28
49	January 26	@ Toronto	W 97–93	Donovan Mitchell (26)	Rudy Gobert (15)	Ricky Rubio (6)	Air Canada Centre; 19,800	21–28
50	January 30	Golden State	W 129–99	Ricky Rubio (23)	Derrick Favors (10)	Ricky Rubio (11)	Vivint Smart Home Arena; 18,306	22–28

February : 9–2 (home: 4–2; road: 5–0)

Game	Date	Team	Score	High points	High rebounds	High assists	Location Attendance	Record
51	February 2	@ Phoenix	W 129–97	Donovan Mitchell (40)	Derrick Favors (10)	Ricky Rubio (9)	Talking Stick Resort Arena; 16,560	23–28
52	February 3	@ San Antonio	W 120–111	Ricky Rubio (34)	Rudy Gobert (10)	Ricky Rubio (9)	AT&T Center; 18,418	24–28
53	February 5	@ New Orleans	W 133–109	Rodney Hood (30)	Rudy Gobert (10)	Ricky Rubio (11)	Smoothie King Center; 14,293	25–28
54	February 7	@ Memphis	W 92–88	Ricky Rubio (29)	Rudy Gobert (12)	Joe Ingles (4)	FedExForum; 13,187	26–28
55	February 9	Charlotte	W 106–94	Donovan Mitchell (25)	Rudy Gobert (11)	Ricky Rubio (7)	Vivint Smart Home Arena; 18,306	27–28
56	February 11	@ Portland	W 115–96	Donovan Mitchell (27)	Favors, Gobert, O'Neale (11)	Royce O'Neale (6)	Moda Center; 19,730	28–28
57	February 12	San Antonio	W 101–99	Donovan Mitchell (25)	Rudy Gobert (11)	Ingles, Mitchell (5)	Vivint Smart Home Arena; 18,306	29–28
58	February 14	Phoenix	W 107–97	Donovan Mitchell (24)	Rudy Gobert (17)	Donovan Mitchell (7)	Vivint Smart Home Arena; 18,306	30–28
All-Star Break
59	February 23	Portland	L 81–100	Donovan Mitchell (21)	Derrick Favors (9)	Royce O'Neale (4)	Vivint Smart Home Arena; 18,306	30–29
60	February 24	Dallas	W 97–90	Donovan Mitchell (25)	Rudy Gobert (10)	Joe Ingles (8)	Vivint Smart Home Arena; 18,306	31–29
61	February 26	Houston	L 85–96	Rudy Gobert (17)	Derrick Favors (7)	Rubio, Crowder (5)	Vivint Smart Home Arena; 18,306	31–30

March : 12–3 (home: 6–2; road: 6–1)

Game	Date	Team	Score	High points	High rebounds	High assists	Location Attendance	Record
62	March 2	Minnesota	W 116–108	Gobert, Mitchell (26)	Rudy Gobert (16)	Ricky Rubio (7)	Vivint Smart Home Arena; 18,306	32–30
63	March 3	@ Sacramento	W 98–91	Donovan Mitchell (27)	Rudy Gobert (12)	Ricky Rubio (6)	Golden 1 Center; 17,583	33–30
64	March 5	Orlando	W 94–80	Rudy Gobert (21)	Rudy Gobert (17)	Ricky Rubio (8)	Vivint Smart Home Arena; 18,306	34–30
65	March 7	@ Indiana	W 104–84	Rudy Gobert (23)	Rudy Gobert (14)	Joe Ingles (10)	Bankers Life Fieldhouse; 16,432	35–30
66	March 9	@ Memphis	W 95–78	Jae Crowder (22)	Gobert, Rubio (10)	Donovan Mitchell (6)	FedExForum; 15,622	36–30
67	March 11	@ New Orleans	W 116–99	Ricky Rubio (30)	Rudy Gobert (16)	Ricky Rubio (7)	Smoothie King Center; 18,062	37–30
68	March 13	Detroit	W 110–79	Rudy Gobert (22)	Rudy Gobert (12)	Ricky Rubio (9)	Vivint Smart Home Arena; 18,306	38–30
69	March 15	Phoenix	W 116–88	Donovan Mitchell (23)	Rudy Gobert (13)	Ricky Rubio (11)	Vivint Smart Home Arena; 18,306	39–30
70	March 17	Sacramento	W 103–97	Donovan Mitchell (28)	Rudy Gobert (13)	Ricky Rubio (5)	Vivint Smart Home Arena; 18,306	40–30
71	March 20	Atlanta	L 94–99	Donovan Mitchell (24)	Rudy Gobert (16)	Joe Ingles (7)	Vivint Smart Home Arena; 18,306	40–31
72	March 22	@ Dallas	W 119–112	Donovan Mitchell (26)	Favors, Gobert (7)	Joe Ingles (7)	American Airlines Center; 19,725	41–31
73	March 23	@ San Antonio	L 120–124 (OT)	Donovan Mitchell (35)	Favors, Gobert (8)	Ricky Rubio (9)	AT&T Center; 18,418	41–32
74	March 25	@ Golden State	W 110–91	Donovan Mitchell (21)	Rudy Gobert (15)	Donovan Mitchell (6)	Oracle Arena; 19,596	42–32
75	March 28	Boston	L 94–97	Donovan Mitchell (22)	Rudy Gobert (11)	Ricky Rubio (10)	Vivint Smart Home Arena; 18,306	42–33
76	March 30	Memphis	W 107–97	Donovan Mitchell (22)	Rudy Gobert (10)	Joe Ingles (10)	Vivint Smart Home Arena; 18,306	43–33

April : 5–1 (home: 3–0; road: 2–1)

Game	Date	Team	Score	High points	High rebounds	High assists	Location Attendance	Record
77	April 1	@ Minnesota	W 121–97	Ricky Rubio (23)	Rudy Gobert (13)	Dante Exum (5)	Target Center; 18,978	44–33
78	April 3	L.A. Lakers	W 117–110	Ricky Rubio (31)	Rudy Gobert (16)	Ricky Rubio (8)	Vivint Smart Home Arena; 18,306	45–33
79	April 5	L.A. Clippers	W 117–95	Donovan Mitchell (19)	Rudy Gobert (10)	Joe Ingles (9)	Vivint Smart Home Arena; 18,306	46–33
80	April 8	@ L.A. Lakers	W 112–97	Donovan Mitchell (28)	Derrick Favors (13)	Joe Ingles (10)	Staples Center; 18,997	47–33
81	April 10	Golden State	W 119–79	Donovan Mitchell (22)	Derrick Favors (9)	Joe Ingles (8)	Vivint Smart Home Arena; 18,306	48–33
82	April 11	@ Portland	L 93–102	Mitchell, Rubio (17)	Rudy Gobert (13)	Mitchell, Rubio (5)	Moda Center; 20,186	48–34

2017–18 season schedule

=== Playoffs ===
2018 playoff game log
Total: 5–6 (home: 3–2; road: 2–4)
First Round: 4–2 (home: 3–0; road: 1–2)

Game	Date	Team	Score	High points	High rebounds	High assists	Location Attendance	Series
1	April 15	@ Oklahoma City	L 108–116	Donovan Mitchell (27)	Donovan Mitchell (10)	Ricky Rubio (5)	Chesapeake Energy Arena; 18,203	0–1
2	April 18	@ Oklahoma City	W 102–95	Donovan Mitchell (28)	Derrick Favors (16)	Ricky Rubio (9)	Chesapeake Energy Arena; 18,203	1–1
3	April 21	Oklahoma City	W 115–102	Ricky Rubio (26)	Rudy Gobert (12)	Ricky Rubio (10)	Vivint Smart Home Arena; 18,306	2–1
4	April 23	Oklahoma City	W 113–96	Donovan Mitchell (33)	Rudy Gobert (10)	Ricky Rubio (8)	Vivint Smart Home Arena; 18,306	3–1
5	April 25	@ Oklahoma City	L 99–107	Jae Crowder (27)	Ricky Rubio (12)	Ricky Rubio (7)	Chesapeake Energy Arena; 18,203	3–2
6	April 27	Oklahoma City	W 96–91	Donovan Mitchell (38)	Rudy Gobert (13)	Joe Ingles (5)	Vivint Smart Home Arena; 18,306	4–2

Conference Semifinals: 1–4 (home: 0–2; road: 1–2)

Game	Date	Team	Score	High points	High rebounds	High assists	Location Attendance	Series
1	April 29	@ Houston	L 96–110	Crowder, Mitchell (21)	Rudy Gobert (9)	Ingles, Mitchell (5)	Toyota Center; 18,055	0–1
2	May 2	@ Houston	W 116–108	Joe Ingles (27)	Rudy Gobert (14)	Donovan Mitchell (11)	Toyota Center; 18,055	1–1
3	May 4	Houston	L 92–113	Royce O'Neale (17)	Rudy Gobert (9)	Raul Neto (4)	Vivint Smart Home Arena; 18,306	1–2
4	May 6	Houston	L 87–100	Donovan Mitchell (25)	Rudy Gobert (10)	Joe Ingles (4)	Vivint Smart Home Arena; 18,306	1–3
5	May 8	@ Houston	L 102–112	Donovan Mitchell (24)	Rudy Gobert (9)	Donovan Mitchell (9)	Toyota Center; 18,055	1–4

2018 playoff schedule

== Player statistics ==
Legend
GP	Games played	GS	Games started	MPG	Minutes per game
FG%	Field-goal percentage	3P%	3-point field-goal percentage	FT%	Free-throw percentage
RPG	Rebounds per game	APG	Assists per game	SPG	Steals per game
BPG	Blocks per game	PPG	Points per game

=== Regular season ===
Player	GP	GS	MPG	FG%	3P%	FT%	RPG	APG	SPG	BPG	PPG
Joe Ingles	82	81	31.4	.467	.440	.795	4.2	4.8	1.1	.2	11.5
Donovan Mitchell	79	71	33.4	.437	.340	.805	3.7	3.7	1.5	.3	20.5
Ricky Rubio	77	77	29.3	.418	.352	.866	4.6	5.3	1.6	.1	13.1
Derrick Favors	77	77	28.0	.563	.222	.651	7.2	1.3	.7	1.1	12.3
Jonas Jerebko	74	19	15.3	.466	.414	.807	3.3	.6	.3	.2	5.8
Royce O'Neale	69	4	16.7	.423	.356	.803	3.4	1.4	.5	.2	5.0
Alec Burks	64	1	16.5	.411	.331	.863	3.0	1.0	.6	.1	7.7
Ekpe Udoh	63	3	12.9	.500	.000	.750	2.4	.8	.7	1.2	2.6
Rudy Gobert	56	56	32.4	.622		.682	10.7	1.4	.8	2.3	13.5
Raul Neto	41	0	12.1	.457	.404	.743	1.2	1.8	.3	.1	4.5
Rodney Hood^{†}	39	12	27.8	.424	.389	.876	2.8	1.7	.8	.2	16.8
Thabo Sefolosha	38	6	21.2	.492	.381	.815	4.2	.9	1.4	.3	8.2
Joe Johnson^{†}	32	3	21.9	.420	.274	.833	3.3	1.4	.4	.2	7.3
Jae Crowder^{†}	27	0	27.6	.386	.316	.768	3.8	1.5	.9	.3	11.8
Danté Exum	14	0	16.8	.483	.278	.806	1.9	3.1	.6	.2	8.1
Georges Niang	9	0	3.6	.364	.000	.500	1.0	.3	.2	.0	1.0
Tony Bradley	9	0	3.2	.273	.000	1.000	1.2	.1	.0	.0	.9
Nate Wolters	5	0	3.8	.167			.4	.2	.0	.0	.4
Erik McCree	4	0	2.0	.000	.000		.3	.0	.3	.0	.0
David Stockton	3	0	3.0	.667	.667	1.000	.0	.0	.0	.0	3.3
Naz Mitrou-Long	1	0	1.0	1.000	1.000		.0	.0	.0	.0	3.0

=== Playoffs ===
Player	GP	GS	MPG	FG%	3P%	FT%	RPG	APG	SPG	BPG	PPG
Donovan Mitchell	11	11	37.4	.420	.313	.907	5.9	4.2	1.5	.4	24.4
Rudy Gobert	11	11	34.8	.655		.603	10.7	1.0	.9	2.3	13.2
Joe Ingles	11	11	34.7	.471	.455	.647	4.4	3.4	.5	.2	14.5
Derrick Favors	11	9	26.0	.618	.400	.485	5.2	1.2	.7	1.0	9.3
Royce O'Neale	11	5	23.5	.500	.357	.632	3.5	1.4	.9	.4	7.1
Jae Crowder	11	2	29.4	.324	.333	.643	5.1	1.7	1.4	.2	10.0
Danté Exum	10	0	11.4	.488	.286	.750	1.4	1.0	.1	.1	5.1
Jonas Jerebko	10	0	7.9	.421	.167	1.000	1.6	.3	.3	.0	1.9
Alec Burks	9	0	13.3	.469	.450	.867	2.7	1.9	.4	.1	9.1
Raul Neto	8	0	9.0	.304	.286	1.000	1.3	1.3	.3	.0	2.6
Ricky Rubio	6	6	30.2	.354	.313	.783	7.3	7.0	1.3	.5	14.0
Ekpe Udoh	6	0	3.5	1.000		.000	.5	.0	.0	.3	.3
David Stockton	2	0	3.0	.333	.000		.5	.0	.0	.0	1.0
Tony Bradley	1	0	2.0	.500			1.0	.0	.0	.0	2.0

- ^{†} Denotes player spent time with another team in the season. Stats reflect time with the Jazz only.

== Transactions ==
=== Trades ===
June 22, 2017	to Utah Jazz Draft rights to Donovan Mitchell (pick 13)	To Denver Nuggets Trey Lyles; Draft rights to Tyler Lydon (pick 24)
June 22, 2017	To Utah Jazz Draft rights to Tony Bradley (pick 28)	To Los Angeles Lakers Draft rights to Josh Hart (pick 30); Draft rights to Thomas Bryant (pick 42)
June 30, 2017	To Utah Jazz Ricky Rubio	To Minnesota Timberwolves 2018 1st-round pick
February 8, 2018
February 8, 2018	To Cleveland Cavaliers Rodney Hood (from Utah); George Hill (from Sacramento); Draft rights to Artūras Gudaitis (from Sacramento)	To Sacramento Kings Joe Johnson (from Utah); Iman Shumpert (from Cleveland); 2020 second-round pick (from Miami via Cleveland); Draft rights to Dimitrios Agravanis (from Cleveland); Cash considerations (from Cleveland and Utah)
February 8, 2018	To Utah Jazz Jae Crowder (from Cleveland); Derrick Rose (from Cleveland); Right to swap 2024 second round picks with Cleveland

=== Free agency ===
==== Additions from non-NBA players ====
Player	Signed
Joe Ingles	July 25, 2017

==== Additions ====
Player	Signed	Former team
Jonas Jerebko	2-year contract worth $8.2 million	Boston Celtics
Thabo Sefolosha	2-year contract worth $10.5 million	Atlanta Hawks
Royce O'Neale	3-year contract worth $3,812,377	(Spain) Herbalife Gran Canaria
Eric Griffin	Two-way contract	(Israel) Hapoel Gilboa Galil
Ekpe Udoh	2-year contract worth $6.5 million	(Turkey) Fenerbahçe Istanbul
Nate Wolters	Two-way contract	(Serbia) Red Star Belgrade
Erik McCree	Two-way contract	Sioux Falls Skyforce
Naz Mitrou-Long	Two-way contract / 10-day contract	Iowa State Cyclones / Salt Lake City Stars
Georges Niang	Two-way contract	Santa Cruz Warriors

==== Subtractions ====
Player	Reason left	New team
Shelvin Mack	2-year contract worth $12 million	Orlando Magic
George Hill	3-year contract worth $57 million	Sacramento Kings
Gordon Hayward	4-year contract worth $128 million	Boston Celtics
Joel Bolomboy	Training camp cut	Milwaukee Bucks / Wisconsin Herd
Eric Griffin	Waived	(Israel) Hapoel Fattal Eilat
Nate Wolters	Waived	(France) Élan Chalon
Naz Mitrou-Long	Waived	Salt Lake City Stars
Derrick Rose	Waived	Minnesota Timberwolves

On July 7, 2018, Jonas Jerebko was waived by the Jazz, and picked up by the Golden State Warriors.
