= Jeremy Evans =

American basketball player (born 1987)

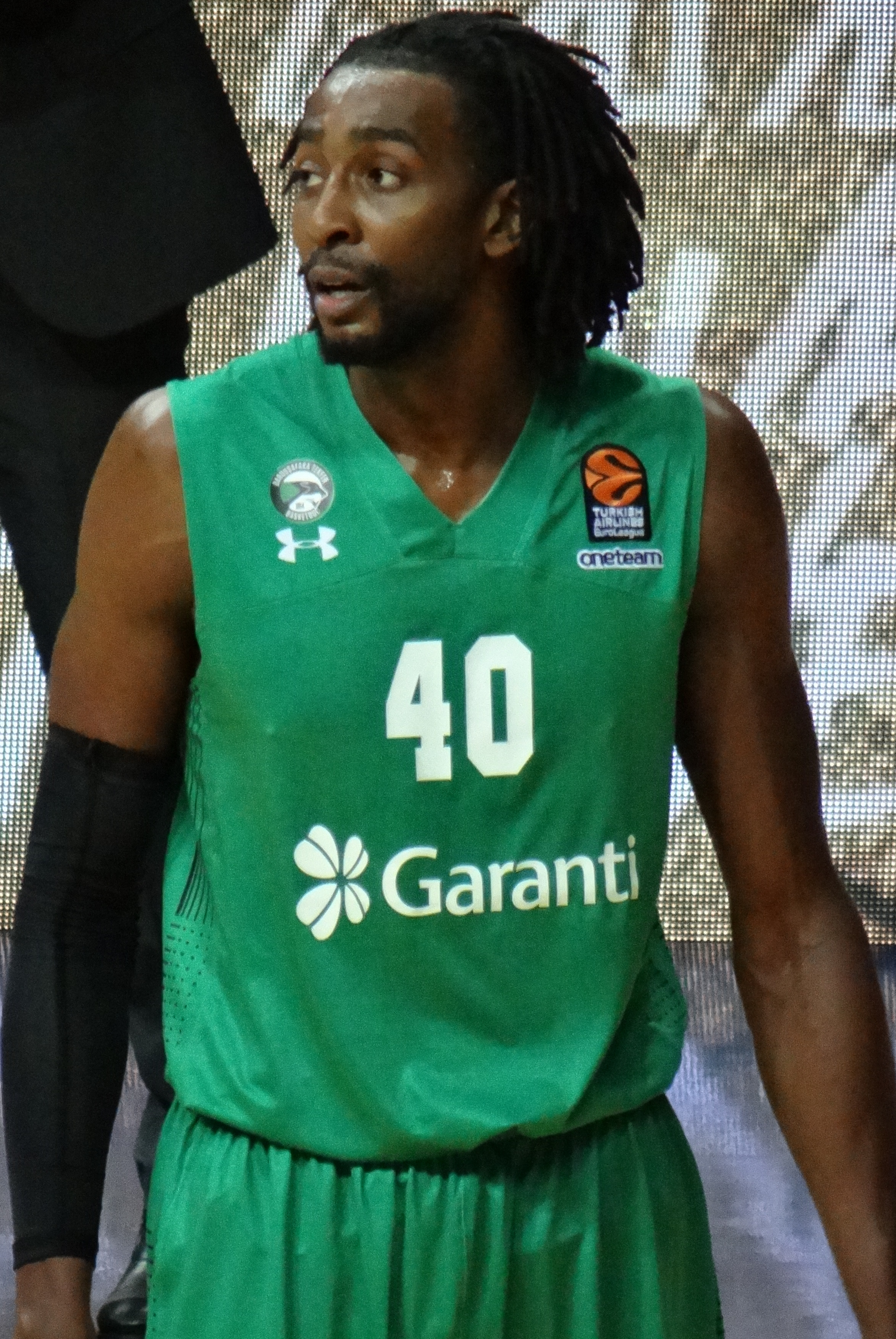
- Evans with Darüşşafaka in 2018.

Personal information
- Born: October 24, 1987 (age 39) Monroe, Louisiana, U.S.
- Listed height: 2.06 m (6 ft 9 in)
- Listed weight: 93 kg (205 lb)

Career information
- High school: Crossett (Crossett, Arkansas)
- College: Western Kentucky (2006–2010)
- NBA draft: 2010: 2nd round, 55th overall pick
- Drafted by: Utah Jazz
- Playing career: 2010–2025
- Position: Power forward / center
- Number: 40, 21, 22

Career history
- 2010–2015: Utah Jazz
- 2011: → Utah Flash
- 2015–2016: Dallas Mavericks
- 2015–2016: →Texas Legends
- 2016–2017: Khimki Moscow
- 2017–2018: Erie BayHawks
- 2018: Atlanta Hawks
- 2018: →Erie BayHawks
- 2018–2019: Darüşşafaka
- 2019–2020: Khimki Moscow
- 2021: Olimpia Milano
- 2021–2022: Panathinaikos
- 2022–2023: Paris Basketball
- 2023: Manama Club
- 2024: Nagasaki Velca
- 2025: Mykonos

Career highlights
- WASL champion (2023); BSL blocks leader (2019); NBA Slam Dunk Contest champion (2012); Greek Super Cup winner (2021)
- Stats at NBA.com
- Stats at Basketball Reference

Jeremy Deshawn Evans (born October 24, 1987) is an American former professional basketball player. He played college basketball for the Western Kentucky Hilltoppers before being drafted by the Utah Jazz in 2010. During his career, Evans has spent time with the Jazz, the Dallas Mavericks, Atlanta Hawks, and Khimki Moscow in Russia. In 2012, he was named the NBA Slam Dunk Contest champion.

== High school career ==
Evans attended Crossett High School, where he helped the Eagles reach the state tournament each of his last two seasons. As a junior, he was named All-State, All-League, and was voted the County Player of the Year after Crossett High finished 17–10. As a senior, he averaged 25.6 points, 11.0 rebounds, and 4.0 blocks per game, earning All-State and All-Conference accolades.

== College career ==
Evans played in college for the Western Kentucky Hilltoppers. As a senior, he averaged 10.0 ppg with a field goal percentage of .639. He is the Hilltoppers all-time leader in blocks with 224 and also a member of WKU's 1,000-point club with 1,065 career points, and he wrapped up his career with a 7.9 point-per game scoring average and an average of 5.9 rebounds per game.

== Professional career ==
=== Utah Jazz (2010–2015) ===
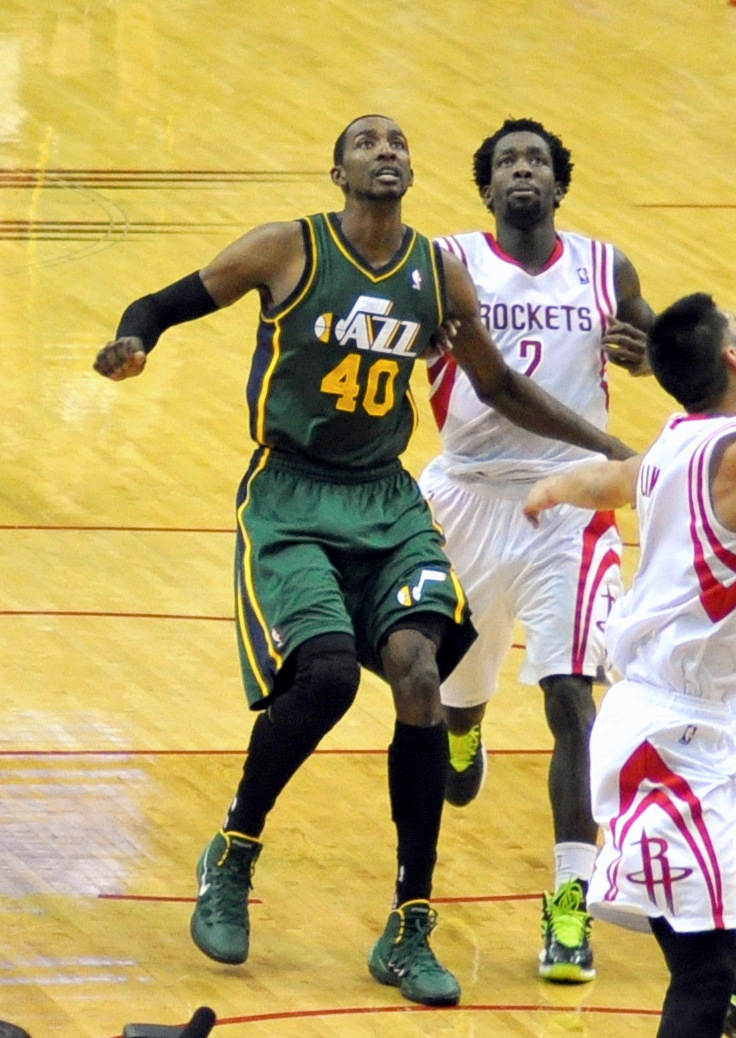
Evans with the Jazz in 2014

Evans was drafted by the Utah Jazz with the 55th overall pick in the 2010 NBA draft. On March 4, 2011, he was assigned to the Utah Flash. He was recalled on March 6.

On February 22, 2012, Evans was announced as a competitor in the 2012 Sprite NBA All-Star Weekend Slam Dunk Contest, replacing the injured Iman Shumpert of the New York Knicks. He dunked two basketballs in one dunk over teammate Gordon Hayward and won the contest with 29% of the votes.

On July 11, 2012, Evans re-signed with the Utah Jazz to a multi-year deal.

On February 16, 2013, Evans participated in another Slam Dunk Contest. In one of his dunks, he jumped over a painting of himself dunking, which he himself painted. He went on to lose to Terrence Ross.

=== Dallas Mavericks (2015–2016) ===
On July 31, 2015, Evans signed a two-year deal with the Dallas Mavericks. He made his debut for the Mavericks in the team's season opener against the Phoenix Suns on October 28, recording 7 points and 6 rebounds in a 111–95 win. During his first year as a member of Mavericks, he had multiple assignments to the Texas Legends of the NBA Development League. On March 17, 2016, he was ruled out for the rest of the season after undergoing arthroscopic surgery to repair a torn labrum in his right shoulder.

On July 7, 2016, Evans was traded, along with cash considerations and the rights to Emir Preldžić, to the Indiana Pacers in exchange for the rights to Stanko Barać. On October 23, 2016, he was waived by the Pacers after appearing in two preseason games.

=== Khimki (2016–2017) ===
On October 29, 2016, Evans signed with Russian club BC Khimki for the rest of the 2016–17 season.

=== Erie BayHawks (2017–2018) ===
On September 21, 2017, Evans signed with the Atlanta Hawks. He was released on October 13 as one of the team's final preseason roster cuts.

=== Atlanta Hawks (2018) ===
On April 1, 2018, the Atlanta Hawks announced that they had signed Evans to a 10-day contract.

=== Darüşşafaka (2018–2019) ===
On August 21, 2018, Evans signed a one-year deal with Darüşşafaka of the Turkish BSL and the EuroLeague.

=== Second stint with Khimki (2019–2020) ===
On July 25, 2019, Khimki announced that they had brought back Evans.

=== Olimpia Milano (2021) ===
On February 24, 2021, Evans signed with Olimpia Milano, competing only in EuroLeague games. He parted ways with the team on May 31.

=== Panathinaikos (2021–2022) ===
On August 21, 2021, Evans signed with Panathinaikos of the Greek Basket League and the EuroLeague, penning a one-year deal. In 28 Greek Basket League games, he averaged 6.8 points, 4.3 rebounds and 0.7 blocks, playing around 17 minutes per contest. Additionally, in 32 EuroLeague games, he averaged 5.5 points, 3 rebounds and 0.5 blocks, playing around 16 minutes per contest.

=== Paris Basketball (2022–2023) ===
On October 18, 2022, Evans signed with French club Paris Basketball of the LNB Pro A.

=== Manama (2023) ===
Evans played for Bahraini club Manama Club in 2023, and won the inaugural West Asia Super League (WASL) with the team. He averaged 8.3 points per game in the WASL season.

== The Basketball Tournament ==
In 2017, Evans played for the Kentucky Kings of The Basketball Tournament. Evans averaged 21.5 PPG and 13.0 RPG to help his team advance to the second round of the tournament. The Basketball Tournament is an annual $2 million winner-take-all tournament broadcast on ESPN. In TBT 2018, he played for Eberlein Drive. Eberlein Drive made it to the championship game, where they lost to Overseas Elite. Jeremy also saw stints in TBT in 2021 with Eberlein Drive.

== Career statistics ==
Legend
GP	Games played	GS	Games started	MPG	Minutes per game
FG%	Field-goal percentage	3P%	3-point field-goal percentage	FT%	Free-throw percentage
RPG	Rebounds per game	APG	Assists per game	SPG	Steals per game
BPG	Blocks per game	PPG	Points per game	PIR	Performance index rating
**Bold**	Career high

=== NBA ===
==== Regular season ====
Year	Team	GP	GS	MPG	FG%	3P%	FT%	RPG	APG	SPG	BPG	PPG
2010–11	Utah	49	3	9.4	**.661**	.000	.703	2.0	.5	.3	.3	3.6
2011–12	Utah	29	0	7.5	.643	.000	.500	1.7	.4	.2	**.8**	2.1
2012–13	Utah	37	0	5.8	.614	.000	.636	1.6	.3	.2	.4	2.0
2013–14	Utah	**66**	**4**	**18.3**	.527	.000	.680	**4.7**	**.7**	**.6**	.7	**6.1**
2014–15	Utah	38	0	7.0	.552	**.400**	**.828**	1.9	.3	.3	.3	2.4
2015–16	Dallas	30	2	8.4	.542	.250	.714	1.8	.1	.2	.3	2.4
2017–18	Atlanta	1	0	5.0	**1.000**	–	–	1.0	.0	.0	.0	2.0
Career		250	9	10.5	.569	.231	.687	2.6	.4	.4	.5	3.5

==== Playoffs ====
Year	Team	GP	GS	MPG	FG%	3P%	FT%	RPG	APG	SPG	BPG	PPG
2012	Utah	2	0	3.5	.000	–	1.000	1.5	.5	.5	.0	1.0
Career		2	0	3.5	.000	–	1.000	1.5	.5	.5	.0	1.0

=== EuroLeague ===
Year	Team	GP	GS	MPG	FG%	3P%	FT%	RPG	APG	SPG	BPG	PPG	PIR
2018–19	Darüşşafaka	27	25	26.0	.567	.379	.690	5.9	.8	.7	1.2	9.7	13.8
2019–20	Khimki	21	1	20.2	.593	.438	.743	4.4	.8	.6	.6	8.5	11
2020–21	Olimpia Milano	11	1	10.3	.591	.250	.500	3.1	.0	.3	.2	2.8	3.7
2021–22	Panathinaikos	32	13	16.2	.603	.500	.758	3.0	.4	.4	.5	5.5	7
Career		91	40	19.2	.585	.408	.712	4.2	.5	.5	.7	7.1	9.6

== Personal life ==
The son of Gwyn, he has one younger brother, Justin, and is married to Korrie. An accomplished artist, Evans had a sketch of CBS analyst Dan Bonner showcased on national television broadcast of the Hilltoppers’ second round battle with Gonzaga during the 2009 NCAA Tournament and some of his art was also displayed throughout the WKU athletic offices. He majored in interdisciplinary studies with a concentration in art.
