= 2013–14 Utah Jazz season =

NBA professional basketball team season

- Head coach: Tyrone Corbin
- Arena: EnergySolutions Arena

Results
- Record: 25–57 (.305)
- Place: Division: 5th (Northwest); Conference: 15th (Western)
- Playoff finish: Did not qualify
- Stats at Basketball Reference

Local media
- Television: Root Sports Rocky Mountain
- Radio: KFNZ, KBEE

The 2013–14 Utah Jazz season was the franchise's fortieth season in the National Basketball Association (NBA), and 35th season in Salt Lake City. The season ended with the Jazz finishing last in their respective division and conference, winning only twenty-five games for their worst record since the 24–58 1979–80 Jazz, who were playing the franchise's first season in Utah. The season also concluded with the release of coach Tyrone Corbin.

== Pre-season ==
2013 pre-season game log
Total: 1–7 (Home: 1–2; Road: 0–5)
Pre-season: 1–7 (home: 1–2; road: 0–5)

Game	Date	Team	Score	High points	High rebounds	High assists	Location Attendance	Record
1	October 8	Golden State	W 101–78	John Lucas III (16)	Derrick Favors (14)	Gordon Hayward (8)	EnergySolutions Arena; 19,025	1–0
2	October 11	@ Portland	L 86–96	Gordon Hayward (20)	Derrick Favors (9)	Trey Burke (5)	CenturyLink Arena; 6,268	1–1
3	October 12	L.A. Clippers	L 74–106	Richard Jefferson (13)	Richard Jefferson (8)	Gordon Hayward (5)	EnergySolutions Arena; 17,924	1–2
4	October 16	Portland	L 92–99	Enes Kanter (23)	Derrick Favors (17)	Gordon Hayward (7)	EnergySolutions Arena; 19,127	1–3
5	October 20	@ Oklahoma City	L 82–88	Gordon Hayward (18)	Derrick Favors (8)	John Lucas III (5)	Chesapeake Energy Arena; 18,203	1–4
6	October 22	@ L.A. Lakers	L 94–108	Brian Cook (18)	Derrick Favors (13)	Alec Burks (6)	Staples Center; 17,186	1–5
7	October 23	@ L.A. Clippers	L 99–103	Derrick Favors (24)	Derrick Favors (17)	Gordon Hayward (6)	Staples Center; 13,611	1–6
8	October 25	@ L.A. Lakers	L 106–111	Hayward & Burks (18)	Rudy Gobert (9)	Lester Hudson (6)	Honda Center; 14,808	1–7

2013–14 season schedule

== Roster ==
2013–14 Utah Jazz roster
Players

Pos.	No.	Player	Height	Weight	DOB	From
G	3	Trey Burke	6 ft 1 in (1.85 m)	190 lb (86 kg)	1992–11–12	Michigan
G	10	Alec Burks	6 ft 6 in (1.98 m)	211 lb (96 kg)	1991–07–20	Colorado
G	21	Ian Clark	6 ft 3 in (1.91 m)	173 lb (78 kg)	1991–03–07	Belmont
F	40	Jeremy Evans	6 ft 9 in (2.06 m)	194 lb (88 kg)	1987–10–24	Western Kentucky
F/C	15	Derrick Favors	6 ft 10 in (2.08 m)	268 lb (122 kg)	1991–07–15	Georgia Tech
G	8	Diante Garrett	6 ft 4 in (1.93 m)	190 lb (86 kg)	1988–11–03	Iowa State
C	27	Rudy Gobert	7 ft 1 in (2.16 m)	245 lb (111 kg)	1992–06–26	France
G/F	20	Gordon Hayward	6 ft 8 in (2.03 m)	220 lb (100 kg)	1990–03–23	Butler
F	24	Richard Jefferson	6 ft 7 in (2.01 m)	234 lb (106 kg)	1980–06–21	Arizona
C	0	Enes Kanter	6 ft 11 in (2.11 m)	247 lb (112 kg)	1992–05–20	Turkey
G	5	John Lucas III	5 ft 11 in (1.80 m)	166 lb (75 kg)	1982–11–21	Oklahoma State
F	33	Erik Murphy	6 ft 10 in (2.08 m)	230 lb (104 kg)	1990–10–26	Florida
G/F	25	Brandon Rush	6 ft 6 in (1.98 m)	233 lb (106 kg)	1985–07–07	Kansas
F	22	Malcolm Thomas	6 ft 9 in (2.06 m)	225 lb (102 kg)	1988–11–08	San Diego State
F	2	Marvin Williams	6 ft 9 in (2.06 m)	237 lb (108 kg)	1986–06–19	North Carolina

Coaches
Head coach
- Tyrone Corbin
Assistant(s)
- Sidney Lowe
- Mike Sanders
- Gary Briggs
- Brian Zettler

Legend
- (DP) Unsigned draft pick
- (FA) Free agent
- (S) Suspended
- (DL) On assignment to D-League affiliate
- Injured

Roster
Updated: 2014–04–05

== Player statistics ==
Legend
GP	Games played	GS	Games started	MPG	Minutes per game
FG%	Field-goal percentage	3P%	3-point field-goal percentage	FT%	Free-throw percentage
RPG	Rebounds per game	APG	Assists per game	SPG	Steals per game
BPG	Blocks per game	PPG	Points per game

=== Regular season ===
Player	GP	GS	MPG	FG%	3P%	FT%	RPG	APG	SPG	BPG	PPG
Richard Jefferson	82	78	27.0	.450	.409	.741	2.7	1.6	.7	.2	10.1
Enes Kanter Freedom	80	37	26.7	.491	.000	.730	7.5	.9	.4	.5	12.3
Alec Burks	78	12	28.1	.457	.350	.748	3.3	2.7	.9	.2	14.0
Gordon Hayward	77	77	36.4	.413	.304	.816	5.1	5.2	1.4	.5	16.2
Derrick Favors	73	73	30.2	.522	.000	.669	8.7	1.2	1.0	1.5	13.3
Diante Garrett	71	0	14.8	.381	.375	.833	1.4	1.7	.6	.1	3.5
Trey Burke	70	68	32.3	.380	.330	.903	3.0	5.7	.6	.1	12.8
Marvin Williams	66	50	25.4	.439	.359	.781	5.1	1.2	.8	.5	9.1
Jeremy Evans	66	4	18.3	.527	.000	.680	4.7	.7	.6	.7	6.1
Rudy Gobert	45	0	9.6	.486		.492	3.4	.2	.2	.9	2.3
John Lucas III	42	6	14.1	.326	.298	.625	.9	1.0	.3	.0	3.8
Brandon Rush	38	0	11.0	.333	.340	.600	1.2	.6	.1	.2	2.1
Ian Clark	23	0	7.5	.388	.355	.714	.8	.7	.3	.1	3.0
Mike Harris	20	0	11.3	.475	.000	.963	1.7	.3	.8	.4	4.2
Jamaal Tinsley	8	5	13.8	.200	.067		1.4	2.9	.3	.0	1.1
Malcolm Thomas^{†}	7	0	6.9	.500	.250		1.7	.3	.0	.1	1.9
Andris Biedriņš	6	0	7.5	1.000		.167	2.8	.0	.0	.0	.5

- ^{†} Denotes player spent time with another team in the season. Stats reflect time with the Jazz only.

== Regular season ==
=== Standings ===
Northwest Division	W	L	PCT	GB	Home	Road	Div	GP
y-Oklahoma City Thunder	59	23	.720	–	34‍–‍7	25‍–‍16	11–5	82
x-Portland Trail Blazers	54	28	.659	5.0	31‍–‍10	23‍–‍18	13–3	82
Minnesota Timberwolves	40	42	.488	19.0	24‍–‍17	16‍–‍25	7–9	82
Denver Nuggets	36	46	.439	23.0	22‍–‍19	14‍–‍27	5–11	82
Utah Jazz	25	57	.305	34.0	16‍–‍25	9‍–‍32	4–12	82

Western Conference
#	Team	W	L	PCT	GB	GP
1	z-San Antonio Spurs *	62	20	.756	–	82
2	y-Oklahoma City Thunder *	59	23	.720	3.0	82
3	y-Los Angeles Clippers *	57	25	.695	5.0	82
4	x-Houston Rockets	54	28	.659	8.0	82
5	x-Portland Trail Blazers	54	28	.659	8.0	82
6	x-Golden State Warriors	51	31	.622	11.0	82
7	x-Memphis Grizzlies	50	32	.610	12.0	82
8	x-Dallas Mavericks	49	33	.598	13.0	82
9	Phoenix Suns	48	34	.585	14.0	82
10	Minnesota Timberwolves	40	42	.488	22.0	82
11	Denver Nuggets	36	46	.439	26.0	82
12	New Orleans Pelicans	34	48	.415	28.0	82
13	Sacramento Kings	28	54	.341	34.0	82
14	Los Angeles Lakers	27	55	.329	35.0	82
15	Utah Jazz	25	57	.305	37.0	82

=== Game log ===
2013–14 game log
Total: 25–57 (Home: 16–25; Road: 9–32)
October: 0–1 (home: 0–1; road: 0–0)

Game	Date	Team	Score	High points	High rebounds	High assists	Location Attendance	Record
1	October 30	Oklahoma City	L 98–101	Alec Burks (24)	Enes Kanter (10)	Alec Burks (6)	EnergySolutions Arena; 19,911	0–1

November : 3–14 (home: 2–5; road: 1–9)

Game	Date	Team	Score	High points	High rebounds	High assists	Location Attendance	Record
2	November 1	@ Phoenix	L 84–87	Enes Kanter (20)	Derrick Favors (17)	Gordon Hayward (8)	US Airways Center; 14,662	0–2
3	November 2	Houston	L 93–104	Richard Jefferson (18)	Enes Kanter (8)	John Lucas III (4)	EnergySolutions Arena; 19,498	0–3
4	November 5	@ Brooklyn	L 88–104	Gordon Hayward (22)	Rudy Gobert (11)	Hayward & Burks (4)	Barclays Center; 17,732	0–4
5	November 6	@ Boston	L 87–97	Gordon Hayward (28)	Derrick Favors (14)	Gordon Hayward (5)	TD Garden; 17,130	0–5
6	November 8	@ Chicago	L 73–97	Gordon Hayward (15)	Rudy Gobert (12)	Gordon Hayward (5)	United Center; 21,946	0–6
7	November 9	@ Toronto	L 91–115	Gordon Hayward (24)	Favors, Hayward, Gobert (7)	Hayward, Tinsley, Burks (4)	Air Canada Centre; 17,211	0–7
8	November 11	Denver	L 81–100	Gordon Hayward (22)	Derrick Favors (13)	Jamaal Tinsley (3)	EnergySolutions Arena; 16,866	0–8
9	November 13	New Orleans	W 111–105	Gordon Hayward (27)	Derrick Favors (12)	Gordon Hayward (10)	EnergySolutions Arena; 16,717	1–8
10	November 15	San Antonio	L 82–91	Derrick Favors (20)	Derrick Favors (18)	Alec Burks (4)	EnergySolutions Arena; 17,530	1–9
11	November 16	@ Golden State	L 88–102	Derrick Favors (17)	Derrick Favors (7)	Richard Jefferson (5)	Oracle Arena; 19,596	1–10
12	November 18	Golden State	L 87–98	Gordon Hayward (18)	Marvin Williams (8)	Diante Garrett (5)	EnergySolutions Arena; 16,051	1–11
13	November 20	@ New Orleans	L 98–105	Enes Kanter (19)	Derrick Favors (11)	Gordon Hayward (11)	New Orleans Arena; 13,203	1–12
14	November 22	@ Dallas	L 93–103	Marvin Williams (19)	Derrick Favors (8)	Diante Garrett (8)	American Airlines Center; 19,781	1–13
15	November 24	@ Oklahoma City	L 73–95	Enes Kanter (10)	Derrick Favors (9)	Alec Burks (4)	Chesapeake Energy Arena; 18,203	1–14
16	November 25	Chicago	W 89–83 (OT)	Marvin Williams (17)	Williams & Gobert (9)	Gordon Hayward (12)	EnergySolutions Arena; 18,936	2–14
17	November 29	Phoenix	L 101–112	Marvin Williams (18)	Marvin Williams (7)	Gordon Hayward (6)	EnergySolutions Arena; 18,435	2–15
18	November 30	@ Phoenix	W 112–104	Trey Burke (20)	Derrick Favors (8)	Trey Burke (5)	US Airways Center; 12,957	3–15

December : 7–9 (home: 3–4; road: 4–5)

Game	Date	Team	Score	High points	High rebounds	High assists	Location Attendance	Record
19	December 2	Houston	W 109–103	Gordon Hayward (29)	Derrick Favors (13)	Trey Burke (6)	EnergySolutions Arena; 15,801	4–15
20	December 4	Indiana	L 86–95	Derrick Favors (22)	Derrick Favors (13)	Trey Burke (9)	EnergySolutions Arena; 15,519	4–16
21	December 6	@ Portland	L 98–130	Alec Burks (16)	Jeremy Evans (9)	Diante Garrett (4)	Moda Center; 19,833	4–17
22	December 7	Sacramento	L 102–112 (OT)	Gordon Hayward (22)	Trey Burke (10)	Trey Burke (7)	EnergySolutions Arena; 16,500	4–18
23	December 9	Portland	L 94–105	Alec Burks (20)	Jeremy Evans (8)	Alec Burks (5)	EnergySolutions Arena; 17,555	4–19
24	December 11	@ Sacramento	W 122–101	Richard Jefferson (20)	Derrick Favors (7)	Alec Burks (9)	Sleep Train Arena; 15,198	5–19
25	December 13	@ Denver	W 103–93	Gordon Hayward (30)	Gordon Hayward (13)	Trey Burke (10)	Pepsi Center; 15,616	6–19
26	December 14	San Antonio	L 84–100	Trey Burke (20)	Jeremy Evans (11)	Gordon Hayward (5)	EnergySolutions Arena; 19,330	6–20
27	December 16	@ Miami	L 94–117	Alec Burks (31)	Enes Kanter (8)	Alec Burks (7)	American Airlines Arena; 19,600	6–21
28	December 18	@ Orlando	W 86–82	Trey Burke (30)	Derrick Favors (11)	Trey Burke (8)	Amway Center; 15,574	7–21
29	December 20	@ Atlanta	L 85–118	Alec Burks (13)	Enes Kanter (13)	Alec Burks (4)	Philips Arena; 11,150	7–22
30	December 21	@ Charlotte	W 88–85	Trey Burke (20)	Gordon Hayward (10)	Trey Burke (4)	Time Warner Cable Arena; 18,078	8–22
31	December 23	@ Memphis	L 94–104	Richard Jefferson (18)	Gordon Hayward (11)	Gordon Hayward (9)	FedExForum; 16,665	8–23
32	December 27	L.A. Lakers	W 105–103	Gordon Hayward (24)	Derrick Favors (14)	Gordon Hayward (9)	EnergySolutions Arena; 19,911	9-23
33	December 28	@ L.A. Clippers	L 90–98	Enes Kanter (17)	Enes Kanter (12)	Gordon Hayward (7)	Staples Center; 19,278	9-24
34	December 30	Charlotte	W 83–80	Trey Burke (21)	Marvin Williams (10)	Trey Burke, Gordon Hayward (5)	EnergySolutions Arena; 19,125	10–24

January : 6–6 (home: 5–3; road: 1–3)

Game	Date	Team	Score	High points	High rebounds	High assists	Location Attendance	Record
35	January 2	Milwaukee	W 96–87	Gordon Hayward (22)	Derrick Favors (11)	Trey Burke (4)	EnergySolutions Arena; 16,012	11–24
36	January 3	@ L.A. Lakers	L 99–110	Gordon Hayward (22)	Enes Kanter (10)	Trey Burke (9)	Staples Center; 18,997	11–25
37	January 7	Oklahoma City	W 112–101	Gordon Hayward (37)	Gordon Hayward (11)	Gordon Hayward (7)	EnergySolutions Arena; 18,547	12–25
38	January 10	Cleveland	L 102–113	Richard Jefferson (18)	Enes Kanter (10)	Trey Burke (6)	EnergySolutions Arena; 18,480	12–26
39	January 13	Denver	W 118–103	Alec Burks (34)	Derrick Favors (15)	Trey Burke (8)	EnergySolutions Arena; 17,232	13–26
40	January 15	@ San Antonio	L 105–109	Enes Kanter (25)	Derrick Favors (12)	Trey Burke (11)	AT&T Center; 17,917	13–27
41	January 17	@ Detroit	W 110–89	Trey Burke (20)	Derrick Favors (11)	Trey Burke (12)	Palace of Auburn Hills; 18,528	14–27
42	January 18	@ Minnesota	L 72–98	Alec Burks (18)	Derrick Favors & Jeremy Evans (10)	Alec Burks (4)	Target Center; 17,111	14–28
43	January 21	Minnesota	L 97–112	Gordon Hayward (27)	Enes Kanter & Rudy Gobert (6)	Gordon Hayward & Trey Burke (5)	EnergySolutions Arena; 16,387	14–29
44	January 25	Washington	W 104–101	Enes Kanter (24)	Derrick Favors (14)	Trey Burke (8)	EnergySolutions Arena; 17,754	15–29
45	January 27	Sacramento	W 106–99	Derrick Favors (17)	Derrick Favors (12)	Gordon Hayward (6)	EnergySolutions Arena; 16,663	16–29
46	January 31	Golden State	L 90–95	Alec Burks (26)	Gordon Hayward (9)	Trey Burke (6)	EnergySolutions Arena; 19,911	16–30

February : 5–7 (home: 4–3; road: 1–4)

Game	Date	Team	Score	High points	High rebounds	High assists	Location Attendance	Record
47	February 1	@ L.A. Clippers	L 87–102	Enes Kanter (23)	Enes Kanter (14)	Trey Burke & Marvin Williams (5)	Staples Center; 19,060	16–31
48	February 3	Toronto	L 79–94	Marvin Williams (23)	Marvin Williams & Rudy Gobert (8)	Burke & Hayward (3)	EnergySolutions Arena; 17,139	16–32
49	February 7	@ Dallas	L 81–103	Marvin Williams (21)	Alec Burks (7)	Burke & Hayward (5)	American Airlines Center; 19,928	16–33
50	February 8	Miami	W 94–89	Marvin Williams (23)	Gordon Hayward (9)	Gordon Hayward (11)	EnergySolutions Arena; 19,911	17–33
51	February 11	@ L.A. Lakers	W 96–79	Alec Burks (24)	Enes Kanter (11)	Trey Burke (8)	Staples Center; 18,209	18–33
52	February 12	Philadelphia	W 105–100	Alec Burks (26)	Marvin Williams (14)	Gordon Hayward (7)	EnergySolutions Arena; 19,368	19–33
All-Star Break
53	February 19	Brooklyn	L 99–105	Alec Burks (23)	Jeremy Evans (13)	Trey Burke (10)	EnergySolutions Arena; 17,386	19–34
54	February 21	@ Portland	L 94–102	Enes Kanter (25)	Enes Kanter (10)	Burke & Hayward (7)	Moda Center; 19,998	19–35
55	February 22	Minnesota	L 104–121	Enes Kanter (25)	Rudy Gobert (9)	Trey Burke (6)	EnergySolutions Arena; 19,323	19–36
56	February 24	Boston	W 110–98	Alec Burks (21)	Marvin Williams (7)	Gordon Hayward (10)	EnergySolutions Arena; 17,130	20–36
57	February 26	Phoenix	W 109–86	Hayward & Jefferson (17)	Gordon Hayward (10)	Gordon Hayward (9)	EnergySolutions Arena; 19,639	21–36
58	February 28	@ Cleveland	L 79–99	Gordon Hayward (18)	Gordon Hayward (7)	Gordon Hayward (7)	Quicken Loans Arena; 18,601	21–37

March : 2–15 (home: 1–6; road: 1–9)

Game	Date	Team	Score	High points	High rebounds	High assists	Location Attendance	Record
59	March 2	@ Indiana	L 91–94	Gordon Hayward (21)	Derrick Favors (10)	Alec Burks (7)	Bankers Life Fieldhouse; 18,165	21–38
60	March 3	@ Milwaukee	L 88–114	Enes Kanter (27)	Enes Kanter (14)	Trey Burke (5)	BMO Harris Bradley Center; 10,022	21–39
61	March 5	@ Washington	L 91–104	Alec Burks (19)	Marvin Williams (6)	Gordon Hayward (6)	Verizon Center; 13,911	21–40
62	March 7	@ New York	L 81–108	Hayward & Burks (18)	Favors & Kanter (10)	Gordon Hayward (5)	Madison Square Garden; 19,812	21–41
63	March 8	@ Philadelphia	W 104–92	Gordon Hayward (22)	Derrick Favors (14)	Hayward & Burke (8)	Wells Fargo Center; 13,569	22–41
64	March 10	Atlanta	L 110–112	Trey Burke (23)	Favors & Kanter (9)	Gordon Hayward (7)	EnergySolutions Arena; 17,774	22–42
65	March 12	Dallas	L 101–108	Trey Burke (20)	Enes Kanter (11)	Trey Burke (8)	EnergySolutions Arena; 17,982	22–43
66	March 14	L.A. Clippers	L 87–96	Favors & Burke (18)	Enes Kanter (15)	Gordon Hayward (10)	EnergySolutions Arena; 19,381	22–44
67	March 16	@ San Antonio	L 104–122	Derrick Favors (28)	Enes Kanter (11)	Gordon Hayward (6)	AT&T Center; 18,242	22–45
68	March 17	@ Houston	L 86–124	Favors & Burks (15)	Enes Kanter (9)	Trey Burke (5)	Toyota Center; 18,156	22–46
69	March 19	@ Memphis	L 86–96	Hayward, Burke & Burks (16)	Enes Kanter (9)	Trey Burke (5)	FedExForum; 17,011	22–47
70	March 22	Orlando	W 89–88	Richard Jefferson (21)	Derrick Favors (12)	Gordon Hayward (6)	EnergySolutions Arena; 19,228	23–47
71	March 24	Detroit	L 94–114	Gordon Hayward (32)	Derrick Favors (9)	Gordon Hayward (6)	EnergySolutions Arena; 17,595	23–48
72	March 26	Memphis	L 87–91	Derrick Favors (22)	Enes Kanter (15)	Trey Burke (10)	EnergySolutions Arena; 19,081	23–49
73	March 28	@ New Orleans	L 95–102	Gordon Hayward (21)	Derrick Favors (11)	Gordon Hayward (7)	Smoothie King Center; 17,699	23–50
74	March 30	@ Oklahoma City	L 96–116	Enes Kanter (18)	Derrick Favors (13)	Gordon Hayward (9)	Chesapeake Energy Arena; 18,203	23–51
75	March 31	New York	L 83–92	Gordon Hayward (18)	Derrick Favors (13)	Alec Burks (4)	EnergySolutions Arena; 18,653	23–52

April : 2–5 (home: 1–3; road: 1–2)

Game	Date	Team	Score	High points	High rebounds	High assists	Location Attendance	Record
76	April 4	New Orleans	W 100–96	Hayward & Burks (21)	Derrick Favors (9)	Alec Burks (8)	EnergySolutions Arena; 19,681	24–52
77	April 6	@ Golden State	L 102–130	Burke & Burks (24)	Enes Kanter (12)	Trey Burke (15)	Oracle Arena; 19,596	24–53
78	April 8	Dallas	L 83–95	Derrick Favors (19)	Enes Kanter (19)	Burke & Hayward (5)	EnergySolutions Arena; 18,102	24–54
79	April 11	Portland	L 99–111	Derrick Favors (23)	Enes Kanter (14)	Trey Burke (8)	EnergySolutions Arena; 19,248	24–55
80	April 12	@ Denver	L 94–101	Gordon Hayward (32)	Enes Kanter (13)	Trey Burke (11)	Pepsi Center; 18,832	24–56
81	April 14	L.A. Lakers	L 104–119	Alec Burks (22)	Enes Kanter (12)	Trey Burke (7)	EnergySolutions Arena; 19,911	24–57
82	April 16	@ Minnesota	W 136–130 (2OT)	Trey Burke (32)	Derrick Favors (12)	Burke & Hayward (9)	Target Center; 14,155	25-57

2013–14 season schedule
