= Alec Burks =

American basketball player (born 1991)

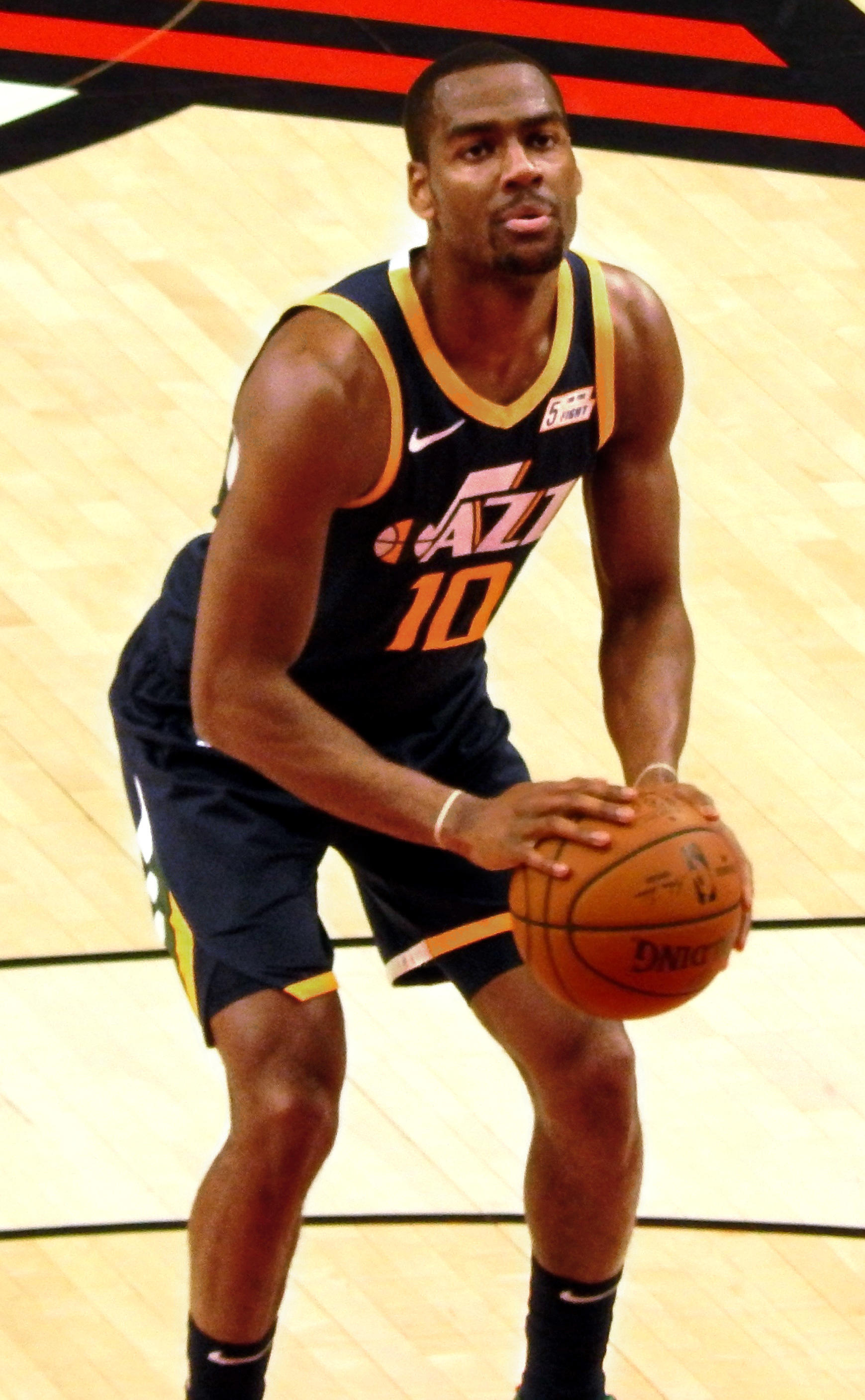
- Burks with the Utah Jazz in 2018

Free agent
- Position: Shooting guard

Personal information
- Born: July 20, 1991 (age 35) Grandview, Missouri, U.S.
- Listed height: 6 ft 5 in (1.96 m)
- Listed weight: 214 lb (97 kg)

Career information
- High school: Grandview (Grandview, Missouri)
- College: Colorado (2009–2011)
- NBA draft: 2011: 1st round, 12th overall pick
- Drafted by: Utah Jazz
- Playing career: 2011–present

Career history
- 2011–2018: Utah Jazz
- 2017: →Salt Lake City Stars
- 2018–2019: Cleveland Cavaliers
- 2019: Sacramento Kings
- 2019–2020: Golden State Warriors
- 2020: Philadelphia 76ers
- 2020–2022: New York Knicks
- 2022–2024: Detroit Pistons
- 2024: New York Knicks
- 2024–2025: Miami Heat

Career highlights
- First-team All-Big 12 (2011); Big 12 Freshman of the Year (2010); Big 12 All-Rookie Team (2010)
- Stats at NBA.com
- Stats at Basketball Reference

Alec Burks (born July 20, 1991) is an American professional basketball player who last played for the Miami Heat of the National Basketball Association (NBA). He was selected by the Utah Jazz as the 12th overall pick in the 2011 NBA draft. Burks primarily plays the shooting guard position.

He played for the Colorado Buffaloes men's basketball team during his college years and was most notably the school's first-ever Big 12 Conference Freshman of the Year in 2010. As a sophomore, Burks was statistically the eighteenth-best scorer in the Division I. With Colorado, he missed only a single college game. Burks also gained national attention after being selected to the Big 12 First Team in his second season with the Buffaloes. He entered the 2011 NBA draft shortly after his sophomore year, projected to be a first-round draft pick despite playing just two seasons at Colorado.

== High school career ==
Burks attended Grandview High School, where in 2009 he was named the Gatorade Player of the Year in the state of Missouri. As a senior, he averaged 23.0 points, 6.8 rebounds, 3.0 assists and 1.6 steals per game. He was also named the Kansas City Star and Metro Sports Player of the Year during his senior year.

Prior to his senior year of high school, Burks signed with Colorado during the November 2008 signing period.

Considered a three-star recruit by 247Sports.com, Burks was listed as the No. 49 shooting guard and the No. 196 player in the nation in 2009.

== College career ==
In his freshman year at Colorado, Burks was awarded the 2010 Big 12 Conference Freshman of the Year, while also being named in the Big 12 All-Rookie team.

In his sophomore year, he was named in the All-Big 12 first team.

In April 2011, Burks decided to forgo his two remaining eligible college years to enter the NBA draft.

== Professional career ==
=== Utah Jazz (2011–2018) ===
Burks was selected with the 12th overall pick in the 2011 NBA draft by the Utah Jazz. On December 9, 2011, he signed his rookie scale contract with the Jazz. On October 25, 2012, the Jazz exercised their third-year team option on Burks' rookie scale contract, extending the contract through the 2013–14 season. On October 29, 2013, the Jazz exercised their fourth-year team option on Burks' rookie scale contract, extending the contract through the 2014–15 season.

On January 13, 2014, Burks scored a career-high 34 points in a 118–103 win over the Denver Nuggets.

On October 31, 2014, Burks signed a four-year, $42 million contract extension with the Jazz. On December 30, he was ruled out for the rest of the 2014–15 season due to a shoulder injury.

On December 27, 2015, Burks was ruled out for six weeks with an ankle fracture. Two days later, he elected to undergo surgery on his fractured left fibula. On April 8, 2016, he returned to action after missing 50 games with the injury. In 13 minutes off the bench, he scored 11 points on 4-of-5 shooting in a 102–99 overtime loss to the Los Angeles Clippers.

On November 1, 2016, Burks was ruled out indefinitely after undergoing an arthroscopic procedure to debride his left ankle. On January 9, 2017, he spent a day with Utah's D-League affiliate, the Salt Lake City Stars. He was reassigned to Salt Lake City on January 11, and then recalled the next day after appearing in a game for the Stars. On January 21, 2017, he came off the bench for the Jazz and scored a season-high 13 points in a season-high 18 minutes in a 109–100 win over the Indiana Pacers. Seven days later, he set a new season high with 15 points in a 102–95 loss to the Memphis Grizzlies.

On November 30, 2017, Burks scored a season-high 28 points off the bench in a 126–107 win over the Los Angeles Clippers. On December 4, 2017, he scored 27 points in a 116–69 win over the Washington Wizards for his third straight game with 20 or more—his best string since three straight 20-point games in February 2014.

On November 5, 2018, Burks scored a season-high 22 points, alongside three assists, in a 124–111 loss to the Toronto Raptors.

=== Cleveland Cavaliers (2018–2019) ===
On November 29, 2018, Burks was traded, along with two future second-round picks, to the Cleveland Cavaliers in exchange for Kyle Korver. Burks made his Cavaliers debut the next day, recording 15 points, six rebounds, four assists and two steals in a 128–95 loss to the Boston Celtics. On December 3, he made a game-winning dunk with 3.2 seconds left to give the Cavaliers a 99–97 win over the Brooklyn Nets. He also had 13 points and seven rebounds in the game. On December 7, Burks tied his season high of 22 points, alongside seven rebounds and a season-high nine assists, in a 129–110 loss to the Sacramento Kings. On January 13, 2019, he had 17 points and a season-high 13 rebounds in a 101–95 win over the Los Angeles Lakers.

=== Sacramento Kings (2019) ===
On February 7, 2019, Burks was traded to the Sacramento Kings in a three-team trade involving the Houston Rockets. He made his Kings debut a day later, recording nine points and four rebounds in a 102–96 win over the Miami Heat.

=== Golden State Warriors (2019–2020) ===
On July 11, 2019, Burks signed with the Golden State Warriors. He made his Warriors debut on October 30, recording seven points and two assists in a 121–110 loss to the Phoenix Suns. On January 20, 2020, Burks scored a season-high 33 points, alongside seven rebounds, eight assists and three blocks, in a 129–124 overtime loss to the Portland Trail Blazers. On January 30, he switched his jersey number from 8 to 20 out of respect for the late Kobe Bryant, who died in a helicopter crash four days earlier.

=== Philadelphia 76ers (2020) ===
On February 6, 2020, Burks was traded, alongside Glenn Robinson III, to the Philadelphia 76ers in exchange for three future second-round picks. Burks made his 76ers debut on February 11, recording two points and two assists in a 110–103 win over the Los Angeles Clippers. The 76ers faced the Boston Celtics during their first round playoff series, but they were eliminated in a four-game sweep.

=== New York Knicks (2020–2022) ===
On November 22, 2020, Burks signed a one-year, $6 million contract with the New York Knicks. He made his Knicks debut on December 23, recording 22 points, four rebounds and three assists in a 121–107 loss to the Indiana Pacers. On May 13, 2021, Burks scored a season-high 30 points, alongside ten rebounds and two assists, in a 102–98 win over the San Antonio Spurs. He helped the Knicks qualify for the playoffs for the first time since 2013, and they faced the Atlanta Hawks during their first-round series. On May 23, Burks recorded 27 points, three rebounds and four assists in a 107–105 Game 1 loss. The Knicks ended up losing the series in five games.

On August 18, 2021, Burks re-signed with the Knicks on a three-year, $30 million contract. On December 29, he scored a career-high 34 points, alongside four rebounds, two assists and three steals, in a 94–85 win over the Detroit Pistons. The Knicks failed to qualify for the playoffs during the 2021–22 season, finishing with a 37–45 record.

=== Detroit Pistons (2022–2024) ===
On July 11, 2022, Burks was traded, alongside Nerlens Noel, to the Detroit Pistons in exchange for the draft rights to Nikola Radičević and a 2025 protected second-round pick. Burks made his Pistons debut on November 11, recording 17 points and two rebounds in a 121–112 loss to the New York Knicks.

On June 29, 2023, the Detroit Pistons exercised Burks' team option for the 2023–24 NBA season. On January 16, 2024, Burks tied a career–high in points, registering 34 points while going 11–for–17 on field goals against the Washington Wizards.

=== Return to the Knicks (2024) ===
On February 8, 2024, Burks and Bojan Bogdanović were traded to the New York Knicks in exchange for Ryan Arcidiacono, Malachi Flynn, Evan Fournier, Quentin Grimes and two second-round picks.

=== Miami Heat (2024–2025) ===
On July 4, 2024, Burks signed with the Miami Heat.

== Career statistics ==
Legend
GP	Games played	GS	Games started	MPG	Minutes per game
FG%	Field goal percentage	3P%	3-point field goal percentage	FT%	Free throw percentage
RPG	Rebounds per game	APG	Assists per game	SPG	Steals per game
BPG	Blocks per game	PPG	Points per game	**Bold**	Career high

=== NBA ===
==== Regular season ====
Year	Team	GP	GS	MPG	FG%	3P%	FT%	RPG	APG	SPG	BPG	PPG
2011–12	Utah	59	0	15.9	.429	.333	.727	2.2	.9	.5	.1	7.2
2012–13	Utah	64	0	17.8	.420	.359	.713	2.3	1.4	.5	.2	7.0
2013–14	Utah	78	12	28.1	.457	.350	.748	3.3	2.7	.9	.2	14.0
2014–15	Utah	27	27	**33.3**	.403	.382	.822	4.2	3.0	.6	.2	13.9
2015–16	Utah	31	3	25.7	.410	.405	.752	3.5	2.0	.6	.1	13.3
2016–17	Utah	42	0	15.5	.399	.329	.769	2.9	.7	.4	.1	6.7
2017–18	Utah	64	1	16.5	.411	.331	.863	3.0	1.0	.6	.1	7.7
2018–19	Utah	17	0	15.8	.412	.372	.868	1.6	1.2	.4	.2	8.4
2018–19	Cleveland	34	24	28.8	.400	.378	.806	**5.5**	2.9	.7	**.5**	8.4
2018–19	Sacramento	13	0	9.7	.450	.000	.800	1.7	.8	.6	.1	1.7
2019–20	Golden State	48	18	29.0	.406	.375	.897	4.7	**3.1**	1.0	.4	**16.1**
2019–20	Philadelphia	18	1	20.2	**.461**	.416	.829	3.1	2.1	.7	.0	12.2
2020–21	New York	49	5	25.6	.420	.415	.856	4.6	2.2	.6	.3	12.7
2021–22	New York	**81**	**44**	28.6	.391	.404	.822	4.9	3.0	**1.0**	.3	11.7
2022–23	Detroit	51	8	22.0	.436	.414	.814	3.1	2.2	.7	.2	12.8
2023–24	Detroit	43	0	20.9	.394	.401	**.903**	2.6	1.6	.5	.3	12.6
2023–24	New York	23	1	13.5	.307	.301	.727	1.7	.9	.3	.0	6.5
2024–25	Miami	49	14	17.6	.424	**.425**	.776	2.5	1.1	.6	.1	7.3
Career		791	158	22.2	.415	.386	.805	3.3	1.9	.7	.2	10.6

==== Playoffs ====
Year	Team	GP	GS	MPG	FG%	3P%	FT%	RPG	APG	SPG	BPG	PPG
2012	Utah	4	0	15.8	.250	.000	.857	2.8	.8	**.5**	.0	6.5
2018	Utah	**9**	0	13.4	.469	.450	**.867**	2.7	1.9	.4	.1	9.1
2020	Philadelphia	4	0	23.7	.327	.188	.778	3.8	1.8	.3	**.8**	10.5
2021	New York	5	0	**25.6**	.429	.333	.737	**5.0**	**2.6**	.2	.0	14.0
2024	New York	6	0	20.1	.500	.429	.844	3.3	1.0	.2	.2	**14.8**
2025	Miami	1	1	15.0	**.667**	**.667**	–	2.0	2.0	.0	.0	6.0
Career		29	1	18.7	.416	.366	.820	3.3	1.7	.3	.2	10.9

=== College ===
Year	Team	GP	GS	MPG	FG%	3P%	FT%	RPG	APG	SPG	BPG	PPG
2009–10	Colorado	30	30	30.2	.538	.352	.772	5.0	1.8	1.2	.4	17.1
2010–11	Colorado	38	37	31.4	.469	.292	.825	6.5	2.9	1.1	.3	20.5

== Personal life ==
Burks is the son of Steve and Dina Burks. He also has an older brother, Steve Jr.
