= Ian Clark (basketball) =

American basketball player (born 1991)

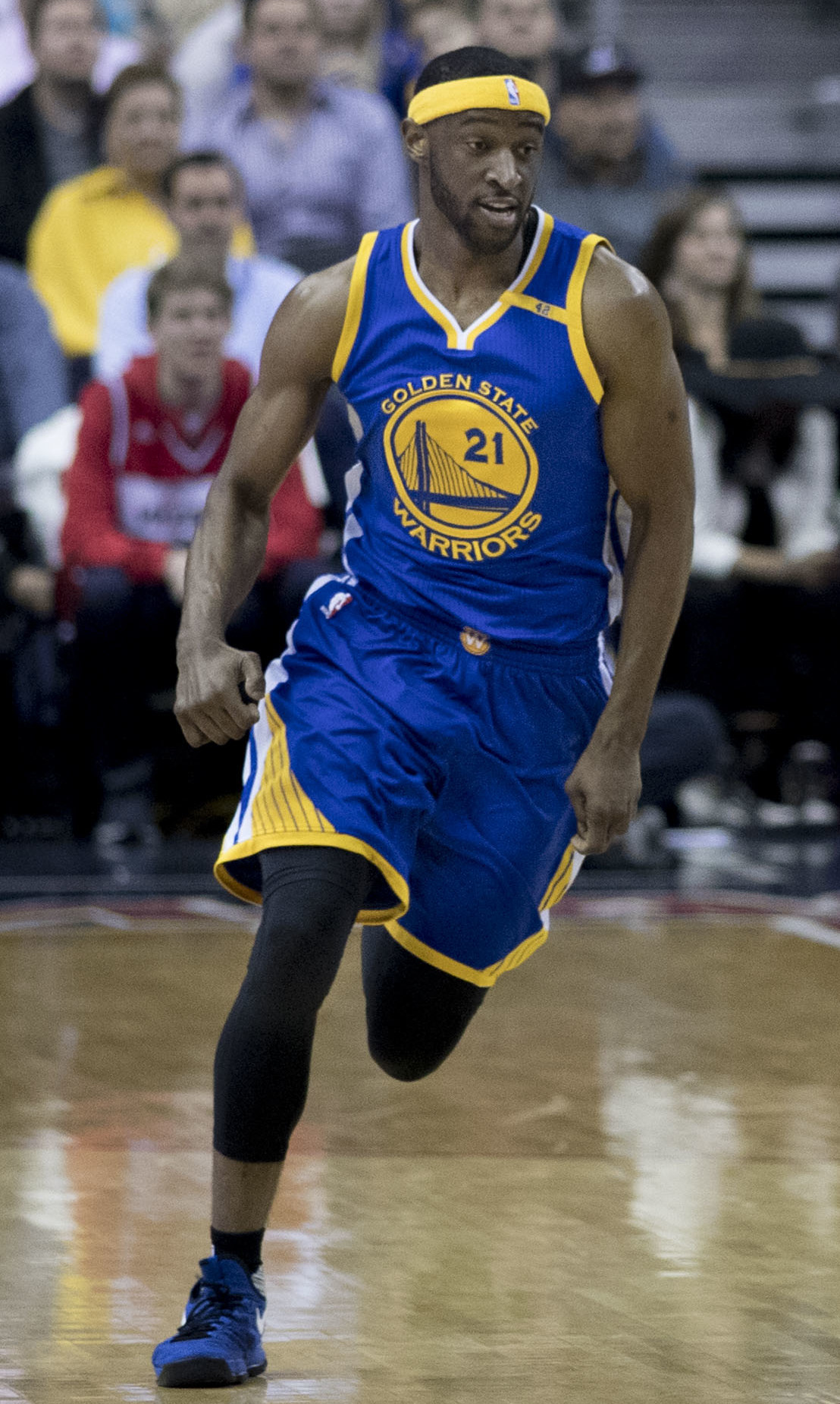
- Clark with the Golden State Warriors in 2017

Free agent
- Position: Shooting guard

Personal information
- Born: March 7, 1991 (age 35) Memphis, Tennessee, U.S.
- Listed height: 6 ft 3 in (190 cm)
- Listed weight: 174 lb (79 kg)

Career information
- High school: Germantown (Germantown, Tennessee)
- College: Belmont (2009–2013)
- NBA draft: 2013: undrafted
- Playing career: 2013–present

Career history
- 2013–2015: Utah Jazz
- 2013–2014: →Bakersfield Jam
- 2015: →Idaho Stampede
- 2015: Denver Nuggets
- 2015–2017: Golden State Warriors
- 2017–2019: New Orleans Pelicans
- 2019–2021: Xinjiang Flying Tigers
- 2022: Sydney Kings
- 2022–2023: Adelaide 36ers
- 2023–2025: Melbourne United
- 2025–2026: South East Melbourne Phoenix
- 2026: Cangrejeros de Santurce

Career highlights
- NBL champion (2022); NBA champion (2017); NBL Best Sixth Man (2024); AP Honorable Mention All-American (2013); OVC co-Player of the Year (2013); OVC Defensive Player of the Year (2013); First-team All-OVC (2013); 2× First-team All-Atlantic Sun (2011, 2012); Second-team All-Atlantic Sun (2010); Atlantic Sun Freshman of the Year (2010); No. 21 retired by Belmont Bruins
- Stats at NBA.com
- Stats at Basketball Reference

Ian Patrick Clark (born March 7, 1991) is an American professional basketball player who last played for the Cangrejeros de Santurce of the Baloncesto Superior Nacional (BSN). He played college basketball for the Belmont Bruins, where he earned Ohio Valley Conference Co-Player of the Year as a senior. Clark played six seasons in the NBA, including two with the Golden State Warriors, where he won an NBA championship in 2017. After two seasons in China, Clark debuted in the Australian NBL in 2022 and won a championship with the Sydney Kings.

== High school career ==
Clark was born in Memphis, Tennessee. He attended Germantown High School in Germantown, Tennessee, where he was a four-year varsity letter winner. In his final three seasons, Clark led the team in scoring, culminating in a senior season that saw him average 23 points, 5.0 rebounds, and 5.0 assists per game. Clark was a three-time all-metro selection by The Commercial Appeal, and in 2009, he was an all-region selection. Clark's Belmont player biography describes him in high school as "[a] dynamic, multi-dimensional guard who could make an instant impact on both ends of the floor."

== College career ==
When Clark enrolled at Belmont University as a freshman in 2009–10, the school was still in the Atlantic Sun Conference (A-Sun). He made an immediate impact as its Freshman of the Year as well as being named to the A-Sun Second Team. Clark averaged 14.9 points and 3.3 rebounds per game and was named a Mid-Major Freshman All-American by CollegeInsider.com.

The following year, Clark was named to the A-Sun First Team as the Bruins went 19–1 in conference play to win the A-Sun regular season championship. They also won the conference tournament championship and Clark was named to the all-tournament team. The Bruins earned an automatic berth into the NCAA Tournament but lost to Wisconsin in the Round of 64.

In 2011–12, for the second season in a row, Clark was named to the A-Sun's First Team. The Bruins also repeated as regular season and conference tournament champions, qualified for the NCAA Tournament, but once again lost in the Round of 64. In Belmont's last season in the Atlantic Sun Conference, Clark averaged 12.7 points, 2.6 rebounds, 2.4 assists and 1.0 steals per game. In his final collegiate season in 2012–13, the team moved into the Ohio Valley Conference, and Clark led Belmont to their third straight regular season and conference championships, thus a third straight automatic bid to the NCAA Tournament. In the 2013 OVC championship game, Clark out-dueled 2012 OVC Player of the Year and consensus All-American, Isaiah Canaan, as the Bruins prevailed 70–68 in overtime. However, the Bruins lost in the NCAA Tournament's Round of 64 to Arizona. For the year, Clark averaged 18.2 points, 3.3 rebounds, 2.4 assists, and 1.6 steals; he also shot 45.9% from beyond the arc, which was good enough to be ranked third nationally. At the end of the season, Clark was named the Co-OVC Player of the Year with Canaan as well as the OVC's Defensive Player of the Year.

Clark started every game of his college career.

On January 8, 2025, Belmont announced that Clark's No. 21 jersey will be retired. He became the third Belmont men's basketball player to receive this honor.

== Professional career ==
=== Utah Jazz (2013–2015) ===
After going undrafted in the 2013 NBA draft, Clark signed to play in both NBA Summer Leagues, for the Miami Heat and then for the Golden State Warriors. He subsequently won the Most Valuable Player of the Las Vegas Summer League championship game as he led the Warriors with 33 points, helping them defeat the Phoenix Suns 91–77. On July 29, Clark signed a two-year contract with the Utah Jazz after his performance in Las Vegas impressed numerous teams.

On December 14, 2013, Clark was assigned to the Bakersfield Jam of the NBA Development League. He was recalled by the Jazz on December 21, reassigned on January 4, and recalled again on January 13.

On February 24, 2015, Clark was assigned to the Idaho Stampede. On March 17, he was recalled by the Jazz. On March 26, Clark was waived by the Jazz.

=== Denver Nuggets (2015) ===
On March 28, 2015, Clark was claimed off waivers by the Denver Nuggets.

=== Golden State Warriors (2015–2017) ===
On September 25, 2015, Clark signed with the Golden State Warriors. On December 30, he scored a then career-high 21 points in a 114–91 loss to the Dallas Mavericks. On April 13, 2016, the Warriors broke the single season record with 73 wins, eclipsing the 72 wins set by the 1995–96 Chicago Bulls. The Warriors made it to the 2016 NBA Finals after overcoming a 3–1 deficit to the Oklahoma City Thunder in the Western Conference Finals to win the series in seven games. Clark made his first appearance in the NBA Finals during a Game 1 104–89 victory over the Cleveland Cavaliers. The Warriors were defeated by the Cavaliers in seven games despite a 3–1 lead.

On July 8, 2016, Clark re-signed with the Warriors. On November 1, he scored a career-high 22 points in a 127–104 victory over the Portland Trail Blazers. Clark topped that mark on December 17, scoring 23 points during a 135–90 victory over the Portland Trail Blazers. On March 11, 2017, Clark set a new career high with 36 points in a 107–85 loss to the San Antonio Spurs. The Warriors finished the season as the top seed in the West with a 67–15 record. Following a 129–115 victory in Game 4 of the Western Conference Finals over the Spurs, the Warriors reached their third straight NBA Finals series while becoming the first team in league history to start the playoffs 12–0. Clark won his first NBA championship when the Warriors defeated the Cavaliers in five games during the 2017 NBA Finals. The Warriors finished the playoffs with a 16–1 record, the best postseason winning percentage in NBA history.

=== New Orleans Pelicans (2017–2019) ===
On August 3, 2017, Clark signed with the New Orleans Pelicans. On January 30, 2018, he scored a season-high 20 points in a 114–103 loss to the Sacramento Kings.

On July 9, 2018, Clark re-signed with the Pelicans.

=== Xinjiang Flying Tigers (2019–2021) ===
On August 19, 2019, Clark signed with the Xinjiang Flying Tigers of the Chinese Basketball Association. The 2019–20 CBA season was disrupted due to the COVID-19 pandemic. He appeared in only three games for the team, all in January 2020.

Clark returned to the Xinjiang Flying Tigers during the 2020–21 CBA season, playing 14 games between March 9 and April 18.

=== Sydney Kings (2022) ===
On February 12, 2022, Clark signed with the Sydney Kings of the Australian National Basketball League (NBL) for the rest of the 2021–22 season. He helped the Kings win the NBL championship in May 2022.

=== Adelaide 36ers (2022–2023) ===
On December 20, 2022, Clark signed with the Adelaide 36ers for the rest of the 2022–23 NBL season.

=== Melbourne United (2023–2025) ===
On August 4, 2023, Clark signed with Melbourne United for the 2023–24 NBL season.

On July 25, 2024, Clark re-signed with United for the 2024–25 NBL season. On March 4, 2025, he scored a career-high 38 points in a narrow 113–112 victory over the Perth Wildcats in game three of the semi-finals series.

=== Cangrejeros de Santurce (2025) ===
In April 2025, Clark signed with Cangrejeros de Santurce of the Baloncesto Superior Nacional. Alongside teammate Kenneth Faried, they were able to push the number 1 seed Vaqueros de Bayamón to 7 games in the conference finals, but ultimately losing the game.

=== South East Melbourne Phoenix (2025–2026) ===
On December 27, 2025, Clark signed with the South East Melbourne Phoenix for the rest of the 2025–26 NBL season. In game three of the semi-final series, Clark scored a team-high 32 points in a 108–96 season-ending loss to the Adelaide 36ers.

=== Cangrejeros de Santurce (2026) ===
On May 14, 2026, Clark returned to Santurce to replace Malik Beasley. In his return, he had 21 points in a blowout win against the Gigantes de Carolina.

== Career statistics ==
Legend
GP	Games played	GS	Games started	MPG	Minutes per game
FG%	Field goal percentage	3P%	3-point field goal percentage	FT%	Free throw percentage
RPG	Rebounds per game	APG	Assists per game	SPG	Steals per game
BPG	Blocks per game	PPG	Points per game	**Bold**	Career high
†	Won an NBA championship

=== NBA ===
==== Regular season ====
Year	Team	GP	GS	MPG	FG%	3P%	FT%	RPG	APG	SPG	BPG	PPG
2013–14	Utah	23	0	7.5	.388	.355	.714	.8	.7	.3	.1	3.0
2014–15	Utah	23	0	7.0	.341	.360	**1.000**	.6	.4	.3	.1	1.9
2014–15	Denver	7	0	4.4	.364	.200	**1.000**	.4	.3	.4	.1	1.9
2015–16	Golden State	66	1	8.8	.441	.357	.824	1.0	1.0	.3	**.2**	3.6
2016–17†	Golden State	**77**	0	14.8	**.487**	**.374**	.759	1.6	1.2	**.5**	.1	6.8
2017–18	New Orleans	74	2	**19.7**	.448	.318	.763	**1.7**	1.5	.4	.1	**7.4**
2018–19	New Orleans	60	**6**	16.2	.394	.327	.893	1.5	**1.6**	.4	.1	6.7
Career		330	9	13.7	.439	.340	.804	1.3	1.2	.4	.1	5.6

==== Playoffs ====
Year	Team	GP	GS	MPG	FG%	3P%	FT%	RPG	APG	SPG	BPG	PPG
2016	Golden State	**16**	0	9.6	.491	.333	.800	1.1	1.0	.5	.0	4.1
2017†	Golden State	**16**	0	13.7	**.506**	**.361**	.941	**1.6**	.7	.4	.0	6.8
2018	New Orleans	9	0	**21.1**	.424	.357	**1.000**	1.1	**1.2**	**.9**	**.2**	**7.8**
Career		41	0	13.7	.475	.354	.903	1.3	.9	.5	.0	6.0

=== College ===
Year	Team	GP	GS	MPG	FG%	3P%	FT%	RPG	APG	SPG	BPG	PPG
2009–10	Belmont	31	31	29.6	.453	.402	.775	**3.3**	2.2	1.1	**.3**	14.9
2010–11	Belmont	**35**	**35**	24.6	.482	.431	.818	2.3	1.8	1.2	.2	12.2
2011–12	Belmont	34	33	27.6	.451	.405	.822	2.6	**2.4**	1.0	.1	12.7
2012–13	Belmont	33	32	**33.4**	**.543**	**.459**	**.833**	**3.3**	**2.4**	**1.6**	.2	**18.2**
Career		133	131	28.7	.484	.425	.810	2.9	2.2	1.2	.2	14.4
