= Derrick Favors =

American basketball player (born 1991)

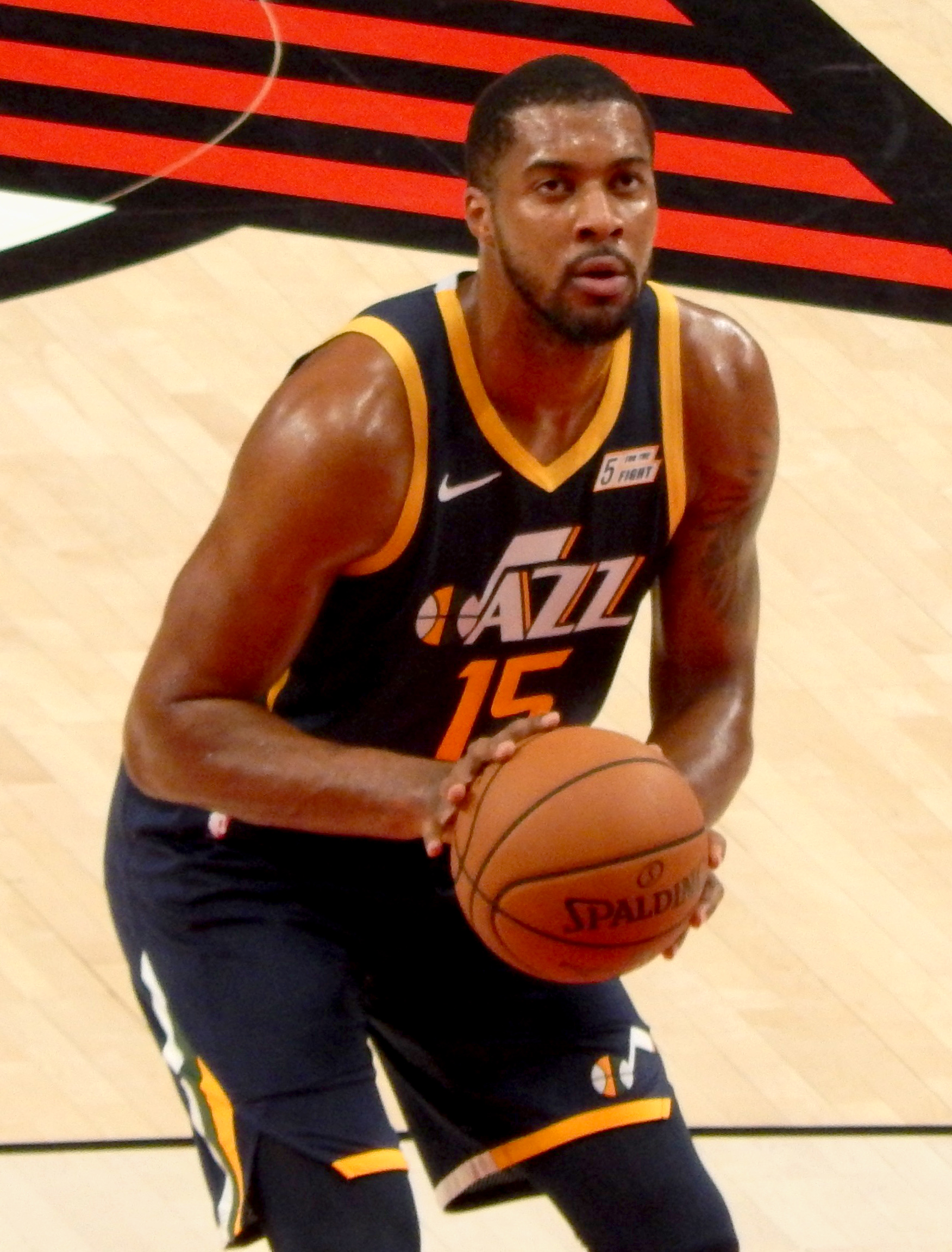
- Favors with the Utah Jazz in 2018

Free agent
- Position: Center / power forward

Personal information
- Born: July 15, 1991 (age 35) Atlanta, Georgia, U.S.
- Listed height: 6 ft 9 in (2.06 m)
- Listed weight: 265 lb (120 kg)

Career information
- High school: South Atlanta (Atlanta, Georgia)
- College: Georgia Tech (2009–2010)
- NBA draft: 2010: 1st round, 3rd overall pick
- Drafted by: New Jersey Nets
- Playing career: 2010–present

Career history
- 2010–2011: New Jersey Nets
- 2011–2019: Utah Jazz
- 2019–2020: New Orleans Pelicans
- 2020–2021: Utah Jazz
- 2021–2022: Oklahoma City Thunder
- 2023–2024: Windy City Bulls

Career highlights
- NBA All-Rookie Second Team (2011); ACC Rookie of the Year (2010); National high school player of the year (2009); McDonald's All-American Game MVP (2009); First-team Parade All-American (2009); Second-team Parade All-American (2008); Mr. Georgia Basketball (2009)
- Stats at NBA.com
- Stats at Basketball Reference

Derrick Bernard Favors (born July 15, 1991) is an American professional basketball player who last played for the Windy City Bulls of the NBA G League. Favors played college basketball for the Georgia Tech Yellow Jackets for one season before being selected by the New Jersey Nets with the third overall pick of the 2010 NBA draft.

After playing a season with the Nets, Favors was traded to the Utah Jazz in 2011, where he played for eight seasons. In the 2019 offseason, he was traded to the New Orleans Pelicans. He then returned to the Jazz in the 2020–2021 season after playing a year with the Pelicans.

During his second stint with the Utah Jazz, Favors became the franchise's 10th all-time leading scorer when he passed Mehmet Okur.

== High school career ==
Favors played high school basketball at South Atlanta High School, where he was ranked as one of the best high school basketball players in the class of 2009. Scout.com rated him the #1 player in the country, #2 in the ESPNU100, and #4 by Rivals.com. On March 14, 2009, he led South Atlanta to the Georgia Class AAA state championship. He scored 38 points and had 21 rebounds in the championship game against Westover High School. He was named to the 2009 McDonald's All-American Team. He led the East to a 113–110 victory and was named the MVP of the game. He scored 19 points and had 8 rebounds. Favors was selected to participate in the 2009 Nike Hoop Summit in Portland, Oregon but pulled out for personal reasons and he was also selected to play in the 2009 Jordan Brand Classic at Madison Square Garden where he scored a game-high 21 points and was named MVP for the black team, while Renardo Sidney was named MVP for the white team. He finished his senior season averaging 28.1 points, 13.3 rebounds, 5.0 blocks, 3.0 steals and 2.0 assists per game and holds the career records in points (2,341), rebounds (1,511) and blocked shots (741).

== College career ==
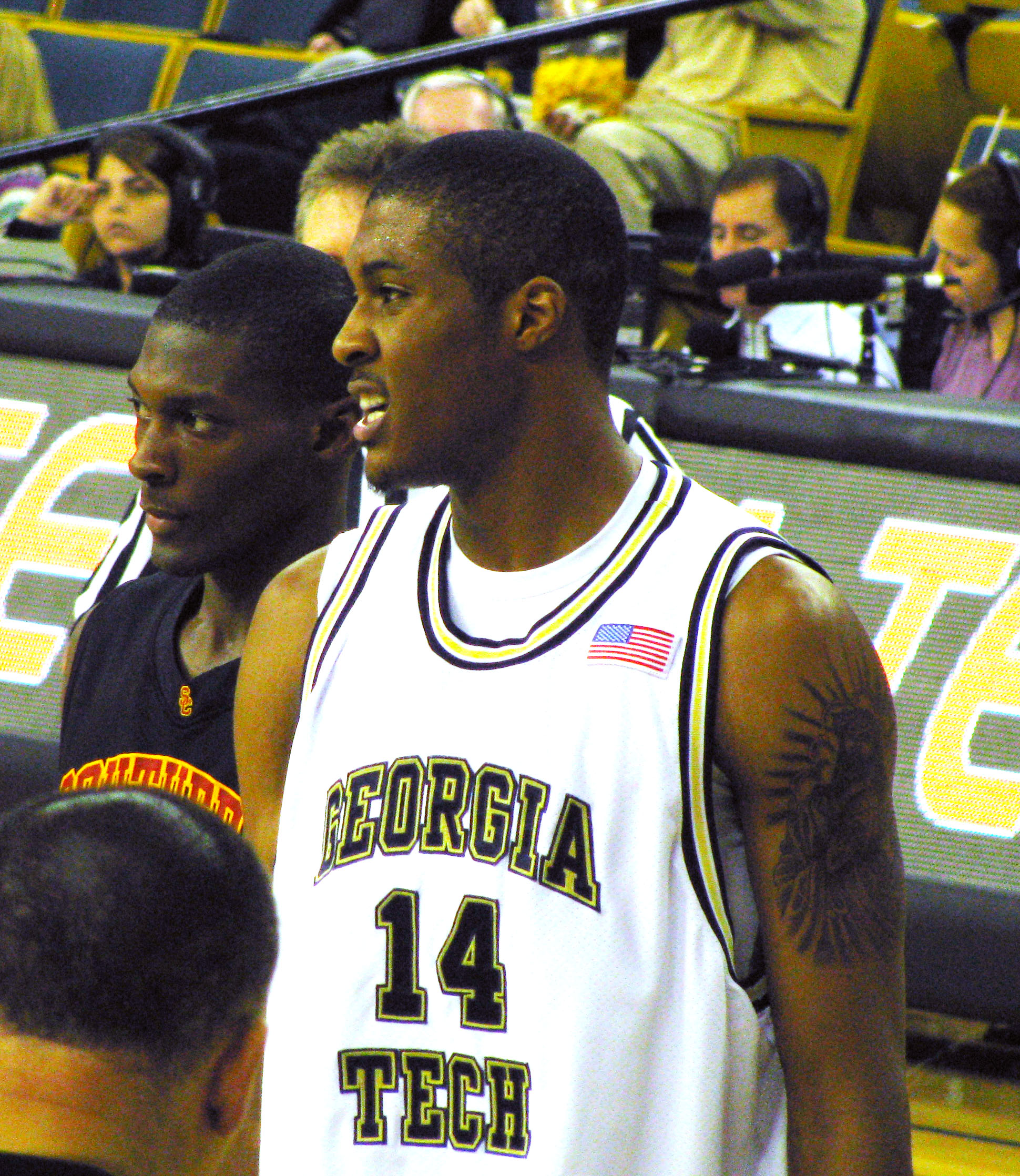
Favors with Georgia Tech in 2010

Favors committed to Georgia Tech in January 2009, which he chose over Georgia and North Carolina State.

Favors played both power forward and center for Paul Hewitt's Yellow Jackets. The frontcourt consisted of a three-man rotation of Favors, Gani Lawal and Zach Peacock. In ACC games, he averaged 11.8 points and 8.7 rebounds per game and shot 62.5% from the field. He also helped lead the Yellow Jackets to the ACC tournament finals against Duke. During the tournament, he posted 17 points, 9.8 rebounds and 3 blocks per game.

Favors was named ACC Rookie of the Year and to the ACC All-Freshman Team.

== Professional career ==
=== New Jersey Nets (2010–2011) ===
On April 9, 2010, Favors announced he would forgo his final three years of college eligibility to enter the 2010 NBA draft where he was subsequently selected with the third overall pick by the New Jersey Nets. Favors was 19 years 104 days when he made his NBA debut, thus becoming the youngest player ever to set foot on court for the Nets. In just his third game with the Nets on October 31, 2010, against Miami, he recorded his first career double-double with 13 points and 13 rebounds (10 offensive) in a 101–78 loss.

=== Utah Jazz (2011–2019) ===
On February 23, 2011, Favors was traded, along with Devin Harris, two future first-round picks, and cash considerations to the Utah Jazz in exchange for Deron Williams. He went on to score a season-high 17 points on April 9 against San Antonio.

On October 19, 2013, Favors signed a four-year contract extension with the Jazz.

On November 1, 2014, Favors scored a then career-high 32 points in a 118–91 win over the Phoenix Suns. On November 12, 2015, he recorded 25 points, 12 rebounds and a career-high 7 blocks in a loss to the Miami Heat. On December 5, 2015, he scored a career-high 35 points in a 122–119 overtime win over the Indiana Pacers. On January 25, 2016, Favors returned to the floor after a 16-game absence due to a back problem. He played 19 minutes off the bench and recorded 14 points and 5 rebounds in a loss to the Detroit Pistons.

On March 13, 2018, in a 110–79 win over the Detroit Pistons, Favors climbed to 10th place on Utah's all-time rebounding list with 3,602 rebounds. He passed former Utah center Mehmet Okur, who pulled down 3,599 rebounds with the Jazz. On April 11, 2018, in a 102–93 win over the Portland Trail Blazers, Favors played in his 500th game with the Jazz, becoming the 12th player in franchise history to reach the milestone. In Game 2 of the Jazz's first-round playoff series against the Oklahoma City Thunder, Favors had career playoff bests of 20 points and 16 rebounds in a 102–95 win.

On July 6, 2018, Favors re-signed with the Jazz. On January 11, 2019, he had a then season-high 13 rebounds in a 113–95 win over the Los Angeles Lakers, thus passing Greg Ostertag (3,978) for fourth place on the franchise's all-time rebounding list. On March 2, 2019, he had 23 points and tied a career best with 18 rebounds in a 115–111 win over the Milwaukee Bucks.

=== New Orleans Pelicans (2019–2020) ===
On July 7, 2019, Favors was traded to the New Orleans Pelicans in exchange for two future second-round picks. He made his Pelicans debut on October 22, recording six points, seven rebounds and two assists in a 130–122 overtime loss to the Toronto Raptors. On November 14, Favors grabbed a career-high twenty rebounds, alongside twenty points and three assists, in a 132–127 win over the Los Angeles Clippers. It was Favors' first game with twenty points and twenty rebounds in his career. On January 18, 2020, he scored a season-high 22 points, alongside eleven rebounds and three assists, in a 133–130 loss to the Clippers.

=== Return to Utah (2020–2021) ===
On November 25, 2020, Favors signed a three-year, $27 million contract that reunited him with the Utah Jazz in free agency. On December 23, he made his season debut for the Jazz, recording ten points, seven rebounds and three assists in a 120–100 win over the Portland Trail Blazers. On January 1, 2021, Favors scored a season-high 14 points, alongside eleven rebounds and two assists, in a 106–100 win over the Los Angeles Clippers. On January 10, he grabbed a season-high 14 rebounds, alongside six points, in a 96–86 win over the Detroit Pistons. On April 8, Favors moved into tenth place on the Jazz's all-time scoring list, passing Mehmet Okur with 7,257 points. During the first round of the playoffs, the Jazz faced the Memphis Grizzlies. On May 23, Favors played in his first playoff game since 2019, recording twelve points, eleven rebounds and four blocks in a 112–109 Game 1 loss. The Jazz eventually won the series in five games, but were eliminated in a six-game series by the Los Angeles Clippers during the second round.

=== Oklahoma City Thunder (2021–2022) ===
On July 30, 2021, Favors was traded, alongside a future first-round pick, to the Oklahoma City Thunder in exchange for a 2027 second-round pick and cash considerations. He made his Thunder debut on October 20, recording four points and nine rebounds in a 107–86 loss to the Utah Jazz. On November 4, Favors grabbed a season-high twelve rebounds, alongside ten points, in a 107–104 win over the Los Angeles Lakers. On February 11, 2022, he scored a season-high 16 points, alongside nine rebounds and three blocks, in a 100–87 loss to the Philadelphia 76ers. On March 31, Favors was ruled out for the remainder of the season with lower back soreness.

On September 30, 2022, Favors was traded, alongside Ty Jerome, Maurice Harkless, Théo Maledon and a future second-round pick, to the Houston Rockets in exchange for David Nwaba, Sterling Brown, Trey Burke, and Marquese Chriss. On October 17, Favors was waived by the Rockets.

On January 11, 2023, Favors signed a 10-day contract with his hometown team the Atlanta Hawks but saw no playing time.

=== Windy City Bulls (2023–2024) ===
On October 16, Favors signed with the Chicago Bulls, but was waived two days later. On November 2, he joined the Windy City Bulls.

== Career statistics ==
Legend
GP	Games played	GS	Games started	MPG	Minutes per game
FG%	Field goal percentage	3P%	3-point field goal percentage	FT%	Free throw percentage
RPG	Rebounds per game	APG	Assists per game	SPG	Steals per game
BPG	Blocks per game	PPG	Points per game	**Bold**	Career high

=== NBA ===
==== Regular season ====
Year	Team	GP	GS	MPG	FG%	3P%	FT%	RPG	APG	SPG	BPG	PPG
2010–11	New Jersey	56	23	19.5	.511	—	.612	5.3	.4	.3	.7	6.3
2010–11	Utah	22	4	20.2	.529	—	.561	5.2	.8	.5	1.2	8.2
2011–12	Utah	65	9	21.2	.499	—	.649	6.5	.7	.6	1.0	8.8
2012–13	Utah	**77**	8	23.2	.482	.000	.688	7.1	1.0	.9	**1.7**	9.4
2013–14	Utah	73	73	30.2	.522	.000	.669	8.7	1.2	1.0	1.5	13.3
2014–15	Utah	74	74	30.8	.525	.167	.669	8.2	1.5	.8	**1.7**	16.0
2015–16	Utah	62	59	**32.0**	.515	.000	.709	8.1	1.5	**1.2**	1.5	**16.4**
2016–17	Utah	50	39	23.7	.487	**.300**	.615	6.1	1.1	.9	.8	9.5
2017–18	Utah	**77**	**77**	28.0	.563	.222	.651	7.2	1.3	.7	1.1	12.3
2018–19	Utah	76	70	23.2	.586	.218	.675	7.4	1.2	.7	1.4	11.8
2019–20	New Orleans	51	49	24.4	.617	.143	.563	**9.8**	**1.6**	.6	.9	9.0
2020–21	Utah	68	0	15.3	**.638**	.000	**.738**	5.5	.6	.5	1.0	5.4
2021–22	Oklahoma City	39	18	16.7	.516	.125	.640	4.7	.6	.4	.3	5.3
Career		790	503	24.3	.534	.198	.663	7.1	1.1	.7	1.2	10.6

==== Playoffs ====
Year	Team	GP	GS	MPG	FG%	3P%	FT%	RPG	APG	SPG	BPG	PPG
2012	Utah	4	1	**29.0**	.417	—	.586	**9.5**	.5	**1.3**	1.5	**11.8**
2017	Utah	**11**	2	20.5	.581	—	.478	5.5	.9	.7	.5	7.5
2018	Utah	**11**	**9**	26.0	.618	**.400**	.485	5.2	**1.2**	.7	1.0	9.3
2019	Utah	5	2	20.6	.639	.000	**.684**	7.4	.8	.8	**1.8**	**11.8**
2021	Utah	**11**	0	13.2	**.696**	—	.556	4.2	.3	.2	.9	3.4
Career		42	14	20.8	.587	.250	.549	5.7	.8	.6	1.0	7.8

=== College ===
Year	Team	GP	GS	MPG	FG%	3P%	FT%	RPG	APG	SPG	BPG	PPG
2009–10	Georgia Tech	36	35	27.5	.611	.000	.629	8.4	1.0	.9	2.1	12.4

== Endorsements ==
Favors signed a shoe deal with Adidas just before the 2010 NBA Draft. Favors has been loyal to Adidas since he was 15, when he was playing for his AAU team, the Atlanta Celtics.
