= Johnnie Bryant =

American basketball coach

Cleveland Cavaliers
- Title: Associate head coach
- League: NBA

Personal information
- Born: August 6, 1985 (age 41) Oakland, California, U.S.
- Listed height: 6 ft 0 in (1.83 m)
- Listed weight: 180 lb (82 kg)

Career information
- High school: Bishop O'Dowd (Oakland, California)
- College: CC of San Francisco (2003–2004); Utah (2004–2007)
- NBA draft: 2007: undrafted
- Position: Point guard
- Number: 1
- Coaching career: 2012–present

Career history

Coaching
- 2014–2020: Utah Jazz (assistant)
- 2020–2024: New York Knicks (associate HC)
- 2024–present: Cleveland Cavaliers (associate HC)

Johnnie Bryant (born August 6, 1985) is an American professional basketball coach who serves as associate head coach for the Cleveland Cavaliers of the National Basketball Association (NBA). He played college basketball for the Utah Utes.

== Playing career ==
Bryant played the 2003–04 season at San Francisco City College. During the 2004–05 season he transferred to the University of Utah, where he redshirted the remainder of the season. As a sophomore, Bryant earned honorable mention All-Mountain West Conference, appearing in all 29 games. As a junior, Bryant also earned honorable mention All-Mountain West Conference, averaging 15.1 points per game.

Bryant holds the University of Utah's career three-point percentage record (.440).

== Coaching career ==
Bryant started coaching at the Bryant Sports Academy, a skill development program through which he worked with athletes of all ages, including former Utah Jazz forward Paul Millsap and Milwaukee Bucks guard Damian Lillard.

On September 25, 2012, Bryant was hired by the Utah Jazz as a player development assistant. On June 24, 2014, he was promoted to assistant coach under head coach Quin Snyder.

On September 4, 2020, Bryant was named the associate head coach of the New York Knicks.

In July 2024, Bryant was hired by the Cleveland Cavaliers as associate head coach.
