= Bessemer =

Bessemer may refer to:

== Places ==
=== Canada ===
- Bessemer, Ontario

=== United States ===
- Bessemer, Alabama
  - Bessemer Airport
  - Bessemer Civic Center
- Bessemer, Colorado
- Bessemer, Michigan
- Bessemer City, North Carolina
- Bessemer, Ohio
- Bessemer, Pennsylvania (disambiguation), multiple locations
- Bessemer Mountain, a summit in Washington state
- Bessemer Township, Michigan
- A fictitious town in Upstate New York in David Stout's novel The Night of the Ice Storm

== Other uses ==
- Bessemer Venture Partners, an American venture capital and private equity firm
- The Bessemer process, the first inexpensive industrial production method for steel
- Bessemer (surname)
- SS Bessemer, a Victorian experimental paddle steamer
- Bessemer, a GWR 3031 Class locomotive
