= Bazemore =

Bazemore may refer to

- Bazemore, Alabama, a small community in the United States
- Bazemore–Hyder Stadium in Georgia, U.S.
- King-Casper-Ward-Bazemore House in North Carolina, U.S.
- Bazemore (surname)
