= Bessemer, Pennsylvania =

Bessemer, Pennsylvania may refer to:

- Bessemer, North Braddock, Allegheny County, Pennsylvania
- Bessemer, Lawrence County, Pennsylvania
- Bessemer, Westmoreland County, Pennsylvania
