= Bazemore (surname) =

Bazemore is a surname originating from the German Bessemer, an occupational surname for a broom maker (besem meaning broom in Middle High German). It may refer to the following notable people:

- Debra Bazemore (born 1957), American politician
- Ernestine Bazemore (died 2025), American politician
- Kent Bazemore (born 1989), American basketball player

== See also ==
- Bessemer (surname)
