= Kelford, North Carolina =

- Town
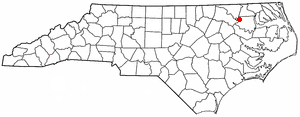
- Location of Kelford, North Carolina
- Coordinates: 36°10′52″N 77°13′27″W
- Country: United States
- State: North Carolina
- County: Bertie

Area
  - Total: 0.48 sq mi (1.25 km^{2})
  - Land: 0.48 sq mi (1.25 km^{2})
  - Water: 0 sq mi (0.00 km^{2})
- Elevation: 92 ft (28 m)

Population (2020)
  - Total: 203
  - Density: 421.0/sq mi (162.53/km^{2})
- Time zone: UTC-5 (Eastern (EST))
  - Summer (DST): UTC-4 (EDT)
- ZIP code: 27847
- Area code: 252
- FIPS code: 37-35360
- GNIS feature ID: 2405932
- Website: https://townofkelfordnc.gov/

Kelford is a town in Bertie County, North Carolina, United States. As of the 2020 census, Kelford had a population of 203.

== Geography ==
According to the United States Census Bureau, the town has a total area of 0.46 square miles (1.2 km^{2}), all land.

== Demographics ==
Historical population
Census	Pop.	Note	%±
1900	167		—
1910	316		89.2%
1920	223		−29.4%
1930	458		105.4%
1940	456		−0.4%
1950	405		−11.2%
1960	362		−10.6%
1970	295		−18.5%
1980	254		−13.9%
1990	204		−19.7%
2000	245		20.1%
2010	251		2.4%
2020	203		−19.1%
U.S. Decennial Census

=== Racial and ethnic composition ===
Kelford town, North Carolina – Racial and ethnic composition Note: the US Census treats Hispanic/Latino as an ethnic category. This table excludes Latinos from the racial categories and assigns them to a separate category. Hispanics/Latinos may be of any race.
Race / Ethnicity (NH = Non-Hispanic)	Pop 2000	Pop 2010	Pop 2020	% 2000	% 2010	% 2020
White alone (NH)	80	58	45	32.65%	23.11%	22.17%
Black or African American alone (NH)	160	190	143	65.31%	75.70%	70.44%
Native American or Alaska Native alone (NH)	0	0	3	0.00%	0.00%	1.48%
Asian alone (NH)	0	0	0	0.00%	0.00%	0.00%
Native Hawaiian or Pacific Islander alone (NH)	0	0	0	0.00%	0.00%	0.00%
Other race alone (NH)	0	0	1	0.00%	0.00%	0.49%
Mixed race or Multiracial (NH)	5	3	3	2.04%	1.20%	1.48%
Hispanic or Latino (any race)	0	0	8	0.00%	0.00%	3.94%
Total	245	251	203	100.00%	100.00%	100.00%

=== 2000 census ===
As of the census of 2000, there were 245 people, 99 households, and 51 families residing in the town. The population density was 481.3 inhabitants per square mile (185.8/km^{2}). There were 116 housing units at an average density of 227.9 per square mile (88.0/km^{2}). The racial makeup of the town was 32.65% White, 65.31% African American, and 2.04% from two or more races.

There were 99 households, out of which 24.2% had children under the age of 18 living with them, 25.3% were married couples living together, 19.2% had a female householder with no husband present, and 47.5% were non-families. 44.4% of all households were made up of individuals, and 26.3% had someone living alone who was 65 years of age or older. The average household size was 2.47 and the average family size was 3.69.

In the town, the population was spread out, with 29.8% under the age of 18, 9.4% from 18 to 24, 20.0% from 25 to 44, 24.9% from 45 to 64, and 15.9% who were 65 years of age or older. The median age was 38 years. For every 100 females, there were 87.0 males. For every 100 females age 18 and over, there were 75.5 males.

The median income for a household in the town was $21,750, and the median income for a family was $29,375. Males had a median income of $22,000 versus $20,972 for females. The per capita income for the town was $9,945. About 22.6% of families and 27.5% of the population were below the poverty line, including 32.9% of those under the age of eighteen and 44.7% of those 65 or over.

== Education ==
- West Bertie Elementary School

== Notable people ==
- Kent Bazemore, NBA player for the Sacramento Kings
- Jessica Breland, WNBA player for the Chicago Sky
