= Bessemer, Westmoreland County, Pennsylvania =

Unincorporated community in Pennsylvania, US

Bessemer
- Unincorporated community
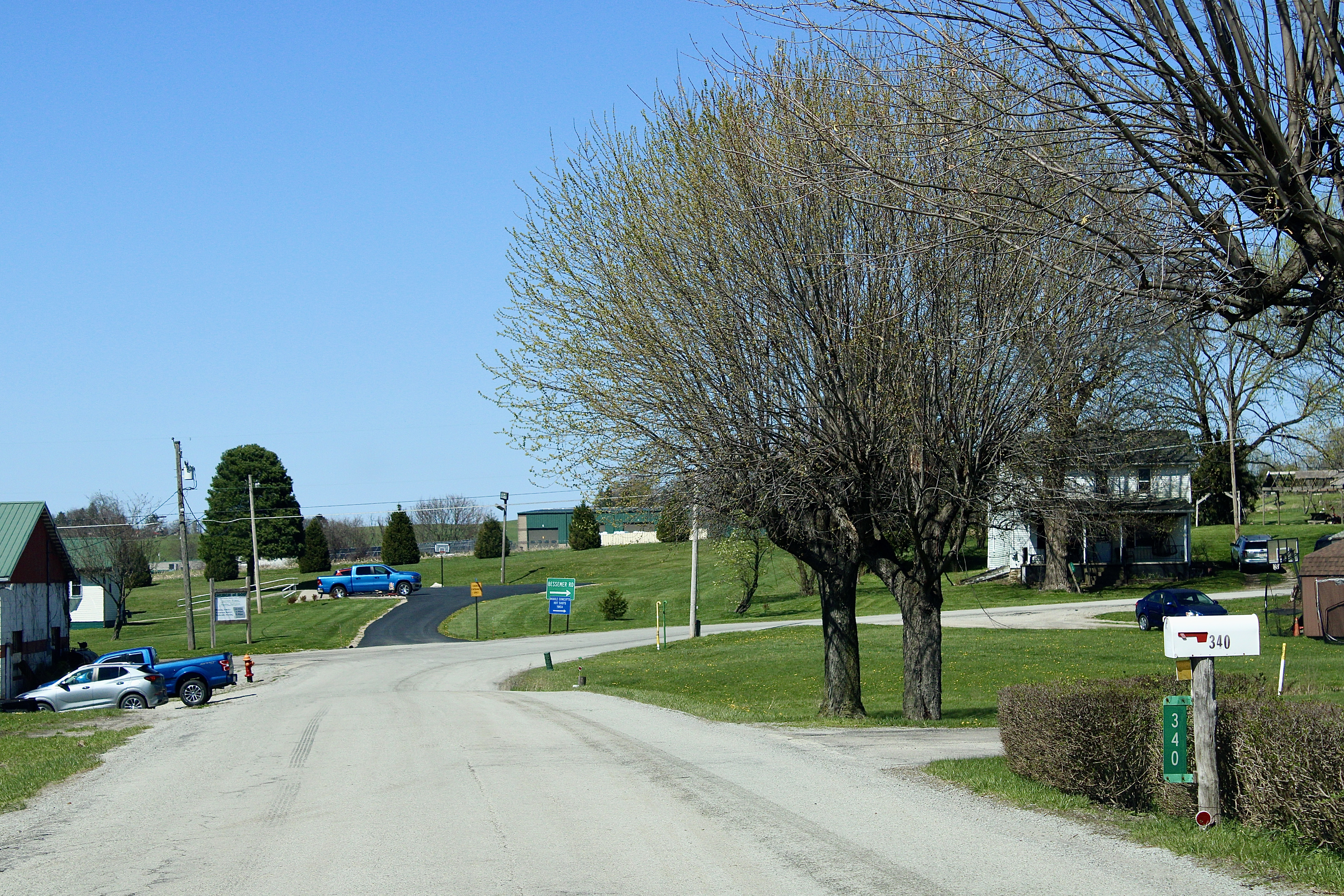
- Bessemer road in 2026
- Interactive map of Bessemer
- Coordinates: 40.1281278°N 79.5550387°W
- Country: United States
- State: Pennsylvania
- County: Westmoreland
- Borough: Mount Pleasant

Bessemer is a populated place in Westmoreland County, Pennsylvania, United States at coordinates 40.1281278,-79.5550387 within Mount Pleasant. A road named Bessemer Road is located near the coordinates for the populated place listed in the Geographic Names Information System database.

== History ==
The community of Bessemer can be traced back to the late 20th century. The area was established primarily as a throughway for transport following the collapse of a mine on Scottdale-Mount Pleasant road (now a portion of State Route 819), which resulted in a 75 foot road closure throughout East Huntingdon.

The general area of Bessemer is presently East Huntingdon, with the highway being the primary source of the community’s economy and traffic. Up until the 1940s, much of the area surrounding Bessemer was mostly farm land before the establishment of businesses that operated along 819 and 119.

Bessemer Road became the home of several businesses including the former Swing-N-Hit driving range (which closed in 2012 and is now home to a fireworks store) as well as the Mount Pleasant YMCA club. Nearby, there is also a veterinary clinic and an Old Country Store. There is also a non denominational Christian church called the Bessemer Church of God. In 2005, a Holiday Inn hotel opened on Bessemer Road.

== See also ==
- Bessemer
