= 2017–18 Cleveland Cavaliers season =

NBA professional basketball team season

- Conference champions
- Division champions
- Head coach: Tyronn Lue; Larry Drew (interim)
- General manager: Koby Altman
- Owner: Dan Gilbert
- Arena: Quicken Loans Arena

Results
- Record: 50–32 (.610)
- Place: Division: 1st (Central); Conference: 4th (Eastern)
- Playoff finish: NBA Finals (lost to Warriors 0–4)
- Stats at Basketball Reference

Local media
- Television: Fox Sports Ohio
- Radio: WTAM; WMMS

The 2017–18 Cleveland Cavaliers season was the 48th season of the franchise in the National Basketball Association (NBA). The Cavaliers entered the season as runners-up in the 2017 NBA Finals, where they lost to the Golden State Warriors in four games. This was the Cavaliers' first season without Kyrie Irving since the 2010–2011 season, as he was traded to the Boston Celtics during the offseason per his request. This trade ended the superteam era of the Cavaliers. Additionally, this was the Cavaliers’s last season with LeBron James, as he would leave the team as a free agent at the end of the season to join the Los Angeles Lakers.

The Cavaliers clinched their playoff berth for the fourth consecutive season since LeBron James' return to Cleveland for the 2014–15 season. In the playoffs, the Cavaliers defeated the Indiana Pacers in seven games in the First Round, then swept the top-seeded Toronto Raptors in four games in the Semi-finals, before finally defeating the Boston Celtics in seven games in the conference finals. Cleveland reached the NBA Finals for the fourth straight season, despite having an injury filled roster throughout the span of the 2017–2018 season, but were swept by the defending NBA champions Golden State Warriors in four games, the first Finals sweep that occurred since 2007, when the LeBron-led Cavs were also swept by the San Antonio Spurs. For the fourth consecutive year, the two teams met in the Finals, marking LeBron James' eighth consecutive appearance in the NBA Finals and his ninth overall appearance in the championship round. This season also marked the conclusion of James' second tenure with the Cavaliers, as he opted out of his contract during the subsequent offseason and again left the Cavaliers to sign with the Los Angeles Lakers, his second time leaving his hometown team after doing so in 2010 to join the Miami Heat.

With their loss in the Finals for the second consecutive year, the Cavaliers had become the first team since the 2002–03 New Jersey Nets to lose back-to-back Finals. The team did not return to the playoffs until the 2022–23 season.

== Offseason ==
On August 30, 2017, Kyrie Irving was traded to the Boston Celtics.

=== Draft ===
The Cavaliers did not have a pick in the 2017 NBA draft.

== Preseason summary ==
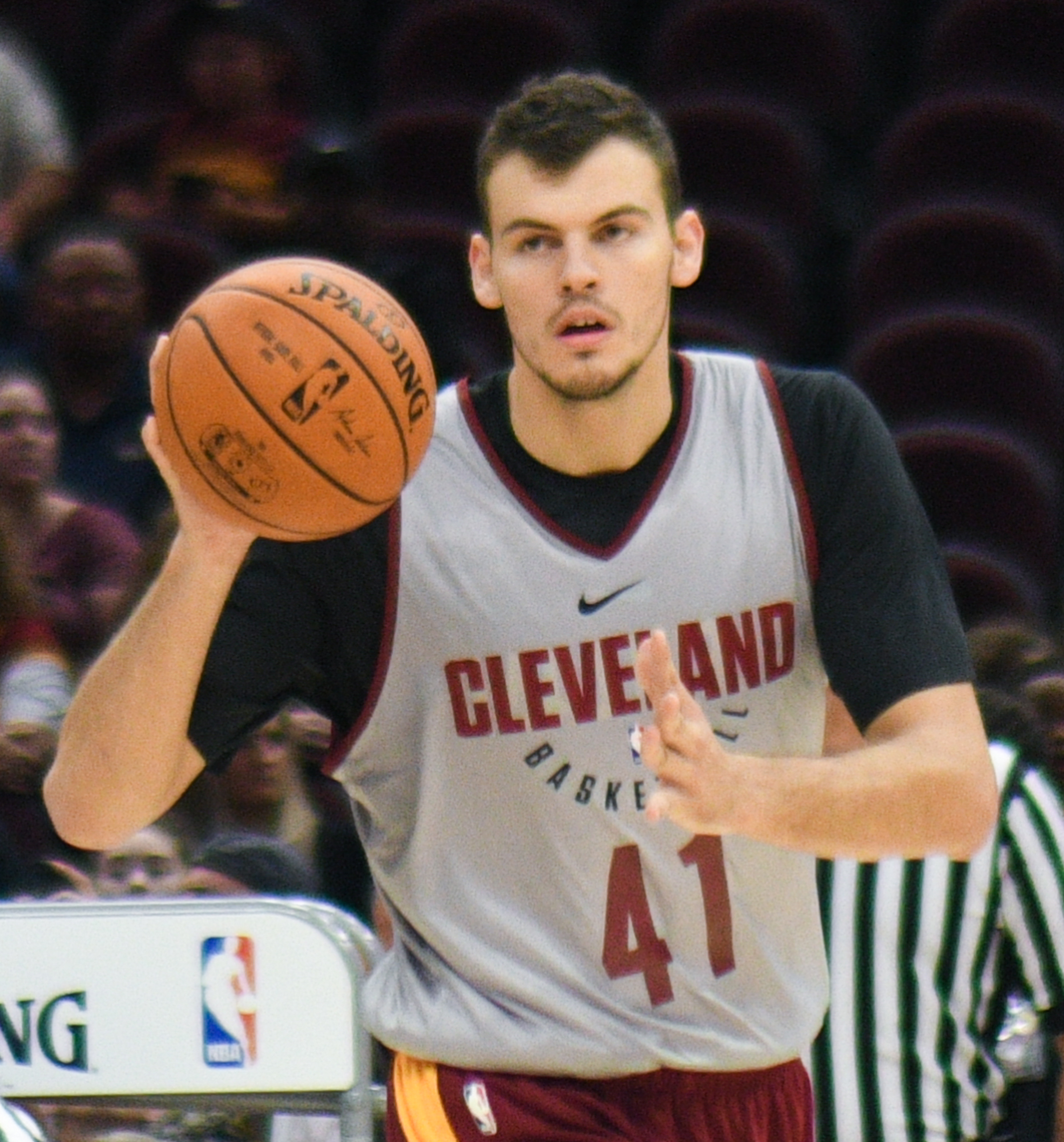
Ante Žižić with the Cavaliers in 2017

The Cavaliers entered the offseason having lost in five games to the Golden State Warriors in the 2017 NBA Finals. On June 19, 2017 – a week after the last game of the 2016–17 season – Cavaliers general manager David Griffin agreed to leave the team. During July, Cleveland competed in the MGM Resorts Summer League in Las Vegas.

During the middle of July, star point guard Kyrie Irving – citing serious concerns about the team's future and strains in his relationship with teammate LeBron James – informed the team of his desire to be traded out of Cleveland. Around that time, his list of teams he wanted to be traded to included the Miami Heat, Minnesota Timberwolves, New York Knicks, and San Antonio Spurs. While James was against the idea of trading his teammate and asked the team not to trade him, Irving reportedly threatened to have knee surgery and sit out regular season games if he wasn't traded. The Cavaliers hired their new general manager, Koby Altman, on July 24, 2017, amidst the chaos surrounding Irving.

On August 22, 2017, the Cavaliers announced they had traded Irving to the Boston Celtics in exchange for point guard Isaiah Thomas, small forward Jae Crowder, center Ante Žižić, and the first-round pick from the Brooklyn Nets in the 2018 NBA draft. However, the deal was not completed until eight days later, when the Celtics added the Miami Heat's 2020 second-round pick as compensation after Isaiah Thomas failed his physical. Prior to Irving's trade to the Celtics, he was almost traded to the Phoenix Suns in a 3-team deal that would send Irving and Channing Frye to Phoenix, Paul George and Eric Bledsoe to Cleveland, while the Indiana Pacers would acquire Jared Dudley, Iman Shumpert, and Josh Jackson, the Suns' top draft pick this season.

After considering signing with teams such as the Oklahoma City Thunder, Milwaukee Bucks, San Antonio Spurs, and Houston Rockets, shooting guard Dwyane Wade signed with the Cavaliers on September 27, 2017, thus reuniting with James from their time together on the Big Three-era Miami Heat. Additionally, the Golden State Warriors also pursued Wade prior to his signing with the Cavs. Finally, on October 14, 2017, the Cavaliers traded small forward Richard Jefferson, point guard Kay Felder, two-second-round picks (including the Miami Heat's 2020 second-round pick), and cash considerations to the Atlanta Hawks for the draft rights to Dimitrios Agravanis and Sergiy Gladyr.

== Regular season summary ==
The team played their first regular season game of the year on October 17, 2017, against the Boston Celtics, when Celtics small forward Gordon Hayward gruesomely injured his leg in the first quarter. The Cavaliers would go on to defeat the Celtics, 102–99.

On January 2, 2018, Thomas made his Cavaliers debut, scoring 17 points in 19 minutes played in a 127–110 win against the Portland Trail Blazers. Despite this auspicious start, Thomas and the team soon began to struggle, leading to locker room unrest, including a number of public criticisms of the team by Thomas. During Thomas' brief time playing for Cleveland, the Cavaliers amassed a record of 7–8.

On February 8, 2018 – just before the NBA trade deadline – the Cavaliers radically changed their roster in a little more than an hour. First, the Cavaliers traded Thomas, power forward Channing Frye, and their own first-round pick (which was top-three protected) to the Los Angeles Lakers for power forward Larry Nance Jr. and shooting guard Jordan Clarkson. Next, the Cavaliers engaged in a three-team trade with the Sacramento Kings and the Utah Jazz. The Cavaliers received point guard George Hill and shooting guard Rodney Hood. The Kings received Joe Johnson, Iman Shumpert, the Miami Heat's 2020 second-round pick, and $3 million in cash considerations. The Jazz received Crowder and Derrick Rose. Finally, the Cavaliers traded Wade to the Miami Heat for a heavily protected 2024 second-round pick. Multiple writers argued at the time that the trades made the Cavaliers significantly better.

On March 19, 2018, the team announced that head coach Tyronn Lue would be taking a leave of absence from the team due to health issues including "chest pains and other troubling symptoms, compounded by a loss of sleep." It would later be revealed that his situation involved job-related anxiety. In his absence, associate head coach Larry Drew coached the team.

The Cavaliers clinched a place in the 2018 NBA playoffs on March 22, 2018, with the Houston Rockets' 100–96 victory over the Detroit Pistons. Lue returned to coach the Cavaliers on April 5, 2018, in a 119–115 victory over the Washington Wizards.

The Cavaliers finished the regular season with a record of 50–32, good for a fourth-place finish in the Eastern Conference.

== Postseason summary ==
In the first round of the playoffs, the fourth seeded Cavaliers faced the fifth-seeded Indiana Pacers. A year before, the Cavaliers had swept the Pacers in the first round. This time around, the Cavaliers won the series in seven games. In Game 7, James put up 45 points, nine rebounds, and seven assists in a 105–101 win.

The Cavaliers advanced to face the top-seeded Toronto Raptors, the same team that they defeated in the 2017 Eastern Conference semi-finals. Cleveland swept Toronto, leading to an Eastern Conference finals matchup against the second-seeded Boston Celtics for the second consecutive year.

After losing in the first two games of the series, the Cavaliers battled back to tie the series at 2–2. The Celtics won Game 5 and the Cavaliers won Game 6, setting up a pivotal Game 7 at the TD Garden. Despite playing without Kevin Love – who suffered a concussion during Game 6 that prevented him from playing in the final game of the series – the Cavaliers won Game 7, 87–79, to win the conference finals and advance to the NBA Finals for the fourth consecutive season. Additionally, James made the NBA Finals for the eighth straight season.

=== 2018 NBA Finals ===
For the fourth straight year, the Cavaliers played the Golden State Warriors in the NBA Finals. The Cavaliers and the Warriors became the first teams to make the finals for the fourth consecutive season since the 1984–85 Los Angeles Lakers. The Warriors entered the series as heavy favorites.

==== Game 1 ====
The fourth quarter of Game 1 ended in controversial fashion. With the Cavaliers up 104–102 at Oracle Arena, Golden State small forward Kevin Durant was called for a charging foul when driving against LeBron James. When the referees reviewed the play to confirm that James' feet were outside of the restricted area, they opted to invoke a little-known rule and reverse the charge call into a blocking foul. Durant made both free throws to equal the score at 104. After a James layup and an and-one by Warriors point guard Stephen Curry, the Cavaliers had the ball down 107–106 with 23.5 seconds remaining in regulation.

During the ensuing possession, Golden State shooting guard Klay Thompson fouled George Hill with 4.7 seconds left, sending Hill to the free-throw line. The NBA's "Last Two Minute Report" later confirmed that Warriors forward Draymond Green had fouled James with 12.1 seconds to go in the game. If Green's foul had been noticed in real time, James – who shot 10-for-11 from the line in Game 1 – would have taken the free throws, rather than Hill. Hill tied the game at 107 by making his first free throw, then missed the second attempt. The L2M Report revealed that Green committed a lane violation on the second free throw. If it had been called in real time, Hill would have been able to retake the free throw.

Cavaliers shooting guard J. R. Smith recovered the rebound and then dribbled out the clock, appearing to have forgotten the score as well as the fact that Cleveland still had one timeout to call. The Warriors easily won the game in overtime, 124–114, leading numerous commentators – including current and former players – to accuse Smith of having cost the Cavaliers the game, as well as having wasted James' performance of 51 points, eight rebounds, and eight assists. Smith later claimed that he knew the game was tied, an assertion belied by the visual evidence as well as the testimony of Tyronn Lue.

After the game, James punched a blackboard with his right hand in an expression of his frustration with the team's level of play. The impact of the punch allegedly broke his hand. James played through the injury for the rest of the series without revealing it to the media or the general public, and news of the event did not emerge until after the series had ended.

==== Game 2 ====
Golden State beat Cleveland handily in Game 2, 122–103. Playing through an eye injury that he suffered during Game 1, James posted 29 points, nine rebounds, and 13 assists.

==== Game 3 ====
In Game 3 at Quicken Loans Arena, the Cavaliers raced out to an early 14–4 advantage and led for the entire first half, but the Warriors trimmed the host's lead to six by halftime. Stephen Curry and Klay Thompson struggled for most of the contest: each of the Splash Brothers only scored 11 points, with Curry in particular shooting just 3-of-16 from the field. Nevertheless, the Warriors claimed a 110–102 victory, thanks in large part to Kevin Durant's 43 points and 13 rebounds. Durant sealed the victory with a long three-pointer with 49.8 seconds left to extend the Warriors' lead to six.

==== Game 4 ====
Golden State held a nine-point lead at halftime, 61–52. The Warriors – as they had throughout the season – built their lead further in the third quarter and entered the last period of play with an 86–65 advantage. LeBron James departed the game with 4:03 left in the fourth quarter, with small forward Cedi Osman replacing him. James received a standing ovation from the crowd. His final stat line included 23 points, seven rebounds, and eight assists. Over the course of the series, James averaged 34 points, 8.5 rebounds, and 10 assists.

With their 108–85 victory, the Warriors sealed their sweep of the Cavaliers and their third championship in four seasons. Kevin Durant received the Bill Russell NBA Finals Most Valuable Player Award for the second consecutive year. James' record in NBA Finals series fell to 3–6. The Cavaliers became the ninth team to be swept in the NBA Finals. Incidentally, the last team to suffer that fate was also the Cavaliers, when they lost to the San Antonio Spurs in four games in the 2007 NBA Finals.

== Roster ==
2017–18 Cleveland Cavaliers roster
Players

| Pos. | No. | Player | Height | Weight | DOB | From |
|---|---|---|---|---|---|---|
| PG | 81 | José Calderón | 6 ft 3 in (1.91 m) | 200 lb (91 kg) | 1981–09–28 | Spain |
| SG | 8 | Jordan Clarkson | 6 ft 5 in (1.96 m) | 194 lb (88 kg) | 1992–06–07 | Missouri |
| PF | 32 | Jeff Green | 6 ft 9 in (2.06 m) | 235 lb (107 kg) | 1986–08–28 | Georgetown |
| PG | 3 | George Hill | 6 ft 3 in (1.91 m) | 188 lb (85 kg) | 1986–05–04 | IUPUI |
| SG | 10 | John Holland (TW) | 6 ft 5 in (1.96 m) | 205 lb (93 kg) | 1988–11–06 | Boston University |
| SF | 1 | Rodney Hood | 6 ft 8 in (2.03 m) | 206 lb (93 kg) | 1992–10–20 | Duke |
| SF | 23 | LeBron James | 6 ft 8 in (2.03 m) | 250 lb (113 kg) | 1984–12–30 | St. Vincent–St. Mary HS (OH) |
| SG | 26 | Kyle Korver | 6 ft 7 in (2.01 m) | 212 lb (96 kg) | 1981–03–17 | Creighton |
| PF | 0 | Kevin Love | 6 ft 10 in (2.08 m) | 251 lb (114 kg) | 1988–09–07 | UCLA |
| PF | 22 | Larry Nance Jr. | 6 ft 10 in (2.08 m) | 230 lb (104 kg) | 1993–01–01 | Wyoming |
| SF | 16 | Cedi Osman | 6 ft 8 in (2.03 m) | 230 lb (104 kg) | 1995–04–08 | Turkey |
| C | 21 | Kendrick Perkins | 6 ft 10 in (2.08 m) | 270 lb (122 kg) | 1984–11–10 | Clifton J. Ozen HS (TX) |
| SG | 15 | London Perrantes (TW) | 6 ft 2 in (1.88 m) | 190 lb (86 kg) | 1994–10–03 | Virginia |
| SG | 5 | J. R. Smith | 6 ft 6 in (1.98 m) | 225 lb (102 kg) | 1985–09–09 | Saint Benedict's Prep (NJ) |
| C | 13 | Tristan Thompson | 6 ft 10 in (2.08 m) | 254 lb (115 kg) | 1991–03–13 | Texas |
| C | 41 | Ante Žižić | 6 ft 11 in (2.11 m) | 266 lb (121 kg) | 1997–01–04 | Croatia |

Coaches
Head coach
- Tyronn Lue
Assistant(s)
- Larry Drew (Assoc. HC)
- Jim Boylan
- Phil Handy
- Damon Jones
- Mike Longabardi
- James Posey
- Vitaly Potapenko

Legend
- (DP) Unsigned draft pick
- (FA) Free agent
- (S) Suspended
- (GL) On assignment to G League affiliate
- (TW) Two-way affiliate player
- Injured

Roster
Updated: 2018–04–11

== Standings ==
=== Division ===
| Central Division | W | L | PCT | GB | Home | Road | Div | GP |
|---|---|---|---|---|---|---|---|---|
| y – Cleveland Cavaliers | 50 | 32 | .610 | – | 29‍–‍12 | 21‍–‍20 | 11–5 | 82 |
| x – Indiana Pacers | 48 | 34 | .585 | 2.0 | 27‍–‍14 | 21‍–‍20 | 10–6 | 82 |
| x – Milwaukee Bucks | 44 | 38 | .537 | 6.0 | 25‍–‍16 | 19‍–‍22 | 6–10 | 82 |
| Detroit Pistons | 39 | 43 | .476 | 11.0 | 25‍–‍16 | 14‍–‍27 | 9–7 | 82 |
| Chicago Bulls | 27 | 55 | .329 | 23.0 | 17‍–‍24 | 10‍–‍31 | 4–12 | 82 |

=== Conference ===
Eastern Conference
| # | Team | W | L | PCT | GB | GP |
|---|---|---|---|---|---|---|
| 1 | c – Toronto Raptors * | 59 | 23 | .720 | – | 82 |
| 2 | x – Boston Celtics | 55 | 27 | .671 | 4.0 | 82 |
| 3 | x – Philadelphia 76ers | 52 | 30 | .634 | 7.0 | 82 |
| 4 | y – Cleveland Cavaliers * | 50 | 32 | .610 | 9.0 | 82 |
| 5 | x – Indiana Pacers | 48 | 34 | .585 | 11.0 | 82 |
| 6 | y – Miami Heat * | 44 | 38 | .537 | 15.0 | 82 |
| 7 | x – Milwaukee Bucks | 44 | 38 | .537 | 15.0 | 82 |
| 8 | x – Washington Wizards | 43 | 39 | .524 | 16.0 | 82 |
| 9 | Detroit Pistons | 39 | 43 | .476 | 20.0 | 82 |
| 10 | Charlotte Hornets | 36 | 46 | .439 | 23.0 | 82 |
| 11 | New York Knicks | 29 | 53 | .354 | 30.0 | 82 |
| 12 | Brooklyn Nets | 28 | 54 | .341 | 31.0 | 82 |
| 13 | Chicago Bulls | 27 | 55 | .329 | 32.0 | 82 |
| 14 | Orlando Magic | 25 | 57 | .305 | 34.0 | 82 |
| 15 | Atlanta Hawks | 24 | 58 | .293 | 35.0 | 82 |

== Game log ==
=== Preseason ===
2017 pre-season game log
Total: 1–4 (home: 0–3; road: 1–1)
Pre-season: 1–4 (home: 0–3; road: 1–1)

| Game | Date | Team | Score | High points | High rebounds | High assists | Location Attendance | Record |
|---|---|---|---|---|---|---|---|---|
| 1 | October 4 | Atlanta | L 93–109 | Kay Felder (13) | Ante Zizic (6) | Dwyane Wade (4) | Quicken Loans Arena; 18,221 | 0–1 |
| 2 | October 6 | Indiana | L 102–106 | Dwyane Wade (20) | Tristan Thompson (8) | Calderon, Love (5) | Quicken Loans Arena; 19,432 | 0–2 |
| 3 | October 8 | @ Washington | L 94–102 | Jeff Green (19) | Green, Zizic (7) | Kay Felder (11) | Capital One Arena; 12,984 | 0–3 |
| 4 | October 10 | Chicago | L 94–108 | LeBron James (17) | Tristan Thompson (11) | Derrick Rose (5) | Quicken Loans Arena; 19,042 | 0–4 |
| 5 | October 13 | @ Orlando | W 113–106 | Jose Calderon (18) | Channing Frye (10) | Jose Calderon (5) | Amway Center; 19,053 | 1–4 |

2017–18 season schedule

=== Regular season ===
2017–18 game log
Total: 50–32 (home: 29–12; road: 21–20)
October: 3–4 (home: 2–2; road: 1–2)

| Game | Date | Team | Score | High points | High rebounds | High assists | Location Attendance | Record |
|---|---|---|---|---|---|---|---|---|
| 1 | October 17 | Boston | W 102–99 | LeBron James (29) | LeBron James (16) | LeBron James (9) | Quicken Loans Arena; 20,562 | 1–0 |
| 2 | October 20 | @ Milwaukee | W 116–97 | LeBron James (24) | Kevin Love (12) | LeBron James (8) | Bradley Center; 18,717 | 2–0 |
| 3 | October 21 | Orlando | L 93–114 | LeBron James (22) | Kevin Love (9) | Dwyane Wade (4) | Quicken Loans Arena; 20,562 | 2–1 |
| 4 | October 24 | Chicago | W 119–112 | LeBron James (34) | Kevin Love (12) | LeBron James (13) | Quicken Loans Arena; 20,562 | 3–1 |
| 5 | October 25 | @ Brooklyn | L 107–112 | LeBron James (29) | Kevin Love (12) | LeBron James (13) | Barclays Center; 17,732 | 3–2 |
| 6 | October 28 | @ New Orleans | L 101–123 | Kevin Love (26) | Kevin Love (11) | LeBron James (8) | Smoothie King Center; 18,539 | 3–3 |
| 7 | October 29 | New York | L 95–114 | Kevin Love (22) | Kevin Love (11) | LeBron James (7) | Quicken Loans Arena; 20,562 | 3–4 |

November: 12–3 (home: 5–2; road: 7–1)

| Game | Date | Team | Score | High points | High rebounds | High assists | Location Attendance | Record |
|---|---|---|---|---|---|---|---|---|
| 8 | November 1 | Indiana | L 107–124 | LeBron James (33) | Kevin Love (12) | LeBron James (11) | Quicken Loans Arena; 20,562 | 3–5 |
| 9 | November 3 | @ Washington | W 130–122 | LeBron James (57) | LeBron James (11) | LeBron James (7) | Capital One Arena; 20,356 | 4–5 |
| 10 | November 5 | Atlanta | L 115–117 | LeBron James (26) | Dwyane Wade (11) | LeBron James (13) | Quicken Loans Arena; 20,562 | 4–6 |
| 11 | November 7 | Milwaukee | W 124–119 | Kevin Love (32) | Kevin Love (16) | LeBron James (9) | Quicken Loans Arena; 20,562 | 5–6 |
| 12 | November 9 | @ Houston | L 113–117 | LeBron James (33) | Kevin Love (6) | LeBron James (7) | Toyota Center; 18,055 | 5–7 |
| 13 | November 11 | @ Dallas | W 111–104 | Kevin Love (29) | Kevin Love (15) | LeBron James (4) | American Airlines Center; 20,378 | 6–7 |
| 14 | November 13 | @ NY Knicks | W 104–101 | LeBron James (23) | LeBron James (9) | LeBron James (12) | Madison Square Garden; 19,812 | 7–7 |
| 15 | November 15 | @ Charlotte | W 115–107 | LeBron James (31) | Kevin Love (10) | LeBron James (8) | Spectrum Center; 19,427 | 8–7 |
| 16 | November 17 | L.A. Clippers | W 118–113 (OT) | LeBron James (39) | LeBron James (14) | LeBron James (6) | Quicken Loans Arena; 20,562 | 9–7 |
| 17 | November 20 | @ Detroit | W 116–88 | Kevin Love (19) | Kevin Love (11) | LeBron James (8) | Little Caesars Arena; 20,587 | 10–7 |
| 18 | November 22 | Brooklyn | W 119–109 | LeBron James (33) | Kevin Love (10) | James, Wade (5) | Quicken Loans Arena; 20,562 | 11–7 |
| 19 | November 24 | Charlotte | W 100–99 | LeBron James (27) | LeBron James (16) | LeBron James (13) | Quicken Loans Arena; 20,562 | 12–7 |
| 20 | November 27 | @ Philadelphia | W 113–91 | LeBron James (30) | LeBron James (13) | LeBron James (6) | Wells Fargo Center; 20,527 | 13–7 |
| 21 | November 28 | Miami | W 108–97 | Kevin Love (38) | LeBron James (12) | LeBron James (6) | Quicken Loans Arena; 20,562 | 14–7 |
| 22 | November 30 | @ Atlanta | W 121–114 | Kevin Love (25) | Kevin Love (16) | LeBron James (12) | Philips Arena; 16,379 | 15–7 |

December: 9–5 (home: 7–0; road: 2–5)

| Game | Date | Team | Score | High points | High rebounds | High assists | Location Attendance | Record |
|---|---|---|---|---|---|---|---|---|
| 23 | December 2 | Memphis | W 116–111 | LeBron James (34) | Kevin Love (11) | LeBron James (12) | Quicken Loans Arena; 20,562 | 16–7 |
| 24 | December 4 | @ Chicago | W 113–91 | Kevin Love (24) | Kevin Love (13) | LeBron James (6) | United Center; 21,323 | 17–7 |
| 25 | December 6 | Sacramento | W 101–95 | LeBron James (32) | Kevin Love (13) | LeBron James (9) | Quicken Loans Arena; 20,562 | 18–7 |
| 26 | December 8 | @ Indiana | L 102–106 | LeBron James (29) | LeBron James (10) | LeBron James (8) | Bankers Life Fieldhouse; 17,032 | 18–8 |
| 27 | December 9 | Philadelphia | W 105–98 | LeBron James (30) | LeBron James (13) | LeBron James (13) | Quicken Loans Arena; 20,562 | 19–8 |
| 28 | December 12 | Atlanta | W 123–114 | LeBron James (25) | Kevin Love (12) | LeBron James (17) | Quicken Loans Arena; 20,562 | 20–8 |
| 29 | December 14 | L.A. Lakers | W 121–112 | Kevin Love (28) | LeBron James (12) | LeBron James (12) | Quicken Loans Arena; 20,562 | 21–8 |
| 30 | December 16 | Utah | W 109–100 | LeBron James (29) | LeBron James (11) | LeBron James (10) | Quicken Loans Arena; 20,562 | 22–8 |
| 31 | December 17 | @ Washington | W 106–99 | Kevin Love (25) | LeBron James (12) | LeBron James (15) | Capital One Arena; 20,356 | 23–8 |
| 32 | December 19 | @ Milwaukee | L 116–119 | LeBron James (39) | Kevin Love (10) | LeBron James (7) | Bradley Center; 18,717 | 23–9 |
| 33 | December 21 | Chicago | W 115–112 | LeBron James (34) | Kevin Love (7) | LeBron James (9) | Quicken Loans Arena; 20,562 | 24–9 |
| 34 | December 25 | @ Golden State | L 92–99 | Kevin Love (31) | Kevin Love (18) | LeBron James (6) | Oracle Arena; 19,596 | 24–10 |
| 35 | December 27 | @ Sacramento | L 95–109 | Kevin Love (23) | LeBron James (10) | LeBron James (14) | Golden 1 Center; 17,583 | 24–11 |
| 36 | December 30 | @ Utah | L 101–104 | LeBron James (29) | Kevin Love (10) | LeBron James (6) | Vivint Smart Home Arena; 18,306 | 24–12 |

January: 6–8 (home: 5–2; road: 1–6)

| Game | Date | Team | Score | High points | High rebounds | High assists | Location Attendance | Record |
|---|---|---|---|---|---|---|---|---|
| 37 | January 2 | Portland | W 127–110 | LeBron James (24) | Tristan Thompson (8) | LeBron James (8) | Quicken Loans Arena; 20,562 | 25–12 |
| 38 | January 3 | @ Boston | L 88–102 | LeBron James (19) | Tristan Thompson (11) | LeBron James (6) | TD Garden; 18,624 | 25–13 |
| 39 | January 6 | @ Orlando | W 131–127 | LeBron James (33) | LeBron James (10) | LeBron James (9) | Amway Center; 18,997 | 26–13 |
| 40 | January 8 | @ Minnesota | L 99–127 | Jeff Green (22) | James, Thompson (8) | Dwyane Wade (6) | Target Center; 18,978 | 26–14 |
| 41 | January 11 | @ Toronto | L 99–133 | LeBron James (26) | Kevin Love (9) | Isaiah Thomas (3) | Air Canada Centre; 19,923 | 26–15 |
| 42 | January 12 | @ Indiana | L 95–97 | LeBron James (27) | Kevin Love (10) | LeBron James (11) | Bankers Life Fieldhouse; 17,923 | 26–16 |
| 43 | January 15 | Golden State | L 108–118 | LeBron James (32) | James, Thompson (8) | LeBron James (6) | Quicken Loans Arena; 20,562 | 26–17 |
| 44 | January 18 | Orlando | W 104–103 | Isaiah Thomas (21) | Kevin Love (11) | LeBron James (6) | Quicken Loans Arena; 20,562 | 27–17 |
| 45 | January 20 | Oklahoma City | L 124–148 | Isaiah Thomas (24) | Tristan Thompson (7) | LeBron James (7) | Quicken Loans Arena; 20,562 | 27–18 |
| 46 | January 23 | @ San Antonio | L 102–114 | LeBron James (28) | Kevin Love (11) | LeBron James (7) | AT&T Center; 18,418 | 27–19 |
| 47 | January 26 | Indiana | W 115–108 | LeBron James (26) | Kevin Love (13) | LeBron James (11) | Quicken Loans Arena; 20,562 | 28–19 |
| 48 | January 28 | Detroit | W 121–104 | LeBron James (25) | Kevin Love (11) | LeBron James (14) | Quicken Loans Arena; 20,562 | 29–19 |
| 49 | January 30 | @ Detroit | L 114–125 | LeBron James (21) | LeBron James (10) | LeBron James (7) | Little Caesars Arena; 18,508 | 29–20 |
| 50 | January 31 | Miami | W 91–89 | LeBron James (24) | LeBron James (11) | Isaiah Thomas (6) | Quicken Loans Arena; 20,562 | 30–20 |

February: 6–4 (home: 2–3; road: 4–1)

| Game | Date | Team | Score | High points | High rebounds | High assists | Location Attendance | Record |
|---|---|---|---|---|---|---|---|---|
| 51 | February 3 | Houston | L 88–120 | Thomas, Smith (12) | LeBron James (9) | LeBron James (9) | Quicken Loans Arena; 20,562 | 30–21 |
| 52 | February 6 | @ Orlando | L 98–116 | LeBron James (25) | LeBron James (10) | Isaiah Thomas (8) | Amway Center; 18,846 | 30–22 |
| 53 | February 7 | Minnesota | W 140–138 (OT) | LeBron James (37) | LeBron James (10) | LeBron James (15) | Quicken Loans Arena; 20,562 | 31–22 |
| 54 | February 9 | @ Atlanta | W 123–107 | Kyle Korver (30) | LeBron James (12) | LeBron James (17) | Philips Arena; 16,438 | 32–22 |
| 55 | February 11 | @ Boston | W 121–99 | LeBron James (24) | LeBron James (8) | LeBron James (10) | TD Garden; 18,624 | 33–22 |
| 56 | February 13 | @ Oklahoma City | W 120–112 | LeBron James (37) | Larry Nance Jr. (9) | LeBron James (8) | Chesapeake Energy Arena; 18,203 | 34–22 |
| 57 | February 22 | Washington | L 103–110 | LeBron James (32) | James, Thompson (9) | LeBron James (8) | Quicken Loans Arena; 20,562 | 34–23 |
| 58 | February 23 | @ Memphis | W 112–89 | Hill, James (18) | LeBron James (14) | LeBron James (11) | FedExForum; 18,119 | 35–23 |
| 59 | February 25 | San Antonio | L 94–110 | LeBron James (33) | James, Thompson (13) | LeBron James (9) | Quicken Loans Arena; 20,562 | 35–24 |
| 60 | February 27 | Brooklyn | W 129–123 | LeBron James (31) | Tristan Thompson (13) | LeBron James (11) | Quicken Loans Arena; 20,562 | 36–24 |

March: 10–6 (home: 5–2; road: 5–4)

| Game | Date | Team | Score | High points | High rebounds | High assists | Location Attendance | Record |
|---|---|---|---|---|---|---|---|---|
| 61 | March 1 | Philadelphia | L 97–108 | LeBron James (30) | Tristan Thompson (11) | LeBron James (8) | Quicken Loans Arena; 20,562 | 36–25 |
| 62 | March 3 | Denver | L 117–126 | LeBron James (25) | LeBron James (10) | LeBron James (15) | Quicken Loans Arena; 20,562 | 36–26 |
| 63 | March 5 | Detroit | W 112–90 | LeBron James (31) | Larry Nance Jr. (15) | LeBron James (7) | Quicken Loans Arena; 20,562 | 37–26 |
| 64 | March 7 | @ Denver | W 113–108 | LeBron James (39) | Larry Nance Jr. (13) | LeBron James (10) | Pepsi Center; 20,062 | 38–26 |
| 65 | March 9 | @ L.A. Clippers | L 102–116 | LeBron James (25) | Larry Nance Jr. (12) | LeBron James (6) | Staples Center; 19,130 | 38–27 |
| 66 | March 11 | @ L.A. Lakers | L 113–127 | LeBron James (24) | LeBron James (10) | LeBron James (7) | Staples Center; 18,997 | 38–28 |
| 67 | March 13 | @ Phoenix | W 129–107 | LeBron James (28) | LeBron James (13) | LeBron James (11) | Talking Stick Resort Arena; 18,055 | 39–28 |
| 68 | March 15 | @ Portland | L 105–113 | LeBron James (35) | LeBron James (14) | LeBron James (6) | Moda Center; 19,806 | 39–29 |
| 69 | March 17 | @ Chicago | W 114–109 | LeBron James (33) | LeBron James (12) | LeBron James (12) | United Center; 22,983 | 40–29 |
| 70 | March 19 | Milwaukee | W 124–117 | LeBron James (40) | LeBron James (12) | LeBron James (10) | Quicken Loans Arena; 20,562 | 41–29 |
| 71 | March 21 | Toronto | W 132–129 | LeBron James (35) | Kevin Love (12) | LeBron James (17) | Quicken Loans Arena; 20,562 | 42–29 |
| 72 | March 23 | Phoenix | W 120–95 | LeBron James (27) | Nance Jr., Thompson (10) | LeBron James (9) | Quicken Loans Arena; 20,562 | 43–29 |
| 73 | March 25 | @ Brooklyn | W 121–114 | LeBron James (37) | Kevin Love (15) | LeBron James (8) | Barclays Center; 17,732 | 44–29 |
| 74 | March 27 | @ Miami | L 79–98 | LeBron James (18) | Tristan Thompson (13) | LeBron James (7) | American Airlines Arena; 20,093 | 44–30 |
| 75 | March 28 | @ Charlotte | W 118–105 | LeBron James (41) | LeBron James (10) | LeBron James (8) | Spectrum Center; 19,474 | 45–30 |
| 76 | March 30 | New Orleans | W 107–102 | LeBron James (27) | Tristan Thompson (14) | LeBron James (11) | Quicken Loans Arena; 20,562 | 46–30 |

April: 4–2 (home: 3–1; road: 1–1)

| Game | Date | Team | Score | High points | High rebounds | High assists | Location Attendance | Record |
|---|---|---|---|---|---|---|---|---|
| 77 | April 1 | Dallas | W 98–87 | Clarkson, James (16) | James, Love (13) | LeBron James (12) | Quicken Loans Arena; 20,562 | 47–30 |
| 78 | April 3 | Toronto | W 112–106 | LeBron James (27) | Kevin Love (15) | LeBron James (6) | Quicken Loans Arena; 20,562 | 48–30 |
| 79 | April 5 | Washington | W 119–115 | LeBron James (33) | Larry Nance Jr. (10) | LeBron James (14) | Quicken Loans Arena; 20,562 | 49–30 |
| 80 | April 6 | @ Philadelphia | L 130–132 | LeBron James (44) | LeBron James (11) | LeBron James (11) | Wells Fargo Center; 20,769 | 49–31 |
| 81 | April 9 | @ NY Knicks | W 123–109 | Kevin Love (28) | J. R. Smith (7) | LeBron James (11) | Madison Square Garden; 19,449 | 50–31 |
| 82 | April 11 | NY Knicks | L 98–110 | Ante Zizic (20) | Tristan Thompson (9) | Cedi Osman (6) | Quicken Loans Arena; 20,562 | 50–32 |

2017–18 season schedule

=== Playoffs ===
2018 playoff game log
Total: 12–10 (home: 8–3; road: 4–7)
First Round: 4–3 (home: 3–1; road: 1–2)

| Game | Date | Team | Score | High points | High rebounds | High assists | Location Attendance | Record |
|---|---|---|---|---|---|---|---|---|
| 1 | April 15 | Indiana | L 80–98 | LeBron James (24) | Kevin Love (17) | LeBron James (12) | Quicken Loans Arena; 20,562 | 0–1 |
| 2 | April 18 | Indiana | W 100–97 | LeBron James (46) | LeBron James (12) | LeBron James (5) | Quicken Loans Arena; 20,562 | 1–1 |
| 3 | April 20 | @ Indiana | L 90–92 | LeBron James (28) | LeBron James (12) | LeBron James (8) | Bankers Life Fieldhouse; 17,923 | 1–2 |
| 4 | April 22 | @ Indiana | W 104–100 | LeBron James (32) | LeBron James (13) | LeBron James (7) | Bankers Life Fieldhouse; 17,923 | 2–2 |
| 5 | April 25 | Indiana | W 98–95 | LeBron James (44) | James, Love (10) | LeBron James (8) | Quicken Loans Arena; 20,562 | 3–2 |
| 6 | April 27 | @ Indiana | L 87–121 | LeBron James (22) | Kevin Love (7) | LeBron James (7) | Bankers Life Fieldhouse; 17,923 | 3–3 |
| 7 | April 29 | Indiana | W 105–101 | LeBron James (45) | Tristan Thompson (10) | LeBron James (7) | Quicken Loans Arena; 20,562 | 4–3 |

Conference Semifinals: 4–0 (home: 2–0; road: 2–0)

| Game | Date | Team | Score | High points | High rebounds | High assists | Location Attendance | Series |
|---|---|---|---|---|---|---|---|---|
| 1 | May 1 | @ Toronto | W 113–112 (OT) | LeBron James (26) | Kevin Love (13) | LeBron James (13) | Air Canada Centre; 19,954 | 1–0 |
| 2 | May 3 | @ Toronto | W 128–110 | LeBron James (43) | Kevin Love (11) | LeBron James (14) | Air Canada Centre; 20,127 | 2–0 |
| 3 | May 5 | Toronto | W 105–103 | LeBron James (38) | Kevin Love (16) | LeBron James (7) | Quicken Loans Arena; 20,562 | 3–0 |
| 4 | May 7 | Toronto | W 128–93 | LeBron James (29) | LeBron James (8) | LeBron James (11) | Quicken Loans Arena; 20,562 | 4–0 |

Conference Finals: 4–3 (home: 3–0; road: 1–3)

| Game | Date | Team | Score | High points | High rebounds | High assists | Location Attendance | Series |
|---|---|---|---|---|---|---|---|---|
| 1 | May 13 | @ Boston | L 83–108 | Kevin Love (17) | Tristan Thompson (11) | LeBron James (9) | TD Garden; 18,624 | 0–1 |
| 2 | May 15 | @ Boston | L 94–107 | LeBron James (42) | Kevin Love (15) | LeBron James (12) | TD Garden; 18,624 | 0–2 |
| 3 | May 19 | Boston | W 116–86 | LeBron James (27) | Kevin Love (14) | LeBron James (12) | Quicken Loans Arena; 20,562 | 1–2 |
| 4 | May 21 | Boston | W 111–102 | LeBron James (44) | Tristan Thompson (12) | Hill, James, Love, Smith (3) | Quicken Loans Arena; 20,562 | 2–2 |
| 5 | May 23 | @ Boston | L 83–96 | LeBron James (26) | LeBron James (10) | LeBron James (5) | TD Garden; 18,624 | 2–3 |
| 6 | May 25 | Boston | W 109–99 | LeBron James (46) | LeBron James (11) | LeBron James (9) | Quicken Loans Arena; 20,562 | 3–3 |
| 7 | May 27 | @ Boston | W 87–79 | LeBron James (35) | LeBron James (15) | LeBron James (9) | TD Garden; 18,624 | 4–3 |

NBA Finals: 0–4 (home: 0–2; road: 0–2)

| Game | Date | Team | Score | High points | High rebounds | High assists | Location Attendance | Series |
|---|---|---|---|---|---|---|---|---|
| 1 | May 31 | @ Golden State | L 114–124 (OT) | LeBron James (51) | Kevin Love (12) | LeBron James (8) | Oracle Arena; 19,596 | 0–1 |
| 2 | June 3 | @ Golden State | L 103–122 | LeBron James (29) | Kevin Love (10) | LeBron James (13) | Oracle Arena; 19,596 | 0–2 |
| 3 | June 6 | Golden State | L 102–110 | LeBron James (33) | Kevin Love (13) | LeBron James (11) | Quicken Loans Arena; 20,562 | 0–3 |
| 4 | June 8 | Golden State | L 85–108 | LeBron James (23) | Kevin Love (9) | LeBron James (8) | Quicken Loans Arena; 20,562 | 0–4 |

2018 playoff schedule

== Player statistics ==
Legend
| GP | Games played | GS | Games started | MPG | Minutes per game |
| FG% | Field-goal percentage | 3P% | 3-point field-goal percentage | FT% | Free-throw percentage |
| RPG | Rebounds per game | APG | Assists per game | SPG | Steals per game |
| BPG | Blocks per game | PPG | Points per game |

=== Regular season ===
| Player | GP | GS | MPG | FG% | 3P% | FT% | RPG | APG | SPG | BPG | PPG |
|---|---|---|---|---|---|---|---|---|---|---|---|
| LeBron James | 82 | 82 | 36.9 | .542 | .367 | .731 | 8.6 | 9.1 | 1.4 | .9 | 27.5 |
| J. R. Smith | 80 | 61 | 28.1 | .403 | .375 | .696 | 2.9 | 1.8 | .9 | .1 | 8.3 |
| Jeff Green | 78 | 14 | 23.4 | .477 | .312 | .868 | 3.2 | 1.3 | .5 | .4 | 10.8 |
| Kyle Korver | 73 | 4 | 21.6 | .459 | .436 | .889 | 2.3 | 1.2 | .4 | .4 | 9.2 |
| Cedi Osman | 61 | 12 | 11.0 | .484 | .368 | .565 | 2.0 | .7 | .4 | .0 | 3.9 |
| Kevin Love | 59 | 59 | 28.0 | .458 | .415 | .880 | 9.3 | 1.7 | .7 | .4 | 17.6 |
| José Calderón | 57 | 32 | 16.0 | .503 | .464 | .800 | 1.5 | 2.1 | .5 | .0 | 4.5 |
| Jae Crowder^{†} | 53 | 47 | 25.4 | .418 | .328 | .848 | 3.3 | 1.1 | .8 | .2 | 8.6 |
| Tristan Thompson | 53 | 22 | 20.2 | .562 | | .544 | 6.6 | .6 | .3 | .3 | 5.8 |
| Dwyane Wade^{†} | 46 | 3 | 23.2 | .455 | .329 | .701 | 3.9 | 3.5 | .9 | .7 | 11.2 |
| Channing Frye^{†} | 44 | 1 | 12.4 | .497 | .333 | .933 | 2.5 | .6 | .4 | .3 | 4.8 |
| Ante Žižić | 32 | 2 | 6.7 | .731 | | .724 | 1.9 | .2 | .1 | .4 | 3.7 |
| Jordan Clarkson^{†} | 28 | 0 | 22.6 | .456 | .407 | .810 | 2.1 | 1.7 | .7 | .1 | 12.6 |
| George Hill^{†} | 24 | 24 | 27.9 | .444 | .351 | .805 | 2.7 | 2.8 | .9 | .6 | 9.4 |
| Larry Nance Jr.^{†} | 24 | 9 | 20.8 | .550 | .125 | .720 | 7.0 | 1.0 | 1.2 | .8 | 8.9 |
| John Holland | 24 | 0 | 7.3 | .288 | .306 | .692 | 1.0 | .2 | .3 | .1 | 2.3 |
| Rodney Hood^{†} | 21 | 11 | 25.3 | .442 | .352 | .813 | 2.6 | 1.4 | .7 | .2 | 10.8 |
| Derrick Rose^{†} | 16 | 7 | 19.3 | .439 | .250 | .854 | 1.8 | 1.6 | .2 | .3 | 9.8 |
| Isaiah Thomas^{†} | 15 | 14 | 27.1 | .361 | .253 | .868 | 2.1 | 4.5 | .6 | .1 | 14.7 |
| Iman Shumpert | 14 | 6 | 19.7 | .379 | .269 | .733 | 2.9 | 1.2 | .6 | .3 | 4.4 |
| London Perrantes | 14 | 0 | 4.7 | .154 | .000 | .600 | .3 | .4 | .1 | .1 | .5 |
| Kendrick Perkins | 1 | 0 | 15.0 | .500 | | .500 | 1.0 | 2.0 | 1.0 | .0 | 3.0 |

=== Playoffs ===
| Player | GP | GS | MPG | FG% | 3P% | FT% | RPG | APG | SPG | BPG | PPG |
|---|---|---|---|---|---|---|---|---|---|---|---|
| LeBron James | 22 | 22 | 41.9 | .539 | .342 | .746 | 9.1 | 9.0 | 1.4 | 1.0 | 34.0 |
| J. R. Smith | 22 | 21 | 32.1 | .348 | .367 | .773 | 2.7 | 1.1 | 1.0 | .2 | 8.7 |
| Kyle Korver | 22 | 11 | 23.0 | .418 | .413 | .864 | 2.4 | .9 | .4 | .4 | 8.3 |
| Jeff Green | 22 | 2 | 23.8 | .408 | .300 | .717 | 2.4 | 1.5 | .3 | .7 | 7.7 |
| Kevin Love | 21 | 21 | 31.4 | .392 | .340 | .922 | 10.2 | 1.6 | .7 | .4 | 14.9 |
| Larry Nance Jr. | 20 | 0 | 15.4 | .683 | .000 | .452 | 4.5 | .9 | .8 | .7 | 4.8 |
| George Hill | 19 | 18 | 29.3 | .450 | .314 | .774 | 2.2 | 2.2 | .5 | .4 | 9.2 |
| Tristan Thompson | 19 | 11 | 21.9 | .590 | .000 | .741 | 5.9 | .6 | .1 | .4 | 6.2 |
| Jordan Clarkson | 19 | 0 | 15.1 | .301 | .239 | .833 | 1.7 | .7 | .4 | .2 | 4.7 |
| Rodney Hood | 17 | 1 | 15.3 | .424 | .167 | .750 | 1.8 | 1.1 | .3 | .2 | 5.4 |
| Cedi Osman | 14 | 0 | 4.4 | .333 | .143 | .250 | .5 | .2 | .2 | .0 | 1.0 |
| José Calderón | 13 | 3 | 8.0 | .346 | .222 | 1.000 | .8 | .7 | .4 | .0 | 1.8 |
| Ante Žižić | 8 | 0 | 2.9 | .500 | | .500 | .8 | .1 | .0 | .1 | 1.6 |

- ^{†} Denotes player spent time with another team in the season. Stats reflect time with the Cavaliers only.

== Transactions ==
=== Trades ===
| August 30, 2017 | To Cleveland Cavaliers Isaiah Thomas; Jae Crowder; Ante Žižić; 2018 first-round pick (from Brooklyn); 2020 second-round pick (from Miami) | To Boston Celtics Kyrie Irving |
| October 14, 2017 | To Cleveland Cavaliers Rights to Sergiy Gladyr; Rights to Dimitrios Agravanis | To Atlanta Hawks Richard Jefferson; Kay Felder; 2019 second-round pick 2020 Portland second-round pick Cash considerations |
February 8, 2018
| February 8, 2018 | To Cleveland Cavaliers Rodney Hood (from Utah); George Hill (from Sacramento); Draft rights to Artūras Gudaitis (from Sacramento) | To Sacramento Kings Joe Johnson (from Utah); Iman Shumpert (from Cleveland); 2020 second-round pick (from Miami via Cleveland); Draft rights to Dimitrios Agravanis (from Cleveland); Cash considerations (from Cleveland and Utah) |
| February 8, 2018 | To Utah Jazz Jae Crowder (from Cleveland); Derrick Rose (from Cleveland); Right to swap 2024 second-round picks with Cleveland | |
February 8, 2018
| February 8, 2018 | To Cleveland Cavaliers Larry Nance Jr. Jordan Clarkson | To Los Angeles Lakers Isaiah Thomas; Channing Frye; 2018 first-round pick (from Cleveland) |
| February 8, 2018 | To Cleveland Cavaliers Conditional 2024 second-round pick | To Miami Heat Dwyane Wade |

=== Free agency ===
==== Re-signed ====
| Player | Signed |
|---|---|
| Kyle Korver | 3-year contract worth $22 million |

==== Additions ====
| Player | Signed | Former team |
|---|---|---|
| José Calderón | 1-year contract worth $2.3 million | Atlanta Hawks |
| Jeff Green | 1-year contract worth $2.3 million | Orlando Magic |
| Cedi Osman | 3-year contract worth $8.3 million | (Turkey) Anadolu Efes |
| Derrick Rose | 1-year contract worth $2.1 million | New York Knicks |
| John Holland | Two-way contract | Canton Charge |
| Dwyane Wade | 1-year contract worth $2.3 million | Chicago Bulls |
| London Perrantes | Two-way contract | Virginia Cavaliers |
| Marcus Thornton | Signed a 10-day contract | Canton Charge |
| Kendrick Perkins | Signed for the rest of the season | Canton Charge |

==== Subtractions ====
| Player | Reason left | New team |
|---|---|---|
| James Jones | Retired | Phoenix Suns (Vice President of Basketball Operations) |
| Walter Tavares | Waived | Raptors 905 / (Spain) Real Madrid Baloncesto |
| Derrick Williams | UFA | (China) Tianjin Gold Lions / Los Angeles Lakers |
| Deron Williams | UFA | Unknown |
