= Rodney Hood =

American basketball player (born 1992)

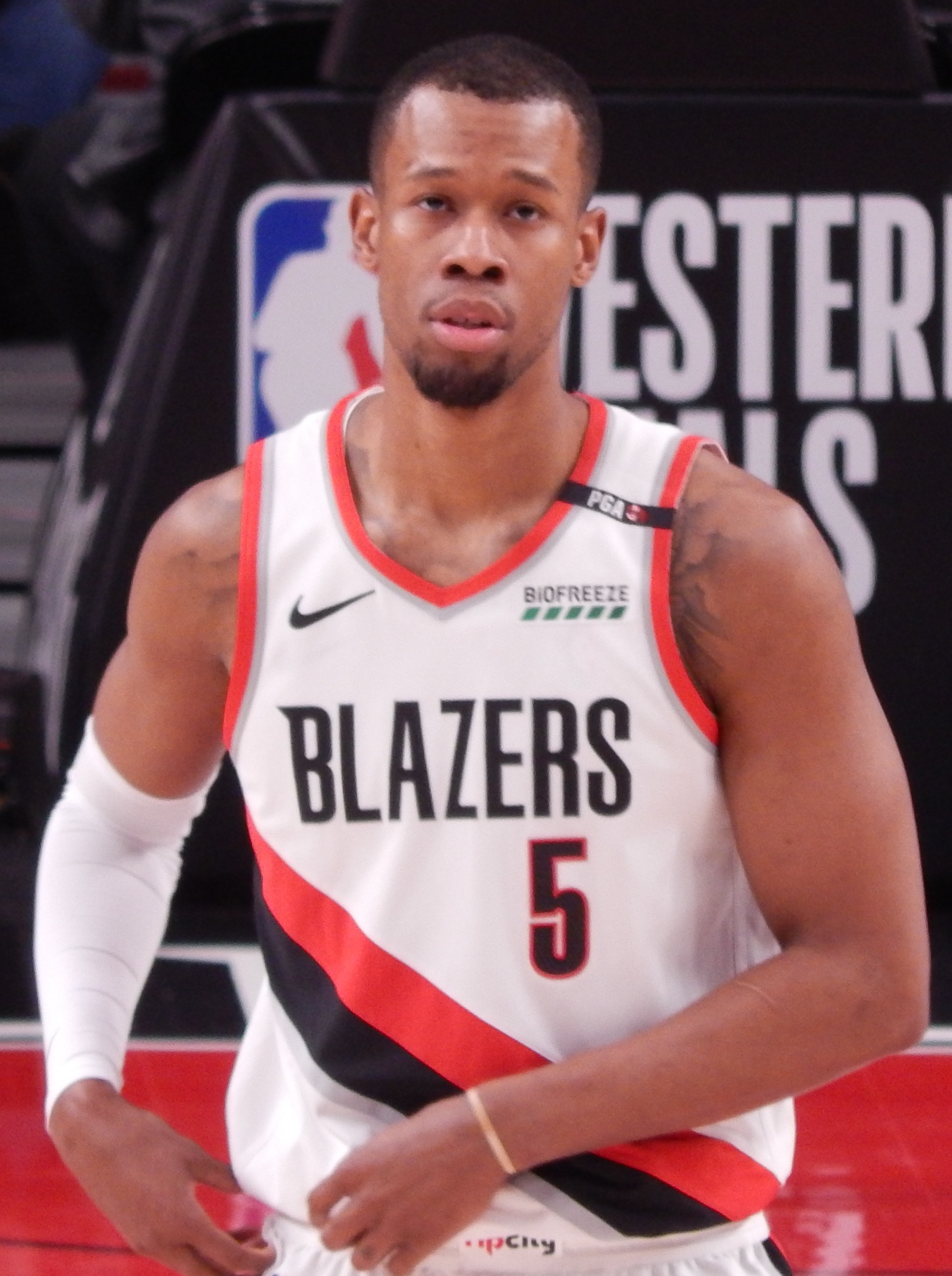
- Hood with the Portland Trail Blazers in 2019

Personal information
- Born: October 20, 1992 (age 34) Meridian, Mississippi, U.S.
- Listed height: 6 ft 8 in (2.03 m)
- Listed weight: 208 lb (94 kg)

Career information
- High school: Meridian (Meridian, Mississippi)
- College: Mississippi State (2011–2012); Duke (2013–2014)
- NBA draft: 2014: 1st round, 23rd overall pick
- Drafted by: Utah Jazz
- Playing career: 2014–2024
- Position: Small forward / shooting guard
- Number: 1, 5, 22, 32

Career history
- 2014–2018: Utah Jazz
- 2018–2019: Cleveland Cavaliers
- 2019–2021: Portland Trail Blazers
- 2021: Toronto Raptors
- 2021–2022: Milwaukee Bucks
- 2022: Los Angeles Clippers
- 2024: Memphis Hustle

Career highlights
- Second-team All-ACC (2014); SEC All-Freshman Team (2012); Mississippi Mr. Basketball (2011)
- Stats at NBA.com
- Stats at Basketball Reference

Rodney Michael Hood (born October 20, 1992) is an American former professional basketball player. He played college basketball for Mississippi State and Duke before declaring for the NBA Draft. Hood was drafted in 2014 by the Utah Jazz; and in 2018, he was dealt to the Cleveland Cavaliers. He was then traded to the Portland Trail Blazers in 2019. He was then traded to the Toronto Raptors in 2021. He signed with the Milwaukee Bucks as a free agent for the 2021–2022 season before being traded to the Los Angeles Clippers before the 2022 trade deadline.

== High school career ==
Hood attended Meridian High School in the city of Meridian, Mississippi. As a junior in the 2009–10 season, he averaged 22.1 points, 6.2 rebounds, and 4.4 assists per game while leading the Wildcats to the Class 6A finals. Thus Meridian advanced past each school in the Mississippi High School Activities Association's tournament, only to fall to Starkville in the championship game, 57–51.

As a senior, Hood posted averages of 24.8 points, 8.6 rebounds, 6.4 assists, 3.1 steals, and 2 blocks per contest, as he propelled Meridian to a 29–2 record and helped them capture a Class 6A championship. During the semifinals of that 2010–11 campaign, he tallied 27 points when Meridian defeated Starkville, 72–43; and in the title game against Vicksburg, he scored 24 points en route to the 62–47 victory.

Considered a five-star recruit by Rivals.com, Hood was ranked as the No. 5 small forward and the No. 16 player in the nation in 2011. In October 2010, he committed to Mississippi State University.

Hood's childhood neighbor was Paramore lead singer Hayley Williams; Hood did not know this until March 2021.

== College career ==
As a freshman at Mississippi State, Hood started in 29 of the 32 games that he played for the Bulldogs in 2011–12. He was named to the Southeastern Conference (SEC) All-Freshman Team after averaging 10.3 points, 4.8 rebounds, and 2 assists per contest while shooting 44.3 percent from the field and 36.4 percent from three-point range.

In July 2012, Rodney transferred to Duke University. Despite having to sit out the 2012–13 season in accordance with NCAA transfer rules, he consistently helped the team improve in practice and quickly established himself as one of the top players on the team.

In his second year at Duke, he was selected as the team captain for the Blue Devil's 2013–14 campaign. The six-foot-eight small forward would play in 35 games, starting in 33 of them. He would average 16.1 points, 3.9 rebounds, and 2.1 assists in 32.9 minutes per game. He did so while shooting 46.4 percent from the field, including 42 percent from distance on the season. He earned second-team All-Atlantic Coast Conference (ACC) honors for his performance.

In April 2014, Hood declared for the NBA draft, forgoing his final two years of college eligibility.

== Professional career ==
=== Utah Jazz (2014–2018) ===
On June 26, 2014, Hood was selected with the 23rd pick in the 2014 NBA draft by the Utah Jazz, later signing his rookie-scale contract with the team on July 11. On March 16, 2015, he finished with a season-best 24 points after converting 9-of-11 shots from the field and 5-of-5 from behind the arc; thus he helped the Jazz beat the Charlotte Hornets, 94–66, their sixth consecutive win.

Having solidified his role in the starting lineup, Hood started in all 79 of the games that he played in 2015–16. He established himself as a go-to offensive option and reliable asset all around. Hood had 61 outings with double digits and 15 with 20-plus points. On January 2, 2016, he posted a career-high 32 points against the Memphis Grizzlies as the Jazz secured a 92–87 win in overtime.

In the 2016–17 season opener on October 25, Hood added 26 points, to include a rim-rattling dunk and consecutive jumpers in the third quarter to give Utah a 77–71 lead, though the Jazz ultimately fell to the Portland Trail Blazers, 113–104. On December 16, 2016, he hit the first game-clincher of his NBA career, pulling up for a three-pointer in transition with 0.8 seconds left; the shot secured a 103–100 victory over the Dallas Mavericks. He finished the contest with 15 points. On January 13, 2017, he scored a season-high 27 points during a 110–77 win over the Detroit Pistons. He recorded a new season-best 28 points on March 5 as the Jazz defeated the Sacramento Kings, 110–109, in overtime.

In the 2017–18 campaign, Hood scored a season-high 25 points, 15 of which were in the third quarter, as he helped the Jazz rally and defeat the Dallas Mavericks, 104–89, on October 30, 2017. On November 18, during a 125–85 victory over the Orlando Magic, he set a new season high with 31 points and did so coming off the bench. Hood did not finish the season with Utah before being traded.

=== Cleveland Cavaliers (2018–2019) ===
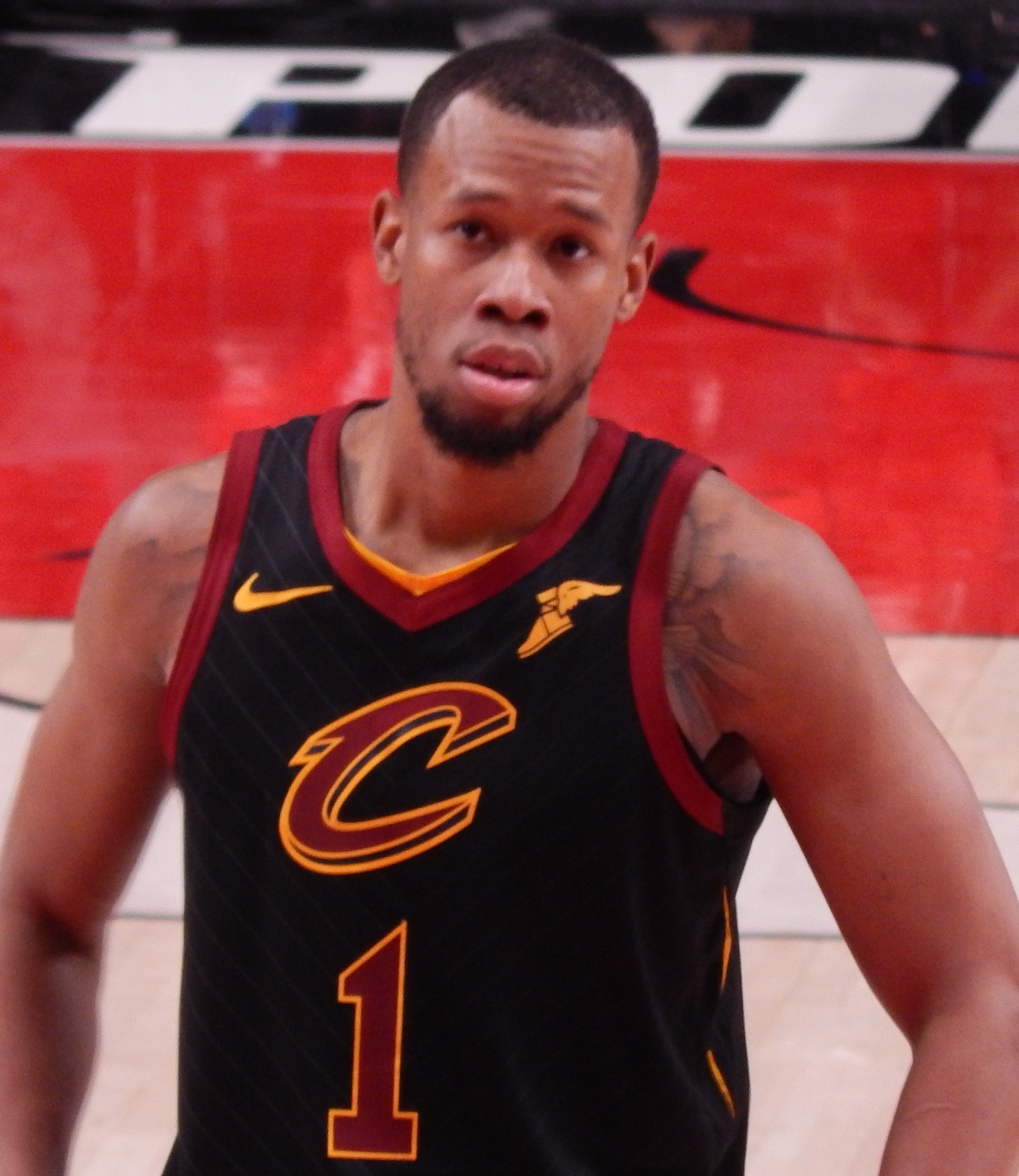
Hood with the Cleveland Cavaliers in 2019

On February 8, 2018, Hood was acquired by the Cleveland Cavaliers in a three-team trade that also involved the Jazz and the Sacramento Kings. In his debut for the Cavaliers three days later, he scored 15 points during a 121–99 win over the Boston Celtics. On May 7, 2018, Hood refused to enter Game 4 vs the Toronto Raptors with the Cavaliers up 110–80 with 7:38 left in the 4th Quarter over frustrations relating to a lack of playing time. He later apologized. The Cavaliers made it to the 2018 NBA Finals, but would lose 4–0 to the Golden State Warriors.

On September 10, 2018, Hood re-signed with the Cavaliers. On October 30, in a 136–114 victory over the Atlanta Hawks, he scored a season-high 26 points to help snap Cleveland's six-game losing streak.

=== Portland Trail Blazers (2019–2021) ===
On February 4, 2019, Hood was traded to the Portland Trail Blazers in exchange for Nik Stauskas, Wade Baldwin IV, and two future second-round picks. On March 3, 2019, he scored a season-high 27 points, all in the second half, in a 118–108 win over the Charlotte Hornets. In Game 6 of the Trail Blazers' second-round playoff series against the Denver Nuggets, Hood scored a playoff career-high 25 points in a 119–108 victory. For the third consecutive season all with different teams, Hood was eliminated from the playoffs in a 4-game sweep by the Golden State Warriors. On December 6, 2019, the Trail Blazers announced that Hood would be out for the rest of the 2019–2020 season and may miss the start of next season as well since he incurred a torn left Achilles during a 136–113 loss to the Los Angeles Lakers.

=== Toronto Raptors (2021) ===
On March 25, 2021, Hood along with Gary Trent Jr. were traded to the Toronto Raptors in exchange for Norman Powell. On August 3, he was waived by the Raptors.

=== Milwaukee Bucks (2021–2022) ===
On August 6, 2021, Hood signed with the Milwaukee Bucks on a one-year, veteran's minimum contract. On December 12, Hood scored a season high 14 points, while shooting 100% from the field, in a 112–97 win over the New York Knicks.

=== Los Angeles Clippers (2022) ===
On February 10, 2022, Hood was traded to the Los Angeles Clippers as part of a four-team trade.

=== Memphis Hustle (2024) ===
On February 11, 2024, Hood joined the Memphis Hustle of the NBA G League.

On November 21, 2024, Hood announced his retirement.

== National team career ==
In July 2016, Hood joined the United States men's select team to train with the 2016 Olympic team.

In November 2022, Hood was chosen to represent Team USA in the second round of the 2023 FIBA Basketball World Cup qualification.

== Career statistics ==
Legend
| GP | Games played | GS | Games started | MPG | Minutes per game |
| FG% | Field goal percentage | 3P% | 3-point field goal percentage | FT% | Free throw percentage |
| RPG | Rebounds per game | APG | Assists per game | SPG | Steals per game |
| BPG | Blocks per game | PPG | Points per game | **Bold** | Career high |

=== NBA ===
==== Regular season ====
| Year | Team | GP | GS | MPG | FG% | 3P% | FT% | RPG | APG | SPG | BPG | PPG |
|---|---|---|---|---|---|---|---|---|---|---|---|---|
| 2014–15 | Utah | 50 | 21 | 21.3 | .414 | .365 | .763 | 2.3 | 1.7 | .6 | .2 | 8.7 |
| 2015–16 | Utah | **79** | **79** | **32.2** | .420 | .359 | .860 | **3.4** | **2.7** | **.9** | .2 | 14.5 |
| 2016–17 | Utah | 59 | 55 | 27.0 | .408 | .371 | .783 | **3.4** | 1.6 | .6 | .2 | 12.7 |
| 2017–18 | Utah | 39 | 12 | 27.8 | .424 | .389 | .876 | 2.8 | 1.7 | .8 | .2 | **16.8** |
| 2017–18 | Cleveland | 21 | 11 | 25.3 | .442 | .352 | .813 | 2.6 | 1.4 | .7 | .2 | 10.8 |
| 2018–19 | Cleveland | 45 | 45 | 27.4 | .427 | .362 | .912 | 2.5 | 2.0 | .8 | .1 | 12.2 |
| 2018–19 | Portland | 27 | 4 | 24.4 | .452 | .345 | .805 | 1.7 | 1.3 | .8 | **.3** | 9.6 |
| 2019–20 | Portland | 21 | 21 | 29.5 | **.506** | .493 | .778 | **3.4** | 1.5 | .8 | .2 | 11.0 |
| 2020–21 | Portland | 38 | 5 | 19.1 | .363 | .298 | .750 | 1.9 | 1.2 | .5 | .1 | 4.7 |
| 2020–21 | Toronto | 17 | 0 | 12.7 | .356 | .310 | **.938** | 1.8 | .4 | .2 | .2 | 3.9 |
| 2021–22 | Milwaukee | 39 | 0 | 14.9 | .351 | .300 | .929 | 1.7 | .8 | .3 | .1 | 3.3 |
| 2021–22 | L.A. Clippers | 13 | 0 | 9.8 | .462 | **.545** | .800 | .8 | .6 | .2 | .2 | 2.6 |
| Career | | 448 | 253 | 24.5 | .420 | .366 | .841 | 2.6 | 1.6 | .7 | .2 | 10.4 |

==== Playoffs ====
| Year | Team | GP | GS | MPG | FG% | 3P% | FT% | RPG | APG | SPG | BPG | PPG |
|---|---|---|---|---|---|---|---|---|---|---|---|---|
| 2017 | Utah | 11 | 0 | **25.2** | .352 | .260 | .611 | **2.7** | **1.1** | **.5** | .0 | 8.9 |
| 2018 | Cleveland | **17** | **1** | 15.3 | .424 | .167 | .750 | 1.8 | **1.1** | .3 | **.2** | 5.4 |
| 2019 | Portland | 16 | 0 | 23.3 | **.468** | **.353** | **.818** | 2.3 | .9 | .4 | **.2** | **9.9** |
| Career | | 44 | 1 | 20.7 | .416 | .280 | .757 | 2.2 | 1.0 | .4 | .2 | 7.9 |

=== College ===
| Year | Team | GP | GS | MPG | FG% | 3P% | FT% | RPG | APG | SPG | BPG | PPG |
|---|---|---|---|---|---|---|---|---|---|---|---|---|
| 2011–12 | Mississippi State | 32 | 29 | 32.8 | .443 | .364 | .659 | **4.8** | 2.0 | .4 | **.4** | 10.3 |
| 2013–14 | Duke | **35** | **33** | **32.9** | **.464** | **.420** | **.807** | 3.9 | **2.1** | **.7** | .3 | **16.1** |
| Career | | 67 | 62 | 32.8 | .455 | .396 | .773 | 4.3 | 2.1 | .6 | .3 | 13.3 |

== Personal life ==
On January 3, 2016, Hood's fiancé, Richa Jackson, gave birth to the couple's first child, a son. On July 29, Hood married Jackson in Oklahoma City, Oklahoma.

On April 18, 2018, Jackson gave birth to a set of twins named Rich and Riley, respectively.
