= Bessemer (surname) =

Bessemer is a German occupational surname for a broom maker (besem meaning broom in Middle High German). It may refer to the following notable people:

- Anthony Bessemer (1758–1836 or after 1840), British engineer and industrialist
- Auriel Bessemer (1909–1986), American painter
- Henry Bessemer, (1813–1898), English inventor of the Bessemer process
- H. W. Bessemer, (1865–1956), British philatelist
- Leonard Bessemer Pfeil (1898–1969), British metallurgist

== See also ==
- Bazemore (surname)
