= 2017–18 Atlanta Hawks season =

Season of National Basketball Association team the Atlanta Hawks

- Head coach: Mike Budenholzer
- General manager: Travis Schlenk
- Owners: Tony Ressler
- Arena: Philips Arena

Results
- Record: 24–58 (.293)
- Place: Division: 5th (Southeast); Conference: 15th (Eastern)
- Playoff finish: Did not qualify
- Stats at Basketball Reference

Local media
- Television: Fox Sports South
- Radio: 92.9 FM "The Game"

The 2017–18 Atlanta Hawks season was the 69th season of the franchise in the National Basketball Association (NBA) and the 50th in Atlanta. For the first time since 2013, Paul Millsap was not on the roster, as he signed with the Denver Nuggets in free agency. This was the first time the Hawks missed the playoffs since 2007, and made them the second NBA team to go 60 years without winning a title. This season would also be the last with Mike Budenholzer coaching the Hawks, as he would part with them after the season ended on April 25, 2018, later joining the Milwaukee Bucks in May.

== Draft picks ==
Round	Pick	Player	Position	Nationality	School/Club team
1	19	John Collins	PF	United States	Wake Forest
2	41	Tyler Dorsey	SG	United States; Greece	Oregon
2	60	Alpha Kaba	PF/C	France	(Serbia) Mega Leks

== Roster ==
2017–18 Atlanta Hawks roster
Players

Pos.	No.	Player	Height	Weight	DOB	From
G	24	Kent Bazemore (injured)	6 ft 5 in (1.96 m)	201 lb (91 kg)	1989–07–01	Old Dominion
G/F	95	DeAndre' Bembry	6 ft 6 in (1.98 m)	210 lb (95 kg)	1994–07–04	Saint Joseph's
F	34	Tyler Cavanaugh	6 ft 9 in (2.06 m)	238 lb (108 kg)	1994-02-09	George Washington
G	0	Antonius Cleveland	6 ft 6 in (1.98 m)	195 lb (88 kg)	1994–02–02	Southeast Missouri State
F/C	20	John Collins	6 ft 10 in (2.08 m)	235 lb (107 kg)	1997–09–23	Wake Forest
C	14	Dewayne Dedmon	7 ft 0 in (2.13 m)	245 lb (111 kg)	1989–08–12	USC
G	5	Malcolm Delaney	6 ft 3 in (1.91 m)	190 lb (86 kg)	1989–03–11	Virginia Tech
G	2	Tyler Dorsey	6 ft 5 in (1.96 m)	183 lb (83 kg)	1996–02–18	Oregon
G	8	Damion Lee	6 ft 6 in (1.98 m)	210 lb (95 kg)	1992–10–21	Louisville
G	11	Josh Magette (TW)	6 ft 1 in (1.85 m)	160 lb (73 kg)	1989–11–28	Alabama–Huntsville
G	3	Jaylen Morris	6 ft 5 in (1.96 m)	185 lb (84 kg)	1995–09–19	Molloy
F/C	31	Mike Muscala	6 ft 11 in (2.11 m)	240 lb (109 kg)	1991–07–01	Bucknell
C	18	Miles Plumlee	6 ft 11 in (2.11 m)	249 lb (113 kg)	1988–09–01	Duke
F	12	Taurean Prince	6 ft 8 in (2.03 m)	220 lb (100 kg)	1994–03–22	Baylor
G	17	Dennis Schröder	6 ft 1 in (1.85 m)	172 lb (78 kg)	1993–09–15	Germany
G	22	Isaiah Taylor	6 ft 3 in (1.91 m)	170 lb (77 kg)	1994–07–11	Texas
F	4	Andrew White (TW)	6 ft 7 in (2.01 m)	210 lb (95 kg)	1993–06–16	Syracuse

Coaches
Head coach
- Mike Budenholzer
Assistant(s)
- Darvin Ham
- Taylor Jenkins
- Chris Jent
- Charles Lee
- Patrick St. Andrews
- Ben Sullivan
- Pete Radulovic (player development)

Legend
- (DP) Unsigned draft pick
- (FA) Free agent
- (S) Suspended
- (GL) On assignment to G League affiliate
- (TW) Two-way affiliate player
- Injured

Roster
Updated: 2018–04–10

== Standings ==
=== Division ===
Southeast Division	W	L	PCT	GB	Home	Road	Div	GP
y – Miami Heat	44	38	.537	–	26‍–‍15	18‍–‍23	11–5	82
x – Washington Wizards	43	39	.524	1.0	23‍–‍18	20‍–‍21	8–8	82
Charlotte Hornets	36	46	.439	8.0	21‍–‍20	15‍–‍26	11–5	82
Orlando Magic	25	57	.305	19.0	17‍–‍24	8‍–‍33	5–11	82
Atlanta Hawks	24	58	.293	20.0	16‍–‍25	8‍–‍33	5–11	82

=== Conference ===
Eastern Conference
#	Team	W	L	PCT	GB	GP
1	c – Toronto Raptors *	59	23	.720	–	82
2	x – Boston Celtics	55	27	.671	4.0	82
3	x – Philadelphia 76ers	52	30	.634	7.0	82
4	y – Cleveland Cavaliers *	50	32	.610	9.0	82
5	x – Indiana Pacers	48	34	.585	11.0	82
6	y – Miami Heat *	44	38	.537	15.0	82
7	x – Milwaukee Bucks	44	38	.537	15.0	82
8	x – Washington Wizards	43	39	.524	16.0	82
9	Detroit Pistons	39	43	.476	20.0	82
10	Charlotte Hornets	36	46	.439	23.0	82
11	New York Knicks	29	53	.354	30.0	82
12	Brooklyn Nets	28	54	.341	31.0	82
13	Chicago Bulls	27	55	.329	32.0	82
14	Orlando Magic	25	57	.305	34.0	82
15	Atlanta Hawks	24	58	.293	35.0	82

== Game log ==
=== Preseason ===
2017 pre-season game log
Total: 2–3 (Home: 1–1; Road: 1–2)
Pre-season: 2–3 (home: 1–1; road: 1–2)

Game	Date	Team	Score	High points	High rebounds	High assists	Location Attendance	Record
1	October 1	@ Miami	L 90–96	Dedmon, Schröder (12)	John Collins (15)	Dennis Schröder (5)	American Airlines Arena; 19,600	0–1
2	October 4	@ Cleveland	W 109–93	Dennis Schröder (13)	Taurean Prince (8)	Malcolm Delaney (6)	Quicken Loans Arena; 18,221	1–1
3	October 6	@ Detroit	L 87–109	Malcolm Delaney (15)	John Collins (6)	Malcolm Delaney (5)	Little Caesars Arena; 14,496	1–2
4	October 9	Memphis	W 100–88	Dennis Schroder (21)	John Collins (8)	Malcolm Delaney (5)	McCamish Pavilion; 7,262	2–2
5	October 12	Dallas	L 94–108	Kent Bazemore (20)	Dewayne Dedmon (10)	Kent Bazemore (5)	McCamish Pavilion; 6,759	2–3

2017–18 season schedule

=== Regular season ===
2017–18 game log
Total: 24–58 (Home: 16–25; Road: 8–33)
October: 1–6 (home: 0–2; road: 1–4)

Game	Date	Team	Score	High points	High rebounds	High assists	Location Attendance	Record
1	October 18	@ Dallas	W 117–111	Dennis Schroder (28)	Taurean Prince (10)	Dennis Schroder (7)	American Airlines Center; 19,709	1–0
2	October 20	@ Charlotte	L 91–109	Dennis Schroder (25)	Dewayne Dedmon (7)	Dennis Schroder (5)	Spectrum Center; 18,417	1–1
3	October 22	@ Brooklyn	L 104–116	Marco Belinelli (31)	John Collins (13)	Dennis Schroder (8)	Barclays Center; 13,917	1–2
4	October 23	@ Miami	L 93–104	Bazemore, Prince (20)	John Collins (11)	Kent Bazemore (4)	American Airlines Arena; 19,600	1–3
5	October 26	@ Chicago	L 86–91	Marco Belinelli (23)	Dedmon, Muscala (10)	Dedmon, Delaney, Muscala (4)	United Center; 21,104	1–4
6	October 27	Denver	L 100–105	Dennis Schroder (20)	Dewayne Dedmon (10)	Dennis Schroder (6)	Philips Arena; 16,220	1–5
7	October 29	Milwaukee	L 106–117	Dennis Schroder (21)	John Collins (7)	Dennis Schroder (8)	Philips Arena; 14,014	1–6

November : 3–11 (home: 2–6; road: 1–5)

Game	Date	Team	Score	High points	High rebounds	High assists	Location Attendance	Record
8	November 1	@ Philadelphia	L 109–119	Dennis Schroder (25)	Taurean Prince (11)	Dennis Schroder (6)	Wells Fargo Center; 20,549	1–7
9	November 3	Houston	L 104–119	Kent Bazemore (18)	John Collins (13)	Isaiah Taylor (5)	Philips Arena; 14,087	1–8
10	November 5	@ Cleveland	W 117–115	Dennis Schroder (28)	John Collins (13)	Dennis Schroder (9)	Wells Fargo Center; 20,562	2–8
11	November 6	Boston	L 107–110	Dennis Schroder (23)	Dewayne Dedmon (12)	Dennis Schroder (6)	Philips Arena; 13,215	2–9
12	November 10	@ Detroit	L 104–111	Kent Bazemore (22)	Dewayne Dedmon (9)	Dennis Schroder (11)	Little Caesars Arena; 16,687	2–10
13	November 11	@ Washington	L 94–113	Taurean Prince (19)	Dewayne Dedmon (8)	Dennis Schroder (5)	Capital One Arena; 17,260	2–11
14	November 13	@ New Orleans	L 105–106	Kent Bazemore (22)	Cavanaugh, Collins, Dedmon (6)	Kent Bazemore (7)	Smoothie King Center; 14,631	2–12
15	November 15	Sacramento	W 126–80	Dennis Schroder (21)	Dewayne Dedmon (14)	Dennis Schroder (8)	Philips Arena; 13,860	3–12
16	November 18	Boston	L 99–110	Dennis Schroder (23)	Dewayne Dedmon (8)	Dennis Schroder (9)	Philips Arena; 16,381	3–13
17	November 20	@ San Antonio	L 85–96	Taurean Prince (18)	Collins, Dedmon (9)	Dennis Schroder (9)	AT&T Center; 18,418	3–14
18	November 22	LA Clippers	L 103–116	Marco Belinelli (20)	John Collins (10)	Dennis Schroder (7)	Philips Arena; 12,675	3–15
19	November 24	New York	W 116–104	Dennis Schroder (26)	Taurean Prince (8)	Dennis Schroder (8)	Philips Arena; 14,355	4–15
20	November 25	Toronto	L 78–112	Dennis Schroder (14)	Bazemore, Bembry, Cavanaugh, Ilyasova, Schroder (4)	Josh Magette (6)	Philips Arena; 12,278	4–16
21	November 30	Cleveland	L 114–121	Dennis Schroder (27)	John Collins (7)	Kent Bazemore (6)	Philips Arena; 16,379	4–17

December : 6–9 (home: 5–3; road: 1–6)

Game	Date	Team	Score	High points	High rebounds	High assists	Location Attendance	Record
22	December 2	@ Brooklyn	W 114–102	Dennis Schroder (24)	Ersan Ilyasova (11)	Dennis Schroder (6)	Barclays Center; 13,949	5–17
23	December 4	Brooklyn	L 90–110	Dennis Schroder (19)	Miles Plumlee (7)	Dennis Schroder (4)	Philips Arena; 12,056	5–18
24	December 6	@ Orlando	L 106–110 (OT)	Dennis Schroder (26)	Belinelli, Ilyasova (7)	Bazemore, Schroder (7)	Amway Center; 16,167	5–19
25	December 9	Orlando	W 117–110	Ersan Ilyasova (26)	Babbitt, Cavanaugh (8)	Bazemore, Schroder (7)	Philips Arena; 12,719	6–19
26	December 10	@ New York	L 107–111	Dennis Schroder (21)	Taurean Prince (8)	Taurean Prince (5)	Madison Square Garden; 19,189	6–20
27	December 12	@ Cleveland	L 114–123	Taurean Prince (24)	Tyler Cavanaugh (9)	Taurean Prince (6)	Quicken Loans Arena; 20,562	6–21
28	December 14	Detroit	L 91–105	Ersan Ilyasova (23)	John Collins (7)	Dennis Schroder (10)	Philips Arena; 13,548	6–22
29	December 15	@ Memphis	L 94–96	Kent Bazemore (19)	John Collins (7)	Dennis Schroder (11)	FedExForum; 15,803	6–23
30	December 18	Miami	W 110–104	Taurean Prince (24)	Taurean Prince (7)	Kent Bazemore (7)	Philips Arena; 14,227	7–23
31	December 20	Indiana	L 95–105	John Collins (18)	John Collins (9)	Dennis Schroder (8)	Philips Arena; 14,830	7–24
32	December 22	@ Oklahoma City	L 117–120	Marco Belinelli (27)	John Collins (9)	Kent Bazemore (6)	Chesapeake Energy Arena; 18,203	7–25
33	December 23	Dallas	W 112–107	Dennis Schroder (33)	Ersan Ilyasova (7)	Dennis Schroder (7)	Philips Arena; 13,402	8–25
34	December 27	Washington	W 113–99	Dennis Schroder (21)	Ilyasova, Prince (9)	Bazemore, Schroder (7)	Philips Arena; 15,763	9–25
35	December 29	@ Toronto	L 98–111	Taurean Prince (30)	Taurean Prince (10)	Dennis Schroder (9)	Air Canada Centre; 19,800	9–26
36	December 30	Portland	W 104–89	Dennis Schroder (21)	Taurean Prince (10)	Dennis Schroder (8)	Philips Arena; 15,877	10–26

January : 5–10 (home: 4–5; road: 1–5)

Game	Date	Team	Score	High points	High rebounds	High assists	Location Attendance	Record
37	January 2	@ Phoenix	L 103–104	Ersan Ilyasova (21)	Ersan Ilyasova (9)	Dennis Schroder (5)	Talking Stick Resort Arena; 15,921	10–27
38	January 5	@ Portland	L 89–110	Dennis Schroder (14)	Ersan Ilyasova (11)	Dennis Schroder (4)	Moda Center; 19,393	10–28
39	January 7	@ LA Lakers	L 113–132	Dennis Schroder (27)	Ersan Ilyasova (9)	Dennis Schroder (5)	Staples Center; 18,997	10–29
40	January 8	@ LA Clippers	L 107–108	Taurean Prince (20)	Ersan Ilyasova (13)	Malcolm Delaney (6)	Staples Center; 14,624	10–30
41	January 10	@ Denver	W 110–97	Dennis Schroder (19)	Ersan Ilyasova (9)	Dennis Schroder (10)	Pepsi Center; 14,182	11–30
42	January 12	Brooklyn	L 105–110	Dennis Schroder (34)	John Collins (10)	Dennis Schroder (7)	Philips Arena; 13,093	11–31
43	January 15	San Antonio	W 102–99	Dennis Schroder (26)	Dewayne Dedmon (10)	Dennis Schroder (7)	Philips Arena; 15,806	12–31
44	January 17	New Orleans	W 94–93	Kent Bazemore (20)	Dewayne Dedmon (10)	Dennis Schroder (15)	Philips Arena; 10,894	13–31
45	January 20	Chicago	L 97–113	Dennis Schroder (18)	Dewayne Dedmon (11)	Dennis Schroder (5)	Philips Arena; 15,597	13–32
46	January 22	Utah	W 104–90	Dennis Schroder (20)	Ersan Ilyasova (11)	Malcolm Delaney (8)	Philips Arena; 11,096	14–32
47	January 24	Toronto	L 93–108	Dennis Schroder (20)	John Collins (16)	Malcolm Delaney (4)	Philips Arena; 12,780	14–33
48	January 26	@ Charlotte	L 110–121	Kent Bazemore (26)	John Collins (9)	Malcolm Delaney (6)	Spectrum Center; 15,479	14–34
49	January 27	Washington	L 104–129	Dedmon, Dorsey, Prince (14)	Mike Muscala (6)	Dennis Schroder (7)	Philips Arena; 15,843	14–35
50	January 29	Minnesota	W 105–100	Kent Bazemore (22)	John Collins (11)	Dennis Schroder (11)	Philips Arena; 12,589	15–35
51	January 31	Charlotte	L 110–123	Kent Bazemore (25)	Dedmon, Muscala (5)	Dennis Schroder (9)	Philips Arena; 13,103	15–36

February : 4–7 (home: 3–2; road: 1–5)

Game	Date	Team	Score	High points	High rebounds	High assists	Location Attendance	Record
52	February 2	@ Boston	L 110–119	Taurean Prince (31)	Taurean Prince (8)	Malcolm Delaney (5)	TD Garden; 18,624	15–37
53	February 4	@ NY Knicks	W 99–96	Kent Bazemore (19)	Dewayne Dedmon (14)	Malcolm Delaney (8)	Madison Square Garden; 19,441	16–37
54	February 6	Memphis	W 108–82	Dennis Schroder (22)	John Collins (10)	Tyler Dorsey (7)	Philips Arena; 11,866	17–37
55	February 8	@ Orlando	L 98–100	Schroder, Prince (19)	John Collins (12)	Schroder, Prince (5)	Amway Center; 16,215	17–38
56	February 9	Cleveland	L 107–123	Dennis Schroder (25)	John Collins (7)	Schroder, Taylor (4)	Philips Arena; 16,438	17–39
57	February 11	Detroit	W 118–115	Dennis Schroder (23)	Dewayne Dedmon (13)	Dennis Schroder (7)	Philips Arena; 15,214	18–39
58	February 13	@ Milwaukee	L 92–97	Dennis Schroder (18)	Dewayne Dedmon (10)	Bazemore, Schroder, Taylor (4)	Bradley Center; 14,720	18–40
59	February 14	@ Detroit	L 98–104	Andrew White (15)	John Collins (10)	Delaney, Taylor (7)	Little Caesars Arena; 15,849	18–41
60	February 23	@ Indiana	L 93–116	Isaiah Taylor (17)	John Collins (9)	Isaiah Taylor (6)	Bankers Life Fieldhouse; 17,923	18–42
61	February 26	LA Lakers	L 104–123	Taurean Prince (24)	John Collins (9)	Bazemore, Magette (4)	Philips Arena; 16,328	18–43
62	February 28	Indiana	W 107–102	John Collins (16)	Dewayne Dedmon (9)	Bazemore, Schroder (5)	Philips Arena; 13,316	19–43

March : 2–12 (home: 1–5; road: 1–7)

Game	Date	Team	Score	High points	High rebounds	High assists	Location Attendance	Record
63	March 2	Golden State	L 109–114	Kent Bazemore (29)	John Collins (8)	Dennis Schroder (9)	Philips Arena; 16,728	19–44
64	March 4	Phoenix	W 113–112	Taurean Prince (22)	Miles Plumlee (11)	Dennis Schroder (6)	Philips Arena; 15,166	20–44
65	March 6	@ Toronto	L 90–106	Bazemore, Collins (14)	Dewayne Dedmon (10)	Kent Bazemore (5)	Air Canada Centre; 19,800	20–45
66	March 9	@ Indiana	L 87–112	Tyler Dorsey (18)	Dewayne Dedmon (7)	Josh Magette (6)	Bankers Life Fieldhouse; 17,923	20–46
67	March 11	Chicago	L 122–129	Taurean Prince (38)	Dewayne Dedmon (9)	Magette, Taylor (8)	Philips Arena; 15,266	20–47
68	March 13	Oklahoma City	L 107–119	Taurean Prince (25)	John Collins (9)	Dennis Schroder (8)	Philips Arena; 16,739	20–48
69	March 15	Charlotte	L 117–129	Taurean Prince (22)	Taurean Prince (10)	Dennis Schroder (8)	Philips Arena; 14,486	20–49
70	March 17	@ Milwaukee	L 117–122	Taurean Prince (38)	John Collins (12)	Dennis Schroder (9)	Bradley Center; 18,717	20–50
71	March 20	@ Utah	W 99–94	Dennis Schroder (41)	Dewayne Dedmon (15)	Dennis Schroder (7)	Vivint Smart Home Arena; 18,306	21–50
72	March 22	@ Sacramento	L 90–105	Isaiah Taylor (18)	Dewayne Dedmon (10)	Lee, Prince (4)	Golden 1 Center; 17,583	21–51
73	March 23	@ Golden State	L 94–106	Taurean Prince (20)	Dewayne Dedmon (11)	Dennis Schroder (7)	Oracle Arena; 19,596	21–52
74	March 25	@ Houston	L 99–118	Taurean Prince (28)	John Collins (10)	Josh Magette (5)	Toyota Center; 18,055	21–53
75	March 28	@ Minnesota	L 114–126	Mike Muscala (24)	Dewayne Dedmon (11)	Isaiah Taylor (8)	Target Center; 16,183	21–54
76	March 30	Philadelphia	L 91–101	Damion Lee (20)	Dewayne Dedmon (15)	Isaiah Taylor (7)	Philips Arena; 16,579	21–55

April : 3–3 (home: 1–2; road: 2–1)

Game	Date	Team	Score	High points	High rebounds	High assists	Location Attendance	Record
77	April 1	Orlando	W 94–88	Isaiah Taylor (19)	John Collins (11)	Tyler Dorsey (5)	Philips Arena; 13,587	22–55
78	April 3	@ Miami	L 98–101	Tyler Dorsey (18)	John Collins (10)	Isaiah Taylor (9)	American Airlines Arena; 19,600	22–56
79	April 4	Miami	L 86–115	Taurean Prince (20)	Collins, Dedmon (8)	Collins, Prince (4)	Philips Arena; 16,696	22–57
80	April 6	@ Washington	W 103–97	Taurean Prince (23)	Dewayne Dedmon (14)	Collins, Prince (5)	Capital One Arena; 19,557	23–57
81	April 8	@ Boston	W 112–106	Taurean Prince (33)	Lee, Prince (8)	Isaiah Taylor (6)	TD Garden; 18,624	24–57
82	April 10	Philadelphia	L 113–121	Taurean Prince (27)	John Collins (9)	DeAndre' Bembry (7)	Philips Arena; 15,673	24–58

2017–18 season schedule

== Player statistics ==
Player	Pos.	GP	GS	MP	Reb.	Ast.	Stl.	Blk.	Pts.
Luke Babbitt^{†}	SF	37	9	570	81	26	7	5	226
Kent Bazemore	SG	65	65	1,789	248	228	100	45	836
Marco Belinelli^{‡}	SG	52	1	1,210	100	103	46	3	591
DeAndre' Bembry	SF	26	3	455	72	49	21	12	136
Nicolás Brussino	SF	4	0	10	3	0	0	0	0
Tyler Cavanaugh^{≠}	PF	39	1	518	127	27	9	4	183
Antonius Cleveland^{≠}	SG	4	0	42	4	0	1	1	13
John Collins	PF	74	26	1,785	541	98	47	80	777
Dewayne Dedmon	C	62	46	1,542	489	90	40	51	617
Malcolm Delaney	PG	54	3	1,014	100	163	35	6	338
Tyler Dorsey	SG	56	5	974	130	79	17	5	405
Jeremy Evans^{≠}	SF	1	0	5	1	0	0	0	2
Ersan İlyasova^{‡}	PF	46	40	1,175	251	51	44	17	501
Damion Lee^{≠}	SG	15	11	404	71	29	19	1	161
Josh Magette	PG	18	0	216	19	57	8	1	46
Jaylen Morris^{≠}	SG	6	0	98	16	7	2	1	28
Mike Muscala	C	53	7	1,060	230	51	31	27	405
Miles Plumlee	C	55	35	918	228	45	17	30	237
Taurean Prince	SF	82	82	2,464	389	214	85	42	1,158
Dennis Schröder	PG	67	67	2,078	208	417	72	6	1,301
Isaiah Taylor	PG	67	9	1,167	94	206	34	10	445
Andrew White^{≠}	SF	15	0	209	34	6	3	1	69

After all games.
^{‡}Waived during the season
^{†}Traded during the season
^{≠}Acquired during the season

== Transactions ==
=== Overview ===
Players Added

Via draft Via free agency Via trade

Players Lost

Via free agency

=== Trades ===
June 20, 2017	To Atlanta Hawks Miles Plumlee; Marco Belinelli; 41st pick in the 2017 NBA draft	To Charlotte Hornets Dwight Howard; 31st pick in the 2017 NBA draft
June 28, 2017	To Atlanta Hawks Cash considerations	To Houston Rockets Ryan Kelly
July 6, 2017	To Atlanta Hawks Jamal Crawford; Diamond Stone; 2018 First Round Pick (from Los Angeles)	To Los Angeles Clippers Danilo Gallinari
July 6, 2017	To Denver Nuggets 2019 Second Round Pick (from Atlanta)	

=== Free agents ===
==== Re-signed ====
Player	Signed
Ersan İlyasova	1 Year, $6 Million
Mike Muscala	2 Year, $10 Million

==== Additions ====
Player	Signed	Former team
Dewayne Dedmon	2 Year, $14 Million	San Antonio Spurs
Luke Babbitt	1 Year, $1,974,159	Miami Heat
Tyler Cavanaugh	Two-way contract	George Washington Colonials / Erie BayHawks
Josh Magette	Two-way contract	Los Angeles D-Fenders (G League)
Quinn Cook		New Orleans Pelicans

==== Subtractions ====
Player	Reason left	New team
Dwight Howard	Traded	Charlotte Hornets
Ryan Kelly	Traded	Houston Rockets
Mike Dunleavy Jr.	Waived	
Tim Hardaway Jr.	Signed	New York Knicks
José Calderón	Signed	Cleveland Cavaliers
Thabo Sefolosha	Signed	Utah Jazz
Nicolás Brussino	Waived	CB Gran Canaria
