= Andrew White (basketball) =

American basketball player (born 1993)

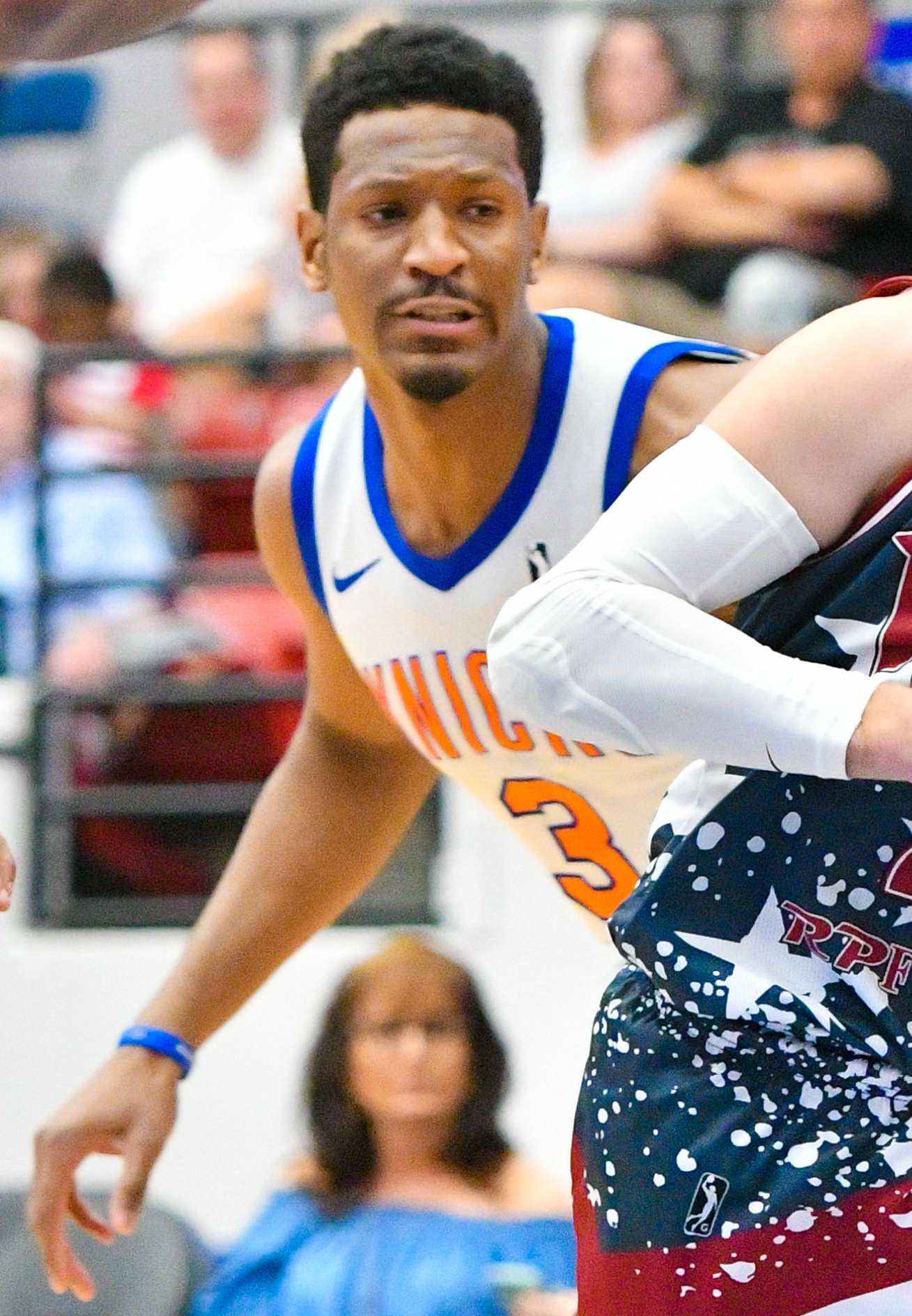
- White with the Westchester Knicks in 2020

Personal information
- Born: June 16, 1993 (age 33) Richmond, Virginia, U.S.
- Listed height: 6 ft 7 in (2.01 m)
- Listed weight: 210 lb (95 kg)

Career information
- High school: The Miller School (Charlottesville, Virginia)
- College: Kansas (2012–2014); Nebraska (2015–2016); Syracuse (2016–2017)
- NBA draft: 2017: undrafted
- Playing career: 2017–2024
- Position: Small forward

Career history
- 2017–2018: Maine Red Claws
- 2018: Atlanta Hawks
- 2018: →Erie BayHawks
- 2018–2019: Maine Red Claws
- 2019–2021: Westchester Knicks
- 2021–2022: Büyükçekmece Basketbol
- 2022–2023: Brisbane Bullets
- 2023: Northside Wizards
- 2024: Al-Rayyan
- 2024: Panteras de Miranda

Career highlights
- Third-team All-ACC (2017)
- Stats at NBA.com
- Stats at Basketball Reference

Andrew Jackson White III (born June 16, 1993) is an American former professional basketball player. He played in college for the Kansas Jayhawks, Nebraska Cornhuskers, and Syracuse Orange.

== College career ==
White began his collegiate career at Kansas and played sparingly during his two seasons with the Jayhawks, averaging just 2.2 points per game as a freshman and 2.4 as a sophomore. He transferred to Nebraska and sat out a season. In his redshirt junior year, he averaged 16.6 points and 5.9 rebounds per game for the Cornhuskers, shooting 41.2 percent from behind the arc.

After graduating, White played a postgrad year for the Syracuse Orange, leading the team in scoring with 18.5 points per game. He made a school-high 112 three-pointers that season, breaking Gerry McNamara's record of 107. White was named to the Third Team All-ACC.

== Professional career ==
=== Maine Red Claws (2017–2018) ===
After going undrafted in the 2017 NBA draft, White played in the Summer League with the Cleveland Cavaliers. In August 2017, he signed a partially guaranteed contract with the Boston Celtics. However, he was released by the Celtics on October 12. He joined the Celtics' NBA G League affiliate the Maine Red Claws and scored 37 points in his debut.

=== Atlanta Hawks (2018) ===
On January 15, 2018, White signed a two-way contract with the Atlanta Hawks. He split the rest of the 2017–18 NBA season with the Hawks and their G League affiliate the Erie BayHawks. In his NBA debut on February 14, 2018, he scored 15 points in a 104–98 loss to the Detroit Pistons.

=== Return to the Red Claws (2018–2019) ===
After initially signing with Afyon Belediye S.K. in Turkey, White re-joined the Maine Red Claws for the 2018–19 season.

=== Westchester Knicks (2019–2021) ===
White was included in the New York Knicks' roster for 2019 NBA Summer League. His G League rights were later acquired by the Westchester Knicks and he joined the team for the 2019–20 season. On November 13, 2019, he recorded a season-high 39 points to go along with seven assists and nine 3-pointers made in a 116–109 win over the Greensboro Swarm. He averaged 12.0 points and 4.1 rebounds per game for Westchester.

On December 12, 2020, White was signed and then immediately waived by the New York Knicks, He re-joined the Westchester Knicks and averaged 5.2 points and 2.5 rebounds per game in the G League hub season between February and March 2021.

=== Büyükçekmece Basketbol (2021–2022) ===
On July 26, 2021, White signed with Büyükçekmece Basketbol of the Basketbol Süper Ligi.

=== Brisbane Bullets (2022–2023) ===
On December 11, 2022, White signed with the Brisbane Bullets in Australia for the rest of the 2022–23 NBL season.

=== Northside Wizards (2023) ===
On February 27, 2023, White signed with the Northside Wizards of the NBL1 North.

== NBA career statistics ==
Legend
GP	Games played	GS	Games started	MPG	Minutes per game
FG%	Field goal percentage	3P%	3-point field goal percentage	FT%	Free throw percentage
RPG	Rebounds per game	APG	Assists per game	SPG	Steals per game
BPG	Blocks per game	PPG	Points per game	**Bold**	Career high

=== Regular season ===
Year	Team	GP	GS	MPG	FG%	3P%	FT%	RPG	APG	SPG	BPG	PPG
2017–18	Atlanta	15	0	13.9	.342	.367	.250	2.3	.4	.2	.1	4.6
Career		15	0	13.9	.342	.367	.250	2.3	.4	.2	.1	4.6
