= Kent Bazemore =

American basketball player (born 1989)

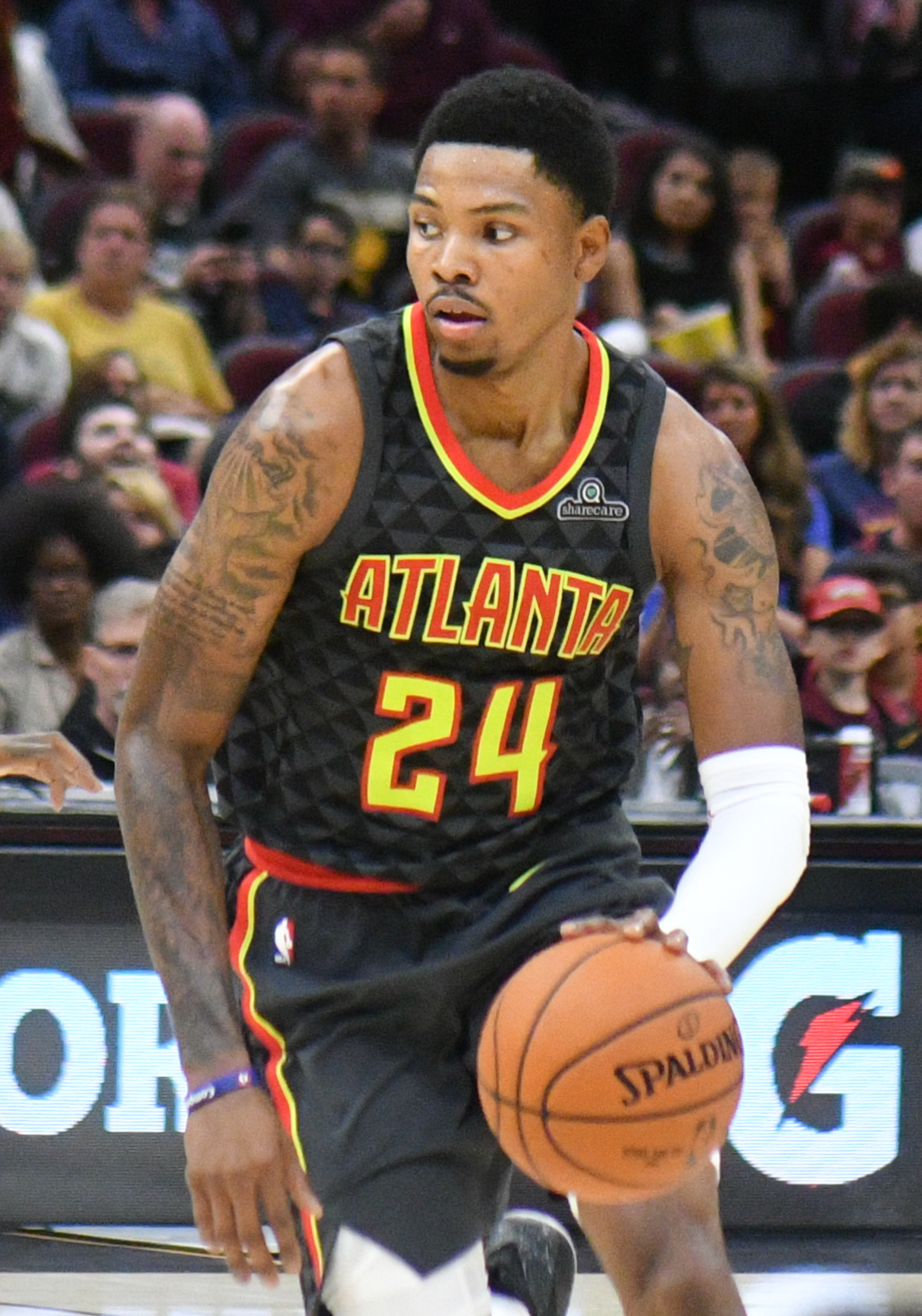
- Bazemore with the Atlanta Hawks in 2017

Personal information
- Born: July 1, 1989 (age 37) Kelford, North Carolina, U.S.
- Listed height: 6 ft 4 in (1.93 m)
- Listed weight: 195 lb (88 kg)

Career information
- High school: Bertie (Windsor, North Carolina)
- College: Old Dominion (2008–2012)
- NBA draft: 2012: undrafted
- Playing career: 2012–2025
- Position: Small forward / shooting guard
- Number: 24, 6, 20, 26, 9

Career history
- 2012–2014: Golden State Warriors
- 2012–2014: →Santa Cruz Warriors
- 2014: Los Angeles Lakers
- 2014–2019: Atlanta Hawks
- 2019–2020: Portland Trail Blazers
- 2020: Sacramento Kings
- 2020–2021: Golden State Warriors
- 2021–2022: Los Angeles Lakers
- 2024: Greensboro Swarm
- 2025: Capital City Go-Go

Career highlights
- Lefty Driesell Award (2011); First-team All-CAA (2012); Second-team All-CAA (2011); 2× CAA Defensive Player of the Year (2011, 2012); 3× CAA All-Defensive Team (2010–2012); No. 24 retired by Old Dominion Monarchs
- Stats at NBA.com
- Stats at Basketball Reference

Kenneth Lamont Bazemore Jr. (born July 1, 1989) is an American former professional basketball player, who played for ten seasons in the National Basketball Association (NBA). As a junior at Old Dominion University in 2010–11, Bazemore won the Lefty Driesell Award, an award given to the best defensive player in college basketball.

== College career ==
Bazemore, a 6'5" shooting guard from Kelford, North Carolina, redshirted the 2007–08 season. As a freshman in 2008–09, Bazemore was a key rotation player for the Monarchs, averaging 4.5 points and 3.1 rebounds per game as ODU won the 2009 CollegeInsider.com Tournament. As a sophomore, he moved into the starting lineup and was a driving force for the Colonial Athletic Association regular-season and tournament champions. Bazemore averaged 8.4 points, 3.4 assists, 4.2 rebounds and 1.9 steals per game. He was named to the CAA All-Defensive team that season.

As a junior, Old Dominion repeated as tournament champions and made the 2011 NCAA tournament, losing to eventual national runner-up Butler 60–58. Bazemore averaged career highs of 12.3 points, 5.1 rebounds and 2.2 steals per game and was named the CAA Defensive player of the year and second team All-Conference. He also gained national recognition, receiving the Lefty Driesell Award given to the nation's top defensive player.

Prior to the 2011–12 season Bazemore was named the CAA preseason player of the year. He was also named a preseason Mid-Major All-American by collegeinsider.com. In his final season at ODU, Bazemore averaged 15.4 points, 6.1 rebounds and 3.1 assists per game.

At halftime of a game against state rival VCU on December 10, 2016, Old Dominion retired Bazemore's #24 Monarchs jersey and inducted him into the school's athletic Ring of Honor.

Bazemore earned two college degrees from Old Dominion, in Human Services and Criminal Justice.

== Professional career ==
=== Golden State Warriors (2012–2014) ===
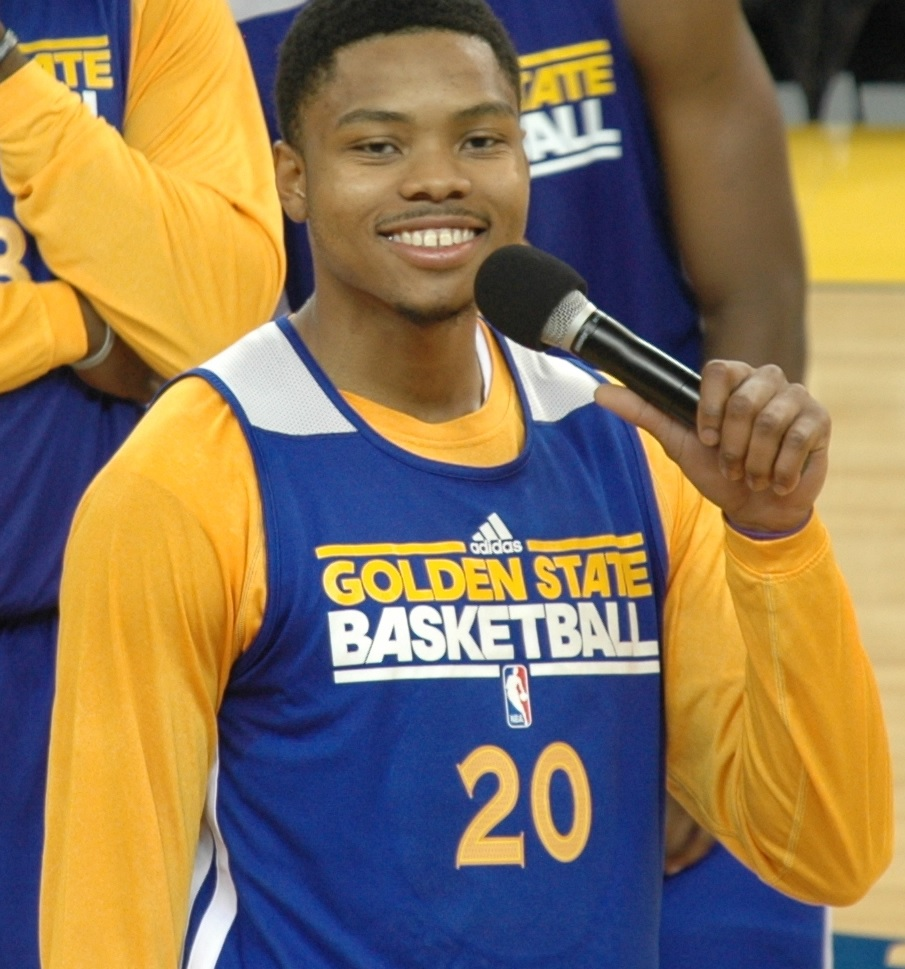
Bazemore with the Golden State Warriors in 2012

After going undrafted in the 2012 NBA draft, Bazemore joined the Oklahoma City Thunder for the Orlando Summer League and the Golden State Warriors for the Las Vegas Summer League. On July 26, he signed with Golden State. During his rookie season, he was assigned multiple times to the Santa Cruz Warriors of the NBA Development League. On March 15, 2013, he scored a season-high 14 points in a loss to the Chicago Bulls.

In July 2013, Bazemore re-joined Golden State for the 2013 NBA Summer League, where he was named a Summer League All-Tournament Team Recipient. The Warriors won the Summer League championship. On February 1, 2014, he was reassigned to the Santa Cruz Warriors. He was recalled by Golden State on February 2, reassigned on February 11, and recalled again February 12.

=== Los Angeles Lakers (2014) ===
On February 19, 2014, Bazemore was traded, along with MarShon Brooks, to the Los Angeles Lakers in exchange for Steve Blake. On March 4, he tied his then career high of 23 points in a loss to the New Orleans Pelicans. On April 7, he was ruled out of the rest of the season after suffering a torn tendon in his right foot.

=== Atlanta Hawks (2014–2019) ===
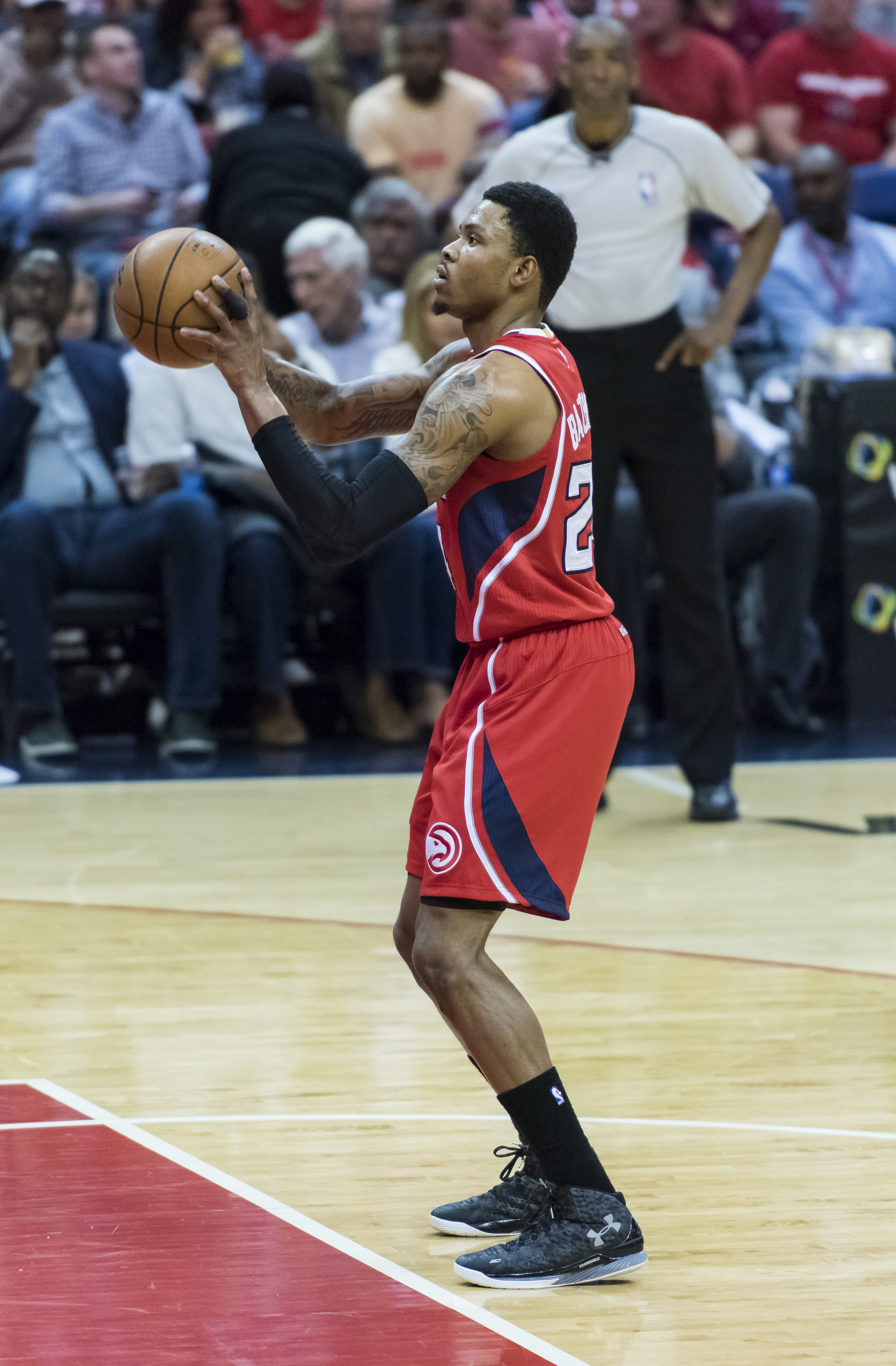
Bazemore taking a free-throw for Atlanta in a game against Washington in 2015

On September 23, 2014, Bazemore signed with the Atlanta Hawks. On March 28, 2015, he scored a season-high 20 points in a 115–100 loss to the Charlotte Hornets.

On November 7, 2015, Bazemore scored a career-high 25 points in a 114–99 win over the Washington Wizards. On December 14, 2015, he set a new career high with 28 points in a 100–88 loss to the Miami Heat.

On July 7, 2016, Bazemore re-signed with the Hawks on a four-year, $70 million contract. On November 8, he scored a season-high 25 points against the Cleveland Cavaliers. On January 23, 2017, Bazemore scored 25 points for a second time against the Los Angeles Clippers.

On March 2, 2018, Bazemore scored a then career-high 29 points in a 114–109 loss to the Golden State Warriors.

On October 24, 2018, Bazemore scored a career-high 32 points in a 111–104 win over the Dallas Mavericks. On December 26, 2018, he tied a career high with 32 points in a 129–121 loss to the Indiana Pacers.

On April 12, 2019, Bazemore exercised his $19.2 million player option for the 2019–20 season.

=== Portland Trail Blazers (2019–2020) ===
On June 24, 2019, Bazemore was traded to the Portland Trail Blazers in exchange for Evan Turner. He made his debut for the team on October 23, logging four points and five steals in a 100–108 loss to the Denver Nuggets.

=== Sacramento Kings (2020) ===
On January 20, 2020, Bazemore was traded, alongside Anthony Tolliver and two future second-round picks, to the Sacramento Kings in exchange for Trevor Ariza, Wenyen Gabriel and Caleb Swanigan. Bazemore made his debut for the team two days later, scoring seven points in a 106–127 loss to the Detroit Pistons.

=== Return to Golden State (2020–2021) ===
On December 1, 2020, Bazemore signed a one-year contract with the Golden State Warriors to join the team for a second stint. He made his debut for the team on December 22, logging two points, two rebounds and two assists in a 99–125 loss to the Brooklyn Nets. On February 17, 2021, Bazemore scored a season-high 26 points, alongside eight rebounds, three assists and three steals, in a 120–112 overtime win over the Miami Heat.

=== Return to the Lakers (2021–2022) ===
On August 6, 2021, Bazemore signed with the Los Angeles Lakers. On January 28, 2022, he scored a season-high 13 points in a 114–117 loss to the Charlotte Hornets.

On September 21, 2022, Bazemore signed with the Sacramento Kings, but was waived on October 13.

On August 8, 2023, the Golden State Warriors held a free agent workout with Bazemore.

=== Greensboro Swarm (2024) ===
On January 28, 2024, Bazemore joined the Greensboro Swarm. However, he was waived on November 19.

=== Capital City Go-Go (2025) ===
On March 24, 2025, the Capital City Go-Go announced that they had acquired Bazemore.

== Career statistics ==
Legend
GP	Games played	GS	Games started	MPG	Minutes per game
FG%	Field goal percentage	3P%	3-point field goal percentage	FT%	Free throw percentage
RPG	Rebounds per game	APG	Assists per game	SPG	Steals per game
BPG	Blocks per game	PPG	Points per game	**Bold**	Career high

=== NBA ===
==== Regular season ====
Year	Team	GP	GS	MPG	FG%	3P%	FT%	RPG	APG	SPG	BPG	PPG
2012–13	Golden State	61	0	4.4	.371	.294	.614	.4	.4	.3	.1	2.0
2013–14	Golden State	44	0	6.1	.371	.256	.528	.9	.5	.3	.1	2.3
2013–14	L.A. Lakers	23	15	**28.0**	**.451**	.371	.644	3.3	3.1	1.3	.3	**13.1**
2014–15	Atlanta	**75**	10	17.7	.426	.364	.600	3.0	1.0	.7	.4	5.2
2015–16	Atlanta	**75**	**68**	27.8	.441	.357	**.815**	**5.1**	2.3	1.3	.5	11.6
2016–17	Atlanta	73	64	26.9	.409	.346	.708	3.2	2.4	1.3	**.7**	11.0
2017–18	Atlanta	65	65	27.5	.420	.394	.796	3.8	**3.5**	**1.5**	**.7**	12.9
2018–19	Atlanta	67	35	24.5	.402	.320	.726	3.9	2.3	1.3	.6	11.6
2019–20	Portland	43	21	25.8	.347	.327	.806	4.0	2.3	1.4	.7	7.9
2019–20	Sacramento	25	0	23.1	.418	.384	.733	4.9	1.3	1.2	.4	10.3
2020–21	Golden State	67	18	19.9	.449	**.408**	.692	3.4	1.6	1.0	.5	7.2
2021–22	L.A. Lakers	39	14	14.0	.324	.363	.765	1.8	.9	.6	.2	3.4
Career		657	310	20.6	.413	.356	.724	3.2	1.8	1.0	.5	8.2

==== Playoffs ====
Year	Team	GP	GS	MPG	FG%	3P%	FT%	RPG	APG	SPG	BPG	PPG
2013	Golden State	9	0	1.8	.125	.000	.000	.6	.2	.1	.0	.2
2015	Atlanta	**16**	2	18.9	**.423**	.214	.677	3.3	.8	.7	.6	5.4
2016	Atlanta	10	**10**	**32.5**	.364	.262	.682	**6.6**	1.9	**1.4**	.6	**11.9**
2017	Atlanta	6	0	25.0	.396	**.292**	**.714**	3.8	**3.3**	.7	**.8**	9.8
Career		41	12	19.4	.379	.254	.648	3.6	1.3	.8	.5	6.5

=== College ===
Year	Team	GP	GS	MPG	FG%	3P%	FT%	RPG	APG	SPG	BPG	PPG
2008–09	Old Dominion	35	9	16.3	.433	.265	.429	3.1	1.5	.9	.2	4.5
2009–10	Old Dominion	**36**	29	26.7	**.486**	.300	.486	4.2	**3.4**	1.9	.5	8.4
2010–11	Old Dominion	34	**33**	30.7	.481	**.408**	**.662**	5.1	2.9	**2.2**	**.9**	12.3
2011–12	Old Dominion	35	32	**31.5**	.407	.321	.632	**6.1**	3.1	2.1	.3	**15.4**
Career		140	103	26.3	.447	.334	.581	4.6	2.7	1.8	.5	10.1

== Personal life ==
Bazemore is a member of the Pi Kappa Alpha fraternity. While with the Warriors, Bazemore was noted for his celebrations while on the team's bench, which became a fixture on YouTube and were included in the NBA 2K14 video game. Kent married Samantha Serpe in Asheville, North Carolina in 2017; they were divorced in 2024.

=== Role in Stephen Curry endorsement contract ===
In March 2016, ESPN writer Ethan Sherwood Strauss published a story about how Under Armour successfully signed away Stephen Curry from Nike in the 2013 offseason, and revealed that Bazemore played a significant role in the signing.

During the 2012 offseason, when Bazemore was an undrafted rookie trying to make the Warriors roster, his agent contacted Under Armour and convinced the company to take a chance on Bazemore as an endorser, noting that rising Warriors stars Curry and Klay Thompson had endorsement deals set to expire in the near future. Under Armour signed Bazemore to a deal, mainly providing massive amounts of branded merchandise—enough to allow Bazemore to provide clothing to several Warriors staff members. Once Bazemore made the team, he and his fellow North Carolinian Curry bonded over their common origins and shared work ethic. Bazemore then sold Curry on signing with Under Armour, which he did following several missteps by Nike. According to Strauss, "UA owes him [Bazemore] now. Big time." As a result, Bazemore has a six-figure deal with the company, an unusually high amount for a player of his stature in the league. The company also recognized Bazemore's role in luring Curry by signing an apparel deal with Old Dominion for seven times the amount that the school had previously received from Nike. His deal with Under Armour enabled him to provide most of the funding for ODU's new basketball practice facility.
