= H. W. Bessemer =

British philatelist

- Born: Henry William Bessemer; 7 November 1865
- Died: 26 April 1956 (aged 90)
- Occupation: Philatelist

Henry William Bessemer (7 November 1865 – 26 April 1956) was a British philatelist who signed the Roll of Distinguished Philatelists in 1950.

Bessemer was an expert in the stamps of France, particularly the tête-bêche, and Bordeaux and Semeuse issues. In 1939 he won the Royal Philatelic Society London's Tilleard Medal. His collection was shown, hors concours, at the London International Stamp Exhibition 1950.
