= Miami Heat all-time roster =

Professional basketball team

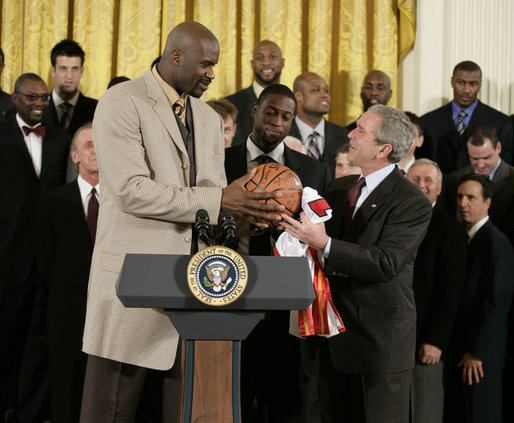
Shaquille O'Neal (left) and Dwyane Wade (center), along with the 2005–06 Miami Heat players and staff, presented United States President George W. Bush (right) with an autographed basketball at the White House.

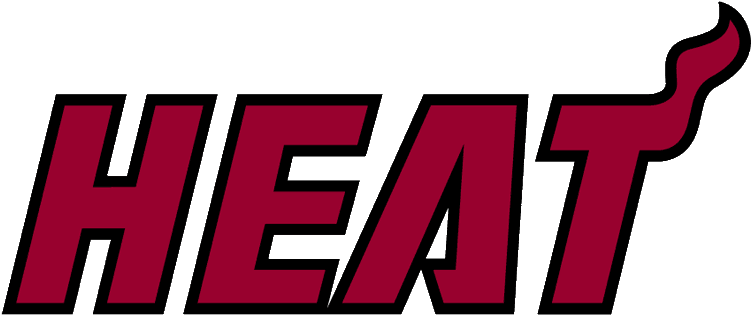
Miami Heat logo currently.

The Miami Heat is an American professional basketball team based in Miami. They play in the Southeast Division of the Eastern Conference in the National Basketball Association (NBA). The team joined the NBA in 1988 as an expansion team, and won the NBA championship in 2006, 2012 and 2013. The team played its home games at the Miami Arena until 2000, and have played their home games at Kaseya Center since then. The Heat is owned by Micky Arison. Its current staff consists of Pat Riley as team president and Erik Spoelstra as head coach.

The Heat started building their roster by selecting players in the 1988 NBA expansion draft and 1988 NBA draft. Since then, 300 players have appeared in at least one game for the franchise. Dwyane Wade is the most successful player in Heat history. His achievements include Finals Most Valuable Player Award in 2006, All-Star Game Most Valuable Player Award in 2010, 11 consecutive All-Star Game selections and eight All-NBA Teams selections. Alonzo Mourning, the franchise's first ever All-Star, won two Defensive Player of the Year Awards and was selected to five All-Star Games and two All-NBA Teams. LeBron James, who played four years with the Heat, won the Most Valuable Player Award in 2012 and 2013, the Finals Most Valuable Player Award in 2012 and 2013, and was selected to four consecutive All-Star Games and four consecutive All-NBA Teams. Tim Hardaway, Shaquille O'Neal, and Jimmy Butler are the only other Heat players who have been selected to both the All-Star Game and the All-NBA Team. Anthony Mason, Chris Bosh, Goran Dragić, Bam Adebayo, and Tyler Herro are the only other Heat players who have been selected to the All-Star Game. Two Heat players have won the NBA Most Improved Player Award: Rony Seikaly in 1990 and Isaac Austin in 1997. Ten Heat players were selected to the All-Rookie Team. Mourning, Shaquille O'Neal and Gary Payton, who played two seasons for the Heat and was part of the Heat championship team in 2006, have been inducted to the Basketball Hall of Fame. Ray Allen was inducted into the Naismith Memorial Basketball Hall of Fame in 2018, while Chris Bosh was inducted into the Naismith Memorial Basketball Hall of Fame in 2021.

Udonis Haslem, who has played for the Heat since he entered the league in 2003, is the franchise's longest-serving player. Haslem has recorded more rebounds than any other Heat players. Wade has played more games, more minutes, scored more points, recorded more assists and more steals than any other Heat players. He also led the franchise in field goals made and free throws made. Mourning, who played 11 seasons with the Heat, is the franchise's third longest-serving player. He has blocked more shots than any other Heat players. The Heat have seven retired jersey numbers: the number 3 worn by Dwyane Wade, the number 33 jersey worn by Alonzo Mourning, the number 10 jersey worn by Tim Hardaway, the number 1 jersey worn by Chris Bosh, the number 23 jersey worn by Michael Jordan, who has never played for the Heat, the number 40 worn by Udonis Haslem, and the number 32 jersey worn by Shaquille O'Neal. The Heat retired Jordan's number 23 jersey in April 2003 to honor Jordan's achievements and contributions in basketball. The Heat are the only NBA team other than the Chicago Bulls to have retired the number 23 jersey in honor of Jordan. Mourning had his number 33 jersey retired in March 2009, a year after he retired. Hardaway, who played six seasons with the Heat, had his number 10 jersey retired in October 2009.

== List ==
| Pos | G | Guard | F | Forward | C | Center |
| No | Jersey number | | | | | |
| Yrs | Number of seasons played with the Heat | | | | | |
| * | Denotes player who has been inducted to the Basketball Hall of Fame | | | | | |
| ^ | Denotes player who is currently on the Heat roster | | | | | |
| † | Denotes player who has spent their entire NBA career with the Heat | | | | | |
| ^{#} | Denotes jersey number that has been retired by the Heat | | | | | |

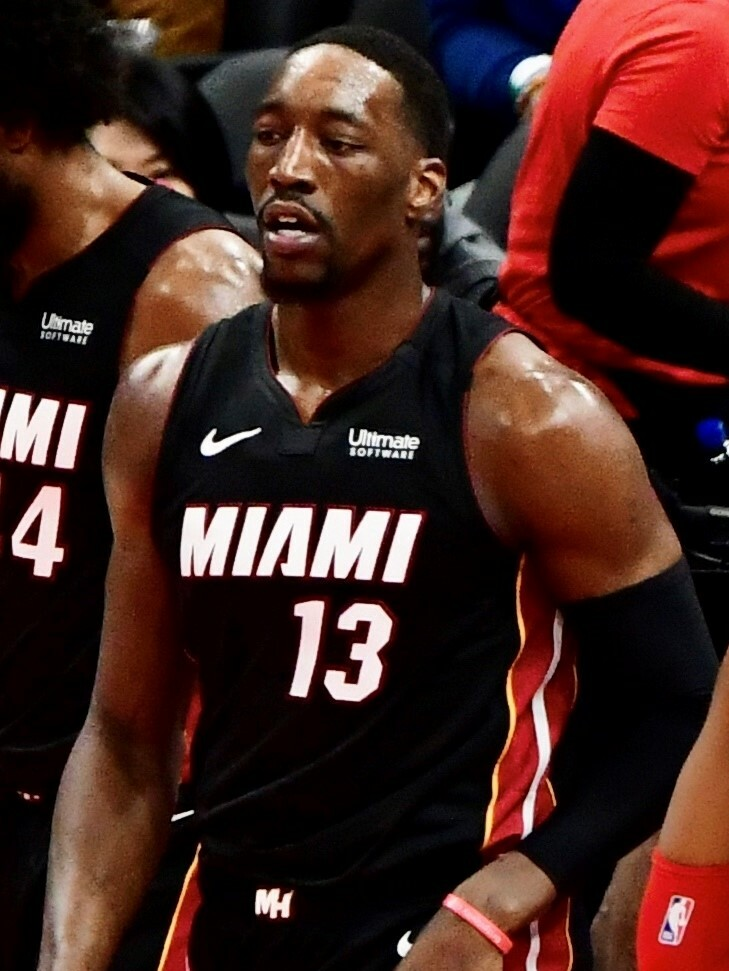
Bam Adebayo has played nine seasons with the Heat since being drafted in 2017.

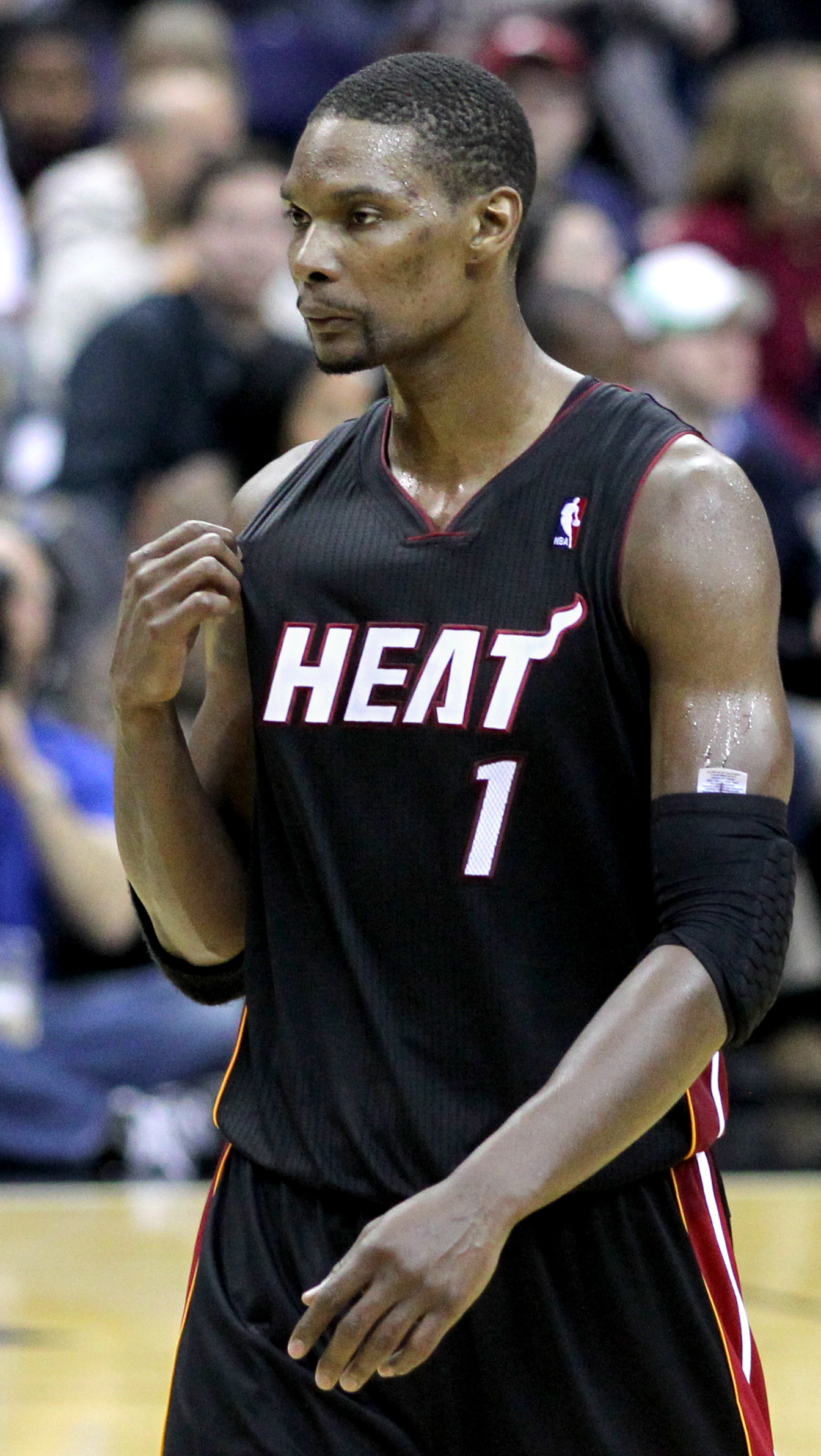
All-Star forward Chris Bosh joined the Heat in 2010.

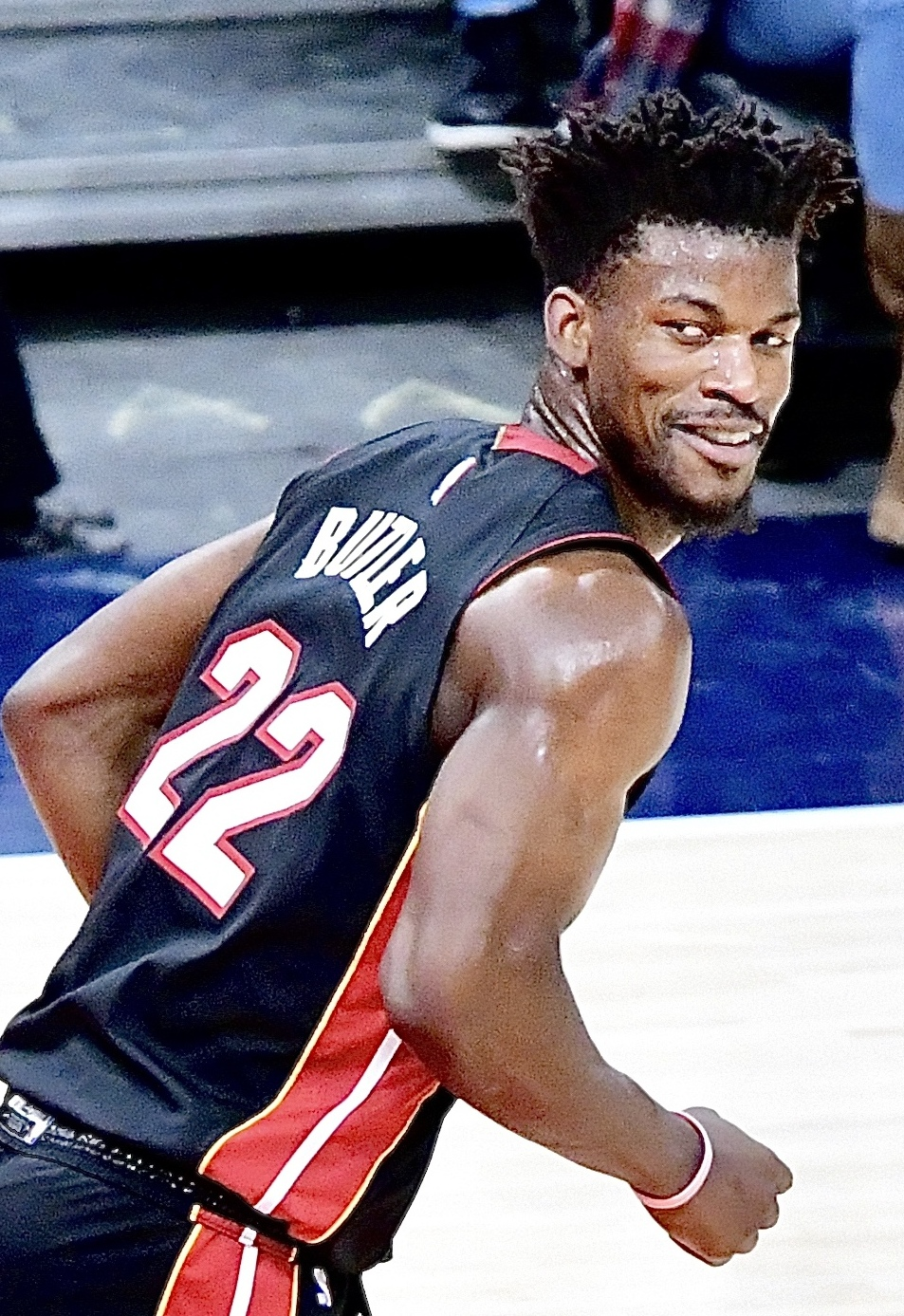
Jimmy Butler played six seasons with the Heat from 2019 to 2025.

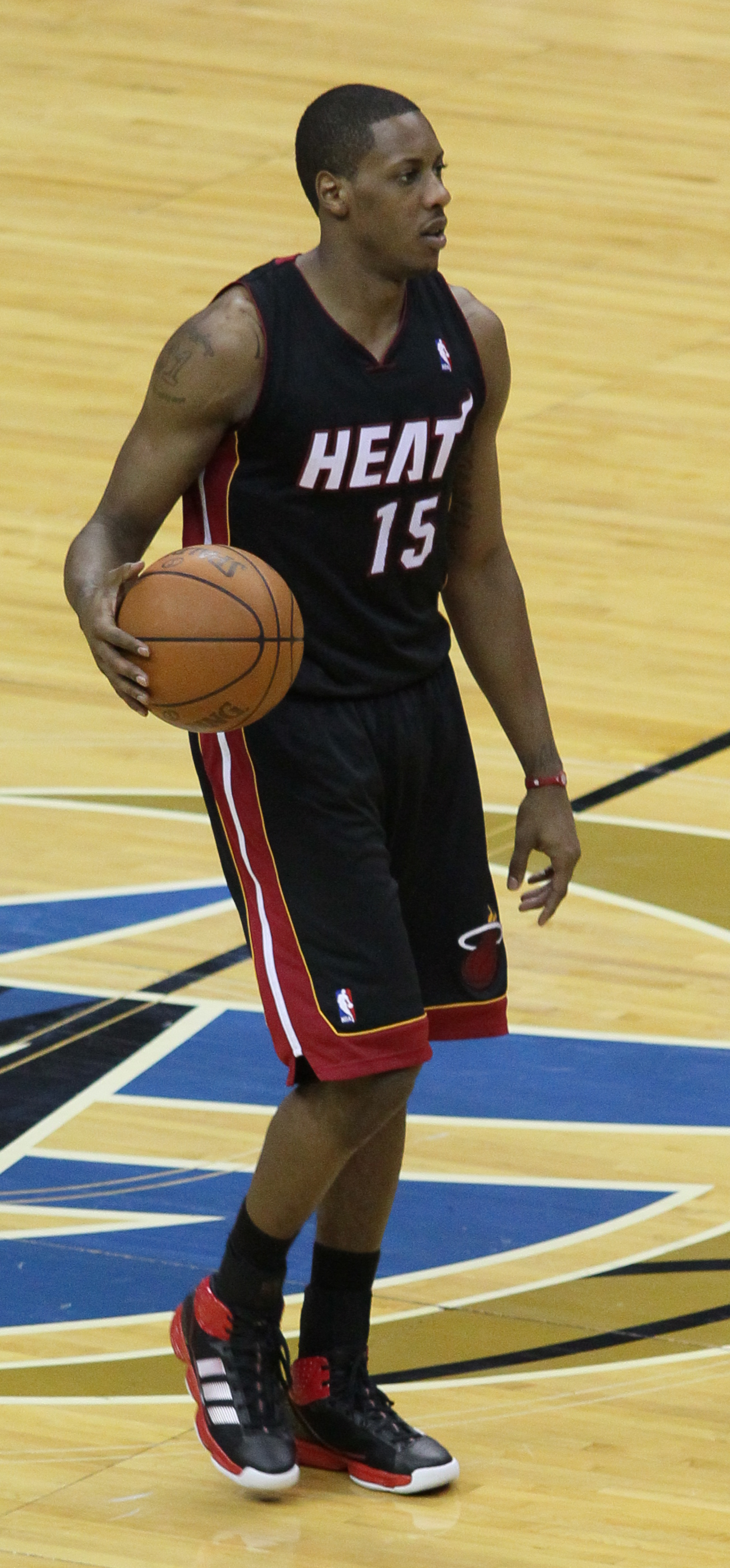
Mario Chalmers was the Heat starting point guard in two of their championship-winning seasons.

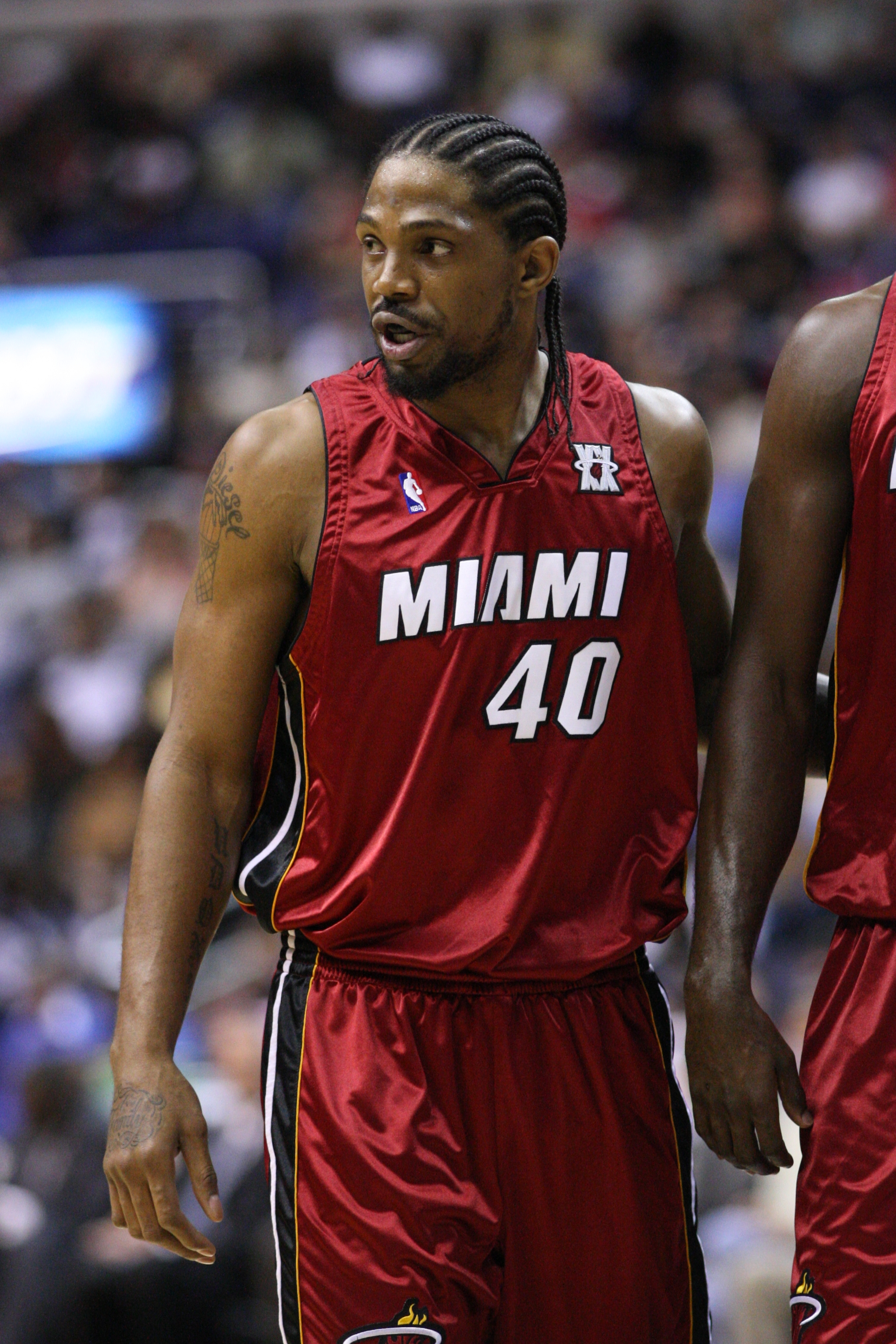
Udonis Haslem is the team's longest-serving player.

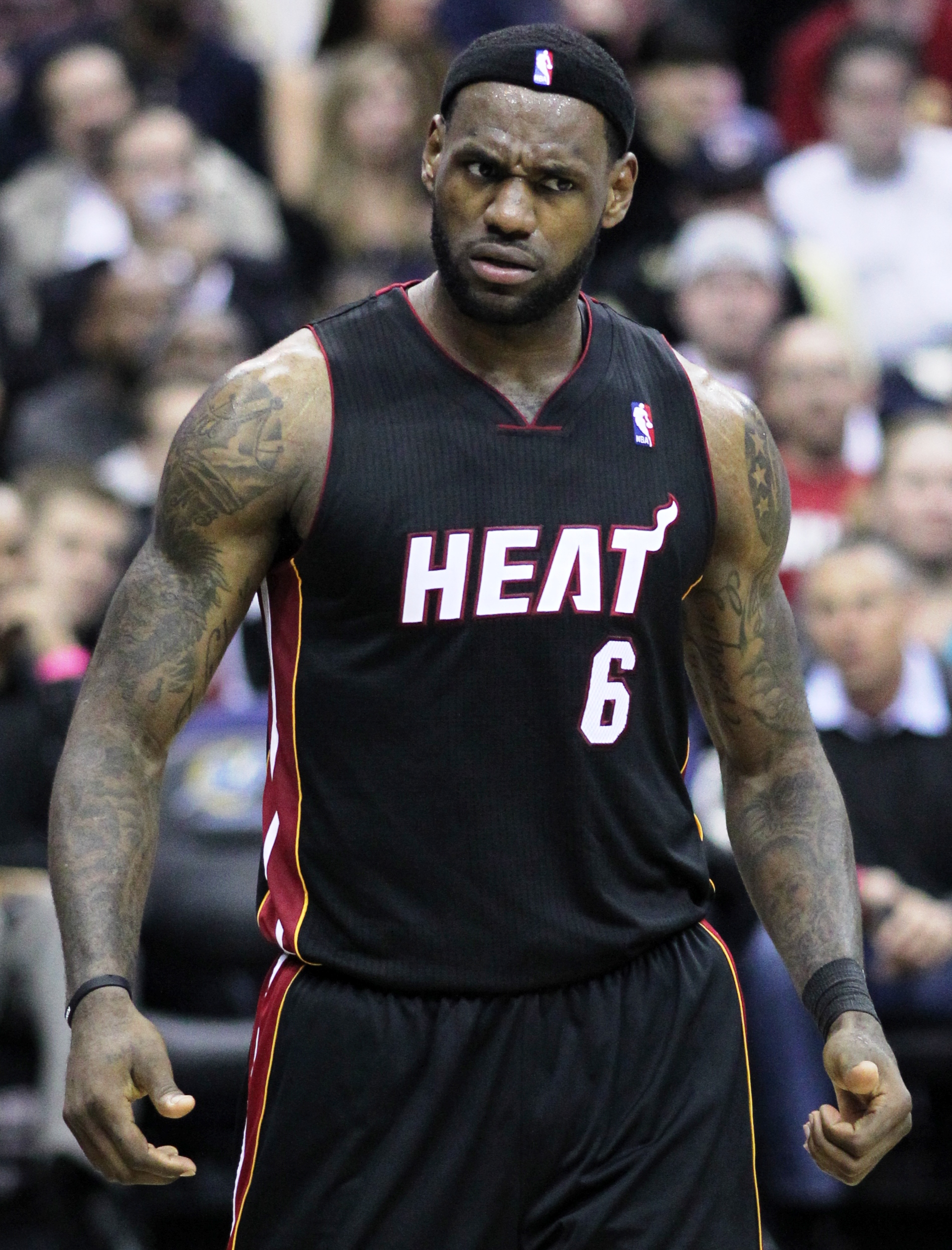
LeBron James won the NBA Most Valuable Player Award in 2012 and 2013.

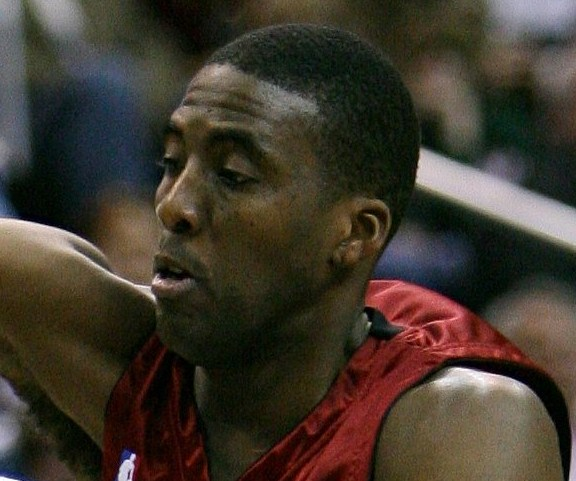
Eddie Jones played six seasons with the Heat in two separate stints.

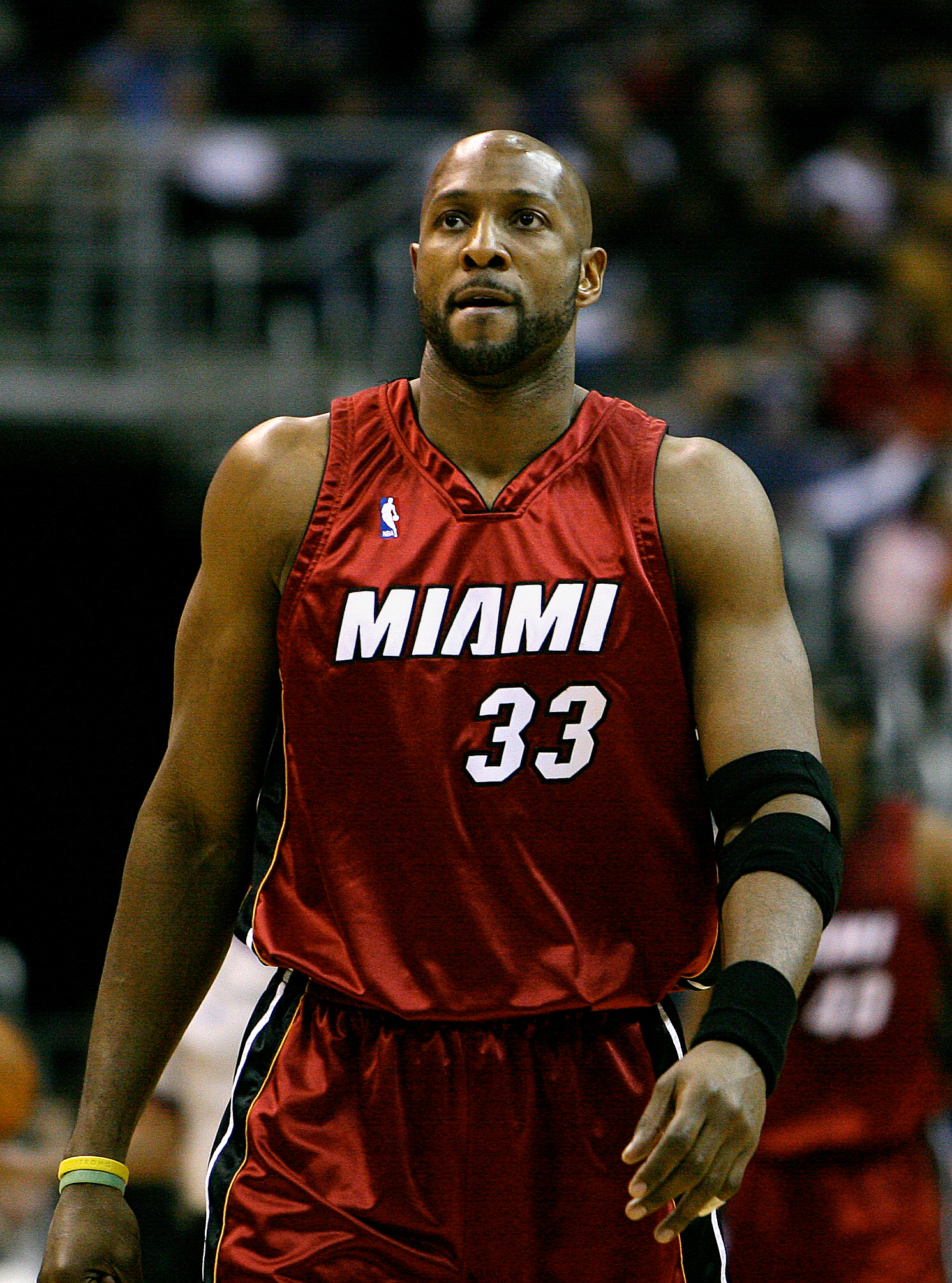
Alonzo Mourning, who had his number 33 jersey retired by the Heat, is the team's third longest-serving player.

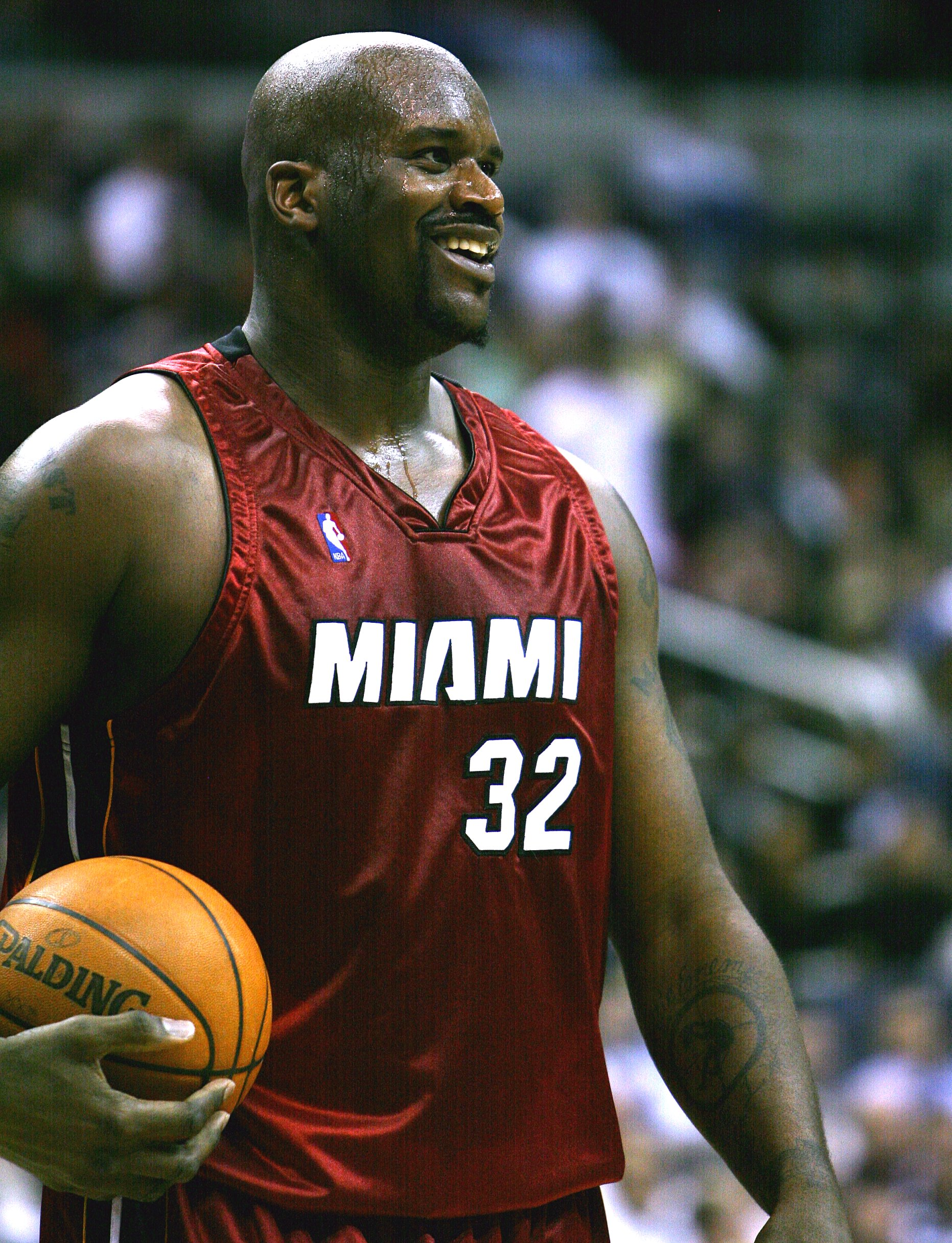
Shaquille O'Neal played four seasons with the Heat from 2004 to 2008.

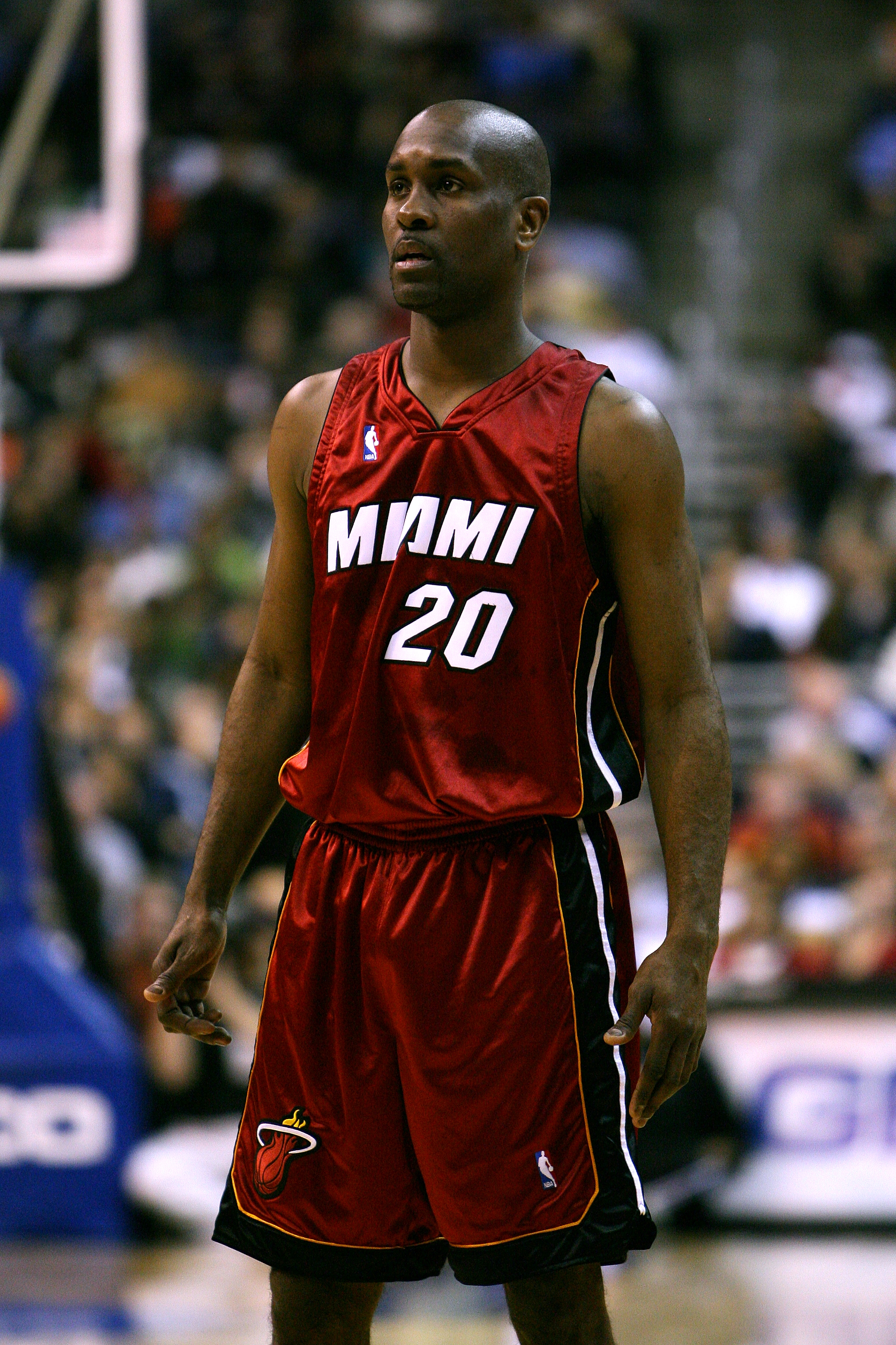
Gary Payton is the first Heat player to be inducted to the Basketball Hall of Fame.

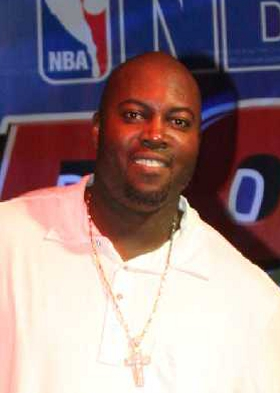
Glen Rice played six seasons with the Heat since he was drafted fourth in 1989.

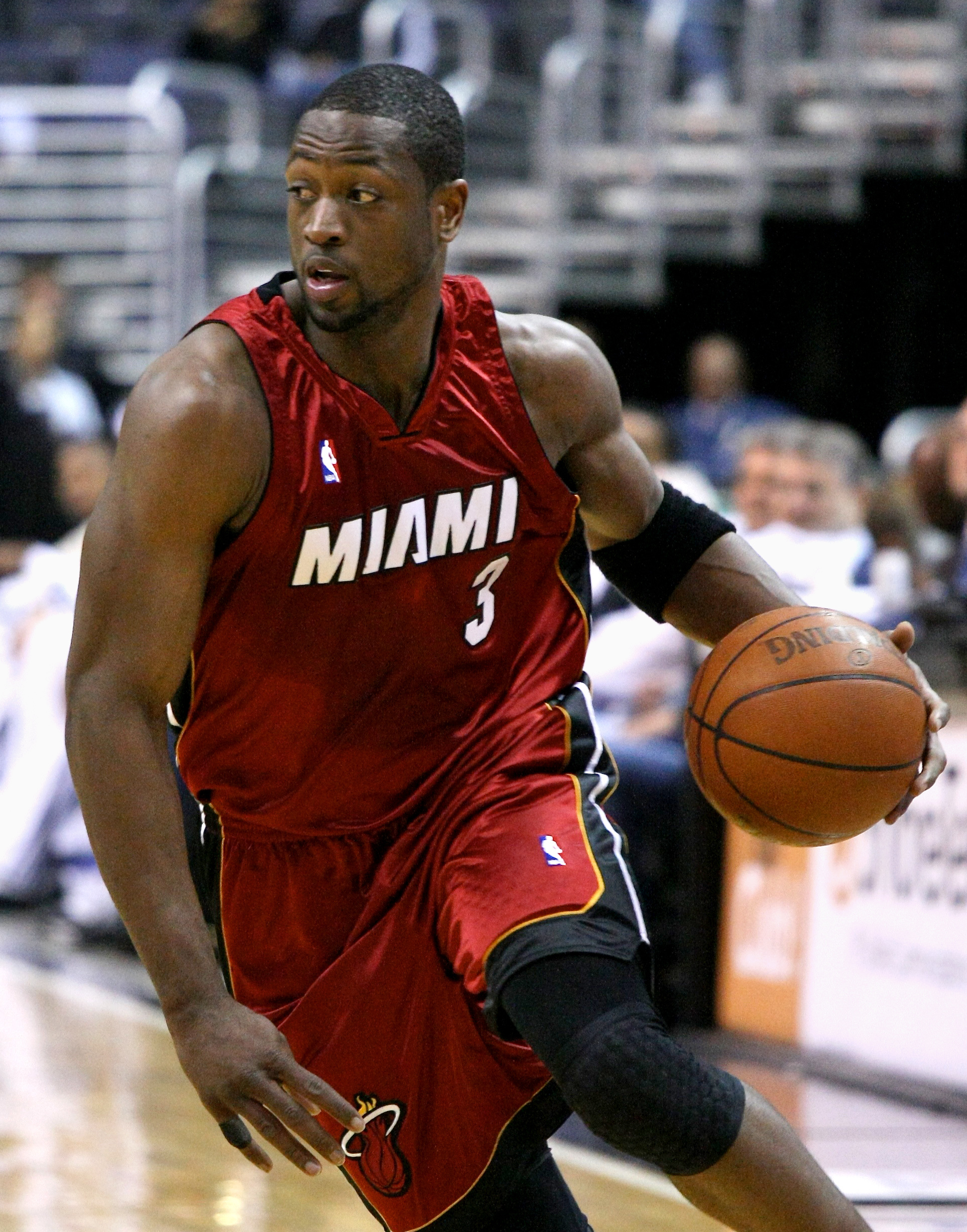
Dwyane Wade is one of the team's longest-serving players and also the most successful player in franchise history.

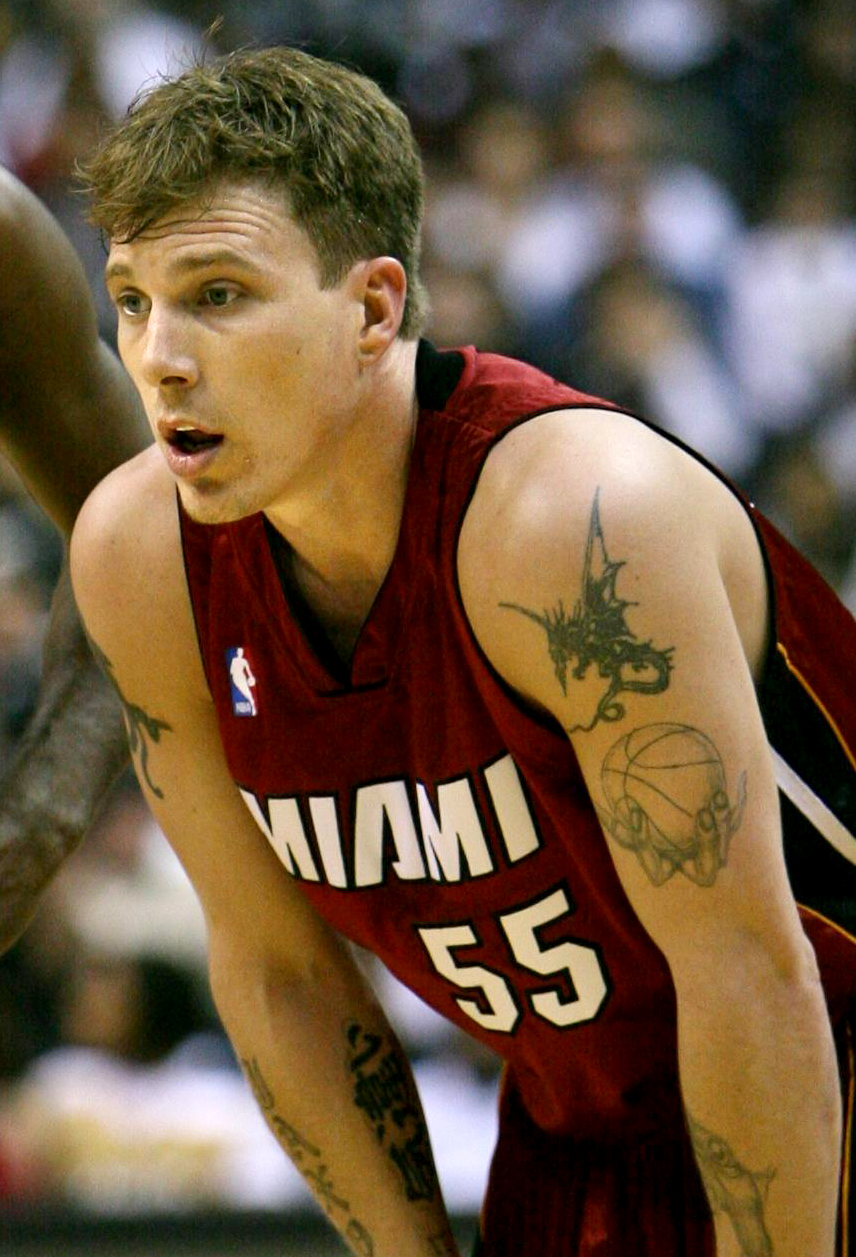
Jason Williams was the Heat starting point guard for three seasons.

| Player | Pos | No^{[a]} | Yrs | From^{[b]} | To^{[b]} | Notes and achievements^{[c]} | Ref. |
|---|---|---|---|---|---|---|---|
| Precious Achiuwa | F | 5 | 1 | 2020 | 2021 | | |
| Bam Adebayo^ | C | 13 | 9† | 2017 | present | • 3× NBA All-Star (2020, 2023, 2024) • NBA All-Defensive First Team (2024) • 4× NBA All-Defensive Second Team (2020, 2021, 2022, 2023) • NBA All-Star Skills Challenge champion (2020) • Kareem Abdul-Jabbar Social Justice Champion (2026) • Basketball at the 2020 Summer Olympics • Basketball at the 2024 Summer Olympics | |
| Blake Ahearn | G | 6 | 1 | 2008 | 2008 | | |
| Gary Alexander | F | 35 | 1 | 1993 | 1993 | | |
| Kyle Alexander | F/C | 17 | 1† | 2020 | 2020 | | |
| Malik Allen | F | 35 | 4 | 2001 | 2005 | | |
| Ray Allen* | G | 34 | 2 | 2012 | 2014 | • NBA champion (2013) • NBA 75th Anniversary Team | |
| Rafer Alston | G | 11 | 2 | 2003; 2010 | 2004; 2010 | | |
| Chris Andersen | F | 11 | 4 | 2013 | 2016 | • NBA champion (2013) | |
| Derek Anderson | G | 5 | 1 | 2006 | 2006 | • NBA champion (2006) | |
| Kyle Anderson | F | 20 | 1 | 2025 | 2025 | | |
| Ryan Anderson | F | 31 | 1 | 2019 | 2019 | | |
| Shandon Anderson | F/G | 49 | 2 | 2004 | 2006 | • NBA champion (2006) | |
| Willie Anderson | G/F | 35 | 1 | 1997 | 1997 | | |
| Joel Anthony | C | 50 | 7 | 2007 | 2014 | • 2× NBA champion (2012, 2013) | |
| Trevor Ariza | F | 0 / 8 | 1 | 2021 | 2021 | | |
| Carlos Arroyo | G | 8 | 2 | 2009 | 2011 | | |
| Keith Askins | G/F | 2 | 9† | 1990 | 1999 | | |
| Isaac Austin | C/F | 8 | 2 | 1996 | 1998 | • NBA Most Improved Player (1997) | |
| Luke Babbitt | F | 5 / 22 | 2 | 2016; 2018 | 2017; 2018 | | |
| Miloš Babić | F/C | 00 | 1 | 1991 | 1991 | | |
| Marcus Banks | G | 5 | 2 | 2008 | 2009 | | |
| Earl Barron | C/F | 30 | 3 | 2005 | 2008 | • NBA champion (2006) | |
| Brent Barry | G | 17 | 1 | 1998 | 1998 | | |
| Shane Battier | F | 31 | 3 | 2011 | 2014 | • 2× NBA champion (2012, 2013) • NBA Teammate of the Year (2014) | |
| Jerome Beasley | F | 24 | 1† | 2003 | 2004 | | |
| Michael Beasley | F | 8 / 30 | 4 | 2008; 2013; 2015 | 2010; 2014; 2015 | • NBA All-Rookie First Team (2009) | |
| Winston Bennett | F | 30 | 1 | 1992 | 1992 | | |
| Travis Best | G | 1 | 1 | 2002 | 2003 | | |
| Patrick Beverley | G | 12 | 1 | 2010 | 2010 | | |
| Mike Bibby | G | 0 | 1 | 2011 | 2011 | | |
| Nemanja Bjelica | F | 70 | 1 | 2021 | 2021 | | |
| Mark Blount | C | 15 | 2 | 2007 | 2009 | | |
| Manute Bol | C | 10 | 1 | 1993 | 1994 | | |
| Chris Bosh* | F/C | 1^{#} | 6 | 2010 | 2017 | • 2× NBA champion (2012, 2013) • 6× NBA All-Star (2011, 2012, 2013, 2014, 2015, 2016) • NBA All-Star Weekend Shooting Stars Competition (2013, 2014, 2015) | |
| Jamaree Bouyea | G | 11 | 1 | 2022 | 2023 | | |
| Bruce Bowen | F/G | 12 / 3 | 3 | 1997; 2000 | 1997; 2001 | • NBA All-Defensive Second Team (2001) | |
| Avery Bradley | G | 11 | 1 | 2020 | 2021 | | |
| Ernest Brown | C | 52 | 1† | 2001 | 2002 | | |
| P. J. Brown | F/C | 42 | 4 | 1996 | 2000 | • 2× NBA All-Defensive Second Team (1997, 1999) • J. Walter Kennedy Citizenship Award (1997) | |
| Shannon Brown | G | 26 | 1 | 2014 | 2014 | | |
| Thomas Bryant | C | 31 | 2 | 2023 | 2024 | | |
| Rodney Buford | G/F | 32 | 1 | 1999 | 2000 | | |
| Alec Burks | G | 18 | 1 | 2024 | 2025 | | |
| Willie Burton | F/G | 34 | 4 | 1990 | 1994 | • NBA All-Rookie Second Team (1991) | |
| Caron Butler | F | 4 | 2 | 2002 | 2004 | • NBA All-Rookie First Team (2003) | |
| Jimmy Butler | F | 22 | 6 | 2019 | 2025 | • NBA Conference Finals Most Valuable Player Award (2023) • 2× NBA All-Star (2020, 2022) • All-NBA Second Team (2023) • 2× All-NBA Third Team (2020, 2021) • NBA All-Defensive Second Team (2021) • NBA steals leader (2021) | |
| Rasual Butler | F/G | 45 | 3 | 2002 | 2005 | | |
| Jamal Cain | F | 8 | 2 | 2022 | 2024 | | |
| Anthony Carter | G | 25 | 4 | 1999 | 2003 | | |
| Duane Causwell | C | 4 / 31 | 4 | 1997 | 2001 | | |
| Cedric Ceballos | F | 23 | 1 | 2000 | 2001 | | |
| Mario Chalmers | G | 15 / 6 | 8 | 2008 | 2015 | • 2× NBA champion (2012, 2013) • NBA All-Rookie Second Team (2009) | |
| Rex Chapman | G | 7 | 1 | 1995 | 1996 | | |
| Josh Christopher | G | 8 | 1 | 2024 | 2025 | | |
| Norris Cole | G | 30 | 4 | 2011 | 2015 | • 2× NBA champion (2012, 2013) | |
| Bimbo Coles | G | 12 | 7 | 1990; 2003 | 1996; 2004 | | |
| Marty Conlon | C/F | 40 | 2 | 1998 | 1999 | | |
| Daequan Cook | G | 14 | 3 | 2007 | 2010 | • NBA All-Star Three-Point Shootout champion (2009) | |
| Tyrone Corbin | F/G | 23 | 1 | 1996 | 1996 | | |
| John Crotty | G | 11 | 1 | 1997 | 1997 | | |
| Jae Crowder | F | 99 | 1 | 2020 | 2020 | | |
| Pat Cummings | F/C | 42 | 2 | 1988 | 1990 | | |
| Eddy Curry | C | 34 | 1 | 2011 | 2012 | • NBA champion (2012) | |
| Erick Dampier | C | 25 | 1 | 2010 | 2011 | | |
| Predrag Danilović | G | 5 | 2 | 1995 | 1997 | | |
| Mark Davis | G/F | 7 | 1 | 1999 | 1999 | | |
| Ricky Davis | G | 31 / 21 | 2 | 2000; 2007 | 2001; 2008 | | |
| Terry Davis | F/C | 44 | 2 | 1989 | 1991 | | |
| Andre Dawkins | G | 24 | 1† | 2014 | 2015 | | |
| Todd Day | G/F | 11 | 1 | 1997 | 1997 | | |
| Dewayne Dedmon | C | 21 | 3 | 2021 | 2023 | | |
| Luol Deng | F | 9 | 2 | 2014 | 2016 | | |
| Yakhouba Diawara | F/G | 9 | 2 | 2008 | 2010 | | |
| Michael Doleac | C | 51 | 3 | 2004 | 2007 | • NBA champion (2006) | |
| Keyon Dooling | G | 5 | 1 | 2004 | 2005 | | |
| Sherman Douglas | G | 11 | 3 | 1989 | 1992 | • NBA All-Rookie First Team (1990) | |
| Toney Douglas | G | 0 | 1 | 2014 | 2014 | | |
| Goran Dragić | G | 7 | 7 | 2014 | 2021 | • NBA All-Star (2018) | |
| Zoran Dragić | G | 12 | 1 | 2015 | 2015 | | |
| Ledell Eackles | G/F | 21 | 1 | 1994 | 1995 | | |
| Blue Edwards | G/F | 32 | 1 | 1999 | 1999 | | |
| Kevin Edwards | G | 21 | 5 | 1988 | 1993 | • NBA All-Rookie Second Team (1989) | |
| Wayne Ellington | G | 2 | 3 | 2016 | 2019 | | |
| LaPhonso Ellis | F | 3 | 2 | 2001 | 2003 | | |
| LeRon Ellis | F/C | 28 | 1 | 1995 | 1995 | | |
| James Ennis | F | 32 | 2 | 2014 | 2015 | | |
| Matt Fish | C | 22 | 1 | 1997 | 1997 | | |
| Gerald Fitch | G | 4 | 1† | 2005 | 2006 | | |
| Simone Fontecchio^ | F | 0 | 1 | 2025 | present | | |
| Tellis Frank | F/C | 32 | 1 | 1989 | 1990 | | |
| Todd Fuller | C | 35 | 1 | 2000 | 2001 | | |
| Kevin Gamble | F/G | 35 | 2 | 1994 | 1996 | | |
| Myron Gardner^ | F | 15 | 1† | 2025 | present | | |
| Marcus Garrett | G | 0 | 1† | 2021 | 2021 | | |
| Chris Gatling | F/C | 15 | 2 | 1996; 2001 | 1996; 2002 | | |
| Matt Geiger | C | 52 | 3 | 1992 | 1995 | | |
| Kendall Gill | G/F | 13 | 1 | 2001 | 2002 | | |
| Mickell Gladness | C | 32 | 1 | 2011 | 2012 | | |
| Vladislav Goldin^ | C | 50 | 1† | 2025 | present | | |
| Ronnie Grandison | F | 54 | 1 | 1995 | 1996 | | |
| Danny Granger | F | 22 | 1 | 2014 | 2015 | | |
| Brian Grant | F/C | 44 | 4 | 2000 | 2004 | | |
| Gary Grant | G | 23 | 1 | 1996 | 1997 | | |
| Sylvester Gray | F | 40 | 1† | 1988 | 1989 | | |
| A.C. Green | F/C | 45 | 1 | 2000 | 2001 | | |
| Gerald Green | G | 14 | 1 | 2015 | 2016 | | |
| Kyle Guy | G | 5 | 1 | 2021 | 2022 | | |
| Scott Haffner | G | 3 | 1 | 1989 | 1990 | | |
| Justin Hamilton | C | 7 | 2 | 2014 | 2015 | | |
| Tang Hamilton | F | 8 | 1† | 2001 | 2001 | | |
| R. J. Hampton | G | 4 | 1 | 2023 | 2024 | | |
| Maurice Harkless | F | 8 | 1 | 2020 | 2021 | | |
| Penny Hardaway | G/F | 7 | 1 | 2007 | 2007 | | |
| Tim Hardaway* | G | 10^{#} | 6 | 1996 | 2001 | • 2× NBA All-Star (1997, 1998) • All-NBA First Team (1997) • 2× All-NBA Second Team (1998, 1999) • Basketball at the 2000 Summer Olympics – Men's tournament | |
| Josh Harrellson | C | 55 | 1 | 2012 | 2013 | | |
| Terrel Harris | G | 14 | 2 | 2011 | 2013 | • NBA champion (2012) | |
| Udonis Haslem | F | 40^{#} | 20† | 2003 | 2023 | • 3× NBA champion (2006, 2012, 2013) • NBA All-Rookie Second Team (2004) | |
| Scott Hastings | F/C | 44 | 1 | 1988 | 1989 | • Drafted in the 1988 NBA expansion draft | |
| Luther Head | G | 13 | 1 | 2009 | 2009 | | |
| Tyler Herro^ | G | 14 | 7† | 2019 | present | • NBA All-Star (2025) • NBA All-Rookie Second Team (2020) • NBA Sixth Man of the Year (2022) • NBA Three-Point Shootout champion (2025) | |
| Haywood Highsmith | F | 24 | 4 | 2021 | 2025 | | |
| Solomon Hill | F | 44 | 1 | 2020 | 2020 | | |
| Tyrone Hill | F | 32 | 1 | 2003 | 2003 | | |
| Robert Hite | G | 22 | 1† | 2006 | 2007 | | |
| Eddie House | G | 5 / 55 | 4 | 2000; 2010 | 2003; 2011 | | |
| Juwan Howard | F | 5 | 3 | 2010; 2013 | 2012; 2013 | • 2× NBA champion (2012, 2013) | |
| Andre Iguodala | G/F | 28 | 2 | 2020 | 2021 | | |
| Žydrūnas Ilgauskas | C | 11 | 1 | 2010 | 2011 | | |
| Jim Jackson | G | 24 | 1 | 2001 | 2002 | | |
| Luke Jackson | G/F | 6 | 1 | 2007 | 2008 | | |
| Kasparas Jakučionis^ | G | 25 | 1† | 2025 | present | | |
| LeBron James | F | 6 | 4 | 2010 | 2014 | • 2× NBA champion (2012, 2013) • 2× NBA Finals Most Valuable Player (2012, 2013) • 2× NBA Most Valuable Player (2012, 2013) • 4× NBA All-Star (2011, 2012, 2013, 2014) • 4× All-NBA First Team (2011, 2012, 2013, 2014) • 3× NBA All-Defensive First Team (2011, 2012, 2013) • NBA All-Defensive Second Team (2014) • Basketball at the 2012 Summer Olympics • NBA 75th Anniversary Team • 2× Best NBA Player ESPY Award (2012, 2013) | |
| Mike James | G | 7 / 12 | 2 | 2001 | 2003 | | |
| Tim James | F | 40 | 1 | 1999 | 2000 | | |
| Harold Jamison | F | 6 | 1 | 1999 | 2000 | | |
| Jaime Jaquez Jr.^ | F | 11 | 3† | 2023 | present | • NBA All-Rookie First Team (2024) | |
| Alexander Johnson | F | 13 | 1 | 2007 | 2008 | | |
| James Johnson | F | 16 | 4 | 2016 | 2020 | | |
| Joe Johnson | F | 2 | 1 | 2015 | 2017 | | |
| Ken Johnson | C/F | 54 | 1† | 2002 | 2003 | | |
| Keshad Johnson^ | F | 16 | 2† | 2024 | present | • NBA All-Star Slam Dunk champion (2026) | |
| Tyler Johnson | G | 8 | 5 | 2015 | 2019 | | |
| Bobby Jones | F | 21 | 1 | 2008 | 2008 | | |
| Damon Jones | G | 19 | 1 | 2004 | 2005 | | |
| Eddie Jones | G/F | 6 | 6 | 2000; 2007 | 2005; 2007 | | |
| James Jones | G/F | 22 | 6 | 2008 | 2014 | • 2× NBA champion (2012, 2013) • NBA All-Star Three-Point Shootout champion (2011) | |
| Derrick Jones Jr. | F | 5 | 3 | 2017 | 2020 | • NBA All-Star Slam Dunk champion (2020) | |
| Nikola Jović^ | F | 5 | 4† | 2022 | present | | |
| Jason Kapono | F | 24 | 2 | 2005 | 2007 | • NBA champion (2006) • NBA All-Star Three-Point Shootout champion (2007) | |
| Trevor Keels^ | G | 8 | 1 | 2026 | present | | |
| Alec Kessler | F/C | 33 | 4† | 1990 | 1994 | | |
| Stacey King | F/C | 21 | 1 | 1995 | 1996 | | |
| Christian Laettner | F/C | 44 | 1 | 2004 | 2005 | | |
| Sean Lampley | F | 21 | 1 | 2002 | 2003 | | |
| Antonio Lang | F/G | 22 | 1 | 1998 | 1998 | | |
| Pelle Larsson^ | G | 9 | 2† | 2024 | present | | |
| Stephane Lasme | F | 45 | 1 | 2008 | 2008 | | |
| Voshon Lenard | G | 22 / 21 | 5 | 1995 | 2000 | | |
| Meyers Leonard | C | 0 | 2 | 2019 | 2021 | | |
| Rashard Lewis | F | 9 | 2 | 2012 | 2014 | • NBA champion (2013) | |
| DeAndre Liggins | G/F | 14 | 1 | 2014 | 2014 | | |
| Shaun Livingston | G | 8 | 1 | 2008 | 2009 | | |
| Brad Lohaus | F/C | 54 | 1 | 1994 | 1995 | | |
| Grant Long | F | 43 | 7 | 1988 | 1994 | | |
| Kevin Love | F | 42 | 3 | 2023 | 2025 | | |
| Kyle Lowry | G | 7 | 3 | 2021 | 2024 | | |
| Sam Mack | F/G | 4 | 1 | 2001 | 2001 | | |
| Don MacLean | F | 7 | 1 | 2000 | 2001 | | |
| Daryl Macon | G | 15 | 1 | 2019 | 2020 | | |
| Jamaal Magloire | C | 21 | 3 | 2008 | 2011 | | |
| Dan Majerle | G/F | 9 | 5 | 1996 | 2001 | | |
| Jeff Malone | G | 25 | 1 | 1996 | 1996 | | |
| Shawn Marion | F | 7 | 2 | 2008 | 2009 | | |
| Sean Marks | F/C | 22 | 2 | 2001 | 2003 | | |
| Caleb Martin | F | 16 | 3 | 2021 | 2024 | | |
| Jamal Mashburn | F | 24 | 4 | 1997 | 2000 | | |
| Anthony Mason | F | 14 | 1 | 2000 | 2001 | • NBA All-Star (2001) | |
| Roger Mason, Jr. | G | 21 | 1 | 2013 | 2014 | | |
| Yante Maten | F | 00 | 1 | 2018 | 2019 | | |
| Rodney McGruder | G | 17 | 3 | 2016 | 2019 | | |
| Josh McRoberts | F/C | 4 | 2 | 2014 | 2017 | | |
| Jordan Mickey | C | 25 | 1 | 2017 | 2018 | | |
| Mike Miller | F | 13 | 3 | 2010 | 2013 | • 2× NBA champion (2012, 2013) | |
| Patty Mills | G | 88 | 1 | 2024 | 2024 | | |
| Terry Mills | F | 6 | 2 | 1997 | 1999 | | |
| Harold Miner | G | 32 / 4 | 3 | 1992 | 1995 | • 2× NBA All-Star Slam Dunk champion (1993, 1995) | |
| Davion Mitchell^ | G | 45 | 2 | 2025 | present | | |
| Todd Mitchell | F | 34 | 1 | 1988 | 1989 | | |
| Jamario Moon | F | 8 | 1 | 2009 | 2009 | | |
| Markieff Morris | F | 8 | 1 | 2021 | 2022 | | |
| John Morton | G | 23 | 1 | 1991 | 1992 | | |
| Alonzo Mourning* | C | 33^{#} | 11 | 1995; 2005 | 2003; 2008 | • NBA champion (2006) • 5× NBA All-Star (1996, 1997, 2000, 2001, 2002) • All-NBA First Team (1999) • All-NBA Second Team (2000) • 2× NBA Defensive Player of the Year (1999, 2000) • 2× NBA All-Defensive First Team (1999, 2000) • 2× NBA block leader (1999, 2000) • J. Walter Kennedy Citizenship Award (2002) • FIBA Hall of Fame (2019) • Basketball at the 2000 Summer Olympics – Men's tournament • NBA Community Assist Award (2006) | |
| Mychal Mulder | G | 12 | 1 | 2022 | 2022 | | |
| Eric Murdock | G | 5 | 1 | 1997 | 1998 | | |
| Martin Müürsepp | F | 31 | 1 | 1996 | 1997 | | |
| Pete Myers | G/F | 20 | 1 | 1995 | 1996 | | |
| Shabazz Napier | G | 13 | 1 | 2014 | 2015 | | |
| Craig Neal | G | 11 | 1 | 1989 | 1989 | | |
| Kendrick Nunn | G | 25 | 2 | 2019 | 2021 | • NBA All-Rookie First Team (2020) | |
| Greg Oden | C | 20 | 1 | 2013 | 2014 | | |
| Lamar Odom | F | 7 | 1 | 2003 | 2004 | | |
| Alan Ogg | C | 53 | 2 | 1991 | 1992 | | |
| KZ Okpala | F | 4 / 11 | 2 | 2019 | 2022 | | |
| Victor Oladipo | G | 4 | 2 | 2021 | 2023 | | |
| Kelly Olynyk | F/C | 9 | 4 | 2017 | 2021 | | |
| Jermaine O'Neal | C/F | 7 | 2 | 2009 | 2010 | | |
| Shaquille O'Neal* | C | 32^{#} | 4 | 2004 | 2008 | • NBA champion (2006) • 3× NBA All-Star (2005, 2006, 2007) • 2× All-NBA First Team (2005, 2006) • FIBA Hall of Fame (2017) • NBA 75th Anniversary Team | |
| Billy Owens | G/F | 30 / 32 | 2 | 1994 | 1996 | | |
| Smush Parker | G | 21 | 1 | 2007 | 2008 | | |
| Gary Payton* | G | 20 | 2 | 2005 | 2007 | • NBA champion (2006) • NBA 75th Anniversary Team | |
| Kirk Penney | G | 20 | 1 | 2003 | 2003 | | |
| Wesley Person | G/F | 7 | 1 | 2004 | 2005 | | |
| Ed Pinckney | F | 54 | 1 | 1996 | 1997 | | |
| Dexter Pittman | C | 45 | 3 | 2010 | 2013 | • NBA champion (2012) | |
| Dave Popson | F/C | 41 | 1 | 1989 | 1989 | | |
| Terry Porter | G | 30 | 1 | 1999 | 1999 | | |
| James Posey | F/G | 42 | 2 | 2005 | 2007 | • NBA champion (2006) | |
| Kasib Powell | F | 12 | 1† | 2008 | 2008 | | |
| Norman Powell^ | G | 24 | 1 | 2025 | present | • NBA All-Star (2026) | |
| Kevin Pritchard | G | 14 | 1 | 1995 | 1995 | | |
| Chris Quinn | G | 11 | 3 | 2006 | 2010 | | |
| Shavlik Randolph | F | 42 | 1 | 2009; 2010 | 2009; 2010 | | |
| Willie Reed | C | 35 | 1 | 2016 | 2017 | | |
| Khalid Reeves | G | 3 | 1 | 1994 | 1995 | | |
| Terrence Rencher | G | 15 | 1 | 1995 | 1996 | | |
| Glen Rice | G/F | 41 | 6 | 1989 | 1995 | • NBA All-Rookie First Team (1990) • NBA All-Star Three-Point Shootout champion (1995) | |
| Josh Richardson | G | 0 | 6 | 2016; 2023 | 2019; 2025 | | |
| Quentin Richardson | G/F | 5 | 1 | 2009 | 2010 | | |
| Duncan Robinson | G/F | 55 | 7 | 2018 | 2025 | | |
| Jamal Robinson | G/F | 13 | 1† | 2000 | 2000 | | |
| Orlando Robinson | C | 25 | 2 | 2022 | 2024 | | |
| Jim Rowinski | F/C | 50 | 1 | 1990 | 1990 | | |
| Terry Rozier | G | 2 | 2 | 2023 | 2025 | | |
| John Salley | F/C | 22 | 3 | 1992 | 1995 | | |
| Danny Schayes | C/F | 24 | 1 | 1995 | 1996 | | |
| James Scott | G/F | 32 | 1† | 1996 | 1997 | | |
| Rony Seikaly | C | 4 | 6 | 1988 | 1994 | • NBA Most Improved Player (1990) | |
| John Shasky | F/C | 45 | 1 | 1988 | 1989 | | |
| Brian Shaw | G | 20 / 22 | 3 | 1992 | 1994 | | |
| Chris Silva | F | 30 | 3 | 2020; 2022 | 2021; 2022 | | |
| Wayne Simien | F | 25 | 2† | 2005 | 2007 | • NBA champion (2006) | |
| Charles Smith | G | 14 | 1 | 1997 | 1998 | | |
| Dru Smith^ | G | 9 / 12 | 4 | 2022; 2023 | 2022 present | | |
| Steve Smith | G | 3 / 8 | 5 | 1991; 2005 | 1994; 2005 | • NBA All-Rookie First Team (1992) | |
| Tony Smith | G | 14 | 1 | 1996 | 1996 | | |
| Rory Sparrow | G | 2 | 2 | 1988 | 1990 | | |
| Jerry Stackhouse | G/F | 42 | 1 | 2010 | 2010 | | |
| Nik Stauskas | G | 9 | 1 | 2021 | 2022 | | |
| Vladimir Stepania | C | 50 | 2 | 2001 | 2003 | | |
| Isaiah Stevens | G | 4 | 1 | 2024 | 2025 | | |
| Jarnell Stokes | C | 12 | 1 | 2015 | 2016 | | |
| Amar'e Stoudemire* | C | 5 | 1 | 2015 | 2016 | | |
| Mark Strickland | F | 30 / 5 | 4 | 1996 | 2000 | | |
| Rod Strickland | G | 1 | 1 | 2001 | 2002 | | |
| Max Strus | G/F | 31 | 3 | 2021 | 2023 | | |
| Jon Sundvold | G | 20 | 4 | 1988 | 1992 | • Drafted in the 1988 NBA expansion draft | |
| Cole Swider | F | 21 | 1 | 2023 | 2024 | | |
| Anthony Taylor | G | 3 | 1† | 1988 | 1988 | | |
| Emanuel Terry | F | 12 | 1 | 2019 | 2019 | | |
| Kurt Thomas | F | 40 | 2 | 1995 | 1997 | | |
| Billy Thompson | F | 55 | 3 | 1988 | 1991 | • Drafted in the 1988 NBA expansion draft | |
| Otis Thorpe | F/C | 52 | 1 | 1999 | 2000 | | |
| P. J. Tucker | F | 17 | 1 | 2021 | 2022 | | |
| Ronny Turiaf | C/F | 21 | 1 | 2012 | 2012 | • NBA champion (2012) | |
| Beno Udrih | G | 19 | 1 | 2015 | 2016 | | |
| Kelvin Upshaw | G | 10 | 1 | 1989 | 1989 | | |
| Jarvis Varnado | F | 24 | 1 | 2013 | 2013 | • NBA champion (2013) | |
| Gabe Vincent | G | 2 | 4 | 2020 | 2023 | | |
| Dwyane Wade* | G | 3^{#} | 15 | 2003; 2018 | 2016; 2019 | • 3× NBA champion (2006, 2012, 2013) • NBA Finals Most Valuable Player (2006) • NBA All-Star Game Most Valuable Player (2010) • 13× NBA All-Star (2005, 2006, 2007, 2008, 2009, 2010, 2011, 2012, 2013, 2014, 2015, 2016, 2019) • 2× All-NBA First Team (2009, 2010) • 3× All-NBA Second Team (2005, 2006, 2011) • 3× All-NBA Third Team (2007, 2012, 2013) • 3× NBA All-Defensive Second Team (2005, 2009, 2010) • NBA All-Rookie First Team (2004) • NBA scoring leader (2009) • 2× NBA All-Star Skills Challenge champion (2006, 2007) • Basketball at the 2008 Summer Olympics • NBA 75th Anniversary Team • NBA Community Assist Award (2013) • Best NBA Player ESPY Award (2006) | |
| Milt Wagner | G | 25 | 1 | 1990 | 1990 | | |
| Dion Waiters | G | 11 | 4 | 2016 | 2020 | | |
| Antoine Walker | F | 8 | 2 | 2005 | 2007 | • NBA champion (2006) | |
| Henry Walker | G/F | 5 | 1 | 2015 | 2015 | | |
| Samaki Walker | F | 52 | 1 | 2003 | 2004 | | |
| John Wallace | F | 22 | 1 | 2003 | 2004 | | |
| Matt Walsh | G/F | 44 | 1† | 2005 | 2005 | | |
| Rex Walters | G | 23 | 3 | 1998 | 2000 | | |
| Derrick Walton | G | 14 | 1 | 2017 | 2018 | | |
| Kel'el Ware^ | C | 7 | 2† | 2024 | present | • NBA All-Rookie Second Team (2025) | |
| Andrew Wiggins^ | F | 22 | 2 | 2025 | present | | |
| Wang Zhizhi | C | 15 | 2 | 2003 | 2005 | | |
| Dwayne Washington | G | 31 | 1 | 1988 | 1989 | • Drafted in the 1988 NBA expansion draft | |
| Jamie Watson | F | 3 | 1 | 1999 | 1999 | | |
| Clarence Weatherspoon | F | 35 | 2 | 1999 | 2000 | | |
| Brianté Weber | G | 12 | 1 | 2016 | 2016 | | |
| Clinton Wheeler | G | 10 | 1 | 1988 | 1988 | | |
| Okaro White | F | 15 | 1 | 2017 | 2018 | | |
| Hassan Whiteside | C | 21 | 5 | 2014 | 2019 | • NBA All-Defensive Second Team (2016) • NBA block leader (2016) • NBA rebounding leader (2017) | |
| Morlon Wiley | G | 21 | 1 | 1994 | 1994 | | |
| Alondes Williams | G | 15 | 1 | 2024 | 2024 | | |
| Derrick Williams | F | 22 | 1 | 2016 | 2017 | | |
| Jason Williams | G | 55 | 3 | 2005 | 2008 | • NBA champion (2006) | |
| Matt Williams | G | 12 | 1 | 2017 | 2017 | | |
| Shawne Williams | F | 43 | 1 | 2014 | 2015 | | |
| Walt Williams | F/G | 42 | 1 | 1996 | 1996 | | |
| Kevin Willis | F/C | 42 | 2 | 1994 | 1996 | | |
| Justise Winslow | G/F | 20 | 5 | 2015 | 2020 | • NBA All-Rookie Second Team (2016) | |
| Loren Woods | C/F | 1 | 1 | 2003 | 2004 | | |
| Qyntel Woods | F | 24 | 1 | 2005 | 2005 | | |
| Delon Wright | G | 4 | 1 | 2024 | 2024 | | |
| Dorell Wright | G/F | 1 / 11 | 6 | 2004; 2015 | 2010; 2016 | • NBA champion (2006) | |
| Jahmir Young^ | G | 17 | 1 | 2026 | present | | |
| Ömer Yurtseven | C | 77 | 3 | 2021 | 2023 | | |
| Cody Zeller | C | 44 | 1 | 2023 | 2023 | | |

== International players ==
In the National Basketball Association (NBA), foreign players—also known as international players—are those who were born outside of the United States. Players who were born in U.S. overseas territories, such as Puerto Rico, U.S. Virgin Islands and Guam, are considered international players even if they are U.S. citizens. In some borderline cases, the NBA takes into consideration whether a player desires to be identified as international. 18 international players have played for the Heat. The first foreign-born Heat is Rony Seikaly, who was born in Lebanon. However, he grew up in Greece and played college basketball in the United States for Syracuse University. He was drafted ninth in the first round of the 1988 draft and became the Heat's first-ever draft pick.

The following is a list of international players who have played for the Heat, listed by their national team affiliation.

Australia

- Patty Mills

Canada

- Joel Anthony
- Jamaal Magloire (born in Canada but never represented Canada internationally)
- Andrew Wiggins

China

- Kyle Anderson (born in the United States, represented China internationally)
- Wang Zhizhi

Estonia

- Martin Müürsepp

France

- Yakhouba Diawara
- Ronny Turiaf

Gabon

- Stephane Lasme

(Georgia (country)) Georgia

- Vladimir Stepania (born in Georgian SSR, Soviet Union (now Georgia), represented Georgia internationally)

(United Kingdom) Great Britain

- Luol Deng (born in Wau, Sudan (now South Sudan), became a naturalized British citizen, represented England internationally at youth level and now represents Great Britain internationally)

Italy

- Simone Fontecchio

(Republic of Ireland) Ireland

- Marty Conlon (born in the United States, represented Ireland internationally)

Jamaica

- Norman Powell (born in the United States, represented Jamaica internationally)
- Nick Richards

Lebanon

- Rony Seikaly (born in the Lebanon, represented Lebanon internationally)

Lithuania

- Žydrūnas Ilgauskas
- Kasparas Jakučionis

Mexico

- Jaime Jaquez Jr. (born in the United States, represented Mexico internationally)

New Zealand

- Sean Marks
- Kirk Penney

Puerto Rico

- Carlos Arroyo

Russia

- Vladislav Goldin

Serbia and Montenegro / FR Yugoslavia

- Miloš Babić (born in SR Serbia, SFR Yugoslavia (now Serbia), but never represented Serbia and Montenegro or FR Yugoslavia internationally)
- Predrag Danilović (born in SR Bosnia and Herzegovina, SFR Yugoslavia (now Bosnia and Herzegovina), represented SFR Yugoslavia and FR Yugoslavia internationally)
- Nikola Jović

Slovenia

- Goran Dragić
- Zoran Dragić
- Beno Udrih

Sudan

- Manute Bol

Sweden

- Pelle Larsson

(Turkey) Türkiye

- Ömer Yurtseven

== Statistics leaders ==
Note: Statistics are accurate as of the 2025–26 NBA season.

| ^ | Denotes player who is currently on the Heat roster |

=== Games ===
Regular season
| Rank | Player | Games |
|---|---|---|
| 1 | Dwyane Wade | 948 |
| 2 | Udonis Haslem | 879 |
| 3 | Bam Adebayo^ | 640 |
| 4 | Alonzo Mourning | 593 |
| 5 | Mario Chalmers | 525 |
| 6 | Keith Askins | 486 |
| 7 | Glen Rice | 478 |
| 8 | Grant Long | 472 |
| 9 | Bimbo Coles | 462 |
| 10 | Rony Seikaly | 439 |

Playoffs
| Rank | Player | Games |
|---|---|---|
| 1 | Dwyane Wade | 171 |
| 2 | Udonis Haslem | 149 |
| 3 | Mario Chalmers | 99 |
| 4 | LeBron James | 87 |
| 5 | Alonzo Mourning | 82 |

=== Minutes ===
Regular season
| Rank | Player | Minutes |
|---|---|---|
| 1 | Dwyane Wade | 32,912 |
| 2 | Udonis Haslem | 21,720 |
| 3 | Bam Adebayo^ | 19,719 |
| 4 | Alonzo Mourning | 17,700 |
| 5 | Glen Rice | 17,059 |
| 6 | Grant Long | 14,859 |
| 7 | Mario Chalmers | 14,571 |
| 8 | Rony Seikaly | 14,208 |
| 9 | Eddie Jones | 14,097 |
| 10 | Tim Hardaway | 13,271 |

Playoffs
| Rank | Player | Minutes |
|---|---|---|
| 1 | Dwyane Wade | 6,507 |
| 2 | LeBron James | 3,628 |
| 3 | Udonis Haslem | 3,197 |
| 4 | Mario Chalmers | 2,877 |
| 5 | Chris Bosh | 2,710 |

=== Points ===
Regular season
| Rank | Player | Points |
|---|---|---|
| 1 | Dwyane Wade | 21,566 |
| 2 | Bam Adebayo^ | 10,391 |
| 3 | Alonzo Mourning | 9,459 |
| 4 | Glen Rice | 9,248 |
| 5 | LeBron James | 7,919 |
| 6 | Tyler Herro^ | 7,664 |
| 7 | Chris Bosh | 6,914 |
| 8 | Rony Seikaly | 6,742 |
| 9 | Jimmy Butler | 6,630 |
| 10 | Udonis Haslem | 6,586 |

Playoffs
| Rank | Player | Points |
|---|---|---|
| 1 | Dwyane Wade | 3,864 |
| 2 | LeBron James | 2,338 |
| 3 | Jimmy Butler | 1,583 |
| 4 | Bam Adebayo^ | 1,278 |
| 5 | Chris Bosh | 1,163 |

=== Field goals ===
Regular season
| Rank | Player | FG |
|---|---|---|
| 1 | Dwyane Wade | 7,842 |
| 2 | Bam Adebayo^ | 3,934 |
| 3 | Glen Rice | 3,604 |
| 4 | Alonzo Mourning | 3,445 |
| 5 | LeBron James | 2,911 |
| 6 | Tyler Herro^ | 2,787 |
| 7 | Udonis Haslem | 2,669 |
| 8 | Chris Bosh | 2,595 |
| 9 | Rony Seikaly | 2,486 |
| 10 | Goran Dragić | 2,335 |

Playoffs
| Rank | Player | FG |
|---|---|---|
| 1 | Dwyane Wade | 1,418 |
| 2 | LeBron James | 829 |
| 3 | Jimmy Butler | 536 |
| 4 | Bam Adebayo^ | 504 |
| 5 | Chris Bosh | 437 |

=== 3-point field goals ===
Regular season
| Rank | Player | 3P |
|---|---|---|
| 1 | Duncan Robinson | 1,202 |
| 2 | Tyler Herro^ | 1,068 |
| 3 | Tim Hardaway | 806 |
| 4 | Eddie Jones | 712 |
| 5 | Glen Rice | 708 |
| 6 | Mario Chalmers | 657 |
| 7 | Goran Dragić | 588 |
| 8 | Josh Richardson | 491 |
| 9 | Dwyane Wade | 481 |
| 10 | Voshon Lenard | 473 |

Playoffs
| Rank | Player | 3P |
|---|---|---|
| 1 | Duncan Robinson | 147 |
| 2 | LeBron James | 123 |
| 3 | Mario Chalmers | 117 |
| 4 | Dwyane Wade | 97 |
| 5 | Tyler Herro^ | 96 |

=== Free throws ===
Regular season
| Rank | Player | FT |
|---|---|---|
| 1 | Dwyane Wade | 5,391 |
| 2 | Alonzo Mourning | 2,558 |
| 3 | Bam Adebayo^ | 2,294 |
| 4 | Jimmy Butler | 2,188 |
| 5 | Rony Seikaly | 1,766 |
| 6 | LeBron James | 1,732 |
| 7 | Chris Bosh | 1,469 |
| 8 | Grant Long | 1,437 |
| 9 | Glen Rice | 1,332 |
| 10 | Udonis Haslem | 1,239 |

Playoffs
| Rank | Player | FT |
|---|---|---|
| 1 | Dwyane Wade | 931 |
| 2 | LeBron James | 557 |
| 3 | Jimmy Butler | 441 |
| 4 | Alonzo Mourning | 294 |
| 5 | Bam Adebayo^ | 261 |

=== Rebounds ===
Regular season
| Rank | Player | Rebounds |
|---|---|---|
| 1 | Udonis Haslem | 5,791 |
| 2 | Bam Adebayo^ | 5,756 |
| 3 | Alonzo Mourning | 4,807 |
| 4 | Rony Seikaly | 4,544 |
| 5 | Dwyane Wade | 4,482 |
| 6 | Hassan Whiteside | 3,870 |
| 7 | Grant Long | 3,281 |
| 8 | Chris Bosh | 2,816 |
| 9 | Brian Grant | 2,654 |
| 10 | Glen Rice | 2,363 |

Playoffs
| Rank | Player | Rebounds |
|---|---|---|
| 1 | Dwyane Wade | 898 |
| 2 | Udonis Haslem | 823 |
| 3 | LeBron James | 734 |
| 4 | Bam Adebayo^ | 715 |
| 5 | Chris Bosh | 566 |

=== Blocks ===
Regular season
| Rank | Player | Blocks |
|---|---|---|
| 1 | Alonzo Mourning | 1,625 |
| 2 | Dwyane Wade | 812 |
| 3 | Hassan Whiteside | 783 |
| 4 | Rony Seikaly | 610 |
| 5 | Bam Adebayo^ | 538 |
| 6 | Joel Anthony | 456 |
| 7 | Shaquille O'Neal | 384 |
| 8 | Chris Bosh | 332 |
| 9 | P. J. Brown | 305 |
| 10 | Udonis Haslem | 252 |

Playoffs
| Rank | Player | Blocks |
|---|---|---|
| 1 | Alonzo Mourning | 171 |
| 2 | Dwyane Wade | 167 |
| 3 | Chris Bosh | 89 |
| 4 | Joel Anthony | 70 |
| 4 | LeBron James | 70 |

=== Assists ===
Regular season
| Rank | Player | Assists |
|---|---|---|
| 1 | Dwyane Wade | 5,310 |
| 2 | Tim Hardaway | 2,867 |
| 3 | Bam Adebayo^ | 2,276 |
| 4 | Goran Dragić | 2,034 |
| 5 | Mario Chalmers | 2,004 |
| 6 | LeBron James | 1,980 |
| 7 | Bimbo Coles | 1,961 |
| 8 | Jimmy Butler | 1,789 |
| 9 | Tyler Herro^ | 1,596 |
| 10 | Sherman Douglas | 1,262 |

Playoffs
| Rank | Player | Assists |
|---|---|---|
| 1 | Dwyane Wade | 846 |
| 2 | LeBron James | 499 |
| 3 | Jimmy Butler | 362 |
| 4 | Mario Chalmers | 321 |
| 5 | Bam Adebayo^ | 270 |

=== Steals ===
Regular season
| Rank | Player | Steals |
|---|---|---|
| 1 | Dwyane Wade | 1,492 |
| 2 | Mario Chalmers | 791 |
| 3 | Bam Adebayo^ | 693 |
| 4 | Grant Long | 666 |
| 5 | Glen Rice | 572 |
| 6 | Kevin Edwards | 560 |
| 7 | Tim Hardaway | 541 |
| 8 | Jimmy Butler | 528 |
| 9 | Eddie Jones | 515 |
| 10 | LeBron James | 489 |

Playoffs
| Rank | Player | Steals |
|---|---|---|
| 1 | Dwyane Wade | 268 |
| 2 | LeBron James | 155 |
| 3 | Jimmy Butler | 121 |
| 4 | Mario Chalmers | 118 |
| 5 | Bam Adebayo^ | 67 |

== Single Game Leaders ==
Points
| Rank | Player | Points | Date |
|---|---|---|---|
| 1 | Bam Adebayo^ | 83 | March 10, 2026 |
| 2 | LeBron James | 61 | March 3, 2014 |
| 3 | Glen Rice | 56 | April 15, 1995 |
| 4 | Dwyane Wade | 55 | April 12, 2009 |
| 5 | LeBron James | 51 | February 3, 2011 |

Source: https://stathead.com/tiny/TdNjB

Rebounds
| Rank | Player | Rebounds | Date |
|---|---|---|---|
| 1 | Rony Seikaly | 34 | March 3, 1993 |
| 2 | Hassan Whiteside | 25 | March 4, 2015 |
| 2 | Hassan Whiteside | 25 | November 15, 2016 |
| 4 | Rony Seikaly | 24 | December 11, 1991 |
| 4 | Kevin Willis | 24 | December 21, 1994 |
| 4 | Hassan Whiteside | 24 | January 30, 2015 |
| 4 | Hassan Whiteside | 24 | October 29, 2018 |
| 4 | Hassan Whiteside | 24 | February 28, 2015 |

Source:https://stathead.com/tiny/PRdOg

Assists
| Rank | Player | Assists | Date |
|---|---|---|---|
| 1 | Tim Hardaway | 19 | April 19, 1996 |
| 2 | Sherman Douglas | 17 | February 26, 1990 |
| 2 | Goran Dragić | 17 | November 28, 2016 |
| 4 | Sherman Douglas | 16 | February 2, 1991 |
| 4 | Tim Hardaway | 16 | March 30, 1996 |
| 4 | Tim Hardaway | 16 | March 4, 1997 |
| 4 | Dwyane Wade | 16 | February 24, 2009 |
| 4 | Dwyane Wade | 16 | March 4, 2009 |
| 4 | LeBron James | 16 | February 26, 2013 |

Source: https://stathead.com/tiny/pH91B

== Notes ==
- ^{a} Players can sometimes be assigned more than one jersey number.
- ^{b} Each year is linked to an article about that particular NBA season.
- ^{c} Only includes achievements as Heat players.
