= Jae Crowder =

American basketball player (born 1990)

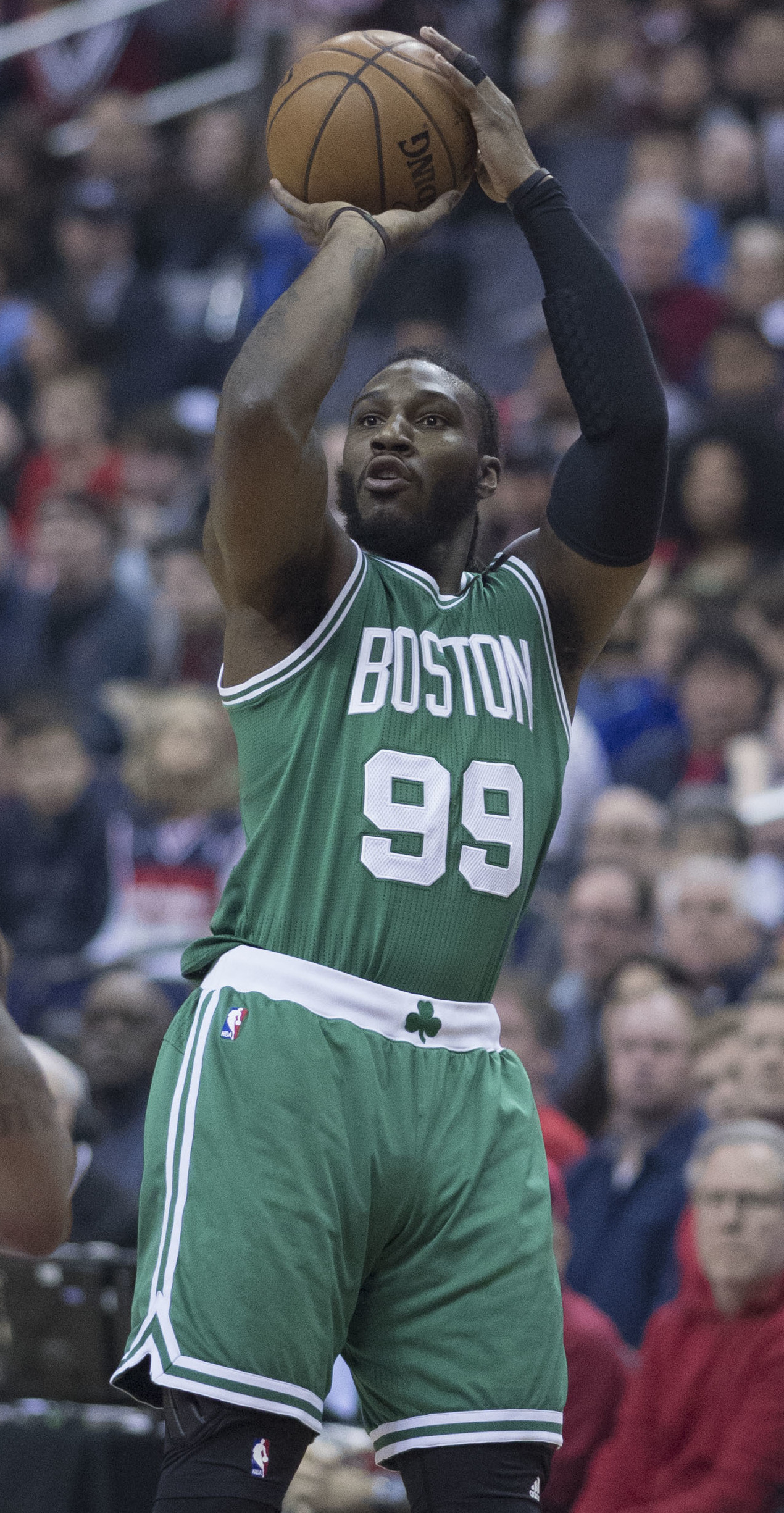
- Crowder with the Boston Celtics in 2017

No. 99 – ASVEL
- Position: Power forward / small forward
- League: LNB Élite; EuroLeague

Personal information
- Born: July 6, 1990 (age 36) Villa Rica, Georgia, U.S.
- Listed height: 1.99 m (6 ft 6 in)
- Listed weight: 235 lb (107 kg)

Career information
- High school: Villa Rica (Villa Rica, Georgia)
- College: South Georgia Tech (2008–2009); Howard College (2009–2010); Marquette (2010–2012)
- NBA draft: 2012: 2nd round, 34th overall pick
- Drafted by: Cleveland Cavaliers
- Playing career: 2012–present

Career history
- 2012–2014: Dallas Mavericks
- 2014: →Texas Legends
- 2014–2017: Boston Celtics
- 2017–2018: Cleveland Cavaliers
- 2018–2019: Utah Jazz
- 2019–2020: Memphis Grizzlies
- 2020: Miami Heat
- 2020–2023: Phoenix Suns
- 2023–2024: Milwaukee Bucks
- 2024–2025: Sacramento Kings
- 2026: Vaqueros de Bayamón
- 2026–present: ASVEL

Career highlights
- BSN All-Star (2026); Second-team All-American – AP, SN (2012); Third-team All-American – NABC (2012); Big East Player of the Year (2012); First-team All-Big East (2012); NJCAA champion (2010); NABC Junior College Player of the Year (2010)
- Stats at NBA.com
- Stats at Basketball Reference

Corey Jae Crowder (/dʒeɪ/ JAY; born July 6, 1990) is an American professional basketball player for ASVEL of the French LNB Élite and the EuroLeague. Not being heavily recruited out of high school, Crowder committed to South Georgia Technical College and later Howard College, where he led the team to an NJCAA Division I championship in his sophomore season. While at Howard College, Crowder was also named State Farm Junior College Player of the Year. Later, he transferred to Marquette, where he was named Big East Player of the Year in his senior season. After his senior year, Crowder declared for the 2012 NBA draft, where he was drafted 34th overall by the Cleveland Cavaliers and traded to the Dallas Mavericks on draft night.

In 2014, Crowder was traded to the Boston Celtics. He spent three years in Boston before being traded back to his draft team, the Cavaliers, in August 2017. In 2018, Crowder was traded to the Utah Jazz. He was dealt to the Memphis Grizzlies in 2019, and he was traded to the Miami Heat in 2020, with whom he reached his first NBA Finals with the same year. In the 2020 offseason, Crowder signed with the Phoenix Suns and reached his second NBA Finals in 2021. After disagreements between Crowder and the Suns' front office, both sides mutually agreed on having Crowder sit out for the start of the 2022–23 season. He would eventually be traded to the Milwaukee Bucks in 2023. In 2024, he signed with the Sacramento Kings.

== Early life ==
Jae Crowder was born on July 6, 1990, in Villa Rica, Georgia, to Helen Thompson and basketball player Corey Crowder. Crowder attended Villa Rica High School, where he played as starting quarterback for the football team and as starting point guard for the basketball team. Crowder spent the summer holidays in Florida, working out and training with his father, then a professional basketball player with 2 years experience in the NBA who was playing in Europe. Growing up, he was undersized and overweight, weighing nearly 200 pounds in his junior year. Eventually, he called his father to help him lose weight. By the end of his junior year, he had grown to 6 ft 4 in (1.93 m) and had significantly improved his physical conditioning.

== College career ==
Crowder was not heavily recruited out of high school, although he had some offers in football. He committed to South Georgia Technical College, a college in Americus, Georgia. He later transferred to Howard College for his sophomore season. After his junior college eligibility ended, he transferred to Marquette.

=== South Georgia Tech ===
In his only season with South Georgia Tech, he led the Jets to their first-ever NJCAA national tournament appearance in his freshman season, under head coach Steven Wright, with the team finishing with a 21–7 record. He was named Georgia Junior College Athletic Association Player of the Year that season.

=== Howard College ===
In his sophomore season with the Howard Hawks in 2010, Crowder was not only named NABC NJCAA Player of the Year but also helped the team win its first-ever NJCAA Division I championship. In the final game, he registered 27 points and 12 rebounds in an 85–80 overtime victory against Three Rivers Community College. He averaged 18.9 points, 9.0 rebounds, 2.5 assists and 2.4 steals per game as a sophomore while shooting 46.0 percent from the field and 76.0 percent from the free throw line.

=== Marquette ===
After his season with the Howard Hawks, Crowder transferred to Marquette University, selecting the Golden Eagles over UNLV, Georgia Tech, Texas Tech and Illinois State, among others. He averaged 11.8 points and 6.8 rebounds in his first season with Marquette. Some basketball statisticians believe Crowder was statistically the best all-around player during the 2010–11 season. On January 1, 2011, Crowder recorded a career-high 29 points and 8 rebounds in a game against the West Virginia Mountaineers. On March 30, 2012, Crowder was named East Perfect Player of the Game in the Reese's College All-Star Game.

For the 2011–2012 season, Crowder averaged 17.5 points and 8.4 rebounds per game. Crowder led Marquette to a second-place finish in the Big East, as well as their second consecutive Sweet 16. During the same season, he was named Big East Player of the Year, as well as an AP Second-Team All American.

=== College awards and honors ===
- Second-team All-American – AP, TSN (2012)
- Third-team All-American – NABC (2012)
- Big East Player of the Year (2012)
- All-Big East First Team (2012)
- NABC Junior College Player of the Year (2010)
- NJCAA Men's Division I champion (2010)

== Professional career ==
=== Dallas Mavericks (2012–2014) ===
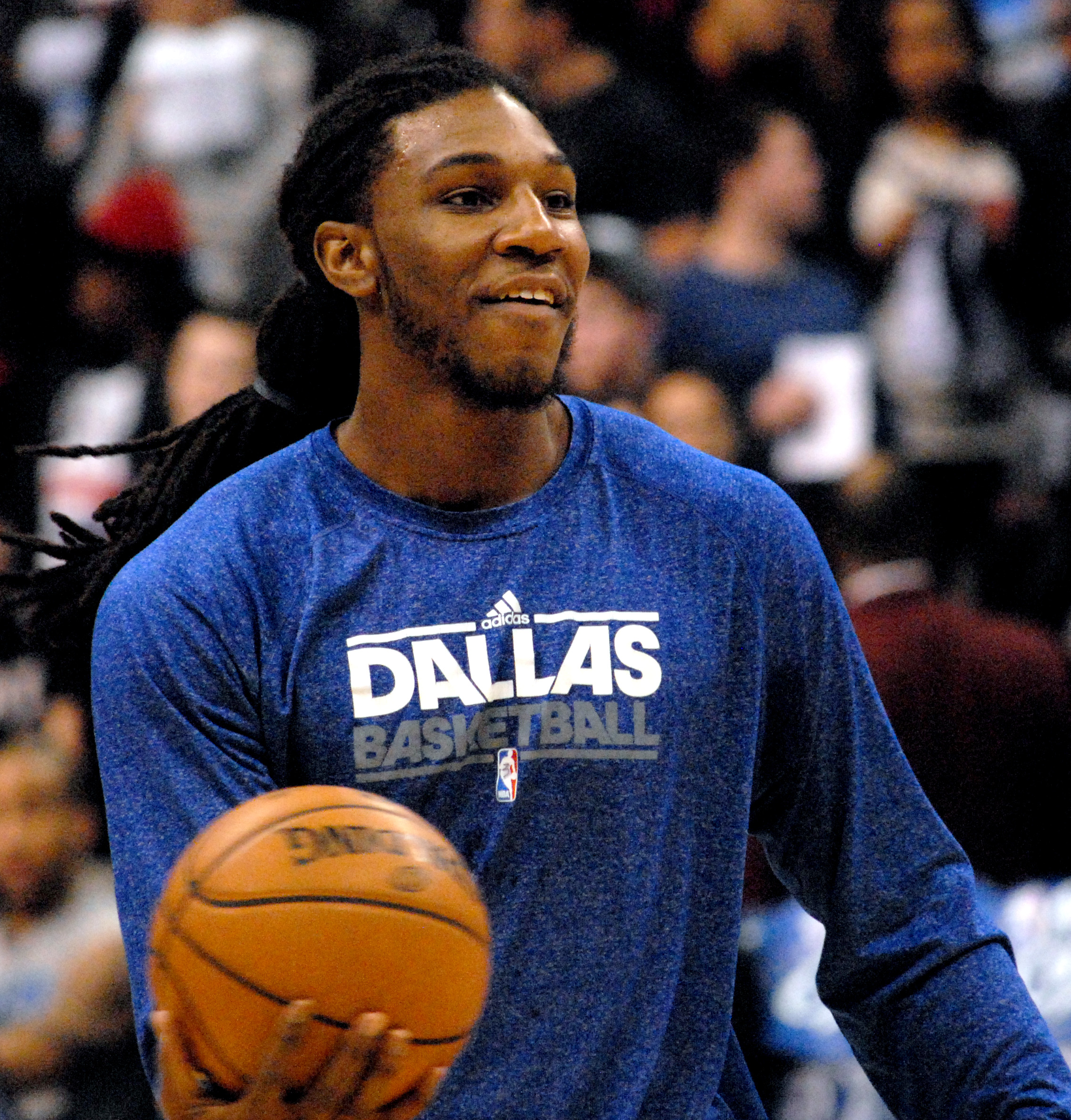
Crowder with the Dallas Mavericks in 2012

After finishing his college career, Crowder decided to enter the 2012 NBA draft, where he was projected to be a second-round pick. Crowder was taken 34th overall by the Cleveland Cavaliers; however, a draft night-trade with the Mavericks sent him to Dallas, along with 24th overall pick Jared Cunningham and 33rd overall pick Bernard James, in exchange for 17th overall pick Tyler Zeller and Kelenna Azubuike. He was officially signed on July 20, 2012, on a non-guaranteed two-year contract, like all second round draft picks. His Marquette teammate Darius Johnson-Odom was also drafted with the 55th overall pick.

Due to his strong showing in NBA Summer League and preseason games, he was described as "the steal of the NBA draft", averaging 11.4 points, 4.5 rebounds, 1.9 steals, 1.6 assists and 0.8 blocks in 22 minutes per game in the preseason and 16.6 points, 1.6 assists, 5.4 rebounds, 0.8 blocks, 2.0 steals and 41.7 percent shooting in Summer League, where he was also voted into the All-Summer League team. This strong showing raised expectations in the young player, as he was viewed as possibly the Mavericks' new franchise player and possibly a future All-Star.

His stellar play earned him a spot in coach Rick Carlisle's rotation. He debuted in the season-opening win against the Los Angeles Lakers. After Dirk Nowitzki missed most of the early season with an arthroscopic knee surgery and starting small forward Shawn Marion was also injured, Crowder became the team's starting small forward. With Marion and Nowitzki's returns, Crowder's minutes decreased. His contribution started to dwindle around the all-star break, when he admitted that he hit the "rookie wall". The Mavericks were never able to recover from Nowitzki's injury and missed the playoffs for the first time in 12 years, with Crowder averaging 5 points and 2.4 rebounds per game in 17.3 minutes.

On November 5, 2013, Crowder scored a then career-high 18 points in a 123–104 win over the Los Angeles Lakers. On February 27, 2014, Crowder was assigned to the Texas Legends of the NBA Development League. He was recalled by the Mavericks on February 28, reassigned on March 1, and recalled again on March 2.

On June 10, 2014, the Mavericks exercised their team option on Crowder's contract. With the offseason additions of forwards Al-Farouq Aminu and Richard Jefferson, Crowder's minutes subsequently dropped to start the 2014–15 season, falling out of coach Rick Carlisle's frontcourt rotation. On November 9, 2014, he scored a season-high 15 points on 5-of-6 shooting in a 105–96 loss to the Miami Heat.

=== Boston Celtics (2014–2017) ===
On December 18, 2014, Crowder was traded, along with Jameer Nelson, Brandan Wright, a 2015 first-round pick, a 2016 second-round pick and a $12.9 million trade exception, to the Boston Celtics in exchange for Rajon Rondo and Dwight Powell. On January 12, 2015, he scored a then career-high 22 points in a 108–100 win over the New Orleans Pelicans. On April 14, 2015, he hit an off-balance fall-away two-point shot from deep on the right wing with 0.8 seconds left, lifting Boston to a 95–93 win over the Toronto Raptors. After averaging just 3.6 points in 10.6 minutes per game with Dallas to start the 2014–15 season, Crowder became an important role player for the Celtics in Brad Stevens' rotation, and subsequently lifted his averages to 9.5 points in 24.2 minutes per game.

On July 27, 2015, Crowder re-signed with the Celtics on a reported five-year, $35 million contract. On December 18, 2015, he scored a career-high 24 points in a loss to the Atlanta Hawks. He topped that mark on January 4, 2016, scoring 25 points in a 103–94 win over the Brooklyn Nets. On January 13, he tied his career high of 25 points in a 103–94 win over the Indiana Pacers. On March 14, he was ruled out for two weeks with a right ankle sprain. He returned to action on March 31 against the Portland Trail Blazers after missing eight games.

In the Celtics' season opener on October 26, 2016, Crowder scored 21 points in a 122–117 win over the Brooklyn Nets. He appeared in the team's first four games of the season, but then missed eight straight games with a sprained left ankle. He returned to action on November 19, scoring nine points in a 94–92 win over the Detroit Pistons. On March 17, 2017, he recorded season highs with 24 points and 12 rebounds in a 98–95 win over Brooklyn. On March 26, 2017, he set a new season high with 25 points in a 112–108 win over the Miami Heat. In Game 1 of the Celtics' Eastern Conference semifinal match-up with the Washington Wizards, Crowder scored a playoff career-high 24 points, helping the Celtics win 123–111.

=== Cleveland Cavaliers (2017–2018) ===
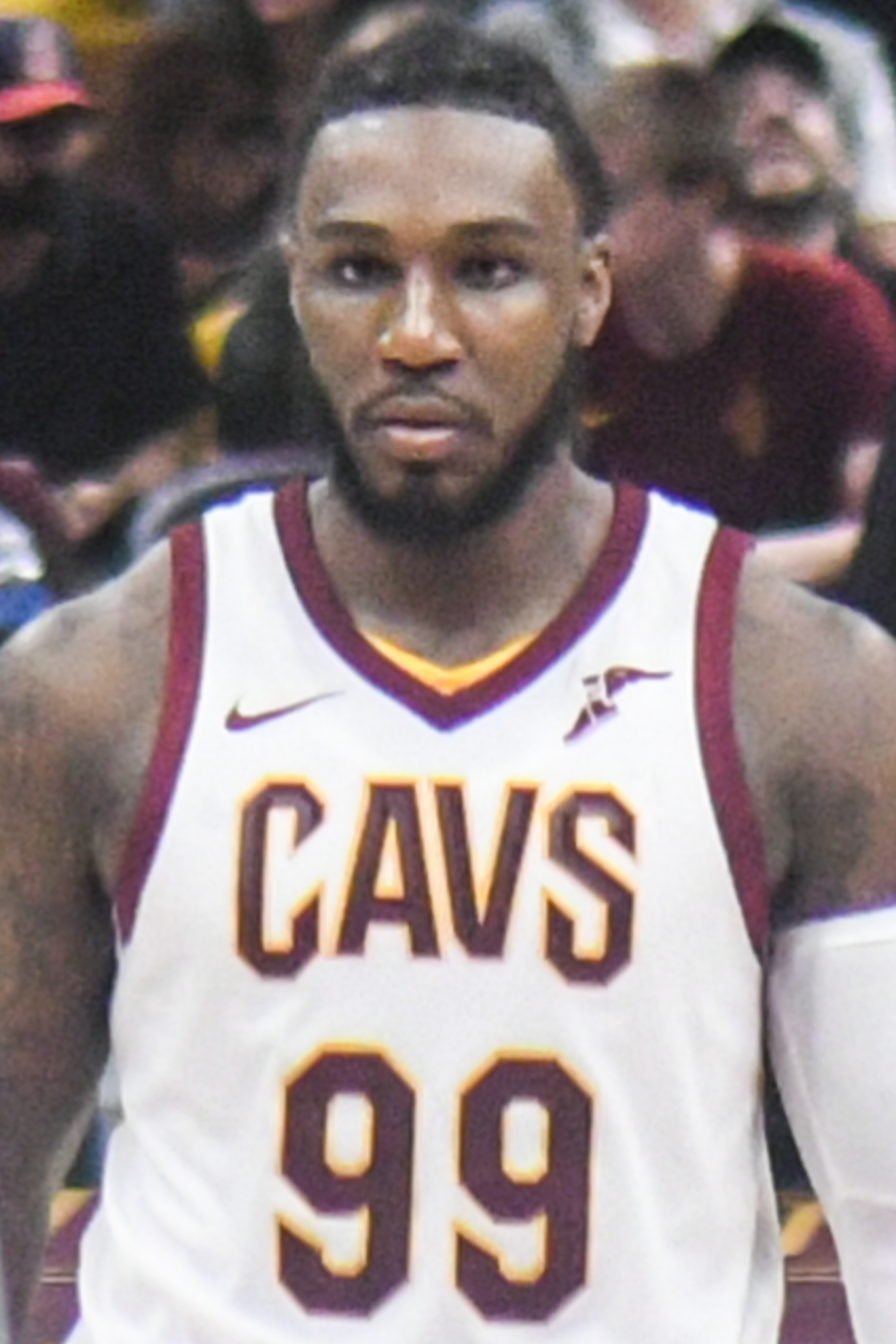
Crowder during his stint with the Cleveland Cavaliers in 2017

On August 22, 2017, Crowder was traded, along with Isaiah Thomas, Ante Žižić and the Brooklyn Nets' 2018 unprotected first-round pick, to the Cleveland Cavaliers in exchange for Kyrie Irving. Eight days later, the Celtics agreed to send the Cavaliers a 2020 second-round draft pick via the Miami Heat to complete the trade. On November 20, 2017, Crowder scored a season-high 18 points against the Detroit Pistons.

=== Utah Jazz (2018–2019) ===
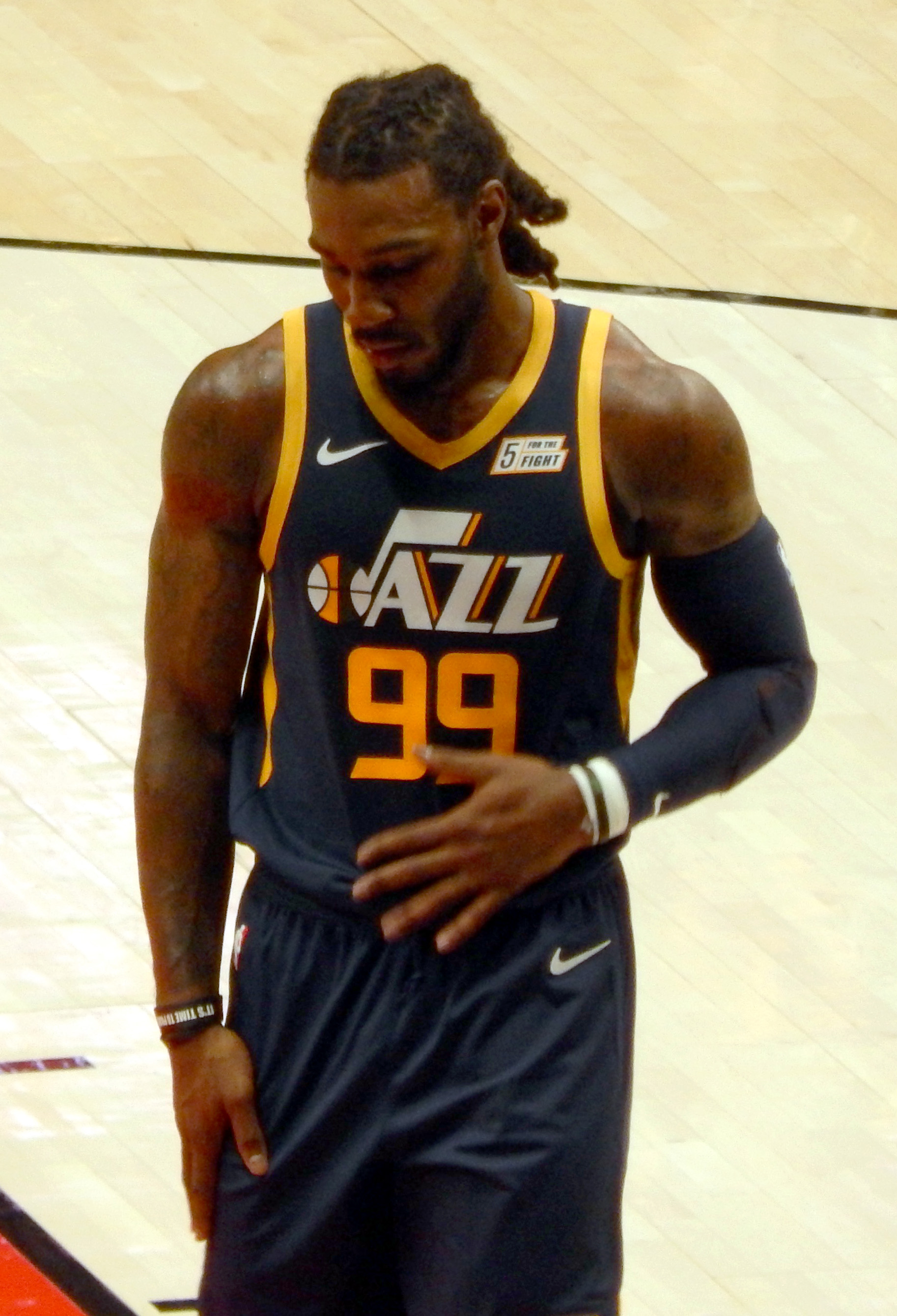
Crowder with the Utah Jazz in 2018

On February 8, 2018, Crowder was acquired by the Utah Jazz in a three-team trade that also involved the Cavaliers and the Sacramento Kings. In his debut for the Jazz three days later, Crowder scored 15 points in a 115–96 win over the Portland Trail Blazers. On March 9, 2018, he scored a season-high 22 points in a 95–78 win over the Memphis Grizzlies. In Game 5 of the Jazz's first-round playoff series against the Oklahoma City Thunder, Crowder scored a career playoff-high 27 points in a 107–99 loss.

On January 1, 2019, Crowder scored a career-high 30 points in a 122–116 loss to the Toronto Raptors.

=== Memphis Grizzlies (2019–2020) ===
On July 6, 2019, the Memphis Grizzlies acquired Crowder from the Jazz, along with Grayson Allen, Kyle Korver and draft picks for Mike Conley Jr. He made his Grizzlies debut on October 23, recording 13 points, five rebounds and two assists in a 120–101 loss to the Miami Heat. On October 27, Crowder hit the buzzer beating, game-winning three-pointer to defeat the Brooklyn Nets 134–133 in overtime. He finished the game with six points, seven rebounds, five assists and two blocks. On January 4, 2020, Crowder scored a season-high 27 points, alongside eight rebounds, seven assists, three steals and three blocks in a 140–114 win over the Los Angeles Clippers.

=== Miami Heat (2020) ===
On February 6, 2020, Crowder was traded to the Miami Heat in a 3-team trade. The trade reunited Crowder with his former college teammate Jimmy Butler. On February 9, Crowder made his Heat debut, recording 18 points, eleven rebounds, three assists and two steals in a 115–109 loss to the Portland Trail Blazers. In the 2020 Eastern Conference Finals, Crowder scored 22 points in a 117–114 Game 1 win over the Boston Celtics. The Heat eventually won the series in six games and advanced to the NBA Finals for the first time since 2014. In the Finals, Crowder and the Heat lost in 6 games to the Los Angeles Lakers.

=== Phoenix Suns (2020–2023) ===
On November 28, 2020, Crowder signed a 3-year, $30 million contract with the Phoenix Suns. He made his Suns debut on December 23, recording four points, nine rebounds and four assists in a 106–102 win over the Dallas Mavericks. On April 12, 2021, Crowder scored a season-high 26 points, alongside two rebounds and two assists, in a 126–120 win over the Houston Rockets. The Suns qualified for the postseason for the first time since 2010.

On June 22, 2021, in Game 2 of the Western Conference Finals, with 0.9 seconds remaining in regulation, Crowder inbounded the ball from behind the baseline to Deandre Ayton for a buzzer-beating, game-winning alley-oop dunk to lift the Suns to a 104–103 victory over the Los Angeles Clippers. In Game 6 of the series, Crowder scored 19 points in a decisive 130–103 win that sent Phoenix to the Finals for the first time since 1993. In the Finals, he was the only player on either team with Finals experience. The Suns lost to the Milwaukee Bucks in six games.

On December 6, 2021, Crowder scored a season-high 19 points, alongside six rebounds, in a 108–104 win over the San Antonio Spurs. On March 6, 2022, he again scored 19 points, alongside five rebounds and seven assists, in a 132–122 loss to the Milwaukee Bucks. The Suns qualified for the playoffs yet again, but were eliminated in seven games by the Dallas Mavericks in the second round.

On September 25, 2022, Crowder and the Suns mutually agreed to let Crowder sit out for the 2022–23 season until the Suns found a suitable trade partner for him.

=== Milwaukee Bucks (2023–2024) ===
On February 9, 2023, Crowder was acquired by the Milwaukee Bucks from the Suns as part of a four-team trade that also included the Brooklyn Nets and Indiana Pacers, where Kevin Durant was acquired by the Suns. On April 4, 2023, Crowder recorded 19 points and nine rebounds during his first start for the Bucks in a 140–128 win over the Washington Wizards. Three days later, he had a season-high 24 points in a 137–114 loss to the Memphis Grizzlies.

On July 9, 2023, Crowder re-signed with the Bucks. On February 8, 2024, he recorded season highs of 21 points, eight rebounds, and five assists in a 129–105 loss to the Minnesota Timberwolves.

=== Sacramento Kings (2024–2025) ===
On November 27, 2024, Crowder signed with the Sacramento Kings. Crowder made nine appearances (including two starts) for Sacramento during the 2024–25 NBA season, recording averages of 2.6 points, 2.2 rebounds, and 0.7 assists.

=== Vaqueros de Bayamon (2026) ===
On March 18, 2026, it was announced that Crowder signed a deal to play for the reigning champions Vaqueros de Bayamon in Puerto Rico's Baloncesto Superior Nacional. On April 2, he debuted for the team, logging nine points, one rebound, and one assist in 20 minutes. On April 24, Crowder recorded his second double-double of the season, scoring 25 points and grabbing 10 rebounds, helping secure a 109-87 victory over the Cangrejeros de Santurce. He was selected to participate in the 2026 BSN All-Star Game. On July 9, 2026, Bayamón announced that Crowder would not be available for the 2026 BSN Playoffs and would subsequently be released from the team.

=== ASVEL (2026–present) ===
On August 20, 2026, Crowder signed a one-year contract with ASVEL of the French LNB Élite and the EuroLeague.

== Career statistics ==
Legend
GP	Games played	GS	Games started	MPG	Minutes per game
FG%	Field goal percentage	3P%	3-point field goal percentage	FT%	Free throw percentage
RPG	Rebounds per game	APG	Assists per game	SPG	Steals per game
BPG	Blocks per game	PPG	Points per game	**Bold**	Career high

=== NBA ===
==== Regular season ====
Year	Team	GP	GS	MPG	FG%	3P%	FT%	RPG	APG	SPG	BPG	PPG
2012–13	Dallas	78	16	17.3	.384	.328	.644	2.4	1.2	.8	.2	5.0
2013–14	Dallas	78	8	16.1	.439	.331	.754	2.5	.8	.8	.3	4.6
2014–15	Dallas	25	0	10.6	.434	.342	**.909**	1.2	.5	.6	.2	3.6
2014–15	Boston	57	17	24.2	.418	.282	.762	4.6	1.4	1.0	.4	9.5
2015–16	Boston	73	**73**	31.6	.443	.336	.820	5.1	1.8	**1.7**	**.5**	**14.2**
2016–17	Boston	72	72	**32.4**	.463	.398	.811	5.8	2.2	1.0	.3	13.9
2017–18	Cleveland	53	47	25.4	.418	.328	.848	3.3	1.1	.8	.2	8.6
2017–18	Utah	27	0	27.6	.386	.316	.768	3.8	1.5	.9	.3	11.8
2018–19	Utah	**80**	11	27.1	.399	.331	.721	4.8	1.7	.8	.4	11.9
2019–20	Memphis	45	45	29.4	.368	.293	.789	**6.2**	**2.8**	1.0	.3	9.9
2019–20	Miami	20	8	27.7	**.482**	**.445**	.733	5.4	1.8	1.3	**.5**	11.9
2020–21	Phoenix	60	42	27.5	.404	.389	.760	4.7	2.1	.8	**.5**	10.1
2021–22	Phoenix	67	67	28.1	.399	.348	.789	5.3	1.9	1.4	.4	9.4
2022–23	Milwaukee	18	3	18.9	.479	.436	.833	3.8	1.5	.7	.3	6.9
2023–24	Milwaukee	50	25	23.1	.422	.349	.722	3.2	1.3	.8	.2	6.2
2024–25	Sacramento	9	2	11.4	.318	.267	.833	2.2	.7	.3	.0	2.6
Career		812	436	24.8	.418	.347	.777	4.2	1.6	1.0	.3	9.3

==== Playoffs ====
Year	Team	GP	GS	MPG	FG%	3P%	FT%	RPG	APG	SPG	BPG	PPG
2014	Dallas	7	0	11.6	.444	**.429**	.000	1.7	.3	.3	.1	2.7
2015	Boston	4	1	25.1	**.517**	.300	.769	5.0	2.0	1.0	**.8**	10.8
2016	Boston	6	6	32.9	.278	.244	.636	**6.5**	2.2	**1.5**	.5	9.5
2017	Boston	18	18	**33.1**	.435	.352	.833	6.4	**2.7**	1.1	.3	**13.6**
2018	Utah	11	2	29.4	.324	.333	.643	5.1	1.7	1.4	.2	10.0
2019	Utah	5	3	26.0	.370	.300	.737	5.8	.8	1.0	.0	10.0
2020	Miami	21	21	31.4	.403	.342	.761	5.6	1.9	.7	.6	12.0
2021	Phoenix	**22**	**22**	**33.1**	.413	.380	.886	6.1	1.9	.9	**.8**	10.8
2022	Phoenix	13	13	29.5	.400	.302	.731	4.7	2.4	1.0	.5	9.4
2023	Milwaukee	4	0	10.2	.231	.000	.500	1.0	.8	.5	.0	1.8
2024	Milwaukee	4	0	10.5	.250	.143	**1.000**	1.5	.5	.0	.5	2.3
Career		115	86	28.6	.392	.333	.770	5.2	1.8	.9	.5	10.1

=== College ===
Year	Team	GP	GS	MPG	FG%	3P%	FT%	RPG	APG	SPG	BPG	PPG
2010–11	Marquette	**37**	17	27.6	.485	**.359**	.616	6.8	1.6	1.3	.9	11.8
2011–12	Marquette	35	**35**	**32.9**	**.498**	.345	**.735**	**8.4**	**2.1**	**2.5**	**1.0**	**17.5**
Career		72	52	30.2	.492	.350	.683	7.6	1.8	1.9	.9	14.6

=== Baloncesto Superior Nacional ===
Year	Team	GP	GS	MPG	FG%	3P%	FT%	RPG	APG	SPG	BPG	PPG
2026	Bayamón	29	29	26.5	.415	.314	.767	5.8	2.9	1.4	.5	14.5

== Player profile ==
Crowder averaged .498 from the field and .345 from the three-point line in his senior season at Marquette. Crowder grew from a chubby kid into a muscular player, training with intense will and commitment to improve his skills. Rick Carlisle compared him to Tayshaun Prince, whom he coached while with the Detroit Pistons, stating: "Jae just has a maturity beyond his years. He's got a natural motor and a natural, real, pure basketball energy. He's the kind of guy who would fit in on any team."

== Personal life ==
Crowder's father, Corey, played in the NBA for the Utah Jazz and the San Antonio Spurs and had a 14-year professional basketball career, mostly playing in Europe. Crowder has seven siblings. He majored in communication studies at Marquette's Diederich College of Communication.

Crowder's mother Helen Thompson died of cancer in August 2017. She died the same night he was traded to Cleveland from Boston. At his introductory press conference in Cleveland, he said, "The good thing about the whole ordeal was I was able to whisper it to my mom before she passed. I was with her. I just told her, 'We're going to Cleveland.' Five minutes later, she passed."

== See also ==
- List of second-generation NBA players
