= 2015–16 Sacramento Kings season =

NBA professional basketball team season

- Head coach: George Karl
- General manager: Vlade Divac
- Owner: Vivek Ranadive
- Arena: Sleep Train Arena

Results
- Record: 33–49 (.402)
- Place: Division: 3rd (Pacific); Conference: 10th (Western)
- Playoff finish: Did not qualify
- Stats at Basketball Reference

Local media
- Television: Comcast Sports Net California; KXTV
- Radio: KHTK Sports 1140

The 2015–16 Sacramento Kings season was the 71st season of the franchise, its 67th season in the National Basketball Association (NBA), and its 31st in Sacramento. It was also their final season playing in the Sleep Train Arena (their home since 1988), as the Kings moved to the new Golden 1 Center in Downtown Sacramento the following season. It was also the final full–season for DeMarcus Cousins played for the Kings' before being traded to the New Orleans Pelicans midway through next season.

Following seven consecutive seasons with fewer than 30 victories, an ignominy previously suffered only by the Vancouver/Memphis Grizzlies franchise between 1995–96 and 2002–03 and by the Kings themselves between 1986–87 and 1993–94, the Kings improved by four wins to finish 33–49. It was the first time since 2004–05 that the Kings were out of the bottom two in the Pacific Division, but the team remained eight wins short of a playoff berth. This season was also the first since 2007-08 where the Kings had won at least 40% of their games and prevented another 50 loss season. Following the season, veteran George Karl was fired as head coach, one game shy of his 2,000th NBA game as head coach, and replaced by Dave Joerger and Rajon Rondo signed as a free agent with the Chicago Bulls.

== Draft picks ==
Round	Pick	Player	Position	Nationality	College
1	6	Willie Cauley-Stein	C	United States	Kentucky

== Roster ==
2015–16 Sacramento Kings roster
Players

Pos.	No.	Player	Height	Weight	DOB	From
PF	13	Quincy Acy	6 ft 7 in (2.01 m)	240 lb (109 kg)	1990-10-06	Baylor
SG	5	James Anderson	6 ft 6 in (1.98 m)	213 lb (97 kg)	1989-03-25	Oklahoma State
SG	3	Marco Belinelli	6 ft 5 in (1.96 m)	210 lb (95 kg)	1986-03-25	Italy
SF	31	Caron Butler	6 ft 7 in (2.01 m)	228 lb (103 kg)	1980-03-13	Connecticut
SF	18	Omri Casspi	6 ft 9 in (2.06 m)	225 lb (102 kg)	1988-06-22	Israel
C	00	Willie Cauley-Stein	7 ft 1 in (2.16 m)	240 lb (109 kg)	1993-08-18	Kentucky
PG	7	Darren Collison	6 ft 0 in (1.83 m)	175 lb (79 kg)	1987-08-23	UCLA
C	15	DeMarcus Cousins	6 ft 11 in (2.11 m)	270 lb (122 kg)	1990-08-13	Kentucky
SG	30	Seth Curry	6 ft 2 in (1.88 m)	185 lb (84 kg)	1990-08-23	Duke
SF	26	Duje Dukan	6 ft 10 in (2.08 m)	218 lb (99 kg)	1991-12-04	Wisconsin
SF	8	Rudy Gay	6 ft 8 in (2.03 m)	230 lb (104 kg)	1986-08-17	Connecticut
C	41	Kosta Koufos	7 ft 0 in (2.13 m)	265 lb (120 kg)	1989-02-24	Ohio State
SG	23	Ben McLemore	6 ft 5 in (1.96 m)	195 lb (88 kg)	1993-02-11	Kansas
PF	25	Eric Moreland	6 ft 10 in (2.08 m)	238 lb (108 kg)	1991-12-24	Oregon State
PG	9	Rajon Rondo	6 ft 1 in (1.85 m)	186 lb (84 kg)	1986-02-22	Kentucky

Coaches
Head coach
- George Karl
Assistant(s)
- Anthony Carter
- Chad Iske
- Nancy Lieberman
- John Welch
- Corliss Williamson

Legend
- (DP) Unsigned draft pick
- (FA) Free agent
- (S) Suspended
- (DL) On assignment to D-League affiliate
- Injured

Roster
Updated: 2016–04–14

== Standings ==
Pacific Division	W	L	PCT	GB	Home	Road	Div	GP
z – Golden State Warriors	73	9	.890	–	39‍–‍2	34‍–‍7	15–1	82
x – Los Angeles Clippers	53	29	.646	20.0	29‍–‍12	24‍–‍17	9–7	82
e – Sacramento Kings	33	49	.402	40.0	18‍–‍23	15‍–‍26	8–8	82
e – Phoenix Suns	23	59	.280	50.0	14‍–‍27	9‍–‍32	6–10	82
e – Los Angeles Lakers	17	65	.207	56.0	12‍–‍29	5‍–‍36	2–14	82

Western Conference
#	Team	W	L	PCT	GB	GP
1	z – Golden State Warriors *	73	9	.890	–	82
2	y – San Antonio Spurs *	67	15	.817	6.0	82
3	y – Oklahoma City Thunder *	55	27	.671	18.0	82
4	x – Los Angeles Clippers	53	29	.646	20.0	82
5	x – Portland Trail Blazers	44	38	.537	29.0	82
6	x – Dallas Mavericks	42	40	.512	31.0	82
7	x – Memphis Grizzlies	42	40	.512	31.0	82
8	x – Houston Rockets	41	41	.500	32.0	82
9	e – Utah Jazz	40	42	.488	33.0	82
10	e – Sacramento Kings	33	49	.402	40.0	82
11	e – Denver Nuggets	33	49	.402	40.0	82
12	e – New Orleans Pelicans	30	52	.366	43.0	82
13	e – Minnesota Timberwolves	29	53	.354	44.0	82
14	e – Phoenix Suns	23	59	.280	50.0	82
15	e – Los Angeles Lakers	17	65	.207	56.0	82

== Regular season game log ==
2015–16 game log
Total: 33–49 (Home: 18–23; Road: 15–26)
October: 1–2 (home: 1–1; road: 0–1)

Game	Date	Team	Score	High points	High rebounds	High assists	Location Attendance	Record
1	October 28	L.A. Clippers	L 104–111	DeMarcus Cousins (32)	DeMarcus Cousins (13)	Marco Belinelli (7)	Sleep Train Arena; 17,458	0–1
2	October 30	L.A. Lakers	W 132–114	Cousins & Rondo (21)	DeMarcus Cousins (11)	Rajon Rondo (8)	Sleep Train Arena; 17,391	1–1
3	October 31	@ L.A. Clippers	L 109–114	Rajon Rondo (21)	Gay, Cousins & Cauley-Stein (9)	Rajon Rondo (8)	Staples Center; 19,060	1–2

November : 6–10 (home: 4–5; road: 2–5)

Game	Date	Team	Score	High points	High rebounds	High assists	Location Attendance	Record
4	November 3	Memphis	L 89–103	Rudy Gay (19)	Willie Cauley-Stein (7)	Rajon Rondo (4)	Sleep Train Arena; 17,317	1–3
5	November 4	@ Phoenix	L 97–118	Kosta Koufos (16)	Rudy Gay (8)	Collison, Rondo (6)	Talking Stick Resort Arena; 16,497	1–4
6	November 6	Houston	L 110–116	Casspi, Collison (22)	Willie Cauley-Stein (9)	Darren Collison (9)	Sleep Train Arena; 16,983	1–5
7	November 7	Golden State	L 94–103	Rudy Gay (22)	Rajon Rondo (12)	Rajon Rondo (15)	Sleep Train Arena; 17,317	1–6
8	November 9	San Antonio	L 88–106	DeMarcus Cousins (21)	DeMarcus Cousins (12)	Rajon Rondo (10)	Sleep Train Arena; 17,317	1–7
9	November 11	Detroit	W 101–92	DeMarcus Cousins (33)	Casspi, Rondo (11)	Rajon Rondo (15)	Sleep Train Arena; 17,317	2–7
10	November 13	Brooklyn	W 111–109	DeMarcus Cousins (40)	DeMarcus Cousins (13)	Rajon Rondo (14)	Sleep Train Arena; 17,131	3–7
11	November 15	Toronto	W 107–101	DeMarcus Cousins (36)	DeMarcus Cousins (10)	Rajon Rondo (14)	Sleep Train Arena; 17,006	4–7
12	November 18	@ Atlanta	L 97–103	DeMarcus Cousins (24)	Cousins, Rondo (12)	Rajon Rondo (12)	Philips Arena; 13,008	4–8
13	November 19	@ Miami	L 109–116	Marco Belinelli (23)	Rudy Gay (12)	Rajon Rondo (18)	American Airlines Arena; 19,600	4–9
14	November 21	@ Orlando	W 97–91	DeMarcus Cousins (29)	DeMarcus Cousins (12)	Rajon Rondo (9)	Amway Center; 16,104	5–9
15	November 23	@ Charlotte	L 122–127 (OT)	DeMarcus Cousins (30)	DeMarcus Cousins (11)	Rajon Rondo (20)	Time Warner Cable Arena; 14,163	5–10
16	November 25	@ Milwaukee	W 129–118	Rudy Gay (36)	Koufos, Rondo (9)	Rajon Rondo (13)	BMO Harris Bradley Center; 14,120	6–10
17	November 27	Minnesota	L 91–101	Marco Belinelli (17)	Kosta Koufos (13)	Rajon Rondo (16)	Sleep Train Arena; 17,317	6–11
18	November 28	@ Golden State	L 101–120	Rudy Gay (20)	Acy, Casspi, Gay, Koufos (7)	Rajon Rondo (7)	Oracle Arena; 19,596	6–12
19	November 30	Dallas	W 112–98	DeMarcus Cousins (31)	DeMarcus Cousins (9)	DeMarcus Cousins (6)	Sleep Train Arena; 16,937	7–12

December : 5–8 (home: 3–3; road: 2–5)

Game	Date	Team	Score	High points	High rebounds	High assists	Location Attendance	Record
20	December 3	Boston	L 97–114	Rudy Gay (18)	Kosta Koufos (10)	Rajon Rondo (8)	Mexico City Arena (Mexico City, MX/NBA Global Games); 18,660	7–13
21	December 5	@ Houston	L 113–120	Ben McLemore (19)	Kosta Koufos (12)	Rajon Rondo (19)	Toyota Center; 17,318	7–14
22	December 6	@ Oklahoma City	L 95–98	Rudy Gay (20)	DeMarcus Cousins (10)	Rajon Rondo (10)	Chesapeake Energy Arena; 18,203	7–15
23	December 8	Utah	W 114–106	Cousins, Gay (23)	DeMarcus Cousins (12)	Rajon Rondo (13)	Sleep Train Arena; 16,505	8–15
24	December 10	New York	W 99–97	DeMarcus Cousins (27)	DeMarcus Cousins (11)	Rajon Rondo (12)	Sleep Train Arena; 17,317	9–15
25	December 15	Houston	W 107–97	DeMarcus Cousins (26)	Rudy Gay (13)	Darren Collison (13)	Sleep Train Arena; 17,317	10–15
26	December 18	@ Minnesota	L 95–99	DeMarcus Cousins (24)	DeMarcus Cousins (11)	Rajon Rondo (13)	Target Center; 12,770	10–16
27	December 20	@ Toronto	W 104–94	Gay, Rondo (18)	Omri Casspi (11)	Rajon Rondo (13)	Air Canada Centre; 19,800	11–16
28	December 21	@ Washington	L 99–113	DeMarcus Cousins (22)	Cousins, Rondo (8)	Rajon Rondo (9)	Verizon Center; 15,124	11–17
29	December 23	@ Indiana	W 108–106	DeMarcus Cousins (25)	DeMarcus Cousins (16)	Rajon Rondo (16)	Bankers Life Fieldhouse; 18,165	12–17
30	December 27	Portland	L 94–98	DeMarcus Cousins (36)	Rudy Gay (14)	Rajon Rondo (15)	Sleep Train Arena; 17,317	12–18
31	December 28	@ Golden State	L 103–122	Omri Casspi (36)	Quincy Acy (10)	Darren Collison (11)	Oracle Arena; 19,596	12–19
32	December 30	Philadelphia	L 105–110	DeMarcus Cousins (21)	Casspi, Cousins (11)	Rajon Rondo (14)	Sleep Train Arena; 17,317	12–20

January : 8–7 (home: 4–3; road: 4–4)

Game	Date	Team	Score	High points	High rebounds	High assists	Location Attendance	Record
33	January 2	Phoenix	W 142–119	DeMarcus Cousins (32)	DeMarcus Cousins (9)	Rajon Rondo (15)	Sleep Train Arena; 17,317	13–20
34	January 4	@ Oklahoma City	W 116–104	DeMarcus Cousins (33)	DeMarcus Cousins (19)	Rajon Rondo (18)	Chesapeake Energy Arena; 18,203	14–20
35	January 5	@ Dallas	L 116–117 (2OT)	DeMarcus Cousins (35)	DeMarcus Cousins (17)	Darren Collison (12)	American Airlines Center; 20,059	14–21
36	January 7	L. A. Lakers	W 118–115	DeMarcus Cousins (29)	DeMarcus Cousins (10)	Rajon Rondo (12)	Sleep Train Arena; 17,386	15–21
37	January 9	Golden State	L 116–128	DeMarcus Cousins (33)	DeMarcus Cousins (10)	Rajon Rondo (12)	Sleep Train Arena; 17,317	15–22
38	January 13	New Orleans	L 97–109	DeMarcus Cousins (32)	DeMarcus Cousins (12)	Rajon Rondo (10)	Sleep Train Arena; 17,317	15–23
39	January 14	@ Utah	W 103–101	DeMarcus Cousins (36)	DeMarcus Cousins (17)	Rajon Rondo (13)	Vivint Smart Home Arena; 17,894	16–23
40	January 16	@ L. A. Clippers	W 110–103	DeMarcus Cousins (19)	DeMarcus Cousins (10)	Rajon Rondo (10)	Staples Center; 19,191	17–23
41	January 20	@ L. A. Lakers	W 112–93	DeMarcus Cousins (36)	DeMarcus Cousins (16)	Rajon Rondo (17)	Staples Center; 18,997	18–23
42	January 21	Atlanta	W 91–88	DeMarcus Cousins (24)	DeMarcus Cousins (15)	Rajon Rondo (11)	Sleep Train Arena; 17,019	19–23
43	January 23	Indiana	W 108–97	DeMarcus Cousins (48)	DeMarcus Cousins (13)	Rajon Rondo (10)	Sleep Train Arena; 17,419	20–23
44	January 25	Charlotte	L 128–129 (2OT)	DeMarcus Cousins (56)	DeMarcus Cousins (12)	Rajon Rondo (20)	Sleep Train Arena; 16,991	20–24
45	January 26	@ Portland	L 97–112	DeMarcus Cousins (17)	Omri Casspi (8)	Rajon Rondo (11)	Moda Center; 19,393	20–25
46	January 28	@ New Orleans	L 105–114	Cousins, McLemore (26)	DeMarcus Cousins (10)	Rajon Rondo (15)	Smoothie King Center; 15,636	20–26
47	January 30	@ Memphis	L 117–121	Rudy Gay (21)	DeMarcus Cousins (14)	Rajon Rondo (8)	FedExForum; 18,119	20–27

February : 4–7 (home: 2–4; road: 2–3)

Game	Date	Team	Score	High points	High rebounds	High assists	Location Attendance	Record
48	February 1	Milwaukee	W 111–104	Rudy Gay (32)	Kosta Koufos (12)	Rajon Rondo (7)	Sleep Train Arena; 16,827	21–27
49	February 3	Chicago	L 102–107	DeMarcus Cousins (30)	DeMarcus Cousins (11)	Rajon Rondo (9)	Sleep Train Arena; 17,317	21–28
50	February 5	@ Brooklyn	L 119–128	Darren Collison (25)	DeMarcus Cousins (10)	Rajon Rondo (15)	Barclays Center; 14,432	21–29
51	February 7	@ Boston	L 119–128	DeMarcus Cousins (31)	DeMarcus Cousins (7)	Rajon Rondo (15)	TD Garden; 18,624	21–30
52	February 8	@ Cleveland	L 100–120	Casspi, Gay (16)	Cousins, Rondo (8)	Rajon Rondo (16)	Quicken Loans Arena; 20,562	21–31
53	February 10	@ Philadelphia	W 114–110	DeMarcus Cousins (28)	DeMarcus Cousins (12)	Rajon Rondo (15)	Wells Fargo Center; 12,501	22–31
All-Star Break
54	February 19	Denver	W 116–110	DeMarcus Cousins (37)	DeMarcus Cousins (20)	Rajon Rondo (9)	Sleep Train Arena; 17,317	23–31
55	February 23	@ Denver	W 114–110	DeMarcus Cousins (39)	Rudy Gay (10)	Rajon Rondo (12)	Pepsi Center; 15,721	24–31
56	February 24	San Antonio	L 92–108	DeMarcus Cousins (22)	DeMarcus Cousins (10)	Rajon Rondo (18)	Sleep Train Arena; 17,317	24–32
57	February 26	L. A. Clippers	L 107–117	DeMarcus Cousins (26)	DeMarcus Cousins (15)	DeMarcus Cousins (9)	Sleep Train Arena; 17,317	24–33
58	February 29	Oklahoma City	L 116–131	DeMarcus Cousins (35)	DeMarcus Cousins (12)	Rajon Rondo (12)	Sleep Train Arena; 17,317	24–34

March : 6–11 (home: 3–4; road: 3–7)

Game	Date	Team	Score	High points	High rebounds	High assists	Location Attendance	Record
59	March 2	@ Memphis	L 98–104	DeMarcus Cousins (18)	DeMarcus Cousins (16)	Rajon Rondo (17)	FedExForum; 15,310	24–35
60	March 3	@ Dallas	W 104–101	DeMarcus Cousins (22)	DeMarcus Cousins (13)	Rajon Rondo (12)	American Airlines Center; 19,910	25–35
61	March 5	@ San Antonio	L 94–104	DeMarcus Cousins (31)	DeMarcus Cousins (9)	Rajon Rondo (8)	AT&T Center; 18,418	25–36
62	March 7	@ New Orleans	L 112–115	DeMarcus Cousins (40)	DeMarcus Cousins (16)	Rajon Rondo (10)	Smoothie King Center; 16,403	25–37
63	March 9	Cleveland	L 111–120	DeMarcus Cousins (29)	DeMarcus Cousins (11)	Darren Collison (8)	Sleep Train Arena; 17,317	25–38
64	March 11	Orlando	L 100–107	Kosta Koufos (19)	Rudy Gay (7)	Rajon Rondo (14)	Sleep Train Arena; 17,081	25–39
65	March 13	Utah	L 99–108	DeMarcus Cousins (31)	DeMarcus Cousins (10)	Darren Collison (9)	Sleep Train Arena; 17,023	25–40
66	March 15	@ L. A. Lakers	W 106–98	Collison, Cousins (22)	Cousins, Gay (8)	Rajon Rondo (12)	Staples Center; 18,997	26–40
67	March 16	New Orleans	L 108–123	Darren Collison (23)	DeMarcus Cousins (12)	Cousins, Curry (5)	Sleep Train Arena; 17,086	26–41
68	March 18	@ Detroit	L 108–115	DeMarcus Cousins (31)	DeMarcus Cousins (13)	Rajon Rondo (10)	The Palace of Auburn Hills; 15,982	26–42
69	March 20	@ New York	W 88–80	DeMarcus Cousins (24)	DeMarcus Cousins (20)	Collison, Rondo (6)	Madison Square Garden; 19,812	27–42
70	March 21	@ Chicago	L 102–109	Collison, Cousins (19)	DeMarcus Cousins (18)	Rajon Rondo (5)	United Center; 21,531	27–43
71	March 23	@ Minnesota	L 104–113	Rajon Rondo (25)	Kosta Koufos (15)	Rajon Rondo (12)	Target Center; 12,151	27–44
72	March 25	Phoenix	W 116–94	DeMarcus Cousins (29)	DeMarcus Cousins (11)	Rajon Rondo (12)	Sleep Train Arena; 17,317	28–44
73	March 27	Dallas	W 133–111	Willie Cauley-Stein (21)	DeMarcus Cousins (12)	Rajon Rondo (11)	Sleep Train Arena; 17,147	29–44
74	March 28	@ Portland	L 93–105	Seth Curry (21)	Willie Cauley-Stein (14)	Darren Collison (7)	Moda Center; 19,393	29–45
75	March 30	Washington	W 120–111	DeMarcus Cousins (29)	DeMarcus Cousins (10)	Rajon Rondo (11)	Sleep Train Arena; 17,185	30–45

April : 3–4 (home: 1–3; road: 2–1)

Game	Date	Team	Score	High points	High rebounds	High assists	Location Attendance	Record
76	April 1	Miami	L 106–112	Darren Collison (26)	Rudy Gay (13)	Rajon Rondo (10)	Sleep Train Arena; 17,317	30–46
77	April 2	@ Denver	W 115–106	Rudy Gay (25)	Gay, Cauley-Stein (9)	Darren Collison (8)	Pepsi Center; 15,607	31–46
78	April 5	Portland	L 107–115	DeMarcus Cousins (30)	Rajon Rondo (10)	Rajon Rondo (12)	Sleep Train Arena; 17,317	31–47
79	April 7	Minnesota	L 97–105	Darren Collison (19)	Rudy Gay (13)	Darren Collison (6)	Sleep Train Arena; 17,317	31–48
80	April 9	Oklahoma City	W 114–112	Darren Collison (27)	Rudy Gay (8)	Darren Collison (8)	Sleep Train Arena; 17,317	32–48
81	April 11	@ Phoenix	W 105–101	Seth Curry (20)	Kosta Koufos (8)	Seth Curry (15)	Talking Stick Resort Arena; 17,288	33–48
82	April 13	@ Houston	L 81–116	Ben McLemore (24)	Kosta Koufos (11)	James Anderson (5)	Toyota Center; 18,311	33–49

2015–16 season schedule

== Player statistics ==
Legend
GP	Games played	GS	Games started	MPG	Minutes per game
FG%	Field-goal percentage	3P%	3-point field-goal percentage	FT%	Free-throw percentage
RPG	Rebounds per game	APG	Assists per game	SPG	Steals per game
BPG	Blocks per game	PPG	Points per game

=== Regular season ===
Player	GP	GS	MPG	FG%	3P%	FT%	RPG	APG	SPG	BPG	PPG
Kosta Koufos	78	14	19.0	.532		.548	5.4	.4	.5	.9	6.8
Darren Collison	74	15	30.0	.486	.401	.858	2.3	4.3	1.0	.1	14.0
Rajon Rondo	72	72	35.2	.454	.365	.580	6.0	11.7	2.0	.1	11.9
Rudy Gay	70	70	34.0	.463	.344	.780	6.5	1.7	1.4	.7	17.2
Omri Casspi	69	21	27.2	.481	.409	.648	5.9	1.4	.8	.2	11.8
Ben McLemore	68	53	21.2	.429	.362	.718	2.2	1.2	.8	.1	7.8
Marco Belinelli	68	7	24.6	.386	.306	.833	1.7	1.9	.5	.0	10.2
Willie Cauley-Stein	66	39	21.4	.563	.000	.648	5.3	.6	.7	1.0	7.0
DeMarcus Cousins	65	65	34.6	.451	.333	.718	11.5	3.3	1.6	1.4	26.9
Quincy Acy	59	29	14.8	.556	.388	.735	3.2	.5	.5	.4	5.2
James Anderson	51	15	14.1	.376	.267	.759	1.7	.8	.4	.3	3.5
Seth Curry	44	9	15.7	.455	.450	.833	1.4	1.5	.5	.1	6.8
Caron Butler	17	1	10.4	.424	.167	.833	1.3	.6	.5	.1	3.7
Eric Moreland	8	0	6.0	.500		.500	1.4	.1	.0	.5	1.0
Duje Dukan	1	0	24.0	.200	.400		4.0	1.0	1.0	.0	6.0

== Transactions ==
=== Trades ===
July 9, 2015	To Sacramento Kings 2016 Second Round Draft Pick	To San Antonio Spurs Ray McCallum, Jr.
July 10, 2015	To Sacramento Kings Artūras Gudaitis Draft Rights; Luka Mitrović Draft Rights	To Philadelphia 76ers Nik Stauskas; Carl Landry; Jason Thompson; Future First Round Pick

=== Re-Signed ===
Player	Signed	Former Team
Omri Casspi	Signed 2-year contract worth $5.8 million	Sacramento Kings

==== Additions ====
Player	Signed	Former Team
Rajon Rondo	Signed 1-year contract worth $9.5 million	Dallas Mavericks
Marco Belinelli	Signed 3-year contract worth $19 million	San Antonio Spurs
Kosta Koufos	Signed 4-year contract worth $32 million	Memphis Grizzlies
James Anderson	Signed 2-year contract worth $2.1 million	(Lithuania) Žalgiris Kaunas
Quincy Acy	Signed 2-year contract worth $2 million	New York Knicks
Seth Curry	Signed 2-year contract worth $1.9 million	Erie Bayhawks
Duje Dukan	Signed 2-year contract worth $1.4 million	Wisconsin Badgers
Caron Butler	Signed 2-year contract worth $3 million	Detroit Pistons

==== Subtractions ====
Player	Reason Left	New Team
Derrick Williams	Signed 2-year contract worth $8.8 million	New York Knicks
Eric Moreland	Waived (but later re-signed by Kings)	Sacramento Kings
Andre Miller	Signed 1-year contract	Minnesota Timberwolves
