= 2015–16 New York Knicks season =

Season of National Basketball Association team the New York Knicks

- Head coach: Derek Fisher (through February 8, 2016); Kurt Rambis (after February 8, 2016)
- President: Phil Jackson
- General manager: Steve Mills
- Owners: The Madison Square Garden Company
- Arena: Madison Square Garden

Results
- Record: 32–50 (.390)
- Place: Division: 3rd (Atlantic); Conference: 13th (Eastern)
- Playoff finish: Did not qualify
- Stats at Basketball Reference

Local media
- Television: MSG TV
- Radio: WEPN-FM

The 2015–16 New York Knicks season was the 70th season of the franchise in the National Basketball Association (NBA).

The season is notable when Kristaps Porzingis gained national attention when he was booed after being drafted fourth overall in the 2015 NBA draft.

Derek Fisher in just his second season as Knicks head coach was fired on February 8, 2016, and assistant coach Kurt Rambis took over for the rest of the season.

== Draft ==
| Round | Pick | Player | Position | Nationality | College / Club |
|---|---|---|---|---|---|
| 1 | 4 | Kristaps Porziņģis | PF | Latvia | Baloncesto Sevilla (Spain) |

With their sole selection in the 2015 NBA draft, the New York Knicks selected the originally labelled 7'1" (later revealed to actually be 7'3") power forward/center from Latvia named Kristaps Porziņģis. At the time of his selection, the crowd supporting the team had greeted him with boos and jeers against him, with Stephen A. Smith originally expressing doubts and concerns with this selection. However, months after his selection, Porziņģis became an immediate star player for the Knicks, growing a huge crowd of support for himself the further the season went on, with even Stephen A. Smith changing his original stance on his later on in the season. Porziņģis would end the season with winning each Eastern Conference Rookie of the Month Award, as well as earning easy support for an NBA All-Rookie First Team spot. He was also considered the runner-up for the NBA Rookie of the Year Award, falling just short of that draft year's #1 pick, Karl-Anthony Towns.

== Roster ==
2015–16 New York Knicks roster
Players

| Pos. | No. | Player | Height | Weight | DOB | From |
|---|---|---|---|---|---|---|
| G/F | 4 | Arron Afflalo | 6 ft 5 in (1.96 m) | 210 lb (95 kg) | 1985–10–15 | UCLA |
| F/C | 17 | Lou Amundson | 6 ft 9 in (2.06 m) | 220 lb (100 kg) | 1982–12–07 | UNLV |
| F | 7 | Carmelo Anthony | 6 ft 8 in (2.03 m) | 240 lb (109 kg) | 1984–05–29 | Syracuse |
| G | 3 | José Calderón | 6 ft 3 in (1.91 m) | 200 lb (91 kg) | 1981–09–28 | Spain |
| F | 11 | Cleanthony Early | 6 ft 8 in (2.03 m) | 210 lb (95 kg) | 1991–04–17 | Wichita State |
| G | 2 | Langston Galloway | 6 ft 2 in (1.88 m) | 200 lb (91 kg) | 1991–12–09 | Saint Joseph's |
| G | 13 | Jerian Grant | 6 ft 4 in (1.93 m) | 195 lb (88 kg) | 1992–10–09 | Notre Dame |
| C | 8 | Robin Lopez | 7 ft 0 in (2.13 m) | 255 lb (116 kg) | 1988–04–01 | Stanford |
| F/C | 9 | Kyle O'Quinn | 6 ft 10 in (2.08 m) | 250 lb (113 kg) | 1990–03–26 | Norfolk State |
| F/C | 6 | Kristaps Porziņģis | 7 ft 3 in (2.21 m) | 240 lb (109 kg) | 1995–08–02 | Latvia |
| F/C | 1 | Kevin Séraphin | 6 ft 10 in (2.08 m) | 278 lb (126 kg) | 1989–12–07 | France |
| F | 42 | Lance Thomas | 6 ft 8 in (2.03 m) | 235 lb (107 kg) | 1988–04–24 | Duke |
| G | 18 | Sasha Vujačić | 6 ft 7 in (2.01 m) | 195 lb (88 kg) | 1984–03–08 | Slovenia |
| F | 23 | Derrick Williams | 6 ft 8 in (2.03 m) | 240 lb (109 kg) | 1991–05–25 | Arizona |
| G | 5 | Tony Wroten | 6 ft 6 in (1.98 m) | 205 lb (93 kg) | 1993–04–13 | Washington |

Coaches
Head coach
- Derek Fisher
- Kurt Rambis (Interim)
Assistant(s)
- Jim Cleamons
- Rasheed Hazzard
- Brian Keefe
- Josh Longstaff

Legend
- (DP) Unsigned draft pick
- (FA) Free agent
- (S) Suspended
- (DL) On assignment to D-League affiliate
- Injured

Roster
Updated: 2016–04–01

=== Preseason game log ===
2015–16 game log
Total: 4–2 (Home: 3–0; Road: 1–2)
Pre-season: 4–2 (home: 3–0; road: 1–2)

| Game | Date | Team | Score | High points | High rebounds | High assists | Location Attendance | Record |
|---|---|---|---|---|---|---|---|---|
| 1 | October 7 | Bauru | 100–81 | Carmelo Anthony (17) | Galloway, O'Quinn (8) | Grant, O'Quinn (4) | Madison Square Garden; 19,037 | 1–0 |
| 2 | October 9 | @ Washington | 115–104 | Carmelo Anthony (21) | O'Quinn, Porzingis (10) | Jose Calderón (7) | Verizon Center; 14,267 | 2–0 |
| 3 | October 12 | Philadelphia | 94–88 | Derrick Williams (21) | Lou Amundson (9) | Jerian Grant (6) | Madison Square Garden; 19,255 | 3–0 |
| 4 | October 16 | Boston | 101–95 | Derrick Williams (19) | Kyle O'Quinn (11) | Calderón, Galloway (5) | Madison Square Garden; 19,421 | 4–0 |
| 5 | October 17 | @ Charlotte | 93–97 | Cleanthony Early (17) | Derrick Williams (5) | Galloway, Thomas (6) | Time Warner Cable Arena; 11,632 | 4–1 |
| 6 | October 22 | @ Boston | 85–99 | José Calderón (17) | Kyle O'Quinn (11) | Kristaps Porziņģis (4) | TD Garden; 16,101 | 4–2 |

2015–16 season schedule

== Standing ==
| Atlantic Division | W | L | PCT | GB | Home | Road | Div | GP |
|---|---|---|---|---|---|---|---|---|
| y – Toronto Raptors | 56 | 26 | .683 | – | 32‍–‍9 | 24‍–‍17 | 14–2 | 82 |
| x – Boston Celtics | 48 | 34 | .585 | 8.0 | 28‍–‍13 | 20‍–‍21 | 10–6 | 82 |
| e – New York Knicks | 32 | 50 | .390 | 24.0 | 18‍–‍23 | 14‍–‍27 | 8–8 | 82 |
| e – Brooklyn Nets | 21 | 61 | .256 | 35.0 | 14‍–‍27 | 7‍–‍34 | 6–10 | 82 |
| e – Philadelphia 76ers | 10 | 72 | .122 | 46.0 | 7‍–‍34 | 3‍–‍38 | 2–14 | 82 |

Eastern Conference
| # | Team | W | L | PCT | GB | GP |
|---|---|---|---|---|---|---|
| 1 | c – Cleveland Cavaliers * | 57 | 25 | .695 | – | 82 |
| 2 | y – Toronto Raptors * | 56 | 26 | .683 | 1.0 | 82 |
| 3 | y – Miami Heat * | 48 | 34 | .585 | 9.0 | 82 |
| 4 | x – Atlanta Hawks | 48 | 34 | .585 | 9.0 | 82 |
| 5 | x – Boston Celtics | 48 | 34 | .585 | 9.0 | 82 |
| 6 | x – Charlotte Hornets | 48 | 34 | .585 | 9.0 | 82 |
| 7 | x – Indiana Pacers | 45 | 37 | .549 | 12.0 | 82 |
| 8 | x – Detroit Pistons | 44 | 38 | .537 | 13.0 | 82 |
| 9 | e – Chicago Bulls | 42 | 40 | .512 | 15.0 | 82 |
| 10 | e – Washington Wizards | 41 | 41 | .500 | 16.0 | 82 |
| 11 | e – Orlando Magic | 35 | 47 | .427 | 22.0 | 82 |
| 12 | e – Milwaukee Bucks | 33 | 49 | .402 | 24.0 | 82 |
| 13 | e – New York Knicks | 32 | 50 | .390 | 25.0 | 82 |
| 14 | e – Brooklyn Nets | 21 | 61 | .256 | 36.0 | 82 |
| 15 | e – Philadelphia 76ers | 10 | 72 | .122 | 47.0 | 82 |

== Regular season game log ==
2015–16 game log
Total: 32–50 (Home: 18–23; Road: 14–27)
October: 2–1 (home: 0–1; road: 2–0)

| Game | Date | Team | Score | High points | High rebounds | High assists | Location Attendance | Record |
|---|---|---|---|---|---|---|---|---|
| 1 | October 28 | @ Milwaukee | W 122–97 | Derrick Williams (24) | Kyle O'Quinn (11) | Anthony, Grant (5) | BMO Harris Bradley Center; 18,717 | 1–0 |
| 2 | October 29 | Atlanta | L 101–112 | Carmelo Anthony (25) | Kyle O'Quinn (10) | Jerian Grant (7) | Madison Square Garden; 19,812 | 1–1 |
| 3 | October 31 | @ Washington | W 117–110 | Carmelo Anthony (37) | Robin Lopez (8) | Anthony, Galloway, Vujačić (4) | Verizon Center; 20,356 | 2–1 |

November : 6–9 (home: 3–5; road: 3–4)

| Game | Date | Team | Score | High points | High rebounds | High assists | Location Attendance | Record |
|---|---|---|---|---|---|---|---|---|
| 4 | November 2 | San Antonio | L 84–94 | Carmelo Anthony (19) | Kristaps Porziņģis (14) | Robin Lopez (4) | Madison Square Garden; 19,812 | 2–2 |
| 5 | November 4 | @ Cleveland | L 86–96 | Carmelo Anthony (17) | Carmelo Anthony (12) | José Calderón (5) | Quicken Loans Arena; 20,562 | 2–3 |
| 6 | November 6 | Milwaukee | L 92–99 | Carmelo Anthony (17) | Kristaps Porziņģis (12) | Carmelo Anthony (6) | Madison Square Garden; 19,812 | 2–4 |
| 7 | November 8 | L.A. Lakers | W 99–95 | Carmelo Anthony (24) | Robin Lopez (13) | Jerian Grant (8) | Madison Square Garden; 19,812 | 3–4 |
| 8 | November 10 | @ Toronto | W 111–109 | Carmelo Anthony (23) | Robin Lopez (8) | Galloway, Grant (4) | Air Canada Centre; 19,800 | 4–4 |
| 9 | November 11 | @ Charlotte | L 93–95 | Carmelo Anthony (29) | Kristaps Porziņģis (15) | Calderón, Grant (5) | Time Warner Cable Arena; 16,643 | 4–5 |
| 10 | November 13 | Cleveland | L 84–90 | Carmelo Anthony (26) | Williams, Porziņģis (7) | Anthony, Afflalo (4) | Madison Square Garden; 19,812 | 4–6 |
| 11 | November 15 | New Orleans | W 95–87 | Carmelo Anthony (29) | Carmelo Anthony (13) | Anthony, Calderón, Grant, Lopez (3) | Madison Square Garden; 19,812 | 5–6 |
| 12 | November 17 | Charlotte | W 102–94 | Kristaps Porziņģis (29) | Anthony, Porziņģis (11) | Anthony, Grant (5) | Madison Square Garden; 19,812 | 6–6 |
| 13 | November 20 | @ Oklahoma City | W 93–90 | Carmelo Anthony (25) | Robin Lopez (7) | José Calderón (7) | Chesapeake Energy Arena; 18,203 | 7–6 |
| 14 | November 21 | @ Houston | W 107–102 | Kristaps Porzingis (24) | Kristaps Porzingis (14) | José Calderón (7) | Toyota Center; 18,226 | 8–6 |
| 15 | November 23 | @ Miami | L 78–95 | Carmelo Anthony (21) | Kristaps Porzingis (14) | Carmelo Anthony (4) | American Airlines Arena; 19,777 | 8–7 |
| 16 | November 25 | @ Orlando | L 91–100 | Carmelo Anthony (25) | Carmelo Anthony (13) | José Calderón (4) | Amway Center; 18,846 | 8–8 |
| 17 | November 27 | Miami | L 78–97 | Anthony, Porzingis (11) | Quinn, Porzingis (8) | Jerian Grant (6) | Madison Square Garden; 19,812 | 8–9 |
| 18 | November 29 | Houston | L 111–116 (OT) | Arron Afflalo (31) | Kristaps Porzingis (13) | Afflalo, Calderón, Galloway, Seraphin (4) | Madison Square Garden; 19,812 | 8–10 |

December : 7–8 (home: 5–2; road: 2–6)

| Game | Date | Team | Score | High points | High rebounds | High assists | Location Attendance | Record |
|---|---|---|---|---|---|---|---|---|
| 19 | December 2 | Philadelphia | W 99–87 | Kristaps Porzingis (17) | Kristaps Porzingis (10) | José Calderón (5) | Madison Square Garden; 19,812 | 9–10 |
| 20 | December 4 | Brooklyn | W 108–91 | Carmelo Anthony (28) | Kristaps Porzingis (10) | José Calderón (10) | Madison Square Garden; 19,812 | 10–10 |
| 21 | December 5 | @ Milwaukee | L 91–106 | Carmelo Anthony (18) | Kristaps Porzingis (7) | Calderón, Seraphin (5) | BMO Harris Bradley Center; 16,223 | 10–11 |
| 22 | December 7 | Dallas | L 97–104 | Kristaps Porzingis (28) | José Calderón (7) | Carmelo Anthony (8) | Madison Square Garden; 19,812 | 10–12 |
| 23 | December 9 | @ Utah | L 85–106 | Carmelo Anthony (13) | Kyle O'Quinn (6) | Sasha Vujacic (7) | Vivint Smart Home Arena; 18,586 | 10–13 |
| 24 | December 10 | @ Sacramento | L 97–99 | Carmelo Anthony (23) | Carmelo Anthony (14) | Carmelo Anthony (4) | Sleep Train Arena; 17,317 | 10–14 |
| 25 | December 12 | @ Portland | W 112–110 | Carmelo Anthony (37) | Lopez, Quinn (7) | Derrick Williams (4) | Moda Center; 19,511 | 11–14 |
| 26 | December 16 | Minnesota | W 107–102 | Arron Afflalo (29) | Carmelo Anthony (15) | Carmelo Anthony (9) | Madison Square Garden; 19,812 | 12–14 |
| 27 | December 18 | @ Philadelphia | W 107–97 | Arron Afflalo (22) | Afflalo, Quinn (7) | José Calderón (6) | Wells Fargo Center; 17,880 | 13–14 |
| 28 | December 19 | Chicago | W 107–91 | Carmelo Anthony (27) | Kyle O'Quinn (10) | José Calderón (5) | Madison Square Garden; 19,812 | 14–14 |
| 29 | December 21 | Orlando | L 99–107 | Carmelo Anthony (23) | Lopez, Porzingis (8) | Carmelo Anthony (6) | Madison Square Garden; 19,812 | 14–15 |
| 30 | December 23 | @ Cleveland | L 84–91 | Kristaps Porzingis (23) | Kristaps Porzingis (13) | José Calderón (6) | Quicken Loans Arena; 20,562 | 14–16 |
| 31 | December 26 | @ Atlanta | L 98–117 | Carmelo Anthony (18) | Carmelo Anthony (12) | José Calderón (8) | Philips Arena; 19,015 | 14–17 |
| 32 | December 27 | @ Boston | L 91–100 | Carmelo Anthony (29) | Kristaps Porzingis (12) | Langston Galloway (5) | TD Garden; 18,624 | 14–18 |
| 33 | December 29 | Detroit | W 108–96 | Carmelo Anthony (24) | Robin Lopez (7) | José Calderón (8) | Madison Square Garden; 19,812 | 15–18 |

January : 8–9 (home: 6–3; road: 2–6)

| Game | Date | Team | Score | High points | High rebounds | High assists | Location Attendance | Record |
|---|---|---|---|---|---|---|---|---|
| 34 | January 1 | @ Chicago | L 81–108 | Carmelo Anthony (20) | Kristaps Porzingis (9) | José Calderón (4) | United Center; 22,443 | 15–19 |
| 35 | January 3 | Atlanta | W 111–97 | Arron Afflalo (38) | Robin Lopez (11) | Jerian Grant (7) | Madison Square Garden; 19,812 | 16–19 |
| 36 | January 5 | @ Atlanta | W 107–101 | Afflalo, Anthony (23) | Anthony, Porzingis (11) | José Calderón (6) | Philips Arena; 15,082 | 17–19 |
| 37 | January 6 | @ Miami | W 98–90 | Anthony (25) | Derrick Williams (8) | Carmelo Anthony (4) | American Airlines Arena; 19,987 | 18–19 |
| 38 | January 8 | @ San Antonio | L 99–100 | Kristaps Porzingis (28) | Carmelo Anthony (12) | José Calderón (5) | AT&T Center; 18,420 | 18–20 |
| 39 | January 10 | Milwaukee | W 100–88 | Carmelo Anthony (24) | Carmelo Anthony (10) | Carmelo Anthony (8) | Madison Square Garden; 19,812 | 19–20 |
| 40 | January 12 | Boston | W 120–114 | Kristaps Porzingis (26) | Derrick Williams (10) | Jerian Grant (8) | Madison Square Garden; 19,812 | 20–20 |
| 41 | January 13 | @ Brooklyn | L 104–110 | Arron Afflalo (18) | Robin Lopez (12) | Langston Galloway (5) | Barclays Center; 17,732 | 20–21 |
| 42 | January 16 | @ Memphis | L 95–103 | Kristaps Porzingis (17) | Langston Galloway (11) | Calderón, Galloway (5) | FedEx Forum; 18,119 | 20–22 |
| 43 | January 18 | Philadelphia | W 119–113 (OT) | Arron Afflalo (25) | Kristaps Porzingis (12) | Carmelo Anthony (7) | Madison Square Garden; 19,812 | 21–22 |
| 44 | January 20 | Utah | W 118–111 (OT) | Carmelo Anthony (30) | Robin Lopez (12) | Carmelo Anthony (9) | Madison Square Garden; 19,812 | 22–22 |
| 45 | January 22 | L. A. Clippers | L 88–116 | Carmelo Anthony (16) | Kristaps Porzingis (8) | Jerian Grant (8) | Madison Square Garden; 19,812 | 22–23 |
| 46 | January 23 | @ Charlotte | L 84–97 | Derrick Williams (19) | Derrick Williams (14) | José Calderón (7) | Time Warner Cable Arena; 17,768 | 22–24 |
| 47 | January 26 | Oklahoma City | L 122–128 (OT) | Langston Galloway (21) | Derrick Williams (10) | José Calderón (6) | Madison Square Garden; 19,812 | 22–25 |
| 48 | January 28 | @ Toronto | L 93–103 | Arron Afflalo (20) | Robin Lopez (8) | Jerian Grant (6) | Air Canada Centre; 19,800 | 22–26 |
| 49 | January 29 | Phoenix | W 102–84 | Carmelo Anthony (19) | Carmelo Anthony (10) | Carmelo Anthony (8) | Madison Square Garden; 19,812 | 23–26 |
| 50 | January 31 | Golden State | L 95–116 | Carmelo Anthony (24) | Carmelo Anthony (10) | Langston Galloway (5) | Madison Square Garden; 19,812 | 23–27 |

February : 2–9 (home: 1–6; road: 1–3)

| Game | Date | Team | Score | High points | High rebounds | High assists | Location Attendance | Record |
|---|---|---|---|---|---|---|---|---|
| 51 | February 2 | Boston | L 89–97 | Arron Afflalo (18) | Carmelo Anthony (14) | Carmelo Anthony (4) | Madison Square Garden; 19,812 | 23–28 |
| 52 | February 4 | @ Detroit | L 105–111 | Robin Lopez (26) | Robin Lopez (16) | Carmelo Anthony (8) | Palace of Auburn Hills; 17,095 | 23–29 |
| 53 | February 5 | Memphis | L 85–91 | José Calderón (18) | Lopez, Porzingis (10) | José Calderón (5) | Madison Square Garden; 19,812 | 23–30 |
| 54 | February 7 | Denver | L 96–101 | Anthony, Porzingis (21) | Kristaps Porzingis (13) | Carmelo Anthony (7) | Madison Square Garden; 19,812 | 23–31 |
| 55 | February 9 | Washington | L 108–111 | Carmelo Anthony (33) | Carmelo Anthony (13) | José Calderón (6) | Madison Square Garden; 19,812 | 23–32 |
All-Star Break
| 56 | February 19 | @ Brooklyn | L 98–109 | Carmelo Anthony (22) | Kristaps Porzingis (8) | Carmelo Anthony (6) | Barclays Center; 17,732 | 23–33 |
| 57 | February 20 | @ Minnesota | W 103–95 | Carmelo Anthony (30) | Robin Lopez (16) | Carmelo Anthony (4) | Target Center; 16,663 | 24–33 |
| 58 | February 22 | Toronto | L 95–122 | Carmelo Anthony (23) | Robin Lopez (13) | Carmelo Anthony (5) | Madison Square Garden; 19,812 | 24–34 |
| 59 | February 24 | @ Indiana | L 105–108 | Kristaps Porzingis (22) | Anthony, Lopez (7) | Calderón, Galloway, Thomas (4) | Bankers Life Fieldhouse; 16,018 | 24–35 |
| 60 | February 26 | Orlando | W 108–95 | Carmelo Anthony (19) | Arron Afflalo (12) | Carmelo Anthony (6) | Madison Square Garden; 19,812 | 25–35 |
| 61 | February 28 | Miami | L 81–98 | Carmelo Anthony (25) | Robin Lopez (14) | Anthony, Galloway (4) | Madison Square Garden; 19,812 | 25–36 |

March : 5–10 (home: 2–2; road: 3–8)

| Game | Date | Team | Score | High points | High rebounds | High assists | Location Attendance | Record |
|---|---|---|---|---|---|---|---|---|
| 62 | March 1 | Portland | L 85–104 | Carmelo Anthony (23) | Carmelo Anthony (10) | Carmelo Anthony (4) | Madison Square Garden; 19,812 | 25–37 |
| 63 | March 4 | @ Boston | L 104–105 | Carmelo Anthony (30) | Robin Lopez (12) | José Calderón (5) | TD Garden; 18,624 | 25–38 |
| 64 | March 5 | Detroit | W 102–89 | Carmelo Anthony (24) | Carmelo Anthony (10) | Carmelo Anthony (6) | Madison Square Garden; 19,812 | 26–38 |
| 65 | March 8 | @ Denver | L 94–110 | Carmelo Anthony (30) | Grant, Porzingis (7) | Anthony, Calderón (4) | Pepsi Center; 13,305 | 26–39 |
| 66 | March 9 | @ Phoenix | W 128–97 | Anthony, Vujacic (23) | Robin Lopez (8) | José Calderón (12) | Talking Stick Resort Arena; 17,105 | 27–39 |
| 67 | March 11 | @ L. A. Clippers | L 94–101 | Kristaps Porzingis (23) | Robin Lopez (19) | José Calderón (7) | STAPLES Center; 19,175 | 27–40 |
| 68 | March 13 | @ L. A. Lakers | W 90–87 | Carmelo Anthony (26) | Carmelo Anthony (12) | José Calderón (6) | STAPLES Center; 18,997 | 28–40 |
| 69 | March 16 | @ Golden State | L 85–121 | Carmelo Anthony (18) | Kristaps Porziņģis (7) | Carmelo Anthony (6) | Oracle Arena; 19,596 | 28–41 |
| 70 | March 19 | @ Washington | L 89–99 | Anthony, Porziņģis (30) | Kevin Seraphin (9) | Carmelo Anthony (5) | Verizon Center; 20,356 | 28–42 |
| 71 | March 20 | Sacramento | L 80–88 | Robin Lopez (23) | Robin Lopez (20) | José Calderón (4) | Madison Square Garden; 19,812 | 28–43 |
| 72 | March 23 | @ Chicago | W 115–107 | Kristaps Porziņģis (29) | Robin Lopez (13) | José Calderón (8) | United Center; 21,788 | 29–43 |
| 73 | March 24 | Chicago | W 106–94 | Carmelo Anthony (26) | Kristaps Porziņģis (10) | José Calderón (7) | Madison Square Garden; 19,812 | 30–43 |
| 74 | March 26 | Cleveland | L 93–107 | Carmelo Anthony (28) | Carmelo Anthony (9) | José Calderón (7) | Madison Square Garden; 19,812 | 30–44 |
| 75 | March 28 | @ New Orleans | L 91–99 | Carmelo Anthony (22) | Kristaps Porziņģis (10) | Carmelo Anthony (6) | Smoothie King Center; 17,000 | 30–45 |
| 76 | March 30 | @ Dallas | L 89–91 | Carmelo Anthony (31) | Robin Lopez (9) | Langston Galloway (3) | American Airlines Center; 20,435 | 30–46 |

April : 2–4 (home: 1–3; road: 1–1)

| Game | Date | Team | Score | High points | High rebounds | High assists | Location Attendance | Record |
|---|---|---|---|---|---|---|---|---|
| 77 | April 1 | Brooklyn | W 105–91 | Langston Galloway (18) | Kevin Seraphin (7) | Langston Galloway (7) | Madison Square Garden; 19,812 | 31–46 |
| 78 | April 3 | Indiana | L 87–92 | Sasha Vujacic (21) | Robin Lopez (15) | Langston Galloway (6) | Madison Square Garden; 19,812 | 31–47 |
| 79 | April 6 | Charlotte | L 97–111 | Derrick Williams (17) | Derrick Williams (10) | Carmelo Anthony (7) | Madison Square Garden; 19,812 | 31–48 |
| 80 | April 8 | @ Philadelphia | W 109–102 | Robin Lopez (24) | Robin Lopez (15) | Jerian Grant (6) | Wells Fargo Center; 16,076 | 32–48 |
| 81 | April 10 | Toronto | L 89–93 | Carmelo Anthony (21) | Kyle O'Quinn (10) | Langston Galloway (4) | Madison Square Garden; 19,812 | 32–49 |
| 82 | April 12 | @ Indiana | L 90–102 | Derrick Williams (21) | Kyle O'Quinn (7) | Sasha Vujacic (6) | Bankers Life Fieldhouse; 17,906 | 32–50 |

2015–16 season schedule

== Player statistics ==
Legend
| GP | Games played | GS | Games started | MPG | Minutes per game |
| FG% | Field-goal percentage | 3P% | 3-point field-goal percentage | FT% | Free-throw percentage |
| RPG | Rebounds per game | APG | Assists per game | SPG | Steals per game |
| BPG | Blocks per game | PPG | Points per game |

=== Regular season ===
| Player | GP | GS | MPG | FG% | 3P% | FT% | RPG | APG | SPG | BPG | PPG |
|---|---|---|---|---|---|---|---|---|---|---|---|
| Robin Lopez | 82 | 82 | 27.1 | .539 | .000 | .795 | 7.3 | 1.4 | .2 | 1.6 | 10.3 |
| Langston Galloway | 82 | 7 | 24.8 | .393 | .344 | .754 | 3.5 | 2.5 | .9 | .3 | 7.6 |
| Derrick Williams | 80 | 9 | 17.9 | .450 | .293 | .758 | 3.7 | .9 | .4 | .1 | 9.3 |
| Jerian Grant | 76 | 6 | 16.6 | .394 | .220 | .780 | 1.9 | 2.3 | .7 | .1 | 5.6 |
| Carmelo Anthony | 72 | 72 | 35.1 | .434 | .339 | .829 | 7.7 | 4.2 | .9 | .5 | 21.8 |
| Kristaps Porziņģis | 72 | 72 | 28.4 | .421 | .333 | .838 | 7.3 | 1.3 | .7 | 1.9 | 14.3 |
| José Calderón | 72 | 72 | 28.1 | .459 | .414 | .875 | 3.2 | 4.1 | .9 | .1 | 7.6 |
| Arron Afflalo | 71 | 57 | 33.4 | .443 | .382 | .840 | 3.7 | 2.0 | .4 | .1 | 12.8 |
| Kyle O'Quinn | 65 | 1 | 11.8 | .476 | .227 | .767 | 3.8 | 1.1 | .3 | .8 | 4.8 |
| Sasha Vujačić | 61 | 25 | 14.9 | .383 | .364 | .821 | 2.4 | 1.4 | .6 | .1 | 4.9 |
| Lance Thomas | 59 | 5 | 22.3 | .442 | .404 | .857 | 2.2 | .9 | .4 | .1 | 8.2 |
| Kevin Séraphin | 48 | 0 | 11.0 | .410 | .000 | .826 | 2.6 | 1.0 | .2 | .8 | 3.9 |
| Lou Amundson | 29 | 0 | 7.0 | .358 | | .519 | 1.7 | .4 | .2 | .2 | 1.8 |
| Cleanthony Early | 17 | 2 | 9.1 | .300 | .267 | .750 | 1.5 | .4 | .1 | .2 | 1.8 |
| Thanasis Antetokounmpo | 2 | 0 | 3.0 | .750 | .000 | | .5 | .0 | .0 | .0 | 3.0 |
| Jimmer Fredette^{†} | 2 | 0 | 2.5 | 1.000 | 1.000 | .800 | .0 | .0 | .0 | .0 | 3.5 |

- ^{†} Denotes player spent time with another team in the season. Stats reflect time with the Knicks only.

== Transactions ==
=== Trades ===
| June 25, 2015 | To Atlanta Hawks Tim Hardaway Jr. (from New York); Two future second-round picks (from Washington) | To New York Knicks Draft rights to Jerian Grant (from Washington) |
| June 25, 2015 | To Washington Wizards Draft rights to Kelly Oubre, Jr. (from Atlanta) |

=== Re-signed ===
| Player | Signed | Former Team |
|---|---|---|
| Lou Amundson | Signed 1-year contract worth $1.6 million | New York Knicks |

==== Additions ====
| Player | Signed | Former Team |
|---|---|---|
| Arron Afflalo | Signed 2-year contract worth $16 million | Portland Trail Blazers |
| Robin Lopez | Signed 4-year contract worth $54 million | Portland Trail Blazers |
| Kyle O'Quinn | Signed 4-year contract worth $16 million | Orlando Magic |
| Derrick Williams | Signed 2-year contract worth $8.8 million | Sacramento Kings |
| Sasha Vujacic | Signed 1-year contract worth $1.3 million | İstanbul BB |
| Thanasis Antetokounmpo | Signed 2-year contract worth $1.4 million | Westchester Knicks |
| Kevin Seraphin | Signed 1-year contract worth $2.8 million | Washington Wizards |

==== Subtractions ====
| Player | Reason Left | New Team |
|---|---|---|
| Shane Larkin | Signed 2-year contract worth $3 million | Brooklyn Nets |
| Cole Aldrich | Signed 2-year contract worth $2.3 million | Los Angeles Clippers |
| Jason Smith | Signed 1-year contract worth $4.5 million | Orlando Magic |
| Alexey Shved | Signed 3-year contract | Khimki |
| Andrea Bargnani | Signed 2-year contract worth $2.9 million | Brooklyn Nets |
| Quincy Acy | Signed 2-year contract worth $2 million | Sacramento Kings |
| Ricky Ledo | Waived | Reno Bighorns |
