= 2015–16 Philadelphia 76ers season =

NBA professional basketball team season

- Head coach: Brett Brown
- General manager: Sam Hinkie (resigned); Bryan Colangelo
- Owners: Josh Harris
- Arena: Wells Fargo Center

Results
- Record: 10–72 (.122)
- Place: Division: 5th (Atlantic); Conference: 15th (Eastern)
- Playoff finish: Did not qualify
- Stats at Basketball Reference

Local media
- Television: CSN (71 games); TCN (11 games)
- Radio: WPEN

The 2015–16 Philadelphia 76ers season was the team's 77th season in the National Basketball Association (NBA). It was the second-worst season in franchise history, one game better than their 9–73 mark in the 1972–73 season, and was also the second straight season that Joel Embiid, the third pick in the 2014 NBA draft, would not suit up for the 76ers due to a leg injury. On November 27, 2015, with a 116–114 loss to the Houston Rockets, Philadelphia broke the record for the longest losing streak in American professional sports history with 27 straight losses spanning the 2014–15 and 2015–16 seasons (the previous record of 26 was held by the 2010-11 Cleveland Cavaliers). The losing streak would reach 28 games (including 18 straight losses to start the season, tying the record for longest opening season losing streak with the 2009–10 New Jersey Nets) before the 76ers recorded their first victory, at home against the Los Angeles Lakers, which was also Kobe Bryant's last game against the 76ers in Philadelphia. Philadelphia would also hire former Phoenix Suns owner, coach, general manager, and four-time NBA Executive of the Year winner Jerry Colangelo on December 7, 2015, as their Chairman of Basketball Operations. Eleven days later, former Denver Nuggets, Phoenix Suns, New York Knicks, and Los Angeles Lakers head coach Mike D'Antoni would join the team as an associate head coach. Near the end of the season, general manager Sam Hinkie would announce his resignation from his position, being replaced by Jerry's son Bryan Colangelo before the end of the season. Jerry would also announce his personal demotion from his original position afterwards.

The 76ers finished just one game shy of tying the NBA record for most losses in a season, set by the Sixers themselves during their 1972–73 season when they went 9–73. They became only the second team after the Vancouver Grizzlies between 1995–96 and 1997–98 to endure three consecutive 82-game seasons with fewer than twenty wins. However, it would be the season where Sam Hinkie's goal of "The Process" came into full fruition since the 76ers earned the #1 selection in the 2016 NBA draft, with which they selected Ben Simmons.

== Draft picks ==
Round	Pick	Player	Position	Nationality	College / Team
1	3	Jahlil Okafor	C	United States	Duke
2	35	Willy Hernangómez	C	Spain	Baloncesto Sevilla (Spain)
2	37	Richaun Holmes	PF / C	United States	Bowling Green
2	47	Artūras Gudaitis	C	Lithuania	Žalgiris Kaunas (Lithuania)
2	58	J. P. Tokoto	SG	United States	North Carolina
2	60	Luka Mitrović	PF	Serbia	Crvena Zvezda (Serbia)

== Preseason game log ==
=== Preseason ===
2015 pre-season game log
Total: 2–5 (Home: 2–1; Road: 0–4)
Pre-season: 2–5 (home: 2–1; road: 0–4)

Game	Date	Team	Score	High points	High rebounds	High assists	Location Attendance	Record
1	October 6	@ Washington	95–129	Canaan, Noel (13)	Jerami Grant (8)	Isaiah Canaan (6)	Verizon Center; 11,670	0–1
2	October 8	Cleveland	115–114	Jerami Grant (19)	Nerlens Noel (15)	Robert Covington (6)	Wells Fargo Center; 8,229	1–1
3	October 10	Brooklyn	97–95	Robert Covington (23)	Robert Covington (8)	Isaiah Canaan (8)	Times Union Center; 6,737	2–1
4	October 12	@ New York	88–94	Isaiah Canaan (18)	Christian Wood (10)	Aldemir, Grant, McRae, Wilbekin (2)	Madison Square Garden; 19,255	2–2
5	October 16	Washington	118–127	Scottie Wilbekin (21)	Furkan Aldemir (14)	T. J. McConnell (10)	Wells Fargo Center; 10,798	2–3
6	October 18	@ Brooklyn	91–92	Nerlens Noel (15)	Nerlens Noel (11)	Nerlens Noel (5)	Barclays Center; 10,756	2–4
7	October 23	@ Boston	65–81	Jahlil Okafor (12)	Nerlens Noel (9)	Canaan, Jackson (3)	Verizon Wireless Arena; 8,403	2–5

2015–16 season schedule

== Regular season game log ==
2015–16 game log
Total: 10–72 (Home: 7–34; Road: 3–38)
October: 0–2 (home: 0–1; road: 0–1)

Game	Date	Team	Score	High points	High rebounds	High assists	Location Attendance	Record
1	October 28	@ Boston	L 95–112	Jahlil Okafor (26)	Nerlens Noel (12)	T. J. McConnell (4)	TD Garden; 18,624	0–1
2	October 30	Utah	L 71–99	Grant, Stauskas (12)	Nerlens Noel (10)	T. J. McConnell (4)	Wells Fargo Center; 17,122	0–2

November : 0–16 (home: 0–6; road: 0–10)

Game	Date	Team	Score	High points	High rebounds	High assists	Location Attendance	Record
3	November 2	Cleveland	L 100–107	Jahlil Okafor (24)	Nerlens Noel (8)	T. J. McConnell (12)	Wells Fargo Center; 18,094	0–3
4	November 4	@ Milwaukee	L 87–91	Jahlil Okafor (21)	Nerlens Noel (12)	T. J. McConnell (12)	BMO Harris Bradley Center; 12,437	0–4
5	November 6	@ Cleveland	L 102–108	Noel, Okafor (18)	Nerlens Noel (12)	Canaan, McConnell (4)	Quicken Loans Arena; 20,562	0–5
6	November 7	Orlando	L 97–105	Isaiah Canaan (23)	T. J. McConnell (8)	T. J. McConnell (9)	Wells Fargo Center; 15,207	0–6
7	November 9	Chicago	L 88–111	Jahlil Okafor (21)	Jahlil Okafor (15)	T. J. McConnell (8)	Wells Fargo Center; 13,879	0–7
8	November 11	Toronto	L 103–119	Jahlil Okafor (26)	Jerami Grant (10)	T. J. McConnell (13)	Wells Fargo Center; 12,744	0–8
9	November 13	@ Oklahoma City	L 85–102	Christian Wood (15)	Nerlens Noel (11)	McConnell, Stauskas (3)	Chesapeake Energy Arena; 18,203	0–9
10	November 14	@ San Antonio	L 83–92	Jahlil Okafor (21)	Jahlil Okafor (12)	Phil Pressey (6)	AT&T Center; 18,717	0–10
11	November 16	Dallas	L 86–92	Jahlil Okafor (19)	Nerlens Noel (12)	T. J. McConnell (6)	Wells Fargo Center; 11,555	0–11
12	November 18	Indiana	L 85–112	T. J. McConnell (16)	Hollis Thompson (9)	Phil Pressey (5)	Wells Fargo Center; 11,080	0–12
13	November 20	@ Charlotte	L 88–113	Nerlens Noel (16)	Nerlens Noel (16)	T. J. McConnell (6)	Time Warner Cable Arena; 17,926	0–13
14	November 21	@ Miami	L 91–96	Isaiah Canaan (22)	Jahlil Okafor (11)	T. J. McConnell (5)	American Airlines Arena; 19,673	0–14
15	November 23	@ Minnesota	L 95–100	Jahlil Okafor (25)	Jahlil Okafor (12)	T. J. McConnell (8)	Target Center; 11,382	0–15
16	November 25	@ Boston	L 80–84	Jahlil Okafor (19)	Robert Covington (14)	Phil Pressey (4)	TD Garden; 17,588	0–16
17	November 27	@ Houston	L 114–116	Robert Covington (28)	Robert Covington (7)	T. J. McConnell (6)	Toyota Center; 17,306	0–17
18	November 29	@ Memphis	L 84–92	Isaiah Canaan (16)	Jahlil Okafor (13)	T. J. McConnell (6)	FedEx Forum; 15,322	0–18

December : 3–13 (home: 1–5; road: 2–8)

Game	Date	Team	Score	High points	High rebounds	High assists	Location Attendance	Record
19	December 1 *	L.A. Lakers	W 103–91	Robert Covington (23)	Nerlens Noel (9)	T. J. McConnell (6)	Wells Fargo Center; 20,510	1–18
20	December 2	@ New York	L 87–99	Hollis Thompson (13)	Nerlens Noel (6)	Canaan, Covington (3)	Madison Square Garden; 19,812	1–19
21	December 5	Denver	L 105–108	Robert Covington (18)	Robert Covington (10)	T. J. McConnell (6)	Wells Fargo Center; 14,367	1–20
22	December 7	San Antonio	L 68–119	Covington, Noel, Stauskas (13)	Covington, Noel (6)	Isaiah Canaan (5)	Wells Fargo Center; 14,449	1–21
23	December 10	@ Brooklyn	L 91–100	Jahlil Okafor (22)	Jahlil Okafor (10)	Nik Stauskas (5)	Barclays Center; 13,266	1–22
24	December 11	Detroit	L 95–107	Jahlil Okafor (22)	Nerlens Noel (10)	Kendall Marshall (6)	Wells Fargo Center; 14,020	1–23
25	December 13	@ Toronto	L 76–96	Jahlil Okafor (23)	Jahlil Okafor (14)	Kendall Marshall (5)	Air Canada Centre; 19,800	1–24
26	December 14	@ Chicago	L 96–115	Jahlil Okafor (22)	Jahlil Okafor (8)	Hollis Thompson (4)	United Center; 21,166	1–25
27	December 16	@ Atlanta	L 106–127	Isaiah Canaan (24)	Holmes, Okafor (7)	Covington, Marshall, McConnell (4)	Philips Arena; 14,827	1–26
28	December 18	New York	L 97–107	Jahlil Okafor (20)	Hollis Thompson (7)	Canaan, McConnell, Marshall, Wroten (3)	Wells Fargo Center; 17,880	1–27
29	December 20	@ Cleveland	L 86–108	Nerlens Noel (15)	Nerlens Noel (12)	Kendall Marshall (5)	Quicken Loans Arena; 20,562	1–28
30	December 22	Memphis	L 90–104	Jahlil Okafor (18)	Covington, Noel (8)	Tony Wroten (7)	Wells Fargo Center; 15,552	1–29
31	December 23	@ Milwaukee	L 100–113	Jahlil Okafor (17)	Jahlil Okafor (8)	Kendall Marshall (7)	BMO Harris Bradley Center; 15,754	1–30
32	December 26	@ Phoenix	W 111–104	Isaiah Canaan (22)	Nerlens Noel (11)	Ish Smith (5)	Talking Stick Resort Arena; 17,548	2–30
33	December 28	@ Utah	L 91–95	Ish Smith (22)	Nerlens Noel (6)	Ish Smith (11)	Vivint Smart Home Arena; 19,911	2–31
34	December 30	@ Sacramento	W 110–105	Nerlens Noel (20)	Jerami Grant (11)	Ish Smith (9)	Sleep Train Arena; 17,317	3–31

January : 4–10 (home: 3–6; road: 1–4)

Game	Date	Team	Score	High points	High rebounds	High assists	Location Attendance	Record
35	January 1	@ L.A. Lakers	L 84–93	Nerlens Noel (15)	Nerlens Noel (12)	T. J. McConnell (7)	Staples Center; 18,997	3–32
36	January 2	@ L.A. Clippers	L 99–130	Jahlil Okafor (23)	Nerlens Noel (8)	Ish Smith (10)	Staples Center; 19,212	3–33
37	January 4	Minnesota	W 109–99	Ish Smith (21)	Nerlens Noel (9)	Ish Smith (11)	Wells Fargo Center; 14,013	4–33
38	January 7	Atlanta	L 98–126	Jahlil Okafor (21)	Nerlens Noel (13)	Ish Smith (7)	Wells Fargo Center; 12,611	4–34
39	January 9	Toronto	L 95–108	Ish Smith (28)	Nerlens Noel (8)	T. J. McConnell (8)	Wells Fargo Center; 14,100	4–35
40	January 10	Cleveland	L 85–95	Jahlil Okafor (21)	Nerlens Noel (9)	Ish Smith (10)	Wells Fargo Center; 19,226	4–36
41	January 14	Chicago	L 111–115 (OT)	Robert Covington (25)	Covington, Noel (6)	Ish Smith (8)	Wells Fargo Center; 14,063	4–37
42	January 16	Portland	W 114–89	Jahlil Okafor (25)	Jahlil Okafor (10)	T. J. McConnell (7)	Wells Fargo Center; 15,698	5–37
43	January 18	@ New York	L 113–119 (OT)	Jahlil Okafor (20)	Nerlens Noel (16)	Ish Smith (16)	Madison Square Garden; 19,812	5–38
44	January 20	@ Orlando	W 96–87	Jahlil Okafor (20)	Robert Covington (11)	Ish Smith (11)	Amway Center; 17,746	6–38
45	January 24	Boston	L 92–112	Robert Covington (25)	Nerlens Noel (9)	Ish Smith (4)	Wells Fargo Center; 9,722	6–39
46	January 26	Phoenix	W 113–103	Ish Smith (20)	Nerlens Noel (9)	Ish Smith (9)	Wells Fargo Center; 10,851	7–39
47	January 27	@ Detroit	L 97–110	Jerami Grant (21)	Covington, Grant (8)	McConnell, Smith (6)	The Palace of Auburn Hills; 13,712	7–40
48	January 30 *	Golden State	L 105–108	Isaiah Canaan (18)	Robert Covington (13)	Ish Smith (9)	Wells Fargo Center; 20,798	7–41

February : 1–11 (home: 1–5; road: 0–6)

Game	Date	Team	Score	High points	High rebounds	High assists	Location Attendance	Record
49	February 3	Atlanta	L 86–124	Nik Stauskas (17)	Nerlens Noel (7)	Ish Smith (7)	Wells Fargo Center; 10,429	7–42
50	February 5	@ Washington	L 94–106	Ish Smith (22)	Nerlens Noel (8)	Ish Smith (5)	Verizon Center; 17,305	7–43
51	February 6	Brooklyn	W 103–98	Jahlil Okafor (22)	Jahlil Okafor (17)	T. J. McConnell (6)	Wells Fargo Center; 18,847	8–43
52	February 8	L.A. Clippers	L 92–98 (OT)	Smith, Thompson (16)	Jerami Grant (11)	Ish Smith (5)	Wells Fargo Center; 13,310	8–44
53	February 10	Sacramento	L 110–114	Robert Covington (29)	Jahlil Okafor (10)	Ish Smith (10)	Wells Fargo Center; 12,501	8–45
2016 All-Star Break
54	February 19	@ New Orleans	L 114–121	Nerlens Noel (24)	Nerlens Noel (9)	Ish Smith (7)	Smoothie King Center; 16,953	8–46
55	February 21	@ Dallas	L 103–129	Jahlil Okafor (31)	Jahlil Okafor (8)	T. J. McConnell (6)	American Airlines Center; 20,194	8–47
56	February 23	Orlando	L 115–124	Ish Smith (22)	Nerlens Noel (11)	Ish Smith (5)	Wells Fargo Center; 13,745	8–48
57	February 24	@ Detroit	L 91–111	Hollis Thompson (19)	Richaun Holmes (7)	Marshall, Stauskas (4)	The Palace of Auburn Hills; 13,429	8–49
58	February 26	Washington	L 94–103	Jahlil Okafor (21)	Robert Covington (12)	Ish Smith (8)	Wells Fargo Center; 16,511	8–50
59	February 28	@ Orlando	L 116–130	Jahlil Okafor (26)	Jerami Grant (8)	Ish Smith (7)	Amway Center; 16,168	8–51
60	February 29	@ Washington	L 108–116	Ish Smith (25)	Grant, Noel (6)	Ish Smith (7)	Verizon Center; 15,096	8–52

March : 1–14 (home: 1–8; road: 0–6)

Game	Date	Team	Score	High points	High rebounds	High assists	Location Attendance	Record
61	March 2	Charlotte	L 99–119	Canaan, Covington, Noel (17)	Robert Covington (9)	Ish Smith (8)	Wells Fargo Center; 11,143	8–53
62	March 4	Miami	L 102–112	Ish Smith (26)	Ish Smith (8)	Ish Smith (8)	Wells Fargo Center; 17,610	8–54
63	March 6	@ Miami	L 98–103	Ish Smith (21)	Robert Covington (9)	Ish Smith (5)	American Airlines Arena; 19,820	8–55
64	March 9	Houston	L 104–118	Ish Smith (21)	Nerlens Noel (9)	Ish Smith (5)	Wells Fargo Center; 15,237	8–56
65	March 11	Brooklyn	W 95–89	Carl Landry (16)	Nerlens Noel (11)	Ish Smith (9)	Wells Fargo Center; 14,128	9–56
66	March 12	Detroit	L 111–125	Isaiah Canaan (22)	Hollis Thompson (7)	Nik Stauskas (5)	Wells Fargo Center; 16,087	9–57
67	March 15	@ Brooklyn	L 114–131	Isaiah Canaan (20)	Carl Landry (8)	Nik Stauskas (6)	Barclays Center; 14,560	9–58
68	March 17	Washington	L 94–99	Ish Smith (20)	Nerlens Noel (16)	Ish Smith (7)	Wells Fargo Center; 10,521	9–59
69	March 18	Oklahoma City	L 97–111	Nik Stauskas (23)	Nerlens Noel (9)	Ish Smith (7)	Wells Fargo Center; 20,388	9–60
70	March 20	Boston	L 105–120	Carl Landry (26)	Grant, Landry, Noel (8)	Ish Smith (8)	Wells Fargo Center; 15,103	9–61
71	March 21	@ Indiana	L 75–91	Canaan, Thompson (15)	Ish Smith (9)	McConnell, Smith (4)	Bankers Life Fieldhouse; 16,155	9–62
72	March 23	@ Denver	L 103–104	T. J. McConnell (17)	Robert Covington (9)	Ish Smith (8)	Pepsi Center; 10,684	9–63
73	March 26	@ Portland	L 105–108	Covington, Thompson, Smith (17)	Ish Smith (14)	Ish Smith (9)	Moda Center; 19,506	9–64
74	March 27	@ Golden State	L 106–117	Carl Landry (22)	Robert Covington (11)	Ish Smith (10)	Oracle Arena; 19,596	9–65
75	March 29	Charlotte	L 85–100	Robert Covington (18)	Hollis Thompson (10)	Ish Smith (6)	Wells Fargo Center; 14,486	9–66

April : 1–6 (home: 1–3; road: 0–3)

Game	Date	Team	Score	High points	High rebounds	High assists	Location Attendance	Record
76	April 1	@ Charlotte	L 91–100	Grant, Thompson (17)	Elton Brand (11)	T. J. McConnell (7)	Time Warner Cable Arena; 19,244	9–67
77	April 2	Indiana	L 102–115	Isaiah Canaan (24)	Elton Brand (10)	Ish Smith (7)	Wells Fargo Center; 19,213	9–68
78	April 5	New Orleans	W 107–93	Carl Landry (21)	Carl Landry (9)	T. J. McConnell (8)	Wells Fargo Center; 10,978	10–68
79	April 8	New York	L 102–109	Robert Covington (30)	Robert Covington (11)	Ish Smith (7)	Wells Fargo Center; 16,076	10–69
80	April 10	Milwaukee	L 108–109 (OT)	Ish Smith (22)	Nerlens Noel (13)	T. J. McConnell (9)	Wells Fargo Center; 16,267	10–70
81	April 12	@ Toronto	L 98–122	Robert Covington (24)	Nerlens Noel (10)	Ish Smith (4)	Air Canada Centre; 19,800	10–71
82	April 13	@ Chicago	L 105–115	Robert Covington (27)	Nerlens Noel (6)	T. J. McConnell (9)	United Center; 21,777	10–72

2015–16 season schedule

  - Denotes home game sellout.

Atlantic Division	W	L	PCT	GB	Home	Road	Div	GP
y – Toronto Raptors	56	26	.683	–	32‍–‍9	24‍–‍17	14–2	82
x – Boston Celtics	48	34	.585	8.0	28‍–‍13	20‍–‍21	10–6	82
e – New York Knicks	32	50	.390	24.0	18‍–‍23	14‍–‍27	8–8	82
e – Brooklyn Nets	21	61	.256	35.0	14‍–‍27	7‍–‍34	6–10	82
e – Philadelphia 76ers	10	72	.122	46.0	7‍–‍34	3‍–‍38	2–14	82

Eastern Conference
#	Team	W	L	PCT	GB	GP
1	c – Cleveland Cavaliers *	57	25	.695	–	82
2	y – Toronto Raptors *	56	26	.683	1.0	82
3	y – Miami Heat *	48	34	.585	9.0	82
4	x – Atlanta Hawks	48	34	.585	9.0	82
5	x – Boston Celtics	48	34	.585	9.0	82
6	x – Charlotte Hornets	48	34	.585	9.0	82
7	x – Indiana Pacers	45	37	.549	12.0	82
8	x – Detroit Pistons	44	38	.537	13.0	82
9	e – Chicago Bulls	42	40	.512	15.0	82
10	e – Washington Wizards	41	41	.500	16.0	82
11	e – Orlando Magic	35	47	.427	22.0	82
12	e – Milwaukee Bucks	33	49	.402	24.0	82
13	e – New York Knicks	32	50	.390	25.0	82
14	e – Brooklyn Nets	21	61	.256	36.0	82
15	e – Philadelphia 76ers	10	72	.122	47.0	82

== Announcers ==
Name	Reporter	Network	Number of Season
Marc Zumoff	TV Play by Play	CSN; TCN	21
Alaa Abdelnaby	Color Commentator	CSN; TCN	1
Molly French	Sideline Reporter	CSN; TCN	6
Tom McGinnis	Radio Play by Play	WPEN	26
Matt Cord	Arena PA	N/A	18

== Roster ==
2015–16 Philadelphia 76ers roster
Players

Pos.	No.	Player	Height	Weight	DOB	From
F	42	Elton Brand	6 ft 9 in (2.06 m)	254 lb (115 kg)	1979–03–11	Duke
G	0	Isaiah Canaan	6 ft 0 in (1.83 m)	201 lb (91 kg)	1991–05–21	Murray State
F	33	Robert Covington	6 ft 9 in (2.06 m)	215 lb (98 kg)	1990–12–14	Tennessee State
C	21	Joel Embiid	7 ft 0 in (2.13 m)	250 lb (113 kg)	1994–03–16	Kansas
F	39	Jerami Grant	6 ft 8 in (2.03 m)	210 lb (95 kg)	1994–03–12	Syracuse
F	22	Richaun Holmes	6 ft 10 in (2.08 m)	245 lb (111 kg)	1993–10–15	Bowling Green
F	7	Carl Landry	6 ft 9 in (2.06 m)	248 lb (112 kg)	1983–09–19	Purdue
G	5	Kendall Marshall	6 ft 4 in (1.93 m)	200 lb (91 kg)	1991–08–19	North Carolina
G	12	T. J. McConnell	6 ft 2 in (1.88 m)	200 lb (91 kg)	1992–03–25	Arizona
F/C	4	Nerlens Noel	6 ft 11 in (2.11 m)	228 lb (103 kg)	1994–04–10	Kentucky
C	8	Jahlil Okafor	6 ft 11 in (2.11 m)	275 lb (125 kg)	1995–12–15	Duke
G	1	Ish Smith	6 ft 0 in (1.83 m)	175 lb (79 kg)	1988–07–05	Wake Forest
G	11	Nik Stauskas	6 ft 6 in (1.98 m)	205 lb (93 kg)	1993–10–07	Michigan
G/F	31	Hollis Thompson	6 ft 8 in (2.03 m)	206 lb (93 kg)	1991–04–03	Georgetown
F	35	Christian Wood	6 ft 11 in (2.11 m)	220 lb (100 kg)	1995–09–27	UNLV

Coaches
Head coach
- Brett Brown
Assistant(s)
- Mike D'Antoni (associate HC)
- Billy Lange
- Lloyd Pierce
- Chris Babcock (player development)
- Eugene Burroughs (player development)
- Sean Rooks (player development)

Legend
- (DP) Unsigned draft pick
- (FA) Free agent
- (S) Suspended
- (DL) On assignment to
  D-League affiliate
- Injured

Roster
Updated: 2016–04–10

=== Roster notes ===
- Center Joel Embiid missed the entire season due to a right foot injury.

== Awards ==
The following are some awards that took place during the 2015 season for Sixers players.

- Eastern Conference Rookie of the Month (Jahlil Okafor) December
- Eastern Conference Rookie of the Month (T. J. McConnell) February
- NBA All-Rookie First Team (Jahlil Okafor)

== Player statistics ==
Legend
GP	Games played	GS	Games started	MPG	Minutes per game
FG%	Field-goal percentage	3P%	3-point field-goal percentage	FT%	Free-throw percentage
RPG	Rebounds per game	APG	Assists per game	SPG	Steals per game
BPG	Blocks per game	PPG	Points per game

=== Regular season ===
Player	GP	GS	MPG	FG%	3P%	FT%	RPG	APG	SPG	BPG	PPG
T. J. McConnell	81	17	19.8	.470	.348	.634	3.1	4.5	1.2	.1	6.1
Jerami Grant	77	52	26.8	.419	.240	.658	4.7	1.8	.7	1.6	9.7
Isaiah Canaan	77	39	25.5	.360	.363	.833	2.3	1.8	.7	.2	11.0
Hollis Thompson	77	17	28.0	.397	.380	.719	3.5	1.3	.5	.3	9.8
Nik Stauskas	73	35	24.8	.385	.326	.771	2.5	1.9	.6	.3	8.5
Nerlens Noel	67	62	29.3	.521	.500	.590	8.1	1.8	1.8	1.5	11.1
Robert Covington	67	49	28.4	.385	.353	.791	6.3	1.4	1.6	.6	12.8
Jahlil Okafor	53	48	30.0	.508	.167	.686	7.0	1.2	.4	1.2	17.5
Richaun Holmes	51	1	13.8	.514	.182	.689	2.6	.6	.4	.8	5.6
Ish Smith^{†}	50	50	32.4	.405	.336	.669	4.3	7.0	1.3	.4	14.7
JaKarr Sampson^{†}	47	18	14.7	.426	.176	.639	2.7	.6	.2	.3	5.1
Carl Landry	36	12	15.8	.556	.462	.736	4.1	.9	.3	.3	9.8
Kendall Marshall	30	6	13.3	.364	.327	.692	.9	2.4	.5	.1	3.7
Elton Brand	17	1	13.2	.431	.000	.889	3.7	1.1	.5	.5	4.1
Christian Wood	17	0	8.5	.415	.364	.619	2.2	.2	.3	.4	3.6
Phil Pressey^{†}	14	0	12.1	.382	.308	.500	1.6	3.3	.8	.1	3.9
Tony Wroten	8	3	18.0	.338	.176	.541	2.6	2.5	.4	.0	8.4
Sonny Weems^{†}	7	0	11.1	.333	.222	.500	1.7	.3	.0	.0	2.4

- ^{†} Denotes player spent time with another team in the season. Stats reflect time with the 76ers only.

== Transactions ==
=== Trades ===
July 10, 2015	To Philadelphia 76ers Nik Stauskas; Carl Landry; Jason Thompson; Future First Round Pick	To Sacramento Kings Artūras Gudaitis Draft Rights; Luka Mitrović Draft Rights
December 24, 2015	To Philadelphia 76ers Ish Smith	To New Orleans Pelicans 2016 NBA draft 2nd Round Pick (from Denver); 2017 NBA Draft 2nd Round Pick

=== Free agents ===
==== Additions ====
Player	Signed	Former Team
Pierre Jackson	Signed 3-year contract worth $2.6 million	Fenerbahçe Ülker
Scottie Wilbekin	Signed 4-year contract worth $3.5 million	AEK Athens
Kendall Marshall	Signed	Milwaukee Bucks / Phoenix Suns
Christian Wood	Signed multiple times this season	UNLV Runnin' Rebels / Philadelphia 76ers / Delaware 87ers
Elton Brand	Signed	Atlanta Hawks
Sonny Weems	Claimed off waivers	Phoenix Suns

==== Subtractions ====
Player	Reason Left	New Team
Thomas Robinson	Signed 2-year contract worth $2 million	Brooklyn Nets
Luc Mbah a Moute	Signed contract	Los Angeles Clippers
Jason Richardson	Signed 1–year deal worth $1.5 million / Retired	Atlanta Hawks / Retirement
Henry Sims	Signed contract	Phoenix Suns / Grand Rapids Drive / Brooklyn Nets
Furkan Aldemir	Waived	(Turkey) Darüşşafaka & Doğuş
Ish Smith	Signed contract	Washington Wizards / New Orleans Pelicans / Philadelphia 76ers
Gerald Wallace	Waived	Unknown
Scottie Wilbekin	Waived	(Turkey) Darüşşafaka & Doğuş
Arsalan Kazemi	Waived rights away	Atlanta Hawks / Houston Rockets / (Iran) Samen Mash'had
Pierre Jackson	Waived	Idaho Stampede / Texas Legends
Tony Wroten	Waived	New York Knicks
Christian Wood	Waived multiple times this season	Delaware 87ers / Philadelphia 76ers
JaKarr Sampson	Waived	Denver Nuggets
Sonny Weems	Waived	(Israel) Maccabi Tel Aviv
