= 2015–16 Charlotte Hornets season =

NBA professional basketball team season

- Head coach: Steve Clifford
- General manager: Rich Cho
- Owners: Michael Jordan
- Arena: Time Warner Cable Arena

Results
- Record: 48–34 (.585)
- Place: Division: 3rd (Southeast); Conference: 6th (Eastern)
- Playoff finish: First Round (lost to Heat 3–4)
- Stats at Basketball Reference

Local media
- Television: Fox Sports Carolinas, Fox Sports Southeast
- Radio: WFNZ

The 2015–16 Charlotte Hornets season was the 26th season of the franchise in the National Basketball Association (NBA) and the fourth season under head coach Steve Clifford. With 48–34 record, the Hornets qualified for the playoffs for the tenth time in Charlotte pro basketball history as a sixth seed, where they played the third-seeded Miami Heat. In a tight playoff match, the Hornets lost the first two games in Miami, before winning three straight games. Miami took games 6 and 7, winning the series.

As of 2026, this marks the last season the Hornets have made the playoffs. With the Sacramento Kings making the playoffs in 2023, the Hornets now hold the longest active playoff drought in the NBA.

== 2015 NBA draft ==
Round	Pick	Player	Position	Nationality	School/club team
1	9	Frank Kaminsky	Center	United States	Wisconsin
2	39	Juan Pablo Vaulet	Small forward	Argentina	Estudiantes de Bahía Blanca

The Hornets entered the draft with one first-round selection and one second-round selection.

== Roster ==
2015–16 Charlotte Hornets roster
Players

Pos.	No.	Player	Height	Weight	DOB	From
G/F	5	Nicolas Batum	6 ft 8 in (2.03 m)	200 lb (91 kg)	1988–12–14	France
G	30	Troy Daniels	6 ft 4 in (1.93 m)	205 lb (93 kg)	1991–07–15	VCU
G	12	Jorge Gutiérrez	6 ft 3 in (1.91 m)	189 lb (86 kg)	1988–12–27	California
F	50	Tyler Hansbrough	6 ft 9 in (2.06 m)	250 lb (113 kg)	1985–11–03	North Carolina
G	9	Aaron Harrison	6 ft 6 in (1.98 m)	210 lb (95 kg)	1994–10–28	Kentucky
C	00	Spencer Hawes	7 ft 1 in (2.16 m)	245 lb (111 kg)	1988–04–28	Washington
C	25	Al Jefferson	6 ft 10 in (2.08 m)	289 lb (131 kg)	1985–01–04	Prentiss HS (MS)
C	44	Frank Kaminsky	7 ft 0 in (2.13 m)	240 lb (109 kg)	1993–04–04	Wisconsin
F	14	Michael Kidd-Gilchrist	6 ft 7 in (2.01 m)	232 lb (105 kg)	1993–09–26	Kentucky
G	3	Jeremy Lamb	6 ft 5 in (1.96 m)	185 lb (84 kg)	1992–05–30	Connecticut
G	1	Courtney Lee	6 ft 5 in (1.96 m)	200 lb (91 kg)	1985–10–03	Western Kentucky
G	7	Jeremy Lin	6 ft 3 in (1.91 m)	200 lb (91 kg)	1988–08–23	Harvard
G	15	Kemba Walker	6 ft 1 in (1.85 m)	184 lb (83 kg)	1990–05–08	Connecticut
F	2	Marvin Williams	6 ft 9 in (2.06 m)	237 lb (108 kg)	1986–06–19	North Carolina
F/C	40	Cody Zeller	7 ft 0 in (2.13 m)	240 lb (109 kg)	1992–10–05	Indiana

Coaches
Head coach
- Steve Clifford
Assistant(s)
- Patrick Ewing (associate HC)
- Stephen Silas
- Bob Weiss
- Pat Delany
- Bruce Kreutzer
- Steve Hetzel

Legend
- (DP) Unsigned draft pick
- (FA) Free agent
- (S) Suspended
- (DL) On assignment to D-League affiliate
- Injured

Roster
Updated: 2016–04–03

== Preseason ==
2015 pre-season game log
Pre-season: 7–1 (home: 3–0; road: 4–1)

Game	Date	Team	Score	High points	High rebounds	High assists	Location Attendance	Record
1	October 3	@ Orlando	106–100	Jeremy Lin (17)	Al Jefferson (9)	Kemba Walker (8)	Amway Center; 14,942	1–0
2	October 4	@ Miami	90–77	Brian Roberts (21)	Frank Kaminsky (11)	Kaminsky, Roberts (3)	American Airlines Arena; 19,600	2–0
3	October 11	L. A. Clippers	106–94	Lin, Zeller (16)	Spencer Hawes (13)	Kemba Walker (5)	(China) Shenzhen Universiade Sports Centre (Shenzhen); 17,376	3–0
4	October 14	@ L. A. Clippers	113–71	Al Jefferson (17)	Nicolas Batum (10)	Nicolas Batum (5)	(China) Mercedes-Benz Arena (Shanghai); 15,905	4–0
5	October 17	New York	97–93	Al Jefferson (12)	Hansbrough, Kaminsky (8)	Frank Kaminsky (3)	Time Warner Cable Arena; 11,632	5–0
6	October 19	Chicago	94–86	Kemba Walker (22)	Jeremy Lin (8)	Jeremy Lin (5)	Time Warner Cable Arena; 8,769	6–0
7	October 21	@ Detroit	99–94	Batum, Lin (18)	Nicolas Batum (10)	Nicolas Batum (6)	The Palace of Auburn Hills; 11,096	7–0
8	October 22	@ Indiana	86–98	Frank Kaminsky (19)	Hansbrough, Zeller (9)	Brian Roberts (5)	Allen County War Memorial Coliseum; 10,744	7–1

2015–16 season schedule

== Regular season ==
=== Game log ===
2015–16 game log
Total: 48–34 (home: 30–11; road: 18–23)
October: 0–2 (home: 0–0; road: 0–2)

Game	Date	Team	Score	High points	High rebounds	High assists	Location Attendance	Record
1	October 28	@ Miami	L 94–104	Kemba Walker (19)	Cody Zeller (12)	Kemba Walker (4)	American Airlines Arena; 19,724	0–1
2	October 30	@ Atlanta	L 94–97	Nicolas Batum (14)	Nicolas Batum (12)	Kemba Walker (6)	Philips Arena; 17,024	0–2

November : 10–5 (home: 8–2; road: 2–3)

Game	Date	Team	Score	High points	High rebounds	High assists	Location Attendance	Record
3	November 1	Atlanta	L 92–94	Kemba Walker (20)	Al Jefferson (10)	Nicolas Batum (8)	Time Warner Cable Arena; 18,691	0–3
4	November 3	Chicago	W 130–105	Jeremy Lamb (20)	Marvin Williams (10)	Kemba Walker (5)	Time Warner Cable Arena; 15,136	1–3
5	November 5	@ Dallas	W 108–94	Al Jefferson (31)	Marvin Williams (12)	Kemba Walker (7)	American Airlines Center; 19,635	2–3
6	November 7	@ San Antonio	L 94–114	Kemba Walker (23)	Al Jefferson (7)	Batum, Walker (4)	AT&T Center; 18,418	2–4
7	November 10	@ Minnesota	W 104–95	Jeremy Lin (19)	Marvin Williams (10)	Kemba Walker (6)	Target Center; 14,722	3–4
8	November 11	New York	W 95–93	Nicolas Batum (24)	Batum, Jefferson (5)	Spencer Hawes (5)	Time Warner Cable Arena; 16,643	4-4
9	November 13	@ Chicago	L 97–102	Nicolas Batum (28)	Lamb, Walker (9)	Kemba Walker (7)	United Center; 21,749	4–5
10	November 15	Portland	W 106–94	Nicolas Batum (33)	Nicolas Batum (6)	Marvin Williams (8)	Time Warner Cable Arena; 15,317	5–5
11	November 17	@ New York	L 94–102	Kemba Walker (31)	Batum, Lamb (6)	Lamb, Lin (3)	Madison Square Garden; 19,812	5–6
12	November 18	Brooklyn	W 116–111	Nicolas Batum (24)	Lin, Williams (9)	Nicolas Batum (8)	Time Warner Cable Arena; 14,040	6–6
13	November 20	Philadelphia	W 113–88	Al Jefferson (26)	Al Jefferson (10)	Kemba Walker (7)	Time Warner Cable Arena; 17,926	7–6
14	November 23	Sacramento	W 127–122 (OT)	Kemba Walker (39)	Nicolas Batum (10)	Nicolas Batum (8)	Time Warner Cable Arena; 14,163	8–6
15	November 25	Washington	W 101–87	Walker, Batum (16)	Jefferson, Williams (11)	Nicolas Batum (11)	Time Warner Cable Arena; 17,064	9–6
16	November 27	Cleveland	L 90–95	Kemba Walker (18)	Lamb, Batum (8)	Batum, Lin, Walker (4)	Time Warner Cable Arena; 19,093	9–7
17	November 29	Milwaukee	W 87–82	Kemba Walker (22)	Jeremy Lamb (9)	Nicolas Batum (5)	Time Warner Cable Arena; 14,224	10–7

December : 7–7 (home: 5–4; road: 2–3)

Game	Date	Team	Score	High points	High rebounds	High assists	Location Attendance	Record
18	December 2	Golden State	L 99–116	Nicolas Batum (17)	Nicolas Batum (8)	Brian Roberts (5)	Time Warner Cable Arena; 19,542	10–8
19	December 5	@ Chicago	W 102–96	Nicolas Batum (24)	Nicolas Batum (11)	Batum, Walker (5)	United Center; 21,770	11–8
20	December 7	Detroit	W 104–84	Cody Zeller (20)	Marvin Williams (12)	Nicholas Batum (8)	Time Warner Cable Arena; 15,481	12–8
21	December 9	Miami	W 99–81	Walker, Williams (18)	Nicolas Batum (11)	Nicolas Batum (11)	Time Warner Cable Arena; 17,404	13–8
22	December 11	@ Memphis	W 123–99	Kemba Walker (33)	Kaminsky, Williams (6)	Kemba Walker (6)	FedEx Forum; 17,111	14–8
23	December 12	Boston	L 93–98	Nicolas Batum (21)	Batum, Hawes (8)	Kemba Walker (4)	Time Warner Cable Arena; 18,490	14–9
24	December 16	@ Orlando	L 98–113	Jeremy Lamb (16)	Kaminsky, Lamb, Williams (5)	Kemba Walker (9)	Amway Center; 16,019	14–10
25	December 17	Toronto	W 109–99 (OT)	Jeremy Lin (35)	Hawes, Williams (10)	Kemba Walker (7)	Time Warner Cable Arena; 15,817	15–10
26	December 19	@ Washington	L 101–109	Kemba Walker (18)	Marvin Williams (9)	Nicolas Batum (8)	Verizon Center; 16,987	15–11
27	December 21	@ Houston	L 95–102	Kemba Walker (14)	Cody Zeller (7)	Kemba Walker (6)	Toyota Center; 18,236	15–12
28	December 23	Boston	L 89–102	Frank Kaminsky (23)	Cody Zeller (10)	Nicolas Batum (7)	Time Warner Cable Arena; 19,082	15–13
29	December 26	Memphis	W 98–92	Kemba Walker (22)	Nicolas Batum (11)	Batum, Walker (8)	Time Warner Cable Arena; 19,091	16–13
30	December 28	L.A. Lakers	W 108–98	Kemba Walker (38)	Marvin Williams (11)	Nicolas Batum (11)	Time Warner Cable Arena; 19,632	17–13
31	December 30	L.A. Clippers	L 117–122	Kemba Walker (29)	Batum, Zeller (8)	Kemba Walker (7)	Time Warner Cable Arena; 19,145	17–14

January : 6–11 (home: 3–2; road: 3–9)

Game	Date	Team	Score	High points	High rebounds	High assists	Location Attendance	Record
32	January 1	@ Toronto	L 94–104	Kemba Walker (18)	Cody Zeller (9)	Nicolas Batum (7)	Air Canada Centre; 19,800	17–15
33	January 2	Oklahoma City	L 90–109	Kemba Walker (32)	Marvin Williams (8)	Kemba Walker (5)	Time Warner Cable Arena; 19,387	17–16
34	January 4	@ Golden State	L 101–111	Kemba Walker (22)	Cody Zeller (10)	Spencer Hawes (4)	Oracle Arena; 19,596	17–17
35	January 6	@ Phoenix	L 102–111	Kemba Walker (25)	Cody Zeller (11)	Kemba Walker (6)	Talking Stick Resort Arena; 16,910	17–18
36	January 9	@ L.A. Clippers	L 83–97	Jeremy Lin (26)	Lamb, Zeller (13)	Jeremy Lin (4)	Staples Center; 19,060	17–19
37	January 10	@ Denver	L 92–95	Lamb, Zeller (15)	Jeremy Lamb (8)	Nicolas Batum (7)	Pepsi Center; 11,343	17–20
38	January 13	Atlanta	W 107–84	Kemba Walker (23)	Cody Zeller (10)	Nicolas Batum (10)	Time Warner Cable Arena; 15,334	18–20
39	January 15	@ New Orleans	L 107–109	Batum, Walker (25)	Cody Zeller (8)	Nicolas Batum (8)	Smoothie King Center; 16,876	18–21
40	January 16	Milwaukee	L 92–105	Jeremy Lin (15)	Spencer Hawes (9)	Nicolas Batum (9)	Time Warner Cable Arena; 18,288	18–22
41	January 18	Utah	W 124–119 (OT)	Kemba Walker (52)	Batum, Walker (9)	Kemba Walker (8)	Time Warner Cable Arena; 17,459	19–22
42	January 20	@ Oklahoma City	L 95–109	Kemba Walker (21)	Batum, Hawes, Kaminsky (6)	Frank Kaminsky (4)	Chesapeake Energy Arena; 18,203	19–23
43	January 22	@ Orlando	W 120–116 (OT)	Kemba Walker (40)	Marvin Williams (14)	Kemba Walker (9)	Amway Center; 18,083	20–23
44	January 23	New York	W 97–84	Lin, Walker (26)	Marvin Williams (12)	Lin, Walker (5)	Time Warner Cable Arena; 17,768	21–23
45	January 25	@ Sacramento	W 129–128 (2OT)	Troy Daniels (28)	Frank Kaminsky (8)	Jeremy Lin (11)	Sleep Train Arena; 16,991	22–23
46	January 27	@ Utah	L 73–102	Kemba Walker (15)	Nicolas Batum (10)	Batum, Hawes (2)	Vivint Smart Home Arena; 16,683	22–24
47	January 29	@ Portland	L 91–109	Marvin Williams (20)	Tyler Hansbrough (14)	Nicolas Batum (8)	Moda Center; 19,393	22–25
48	January 31	@ L.A. Lakers	W 101–82	Marvin Williams (19)	Kidd-Gilchrist, Williams (12)	Kemba Walker (6)	Staples Center; 18,997	23–25

February : 7–3 (home: 3–1; road: 4–2)

Game	Date	Team	Score	High points	High rebounds	High assists	Location Attendance	Record
49	February 3	Cleveland	W 106–97	Jeremy Lin (24)	Michael Kidd-Gilchrist (13)	Jeremy Lin (8)	Time Warner Cable Arena; 19,189	24–25
50	February 5	Miami	L 95–98	Marvin Williams (27)	Cody Zeller (8)	Nicolas Batum (7)	Time Warner Cable Arena; 19,147	24–26
51	February 6	Washington	W 108–104	Nicolas Batum (26)	Nicolas Batum (11)	Nicolas Batum (9)	Time Warner Cable Arena; 18,450	25–26
52	February 8	Chicago	W 108–91	Kemba Walker (30)	Nicolas Batum (13)	Batum, Walker (8)	Time Warner Cable Arena; 15,886	26–26
53	February 10	@ Indiana	W 117–95	Kemba Walker (25)	Cody Zeller (11)	Nicolas Batum (6)	Bankers Life Fieldhouse; 15,653	27–26
All-Star Break
54	February 19	@ Milwaukee	W 98–95	Kemba Walker (25)	Cody Zeller (9)	Kemba Walker (4)	BMO Harris Bradley Center; 16,370	28–26
55	February 21	@ Brooklyn	W 104–96	Kemba Walker (28)	Marvin Williams (12)	Nicolas Batum (8)	Barclays Center; 16,155	29–26
56	February 24	@ Cleveland	L 103–114	Kemba Walker (20)	Marvin Williams (10)	Batum, Walker (6)	Quicken Loans Arena; 20,562	29–27
57	February 26	@ Indiana	W 96–95	Marvin Williams (26)	Marvin Williams (13)	Kemba Walker (10)	Bankers Life Fieldhouse; 18,165	30–27
58	February 28	@ Atlanta	L 76–87	Marvin Williams (16)	Marvin Williams (9)	Kemba Walker (5)	Philips Arena; 17,156	30–28

March : 13–3 (home: 8–2; road: 5–1)

Game	Date	Team	Score	High points	High rebounds	High assists	Location Attendance	Record
59	March 1	Phoenix	W 126–92	Kemba Walker (26)	Nicolas Batum (9)	Kemba Walker (9)	Time Warner Cable Arena; 16,849	31–28
60	March 2	@ Philadelphia	W 119–99	Kemba Walker (30)	Marvin Williams (9)	Nicolas Batum (7)	Wells Fargo Center; 11,143	32–28
61	March 4	Indiana	W 108–101	Kemba Walker (33)	Cody Zeller (11)	Kemba Walker (10)	Time Warner Cable Arena; 19,099	33–28
62	March 7	Minnesota	W 108–103	Kemba Walker (34)	Walker, Williams (7)	Kemba Walker (6)	Time Warner Cable Arena; 15,912	34–28
63	March 9	New Orleans	W 122–113	Kemba Walker (35)	Cody Zeller (8)	Kemba Walker (7)	Time Warner Cable Arena; 16,335	35–28
64	March 11	Detroit	W 118–103	Marvin Williams (22)	Lee, Williams (6)	Nicholas Batum (11)	Time Warner Cable Arena; 18,189	36–28
65	March 12	Houston	W 125–109	Kemba Walker (26)	Al Jefferson (10)	Nicholas Batum (8)	Time Warner Cable Arena; 19,303	37–28
66	March 14	Dallas	L 96–107	Kemba Walker (25)	Cody Zeller (9)	Kemba Walker (9)	Time Warner Cable Arena; 15,686	37–29
67	March 16	Orlando	W 107–99	Batum, Williams (26)	Cody Zeller (13)	Nicholas Batum (9)	Time Warner Cable Arena; 16,148	38–29
68	March 17	@ Miami	W 109–106	Jefferson, Walker (21)	Al Jefferson (10)	Batum, Walker (7)	American Airlines Arena; 19,848	39–29
69	March 19	Denver	L 93–101	Nicolas Batum (24)	Nicolas Batum (8)	Nicolas Batum (9)	Time Warner Cable Arena; 19,271	39–30
70	March 21	San Antonio	W 91–88	Jeremy Lin (29)	Cody Zeller (14)	Batum, Zeller (3)	Time Warner Cable Arena; 18,260	40–30
71	March 22	@ Brooklyn	W 105–100	Nicolas Batum (22)	Frank Kaminsky (7)	Jefferson, Lin, Walker (4)	Barclays Center; 15,739	41–30
72	March 25	@ Detroit	L 105–112	Kemba Walker (29)	Al Jefferson (7)	Nicholas Batum (7)	Palace of Auburn Hills; 17,209	41–31
73	March 26	@ Milwaukee	W 115–91	Nicholas Batum (25)	Marvin Williams (8)	Nicholas Batum (8)	BMO Harris Bradley Center; 15,544	42–31
74	March 29	@ Philadelphia	W 100–85	Nicholas Batum (19)	Nicholas Batum (12)	Nicholas Batum (12)	Wells Fargo Center; 14,486	43–31

April : 5–3 (home: 3–0; road: 2–3)

Game	Date	Team	Score	High points	High rebounds	High assists	Location Attendance	Record
75	April 1	Philadelphia	W 100–91	Kemba Walker (27)	Kemba Walker (11)	Nicholas Batum (7)	Time Warner Cable Arena; 19,244	44–31
76	April 3	@ Cleveland	L 103–112	Kemba Walker (29)	Spencer Hawes (9)	Kemba Walker (7)	Quicken Loans Arena; 20,562	44–32
77	April 5	@ Toronto	L 90–96	Jeremy Lin (21)	Al Jefferson (11)	Jeremy Lin (7)	Air Canada Centre; 19,800	44–33
78	April 6	@ New York	W 111–97	Kemba Walker (34)	Al Jefferson (8)	Courtney Lee (6)	Madison Square Garden; 19,812	45–33
79	April 8	Brooklyn	W 113–99	Kemba Walker (22)	Al Jefferson (9)	Nicholas Batum (6)	Time Warner Cable Arena; 18,337	46–33
80	April 10	@ Washington	L 98–113	Frank Kaminsky (18)	Frank Kaminsky (11)	Kemba Walker (7)	Verizon Center; 19,187	46–34
81	April 11	@ Boston	W 114–100	Jeremy Lin (25)	Al Jefferson (11)	Kemba Walker (6)	TD Garden; 18,624	47–34
82	April 13	Orlando	W 117–103	Al Jefferson (26)	Jeremy Lamb (9)	Kemba Walker (8)	Time Warner Cable Arena; 17,372	48–34

2015–16 season schedule

== Playoffs ==
=== Game log ===
2016 playoff game log
Total: 3–4 (home: 2–1; road: 1–3)
First Round: 3–4 (home: 2–1; road: 1–3)

Game	Date	Team	Score	High points	High rebounds	High assists	Location Attendance	Series
1	April 17	@ Miami	L 91–123	Nicolas Batum (21)	Cody Zeller (7)	Jeremy Lin (3)	American Airlines Arena; 19,600	0–1
2	April 20	@ Miami	L 103–115	Kemba Walker (29)	Batum, Jefferson (7)	Batum, Walker (3)	American Airlines Arena; 19,650	0–2
3	April 23	Miami	W 96–80	Jeremy Lin (18)	Marvin Williams (14)	Kemba Walker (7)	Time Warner Cable Arena; 19,604	1–2
4	April 25	Miami	W 89–85	Kemba Walker (34)	Spencer Hawes (8)	Jefferson, Lin (3)	Time Warner Cable Arena; 19,156	2–2
5	April 27	@ Miami	W 90–88	Marvin Williams (17)	Marvin Williams (8)	Jeremy Lin (7)	American Airlines Arena; 19,685	3–2
6	April 29	Miami	L 90–97	Kemba Walker (37)	Al Jefferson (7)	Kemba Walker (5)	Time Warner Cable Arena; 19,636	3–3
7	May 1	@ Miami	L 73–106	Frank Kaminsky (13)	Cody Zeller (7)	Kemba Walker (6)	American Airlines Arena; 19,868	3–4

2016 playoff schedule

== Standings ==
Southeast Division	W	L	PCT	GB	Home	Road	Div	GP
y – Miami Heat	48	34	.585	–	28‍–‍13	20‍–‍21	10–6	82
x – Atlanta Hawks	48	34	.585	–	27‍–‍14	21‍–‍20	8–8	82
x – Charlotte Hornets	48	34	.585	–	30‍–‍11	18‍–‍23	8–8	82
e – Washington Wizards	41	41	.500	7.0	22‍–‍19	19‍–‍22	10–6	82
e – Orlando Magic	35	47	.427	13.0	23‍–‍18	12‍–‍29	4–12	82

Eastern Conference
#	Team	W	L	PCT	GB	GP
1	c – Cleveland Cavaliers *	57	25	.695	–	82
2	y – Toronto Raptors *	56	26	.683	1.0	82
3	y – Miami Heat *	48	34	.585	9.0	82
4	x – Atlanta Hawks	48	34	.585	9.0	82
5	x – Boston Celtics	48	34	.585	9.0	82
6	x – Charlotte Hornets	48	34	.585	9.0	82
7	x – Indiana Pacers	45	37	.549	12.0	82
8	x – Detroit Pistons	44	38	.537	13.0	82
9	e – Chicago Bulls	42	40	.512	15.0	82
10	e – Washington Wizards	41	41	.500	16.0	82
11	e – Orlando Magic	35	47	.427	22.0	82
12	e – Milwaukee Bucks	33	49	.402	24.0	82
13	e – New York Knicks	32	50	.390	25.0	82
14	e – Brooklyn Nets	21	61	.256	36.0	82
15	e – Philadelphia 76ers	10	72	.122	47.0	82

== Player statistics ==
=== Regular season ===
Player	POS	GP	GS	MP	REB	AST	STL	BLK	PTS	MPG	RPG	APG	SPG	BPG	PPG
Kemba Walker	PG	81	81	2,885	357	421	126	39	1,689	35.6	4.4	5.2	1.6	.5	20.9
Marvin Williams	PF	81	81	2,338	521	110	58	77	948	28.9	6.4	1.4	.7	1.0	11.7
Frank Kaminsky	C	81	3	1,708	335	98	38	43	606	21.1	4.1	1.2	.5	.5	7.5
Jeremy Lin	SG	78	13	2,048	253	235	58	42	914	26.3	3.2	3.0	.7	.5	11.7
Cody Zeller	C	73	60	1,774	455	71	57	63	638	24.3	6.2	1.0	.8	.9	8.7
Nicolas Batum	SF	70	70	2,448	428	403	65	43	1,046	35.0	6.1	5.8	.9	.6	14.9
Jeremy Lamb	SG	66	0	1,227	252	77	42	30	580	18.6	3.8	1.2	.6	.5	8.8
Spencer Hawes	PF	57	6	1,035	244	109	22	27	340	18.2	4.3	1.9	.4	.5	6.0
P. J. Hairston^{†}	SF	48	43	938	128	29	24	7	286	19.5	2.7	.6	.5	.1	6.0
Al Jefferson	C	47	18	1,096	301	70	30	41	562	23.3	6.4	1.5	.6	.9	12.0
Tyler Hansbrough	PF	44	0	343	89	8	12	7	104	7.8	2.0	.2	.3	.2	2.4
Troy Daniels	SG	43	0	476	57	21	11	3	242	11.1	1.3	.5	.3	.1	5.6
Brian Roberts^{†}	PG	30	0	333	29	38	7	1	145	11.1	1.0	1.3	.2	.0	4.8
Courtney Lee^{†}	SG	28	28	845	87	60	33	12	250	30.2	3.1	2.1	1.2	.4	8.9
Aaron Harrison	SG	21	0	93	15	2	6	0	18	4.4	.7	.1	.3	.0	.9
Jorge Gutiérrez	PG	12	0	63	7	17	3	0	22	5.3	.6	1.4	.3	.0	1.8
Michael Kidd-Gilchrist	SF	7	7	205	45	9	3	3	89	29.3	6.4	1.3	.4	.4	12.7

- ^{†} Denotes player spent time with another team in the season. Stats reflect time with the Hornets only.

=== Playoffs ===
Player	POS	GP	GS	MP	REB	AST	STL	BLK	PTS	MPG	RPG	APG	SPG	BPG	PPG
Kemba Walker	PG	7	7	260	21	28	9	4	159	37.1	3.0	4.0	1.3	.6	22.7
Courtney Lee	SG	7	7	257	20	9	6	3	60	36.7	2.9	1.3	.9	.4	8.6
Marvin Williams	PF	7	7	228	48	6	6	3	36	32.6	6.9	.9	.9	.4	5.1
Frank Kaminsky	C	7	5	190	30	8	6	5	50	27.1	4.3	1.1	.9	.7	7.1
Al Jefferson	C	7	5	168	43	8	4	3	93	24.0	6.1	1.1	.6	.4	13.3
Cody Zeller	C	7	2	137	37	2	1	3	59	19.6	5.3	.3	.1	.4	8.4
Jeremy Lin	SG	7	0	189	16	18	5	0	87	27.0	2.3	2.6	.7	.0	12.4
Nicolas Batum	SF	5	2	144	18	10	2	0	57	28.8	3.6	2.0	.4	.0	11.4
Spencer Hawes	PF	5	0	53	16	3	1	2	18	10.6	3.2	.6	.2	.4	3.6
Troy Daniels	SG	4	0	18	2	0	0	0	2	4.5	.5	.0	.0	.0	.5
Jeremy Lamb	SG	3	0	12	4	1	0	0	11	4.0	1.3	.3	.0	.0	3.7
Jorge Gutiérrez	PG	3	0	12	2	2	0	0	0	4.0	.7	.7	.0	.0	.0
Aaron Harrison	SG	2	0	7	1	0	0	0	0	3.5	.5	.0	.0	.0	.0
Tyler Hansbrough	PF	2	0	6	0	0	0	0	0	3.0	.0	.0	.0	.0	.0
