= Hollis Thompson =

American basketball player (born 1991)

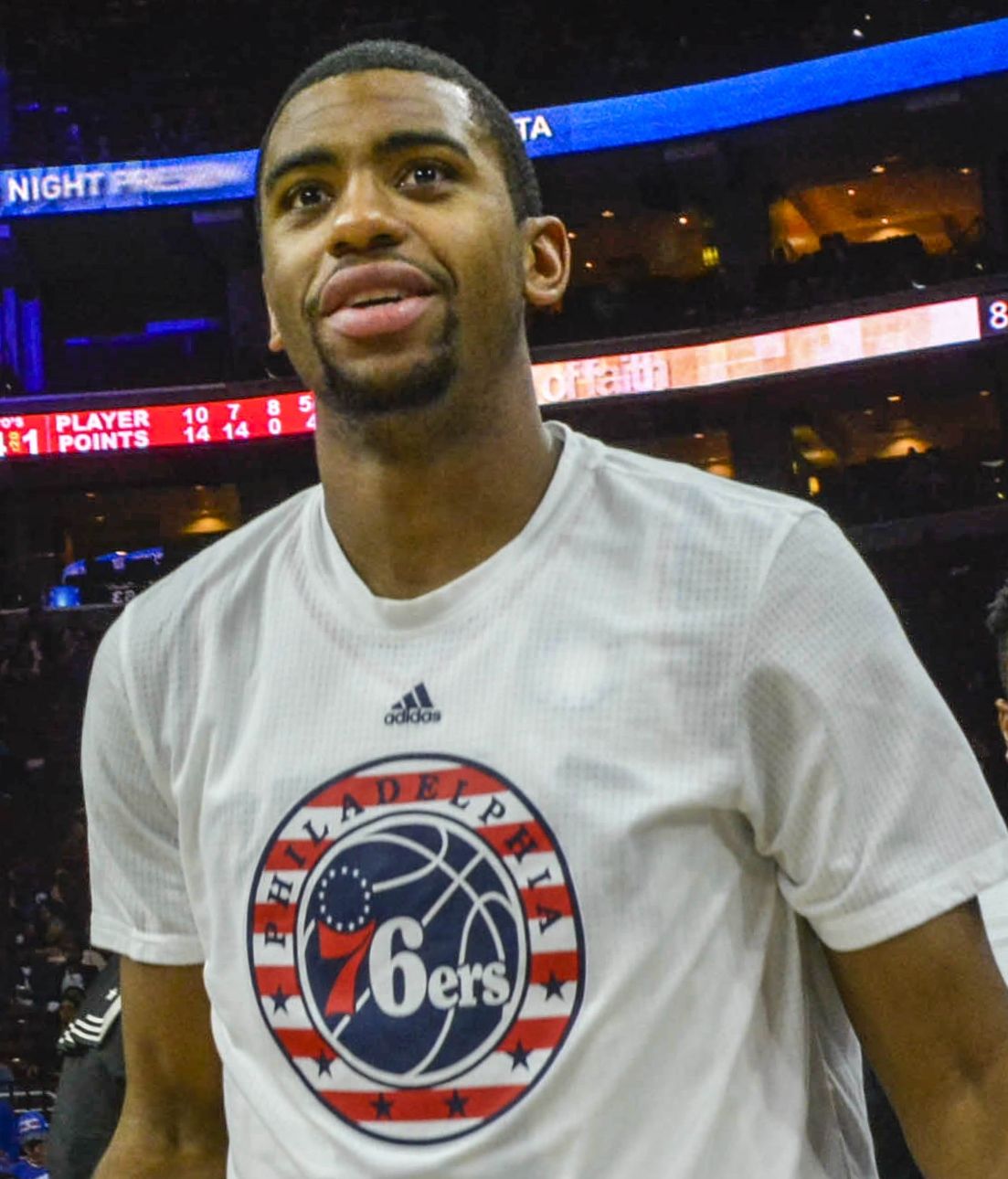
- Thompson with the 76ers in 2015

Free agent
- Position: Shooting guard / small forward

Personal information
- Born: April 3, 1991 (age 35) Pasadena, California, U.S.
- Listed height: 6 ft 7 in (2.01 m)
- Listed weight: 190 lb (86 kg)

Career information
- High school: Loyola (Los Angeles, California)
- College: Georgetown (2009–2012)
- NBA draft: 2012: undrafted
- Playing career: 2012–present

Career history
- 2012–2013: Tulsa 66ers
- 2013–2017: Philadelphia 76ers
- 2017: Austin Spurs
- 2017: New Orleans Pelicans
- 2017–2018: Olympiacos
- 2018–2019: Northern Arizona Suns
- 2019: Crailsheim Merlins
- 2019–2020: Stockton Kings
- 2022–2023: Al-Ahli Jeddah
- 2024–2026: Al-Nasr Benghazi
- 2026: Caballeros de Culiacán
- Stats at NBA.com
- Stats at Basketball Reference

Keith Hollis Thompson II (born April 3, 1991) is an American professional basketball player for Al-Nasr Benghazi of the Libyan Division I Basketball League. He played college basketball for the Georgetown Hoyas. He also played for the Philadelphia 76ers and New Orleans Pelicans for a total of 265 games in the NBA.

== High school career ==
Thompson attended Loyola High School in Los Angeles, California. As a junior in 2007–08, he averaged 18.6 points, 9.0 rebounds and 4.0 assists per game, going on to be named the league's most valuable player.

Considered a four-star recruit by Rivals.com, Thompson was listed as the No. 12 small forward and the No. 63 player in the nation in 2009.

== College career ==
In January 2009, Thompson enrolled at Georgetown University and practiced with the team during the second semester.

During his three-season collegiate career at Georgetown, Thompson averaged 8.7 points, 4.1 rebounds and 1.1 assists in 24.6 minutes per game, while setting a school record with 44.0% three-point field goal shooting. In the 2011–12 season, he earned All-Big East Honorable Mention honors after averaging 12.8 ppg and scoring in double figures on 25 occasions.

== Professional career ==
=== Tulsa 66ers (2012–2013) ===
After going undrafted in the 2012 NBA draft, Thompson signed with the Oklahoma City Thunder on July 11, 2012. On October 27, 2012, he was waived by the Thunder after appearing in three preseason games. Four days later, he was acquired by the Tulsa 66ers of the NBA Development League as an affiliate player of the Thunder. In 51 games for Tulsa in 2012–13, he averaged 8.0 points and 3.9 rebounds per game.

=== Philadelphia 76ers (2013–2017) ===
In July 2013, Thompson joined the San Antonio Spurs for the 2013 NBA Summer League. On September 24, 2013, he signed with the Philadelphia 76ers. He became an important part of the 76ers' rotation during the 2013–14 season as he contributed as a defender and a three-point shooter. He became the starting small forward during the second half of the season and scored a then career-high 18 points with six made three-pointers on April 5 in a 105–101 loss to the Brooklyn Nets. He finished the season leading all rookies in three-point field goal percentage with 40.1%.

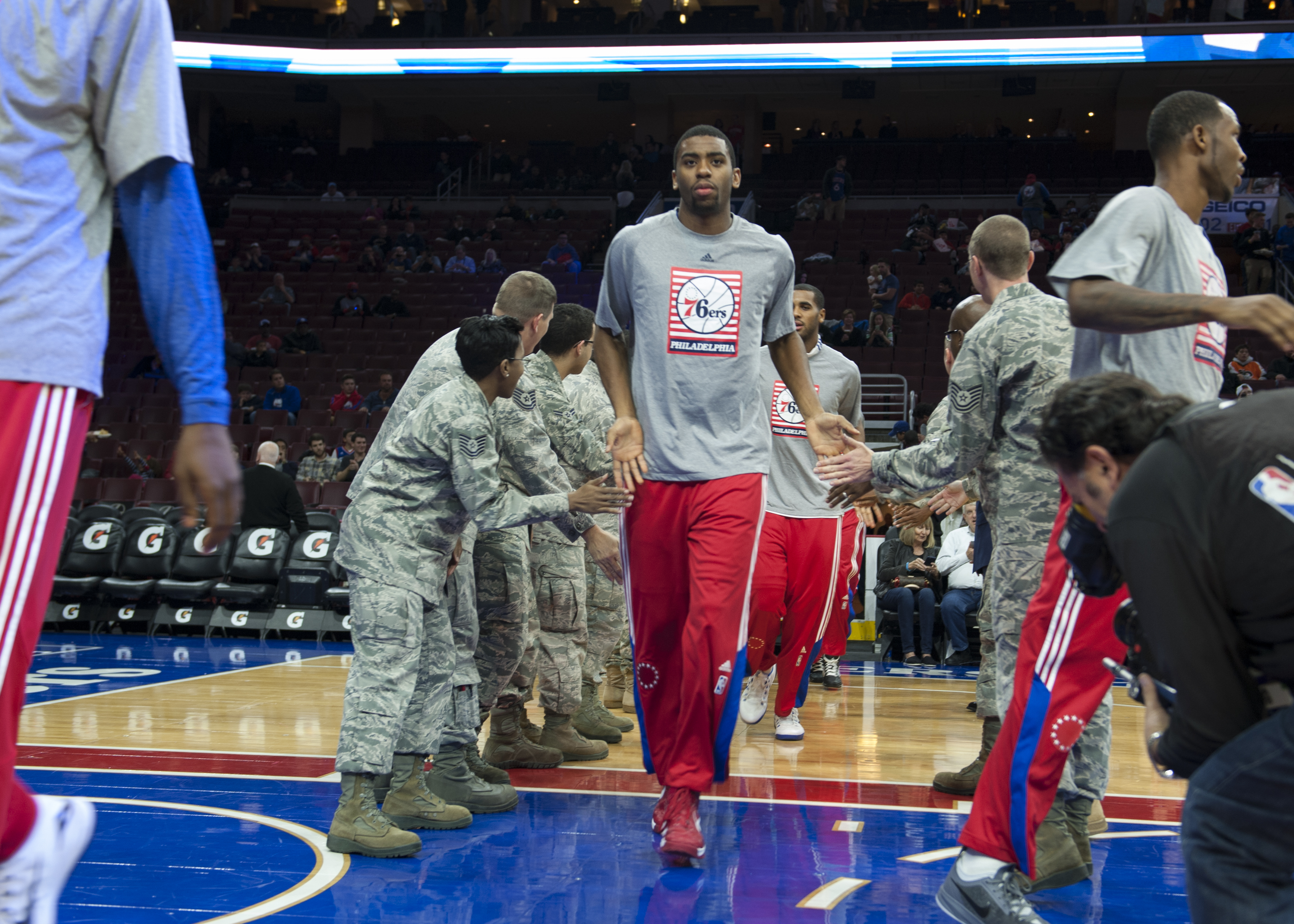
Thompson in 2014

In July 2014, Thompson joined the 76ers for the 2014 NBA Summer League, where he helped lead the team to the Orlando Summer league championship. On December 13, 2014, he tied his career high of 21 points in a 120–115 overtime loss to the Memphis Grizzlies. On February 3, 2015, he set a new career high with 23 points in a 105–98 win over the Denver Nuggets.

In 2015–16, Thompson proved to be a valuable member of the 76ers on offense and was a serviceable defender. While his shooting numbers declined slightly from 2014 to 2015, he was still the team's best long-range shooter. Thompson's field goal percentage (41.3 to 39.7) and three-point percentage (40.1 to 38.0) each dropped in 2015–16, but he still averaged career highs in both points (9.8) and rebounds (3.5) per game. In the 76ers' season finale on April 13, 2016, Thompson scored a season-high 21 points in 115–105 loss to the Chicago Bulls.

On June 29, 2016, the 76ers exercised the fourth-year team option on Thompson's contract, retaining him for the 2016–17 season. On January 4, 2017, he was waived by the 76ers. Thompson is currently 6th all time in Sixers history in three-point FG% (38.9%).

=== Austin and New Orleans (2017) ===
On January 24, 2017, Thompson was acquired by the Windy City Bulls of the NBA Development League. The following day, he was traded to the Austin Spurs in exchange for Jarell Eddie. On February 23, 2017, Thompson signed a 10-day contract with the New Orleans Pelicans. On March 5, 2017, he signed a second 10-day contract with the Pelicans. Following the expiration of his second 10-day contract, Thompson returned to Austin. Thompson averaged 14.4 ppg for Austin during the 2016–17 season, shooting 44% from 3.

=== Olympiacos (2017–2018) ===
On August 10, 2017, Thompson signed a one-year contract with the Greek club Olympiacos. He was released from the Greek club on May 5, 2018.

=== Northern Arizona Suns (2018–2019) ===
On December 17, 2018, the Northern Arizona Suns announced that they had acquired the returning rights to Thompson and Livio Jean-Charles from the Austin Spurs for the returning rights to Isaiah Canaan and Josh Gray. On next day, the Northern Arizona Suns announced that they had activated Thompson.

Thompson averaged 16.6 ppg, 6.3 rpg, and 2.5 apg during the 2018–19 G-League season, shooting 35% from 3 and 80% from the free-throw line.

=== Crailsheim Merlins (2019) ===
On April 1, 2019, Thompson signed with Crailsheim Merlins.

=== Stockton Kings (2019–2020) ===
On October 11, 2019, Thompson signed with the Sacramento Kings for training camp. He was ultimately cut and assigned to their G League affiliate, the Stockton Kings.

== Career statistics ==
Legend
GP	Games played	GS	Games started	MPG	Minutes per game
FG%	Field-goal percentage	3P%	3-point field-goal percentage	FT%	Free-throw percentage
RPG	Rebounds per game	APG	Assists per game	SPG	Steals per game
BPG	Blocks per game	PPG	Points per game	PIR	Performance index rating
**Bold**	Career high

=== NBA ===
==== Regular season ====
Year	Team	GP	GS	MPG	FG%	3P%	FT%	RPG	APG	SPG	BPG	PPG
2013–14	Philadelphia	**77**	**41**	22.6	**.460**	**.401**	.712	3.2	.9	.7	.2	6.0
2014–15	Philadelphia	71	23	25.0	.413	**.401**	.708	2.8	1.2	**.8**	**.4**	8.8
2015–16	Philadelphia	**77**	17	**28.0**	.397	.380	**.719**	**3.5**	**1.3**	.5	.3	**9.8**
2016–17	Philadelphia	31	1	18.1	.415	.366	.650	2.7	.8	.5	.2	5.5
2016–17	New Orleans	9	8	21.2	.268	.250	.667	3.1	1.0	.7	.0	3.8
Career		265	90	24.2	.413	.386	.707	3.1	1.1	.6	.3	7.7

=== EuroLeague ===
Year	Team	GP	GS	MPG	FG%	3P%	FT%	RPG	APG	SPG	BPG	PPG	PIR
2017–18	Olympiacos	28	7	15.1	.417	.265	.674	2.7	.9	.6	.1	5.6	4.9
Career		28	7	15.1	.417	.265	.674	2.7	.9	.6	.1	5.6	4.9
