= 2015–16 Orlando Magic season =

NBA professional basketball team season

- Head coach: Scott Skiles
- General manager: Rob Hennigan
- Owners: RDV Sports, Inc.
- Arena: Amway Center

Results
- Record: 35–47 (.427)
- Place: Division: 5th (Southeast); Conference: 11th (Eastern)
- Playoff finish: Did not qualify
- Stats at Basketball Reference

Local media
- Television: Fox Sports Florida, Sun Sports
- Radio: WDBO

The 2015–16 Orlando Magic season was the 27th season of the franchise in the National Basketball Association (NBA). They began the season hoping to improve upon their 25–57 output the previous season. They managed to improve by 10 games, finishing 35–47, but had missed the playoffs for a fourth straight year.

== Draft picks ==
Round	Pick	Player	Position	Nationality	College
1	5	Mario Hezonja	SG / SF	Croatia	Barcelona
2	51	Tyler Harvey	PG / SG	United States	Eastern Washington

== Pre-season ==
2015 pre-season game log
Total: 6–2 (Home: 3–1; Road: 3–1)
Pre-season: 6–2 (home: 3–1; road: 3–1)

Game	Date	Team	Score	High points	High rebounds	High assists	Location Attendance	Record
1	October 3	Charlotte	100–106	Andrew Nicholson (23)	Andrew Nicholson (8)	C. J. Watson (5)	Amway Center; 14,942	0–1
2	October 7	vs. Miami	100–97	Evan Fournier (18)	Nikola Vučević (8)	C. J. Watson (6)	KFC Yum! Center; 6,123	1–1
3	October 8	@ Indiana	92–97	Victor Oladipo (15)	Tobias Harris (13)	Marble, Payton, Vučević (4)	Gainbridge Fieldhouse; 13,475	1–2
4	October 11	@ Houston	123–119	Roy Devyn Marble (21)	Smith, Watson (7)	Smith, Watson (5)	State Farm Arena; 6,130	2–2
5	October 13	Miami	95–92 OT	Shabazz Napier (15)	Dewayne Dedmon (13)	C. J. Watson (7)	Amway Center; 16,105	3–2
6	October 17	@ Flamengo	90–73	Nikola Vučević (18)	Victor Oladipo (9)	Victor Oladipo (3)	HSBC Arena; 14,894	4–2
7	October 21	New Orleans	110–107 OT	Nikola Vučević (24)	Nikola Vučević (14)	C. J. Watson (7)	Amway Center; 12,779	5–2
8	October 23	Memphis	86–76	Tobias Harris (18)	Dewayne Dedmon (11)	Shabazz Napier (8)	Amway Center; 12,155	6–2

2015–16 season schedule

== Regular season ==
=== Standings ===
Southeast Division	W	L	PCT	GB	Home	Road	Div	GP
y – Miami Heat	48	34	.585	–	28‍–‍13	20‍–‍21	10–6	82
x – Atlanta Hawks	48	34	.585	–	27‍–‍14	21‍–‍20	8–8	82
x – Charlotte Hornets	48	34	.585	–	30‍–‍11	18‍–‍23	8–8	82
e – Washington Wizards	41	41	.500	7.0	22‍–‍19	19‍–‍22	10–6	82
e – Orlando Magic	35	47	.427	13.0	23‍–‍18	12‍–‍29	4–12	82

Eastern Conference
#	Team	W	L	PCT	GB	GP
1	c – Cleveland Cavaliers *	57	25	.695	–	82
2	y – Toronto Raptors *	56	26	.683	1.0	82
3	y – Miami Heat *	48	34	.585	9.0	82
4	x – Atlanta Hawks	48	34	.585	9.0	82
5	x – Boston Celtics	48	34	.585	9.0	82
6	x – Charlotte Hornets	48	34	.585	9.0	82
7	x – Indiana Pacers	45	37	.549	12.0	82
8	x – Detroit Pistons	44	38	.537	13.0	82
9	e – Chicago Bulls	42	40	.512	15.0	82
10	e – Washington Wizards	41	41	.500	16.0	82
11	e – Orlando Magic	35	47	.427	22.0	82
12	e – Milwaukee Bucks	33	49	.402	24.0	82
13	e – New York Knicks	32	50	.390	25.0	82
14	e – Brooklyn Nets	21	61	.256	36.0	82
15	e – Philadelphia 76ers	10	72	.122	47.0	82

== Game log ==
=== Regular season ===
2015–16 game log
Total: 35–47 (Home: 23–18; Road: 12–29)
October: 0–2 (home: 0–2; road: 0–0)

Game	Date	Team	Score	High points	High rebounds	High assists	Location Attendance	Record
1	October 28	Washington	L 87–88	Victor Oladipo (17)	Victor Oladipo (11)	Elfrid Payton (8)	Amway Center; 18,846	0–1
2	October 30	Oklahoma City	L 136–139 (2OT)	Tobias Harris (30)	Victor Oladipo (13)	Victor Oladipo (10)	Amway Center; 18,846	0–2

November : 9–6 (home: 7–1; road: 2–5)

Game	Date	Team	Score	High points	High rebounds	High assists	Location Attendance	Record
3	November 1	@ Chicago	L 87–92	Evan Fournier (19)	Nikola Vučević (11)	Victor Oladipo (5)	United Center; 21,585	0–3
4	November 3	@ New Orleans	W 103–94	Evan Fournier (30)	Harris, Vučević (13)	Elfrid Payton (10)	Smoothie King Center; 16,876	1–3
5	November 4	@ Houston	L 114–119 (OT)	Evan Fournier (29)	Aaron Gordon (8)	Elfrid Payton (7)	Toyota Center; 16,735	1–4
6	November 6	Toronto	W 92–87	Tobias Harris (20)	Tobias Harris (9)	Oladipo, Napier (6)	Amway Center; 16,578	2–4
7	November 7	@ Philadelphia	W 105–97	Elfrid Payton (20)	Dewayne Dedmon (9)	C. J. Watson (7)	Wells Fargo Center; 15,207	3–4
8	November 9	@ Indiana	L 84–97	Evan Fournier (21)	Tobias Harris (10)	Elfrid Payton (7)	Bankers Life Fieldhouse; 13,104	3–5
9	November 11	L.A. Lakers	W 101–99	Shabazz Napier (22)	Tobias Harris (11)	Elfrid Payton (8)	Amway Center; 18,846	4–5
10	November 13	Utah	W 102–93	Evan Fournier (21)	Tobias Harris (13)	Elfrid Payton (6)	Amway Center; 16,709	5–5
11	November 14	@ Washington	L 99–108	Nikola Vučević (19)	Nikola Vučević (13)	Evan Fournier (6)	Verizon Center; 18,311	5–6
12	November 18	Minnesota	W 104–101 (OT)	Evan Fournier (26)	Tobias Harris (11)	Elfrid Payton (6)	Amway Center; 16,048	6–6
13	November 21	Sacramento	L 91–97	Tobias Harris (24)	Nikola Vučević (11)	Elfrid Payton (9)	Amway Center; 16,104	6–7
14	November 23	@ Cleveland	L 103–117	Andrew Nicholson (18)	Andrew Nicholson (8)	Shabazz Napier (9)	Quicken Loans Arena; 20,562	6–8
15	November 25	New York	W 100–91	Victor Oladipo (24)	Nikola Vučević (12)	Elfrid Payton (11)	Amway Center; 18,846	7–8
16	November 27	Milwaukee	W 114–90	Elfrid Payton (22)	Andrew Nicholson (7)	Elfrid Payton (10)	Amway Center; 16,317	8–8
17	November 29	Boston	W 110–91	Victor Oladipo (19)	Tobias Harris (11)	Victor Oladipo (6)	Amway Center; 16,209	9–8

December : 10–5 (home: 5–3; road: 5–2)

Game	Date	Team	Score	High points	High rebounds	High assists	Location Attendance	Record
18	December 1	@ Minnesota	W 96–93	Nikola Vučević (18)	Nikola Vučević (12)	Elfrid Payton (5)	Target Center; 10,694	10–8
19	December 3	@ Utah	W 103–94	Tobias Harris (17)	Nikola Vučević (8)	Elfrid Payton (7)	Vivint Smart Home Arena; 19,247	11–8
20	December 5	@ L.A. Clippers	L 101–103	Victor Oladipo (24)	Harris, Vučević (10)	Elfrid Payton (8)	Staples Center; 19,146	11–9
21	December 8	@ Denver	W 85–74	Payton, Vučević (18)	Andrew Nicholson (14)	Elfrid Payton (4)	Pepsi Center; 13,925	12–9
22	December 9	@ Phoenix	L 104–107	Nikola Vučević (21)	Nikola Vučević (12)	Elfrid Payton (10)	Talking Stick Resort Arena; 17,637	12–10
23	December 11	Cleveland	L 76–111	Nikola Vučević (14)	Andrew Nicholson (6)	Shabazz Napier (5)	Amway Center; 17,239	12–11
24	December 14	@ Brooklyn	W 105–82	Nikola Vučević (18)	Tobias Harris (9)	Frye, Payton (5)	Barclays Center; 12,946	13–11
25	December 16	Charlotte	W 113–98	Channing Frye (17)	Nikola Vučević (8)	Elfrid Payton (9)	Amway Center; 16,019	14–11
26	December 18	Portland	W 102–94	Harris, Vučević (25)	Tobias Harris (12)	Victor Oladipo (6)	Amway Center; 17,156	15–11
27	December 20	Atlanta	L 100–103	Nikola Vučević (20)	Nikola Vučević (11)	Oladipo, Payton (6)	Amway Center; 16,982	15–12
28	December 21	@ New York	W 107–99	Nikola Vučević (26)	Nikola Vučević (9)	Shabazz Napier (6)	Madison Square Garden; 19,812	16–12
29	December 23	Houston	W 104–101	Nikola Vučević (21)	Tobias Harris (8)	Elfrid Payton (9)	Amway Center; 17,061	17–12
30	December 26	Miami	L 101–108	Nikola Vučević (22)	Nikola Vučević (10)	Fournier, Payton (7)	Amway Center; 18,846	17–13
31	December 28	New Orleans	W 104–89	Nikola Vučević (28)	Tobias Harris (9)	Nikola Vučević (7)	Amway Center; 17,606	18–13
32	December 30	Brooklyn	W 100–93	Nikola Vučević (20)	Nikola Vučević (9)	Evan Fournier (5)	Amway Center; 18,397	19–13

January : 2–12 (home: 1–5; road: 1–7)

Game	Date	Team	Score	High points	High rebounds	High assists	Location Attendance	Record
33	January 1	@ Washington	L 91–103	Victor Oladipo (20)	Tobias Harris (10)	Elfrid Payton (7)	Verizon Center; 16,986	19–14
34	January 2	@ Cleveland	L 79–104	Aaron Gordon (11)	Aaron Gordon (7)	Elfrid Payton (4)	Quicken Loans Arena; 20,562	19–15
35	January 4	@ Detroit	L 89–115	Victor Oladipo (18)	Victor Oladipo (7)	Victor Oladipo (5)	The Palace of Auburn Hills; 14,301	19–16
36	January 6	Indiana	L 86–95	Victor Oladipo (20)	Aaron Gordon (8)	Evan Fournier (4)	Amway Center; 18,846	19–17
37	January 8	@ Brooklyn	W 83–77	Oladipo, Vučević (20)	Tobias Harris (12)	Tobias Harris (8)	Barclays Center; 13,907	20–17
38	January 9	Washington	L 99–105	Nikola Vučević (23)	Aaron Gordon (10)	Oladipo, Vučević (5)	Amway Center; 18,058	20–18
39	January 14	Toronto	L 103–106 (OT)	Victor Oladipo (27)	Harris, Vučević (11)	Victor Oladipo (6)	The O2 Arena (London, England/NBA Global Games); 18,689	20–19
40	January 18	@ Atlanta	L 81–98	Aaron Gordon (18)	Nikola Vučević (11)	Elfrid Payton (5)	Philips Arena; 17,460	20–20
41	January 20	Philadelphia	L 87–96	Elfrid Payton (21)	Nikola Vučević (11)	Elfrid Payton (10)	Amway Center; 17,746	20–21
42	January 22	Charlotte	L 116–120 (OT)	Victor Oladipo (29)	Nikola Vučević (12)	Elfrid Payton (10)	Amway Center; 18,083	20–22
43	January 25	@ Memphis	L 102–108 (OT)	Fournier, Harris, Vučević (16)	Nikola Vučević (14)	Elfrid Payton (6)	FedExForum; 15,779	20–23
44	January 26	@ Milwaukee	L 100–107	Victor Oladipo (18)	Nikola Vučević (12)	Victor Oladipo (5)	BMO Harris Bradley Center; 11,884	20–24
45	January 29	@ Boston	L 94–113	Nikola Vučević (14)	Aaron Gordon (9)	Nikola Vučević (4)	TD Garden; 17,729	20–25
46	January 31	Boston	W 119–114	Evan Fournier (24)	Aaron Gordon (14)	Nikola Vučević (7)	Amway Center; 18,846	21–25

February : 5–7 (home: 3–4; road: 2–3)

Game	Date	Team	Score	High points	High rebounds	High assists	Location Attendance	Record
47	February 1	@ San Antonio	L 92–107	Nikola Vučević (20)	Aaron Gordon (16)	Elfrid Payton (8)	AT&T Center; 18,418	21–26
48	February 3	@ Oklahoma City	L 114–117	Victor Oladipo (37)	Harris, Oladipo (7)	Elfrid Payton (6)	Chesapeake Energy Arena; 18,203	21–27
49	February 5	L.A. Clippers	L 93–107	Victor Oladipo (18)	Nikola Vučević (9)	Napier, Vucevic (4)	Amway Center; 16,647	21–28
50	February 7	Atlanta	W 96–94	Nikola Vučević (22)	Aaron Gordon (13)	Elfrid Payton (12)	Amway Center; 16,021	22–28
51	February 8	@ Atlanta	W 117–110 (OT)	Nikola Vučević (28)	Nikola Vučević (13)	Victor Oladipo (8)	Philips Arena; 13,057	23–28
52	February 10	San Antonio	L 96–98	Evan Fournier (28)	Aaron Gordon (14)	Elfrid Payton (7)	Amway Center; 17,467	23–29
All-Star Break
53	February 19	Dallas	W 110–104 (OT)	Nikola Vučević (21)	Victor Oladipo (14)	Evan Fournier (8)	Amway Center; 17,764	24–29
54	February 21	Indiana	L 102–105	Evan Fournier (23)	Nikola Vučević (13)	Victor Oladipo (8)	Amway Center; 17,242	24–30
55	February 23	@ Philadelphia	W 124–115	Nikola Vučević (35)	Aaron Gordon (11)	Elfrid Payton (8)	Wells Fargo Center; 13,745	25–30
56	February 25	Golden State	L 114–130	Evan Fournier (20)	Nikola Vučević (9)	Elfrid Payton (6)	Amway Center; 19,189	25–31
57	February 26	@ New York	L 95–108	Nikola Vučević (18)	Gordon, Vučević (8)	Elfrid Payton (9)	Madison Square Garden; 19,812	25–32
58	February 28	Philadelphia	W 130–116	Oladipo, Vučević (28)	Aaron Gordon (7)	Elfrid Payton (10)	Amway Center; 16,168	26–32

March : 6–11 (home: 4–2; road: 2–9)

Game	Date	Team	Score	High points	High rebounds	High assists	Location Attendance	Record
59	March 1	@ Dallas	L 108–121	Ersan İlyasova (22)	Ersan İlyasova (10)	C. J. Watson (6)	American Airlines Center; 19,546	26–33
60	March 2	Chicago	W 102–89	Nikola Vučević (24)	Aaron Gordon (15)	Elfrid Payton (12)	Amway Center; 16,072	27–33
61	March 4	Phoenix	L 84–102	Elfrid Payton (19)	İlyasova, Vučević (12)	Elfrid Payton (11)	Amway Center; 17,546	27–34
62	March 7	@ Golden State	L 113–119	Fournier, Gordon, Jennings (20)	Aaron Gordon (16)	Victor Oladipo (8)	Oracle Arena; 19,596	27–35
63	March 8	@ L.A. Lakers	L 98–107	Victor Oladipo (26)	Dewayne Dedmon (10)	C.J. Watson (5)	Staples Center; 18,997	27–36
64	March 11	@ Sacramento	W 107–100	Aaron Gordon (20)	Aaron Gordon (11)	Evan Fournier (6)	Sleep Train Arena; 17,081	28–36
65	March 12	@ Portland	L 84–121	Victor Oladipo (18)	Ersan İlyasova (9)	C.J. Watson (4)	Moda Center; 19,452	28–37
66	March 15	Denver	W 116–110	Evan Fournier (30)	Jason Smith (13)	Brandon Jennings (11)	Amway Center; 16,988	29–37
67	March 16	@ Charlotte	L 99–107	Victor Oladipo (25)	Brandon Jennings (8)	C.J. Watson (7)	Time Warner Cable Arena; 16,148	29–38
68	March 18	Cleveland	L 103–109	Victor Oladipo (45)	Aaron Gordon (10)	Brandon Jennings (7)	Amway Center; 18,046	29–39
69	March 20	@ Toronto	L 100–105	Fournier, Oladipo (21)	İlyasova, Nicholson (9)	Brandon Jennings (7)	Air Canada Centre; 19.800	29–40
70	March 21	@ Boston	L 96–107	Victor Oladipo (25)	Gordon, Oladipo (9)	Elfrid Payton (11)	TD Garden; 18,624	29–41
71	March 23	@ Detroit	L 102–118	Elfrid Payton (20)	Aaron Gordon (11)	Elfrid Payton (10)	The Palace of Auburn Hills; 16,609	29–42
72	March 25	@ Miami	L 97–108	Evan Fournier (20)	Fournier, Payton (7)	Elfrid Payton (7)	American Airlines Arena; 19,918	29–43
73	March 26	Chicago	W 111–89	Dewayne Dedmon (18)	Dewayne Dedmon (13)	Elfrid Payton (10)	Amway Center; 18,846	30–43
74	March 29	Brooklyn	W 139–105	Andrew Nicholson (24)	Payton, Smith (5)	Elfrid Payton (12)	Amway Center; 17,536	31–43
75	March 31	@ Indiana	W 114–94	Evan Fournier (25)	Payton, Oladipo (7)	Victor Oladipo (7)	Bankers Life Fieldhouse; 17,234	32–43

April : 3–4 (home: 3–1; road: 0–3)

Game	Date	Team	Score	High points	High rebounds	High assists	Location Attendance	Record
76	April 1	@ Milwaukee	L 110–113	Nikola Vučević (26)	Aaron Gordon (7)	Elfrid Payton (10)	BMO Harris Bradley Center; 16,268	32–44
77	April 3	Memphis	W 119–107	Nikola Vučević (25)	Nikola Vučević (10)	Elfrid Payton (11)	Amway Center; 17,741	33–44
78	April 6	Detroit	L 104–108	Evan Fournier (19)	Nikola Vučević (13)	Elfrid Payton (5)	Amway Center; 16,553	33–45
79	April 8	Miami	W 112–109	Nikola Vučević (29)	Evan Fournier (7)	Elfrid Payton (10)	Amway Center; 18,152	34–45
80	April 10	@ Miami	L 96–118	Evan Fournier (21)	Nikola Vučević (8)	Evan Fournier (5)	American Airlines Arena; 19,913	34–46
81	April 11	Milwaukee	W 107–98	Ersan İlyasova (22)	Dewayne Dedmon (8)	Elfrid Payton (11)	Amway Center; 18,374	35–46
82	April 13	@ Charlotte	L 103–117	Fournier, Gordon (22)	Ersan İlyasova (7)	Elfrid Payton (7)	Time Warner Cable Arena; 17,372	35–47

2015–16 season schedule

== Roster ==
2015–16 Orlando Magic roster
Players

Pos.	No.	Player	Height	Weight	DOB	From
C	3	Dewayne Dedmon	7 ft 0 in (2.13 m)	245 lb (111 kg)	1989-08-12	USC
G/F	10	Evan Fournier	6 ft 7 in (2.01 m)	205 lb (93 kg)	1992-10-29	France
F	00	Aaron Gordon	6 ft 9 in (2.06 m)	220 lb (100 kg)	1995-09-16	Arizona
G/F	23	Mario Hezonja	6 ft 8 in (2.03 m)	218 lb (99 kg)	1995-02-25	Croatia
F	7	Ersan İlyasova	6 ft 10 in (2.08 m)	235 lb (107 kg)	1987-05-15	Turkey
G	55	Brandon Jennings	6 ft 1 in (1.85 m)	169 lb (77 kg)	1989-09-23	Oak Hill Academy (VA)
G/F	11	Devyn Marble	6 ft 6 in (1.98 m)	200 lb (91 kg)	1992-09-21	Iowa
G	13	Shabazz Napier	6 ft 1 in (1.85 m)	175 lb (79 kg)	1991-07-14	Connecticut
F	44	Andrew Nicholson	6 ft 9 in (2.06 m)	250 lb (113 kg)	1989-12-08	St. Bonaventure
G	5	Victor Oladipo	6 ft 4 in (1.93 m)	210 lb (95 kg)	1992-05-04	Indiana
G	4	Elfrid Payton	6 ft 4 in (1.93 m)	185 lb (84 kg)	1994-02-22	Louisiana
F/C	14	Jason Smith	7 ft 0 in (2.13 m)	240 lb (109 kg)	1986-03-02	Colorado State
C	9	Nikola Vučević	7 ft 0 in (2.13 m)	260 lb (118 kg)	1990-10-24	USC
G	32	C. J. Watson	6 ft 2 in (1.88 m)	175 lb (79 kg)	1984-04-17	Tennessee

Coaches
Head coach
- Scott Skiles
Assistant(s)
- Adrian Griffin
- Mario Elie
- Conner Henry
- Monte Mathis
- Jay Hernandez (player development)
- Laron Profit (player development)

Legend
- (DP) Unsigned draft pick
- (FA) Free agent
- (S) Suspended
- (DL) On assignment to D-League affiliate
- Injured

Roster
Updated: March 7, 2016

== Player statistics ==
=== Ragular season ===
Player	POS	GP	GS	MP	REB	AST	STL	BLK	PTS	MPG	RPG	APG	SPG	BPG	PPG
Evan Fournier	SF	79	71	2,566	225	213	96	2	1,213	32.5	2.8	2.7	1.2	.0	15.4
Mario Hezonja	SF	79	9	1,413	176	109	39	17	478	17.9	2.2	1.4	.5	.2	6.1
Aaron Gordon	PF	78	37	1,863	507	128	59	55	719	23.9	6.5	1.6	.8	.7	9.2
Jason Smith	C	76	2	1,181	219	62	33	65	546	15.5	2.9	.8	.4	.9	7.2
Elfrid Payton	PG	73	69	2,145	261	468	89	20	778	29.4	3.6	6.4	1.2	.3	10.7
Victor Oladipo	SG	72	52	2,379	345	282	116	54	1,153	33.0	4.8	3.9	1.6	.8	16.0
Nikola Vučević	C	65	60	2,037	576	179	53	70	1,181	31.3	8.9	2.8	.8	1.1	18.2
Dewayne Dedmon	C	58	20	705	228	13	22	46	255	12.2	3.9	.2	.4	.8	4.4
Andrew Nicholson	PF	56	0	823	201	25	10	22	384	14.7	3.6	.4	.2	.4	6.9
Shabazz Napier	PG	55	0	600	55	97	23	1	203	10.9	1.0	1.8	.4	.0	3.7
Tobias Harris^{†}	PF	49	49	1,610	342	99	47	28	669	32.9	7.0	2.0	1.0	.6	13.7
Channing Frye^{†}	PF	44	29	754	141	45	21	20	229	17.1	3.2	1.0	.5	.5	5.2
C. J. Watson	PG	33	2	656	66	88	19	5	142	19.9	2.0	2.7	.6	.2	4.3
Devyn Marble	SG	28	0	249	38	12	13	1	60	8.9	1.4	.4	.5	.0	2.1
Brandon Jennings^{†}	PG	25	6	452	50	100	18	5	175	18.1	2.0	4.0	.7	.2	7.0
Ersan İlyasova^{†}	PF	22	4	447	121	12	14	6	178	20.3	5.5	.5	.6	.3	8.1
Keith Appling	PG	5	0	27	1	1	1	0	6	5.4	.2	.2	.2	.0	1.2

- ^{†} Denotes player spent time with another team in the season. Stats reflect time with the Magic only.

== Transactions ==
=== Trades ===
June 24, 2015	To Orlando Magic Janis Timma Draft Rights	To Memphis Grizzlies Luke Ridnour
July 14, 2015	To Orlando Magic 2020 Second Round Draft Pick	To Portland Trail Blazers Maurice Harkless
July 27, 2015	To Orlando Magic Shabazz Napier	To Miami Heat Conditional 2016 Second Round Draft Pick

=== Re-signed ===
Player	Signed	Former Team
Tobias Harris	Signed 4-year contract worth $64 million	Orlando Magic

=== Additions ===
Player	Signed	Former Team
C.J. Watson	Signed 3-year contract worth $15 million	Indiana Pacers
Jason Smith	Signed 1-year contract worth $4.5 million	New York Knicks

=== Subtractions ===
Player	Reason	Current team
Ben Gordon	Waived	Free Agent
Kyle O'Quinn	Signed 4-year contract worth $16 million	New York Knicks
