= 2015–16 San Antonio Spurs season =

- Division champions
- Head coach: Gregg Popovich
- President: Gregg Popovich
- General manager: R. C. Buford
- Owner: Peter Holt
- Arena: AT&T Center

Results
- Record: 67–15 (.817)
- Place: Division: 1st (Southwest); Conference: 2nd (Western)
- Playoff finish: Conference Semifinals (lost to Thunder 2–4)
- Stats at Basketball Reference

Local media
- Television: Fox Sports Southwest; KENS HD; CW 35
- Radio: 1200 WOAI

The 2015–16 San Antonio Spurs season was the franchise's 49th season, its 40th in the National Basketball Association (NBA), and its 43rd in the San Antonio area.

Spurs forward Kawhi Leonard was selected to play in the 2016 NBA All-Star Game as a starter. This marked the first All-Star appearance for Leonard. With the acquisitions of David West and LaMarcus Aldridge, the Spurs finished the season with a 67–15 record and achieved the best winning percentage in franchise history. The team earned the Southwest Division title, set a franchise record for most wins in a season with 67, and tied the NBA record for most home wins in a season with 40 (tying the 1985–86 Boston Celtics 40–1 home record). On April 10, the Spurs' home winning streak came to an end with a loss to the defending NBA champion and eventual Western Conference champion Golden State Warriors.

In the first round of the 2016 NBA playoffs, the Spurs faced the injury-depleted Memphis Grizzlies and swept them in four games. However, in the Conference semifinals, the team was defeated 4–2 by the Oklahoma City Thunder and became the first team since the 2007 Dallas Mavericks to finish with 67 wins and be eliminated before the conference finals.

After 19 years, the 2015-2016 season marked the end of the Tim Duncan era; he retired from the NBA following the season. Duncan led the Spurs to five championships and to a playoff appearance in every season of his 19 years in the league. He also won two NBA MVPs and three NBA Finals MVPs. When the Spurs won the NBA championship in 2014, Duncan became the second player (after John Salley) to win championships in three different decades.

== Draft ==
Round	Pick	Player	Position	Nationality	School/club team
1	26	Nikola Milutinov	C	Serbia	Partizan (Serbia)
2	55	Cady Lalanne	C	Haiti	Massachusetts

== Roster ==
2015–16 San Antonio Spurs roster
Players

Pos.	No.	Player	Height	Weight	DOB	From
PF	12	LaMarcus Aldridge	6 ft 11 in (2.11 m)	240 lb (109 kg)	1985-07-19	Texas
SF	1	Kyle Anderson	6 ft 9 in (2.06 m)	230 lb (104 kg)	1993-09-20	UCLA
C	15	Matt Bonner	6 ft 10 in (2.08 m)	235 lb (107 kg)	1980-04-05	Florida
PF	33	Boris Diaw	6 ft 8 in (2.03 m)	250 lb (113 kg)	1982-04-16	INSEP
C	21	Tim Duncan	6 ft 11 in (2.11 m)	255 lb (116 kg)	1976-04-25	Wake Forest
SG	20	Manu Ginóbili	6 ft 6 in (1.98 m)	205 lb (93 kg)	1977-07-28	Argentina
SG	14	Danny Green	6 ft 6 in (1.98 m)	215 lb (98 kg)	1987-06-22	North Carolina
SF	2	Kawhi Leonard	6 ft 7 in (2.01 m)	230 lb (104 kg)	1991-06-29	San Diego State
C	40	Boban Marjanović	7 ft 3 in (2.21 m)	290 lb (132 kg)	1988-08-15	Serbia
SG	23	Kevin Martin	6 ft 7 in (2.01 m)	199 lb (90 kg)	1983-02-01	Western Carolina
PG	24	Andre Miller	6 ft 3 in (1.91 m)	200 lb (91 kg)	1976-03-19	Utah
PG	8	Patty Mills	6 ft 0 in (1.83 m)	185 lb (84 kg)	1988-08-11	Saint Mary's
PG	9	Tony Parker	6 ft 2 in (1.88 m)	185 lb (84 kg)	1982-05-17	INSEP
SG	17	Jonathon Simmons	6 ft 6 in (1.98 m)	195 lb (88 kg)	1989-09-14	Houston
PF	30	David West	6 ft 9 in (2.06 m)	250 lb (113 kg)	1980-08-29	Xavier

Coaches
Head coach
- Gregg Popovich
Assistant(s)
- James Borrego
- Chip Engelland
- Chad Forcier
- Becky Hammon
- Ettore Messina
- Ime Udoka
- Will Sevening (trainer)

Legend
- (DP) Unsigned draft pick
- (FA) Free agent
- (S) Suspended
- Injured

Roster
Updated: March 22, 2016

== Pre-season ==
2015 pre-season game log
Total: 2–4 (home: 2-1; road: 0–3)
Pre-season: 2–4 (home: 2–1; road: 0–3)

Game	Date	Team	Score	High points	High rebounds	High assists	Location Attendance	Record
1	October 8	@ Sacramento	92–95	Kawhi Leonard (16)	Butler, Leonard, Simmons (5)	Patty Mills (5)	Sleep Train Arena; 14,083	0–1
2	October 12	@ Miami	94–97	LaMarcus Aldridge (17)	LaMarcus Aldridge (8)	Tony Parker (5)	American Airlines Arena; 19,600	0–2
3	October 14	@ Atlanta	86–100	Kawhi Leonard (20)	Leonard, West (8)	David West (3)	Philips Arena; 11,801	0–3
4	October 18	Detroit	96–92	Kawhi Leonard (21)	Tim Duncan (10)	Anderson, Ginóbili (5)	AT&T Center; 17,396	1–3
5	October 20	Phoenix	84–104	Kawhi Leonard (14)	LaMarcus Aldridge (6)	Tony Parker (8)	AT&T Center; 15,774	1–4
6	October 23	Houston	111–86	Aldridge, Green (19)	Boban Marjanović (6)	Manu Ginóbili (6)	AT&T Center; 18,059	2–4

2015–16 season schedule

== Regular season ==
=== Standings ===
==== Division ====
Southwest Division	W	L	PCT	GB	Home	Road	Div	GP
y – San Antonio Spurs	67	15	.817	–	40‍–‍1	27‍–‍14	15–1	82
x – Dallas Mavericks	42	40	.512	25.0	23‍–‍18	19‍–‍22	7–9	82
x – Memphis Grizzlies	42	40	.512	25.0	26‍–‍15	16‍–‍25	7–9	82
x – Houston Rockets	41	41	.500	26.0	23‍–‍18	18‍–‍23	8–8	82
e – New Orleans Pelicans	30	52	.366	37.0	21‍–‍20	9‍–‍32	4–12	82

==== Conference ====
Western Conference
#	Team	W	L	PCT	GB	GP
1	z – Golden State Warriors *	73	9	.890	–	82
2	y – San Antonio Spurs *	67	15	.817	6.0	82
3	y – Oklahoma City Thunder *	55	27	.671	18.0	82
4	x – Los Angeles Clippers	53	29	.646	20.0	82
5	x – Portland Trail Blazers	44	38	.537	29.0	82
6	x – Dallas Mavericks	42	40	.512	31.0	82
7	x – Memphis Grizzlies	42	40	.512	31.0	82
8	x – Houston Rockets	41	41	.500	32.0	82
9	e – Utah Jazz	40	42	.488	33.0	82
10	e – Sacramento Kings	33	49	.402	40.0	82
11	e – Denver Nuggets	33	49	.402	40.0	82
12	e – New Orleans Pelicans	30	52	.366	43.0	82
13	e – Minnesota Timberwolves	29	53	.354	44.0	82
14	e – Phoenix Suns	23	59	.280	50.0	82
15	e – Los Angeles Lakers	17	65	.207	56.0	82

=== Game log ===
2015–16 game log
Total: 67–15 (home: 40–1; road: 27–14)
October: 1–1 (home: 1–0; road: 0–1)

Game	Date	Team	Score	High points	High rebounds	High assists	Location Attendance	Record
1	October 28	@ Oklahoma City	L 106–112	Kawhi Leonard (32)	Leonard, Green (8)	Manu Ginóbili (7)	Chesapeake Energy Arena; 18,203	0–1
2	October 30	Brooklyn	W 102–75	Kawhi Leonard (16)	LaMarcus Aldridge (10)	Aldridge, Ginóbili, Parker (4)	AT&T Center; 18,418	1–1

November : 13–3 (home: 8–0; road: 5–3)

Game	Date	Team	Score	High points	High rebounds	High assists	Location Attendance	Record
3	November 1	@ Boston	W 95–87	LaMarcus Aldridge (24)	LaMarcus Aldridge (14)	Aldridge, Duncan (5)	TD Garden; 17,461	2–1
4	November 2	@ New York	W 94–84	LaMarcus Aldridge (19)	Kawhi Leonard (14)	Tim Duncan (6)	Madison Square Garden; 19,812	3–1
5	November 4	@ Washington	L 99–102	Kawhi Leonard (23)	LaMarcus Aldridge (14)	Tim Duncan (5)	Verizon Center; 17,721	3–2
6	November 7	Charlotte	W 114–94	Kawhi Leonard (23)	David West (9)	Tony Parker (6)	AT&T Center; 18,418	4–2
7	November 9	@ Sacramento	W 106–88	Kawhi Leonard (24)	Tim Duncan (14)	Patty Mills (8)	Sleep Train Arena; 17,317	5–2
8	November 11	@ Portland	W 113–101	LaMarcus Aldridge (23)	Kawhi Leonard (7)	Tony Parker (5)	Moda Center; 19,393	6–2
9	November 14	Philadelphia	W 92–83	LaMarcus Aldridge (17)	LaMarcus Aldridge (19)	David West (5)	AT&T Center; 18,717	7–2
10	November 16	Portland	W 93–80	Kawhi Leonard (19)	Duncan, Leonard (9)	Tony Parker (7)	AT&T Center; 18,418	8–2
11	November 18	Denver	W 109–98	Tony Parker (25)	LaMarcus Aldridge (12)	Tony Parker (9)	AT&T Center; 18,418	9–2
12	November 20	@ New Orleans	L 90–104	Kawhi Leonard (22)	LaMarcus Aldridge (11)	Tony Parker (5)	Smoothie King Center; 16,698	9–3
13	November 21	Memphis	W 92–82	Kawhi Leonard (19)	Tim Duncan (10)	Tim Duncan (4)	AT&T Center; 18,418	10–3
14	November 23	Phoenix	W 98–84	Kawhi Leonard (24)	Kawhi Leonard (13)	Tony Parker (8)	AT&T Center; 18,418	11–3
15	November 25	Dallas	W 88–83	Kawhi Leonard (26)	Tim Duncan (9)	Tony Parker (8)	AT&T Center; 18,418	12–3
16	November 27	@ Denver	W 91–80	Kawhi Leonard (25)	Kawhi Leonard (7)	Kawhi Leonard (6)	Pepsi Center; 17,121	13–3
17	November 28	Atlanta	W 108–88	Kawhi Leonard (22)	Tim Duncan (18)	Tony Parker (6)	AT&T Center; 18,418	14–3
18	November 30	@ Chicago	L 89–92	Kawhi Leonard (25)	Aldridge, Duncan (12)	Tony Parker (9)	United Center; 21,909	14–4

December : 14–2 (home: 10–0; road: 4–2)

Game	Date	Team	Score	High points	High rebounds	High assists	Location Attendance	Record
19	December 2	Milwaukee	W 95–70	Tim Duncan (16)	Tim Duncan (10)	Kawhi Leonard (4)	AT&T Center; 18,418	15–4
20	December 3	@ Memphis	W 103–83	Kawhi Leonard (27)	Tim Duncan (10)	Duncan, Parker (5)	FedEx Forum; 17,013	16–4
21	December 5	Boston	W 108–105	LaMarcus Aldridge (18)	Aldridge, Leonard (8)	Tony Parker (6)	AT&T Center; 18,418	17–4
22	December 7	@ Philadelphia	W 119–68	LaMarcus Aldridge (26)	LaMarcus Aldridge (9)	Tony Parker (6)	Wells Fargo Center; 14,449	18–4
23	December 9	@ Toronto	L 94–97	Manu Ginóbili (17)	Aldridge, Leonard (7)	Patty Mills (6)	Air Canada Centre; 19,800	18–5
24	December 11	L.A. Lakers	W 109–87	LaMarcus Aldridge (24)	Aldridge, Leonard (11)	Ray McCallum (5)	AT&T Center; 18,418	19–5
25	December 12	@ Atlanta	W 103–78	Kawhi Leonard (22)	Tim Duncan (10)	Patty Mills (5)	Philips Arena; 17,752	20–5
26	December 14	Utah	W 118–81	Kawhi Leonard (22)	LaMarcus Aldridge (8)	Green, Parker (5)	AT&T Center; 18,418	21–5
27	December 16	Washington	W 114–95	Kawhi Leonard (27)	David West (10)	Tony Parker (10)	AT&T Center; 18,418	22–5
28	December 18	L. A. Clippers	W 115–107	LaMarcus Aldridge (26)	LaMarcus Aldridge (13)	Diaw, Ginobili (5)	AT&T Center; 18,418	23–5
29	December 21	Indiana	W 106–92	Kawhi Leonard (24)	LaMarcus Aldridge (9)	Kawhi Leonard (5)	AT&T Center; 18,418	24–5
30	December 23	@ Minnesota	W 108–83	Kawhi Leonard (19)	LaMarcus Aldridge (8)	Tony Parker (6)	Target Center; 16,788	25–5
31	December 25	@ Houston	L 84–88	Kawhi Leonard (20)	Tim Duncan (11)	Kawhi Leonard (4)	Toyota Center; 18,319	25–6
32	December 26	Denver	W 101–86	Kawhi Leonard (20)	LaMarcus Aldridge (9)	David West (6)	AT&T Center; 18,420	26–6
33	December 28	Minnesota	W 101–95	Marjanović, Leonard (17)	Kawhi Leonard (11)	Tony Parker (7)	AT&T Center; 18,493	27–6
34	December 30	Phoenix	W 112–79	LaMarcus Aldridge (21)	Aldridge, Marjanović (12)	Tony Parker (7)	AT&T Center; 18,418	28–6

January : 11–2 (home: 6–0; road: 5–2)

Game	Date	Team	Score	High points	High rebounds	High assists	Location Attendance	Record
35	January 2	Houston	W 121–103	LaMarcus Aldridge (24)	LaMarcus Aldridge (9)	Tony Parker (10)	AT&T Center; 18,652	29–6
36	January 4	@ Milwaukee	W 123–98	Kawhi Leonard (24)	LaMarcus Aldridge (11)	Manu Ginóbili (7)	BMO Harris Bradley Center; 14,718	30–6
37	January 6	Utah	W 123–98	Tim Duncan (18)	LaMarcus Aldridge (13)	Duncan, Diaw (6)	AT&T Center; 18,418	31–6
38	January 8	New York	W 100–99	Kawhi Leonard (19)	Kawhi Leonard (12)	Tony Parker (8)	AT&T Center; 18,420	32–6
39	January 11	@ Brooklyn	W 106–79	LaMarcus Aldridge (25)	LaMarcus Aldridge (11)	Manu Ginóbili (5)	Barclays Center; 15,214	33–6
40	January 12	@ Detroit	W 109–99	Tony Parker (31)	LaMarcus Aldridge (13)	Danny Green (5)	Palace of Auburn Hills; 14,273	34–6
41	January 14	Cleveland	W 99–95	Tony Parker (24)	Kawhi Leonard (10)	Kawhi Leonard (5)	AT&T Center; 18,418	35–6
42	January 17	Dallas	W 112–83	LaMarcus Aldridge (23)	Aldridge, Green (7)	Tony Parker (7)	AT&T Center; 18,418	36–6
43	January 21	@ Phoenix	W 117–89	Kawhi Leonard (21)	Boban Marjanović (13)	Boris Diaw (4)	Talking Stick Resort Arena; 16,779	37–6
44	January 22	@ L. A. Lakers	W 108–95	Manu Ginóbili (20)	David West (7)	Diaw, Ginobili (4)	Staples Center; 18,997	38–6
45	January 25	@ Golden State	L 90–120	Kawhi Leonard (16)	Boban Marjanović (6)	Ginobili, Green, Parker (3)	Oracle Arena; 19,596	38–7
46	January 27	Houston	W 130–99	LaMarcus Aldridge (25)	Aldridge, Marjanović (10)	Tony Parker (7)	AT&T Center; 18,418	39–7
47	January 30	@ Cleveland	L 103–117	Kawhi Leonard (24)	Kawhi Leonard (6)	Tony Parker (6)	Quicken Loans Arena; 20,562	39–8

February : 11–1 (home: 3–0; road: 8–1)

Game	Date	Team	Score	High points	High rebounds	High assists	Location Attendance	Record
48	February 1	Orlando	W 107–92	LaMarcus Aldridge (28)	Diaw, Green (6)	Tony Parker (6)	AT&T Center; 18,418	40–8
49	February 3	New Orleans	W 110–97	LaMarcus Aldridge (36)	Danny Green (7)	Tony Parker (8)	AT&T Center; 18,418	41–8
50	February 5	@ Dallas	W 116–90	Kawhi Leonard (23)	LaMarcus Aldridge (10)	Boris Diaw (4)	American Airlines Center; 20,404	42–8
51	February 6	L. A. Lakers	W 106–102	LaMarcus Aldridge (26)	Kawhi Leonard (13)	David West (5)	AT&T Center; 18,418	43–8
52	February 9	@ Miami	W 119–101	LaMarcus Aldridge (28)	Kawhi Leonard (9)	Tony Parker (5)	American Airlines Arena; 19,723	44–8
53	February 10	@ Orlando	W 98–96	Kawhi Leonard (29)	Aldridge, Duncan, Leonard (7)	Patty Mills (7)	Amway Center; 17,467	45–8
All-Star Break
54	February 18	@ L. A. Clippers	L 86–105	Tony Parker (14)	Tim Duncan (6)	Tony Parker, West (4)	Staples Center; 19,410	45–9
55	February 19	@ L. A. Lakers	W 119–113	Tony Parker (25)	Tim Duncan (13)	Tony Parker (9)	Staples Center; 18,997	46–9
56	February 21	@ Phoenix	W 118–111	Tony Parker (22)	LaMarcus Aldridge (10)	Patty Mills (5)	Talking Stick Resort Arena; 16,224	47–9
57	February 24	@ Sacramento	W 108–92	Tony Parker (19)	LaMarcus Aldridge (9)	Tony Parker (6)	Sleep Train Arena; 17,317	48–9
58	February 25	@ Utah	W 96–78	Kawhi Leonard (29)	Tim Duncan (11)	Tony Parker (6)	Vivint Smart Home Arena; 19,911	49–9
59	February 27	@ Houston	W 104–94	Kawhi Leonard (27)	LaMarcus Aldridge (16)	Tim Duncan (6)	Toyota Center; 18,240	50–9

March : 13–3 (home: 10–0; road: 3–3)

Game	Date	Team	Score	High points	High rebounds	High assists	Location Attendance	Record
60	March 2	Detroit	W 97–81	Kawhi Leonard (27)	LaMarcus Aldridge (10)	Patty Mills (7)	AT&T Center; 18,418	51–9
61	March 3	@ New Orleans	W 94–86	Kawhi Leonard (30)	Kawhi Leonard (11)	Patty Mills (8)	Smoothie King Center; 17,781	52–9
62	March 5	Sacramento	W 104–94	Kawhi Leonard (25)	Kawhi Leonard (13)	Tony Parker (7)	AT&T Center; 18,418	53–9
63	March 7	@ Indiana	L 91–99	Aldridge, Leonard (23)	Tim Duncan (14)	Tony Parker (5)	Bankers Life Fieldhouse; 16,742	53–10
64	March 8	@ Minnesota	W 116–91	LaMarcus Aldridge (29)	Boban Marjanović (8)	Andre Miller (5)	Target Center; 14,093	54–10
65	March 10	Chicago	W 109–101	Kawhi Leonard (29)	LaMarcus Aldridge (10)	Tony Parker (12)	AT&T Center; 18,418	55–10
66	March 12	Oklahoma City	W 93–85	Kawhi Leonard (26)	LaMarcus Aldridge (9)	Tony Parker (4)	AT&T Center; 18,418	56–10
67	March 15	L. A. Clippers	W 108–87	Kawhi Leonard (20)	Tim Duncan (7)	Patty Mills (6)	AT&T Center; 18,418	57–10
68	March 17	Portland	W 118–110	Aldridge, Leonard (22)	Tim Duncan (7)	Tony Parker (16)	AT&T Center; 18,418	58–10
69	March 19	Golden State	W 87–79	Kawhi Leonard (26)	LaMarcus Aldridge (14)	Tony Parker (6)	AT&T Center; 18,825	59–10
70	March 21	@ Charlotte	L 88–91	Tony Parker (19)	LaMarcus Aldridge (12)	Tony Parker (7)	Time Warner Cable Arena; 18,260	59–11
71	March 23	Miami	W 112–88	Kawhi Leonard (32)	Tim Duncan (9)	Tony Parker (5)	AT&T Center; 18,418	60–11
72	March 25	Memphis	W 110–104	LaMarcus Aldridge (32)	LaMarcus Aldridge (12)	Tim Duncan (7)	AT&T Center; 18,418	61–11
73	March 26	@ Oklahoma City	L 92–111	David West (17)	Andre Miller (8)	David West (3)	Chesapeake Energy Arena; 18,203	61–12
74	March 28	@ Memphis	W 101–87	LaMarcus Aldridge (31)	LaMarcus Aldridge (13)	Kyle Anderson (7)	FedExForum; 17,133	62–12
75	March 30	New Orleans	W 100–92	Manu Ginóbili (20)	Tim Duncan (9)	Tony Parker (6)	AT&T Center; 18,418	63–12

April : 4–3 (home: 2–1; road: 2–2)

Game	Date	Team	Score	High points	High rebounds	High assists	Location Attendance	Record
76	April 2	Toronto	W 102–95	Kawhi Leonard (33)	LaMarcus Aldridge (15)	Kawhi Leonard (7)	AT&T Center; 18,418	64–12
77	April 5	@ Utah	W 88–86	Kawhi Leonard (18)	Kawhi Leonard (8)	Tony Parker (6)	Vivint Smart Home Arena; 19,381	65–12
78	April 7	@ Golden State	L 101–112	Kawhi Leonard (23)	Kyle Anderson (11)	David West (7)	Oracle Arena; 19,596	65–13
79	April 8	@ Denver	L 98–102	Tim Duncan (21)	Duncan, West (7)	Kevin Martin (7)	Pepsi Center; 16,347	65–14
80	April 10	Golden State	L 86–92	LaMarcus Aldridge (24)	Kawhi Leonard (13)	Kawhi Leonard (5)	AT&T Center; 18,658	65–15
81	April 12	Oklahoma City	W 102–98 (OT)	Kawhi Leonard (26)	Tim Duncan (9)	Kawhi Leonard (5)	AT&T Center; 18,765	66–15
82	April 13	@ Dallas	W 96–91	Boban Marjanović (22)	Boban Marjanović (12)	Boris Diaw (7)	American Airlines Center; 20,346	67–15

2015–16 season schedule

== Playoffs ==
=== Game log ===
2016 playoff game log
Total: 6–4 (home: 3–2; road: 3–2)
First Round: 4–0 (home: 2–0; road: 2–0)

Game	Date	Team	Score	High points	High rebounds	High assists	Location Attendance	Series
1	April 17	Memphis	W 106–74	Kawhi Leonard (20)	Tim Duncan (11)	Tony Parker (6)	AT&T Center; 18,418	1–0
2	April 19	Memphis	W 94–68	Patty Mills (16)	Tim Duncan (9)	Duncan, Parker (4)	AT&T Center; 18,418	2–0
3	April 22	@ Memphis	W 96–87	Kawhi Leonard (32)	LaMarcus Aldridge (10)	Tony Parker (7)	FedExForum; 18,119	3–0
4	April 24	@ Memphis	W 116–95	Kawhi Leonard (21)	LaMarcus Aldridge (10)	Kawhi Leonard (4)	FedExForum; 18,119	4–0

Conference Semifinals: 2–4 (home: 1–2; road: 1–2)

Game	Date	Team	Score	High points	High rebounds	High assists	Location Attendance	Series
1	April 30	Oklahoma City	W 124–92	LaMarcus Aldridge (38)	Kyle Anderson (7)	Tony Parker (12)	AT&T Center; 18,418	1–0
2	May 2	Oklahoma City	L 97–98	LaMarcus Aldridge (41)	Tim Duncan (9)	Tony Parker (6)	AT&T Center; 18,418	1–1
3	May 6	@ Oklahoma City	W 100–96	Kawhi Leonard (31)	Kawhi Leonard (11)	Tony Parker (5)	Chesapeake Energy Arena; 18,203	2–1
4	May 8	@ Oklahoma City	L 97–111	Tony Parker (22)	David West (7)	Mills, Parker (3)	Chesapeake Energy Arena; 18,203	2–2
5	May 10	Oklahoma City	L 91–95	Kawhi Leonard (26)	LaMarcus Aldridge (9)	Tony Parker (5)	AT&T Center; 18,418	2–3
6	May 12	@ Oklahoma City	L 99–113	Kawhi Leonard (22)	LaMarcus Aldridge (14)	Kawhi Leonard (5)	Chesapeake Energy Arena; 18,203	2–4

2016 playoff schedule

== Player statistics ==
Legend
GP	Games played	GS	Games started	MPG	Minutes per game
FG%	Field goal percentage	3P%	3-point field goal percentage	FT%	Free throw percentage
RPG	Rebounds per game	APG	Assists per game	SPG	Steals per game
BPG	Blocks per game	PPG	Points per game	**Bold**	Career high

=== Regular season ===
Player	GP	GS	MPG	FG%	3P%	FT%	RPG	APG	SPG	BPG	PPG
LaMarcus Aldridge	74	74	30.6	.513	.000	.858	8.5	1.5	.5	1.1	18.0
Kyle Anderson	78	11	16.0	.468	.324	.747	3.1	1.6	.8	.4	4.5
Matt Bonner	30	2	6.9	.509	.441	.750	.9	.3	.2	.0	2.5
Rasual Butler	46	0	9.4	.471	.306	.688	1.2	.5	.3	.5	2.7
Boris Diaw	76	4	18.2	.527	.362	.737	3.1	2.3	.3	.3	6.4
Tim Duncan	61	60	25.2	.488	.000	.702	7.3	2.7	.8	1.3	8.6
Manu Ginóbili	58	0	19.6	.453	.391	.813	2.5	3.1	1.1	.2	9.6
Danny Green	79	79	26.1	.376	.332	.739	3.8	1.8	1.0	.8	7.2
Kawhi Leonard	72	72	33.1	.506	.443	.874	6.8	2.6	1.8	1.0	21.2
Boban Marjanovic	54	4	9.4	.603	.	.763	3.6	.4	.2	.4	5.5
Kevin Martin	16	1	16.3	.353	.333	.933	1.8	.8	.6	.1	6.2
Ray McCallum	31	3	8.3	.403	.313	.900	1.0	1.1	.2	.1	2.2
Andre Miller	13	4	13.9	.479	.250	.692	2.1	2.2	.5	.0	4.3
Patty Mills	81	3	20.5	.425	.384	.810	2.0	2.8	.7	.1	8.5
Tony Parker	72	72	27.5	.493	.415	.760	2.4	5.3	.8	.2	11.9
Jonathon Simmons	55	2	14.8	.504	.383	.750	1.7	1.1	.4	.1	6.0
David West	78	19	18.0	.545	.429	.788	4.0	1.8	.6	.7	7.1

=== Playoffs ===
Player	GP	GS	MPG	FG%	3P%	FT%	RPG	APG	SPG	BPG	PPG
LaMarcus Aldridge	10	10	33.7	.521	1.000	.891	8.3	1.0	.4	1.4	21.9
Kyle Anderson	10	0	12.9	.320	.333	.857	2.4	.7	.6	.3	2.3
Boris Diaw	9	0	17.7	.457	.333	.750	2.1	2.3	.2	.4	5.2
Tim Duncan	10	10	21.8	.423	.	.714	4.8	1.4	.2	1.3	5.9
Manu Ginóbili	10	0	19.2	.426	.429	.783	2.7	2.5	.8	.3	6.7
Danny Green	10	10	26.7	.462	.500	.667	3.1	.7	2.1	.8	8.6
Kawhi Leonard	10	10	33.9	.500	.436	.824	6.3	2.8	2.6	1.4	22.5
Boban Marjanovic	7	0	6.0	.667	.	.889	2.0	.4	.0	.3	3.4
Kevin Martin	5	0	9.8	.400	.500	.667	.8	.6	.2	.0	4.4
Andre Miller	5	0	7.0	.429	.333	1.000	1.0	1.4	.0	.0	1.8
Patty Mills	10	0	16.7	.434	.361	.636	1.4	2.0	.7	.0	6.6
Tony Parker	10	10	26.4	.449	.250	.857	2.2	5.3	.6	.2	10.4
Jonathon Simmons	3	0	8.7	.400	.667	.500	1.3	.7	.7	.0	3.7
David West	10	0	17.6	.455	.500	.556	3.7	1.3	.6	.7	5.8

== Transactions ==
=== Trades ===
July 9, 2015	To San Antonio Spurs Ray McCallum, Jr.	To Sacramento Kings 2016 Second Round Draft Pick
July 9, 2015	To San Antonio Spurs Georgios Printezis Draft Rights 2017 Draft Second Round Pick	To Atlanta Hawks Tiago Splitter

=== Free agents ===
==== Re-signed ====
Player	Signed
Tim Duncan	Signed 2-year contract worth $10.4 million
Danny Green	Signed 4-year contract worth $45 million
Matt Bonner	Signed 1-year contract worth $1.5 million
Kawhi Leonard	Signed 5-year contract worth $90 million
Manu Ginóbili	Signed 2-year contract worth $5.8 million

==== Additions ====
Player	Signed	Former team
LaMarcus Aldridge	Signed 4-year contract worth $80 million	Portland Trail Blazers
Boban Marjanović	Signed 1-year contract worth $1.2 million	(Serbia) Crvena Zvezda Telekom Belgrade
David West	Signed 2-year contract worth $3 million	Indiana Pacers
Jonathon Simmons	Signed 1-year contract worth $525K	Austin Spurs

==== Subtractions ====
Player	Reason left	New team
Aron Baynes	Signed 3-year contract worth $19.5 million	Detroit Pistons
Marco Belinelli	Signed 3-year contract worth $19 million	Sacramento Kings
Cory Joseph	Signed 4-year contract worth $30 million	Toronto Raptors
Jeff Ayres	Unrestricted Free Agent / Waived	Idaho Stampede (NBA D-League)
