= 2015–16 Minnesota Timberwolves season =

NBA professional basketball team season

- Head coach: Sam Mitchell
- General manager: Milt Newton
- Owners: Glen Taylor
- Arena: Target Center

Results
- Record: 29–53 (.354)
- Place: Division: 5th (Northwest); Conference: 13th (Western)
- Playoff finish: Did not qualify
- Stats at Basketball Reference

Local media
- Television: Fox Sports North
- Radio: WCCO

The 2015–16 Minnesota Timberwolves season was the 27th season of the franchise in the National Basketball Association (NBA). Before the season, the Timberwolves announced that head coach and team president Flip Saunders will not coach the team this season as he continued his battle with cancer. Sam Mitchell was named interim head coach. On October 25, 2015, Saunders died and the Wolves announced that Mitchell as the interim coach for the rest of the season. Around the start of the season, the Timberwolves were the first team in NBA history with four players that were around 20 or younger, between Andrew Wiggins, Zach LaVine, Karl-Anthony Towns, and Tyus Jones to start out a season.^{[a]}

It also marked the final season of Kevin Garnett's career in the NBA and his first time since 2006-07 playing with the Timberwolves. Playing 21 years in the league, Garnett previously played for the Wolves from 1995 to 2007 until being traded to the Boston Celtics, where he won a championship with them in 2008. Prior to his second stint with the Wolves, Garnett played two disappointing seasons with the Brooklyn Nets, one of them with fellow Celtics Paul Pierce and Jason Terry. Garnett is believed by many as the greatest Timberwolf of all time. He was also the last remaining active player from the 1995 NBA draft.

The Timberwolves missed the playoffs for the 12th consecutive season, equalling the second-longest postseason appearance drought in NBA history of the Golden State Warriors between 1994–95 and 2005–06, only behind the Los Angeles Clippers^{[b]} between 1976–77 and 1990–91. However, the Timberwolves had their second straight Rookie of the Year winner with #1 pick Karl-Anthony Towns earning the award.

== Draft ==
Round	Pick	Player	Position	Nationality	College / Club
1	1	Karl-Anthony Towns	C	Dominican Republic	Kentucky
2	31	Cedi Osman	SF	Turkey	Anadolu Efes
2	36	Rakeem Christmas	PF / C	United States	Syracuse

The Timberwolves entered the draft with one first-round selection and one second-round selection. After finishing the previous season with the worst record in the league, the team was awarded the first overall selection following the NBA draft lottery and used that pick to draft future All-Star Karl-Anthony Towns.

== Roster ==
2015–16 Minnesota Timberwolves roster
Players

Pos.	No.	Player	Height	Weight	DOB	From
PF	88	Nemanja Bjelica	6 ft 10 in (2.08 m)	240 lb (109 kg)	1988–05–09	Serbia
PF	21	Kevin Garnett	6 ft 11 in (2.11 m)	253 lb (115 kg)	1976–05–19	Farragut Academy (IL)
C	5	Gorgui Dieng	6 ft 11 in (2.11 m)	245 lb (111 kg)	1990–01–18	Louisville
PG	1	Tyus Jones	6 ft 2 in (1.88 m)	195 lb (88 kg)	1996–05–10	Duke
SG	8	Zach LaVine	6 ft 6 in (1.98 m)	189 lb (86 kg)	1995–03–10	UCLA
SG	15	Shabazz Muhammad	6 ft 6 in (1.98 m)	223 lb (101 kg)	1992–11–13	UCLA
PF	33	Adreian Payne	6 ft 10 in (2.08 m)	237 lb (108 kg)	1991–02–19	Michigan State
C	14	Nikola Peković	6 ft 11 in (2.11 m)	307 lb (139 kg)	1986–01–03	Montenegro
SF	12	Tayshaun Prince	6 ft 9 in (2.06 m)	212 lb (96 kg)	1980–02–28	Kentucky
PG	9	Ricky Rubio	6 ft 4 in (1.93 m)	194 lb (88 kg)	1990–10–21	Spain
SF	10	Damjan Rudež	6 ft 10 in (2.08 m)	228 lb (103 kg)	1986–06–17	Croatia
PF	4	Greg Smith	6 ft 10 in (2.08 m)	250 lb (113 kg)	1991–01–08	Fresno State
C	32	Karl-Anthony Towns	7 ft 0 in (2.13 m)	250 lb (113 kg)	1995–11–15	Dominican Republic
SG	22	Andrew Wiggins	6 ft 8 in (2.03 m)	200 lb (91 kg)	1995–02–23	Kansas

Coaches
Head coach
- Sam Mitchell
Assistant(s)
- David Adelman
- Bryan Gates
- Sidney Lowe
- Ryan Saunders

Legend
- (DP) Unsigned draft pick
- (FA) Free agent
- (S) Suspended
- (DL) On assignment to D-League affiliate
- Injured

Roster
Updated: 2016–04–13

== Pre-season ==
2015 pre-season game log
Total: 2–5 (Home: 2–2; Road: 0–3)
Pre-season: 2–5 (home: 2–2; road: 0–3)

Game	Date	Team	Score	High points	High rebounds	High assists	Location Attendance	Record
1	October 7	Oklahoma City	99–122	Dieng, Towns (18)	Bjelica, Towns (5)	Tyus Jones (4)	Target Center; 8,601	0–1
2	October 10	Chicago	105–114	Tyus Jones (18)	Karl-Anthony Towns (10)	Tyus Jones (9)	MTS Centre; 15,294	0–2
3	October 12	@ Toronto	105–112	Andrew Wiggins (21)	Dieng, Payne, Towns (6)	Lorenzo Brown (5)	Air Canada Centre; 19,277	0–3
4	October 14	Toronto	89–87	Gorgui Dieng (14)	Nemanja Bjelica (6)	Zach LaVine (5)	Canadian Tire Centre; 15,522	1–3
5	October 18	@ Memphis	68–90	Zach LaVine (12)	Dieng, Towns (7)	Ricky Rubio (4)	FedExForum; 13,387	1–4
6	October 20	@ Milwaukee	88–106	Shabazz Muhammad (18)	Nemanja Bjelica (7)	Garnett, Muhammad, Martin (4)	Kohl Center; 12,381	1–5
7	October 23	Milwaukee	112–108	Andrew Wiggins (24)	Karl-Anthony Towns (12)	Ricky Rubio (6)	Target Center; 10,101	2–5

2015–16 season schedule

== Regular season ==
=== Standings ===
==== Conference ====
Western Conference
#	Team	W	L	PCT	GB	GP
1	z – Golden State Warriors *	73	9	.890	–	82
2	y – San Antonio Spurs *	67	15	.817	6.0	82
3	y – Oklahoma City Thunder *	55	27	.671	18.0	82
4	x – Los Angeles Clippers	53	29	.646	20.0	82
5	x – Portland Trail Blazers	44	38	.537	29.0	82
6	x – Dallas Mavericks	42	40	.512	31.0	82
7	x – Memphis Grizzlies	42	40	.512	31.0	82
8	x – Houston Rockets	41	41	.500	32.0	82
9	e – Utah Jazz	40	42	.488	33.0	82
10	e – Sacramento Kings	33	49	.402	40.0	82
11	e – Denver Nuggets	33	49	.402	40.0	82
12	e – New Orleans Pelicans	30	52	.366	43.0	82
13	e – Minnesota Timberwolves	29	53	.354	44.0	82
14	e – Phoenix Suns	23	59	.280	50.0	82
15	e – Los Angeles Lakers	17	65	.207	56.0	82

==== Division ====
Northwest Division	W	L	PCT	GB	Home	Road	Div	GP
y – Oklahoma City Thunder	55	27	.671	–	32‍–‍9	23‍–‍18	13–3	82
x – Portland Trail Blazers	44	38	.537	11.0	28‍–‍13	16‍–‍25	11–5	82
e – Utah Jazz	40	42	.488	15.0	24‍–‍17	16‍–‍25	8–8	82
e – Denver Nuggets	33	49	.402	22.0	18‍–‍23	15‍–‍26	4–12	82
e – Minnesota Timberwolves	29	53	.354	26.0	14‍–‍27	15‍–‍26	4–12	82

== Regular season game log ==
2015–16 game log
Total: 29–53 (Home: 14–27; Road: 15–26)
October: 2–0 (home: 0–0; road: 2–0)

Game	Date	Team	Score	High points	High rebounds	High assists	Location Attendance	Record
1	October 28	@ L. A. Lakers	W 112–111	Ricky Rubio (28)	Karl-Anthony Towns (12)	Ricky Rubio (14)	Staples Center; 18,997	1–0
2	October 30	@ Denver	W 95–78	Karl-Anthony Towns (28)	Karl-Anthony Towns (14)	Ricky Rubio (8)	Pepsi Center; 17,660	2–0

November : 6–9 (home: 2–6; road: 4–3)

Game	Date	Team	Score	High points	High rebounds	High assists	Location Attendance	Record
3	November 2	Portland	L 101–106	Kevin Martin (24)	Bjelica, Rubio (9)	Ricky Rubio (9)	Target Center; 18,903	2–1
4	November 5	Miami	L 84–96	Martin, Muhammad (14)	Nemanja Bjelica (7)	Ricky Rubio (5)	Target Center; 11,794	2–2
5	November 7	@ Chicago	W 102–93 (OT)	Andrew Wiggins (31)	Karl-Anthony Towns (13)	Ricky Rubio (10)	United Center; 21,988	3–2
6	November 9	@ Atlanta	W 117–107	Andrew Wiggins (33)	Karl-Anthony Towns (12)	Ricky Rubio (8)	Philips Arena; 12,016	4–2
7	November 10	Charlotte	L 95–104	Zach LaVine (20)	Karl-Anthony Towns (13)	Zach LaVine (8)	Target Center; 14,722	4–3
8	November 12	Golden State	L 116–129	Andrew Wiggins (19)	Karl-Anthony Towns (11)	Kevin Martin (6)	Target Center; 16,130	4–4
9	November 13	@ Indiana	L 103–107	LaVine, Wiggins (26)	Karl-Anthony Towns (9)	Andre Miller (5)	Bankers Life Fieldhouse; 16,797	4–5
10	November 15	Memphis	L 106–114	Zach LaVine (25)	Karl-Anthony Towns (9)	Andre Miller (8)	Target Center; 12,086	4–6
11	November 17	@ Miami	W 103–91	Andrew Wiggins (24)	Karl-Anthony Towns (14)	LaVine, Rubio (3)	American Airlines Arena; 19,600	5–6
12	November 18	@ Orlando	L 101–104 (OT)	Andrew Wiggins (28)	Ricky Rubio (12)	Ricky Rubio (12)	Amway Center; 16,048	5–7
13	November 20	Detroit	L 86–96	Andrew Wiggins (21)	Martin, Towns (7)	Ricky Rubio (7)	Target Center; 13,445	5–8
14	November 23	Philadelphia	W 100–95	Andrew Wiggins (30)	Kevin Garnett (10)	Ricky Rubio (11)	Target Center; 11,382	6–8
15	November 25	Atlanta	W 99–95	Zach LaVine (18)	Gorgui Dieng (11)	Rubio, LaVine (6)	Target Center; 14,289	7–8
16	November 27	@ Sacramento	W 101–91	Andrew Wiggins (22)	Dieng, LaVine, Towns (8)	Garnett, LaVine, Miller (4)	Sleep Train Arena; 17,317	8–8
17	November 29	@ L. A. Clippers	L 99–107	Andrew Wiggins (21)	Gorgui Dieng (10)	Zach LaVine (7)	STAPLES Center; 19,060	8–9

December : 4–12 (home: 3–6; road: 1–6)

Game	Date	Team	Score	High points	High rebounds	High assists	Location Attendance	Record
18	December 1	Orlando	L 93–96	Andrew Wiggins (27)	Bjelica, Garnett (8)	Zach LaVine (5)	Target Center; 10,694	8–10
19	December 5	Portland	L 103–109	Karl-Anthony Towns (27)	Karl-Anthony Towns (12)	Ricky Rubio (15)	Target Center; 16,203	8–11
20	December 7	L. A. Clippers	L 106–110	Zach LaVine (21)	Shabazz Muhammad (9)	Ricky Rubio (7)	Target Center; 11,467	8–12
21	December 9	L. A. Lakers	W 123–122 (OT)	Kevin Martin (37)	Karl-Anthony Towns (14)	Ricky Rubio (12)	Target Center; 18,076	9–12
22	December 11	@ Denver	L 108–111 (OT)	Martin, Wiggins (22)	Karl-Anthony Towns (9)	Ricky Rubio (7)	Pepsi Center; 12,533	9–13
23	December 13	@ Phoenix	L 101–108	Zach LaVine (28)	Bjelica, Towns (6)	Ricky Rubio (7)	Talking Stick Resort Arena; 16,919	9–14
24	December 15	Denver	L 100–112	Andrew Wiggins (23)	Gorgui Dieng (9)	Ricky Rubio (9)	Target Center; 11,323	9–15
25	December 16	@ New York	L 102–107	Karl-Anthony Towns (25)	Dieng, Rubio, Towns (10)	Ricky Rubio (12)	Madison Square Garden; 19,812	9–16
26	December 18	Sacramento	W 99–95	Andrew Wiggins (32)	Gorgui Dieng (11)	Ricky Rubio (8)	Target Center; 12,770	10–16
27	December 20	@ Brooklyn	W 100–85	Karl-Anthony Towns (24)	Karl-Anthony Towns (10)	Ricky Rubio (12)	Barclays Center; 14,552	11–16
28	December 21	@ Boston	L 99–113	Andrew Wiggins (26)	Karl-Anthony Towns (16)	Ricky Rubio (8)	TD Garden; 18,624	11–17
29	December 23	San Antonio	L 83–108	Zach LaVine (17)	Karl-Anthony Towns (11)	LaVine, Rubio (4)	Target Center; 16,788	11–18
30	December 26	Indiana	L 88–102	Karl-Anthony Towns (24)	Karl-Anthony Towns (8)	Ricky Rubio (9)	Target Center; 15,076	11–19
31	December 28	@ San Antonio	L 95–101	Andrew Wiggins (18)	Karl-Anthony Towns (12)	Ricky Rubio (14)	AT&T Center; 18,493	11–20
32	December 30	Utah	W 94–80	Karl-Anthony Towns (25)	Karl-Anthony Towns (10)	Ricky Rubio (17)	Target Center; 14,326	12–20
33	December 31	@ Detroit	L 90–115	Karl-Anthony Towns (22)	Karl-Anthony Towns (9)	Ricky Rubio (8)	Palace of Auburn Hills; 15,475	12–21

January : 2–14 (home: 2–6; road: 0–8)

Game	Date	Team	Score	High points	High rebounds	High assists	Location Attendance	Record
34	January 2	Milwaukee	L 85–95	Andrew Wiggins (19)	Karl-Anthony Towns (10)	Ricky Rubio (7)	Target Center; 14,107	12–22
35	January 4	@ Philadelphia	L 99–109	Shabazz Muhammad (20)	Gorgui Dieng (8)	Ricky Rubio (10)	Wells Fargo Center; 14,013	12–23
36	January 6	Denver	L 74–78	Karl-Anthony Towns (14)	Karl-Anthony Towns (14)	Ricky Rubio (7)	Target Center; 12,059	12–24
37	January 8	Cleveland	L 99–125	Andrew Wiggins (35)	Dieng, Towns (6)	Ricky Rubio (6)	Target Center; 16,768	12–25
38	January 10	Dallas	L 87–93	Andrew Wiggins (21)	Dieng, Rubio, Wiggins (6)	Ricky Rubio (8)	Target Center; 14,363	12–26
39	January 12	Oklahoma City	L 96–101	Andrew Wiggins (22)	Karl-Anthony Towns (10)	Ricky Rubio (6)	Target Center; 14,791	12–27
40	January 13	@ Houston	L 104–107	Andrew Wiggins (28)	Karl-Anthony Towns (16)	Ricky Rubio (12)	Toyota Center; 17,115	12–28
41	January 15	@ Oklahoma City	L 93–113	Andrew Wiggins (25)	Karl-Anthony Towns (12)	Nemanja Bjelica (4)	Chesapeake Energy Arena; 18,203	12–29
42	January 17	Phoenix	W 117–87	Rubio, Wiggins (18)	Muhammad, Towns (8)	Andrew Wiggins (4)	Target Center; 14,330	13–29
43	January 19	@ New Orleans	L 99–114	Andrew Wiggins (25)	Karl-Anthony Towns (13)	LaVine, Rubio (4)	Smoothie King Center; 14,255	13–30
44	January 20	@ Dallas	L 94–106 (OT)	Karl-Anthony Towns (27)	Karl-Anthony Towns (17)	Ricky Rubio (11)	American Airlines Center; 19,621	13–31
45	January 23	Memphis	W 106–101	Shabazz Muhammad (25)	Karl-Anthony Towns (9)	Ricky Rubio (12)	Target Center; 15,608	14–31
46	January 25	@ Cleveland	L 107–114	Karl-Anthony Towns (26)	Karl-Anthony Towns (11)	Ricky Rubio (10)	Quicken Loans Arena; 20,562	14–32
47	January 27	Oklahoma City	L 123–126	Zach LaVine (35)	Karl-Anthony Towns (13)	Ricky Rubio (10)	Target Center; 13,337	14–33
48	January 29	@ Utah	L 90–103	Karl-Anthony Towns (32)	Gorgui Dieng (15)	Ricky Rubio (8)	Vivint Smart Home Arena; 18,850	14–34
49	January 31	@ Portland	L 93–96	Karl-Anthony Towns (21)	Karl-Anthony Towns (13)	Ricky Rubio (9)	Moda Center; 19,393	14–35

February : 5–6 (home: 3–2; road: 2–4)

Game	Date	Team	Score	High points	High rebounds	High assists	Location Attendance	Record
50	February 2	@ L. A. Lakers	L 115–119	Andrew Wiggins (30)	Karl-Anthony Towns (9)	Ricky Rubio (15)	Staples Center; 18,997	14–36
51	February 3	@ L. A. Clippers	W 108–102	Andrew Wiggins (31)	Karl-Anthony Towns (12)	Ricky Rubio (7)	Staples Center; 19,060	15–36
52	February 6	Chicago	W 112–105	Karl-Anthony Towns (26)	Karl-Anthony Towns (17)	Gorgui Dieng (7)	Target Center; 17,876	16–36
53	February 8	New Orleans	L 102–116	Karl-Anthony Towns (17)	Dieng, Towns (12)	Ricky Rubio (7)	Target Center; 11,926	16–37
54	February 10	Toronto	W 107–102	Karl-Anthony Towns (35)	Karl-Anthony Towns (11)	Ricky Rubio (8)	Target Center; 11,171	17–37
All-Star Break
55	February 19	@ Memphis	L 104–109	Zach LaVine (22)	Karl-Anthony Towns (15)	Ricky Rubio (9)	FedExForum; 18,119	17–38
56	February 20	New York	L 95–103	Karl-Anthony Towns (24)	Karl-Anthony Towns (8)	Ricky Rubio (16)	Target Center; 16,663	17–39
57	February 22	Boston	W 124–122	Karl-Anthony Towns (28)	Karl-Anthony Towns (13)	Ricky Rubio (8)	Target Center; 11,639	18–39
58	February 24	@ Toronto	L 105–114	Andrew Wiggins (26)	Karl-Anthony Towns (8)	Ricky Rubio (12)	Air Canada Centre; 19,800	18–40
59	February 27	@ New Orleans	W 112–110	Karl-Anthony Towns (30)	Karl-Anthony Towns (15)	Ricky Rubio (10)	Smoothie King Center; 17,338	19–40
60	February 28	@ Dallas	L 101–128	Shabazz Muhammad (24)	Karl-Anthony Towns (11)	Tyus Jones (6)	American Airlines Center; 20,289	19–41

March : 6–9 (home: 3–5; road: 3–4)

Game	Date	Team	Score	High points	High rebounds	High assists	Location Attendance	Record
61	March 2	Washington	L 98–104	Ricky Rubio (22)	Karl-Anthony Towns (15)	Dieng, Towns (5)	Target Center; 11,307	19–42
62	March 4	@ Milwaukee	L 101–116	Karl-Anthony Towns (21)	Gorgui Dieng (9)	Ricky Rubio (7)	BMO Harris Bradley Center; 16,366	19–43
63	March 5	Brooklyn	W 132–118	Karl-Anthony Towns (28)	Ricky Rubio (7)	Ricky Rubio (10)	Target Center; 15,987	20–43
64	March 7	@ Charlotte	L 103–108	Karl-Anthony Towns (28)	Karl-Anthony Towns (14)	Ricky Rubio (10)	Time Warner Cable Arena; 15,912	20–44
65	March 8	San Antonio	L 91–116	Andrew Wiggins (23)	Karl-Anthony Towns (9)	Tyus Jones (6)	Target Center; 14,093	20–45
66	March 11	@ Oklahoma City	W 99–96	Gorgui Dieng (25)	Karl-Anthony Towns (12)	Ricky Rubio (12)	Chesapeake Energy Arena; 18,203	21–45
67	March 14	@ Phoenix	L 104–107	Zach LaVine (28)	Karl-Anthony Towns (10)	Ricky Rubio (17)	Talking Stick Resort Arena; 17,480	21–46
68	March 16	@ Memphis	W 114–108	Zach LaVine (28)	Karl-Anthony Towns (11)	Ricky Rubio (10)	FedExForum; 16,588	22–46
69	March 18	@ Houston	L 111–116	Karl-Anthony Towns (32)	Karl-Anthony Towns (11)	Ricky Rubio (6)	Toyota Center; 18,142	22–47
70	March 21	Golden State	L 104–109	Andrew Wiggins (25)	Karl-Anthony Towns (11)	Ricky Rubio (11)	Target Center; 19,452	22–48
71	March 23	Sacramento	W 113–104	Karl-Anthony Towns (26)	Gorgui Dieng (12)	Ricky Rubio (12)	Target Center; 12,151	23–48
72	March 25	@ Washington	W 132–129 (2OT)	Karl-Anthony Towns (27)	Karl-Anthony Towns (10)	Ricky Rubio (7)	Verizon Center; 20,356	24–48
73	March 26	Utah	L 84–93	Ricky Rubio (23)	Karl-Anthony Towns (11)	Ricky Rubio (6)	Target Center; 14,694	24–49
74	March 28	Phoenix	W 121–116	Andrew Wiggins (32)	Karl-Anthony Towns (10)	Ricky Rubio (11)	Target Center; 11,141	25–49
75	March 30	L. A. Clippers	L 79–99	Karl-Anthony Towns (16)	Karl-Anthony Towns (11)	Zach LaVine (4)	Target Center; 12,252	25–50

April : 4–3 (home: 1–2; road: 3–1)

Game	Date	Team	Score	High points	High rebounds	High assists	Location Attendance	Record
76	April 1	@ Utah	L 85–98	Andrew Wiggins (24)	Karl-Anthony Towns (11)	Ricky Rubio (9)	Vivint Smart Home Arena; 19,911	25–51
77	April 3	Dallas	L 78–88	Andrew Wiggins (30)	Karl-Anthony Towns (21)	Karl-Anthony Towns (9)	Target Center; 16,117	25–52
78	April 5	@ Golden State	W 124–117 (OT)	Shabazz Muhammad (35)	Karl-Anthony Towns (12)	Ricky Rubio (9)	Oracle Arena; 19,596	26–52
79	April 7	@ Sacramento	W 105–97	Nemanja Bjelica (18)	Gorgui Dieng (13)	Ricky Rubio (9)	Sleep Train Arena; 17,317	27–52
80	April 9	@ Portland	W 106–105	Karl-Anthony Towns (27)	Nemanja Bjelica (10)	Ricky Rubio (11)	Moda Center; 19,733	28–52
81	April 11	Houston	L 105–129	Shabazz Muhammad (23)	Nemanja Bjelica (6)	Jones, Rubio (5)	Target Center; 14,983	28–53
82	April 13	New Orleans	W 144–109	Karl-Anthony Towns (24)	Karl-Anthony Towns (12)	Ricky Rubio (10)	Target Center; 14,889	29–53

2015–16 season schedule

== Player statistics ==
=== Regular season ===
Player	POS	GP	GS	MP	REB	AST	STL	BLK	PTS	MPG	RPG	APG	SPG	BPG	PPG
Karl-Anthony Towns	C	82	82	2,627	858	161	58	138	1,503	32.0	10.5	2.0	.7	1.7	18.3
Gorgui Dieng	C	82	39	2,220	585	143	94	96	827	27.1	7.1	1.7	1.1	1.2	10.1
Zach LaVine	SG	82	33	2,294	228	251	69	17	1,150	28.0	2.8	3.1	.8	.2	14.0
Shabazz Muhammad	SF	82	0	1,682	267	52	24	7	863	20.5	3.3	.6	.3	.1	10.5
Andrew Wiggins	SF	81	81	2,845	291	164	78	46	1,675	35.1	3.6	2.0	1.0	.6	20.7
Tayshaun Prince	SF	77	44	1,462	147	73	36	13	221	19.0	1.9	.9	.5	.2	2.9
Ricky Rubio	PG	76	76	2,323	326	658	162	10	766	30.6	4.3	8.7	2.1	.1	10.1
Nemanja Bjelica	PF	60	0	1,075	210	83	26	21	308	17.9	3.5	1.4	.4	.4	5.1
Adreian Payne	PF	52	2	486	111	29	16	11	132	9.3	2.1	.6	.3	.2	2.5
Kevin Martin^{†}	SG	39	12	834	81	46	17	1	415	21.4	2.1	1.2	.4	.0	10.6
Kevin Garnett	PF	38	38	556	150	62	28	10	122	14.6	3.9	1.6	.7	.3	3.2
Tyus Jones	PG	37	0	573	47	108	31	3	156	15.5	1.3	2.9	.8	.1	4.2
Damjan Rudež	SF	33	0	277	20	11	3	1	75	8.4	.6	.3	.1	.0	2.3
Andre Miller^{†}	PG	26	0	280	24	58	9	0	88	10.8	.9	2.2	.3	.0	3.4
Greg Smith	PF	18	0	192	42	6	4	1	43	10.7	2.3	.3	.2	.1	2.4
Nikola Peković	C	12	3	156	21	11	1	0	54	13.0	1.8	.9	.1	.0	4.5

- ^{†} Denotes player spent time with another team in the season. Stats reflect time with the Timberwolves only.

== Transactions ==
=== Trades ===
July 12, 2015	To Minnesota Timberwolves Damjan Rudez	To Indiana Pacers Chase Budinger

=== Free agents ===
==== Re-signed ====
Player	Signed
Kevin Garnett	Signed 2-year contract worth $16.5 million

==== Additions ====
Player	Signed	Former Team
Nemanja Bjelica	Signed 3-year contract worth $12 million	(Turkey) Fenerbahçe Ülker
Andre Miller	Signed 1-year contract	Sacramento Kings
Tayshaun Prince	Signed 1-year contract worth $1.5 million	Detroit Pistons

==== Subtractions ====
Player	Reason Left	New Team
Gary Neal	Signed 1-year contract worth $2.1 million	Washington Wizards
Robbie Hummel	Signed 1-year contract	(Italy) Emporio Armani Milano

== Notes ==
^{a} That mark was shattered by the 2016-17 Phoenix Suns, who, in addition to holding four rookies between the ages of 18 and 20 to start out the season in Dragan Bender, Marquese Chriss, Tyler Ulis, and the undrafted Derrick Jones Jr., also held a second-year player named Devin Booker that played at the start of the season at age 19.
^{b} The team originally played in Buffalo, New York as the Buffalo Braves up to the end of the 1977–78 season and later played in San Diego as the San Diego Clippers between the 1978–79 and 1983–84 seasons inclusive before becoming the Los Angeles Clippers.
