= 2015–16 Dallas Mavericks season =

NBA professional basketball team season

- Head coach: Rick Carlisle
- President: Donnie Nelson
- General manager: Donnie Nelson
- Owner: Mark Cuban
- Arena: American Airlines Center

Results
- Record: 42–40 (.512)
- Place: Division: 2nd (Southwest); Conference: 6th (Western)
- Playoff finish: First Round (lost to Thunder 1–4)
- Stats at Basketball Reference

Local media
- Television: FS Southwest; KTXA
- Radio: KESN

The 2015–16 Dallas Mavericks season was the 36th season of the franchise in the National Basketball Association (NBA). The Mavericks finished second in the Southwest Division and sixth in the Western Conference with a 42–40 record. The Mavs' season ended with a 1–4 first round playoff series loss to the Oklahoma City Thunder.

The Mavericks would not qualify for the playoffs again until 2020. This season also marked the final career playoff appearance of Dirk Nowitzki until his retirement in 2019.

== Key dates ==
- June 25: The 2015 NBA draft took place at Barclays Center in Brooklyn, New York. The Mavericks selected Justin Anderson with the 21st overall pick in the draft.
- July 1: 2015 NBA free agency begins.

== Draft ==
Round	Pick	Player	Position	Nationality	School
1	21	Justin Anderson	SG/SF	United States	Virginia
2	52	Satnam Singh Bhamara	C	India	IMG Academy (HS Pg.)

== Standings ==
=== Conference ===
Western Conference
#	Team	W	L	PCT	GB	GP
1	z – Golden State Warriors *	73	9	.890	–	82
2	y – San Antonio Spurs *	67	15	.817	6.0	82
3	y – Oklahoma City Thunder *	55	27	.671	18.0	82
4	x – Los Angeles Clippers	53	29	.646	20.0	82
5	x – Portland Trail Blazers	44	38	.537	29.0	82
6	x – Dallas Mavericks	42	40	.512	31.0	82
7	x – Memphis Grizzlies	42	40	.512	31.0	82
8	x – Houston Rockets	41	41	.500	32.0	82
9	e – Utah Jazz	40	42	.488	33.0	82
10	e – Sacramento Kings	33	49	.402	40.0	82
11	e – Denver Nuggets	33	49	.402	40.0	82
12	e – New Orleans Pelicans	30	52	.366	43.0	82
13	e – Minnesota Timberwolves	29	53	.354	44.0	82
14	e – Phoenix Suns	23	59	.280	50.0	82
15	e – Los Angeles Lakers	17	65	.207	56.0	82

=== Division ===
Southwest Division	W	L	PCT	GB	Home	Road	Div	GP
y – San Antonio Spurs	67	15	.817	–	40‍–‍1	27‍–‍14	15–1	82
x – Dallas Mavericks	42	40	.512	25.0	23‍–‍18	19‍–‍22	7–9	82
x – Memphis Grizzlies	42	40	.512	25.0	26‍–‍15	16‍–‍25	7–9	82
x – Houston Rockets	41	41	.500	26.0	23‍–‍18	18‍–‍23	8–8	82
e – New Orleans Pelicans	30	52	.366	37.0	21‍–‍20	9‍–‍32	4–12	82

== Game log ==
=== Preseason ===
2015–16 game log
Total: 0–7
Pre-season: 0–7 (home: 0–3; road: 0–4)

Game	Date	Team	Score	High points	High rebounds	High assists	Location Attendance	Record
1	October 6	Denver	L 86–96	Charlie Villanueva (18)	Pachulia, Villanueva (8)	J.J. Barea (7)	American Airlines Center; 17,038	0–1
2	October 7	@ Houston	L 82–109	John Jenkins (19)	Samuel Dalembert (8)	Raymond Felton (6)	Toyota Center; 16,839	0–2
3	October 13	@ Oklahoma City	L 88–100	John Jenkins (26)	Jeremy Evans (8)	J.J. Barea (6)	BOK Center; 17,978	0–3
4	October 16	Atlanta	L 84–91	John Jenkins (16)	Salah Mejri (8)	J.J. Barea (7)	American Airlines Center; 19,315	0–4
5	October 19	@ Cleveland	L 97–103	John Jenkins (26)	Salah Mejri (8)	Raymond Felton (7)	Quicken Loans Arena; 18,768	0–5
6	October 21	Phoenix	L 87–99	John Jenkins (22)	Zaza Pachulia (12)	Felton, Wilson (3)	American Airlines Center; 18,247	0–6
7	October 23	@ Chicago	L 102–103	Dirk Nowitzki (19)	Dwight Powell (11)	J.J. Barea (6)	Pinnacle Bank Arena; 15,297	0–7

2015–16 season schedule

=== Regular season ===
2015–16 game log
Total: 42–40 (home: 23–18; road: 19–22)
October: 1–1 (home: 0–0; road: 1–1)

Game	Date	Team	Score	High points	High rebounds	High assists	Location Attendance	Record
1	October 28	@ Phoenix	W 111–95	Raymond Felton (18)	Zaza Pachulia (10)	Deron Williams (7)	US Airways Center; 18,055	1–0
2	October 29	@ L.A. Clippers	L 88–104	John Jenkins (17)	Pachulia, Powell (8)	J.J. Barea (9)	Staples Center; 19,218	1–1

November : 9–7 (home: 5–2; road: 4–5)

Game	Date	Team	Score	High points	High rebounds	High assists	Location Attendance	Record
3	November 1	@ L.A. Lakers	W 103–93	Dirk Nowitzki (25)	Zaza Pachulia (12)	Deron Williams (8)	Staples Center; 18,997	2–1
4	November 3	Toronto	L 91–102	Dirk Nowitzki (18)	Dwight Powell (10)	Devin Harris (6)	American Airlines Center; 20,034	2–2
5	November 5	Charlotte	L 92–108	Deron Williams (15)	Zaza Pachulia (10)	J.J. Barea (6)	American Airlines Center; 19,635	2–3
6	November 7	New Orleans	W 107–98	Deron Williams (19)	Zaza Pachulia (14)	Devin Harris (6)	American Airlines Center; 20,454	3–3
7	November 10	@ New Orleans	L 105–120	Dirk Nowitzki (18)	Charlie Villanueva (9)	J.J. Barea (5)	Smoothie King Center; 17,128	3–4
8	November 11	L.A. Clippers	W 118–108	Dirk Nowitzki (31)	Dirk Nowitzki (11)	J.J. Barea (7)	American Airlines Center; 17,128	4–4
9	November 13	L.A. Lakers	W 90–82	Zaza Pachulia (18)	Zaza Pachulia (16)	Deron Williams (7)	American Airlines Center; 20,260	5–4
10	November 14	@ Houston	W 110–98	Raymond Felton (23)	Dwight Powell (9)	J.J. Barea (8)	Toyota Center; 18,231	6–4
11	November 16	@ Philadelphia	W 92–86	Dirk Nowitzki (21)	Dwight Powell (8)	Deron Williams (6)	Wells Fargo Center; 11,555	7–4
12	November 18	@ Boston	W 106–102	Dirk Nowitzki (23)	Zaza Pachulia (12)	Deron Williams (6)	TD Garden; 17,262	8–4
13	November 20	Utah	W 102–93	Deron Williams (23)	Zaza Pachulia (12)	Deron Williams (8)	American Airlines Center; 20,028	9–4
14	November 22	@ Oklahoma City	L 114–117	Deron Williams (20)	Zaza Pachulia (10)	Pachulia, Williams (6)	Chesapeake Energy Arena; 18,203	9–5
15	November 24	@ Memphis	L 96–110	Barea, Felton (16)	Nowitzki, Pachulia (10)	Barea, Matthews (4)	FedExForum; 17,381	9–6
16	November 25	@ San Antonio	L 83–88	Wesley Matthews (15)	Dirk Nowitzki (14)	Deron Williams (9)	AT&T Center; 18,418	9–7
17	November 28	Denver	W 92–81	Deron Williams (22)	Zaza Pachulia (12)	Matthews, Williams (4)	American Airlines Center; 20,339	10–7
18	November 30	@ Sacramento	L 98–112	Chandler Parsons (14)	Zaza Pachulia (10)	Felton, Williams (7)	Sleep Train Arena; 16,937	10–8

December : 9–5 (home: 5–3; road: 4–2)

Game	Date	Team	Score	High points	High rebounds	High assists	Location Attendance	Record
19	December 1	@ Portland	W 115–112 (OT)	Deron Williams (30)	Zaza Pachulia (21)	Deron Williams (8)	Moda Center; 19,393	11–8
20	December 4	Houston	L 96–100	Deron Williams (22)	Zaza Pachulia (11)	Deron Williams (6)	American Airlines Center; 20,339	11–9
21	December 6	@ Washington	W 116–104	Wesley Matthews (36)	Raymond Felton (10)	Deron Williams (9)	Verizon Center; 16,394	12–9
22	December 7	@ New York	W 104–97	Dirk Nowitzki (25)	Zaza Pachulia (8)	Deron Williams (7)	Madison Square Garden; 19,812	13–9
23	December 9	Atlanta	L 95–98	Deron Williams (18)	Zaza Pachulia (17)	Deron Williams (6)	American Airlines Center; 19,936	13–10
24	December 12	Washington	L 111–114	Wesley Matthews (28)	Zaza Pachulia (12)	Deron Williams (11)	American Airlines Center; 20,088	13–11
25	December 14	Phoenix	W 104–94	Deron Williams (18)	Zaza Pachulia (12)	Felton, Nowitzki (4)	American Airlines Center; 19,822	14–11
26	December 16	@ Indiana	L 81–107	Raymond Felton (16)	Zaza Pachulia (14)	Deron Williams (6)	Bankers Life Fieldhouse; 14,824	14–12
27	December 18	Memphis	W 97–88	Dirk Nowitzki (20)	Zaza Pachulia (18)	Chandler Parsons (7)	American Airlines Center; 20,199	15–12
28	December 22	@ Toronto	L 99–103	Dirk Nowitzki (20)	Dirk Nowitzki (7)	Deron Williams (6)	Air Canada Centre; 19,800	15–13
29	December 23	@ Brooklyn	W 119–118 (OT)	J.J. Barea (32)	Chandler Parsons (7)	J.J. Barea (11)	Barclays Center; 15,994	16–13
30	December 26	Chicago	W 118–111	J.J. Barea (26)	Zaza Pachulia (12)	three players (5)	American Airlines Center; 20,392	17–13
31	December 28	Milwaukee	W 103–93	Wesley Matthews (22)	Zaza Pachulia (8)	J.J. Barea (5)	American Airlines Center; 20,300	18–13
32	December 30	Golden State	W 114–91	J.J. Barea (23)	Zaza Pachulia (15)	J.J. Barea (6)	American Airlines Center; 20,494	19–13

January : 9–9 (home: 5–3; road: 4–6)

Game	Date	Team	Score	High points	High rebounds	High assists	Location Attendance	Record
33	January 1	@ Miami	L 82–106	Zaza Pachulia (14)	Zaza Pachulia (13)	three players (5)	American Airlines Arena; 19,748	19–14
34	January 2	New Orleans	L 98–105	Dirk Nowitzki (24)	Zaza Pachulia (9)	J.J. Barea (5)	American Airlines Center; 20,152	19–15
35	January 5	Sacramento	W 117–116 (2OT)	Deron Williams (25)	Zaza Pachulia (17)	three players (4)	American Airlines Center; 20,059	20–15
36	January 6	@ New Orleans	W 100–91	Raymond Felton (22)	Dwight Powell (10)	Raymond Felton (6)	CenturyLink Center; 15,255	21–15
37	January 8	@ Milwaukee	L 95–96	Dirk Nowitzki (20)	Zaza Pachulia (12)	Deron Williams (6)	BMO Harris Bradley Center; 16,409	21–16
38	January 10	@ Minnesota	W 93–87	Dirk Nowitzki (29)	Zaza Pachulia (11)	Barea, Williams (4)	Target Center; 14,363	22–16
39	January 12	Cleveland	L 107–110 (OT)	Chandler Parsons (25)	Zaza Pachulia (12)	Deron Williams (10)	American Airlines Center; 20,347	22–17
40	January 13	@ Oklahoma City	L 89–108	J.J Barea (18)	Mejri, Powell (9)	J.J Barea (6)	Chesapeake Energy Arena; 18,203	22–18
41	January 15	@ Chicago	W 83–77	Dirk Nowitzki (21)	Zaza Pachulia (10)	Deron Williams (6)	United Center; 22,056	23–18
42	January 17	@ San Antonio	L 83–112	Dwight Powell (15)	JaVale McGee (10)	J.J Barea (4)	AT&T Center; 18,418	23–19
43	January 18	Boston	W 118–113 (OT)	Dirk Nowitzki (31)	Zaza Pachulia (19)	Deron Williams (6)	American Airlines Center; 19,866	24–19
44	January 20	Minnesota	W 106–94 (OT)	Chandler Parsons (30)	McGee, Parsons (8)	three players (4)	American Airlines Center; 19,621	25–19
45	January 22	Oklahoma City	L 106–109	Chandler Parsons (26)	Zaza Pachulia (8)	Pachulia, Williams (5)	American Airlines Center; 20,284	25–20
46	January 24	@ Houston	L 104–115	Chandler Parsons (31)	Salah Mejri (11)	Deron Williams (5)	Toyota Center; 18,142	25–21
47	January 26	@ L.A. Lakers	W 92–90	J.J. Barea (18)	Chandler Parsons (9)	Wesley Matthews (5)	Staples Center; 18,997	26–21
48	January 27	@ Golden State	L 107–127	Chandler Parsons (23)	Chandler Parsons (7)	J.J. Barea (5)	Oracle Arena; 19,596	26–22
49	January 29	Brooklyn	W 91–79	Chandler Parsons (19)	Zaza Pachulia (12)	Deron Williams (6)	American Airlines Center; 20,409	27–22
50	January 31	Phoenix	W 91–78	Deron Williams (27)	Zaza Pachulia (15)	Raymond Felton (6)	American Airlines Center; 20,137	28–22

February : 4–6 (home: 3–4; road: 1–2)

Game	Date	Team	Score	High points	High rebounds	High assists	Location Attendance	Record
51	February 1	@ Atlanta	L 97–112	Chandler Parsons (19)	Zaza Pachulia (13)	J.J. Barea (4)	Philips Arena; 15,455	28–23
52	February 3	Miami	L 90–93	Dirk Nowitzki (28)	Zaza Pachulia (15)	three players (4)	American Airlines Center; 20,385	28–24
53	February 5	San Antonio	L 90–116	Anderson, Villanueva (13)	Dirk Nowitzki (8)	Raymond Felton (4)	American Airlines Center; 20,404	28–25
54	February 6	@ Memphis	W 114–110 (OT)	Chandler Parsons (26)	Chandler Parsons (8)	Deron Williams (11)	FedExForum; 18,119	29–25
55	February 9	Utah	L 119–121 (OT)	Chandler Parsons (24)	Zaza Pachulia (11)	J.J. Barea (6)	American Airlines Center; 19,394	29–26
All-Star Break
56	February 19	@ Orlando	L 104–110 (OT)	Chandler Parsons (24)	Zaza Pachulia (11)	Deron Williams (7)	Amway Center; 17,764	29–27
57	February 21	Philadelphia	W 129–103	Wesley Matthews (21)	Zaza Pachulia (10)	Deron Williams (8)	American Airlines Center; 20,194	30–27
58	February 24	Oklahoma City	L 103–116	Dirk Nowitzki (33)	Zaza Pachulia (10)	Raymond Felton (9)	American Airlines Center; 19,805	30–28
59	February 26	Denver	W 122–116 (OT)	Chandler Parsons (27)	Dirk Nowitzki (13)	Raymond Felton (6)	American Airlines Center; 20,298	31–28
60	February 28	Minnesota	W 128–101	Chandler Parsons (29)	David Lee (9)	Deron Williams (8)	American Airlines Center; 20,289	32–28

March : 5–10 (home: 3–5; road: 2–5)

Game	Date	Team	Score	High points	High rebounds	High assists	Location Attendance	Record
61	March 1	Orlando	W 121–108	Wesley Matthews (21)	Zaza Pachulia (10)	Deron Williams (6)	American Airlines Center; 19,546	33–28
62	March 3	Sacramento	L 101–104	Chandler Parsons (28)	David Lee (11)	three players (5)	American Airlines Center; 19,910	33–29
63	March 6	@ Denver	L 114–116 (OT)	Dirk Nowitzki (30)	David Lee (12)	Felton, Williams (5)	Pepsi Center; 14,802	33–30
64	March 7	L.A. Clippers	L 90–109	Dirk Nowitzki (22)	three players (8)	Barea, Williams (4)	American Airlines Center; 20,002	33–31
65	March 9	Detroit	L 96–102	Nowitzki, Parsons (25)	Zaza Pachulia (13)	Deron Williams (9)	American Airlines Center; 20,249	33–32
66	March 12	Indiana	L 105–112	Dirk Nowitzki (30)	Zaza Pachulia (9)	Deron Williams (8)	American Airlines Center; 20,459	33–33
67	March 14	@ Charlotte	W 107–96	Chandler Parsons (24)	Dirk Nowitzki (11)	Raymond Felton (12)	Time Warner Cable Arena; 15,686	34–33
68	March 16	@ Cleveland	L 98–99	Lee, Nowitzki (20)	Devin Harris (6)	Chandler Parsons (10)	Quicken Loans Arena; 20,562	34–34
69	March 18	Golden State	L 112–130	Dirk Nowitzki (24)	Dirk Nowitzki (9)	Deron Williams (7)	American Airlines Center; 20,515	34–35
70	March 20	Portland	W 132–120 (OT)	Dirk Nowitzki (40)	Salah Mejri (14)	Deron Williams (16)	American Airlines Center; 20,351	35–35
71	March 23	@ Portland	L 103–109	Wesley Matthews (22)	Salah Mejri (12)	Deron Williams (11)	Moda Center; 19,819	35–36
72	March 25	@ Golden State	L 120–128	Wesley Matthews (26)	Zaza Pachulia (13)	Barea, Lee (6)	Oracle Arena; 19,596	35–37
73	March 27	@ Sacramento	L 111–133	Raymond Felton (15)	Lee, Powell (6)	Raymond Felton (5)	Sleep Train Arena; 17,147	35–38
74	March 28	@ Denver	W 97–88	J.J. Barea (18)	Dwight Powell (7)	J.J. Barea (11)	Pepsi Center; 14,844	36–38
75	March 30	New York	W 91–89	J.J. Barea (26)	Zaza Pachulia (9)	J.J. Barea (7)	American Airlines Center; 20,435	37–38

April : 5–2 (home: 2–1; road: 3–1)

Game	Date	Team	Score	High points	High rebounds	High assists	Location Attendance	Record
76	April 1	@ Detroit	W 98–89	J.J. Barea (29)	Zaza Pachulia (11)	four players (3)	The Palace of Auburn Hills; 19,031	38–38
77	April 3	@ Minnesota	W 88–78	J.J. Barea (21)	Justin Anderson (10)	J.J. Barea (6)	Target Center; 16,117	39–38
78	April 6	Houston	W 88–86	J.J. Barea (27)	David Lee (8)	J.J. Barea (8)	American Airlines Center; 20,108	40–38
79	April 8	Memphis	W 103–93	Dirk Nowitzki (21)	Justin Anderson (10)	Raymond Felton (14)	American Airlines Center; 20,211	41–38
80	April 10	@ L.A. Clippers	L 91–98	Raymond Felton (21)	David Lee (7)	Raymond Felton (5)	Staples Center; 19,170	41–39
81	April 11	@ Utah	W 101–92	Deron Williams (23)	Dirk Nowitzki (11)	Deron Williams (6)	Vivint Smart Home Arena; 19,911	42–39
82	April 13	San Antonio	L 91–96	Raymond Felton (23)	Zaza Pachulia (12)	Deron Williams (7)	American Airlines Center; 20,346	42–40

2015–16 season schedule

=== Playoffs ===
2016 playoff game log
Total: 1–4 (home: 0–2; road: 1–2)
First Round: 1–4 (home: 0–2; road: 1–2)

Game	Date	Team	Score	High points	High rebounds	High assists	Location Attendance	Series
1	April 16	@ Oklahoma City	L 70–108	Dirk Nowitzki (18)	Pachulia, Powell (6)	Barea, Williams (3)	Chesapeake Energy Arena; 18,203	0–1
2	April 18	@ Oklahoma City	W 85–84	Raymond Felton (21)	Raymond Felton (11)	Deron Williams (5)	Chesapeake Energy Arena; 18,203	1–1
3	April 21	Oklahoma City	L 102–131	Wesley Matthews (22)	Dirk Nowitzki (5)	J. J. Barea (7)	American Airlines Center; 20,150	1–2
4	April 23	Oklahoma City	L 108–119	Dirk Nowitzki (27)	Dirk Nowitzki (8)	Raymond Felton (8)	American Airlines Center; 20,516	1–3
5	April 25	@ Oklahoma City	L 103–118	Dirk Nowitzki (24)	Dwight Powell (9)	Zaza Pachulia (9)	Chesapeake Energy Arena; 18,203	1–4

2016 playoff schedule

== Player statistics ==
=== Regular season ===
Player	POS	GP	GS	MP	REB	AST	STL	BLK	PTS	MPG	RPG	APG	SPG	BPG	PPG
Raymond Felton	PG	80	31	2,192	258	284	68	15	763	27.4	3.2	3.6	.9	.2	9.5
Wesley Matthews	SF	78	78	2,644	238	151	78	17	977	33.9	3.1	1.9	1.0	.2	12.5
Zaza Pachulia	C	76	69	2,004	718	128	64	22	650	26.4	9.4	1.7	.8	.3	8.6
Dirk Nowitzki	PF	75	75	2,364	489	132	52	52	1,372	31.5	6.5	1.8	.7	.7	18.3
J. J. Barea	PG	74	16	1,667	152	302	26	2	808	22.5	2.1	4.1	.4	.0	10.9
Dwight Powell	PF	69	2	992	273	44	36	24	399	14.4	4.0	.6	.5	.3	5.8
Deron Williams	PG	65	63	2,106	190	378	61	14	918	32.4	2.9	5.8	.9	.2	14.1
Devin Harris	PG	64	0	1,280	138	118	60	13	487	20.0	2.2	1.8	.9	.2	7.6
Charlie Villanueva	PF	62	4	665	152	24	18	15	319	10.7	2.5	.4	.3	.2	5.1
Chandler Parsons	SF	61	51	1,799	285	169	46	21	837	29.5	4.7	2.8	.8	.3	13.7
Justin Anderson	SF	55	9	647	132	29	19	25	208	11.8	2.4	.5	.3	.5	3.8
Salah Mejri	C	34	6	397	123	10	8	36	125	11.7	3.6	.3	.2	1.1	3.7
JaVale McGee	C	34	2	370	133	3	5	26	172	10.9	3.9	.1	.1	.8	5.1
Jeremy Evans	SF	30	2	251	54	2	6	9	71	8.4	1.8	.1	.2	.3	2.4
David Lee^{†}	PF	25	1	433	175	30	10	15	213	17.3	7.0	1.2	.4	.6	8.5
John Jenkins^{†}	SG	21	1	193	22	9	3	0	69	9.2	1.0	.4	.1	.0	3.3

- ^{†} Denotes player spent time with another team in the season. Stats reflect time with the Mavericks only.

=== Playoffs ===
Player	POS	GP	GS	MP	REB	AST	STL	BLK	PTS	MPG	RPG	APG	SPG	BPG	PPG
Wesley Matthews	SF	5	5	173	18	6	6	0	65	34.6	3.6	1.2	1.2	.0	13.0
Dirk Nowitzki	PF	5	5	170	24	8	2	3	102	34.0	4.8	1.6	.4	.6	20.4
Raymond Felton	PG	5	4	172	23	23	6	0	75	34.4	4.6	4.6	1.2	.0	15.0
Zaza Pachulia	C	5	4	112	27	16	3	1	33	22.4	5.4	3.2	.6	.2	6.6
Justin Anderson	SF	5	1	95	20	7	4	3	47	19.0	4.0	1.4	.8	.6	9.4
Devin Harris	PG	5	0	121	14	8	3	0	39	24.2	2.8	1.6	.6	.0	7.8
J. J. Barea	PG	4	2	100	6	20	0	0	25	25.0	1.5	5.0	.0	.0	6.3
Salah Mejri	C	4	1	76	13	1	3	5	19	19.0	3.3	.3	.8	1.3	4.8
Dwight Powell	PF	4	0	64	17	4	1	0	24	16.0	4.3	1.0	.3	.0	6.0
Charlie Villanueva	PF	4	0	20	2	1	0	0	9	5.0	.5	.3	.0	.0	2.3
Deron Williams	PG	3	3	49	2	8	1	0	15	16.3	.7	2.7	.3	.0	5.0
David Lee	PF	2	0	33	6	1	0	0	12	16.5	3.0	.5	.0	.0	6.0
JaVale McGee	C	2	0	14	3	0	1	0	4	7.0	1.5	.0	.5	.0	2.0

== Roster ==
2015–16 Dallas Mavericks roster
Players

Pos.	No.	Player	Height	Weight	DOB	From
G/F	1	Justin Anderson	6 ft 6 in (1.98 m)	228 lb (103 kg)	1993–11–19	Virginia
G	5	José Juan Barea	6 ft 0 in (1.83 m)	185 lb (84 kg)	1984–06–26	Northeastern
F	21	Jeremy Evans	6 ft 9 in (2.06 m)	200 lb (91 kg)	1987–10–24	Western Kentucky
G	2	Raymond Felton	6 ft 1 in (1.85 m)	205 lb (93 kg)	1984–06–26	North Carolina
G	34	Devin Harris	6 ft 3 in (1.91 m)	185 lb (84 kg)	1983–02–27	Wisconsin
F/C	42	David Lee	6 ft 9 in (2.06 m)	245 lb (111 kg)	1983–04–29	Florida
G	23	Wesley Matthews	6 ft 5 in (1.96 m)	220 lb (100 kg)	1986–10–14	Marquette
C	11	JaVale McGee	7 ft 0 in (2.13 m)	270 lb (122 kg)	1988–01–19	Nevada
C	50	Salah Mejri	7 ft 2 in (2.18 m)	245 lb (111 kg)	1986–06–15	Tunisia
F	41	Dirk Nowitzki	7 ft 0 in (2.13 m)	245 lb (111 kg)	1978–06–19	Germany
C	27	Zaza Pachulia	6 ft 11 in (2.11 m)	275 lb (125 kg)	1984–02–10	Georgia
F	25	Chandler Parsons	6 ft 10 in (2.08 m)	230 lb (104 kg)	1988–10–25	Florida
F	7	Dwight Powell	6 ft 11 in (2.11 m)	240 lb (109 kg)	1991–07–20	Stanford
F	3	Charlie Villanueva	6 ft 11 in (2.11 m)	232 lb (105 kg)	1984–08–24	Connecticut
G	8	Deron Williams	6 ft 3 in (1.91 m)	200 lb (91 kg)	1984–06–26	Illinois

Coaches
Head coach
- Rick Carlisle
Assistant(s)
- Darrell Armstrong
- Kaleb Canales
- Melvin Hunt
- Jamahl Mosley

Legend
- (DP) Unsigned draft pick
- (FA) Free agent
- (S) Suspended
- (DL) On assignment to D-League affiliate
- Injured

Roster
Updated: 2016–02–22

== Milestones ==
- On December 23, 2015, Dirk Nowitzki passed Shaquille O'Neal to move into sixth place on the all-time scoring list.

== Transactions ==
=== Trades ===
July 9, 2015	To Dallas Mavericks Zaza Pachulia	To Milwaukee Bucks Future second-round draft pick

=== Free agents ===
==== Re-signed ====
Player	Signed
José Juan Barea	Signed 4-year contract worth $16 million
Charlie Villanueva	Signed 1-year contract worth the veteran minimum

==== Additions ====
Player	Signed	Former Team
Brandon Ashley	Signed 3-year contract worth $2.4 million	University of Arizona
Samuel Dalembert	Signed 1-year contract worth the veteran minimum	New York Knicks
Jeremy Evans	Signed 2-year contract worth the veteran minimum	Utah Jazz
Jarrid Famous	Signed 3-year contract worth the veteran minimum	GlobalPort Batang Pier
Tu Holloway	Signed 1-year contract worth the veteran minimum	Mets de Guaynabo
John Jenkins	Signed 3-year contract worth the veteran minimum	Atlanta Hawks
David Lee	Signed 1-year contract worth $2.1 million	Boston Celtics
Wesley Matthews	Signed 4-year contract worth $70 million	Portland Trail Blazers
JaVale McGee	Signed 2-year contract worth the veteran minimum	Philadelphia 76ers
Salah Mejri	Signed 3-year contract	Real Madrid
Maurice Ndour	Signed 3-year contract worth the veteran minimum	Ohio
Deron Williams	Signed 2-year contract worth $10 million	Brooklyn Nets
Jamil Wilson	Signed 3-year contract worth $2.4 million	Bakersfield Jam

==== Subtractions ====
Player	Reason Left	New Team
Al-Farouq Aminu	Signed 4-year contract worth $30 million	Portland Trail Blazers
Brandon Ashley	Waived	Texas Legends
Tyson Chandler	Signed 4-year contract worth $52 million	Phoenix Suns
Samuel Dalembert	Waived	Shanxi Zhongyu
Monta Ellis	Signed 4-year contract worth $44 million	Indiana Pacers
Jarrid Famous	Waived	Fujian Sturgeons
Tu Holloway	Waived	Texas Legends
Bernard James	Team renounced rights	Shanghai Sharks
Richard Jefferson	Signed 1-year contract worth $1.5 million	Cleveland Cavaliers
John Jenkins	Waived	Phoenix Suns
DeAndre Jordan	Opted out of contract; Signed 4-year contract worth $88 million	Los Angeles Clippers
Maurice Ndour	Waived	Real Madrid
Rajon Rondo	Signed 1-year contract worth $9.5 million	Sacramento Kings
Greg Smith	Not re-signed	Raptors 905
Amar'e Stoudemire	Signed 1-year contract worth the veteran minimum	Miami Heat
Jamil Wilson	Waived	Texas Legends
