= 2015–16 Los Angeles Clippers season =

NBA professional basketball team season

- Head coach: Doc Rivers
- Owners: Steve Ballmer
- Arena: Staples Center

Results
- Record: 53–29 (.646)
- Place: Division: 2nd (Pacific); Conference: 4th (Western)
- Playoff finish: First Round (lost to Trail Blazers 2–4)
- Stats at Basketball Reference

Local media
- Television: Fox Sports West and Prime Ticket
- Radio: KFWB

The 2015–16 Los Angeles Clippers season was the 46th season of the franchise in the National Basketball Association (NBA), their 38th season in Southern California, and their 32nd season in Los Angeles.

On July 8, despite offers from the Dallas Mavericks, DeAndre Jordan returned to the Clippers with a 4-year, $87.7 million deal.

During the offseason the Clippers signed veteran and Boston Celtics legend Paul Pierce and he played the rest of his career as a Clipper. The signing reunited Pierce with his former coach Doc Rivers, who coached the Celtics from 2004 to 2013 and won them a championship in 2008.

The Clippers played most of the season without Blake Griffin, who broke his hand in a fight and was subsequently suspended for 4 games. He returned on April 3 after sitting out 45 games.

The Clippers entered the playoffs against the 5th-seeded 44–38 Portland Trail Blazers who were 9 games behind them. However, injuries robbed the team and that was their undoing as they were eliminated in the first round in six games by the Trail Blazers for the first time since 2013, when the team was eliminated by the Memphis Grizzlies.

== Draft ==
The Clippers did not have a pick in the 2015 NBA Draft.

== Roster ==
2015–16 Los Angeles Clippers roster
Players

Pos.	No.	Player	Height	Weight	DOB	From
C	45	Cole Aldrich	6 ft 11 in (2.11 m)	250 lb (113 kg)	1988–10–31	Kansas
C	19	Jeff Ayres (DL)	6 ft 10 in (2.08 m)	252 lb (114 kg)	1987–04–29	Arizona State
SG	11	Jamal Crawford	6 ft 5 in (1.96 m)	200 lb (91 kg)	1980–03–20	Michigan
SF	22	Branden Dawson	6 ft 6 in (1.98 m)	225 lb (102 kg)	1993–02–01	Michigan State
SF	8	Jeff Green	6 ft 9 in (2.06 m)	235 lb (107 kg)	1986–08–28	Georgetown
PF	32	Blake Griffin	6 ft 10 in (2.08 m)	251 lb (114 kg)	1989–03–16	Oklahoma
SF	33	Wesley Johnson	6 ft 7 in (2.01 m)	215 lb (98 kg)	1987–07–11	Syracuse
C	6	DeAndre Jordan	6 ft 11 in (2.11 m)	265 lb (120 kg)	1988–07–21	Texas A&M
SF	12	Luc Mbah a Moute	6 ft 8 in (2.03 m)	230 lb (104 kg)	1986–09–09	UCLA
PG	3	Chris Paul	6 ft 0 in (1.83 m)	175 lb (79 kg)	1985–05–06	Wake Forest
SF	34	Paul Pierce	6 ft 7 in (2.01 m)	235 lb (107 kg)	1977–10–13	Kansas
PG	9	Pablo Prigioni	6 ft 3 in (1.91 m)	185 lb (84 kg)	1977–05–17	Argentina
SG	4	JJ Redick	6 ft 4 in (1.93 m)	190 lb (86 kg)	1984–06–24	Duke
PG	25	Austin Rivers	6 ft 4 in (1.93 m)	200 lb (91 kg)	1992–08–01	Duke
SG	30	C. J. Wilcox	6 ft 5 in (1.96 m)	195 lb (88 kg)	1990–12–30	Washington

Coaches
Head coach
- Doc Rivers
Assistant(s)
- Sam Cassell
- Lawrence Frank
- Armond Hill
- Brendan O'Connor
- Mike Woodson
- J. P. Clark (player development)
- Dave Severns (player development)

Legend
- (DP) Unsigned draft pick
- (FA) Free agent
- (S) Suspended
- (DL) On assignment to D-League affiliate
- Injured

Roster
Updated: 2016–03–29

=== Roster notes ===
- Forward Wesley Johnson becomes the 25th former Laker to play for the crosstown rival Clippers.

== Preseason ==
2015 pre-season game log
Total: 3–3 (home: 3–1; road: 0–2)
Pre-season: 3–3 (home: 3–1; road: 0–2)

Game	Date	Team	Score	High points	High rebounds	High assists	Location Attendance	Record
1	October 2	Denver	103–96	DeAndre Jordan (15)	DeAndre Jordan (11)	Chris Paul (9)	Staples Center; 14,245	1–0
2	October 4	@ Toronto	73–93	JJ Redick (15)	DeAndre Jordan (10)	Chris Paul (8)	Rogers Arena; 19,000	1–1
3	October 11	@ Charlotte	94–106	JJ Redick (23)	Blake Griffin (9)	Blake Griffin (10)	(China) Shenzhen Universiade Sports Centre (Shenzhen); 17,376	1–2
4	October 14	Charlotte	71–113	Chris Paul (17)	Blake Griffin (14)	Chris Paul (6)	(China) Mercedes-Benz Arena (Shanghai); 15,905	1–3
5	October 20	Golden State	130–95	Blake Griffin (29)	DeAndre Jordan (10)	Chris Paul (10)	Staples Center; 15,889	2–3
6	October 22	Portland	115–109	Blake Griffin (22)	DeAndre Jordan (13)	Chris Paul (8)	Staples Center; 13,969	3–3

2015–16 season schedule

== Standing ==
=== By Division ===
Pacific Division	W	L	PCT	GB	Home	Road	Div	GP
z – Golden State Warriors	73	9	.890	–	39‍–‍2	34‍–‍7	15–1	82
x – Los Angeles Clippers	53	29	.646	20.0	29‍–‍12	24‍–‍17	9–7	82
e – Sacramento Kings	33	49	.402	40.0	18‍–‍23	15‍–‍26	8–8	82
e – Phoenix Suns	23	59	.280	50.0	14‍–‍27	9‍–‍32	6–10	82
e – Los Angeles Lakers	17	65	.207	56.0	12‍–‍29	5‍–‍36	2–14	82

=== By Conference ===
Western Conference
#	Team	W	L	PCT	GB	GP
1	z – Golden State Warriors *	73	9	.890	–	82
2	y – San Antonio Spurs *	67	15	.817	6.0	82
3	y – Oklahoma City Thunder *	55	27	.671	18.0	82
4	x – Los Angeles Clippers	53	29	.646	20.0	82
5	x – Portland Trail Blazers	44	38	.537	29.0	82
6	x – Dallas Mavericks	42	40	.512	31.0	82
7	x – Memphis Grizzlies	42	40	.512	31.0	82
8	x – Houston Rockets	41	41	.500	32.0	82
9	e – Utah Jazz	40	42	.488	33.0	82
10	e – Sacramento Kings	33	49	.402	40.0	82
11	e – Denver Nuggets	33	49	.402	40.0	82
12	e – New Orleans Pelicans	30	52	.366	43.0	82
13	e – Minnesota Timberwolves	29	53	.354	44.0	82
14	e – Phoenix Suns	23	59	.280	50.0	82
15	e – Los Angeles Lakers	17	65	.207	56.0	82

== Regular season game log ==
2015–16 game log
Total: 53–29 (home: 29–12; road: 24–17)
All game times Pacific
October: 3–0 (home: 2–0; road: 1–0)

Game	Date	Team	Score	High points	High rebounds	High assists	Location Attendance	Record
1	October 28; 7pm	@ Sacramento	W 111–104	Blake Griffin (33)	DeAndre Jordan (12)	Chris Paul (11)	Sleep Train Arena; 17,458	1–0
2	October 29; 7:30 pm	Dallas	W 104–88	Blake Griffin (26)	DeAndre Jordan (14)	Chris Paul (5)	Staples Center; 19,218	2–0
3	October 31; 7:30 pm	Sacramento	W 114–109	Blake Griffin (37)	DeAndre Jordan (18)	Chris Paul (11)	Staples Center; 19,060	3–0

November : 7–8 (home: 6–4; road: 1–4)

Game	Date	Team	Score	High points	High rebounds	High assists	Location Attendance	Record
4	November 2; 7:30 pm	Phoenix	W 102–96	Blake Griffin (22)	Blake Griffin (10)	Chris Paul (5)	Staples Center; 19,060	4–0
5	November 4; 7:30 pm	@ Golden State	L 108–112	Chris Paul (24)	DeAndre Jordan (13)	Chris Paul (9)	Oracle Arena; 19,596	4–1
6	November 7; 7:30 pm	Houston	L 105–109	Blake Griffin (35)	DeAndre Jordan (14)	Griffin, Pierce (5)	Staples Center; 19,361	4–2
7	November 9; 7:30 pm	Memphis	W 94–92	Blake Griffin (24)	Griffin, Jordan (12)	Chris Paul (4)	Staples Center; 19,060	5–2
8	November 11; 5pm	@ Dallas	L 108–118	Blake Griffin (21)	DeAndre Jordan (11)	Chris Paul (11)	American Airlines Center; 19,805	5–3
9	November 12; 7:30 pm	@ Phoenix	L 104–118	Jamal Crawford (18)	DeAndre Jordan (9)	Blake Griffin (4)	Talking Stick Resort Arena; 17,204	5–4
10	November 14; 12:30 pm	Detroit	W 101–96	Jamal Crawford (37)	DeAndre Jordan (16)	Blake Griffin (9)	Staples Center; 19,060	6–4
11	November 19; 7:30 pm	Golden State	L 117–124	Chris Paul (35)	DeAndre Jordan (8)	Chris Paul (8)	Staples Center; 19,528	6–5
12	November 20; 7pm	@ Portland	L 91–102	Blake Griffin (21)	DeAndre Jordan (15)	Chris Paul (8)	Moda Center; 19,393	6–6
13	November 22; 12:30 pm	Toronto	L 80–91	JJ Redick (17)	DeAndre Jordan (14)	Chris Paul (11)	Staples Center; 19,060	6–7
14	November 24; 6pm	@ Denver	W 111–94	Jordan, Griffin (18)	DeAndre Jordan (11)	Chris Paul (10)	Pepsi Center; 13,257	7–7
15	November 25; 7:30 pm	Utah	L 91–102	Blake Griffin (40)	Blake Griffin (12)	Chris Paul (8)	Staples Center; 19,060	7–8
16	November 27; 7:30 pm	New Orleans	W 111–90	Griffin, Paul (20)	DeAndre Jordan (11)	Chris Paul (8)	Staples Center; 19,162	8–8
17	November 29; 12:30 pm	Minnesota	W 107–99	Blake Griffin (26)	DeAndre Jordan (9)	Chris Paul (9)	Staples Center; 19,060	9–8
18	November 30; 7:30 pm	Portland	W 102–87	Blake Griffin (23)	DeAndre Jordan (24)	Griffin, Paul (6)	Staples Center; 19,060	10–8

December : 11–5 (home: 2–2; road: 9–3)

Game	Date	Team	Score	High points	High rebounds	High assists	Location Attendance	Record
19	December 2; 7:30 pm	Indiana	L 91–103	Griffin, Stephenson (19)	DeAndre Jordan (15)	Blake Griffin (6)	Staples Center; 19,060	10–9
20	December 5; 7:30 pm	Orlando	W 103–101	Jamal Crawford (32)	DeAndre Jordan (14)	Blake Griffin (7)	Staples Center; 19,146	11–9
21	December 7; 5pm	@ Minnesota	W 110–106	DeAndre Jordan (20)	DeAndre Jordan (12)	Jamal Crawford (7)	Target Center; 11,467	12–9
22	December 9; 5pm	@ Milwaukee	W 109–95	JJ Redick (31)	DeAndre Jordan (21)	Chris Paul (18)	BMO Harris Bradley Center; 14,224	13–9
23	December 10; 5pm	@ Chicago	L 80–83	Blake Griffin (18)	DeAndre Jordan (14)	Chris Paul (5)	United Center; 21,491	13–10
24	December 12; 2pm	@ Brooklyn	W 105–100	Griffin, Redick (21)	DeAndre Jordan (12)	Chris Paul (14)	Barclays Center; 15,689	14–10
25	December 14; 4:30 pm	@ Detroit	W 105–103 (OT)	Blake Griffin (34)	DeAndre Jordan (14)	Chris Paul (12)	The Palace of Auburn Hills; 13,525	15–10
26	December 16; 7:30 pm	Milwaukee	W 103–90	Chris Paul (21)	Griffin, Jordan (8)	Chris Paul (8)	Staples Center; 19,060	16–10
27	December 18; 5pm	@ San Antonio	L 107–115	Chris Paul (27)	DeAndre Jordan (17)	Chris Paul (10)	AT&T Center; 18,418	16–11
28	December 19; 5pm	@ Houston	L 97–107	Blake Griffin (22)	DeAndre Jordan (11)	Chris Paul (10)	Toyota Center; 18,212	16–12
29	December 21; 7:30 pm	Oklahoma City	L 99–100	Chris Paul (32)	DeAndre Jordan (10)	Chris Paul (10)	Staples Center; 19,415	16–13
30	December 25; 7:30 pm	@ L.A. Lakers	W 94–84	Chris Paul (23)	DeAndre Jordan (14)	Chris Paul (6)	Staples Center; 18,997	17–13
31	December 26; 6pm	@ Utah	W 109–104	JJ Redick (25)	DeAndre Jordan (13)	Chris Paul (11)	Vivint Smart Home Arena; 19,911	18–13
32	December 28; 4pm	@ Washington	W 108–91	Chris Paul (23)	DeAndre Jordan (13)	Chris Paul (7)	Verizon Center; 20,356	19–13
33	December 30; 4pm	@ Charlotte	W 122–117	JJ Redick (26)	DeAndre Jordan (13)	Chris Paul (11)	Time Warner Cable Arena; 19,145	20–13
34	December 31; 5pm	@ New Orleans	W 95–89	JJ Redick (26)	DeAndre Jordan (20)	Chris Paul (12)	Smoothie King Center; 16,920	21–13

January : 11–3 (home: 7–1; road: 4–2)

Game	Date	Team	Score	High points	High rebounds	High assists	Location Attendance	Record
35	January 2; 7:30 pm	Philadelphia	W 130–99	DeAndre Jordan (22)	DeAndre Jordan (13)	Chris Paul (14)	Staples Center; 19,212	22–13
36	January 6; 7pm	@ Portland	W 109–98	Chris Paul (21)	DeAndre Jordan (14)	Chris Paul (19)	Moda Center; 18,598	23–13
37	January 9; 12:30 pm	Charlotte	W 97–83	Chris Paul (25)	DeAndre Jordan (19)	Chris Paul (7)	Staples Center; 19,060	24–13
38	January 10; 12:30 pm	New Orleans	W 114–111 (OT)	Chris Paul (25)	DeAndre Jordan (11)	Chris Paul (11)	Staples Center; 19,060	25–13
39	January 13; 7:30 pm	Miami	W 104–90	Cole Aldrich (19)	Paul Pierce (9)	Chris Paul (12)	Staples Center; 19,194	26–13
40	January 16; 7:30 pm	Sacramento	L 103–110	JJ Redick (22)	Cole Aldrich (10)	Chris Paul (7)	Staples Center; 19,191	26–14
41	January 18; 7:30 pm	Houston	W 140–132 (OT)	JJ Redick (40)	DeAndre Jordan (15)	Chris Paul (12)	Staples Center; 19,060	27–14
42	January 21; 5pm	@ Cleveland	L 102–115	Chris Paul (30)	DeAndre Jordan (13)	Chris Paul (9)	Quicken Loans Arena; 20,562	27–15
43	January 22; 4:30 pm	@ New York	W 116–88	DeAndre Jordan (20)	DeAndre Jordan (8)	Chris Paul (13)	Madison Square Garden; 19,812	28–15
44	January 24; 3pm	@ Toronto	L 94–112	Chris Paul (23)	DeAndre Jordan (11)	Chris Paul (13)	Air Canada Centre; 19,800	28–16
45	January 26; 4pm	@ Indiana	W 91–89	Chris Paul (26)	DeAndre Jordan (19)	Chris Paul (7)	Bankers Life Fieldhouse; 15,448	29–16
46	January 27; 5pm	@ Atlanta	W 85–83	Jamal Crawford (21)	DeAndre Jordan (19)	Chris Paul (10)	Philips Arena; 17,664	30–16
47	January 29; 7:30 pm	L.A. Lakers	W 105–93	Chris Paul (27)	DeAndre Jordan (17)	Chris Paul (7)	Staples Center; 19,495	31–16
48	January 31; 12:30 pm	Chicago	W 120–93	Jamal Crawford (26)	DeAndre Jordan (20)	Chris Paul (7)	Staples Center; 19,325	32–16

February : 7–4 (home: 3–3; road: 4–1)

Game	Date	Team	Score	High points	High rebounds	High assists	Location Attendance	Record
49	February 3; 7:30 pm	Minnesota	L 102–108	Chris Paul (22)	DeAndre Jordan (15)	Chris Paul (8)	Staples Center; 19,060	32–17
50	February 5; 4pm	@ Orlando	W 107–93	Chris Paul (21)	DeAndre Jordan (18)	Chris Paul (6)	Amway Center; 16,647	33–17
51	February 7; 11am	@ Miami	W 100–93	Chris Paul (22)	Aldrich, Jordan (11)	Chris Paul (7)	American Airlines Arena; 19,624	34–17
52	February 8; 4pm	@ Philadelphia	W 98–92 (OT)	Crawford, Redick (23)	DeAndre Jordan (21)	Chris Paul (7)	Wells Fargo Center; 13,310	35–17
53	February 10; 4:30 pm	@ Boston	L 134–139 (OT)	Chris Paul (35)	DeAndre Jordan (16)	Chris Paul (13)	TD Garden; 18,186	35–18
All-Star Break
54	February 18; 7:30 pm	San Antonio	W 105–86	Chris Paul (28)	DeAndre Jordan (17)	Chris Paul (12)	Staples Center; 19,410	36–18
55	February 20; 5:30 pm	Golden State	L 112–115	Chris Paul (24)	DeAndre Jordan (21)	Chris Paul (6)	Staples Center; 19,585	36–19
56	February 22; 7:30 pm	Phoenix	W 124–84	JJ Redick (22)	DeAndre Jordan (11)	Chris Paul (14)	Staples Center; 19,060	37–19
57	February 24; 7:30 pm	Denver	L 81–87	Crawford, Redick (20)	DeAndre Jordan (12)	Chris Paul (10)	Staples Center; 19,060	37–20
58	February 26; 7pm	@ Sacramento	W 117–107	Chris Paul (40)	DeAndre Jordan (11)	Chris Paul (13)	Sleep Train Arena; 17,317	38–20
59	February 29; 7:30 pm	Brooklyn	W 105–95	Jamal Crawford (26)	DeAndre Jordan (10)	Chris Paul (12)	Staples Center; 19,060	39–20

March : 8–8 (home: 5–2; road: 3–6)

Game	Date	Team	Score	High points	High rebounds	High assists	Location Attendance	Record
60	March 2; 7:30 pm	Oklahoma City	W 103–98	Chris Paul (21)	DeAndre Jordan (18)	Chris Paul (13)	Staples Center; 19,304	40–20
61	March 5; 7:30 pm	Atlanta	L 97–107	Jordan, Paul (17)	DeAndre Jordan (11)	Chris Paul (11)	Staples Center; 19,236	40–21
62	March 7; 5:30 pm	@ Dallas	W 109–90	Chris Paul (27)	DeAndre Jordan (20)	Chris Paul (7)	American Airlines Center; 20,002	41–21
63	March 9; 6:30 pm	@ Oklahoma City	L 108–120	Jeff Green (23)	DeAndre Jordan (7)	Chris Paul (16)	Chesapeake Energy Arena; 18,203	41–22
64	March 11; 7:30 pm	New York	W 101–94	Chris Paul (24)	DeAndre Jordan (19)	Chris Paul (15)	Staples Center; 19,175	42–22
65	March 13; 12:30 pm	Cleveland	L 90–114	JJ Redick (19)	DeAndre Jordan (11)	Chris Paul (10)	Staples Center; 19,342	42–23
66	March 15; 5:30 pm	@ San Antonio	L 87–108	Chris Paul (22)	DeAndre Jordan (14)	Chris Paul (8)	AT&T Center; 18,418	42–24
67	March 16; 6:30 pm	@ Houston	W 122–106	JJ Redick (25)	DeAndre Jordan (16)	Chris Paul (16)	Toyota Center; 18,304	43–24
68	March 19; 5pm	@ Memphis	L 103–115	Chris Paul (25)	DeAndre Jordan (7)	Chris Paul (6)	FedExForum; 18,119	43–25
69	March 20; 3pm	@ New Orleans	L 105–109	Paul, Redick (21)	DeAndre Jordan (9)	Chris Paul (13)	Smoothie King Center; 17,407	43–26
70	March 23; 7:30 pm	@ Golden State	L 98–114	DeAndre Jordan (19)	DeAndre Jordan (20)	Chris Paul (8)	Oracle Arena; 19,596	43–27
71	March 24; 7:30 pm	Portland	W 96–94	Crawford, Paul (25)	DeAndre Jordan (13)	Chris Paul (5)	Staples Center; 19,359	44–27
72	March 27; 12:30 pm	Denver	W 105–90	DeAndre Jordan (16)	DeAndre Jordan (16)	Chris Paul (9)	Staples Center; 19,060	45–27
73	March 28; 7:30 pm	Boston	W 114–90	Austin Rivers (16)	DeAndre Jordan (13)	Chris Paul (14)	Staples Center; 19,258	46–27
74	March 30; 5pm	@ Minnesota	W 99–79	Chris Paul (20)	Chris Paul (8)	Chris Paul (16)	Target Center; 12,252	47–27
75	March 31; 6:30 pm	@ Oklahoma City	L 117–119	Jamal Crawford (32)	Cole Aldrich (10)	Jamal Crawford (7)	Chesapeake Energy Arena; 18,203	47–28

April : 6–1 (home: 4–0; road: 2–1)

Game	Date	Team	Score	High points	High rebounds	High assists	Location Attendance	Record
76	April 3; 12:30 pm	Washington	W 114–109	Chris Paul (27)	DeAndre Jordan (12)	Chris Paul (12)	Staples Center; 19,060	48–28
77	April 5; 7:30 pm	L.A. Lakers	W 103–81	Chris Paul (25)	DeAndre Jordan (14)	Chris Paul (8)	Staples Center; 19,537	49–28
78	April 6; 7:30 pm	@ L.A. Lakers	W 91–81	JJ Redick (15)	DeAndre Jordan (11)	Chris Paul (8)	Staples Center; 18,997	50–28
79	April 8; 6pm	@ Utah	W 102–99 (OT)	Cole Aldrich (21)	Cole Aldrich (18)	Pablo Prigioni (7)	Vivint Smart Home Arena; 19,911	51–28
80	April 10; 12:30 pm	Dallas	W 98–91	Jamal Crawford (22)	Blake Griffin (11)	Chris Paul (11)	Staples Center; 19,170	52–28
81	April 12; 7:30 pm	Memphis	W 110–84	Austin Rivers (14)	DeAndre Jordan (12)	Chris Paul (13)	Staples Center; 19,147	53–28
82	April 13; 7:30 pm	@ Phoenix	L 105–114	Wesley Johnson (19)	Cole Aldrich (10)	Pablo Prigioni (9)	Talking Stick Resort Arena; 18,055	53–29

2015–16 season schedule

== Playoffs ==
=== Game log ===
2016 playoff game log
Total: 2–4 (home: 2–1; road: 0–3)
First Round: 2–4 (home: 2–1; road: 0–3)

Game	Date	Team	Score	High points	High rebounds	High assists	Location Attendance	Series
1	April 17	Portland	W 115–95	Chris Paul (28)	Griffin, Jordan (12)	Chris Paul (11)	STAPLES Center; 19,122	1–0
2	April 20	Portland	W 102–81	Chris Paul (25)	DeAndre Jordan (18)	Jordan, Paul (5)	STAPLES Center; 19,127	2–0
3	April 23	@ Portland	L 88–96	Chris Paul (26)	DeAndre Jordan (16)	Chris Paul (9)	Moda Center; 19,761	2–1
4	April 25	@ Portland	L 84–98	Green, Griffin (17)	DeAndre Jordan (15)	Chris Paul (4)	Moda Center; 19,607	2–2
5	April 27	Portland	L 98–108	JJ Redick (19)	DeAndre Jordan (17)	Crawford, Prigioni (4)	STAPLES Center; 19,060	2–3
6	April 29	@ Portland	L 103–106	Jamal Crawford (32)	DeAndre Jordan (20)	Austin Rivers (8)	Moda Center; 19,768	2–4

2016 playoff schedule

== Player statistics ==
Legend
GP	Games played	GS	Games started	MPG	Minutes per game
FG%	Field-goal percentage	3P%	3-point field-goal percentage	FT%	Free-throw percentage
RPG	Rebounds per game	APG	Assists per game	SPG	Steals per game
BPG	Blocks per game	PPG	Points per game

=== Regular season ===
Player	GP	GS	MPG	FG%	3P%	FT%	RPG	APG	SPG	BPG	PPG
Wesley Johnson	80	9	20.8	.404	.333	.652	3.1	.6	1.1	.7	6.9
Jamal Crawford	79	5	26.9	.404	.340	.904	1.8	2.3	.7	.2	14.2
DeAndre Jordan	77	77	33.7	.703	.000	.430	13.8	1.2	.7	2.3	12.7
JJ Redick	75	75	28.0	.480	.475	.888	1.9	1.4	.6	.1	16.3
Luc Mbah a Moute	75	61	17.0	.454	.325	.526	2.3	.4	.6	.3	3.1
Chris Paul	74	74	32.7	.462	.371	.896	4.2	10.0	2.1	.2	19.5
Paul Pierce	68	38	18.1	.363	.310	.818	2.7	1.0	.5	.3	6.1
Austin Rivers	67	7	21.9	.438	.335	.681	1.9	1.5	.7	.1	8.9
Cole Aldrich	60	5	13.3	.596		.714	4.8	.8	.8	1.1	5.5
Pablo Prigioni	59	3	13.9	.374	.295	.875	1.9	2.2	.9	.0	2.5
Lance Stephenson^{†}	43	10	15.8	.494	.404	.700	2.5	1.4	.6	.1	4.7
Blake Griffin	35	35	33.4	.499	.333	.727	8.4	4.9	.8	.5	21.4
Josh Smith^{†}	32	1	14.3	.383	.310	.595	3.9	1.3	.6	1.1	5.7
Jeff Green^{†}	27	10	26.3	.427	.325	.615	3.4	1.5	.7	.8	10.9
C. J. Wilcox	23	0	7.3	.394	.391	.750	.5	.4	.4	.1	3.0
Jeff Ayres	17	0	6.3	.522	.000	1.000	1.3	.3	.0	.2	1.8
Branden Dawson	6	0	4.8	.400		1.000	.7	.0	.0	.2	.8
Alex Stepheson^{†}	4	0	3.0	1.000		.000	.5	.0	.0	.5	.5

=== Playoffs ===
Player	GP	GS	MPG	FG%	3P%	FT%	RPG	APG	SPG	BPG	PPG
DeAndre Jordan	6	6	33.0	.632		.373	16.3	1.8	1.2	2.7	11.7
JJ Redick	6	6	27.7	.430	.355	.667	2.0	.8	.2	.2	13.5
Austin Rivers	6	2	24.0	.426	.235	.667	2.7	2.7	.5	.0	10.3
Jamal Crawford	6	1	33.2	.379	.190	.880	2.2	2.2	1.7	.0	17.3
Jeff Green	6	1	26.5	.457	.400	.600	3.2	.7	1.0	.3	10.2
Cole Aldrich	6	0	12.8	.667		.500	5.0	.5	1.0	.5	3.8
Wesley Johnson	6	0	12.8	.357	.333	1.000	3.0	.3	.2	.7	2.7
Luc Mbah a Moute	5	5	15.6	.667		1.000	2.0	.2	.6	.0	1.8
Paul Pierce	5	1	10.8	.167	.200	.250	1.2	.2	.4	.0	1.2
Pablo Prigioni	5	0	5.2	.000	.000		.6	1.4	.0	.0	.0
Blake Griffin	4	4	31.8	.377	.500	.760	8.8	4.0	.8	.5	15.0
Chris Paul	4	4	31.3	.487	.300	1.000	4.0	7.3	2.3	.0	23.8
C. J. Wilcox	2	0	3.5	.000			.5	.5	.0	.0	.0
Jeff Ayres	2	0	1.0	1.000		1.000	.0	.0	.0	.0	1.5

- ^{†} Denotes player spent time with another team in the season. Stats reflect time with the Clippers only.

== Transactions ==
=== Trades ===
June 15, 2015	To Los Angeles Clippers Lance Stephenson	To Charlotte Hornets Matt Barnes Spencer Hawes
June 25, 2015	To Los Angeles Clippers Draft rights to Branden Dawson	To New Orleans Pelicans Cash considerations
January 22, 2016	To Los Angeles Clippers Draft rights to Maarty Leunen	To Houston Rockets Josh Smith Draft rights to Sergei Lishouk Cash considerations
February 18, 2016	To Los Angeles Clippers Jeff Green	To Memphis Grizzlies Lance Stephenson A future protected first-round draft pick

=== Free agents ===
==== Re-signed ====
Player	Signed	Contract
DeAndre Jordan	July 8, 2015	4-year contract worth $87 million
Austin Rivers	July 13, 2015	2-year contract worth $6.4 million

==== Additions ====
Player	Signed	Former team
Wesley Johnson	July 9, 2015	Los Angeles Lakers
Paul Pierce	July 10, 2015	Washington Wizards
Cole Aldrich	July 13, 2015	New York Knicks
Josh Smith	July 16, 2015	Houston Rockets
Pablo Prigioni	August 3, 2015	Houston Rockets
Luc Mbah a Moute	September 25, 2015	Philadelphia 76ers
Jeff Ayres	January 13, 2016 contract expired February 12 re-signed March 16	Idaho Stampede (NBDL); Los Angeles D-Fenders (NBDL)
Alex Stepheson	February 20, 2016	Iowa Energy (NBDL)

==== Subtractions ====
Player	Reason left	New team
Lester Hudson	Waived, July 15, 2015	Liaoning Flying Leopards (CBA)
Ekpe Udoh	Free Agency, July 28, 2015	Fenerbahçe Ülker (TBL)
Jordan Hamilton	Waived, August 1, 2015	BC Krasny Oktyabr (VTB United League)
Glen Davis	Free Agency, September 1, 2015	Power (BIG3)
Dahntay Jones	Free Agency, September 10, 2015	Brooklyn Nets
Hedo Türkoğlu	Retired, November 12, 2015	CEO (Turkish Basketball Federation)
Alex Stepheson	Contract Expired, March 12, 2016	Memphis Grizzlies
