= 2015–16 Memphis Grizzlies season =

- Head coach: Dave Joerger
- General manager: Chris Wallace
- Owners: Robert Pera
- Arena: FedExForum

Results
- Record: 42–40 (.512)
- Place: Division: 3rd (Southwest); Conference: 7th (Western)
- Playoff finish: First Round (lost to Spurs 0–4)
- Stats at Basketball Reference

Local media
- Television: Fox Sports Tennessee; Fox Sports Southeast
- Radio: WMFS-FM

The 2015–16 Memphis Grizzlies season was the 21st season of the franchise in the National Basketball Association (NBA). While the team was able to make the postseason, they were affected by several injuries and were swept by the San Antonio Spurs in the First Round, the team that also swept them in the First Round of the 2004 Playoffs and the Western Conference finals of the 2013 Playoffs.

Dave Joerger was fired immediately after the end of the series, hearing of his firing after a tearful press conference.

== Draft ==
Round	Pick	Player	Position	Nationality	School
1	25	Jarell Martin	PF	United States	LSU

== Roster ==
2015–16 Memphis Grizzlies roster
Players

Pos.	No.	Player	Height	Weight	DOB	From
SG	3	Jordan Adams	6 ft 5 in (1.96 m)	209 lb (95 kg)	1994–07–08	UCLA
SG	9	Tony Allen	6 ft 4 in (1.93 m)	213 lb (97 kg)	1982–01–11	Oklahoma State
C	7	Chris Andersen	6 ft 10 in (2.08 m)	245 lb (111 kg)	1978–07–07	Blinn
SF	22	Matt Barnes	6 ft 7 in (2.01 m)	226 lb (103 kg)	1980–03–09	UCLA
SF	15	Vince Carter	6 ft 6 in (1.98 m)	220 lb (100 kg)	1977–01–26	North Carolina
PG	11	Mike Conley Jr.	6 ft 1 in (1.85 m)	175 lb (79 kg)	1987–10–11	Ohio State
PG	8	Bryce Cotton	6 ft 1 in (1.85 m)	165 lb (75 kg)	1992–08–11	Providence
PG	4	Jordan Farmar	6 ft 2 in (1.88 m)	180 lb (82 kg)	1986–11–30	UCLA
C	33	Marc Gasol	7 ft 1 in (2.16 m)	255 lb (116 kg)	1985–01–29	Lausanne CS (TN)
PF	0	JaMychal Green	6 ft 8 in (2.03 m)	227 lb (103 kg)	1990–06–21	Alabama
SG	19	P. J. Hairston	6 ft 6 in (1.98 m)	230 lb (104 kg)	1992–12–24	North Carolina
PF	10	Jarell Martin	6 ft 9 in (2.06 m)	239 lb (108 kg)	1994–05–24	LSU
PG	14	Xavier Munford	6 ft 2 in (1.88 m)	180 lb (82 kg)	1992–06–01	Rhode Island
PF	50	Zach Randolph	6 ft 9 in (2.06 m)	260 lb (118 kg)	1981–07–16	Michigan State
SG	1	Lance Stephenson	6 ft 5 in (1.96 m)	230 lb (104 kg)	1990–09–05	Cincinnati
PF	34	Brandan Wright	6 ft 10 in (2.08 m)	210 lb (95 kg)	1987–10–05	North Carolina

Coaches
Head coach
- Dave Joerger
Assistant(s)
- Jeff Bzdelik
- Jason March
- Shawn Respert
- Bob Thornton
- Duane Ticknor
- Elston Turner
- John Townsend (player development)

Legend
- (DP) Unsigned draft pick
- (FA) Free agent
- (S) Suspended
- (DL) On assignment to D-League affiliate
- Injured

Roster
Updated: 2016–04–11

== Game log ==
=== Preseason ===
2015 pre-season game log
Total: 6–1 (home: 4–0; road: 2–1)
Pre-season: 6–1 (home: 4–0; road: 2–1)

Game	Date	Team	Score	High points	High rebounds	High assists	Location Attendance	Record
1	October 6	Houston	92–89	Russ Smith (12)	Marc Gasol (8)	JaMychal Green (3)	FedExForum; 12,826	1–0
2	October 8	Maccabi Haifa	97–84	Marc Gasol (23)	Brandan Wright (9)	Barnes, Gasol, Green, Udrih (3)	FedExForum; 12,171	2–0
3	October 12	@ Cleveland	91–81	Zach Randolph (14)	Courtney Lee (6)	Mike Conley Jr. (9)	Schottenstein Center; 18,073	3–0
4	October 16	Oklahoma City	94–78	Ryan Hollins (16)	Jarnell Stokes (10)	Green, Smith (4)	FedEx Forum; 14,996	4–0
5	October 18	Minnesota	90–68	Courtney Lee (18)	Marc Gasol (8)	Russ Smith (4)	FedExForum; 13,387	5–0
6	October 21	@ Atlanta	82–81	Zach Randolph (19)	Zach Randolph (13)	Mike Conley Jr. (5)	Philips Arena; 11,273	6–0
7	October 23	@ Orlando	76–86	Brandan Wright (11)	Stokes, Wright (9)	Jeff Green (4)	Amway Center; 12,155	6–1

2015–16 pre-season schedule

== Regular season game log ==
2015–16 game log
Total: 42–40 (home: 26–15; road: 16–25)
October: 2–1 (home: 1–1; road: 1–0)

Game	Date	Team	Score	High points	High rebounds	High assists	Location Attendance	Record
1	October 28	Cleveland	L 76–106	Gasol, Randolph (12)	Zach Randolph (8)	Mike Conley Jr. (6)	FedExForum; 18,119	0–1
2	October 29	@ Indiana	W 112–103	Marc Gasol (20)	Gasol, Randolph (8)	Mike Conley Jr. (10)	Bankers Life Fieldhouse; 18,165	1–1
3	October 31	Brooklyn	W 101–91	Mike Conley Jr. (22)	Zach Randolph (13)	Mike Conley Jr. (8)	FedExForum; 16,013	2–1

November : 8–7 (home: 5–2; road: 3–5)

Game	Date	Team	Score	High points	High rebounds	High assists	Location Attendance	Record
4	November 2	@ Golden State	L 69–119	Marc Gasol (13)	Marc Gasol (9)	Mike Conley Jr. (5)	Oracle Arena; 19,596	2–2
5	November 3	@ Sacramento	W 103–89	Zach Randolph (20)	Zach Randolph (11)	Mike Conley Jr. (6)	Sleep Train Arena; 17,317	3–2
6	November 5	@ Portland	L 96–115	Courtney Lee (18)	Zach Randolph (10)	Beno Udrih (6)	Moda Center; 19,393	3–3
7	November 7	@ Utah	L 79–89	Mike Conley Jr. (20)	Marc Gasol (10)	Marc Gasol (6)	Vivint Smart Home Arena; 19,456	3–4
8	November 9	@ L.A. Clippers	L 92–94	Zach Randolph (26)	Zach Randolph (9)	Conley, Jr., Lee (5)	Staples Center; 19,060	3–5
9	November 11	Golden State	L 84–100	Marc Gasol (26)	JaMychal Green (9)	Mike Conley Jr. (9)	FedExForum; 18,119	3–6
10	November 13	Portland	W 101–100	Marc Gasol (31)	Zach Randolph (8)	Mike Conley Jr. (9)	FedExForum; 18,119	4–6
11	November 15	@ Minnesota	W 114–106	Jeff Green (21)	Zach Randolph (8)	Mike Conley Jr. (7)	Target Center; 12,086	5–6
12	November 16	Oklahoma City	W 122–114	Mike Conley Jr. (22)	Zach Randolph (10)	Mike Conley Jr. (9)	FedExForum; 17,270	6–6
13	November 20	Houston	W 96–84	Mike Conley Jr. (26)	Marc Gasol (11)	Marc Gasol (11)	FedExForum; 17,555	7–6
14	November 21	@ San Antonio	L 82–92	Mike Conley Jr. (16)	Marc Gasol (8)	Marc Gasol (6)	AT&T Center; 18,418	7–7
15	November 24	Dallas	W 110–96	Mike Conley Jr. (21)	Marc Gasol (10)	Mike Conley Jr. (6)	FedExForum; 17,381	8–7
16	November 25	@ Houston	W 102–93	Jeff Green (20)	Gasol, Green (7)	Chalmers, Conley, Jr. (5)	Toyota Center; 18,143	9–7
17	November 27	Atlanta	L 101–116	Mike Conley Jr. (16)	Marc Gasol (8)	Mike Conley Jr. (9)	FedExForum; 17,684	9–8
18	November 29	Philadelphia	W 92–84	Mike Conley Jr. (20)	Marc Gasol (12)	Chalmers, Conley, Jr. (5)	FedExForum; 15,322	10–8

December : 8–8 (home: 6–3; road: 2–5)

Game	Date	Team	Score	High points	High rebounds	High assists	Location Attendance	Record
19	December 1	@ New Orleans	W 113–104	Marc Gasol (38)	Marc Gasol (13)	Marc Gasol (6)	Smoothie King Center; 16,020	11–8
20	December 3	San Antonio	L 83–103	Chalmers, Conley, Jr., Gasol (15)	Marc Gasol (8)	Mike Conley Jr. (4)	FedExForum; 17,013	11–9
21	December 6	Phoenix	W 95–93	Marc Gasol (22)	Zach Randolph (9)	Conley, Jr., Lee (6)	FedExForum; 16,022	12–9
22	December 8	Oklahoma City	L 88–125	Mario Chalmers (19)	Zach Randolph (10)	Mike Conley Jr. (6)	FedExForum; 16,415	12–10
23	December 9	@ Detroit	W 93–92	Zach Randolph (26)	Zach Randolph (16)	Mike Conley Jr. (8)	Palace of Auburn Hills; 13,411	13–10
24	December 11	Charlotte	L 99–123	Marc Gasol (17)	Marc Gasol (9)	Marc Gasol (5)	FedExForum; 17,111	13–11
25	December 13	@ Miami	L 97–100	Jeff Green (26)	Matt Barnes (13)	Barnes, Conley, Gasol, Randolph (4)	AmericanAirlines Arena; 19,813	13–12
26	December 14	Washington	W 112–95	Marc Gasol (24)	Marc Gasol (12)	Mike Conley Jr. (11)	FedExForum; 15,397	14–12
27	December 16	@ Chicago	L 85–98	Courtney Lee (18)	Zach Randolph (11)	Marc Gasol (7)	United Center; 21,032	14–13
28	December 18	@ Dallas	L 88–97	Mike Conley Jr. (20)	Gasol, Randolph (8)	Jeff Green (3)	American Airlines Center; 20,199	14–14
29	December 19	Indiana	W 96–84	Mike Conley Jr. (20)	Marc Gasol (12)	Jeff Green (8)	FedExForum; 18,119	15–14
30	December 22	@ Philadelphia	L 90–104	Marc Gasol (18)	Matt Barnes (10)	Mario Chalmers (7)	Wells Fargo Center; 15,552	16–14
31	December 23	@ Washington	L 91–100	Mike Conley Jr. (21)	Marc Gasol (12)	Jeff Green (4)	Verizon Center; 15,879	16–15
32	December 26	@ Charlotte	L 92–98	Mike Conley Jr. (19)	Zach Randolph (12)	Mike Conley Jr. (7)	Time Warner Cable Arena; 19,091	16–16
33	December 27	L. A. Lakers	W 112–96	Mike Conley Jr. (19)	Barnes, Green (8)	Mario Chalmers (7)	FedEx Forum; 18,119	17–16
34	December 29	Miami	W 99–90 (OT)	Marc Gasol (23)	Marc Gasol (8)	Marc Gasol (6)	FedEx Forum; 18,119	18–16

January : 10–4 (home: 8–1; road: 2–3)

Game	Date	Team	Score	High points	High rebounds	High assists	Location Attendance	Record
35	January 2	@ Utah	L 87–92 (OT)	Marc Gasol (20)	Jeff Green (10)	Conley, Jr., Gasol (4)	Vivint Smart Home Arena; 18,455	18–17
36	January 4	@ Portland	W 91–78	Zach Randolph (26)	Zach Randolph (18)	Mario Chalmers (6)	Moda Center; 18,832	19–17
37	January 6	@ Oklahoma City	L 94–112	Mario Chalmers (23)	Zach Randolph (8)	Mario Chalmers (9)	Chesapeake Energy Arena; 18,203	19–18
38	January 8	Denver	W 91–84	Zach Randolph (24)	Allen, Green (9)	Mario Chalmers (4)	FedExForum; 17,499	20–18
39	January 10	Boston	W 101–98	Zach Randolph (25)	Zach Randolph (13)	Mario Chalmers (4)	FedEx Forum; 17,112	21–18
40	January 12	Houston	L 91–107	Marc Gasol (20)	Zach Randolph (13)	Mario Chalmers (9)	FedEx Forum; 17,112	21–19
41	January 14	Detroit	W 103–101	Mario Chalmers (25)	Tony Allen (7)	Mario Chalmers (8)	FedEx Forum; 15,977	22–19
42	January 16	New York	W 103–95	Marc Gasol (37)	Tony Allen (9)	Mario Chalmers (8)	FedEx Forum; 18,119	23–19
43	January 18	New Orleans	W 101–99	Barnes, Gasol, Green, Lee (16)	Marc Gasol (10)	Mike Conley Jr. (10)	FedEx Forum; 18,119	24–19
44	January 21	@ Denver	W 102–101	Marc Gasol (27)	Zach Randolph (7)	Chalmers, Gasol (6)	Pepsi Center; 16,140	25–19
45	January 23	@ Minnesota	L 101–106	Mario Chalmers (19)	Mike Conley Jr. (7)	Mike Conley Jr. (6)	Target Center; 15,608	25–20
46	January 25	Orlando	W 108–102 (OT)	Jeff Green (30)	Zach Randolph (13)	Mike Conley Jr. (9)	FedEx Forum; 15,779	26–20
47	January 28	Milwaukee	W 103–83	Jeff Green (21)	Marc Gasol (8)	Mario Chalmers (10)	FedEx Forum; 15,244	27–20
48	January 30	Sacramento	W 121–117	Jeff Green (29)	Marc Gasol (6)	Mike Conley Jr. (7)	FedEx Forum; 18,119	28–20

February : 7–4 (home: 2–2; road: 5–2)

Game	Date	Team	Score	High points	High rebounds	High assists	Location Attendance	Record
49	February 1	@ New Orleans	W 110–95	Jeff Green (24)	Zach Randolph (12)	Mike Conley Jr. (10)	Smoothie King Center; 15,210	29–20
50	February 5	@ New York	W 91–85	Jeff Green (16)	Barnes, Gasol (7)	Mike Conley Jr. (9)	Madison Square Garden; 19,812	30–20
51	February 6	Dallas	L 110–114 (OT)	Marc Gasol (22)	Zach Randolph (14)	Mike Conley Jr. (7)	FedExForum; 18,119	30–21
52	February 8	Portland	L 106–112 (OT)	Mike Conley Jr. (27)	Zach Randolph (9)	Zach Randolph (4)	FedExForum; 15,892	30–22
53	February 10	@ Brooklyn	W 109–90	Mike Conley Jr. (20)	Allen, Chalmers (6)	Zach Randolph (6)	Barclays Center; 14,262	31–22
All-Star Break
54	February 19	Minnesota	W 109–104	Mike Conley Jr. (25)	Jeff Green (11)	Mike Conley Jr. (7)	FedExForum; 18,119	32–22
55	February 21	@ Toronto	L 85–98	Zach Randolph (18)	Matt Barnes (7)	Mike Conley Jr. (4)	Air Canada Centre; 19,800	32–23
56	February 24	L. A. Lakers	W 128–119	Matt Barnes (25)	Green, Randolph (9)	Mike Conley Jr. (8)	FedExForum; 18,119	33–23
57	February 26	@ L. A. Lakers	W 112–95	P.J. Hairston (21)	Zach Randolph (10)	Mike Conley Jr. (7)	Staples Center; 18,997	34–23
58	February 27	@ Phoenix	L 106–111	Conley, Jr., Randolph (19)	Chris Andersen (8)	Mike Conley Jr. (8)	Talking Stick Resort Arena; 17,101	34–24
59	February 29	@ Denver	W 103–96	Zach Randolph (22)	Zach Randolph (5)	Mike Conley Jr. (9)	Pepsi Center; 10,324	35–24

March : 6–10 (home: 4–4; road: 2–6)

Game	Date	Team	Score	High points	High rebounds	High assists	Location Attendance	Record
60	March 2	Sacramento	W 104–98	Mike Conley Jr. (24)	Martin, Randolph (8)	Mike Conley Jr. (5)	FedExForum; 15,310	36–24
61	March 4	Utah	W 94–88	Zach Randolph (25)	Chris Andersen (10)	Mario Chalmers (5)	FedExForum; 17,188	37–24
62	March 6	Phoenix	L 100–109	Mike Conley Jr. (22)	Zach Randolph (8)	Mike Conley Jr. (4)	FedExForum; 17,291	37–25
63	March 7	@ Cleveland	W 106–103	Tony Allen (26)	Zach Randolph (10)	Mario Chalmers (7)	Quicken Loans Arena; 20,562	38–25
64	March 9	@ Boston	L 96–116	Carter, Green (17)	JaMychal Green (13)	Mario Chalmers (5)	TD Garden; 17,790	38–26
65	March 11	New Orleans	W 121–114 (OT)	Matt Barnes (26)	Matt Barnes (11)	Matt Barnes (10)	FedExForum; 18,119	39–26
66	March 12	@ Atlanta	L 83–95	Lance Stephenson (18)	Tony Allen (9)	Lance Stephenson (6)	Philips Arena; 17,515	39–27
67	March 14	@ Houston	L 81–130	Jarell Martin (17)	Alex Stepheson (15)	Ray McCallum (4)	Toyota Center; 18,226	39–28
68	March 16	Minnesota	L 108–114	Lance Stephenson (24)	Lance Stephenson (11)	Lance Stephenson (7)	FedExForum; 16,588	39–29
69	March 17	@ Milwaukee	L 86–96	Matt Barnes (26)	Ryan Hollins (10)	Lance Stephenson (6)	BMO Harris Bradley Center; 11,740	39–30
70	March 19	L. A. Clippers	W 113–102	Zach Randolph (28)	Zach Randolph (11)	Zach Randolph (10)	FedExForum; 18,119	40–30
71	March 21	@ Phoenix	W 103–97	Lance Stephenson (16)	Zach Randolph (12)	Ray McCallum (7)	Talking Stick Resort Arena; 15,868	41–30
72	March 22	@ L. A. Lakers	L 100–107	Tony Allen (27)	Vince Carter (7)	Allen, Farmar, Randolph (5)	Staples Center; 18,997	41–31
73	March 25	@ San Antonio	L 104–110	JaMychal Green (20)	Chris Andersen (7)	Jordan Farmar (5)	AT&T Center; 18,418	41–32
74	March 28	San Antonio	L 87–101	Vince Carter (14)	Matt Barnes (9)	Ray McCallum (4)	FedExForum; 17,133	41–33
75	March 30	Denver	L 105–109	Zach Randolph (26)	JaMychal Green (12)	Jordan Farmar (5)	FedExForum; 16,401	41–34

April : 1–6 (home: 1–2; road: 0–4)

Game	Date	Team	Score	High points	High rebounds	High assists	Location Attendance	Record
76	April 1	Toronto	L 95–99	Zach Randolph (26)	JaMychal Green (7)	Lance Stephenson (4)	FedExForum; 17,077	41–35
77	April 3	@ Orlando	L 107–119	Matt Barnes (24)	JaMychal Green (10)	Zach Randolph (7)	Amway Center; 17,741	41–36
78	April 5	Chicago	W 108–92	Zach Randolph (27)	Zach Randolph (10)	Vince Carter (4)	FedExForum; 17,591	42–36
79	April 8	@ Dallas	L 93–103	Tony Allen (25)	Andersen, Barnes, Stephenson (7)	Allen, Barnes (5)	American Airlines Center; 20,211	42–37
80	April 9	Golden State	L 99–100	Matt Barnes (24)	Matt Barnes (15)	Vince Carter (4)	FedExForum; 19,257	42–38
81	April 12	@ L. A. Clippers	L 84–110	Zach Randolph (14)	JaMychal Green (10)	Xavier Munford (4)	Staples Center; 19,147	42–39
82	April 13	@ Golden State	L 104–125	Zach Randolph (24)	Matt Barnes (9)	Matt Barnes (6)	Oracle Arena; 19,596	42–40

2015–16 season schedule

== Standings ==
Southwest Division	W	L	PCT	GB	Home	Road	Div	GP
y – San Antonio Spurs	67	15	.817	–	40‍–‍1	27‍–‍14	15–1	82
x – Dallas Mavericks	42	40	.512	25.0	23‍–‍18	19‍–‍22	7–9	82
x – Memphis Grizzlies	42	40	.512	25.0	26‍–‍15	16‍–‍25	7–9	82
x – Houston Rockets	41	41	.500	26.0	23‍–‍18	18‍–‍23	8–8	82
e – New Orleans Pelicans	30	52	.366	37.0	21‍–‍20	9‍–‍32	4–12	82

=== By Conference ===
Western Conference
#	Team	W	L	PCT	GB	GP
1	z – Golden State Warriors *	73	9	.890	–	82
2	y – San Antonio Spurs *	67	15	.817	6.0	82
3	y – Oklahoma City Thunder *	55	27	.671	18.0	82
4	x – Los Angeles Clippers	53	29	.646	20.0	82
5	x – Portland Trail Blazers	44	38	.537	29.0	82
6	x – Dallas Mavericks	42	40	.512	31.0	82
7	x – Memphis Grizzlies	42	40	.512	31.0	82
8	x – Houston Rockets	41	41	.500	32.0	82
9	e – Utah Jazz	40	42	.488	33.0	82
10	e – Sacramento Kings	33	49	.402	40.0	82
11	e – Denver Nuggets	33	49	.402	40.0	82
12	e – New Orleans Pelicans	30	52	.366	43.0	82
13	e – Minnesota Timberwolves	29	53	.354	44.0	82
14	e – Phoenix Suns	23	59	.280	50.0	82
15	e – Los Angeles Lakers	17	65	.207	56.0	82

== Playoffs ==
=== Game log ===
2016 playoff game log
Total: 0–4 (home: 0–2; road: 0–2)
First Round: 0–4 (home: 0–2; road: 0–2)

Game	Date	Team	Score	High points	High rebounds	High assists	Location Attendance	Series
1	April 17	@ San Antonio	L 74–106	Vince Carter (16)	Chris Andersen (9)	Xavier Munford (4)	AT&T Center; 18,418	0–1
2	April 19	@ San Antonio	L 68–94	Tony Allen (12)	Zach Randolph (12)	Zach Randolph (3)	AT&T Center; 18,418	0–2
3	April 22	San Antonio	L 87–96	Zach Randolph (20)	Barnes, Randolph (11)	Jordan Farmar (6)	FedExForum; 18,119	0–3
4	April 24	San Antonio	L 95–116	Lance Stephenson (26)	Barnes, Randolph (7)	Jordan Farmar (5)	FedExForum; 18,119	0–4

2016 playoff schedule

== Player statistics ==
=== Regular season ===
Player	POS	GP	GS	MP	REB	AST	STL	BLK	PTS	MPG	RPG	APG	SPG	BPG	PPG
JaMychal Green	PF	78	15	1,446	373	67	46	33	578	18.5	4.8	.9	.6	.4	7.4
Matt Barnes	SF	76	45	2,190	420	163	78	57	758	28.8	5.5	2.1	1.0	.8	10.0
Zach Randolph	PF	68	53	2,016	529	142	43	13	1,040	29.6	7.8	2.1	.6	.2	15.3
Tony Allen	SG	64	57	1,620	296	70	110	18	535	25.3	4.6	1.1	1.7	.3	8.4
Vince Carter	SG	60	3	1,005	146	56	38	16	395	16.8	2.4	.9	.6	.3	6.6
Mike Conley Jr.	PG	56	56	1,761	164	342	67	16	857	31.4	2.9	6.1	1.2	.3	15.3
Mario Chalmers^{†}	PG	55	7	1,253	143	211	80	12	595	22.8	2.6	3.8	1.5	.2	10.8
Jeff Green^{†}	SF	53	31	1,544	241	98	40	19	646	29.1	4.5	1.8	.8	.4	12.2
Marc Gasol	C	52	52	1,791	362	196	50	70	861	34.4	7.0	3.8	1.0	1.3	16.6
Courtney Lee^{†}	SG	51	37	1,489	118	76	52	16	511	29.2	2.3	1.5	1.0	.3	10.0
Ryan Hollins^{†}	C	32	9	412	87	10	6	20	116	12.9	2.7	.3	.2	.6	3.6
Jarell Martin	PF	27	0	380	86	15	8	7	153	14.1	3.2	.6	.3	.3	5.7
Lance Stephenson^{†}	SF	26	3	692	115	73	19	6	369	26.6	4.4	2.8	.7	.2	14.2
Chris Andersen^{†}	C	20	14	366	89	9	14	10	92	18.3	4.5	.5	.7	.5	4.6
P. J. Hairston^{†}	SF	18	9	375	46	9	8	4	124	20.8	2.6	.5	.4	.2	6.9
Russ Smith	PG	15	0	66	9	11	5	1	23	4.4	.6	.7	.3	.1	1.5
Xavier Munford	SG	14	0	244	31	22	13	3	80	17.4	2.2	1.6	.9	.2	5.7
Jordan Farmar	PG	12	10	291	25	37	15	2	110	24.3	2.1	3.1	1.3	.2	9.2
Brandan Wright	PF	12	2	212	43	6	5	15	83	17.7	3.6	.5	.4	1.3	6.9
Ray McCallum Jr.^{†}	PG	10	3	219	16	27	7	3	69	21.9	1.6	2.7	.7	.3	6.9
James Ennis III^{†}	SF	10	0	40	7	2	4	2	16	4.0	.7	.2	.4	.2	1.6
Beno Udrih^{†}	PG	8	0	120	9	26	3	1	47	15.0	1.1	3.3	.4	.1	5.9
Brianté Weber^{†}	PG	6	4	166	24	20	9	3	29	27.7	4.0	3.3	1.5	.5	4.8
Elliot Williams	PG	5	0	45	4	4	0	0	8	9.0	.8	.8	.0	.0	1.6
Bryce Cotton^{†}	PG	5	0	6	0	0	0	0	4	1.2	.0	.0	.0	.0	.8
Alex Stepheson^{†}	PF	4	0	61	26	2	1	3	20	15.3	6.5	.5	.3	.8	5.0
Jordan Adams	SG	2	0	15	2	3	3	0	7	7.5	1.0	1.5	1.5	.0	3.5
Jarnell Stokes^{†}	C	2	0	4	2	0	0	0	0	2.0	1.0	.0	.0	.0	.0

- ^{†} Denotes player spent time with another team in the season. Stats reflect time with the Grizzlies only.

=== Playoffs ===
Player	POS	GP	GS	MP	REB	AST	STL	BLK	PTS	MPG	RPG	APG	SPG	BPG	PPG
Matt Barnes	SF	4	4	139	29	11	4	1	43	34.8	7.3	2.8	1.0	.3	10.8
Zach Randolph	PF	4	4	120	35	7	1	0	52	30.0	8.8	1.8	.3	.0	13.0
Jordan Farmar	PG	4	4	113	6	16	3	1	27	28.3	1.5	4.0	.8	.3	6.8
Vince Carter	SG	4	4	91	15	5	2	1	45	22.8	3.8	1.3	.5	.3	11.3
Tony Allen	SG	4	2	94	11	3	5	2	30	23.5	2.8	.8	1.3	.5	7.5
Chris Andersen	C	4	2	79	31	3	2	3	15	19.8	7.8	.8	.5	.8	3.8
Lance Stephenson	SF	4	0	95	6	7	1	0	52	23.8	1.5	1.8	.3	.0	13.0
Xavier Munford	SG	4	0	89	9	10	6	3	19	22.3	2.3	2.5	1.5	.8	4.8
JaMychal Green	PF	4	0	72	15	3	3	5	27	18.0	3.8	.8	.8	1.3	6.8
Jarell Martin	PF	2	0	46	7	1	3	0	9	23.0	3.5	.5	1.5	.0	4.5
P. J. Hairston	SF	2	0	22	0	0	1	0	5	11.0	.0	.0	.5	.0	2.5
