= 2015–16 Milwaukee Bucks season =

NBA professional basketball team season

- Head coach: Jason Kidd
- General manager: John Hammond
- Owners: Wesley Edens & Marc Lasry
- Arena: Bradley Center

Results
- Record: 33–49 (.402)
- Place: Division: 5th (Central); Conference: 12th (Eastern)
- Playoff finish: Did not qualify
- Stats at Basketball Reference

Local media
- Television: Fox Sports Wisconsin
- Radio: WTMJ (AM)

The 2015–16 Milwaukee Bucks season was the 48th season of the franchise in the National Basketball Association (NBA). On December 12, 2015, the team ended the Golden State Warriors' 28-game winning streak including their NBA record-setting 24–0 start.

Until 2026, was the last season the Bucks missed the playoffs and finished with a losing record.

== Draft picks ==
Round	Pick	Player	Position	Nationality	College
1	17	Rashad Vaughn	SG	United States	UNLV
2	46	Norman Powell	G	United States	UCLA

== Roster ==
2015–16 Milwaukee Bucks roster
Players

Pos.	No.	Player	Height	Weight	DOB	From
SF	34	Giannis Antetokounmpo	6 ft 11 in (2.11 m)	222 lb (101 kg)	1994–12–06	Greece
PG	19	Jerryd Bayless	6 ft 3 in (1.91 m)	200 lb (91 kg)	1988–08–20	Arizona
SG	5	Michael Carter-Williams	6 ft 6 in (1.98 m)	190 lb (86 kg)	1991–10–10	Syracuse
PG	11	Tyler Ennis	6 ft 3 in (1.91 m)	194 lb (88 kg)	1994–08–24	Syracuse
PF	31	John Henson	6 ft 11 in (2.11 m)	229 lb (104 kg)	1990–12–28	North Carolina
SF	17	Damien Inglis	6 ft 9 in (2.06 m)	246 lb (112 kg)	1995–05–20	INSEP
SG	3	O. J. Mayo	6 ft 5 in (1.96 m)	210 lb (95 kg)	1987–11–05	USC
SG	22	Khris Middleton	6 ft 8 in (2.03 m)	234 lb (106 kg)	1991–08–12	Texas A&M
C	15	Greg Monroe	6 ft 11 in (2.11 m)	265 lb (120 kg)	1990–06–04	Georgetown
PF	6	Steve Novak	6 ft 10 in (2.08 m)	225 lb (102 kg)	1983–06–13	Marquette
PF	77	Johnny O'Bryant III	6 ft 9 in (2.06 m)	257 lb (117 kg)	1993–06–01	LSU
SF	12	Jabari Parker	6 ft 8 in (2.03 m)	250 lb (113 kg)	1995–03–15	Duke
C	18	Miles Plumlee	6 ft 11 in (2.11 m)	249 lb (113 kg)	1988–09–01	Duke
SG	21	Greivis Vásquez	6 ft 6 in (1.98 m)	217 lb (98 kg)	1987–01–16	Maryland
SG	20	Rashad Vaughn	6 ft 6 in (1.98 m)	202 lb (92 kg)	1996–08–16	UNLV

Coaches
Head coach
- Jason Kidd
Assistant(s)
- Greg Foster
- Eric Hughes
- Josh Oppenheimer
- Joe Prunty
- Sean Sweeney

Legend
- (DP) Unsigned draft pick
- (FA) Free agent
- (S) Suspended
- (DL) On assignment to D-League affiliate
- Injured

Roster
Updated: 2016–03–26

== Game log ==
=== Preseason ===
2015 pre-season game log
Total: 2–4 (Home: 1–2; Road: 1–2)
Pre-season: 2–4 (home: 1–2; road: 1–2)

Game	Date	Team	Score	High points	High rebounds	High assists	Location Attendance	Record
1	October 6	@ Chicago	L 95–105	Rashad Vaughn (20)	Damien Inglis (9)	Jorge Gutiérrez (7)	United Center; 21,199	0–1
2	October 10	Detroit	L 88–117	Greg Monroe (18)	Greg Monroe (8)	Gutiérrez, Vásquez (3)	BMO Harris Bradley Center; 7,350	0–2
3	October 13	@ Cleveland	W 110–101	Monroe & Vaughn (19)	Greg Monroe (13)	O. J. Mayo (10)	Quicken Loans Arena; 18,624	1–2
4	October 17	Washington	L 101–105	Khris Middleton (21)	John Henson (13)	Vásquez, Mayo, Carter-Williams (5)	BMO Harris Bradley Center; 4,716	1–3
5	October 20	Minnesota	W 106–88	Khris Middleton (17)	Greg Monroe (12)	Vásquez, Carter-Williams (5)	Kohl Center; 12,381	2–3
6	October 23	@ Minnesota	L 108–112	Giannis Antetokounmpo (23)	Giannis Antetokounmpo (7)	Jerryd Bayless (4)	Target Center; 10,101	2–4

2015–16 season schedule

Central Division	W	L	PCT	GB	Home	Road	Div	GP
c – Cleveland Cavaliers	57	25	.695	–	33‍–‍8	24‍–‍17	8–8	82
x – Indiana Pacers	45	37	.549	12.0	26‍–‍15	19‍–‍22	8–8	82
x – Detroit Pistons	44	38	.537	13.0	26‍–‍15	18‍–‍23	10–6	82
e – Chicago Bulls	42	40	.512	15.0	26‍–‍15	16‍–‍25	10–6	82
e – Milwaukee Bucks	33	49	.402	24.0	23‍–‍18	10‍–‍31	4–12	82

Eastern Conference
#	Team	W	L	PCT	GB	GP
1	c – Cleveland Cavaliers *	57	25	.695	–	82
2	y – Toronto Raptors *	56	26	.683	1.0	82
3	y – Miami Heat *	48	34	.585	9.0	82
4	x – Atlanta Hawks	48	34	.585	9.0	82
5	x – Boston Celtics	48	34	.585	9.0	82
6	x – Charlotte Hornets	48	34	.585	9.0	82
7	x – Indiana Pacers	45	37	.549	12.0	82
8	x – Detroit Pistons	44	38	.537	13.0	82
9	e – Chicago Bulls	42	40	.512	15.0	82
10	e – Washington Wizards	41	41	.500	16.0	82
11	e – Orlando Magic	35	47	.427	22.0	82
12	e – Milwaukee Bucks	33	49	.402	24.0	82
13	e – New York Knicks	32	50	.390	25.0	82
14	e – Brooklyn Nets	21	61	.256	36.0	82
15	e – Philadelphia 76ers	10	72	.122	47.0	82

== Regular season game log ==
2015–16 game log
Total: 33–49 (Home: 23–18; Road:10–31)
October: 0–2 (home: 0–2; road: 0–0)

Game	Date	Team	Score	High points	High rebounds	High assists	Location Attendance	Record
1	October 28	New York	L 97–122	Greg Monroe (22)	Greg Monroe (14)	Greivis Vásquez (5)	BMO Harris Bradley Center; 18,717	0–1
2	October 30	Washington	L 113–118	Giannis Antetokounmpo (27)	Giannis Antetokounmpo (9)	Michael Carter-Williams (11)	BMO Harris Bradley Center; 13,858	0–2

November : 7–9 (home: 5–2; road: 2–7)

Game	Date	Team	Score	High points	High rebounds	High assists	Location Attendance	Record
3	November 1	@ Toronto	L 87–106	Giannis Antetokounmpo (20)	Giannis Antetokounmpo (9)	Michael Carter-Williams (7)	Air Canada Centre; 19,800	0–3
4	November 2	@ Brooklyn	W 103–96	Jerryd Bayless (26)	Greg Monroe (13)	Michael Carter-Williams (5)	Barclays Center; 12,576	1–3
5	November 4	Philadelphia	W 91–87	Khris Middleton (21)	Greg Monroe (8)	Greivis Vásquez (5)	BMO Harris Bradley Center; 12,437	2–3
6	November 6	@ New York	W 99–92	Giannis Antetokounmpo (20)	Antetokounmpo, Monroe (7)	Greivis Vásquez (5)	Madison Square Garden; 19,812	3–3
7	November 7	Brooklyn	W 94–86	Greg Monroe (20)	Khris Middleton (9)	Jerryd Bayless (10)	BMO Harris Bradley Center; 15,228	4–3
8	November 10	Boston	L 83–99	Greg Monroe (17)	Greg Monroe (14)	Greg Monroe (4)	BMO Harris Bradley Center; 11,822	4–4
9	November 11	@ Denver	L 102–103	Jerryd Bayless (22)	Greg Monroe (10)	Greivis Vásquez (9)	Pepsi Center; 9,403	4–5
10	November 14	Cleveland	W 108–105 (2OT)	Bayless, Carter-Williams (17)	Greg Monroe (17)	Jerryd Bayless (5)	BMO Harris Bradley Center; 18,717	5–5
11	November 17	@ Washington	L 86–115	Khris Middleton (14)	Bayless, Henson (6)	Giannis Antetokounmpo (7)	Verizon Center; 15,485	5–6
12	November 19	@ Cleveland	L 100–115	Giannis Antetokounmpo (33)	Greg Monroe (8)	Vásquez, Carter-Williams (5)	Quicken Loans Arena; 20,562	5–7
13	November 21	@ Indiana	L 86–123	Greg Monroe (10)	Greg Monroe (14)	Monroe, Carter-Williams, Vásquez (3)	Bankers Life Fieldhouse; 17,137	5–8
14	November 23	Detroit	W 109–88	Greg Monroe (20)	Greg Monroe (13)	Michael Carter-Williams (8)	BMO Harris Bradley Center; 12,319	6–8
15	November 25	Sacramento	L 118–129	Antetokounmpo, Middleton (21)	John Henson (11)	Greivis Vásquez (7)	BMO Harris Bradley Center; 14,120	6–9
16	November 27	@ Orlando	L 90–114	Antetokounmpo, Bayless (17)	Greg Monroe (8)	Mayo, Middleton (4)	Amway Center; 16,317	6–10
17	November 29	@ Charlotte	L 82–87	Khris Middleton (19)	Greg Monroe (10)	Bayless, Middleton (6)	Time Warner Cable Arena; 14,224	6–11
18	November 30	Denver	W 92–74	Greg Monroe (18)	John Henson (7)	Michael Carter-Williams (9)	BMO Harris Bradley Center; 10,187	7–11

December : 6–10 (home: 4–2; road: 2–8)

Game	Date	Team	Score	High points	High rebounds	High assists	Location Attendance	Record
19	December 2	@ San Antonio	L 70–95	Khris Middleton (19)	Monroe, Parker (7)	Michael Carter-Williams (4)	AT&T Center; 18,418	7–12
20	December 4	@ Detroit	L 95–102	Khris Middleton (21)	Greg Monroe (13)	Bayless, Carter-Williams (5)	The Palace of Auburn Hills; 16,963	7–13
21	December 5	New York	W 106–91	Michael Carter-Williams (20)	Greg Monroe (14)	Giannis Antetokounmpo (6)	BMO Harris Bradley Center; 16,223	8–13
22	December 7	Portland	W 90–88	Giannis Antetokounmpo (17)	Greg Monroe (12)	Michael Carter-Williams (7)	BMO Harris Bradley Center; 14,389	9–13
23	December 9	L. A. Clippers	L 95–109	Michael Carter-Williams (20)	Greg Monroe (10)	Michael Carter-Williams (11)	BMO Harris Bradley Center; 14,224	9–14
24	December 11	@ Toronto	L 83–90	Khris Middleton (26)	Middleton, Monroe (7)	Michael Carter-Williams (6)	Air Canada Centre; 19,800	9–15
25	December 12	Golden State	W 108–95	Greg Monroe (28)	Giannis Antetokounmpo (12)	Giannis Antetokounmpo (10)	BMO Harris Bradley Center; 18,717	10–15
26	December 15	@ L. A. Lakers	L 95–113	Michael Carter-Williams (19)	Miles Plumlee (8)	Antetokounmpo, Carter-Williams (5)	Staples Center; 18,997	10–16
27	December 16	@ L. A. Clippers	L 90–103	Mayo, Carter-Williams (17)	Giannis Antetokounmpo (11)	Mayo, Middleton (6)	Staples Center; 19,060	10–17
28	December 18	@ Golden State	L 112–121	Michael Carter-Williams (24)	Greg Monroe (13)	Greg Monroe (7)	Oracle Arena; 19,596	10–18
29	December 20	@ Phoenix	W 101–95	Michael Carter-Williams (20)	Michael Carter-Williams (9)	Khris Middleton (7)	Talking Stick Resort Arena; 16,859	11–18
30	December 23	Philadelphia	W 113–100	Giannis Antetokounmpo (22)	Greg Monroe (6)	Michael Carter-Williams (9)	BMO Harris Bradley Center; 15,754	12–18
31	December 26	Toronto	L 90–111	Khris Middleton (20)	Greg Monroe (11)	Khris Middleton (7)	BMO Harris Bradley Center; 16,329	12–19
32	December 28	@ Dallas	L 93–103	Jerryd Bayless (19)	Greg Monroe (11)	Jerryd Bayless (7)	American Airlines Center; 20,300	12–20
33	December 29	@ Oklahoma City	L 123–131	Khris Middleton (36)	Antetokounmpo, Monroe (10)	Michael Carter-Williams (9)	Chesapeake Energy Arena; 18,203	12–21
34	December 31	@ Indiana	W 120–116	Khris Middleton (33)	Michael Carter-Williams (7)	Michael Carter-Williams (8)	Bankers Life Fieldhouse; 16,348	13–21

January : 7–8 (home: 4–5; road: 3–3)

Game	Date	Team	Score	High points	High rebounds	High assists	Location Attendance	Record
35	January 2	@ Minnesota	W 95–85	Greg Monroe (19)	Greg Monroe (10)	Michael Carter-Williams (6)	Target Center; 14,107	14–21
36	January 4	San Antonio	L 98–123	Khris Middleton (19)	Monroe, Parker (8)	Michael Carter-Williams (6)	BMO Harris Bradley Center; 18,418	14–22
37	January 5	@ Chicago	L 106–117	Khris Middleton (26)	Greg Monroe (12)	Michael Carter-Williams (12)	United Center; 21,686	14–23
38	January 8	Dallas	W 96–95	Khris Middleton (27)	Monroe, Carter-Williams (12)	Michael Carter-Williams (12)	BMO Harris Bradley Center; 16,409	15–23
39	January 10	@ New York	L 88–100	Greg Monroe (28)	Antetokounmpo, Monroe (10)	Michael Carter-Williams (6)	Madison Square Garden; 19,812	15–24
40	January 12	Chicago	W 106–101	Greg Monroe (28)	Antetokounmpo, Monroe (10)	Michael Carter-Williams (6)	BMO Harris Bradley Center; 16,867	16–24
41	January 13	@ Washington	L 101–106	Khris Middleton (25)	Greg Monroe (12)	Antetokounmpo, Carter-Williams (6)	Verizon Center; 16,248	16–25
42	January 15	Atlanta	W 108–101 (OT)	Giannis Antetokounmpo (28)	Giannis Antetokounmpo (16)	Michael Carter-Williams (7)	BMO Harris Bradley Center; 15,144	17–25
43	January 16	@ Charlotte	W 105–92	Khris Middleton (24)	Giannis Antetokounmpo (11)	Jerryd Bayless (6)	Time Warner Cable Arena; 18,288	18–25
44	January 19	@ Miami	W 91–79	Khris Middleton (22)	Greg Monroe (10)	Khris Middleton (7)	American Airlines Arena; 19,886	19–25
45	January 22	@ Houston	L 98–102	Middleton, Monroe (21)	Michael Carter-Williams (12)	Khris Middleton (7)	Toyota Center; 17,196	19–26
46	January 23	@ New Orleans	L 99–116	Middleton, Monroe (22)	Greg Monroe (11)	Middleton, Carter-Williams (5)	Smoothie King Center; 16,980	19–27
47	January 26	Orlando	W 107–100	Antetokounmpo, Middleton (25)	Greg Monroe (11)	Khris Middleton (7)	BMO Harris Bradley Center; 11,884	20–27
48	January 28	@ Memphis	L 83–103	Greg Monroe (21)	Jabari Parker (8)	Khris Middleton (6)	FedExForum; 15,244	20–28
49	January 29	Miami	L 103–107	Giannis Antetokounmpo (28)	Michael Carter-Williams (8)	Antetokounmpo, Carter-Williams (6)	BMO Harris Bradley Center; 17,846	20–29

February : 5–6 (home: 4–2; road: 1–4)

Game	Date	Team	Score	High points	High rebounds	High assists	Location Attendance	Record
50	February 1	@ Sacramento	L 104–111	Greg Monroe (24)	Greg Monroe (12)	Michael Carter-Williams (13)	Sleep Train Arena; 16,827	20–30
51	February 2	@ Portland	L 95–107	Khris Middleton (21)	Antetokounmpo, Middleton, Monroe (8)	Antetokounmpo, Bayless (5)	Moda Center; 18,306	20–31
52	February 5	@ Utah	L 81–84	Khris Middleton (18)	Greg Monroe (9)	Michael Carter-Williams (4)	Vivint Smart Home Arena; 19,911	20–32
53	February 9	Boston	W 112–111	Greg Monroe (29)	Greg Monroe (12)	O. J. Mayo (6)	BMO Harris Bradley Center; 13,215	21–32
54	February 11	Washington	W 99–92	Khris Middleton (26)	Giannis Antetokounmpo (13)	Khris Middleton (9)	BMO Harris Bradley Center; 14,172	22–32
All-Star Break
55	February 19	Charlotte	L 95–98	Jabari Parker (23)	Giannis Antetokounmpo (11)	Khris Middleton (7)	BMO Harris Bradley Center; 16,370	22–33
56	February 20	@ Atlanta	W 117–109 (2OT)	Jabari Parker (28)	Jabari Parker (13)	O. J. Mayo (6)	Philips Arena; 18,653	23–33
57	February 22	L. A. Lakers	W 108–101	Giannis Antetokounmpo (27)	Giannis Antetokounmpo (10)	Giannis Antetokounmpo (12)	BMO Harris Bradley Center; 18,717	24–33
58	February 25	@ Boston	L 107–112	Jabari Parker (22)	Greg Monroe (8)	Giannis Antetokounmpo (8)	TD Garden; 18,157	24–34
59	February 27	Detroit	L 91–102	Khris Middleton (26)	Giannis Antetokounmpo (12)	Giannis Antetokounmpo (7)	BMO Harris Bradley Center; 17,165	24–35
60	February 29	Houston	W 128–121	Jabari Parker (36)	Giannis Antetokounmpo (17)	Giannis Antetokounmpo (11)	BMO Harris Bradley Center; 13,214	25–35

March : 6–9 (home: 5–5; road: 1–4)

Game	Date	Team	Score	High points	High rebounds	High assists	Location Attendance	Record
61	March 2	Indiana	L 99–104	Khris Middleton (23)	Greg Monroe (7)	Jerryd Bayless (5)	BMO Harris Bradley Center; 14,263	25–36
62	March 4	Minnesota	W 116–101	Khris Middleton (32)	Giannis Antetokounmpo (9)	Giannis Antetokounmpo (12)	BMO Harris Bradley Center; 16,366	26–36
63	March 6	Oklahoma City	L 96–104	Antetokounmpo, Parker (26)	Giannis Antetokounmpo (12)	Giannis Antetokounmpo (10)	BMO Harris Bradley Center; 16,565	26–37
64	March 7	@ Chicago	L 90–100	Jerryd Bayless (20)	Jabari Parker (11)	Giannis Antetokounmpo (10)	United Center; 21,672	26–38
65	March 9	Miami	W 114–108	Giannis Antetokounmpo (24)	Greg Monroe (8)	Khris Middleton (8)	BMO Harris Bradley Center; 15,005	27–38
66	March 12	New Orleans	W 103–92	Khris Middleton (19)	Greg Monroe (11)	Khris Middleton (8)	BMO Harris Bradley Center; 16,518	28–38
67	March 13	@ Brooklyn	W 109–100	Giannis Antetokounmpo (28)	Giannis Antetokounmpo (11)	Giannis Antetokounmpo (14)	Barclays Center; 15,241	29–38
68	March 15	Toronto	L 89–107	Antetokounmpo, Parker (18)	Giannis Antetokounmpo (12)	Giannis Antetokounmpo (9)	BMO Harris Bradley Center; 13,522	29–39
69	March 17	Memphis	W 96–86	Giannis Antetokounmpo (15)	Greg Monroe (10)	Giannis Antetokounmpo (11)	BMO Harris Bradley Center; 11,740	30–39
70	March 20	Utah	L 85–94	Jabari Parker (19)	Jabari Parker (8)	Giannis Antetokounmpo (7)	BMO Harris Bradley Center; 14,124	30–40
71	March 21	@ Detroit	L 91–92	Khris Middleton (27)	Giannis Antetokounmpo (12)	Jerryd Bayless (6)	The Palace of Auburn Hills; 13,577	30–41
72	March 23	@ Cleveland	L 104–113	Giannis Antetokounmpo (24)	Giannis Antetokounmpo (6)	Khris Middleton (11)	Quicken Loans Arena; 20,562	30–42
73	March 25	@ Atlanta	L 90–101	Jabari Parker (19)	John Henson (10)	Giannis Antetokounmpo (4)	Philips Arena; 17,070	30–43
74	March 26	Charlotte	L 91–115	John Henson (19)	John Henson (8)	Tyler Ennis (12)	BMO Harris Bradley Center; 15,544	30–44
75	March 30	Phoenix	W 105–94	Khris Middleton (26)	Khris Middleton (7)	Giannis Antetokounmpo (6)	BMO Harris Bradley Center; 15,733	31–44

April : 2–5 (home: 1–3; road: 1–2)

Game	Date	Team	Score	High points	High rebounds	High assists	Location Attendance	Record
76	April 1	Orlando	W 113–110	Jabari Parker (26)	Giannis Antetokounmpo (11)	Giannis Antetokounmpo (11)	BMO Harris Bradley Center; 16,268	32–44
77	April 3	Chicago	L 98–102	Giannis Antetokounmpo (34)	Jabari Parker (11)	Giannis Antetokounmpo (9)	BMO Harris Bradley Center; 15,768	32–45
78	April 5	Cleveland	L 80–109	Giannis Antetokounmpo (22)	Giannis Antetokounmpo (14)	Giannis Antetokounmpo (8)	BMO Harris Bradley Center; 15,061	32–46
79	April 8	@ Boston	L 109–124	Giannis Antetokounmpo (27)	Greg Monroe (8)	Tyler Ennis (11)	TD Garden; 18,624	32–47
80	April 10	@ Philadelphia	W 109–108 (OT)	Khris Middleton (36)	John Henson (10)	Khris Middleton (9)	Wells Fargo Center; 16,267	33–47
81	April 11	@ Orlando	L 98–107	Greg Monroe (23)	Miles Plumlee (13)	Khris Middleton (7)	Amway Center; 18,374	33–48
82	April 13	Indiana	L 92–97	Giannis Antetokounmpo (19)	Giannis Antetokounmpo (9)	Giannis Antetokounmpo (5)	BMO Harris Bradley Center; 16,569	33–49

2015–16 season schedule

== Playoffs ==
The Bucks missed the playoffs for the third time in four years. This would be the last time Milwaukee missed the playoffs until 2026.

== Player statistics ==
Legend
GP	Games played	GS	Games started	MPG	Minutes per game
FG%	Field-goal percentage	3P%	3-point field-goal percentage	FT%	Free-throw percentage
RPG	Rebounds per game	APG	Assists per game	SPG	Steals per game
BPG	Blocks per game	PPG	Points per game

=== Regular season ===
Milwaukee Bucks statistics
Player	GP	GS	MPG	FG%	3P%	FT%	RPG	APG	SPG	BPG	PPG
Giannis Antetokounmpo	80	79	35.3	.506	.257	.724	7.7	4.3	1.2	1.4	16.9
Khris Middleton	79	79	36.1	.444	.396	.888	3.8	4.2	1.7	.2	18.2
Greg Monroe	79	67	29.3	.522	.000	.740	8.8	2.3	.9	.8	15.3
Jabari Parker	76	72	31.7	.493	.257	.768	5.2	1.7	.9	.4	14.1
Rashad Vaughn	70	6	14.3	.305	.293	.800	1.3	.6	.4	.2	3.1
Johnny O'Bryant III	66	4	13.0	.411	1.000	.675	2.7	.5	.3	.1	3.0
Miles Plumlee	61	14	14.3	.601		.576	3.8	.3	.3	.8	5.1
John Henson	57	1	16.8	.564	.000	.590	3.9	.9	.3	1.9	7.0
Michael Carter-Williams	54	37	30.5	.452	.273	.654	5.1	5.2	1.5	.8	11.5
Jerryd Bayless	52	18	28.9	.423	.437	.778	2.7	3.1	.9	.2	10.4
Tyler Ennis	46	7	14.2	.449	.333	.735	1.6	2.1	.5	.0	4.5
O. J. Mayo	41	24	26.6	.371	.321	.775	2.6	2.9	1.2	.2	7.8
Chris Copeland	24	1	6.5	.333	.278	.857	.4	.5	.1	.0	2.1
Greivis Vásquez	23	0	20.0	.326	.247	.846	2.0	4.0	.4	.0	5.7
Damien Inglis	20	1	7.8	.351	.231	.875	1.6	.5	.3	.2	1.8
Jared Cunningham^{†}	4	0	13.8	.286	.286	.857	2.3	.3	.5	.0	4.0
Steve Novak^{†}	3	0	6.7	.333	.333	1.000	.3	.0	.0	.0	2.3

- ^{†} Denotes player spent time with another team in the season. Stats reflect time with the Bucks only.

== Transactions ==
=== Overview ===
Players Added

Via draft

- Rashad Vaughn

Via trade

- Greivis Vásquez

Via free agency

- Greg Monroe
- Steve Novak
Players Lost

Via trade

- Jared Dudley
- Ersan Ilyasova
- Zaza Pachulia

Via free agency

- Chris Copeland

Waived

- Jorge Gutiérrez

=== Trades ===
June 11, 2015	To Milwaukee Bucks Caron Butler; Shawne Williams	To Detroit Pistons Ersan İlyasova
June 25, 2015	To Milwaukee Bucks Greivis Vásquez	To Toronto Raptors 2017 first-round pick Norman Powell
July 9, 2015	To Milwaukee Bucks Future second-round draft pick	To Dallas Mavericks Zaza Pachulia
July 9, 2015	To Milwaukee Bucks Protected future second-round draft pick	To Washington Wizards Jared Dudley

=== Free agents ===
Player	Signed	Former team
Greg Monroe	July 9, 2015	Detroit Pistons
Chris Copeland	July 29, 2016	Indiana Pacers
Marcus Landry	August 17, 2015	(Spain) CAI Zaragoza
Steve Novak	February 21, 2016	Oklahoma City Thunder
