= 2015–16 Toronto Raptors season =

NBA professional basketball team season

- Division champions
- Head coach: Dwane Casey
- General manager: Masai Ujiri
- Owners: Maple Leaf Sports & Entertainment
- Arena: Air Canada Centre

Results
- Record: 56–26 (.683)
- Place: Division: 1st (Atlantic); Conference: 2nd (Eastern)
- Playoff finish: Eastern Conference Finals (lost to Cavaliers 2–4)
- Stats at Basketball Reference

Local media
- Television: TSN, Sportsnet

The 2015–16 Toronto Raptors season was the 21st season of the franchise in the National Basketball Association (NBA). This season marked the Raptors' first 50-win season since their inception in the league, a franchise-best, besting their record (49–33) of the previous season. On May 1, 2016, the Raptors defeated the Indiana Pacers in Game 7 of the first round of the NBA playoffs. This was the second playoff victory in Raptors franchise history, and the first in a seven-game series. They returned to the semifinals for the first time since 2001. In the semifinals, the Raptors survived the third-seeded Miami Heat in a tough seven-game series, marking the first time the team advanced to the Eastern Conference finals. However, they lost to the Cleveland Cavaliers, the eventual NBA champions, in six games.

== Draft ==
Round	Pick	Player	Position	Nationality	College/Club team
1	20	Delon Wright	PG	United States	Utah
2	46	Norman Powell	SG	United States	UCLA

== Roster ==
2015–16 Toronto Raptors roster
Players

Pos.	No.	Player	Height	Weight	DOB	From
C	8	Bismack Biyombo	6 ft 9 in (2.06 m)	245 lb (111 kg)	1992–08–28	DR Congo
F	20	Bruno Caboclo	6 ft 9 in (2.06 m)	205 lb (93 kg)	1995–09–21	Brazil
F	5	DeMarre Carroll	6 ft 8 in (2.03 m)	212 lb (96 kg)	1986–07–27	Missouri
G	10	DeMar DeRozan	6 ft 7 in (2.01 m)	220 lb (100 kg)	1989–08–07	USC
F	3	James Johnson	6 ft 9 in (2.06 m)	250 lb (113 kg)	1987–02–20	Wake Forest
G	6	Cory Joseph	6 ft 3 in (1.91 m)	190 lb (86 kg)	1991–08–20	Texas
G	7	Kyle Lowry	6 ft 0 in (1.83 m)	205 lb (93 kg)	1986–03–25	Villanova
C	92	Lucas Nogueira	7 ft 0 in (2.13 m)	220 lb (100 kg)	1992–07–26	Brazil
F/C	54	Patrick Patterson	6 ft 9 in (2.06 m)	235 lb (107 kg)	1989–03–14	Kentucky
G	24	Norman Powell	6 ft 4 in (1.93 m)	215 lb (98 kg)	1993–05–25	UCLA
G/F	31	Terrence Ross	6 ft 7 in (2.01 m)	195 lb (88 kg)	1991–02–05	Washington
F	4	Luis Scola	6 ft 9 in (2.06 m)	240 lb (109 kg)	1980–04–30	Argentina
F/C	1	Jason Thompson	6 ft 11 in (2.11 m)	250 lb (113 kg)	1986–07–21	Rider
C	17	Jonas Valančiūnas	7 ft 0 in (2.13 m)	255 lb (116 kg)	1992–05–06	Lithuania
G	55	Delon Wright	6 ft 5 in (1.96 m)	190 lb (86 kg)	1992–04–26	Utah

Coaches
Head coach
- Dwane Casey
Assistant(s)
- Andy Greer
- Rex Kalamian
- Jamaal Magloire
- Jama Mahlalela
- Alex McKechnie
- Nick Nurse
- Jerry Stackhouse

Legend
- (DP) Unsigned draft pick
- (FA) Free agent
- (S) Suspended
- (DL) On assignment to
  D-League affiliate
- Injured

Roster
Updated: 2016–04–02

== All-Star Game ==
The Raptors were the hosts for the NBA All-Star game in 2016. Kyle Lowry was selected by fan voting to the starting back court for the game, and DeMar DeRozan was also chosen to play in the game as a bench player.

== Standings ==
=== Preseason ===
2015 pre-season game log
Total: 5–2 (home: 4–0; road: 1–2)
Pre-season: 5–2 (home: 4–0; road: 1–2)

Game	Date	Team	Score	High points	High rebounds	High assists	Location Attendance	Record
1	October 4	L. A. Clippers	93–73	Kyle Lowry (26)	Jonas Valančiūnas (12)	Carroll, DeRozan, Lowry, Ross (2)	Rogers Arena; 19,000	1–0
2	October 5	@ Golden State	87–95	DeMarre Carroll (15)	Jonas Valančiūnas (10)	DeMar DeRozan (4)	SAP Center; 18,223	1–1
3	October 8	@ L. A. Lakers	105–97	Kyle Lowry (25)	Luis Scola (7)	Kyle Lowry (6)	Citizens Business Bank Arena; 8,123	2–1
4	October 12	Minnesota	112–105	Kyle Lowry (40)	DeMarre Carroll (8)	Cory Joseph (4)	Air Canada Centre; 19,277	3–1
5	October 14	@ Minnesota	87–89	Johnson, Wright (11)	Anthony Bennett (8)	Joseph, Wright (3)	Canadian Tire Centre; 15,522	3–2
6	October 18	Cleveland	87–81	Jonas Valančiūnas (12)	Bismack Biyombo (10)	Kyle Lowry (8)	Air Canada Centre; 19,800	4–2
7	October 23	Washington	92–82	DeMarre Carroll (16)	Bismack Biyombo (13)	Kyle Lowry (6)	Bell Centre; 20,072	5–2

2015–16 season schedule

=== Regular season standings ===
Atlantic Division	W	L	PCT	GB	Home	Road	Div	GP
y – Toronto Raptors	56	26	.683	–	32‍–‍9	24‍–‍17	14–2	82
x – Boston Celtics	48	34	.585	8.0	28‍–‍13	20‍–‍21	10–6	82
e – New York Knicks	32	50	.390	24.0	18‍–‍23	14‍–‍27	8–8	82
e – Brooklyn Nets	21	61	.256	35.0	14‍–‍27	7‍–‍34	6–10	82
e – Philadelphia 76ers	10	72	.122	46.0	7‍–‍34	3‍–‍38	2–14	82

Eastern Conference
#	Team	W	L	PCT	GB	GP
1	c – Cleveland Cavaliers *	57	25	.695	–	82
2	y – Toronto Raptors *	56	26	.683	1.0	82
3	y – Miami Heat *	48	34	.585	9.0	82
4	x – Atlanta Hawks	48	34	.585	9.0	82
5	x – Boston Celtics	48	34	.585	9.0	82
6	x – Charlotte Hornets	48	34	.585	9.0	82
7	x – Indiana Pacers	45	37	.549	12.0	82
8	x – Detroit Pistons	44	38	.537	13.0	82
9	e – Chicago Bulls	42	40	.512	15.0	82
10	e – Washington Wizards	41	41	.500	16.0	82
11	e – Orlando Magic	35	47	.427	22.0	82
12	e – Milwaukee Bucks	33	49	.402	24.0	82
13	e – New York Knicks	32	50	.390	25.0	82
14	e – Brooklyn Nets	21	61	.256	36.0	82
15	e – Philadelphia 76ers	10	72	.122	47.0	82

=== Regular season ===
2015–16 game log
Total: 56–26 (home: 32–9; road: 24–17)
October: 2–0 (home: 1–0; road: 1–0)

Game	Date	Team	Score	High points	High rebounds	High assists	Location Attendance	Record
1	October 28	Indiana	W 106–99	DeMar DeRozan (25)	Jonas Valančiūnas (15)	Lowry, DeRozan (6)	Air Canada Centre; 19,800	1–0
2	October 30	@ Boston	W 113–103	DeMar DeRozan (23)	Jonas Valančiūnas (10)	Kyle Lowry (9)	TD Garden; 16,898	2–0

November : 9–7 (home: 3–2; road: 6–5)

Game	Date	Team	Score	High points	High rebounds	High assists	Location Attendance	Record
3	November 1	Milwaukee	W 106–87	Jonas Valančiūnas (19)	Bismack Biyombo (10)	Kyle Lowry (7)	Air Canada Centre; 19,800	3–0
4	November 3	@ Dallas	W 102–91	Kyle Lowry (27)	Luis Scola (12)	Kyle Lowry (10)	American Airlines Center; 20,034	4–0
5	November 4	@ Oklahoma City	W 103–98	DeMar DeRozan (28)	Jonas Valančiūnas (11)	DeRozan, Joseph, Patterson (3)	Chesapeake Energy Arena; 18,203	5–0
6	November 6	@ Orlando	L 87–92	DeMar DeRozan (23)	Jonas Valančiūnas (14)	Luis Scola (5)	Amway Center; 16,578	5–1
7	November 8	@ Miami	L 76–96	Jonas Valančiūnas (17)	Biyombo, Johnson (7)	Kyle Lowry (8)	American Airlines Arena; 19,600	5–2
8	November 10	New York	L 109–111	DeMar DeRozan (29)	Jonas Valančiūnas (9)	Kyle Lowry (9)	Air Canada Centre; 19,800	5–3
9	November 11	@ Philadelphia	W 119–103	Luis Scola (21)	Jonas Valančiūnas (12)	Kyle Lowry (8)	Wells Fargo Center; 12,744	6–3
10	November 13	New Orleans	W 100–81	Valančiūnas, Lowry (20)	Jonas Valančiūnas (10)	DeMar DeRozan (13)	Air Canada Centre; 19,800	7–3
11	November 15	@ Sacramento	L 101–107	DeMar DeRozan (24)	Bismack Biyombo (6)	Kyle Lowry (7)	Sleep Train Arena; 17,006	7–4
12	November 17	@ Golden State	L 110–115	DeRozan, Kyle Lowry (28)	Jonas Valančiūnas (11)	DeRozan, Joseph (6)	Oracle Arena; 19,596	7–5
13	November 18	@ Utah	L 89–93	Luis Scola (22)	Jonas Valančiūnas (9)	DeRozan, Lowry (6)	Vivint Smart Home Arena; 18,741	7–6
14	November 20	@ L.A. Lakers	W 102–91	Kyle Lowry (25)	Carroll, Patterson (7)	Cory Joseph (6)	Staples Center; 18,997	8–6
15	November 22	@ L.A. Clippers	W 91–80	Carroll, DeRozan (21)	Bismack Biyombo (14)	Kyle Lowry (10)	Staples Center; 19,060	9–6
16	November 25	Cleveland	W 103–99	Kyle Lowry (27)	Bismack Biyombo (14)	Kyle Lowry (6)	Air Canada Centre; 20,140	10–6
17	November 28	@ Washington	W 84–82	Kyle Lowry (27)	Bismack Biyombo (16)	Cory Joseph (6)	Verizon Center; 16,841	11–6
18	November 29	Phoenix	L 102–107	DeMar DeRozan (29)	Biyombo, Lowry (8)	DeMar DeRozan (7)	Air Canada Centre; 19,800	11–7

December : 9–6 (home: 6–3; road: 3–3)

Game	Date	Team	Score	High points	High rebounds	High assists	Location Attendance	Record
19	December 2	@ Atlanta	W 96–86	Kyle Lowry (31)	Luis Scola (9)	Kyle Lowry (5)	Philips Arena; 12,559	12–7
20	December 3	Denver	L 105–106	DeMar DeRozan (34)	Bismack Biyombo (7)	Kyle Lowry (8)	Air Canada Centre; 19,800	12–8
21	December 5	Golden State	L 109–112	Kyle Lowry (41)	Patrick Patterson (10)	Kyle Lowry (7)	Air Canada Centre; 20,160	12–9
22	December 7	L.A. Lakers	W 102–93	Kyle Lowry (26)	Bismack Biyombo (13)	DeRozan, Lowry (6)	Air Canada Centre; 20,163	13–9
23	December 9	San Antonio	W 97–94	DeMar DeRozan (28)	Luis Scola (8)	Kyle Lowry (8)	Air Canada Centre; 19,800	14–9
24	December 11	Milwaukee	W 90–83	DeMar DeRozan (27)	Luis Scola (8)	Kyle Lowry (5)	Air Canada Centre; 19,800	15–9
25	December 13	Philadelphia	W 96–76	DeMar DeRozan (25)	Bismack Biyombo (9)	Cory Joseph (4)	Air Canada Centre; 19,800	16–9
26	December 14	@ Indiana	L 90–106	DeRozan, Lowry (20)	Bismack Biyombo (13)	Kyle Lowry (4)	Bankers Life Fieldhouse; 16,598	16–10
27	December 17	@ Charlotte	L 99–109 (OT)	DeMar DeRozan (31)	Bismack Biyombo (18)	Kyle Lowry (7)	Time Warner Cable Arena; 15,817	16–11
28	December 18	@ Miami	W 108–94	DeMar DeRozan (30)	Bismack Biyombo (15)	James Johnson (5)	American Airlines Arena; 19,600	17–11
29	December 20	Sacramento	L 94–104	DeMar DeRozan (28)	Bismack Biyombo (13)	Kyle Lowry (4)	Air Canada Centre; 19,800	17–12
30	December 22	Dallas	W 103–99	DeMar DeRozan (28)	Bismack Biyombo (20)	Kyle Lowry (7)	Air Canada Centre; 19,800	18–12
31	December 26	@ Milwaukee	W 111–90	DeMar DeRozan (22)	Bismack Biyombo (12)	Kyle Lowry (9)	BMO Harris Bradley Center; 16,329	19–12
32	December 28	@ Chicago	L 97–104	Kyle Lowry (28)	Bismack Biyombo (9)	Kyle Lowry (9)	United Center; 21,898	19–13
33	December 30	Washington	W 94–91	DeMar DeRozan (34)	Bismack Biyombo (12)	Kyle Lowry (6)	Air Canada Centre; 19,800	20–13

January : 12–2 (home: 8–1; road: 4–1)

Game	Date	Team	Score	High points	High rebounds	High assists	Location Attendance	Record
34	January 1	Charlotte	W 104–94	DeMar DeRozan (23)	Jonas Valančiūnas (13)	Kyle Lowry (6)	Air Canada Centre; 19,800	21–13
35	January 3	Chicago	L 113–115	DeMar DeRozan (24)	Jonas Valančiūnas (9)	Kyle Lowry (10)	Air Canada Centre; 19,800	21–14
36	January 4	@ Cleveland	L 100–122	Kyle Lowry (23)	Jonas Valančiūnas (8)	Kyle Lowry (10)	Quicken Loans Arena; 20,562	21–15
37	January 6	@ Brooklyn	W 91–74	Jonas Valančiūnas (22)	Jonas Valančiūnas (11)	Kyle Lowry (6)	Barclays Center; 14,544	22–15
38	January 8	@ Washington	W 97–88	DeMar DeRozan (35)	Kyle Lowry (10)	Kyle Lowry (4)	Verizon Center; 17,064	23–15
39	January 9	@ Philadelphia	W 108–95	Kyle Lowry (25)	Jonas Valančiūnas (9)	DeRozan, Lowry (5)	Wells Fargo Center; 14,100	24–15
40	January 14	@ Orlando	W 106–103 (OT)	Kyle Lowry (24)	DeMar DeRozan (11)	Kyle Lowry (7)	The O2 Arena (London, England); 18,689	25–15
41	January 18	Brooklyn	W 112–100	Kyle Lowry (31)	Jonas Valančiūnas (12)	Kyle Lowry (8)	Air Canada Centre; 19,800	26–15
42	January 20	Boston	W 115–109	DeMar DeRozan (34)	Jonas Valančiūnas (12)	Kyle Lowry (8)	Air Canada Centre; 19,800	27–15
43	January 22	Miami	W 101–81	DeMar DeRozan (33)	Jonas Valančiūnas (12)	Kyle Lowry (6)	Air Canada Centre; 19,800	28–15
44	January 24	LA Clippers	W 112–94	Kyle Lowry (21)	Bismack Biyombo (9)	Kyle Lowry (6)	Air Canada Centre; 19,800	29–15
45	January 26	Washington	W 106–89	Kyle Lowry (29)	Jonas Valančiūnas (12)	Cory Joseph (6)	Air Canada Centre; 19,800	30–15
46	January 28	New York	W 103–93	DeRozan, Lowry (26)	Jonas Valančiūnas (18)	Kyle Lowry (10)	Air Canada Centre; 19,800	31–15
47	January 30	Detroit	W 111–107	DeMar DeRozan (29)	Bismack Biyombo (13)	DeRozan, Joseph (4)	Air Canada Centre; 19,800	32–15

February : 7–4 (home: 3–0; road: 4–4)

Game	Date	Team	Score	High points	High rebounds	High assists	Location Attendance	Record
48	February 1	@ Denver	L 93–112	DeMar DeRozan (24)	Jonas Valančiūnas (8)	DeMar DeRozan (4)	Pepsi Center; 10,007	32–16
49	February 2	@ Phoenix	W 104–97	Kyle Lowry (26)	Bismack Biyombo (12)	Joseph, Lowry (4)	Talking Stick Resort Arena; 15,897	33–16
50	February 4	@ Portland	W 110–103	Kyle Lowry (30)	Jonas Valančiūnas (11)	Kyle Lowry (8)	Moda Center; 19,393	34–16
51	February 8	@ Detroit	W 103–89	Kyle Lowry (25)	Jonas Valančiūnas (8)	Kyle Lowry (7)	The Palace of Auburn Hills; 14,103	35–16
52	February 10	@ Minnesota	L 112–117	DeMar DeRozan (35)	Jonas Valančiūnas (7)	Kyle Lowry (7)	Target Center; 11,171	35–17
All-Star Break
53	February 19	@ Chicago	L 106–116	Kyle Lowry (27)	Jonas Valančiūnas (12)	Kyle Lowry (8)	United Center; 21,849	35–18
54	February 21	Memphis	W 98–85	DeMar DeRozan (21)	Jonas Valančiūnas (13)	Kyle Lowry (7)	Air Canada Centre; 19,800	36–18
55	February 22	@ New York	W 122–95	DeRozan, Lowry (22)	Kyle Lowry (11)	Kyle Lowry (11)	Madison Square Garden; 19,812	37–18
56	February 24	Minnesota	W 114–105	DeMar DeRozan (31)	Bismack Biyombo (11)	Kyle Lowry (6)	Air Canada Centre; 19,800	38–18
57	February 26	Cleveland	W 99–97	Kyle Lowry (43)	Jonas Valančiūnas (9)	Kyle Lowry (9)	Air Canada Centre; 19,800	39–18
58	February 28	@ Detroit	L 101–114	Terrence Ross (27)	Bismack Biyombo (7)	DeMar DeRozan (7)	The Palace of Auburn Hills; 17,201	39–19

March : 11–5 (home: 7–3; road: 4–2)

Game	Date	Team	Score	High points	High rebounds	High assists	Location Attendance	Record
59	March 2	Utah	W 104–94	Kyle Lowry (32)	Jonas Valančiūnas (8)	Kyle Lowry (5)	Air Canada Centre; 19,800	40–19
60	March 4	Portland	W 117–115	DeMar DeRozan (38)	Jonas Valančiūnas (10)	Kyle Lowry (6)	Air Canada Centre; 19,800	41–19
61	March 6	Houston	L 107–113	Luis Scola (21)	Jonas Valančiūnas (10)	Kyle Lowry (9)	Air Canada Centre; 19,800	41–20
62	March 8	Brooklyn	W 104–99	DeMar DeRozan (25)	Bismack Biyombo (10)	Kyle Lowry (9)	Air Canada Centre; 19,800	42–20
63	March 10	Atlanta	W 104–96	DeMar DeRozan (30)	Luis Scola (12)	Kyle Lowry (7)	Air Canada Centre; 19,800	43–20
64	March 12	Miami	W 112–104 (OT)	DeMar DeRozan (38)	DeRozan, Valančiūnas (10)	DeMar DeRozan (7)	Air Canada Centre; 19,800	44–20
65	March 14	Chicago	L 107–109	Kyle Lowry (33)	Kyle Lowry (11)	Kyle Lowry (7)	Air Canada Centre; 19,800	44–21
66	March 15	@ Milwaukee	W 107–89	Kyle Lowry (25)	Bismack Biyombo (13)	Kyle Lowry (11)	BMO Harris Bradley Center; 13,522	45–21
67	March 17	@ Indiana	W 101–94 (OT)	DeRozan, Lowry (28)	Bismack Biyombo (25)	Kyle Lowry (4)	Bankers Life Fieldhouse; 15,104	46–21
68	March 18	Boston	W 105–91	Kyle Lowry (32)	Bismack Biyombo (11)	DeMar DeRozan (6)	Air Canada Centre; 19,800	47–21
69	March 20	Orlando	W 105–100	DeMar DeRozan (25)	Bismack Biyombo (11)	Kyle Lowry (7)	Air Canada Centre; 19.800	48–21
70	March 23	@ Boston	L 79–91	DeMar DeRozan (21)	Bismack Biyombo (13)	Cory Joseph (4)	TD Garden; 18,624	48–22
71	March 25	@ Houston	L 109–112	DeMar DeRozan (18)	Jonas Valančiūnas (18)	Kyle Lowry (8)	Toyota Center; 18,230	48–23
72	March 26	@ New Orleans	W 115–91	DeMar DeRozan (23)	Jonas Valančiūnas (9)	Kyle Lowry (8)	Smoothie King Center; 17,009	49–23
73	March 28	Oklahoma City	L 100–119	DeMar DeRozan (19)	Jonas Valančiūnas (10)	DeMar DeRozan (5)	Air Canada Centre; 19,800	49–24
74	March 30	Atlanta	W 105–97	DeMar DeRozan (26)	Jonas Valančiūnas (9)	Kyle Lowry (11)	Air Canada Centre; 19,800	50–24

April : 6–2 (home: 3–0; road: 3–2)

Game	Date	Team	Score	High points	High rebounds	High assists	Location Attendance	Record
75	April 1	@ Memphis	W 99–95	DeMar DeRozan (27)	Jonas Valančiūnas (14)	Norman Powell (5)	FedExForum; 17,077	51–24
76	April 2	@ San Antonio	L 95–102	Norman Powell (17)	Patrick Patterson (7)	Cory Joseph (7)	AT&T Center; 18,418	51–25
77	April 5	Charlotte	W 96–90	DeMar DeRozan (26)	Jonas Valančiūnas (12)	Kyle Lowry (6)	Air Canada Centre; 19,800	52–25
78	April 7	@ Atlanta	L 87–95	DeRozan, Lowry (16)	Bismack Biyombo (9)	Kyle Lowry (6)	Philips Arena; 17,864	52–26
79	April 8	Indiana	W 111–98	Norman Powell (27)	Jason Thompson (6)	Cory Joseph (9)	Air Canada Centre; 19,800	53–26
80	April 10	@ New York	W 93–89	DeMar DeRozan (27)	Bismack Biyombo (8)	Kyle Lowry (7)	Madison Square Garden; 19,812	54–26
81	April 12	Philadelphia	W 122–98	Norman Powell (18)	Jonas Valančiūnas (11)	DeMar DeRozan (6)	Air Canada Centre; 19,800	55–26
82	April 13	@ Brooklyn	W 103–96	Norman Powell (30)	Terrence Ross (10)	Delon Wright (7)	Barclays Center; 16,517	56–26

2015–16 season schedule

== Playoffs ==
=== Game log ===
2016 playoff game log
Total: 10–10 (home: 8–3; road: 2–7)
First Round: 4–3 (home: 3–1; road: 1–2)

Game	Date	Team	Score	High points	High rebounds	High assists	Location Attendance	Series
1	April 16	Indiana	L 90–100	Cory Joseph (18)	Jonas Valančiūnas (19)	Kyle Lowry (7)	Air Canada Centre; 19,800	0–1
2	April 18	Indiana	W 98–87	Jonas Valančiūnas (23)	Jonas Valančiūnas (15)	Kyle Lowry (9)	Air Canada Centre; 19,800	1–1
3	April 21	@ Indiana	W 101–85	DeRozan, Lowry (21)	Jonas Valančiūnas (14)	Kyle Lowry (8)	Bankers Life Fieldhouse; 18,165	2–1
4	April 23	@ Indiana	L 83–100	Jonas Valančiūnas (16)	Bismack Biyombo (9)	Kyle Lowry (5)	Bankers Life Fieldhouse; 18,165	2–2
5	April 26	Indiana	W 102–99	DeMar DeRozan (34)	Bismack Biyombo (16)	Kyle Lowry (5)	Air Canada Centre; 19,800	3–2
6	April 29	@ Indiana	L 83–101	Carroll, Lowry (15)	Bismack Biyombo (10)	Kyle Lowry (10)	Bankers Life Fieldhouse; 18,165	3–3
7	May 1	Indiana	W 89–84	DeMar DeRozan, (30)	Jonas Valančiūnas (15)	Kyle Lowry (9)	Air Canada Centre; 20,669	4–3

Conference Semifinals: 4–3 (home: 3–1; road: 1–2)

Game	Date	Team	Score	High points	High rebounds	High assists	Location Attendance	Series
1	May 3	Miami	L 96–102 (OT)	Jonas Valančiūnas (24)	Jonas Valančiūnas (14)	Kyle Lowry (6)	Air Canada Centre; 19,800	0–1
2	May 5	Miami	W 96–92 (OT)	DeMarre Carroll (21)	Jonas Valančiūnas (12)	Kyle Lowry (6)	Air Canada Centre; 20,906	1–1
3	May 7	@ Miami	W 95–91	Kyle Lowry (33)	Jonas Valančiūnas (12)	DeMar DeRozan (5)	American Airlines Arena; 19,675	2–1
4	May 9	@ Miami	L 87–94 (OT)	Joseph, Ross (14)	Bismack Biyombo (13)	Kyle Lowry (9)	American Airlines Arena; 19,600	2–2
5	May 11	Miami	W 99–91	DeMar DeRozan (34)	Kyle Lowry (10)	Kyle Lowry (6)	Air Canada Centre; 20,155	3–2
6	May 13	@ Miami	L 91–103	Kyle Lowry (36)	Bismack Biyombo (13)	Kyle Lowry (3)	American Airlines Arena; 15,797	3–3
7	May 15	Miami	W 116–89	Kyle Lowry (35)	Bismack Biyombo (16)	Kyle Lowry (9)	Air Canada Centre; 20,257	4–3

Conference Finals: 2–4 (home: 2–1; road: 0–3)

Game	Date	Team	Score	High points	High rebounds	High assists	Location Attendance	Series
1	May 17	@ Cleveland	L 84–115	DeMar DeRozan (18)	Biyombo, Johnson, Lowry (4)	DeRozan, Lowry (5)	Quicken Loans Arena; 20,562	0–1
2	May 19	@ Cleveland	L 89–108	DeMar DeRozan (22)	Kyle Lowry (6)	Patrick Patterson (4)	Quicken Loans Arena; 20,562	0–2
3	May 21	Cleveland	W 99–84	DeMar DeRozan (32)	Bismack Biyombo (26)	DeMar DeRozan (4)	Air Canada Centre; 20,207	1–2
4	May 23	Cleveland	W 105–99	Kyle Lowry (35)	Bismack Biyombo (14)	Kyle Lowry (5)	Air Canada Centre; 20,367	2–2
5	May 25	@ Cleveland	L 78–116	DeMar DeRozan (14)	Jason Thompson (5)	Kyle Lowry (6)	Quicken Loans Arena; 20,526	2–3
6	May 27	Cleveland	L 87–113	Kyle Lowry (35)	Bismack Biyombo (9)	DeRozan, Lowry (3)	Air Canada Centre; 20,605	2–4

2016 playoff schedule

== Player statistics ==
=== Regular season ===
Player	POS	GP	GS	MP	REB	AST	STL	BLK	PTS	MPG	RPG	APG	SPG	BPG	PPG
Bismack Biyombo	C	82	22	1,808	655	29	19	133	454	22.0	8.0	.4	.2	1.6	5.5
Cory Joseph	SG	80	4	2,046	210	250	63	20	677	25.6	2.6	3.1	.8	.3	8.5
Patrick Patterson	PF	79	0	2,020	342	94	53	32	543	25.6	4.3	1.2	.7	.4	6.9
DeMar DeRozan	SG	78	78	2,804	349	315	81	21	1,830	35.9	4.5	4.0	1.0	.3	23.5
Kyle Lowry	PG	77	77	2,851	365	494	158	34	1,634	37.0	4.7	6.4	2.1	.4	21.2
Luis Scola	PF	76	76	1,636	360	66	46	27	664	21.5	4.7	.9	.6	.4	8.7
Terrence Ross	SF	73	7	1,747	185	56	54	25	720	23.9	2.5	.8	.7	.3	9.9
Jonas Valančiūnas	C	60	59	1,557	547	42	25	80	768	26.0	9.1	.7	.4	1.3	12.8
James Johnson	PF	57	32	926	126	67	29	33	287	16.2	2.2	1.2	.5	.6	5.0
Norman Powell	SG	49	24	725	111	47	29	10	273	14.8	2.3	1.0	.6	.2	5.6
Lucas Nogueira	C	29	1	225	46	7	12	12	65	7.8	1.6	.2	.4	.4	2.2
Delon Wright	PG	27	1	229	37	31	8	3	103	8.5	1.4	1.1	.3	.1	3.8
DeMarre Carroll	SF	26	22	786	122	27	44	6	286	30.2	4.7	1.0	1.7	.2	11.0
Jason Thompson^{†}	C	19	6	292	80	10	8	12	87	15.4	4.2	.5	.4	.6	4.6
Anthony Bennett	PF	19	0	84	23	0	5	0	28	4.4	1.2	.0	.3	.0	1.5
Bruno Caboclo	SF	6	1	43	2	1	2	1	3	7.2	.3	.2	.3	.2	.5

- ^{†} Denotes player spent time with another team in the season. Stats reflect time with the Raptors only.

=== Playoffs ===
Player	POS	GP	GS	MP	REB	AST	STL	BLK	PTS	MPG	RPG	APG	SPG	BPG	PPG
Kyle Lowry	PG	20	20	766	94	119	32	3	382	38.3	4.7	6.0	1.6	.2	19.1
DeMar DeRozan	SG	20	20	746	83	54	22	3	418	37.3	4.2	2.7	1.1	.2	20.9
DeMarre Carroll	SF	20	19	596	81	17	18	7	177	29.8	4.1	.9	.9	.4	8.9
Bismack Biyombo	C	20	10	506	187	8	8	27	123	25.3	9.4	.4	.4	1.4	6.2
Patrick Patterson	PF	20	9	583	77	24	7	9	153	29.2	3.9	1.2	.4	.5	7.7
Cory Joseph	SG	20	0	452	41	47	18	2	170	22.6	2.1	2.4	.9	.1	8.5
Terrence Ross	SF	20	0	335	32	11	13	5	126	16.8	1.6	.6	.7	.3	6.3
Norman Powell	SG	18	3	206	27	6	13	2	68	11.4	1.5	.3	.7	.1	3.8
Jonas Valančiūnas	C	12	10	321	129	11	10	14	165	26.8	10.8	.9	.8	1.2	13.8
Luis Scola	PF	11	9	140	18	7	3	0	28	12.7	1.6	.6	.3	.0	2.5
James Johnson	PF	10	0	98	15	6	3	0	30	9.8	1.5	.6	.3	.0	3.0
Jason Thompson	C	10	0	55	11	1	0	1	8	5.5	1.1	.1	.0	.1	.8
Delon Wright	PG	9	0	41	4	3	3	0	14	4.6	.4	.3	.3	.0	1.6
Lucas Nogueira	C	5	0	29	8	0	0	0	6	5.8	1.6	.0	.0	.0	1.2

== Transactions ==
=== Overview ===
Players Added

Via trade to Toronto

- 46th Overall Pick (Norman Powell)
- 2017 first-round pick
Players Lost

Via trade to Milwaukee

- Greivis Vásquez

=== Trades ===
June 25, 2015	To Toronto Raptors 2017 First Round Draft Pick; Norman Powell	To Milwaukee Bucks Greivis Vásquez

=== Free agents ===
==== Additions ====
Player	Signed	Former Team
DeMarre Carroll	Signed 4-year contract worth $60 million	Atlanta Hawks
Cory Joseph	Signed 4-year contract worth $30 million	San Antonio Spurs
Luis Scola	Signed 1-year contract worth $2.9 million	Indiana Pacers
Bismack Biyombo	Signed 1-year contract worth $5.7 million	Charlotte Hornets
Ronald Roberts	Signed 2-year contract worth $1.4 million	San Miguel Beermen
Michale Kyser	Signed 1-year contract worth $525K	Louisiana Tech
Axel Toupane	Signed 1-year contract worth $525K	Strasbourg IG
Anthony Bennett	Signed 1-year deal worth $1.3 million	Minnesota Timberwolves

==== Subtractions ====
Player	Reason Left	New Team
Amir Johnson	Signed 2-year contract worth $24 million	Boston Celtics
Louis Williams	Signed 3-year contract worth $21 million	Los Angeles Lakers
Tyler Hansbrough	Signed 1-year contract worth $1.1 million	Charlotte Hornets
Anthony Bennett	Waived	Brooklyn Nets
