= 2015–16 Denver Nuggets season =

NBA professional basketball team season

- Head coach: Michael Malone
- General manager: Tim Connelly
- Owners: Ann Walton Kroenke
- Arena: Pepsi Center

Results
- Record: 33–49 (.402)
- Place: Division: 4th (Northwest); Conference: 11th (Western)
- Playoff finish: Did not qualify
- Stats at Basketball Reference

Local media
- Television: Altitude Sports and Entertainment
- Radio: KCKK

The 2015–16 Denver Nuggets season was the 40th season of the franchise in the National Basketball Association (NBA). The season saw the team change their uniforms.

== Draft ==
Round	Pick	Player	Position	Nationality	School/Club/Team
1	7	Emmanuel Mudiay	PG	United States	Guangdong Southern Tigers
2	57	Nikola Radičević	PG	Serbia	Baloncesto Sevilla

== Pre-season ==
2015 pre-season game log
Total: 4–3 (Home: 2–0; Road: 2–3)
Pre-season: 4–3 (home: 2–0; road: 2–3)

Game	Date	Team	Score	High points	High rebounds	High assists	Location Attendance	Record
1	October 2	@ L.A. Clippers	96–103	Joffrey Lauvergne (16)	Will Barton (13)	Jameer Nelson (7)	Staples Center; 14,245	0–1
2	October 6	@ Dallas	96–86	Emmanuel Mudiay (17)	Joffrey Lauvergne (14)	Gallinari, Mudiay (5)	American Airlines Center; 17,038	1–1
3	October 8	Chicago	112–94	Joffrey Lauvergne (18)	Joffrey Lauvergne (8)	Mudiay, Nelson (7)	Coors Events Center; 5,305	2–1
4	October 13	@ Golden State	114–103	Kenneth Faried (22)	Kenneth Faried (12)	Emmanuel Mudiay (9)	Oracle Arena; 19,596	3–1
5	October 16	Phoenix	106–81	Barton, Jokic (19)	Wilson Chandler (19)	Jameer Nelson (12)	Pepsi Center; 8,552	4–1
6	October 18	@ Oklahoma City	98–111	Emmanuel Mudiay (22)	Lauvergne, Mudiay (5)	Erick Green (4)	Chesapeake Energy Arena; N/A	4–2
7	October 22	@ Utah	78–98	Danilo Gallinari (19)	Nikola Jokić (9)	Erick Green (4)	EnergySolutions Arena; 17,083	4–3

2015–16 season schedule

== Regular season game log ==
2015–16 game log
Total: 33–49 (Home: 18–23; Road: 15–26)
October: 1–1 (home: 0–1; road: 1–0)

Game	Date	Team	Score	High points	High rebounds	High assists	Location Attendance	Record
1	October 28	@ Houston	W 105–85	Danilo Gallinari (23)	Kenneth Faried (9)	Emmanuel Mudiay (9)	Toyota Center; 18,240	1–0
2	October 30	Minnesota	L 78–95	Emmanuel Mudiay (15)	Kenneth Faried (15)	Jameer Nelson (4)	Pepsi Center; 17,660	1–1

November: 5–11 (home: 3–5; road: 2–6)

Game	Date	Team	Score	High points	High rebounds	High assists	Location Attendance	Record
3	November 1	@ Oklahoma City	L 93–117	Barton, Gallinari (15)	Joffrey Lauvergne (7)	Jameer Nelson (7)	Chesapeake Energy Arena; 18,203	1–2
4	November 3	@ L.A. Lakers	W 120–109	Kenneth Faried (28)	Kenneth Faried (15)	Emmanuel Mudiay (10)	Staples Center; 18,997	2–2
5	November 5	Utah	L 84–96	Danilo Gallinari (18)	Kenneth Faried (10)	Jameer Nelson (4)	Pepsi Center; 9,906	2–3
6	November 6	@ Golden State	L 104–119	Danilo Gallinari (25)	Kenneth Faried (11)	Barton, Nelson, Mudiay (5)	Oracle Arena; 19,596	2–4
7	November 9	Portland	W 108–104	JJ Hickson (19)	JJ Hickson (13)	Emmanuel Mudiay (5)	Pepsi Center; 9,153	3–4
8	November 11	Milwaukee	W 103–102	Danilo Gallinari (25)	Kenneth Faried (9)	Emmanuel Mudiay (11)	Pepsi Center; 9,403	4–4
9	November 13	Houston	W 107–98	Danilo Gallinari (27)	Kenneth Faried (11)	Emmanuel Mudiay (11)	Pepsi Center; 16,113	5–4
10	November 14	@ Phoenix	L 81–105	Will Barton (19)	Will Barton (12)	Will Barton (4)	Talking Stick Resort Arena; 16,722	5–5
11	November 17	@ New Orleans	W 115–98	Danilo Gallinari (32)	Danilo Gallinari (8)	Gallinari, Mudiay (8)	Smoothie King Center; 17,269	6–5
12	November 18	@ San Antonio	L 98–109	Nikola Jokić (23)	Nikola Jokić (12)	Emmanuel Mudiay (7)	AT&T Center; 18,418	6–6
13	November 20	Phoenix	L 107–114	Emmanuel Mudiay (23)	Danilo Gallinari (10)	Jameer Nelson (7)	Pepsi Center; 12,264	6–7
14	November 22	Golden State	L 105–118	Darrell Arthur (21)	Nikola Jokić (11)	Emmanuel Mudiay (8)	Pepsi Center; 17,689	6–8
15	November 24	L.A. Clippers	L 94–111	Danilo Gallinari (20)	Danilo Gallinari (18)	Emmanuel Mudiay (4)	Pepsi Center; 13,257	6–9
16	November 27	San Antonio	L 80–91	Danilo Gallinari (16)	Danilo Gallinari (10)	Harris, Foye, Mudiay (3)	Pepsi Center; 17,121	6–10
17	November 28	@ Dallas	L 81–92	Darrell Arthur (16)	Danilo Gallinari (9)	Barton, Mudiay (4)	AmericanAirlines Center; 20,339	6–11
18	November 30	@ Milwaukee	L 74–92	Danilo Gallinari (13)	Faried, Foye (7)	Mudiay, Nelson (4)	BMO Harris Bradley Center; 10,187	6–12

December: 6–9 (home: 2–4; road: 4–5)

Game	Date	Team	Score	High points	High rebounds	High assists	Location Attendance	Record
19	December 2	@ Chicago	L 90–99	Will Barton (16)	Kenneth Faried (9)	Emmanuel Mudiay (7)	United Center; 21,349	6–13
20	December 3	@ Toronto	W 106–105	Will Barton (22)	Joffrey Lauvergne (10)	Emmanuel Mudiay (9)	Air Canada Centre; 19,800	7–13
21	December 5	@ Philadelphia	W 108–105	Danilo Gallinari (24)	Barton, Faried (9)	Mudiay, Miller (6)	Wells Fargo Center; 15,677	8–13
22	December 8	Orlando	L 74–85	Will Barton (23)	Faried, Hickson (11)	Jameer Nelson (5)	Pepsi Center; 13,925	8–14
23	December 11	Minnesota	W 111–108 (OT)	Danilo Gallinari (23)	Kenneth Faried (12)	Jameer Nelson (7)	Pepsi Center; 12,533	9–14
24	December 14	Houston	W 114–108	Will Barton (23)	Joffrey Lauvergne (11)	Gallinari, Nelson (7)	Pepsi Center; 12,022	10–14
25	December 15	@ Minnesota	W 112–100	Faried, Foye (19)	Kenneth Faried (10)	Gallinari, Barton (5)	Target Center; 11,323	11–14
26	December 18	@ Utah	L 88–97	Will Barton (16)	Joffrey Lauvergne (13)	Jameer Nelson (6)	Vivint Smart Home Arena; 19,169	11–15
27	December 20	New Orleans	L 125–130	Will Barton (32)	Will Barton (10)	Barton, Nelson (6)	Pepsi Center; 13,857	11–16
28	December 22	L.A. Lakers	L 107–111	Will Barton (25)	Nikola Jokić (10)	Jameer Nelson (7)	Pepsi Center; 19,124	11–17
29	December 23	@ Phoenix	W 104–96	Randy Foye (31)	Darrell Arthur (10)	Randy Foye (6)	Talking Stick Resort Arena; 17,034	12–17
30	December 26	@ San Antonio	L 86–101	Nikola Jokić (22)	Nikola Jokić (7)	Harris, Jokić (5)	AT&T Center; 18,420	12–18
31	December 27	@ Oklahoma City	L 112–122	Kenneth Faried (25)	Kenneth Faried (11)	Barton, Nelson (5)	Chesapeake Energy Arena; 18,203	12–19
32	December 29	Cleveland	L 87–93	Will Barton (29)	Kenneth Faried (8)	Jameer Nelson (8)	Pepsi Center; 17,523	12–20
33	December 30	@ Portland	L 103–110	Will Barton (31)	Kenneth Faried (12)	Jameer Nelson (8)	Moda Center; 19,393	12–21

January: 6–9 (home: 4–5; road: 2–4)

Game	Date	Team	Score	High points	High rebounds	High assists	Location Attendance	Record
34	January 2	@ Golden State	L 108–111 (OT)	Danilo Gallinari (24)	Will Barton (13)	Will Barton, Nelson (7)	Oracle Arena; 19,596	12–22
35	January 3	Portland	L 106–112	Danilo Gallinari (29)	Nikola Jokić (10)	Jameer Nelson (7)	Pepsi Center; 11,883	12–23
36	January 6	@ Minnesota	W 78–74	Danilo Gallinari (20)	Jusuf Nurkić (10)	Darrell Arthur (5)	Target Center; 12,059	13–23
37	January 8	@ Memphis	L 84–91	Danilo Gallinari (29)	Arthur, Barton (9)	Jameer Nelson (9)	FedExForum; 17,499	13–24
38	January 10	Charlotte	W 95–92	Danilo Gallinari (27)	Will Barton (8)	Nikola Jokić (9)	Pepsi Center; 11,343	14–24
39	January 13	Golden State	W 112–110	Danilo Gallinari (28)	Darrell Arthur (11)	Jameer Nelson (9)	Pepsi Center; 18,004	15–24
40	January 15	Miami	L 95–98	Darrell Arthur (18)	Arthur, Barton (8)	Nikola Jokić (5)	Pepsi Center; 15,406	15–25
41	January 17	Indiana	W 129–126	Danilo Gallinari (23)	Kenneth Faried (9)	Foye, Mudiay (6)	Pepsi Center; 11,104	16–25
42	January 19	Oklahoma City	L 104–110	Danilo Gallinari (27)	Kenneth Faried (15)	Emmanuel Mudiay (9)	Pepsi Center; 12,844	16–26
43	January 21	Memphis	L 101–102	Gallinari, Faried (17)	Kenneth Faried (12)	Emmanuel Mudiay (8)	Pepsi Center; 16,140	16–27
44	January 23	Detroit	W 104–101	Danilo Gallinari (30)	Danilo Gallinari (6)	Emmanuel Mudiay (4)	Pepsi Center; 14,646	17–27
45	January 25	Atlanta	L 105–119	Will Barton (21)	Nikola Jokić (10)	Emmanuel Mudiay (6)	Pepsi Center; 10,280	17–28
46	January 27	@ Boston	L 103–111	Barton, Gallinari (23)	Kenneth Faried (15)	Barton, Faried, Jokić, Mudiay (4)	TD Garden; 18,108	17–29
47	January 28	@ Washington	W 117–113	Danilo Gallinari (26)	Nikola Jokić (10)	Danilo Gallinari (6)	Verizon Center; 15,146	18–29
48	January 30	@ Indiana	L 105–109 (OT)	Danilo Gallinari (23)	Kenneth Faried (12)	Emmanuel Mudiay (8)	Bankers Life Fieldhouse; 18,165	18–30

February: 5–7 (home: 2–3; road: 3–4)

Game	Date	Team	Score	High points	High rebounds	High assists	Location Attendance	Record
49	February 1	Toronto	W 112–93	Nikola Jokić (27)	Nikola Jokić (14)	Emmanuel Mudiay (8)	Pepsi Center; 10,007	19–30
50	February 3	@ Utah	L 81–85	Danilo Gallinari (24)	Will Barton (10)	Emmanuel Mudiay (6)	Vivint Smart Home Arena; 19,461	19–31
51	February 5	Chicago	W 115–110	Danilo Gallinari (33)	Nikola Jokić (12)	Randy Foye (6)	Pepsi Center; 19,155	20–31
52	February 7	@ New York	W 101–96	Barton, Gallinari (19)	Will Barton (11)	Emmanuel Mudiay (9)	Madison Square Garden; 19,812	21–31
53	February 8	@ Brooklyn	L 104–105	Danilo Gallinari (24)	Kenneth Faried (13)	Emmanuel Mudiay (8)	Barclays Center; 13,043	21–32
54	February 10	@ Detroit	W 103–92	Will Barton (20)	Jusuf Nurkić (11)	Emmanuel Mudiay (6)	The Palace of Auburn Hills; 19,971	22–32
All-Star Break
55	February 19	@ Sacramento	L 110–116	Danilo Gallinari (27)	Barton, Faried (9)	D. J. Augustin (6)	Sleep Train Arena; 17,317	22–33
56	February 21	Boston	L 101–121	Nikola Jokić (23)	Nikola Jokić (13)	Augustin, Jokic (4)	Pepsi Center; 16,065	22–34
57	February 23	Sacramento	L 110–114	Will Barton (18)	Nikola Jokić (13)	Nikola Jokić (6)	Pepsi Center; 15,721	22–35
58	February 24	@ L.A. Clippers	W 87–81	Kenneth Faried (21)	Faried, Jokić (11)	Emmanuel Mudiay (6)	Staples Center; 19,060	23–35
59	February 26	@ Dallas	L 116–122 (OT)	Will Barton (22)	Kenneth Faried (12)	Emmanuel Mudiay (6)	AmericanAirlines Center; 20,298	23–36
60	February 29	Memphis	L 96–103	Kenneth Faried (16)	Kenneth Faried (11)	Emmanuel Mudiay (7)	Pepsi Center; 10,324	23–37

March: 9–8 (home: 6–2; road: 3–6)

Game	Date	Team	Score	High points	High rebounds	High assists	Location Attendance	Record
61	March 2	L.A. Lakers	W 117–107	D. J. Augustin (26)	Joffrey Lauvergne (10)	Emmanuel Mudiay (7)	Pepsi Center; 20,096	24–37
62	March 4	Brooklyn	L 120–121 (OT)	Emmanuel Mudiay (25)	Nikola Jokić (12)	Emmanuel Mudiay (7)	Pepsi Center; 14,163	24–38
63	March 6	Dallas	W 116–114 (OT)	Kenneth Faried (25)	Kenneth Faried (20)	Emmanuel Mudiay (8)	Pepsi Center; 14,802	25–38
64	March 8	New York	W 110–94	Kenneth Faried (24)	Kenneth Faried (10)	D. J. Augustin (6)	Pepsi Center; 13,305	26–38
65	March 10	Phoenix	W 116–98	Emmanuel Mudiay (30)	Nikola Jokić (10)	D. J. Augustin (6)	Pepsi Center; 11,582	27–38
66	March 12	Washington	W 116–100	Arthur, Augustin, Harris, Jokić (17)	Will Barton (10)	D. J. Augustin (10)	Pepsi Center; 13,213	28–38
67	March 14	@ Miami	L 119–123	Emmanuel Mudiay (23)	Kenneth Faried (11)	Emmanuel Mudiay (10)	American Airlines Arena; 19,744	28–39
68	March 15	@ Orlando	L 110–116	Gary Harris (18)	Joffrey Lauvergne (8)	D. J. Augustin (8)	Amway Center; 16,988	28–40
69	March 17	@ Atlanta	L 98–116	D. J. Augustin (17)	Nikola Jokić (7)	D. J. Augustin (7)	Philips Arena; 14,383	28–41
70	March 19	@ Charlotte	W 101–93	D. J. Augustin (24)	Nikola Jokić (14)	Jokić, Mudiay (4)	Time Warner Cable Arena; 19,271	29–41
71	March 21	@ Cleveland	L 91–124	Will Barton (27)	Nikola Jokić (7)	D. J. Augustin (5)	Quicken Loans Arena; 20,562	29–42
72	March 23	Philadelphia	W 104–103	Emmanuel Mudiay (27)	Emmanuel Mudiay (10)	Augustin, Jokić (5)	Pepsi Center; 10,684	30–42
73	March 25	@ L.A. Lakers	W 116–105	D. J. Augustin (20)	Nikola Jokić (12)	D. J. Augustin (8)	Staples Center; 18,997	31–42
74	March 27	@ L.A. Clippers	L 90–105	Nikola Jokić (19)	Darrell Arthur (12)	D. J. Augustin (10)	Staples Center; 19,060	31–43
75	March 28	Dallas	L 88–97	Will Barton (23)	Kenneth Faried (11)	Emmanuel Mudiay (7)	Pepsi Center; 14,844	31–44
76	March 30	@ Memphis	W 109–105	Will Barton (25)	Nikola Jokić (14)	D. J. Augustin (5)	FedExForum; 16,401	32–44
77	March 31	@ New Orleans	L 95–101	Darrell Arthur (24)	Kenneth Faried (12)	D. J. Augustin (8)	Smoothie King Center; 16,269	32–45

April: 1–4 (home: 1–3; road: 0–1)

Game	Date	Team	Score	High points	High rebounds	High assists	Location Attendance	Record
78	April 2	Sacramento	L 106–115	Gary Harris (19)	Nikola Jokić (13)	Emmanuel Mudiay (6)	Pepsi Center; 15,607	32–46
79	April 5	Oklahoma City	L 102–124	Gary Harris (17)	Joffrey Lauvergne (10)	Gary Harris (5)	Pepsi Center; 12,611	32–47
80	April 8	San Antonio	W 102–98	Jusuf Nurkić (21)	Nikola Jokić (15)	Emmanuel Mudiay (5)	Pepsi Center; 16,347	33–47
81	April 10	Utah	L 84–100	Mudiay, Jokić (19)	Nikola Jokić (11)	Emmanuel Mudiay (5)	Pepsi Center; 16,172	33–48
82	April 13	@ Portland	L 99–107	Emmanuel Mudiay (25)	Nikola Jokić (14)	Emmanuel Mudiay (6)	Moda Center; 19,571	33–49

2015–16 season schedule

== Player statistics ==
Legend
GP	Games played	GS	Games started	MPG	Minutes per game
FG%	Field-goal percentage	3P%	3-point field-goal percentage	FT%	Free-throw percentage
RPG	Rebounds per game	APG	Assists per game	SPG	Steals per game
BPG	Blocks per game	PPG	Points per game

=== Regular season ===
Player	GP	GS	MPG	FG%	3P%	FT%	RPG	APG	SPG	BPG	PPG
Darrell Arthur	70	16	21.7	.452	.385	.755	4.2	1.4	.8	.7	7.5
D. J. Augustin^{a}	28	0	23.5	.445	.411	.819	1.9	4.7	.9	.1	11.6
Will Barton	82	1	28.7	.432	.345	.806	5.8	2.5	.9	.5	14.4
Kenneth Faried	67	64	25.3	.558	.500	.613	8.7	1.2	.5	.9	12.5
Randy Foye^{a}	54	7	19.8	.351	.296	.830	1.9	2.1	.5	.3	6.0
Danilo Gallinari	53	53	34.7	.410	.364	.868	5.3	2.5	.8	.4	19.5
Erick Green^{a}	3	0	2.3	.000	.000	.000	.3	.3	.00	.00	.00
Gary Harris	76	76	32.1	.469	.354	.820	2.9	1.9	1.3	.2	12.3
JJ Hickson^{a}	20	9	15.3	.505	.000	.458	4.4	.8	.5	.6	6.9
Nikola Jokić	80	55	21.7	.512	.333	.811	7.0	2.4	1.0	.6	10.0
Sean Kilpatrick^{a}	8	0	10.3	.381	.235	.875	.8	.4	.3	.00	3.4
Joffrey Lauvergne	59	15	17.6	.513	.245	.899	4.9	.9	.2	.3	7.9
Mike Miller	47	2	7.9	.355	.365	.000	1.1	.9	.3	.1	1.3
Emmanuel Mudiay	68	66	30.4	.364	.319	.670	3.4	5.5	1.0	.5	12.8
Jameer Nelson	39	15	26.6	.368	.299	.857	2.9	4.9	.6	.1	7.7
Jusuf Nurkić	32	3	17.1	.417	.000	.616	5.5	1.3	.8	1.4	8.2
Kostas Papanikolaou^{a}	26	6	11.3	.364	.313	.643	1.5	.6	.5	.2	2.6
JaKarr Sampson^{a}	26	22	18.0	.470	.276	.720	2.3	.6	.5	.7	5.2
Axel Toupane	21	0	14.5	.357	.325	.765	1.5	.7	.3	.3	3.6

^{a} Statistics with the Denver Nuggets.

== Standings ==
Northwest Division	W	L	PCT	GB	Home	Road	Div	GP
y – Oklahoma City Thunder	55	27	.671	–	32‍–‍9	23‍–‍18	13–3	82
x – Portland Trail Blazers	44	38	.537	11.0	28‍–‍13	16‍–‍25	11–5	82
e – Utah Jazz	40	42	.488	15.0	24‍–‍17	16‍–‍25	8–8	82
e – Denver Nuggets	33	49	.402	22.0	18‍–‍23	15‍–‍26	4–12	82
e – Minnesota Timberwolves	29	53	.354	26.0	14‍–‍27	15‍–‍26	4–12	82

Western Conference
#	Team	W	L	PCT	GB	GP
1	z – Golden State Warriors *	73	9	.890	–	82
2	y – San Antonio Spurs *	67	15	.817	6.0	82
3	y – Oklahoma City Thunder *	55	27	.671	18.0	82
4	x – Los Angeles Clippers	53	29	.646	20.0	82
5	x – Portland Trail Blazers	44	38	.537	29.0	82
6	x – Dallas Mavericks	42	40	.512	31.0	82
7	x – Memphis Grizzlies	42	40	.512	31.0	82
8	x – Houston Rockets	41	41	.500	32.0	82
9	e – Utah Jazz	40	42	.488	33.0	82
10	e – Sacramento Kings	33	49	.402	40.0	82
11	e – Denver Nuggets	33	49	.402	40.0	82
12	e – New Orleans Pelicans	30	52	.366	43.0	82
13	e – Minnesota Timberwolves	29	53	.354	44.0	82
14	e – Phoenix Suns	23	59	.280	50.0	82
15	e – Los Angeles Lakers	17	65	.207	56.0	82

== Roster ==
2015–16 Denver Nuggets roster
Players

Pos.	No.	Player	Height	Weight	DOB	From
PF	00	Darrell Arthur	6 ft 9 in (2.06 m)	235 lb (107 kg)	1988–03–25	Kansas
PG	12	D. J. Augustin	6 ft 0 in (1.83 m)	183 lb (83 kg)	1987–11–10	Texas
SG	5	Will Barton	6 ft 6 in (1.98 m)	175 lb (79 kg)	1991–01–06	Memphis
SF	21	Wilson Chandler (injured)	6 ft 8 in (2.03 m)	225 lb (102 kg)	1987–05–10	DePaul
PF	35	Kenneth Faried	6 ft 8 in (2.03 m)	228 lb (103 kg)	1989–11–19	Morehead State
SF	8	Danilo Gallinari (injured)	6 ft 10 in (2.08 m)	225 lb (102 kg)	1988–08–08	Italy
SG	14	Gary Harris	6 ft 4 in (1.93 m)	210 lb (95 kg)	1994–09–14	Michigan State
C	15	Nikola Jokić	7 ft 0 in (2.13 m)	250 lb (113 kg)	1995–02–19	Serbia
C	77	Joffrey Lauvergne	7 ft 0 in (2.13 m)	260 lb (118 kg)	1991–09–30	France
SG	3	Mike Miller	6 ft 8 in (2.03 m)	218 lb (99 kg)	1980–02–19	Florida
SG	0	Emmanuel Mudiay	6 ft 5 in (1.96 m)	200 lb (91 kg)	1996–03–05	Prime Prep Academy (TX)
PG	1	Jameer Nelson	6 ft 0 in (1.83 m)	190 lb (86 kg)	1982–02–09	Saint Joseph's
C	23	Jusuf Nurkić	7 ft 0 in (2.13 m)	280 lb (127 kg)	1994–08–23	Bosnia and Herzegovina
SF	9	JaKarr Sampson	6 ft 9 in (2.06 m)	214 lb (97 kg)	1993–03–20	St. John's
SG	6	Axel Toupane	6 ft 7 in (2.01 m)	197 lb (89 kg)	1992–07–23	France

Coaches
Head coach
- Michael Malone
Assistant(s)
- Ryan Bowen
- Chris Fleming
- Noel Gillespie
- Micah Nori
- Ed Pinckney
- Wes Unseld, Jr.

Legend
- (DP) Unsigned draft pick
- (FA) Free agent
- (S) Suspended
- (DL) On assignment to D-League affiliate
- Injured

Roster
Updated: 2016–03–25

== Awards and honors ==
- Dikembe Mutombo would have his number 55 retired by the team around the start of the Denver Nuggets' season.

== Transactions ==
=== Trades ===
July 20, 2015	To Denver Nuggets (United States) Joey Dorsey (United States) Nick Johnson (Greece) Kostas Papanikolaou (Argentina) / (Italy) Pablo Prigioni Protected 1st-round pick in 2016 NBA draft Cash considerations	To Houston Rockets (United States) Ty Lawson 2nd-round pick in 2017 NBA draft
February 18, 2016	To Denver Nuggets (United States) D. J. Augustin (United States) Steve Novak Two 2nd–round picks in 2016 NBA draft Cash consideration	To Oklahoma City Thunder (United States) Randy Foye

=== Free agents ===
==== Signings ====
Player	Signed	Contract	Ref.
Wilson Chandler	July 11, 2015	Multi–year extension 4 years, $46.5 million	
Nikola Jokic	July 12, 2015	4 years, $5.5 million	
Jameer Nelson	July 12, 2015	3 years, $13.5 million	
Will Barton	July 23, 2015	3 years, $10.98 million	
Emmanuel Mudiay	July 27, 2015	Rookie Contract; 4 years, $14.02 million Team Option in 2017–18 & 2018–19	
Danilo Gallinari	August 2, 2015	Multi–year extension 3 years, $45.5 million Player Option for 2017–18	
Darrell Arthur	August 7, 2015	2 years, $5.75 million Player Option for 2016–17	
Devin Sweetney	September 15, 2015	1 year, $525,000; Non–guaranteed	
Matt Janning	September 15, 2015	1 year, $845,000; Non–guaranteed	
Oleksiy Pecherov	September 15, 2015	1 year, $981,000; Non–guaranteed	
Mike Miller	September 30, 2015	1 year, $1.5 million	
Kostas Papanikolaou	November 5, 2015	2 years, $1.78 million $350K guaranteed	
Sean Kilpatrick	January 12, 2016	10 days, $49,709	
Sean Kilpatrick	January 23, 2016	10 days, $49,709	
JaKarr Sampson	February 22, 2016	2 years, $1.27 million 2016–17 Non–guaranteed	
Axel Toupane	March 3, 2016	10 days, $30,888	
Axel Toupane	March 14, 2016	10 days, $30,888	
Axel Toupane	March 25, 2016	2 years, $939,500; 2016–17 Non–guaranteed	

==== Subtractions ====
Player	Reason left	Date	New team	Ref.
Ian Clark	Free Agency	July 11, 2015	Golden State Warriors	
Jamaal Franklin	Waived	July 12, 2015	(China) Guangdong Southern Tigers	
Pablo Prigioni	Waived	July 20, 2015	Los Angeles Clippers	
Joey Dorsey	Waived	August 18, 2015	(Turkey) Galatasaray	
Kostas Papanikolaou	Waived	September 25, 2015	Denver Nuggets	
Matt Janning	Waived	October 15, 2015	(Israel) Hapoel Jerusalem B.C.	
Devin Sweetney	Waived	October 23, 2015	(Mexico) Halcones Rojos Veracruz	
Oleksiy Pecherov	Waived	October 23, 2015	(Lebanon) Hekmeh BC	
Nick Johnson	Waived	October 24, 2015	Austin Spurs	
Erick Green	Waived	November 5, 2015	Reno Bighorns	
Kostas Papanikolaou	Waived	January 7, 2016	(Greece) Olympiacos B.C.	
Sean Kilpatrick	Free Agency	February 2, 2016	Delaware 87ers	
JJ Hickson	Waived	February 19, 2016	Washington Wizards	
Steve Novak	Waived	February 19, 2016	Milwaukee Bucks	
