= 2015–16 Los Angeles Lakers season =

NBA professional basketball team season

- Head coach: Byron Scott
- General manager: Mitch Kupchak
- Owners: Jerry Buss family trust
- Arena: Staples Center

Results
- Record: 17–65 (.207)
- Place: Division: 5th (Pacific); Conference: 15th (Western)
- Playoff finish: Did not qualify
- Stats at Basketball Reference

Local media
- Television: TWC SportsNet and TWC Deportes
- Radio: 710 ESPN

The 2015–16 Los Angeles Lakers season was the franchise's 68th season, its 67th season in the National Basketball Association (NBA), and its 56th in Los Angeles. The Lakers looked to rebound following its worst season in franchise history in 2014–15, but would finish with a new franchise-worst 17–65 record, which included a season-high and a record–tying, 10–game losing streak in January. During the 2015 offseason, Jordan Hill, Jeremy Lin, Wesley Johnson, Wayne Ellington, Carlos Boozer, Ronnie Price, and Ed Davis all left the team. The Lakers drafted D'Angelo Russell, Larry Nance Jr., and Anthony Brown in the 2015 NBA draft. Afterwards, the Lakers traded for former Pacers' center Roy Hibbert and signed for the reigning Sixth Man of the Year, Lou Williams, and forward Brandon Bass. Former Lakers forward, Metta World Peace, was brought back to the team as well after the Lakers amnestied him in 2013.

This was Kobe Bryant's final season with the team and in the NBA after he announced his retirement. Playing 20 years in the league, Bryant won five championships, two Finals MVPs, and an MVP with the Lakers and is widely regarded as one of the greatest basketball players of all time.

Following the season, Byron Scott was fired as head coach after two seasons with the team and replaced by Golden State Warriors assistant and former Lakers player Luke Walton, who played for the Lakers from 2003 to 2012.

== Draft ==
Round	Pick	Player	Position	Nationality	College
1	2	D'Angelo Russell	PG	United States	Ohio State
1	27	Larry Nance Jr.	PF	United States	Wyoming
2	34	Anthony Brown	SF	United States	Stanford

== Roster ==
2015–16 Los Angeles Lakers roster
Players

Pos.	No.	Player	Height	Weight	DOB	From
PF	2	Brandon Bass	6 ft 8 in (2.03 m)	250 lb (113 kg)	1985–04–30	LSU
C	28	Tarik Black	6 ft 9 in (2.06 m)	250 lb (113 kg)	1991–11–22	Kansas
SF	3	Anthony Brown	6 ft 7 in (2.01 m)	211 lb (96 kg)	1992–10–10	Stanford
SF	24	Kobe Bryant	6 ft 6 in (1.98 m)	212 lb (96 kg)	1978–08–23	Lower Merion HS (PA)
SG	6	Jordan Clarkson	6 ft 5 in (1.96 m)	185 lb (84 kg)	1992–06–07	Missouri
C	17	Roy Hibbert	7 ft 2 in (2.18 m)	275 lb (125 kg)	1986–12–11	Georgetown
PG	9	Marcelo Huertas	6 ft 3 in (1.91 m)	185 lb (84 kg)	1983–05–25	Coppell HS (TX)
PF	4	Ryan Kelly	6 ft 11 in (2.11 m)	230 lb (104 kg)	1991–04–09	Duke
PF	7	Larry Nance Jr.	6 ft 9 in (2.06 m)	230 lb (104 kg)	1993–01–01	Wyoming
PF	30	Julius Randle	6 ft 9 in (2.06 m)	250 lb (113 kg)	1994–11–29	Kentucky
PG	1	D'Angelo Russell	6 ft 5 in (1.96 m)	195 lb (88 kg)	1996–02–23	Ohio State
C	50	Robert Sacre	7 ft 0 in (2.13 m)	270 lb (122 kg)	1989–06–06	Gonzaga
SG	23	Lou Williams	6 ft 1 in (1.85 m)	175 lb (79 kg)	1986–10–27	South Gwinnett HS (GA)
SF	37	Metta World Peace	6 ft 7 in (2.01 m)	260 lb (118 kg)	1979–11–13	St. John's
SG	0	Nick Young	6 ft 7 in (2.01 m)	210 lb (95 kg)	1985–06–01	USC

Coaches
Head coach
- Byron Scott
Assistant(s)
- Jim Eyen
- Mark Madsen
- Paul Pressey
- Larry Lewis (player development)
- Tracy Murray (assistant coach/shooting consultant)
- Clay Moser (assistant coach/basketball strategy)

Legend
- (DP) Unsigned draft pick
- (FA) Free agent
- (S) Suspended
- (DL) On assignment to D-League affiliate
- Injured

Roster
Updated: 2016–04–13

== Standings ==
=== Division ===
Pacific Division	W	L	PCT	GB	Home	Road	Div	GP
z – Golden State Warriors	73	9	.890	–	39‍–‍2	34‍–‍7	15–1	82
x – Los Angeles Clippers	53	29	.646	20.0	29‍–‍12	24‍–‍17	9–7	82
e – Sacramento Kings	33	49	.402	40.0	18‍–‍23	15‍–‍26	8–8	82
e – Phoenix Suns	23	59	.280	50.0	14‍–‍27	9‍–‍32	6–10	82
e – Los Angeles Lakers	17	65	.207	56.0	12‍–‍29	5‍–‍36	2–14	82

=== Conference ===
Western Conference
#	Team	W	L	PCT	GB	GP
1	z – Golden State Warriors *	73	9	.890	–	82
2	y – San Antonio Spurs *	67	15	.817	6.0	82
3	y – Oklahoma City Thunder *	55	27	.671	18.0	82
4	x – Los Angeles Clippers	53	29	.646	20.0	82
5	x – Portland Trail Blazers	44	38	.537	29.0	82
6	x – Dallas Mavericks	42	40	.512	31.0	82
7	x – Memphis Grizzlies	42	40	.512	31.0	82
8	x – Houston Rockets	41	41	.500	32.0	82
9	e – Utah Jazz	40	42	.488	33.0	82
10	e – Sacramento Kings	33	49	.402	40.0	82
11	e – Denver Nuggets	33	49	.402	40.0	82
12	e – New Orleans Pelicans	30	52	.366	43.0	82
13	e – Minnesota Timberwolves	29	53	.354	44.0	82
14	e – Phoenix Suns	23	59	.280	50.0	82
15	e – Los Angeles Lakers	17	65	.207	56.0	82

== Preseason ==
2015 pre-season game log
Total: 3–5 (Home: 3–5; Road: 0–0)
Pre-season: 3–5 (home: 3–5; road: 0–0)

Game	Date	Team	Score	High points	High rebounds	High assists	Location Attendance	Record
1	October 4	Utah	71–90	Lou Williams (14)	Roy Hibbert (10)	Lou Williams (4)	Stan Sheriff Center; 10,300	0–1
2	October 7	Utah	114–117 (OT)	Lou Williams (20)	Roy Hibbert (11)	Julius Randle (4)	Stan Sheriff Center; 10,300	0–2
3	October 8	Toronto	97–105	Lou Williams (19)	Jonathan Holmes (6)	Jordan Clarkson (6)	Citizens Business Bank Arena; 8,123	0–3
4	October 11	Maccabi Haifa	126–83	Kobe Bryant (21)	Roy Hibbert (16)	D'Angelo Russell (11)	Staples Center; 14,810	1–3
5	October 13	Sacramento	100–107	Jordan Clarkson (17)	Roy Hibbert (10)	Julius Randle (6)	MGM Grand Garden Arena; 11,618	1–4
6	October 17	Golden State	85–70	Jordan Clarkson (17)	Roy Hibbert (6)	Marcelo Huertas (6)	Valley View Casino Center; 14,100	2–4
7	October 19	Portland	104–102	Jordan Clarkson (17)	Black, Randle, Upshaw (6)	Marcelo Huertas (8)	Staples Center; 15,123	3–4
8	October 22	Golden State	97–136	Lou Williams (19)	Roy Hibbert (10)	D'Angelo Russell (4)	Honda Center; 16,222	3–5

2015–16 season schedule

== Regular season game log ==
2015–16 game log
Total: 17–65 (Home: 12–29; Road: 5–36)
October: 0–2 (home: 0–1; road: 0–1)

Game	Date	Team	Score	High points	High rebounds	High assists	Location Attendance	Record
1	October 28	Minnesota	L 111–112	Kobe Bryant (24)	Julius Randle (11)	Roy Hibbert (4)	Staples Center; 18,997	0–1
2	October 30	@ Sacramento	L 114–132	Jordan Clarkson (22)	Ryan Kelly (6)	Lou Williams (5)	Sleep Train Arena; 17,391	0–2

November : 2–12 (home: 1–5; road: 1–7)

Game	Date	Team	Score	High points	High rebounds	High assists	Location Attendance	Record
3	November 1	Dallas	L 93–103	Julius Randle (22)	Julius Randle (15)	Julius Randle (4)	Staples Center; 18,997	0–3
4	November 3	Denver	L 109–120	Jordan Clarkson (30)	Tarik Black (8)	D'Angelo Russell (6)	Staples Center; 18,997	0–4
5	November 6	@ Brooklyn	W 104–98	Kobe Bryant (18)	Hibbert, Randle (7)	Bryant, Clarkson, Randle, Williams (3)	Barclays Center; 17,732	1–4
6	November 8	@ New York	L 95–99	Bryant, Hibbert (18)	Julius Randle (11)	Lou Williams (5)	Madison Square Garden; 19,812	1–5
7	November 10	@ Miami	L 88–101	Nick Young (17)	Black, Randle (7)	Huertas, Randle, Russell (4)	American Airlines Arena; 19,825	1–6
8	November 11	@ Orlando	L 99–101	Roy Hibbert (15)	Julius Randle (8)	Clarkson, Huertas (5)	Amway Center; 18,846	1–7
9	November 13	@ Dallas	L 82–90	Jordan Clarkson (21)	Bass, Randle (10)	D'Angelo Russell (5)	American Airlines Center; 20,260	1–8
10	November 15	Detroit	W 97–85	Bryant, Clarkson (17)	Bryant, Randle (8)	Kobe Bryant (9)	Staples Center; 18,997	2–8
11	November 16	@ Phoenix	L 101–120	Jordan Clarkson (20)	Roy Hibbert (6)	Roy Hibbert (3)	Talking Stick Resort Arena; 18,055	2–9
12	November 20	Toronto	L 91–102	Julius Randle (18)	Julius Randle (12)	Kobe Bryant (5)	Staples Center; 18,997	2–10
13	November 22	Portland	L 93–107	Jordan Clarkson (19)	Julius Randle (13)	D'Angelo Russell (6)	Staples Center; 18,997	2–11
14	November 24	@ Golden State	L 77–111	Nance, Randle, Williams (10)	Black, Bryant, Hibbert, Randle (6)	Metta World Peace (3)	Oracle Arena; 19,596	2–12
15	November 28	@ Portland	L 96–108	Kobe Bryant (21)	Hibbert, Randle (6)	D'Angelo Russell (5)	Moda Center; 20,019	2–13
16	November 29	Indiana	L 103–107	Jordan Clarkson, Young (22)	Julius Randle (11)	Jordan Clarkson (6)	Staples Center; 18,997	2–14

December : 4–13 (home: 1–3; road: 3–10)

Game	Date	Team	Score	High points	High rebounds	High assists	Location Attendance	Record
17	December 1	@ Philadelphia	L 91–103	Kobe Bryant (20)	Julius Randle (11)	D'Angelo Russell (4)	Wells Fargo Center; 20,510	2–15
18	December 2	@ Washington	W 108–104	Kobe Bryant (31)	Julius Randle (19)	Lou Williams (4)	Verizon Center; 20,356	3–15
19	December 4	@ Atlanta	L 87–100	Lou Williams (18)	D'Angelo Russell (10)	Kobe Bryant (5)	Philips Arena; 19,051	3–16
20	December 6	@ Detroit	L 91–111	Lou Williams (21)	Julius Randle (11)	Marcelo Huertas (4)	The Palace of Auburn Hills; 16,394	3–17
21	December 7	@ Toronto	L 93–102	Kobe Bryant (21)	Julius Randle (11)	Bryant, Hibbert (4)	Air Canada Centre; 20,163	3–18
22	December 9	@ Minnesota	L 122–123 (OT)	D'Angelo Russell (23)	Julius Randle (12)	Lou Williams (5)	Target Center; 18,076	3–19
23	December 11	@ San Antonio	L 87–109	D'Angelo Russell (24)	Julius Randle (7)	D'Angelo Russell (6)	AT&T Center; 18,418	3–20
24	December 12	@ Houston	L 97–126	Kobe Bryant (25)	Julius Randle (10)	Kobe Bryant (6)	Toyota Center; 18,456	3–21
25	December 15	Milwaukee	W 113–95	Kobe Bryant (22)	Roy Hibbert (11)	D'Angelo Russell (7)	Staples Center; 18,997	4–21
26	December 17	Houston	L 87–107	Kobe Bryant (22)	Julius Randle (10)	D'Angelo Russell (7)	Staples Center; 18,997	4–22
27	December 19	@ Oklahoma City	L 78–118	Lou Williams (20)	Randle, Russell (7)	D'Angelo Russell (5)	Chesapeake Energy Arena; 18,203	4–23
28	December 22	@ Denver	W 111–107	Kobe Bryant (31)	Julius Randle (10)	Bryant, Williams (5)	Pepsi Center; 19,124	5–23
29	December 23	Oklahoma City	L 85–120	Kobe Bryant (19)	Bass, Clarkson, Sacre (6)	Marcelo Huertas (4)	Staples Center; 18,997	5–24
30	December 25	LA Clippers	L 84–94	D'Angelo Russell (16)	Julius Randle (8)	Bryant, Clarkson (4)	Staples Center; 18,997	5–25
31	December 27	@ Memphis	L 96–112	Kobe Bryant (19)	Larry Nance Jr. (11)	Clarkson, Russell (3)	FedEx Forum; 18,119	5–26
32	December 28	@ Charlotte	L 98–108	Kobe Bryant (20)	Roy Hibbert (8)	Lou Williams (7)	Time Warner Cable Arena; 19,632	5–27
33	December 30	@ Boston	W 112–104	Jordan Clarkson (24)	Julius Randle (12)	Julius Randle (4)	TD Garden; 18,624	6–27

January : 3–14 (home: 3–9; road: 0–5)

Game	Date	Team	Score	High points	High rebounds	High assists	Location Attendance	Record
34	January 1	Philadelphia	W 93–84	Lou Williams (24)	Larry Nance Jr. (14)	Russell, Williams (5)	Staples Center; 18,997	7–27
35	January 3	Phoenix	W 97–77	Lou Williams (30)	Larry Nance Jr. (14)	Jordan Clarkson (7)	Staples Center; 18,997	8–27
36	January 5	Golden State	L 88–109	Jordan Clarkson (23)	Julius Randle (9)	Marcelo Huertas (5)	Staples Center; 18,997	8–28
37	January 7	@ Sacramento	L 115–118	Kobe Bryant (28)	Julius Randle (10)	Bass, Clarkson, Russell (4)	Sleep Train Arena; 17,386	8–29
38	January 8	Oklahoma City	L 113–117	Lou Williams (44)	Julius Randle (8)	Kobe Bryant (6)	Staples Center; 18,997	8–30
39	January 10	Utah	L 74–86	Lou Williams (18)	Larry Nance Jr. (11)	Lou Williams (6)	Staples Center; 18,997	8–31
40	January 12	New Orleans	W 95–91	Lou Williams (19)	Julius Randle (11)	Lou Williams (8)	Staples Center; 18,997	9–31
41	January 14	@ Golden State	L 98–116	Jordan Clarkson (22)	Julius Randle (9)	Bryant, Randle, Russell, Williams (3)	Oracle Arena; 19,596	9–32
42	January 16	@ Utah	L 82–109	Lou Williams (20)	Anthony Brown (7)	D'Angelo Russell (4)	Vivint Smart Home Arena; 19,911	9–33
43	January 17	Houston	L 95–112	Lou Williams (20)	Julius Randle (11)	Kobe Bryant (9)	Staples Center; 18,997	9–34
44	January 20	Sacramento	L 93–112	Brandon Bass (18)	Julius Randle (12)	D'Angelo Russell (5)	Staples Center; 18,997	9–35
45	January 22	San Antonio	L 95–108	D'Angelo Russell (18)	Julius Randle (14)	Kobe Bryant (6)	Staples Center; 18,997	9–36
46	January 23	@ Portland	L 103–121	D'Angelo Russell (21)	Julius Randle (9)	Clarkson, Williams (3)	Moda Center; 19,728	9–37
47	January 26	Dallas	L 90–92	Jordan Clarkson (18)	Julius Randle (11)	Jordan Clarkson (7)	Staples Center; 18,997	9–38
48	January 28	Chicago	L 91–114	Jordan Clarkson (16)	Julius Randle (8)	Clarkson, Russell (4)	Staples Center; 18,997	9–39
49	January 29	@ LA Clippers	L 93–105	Julius Randle (20)	Julius Randle (14)	D'Angelo Russell (5)	Staples Center; 19,495	9–40
50	January 31	Charlotte	L 82–101	Kobe Bryant (23)	Julius Randle (11)	Kobe Bryant (3)	Staples Center; 18,997	9–41

February : 2–8 (home: 1–2; road: 1–6)

Game	Date	Team	Score	High points	High rebounds	High assists	Location Attendance	Record
51	February 2	Minnesota	W 119–115	Kobe Bryant (38)	Julius Randle (12)	Kobe Bryant (5)	Staples Center; 18,997	10–41
52	February 4	@ New Orleans	W 99–96	Kobe Bryant (27)	Kobe Bryant (12)	Randle, Russell (3)	Smoothie King Center; 18,420	11–41
53	February 6	@ San Antonio	L 102–106	Kobe Bryant (25)	Julius Randle (17)	Bryant, Clarkson, Randle, Williams (4)	AT&T Center; 18,418	11–42
54	February 8	@ Indiana	L 87–89	Kobe Bryant (19)	Julius Randle (19)	D'Angelo Russell (6)	Bankers Life Fieldhouse; 18,165	11–43
55	February 10	@ Cleveland	L 111–120	Lou Williams (28)	Julius Randle (8)	Jordan Clarkson (7)	Quicken Loans Arena; 20,562	11–44
All-Star Break
56	February 19	San Antonio	L 113–119	Kobe Bryant (25)	Julius Randle (15)	Jordan Clarkson (6)	Staples Center; 18,997	11–45
57	February 21	@ Chicago	L 115–126	Bryant, Randle (22)	Julius Randle (12)	D'Angelo Russell (6)	United Center; 23,143	11–46
58	February 22	@ Milwaukee	L 101–108	Nick Young (19)	Julius Randle (7)	Russell, Williams (4)	BMO Harris Bradley Center; 11,639	11–47
59	February 24	@ Memphis	L 119–128	Jordan Clarkson (28)	Julius Randle (14)	D'Angelo Russell (8)	FedExForum; 18,119	11–48
60	February 26	Memphis	L 95–112	D'Angelo Russell (22)	Julius Randle (7)	Russell, Williams (3)	Staples Center; 18,997	11–49

March : 5–10 (home: 5–7; road: 0–3)

Game	Date	Team	Score	High points	High rebounds	High assists	Location Attendance	Record
61	March 1	Brooklyn	W 107–101	D'Angelo Russell (39)	Julius Randle (13)	Jordan Clarkson (7)	Staples Center; 18,997	12–49
62	March 2	@ Denver	L 107–117	D'Angelo Russell (24)	Black, Randle (7)	Marcelo Huertas (8)	Pepsi Center; 20,096	12–50
63	March 4	Atlanta	L 77–106	Julius Randle (16)	Julius Randle (10)	D'Angelo Russell (5)	Staples Center; 18,997	12–51
64	March 6	Golden State	W 112–95	Jordan Clarkson (25)	Julius Randle (14)	Marcelo Huertas (9)	Staples Center; 18,997	13–51
65	March 8	Orlando	W 107–98	D'Angelo Russell (27)	Julius Randle (11)	Marcelo Huertas (5)	Staples Center; 18,997	14–51
66	March 10	Cleveland	L 108–120	Kobe Bryant (26)	Julius Randle (9)	Huertas, Russell (5)	Staples Center; 18,997	14–52
67	March 13	New York	L 87–90	Lou Williams (15)	Julius Randle (8)	Lou Williams (5)	Staples Center; 18,997	14–53
68	March 15	Sacramento	L 98–106	Lou Williams (17)	Julius Randle (11)	Marcelo Huertas (6)	Staples Center; 18,997	14–54
69	March 18	Phoenix	L 90–95	Lou Williams (30)	Julius Randle (9)	Marcelo Huertas (10)	Staples Center; 18,997	14–55
70	March 22	Memphis	W 107–100	Jordan Clarkson (22)	Julius Randle (14)	Marcelo Huertas (7)	Staples Center; 18,997	15–55
71	March 23	@ Phoenix	L 107–119	Julius Randle (19)	Julius Randle (15)	Lou Williams (5)	Talking Stick Resort Arena; 18,191	15–56
72	March 25	Denver	L 105–116	Kobe Bryant (28)	Julius Randle (18)	Julius Randle (10)	Staples Center; 18,997	15–57
73	March 27	Washington	L 88–101	D'Angelo Russell (22)	Bass, Nance, Randle (7)	Bass, Clarkson, Huertas (3)	Staples Center; 18,997	15–58
74	March 28	@ Utah	L 75–123	Lou Williams (16)	Jordan Clarkson (8)	Bryant, Clarkson, Huertas (2)	Vivint Smart Home Arena; 19,911	15–59
75	March 30	Miami	W 102–100 (OT)	Jordan Clarkson (26)	Julius Randle (14)	Marcelo Huertas (4)	Staples Center; 18,997	16–59

April : 1–6 (home: 1–2; road: 0–4)

Game	Date	Team	Score	High points	High rebounds	High assists	Location Attendance	Record
76	April 3	Boston	L 100–107	Kobe Bryant (34)	Julius Randle (10)	D'Angelo Russell (6)	Staples Center; 18,997	16–60
77	April 5	@ LA Clippers	L 81–103	Metta World Peace (17)	Julius Randle (12)	Julius Randle (4)	Staples Center; 19,537	16–61
78	April 6	LA Clippers	L 81–91	Kobe Bryant (17)	Julius Randle (20)	Marcelo Huertas (5)	Staples Center; 18,997	16–62
79	April 8	@ New Orleans	L 102–110	D'Angelo Russell (32)	Roy Hibbert (6)	Julius Randle (6)	Smoothie King Center; 18,607	16–63
80	April 10	@ Houston	L 110–130	Kobe Bryant (35)	Jordan Clarkson (8)	Marcelo Huertas (7)	Toyota Center; 18,442	16–64
81	April 11	@ Oklahoma City	L 79–112	Kobe Bryant (13)	Julius Randle (13)	Marcelo Huertas (5)	Chesapeake Energy Arena; 18,203	16–65
82	April 13	Utah	W 101–96	Kobe Bryant (60)	Julius Randle (9)	Marcelo Huertas (6)	Staples Center; 18,997	17–65

2015–16 season schedule

== Player statistics ==
Legend
GP	Games played	GS	Games started	MPG	Minutes per game
FG%	Field-goal percentage	3P%	3-point field-goal percentage	FT%	Free-throw percentage
RPG	Rebounds per game	APG	Assists per game	SPG	Steals per game
BPG	Blocks per game	PPG	Points per game

=== Regular season ===
Bold – Leaders (Qualified)
* – Recorded statistics when playing for Los Angeles

Player	GP	GS	MPG	FG%	3P%	FT%	RPG	APG	SPG	BPG	PPG
Brandon Bass	66	0	20.3	**.549**	.000	.845	4.3	1.1	.5	.8	7.2
Tarik Black	39	0	12.7	.548	.000	.422	4.0	.4	.4	.5	3.4
Anthony Brown	29	11	20.7	.310	.286	.850	2.4	.7	.5	.2	4.0
Kobe Bryant	66	66	28.2	.358	.285	.826	3.7	2.8	.9	.2	**17.6**
Jordan Clarkson	79	79	**32.3**	.433	.347	.804	4.0	2.4	1.1	.1	15.5
Roy Hibbert	**81**	**81**	23.2	.443	.000	.807	4.9	1.2	.4	**1.4**	5.9
Marcelo Huertas	53	0	16.4	.422	.262	**.931**	1.7	**3.4**	.5	.1	4.5
Ryan Kelly	36	0	13.1	.369	.135	.685	3.4	.6	.4	.3	4.2
Larry Nance Jr.	63	22	20.1	.527	.100	.681	5.0	.7	.9	.4	5.5
Julius Randle	**81**	60	28.2	.429	.278	.715	**10.2**	1.8	.7	.4	11.3
D'Angelo Russell	80	48	28.2	.410	**.351**	.737	3.4	3.3	**1.2**	.2	13.2
Robert Sacre	25	1	12.8	.413	.000	.658	2.9	.6	.2	.4	3.5
Lou Williams	67	35	28.5	.408	.344	.830	2.5	2.5	.9	.3	15.3
Metta World Peace	35	5	16.9	.311	.310	.702	2.5	.8	.6	.3	5.0
Nick Young	54	2	19.1	.339	.325	.829	1.8	.6	.4	.1	7.3

== Transactions ==
=== Trades ===
July 9, 2015	To Los Angeles Lakers Roy Hibbert	To Indiana Pacers 2019 Second Round Draft Pick

=== Free agents ===
==== Additions ====
Player	Signed	Former Team
Brandon Bass	Signed 2-year contract worth $6 million	Boston Celtics
Lou Williams	Signed 3-year contract worth $21 million	Toronto Raptors
Metta World Peace	Signed 1-year deal	(Italy) Pallacanestro Cantù

==== Subtractions ====
Player	Reason Left	New Team
Ed Davis	Signed 3-year contract worth $20 million	Portland Trail Blazers
Jeremy Lin	Signed 2-year contract worth $4.3 million	Charlotte Hornets
Wesley Johnson	Signed 2-year contract worth $2.3 million	Los Angeles Clippers
Wayne Ellington	Signed 2-year contract worth $3 million	Brooklyn Nets
Jordan Hill	Signed 1-year contract worth $4 million	Indiana Pacers
Ronnie Price	Signed 1-year contract worth $1.5 million	Phoenix Suns
Carlos Boozer	Free Agency	(China) Guangdong Southern Tigers
