= 2015–16 Houston Rockets season =

NBA professional basketball team season

- Head coach: Kevin McHale (fired); J. B. Bickerstaff (interim)
- General manager: Daryl Morey
- Owners: Leslie Alexander
- Arena: Toyota Center

Results
- Record: 41–41 (.500)
- Place: Division: 4th (Southwest); Conference: 8th (Western)
- Playoff finish: First Round (lost to Warriors 1–4)
- Stats at Basketball Reference

Local media
- Television: Root Sports Southwest
- Radio: Sportstalk 790

The 2015–16 Houston Rockets season was the 49th season of the franchise in the National Basketball Association (NBA), and their 45th in the Houston area.

On November 18, 2015, coach Kevin McHale was fired in his fifth season as the Rockets coach after a 4–7 start to the season. J. B. Bickerstaff was named the interim coach.

The Rockets finished the regular season with a 41–41 record, finishing 8th in the Western Conference. The Rockets' season ended with a 4–1 loss in the First Round to the Golden State Warriors. Following the season, Dwight Howard left to sign with his hometown Atlanta Hawks.

== Draft picks ==
Round	Pick	Player	Position	Nationality	College
1	18	Sam Dekker	SF	United States	Wisconsin
2	32	Montrezl Harrell	PF	United States	Louisville

== Standings ==
Western Conference
#	Team	W	L	PCT	GB	GP
1	z – Golden State Warriors *	73	9	.890	–	82
2	y – San Antonio Spurs *	67	15	.817	6.0	82
3	y – Oklahoma City Thunder *	55	27	.671	18.0	82
4	x – Los Angeles Clippers	53	29	.646	20.0	82
5	x – Portland Trail Blazers	44	38	.537	29.0	82
6	x – Dallas Mavericks	42	40	.512	31.0	82
7	x – Memphis Grizzlies	42	40	.512	31.0	82
8	x – Houston Rockets	41	41	.500	32.0	82
9	e – Utah Jazz	40	42	.488	33.0	82
10	e – Sacramento Kings	33	49	.402	40.0	82
11	e – Denver Nuggets	33	49	.402	40.0	82
12	e – New Orleans Pelicans	30	52	.366	43.0	82
13	e – Minnesota Timberwolves	29	53	.354	44.0	82
14	e – Phoenix Suns	23	59	.280	50.0	82
15	e – Los Angeles Lakers	17	65	.207	56.0	82

Southwest Division	W	L	PCT	GB	Home	Road	Div	GP
y – San Antonio Spurs	67	15	.817	–	40‍–‍1	27‍–‍14	15–1	82
x – Dallas Mavericks	42	40	.512	25.0	23‍–‍18	19‍–‍22	7–9	82
x – Memphis Grizzlies	42	40	.512	25.0	26‍–‍15	16‍–‍25	7–9	82
x – Houston Rockets	41	41	.500	26.0	23‍–‍18	18‍–‍23	8–8	82
e – New Orleans Pelicans	30	52	.366	37.0	21‍–‍20	9‍–‍32	4–12	82

== Game log ==
=== Preseason ===
2015 pre-season game log
Total: 3–5 (home: 2–2; road: 1–3)
Pre-season: 3–5 (home: 2–2; road: 1–3)

Game	Date	Team	Score	High points	High rebounds	High assists	Location Attendance	Record
1	October 6	@ Memphis	L 89–92	Trevor Ariza (12)	Dwight Howard (11)	Will Cummings (3)	FedExForum; 12,826	0–1
2	October 7	Dallas	W 109–82	James Harden (19)	Clint Capela (14)	McDaniels, Harden (5)	Toyota Center; 16,839	1–1
3	October 11	Orlando	L 119–123	Corey Brewer (20)	Capela, Smith (7)	Ariza, Beverley, Harden (4)	State Farm Arena; 6,130	1–2
4	October 13	@ Phoenix	W 135–129 (OT)	Terrence Jones (23)	Clint Capela (10)	Patrick Beverley (5)	US Airways Center; 12,657	2–2
5	October 15	@ Golden State	L 101–123	K. J. McDaniels (20)	Chris Walker (9)	Cummings, Beverley (6)	Oracle Arena; 19,596	2–3
6	October 17	Miami	L 100–105	Trevor Ariza (21)	Terrence Jones (12)	Terrence Jones (6)	Toyota Center; 18,334	2–4
7	October 19	New Orleans	W 120–100	James Harden (20)	Clint Capela (12)	Ty Lawson (5)	Toyota Center; 16,678	3–4
8	October 23	@ San Antonio	L 86–111	James Harden (17)	Harden, Jones (8)	James Harden (9)	AT&T Center; 18,059	3–5

2015–16 season schedule

=== Regular season ===
2015–16 game log
Total: 41–41 (home: 23–18; road: 18–23)
October: 0–2 (home: 0–2; road: 0–0)

Game	Date	Team	Score	High points	High rebounds	High assists	Location Attendance	Record
1	October 28	Denver	L 85–105	James Harden (22)	Patrick Beverley (8)	Harden, Lawson (6)	Toyota Center; 18,240	0–1
2	October 30	Golden State	L 92–112	Montrezl Harrell (17)	Clint Capela (8)	Harden, Lawson (5)	Toyota Center; 18,142	0–2

November : 7–9 (home: 4–5; road: 3–4)

Game	Date	Team	Score	High points	High rebounds	High assists	Location Attendance	Record
3	November 1	@ Miami	L 89–109	Marcus Thornton (21)	Trevor Ariza (7)	James Harden (7)	American Airlines Arena; 19,600	0–3
4	November 2	Oklahoma City	W 110–105	James Harden (37)	Dwight Howard (8)	Ty Lawson (11)	Toyota Center; 17,224	1–3
5	November 4	Orlando	W 119–114 (OT)	James Harden (28)	Dwight Howard (14)	Ty Lawson (8)	Toyota Center; 16,735	2–3
6	November 6	@ Sacramento	W 116–110	James Harden (43)	Clint Capela (12)	James Harden (13)	Sleep Train Arena; 16,983	3–3
7	November 7	@ L.A. Clippers	W 109–105	James Harden (46)	Dwight Howard (20)	Ty Lawson (4)	Staples Center; 19,361	4–3
8	November 11	Brooklyn	L 98–106	Dwight Howard (20)	Dwight Howard (17)	Marcus Thornton (7)	Toyota Center; 18,155	4–4
9	November 13	@ Denver	L 98–107	James Harden (28)	Dwight Howard (10)	Ty Lawson (7)	Pepsi Center; 16,113	4–5
10	November 14	Dallas	L 98–110	James Harden (25)	Clint Capela (10)	James Harden (10)	Toyota Center; 18,231	4–6
11	November 16	Boston	L 95–111	Trevor Ariza (19)	Dwight Howard (12)	James Harden (5)	Toyota Center; 17,005	4–7
12	November 18	Portland	W 108–103 (OT)	James Harden (45)	Dwight Howard (19)	James Harden (11)	Toyota Center; 17,107	5–7
13	November 20	@ Memphis	L 84–96	James Harden (22)	Dwight Howard (15)	James Harden (5)	FedExForum; 17,555	5–8
14	November 21	New York	L 102–107	James Harden (24)	Clint Capela (14)	James Harden (10)	Toyota Center; 18,226	5–9
15	November 25	Memphis	L 93–102	James Harden (40)	Trevor Ariza (12)	James Harden (5)	Toyota Center; 18,143	5–10
16	November 27	Philadelphia	W 116–114	James Harden (50)	Dwight Howard (13)	James Harden (8)	Toyota Center; 17,306	6–10
17	November 29	@ New York	W 116–111 (OT)	James Harden (26)	Clint Capela (11)	James Harden (9)	Madison Square Garden; 19,812	7–10
18	November 30	@ Detroit	L 105–116	James Harden (29)	Dwight Howard (10)	James Harden (7)	The Palace of Auburn Hills; 14,818	7–11

December : 9–7 (home: 6–2; road: 3–5)

Game	Date	Team	Score	High points	High rebounds	High assists	Location Attendance	Record
19	December 2	New Orleans	W 108–101	James Harden (24)	Dwight Howard (16)	Harden, Lawson (6)	Toyota Center; 17,339	8–11
20	December 4	@ Dallas	W 100–96	James Harden (25)	Clint Capela (10)	James Harden (9)	American Airlines Center; 20,339	9–11
21	December 5	Sacramento	W 120–113	James Harden (31)	Dwight Howard (18)	James Harden (9)	Toyota Center; 17,318	10–11
22	December 8	@ Brooklyn	L 105–110	Marcus Thornton (32)	Capela, Howard (9)	James Harden (9)	Barclays Center; 13,319	10–12
23	December 9	@ Washington	W 109–103	James Harden (42)	Harden, Howard (9)	James Harden (9)	Verizon Center; 16,041	11–12
24	December 12	L.A. Lakers	W 126–97	James Harden (30)	Dwight Howard (12)	Ty Lawson (8)	Toyota Center; 18,456	12–12
25	December 14	@ Denver	L 108–114	James Harden (24)	Dwight Howard (8)	Patrick Beverley (8)	Pepsi Center; 12,022	12–13
26	December 15	@ Sacramento	L 97–107	James Harden (33)	Clint Capela (9)	James Harden (6)	Sleep Train Arena; 17,317	12–14
27	December 17	@ L.A. Lakers	W 107–87	James Harden (25)	Dwight Howard (15)	James Harden (6)	Staples Center; 18,997	13–14
28	December 19	L.A. Clippers	W 107–97	Dwight Howard (22)	Dwight Howard (14)	James Harden (6)	Toyota Center; 18,212	14–14
29	December 21	Charlotte	W 102–95	James Harden (36)	Dwight Howard (9)	James Harden (7)	Toyota Center; 18,236	15–14
30	December 23	@ Orlando	L 101–104	James Harden (31)	Trevor Ariza (8)	James Harden (7)	Amway Center; 17,061	15–15
31	December 25	San Antonio	W 88–84	James Harden (20)	Dwight Howard (12)	James Harden (9)	Toyota Center; 18,319	16–15
32	December 26	@ New Orleans	L 108–110	James Harden (25)	Dwight Howard (9)	Harden, Lawson (5)	Smoothie King Center; 18,248	16–16
33	December 29	Atlanta	L 115–121	Dwight Howard (30)	Dwight Howard (16)	James Harden (8)	Toyota Center; 18,211	16–17
34	December 31	Golden State	L 110–114	James Harden (30)	Dwight Howard (13)	Harden, Howard (5)	Toyota Center; 18,313	16–18

January : 9–7 (home: 5–3; road: 4–4)

Game	Date	Team	Score	High points	High rebounds	High assists	Location Attendance	Record
35	January 2	@ San Antonio	L 103–121	Dwight Howard (22)	Dwight Howard (12)	Patrick Beverley (7)	AT&T Center; 18,652	16–19
36	January 4	@ Utah	W 93–91	James Harden (30)	Dwight Howard (13)	James Harden (7)	Vivint Smart Home Arena; 17,912	17–19
37	January 7	Utah	W 103–94	James Harden (33)	Clint Capela (10)	Patrick Beverley (4)	Toyota Center; 18,155	18–19
38	January 10	Indiana	W 107–103 (OT)	Harden, Howard (21)	Dwight Howard (17)	James Harden (9)	Toyota Center; 18,133	19–19
39	January 12	@ Memphis	W 107–91	James Harden (25)	Dwight Howard (14)	Jason Terry (6)	FedExForum; 16,044	20–19
40	January 13	Minnesota	W 107–104	James Harden (27)	Dwight Howard (10)	James Harden (11)	Toyota Center; 17,115	21–19
41	January 15	Cleveland	L 77–91	Dwight Howard (14)	Dwight Howard (11)	James Harden (5)	Toyota Center; 18,320	21–20
42	January 17	@ L.A. Lakers	W 112–95	James Harden (31)	Dwight Howard (15)	Harden, Lawson (5)	Staples Center; 18,997	22–20
43	January 18	@ L.A. Clippers	L 132–140 (OT)	Dwight Howard (36)	Dwight Howard (26)	James Harden (8)	Staples Center; 19,060	22–21
44	January 20	Detroit	L 114–123	James Harden (33)	James Harden (17)	James Harden (14)	Toyota Center; 17,203	22–22
45	January 22	Milwaukee	W 102–98	James Harden (30)	Clint Capela (9)	James Harden (8)	Toyota Center; 17,196	23–22
46	January 24	Dallas	W 115–104	James Harden (23)	James Harden (15)	James Harden (10)	Toyota Center; 18,142	24–22
47	January 25	@ New Orleans	W 112–111	James Harden (35)	James Harden (11)	James Harden (8)	Smoothie King Center; 15,688	25–22
48	January 27	@ San Antonio	L 99–130	James Harden (20)	Dwight Howard (8)	Marcus Thornton (3)	AT&T Center; 18,418	25–23
49	January 29	@ Oklahoma City	L 108–116	James Harden (33)	Dwight Howard (8)	James Harden (7)	Chesapeake Energy Arena; 18,203	25–24
50	January 30	Washington	L 122–123	James Harden (40)	Ariza, Harden, Howard (7)	James Harden (11)	Toyota Center; 18,320	25–25

February : 4–6 (home: 1–2; road: 3–4)

Game	Date	Team	Score	High points	High rebounds	High assists	Location Attendance	Record
51	February 2	Miami	W 115–102	James Harden (26)	Terrence Jones (7)	James Harden (14)	Toyota Center; 18,229	26–25
52	February 4	@ Phoenix	W 111–105	Corey Brewer (24)	Dwight Howard (16)	Beverley, Harden (6)	Talking Stick Resort Arena; 15,723	27–25
53	February 6	Portland	L 79–96	James Harden (33)	Dwight Howard (14)	James Harden (8)	Toyota Center; 18,308	27–26
54	February 9	@ Golden State	L 110–123	James Harden (37)	Dwight Howard (15)	Patrick Beverley (7)	Oracle Arena; 19,596	27–27
55	February 10	@ Portland	L 103–116	James Harden (34)	Dwight Howard (13)	James Harden (11)	Moda Center; 19,393	27–28
All-Star Break
56	February 19	@ Phoenix	W 116–100	James Harden (27)	James Harden (10)	James Harden (7)	Talking Stick Resort Arena; 17,102	28–28
57	February 23	@ Utah	L 114–117 (OT)	James Harden (42)	Dwight Howard (16)	Ariza, Beverley, Harden (4)	Vivint Smart Home Arena; 18,132	28–29
58	February 25	@ Portland	W 119–105	James Harden (46)	Dwight Howard (13)	James Harden (8)	Moda Center; 19,393	29–29
59	February 27	San Antonio	L 94–104	James Harden (27)	Dwight Howard (14)	Trevor Ariza (5)	Toyota Center; 18,240	29–30
60	February 29	@ Milwaukee	L 121–128	Dwight Howard (30)	Dwight Howard (13)	Trevor Ariza (11)	BMO Harris Bradley Center; 13,214	29–31

March : 8–8 (home: 4–3; road: 4–5)

Game	Date	Team	Score	High points	High rebounds	High assists	Location Attendance	Record
61	March 2	New Orleans	W 100–95	James Harden (39)	James Harden (12)	James Harden (7)	Toyota Center; 18,226	30–31
62	March 5	@ Chicago	L 100–108	James Harden (36)	Dwight Howard (12)	James Harden (8)	United Center; 22,203	30–32
63	March 6	@ Toronto	W 113–107	James Harden (40)	Dwight Howard (11)	James Harden (14)	Air Canada Centre; 19,800	31–32
64	March 9	@ Philadelphia	W 118–104	James Harden (29)	Dwight Howard (18)	James Harden (8)	Wells Fargo Center; 15,237	32–32
65	March 11	@ Boston	W 102–98	James Harden (32)	Beverley, Howard (12)	Ariza, Beverley, Harden (4)	TD Garden; 18,624	33–32
66	March 12	@ Charlotte	L 109–125	Corey Brewer (21)	Dwight Howard (13)	James Harden (10)	Time Warner Cable Arena; 19,303	33–33
67	March 14	Memphis	W 130–81	Donatas Motiejūnas (18)	Dwight Howard (13)	James Harden (8)	Toyota Center; 18,226	34–33
68	March 16	L.A. Clippers	L 106–122	James Harden (33)	Michael Beasley (8)	James Harden (8)	Toyota Center; 18,304	34–34
69	March 18	Minnesota	W 116–111	James Harden (29)	Dwight Howard (11)	James Harden (11)	Toyota Center; 18,142	35–34
70	March 19	@ Atlanta	L 97–109	Michael Beasley (30)	Dwight Howard (17)	James Harden (8)	Philips Arena; 18,067	35–35
71	March 22	@ Oklahoma City	L 107–111	James Harden (24)	Dwight Howard (13)	James Harden (16)	Chesapeake Energy Arena; 18,203	35–36
72	March 23	Utah	L 87–89	James Harden (26)	Dwight Howard (8)	James Harden (10)	Toyota Center; 18,151	35–37
73	March 25	Toronto	W 112–109	James Harden (32)	James Harden (11)	James Harden (13)	Toyota Center; 18,230	36–37
74	March 27	@ Indiana	L 101–104	James Harden (34)	Dwight Howard (10)	James Harden (8)	Bankers Life Fieldhouse; 17,165	36–38
75	March 29	@ Cleveland	W 106–100	James Harden (27)	Dwight Howard (11)	James Harden (8)	Quicken Loans Arena; 20,562	37–38
76	March 31	Chicago	L 100–103	James Harden (24)	Dwight Howard (13)	James Harden (8)	Toyota Center; 18,244	37–39

April : 4–2 (home: 3–1; road: 1–1)

Game	Date	Team	Score	High points	High rebounds	High assists	Location Attendance	Record
77	April 3	Oklahoma City	W 118–110	James Harden (41)	Dwight Howard (9)	James Harden (9)	Toyota Center; 18,462	38–39
78	April 6	@ Dallas	L 86–88	James Harden (26)	Dwight Howard (16)	Trevor Ariza (5)	American Airlines Center; 20,108	38–40
79	April 7	Phoenix	L 115–124	James Harden (30)	Dwight Howard (7)	Patrick Beverley (9)	Toyota Center; 18,227	38–41
80	April 10	L.A. Lakers	W 130–110	James Harden (40)	Dwight Howard (13)	James Harden (13)	Toyota Center; 18,442	39–41
81	April 11	@ Minnesota	W 129–105	James Harden (34)	Clint Capela (10)	James Harden (6)	Target Center; 14,983	40–41
82	April 13	Sacramento	W 116–81	James Harden (38)	Clint Capela (17)	Patrick Beverley (12)	Toyota Center; 18,311	41–41

2015–16 season schedule

=== Playoffs ===
2016 playoff game log
Total: 1–4 (home: 1–1; road: 0–3)
First Round: 1–4 (home: 1–1; road: 0–3)

Game	Date	Team	Score	High points	High rebounds	High assists	Location Attendance	Series
1	April 16	@ Golden State	L 78–104	James Harden (17)	Clint Capela (12)	Corey Brewer (6)	Oracle Arena; 19,596	0–1
2	April 18	@ Golden State	L 106–115	James Harden (28)	Dwight Howard (10)	James Harden (11)	Oracle Arena; 19,596	0–2
3	April 21	Golden State	W 97–96	James Harden (36)	Dwight Howard (13)	James Harden (9)	Toyota Center; 18,200	1–2
4	April 24	Golden State	L 94–121	Dwight Howard (19)	Dwight Howard (15)	James Harden (10)	Toyota Center; 18,200	1–3
5	April 27	@ Golden State	L 81–114	James Harden (35)	Dwight Howard (21)	James Harden (6)	Oracle Arena; 19,596	1–4

2015–16 season schedule

== Roster ==
2015–16 Houston Rockets roster
Players

Pos.	No.	Player	Height	Weight	DOB	From
F	1	Trevor Ariza	6 ft 8 in (2.03 m)	215 lb (98 kg)	1985–06–30	UCLA
F	8	Michael Beasley	6 ft 9 in (2.06 m)	235 lb (107 kg)	1989–01–09	Kansas State
G	2	Patrick Beverley	6 ft 1 in (1.85 m)	185 lb (84 kg)	1988–07–12	Arkansas
G/F	33	Corey Brewer	6 ft 9 in (2.06 m)	186 lb (84 kg)	1986–03–05	Florida
C	15	Clint Capela	6 ft 10 in (2.08 m)	240 lb (109 kg)	1994–05–18	INSEP (FRA)
F	7	Sam Dekker	6 ft 9 in (2.06 m)	230 lb (104 kg)	1994–05–06	Wisconsin
G	0	Andrew Goudelock	6 ft 3 in (1.91 m)	200 lb (91 kg)	1988–12–07	College of Charleston
G	13	James Harden	6 ft 5 in (1.96 m)	220 lb (100 kg)	1989–08–26	Arizona State
F	35	Montrezl Harrell	6 ft 8 in (2.03 m)	240 lb (109 kg)	1994–01–26	Louisville
C	12	Dwight Howard	6 ft 11 in (2.11 m)	265 lb (120 kg)	1985–12–08	SW Atlanta Academy (GA)
F	6	Terrence Jones	6 ft 9 in (2.06 m)	252 lb (114 kg)	1992–01–09	Kentucky
G	32	K. J. McDaniels	6 ft 6 in (1.98 m)	205 lb (93 kg)	1993–02–09	Clemson
F/C	20	Donatas Motiejūnas	7 ft 0 in (2.13 m)	222 lb (101 kg)	1990–09–20	Lithuania
F	5	Josh Smith	6 ft 9 in (2.06 m)	225 lb (102 kg)	1985–12–05	Oak Hill Academy (VA)
G	31	Jason Terry	6 ft 2 in (1.88 m)	185 lb (84 kg)	1977–09–15	Arizona

Coaches
Head coach
- J. B. Bickerstaff (interim)
Assistant(s)
- Greg Buckner
- T. R. Dunn
- Chris Finch
- Brett Gunning

Legend
- (DP) Unsigned draft pick
- (FA) Free agent
- (S) Suspended
- (DL) On assignment to D-League affiliate
- Injured

Roster
Updated: 2016–04–10

=== Salaries ===
Player	2015–16 salary
Dwight Howard	$22,359,364
James Harden	$15,756,438
Corey Brewer	$8,200,000
Trevor Ariza	$8,193,030
Patrick Beverley	$6,500,000
K. J. McDaniels	$3,333,333
Terrence Jones	$2,489,530
Donatas Motiejūnas	$2,288,205
Sam Dekker	$1,646,400
Jason Terry	$1,499,187
Josh Smith	$1,499,000
Clint Capela	$1,242,720
Montrezl Harrell	$1,000,000
Michael Beasley^{a}	$306,527
Andrew Goudelock^{b}	$200,600
Ty Lawson^{c}	$12,404,495
Marcus Thornton^{d}	$1,186,000
Chuck Hayes^{e}	$83,583
TOTAL	$90,188,412

^aMichael Beasley was signed on March 4, 2016, for the perforated league minimum.
^bAndrew Goudelock was signed on March 9, 2016, for the perforated league minimum.
^cTy Lawson was waived on March 1, 2016, after appearing in 53 games for the Rockets.
^dMarcus Thornton was waived on February 26, 2016, after appearing in 47 games for the Rockets.
^eChuck Hayes was waived on November 8, 2015, after appearing in just two games for the Rockets.

== Player statistics ==
Legend
GP	Games played	GS	Games started	MPG	Minutes per game
FG%	Field-goal percentage	3P%	3-point field-goal percentage	FT%	Free-throw percentage
RPG	Rebounds per game	APG	Assists per game	SPG	Steals per game
BPG	Blocks per game	PPG	Points per game

=== Regular season ===
Houston Rockets statistics
Player	GP	GS	MPG	FG%	3P%	FT%	RPG	APG	SPG	BPG	PPG
Trevor Ariza	81	81	35.3	.416	.371	.783	4.5	2.3	2.0	0.3	12.7
Michael Beasley	20	0	18.2	.522	.333	.776	4.9	0.8	0.6	0.5	12.8
Patrick Beverley	71	63	28.7	.434	.400	.682	3.5	3.4	1.3	0.4	9.9
Corey Brewer	82	12	20.4	.384	.272	.750	2.4	1.3	1.0	0.2	7.2
Clint Capela	77	35	19.1	.582	.000	.379	6.4	0.6	0.8	1.2	7.0
Sam Dekker	3	0	2.0	–	–	–	0.3	0.0	0.3	0.0	0.0
Andrew Goudelock	8	0	6.3	.450	.111	.750	0.3	0.5	0.8	0.3	2.8
James Harden	82	82	38.1	.439	.359	.860	6.1	7.5	1.7	0.6	29.0
Montrezl Harrell	39	1	9.7	.644	.000	.522	1.7	0.4	0.3	0.3	3.6
Chuck Hayes‡	2	0	12.0	.500	–	1.000	4.0	1.0	0.0	0.0	2.0
Dwight Howard	71	71	32.1	.620	.000	.489	11.8	1.4	1.0	1.6	13.7
Terrence Jones	50	11	20.9	.452	.316	.664	4.2	0.8	0.5	0.8	8.7
Ty Lawson‡	53	12	22.2	.387	.330	.700	1.7	3.4	0.8	0.1	5.8
K. J. McDaniels	37	1	6.4	.403	.280	.800	1.1	0.3	0.2	0.2	2.4
Donatas Motiejūnas	37	22	14.8	.439	.281	.642	2.9	1.1	0.5	0.1	6.2
Josh Smith	23	6	18.3	.343	.271	.480	2.9	2.1	0.7	0.6	6.6
Jason Terry	72	7	17.5	.402	.356	.818	1.1	1.4	0.7	0.1	5.9
Marcus Thornton‡	47	6	18.8	.400	.338	.879	2.4	1.4	0.7	0.1	10.0

^{‡}Waived during season

=== Playoffs ===
Houston Rockets statistics
Player	GP	GS	MPG	FG%	3P%	FT%	RPG	APG	SPG	BPG	PPG
Trevor Ariza	5	5	36.2	.255	.143	.750	4.2	0.8	2.6	0.2	6.6
Michael Beasley	5	0	16.0	.478	.333	.857	4.2	0.6	0.2	0.5	10.4
Patrick Beverley	5	5	25.8	.270	.214	1.000	4.4	2.2	0.4	0.4	5.8
Corey Brewer	5	1	15.4	.259	.100	.875	1.4	1.6	0.0	0.2	4.4
Clint Capela	5	0	8.6	.333	–	.400	4.0	0.4	0.6	0.4	1.6
Andrew Goudelock	2	0	5.5	.500	.000	–	1.0	0.0	0.0	0.0	3.0
James Harden	5	5	38.6	.410	.310	.844	5.2	7.6	2.4	0.2	26.6
Montrezl Harrell	2	0	6.0	.333	.000	.500	1.0	0.0	0.0	0.0	1.5
Dwight Howard	5	5	36.0	.542	.000	.368	14.0	1.6	0.8	1.4	13.2
K. J. McDaniels	4	0	8.5	.308	.333	–	1.8	0.3	0.0	0.8	2.3
Donatas Motiejūnas	5	4	19.6	.432	.444	.471	5.2	1.0	0.8	0.4	8.8
Josh Smith	4	0	9.5	.462	.500	.000	0.5	1.0	0.3	0.3	4.0
Jason Terry	5	0	24.8	.342	.316	1.000	2.2	1.2	0.4	0.2	7.0

== Injuries ==
Player	Duration		Injury type	Games missed
Player	Start	End	Injury type	Games missed
Donatas Motiejūnas	Start of season	December 5, 2015	Back surgery	20
Terrence Jones	October 30, 2015	November 11, 2015	Right eye laceration	5
Patrick Beverley	November 4, 2015	November 11, 2015	Concussion	2
Patrick Beverley	November 13, 2015	November 25, 2015	Sprained ankle	5
Sam Dekker	November 16, 2015	February 29, 2016	Back surgery	49
Trevor Ariza	December 8, 2015	December 12, 2015	Bruised lower back	1
Donatas Motiejūnas	January 1, 2016	February 27, 2016	Sore back	25
Patrick Beverley	January 15, 2016	January 24, 2016	Sprained ankle	3
Dwight Howard	January 20, 2016	January 27, 2016	Sprained ankle	3
Terrence Jones	February 3, 2016	February 23, 2016	Concussion	5
Clint Capela	February 24, 2016	March 2, 2016	Sprained right foot	3
Terrence Jones	March 5, 2016	March 16, 2016	Illness	6
Sam Dekker	March 28, 2016	Rest of season	Back injury	8

== Transactions ==
=== Trades ===
July 20, 2015	To Houston Rockets Ty Lawson; Second round draft pick (2017)	To Denver Nuggets Nick Johnson; Joey Dorsey; Kostas Papanikolaou; Pablo Prigioni; 2016 first-round draft pick Cash considerations
January 22, 2016	To Houston Rockets Josh Smith; Rights to Serhiy Lishchuk; Cash considerations	To Los Angeles Clippers Rights to Maarty Leunen

=== Free agents ===
==== Re-signed ====
Player	Signed	Contract	Ref.
Patrick Beverley	July 9, 2015	4 years, $23 million	
Corey Brewer	July 14, 2015	3 years, $23.4 million	
K. J. McDaniels	July 21, 2015	3 years, $10 million	
Jason Terry	August 24, 2015	1 years, $1.5 million	

==== Additions ====
Player	Signed	Contract	Former team	Ref.
Marcus Thornton	July 25, 2015	1 year, $1.1 million	Phoenix Suns	
Chuck Hayes	November 1, 2015	1 year, $1.5 million	Toronto Raptors	
Michael Beasley	March 4, 2016	2 years, $1.7 million	(China) Shandong Golden Stars	
Andrew Goudelock	March 9, 2016	2 years, $1.2 million	(China) Xinjiang Flying Tigers	

==== Subtractions ====
Player	Reason left	Date	New Team	Ref.
Josh Smith	Free Agency	July 16, 2015	Los Angeles Clippers	
Chuck Hayes	Waived	November 8, 2015	None	
Kevin McHale	Fired	November 18, 2015	None	
Marcus Thornton	Waived	February 26, 2016	Washington Wizards	
Ty Lawson	Waived	March 1, 2016	Indiana Pacers	

== Awards, records and milestones ==
=== Awards ===
Player	Award	Date awarded	Ref.
James Harden	Western Conference Player of the Week	November 9, 2015	
James Harden	Western Conference All-Star	January 28, 2016	
James Harden	Western Conference Player of the Month (April)	April 15, 2016	

=== Records ===
- On March 30, Dwight Howard set a franchise record for free throws missed in a game, with 15 in a road victory over the Cleveland Cavaliers.
- James Harden set an NBA single-season record for turnovers with 374. On April 7, he tied the previous record of 366, set by Artis Gilmore of the Chicago Bulls during the 1977–78 season (the first season that individual turnovers were recorded), and in his next game, on April 10, he broke the record.

=== Milestones ===
- On March 18, Howard passed 11,000 career rebounds in a 116–111 victory over the visiting Minnesota Timberwolves.
