= Sean Sweeney (footballer, born 1969) =

Scottish footballer (born 1969)

Personal information
- Date of birth: 17 August 1969 (age 57)
- Place of birth: Glasgow, Scotland
- Position: Central defender

Youth career
- Clydebank Boys Club

Senior career*
Years	Team	Apps	(Gls)
1986–1995	Clydebank	214	(5)
1995–1998	Airdrieonians	79	(1)
1998–2001	Livingston	29	(1)
2001	Airdrieonians	10	(0)
2001–2003	Hamilton Academical	52	(1)
2003–2004	Albion Rovers	21	(1)
Total		405	(9)

International career
1990–1991	Scotland U21	8	(0)
- * Club domestic league appearances and goals

Sean Sweeney (born 17 August 1969) is a Scottish former professional footballer, who played for Clydebank, Airdrieonians, Livingston, Hamilton Academical and Albion Rovers in the Scottish Football League. Sweeney had two spells with Airdrieonians, returning to the club in 2001 when it was in financial trouble.
