= 2015–16 Chicago Bulls season =

NBA professional basketball team season

- Head coach: Fred Hoiberg
- President: Michael Reinsdorf
- General manager: Gar Forman
- Owners: Jerry Reinsdorf
- Arena: United Center

Results
- Record: 42–40 (.512)
- Place: Division: 4th (Central); Conference: 9th (Eastern)
- Playoff finish: Did not qualify
- Stats at Basketball Reference

Local media
- Television: CSN Chicago; WGN; WCIU
- Radio: WMVP

The 2015–16 Chicago Bulls season was the 50th season of the franchise in the National Basketball Association (NBA). Fred Hoiberg was selected as the head coach, after the firing of previous head coach Tom Thibodeau.

Jimmy Butler, for the second time was voted to play in the 2016 NBA All-Star Game, which was held in Toronto. However, Butler was unable to play due to injury and replacing him was teammate Pau Gasol.

Derrick Rose played in 66 games this season, the most since his MVP campaign in 2010–11. Following the season, he was traded to the New York Knicks, Joakim Noah signed as a free agent with the Knicks and Gasol signed with the San Antonio Spurs.

The Bulls missed the playoffs for the first time since 2008 and were eliminated from playoff contention by the Detroit Pistons.

== Draft picks ==
| Round | Pick | Player | Position | Nationality | College/Club Team |
|---|---|---|---|---|---|
| 1 | 22 | Bobby Portis | PF | United States | Arkansas |

== Roster ==
2015–16 Chicago Bulls roster
Players

| Pos. | No. | Player | Height | Weight | DOB | From |
|---|---|---|---|---|---|---|
| F/C | 41 | Cameron Bairstow | 6 ft 9 in (2.06 m) | 250 lb (113 kg) | 1990-12-07 | New Mexico |
| G | 0 | Aaron Brooks | 6 ft 0 in (1.83 m) | 161 lb (73 kg) | 1985-01-14 | Oregon |
| G/F | 21 | Jimmy Butler | 6 ft 7 in (2.01 m) | 220 lb (100 kg) | 1989-09-14 | Marquette |
| F | 34 | Mike Dunleavy Jr. | 6 ft 9 in (2.06 m) | 230 lb (104 kg) | 1980-09-15 | Duke |
| C | 6 | Cristiano Felicio | 6 ft 11 in (2.11 m) | 275 lb (125 kg) | 1992-07-07 | CCSE Prep (CA) |
| F/C | 16 | Pau Gasol | 7 ft 0 in (2.13 m) | 250 lb (113 kg) | 1980-07-06 | Spain |
| F | 22 | Taj Gibson | 6 ft 9 in (2.06 m) | 225 lb (102 kg) | 1985-06-24 | USC |
| G | 7 | Justin Holiday | 6 ft 6 in (1.98 m) | 185 lb (84 kg) | 1989-04-05 | Washington |
| F | 3 | Doug McDermott | 6 ft 8 in (2.03 m) | 225 lb (102 kg) | 1992-01-03 | Creighton |
| F | 44 | Nikola Mirotić | 6 ft 10 in (2.08 m) | 220 lb (100 kg) | 1991-02-11 | Spain |
| G | 55 | E'Twaun Moore | 6 ft 4 in (1.93 m) | 191 lb (87 kg) | 1989-02-25 | Purdue |
| C | 13 | Joakim Noah | 6 ft 11 in (2.11 m) | 232 lb (105 kg) | 1985-02-25 | Florida |
| F | 5 | Bobby Portis | 6 ft 11 in (2.11 m) | 230 lb (104 kg) | 1995-02-10 | Arkansas |
| G | 1 | Derrick Rose | 6 ft 3 in (1.91 m) | 190 lb (86 kg) | 1988-10-04 | Memphis |
| G/F | 20 | Tony Snell | 6 ft 7 in (2.01 m) | 200 lb (91 kg) | 1991-11-10 | New Mexico |

Coaches
Head coach
- Fred Hoiberg
Assistant(s)
- Randy Brown
- Charlie Henry
- Pete Myers
- Mike Wilhelm
- Jim Boylen (Associate HC)
- Jeff Tanaka (trainer)

Legend
- (DP) Unsigned draft pick
- (FA) Free agent
- (S) Suspended
- (DL) On assignment to D-League affiliate
- Injured

Roster
Updated: February 18, 2016

== Standings ==
| Central Division | W | L | PCT | GB | Home | Road | Div | GP |
|---|---|---|---|---|---|---|---|---|
| c – Cleveland Cavaliers | 57 | 25 | .695 | – | 33‍–‍8 | 24‍–‍17 | 8–8 | 82 |
| x – Indiana Pacers | 45 | 37 | .549 | 12.0 | 26‍–‍15 | 19‍–‍22 | 8–8 | 82 |
| x – Detroit Pistons | 44 | 38 | .537 | 13.0 | 26‍–‍15 | 18‍–‍23 | 10–6 | 82 |
| e – Chicago Bulls | 42 | 40 | .512 | 15.0 | 26‍–‍15 | 16‍–‍25 | 10–6 | 82 |
| e – Milwaukee Bucks | 33 | 49 | .402 | 24.0 | 23‍–‍18 | 10‍–‍31 | 4–12 | 82 |

Eastern Conference
| # | Team | W | L | PCT | GB | GP |
|---|---|---|---|---|---|---|
| 1 | c – Cleveland Cavaliers * | 57 | 25 | .695 | – | 82 |
| 2 | y – Toronto Raptors * | 56 | 26 | .683 | 1.0 | 82 |
| 3 | y – Miami Heat * | 48 | 34 | .585 | 9.0 | 82 |
| 4 | x – Atlanta Hawks | 48 | 34 | .585 | 9.0 | 82 |
| 5 | x – Boston Celtics | 48 | 34 | .585 | 9.0 | 82 |
| 6 | x – Charlotte Hornets | 48 | 34 | .585 | 9.0 | 82 |
| 7 | x – Indiana Pacers | 45 | 37 | .549 | 12.0 | 82 |
| 8 | x – Detroit Pistons | 44 | 38 | .537 | 13.0 | 82 |
| 9 | e – Chicago Bulls | 42 | 40 | .512 | 15.0 | 82 |
| 10 | e – Washington Wizards | 41 | 41 | .500 | 16.0 | 82 |
| 11 | e – Orlando Magic | 35 | 47 | .427 | 22.0 | 82 |
| 12 | e – Milwaukee Bucks | 33 | 49 | .402 | 24.0 | 82 |
| 13 | e – New York Knicks | 32 | 50 | .390 | 25.0 | 82 |
| 14 | e – Brooklyn Nets | 21 | 61 | .256 | 36.0 | 82 |
| 15 | e – Philadelphia 76ers | 10 | 72 | .122 | 47.0 | 82 |

== Game log ==
=== Preseason ===
2015 pre-season game log
Total: 4–4 (Home: 3–2; Road: 1–2)
Preseason: 4–4 (home: 3–2; road: 1–2)

| Game | Date | Team | Score | High points | High rebounds | High assists | Location Attendance | Record |
|---|---|---|---|---|---|---|---|---|
| 1 | October 6; 8:00 pm | Milwaukee | 105–95 | Butler, McDermott (23) | Bobby Portis (14) | Jimmy Butler (6) | United Center; 21,199 | 1–0 |
| 2 | October 8; 9:00 pm | @ Denver | 94–111 | Nikola Mirotić (18) | Bobby Portis (17) | Jimmy Butler (4) | Coors Event Center; 5,305 | 1–1 |
| 3 | October 10; 7:00 pm | @ Minnesota | 114–105 | E'Twaun Moore (18) | Mitić, Mirotić (8) | E'Twaun Moore (5) | MTS Centre; 15,294 | 2–1 |
| 4 | October 12; 8:00 pm | New Orleans | 115–123 | Bobby Portis (20) | Bobby Portis (11) | Butler, Mirotić, Moore (3) | United Center; 21,407 | 2–2 |
| 5 | October 14; 8:00 pm | Detroit | 91–114 | E'Twaun Moore (16) | Joakim Noah (9) | E'Twaun Moore (4) | United Center; 21,713 | 2–3 |
| 6 | October 19; 7:00 pm | @ Charlotte | 86–94 | Jimmy Butler (18) | Joakim Noah (13) | Joakim Noah (7) | Time Warner Cable Arena; 8,769 | 2–4 |
| 7 | October 20; 8:00 pm | Indiana | 103–94 | Aaron Brooks (22) | Pau Gasol (8) | Brooks, Butler (6) | United Center; 21,512 | 3–4 |
| 8 | October 23; 8:00 pm | Dallas | 103–102 | Taj Gibson (16) | Joakim Noah (10) | Jimmy Butler (6) | Pinnacle Bank Arena; 15,297 | 4–4 |

2015–16 pre-season schedule

=== Regular season ===
2015–16 game log
Total: 42–40 (Home: 26–15; Road: 16–25)
October: 2–1 (home: 1–0; road: 1–1)

| Game | Date | Team | Score | High points | High rebounds | High assists | Location Attendance | Record |
|---|---|---|---|---|---|---|---|---|
| 1 | October 27 | Cleveland | W 97–95 | Nikola Mirotić (19) | Taj Gibson (10) | Derrick Rose (5) | United Center; 21,957 | 1–0 |
| 2 | October 28 | @ Brooklyn | W 115–100 | Jimmy Butler (24) | Gasol & Mirotić (9) | Jimmy Butler (6) | Barclays Center; 17,732 | 2–0 |
| 3 | October 30 | @ Detroit | L 94–98 (OT) | Jimmy Butler (23) | Pau Gasol (12) | Derrick Rose (6) | Palace of Auburn Hills; 16,035 | 2–1 |

November : 8–4 (home: 5–1; road: 3–3)

| Game | Date | Team | Score | High points | High rebounds | High assists | Location Attendance | Record |
|---|---|---|---|---|---|---|---|---|
| 4 | November 1 | Orlando | W 92–87 | Gasol & Mirotić (16) | Joakim Noah (9) | Derrick Rose (8) | United Center; 21,585 | 3–1 |
| 5 | November 3 | @ Charlotte | L 105–130 | Jimmy Butler (26) | Pau Gasol (8) | Derrick Rose (5) | Time Warner Cable Arena; 15,136 | 3–2 |
| 6 | November 5 | Oklahoma City | W 104–98 | Derrick Rose (29) | Pau Gasol (10) | Derrick Rose (7) | United Center; 21,861 | 4–2 |
| 7 | November 7 | Minnesota | L 93–102 (OT) | Pau Gasol (21) | Pau Gasol (14) | Joakim Noah (7) | United Center; 21,988 | 4–3 |
| 8 | November 9 | @ Philadelphia | W 111–88 | Nikola Mirotić (20) | Nikola Mirotić (10) | Derrick Rose (8) | Wells Fargo Center; 13,879 | 5–3 |
| 9 | November 13 | Charlotte | W 102–97 | Jimmy Butler (27) | Joakim Noah (18) | Derrick Rose (8) | United Center; 21,749 | 6–3 |
| 10 | November 16 | Indiana | W 96–95 | Derrick Rose (23) | Pau Gasol (13) | Derrick Rose (7) | United Center; 21,660 | 7–3 |
| 11 | November 18 | @ Phoenix | W 103–97 | Jimmy Butler (32) | Joakim Noah (11) | Kirk Hinrich (6) | Talking Stick Resort Arena; 17,377 | 8–3 |
| 12 | November 20 | @ Golden State | L 94–106 | Jimmy Butler (28) | Mirotic, Gasol (10) | Jimmy Butler (7) | Oracle Arena; 19,596 | 8–4 |
| 13 | November 24 | @ Portland | W 93–88 | Jimmy Butler (22) | Pau Gasol (14) | Derrick Rose (6) | Moda Center; 19,393 | 9–4 |
| 14 | November 27 | @ Indiana | L 92–104 | Nikola Mirotic (25) | Pau Gasol (11) | Butler, Rose (5) | Bankers Life Fieldhouse; 18,165 | 9–5 |
| 15 | November 30 | San Antonio | W 92–89 | Pau Gasol (18) | Pau Gasol (13) | Joakim Noah (7) | United Center; 21,909 | 10–5 |

December : 8–7 (home: 7–4; road: 1–3)

| Game | Date | Team | Score | High points | High rebounds | High assists | Location Attendance | Record |
|---|---|---|---|---|---|---|---|---|
| 16 | December 2 | Denver | W 99–90 | Pau Gasol (24) | Pau Gasol (16) | Derrick Rose (9) | United Center; 21,349 | 11–5 |
| 17 | December 5 | Charlotte | L 96–102 | Jimmy Butler (25) | Pau Gasol (11) | Joakim Noah (6) | United Center; 21,770 | 11–6 |
| 18 | December 7 | Phoenix | L 101–103 | Pau Gasol (22) | Pau Gasol (10) | Gasol, Noah (6) | United Center; 21,337 | 11–7 |
| 19 | December 9 | @ Boston | L 100–105 | Jimmy Butler (36) | Pau Gasol (15) | Derrick Rose (6) | TD Garden; 17,318 | 11–8 |
| 20 | December 10 | L. A. Clippers | W 83–80 | Pau Gasol (24) | Joakim Noah (13) | Jimmy Butler (8) | United Center; 21,491 | 12–8 |
| 21 | December 12 | New Orleans | W 98–94 | Pau Gasol (18) | Pau Gasol (11) | Brooks, Rose (3) | United Center; 21,605 | 13–8 |
| 22 | December 14 | Philadelphia | W 115–96 | Jimmy Butler (23) | Joakim Noah (15) | Joakim Noah (8) | United Center; 21,166 | 14–8 |
| 23 | December 16 | Memphis | W 98–85 | Jimmy Butler (24) | Pau Gasol (14) | Noah, Rose (5) | United Center; 21,032 | 15–8 |
| 24 | December 18 | Detroit | L 144–147 (4OT) | Jimmy Butler (43) | Pau Gasol (15) | Derrick Rose (8) | United Center; 21,534 | 15–9 |
| 25 | December 19 | @ New York | L 91–107 | Joakim Noah (21) | Bobby Portis (11) | Jimmy Butler (5) | Madison Square Garden; 19,812 | 15–10 |
| 26 | December 21 | Brooklyn | L 102–105 | Jimmy Butler (24) | Gasol, Gibson (9) | Joakim Noah (8) | United Center; 21,825 | 15–11 |
| 27 | December 25 | @ Oklahoma City | W 105–96 | Jimmy Butler (23) | Pau Gasol (13) | Pau Gasol (6) | Chesapeake Energy Arena; 18,203 | 16–11 |
| 28 | December 26 | @ Dallas | L 111–118 | Nikola Mirotic (23) | Pau Gasol (9) | Jimmy Butler (8) | American Airlines Center; 20,392 | 16–12 |
| 29 | December 28 | Toronto | W 104–97 | Gasol, Snell (22) | Taj Gibson (11) | Butler, Brooks (5) | United Center; 21,898 | 17–12 |
| 30 | December 30 | Indiana | W 102–100 (OT) | Aaron Brooks (22) | Taj Gibson (14) | Aaron Brooks (5) | United Center; 22,206 | 18–12 |

January : 8–8 (home: 3–4; road: 5–4)

| Game | Date | Team | Score | High points | High rebounds | High assists | Location Attendance | Record |
|---|---|---|---|---|---|---|---|---|
| 31 | January 1 | New York | W 108–81 | Jimmy Butler (23) | Bobby Portis (10) | Nikola Mirotic (7) | United Center; 22,443 | 19–12 |
| 32 | January 3 | @ Toronto | W 115–113 | Jimmy Butler (42) | Pau Gasol (13) | Pau Gasol (6) | Air Canada Centre; 19,800 | 20–12 |
| 33 | January 5 | Milwaukee | W 117–106 | Jimmy Butler (32) | Taj Gibson (14) | Jimmy Butler (10) | United Center; 21,686 | 21–12 |
| 34 | January 7 | Boston | W 101–92 | Jimmy Butler (19) | Pau Gasol (18) | Jimmy Butler (10) | United Center; 21,497 | 22–12 |
| 35 | January 9 | @ Atlanta | L 105–120 | Jimmy Butler (27) | Nikola Mirotic (10) | Gasol, Rose (5) | Philips Arena; 19,010 | 22–13 |
| 36 | January 11 | Washington | L 100–114 | Derrick Rose (23) | Pau Gasol (10) | Jimmy Butler (7) | United Center; 21,409 | 22–14 |
| 37 | January 12 | @ Milwaukee | L 101–106 | Jimmy Butler (30) | Pau Gasol (14) | Jimmy Butler (6) | BMO Harris Bradley Center; 16,867 | 22–15 |
| 38 | January 14 | @ Philadelphia | W 115–111 (OT) | Jimmy Butler (53) | Joakim Noah (16) | Joakim Noah (8) | Wells Fargo Center; 14,063 | 23–15 |
| 39 | January 15 | Dallas | L 77–83 | Derrick Rose (18) | Taj Gibson (11) | Jimmy Butler (6) | United Center; 22,056 | 23–16 |
| 40 | January 18 | @ Detroit | W 111–101 | Pau Gasol (31) | Pau Gasol (12) | Aaron Brooks (10) | Palace of Auburn Hills; 18,935 | 24–16 |
| 41 | January 20 | Golden State | L 94–125 | Derrick Rose (29) | Gasol, Portis (8) | Brooks, Butler, McDermott, Mirotic, Moore, Rose, Snell (2) | United Center; 23,152 | 24–17 |
| 42 | January 22 | @ Boston | L 101–110 | Jimmy Butler (28) | Jimmy Butler (14) | Butler, Gasol, Rose (3) | TD Garden; 18,624 | 24–18 |
| 43 | January 23 | @ Cleveland | W 96–83 | Pau Gasol (25) | Pau Gasol (10) | Pau Gasol (6) | Quicken Loans Arena; 20,562 | 25–18 |
| 44 | January 25 | Miami | L 84–89 | Pau Gasol (19) | Pau Gasol (17) | Aaron Brooks (6) | United Center; 21,720 | 25–19 |
| 45 | January 28 | @ L. A. Lakers | W 114–91 | Jimmy Butler (26) | Pau Gasol (12) | Jimmy Butler (10) | Staples Center; 18,997 | 26–19 |
| 46 | January 31 | @ L. A. Clippers | L 93–120 | Jimmy Butler (23) | Pau Gasol (14) | Gasol, Moore (5) | Staples Center; 19,325 | 26–20 |

February : 4–8 (home: 3–2; road: 1–6)

| Game | Date | Team | Score | High points | High rebounds | High assists | Location Attendance | Record |
|---|---|---|---|---|---|---|---|---|
| 47 | February 1 | @ Utah | L 96–105 (OT) | Jimmy Butler (26) | Taj Gibson (11) | Jimmy Butler (6) | Vivint Smart Home Arena; 18,811 | 26–21 |
| 48 | February 3 | @ Sacramento | W 107–102 | E'Twaun Moore (24) | Pau Gasol (13) | Derrick Rose (9) | Sleep Train Arena; 17,317 | 27–21 |
| 49 | February 5 | @ Denver | L 110–115 | Derrick Rose (30) | Derrick Rose (9) | Derrick Rose (8) | Pepsi Center; 19,155 | 27–22 |
| 50 | February 6 | @ Minnesota | L 105–112 | Pau Gasol (25) | Pau Gasol (8) | Derrick Rose (10) | Target Center; 17,876 | 27–23 |
| 51 | February 8 | @ Charlotte | L 91–108 | Pau Gasol (22) | Pau Gasol (10) | Pau Gasol (7) | Time Warner Cable Arena; 15,886 | 27–24 |
| 52 | February 10 | Atlanta | L 90–113 | Pau Gasol (20) | Gasol, Portis (10) | Gasol, Moore (5) | United Center; 21,709 | 27–25 |
All-Star Break
| 53 | February 18 | @ Cleveland | L 95–106 | Derrick Rose (28) | Bobby Portis (10) | Pau Gasol (4) | Quicken Loans Arena; 20,562 | 27–26 |
| 54 | February 19 | Toronto | W 116–106 | Doug McDermott (30) | Pau Gasol (11) | Pau Gasol (9) | United Center; 21,849 | 28–26 |
| 55 | February 21 | L. A. Lakers | W 126–115 | Moore, Rose (24) | Taj Gibson (8) | Derrick Rose (6) | United Center; 23,143 | 29–26 |
| 56 | February 24 | Washington | W 109–104 | Moore, Gibson (17) | Pau Gasol (15) | Pau Gasol (9) | United Center; 21,560 | 30–26 |
| 57 | February 26 | @ Atlanta | L 88–103 | Doug McDermott (20) | Pau Gasol (17) | Aaron Brooks (5) | Philips Arena; 18,123 | 30–27 |
| 58 | February 27 | Portland | L 95–103 | Pau Gasol (22) | Pau Gasol (16) | Pau Gasol (14) | United Center; 21,962 | 30–28 |

March : 8–9 (home: 5–3; road: 3–6)

| Game | Date | Team | Score | High points | High rebounds | High assists | Location Attendance | Record |
|---|---|---|---|---|---|---|---|---|
| 59 | March 1 | @ Miami | L 111–129 | Derrick Rose (17) | Pau Gasol (9) | Pau Gasol (6) | American Airlines Arena; 19,654 | 30–29 |
| 60 | March 2 | @ Orlando | L 89–102 | Derrick Rose (16) | Dunleavy Jr., Portis (6) | Derrick Rose (6) | Amway Center; 16,072 | 30–30 |
| 61 | March 5 | Houston | W 108–100 | Pau Gasol (28) | Pau Gasol (17) | Derrick Rose (9) | United Center; 22,203 | 31–30 |
| 62 | March 7 | Milwaukee | W 100–90 | Derrick Rose (22) | Pau Gasol (17) | Pau Gasol (13) | United Center; 21,672 | 32–30 |
| 63 | March 10 | @ San Antonio | L 101–109 | Gasol, Rose (21) | Pau Gasol (12) | Derrick Rose (6) | AT&T Center; 18,418 | 32–31 |
| 64 | March 11 | Miami | L 96–118 | Pau Gasol (17) | Pau Gasol (12) | Derrick Rose (9) | United Center; 22,067 | 32–32 |
| 65 | March 14 | @ Toronto | W 109–107 | Doug McDermott (29) | Taj Gibson (10) | Jimmy Butler (6) | Air Canada Centre; 19,800 | 33–32 |
| 66 | March 16 | @ Washington | L 96–117 | Doug McDermott (20) | Butler, Felicio, Holiday (6) | Derrick Rose (4) | Verizon Center; 19,556 | 33–33 |
| 67 | March 17 | Brooklyn | W 118–102 | Jimmy Butler (22) | Bobby Portis (14) | Jimmy Butler (7) | United Center; 21,513 | 34–33 |
| 68 | March 19 | Utah | W 92–85 | Derrick Rose (22) | Taj Gibson (10) | Jimmy Butler (6) | United Center; 21,856 | 35–33 |
| 69 | March 21 | Sacramento | W 109–102 | Gibson, Rose (18) | Pau Gasol (14) | Jimmy Butler (8) | United Center; 21,531 | 36–33 |
| 70 | March 23 | New York | L 107–115 | Nikola Mirotic (35) | Nikola Mirotic (6) | Jimmy Butler (8) | United Center; 21,788 | 36–34 |
| 71 | March 24 | @ New York | L 94–106 | Derrick Rose (30) | Gibson, Mirotic (6) | Butler, Mirotic, Rose (3) | Madison Square Garden; 19,812 | 36–35 |
| 72 | March 26 | @ Orlando | L 89–111 | Taj Gibson (16) | Bobby Portis (7) | Pau Gasol (8) | Amway Center; 18,846 | 36–36 |
| 73 | March 28 | Atlanta | L 100–102 | Derrick Rose (20) | Taj Gibson (12) | Gasol, Rose (5) | United Center; 21,761 | 36–37 |
| 74 | March 29 | @ Indiana | W 98–96 | Nikola Mirotic (28) | Pau Gasol (12) | Pau Gasol (7) | Bankers Life Fieldhouse; 17,050 | 37–37 |
| 75 | March 31 | @ Houston | W 103–100 | Nikola Mirotic (28) | Pau Gasol (10) | Jimmy Butler (6) | Toyota Center; 18,244 | 38–37 |

April : 4–3 (home: 2–1; road: 2–2)

| Game | Date | Team | Score | High points | High rebounds | High assists | Location Attendance | Record |
|---|---|---|---|---|---|---|---|---|
| 76 | April 2 | Detroit | L 90–94 | Jimmy Butler (28) | Jimmy Butler (17) | Jimmy Butler (12) | United Center; 22,197 | 38–38 |
| 77 | April 3 | @ Milwaukee | W 102–98 | Jimmy Butler (25) | Pau Gasol (8) | Pau Gasol (8) | BMO Harris Bradley Center; 15,768 | 39–38 |
| 78 | April 5 | @ Memphis | L 92–108 | Nikola Mirotic (20) | Pau Gasol (10) | Derrick Rose (8) | FedEx Forum; 17,591 | 39–39 |
| 79 | April 7 | @ Miami | L 98–106 | Jimmy Butler (25) | Pau Gasol (12) | Jimmy Butler (6) | American Airlines Arena; 19,771 | 39–40 |
| 80 | April 9 | Cleveland | W 105–102 | Jimmy Butler (21) | Pau Gasol (12) | Jimmy Butler (6) | United Center; 22,186 | 40–40 |
| 81 | April 11 | @ New Orleans | W 121–116 | Jimmy Butler (23) | Bobby Portis (8) | Jimmy Butler (11) | Smoothie King Center; 16,867 | 41–40 |
| 82 | April 13 | Philadelphia | W 115–105 | Nikola Mirotic (32) | Bobby Portis (14) | Jimmy Butler (10) | United Center; 21,777 | 42–40 |

2015–16 season schedule

== Player statistics ==
Legend
| GP | Games played | GS | Games started | MPG | Minutes per game |
| FG% | Field-goal percentage | 3P% | 3-point field-goal percentage | FT% | Free-throw percentage |
| RPG | Rebounds per game | APG | Assists per game | SPG | Steals per game |
| BPG | Blocks per game | PPG | Points per game |

=== Regular season ===
| Player | GP | GS | MPG | FG% | 3P% | FT% | RPG | APG | SPG | BPG | PPG |
|---|---|---|---|---|---|---|---|---|---|---|---|
| Doug McDermott | 81 | 4 | 23.0 | .452 | .425 | .857 | 2.4 | .7 | .2 | .1 | 9.4 |
| Taj Gibson | 73 | 55 | 26.5 | .526 | .000 | .692 | 6.9 | 1.5 | .6 | 1.1 | 8.6 |
| Pau Gasol | 72 | 72 | 31.8 | .469 | .348 | .792 | 11.0 | 4.1 | .6 | 2.0 | 16.5 |
| Aaron Brooks | 69 | 0 | 16.1 | .401 | .357 | .766 | 1.5 | 2.6 | .4 | .1 | 7.1 |
| Jimmy Butler | 67 | 67 | 36.9 | .454 | .312 | .832 | 5.3 | 4.8 | 1.6 | .6 | 20.9 |
| Derrick Rose | 66 | 66 | 31.8 | .427 | .293 | .793 | 3.4 | 4.7 | .7 | .2 | 16.4 |
| Nikola Mirotić | 66 | 38 | 24.9 | .407 | .390 | .807 | 5.5 | 1.5 | .9 | .7 | 11.8 |
| Tony Snell | 64 | 33 | 20.3 | .372 | .361 | .909 | 3.1 | 1.0 | .3 | .3 | 5.3 |
| Bobby Portis | 62 | 4 | 17.8 | .427 | .308 | .727 | 5.4 | .8 | .4 | .4 | 7.0 |
| E'Twaun Moore | 59 | 22 | 21.4 | .481 | .452 | .629 | 2.3 | 1.7 | .6 | .3 | 7.5 |
| Kirk Hinrich^{†} | 35 | 7 | 15.9 | .398 | .411 | .938 | 1.7 | 1.7 | .4 | .0 | 3.8 |
| Mike Dunleavy Jr. | 31 | 30 | 22.7 | .410 | .394 | .784 | 2.7 | 1.3 | .5 | .3 | 7.2 |
| Cristiano Felício | 31 | 4 | 10.4 | .556 | .000 | .714 | 3.3 | .8 | .2 | .4 | 3.4 |
| Joakim Noah | 29 | 2 | 21.9 | .383 | .000 | .489 | 8.8 | 3.8 | .6 | 1.0 | 4.3 |
| Justin Holiday^{†} | 27 | 4 | 18.9 | .413 | .433 | .815 | 2.3 | 1.7 | .7 | .6 | 6.5 |
| Cameron Bairstow | 18 | 2 | 5.7 | .325 | .200 | .875 | 1.6 | .3 | .1 | .2 | 1.9 |

- ^{†} Denotes player spent time with another team in the season. Stats reflect time with the Bulls only.
