= 2015–16 Boston Celtics season =

Season of National Basketball Association team the Boston Celtics

- Head coach: Brad Stevens
- General manager: Danny Ainge
- Owners: Boston Basketball Partners
- Arena: TD Garden

Results
- Record: 48–34 (.585)
- Place: Division: 2nd (Atlantic); Conference: 5th (Eastern)
- Playoff finish: First Round (lost to Hawks 2–4)
- Stats at Basketball Reference

Local media
- Television: Comcast SportsNet New England
- Radio: WBZ-FM

The 2015–16 Boston Celtics season was the 70th season of the franchise in the National Basketball Association (NBA). The Celtics finished the year at 48–34, their best record since their 2011–12 season and their first winning season since 2013.

For the first time in his career, Isaiah Thomas was voted to play in the 2016 NBA All-Star Game. For the second straight season under Brad Stevens, the Celtics qualified for the playoffs, this time as the number 5 seed. However, the Celtics once again did not make it out of the first round as they were stopped by the Atlanta Hawks in six games.

== Draft picks ==
Round	Pick	Player	Position	Nationality	College/School
1	16	Terry Rozier	PG	United States	Louisville
1	28	R. J. Hunter	SG	United States	Georgia State
2	33	Jordan Mickey	PF	United States	LSU
2	45	Marcus Thornton	PG	United States	William & Mary

== Game log ==
=== Preseason game log ===
2015–16 game log
Total: 6–1 (home: 3–0; road: 3–1)
Pre-season: 6–1 (home: 3–0; road: 3–1)

Game	Date	Team	Score	High points	High rebounds	High assists	Location Attendance	Record
1	October 6	@ Milano	124–91	Isaiah Thomas (18)	David Lee (7)	Marcus Smart (6)	Mediolanum Forum; 11,388	1–0
2	October 8	@ Real Madrid	111–96	Avery Bradley (17)	David Lee (11)	Jae Crowder (6)	Barclaycard Center; 12,414	2–0
3	October 14	@ Brooklyn	109–105	Amir Johnson (19)	Amir Johnson (6)	Isaiah Thomas (9)	Barclays Center; 10,482	3–0
4	October 16	@ New York	95–101	Isaiah Thomas (13)	Jared Sullinger (10)	Isaiah Thomas (5)	Madison Square Garden; 19,421	3–1
5	October 19	Brooklyn	111–105	Terry Rozier (16)	Jerebko, Turner (7)	Rozier, Turner (6)	TD Garden; 15,540	4–1
6	October 22	New York	99–85	Jared Sullinger (16)	Lee, Sullinger (8)	Marcus Smart (9)	TD Garden; 16,101	5–1
7	October 23	Philadelphia	81–65	Mickey, Smart (10)	Jared Sullinger (14)	Isaiah Thomas (6)	Verizon Wireless Arena; 8,403	6–1

2015–16 season schedule

== Standing ==
Atlantic Division	W	L	PCT	GB	Home	Road	Div	GP
y – Toronto Raptors	56	26	.683	–	32‍–‍9	24‍–‍17	14–2	82
x – Boston Celtics	48	34	.585	8.0	28‍–‍13	20‍–‍21	10–6	82
e – New York Knicks	32	50	.390	24.0	18‍–‍23	14‍–‍27	8–8	82
e – Brooklyn Nets	21	61	.256	35.0	14‍–‍27	7‍–‍34	6–10	82
e – Philadelphia 76ers	10	72	.122	46.0	7‍–‍34	3‍–‍38	2–14	82

Eastern Conference
#	Team	W	L	PCT	GB	GP
1	c – Cleveland Cavaliers *	57	25	.695	–	82
2	y – Toronto Raptors *	56	26	.683	1.0	82
3	y – Miami Heat *	48	34	.585	9.0	82
4	x – Atlanta Hawks	48	34	.585	9.0	82
5	x – Boston Celtics	48	34	.585	9.0	82
6	x – Charlotte Hornets	48	34	.585	9.0	82
7	x – Indiana Pacers	45	37	.549	12.0	82
8	x – Detroit Pistons	44	38	.537	13.0	82
9	e – Chicago Bulls	42	40	.512	15.0	82
10	e – Washington Wizards	41	41	.500	16.0	82
11	e – Orlando Magic	35	47	.427	22.0	82
12	e – Milwaukee Bucks	33	49	.402	24.0	82
13	e – New York Knicks	32	50	.390	25.0	82
14	e – Brooklyn Nets	21	61	.256	36.0	82
15	e – Philadelphia 76ers	10	72	.122	47.0	82

== Regular season game log ==
2015–16 game log
Total: 48–34 (home: 28–13; road: 20–21)
October: 1–1 (home: 1–1; road: 0–0)

Game	Date	Team	Score	High points	High rebounds	High assists	Location Attendance	Record
1	October 28	Philadelphia	W 112–95	Isaiah Thomas (27)	Johnson, Sullinger (7)	Isaiah Thomas (7)	TD Garden; 18,624	1–0
2	October 30	Toronto	L 103–113	Isaiah Thomas (25)	Amir Johnson (8)	Isaiah Thomas (7)	TD Garden; 16,898	1–1

November : 9–7 (home: 5–3; road: 4–4)

Game	Date	Team	Score	High points	High rebounds	High assists	Location Attendance	Record
3	November 1	San Antonio	L 87–95	Avery Bradley (18)	Lee, Sullinger (8)	Isaiah Thomas (5)	TD Garden; 17,461	1–2
4	November 4	@ Indiana	L 98–100	Isaiah Thomas (27)	Jared Sullinger (11)	Isaiah Thomas (7)	Bankers Life Fieldhouse; 14,022	1–3
5	November 6	Washington	W 118–98	Jared Sullinger (21)	Jae Crowder (10)	Isaiah Thomas (8)	TD Garden; 18,624	2–3
6	November 10	@ Milwaukee	W 99–83	Isaiah Thomas (20)	Jared Sullinger (10)	Evan Turner (6)	BMO Harris Bradley Center; 18,624	3–3
7	November 11	Indiana	L 91–102	Evan Turner (20)	Jared Sullinger (11)	Isaiah Thomas (4)	TD Garden; 17,879	3–4
8	November 13	Atlanta	W 106–93	Isaiah Thomas (23)	Jared Sullinger (10)	Isaiah Thomas (10)	TD Garden; 17,138	4–4
9	November 15	@ Oklahoma City	W 100–85	Marcus Smart (26)	Jared Sullinger (15)	Isaiah Thomas (8)	Chesapeake Energy Arena; 18,203	5–4
10	November 16	@ Houston	W 111–95	Isaiah Thomas (23)	Marcus Smart (9)	Isaiah Thomas (6)	Toyota Center; 17,005	6–4
11	November 18	Dallas	L 102–106	Isaiah Thomas (19)	Jared Sullinger (12)	Isaiah Thomas (6)	TD Garden; 17,262	6–5
12	November 20	Brooklyn	W 120–95	Avery Bradley (21)	Kelly Olynyk (10)	Isaiah Thomas (9)	TD Garden; 18,361	7–5
13	November 22	@ Brooklyn	L 101–111	Bradley, Thomas (27)	Jared Sullinger (10)	Isaiah Thomas (6)	Barclays Center; 14,866	7–6
14	November 24	@ Atlanta	L 97–121	Avery Bradley (25)	Amir Johnson (7)	Evan Turner (7)	Philips Arena; 18,968	7–7
15	November 25	Philadelphia	W 84–80	Isaiah Thomas (30)	Jared Sullinger (15)	Isaiah Thomas (6)	TD Garden; 17,588	8–7
16	November 27	Washington	W 111–78	Isaiah Thomas (21)	Jared Sullinger (15)	David Lee (4)	TD Garden; 18,624	9–7
17	November 29	@ Orlando	L 91–110	Isaiah Thomas (20)	Jared Sullinger (11)	Isaiah Thomas (7)	Amway Center; 16,209	9–8
18	November 30	@ Miami	W 105–95	Avery Bradley (25)	Amir Johnson (10)	Isaiah Thomas (9)	American Airlines Arena; 19,600	10–8

December : 8–6 (home: 3–4; road: 5–2)

Game	Date	Team	Score	High points	High rebounds	High assists	Location Attendance	Record
19	December 3	@ Sacramento	W 114–97	Olynyk, Thomas (21)	Amir Johnson (7)	Isaiah Thomas (9)	Mexico City Arena (Mexico City, MX/NBA Global Games); 18,660	11–8
20	December 5	@ San Antonio	L 105–108	Isaiah Thomas (23)	Amir Johnson (11)	Isaiah Thomas (8)	AT&T Center; 18,418	11–9
21	December 7	@ New Orleans	W 111–93	Isaiah Thomas (22)	Jared Sullinger (20)	Isaiah Thomas (5)	Smoothie King Center; 15,715	12–9
22	December 9	Chicago	W 105–100	Isaiah Thomas (23)	Jared Sullinger (16)	Evan Turner (7)	TD Garden; 17,318	13–9
23	December 11	Golden State	L 119–124 (2OT)	Kelly Olynyk (28)	Jared Sullinger (13)	Isaiah Thomas (10)	TD Garden; 18,624	13–10
24	December 12	@ Charlotte	W 98–93	Avery Bradley (23)	Crowder, Sullinger (7)	Isaiah Thomas (13)	Time Warner Cable Arena; 18,490	14–10
25	December 15	Cleveland	L 77–89	Avery Bradley (17)	Evan Turner (8)	Thomas, Turner (4)	TD Garden; 18,624	14–11
26	December 16	@ Detroit	L 116–119	Isaiah Thomas (38)	Jared Sullinger (10)	Isaiah Thomas (7)	The Palace of Auburn Hills; 13,120	14–12
27	December 18	Atlanta	L 101–109	Isaiah Thomas (29)	Jae Crowder (10)	Isaiah Thomas (6)	TD Garden; 18,624	14–13
28	December 21	Minnesota	W 113–99	Kelly Olynyk (19)	Jae Crowder (10)	Isaiah Thomas (12)	TD Garden; 18,624	15–13
29	December 23	@ Charlotte	W 102–89	Kelly Olynyk (20)	Jae Crowder (12)	Isaiah Thomas (7)	Time Warner Cable Arena; 19,082	16–13
30	December 26	@ Detroit	W 99–93	Avery Bradley (18)	Johnson, Sullinger (8)	Isaiah Thomas (9)	The Palace of Auburn Hills; 18,288	17–13
31	December 27	New York	W 100–91	Isaiah Thomas (21)	Kelly Olynyk (9)	Isaiah Thomas (6)	TD Garden; 18,624	18–13
32	December 30	L.A. Lakers	L 104–112	Isaiah Thomas (24)	Jared Sullinger (8)	Isaiah Thomas (7)	TD Garden; 18,624	18–14

January : 9–8 (home: 5–2; road: 4–6)

Game	Date	Team	Score	High points	High rebounds	High assists	Location Attendance	Record
33	January 2	Brooklyn	L 97–100	Isaiah Thomas (24)	Amir Johnson (11)	Isaiah Thomas (7)	TD Garden; 18,624	18–15
34	January 4	@ Brooklyn	W 103–94	Jae Crowder (25)	Evan Turner (11)	Isaiah Thomas (7)	Barclays Center; 15,448	19–15
35	January 6	Detroit	L 94–99	Isaiah Thomas (22)	Amir Johnson (11)	Isaiah Thomas (10)	TD Garden; 18,624	19–16
36	January 7	@ Chicago	L 92–101	Jae Crowder (17)	Jared Sullinger (11)	Evan Turner (6)	United Center; 21,497	19–17
37	January 10	@ Memphis	L 98–101	Isaiah Thomas (35)	Amir Johnson (9)	Isaiah Thomas (8)	FedEx Forum; 17,112	19–18
38	January 12	@ New York	L 114–120	Isaiah Thomas (34)	Jae Crowder (8)	Isaiah Thomas (8)	Madison Square Garden; 19,812	19–19
39	January 13	Indiana	W 103–94	Isaiah Thomas (28)	Amir Johnson (18)	Bradley, Johnson (6)	TD Garden; 18,624	20–19
40	January 15	Phoenix	W 117–103	Kelly Olynyk (21)	Marcus Smart (11)	Marcus Smart (11)	TD Garden; 18,624	21–19
41	January 16	@ Washington	W 119–117	Isaiah Thomas (32)	Jared Sullinger (9)	Jae Crowder (6)	Verizon Center; 20,356	22–19
42	January 18	@ Dallas	L 113–118 (OT)	Smart, Thomas (20)	Jared Sullinger (11)	Isaiah Thomas (7)	AmericanAirlines Center; 19,866	22–20
43	January 20	@ Toronto	L 109–115	Isaiah Thomas (21)	Crowder, Turner (5)	Isaiah Thomas (10)	Air Canada Centre; 19,800	22–21
44	January 22	Chicago	W 110–101	Isaiah Thomas (22)	Jared Sullinger (12)	Sullinger, Thomas, Turner (5)	TD Garden; 18,624	23–21
45	January 24	@ Philadelphia	W 112–92	Crowder, Thomas (20)	Amir Johnson (12)	Jared Sullinger (7)	Wells Fargo Center; 9,722	24–21
46	January 25	@ Washington	W 116–91	Isaiah Thomas (23)	Smart, Sullinger (6)	Isaiah Thomas (9)	Verizon Center; 11,753	25–21
47	January 27	Denver	W 111–103	Avery Bradley (27)	Amir Johnson (13)	Johnson, Turner (6)	TD Garden; 18,108	26–21
48	January 29	Orlando	W 113–94	Olynyk, Smart (16)	Jared Sullinger (11)	Thomas, Turner (8)	TD Garden; 17,729	27–21
49	January 31	@ Orlando	L 114–119	Marcus Smart (26)	Amir Johnson (11)	Evan Turner (5)	Amway Center; 18,846	27–22

February : 9–3 (home: 6–0; road: 3–3)

Game	Date	Team	Score	High points	High rebounds	High assists	Location Attendance	Record
50	February 2	@ New York	W 97–89	Isaiah Thomas (20)	Turner, Zeller (10)	Isaiah Thomas (8)	Madison Square Garden; 19,812	28–22
51	February 3	Detroit	W 102–95	Isaiah Thomas (17)	Kelly Olynyk (7)	Isaiah Thomas (7)	TD Garden; 17,297	29–22
52	February 5	@ Cleveland	W 104–103	Isaiah Thomas (22)	Evan Turner (12)	Evan Turner (6)	Quicken Loans Arena; 20,562	30–22
53	February 7	Sacramento	W 128–119	Avery Bradley (25)	Amir Johnson (9)	Thomas, Turner (9)	TD Garden; 18,624	31–22
54	February 9	@ Milwaukee	L 111–112	Bradley, Crowder (18)	Jared Sullinger (11)	Evan Turner (10)	BMO Harris Bradley Center; 13,215	31–23
55	February 10	L.A. Clippers	W 139–134 (OT)	Isaiah Thomas (36)	Jared Sullinger (11)	Isaiah Thomas (11)	TD Garden; 18,186	32–23
All-Star Break
56	February 19	@ Utah	L 93–111	Isaiah Thomas (25)	Jared Sullinger (11)	Isaiah Thomas (6)	Vivint Smart Home Arena; 19,911	32–24
57	February 21	@ Denver	W 121–101	Isaiah Thomas (22)	Jared Sullinger (11)	Isaiah Thomas (12)	Pepsi Center; 16,065	33–24
58	February 22	@ Minnesota	L 122–124	Jae Crowder (27)	Jae Crowder (9)	Isaiah Thomas (9)	Target Center; 11,639	33–25
59	February 25	Milwaukee	W 112–107	Isaiah Thomas (27)	Jared Sullinger (10)	Isaiah Thomas (7)	TD Garden; 18,157	34–25
60	February 27	Miami	W 101–89	Marcus Smart (15)	Jared Sullinger (12)	Evan Turner (9)	TD Garden; 18,624	35–25
61	February 29	Utah	W 100–95	Jae Crowder (22)	Johnson, Sullinger (9)	Isaiah Thomas (9)	TD Garden; 17,680	36–25

March : 7–7 (home: 5–2; road: 2–5)

Game	Date	Team	Score	High points	High rebounds	High assists	Location Attendance	Record
62	March 2	Portland	W 116–93	Isaiah Thomas (30)	Smart, Sullinger (11)	Evan Turner (5)	TD Garden; 18,624	37–25
63	March 4	New York	W 105–104	Isaiah Thomas (32)	Jared Sullinger (11)	Isaiah Thomas (8)	TD Garden; 18,624	38–25
64	March 5	@ Cleveland	L 103–120	Isaiah Thomas (27)	Jared Sullinger (13)	Avery Bradley (5)	Quicken Loans Arena; 20,562	38–26
65	March 9	Memphis	W 116–96	Isaiah Thomas (22)	Tyler Zeller (7)	Evan Turner (8)	TD Garden; 17,790	39–26
66	March 11	Houston	L 98–102	Isaiah Thomas (30)	Jared Sullinger (12)	Evan Turner (9)	TD Garden; 18,624	39–27
67	March 15	@ Indiana	L 98–103	Isaiah Thomas (21)	Jared Sullinger (11)	Isaiah Thomas (8)	Bankers Life Fieldhouse; 17,118	39–28
68	March 16	Oklahoma City	L 109–130	Isaiah Thomas (29)	Amir Johnson (12)	Amir Johnson (5)	TD Garden; 18,624	39–29
69	March 18	@ Toronto	L 91–105	Isaiah Thomas (20)	Amir Johnson (6)	Terry Rozier (5)	Air Canada Centre; 19,800	39–30
70	March 20	@ Philadelphia	W 120–105	Isaiah Thomas (26)	Jared Sullinger (13)	Isaiah Thomas (8)	Wells Fargo Center; 15,103	40–30
71	March 21	Orlando	W 107–96	Isaiah Thomas (28)	Amir Johnson (11)	Isaiah Thomas (7)	TD Garden; 18,624	41–30
72	March 23	Toronto	W 91–79	Isaiah Thomas (23)	Amir Johnson (13)	Evan Turner (7)	TD Garden; 18,624	42–30
73	March 26	@ Phoenix	W 102–99	Isaiah Thomas (28)	Evan Turner (11)	Marcus Smart (4)	Talking Stick Resort Arena; 18,055	43–30
74	March 28	@ L.A. Clippers	L 90–114	Isaiah Thomas (24)	Jared Sullinger (11)	Marcus Smart (4)	Staples Center; 19,258	43–31
75	March 31	@ Portland	L 109–116	Isaiah Thomas (24)	Crowder, Sullinger (10)	Jared Sullinger (5)	Moda Center; 19,393	43–32

April : 5–2 (home: 3–1; road: 2–1)

Game	Date	Team	Score	High points	High rebounds	High assists	Location Attendance	Record
76	April 1	@ Golden State	W 109–106	Isaiah Thomas (22)	Jared Sullinger (12)	Isaiah Thomas (6)	Oracle Arena; 19,596	44–32
77	April 3	@ L.A. Lakers	W 107–100	Isaiah Thomas (26)	Amir Johnson (13)	Isaiah Thomas (6)	Staples Center; 18,997	45–32
78	April 6	New Orleans	W 104–97	Isaiah Thomas (32)	Amir Johnson (7)	Isaiah Thomas (8)	TD Garden; 18,624	46–32
79	April 8	Milwaukee	W 124–109	Tyler Zeller (26)	Jonas Jerebko (7)	Evan Turner (9)	TD Garden; 18,624	47–32
80	April 9	@ Atlanta	L 107–118	Marcus Smart (19)	Amir Johnson (8)	Isaiah Thomas (6)	Philips Arena; 19,257	47–33
81	April 11	Charlotte	L 100–114	Bradley, Thomas (17)	Kelly Olynyk (11)	Jared Sullinger (5)	TD Garden; 18,624	47–34
82	April 13	Miami	W 98–88	Isaiah Thomas (32)	Amir Johnson (7)	Isaiah Thomas (6)	TD Garden; 18,624	48–34

2015–16 season schedule

== Roster ==
2015–16 Boston Celtics roster
Players

Pos.	No.	Player	Height	Weight	DOB	From
PG	0	Avery Bradley (injured)	6 ft 2 in (1.88 m)	180 lb (82 kg)	1990–11–26	Texas
SF	99	Jae Crowder	6 ft 6 in (1.98 m)	235 lb (107 kg)	1990–07–06	Marquette
SG	30	John Holland	6 ft 5 in (1.96 m)	205 lb (93 kg)	1988–11–06	Boston University
SG	28	R. J. Hunter	6 ft 5 in (1.96 m)	185 lb (84 kg)	1993–10–24	Georgia State
PF	8	Jonas Jerebko	6 ft 10 in (2.08 m)	231 lb (105 kg)	1987–03–02	Sweden
PF	90	Amir Johnson	6 ft 9 in (2.06 m)	240 lb (109 kg)	1987–05–01	Westchester HS (CA)
PF	55	Jordan Mickey	6 ft 8 in (2.03 m)	235 lb (107 kg)	1994–07–09	LSU
C	41	Kelly Olynyk	7 ft 0 in (2.13 m)	238 lb (108 kg)	1991–04–19	Gonzaga
PG	12	Terry Rozier	6 ft 2 in (1.88 m)	190 lb (86 kg)	1994–03–17	Louisville
PG	36	Marcus Smart	6 ft 4 in (1.93 m)	227 lb (103 kg)	1994–03–06	Oklahoma State
PF	7	Jared Sullinger	6 ft 9 in (2.06 m)	260 lb (118 kg)	1992–03–04	Ohio State
PG	4	Isaiah Thomas	5 ft 9 in (1.75 m)	185 lb (84 kg)	1989–02–07	Washington
SF	11	Evan Turner	6 ft 7 in (2.01 m)	220 lb (100 kg)	1988–10–27	Ohio State
SG	13	James Young	6 ft 6 in (1.98 m)	215 lb (98 kg)	1995–08–16	Kentucky
C	44	Tyler Zeller	7 ft 0 in (2.13 m)	253 lb (115 kg)	1990–01–17	North Carolina

Coaches
Head coach
- Brad Stevens
Assistant(s)
- Jerome Allen
- Jay Larranaga
- Walter McCarty
- Micah Shrewsberry
- Jamie Young

Legend
- (DP) Unsigned draft pick
- (FA) Free agent
- (S) Suspended
- (DL) On assignment to D-League affiliate
- Injured

Roster
Updated: 2016–04–11

== Playoffs ==
=== Game log ===
2016 playoff game log
Total: 2–4 (home: 2–1; road: 0–3)
First Round: 2–4 (home: 2–1; road: 0–3)

Game	Date	Team	Score	High points	High rebounds	High assists	Location Attendance	Series
1	April 16	@ Atlanta	L 101–102	Isaiah Thomas (27)	Jae Crowder (10)	Isaiah Thomas (8)	Philips Arena; 18,980	0–1
2	April 19	@ Atlanta	L 72–89	Isaiah Thomas (16)	Amir Johnson (8)	Crowder, Smart, Turner (3)	Philips Arena; 18,972	0–2
3	April 22	Atlanta	W 111–103	Isaiah Thomas (42)	Jonas Jerebko (12)	Evan Turner (7)	TD Garden; 18,624	1–2
4	April 24	Atlanta	W 104–95 (OT)	Isaiah Thomas (28)	Jonas Jerebko (10)	Thomas, Turner (6)	TD Garden; 18,624	2–2
5	April 26	@ Atlanta	L 83–110	Evan Turner (15)	Jonas Jerebko (8)	Terry Rozier (4)	Philips Arena; 18,987	2–3
6	April 28	Atlanta	L 92–104	Isaiah Thomas (25)	Smart, Turner (7)	Isaiah Thomas (10)	TD Garden; 18,624	2–4

2016 playoff schedule

== Player statistics ==
Legend
GP	Games played	GS	Games started	MPG	Minutes per game
FG%	Field-goal percentage	3P%	3-point field-goal percentage	FT%	Free-throw percentage
RPG	Rebounds per game	APG	Assists per game	SPG	Steals per game
BPG	Blocks per game	PPG	Points per game

=== Regular season ===
Boston Celtics statistics
Player	GP	GS	MPG	FG%	3P%	FT%	RPG	APG	SPG	BPG	PPG
Isaiah Thomas	82	79	32.2	.428	.359	.871	3.0	6.2	1.1	.1	22.2
Jared Sullinger	81	73	23.6	.435	.282	.640	8.3	2.3	.9	.6	10.3
Evan Turner	81	12	28.0	.456	.241	.827	4.9	4.4	1.0	.3	10.5
Amir Johnson	79	76	22.8	.585	.233	.570	6.4	1.7	.7	1.1	7.3
Jonas Jerebko	78	0	15.1	.413	.398	.782	3.7	.8	.3	.3	4.4
Avery Bradley	76	72	33.4	.447	.361	.780	2.9	2.1	1.5	.3	15.2
Jae Crowder	73	73	31.6	.443	.336	.820	5.1	1.8	1.7	.5	14.2
Kelly Olynyk	69	8	20.2	.455	.405	.750	4.1	1.5	.8	.5	10.0
Marcus Smart	61	10	27.3	.348	.253	.777	4.2	3.0	1.5	.3	9.1
Tyler Zeller	60	3	11.8	.476		.815	3.0	.5	.2	.4	6.1
Terry Rozier	39	0	8.0	.274	.222	.800	1.6	.9	.2	.0	1.8
R. J. Hunter	36	0	8.8	.367	.302	.857	1.0	.4	.4	.1	2.7
David Lee^{†}	30	4	15.7	.453	.000	.784	4.3	1.8	.4	.4	7.1
James Young	29	0	6.9	.306	.231	.250	.9	.3	.2	.0	1.0
Jordan Mickey	16	0	3.6	.364		.500	.8	.1	.0	.7	1.3
Coty Clarke	3	0	2.0	.500	1.000		.3	.0	.0	.0	2.0

=== Playoffs ===
Boston Celtics statistics
Player	GP	GS	MPG	FG%	3P%	FT%	RPG	APG	SPG	BPG	PPG
Isaiah Thomas	6	6	36.7	.395	.283	.809	3.0	5.0	.7	.8	24.2
Jae Crowder	6	6	32.8	.278	.244	.636	6.5	2.2	1.5	.5	9.5
Amir Johnson	6	6	22.3	.667	.000	.778	7.2	.7	.2	1.3	8.5
Evan Turner	6	4	35.7	.365	.214	.778	5.7	4.5	1.3	1.0	13.2
Jonas Jerebko	6	4	27.0	.478	.318	.800	6.8	1.7	.3	.7	9.2
Jared Sullinger	6	2	13.5	.310	.500	.750	4.5	1.2	.2	.0	5.2
Marcus Smart	6	1	32.2	.367	.344	.810	4.5	3.0	1.7	.8	12.0
Terry Rozier	5	0	19.8	.391	.364	1.000	3.4	1.2	.2	.6	4.8
R. J. Hunter	5	0	8.2	.222	.200		1.2	.6	.0	.2	1.0
Kelly Olynyk	4	0	8.0	.111	.000		1.0	.8	.3	.0	.5
Tyler Zeller	3	0	12.7	.467		.667	5.0	.7	.0	.7	6.0
James Young	3	0	3.3	.333	.000		.0	.0	.0	.0	.7
Jordan Mickey	2	0	5.0	.500			1.0	1.0	.0	.5	2.0
Avery Bradley	1	1	33.0	.438	.143	1.000	3.0	1.0	1.0	1.0	18.0
John Holland	1	0	1.0	.000	.000		.0	.0	.0	.0	.0

- ^{†} Denotes player spent time with another team in the season. Stats reflect time with the Celtics only.

== Transactions ==
=== Trades ===
July 14, 2015	To Boston Celtics Perry Jones	To Oklahoma City Thunder 2018 Second Round Draft Pick
July 27, 2015	To Boston Celtics Zoran Dragić Future Second Round Draft Pick	To Miami Heat Conditional Future Second Round Draft Pick
July 27, 2015	To Boston Celtics David Lee	To Golden State Warriors Gerald Wallace Chris Babb

=== Re-signed ===
Player	Signed	Former team
Jonas Jerebko	Signed 2-year contract worth $10 million	Boston Celtics
Jae Crowder	Signed 5-year contract worth $35 million	Boston Celtics

=== Additions ===
Player	Signed	Former team
Amir Johnson	Signed 2-year contract worth $24 million	Toronto Raptors

=== Subtractions ===
Player	Reason	New team
Phil Pressey	Waived	Phoenix Suns
Zoran Dragić	Waived	Khimki
David Lee	Waived	Dallas Mavericks
