= 2015–16 Utah Jazz season =

NBA professional basketball team season

- Head coach: Quin Snyder
- General manager: Dennis Lindsey
- Arena: Vivint Arena

Results
- Record: 40–42 (.488)
- Place: Division: 3rd (Northwest); Conference: 9th (Western)
- Playoff finish: Did not qualify
- Stats at Basketball Reference

Local media
- Television: Root Sports Rocky Mountain
- Radio: 1280; 97.5 The Zone

The 2015–16 Utah Jazz season was the 42nd season of the franchise in the National Basketball Association (NBA), and the 37th season of the franchise in Salt Lake City. Utah missed the playoffs for the fourth year in a row thanks to a win and a tiebreaker win by the Houston Rockets, but remained in playoff contention until before the final regular season game in which would be Kobe Bryant's last NBA game.

== Draft picks ==
Round	Pick	Player	Position	Nationality	College
1	12	Trey Lyles	SF / PF	United States	Kentucky
2	42	Olivier Hanlan	PG	Canada	Boston College
2	54	Dani Diez	SF	Spain	Gipuzkoa Basket

== Roster ==
2015–16 Utah Jazz roster
Players

Pos.	No.	Player	Height	Weight	DOB	From
PF	33	Trevor Booker	6 ft 8 in (2.03 m)	228 lb (103 kg)	1987–11–25	Clemson
PG	3	Trey Burke	6 ft 1 in (1.85 m)	191 lb (87 kg)	1992–11–12	Michigan
SG	10	Alec Burks	6 ft 6 in (1.98 m)	214 lb (97 kg)	1991–07–20	Colorado
SG	11	Dante Exum	6 ft 6 in (1.98 m)	190 lb (86 kg)	1995–07–13	Lake Ginninderra (AUS)
PF	15	Derrick Favors	6 ft 10 in (2.08 m)	265 lb (120 kg)	1991–07–15	Georgia Tech
C	27	Rudy Gobert	7 ft 1 in (2.16 m)	245 lb (111 kg)	1992–06–26	France
SF	20	Gordon Hayward	6 ft 8 in (2.03 m)	226 lb (103 kg)	1990–03–23	Butler
SG	5	Rodney Hood	6 ft 8 in (2.03 m)	206 lb (93 kg)	1992–10–20	Duke
SF	2	Joe Ingles	6 ft 8 in (2.03 m)	226 lb (103 kg)	1987–10–02	Lake Ginninderra (AUS)
SG	23	Chris Johnson	6 ft 6 in (1.98 m)	206 lb (93 kg)	1990–04–29	Dayton
PF	41	Trey Lyles	6 ft 10 in (2.08 m)	234 lb (106 kg)	1995–11–05	Kentucky
PG	8	Shelvin Mack	6 ft 3 in (1.91 m)	203 lb (92 kg)	1990–04–22	Butler
PG	25	Raul Neto	6 ft 2 in (1.88 m)	179 lb (81 kg)	1992–05–19	Brazil
C	21	Tibor Pleiß	7 ft 3 in (2.21 m)	256 lb (116 kg)	1989–11–02	Germany
C	24	Jeff Withey	7 ft 0 in (2.13 m)	231 lb (105 kg)	1990–03–07	Kansas

Coaches
Head coach
- Quin Snyder
Assistant(s)
- Johnnie Bryant
- Alex Jensen
- Brad Jones
- Igor Kokoškov
- Antonio Lang
- Mike Wells
- Mark McKown (player development)
- Jeff Watkinson (player development)

Legend
- (DP) Unsigned draft pick
- (FA) Free agent
- (S) Suspended
- (DL) On assignment to D-League affiliate
- Injured

Roster
Updated: 2016–04–03

Northwest Division	W	L	PCT	GB	Home	Road	Div	GP
y – Oklahoma City Thunder	55	27	.671	–	32‍–‍9	23‍–‍18	13–3	82
x – Portland Trail Blazers	44	38	.537	11.0	28‍–‍13	16‍–‍25	11–5	82
e – Utah Jazz	40	42	.488	15.0	24‍–‍17	16‍–‍25	8–8	82
e – Denver Nuggets	33	49	.402	22.0	18‍–‍23	15‍–‍26	4–12	82
e – Minnesota Timberwolves	29	53	.354	26.0	14‍–‍27	15‍–‍26	4–12	82

=== Conference ===
Western Conference
#	Team	W	L	PCT	GB	GP
1	z – Golden State Warriors *	73	9	.890	–	82
2	y – San Antonio Spurs *	67	15	.817	6.0	82
3	y – Oklahoma City Thunder *	55	27	.671	18.0	82
4	x – Los Angeles Clippers	53	29	.646	20.0	82
5	x – Portland Trail Blazers	44	38	.537	29.0	82
6	x – Dallas Mavericks	42	40	.512	31.0	82
7	x – Memphis Grizzlies	42	40	.512	31.0	82
8	x – Houston Rockets	41	41	.500	32.0	82
9	e – Utah Jazz	40	42	.488	33.0	82
10	e – Sacramento Kings	33	49	.402	40.0	82
11	e – Denver Nuggets	33	49	.402	40.0	82
12	e – New Orleans Pelicans	30	52	.366	43.0	82
13	e – Minnesota Timberwolves	29	53	.354	44.0	82
14	e – Phoenix Suns	23	59	.280	50.0	82
15	e – Los Angeles Lakers	17	65	.207	56.0	82

== Preseason ==
2015 pre-season game log
Total: 3–4 (Home: 1–2; Road: 2–2)
Pre-season: 3–4 (home: 1–2; road: 2–2)

Game	Date	Team	Score	High points	High rebounds	High assists	Location Attendance	Record
1	October 4	@ L.A. Lakers	90–71	Derrick Favors (16)	Favors, Hayward (9)	Raul Neto (6)	Stan Sheriff Center; 10,300	1–0
2	October 6	@ L.A. Lakers	117–114 OT	Alec Burks (27)	Trey Lyles (8)	Alec Burks (6)	Stan Sheriff Center; 10,300	2–0
3	October 9	@ Phoenix	85–101	Gordon Hayward (24)	Favors, Booker (7)	Gordon Hayward (3)	Talking Stick Resort Arena; 10,773	2–1
4	October 12	@ Portland	81–88	Alec Burks (19)	Derrick Favors (10)	Alec Burks (3)	Moda Center; 15,171	2–2
5	October 18	Portland	111–116 OT	Trey Burke (22)	Jeff Withey (11)	Burke, Booker, Lyles, Neto (3)	EnergySolutions Arena; 16,352	2–3
6	October 20	Oklahoma City	102–113	Rodney Hood (23)	Trevor Booker (6)	Trey Burke (4)	EnergySolutions Arena; 17,806	2–4
7	October 22	Denver	98–78	Trey Burke (17)	Rudy Gobert (11)	Alec Burks (5)	EnergySolutions Arena; 17,083	3–4

2014–15 season schedule

== Regular season game log ==
2015–16 game log
Total: 40–42 (Home: 24–17; Road: 16–25)
October: 2–1 (home: 0–0; road: 2–1)

Game	Date	Team	Score	High points	High rebounds	High assists	Location Attendance	Record
1	October 28	@ Detroit	L 87–92	Derrick Favors (26)	Rudy Gobert (12)	Rodney Hood (6)	Palace of Auburn Hills; 18,434	0–1
2	October 30	@ Philadelphia	W 99–71	Derrick Favors (20)	Derrick Favors (12)	Trey Burke (6)	Wells Fargo Center; 17,122	1–1
3	October 31	@ Indiana	W 97–76	Derrick Favors (18)	Rudy Gobert (17)	Hayward, Burke (3)	Bankers Life Fieldhouse; 14,412	2–1

November : 6–7 (home: 3–3; road: 3–4)

Game	Date	Team	Score	High points	High rebounds	High assists	Location Attendance	Record
4	November 4	Portland	L 92–108	Alec Burks (21)	Derrick Favors (10)	Rodney Hood (4)	Vivint Smart Home Arena; 19,911	2–2
5	November 5	@ Denver	W 96–84	Gordon Hayward (20)	Rudy Gobert (16)	Alec Burks (8)	Pepsi Center; 9,906	3–2
6	November 7	Memphis	W 89–79	Trey Burke (24)	Derrick Favors (16)	Burks, Hayward (4)	Vivint Smart Home Arena; 19,456	4–2
7	November 10	@ Cleveland	L 114–118	Alec Burks (24)	Derrick Favors (9)	Gobert, Neto (5)	Quicken Loans Arena; 20,562	4–3
8	November 12	@ Miami	L 91–92	Derrick Favors (25)	Derrick Favors (12)	Hayward, Hood (3)	American Airlines Arena; 19,600	4–4
9	November 13	@ Orlando	L 93–102	Burke, Hayward (16)	Booker, Favors, Withey (7)	Raul Neto (7)	Amway Center; 16,709	4–5
10	November 15	@ Atlanta	W 97–96	Derrick Favors (23)	Rudy Gobert (11)	Trey Burke (5)	Philips Arena; 14,436	5–5
11	November 18	Toronto	W 93–89	Derrick Favors (18)	Derrick Favors (11)	Rodney Hood (4)	Vivint Smart Home Arena; 18,741	6–5
12	November 20	@ Dallas	L 93–102	Gordon Hayward (22)	Rudy Gobert (13)	Hayward, Hood (4)	AmericanAirlines Arena; 20,028	6–6
13	November 23	Oklahoma City	L 89–111	Gordon Hayward (19)	Derrick Favors (7)	Gordon Hayward (4)	Vivint Smart Home Arena; 19,911	6–7
14	November 25	@ L.A. Clippers	W 102–91	Gordon Hayward (33)	Rudy Gobert (11)	Raul Neto (6)	Staples Center; 19,060	7–7
15	November 28	New Orleans	W 101–87	Alec Burks (21)	Trevor Booker (15)	Burks, Hood (4)	Vivint Smart Home Arena; 19,911	8–7
16	November 30	Golden State	L 103–106	Derrick Favors (23)	Rudy Gobert (11)	Gordon Hayward (4)	Vivint Smart Home Arena; 19,911	8–8

December : 6–9 (home: 6–4; road: 0–5)

Game	Date	Team	Score	High points	High rebounds	High assists	Location Attendance	Record
17	December 3	Orlando	L 94–103	Gordon Hayward (24)	Derrick Favors (10)	Trey Burke (6)	Vivint Smart Home Arena; 19,247	8–9
18	December 5	Indiana	W 122–119 (OT)	Derrick Favors (35)	Trevor Booker (14)	Trey Burke (7)	Vivint Smart Home Arena; 19,500	9–9
19	December 8	@ Sacramento	L 106–114	Burks, Hayward (18)	Booker, Favors (10)	Gordon Hayward (6)	Sleep Train Arena; 16,505	9–10
20	December 9	New York	W 106–85	Gordon Hayward (24)	Trey Lyles (10)	Hayward, Neto, Burke (5)	Vivint Smart Home Arena; 18,586	10–10
21	December 11	Oklahoma City	L 90–94	Gordon Hayward (19)	Gordon Hayward (8)	Alec Burks (5)	Vivint Smart Home Arena; 19,911	10–11
22	December 13	@ Oklahoma City	L 98–104 (OT)	Rodney Hood (23)	Derrick Favors (10)	Elijah Millsap (4)	Chesapeake Energy Arena; 18,203	10–12
23	December 14	@ San Antonio	L 81–118	Derrick Favors (16)	Trevor Booker (7)	Joe Ingles (4)	AT&T Center; 18,418	10–13
24	December 16	New Orleans	L 94–104	Derrick Favors (22)	Derrick Favors (7)	Burke, Favors (5)	Vivint Smart Home Arena; 17,899	10–14
25	December 18	Denver	W 97–88	Gordon Hayward (26)	Derrick Favors (9)	Rodney Hood (5)	Vivint Smart Home Arena; 19,169	11–14
26	December 21	Phoenix	W 110–89	Gordon Hayward (24)	Derrick Favors (9)	Gordon Hayward (4)	Vivint Smart Home Arena; 19,911	12–14
27	December 23	@ Golden State	L 85–103	Derrick Favors (17)	Derrick Favors (9)	Burke, Hood, Ingles (3)	Oracle Arena; 19,596	12–15
28	December 26	L.A. Clippers	L 104–109	Gordon Hayward (28)	Jeff Withey (7)	Gordon Hayward (5)	Vivint Smart Home Arena; 19,911	12–16
29	December 28	Philadelphia	W 95–91	Gordon Hayward (24)	Jeff Withey (12)	Gordon Hayward (4)	Vivint Smart Home Arena; 19,911	13–16
30	December 30	@ Minnesota	L 80–94	Trey Burke (23)	Trevor Booker (15)	Trey Burke (4)	Target Center; 14,326	13–17
31	December 31	Portland	W 109–96	Gordon Hayward (23)	Gordon Hayward (10)	Rodney Hood (6)	Vivint Smart Home Arena; 19,380	14–17

January : 7–8 (home: 5–3; road: 2–5)

Game	Date	Team	Score	High points	High rebounds	High assists	Location Attendance	Record
32	January 2	Memphis	W 92–87 (OT)	Rodney Hood (32)	Trevor Booker (11)	Gordon Hayward (4)	Vivint Smart Home Arena; 18,455	15–17
33	January 4	Houston	L 91–93	Rodney Hood (23)	Jeff Withey (11)	Rodney Hood (7)	Vivint Smart Home Arena; 17,912	15–18
34	January 6	@ San Antonio	L 98–123	Trey Burke (21)	Booker, Withey (7)	Burke, Hayward (4)	AT&T Center; 18,418	15–19
35	January 7	@ Houston	L 94–103	Gordon Hayward (15)	Trey Lyles (9)	Raul Neto (7)	Toyota Center; 18,155	15–20
36	January 9	Miami	W 98–83	Gordon Hayward (34)	Trey Lyles (10)	Raul Neto (5)	Vivint Smart Home Arena; 19,911	16–20
37	January 10	@ L. A. Lakers	W 86–74	Gordon Hayward (25)	Trey Lyles (9)	Rodney Hood (4)	Staples Center; 18,997	17–20
38	January 13	@ Portland	L 85–99	Gordon Hayward (19)	Rudy Gobert (8)	Gordon Hayward (9)	Moda Center; 19,393	17–21
39	January 14	Sacramento	L 101–103	Hayward, Lyles (19)	Rudy Gobert (12)	Raul Neto (4)	Vivint Smart Home Arena; 17,894	17–22
40	January 16	L. A. Lakers	W 109–82	Rudy Gobert (18)	Rudy Gobert (18)	Gordon Hayward (5)	Vivint Smart Home Arena; 19,911	18–22
41	January 18	@ Charlotte	L 119–124 (OT)	Gordon Hayward (36)	Rudy Gobert (14)	Gordon Hayward (9)	Time Warner Cable Arena; 17,459	18–23
42	January 20	@ New York	L 111–118 (OT)	Rodney Hood (29)	Booker, Gobert (8)	Hayward, Hood (5)	Madison Square Garden; 19,812	18–24
43	January 22	@ Brooklyn	W 108–86	Gordon Hayward (21)	Rudy Gobert (9)	Gordon Hayward (9)	Barclays Center; 12,809	19–24
44	January 25	Detroit	L 92–95	Rodney Hood (23)	Rudy Gobert (17)	Rodney Hood (6)	Vivint Smart Home Arena; 18,783	19–25
45	January 27	Charlotte	W 102–73	Rodney Hood (24)	Rudy Gobert (12)	Gordon Hayward (5)	Vivint Smart Home Arena; 16,683	20–25
46	January 29	Minnesota	W 103–90	Rodney Hood (22)	Rudy Gobert (12)	Raul Neto (6)	Vivint Smart Home Arena; 18,850	21–25

February : 7–6 (home: 5–2; road: 2–4)

Game	Date	Team	Score	High points	High rebounds	High assists	Location Attendance	Record
47	February 1	Chicago	W 105–96 (OT)	Gordon Hayward (27)	Gobert, Hayward (12)	Gordon Hayward (7)	Vivint Smart Home Arena; 18,811	22–25
48	February 3	Denver	W 85–81	Favors, Hayward (16)	Derrick Favors (11)	Gordon Hayward (5)	Vivint Smart Home Arena; 19,461	23–25
49	February 5	Milwaukee	W 84–81	Rodney Hood (23)	Derrick Favors (15)	Raul Neto (4)	Vivint Smart Home Arena; 19,911	24–25
50	February 6	@ Phoenix	W 98–89	Rodney Hood (25)	Rudy Gobert (13)	Raul Neto (4)	Talking Stick Resort Arena; 16,180	25–25
51	February 9	@ Dallas	W 121–119 (OT)	Rodney Hood (29)	Rudy Gobert (10)	Rodney Hood (5)	AmericanAirlines Arena; 19,394	26–25
52	February 10	@ New Orleans	L 96–100	Derrick Favors (29)	Rudy Gobert (14)	Gordon Hayward (4)	Smoothie King Center; 15,256	26–26
All-Star Break
53	February 18	@ Washington	L 89–103	Gordon Hayward (19)	Rudy Gobert (12)	Trey Burke (7)	Verizon Center; 12,415	26–27
54	February 19	Boston	W 111–93	Derrick Favors (23)	Rudy Gobert (15)	Derrick Favors (6)	Vivint Smart Home Arena; 19,911	27–27
55	February 21	@ Portland	L 111–115	Derrick Favors (22)	Favors, Gobert (8)	Shelvin Mack (6)	Moda Center; 19,470	27–28
56	February 23	Houston	W 117–114 (OT)	Gordon Hayward (28)	Derrick Favors (12)	Hayward, Hood (5)	Vivint Smart Home Arena; 18,132	28–28
57	February 25	San Antonio	L 78–96	Derrick Favors (25)	Favors, Gobert (6)	Rodney Hood (6)	Vivint Smart Home Arena; 19,911	28–29
58	February 27	Brooklyn	L 96–98	Gordon Hayward (27)	Rudy Gobert (19)	Gordon Hayward (6)	Vivint Smart Home Arena; 18,863	28–30
59	February 29	@ Boston	L 95–100	Lyles, Mack (18)	Derrick Favors (16)	Shelvin Mack (5)	TD Garden; 17,680	28–31

March : 9–7 (home: 4–2; road: 5–5)

Game	Date	Team	Score	High points	High rebounds	High assists	Location Attendance	Record
60	March 2	@ Toronto	L 94–104	Gordon Hayward (26)	Rudy Gobert (8)	Gordon Hayward (6)	Air Canada Centre; 19,800	28–32
61	March 4	@ Memphis	L 88–94	Gordon Hayward (18)	Rudy Gobert (18)	Shelvin Mack (8)	FedExForum; 17,188	28–33
62	March 5	@ New Orleans	W 106–94	Derrick Favors (28)	Rudy Gobert (18)	Hayward, Ingles, Mack (4)	Smoothie King Center; 16,680	29–33
63	March 8	Atlanta	L 84–91	Gordon Hayward (22)	Rudy Gobert (15)	Shelvin Mack (4)	Vivint Smart Home Arena; 19,282	29–34
64	March 9	@ Golden State	L 94–115	Trey Burke (18)	Rudy Gobert (15)	Shelvin Mack (8)	Oracle Arena; 19,596	29–35
65	March 11	Washington	W 114–93	Shelvin Mack (27)	Rudy Gobert (11)	Shelvin Mack (4)	Vivint Smart Home Arena; 19,911	30–35
66	March 13	@ Sacramento	W 108–99	Derrick Favors (28)	Derrick Favors (14)	Shelvin Mack (8)	Sleep Train Arena; 17,023	31–35
67	March 14	Cleveland	W 94–85	Rodney Hood (28)	Rudy Gobert (11)	Shelvin Mack (10)	Vivint Smart Home Arena; 19,911	32–35
68	March 17	Phoenix	W 103–69	Trey Lyles (17)	Rudy Gobert (16)	Shelvin Mack (10)	Vivint Smart Home Arena; 18,784	33–35
69	March 19	@ Chicago	L 85–92	Derrick Favors (24)	Rudy Gobert (7)	Shelvin Mack (8)	United Center; 21,856	33–36
70	March 20	@ Milwaukee	W 94–85	Gordon Hayward (18)	Rudy Gobert (14)	Shelvin Mack (12)	BMO Harris Bradley Center; 14,124	34–36
71	March 23	@ Houston	W 89–87	Gordon Hayward (22)	Derrick Favors (15)	Gordon Hayward (5)	Toyota Center; 18,151	35–36
72	March 24	@ Oklahoma City	L 91–113	Trey Burke (17)	Joe Ingles (7)	Gordon Hayward (5)	Chesapeake Energy Arena; 18,203	35–37
73	March 26	@ Minnesota	W 93–84	Derrick Favors (19)	Rudy Gobert (11)	Shelvin Mack (6)	Target Center; 14,694	36–37
74	March 28	L. A. Lakers	W 123–75	Rodney Hood (30)	Rudy Gobert (19)	Gordon Hayward (6)	Vivint Smart Home Arena; 19,911	37–37
75	March 30	Golden State	L 96–103 (OT)	Gordon Hayward (21)	Rudy Gobert (18)	Shelvin Mack (9)	Vivint Smart Home Arena; 19,911	37–38

April : 3–4 (home: 1–3; road: 2–1)

Game	Date	Team	Score	High points	High rebounds	High assists	Location Attendance	Record
76	April 1	Minnesota	W 98–85	Gordon Hayward (22)	Rudy Gobert (14)	Shelvin Mack (5)	Vivint Smart Home Arena; 19,911	38–38
77	April 3	@ Phoenix	W 101–86	Gordon Hayward (22)	Shelvin Mack (7)	Rodney Hood (7)	Talking Stick Resort Arena; 17,279	39–38
78	April 5	San Antonio	L 86–88	Rodney Hood (23)	Rudy Gobert (10)	Rodney Hood (4)	Vivint Smart Home Arena; 19,381	39–39
79	April 8	L. A. Clippers	L 99–102 (OT)	Gordon Hayward (24)	Gordon Hayward (13)	Gordon Hayward (5)	Vivint Smart Home Arena; 19,911	39–40
80	April 10	@ Denver	W 100–84	Hayward, Lyles (22)	Rudy Gobert (14)	Shelvin Mack (6)	Pepsi Center; 16,172	40–40
81	April 11	Dallas	L 92–101	Gordon Hayward (24)	Gordon Hayward (6)	Gordon Hayward (4)	Vivint Smart Home Arena; 19,911	40–41
82	April 13	@ L. A. Lakers	L 96–101	Trey Lyles (18)	Trey Lyles (11)	Shelvin Mack (6)	Staples Center; 18,997	40–42

2015–16 season schedule

== Player statistics ==
Legend
GP	Games played	GS	Games started	MPG	Minutes per game
FG%	Field-goal percentage	3P%	3-point field-goal percentage	FT%	Free-throw percentage
RPG	Rebounds per game	APG	Assists per game	SPG	Steals per game
BPG	Blocks per game	PPG	Points per game

=== Regular season ===
Player	GP	GS	MPG	FG%	3P%	FT%	RPG	APG	SPG	BPG	PPG
Raul Neto	81	53	18.5	.431	.395	.743	1.5	2.1	.8	.0	5.9
Joe Ingles	81	2	15.3	.426	.386	.722	1.9	1.2	.7	.0	4.2
Gordon Hayward	80	80	36.2	.433	.349	.824	5.0	3.7	1.2	.3	19.7
Trey Lyles	80	33	17.3	.438	.383	.695	3.7	.7	.3	.2	6.1
Rodney Hood	79	79	32.2	.420	.359	.860	3.4	2.7	.9	.2	14.5
Trevor Booker	79	2	20.7	.490	.293	.670	5.7	1.1	.7	.5	5.9
Chris Johnson	70	2	12.2	.371	.273	.810	1.9	.6	.5	.3	2.9
Trey Burke	64	0	21.3	.413	.344	.817	1.8	2.3	.5	.1	10.6
Derrick Favors	62	59	32.0	.515	.000	.709	8.1	1.5	1.2	1.5	16.4
Rudy Gobert	61	60	31.7	.559		.569	11.0	1.5	.7	2.2	9.1
Jeff Withey	51	10	12.9	.537	.000	.729	3.4	.4	.4	1.0	4.3
Alec Burks	31	3	25.7	.410	.405	.752	3.5	2.0	.6	.1	13.3
Shelvin Mack^{†}	28	27	31.4	.444	.357	.735	3.8	5.3	.9	.1	12.7
Elijah Millsap	20	0	8.7	.282	.083	.722	1.8	1.0	.4	.2	1.8
Tibor Pleiß	12	0	6.8	.440	.000	1.000	1.3	.2	.1	.2	2.0
Erick Green^{†}	6	0	5.8	.417	.250	1.000	.8	.3	.2	.0	2.2
J. J. O'Brien	2	0	3.0	.000			.5	.0	.5	.0	.0

- ^{†} Denotes player spent time with another team in the season. Stats reflect time with the Jazz only.
