= 2015–16 Portland Trail Blazers season =

NBA professional basketball team season

- Head coach: Terry Stotts
- General manager: Neil Olshey
- Owners: Paul Allen
- Arena: Moda Center

Results
- Record: 44–38 (.537)
- Place: Division: 2nd (Northwest); Conference: 5th (Western)
- Playoff finish: Conference semifinals (lost to Warriors 1–4)
- Stats at Basketball Reference

Local media
- Television: Comcast SportsNet Northwest, KGW
- Radio: Rip City Radio 620, Portland Trail Blazers Radio Network

The 2015–16 Portland Trail Blazers season was the franchise's 46th season in the National Basketball Association (NBA). The Trail Blazers defeated the injury depleted Los Angeles Clippers in six games in the first round. Their season ended in the next round with a defeat to the defending NBA champions and eventual Western Conference champion Golden State Warriors in five games.

This was the Blazers' first season since 2005-06 without LaMarcus Aldridge as he joined the San Antonio Spurs during the summer.

== Draft picks ==
Round	Pick	Player	Position	Nationality	School / club team
1	23	Rondae Hollis-Jefferson	SF	United States	Arizona

== Roster ==
2015–16 Portland Trail Blazers roster
Players

Pos.	No.	Player	Height	Weight	DOB	From
F	34	Cliff Alexander	6 ft 9 in (2.06 m)	240 lb (109 kg)	1995–11–16	Kansas
F	8	Al-Farouq Aminu	6 ft 9 in (2.06 m)	215 lb (98 kg)	1990–09–21	Wake Forest
G	5	Pat Connaughton	6 ft 5 in (1.96 m)	206 lb (93 kg)	1993–01–06	Notre Dame
F	23	Allen Crabbe	6 ft 6 in (1.98 m)	210 lb (95 kg)	1992–04–09	California
F	17	Ed Davis	6 ft 10 in (2.08 m)	240 lb (109 kg)	1989–06–05	North Carolina
F	4	Maurice Harkless	6 ft 9 in (2.06 m)	215 lb (98 kg)	1993–05–11	St. John's
G	9	Gerald Henderson	6 ft 5 in (1.96 m)	215 lb (98 kg)	1987–12–09	Duke
C	35	Chris Kaman	7 ft 0 in (2.13 m)	265 lb (120 kg)	1982–04–28	Central Michigan
F/C	11	Meyers Leonard	7 ft 1 in (2.16 m)	245 lb (111 kg)	1992–02–27	Illinois
G	0	Damian Lillard	6 ft 3 in (1.91 m)	195 lb (88 kg)	1990–07–15	Weber State
G	3	CJ McCollum	6 ft 4 in (1.93 m)	200 lb (91 kg)	1991–09–19	Lehigh
G	44	Luis Montero	6 ft 7 in (2.01 m)	185 lb (84 kg)	1993–04–06	Westchester CC
C	24	Mason Plumlee	6 ft 11 in (2.11 m)	235 lb (107 kg)	1990–03–05	Duke
G	2	Brian Roberts	6 ft 1 in (1.85 m)	173 lb (78 kg)	1985–12–03	Dayton
F	21	Noah Vonleh	6 ft 10 in (2.08 m)	240 lb (109 kg)	1995–08–24	Indiana

Coaches
Head coach
- Terry Stotts
Assistant(s)
- Jim Moran
- Dale Osbourne
- Nate Tibbetts
- Jay Triano
- David Vanterpool
- Chris Stackpole (player development)

Legend
- (DP) Unsigned draft pick
- (FA) Free agent
- (S) Suspended
- (DL) On assignment to D-League affiliate
- Injured

Roster
Updated: 2015–03–20

== Standings ==
=== Division ===
Northwest Division	W	L	PCT	GB	Home	Road	Div	GP
y – Oklahoma City Thunder	55	27	.671	–	32‍–‍9	23‍–‍18	13–3	82
x – Portland Trail Blazers	44	38	.537	11.0	28‍–‍13	16‍–‍25	11–5	82
e – Utah Jazz	40	42	.488	15.0	24‍–‍17	16‍–‍25	8–8	82
e – Denver Nuggets	33	49	.402	22.0	18‍–‍23	15‍–‍26	4–12	82
e – Minnesota Timberwolves	29	53	.354	26.0	14‍–‍27	15‍–‍26	4–12	82

=== Conference ===
Western Conference
#	Team	W	L	PCT	GB	GP
1	z – Golden State Warriors *	73	9	.890	–	82
2	y – San Antonio Spurs *	67	15	.817	6.0	82
3	y – Oklahoma City Thunder *	55	27	.671	18.0	82
4	x – Los Angeles Clippers	53	29	.646	20.0	82
5	x – Portland Trail Blazers	44	38	.537	29.0	82
6	x – Dallas Mavericks	42	40	.512	31.0	82
7	x – Memphis Grizzlies	42	40	.512	31.0	82
8	x – Houston Rockets	41	41	.500	32.0	82
9	e – Utah Jazz	40	42	.488	33.0	82
10	e – Sacramento Kings	33	49	.402	40.0	82
11	e – Denver Nuggets	33	49	.402	40.0	82
12	e – New Orleans Pelicans	30	52	.366	43.0	82
13	e – Minnesota Timberwolves	29	53	.354	44.0	82
14	e – Phoenix Suns	23	59	.280	50.0	82
15	e – Los Angeles Lakers	17	65	.207	56.0	82

== Game log ==
=== Preseason ===
2015 pre-season game log
Total: 3–4 (home: 2–1; road: 1–3)
Pre-season: 3–4 (home: 2–1; road: 1–3)

Game	Date	Team	Score	High points	High rebounds	High assists	Location Attendance	Record
1	October 5	Sacramento	105–109 OT	Damian Lillard (17)	Noah Vonleh (11)	Damian Lillard (4)	Moda Center; 14,976	0–1
2	October 8	Golden State	118–101	Damian Lillard (22)	Ed Davis (9)	Tim Frazier (6)	Moda Center; 19,303	1–1
3	October 10	@ Sacramento	90–94	CJ McCollum (30)	Pat Connaughton (11)	Phil Pressey (5)	Sleep Train Arena; 14,172	1–2
4	October 12	@ Utah	88–81	Meyers Leonard (19)	Meyers Leonard (8)	CJ McCollum (5)	EnergySolutions Arena; 15,171	2–2
5	October 18	Utah	116–111 OT	Damian Lillard (22)	Ed Davis (14)	CJ McCollum (9)	Moda Center; 16,352	3–2
6	October 19	@ L. A. Lakers	102–104	Damian Lillard (22)	Noah Vonleh (10)	Damian Lillard (6)	EnergySolutions Arena; 15,123	3–3
7	October 22	@ L. A. Clippers	109–115	Damian Lillard (39)	Noah Vonleh (7)	Damian Lillard (9)	Staples Center; 13,969	3–4

2015–16 pre-season schedule

=== Regular season ===
2015–16 game log
Total: 44–38 (home: 28–13; road: 16–25)
October: 1–2 (home: 1–1; road: 0–1)

Game	Date	Team	Score	High points	High rebounds	High assists	Location Attendance	Record
1	October 28	New Orleans	W 112–94	CJ McCollum (37)	Ed Davis (11)	Damian Lillard (11)	Moda Center; 19,393	1–0
2	October 30	@ Phoenix	L 92–110	Damian Lillard (24)	Al-Farouq Aminu (10)	Damian Lillard (6)	Talking Stick Resort Arena; 18,055	1–1
3	October 31	Phoenix	L 90–101	Damian Lillard (23)	Ed Davis (11)	Damian Lillard (8)	Moda Center; 17,906	1–2

November : 6–9 (home: 3–3; road: 3–6)

Game	Date	Team	Score	High points	High rebounds	High assists	Location Attendance	Record
4	November 2	@ Minnesota	W 106–101	Damian Lillard (34)	Ed Davis (11)	Damian Lillard (7)	Target Center; 18,903	2–2
5	November 4	@ Utah	W 108–92	Damian Lillard (35)	Mason Plumlee (16)	CJ McCollum (4)	Vivint Smart Home Arena; 19,911	3–2
6	November 5	Memphis	W 115–96	Damian Lillard (27)	Mason Plumlee (12)	Aminu, McCollum, Lillard (5)	Moda Center; 19,393	4–2
7	November 8	Detroit	L 103–120	Damian Lillard (26)	Al-Farouq Aminu (9)	Damian Lillard (11)	Moda Center; 19,393	4–3
8	November 9	@ Denver	L 104–108	Damian Lillard (30)	Meyers Leonard (9)	Damian Lillard (7)	Pepsi Center; 9,153	4–4
9	November 11	San Antonio	L 101–113	Damian Lillard (23)	Mason Plumlee (9)	Damian Lillard (9)	Moda Center; 19,393	4–5
10	November 13	@ Memphis	L 100–101	CJ McCollum (26)	Aminu, Davis (8)	Damian Lillard (7)	FedExForum; 16,919	4–6
11	November 15	@ Charlotte	L 94–106	Damian Lillard (23)	Mason Plumlee (13)	Damian Lillard (5)	Time Warner Cable Arena; 15,317	4–7
12	November 16	@ San Antonio	L 80–93	Damian Lillard (27)	Damian Lillard (7)	Damian Lillard (6)	AT&T Center; 18,418	4–8
13	November 18	@ Houston	L 103–108 (OT)	Damian Lillard (23)	Al-Farouq Aminu (15)	CJ McCollum (6)	Toyota Center; 17,107	4–9
14	November 20	L.A. Clippers	W 102–91	Damian Lillard (27)	Ed Davis (15)	Damian Lillard (7)	Moda Center; 19,393	5–9
15	November 22	@ L.A. Lakers	W 107–93	Damian Lillard (30)	Mason Plumlee (11)	Damian Lillard (13)	Staples Center; 18,997	6–9
16	November 24	Chicago	L 88–93	Damian Lillard (19)	Mason Plumlee (17)	Damian Lillard (8)	Moda Center; 19,393	6–10
17	November 28	L. A. Lakers	W 108–96	Damian Lillard (29)	Al-Farouq Aminu (9)	Damian Lillard (7)	Moda Center; 20,019	7–10
18	November 30	@ L. A. Clippers	L 87–102	Maurice Harkless (15)	Mason Plumlee (13)	CJ McCollum (10)	Moda Center; 19,060	7–11

December : 7–10 (home: 4–2; road: 3–8)

Game	Date	Team	Score	High points	High rebounds	High assists	Location Attendance	Record
19	December 1	Dallas	L 112–115 (OT)	Damian Lillard (25)	Ed Davis (11)	Damian Lillard (10)	Moda Center; 19,393	7–12
20	December 3	Indiana	W 123–111	Damian Lillard (26)	Ed Davis (13)	Damian Lillard (9)	Moda Center; 19,206	8–12
21	December 5	@ Minnesota	W 109–103	Damian Lillard (19)	Mason Plumlee (9)	Damian Lillard (7)	Target Center; 16,203	9–12
22	December 7	@ Milwaukee	L 88–90	Damian Lillard (23)	Ed Davis (13)	Damian Lillard (7)	BMO Harris Bradley Center; 14,389	9–13
23	December 8	@ Cleveland	L 100–105	Damian Lillard (33)	Damian Lillard (6)	Damian Lillard (6)	Quicken Loans Arena; 20,562	9–14
24	December 11	@ Phoenix	W 106–96	CJ McCollum (26)	Al-Farouq Aminu (13)	Damian Lillard (7)	Talking Stick Resort Arena; 17,028	10–14
25	December 12	New York	L 110–112	Damian Lillard (29)	Damian Lillard (8)	Damian Lillard (4)	Moda Center; 19,511	10–15
26	December 14	New Orleans	W 105–101	Damian Lillard (30)	Mason Plumlee (13)	McCollum, Plumlee (6)	Moda Center; 19,231	11–15
27	December 16	@ Oklahoma City	L 90–106	CJ McCollum (24)	Mason Plumlee (10)	CJ McCollum (4)	Chesapeake Energy Arena; 18,203	11–16
28	December 18	@ Orlando	L 94–102	CJ McCollum (29)	Mason Plumlee (10)	Damian Lillard (10)	Amway Center; 17,156	11–17
29	December 20	@ Miami	L 109–116	Damian Lillard (32)	Meyers Leonard (9)	Damian Lillard (9)	AmericanAirlines Arena; 19,600	11–18
30	December 21	@ Atlanta	L 97–106	Allen Crabbe (19)	Mason Plumlee (10)	Mason Plumlee (6)	Philips Arena; 18,373	11–19
31	December 23	@ New Orleans	L 89–115	CJ McCollum (19)	Davis, Plumlee (12)	CJ McCollum (7)	Smoothie King Center; 16,686	11–20
32	December 26	Cleveland	W 105–76	Allen Crabbe (26)	Mason Plumlee (14)	CJ McCollum (6)	Moda Center; 19,393	12–20
33	December 27	@ Sacramento	W 98–94	CJ McCollum (35)	Leonard, McCollum (11)	CJ McCollum (9)	Sleep Train Arena; 17,317	13–20
34	December 30	Denver	W 110–103	CJ McCollum (29)	Al-Farouq Aminu (9)	Aminu, McCollum, Plumlee (4)	Moda Center; 19,393	14–20
35	December 31	@ Utah	L 96–109	CJ McCollum (32)	Mason Plumlee (9)	CJ McCollum (6)	Vivint Smart Home Arena; 19,380	14–21

January : 9–5 (home: 6–4; road: 3–1)

Game	Date	Team	Score	High points	High rebounds	High assists	Location Attendance	Record
36	January 3	@ Denver	W 112–106	CJ McCollum (25)	Ed Davis (9)	CJ McCollum (7)	Pepsi Center; 11,883	15–21
37	January 4	Memphis	L 78–91	Damian Lillard (17)	Al-Farouq Aminu (14)	Damian Lillard (7)	Moda Center; 18,832	15–22
38	January 6	L. A. Clippers	L 98–109	Damian Lillard (20)	Ed Davis (12)	Damian Lillard (9)	Moda Center; 18,598	15–23
39	January 8	Golden State	L 108–128	Damian Lillard (40)	Aminu, Davis (7)	Damian Lillard (10)	Moda Center; 20,035	15–24
40	January 10	Oklahoma City	W 115–110	Damian Lillard (31)	Mason Plumlee (11)	Damian Lillard (9)	Moda Center; 19,393	16–24
41	January 13	Utah	W 99–85	Damian Lillard (21)	Ed Davis (12)	Damian Lillard (10)	Moda Center; 19,393	17–24
42	January 15	@ Brooklyn	W 116–104	Damian Lillard (33)	Ed Davis (10)	Damian Lillard (10)	Barclays Center; 14,749	18–24
43	January 16	@ Philadelphia	L 89–114	Leonard, Lillard (14)	Meyers Leonard (7)	Tim Frazier (5)	Wells Fargo Center; 15,698	18–25
44	January 18	@ Washington	W 108–98	CJ McCollum (25)	Mason Plumlee (11)	Mason Plumlee (7)	Verizon Center; 17,236	19–25
45	January 20	Atlanta	L 98–104	CJ McCollum (26)	Meyers Leonard (10)	Damian Lillard (8)	Moda Center; 18,783	19–26
46	January 23	L. A. Lakers	W 121–103	Damian Lillard (36)	Davis, Plumlee (8)	Mason Plumlee (6)	Moda Center; 19,728	20–26
47	January 26	Sacramento	W 112–97	CJ McCollum (18)	Mason Plumlee (8)	Damian Lillard (13)	Moda Center; 19,393	21–26
48	January 29	Charlotte	W 109–91	Damian Lillard (22)	Aminu, Plumlee (12)	Damian Lillard (6)	Moda Center; 19,393	22–26
49	January 31	Minnesota	W 96–93	Lillard, McCollum (21)	Noah Vonleh (8)	Damian Lillard (8)	Moda Center; 19,393	23–26

February : 9–2 (home: 5–2; road: 4–0)

Game	Date	Team	Score	High points	High rebounds	High assists	Location Attendance	Record
50	February 2	Milwaukee	W 107–95	CJ McCollum (30)	Mason Plumlee (8)	Damian Lillard (12)	Moda Center; 18,306	24–26
51	February 4	Toronto	L 103–110	Damian Lillard (27)	Ed Davis (7)	Damian Lillard (11)	Moda Center; 19,393	24–27
52	February 6	@ Houston	W 96–79	Damian Lillard (21)	Ed Davis (9)	Damian Lillard (10)	Toyota Center; 18,308	25–27
53	February 8	@ Memphis	W 112–106 (OT)	Damian Lillard (33)	Ed Davis (8)	CJ McCollum (6)	FedExForum; 15,892	26–27
54	February 10	Houston	W 116–102	Damian Lillard (31)	Davis, Plumlee (13)	Damian Lillard (9)	Moda Center; 19,393	27–27
All-Star Break
55	February 19	Golden State	W 137–105	Damian Lillard (51)	Davis, Harkless (8)	McCollum, Lillard (7)	Moda Center; 20,100	28–27
56	February 21	Utah	W 115–111	CJ McCollum (31)	Mason Plumlee (9)	Mason Plumlee (6)	Moda Center; 19,470	29–27
57	February 23	Brooklyn	W 112–104	McCollum, Lillard (34)	Mason Plumlee (13)	CJ McCollum (6)	Moda Center; 19,393	30–27
58	February 25	Houston	L 105–119	Damian Lillard (23)	Ed Davis (12)	Damian Lillard (7)	Moda Center; 19,393	30–28
59	February 27	@ Chicago	W 103–95	Damian Lillard (31)	Davis, Plumlee (9)	CJ McCollum (7)	United Center; 21,962	31–28
60	February 28	@ Indiana	W 111–102	Damian Lillard (33)	Aminu, Plumlee (9)	Allen Crabbe (4)	Bankers Life Fieldhouse; 16,662	32–28

March : 8–8 (home: 6–0; road: 2–8)

Game	Date	Team	Score	High points	High rebounds	High assists	Location Attendance	Record
61	March 1	@ New York	W 104–85	Damian Lillard (30)	Meyers Leonard (14)	Damian Lillard (6)	Madison Square Garden; 19,812	33–28
62	March 2	@ Boston	L 93–116	Damian Lillard (20)	Harkless, Leonard, Plumlee (7)	Aminu, Plumlee (3)	TD Garden; 18,624	33–29
63	March 4	@ Toronto	L 115–117	Damian Lillard (50)	Ed Davis (7)	McCollum, Lillard (5)	Air Canada Centre; 19,800	33–30
64	March 6	@ Detroit	L 103–123	Damian Lillard (26)	Henderson, Lillard (5)	McCollum, Lillard (5)	Palace of Auburn Hills; 18,386	33–31
65	March 8	Washington	W 116–109 (OT)	Damian Lillard (41)	Ed Davis (15)	Damian Lillard (11)	Moda Center; 19,393	34–31
66	March 11	@ Golden State	L 112–128	CJ McCollum (18)	Mason Plumlee (9)	Damian Lillard (5)	Oracle Arena; 19,596	34–32
67	March 12	Orlando	W 121–84	Damian Lillard (19)	Mason Plumlee (11)	Damian Lillard (10)	Moda Center; 19,452	35–32
68	March 14	@ Oklahoma City	L 94–128	Damian Lillard (21)	Mason Plumlee (8)	Damian Lillard (4)	Chesapeake Energy Arena; 18,203	35–33
69	March 17	@ San Antonio	L 110–118	CJ McCollum (26)	Ed Davis (9)	Damian Lillard (6)	AT&T Center; 18,418	35–34
70	March 18	@ New Orleans	W 117–112	Damian Lillard (33)	Ed Davis (10)	McCollum, Lillard (6)	Smoothie King Center; 17,263	36–34
71	March 20	@ Dallas	L 120–132 (OT)	Damian Lillard (26)	Mason Plumlee (19)	McCollum, Lillard (8)	American Airlines Center; 20,351	36–35
72	March 23	Dallas	W 109–103	Damian Lillard (27)	Al-Farouq Aminu (10)	Damian Lillard (6)	Moda Center; 19,819	37–35
73	March 24	@ L. A. Clippers	L 94–96	Damian Lillard (18)	Davis, Harkless (8)	Damian Lillard (8)	STAPLES Center; 19,359	37–36
74	March 26	Philadelphia	W 108–105	CJ McCollum (25)	Ed Davis (13)	Damian Lillard (7)	Moda Center; 19,506	38–36
75	March 28	Sacramento	W 105–93	Allen Crabbe (21)	Ed Davis (9)	Damian Lillard (9)	Moda Center; 19,393	39–36
76	March 31	Boston	W 116–109	Al-Farouq Aminu (28)	Maurice Harkless (10)	CJ McCollum (8)	Moda Center; 19,393	40–36

April : 4–2 (home: 3–1; road: 1–1)

Game	Date	Team	Score	High points	High rebounds	High assists	Location Attendance	Record
77	April 2	Miami	W 110–93	CJ McCollum (24)	Ed Davis (11)	CJ McCollum (7)	Moda Center; 19,633	41–36
78	April 3	@ Golden State	L 111–136	Damian Lillard (38)	Maurice Harkless (10)	Al-Farouq Aminu (5)	Oracle Arena; 19,596	41–37
79	April 5	@ Sacramento	W 115–107	CJ McCollum (30)	Maurice Harkless (16)	Damian Lillard (8)	Sleep Train Arena; 17,317	42–37
80	April 6	Oklahoma City	W 120–115	Al-Farouq Aminu (27)	Ed Davis (8)	Damian Lillard (9)	Moda Center; 19,393	43–37
81	April 9	Minnesota	L 105–106	Damian Lillard (31)	Mason Plumlee (15)	Damian Lillard (7)	Moda Center; 19,733	43–38
82	April 13	Denver	W 107–99	Damian Lillard (21)	Ed Davis (9)	Lillard, McCollum (5)	Moda Center; 19,571	44–38

2015–16 season schedule

== Playoffs ==
=== Game log ===
2016 playoff game log
Total: 5–6 (home: 4–1; road: 1–5)
First Round: 4–2 (home: 3–0; road: 1–2)

Game	Date	Team	Score	High points	High rebounds	High assists	Location Attendance	Series
1	April 17	@ L.A. Clippers	L 95–115	Damian Lillard (21)	Al-Farouq Aminu (12)	Damian Lillard (8)	STAPLES Center; 19,122	0–1
2	April 20	@ L.A. Clippers	L 81–102	Lillard, Plumlee (17)	Mason Plumlee (10)	Mason Plumlee (7)	STAPLES Center; 19,127	0–2
3	April 23	L.A. Clippers	W 96–88	Damian Lillard (32)	Mason Plumlee (21)	Mason Plumlee (9)	Moda Center; 19,761	1–2
4	April 25	L.A. Clippers	W 98–84	Al-Farouq Aminu (30)	Mason Plumlee (14)	Mason Plumlee (10)	Moda Center; 19,607	2–2
5	April 27	@ L.A. Clippers	W 108–98	CJ McCollum (27)	Mason Plumlee (15)	Damian Lillard (5)	STAPLES Center; 19,060	3–2
6	April 29	L.A. Clippers	W 106–103	Damian Lillard (28)	Mason Plumlee (14)	Damian Lillard (7)	Moda Center; 19,768	4–2

Conference Semifinals: 1–4 (home: 1–1; road: 0–3)

Game	Date	Team	Score	High points	High rebounds	High assists	Location Attendance	Series
1	May 1	@ Golden State	L 103–118	Damian Lillard (30)	Mason Plumlee (13)	Mason Plumlee (6)	Oracle Arena; 19,596	0–1
2	May 3	@ Golden State	L 99–110	Damian Lillard (25)	Mason Plumlee (11)	Damian Lillard (6)	Oracle Arena; 19,596	0–2
3	May 7	Golden State	W 120–108	Damian Lillard (40)	Al-Farouq Aminu (10)	Damian Lillard (10)	Moda Center; 19,673	1–2
4	May 9	Golden State	L 125–132 (OT)	Damian Lillard (36)	Mason Plumlee (15)	Damian Lillard (10)	Moda Center; 19,583	1–3
5	May 11	@ Golden State	L 121–125	Damian Lillard (28)	Al-Farouq Aminu (9)	Damian Lillard (7)	Oracle Arena; 19,596	1–4

2016 playoff schedule

== Player statistics ==
Legend
GP	Games played	GS	Games started	MPG	Minutes per game
FG%	Field-goal percentage	3P%	3-point field-goal percentage	FT%	Free-throw percentage
RPG	Rebounds per game	APG	Assists per game	SPG	Steals per game
BPG	Blocks per game	PPG	Points per game

=== Regular season ===
Portland Trail Blazers statistics
Player	GP	GS	MPG	FG%	3P%	FT%	RPG	APG	SPG	BPG	PPG
Al-Farouq Aminu	82	82	28.5	.416	.361	.737	6.1	1.7	.9	.6	10.2
Mason Plumlee	82	82	25.4	.516	.000	.642	7.7	2.8	.8	1.0	9.1
Allen Crabbe	81	8	26.0	.459	.393	.867	2.7	1.2	.8	.2	10.3
Ed Davis	81	0	20.8	.611		.559	7.4	1.1	.7	.9	6.5
CJ McCollum	80	80	34.8	.448	.417	.827	3.2	4.3	1.2	.3	20.8
Noah Vonleh	78	56	15.1	.421	.239	.745	3.9	.4	.3	.3	3.6
Maurice Harkless	78	14	18.7	.474	.279	.622	3.6	.9	.6	.4	6.4
Damian Lillard	75	75	35.7	.419	.375	.892	4.0	6.8	.9	.4	25.1
Gerald Henderson Jr.	72	0	19.9	.439	.353	.767	2.9	1.0	.5	.3	8.7
Meyers Leonard	61	10	21.9	.448	.377	.761	5.1	1.5	.1	.3	8.4
Tim Frazier^{†}	35	1	7.8	.333	.176	.533	1.1	1.2	.3	.0	1.5
Pat Connaughton	34	0	4.2	.265	.238	1.000	.9	.3	.1	.0	1.1
Brian Roberts^{†}	21	0	6.5	.460	.400	.800	.6	.8	.1	.0	2.9
Chris Kaman	16	2	7.0	.465	.250	1.000	1.5	.7	.1	.1	2.8
Luis Montero	12	0	3.5	.263	.111	.750	.3	.1	.0	.0	1.2
Cliff Alexander	8	0	4.5	.500			.8	.0	.1	.3	1.3

=== Playoffs ===
Portland Trail Blazers statistics
Player	GP	GS	MPG	FG%	3P%	FT%	RPG	APG	SPG	BPG	PPG
CJ McCollum	11	11	40.2	.426	.345	.804	3.6	3.3	.9	.5	20.5
Damian Lillard	11	11	39.7	.368	.393	.910	4.3	6.3	1.3	.3	26.5
Al-Farouq Aminu	11	11	33.8	.438	.400	.724	8.6	1.8	.7	.9	14.6
Mason Plumlee	11	11	27.8	.400		.636	11.8	4.8	.6	1.0	7.0
Maurice Harkless	11	11	24.7	.427	.341	.480	5.1	.6	.9	.3	11.0
Allen Crabbe	11	0	27.5	.521	.429	.737	2.9	1.4	.6	.1	9.5
Gerald Henderson Jr.	11	0	21.3	.366	.368	.750	3.2	1.5	.5	.3	6.9
Ed Davis	11	0	18.6	.525	.000	.576	6.8	1.3	.2	.6	5.5
Brian Roberts	10	0	3.6	.222	.000	.667	.1	.3	.0	.0	.8
Noah Vonleh	6	0	2.0	.000			.7	.3	.3	.0	.0
Pat Connaughton	6	0	1.3	.600	.667		.2	.0	.0	.0	1.3
Luis Montero	6	0	1.3	1.000	1.000		.0	.0	.0	.0	1.3
Chris Kaman	4	0	8.0	.389			2.0	.3	.5	.0	3.5

- ^{†} Denotes player spent time with another team in the season. Stats reflect time with the Trail Blazers only.
