= 2015–16 Brooklyn Nets season =

Season of National Basketball Association team the Brooklyn Nets

- Head coach: Lionel Hollins (fired); Tony Brown (interim)
- General manager: Billy King; Sean Marks
- Owners: Mikhail Prokhorov
- Arena: Barclays Center

Results
- Record: 21–61 (.256)
- Place: Division: 4th (Atlantic); Conference: 14th (Eastern)
- Playoff finish: Did not qualify
- Stats at Basketball Reference

Local media
- Television: YES Network, WWOR
- Radio: WFAN

The 2015–16 Brooklyn Nets season was the 40th season of the franchise in the National Basketball Association (NBA), and its fourth season playing in the New York City borough of Brooklyn.

In the off-season, the Nets let Deron Williams go after five seasons with the team. He later signed with the Dallas Mavericks.

On February 25, the Nets parted ways with All-Star Joe Johnson. Two days later, Johnson signed with the Miami Heat.

The Nets finished with a 21–61 record, their worst since moving to Brooklyn in 2012.

== Key dates ==
- January 10: the Nets fire head coach Lionel Hollins after starting the season with a 10–27 record. Tony Brown is named interim head coach.
- January 10: Billy King resigns as the general manager for the Nets.
- February 18: Sean Marks hired as the general manager of the Brooklyn Nets.

== Draft picks ==
| Round | Pick | Player | Position | Nationality | College |
|---|---|---|---|---|---|
| 1 | 29 | Chris McCullough | Power forward | United States | Syracuse |
| 2 | 41 | Pat Connaughton | Small forward | United States | Notre Dame |

The Nets traded the 41st pick and Mason Plumlee to the Blazers for the rights of the 23rd pick Rondae Hollis-Jefferson.

== Roster ==
2015–16 Brooklyn Nets roster
Players

| Pos. | No. | Player | Height | Weight | DOB | From |
|---|---|---|---|---|---|---|
| G/F | 44 | Bojan Bogdanović | 6 ft 8 in (2.03 m) | 216 lb (98 kg) | 1989-04-18 | Croatia |
| G | 22 | Markel Brown | 6 ft 4 in (1.93 m) | 190 lb (86 kg) | 1992-01-29 | Oklahoma State |
| G | 21 | Wayne Ellington | 6 ft 3 in (1.91 m) | 200 lb (91 kg) | 1987-11-29 | North Carolina |
| F | 24 | Rondae Hollis-Jefferson | 6 ft 6 in (1.98 m) | 220 lb (100 kg) | 1995-01-03 | Arizona |
| G | 2 | Jarrett Jack (injured) | 6 ft 3 in (1.91 m) | 200 lb (91 kg) | 1983-10-28 | Georgia Tech |
| G/F | 10 | Sergey Karasev | 6 ft 7 in (2.01 m) | 208 lb (94 kg) | 1993-10-26 | Russia |
| G | 6 | Sean Kilpatrick | 6 ft 4 in (1.93 m) | 219 lb (99 kg) | 1990-01-06 | Cincinnati |
| G | 0 | Shane Larkin | 6 ft 0 in (1.83 m) | 175 lb (79 kg) | 1992-10-02 | Miami (FL) |
| C | 11 | Brook Lopez | 7 ft 0 in (2.13 m) | 275 lb (125 kg) | 1988-04-01 | Stanford |
| F | 1 | Chris McCullough | 6 ft 9 in (2.06 m) | 200 lb (91 kg) | 1995-02-05 | Syracuse |
| F/C | 33 | Willie Reed | 6 ft 11 in (2.11 m) | 220 lb (100 kg) | 1990-05-16 | Saint Louis |
| F | 41 | Thomas Robinson | 6 ft 10 in (2.08 m) | 237 lb (108 kg) | 1991-03-17 | Kansas |
| F/C | 14 | Henry Sims | 6 ft 10 in (2.08 m) | 248 lb (112 kg) | 1990-03-27 | Georgetown |
| G | 15 | Donald Sloan | 6 ft 3 in (1.91 m) | 205 lb (93 kg) | 1988-01-15 | Texas A&M |
| F | 30 | Thaddeus Young | 6 ft 8 in (2.03 m) | 221 lb (100 kg) | 1988-06-21 | Georgia Tech |

Coaches
Head coach
- Tony Brown (interim)
Assistant(s)
- Jay Humphries
- Paul Westphal
- Steve Jones
- Joe Wolf
- Jim Sann (assistant coach/advanced scout)

Legend
- (DP) Unsigned draft pick
- (FA) Free agent
- (S) Suspended
- (DL) On assignment to D-League affiliate
- Injured

Roster
Updated: April 6, 2016

== Game log ==
=== Preseason game log ===
2015–16 game log
Total: 2–4 (Home: 1–2; Road: 1–2)
Pre-season: 2–4 (home: 1–2; road: 1–2)

| Game | Date | Team | Score | High points | High rebounds | High assists | Location Attendance | Record |
|---|---|---|---|---|---|---|---|---|
| 1 | October 5 | Fenerbahçe | 96–101 | Brook Lopez (18) | Thomas Robinson (16) | Shane Larkin (5) | Barclaycard Center; 6,857 | 0–1 |
| 2 | October 8 | @ Detroit | 93–83 | Larkin, Lopez (17) | Brook Lopez (9) | Donald Sloan (7) | The Palace of Auburn Hills; 10,019 | 1–1 |
| 3 | October 10 | @ Philadelphia | 95–97 | Jarrett Jack (20) | Thaddeus Young (10) | Justin Harper (3) | Wells Fargo Center; 6,737 | 1–2 |
| 4 | October 14 | Boston | 105–109 | Thaddeus Young (19) | Thomas Robinson (12) | Ryan Boatright (6) | Barclays Center; 10,482 | 1–3 |
| 5 | October 18 | Philadelphia | 92–91 | Brook Lopez (24) | Thaddeus Young (10) | Joe Johnson (6) | Barclays Center; 10,756 | 2–3 |
| 6 | October 19 | @ Boston | 105–111 | Bojan Bogdanovic (18) | Thomas Robinson (9) | Donald Sloan (6) | TD Garden; 15,540 | 2–4 |

2015–16 season schedule

| Atlantic Division | W | L | PCT | GB | Home | Road | Div | GP |
|---|---|---|---|---|---|---|---|---|
| y – Toronto Raptors | 56 | 26 | .683 | – | 32‍–‍9 | 24‍–‍17 | 14–2 | 82 |
| x – Boston Celtics | 48 | 34 | .585 | 8.0 | 28‍–‍13 | 20‍–‍21 | 10–6 | 82 |
| e – New York Knicks | 32 | 50 | .390 | 24.0 | 18‍–‍23 | 14‍–‍27 | 8–8 | 82 |
| e – Brooklyn Nets | 21 | 61 | .256 | 35.0 | 14‍–‍27 | 7‍–‍34 | 6–10 | 82 |
| e – Philadelphia 76ers | 10 | 72 | .122 | 46.0 | 7‍–‍34 | 3‍–‍38 | 2–14 | 82 |

Eastern Conference
| # | Team | W | L | PCT | GB | GP |
|---|---|---|---|---|---|---|
| 1 | c – Cleveland Cavaliers * | 57 | 25 | .695 | – | 82 |
| 2 | y – Toronto Raptors * | 56 | 26 | .683 | 1.0 | 82 |
| 3 | y – Miami Heat * | 48 | 34 | .585 | 9.0 | 82 |
| 4 | x – Atlanta Hawks | 48 | 34 | .585 | 9.0 | 82 |
| 5 | x – Boston Celtics | 48 | 34 | .585 | 9.0 | 82 |
| 6 | x – Charlotte Hornets | 48 | 34 | .585 | 9.0 | 82 |
| 7 | x – Indiana Pacers | 45 | 37 | .549 | 12.0 | 82 |
| 8 | x – Detroit Pistons | 44 | 38 | .537 | 13.0 | 82 |
| 9 | e – Chicago Bulls | 42 | 40 | .512 | 15.0 | 82 |
| 10 | e – Washington Wizards | 41 | 41 | .500 | 16.0 | 82 |
| 11 | e – Orlando Magic | 35 | 47 | .427 | 22.0 | 82 |
| 12 | e – Milwaukee Bucks | 33 | 49 | .402 | 24.0 | 82 |
| 13 | e – New York Knicks | 32 | 50 | .390 | 25.0 | 82 |
| 14 | e – Brooklyn Nets | 21 | 61 | .256 | 36.0 | 82 |
| 15 | e – Philadelphia 76ers | 10 | 72 | .122 | 47.0 | 82 |

== Regular season game log ==
2015–16 game log
Total: 21–61 (Home: 14–27; Road: 7–34)
October: 0–3 (home: 0–1; road: 0–2)

| Game | Date | Team | Score | High points | High rebounds | High assists | Location Attendance | Record |
|---|---|---|---|---|---|---|---|---|
| 1 | October 28 | Chicago | L 100–115 | Brook Lopez (26) | Joe Johnson (10) | Shane Larkin (8) | Barclays Center; 17,732 | 0–1 |
| 2 | October 30 | @ San Antonio | L 75–102 | Brook Lopez (17) | Thaddeus Young (7) | Jarrett Jack (7) | AT&T Center; 18,418 | 0–2 |
| 3 | October 31 | @ Memphis | L 91–101 | Bojan Bogdanovic (19) | Brook Lopez (10) | Jarrett Jack (9) | FedExForum; 16,013 | 0–3 |

November : 4–10 (home: 3–2; road: 1–8)

| Game | Date | Team | Score | High points | High rebounds | High assists | Location Attendance | Record |
|---|---|---|---|---|---|---|---|---|
| 4 | November 2 | Milwaukee | L 96–103 | Brook Lopez (18) | Brook Lopez (9) | Joe Johnson (6) | Barclays Center; 12,576 | 0–4 |
| 5 | November 4 | @ Atlanta | L 87–101 | Brook Lopez (27) | Brook Lopez (11) | Joe Johnson (6) | Philips Arena; 14,044 | 0–5 |
| 6 | November 6 | L.A. Lakers | L 98–104 | Brook Lopez (23) | Rondae Hollis-Jefferson (11) | Jarrett Jack (12) | Barclays Center; 17,732 | 0–6 |
| 7 | November 7 | @ Milwaukee | L 86–94 | Brook Lopez (20) | Thaddeus Young (13) | Joe Johnson (6) | BMO Harris Bradley Center; 15,228 | 0–7 |
| 8 | November 11 | @ Houston | W 106–98 | Bojan Bogdanović (22) | Brook Lopez (12) | Joe Johnson (10) | Toyota Center; 18,155 | 1–7 |
| 9 | November 13 | @ Sacramento | L 109–111 | Jarrett Jack (21) | Brook Lopez (10) | Jarrett Jack (12) | Sleep Train Arena; 17,131 | 1–8 |
| 10 | November 14 | @ Golden State | L 99–107 (OT) | Jarrett Jack (28) | Rondae Hollis-Jefferson (13) | Jarrett Jack (9) | Oracle Arena; 19,596 | 1–9 |
| 11 | November 17 | Atlanta | W 90–88 | Brook Lopez (24) | Thaddeus Young (11) | Joe Johnson (9) | Barclays Center; 12,241 | 2–9 |
| 12 | November 18 | @ Charlotte | L 111–116 | Thaddeus Young (27) | Jack, Young (8) | Jarrett Jack (9) | Barclays Center; 12,241 | 2–10 |
| 13 | November 20 | @ Boston | L 95–120 | Lopez, Young (14) | Rondae Hollis-Jefferson (11) | Jarrett Jack (5) | TD Garden; 18,361 | 2–11 |
| 14 | November 22 | Boston | W 111–101 | Brook Lopez (23) | Thaddeus Young (12) | Shane Larkin (5) | Barclays Center; 14,866 | 3–11 |
| 15 | November 25 | @ Oklahoma City | L 99–110 | Brook Lopez (26) | Rondae Hollis-Jefferson (11) | Shane Larkin (6) | Chesapeake Energy Arena; 18,203 | 3–12 |
| 16 | November 28 | @ Cleveland | L 88–90 | Brook Lopez (22) | Thaddeus Young (12) | Jarrett Jack (14) | Quicken Loans Arena; 20,562 | 3–13 |
| 17 | November 29 | Detroit | W 87–83 | Thaddeus Young (19) | Thaddeus Young (10) | Brook Lopez (5) | Barclays Center; 12,823 | 4–13 |

December : 5–10 (home: 3–7; road: 2–3)

| Game | Date | Team | Score | High points | High rebounds | High assists | Location Attendance | Record |
|---|---|---|---|---|---|---|---|---|
| 18 | December 1 | Phoenix | W 94–91 | Brook Lopez (23) | Rondae Hollis-Jefferson (9) | Jack, Larkin (8) | Barclays Center; 12,787 | 5–13 |
| 19 | December 4 | @ New York | L 91–108 | Brook Lopez (21) | Thaddeus Young (11) | Joe Johnson (4) | Madison Square Garden; 19,812 | 5–14 |
| 20 | December 6 | Golden State | L 98–114 | Thaddeus Young (25) | Thaddeus Young (14) | Shane Larkin (6) | Barclays Center; 17,732 | 5–15 |
| 21 | December 8 | Houston | W 110–105 | Brook Lopez (24) | Thaddeus Young (12) | Jarrett Jack (9) | Barclays Center; 13,319 | 6–15 |
| 22 | December 10 | Philadelphia | W 100–91 | Andrea Bargnani (23) | Thaddeus Young (11) | Jarrett Jack (8) | Barclays Center; 13,266 | 7–15 |
| 23 | December 12 | L. A. Clippers | L 100–105 | Thaddeus Young (18) | Brook Lopez (12) | Jarrett Jack (11) | Barclays Center; 15,689 | 7–16 |
| 24 | December 14 | Orlando | L 82–105 | Jarrett Jack (15) | Thaddeus Young (11) | Jarrett Jack (7) | Barclays Center; 12,946 | 7–17 |
| 25 | December 16 | Miami | L 98–104 | Brook Lopez (25) | Thaddeus Young (7) | Jarrett Jack (10) | Barclays Center; 15,113 | 7–18 |
| 26 | December 18 | @ Indiana | L 97–104 | Jarrett Jack (26) | Thaddeus Young (14) | Jarrett Jack (6) | Bankers Life Fieldhouse; 16,548 | 7–19 |
| 27 | December 20 | Minnesota | L 85–100 | Brook Lopez (20) | Brook Lopez (12) | Jack, Johnson (6) | Barclays Center; 14,552 | 7–20 |
| 28 | December 21 | @ Chicago | W 105–102 | Brook Lopez (21) | Thaddeus Young (13) | Jarrett Jack (8) | United Center; 21,825 | 8–20 |
| 29 | December 23 | Dallas | L 118–119 (OT) | Thaddeus Young (29) | Thaddeus Young (10) | Jarrett Jack (8) | Barclays Center; 15,994 | 8–21 |
| 30 | December 26 | Washington | L 96–111 | Brook Lopez (19) | Thaddeus Young (14) | Jarrett Jack (11) | Barclays Center; 17,732 | 8–22 |
| 31 | December 28 | @ Miami | W 111–105 | Brook Lopez (26) | Brook Lopez (12) | Shane Larkin (7) | American Airlines Arena; 19,975 | 9–22 |
| 32 | December 30 | @ Orlando | L 93–100 | Brook Lopez (24) | Brook Lopez (15) | Jarrett Jack (10) | Amway Center; 18,397 | 9–23 |

January : 3–13 (home: 2–8; road: 1–5)

| Game | Date | Team | Score | High points | High rebounds | High assists | Location Attendance | Record |
|---|---|---|---|---|---|---|---|---|
| 33 | January 2 | @ Boston | W 100–97 | Brook Lopez (30) | Brook Lopez (13) | Jarrett Jack (9) | TD Garden; 18,624 | 10–23 |
| 34 | January 4 | Boston | L 94–103 | Thaddeus Young (23) | Thaddeus Young (15) | Joe Johnson (4) | Barclays Center; 15,448 | 10–24 |
| 35 | January 6 | Toronto | L 74–91 | Brook Lopez (24) | Brook Lopez (13) | Shane Larkin (4) | Barclays Center; 14,544 | 10–25 |
| 36 | January 8 | Orlando | L 77–83 | Brook Lopez (17) | Thaddeus Young (9) | Donald Sloan (5) | Barclays Center; 13,907 | 10–26 |
| 37 | January 9 | @ Detroit | L 89–103 | Brook Lopez (19) | Thaddeus Young (9) | Donald Sloan (10) | Palace of Auburn Hills; 16,406 | 10–27 |
| 38 | January 11 | San Antonio | L 79–106 | Brook Lopez (18) | Thaddeus Young (9) | Donald Sloan (5) | Barclays Center; 15,214 | 10–28 |
| 39 | January 13 | New York | W 110–104 | Brook Lopez (20) | Thaddeus Young (11) | Joe Johnson (6) | Barclays Center; 15,214 | 11–28 |
| 40 | January 15 | Portland | L 104–116 | Brook Lopez (25) | Thomas Robinson (10) | Donald Sloan (10) | Barclays Center; 14,749 | 11–29 |
| 41 | January 16 | @ Atlanta | L 86–114 | Thaddeus Young (18) | Thaddeus Young (11) | Donald Sloan (12) | Philips Arena; 17,052 | 11–30 |
| 42 | January 18 | @ Toronto | L 100–112 | Brook Lopez (29) | Brook Lopez (10) | Joe Johnson (7) | Air Canada Centre; 19,800 | 11–31 |
| 43 | January 20 | Cleveland | L 78–91 | Brook Lopez (16) | Brook Lopez (10) | Donald Sloan (9) | Barclays Center; 17,732 | 11–32 |
| 44 | January 22 | Utah | L 86–108 | Bojan Bogdanovic (14) | Joe Johnson (5) | Donald Sloan (6) | Barclays Center; 12,809 | 11–33 |
| 45 | January 24 | Oklahoma City | W 116–106 | Brook Lopez (31) | Thaddeus Young (14) | Joe Johnson (6) | Barclays Center; 16,019 | 12–33 |
| 46 | January 26 | Miami | L 98–102 | Andrea Bargnani (20) | Brook Lopez (10) | Joe Johnson (8) | Barclays Center; 15,267 | 12–34 |
| 47 | January 29 | @ Dallas | L 79–91 | Brook Lopez (28) | Brook Lopez (12) | Johnson, Sloan (4) | American Airlines Center; 20,409 | 12–35 |
| 48 | January 30 | @ New Orleans | L 103–105 | Brook Lopez (33) | Brook Lopez (10) | Shane Larkin (6) | Smoothie King Center; 18,037 | 12–36 |

February : 5–7 (home: 3–4; road: 2–3)

| Game | Date | Team | Score | High points | High rebounds | High assists | Location Attendance | Record |
|---|---|---|---|---|---|---|---|---|
| 49 | February 1 | Detroit | L 100–105 | Brook Lopez (27) | Shane Larkin (6) | Shane Larkin (14) | Barclays Center; 13,290 | 12–37 |
| 50 | February 3 | Indiana | L 100–114 | Brook Lopez (21) | Thaddeus Young (14) | Joe Johnson (9) | Barclays Center; 13,311 | 12–38 |
| 51 | February 5 | Sacramento | W 128–119 | Joe Johnson (27) | Thaddeus Young (14) | Joe Johnson (11) | Barclays Center; 14,432 | 13–38 |
| 52 | February 6 | @ Philadelphia | L 98–103 | Thaddeus Young (22) | Thaddeus Young (10) | Donald Sloan (4) | Wells Fargo Center; 18,847 | 13–39 |
| 53 | February 8 | Denver | W 105–104 | Thaddeus Young (20) | Thomas Robinson (11) | Joe Johnson (8) | Barclays Center; 13,043 | 14–39 |
| 54 | February 10 | Memphis | L 90–109 | Brook Lopez (20) | Robinson, Young (9) | Donald Sloan (8) | Barclays Center; 14,262 | 14–40 |
All-Star Break
| 55 | February 19 | New York | W 109–98 | Brook Lopez (33) | Donald Sloan (10) | Joe Johnson (6) | Barclays Center; 17,732 | 15–40 |
| 56 | February 21 | Charlotte | L 96–104 | Joe Johnson (17) | Brook Lopez (10) | Brook Lopez (6) | Barclays Center; 16,155 | 15–41 |
| 57 | February 23 | @ Portland | L 104–112 | Brook Lopez (36) | Thaddeus Young (11) | Bogdanovic, Johnson, Sloan (4) | Moda Center; 19,393 | 15–42 |
| 58 | February 25 | @ Phoenix | W 116–106 | Bojan Bogdanovic (24) | Donald Sloan (9) | Donald Sloan (6) | Talking Stick Resort Arena; 16,145 | 16–42 |
| 59 | February 27 | @ Utah | W 98–96 | Thaddeus Young (21) | Thaddeus Young (8) | Donald Sloan (6) | Vivint Smart Home Arena; 18,863 | 17–42 |
| 60 | February 29 | @ L. A. Clippers | L 95–105 | Brook Lopez (25) | Thaddeus Young (11) | Shane Larkin (6) | Staples Center; 19,060 | 17–43 |

March : 4–11 (home: 3–2; road: 1–9)

| Game | Date | Team | Score | High points | High rebounds | High assists | Location Attendance | Record |
|---|---|---|---|---|---|---|---|---|
| 61 | March 1 | @ L. A. Lakers | L 101–107 | Brook Lopez (23) | Thaddeus Young (15) | Donald Sloan (6) | Staples Center; 18,997 | 17–44 |
| 62 | March 4 | @ Denver | W 121–120 (OT) | Markel Brown (21) | Markel Brown (8) | Shane Larkin (8) | Pepsi Center; 14,163 | 18–44 |
| 63 | March 5 | @ Minnesota | L 118–132 | Markel Brown (23) | Thomas Robinson (17) | Larkin, Robinson (5) | Target Center; 15,987 | 18–45 |
| 64 | March 8 | @ Toronto | L 99–104 | Brook Lopez (35) | Bogdanovic, Lopez, Robinson (5) | Donald Sloan (5) | Air Canada Centre; 19,800 | 18–46 |
| 65 | March 11 | @ Philadelphia | L 89–95 | Brook Lopez (24) | Thaddeus Young (9) | Donald Sloan (9) | Wells Fargo Center; 14,128 | 18–47 |
| 66 | March 13 | Milwaukee | L 100–109 | Brook Lopez (20) | Thaddeus Young (10) | Bojan Bogdanovic (7) | Barclays Center; 15,241 | 18–48 |
| 67 | March 15 | Philadelphia | W 131–114 | Bojan Bogdanovic (44) | Thaddeus Young (16) | Lopez, Young (4) | Barclays Center; 14,560 | 19–48 |
| 68 | March 17 | @ Chicago | L 102–118 | Bojan Bogdanovic (26) | Thaddeus Young (14) | Bogdanovic, Karasev (5) | United Center; 21,513 | 19–49 |
| 69 | March 19 | @ Detroit | L 103–115 | Thaddeus Young (24) | Thaddeus Young (9) | Donald Sloan (9) | The Palace of Auburn Hills; 17,559 | 19–50 |
| 70 | March 22 | Charlotte | L 100–105 | Brook Lopez (29) | Brook Lopez (9) | Lopez, Sloan (6) | Barclays Center; 15,739 | 19–51 |
| 71 | March 24 | Cleveland | W 104–95 | Brook Lopez (22) | Jefferson, Lopez (7) | Shane Larkin (7) | Barclays Center; 17,732 | 20–51 |
| 72 | March 26 | Indiana | W 120–110 | Brook Lopez (23) | Brook Lopez (9) | Donald Sloan (5) | Barclays Center; 16,625 | 21–51 |
| 73 | March 28 | @ Miami | L 99–110 | Brook Lopez (26) | Thaddeus Young (9) | Shane Larkin (8) | American Airlines Arena; 20,003 | 21–52 |
| 74 | March 29 | @ Orlando | L 105–139 | Thomas Robinson (18) | Thomas Robinson (12) | Markel Brown (5) | American Airlines Arena; 17,536 | 21–53 |
| 75 | March 31 | @ Cleveland | L 87–107 | Thaddeus Young (18) | Thomas Robinson (11) | Shane Larkin (8) | Quicken Loans Arena; 20,562 | 21–54 |

April : 0–7 (home: 0–3; road: 0–4)

| Game | Date | Team | Score | High points | High rebounds | High assists | Location Attendance | Record |
|---|---|---|---|---|---|---|---|---|
| 76 | April 1 | @ New York | L 91–105 | Sean Kilpatrick (17) | Thomas Robinson (13) | Shane Larkin (5) | Madison Square Garden; 19,812 | 21–55 |
| 77 | April 3 | New Orleans | L 87–106 | Sean Kilpatrick (15) | Thomas Robinson (15) | Shane Larkin (9) | Barclays Center; 16,329 | 21–56 |
| 78 | April 6 | @ Washington | L 103–121 | Thomas Robinson (23) | Thomas Robinson (10) | Shane Larkin (8) | Verizon Center; 16,846 | 21–57 |
| 79 | April 8 | @ Charlotte | L 99–113 | Wayne Ellington (21) | Thomas Robinson (17) | Shane Larkin (8) | Time Warner Cable Arena; 18,337 | 21–58 |
| 80 | April 10 | @ Indiana | L 105–129 | Sean Kilpatrick (26) | Markel Brown (12) | Shane Larkin (9) | Bankers Life Fieldhouse; 18,165 | 21–59 |
| 81 | April 11 | Washington | L 111–120 | Bojan Bogdanovic (20) | Henry Sims (8) | Shane Larkin (7) | Barclays Center; 14,653 | 21–60 |
| 82 | April 13 | Toronto | L 96–103 | Bojan Bogdanovic (29) | Henry Sims (7) | Donald Sloan (10) | Barclays Center; 16,517 | 21–61 |

2015–16 season schedule

== Player statistics ==
Legend
| GP | Games played | GS | Games started | MPG | Minutes per game |
| FG% | Field-goal percentage | 3P% | 3-point field-goal percentage | FT% | Free-throw percentage |
| RPG | Rebounds per game | APG | Assists per game | SPG | Steals per game |
| BPG | Blocks per game | PPG | Points per game |

=== Regular season ===
Brooklyn Nets statistics
| Player | GP | GS | MPG | FG% | 3P% | FT% | RPG | APG | SPG | BPG | PPG |
|---|---|---|---|---|---|---|---|---|---|---|---|
| Bojan Bogdanović | 79 | 39 | 26.8 | .433 | .382 | .833 | 3.2 | 1.3 | .4 | .1 | 11.2 |
| Shane Larkin | 78 | 17 | 22.4 | .442 | .361 | .776 | 2.3 | 4.4 | 1.2 | .2 | 7.3 |
| Wayne Ellington | 76 | 41 | 21.3 | .389 | .358 | .857 | 2.3 | 1.1 | .6 | .1 | 7.7 |
| Brook Lopez | 73 | 73 | 33.7 | .511 | .143 | .787 | 7.8 | 2.0 | .8 | 1.7 | 20.6 |
| Thaddeus Young | 73 | 73 | 33.0 | .514 | .233 | .644 | 9.0 | 1.9 | 1.5 | .5 | 15.1 |
| Thomas Robinson | 71 | 7 | 12.9 | .447 | .000 | .431 | 5.1 | .6 | .5 | .5 | 4.3 |
| Markel Brown | 62 | 6 | 15.8 | .394 | .314 | .755 | 2.0 | 1.5 | .6 | .2 | 5.9 |
| Donald Sloan | 61 | 33 | 21.6 | .440 | .384 | .750 | 2.8 | 4.4 | .5 | .1 | 7.0 |
| Joe Johnson^{†} | 57 | 57 | 33.9 | .406 | .371 | .852 | 3.9 | 4.1 | .7 | .0 | 11.8 |
| Andrea Bargnani | 46 | 0 | 13.8 | .455 | .188 | .825 | 2.1 | .4 | .1 | .2 | 6.6 |
| Sergey Karasev | 40 | 5 | 10.0 | .405 | .297 | .929 | 1.5 | .9 | .2 | .1 | 2.4 |
| Willie Reed | 39 | 2 | 10.9 | .571 | | .545 | 3.1 | .3 | .2 | .8 | 4.7 |
| Jarrett Jack | 32 | 32 | 32.1 | .391 | .304 | .893 | 4.3 | 7.4 | 1.1 | .2 | 12.8 |
| Rondae Hollis-Jefferson | 29 | 17 | 21.2 | .457 | .286 | .712 | 5.3 | 1.5 | 1.3 | .6 | 5.8 |
| Chris McCullough | 24 | 4 | 15.1 | .404 | .382 | .478 | 2.8 | .4 | 1.2 | .5 | 4.7 |
| Sean Kilpatrick^{†} | 23 | 0 | 23.2 | .462 | .361 | .898 | 2.2 | 1.1 | .4 | .1 | 13.8 |
| Henry Sims | 14 | 4 | 18.8 | .429 | | .833 | 5.1 | .6 | .6 | 1.0 | 6.5 |

- ^{†} Denotes player spent time with another team in the season. Stats reflect time with the Nets only.

== Transactions ==
=== Re-signed ===
| Player | Signed | Former Team |

=== Additions ===
| Player | Signed | Former team | Ref. |
|---|---|---|---|
| Lionel Hollins | fired | N/A | |

=== Subtractions ===
| Player | Signed | New Team |
|---|---|---|
| Joe Johnson | Waived | Miami Heat |
| Deron Williams | Waived | Dallas Mavericks |
