= Luis Montero =

Dominican basketball player (born 1993)

No. 44 – Cocodrilos de Caracas
- Position: Shooting guard
- League: SPB

Personal information
- Born: April 6, 1993 (age 33) Santo Domingo, Dominican Republic
- Listed height: 6 ft 7 in (2.01 m)
- Listed weight: 185 lb (84 kg)

Career information
- High school: Wilbraham & Monson (Wilbraham, Massachusetts)
- College: Westchester CC (2013–2014)
- NBA draft: 2015: undrafted
- Playing career: 2015–present

Career history
- 2015–2016: Portland Trail Blazers
- 2016: →Santa Cruz Warriors
- 2016–2017: Sioux Falls Skyforce
- 2017: Reno Bighorns
- 2017–2018: Detroit Pistons
- 2017–2018: →Grand Rapids Drive
- 2018: Reno Bighorns
- 2018: El Millón
- 2019: Capitanes de Ciudad de México
- 2019: Cocodrilos de Caracas
- 2019–2020: Club Atlético Platense
- 2020–2021: San Lorenzo
- 2021–2022: Cocodrilos de Caracas
- 2022: Las Fieras de La Villa
- 2023–2024: Cocodrilos de Caracas
- 2024–2025: Minas
- Stats at NBA.com
- Stats at Basketball Reference
Medals
Men's basketball
Representing the Dominican Republic
Central American and Caribbean Games
| Gold medal – first place | 2023 San Salvador | Team |

Luis David Montero Carrasco (born April 6, 1993) is a Dominican professional basketball player for Cocodrilos de Caracas of the Superliga Profesional de Baloncesto (SPB). He was considered one of the top National Junior College Athletic Association players in the United States while at Westchester Community College in Valhalla, New York.

== Early life and career ==
A native of Santo Domingo, Dominican Republic, Montero played high school basketball at Wilbraham & Monson Academy in Massachusetts. He then played college basketball for Westchester Community College in 2013–14 and averaged 15.6 points, 5.9 rebounds and 3.0 assists per game. He returned to Westchester for the 2014–15 season but their season was cancelled due to transcript issues. In January 2015, he enrolled at South Plains College with the goal of playing for them in 2015–16. However, in April 2015, he declared for the 2015 NBA draft. Montero won a gold medal with his national team at the 2023 Central American and Caribbean Games held in San Salvador, El Salvador.

== Professional career ==
=== Portland Trail Blazers (2015–2016) ===
After going undrafted in the 2015 NBA draft, Montero joined the Portland Trail Blazers for the 2015 NBA Summer League. On July 11, 2015, he signed with the Trail Blazers. He made his NBA debut on October 30 in a loss to the Phoenix Suns, recording one rebound in two minutes of action. On March 10, 2016, using the flexible assignment rule, he was assigned to the Santa Cruz Warriors, the D-League affiliate of the Golden State Warriors. On March 20, he was recalled by Portland. On October 15, 2016, he was waived by the Trail Blazers.

=== NBA D League (2016–17) ===
On October 18, 2016, Montero signed with the Miami Heat, but was waived on October 22 after appearing in two preseason games. On November 1, 2016, he was acquired by the Sioux Falls Skyforce of the NBA Development League as an affiliate player of the Heat. On March 2, 2017, Montero was traded to the Reno Bighorns.

=== NBA D League and return to South America (2017–18) ===
Montero was signed to a two-way contract by the Detroit Pistons of the NBA. Under the terms of the deal, he split time between the Pistons and their G-League affiliate, the Grand Rapids Drive. On January 13, 2018, Montero was waived by the Detroit Pistons.

On January 27, 2018, Montero was reacquired by the Reno Bighorns, but was waived in March.

In March 2018, Montero signed with El Millõn Yireh, a basketball team in the second tier of the Dominican Basketball League Torebonde Baloncesto Superior (TBS). He made his debut on March 27, in a 87–74 loss to Huellas del Siglo, and left the club at the end of the year.

=== Poland and Mexico (2018–19) ===
On August 9, 2018, Montero signed with Anwil Włocławek of the Polish Basketball League. After a few days Montero was fired by Anwil due to his failure to undergo medical tests. On January 11, 2019, Montero was reported to have signed with Capitanes de Ciudad de México of the Liga Nacional de Baloncesto Profesional (LNBP) for one month.

=== Argentina (2019–present) ===
In October 2019, Montero signed with Argentinian team Club Atlético Platense.

In October 2020, he signed with San Lorenzo of the Liga Nacional de Básquet, Argentina.

== NBA career statistics ==
Legend
| GP | Games played | GS | Games started | MPG | Minutes per game |
| FG% | Field goal percentage | 3P% | 3-point field goal percentage | FT% | Free throw percentage |
| RPG | Rebounds per game | APG | Assists per game | SPG | Steals per game |
| BPG | Blocks per game | PPG | Points per game | **Bold** | Career high |

=== Regular season ===
| Year | Team | GP | GS | MPG | FG% | 3P% | FT% | RPG | APG | SPG | BPG | PPG |
|---|---|---|---|---|---|---|---|---|---|---|---|---|
| 2015–16 | Portland | **12** | 0 | 3.5 | **.263** | **.111** | **.750** | .3 | **.1** | .0 | .0 | **1.2** |
| 2017–18 | Detroit | 2 | 0 | **4.0** | .000 | .000 | .000 | **1.0** | .0 | .0 | .0 | 0.0 |
| Career | | 14 | 0 | 3.6 | .250 | .111 | .750 | .4 | .1 | .0 | .0 | 1.0 |

=== Playoffs ===
| Year | Team | GP | GS | MPG | FG% | 3P% | FT% | RPG | APG | SPG | BPG | PPG |
|---|---|---|---|---|---|---|---|---|---|---|---|---|
| 2016 | Portland | 6 | 0 | 1.3 | 1.000 | 1.000 | .000 | .0 | .0 | .0 | .0 | 1.3 |
| Career | | 6 | 0 | 1.3 | 1.000 | 1.000 | .000 | .0 | .0 | .0 | .0 | 1.3 |

== Legal issues ==
Montero was arrested on October 25, 2018. He was charged with lewd and lavicious battery on a child and interfering with custody after he met with a 13-year-old girl at a Miami hotel for sex.
