= Cory Jefferson =

American basketball player (born 1990)

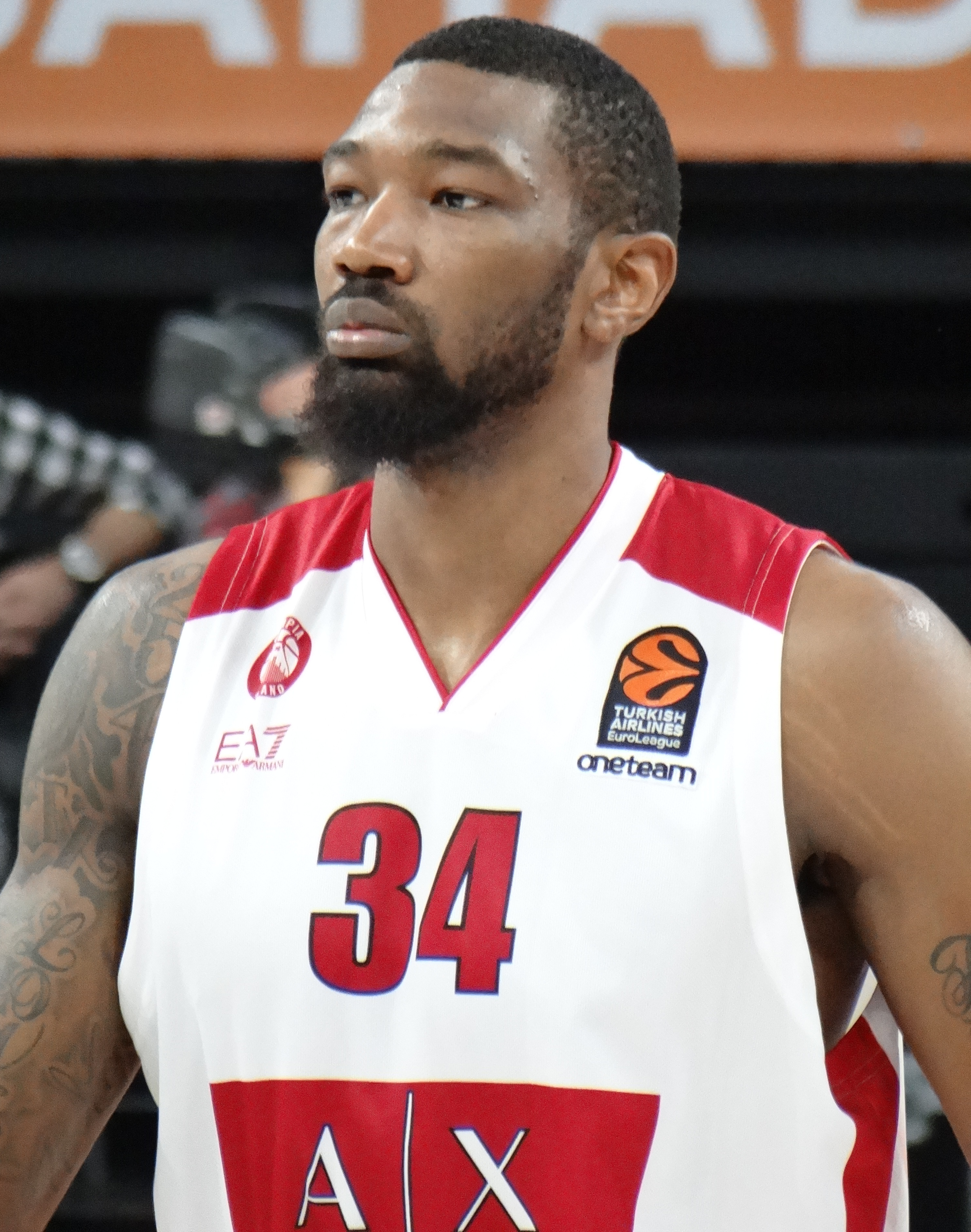
- Jefferson with Olimpia Milano in 2017

Personal information
- Born: December 26, 1990 (age 35) Tacoma, Washington, U.S.
- Listed height: 6 ft 9 in (2.06 m)
- Listed weight: 218 lb (99 kg)

Career information
- High school: Killeen (Killeen, Texas)
- College: Baylor (2009–2014)
- NBA draft: 2014: 2nd round, 60th overall pick
- Drafted by: San Antonio Spurs
- Playing career: 2014–2020
- Position: Power forward

Career history
- 2014–2015: Brooklyn Nets
- 2015: →Maine Red Claws
- 2015–2016: Phoenix Suns
- 2016: Bakersfield Jam
- 2016–2017: Austin Spurs
- 2017: Alaska Aces
- 2017–2018: Olimpia Milano
- 2018: Texas Legends
- 2018–2019: Delaware Blue Coats
- 2019: Guangzhou Long-Lions
- 2019: Gran Canaria
- 2020: Atléticos de San Germán

Career highlights
- Italian Super Cup winner (2017); NBA D-League All-Star (2017); Third-team All-Big 12 (2014); NIT champion (2013)
- Stats at NBA.com
- Stats at Basketball Reference

Cory Allen Jefferson (born December 26, 1990) is an American former professional basketball player. He played college basketball for Baylor University and represented the United States at the 2013 Summer Universiade in Kazan, Russia.

== High school career ==
Jefferson attended Killeen High School in Killeen, Texas. As a sophomore in 2006–07, he averaged 13.5 points, 10.5 rebounds and 5.1 blocks per game, earning All-District 16-4A first team honors. As a senior in 2008–09, he averaged 19.5 points and 6.2 rebounds per game, leading Killeen to three straight 30-win seasons and four consecutive district championship.

Considered a four-star recruit by Rivals.com, Jefferson was listed as the No. 13 power forward and the No. 51 player in the nation in 2009.

== College career ==
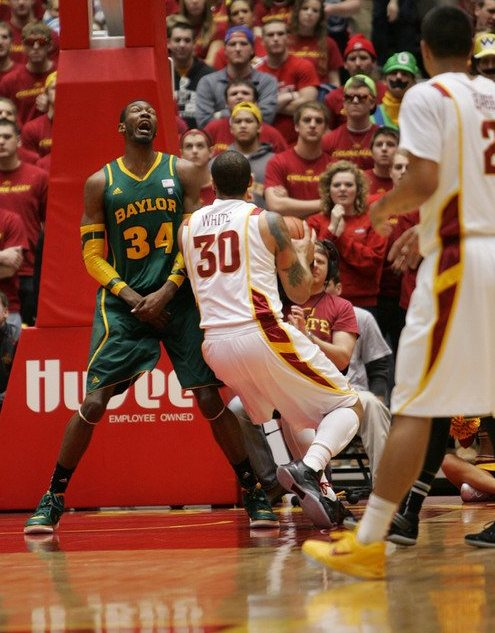
Jefferson drawing a charge

In his freshman season at Baylor, Jefferson played sparingly for the Bears. In 21 games, he averaged 1.3 points and 1.2 rebounds in 4.6 minutes per game.

After redshirting the 2010–11 season, Jefferson returned to the Bears for the 2011–12 season. In his sophomore season, he had 5 double-digit scoring and 12 multiple block games; his 42 blocks ranked 10th on Baylor's single-season list. In 34 games (one start), he averaged 3.6 points, 2.6 rebounds and 1.2 blocks in 10.5 minutes per game.

In his junior season, Jefferson was named to the NIT All-Tournament team after he helped Baylor win the NIT championship. He also earned Big 12 honorable mention honors at the end of the season. In 37 games (all starts), he averaged 13.3 points, 8.0 rebounds and 1.9 blocks in 27.9 minutes per game.

In his senior season, Jefferson was named to the 2014 All-Big 12 third team. He was also named the 2014 USBWA District VII Player of the Year. In 38 games (all starts), he averaged 13.7 points, 8.2 rebounds and 1.3 blocks in 29.0 minutes per game.

=== College statistics ===
Year	Team	GP	GS	MPG	FG%	3P%	FT%	RPG	APG	SPG	BPG	PPG
2009–10	Baylor	21	0	4.6	.391	.000	.692	1.2	.0	.1	.2	1.3
2011–12	Baylor	34	1	10.5	.522	.000	.600	2.6	.1	.2	1.2	3.6
2012–13	Baylor	37	37	27.9	.610	.333	.704	8.0	.3	.5	1.9	13.3
2013–14	Baylor	38	38	29.0	.500	.368	.640	8.2	1.0	.4	1.3	13.7
Career		130	76	19.9	.543	.340	.660	5.6	.4	.3	1.3	8.9

== Professional career ==
=== Brooklyn Nets (2014–2015) ===
On June 26, 2014, Jefferson was selected with the final pick in the 2014 NBA draft by the San Antonio Spurs. He was later traded to the Brooklyn Nets on draft night. He later joined the Nets for the 2014 NBA Summer League, and signed with the team on July 23. Jefferson received his first and only start of the season on December 13 in a 114–87 win over the Charlotte Hornets. In 23 minutes of action, he recorded 11 points on 5-of-5 shooting and 5 rebounds. On January 1, 2015, using the flexible assignment rule, the Nets assigned Jefferson to the Maine Red Claws, the affiliate of the Boston Celtics. On January 8, he was recalled by the Nets. On March 6, Jefferson recorded his first career double-double with season-highs of 12 points and 13 rebounds in over 15 minutes of action in a 108–100 overtime loss to the Phoenix Suns.

On June 29, 2015, Jefferson was named in the Nets' team for the 2015 NBA Summer League. He managed three Summer League games for the Nets before being waived by the team on July 13.

=== Phoenix Suns (2015–2016) ===
On September 16, 2015, Jefferson signed a one-year, non-guaranteed contract with the Phoenix Suns. After impressing head coach Jeff Hornacek and general manager Ryan McDonough during preseason, Jefferson made the Suns' opening night roster for the 2015–16 season. He made his debut for the Suns on November 14, recording 2 points and 2 rebounds in a 105–81 win over the Denver Nuggets. On January 7, 2016, he was waived by the Suns after appearing in just six games.

On January 20, 2016, Jefferson was acquired by the Bakersfield Jam of the NBA Development League. The next day, he returned to the Suns, signing a 10-day contract with the team. After his 10-day contract expired, playing two more games with the team in the process, he was not retained by the Suns.

=== Bakersfield Jam (2016) ===
On February 1, 2016, Jefferson was reacquired by the Bakersfield Jam. The next day, he made his debut for the Jam in a 132–111 win over the Oklahoma City Blue, recording 18 points, 14 rebounds, 3 assists and 1 block in 34 minutes.

=== Austin Spurs (2016–2017) ===
In July 2016, Jefferson joined the Cleveland Cavaliers for the 2016 NBA Summer League. On September 26, 2016, he signed with the Cavaliers, but was later waived on October 20 after appearing in six preseason games. He ultimately joined the Austin Spurs of the NBA Development League on November 12, 2016. On February 6, 2017, he was named in the Western Conference All-Star team for the 2017 NBA D-League All-Star Game.

=== Philippines (2017) ===
In March 2017, he signed with the Alaska Aces as the team's import for the 2017 PBA Commissioner's Cup.

=== Olimpia Milano (2017–2018) ===
On July 16, 2017, Jefferson signed with the Olimpia Milano of the Italian Serie A and the EuroLeague. On February 2, 2018, he parted ways with Milano.

=== Texas Legends (2018) ===
On February 22, 2018, the Texas Legends had acquired Jefferson from Agua Caliente Clippers with Clipper's 2018 NBA G League draft 4th round pick and the returning player right to Cameron Ayers.

=== Darüşşafaka (2018) ===
On July 13, 2018, Jefferson signed with the Turkish team Darüşşafaka of the EuroLeague. However, on August 18, 2018, Darüşşafaka parted ways with Jefferson after he did not pass the physical test.

=== Delaware Blue Coats (2018–2019) ===
Jefferson was signed by the Philadelphia 76ers on October 12, 2018. He was waived the next day. Jefferson was added to the Delaware Blue Coats training camp roster.

=== Guangzhou Long-Lions (2019) ===
On January 16, 2019, Jefferson signed with Guangzhou Long-Lions. Jefferson made his debut for the Long-Lions on the same day, scoring 17 points with six rebounds and a block in a 133–92 win over the Beikong Fly Dragons. On February 11, 2019, Jefferson parted-way with the Long-Lions after his import player roster spot was replaced by Lorenzo Brown.

=== Gran Canaria (2019) ===
On February 22, 2019, Herbalife Gran Canaria of the Liga ACB announced the signing of Jefferson. He and Gran Canaria parted away just after six games, on April 9, 2019.

=== Atléticos de San Germán (2020) ===
On February 22, 2020, Jefferson signed with Atléticos de San Germán of the Puerto Rican league.

On May 27, 2021, Jefferson tried out for the Big3 tryouts in Dallas and made the final 5 for a finalist spot in Las Vegas.

== NBA career statistics ==
Legend
GP	Games played	GS	Games started	MPG	Minutes per game
FG%	Field goal percentage	3P%	3-point field goal percentage	FT%	Free throw percentage
RPG	Rebounds per game	APG	Assists per game	SPG	Steals per game
BPG	Blocks per game	PPG	Points per game	**Bold**	Career high

=== Regular season ===
Year	Team	GP	GS	MPG	FG%	3P%	FT%	RPG	APG	SPG	BPG	PPG
2014–15	Brooklyn	**50**	**1**	**10.6**	**.449**	**.133**	.574	**2.9**	**.3**	**.2**	**.4**	**3.7**
2015–16	Phoenix	8	0	6.3	.409	.000	**.667**	2.0	.0	.0	.1	2.8
**Career**		58	1	10.0	.453	.125	.554	2.8	.3	.2	.4	3.5

== Personal life ==
Jefferson is the son of Fancy Pace and the late Charles Jefferson. His mother served 21 years in the military.
