= 2015–16 Phoenix Suns season =

Professional basketball season

- Head coach: Jeff Hornacek; Earl Watson (interim)
- General manager: Ryan McDonough
- Owners: Robert Sarver
- Arena: Talking Stick Resort Arena

Results
- Record: 23–59 (.280)
- Place: Division: 4th (Pacific); Conference: 14th (Western)
- Playoff finish: Did not qualify
- Stats at Basketball Reference

Local media
- Television: Fox Sports Arizona
- Radio: KTAR

The 2015–16 Phoenix Suns season was the Phoenix Suns' 48th season in the NBA. It was their first season where the arena's new name was Talking Stick Resort Arena, having played there since the 1992–93 season, when it used to be called the America West Arena and then later on, the U.S. Airways Center. The Suns failed to qualify for the playoffs for the sixth straight season.

== Key dates ==
- May 19, 2015: The NBA draft lottery took place.
- May 29, 2015: The Suns reassigned assistant coach Mark West's back into the front office as a director of player relations, promoted Corey Gaines as a full-time assistant coach again, hired Bakersfield Jam coach Nate Bjorkgren as a new assistant coach for player development, fired Kenny Gattison as an assistant coach by not renewing his contract, and fired director of player personnel John Treloar.
- June 3, 2015: Former NBA player and Austin Spurs assistant coach Earl Watson was announced as one of the newest player development assistant coaches.
- June 10, 2015: President of Basketball Operations Lon Babby announced that after his free agency stint in July, he would step down from his position and take on a new role as a senior adviser.
- June 17, 2015: Danny Granger exercised his player option with the team so he could play out the rest of his contract.
- June 25, 2015: The 2015 NBA draft took place at the Barclays Center in Brooklyn, New York; Phoenix selects Kentucky University's shooting guard Devin Booker with their 13th pick and trades their 44th pick (Kentucky University's Andrew Harrison) to the Memphis Grizzlies in exchange for back-up power forward Jon Leuer.
- June 27, 2015: Phoenix announces that former Villanova University player and Austin Spurs assistant coach Jason Fraser accepted the last open player development assistant coach role for the team.
- June 30, 2015: The Morris twins complete their first mandated court appearance after their situation with Eric Hood in January this past season. They were projected to meet again on August 3, 2015, in Arizona.
- July 1, 2015: The NBA free agency period began; Brandon Knight agreed to a 5-year, $70 million offer that was hinted earlier on in June to stay with the Suns; Dallas Mavericks center Tyson Chandler also agreed to be in Phoenix as well for a 4-year, $52 million offer.
- July 2, 2015: The Suns traded small forwards Marcus Morris, Danny Granger, and Reggie Bullock to the Detroit Pistons in exchange for the Pistons' 2020 second round selection.
- July 8, 2015: Phoenix acquired CSKA Moscow shooting guard Sonny Weems on a two-year deal (second year being a team option) worth a total of $5.8 million; Phoenix also got point guard Ronnie Price back on a one-year deal worth $1.5 million.
- July 9, 2015: Teams could sign, trade, extend, and even release players to their own accord, such as signing Tyson Chandler on his contract; Phoenix also agreed to a one-year deal worth $5.5 million with Brooklyn Nets power forward Mirza Teletović after he was released from them.
- July 17, 2015: The Suns re-signed point guard Brandon Knight and signed power forward Mirza Teletović and guards Sonny Weems and Ronnie Price; Phoenix also waived point guard Jerel McNeal's contract before it became fully guaranteed, even though the Suns' Summer League wasn't over yet.
- July 19, 2015: T. J. Warren earned All-NBA First Team Las Vegas Summer League Honors for his performance during the 2015 NBA Summer League.
- July 23, 2015: News was leaked that the Suns would reveal a new black alternate jersey for road matches only. Further information also revealed that the Suns would get a flexible, updated silhouette for a different alternative jersey.
- July 30, 2015: The Suns announced changes to their coaching staff and front office that includes the recent announcement of Bakersfield Jam general manager Bubba Barrage as the team's newest Director of Player Personnel and Antonio Williams as the newest scout, replacing the initial scouting role held by Ronnie Lester.
- August 1, 2015: Lon Babby stepped down from his old president of basketball operations role and took on the team's senior adviser role; Ryan McDonough then took on that role as well.
- August 3, 2015: Markieff Morris and his traded brother were scheduled to return to Phoenix to complete their second mandated court appearance with the Eric Hood case. However, neither brother showed up and their attorneys asked for their court appearance that day to be waived. As a result, their next pre-trial conference was delayed to September 16, 2015.
- August 12, 2015: The NBA announced all team schedules for the 2015–16 season, with the Suns opening their season on October 28, 2015, against the Dallas Mavericks, Tyson Chandler's former team.
- August 24, 2015: The Suns announced that they would put their superstar point guard Steve Nash into the Phoenix Suns Ring of Honor on their October 30, 2015 game against the Portland Trail Blazers, which was also rookie Devin Booker's 19th birthday.
- September 8, 2015: The Phoenix Suns revealed their newest black alternate jerseys, updated their orange alternate jersey, revealed their updated court design (with the main feature showcasing that the team replaced the "SUNS" ambigram with their old Sunburst logo similar to what they had during the 1990s), and unveiled their new Civic Pride "We Are PHX" movement to the media. The event included Kentucky University alumni Eric Bledsoe, rookie Devin Booker, Archie Goodwin, and Brandon Knight, as well as small forward P. J. Tucker, the newly acquired power forward Jon Leuer, coach Jeff Hornacek, Suns president Jason Rowley, and Phoenix mayor Greg Stanton; the league also fines Markieff Morris $10,000 due to his trade demand comments he's made throughout the past month or two.
- September 16, 2015: The Morris twins requested a new grand jury as a new mandated appearance after missing their August meeting. Both sides had to have written arguments for and against a new grand jury to precise over the twins' case. Their next meeting took place on October 15, 2015, although neither appeared in court due to their respective obligations to the Suns and Pistons. If their request was denied, the earliest next court date could be November 5, 2015; otherwise, the case would be held back all the way until May 31, 2016. The Suns' signing of Cory Jefferson (and other training camp invitees) became official that day.
- September 28, 2015: The deadline for all signed players to report to their teams took effect as training camp commenced in Flagstaff; Markieff Morris was the last player to show up for the team when everyone else had been training with each other for at least two weeks.
- October 3, 2015: The Suns concluded their training camp practices before the start of the pre-season by having a friendly match between themselves at the Veterans Memorial Coliseum. Team MacLeod barely beat out Team Cotton by the final of 67–66.
- October 26, 2015: The player options of center Alex Len, shooting guard Archie Goodwin, and small forward T. J. Warren get picked up for the 2016–17 NBA season.
- October 28, 2015: The Suns started the regular season with a home game against Tyson Chandler's former team, the Dallas Mavericks; Devin Booker made his debut as the first player in the NBA at 18 years old who also had at least one year of college experience.
- October 30, 2015: Steve Nash became the 10th player to enter the Phoenix Suns Ring of Honor during the second home game of the season against the Portland Trail Blazers; Devin Booker turns 19 years old during the team's first victory of the season.
- November 25, 2015: The Suns sign Tucson, Arizona native Bryce Cotton on a one-year deal after injuries to back-up point guard Ronnie Price, as well as to starting point guard Eric Bledsoe occurred earlier in the season.
- December 15, 2015: The starting point for signed free agents to be traded to different teams commences.
- December 26, 2015: Eric Bledsoe tore his left meniscus and is out for the rest of the season.
- December 27, 2015: The Suns fired assistant coaches Jerry Sichting and Mike Longabardi for their poor performances throughout the month of December.
- January 5, 2016: Teams can sign players for 10-day contracts.
- January 6, 2016: After winning their first game of the new year, the Suns decided to waive away the non-guaranteed deals of Cory Jefferson and Bryce Cotton.
- January 7, 2016: The Suns signed Lorenzo Brown, former college teammate of T. J. Warren's, to a 10-day contract.
- January 15, 2016: Contracts for players signed earlier in free agency for teams over the salary cap are now fully guaranteed for the season.
- January 18, 2016: The Suns re-signed Lorenzo Brown to his second 10-day contract.
- January 21, 2016: Phoenix re-signed former Suns player Cory Jefferson to a 10-day contract after all of the previous power forwards wound up injured.
- January 23, 2016: In a close 98–95 victory over the Atlanta Hawks, Tyson Chandler became the first Phoenix Suns player to record multiple games of 20+ rebounds with the team, tied Paul Silas' record for rebounds in one game with 27, and set a new offensive rebounding record with 13, beating out both Charles Barkley and Curtis Perry there in the process.
- January 26, 2016: With a 113–103 loss, the Suns would earn the dubious honor to be the only team to get swept by the 76ers who would finish 10–72, one of the worst seasons in NBA history.
- January 28, 2016: The Suns decided to not sign Lorenzo Brown for the entire year, instead giving Jordan McRae (who held the highest-scoring effort in D-League history) a 10-day contract.
- February 1, 2016: Head coach Jeff Hornacek was fired after a generally awful season and replaced by assistant coach Earl Watson for the rest of the season; Bob Hill (a former head coach for the San Antonio Spurs and Seattle SuperSonics) took the vacant assistant coach role left by Watson; rookie Devin Booker was announced as a participant for the three-point shootout.
- February 2, 2016: Before the beginning of Phoenix's 7-game home stand (9 in 10 games) in February, it was announced that small forward T. J. Warren would be out for the rest of the season due to a broken foot he had sustained during a game against the Cleveland Cavaliers in January.
- February 5, 2016: The Suns signed Orlando Johnson to a 10-day contract days after finding out small forward T. J. Warren would be out for the rest of the season.
- February 8, 2016: Phoenix re-signed Jordan McRae to his second 10-day contract moving forward.
- February 10, 2016: Devin Booker was announced as a participant for All-Star Friday's NBA Cares Special Olympics Unified Basketball Game.
- February 11, 2016: It was announced, a day before the actual event began, that rookie Devin Booker was a contestant for the Rising Stars Challenge after Philadelphia 76ers sophomore power forward/center Nerlens Noel injured himself before the event took place.
- February 12, 2016: The NBA All-Star Weekend taking place in Toronto, Ontario, Canada began.
- February 18, 2016: The NBA trade deadline takes full effect; Phoenix traded away Markieff Morris to the Washington Wizards in exchange for DeJuan Blair, Kris Humphries, a top-9-protected first-round draft pick, and a $1.56 million traded player exception; the Suns also waived Orlando Johnson to make room for their newest players.
- February 20, 2016: The Suns signed former Philadelphia 76ers and Idaho Stampede point guard Phil Pressey to a 10-day contract after deciding not to sign Jordan McRae for the rest of the year.
- February 22, 2016: The Suns waived DeJuan Blair.
- February 24, 2016: The Suns signed former Dallas Mavericks shooting guard John Jenkins to a three-year contract (two years non-guaranteed) two days after deciding to waive DeJuan Blair from the roster.
- February 28, 2016: After getting their only victory in the month of February, the Suns decided to buy out Kris Humphries' contract (the other player acquired in the Markieff Morris trade) that he first signed with the Washington Wizards in order for it to not affect their salary cap.
- March 1, 2016: The Suns re-signed Phil Pressey to his second 10-day contract.
- March 5, 2016: After winning their first road game of the season since December 7, 2015, against the Chicago Bulls with a blowout win against the Orlando Magic, the Suns waived Sonny Weems due to his poor performances throughout the season.
- March 6, 2016: The road victories the Suns recorded against the Orlando Magic two nights ago and the Memphis Grizzlies that night were exactly a year since the Suns last won two straight games on the road on March 4 and March 6, 2015.
- March 8, 2016: After winning their second game in a row by beating the Memphis Grizzlies on the road, the Suns signed former Indiana Pacers and Arizona Wildcats small forward Chase Budinger and former California–Santa Barbara Gauchos and Qingdao DoubleStar Eagles center and Phoenix, Arizona, native Alan Williams to a one-year deal and a 10-day contract respectively.
- March 11, 2016: The Suns decided not to sign Phil Pressey for the rest of the season after finding out Brandon Knight was healthy enough to return to action for the season.
- March 18, 2016: Phoenix native Alan Williams signed for the rest of the season, with an option to play for the Suns next season and also participate in their Summer League team after this season.
- April 1, 2016: Brandon Knight was announced out for the rest of the season due to a sports hernia he reaggravated on his debut as a road opponent against his former team, the Milwaukee Bucks, after trying to dunk on Giannis Antetokounmpo. He was fouled on the play in question.
- April 5, 2016: Forward Mirza Teletović broke the record set by former San Antonio Spurs' Chuck Person at the time during the 1994–95 season to make the most three-pointers as a reserve player with his 165th three-pointer during a loss against the Atlanta Hawks. He finished the season with 179 three-pointers off the bench.
- April 8, 2016: Brandon Knight had surgery on his hernia in Philadelphia.
- April 9, 2016: Rookie Devin Booker recorded his 1,000th point with 10:51 left in the first quarter during a 121–100 blowout victory over the New Orleans Pelicans, thus becoming the fourth-youngest player to record 1,000 points in a season, the third-youngest to do it in his rookie season, and the sixth-overall player to record 1,000 points as a teenager.
- April 11, 2016: It was announced that the Phoenix Suns would take full control over their D-League affiliate team, the Bakersfield Jam, and move them into the Prescott Valley Event Center in Prescott Valley, Arizona as the Northern Arizona Suns, starting after this season ended. The Suns thereby became one of 19 NBA teams (as of this season) to have complete control over a single D-League affiliate team.
- April 19, 2016: The Suns announced that Earl Watson was no longer the interim head coach, and was the full-time head coach for the next three years, effective this new season.
- May 16, 2016: Devin Booker was voted fourth in the NBA Rookie of the Year Award voting segment, finishing behind Nikola Jokić, Kristaps Porziņģis, and his former college teammate Karl-Anthony Towns.
- May 19, 2016: Booker was announced as a part of the NBA All-Rookie First Team, joining Towns, Porziņģis, Jokić, and the Philadelphia 76ers' Jahlil Okafor. Booker also became the first Suns rookie to join an All-Rookie team (either first or second) since Amar'e Stoudemire in 2003, when he also won the NBA Rookie of the Year Award.

== Offseason ==
=== Draft picks ===
| Round | Pick | Player | Position | Nationality | College |
|---|---|---|---|---|---|
| 1 | 13 | Devin Booker | Shooting guard | United States | Kentucky |
| 2 | 44 | Andrew Harrison | Point guard | United States | Kentucky |

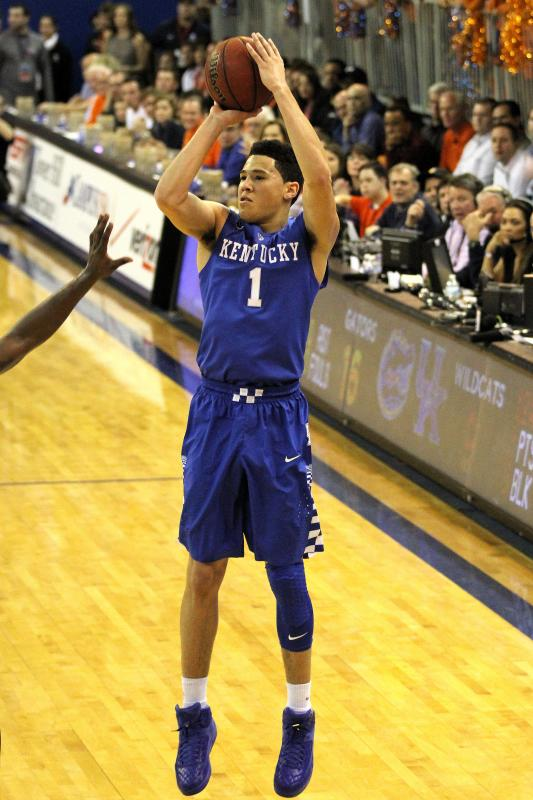
Devin Booker was selected by the Suns as their 13th pick during the 2015 NBA draft.

The Phoenix Suns have only one first-round pick and one second-round pick this season. Their sole first-round pick was their own that was also a part of the NBA draft lottery. The Suns initially had two other draft picks as well (one from the Minnesota Timberwolves and the other from the Los Angeles Lakers, both of which were coincidentally the top picks of this season's draft), but they were both involved with trades the Suns made last season. Minnesota's first-round pick (which had lottery protections this season) was traded to the Boston Celtics, where Phoenix got center Brandan Wright in exchange. However, the Lakers' pick (which was top 5 protected this season) was moved in the trade deadline extravaganza of 2015, with Phoenix gaining guard Brandon Knight from the Milwaukee Bucks (as well as other players and future first-round draft picks) in exchange for Milwaukee gaining the Suns' center Miles Plumlee and then-rookie point guard Tyler Ennis, as well as the Philadelphia 76ers' point guard Michael Carter-Williams, and Philadelphia getting the Lakers' protected first-round pick out of it. The lone second-round pick they have is also the pick they had on their own accord in spite of having a declining record when compared to two seasons ago in the process.

With the 13th pick, the Suns selected shooting guard Devin Booker from Kentucky University. Booker averaged 10 points off of 47% overall shooting, 2 rebounds, and 1.1 assists during 21.5 minutes of play in Kentucky's near-undefeated season as a bench player. As a result, Booker became the Southeastern Conference's Sixth Man of the Year for, and made it to the All-SEC Second Team and the SEC All-Freshmen Team. Despite coming off the bench during his college season, Booker was the most immediately successful rookie the Suns drafted (and was kept by them) in over a decade, not only finishing fourth in the NBA Rookie of the Year Award voting, but also being the first Suns rookie to make it to any All-Rookie team since 2003. With the 44th pick, the Suns selected another player from the University of Kentucky, point guard Andrew Harrison. However, the Suns traded Harrison's rights to the Memphis Grizzlies for power forward Jon Leuer. As the starting point guard with the Wildcats for two seasons, Harrison had averaged 10.1 points, 3.8 assists, and 2.7 rebounds, but his output decreased during his second season, and was considered a likely reason for Harrison's drop from being a considered first-round talent to falling around the middle of the second round. Another player that the Suns got, who had entered the 2015 NBA draft via graduation, but wasn't drafted, was Phoenix native Alan Williams, an undersized center/power forward from the University of California, Santa Barbara. He was well known for his rebounding abilities, to the point where he earned best rebounding numbers in not just college at his junior and senior years (even winning the Big West's Player of the Year as a junior), but also was the leading rebounder in China for the Qingdao DoubleStar Eagles.

=== Free agency ===
Players Brandan Wright, Gerald Green, and Marcus Thornton; as well as the returning Earl Barron all became unrestricted free agents as of the end of the 2014–15 NBA season. In addition, combo guard Brandon Knight ended up being a restricted free agent. Small forward Danny Granger was also considered a candidate for unrestricted free agency, but he ended up exercising his player option to take on his final year of his contract for the rest of this season on June 17, 2015. Not only that, but one recent trade the Suns made by trading their most recent second round selection to Memphis for power forward Jon Leuer was fully guaranteed for the rest of the season after having his rights remain with the team after June 29, 2015. Point guard Jerel McNeal also had a team option that would make him an unrestricted free agent, but it had to be decided upon and met before July 21, 2015, which was around the time Phoenix's Summer League campaign ended and a good portion of free agency had been completed. However, unlike the other players that had team options with the Suns, McNeal was waived four days before his contract was guaranteed, on July 17, 2015, during the Summer League, due to his less than stellar performance there.

To start their free agency push, the Suns decided to lock down their biggest trade deadline piece last season, Brandon Knight, to a 5-year deal worth $70 million (the same deal offered to point guard Eric Bledsoe a year earlier) on July 1, 2015. In addition to keeping Brandon Knight, the Suns also signed up 2011 NBA Finals champion center Tyson Chandler on exactly the same day. The signing of Tyson came in conjecture to the Suns' personal meeting with Portland Trail Blazers free agent power forward LaMarcus Aldridge as well for the chance to lure him over to Phoenix. In the meantime, Brandan Wright was lost to the Memphis Grizzlies when he signed a 3-year deal worth $18 million. A day later, the Suns traded small forwards Marcus Morris, Danny Granger, and Reggie Bullock to the Detroit Pistons in exchange for the Pistons' 2020 second round selection. This move was considered a way for Phoenix to sign LaMarcus Aldridge without taking any hits on their salary cap; unfortunately for the Suns, on July 4, Aldridge instead decided to go to the rival San Antonio Spurs.

After failing to sign Aldridge, the Suns decided to sign CSKA Moscow shooting guard Sonny Weems to a two-year deal worth $5.8 million (with a team option on the second year) and former 2011–12 Phoenix Suns point guard Ronnie Price on a one-year deal worth $1.5 million (the veteran's minimum) on July 8, 2015. A day later, it was announced that the Brooklyn Nets' power forward Mirza Teletović from the nation of Bosnia & Herzegovina would sign a one-year deal worth $5.5 million, while Gerald Green would sign a one-year deal worth $3 million with the Miami Heat. Four days after the July moratorium ended, the Suns' Marcus Thornton, who they got after their trade with Isaiah Thomas signed a one-year, veteran's minimum deal with the Houston Rockets. On July 31, it was revealed that Jerel McNeal would sign to play for Aris Thessaloniki in Greece instead. After that, on September 25, 2015, center Earl Barron signed a training camp deal to play with the Atlanta Hawks Basketball Club after former Suns player Jason Richardson announced his retirement due to an injury that he feared put his health at risk, although Barron played for the Fubon Braves in Taiwan on November 17, 2015, after failing to make their regular season rotation.

On August 20, 2015, the Suns agreed to training camp deals with former Ole Miss and Yenisey Krasnoyarsk shooting guard Terrico White and former Harvard and Helios Suns Domžale small forward Kyle Casey. Five days afterwards, the Suns also decided to add former Philadelphia 76ers center Henry Sims and former Brooklyn Nets power forward Cory Jefferson towards their training camp roster as more likely potential additions to the team, as well as former Nevada Wolf Pack and Ratiopharm Ulm point guard Deonte Burton. However, all of those signings were not official until September 16, 2015. Burton did not train with the team at all and instead became the first player to be cut on October 3, 2015, which was before the team's scrimmage at the Veterans Memorial Coliseum. After that, the Suns waived both Terrico White and Kyle Casey from their roster on October 15, 2015, two days after their overtime loss to the Houston Rockets. Finally, on October 24, 2015, the Suns decided to waive Henry Sims from the roster and sign last year's Mr. Irrelevant Cory Jefferson to a non-guaranteed deal for the season. All waived players except for Henry Sims later joined the Bakersfield Jam. Sims joined the Grand Rapids Drive on November 12, 2015, instead. However, of all the players there that were training camp invites, only Sims found his way back into the NBA again, signing a deal to play with the Brooklyn Nets on March 17, 2016.

On November 25, 2015, the Suns signed Tucson, Arizona native Bryce Cotton to a one-year deal as insurance in the event either Ronnie Price or Eric Bledsoe were out of commission. He made his debut over a month later due to an injury involving Eric Bledsoe. Cotton previously played point guard for the Austin Spurs in the D-League (twice) and the Utah Jazz before signing his deal to play for the Suns. On January 6, 2016, after winning at home against the Charlotte Hornets, the Suns decided to waive both Cory Jefferson and Bryce Cotton's non-guaranteed deals. To make up for these moves, they announced that Grand Rapids Drive point guard Lorenzo Brown signed a 10-day contract to determine his future value to the team, especially as a backup point guard since Bledsoe was out for the rest of the season. Brown performed well enough to sign a second 10-day contract, especially with Ronnie Price out around that timeline. On January 21, 2016, the Suns decided to have Jefferson return to the roster for a 10-day contract due to the team's power forwards all being out of commission during the January 19 game against the Indiana Pacers. However, on January 28, 2016, Phoenix decided to sign former Philadelphia 76ers selection Jordan McRae to a 10-day contract in order to replace Lorenzo Brown after his second 10-day contract expired. In the meantime, the Suns decided to not extend Cory Jefferson's deal (again) after most of the team's power forwards returned healthy on January 31, 2016.

During Jordan McRae's first 10-day stint, Phoenix decided to sign another 10-day contract out for former NBA and Austin Spurs player Orlando Johnson on a 10-day contract on February 5, 2016, due to the season-ending injury of T. J. Warren earlier in the month of February. After trading Markieff Morris away to the Washington Wizards, the Suns decided to both waive Orlando Johnson's 10 day contract and let go of Jordan McRae after his second 10-day contract expired in order to replace them with former Philadelphia 76ers and Idaho Stampede point guard Phil Pressey for 10 days, starting on February 20, 2016. Furthermore, after waiving DeJuan Blair from the roster, the Suns decided to sign former Dallas Mavericks shooting guard John Jenkins to a 3-year contract (two years non-guaranteed) on February 24, 2016. In addition, they waived Kris Humphries (from their Markieff Morris trade) and one of their recent free-agent signings in Sonny Weems on February 28 and March 5, 2016, respectively. To replace Weems, though, the Suns decided to sign former Indiana Pacers and Arizona Wildcats forward Chase Budinger for the rest of the season on March 8, 2016. Furthermore, on the same day, the Suns signed former Qingdao DoubleStar Eagles and California–Santa Barbara Gauchos center/power forward Alan Williams (a Phoenix, Arizona native) to a 10-day contract to replace Humphries in case either Alex Len or Tyson Chandler got injured again. While Phil Pressey did not sign with the team for the rest of the season due to the return of Brandon Knight as the starting point guard on March 11 (even after Knight had his own season-ending injury later on), Alan Williams got to sign for not just the rest of this season, but also the next season on March 18, 2016, thus finally ending the Suns' free agency spree that season.

==== The Morris twins situation ====
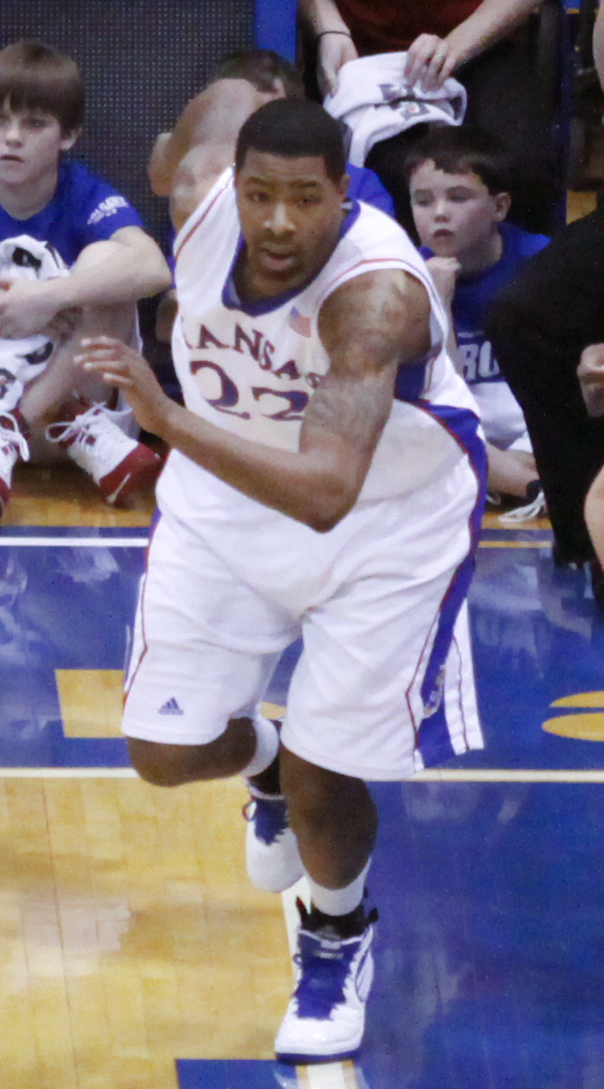
Marcus Morris was traded to the Detroit Pistons on July 2, 2015, alongside fellow small forwards Reggie Bullock and Danny Granger for a future draft pick for both legal and free agent reasons. Both Marcus and his twin brother would later be deemed not guilty for their involvement in an incident with their former mentor, Erik Hood.

For a majority of the past two seasons, many of the problems the team had there as a whole were projected by many fans as problems relating to that of the Morris twins' behaviors (primarily the behavior of Markieff Morris for this season). Before the start of the season, both Markieff and his twin brother Marcus Morris were subject to many problems both on and off the court, from behaving poorly in front of (now former) head coach Jeff Hornacek to getting multiple technical fouls (some of which occurred in costly situations that season) to calling out the team's fanbase for not stepping up properly to even having an upcoming court case involving a former mentor of theirs named Erik Hood. In an attempt to help cool down the problem earlier on before this season began, the Suns decided to trade what was considered (at the time) the lesser-talented twin brother (Marcus) alongside their influx of small forwards in Reggie Bullock and Danny Granger to the Detroit Pistons on July 2, 2015, in exchange for a 2020 second-round draft pick in what was seen as an effort to open up cap space to lure LaMarcus Aldridge away from both the Portland Trail Blazers and the San Antonio Spurs. When that failed, Marcus started lambasting the team's front office and fans for not inquiring with them about the oncoming trade when it happened. Furthermore, it was revealed that on August 3, 2015, both of the Morris twins failed to show up for the pretrial conference that was set for them on that date, which forced the judicial system to delay the case until September 16, 2015. The twins' trail continued well beyond this season, and to the next when they requested a new grand jury, and then having the trial be further delayed to gather evidence on the text messages sent between Eric Hood and Thomasine "Angel" Morris, the other victim in question. The twins' trial continued until October 3, 2017, due to their conflicting schedules as NBA players on different teams by that point in time, where the judge deemed the twins (and former Baltimore Ravens safety Gerald Bowman) not guilty for the attack on Hood due to his story changing from both of the twins being involved in attacking him to just Marcus attacking him, while the other two attackers involved (Julius Kane & Christopher Melendez Jr.) admitted their guilt in the attack earlier on back in September 2017. Nevertheless, the trial's results would not change the fates of the twins after the July trade involving Marcus Morris.

On August 11, 2015, Markieff Morris revealed to The Philadelphia Inquirer that he wanted to be traded out of Phoenix, mainly due to how he and his twin brother were notified of the news of the Detroit Pistons trade on July 2, 2015, where Markieff's brother was traded alongside Reggie Bullock and Danny Granger for the Pistons' 2020 second round selection. He was fined $10,000 for his comments. Four days later, he stated his preference to play for either the Houston Rockets (Marcus' original team) or the Toronto Raptors, but he wouldn't mind any other location like the Washington Wizards as well. However, the Suns decided to counter Markieff's demands by saying they would not trade him due to his importance to the team around that time. Despite that notion, he remained adamant about his decision by posting out on his Twitter account that his future would not be in Phoenix, just a day after the Suns wished Markieff a happy 26th birthday, and continued with the attitude a week later saying he won't accept any apologies from the team. At the end of the offseason, though, Markieff remained on the team throughout most of the season, with Marcus continuing to bash the team and their fanbase along the way as a Detroit Pistons player, even claiming he was never really a Phoenix Suns player. It was later revealed that the Suns had tried to work out a trade involving Markieff for eight months before it was finally completed in February, with general manager Ryan McDonough stating that if a better deal for Markieff had come before the start of the season, it would have been done by then. The problem was stated that Markieff himself didn't do the team any favors throughout the majority of the season between his court case with his brother and worries that the behavior he had at the start of the season there would continue for other teams afterwards.

While Markieff suggested that he had learned from the mistakes he made during the summertime, he continued to have problems with the team and even struggled with his performance after his first ever injury as a player in the middle of November. After his injury, Markieff was relegated to a bench role, with times that he didn't even play at all for various reasons. His performance dropped even further from averaging around 13 points and 5 rebounds in 27 minutes of action in November to 6.4 points and 2.9 rebounds in 17 minutes of action in December, with Jon Leuer replacing Markieff at points. It soon reached a point on December 23, 2015, against the Denver Nuggets (which was also the last full game Eric Bledsoe played before a season-ending knee injury three days later) where Markieff threw a towel (accidentally) at head coach Jeff Hornacek after being frustrated at a play. The incident drew parallels to when former Suns player Robert Horry threw a towel at former Suns head coach Danny Ainge back in the 1996–97 Phoenix Suns season. Like Horry, Morris was suspended for two games without pay. However, unlike the Horry situation, Markieff remained with the team for not just the rest of December, but also for the entirety of January and halfway through February. Markieff also ended up lasting longer than Hornacek and two of his top assistants, Jerry Sichting and Mike Longabardi (the latter of which won the 2016 NBA Finals championship later on in the season with the Cleveland Cavaliers). It also caused the Suns to stop playing Markieff altogether for a good amount of time, only relenting with all of their power forwards starting to get injuries during the month of January at certain points.

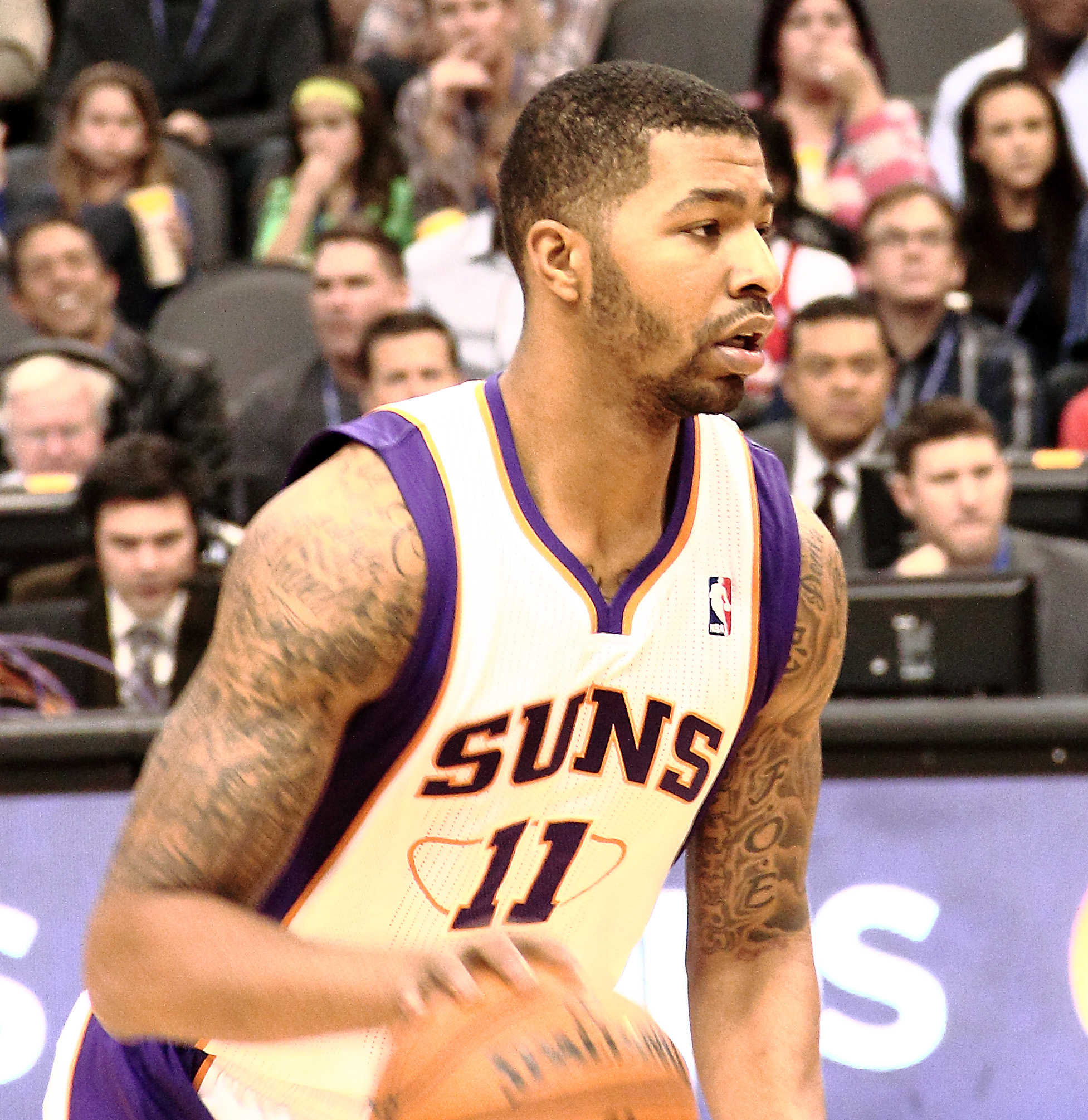
Markieff Morris eventually got traded to the Washington Wizards for young talent in a 2016 first-round draft pick named Marquese Chriss on February 18, 2016.

When head coach Jeff Hornacek was fired on February 1, 2016, and assistant(/former player development) coach Earl Watson replaced him as interim head coach for the rest of the season, Watson tried to designate Markieff as the team's newest leader after having injuries decimate their entire roster. During the five games Morris held that designation, he recorded his best averages for the Suns with 20.7 points, 7.6 rebounds, and 4.6 assists in over 30 minutes of action, even though the team did not win any of those games around that period of time. However, the breaking point for Markieff and the Suns came under Morris' last game on February 9, 2016, against the defending champion Golden State Warriors, where during the first timeout of the game in the first quarter, Markieff went after his teammate Archie Goodwin due to Goodwin not performing well at the time. While the Suns lost a relatively close match to the Warriors, they soon realized that enough was enough with Markieff (and later Goodwin), and then asked to have a first-round draft pick and a young player in return for Markieff to go far away from their franchise forever. At the end of the February 18, 2016 trade deadline, despite him wanting to stay with the team by then, the other Morris brother was traded to the Washington Wizards in exchange for power-forward/center combo players DeJuan Blair and Kris Humphries, as well as a top-9 protected 2016 first-round draft pick and a $1.56 million traded player exception. Four days after the trade, though, the Suns waived Blair. To replace him, the Suns decided to use their traded player exception to sign John Jenkins to a three-year contract (with the second and third years being non-guaranteed) for the league minimum. Furthermore, the Suns also decided to buy out Kris Humphries' contract that he had for two more years (including this one) on February 28, 2016, in order to help get him to a playoff team in the Atlanta Hawks, while also replacing Humphries with Phoenix, Arizona native Alan Williams to a 10-day contract on March 8, 2016, and then for the rest of the season on March 18, 2016. Both the first-round pick from Markieff (which became Georgios Papagiannis) and the 2020 second-round pick from Marcus (which eventually became Xavier Tillman) were later traded to the Sacramento Kings as part of a deal in exchange for Marquese Chriss, who was the 8th pick in the 2016 NBA draft.

=== Coaching changes ===
On May 29, 2015, it was announced that assistant coach Kenny Gattison was leaving the team and former Phoenix Mercury coach and Suns player development coach Corey Gaines was to be promoted to full-time assistant coach again. At the same time, it was announced that Bakersfield Jam coach Nate Bjorkgren was Corey's replacement as player development coach (as well as being an assistant head coach in his own accord) and Mark West was relegated back into the front office as a director of player relations. Several days later, former NBA player and Austin Spurs assistant coach Earl Watson was announced as assistant coach duties. Joe Smith was also announced as a potential candidate for another player development assistant coach position. However, on June 27, 2015 — two days after the 2015 NBA draft — the Suns hired former Villanova University player and director of student-athlete development, Harlem Globetrotter, and Austin Spurs assistant coach Jason Fraser as the last player development assistant coach, being joined by fellow player development coach Irving Roland from the team's 2013–14 season.

On December 27, 2015, a day after losing to the Philadelphia 76ers (who before playing Phoenix had only one victory at that time and ended up with only 10 victories all season long), it was announced that both Earl Watson and Nate Bjorkgren were being promoted to full-time assistant coaches, while both long-time assistant coaches Jerry Sichting and Mike Longabardi were fired (although Longabardi was later hired by the Cleveland Cavaliers, eventually winning the 2016 NBA Finals six months later, while Sichting was reunite with Jeff Hornacek and Corey Gaines on the Knicks the next season). A month later, the Suns' head coach Jeff Hornacek was fired (although he'd find work again as the New York Knicks' head coach on May 18, 2016, while also being reunited with assistant coaches Jerry Sichting and Corey Gaines soon afterwards). Earl Watson became interim coach, replacing Hornacek. Former San Antonio Spurs and Seattle SuperSonics head coach Bob Hill became an assistant coach under Watson as the new head coach. After the season, the Suns designated Watson with the full-time head coach tag for the next three seasons.

=== Front office changes ===
On May 29, 2015, it was revealed that former Suns player and assistant coach Mark West was back in the front office role as a director of player relations and John Treloar was fired from his director of player personnel duties, as he decided to take on that same role for the Atlanta Hawks. Former president of basketball operations Lon Babby was relegated to be the team's senior adviser on June 10, 2015, after his initial contract as the team's president of basketball operations expired, although he still took part in the team's free agent decisions for the rest of June and July. As of August, however, that role was taken by general manager Ryan McDonough instead. On July 7, 2015, the Suns announced that the Los Angeles Clippers' Courtney Witte was the team's newest director of scouting. On July 30, 2015, Phoenix announced that the Bakersfield Jam's general manager Bubba Barrage was the new director of player personnel while keeping his role in Bakersfield, and Antonio Williams was the team's newest scout, replacing Ronnie Lester. Finally, on September 30, 2015, the team's strength and conditioning coach Mike Elliott was promoted to the director of performance.

== Roster ==
2015–16 Phoenix Suns roster
Players

| Pos. | No. | Player | Height | Weight | DOB | From |
|---|---|---|---|---|---|---|
| G | 2 | Eric Bledsoe | 6 ft 1 in (1.85 m) | 190 lb (86 kg) | 1989–12–09 | Kentucky |
| G | 1 | Devin Booker (R) | 6 ft 6 in (1.98 m) | 206 lb (93 kg) | 1996–10–30 | Kentucky |
| F | 10 | Chase Budinger | 6 ft 7 in (2.01 m) | 209 lb (95 kg) | 1988–05–22 | Arizona |
| C | 4 | Tyson Chandler | 7 ft 1 in (2.16 m) | 240 lb (109 kg) | 1982–10–02 | Dominguez HS (CA) |
| G | 20 | Archie Goodwin | 6 ft 5 in (1.96 m) | 200 lb (91 kg) | 1994–08–17 | Kentucky |
| G | 23 | John Jenkins | 6 ft 4 in (1.93 m) | 215 lb (98 kg) | 1991–03–06 | Vanderbilt |
| G | 3 | Brandon Knight | 6 ft 3 in (1.91 m) | 189 lb (86 kg) | 1991–12–02 | Kentucky |
| C | 21 | Alex Len | 7 ft 1 in (2.16 m) | 260 lb (118 kg) | 1993–06–16 | Maryland |
| F/C | 30 | Jon Leuer | 6 ft 10 in (2.08 m) | 228 lb (103 kg) | 1989–05–14 | Wisconsin |
| G | 14 | Ronnie Price | 6 ft 2 in (1.88 m) | 190 lb (86 kg) | 1983–06–21 | Utah Valley |
| F | 35 | Mirza Teletović | 6 ft 9 in (2.06 m) | 242 lb (110 kg) | 1985–09–17 | Bosnia & Herzegovina |
| G/F | 17 | P. J. Tucker | 6 ft 6 in (1.98 m) | 245 lb (111 kg) | 1985–05–05 | Texas |
| F | 12 | T. J. Warren | 6 ft 8 in (2.03 m) | 230 lb (104 kg) | 1993–09–05 | NC State |
| F/C | 15 | Alan Williams (R) | 6 ft 8 in (2.03 m) | 260 lb (118 kg) | 1993–01–28 | UC Santa Barbara |

Coaches
Head coach
- Jeff Hornacek
- Earl Watson (interim)
Assistant(s)
- Nate Bjorkgren
- Corey Gaines
- Bob Hill
- Jason Fraser (player development)
- Irving Roland (player development)

Legend
- (DP) Unsigned draft pick
- (FA) Free agent
- (S) Suspended
- (DL) On assignment to D-League affiliate
- Injured

Roster

=== Salaries ===
| Player | 2015–16 Salary |
|---|---|
| Eric Bledsoe | $13,500,000 |
| Brandon Knight | $13,500,000 |
| Tyson Chandler | $13,000,000 |
| P. J. Tucker | $5,500,000 |
| Mirza Teletović | $5,500,000 |
| Oleksiy "Alex" Len | $3,807,120 |
| Devin Booker | $2,055,840 |
| T. J. Warren | $2,041,080 |
| Ronnie Price | $1,499,187 |
| Archie Goodwin | $1,160,160 |
| Jon Leuer | $1,035,000 |
| John Jenkins | $981,349 |
| Chase Budinger | $258,082 |
| Alan Williams | $114,284 |
| Total | $63,952,102 |

For the first time since the 2009–10 season, the Suns don't have to pay Josh Childress as the amnesty clause for the NBA expires. However, they still owe Michael Beasley $777,778 due to the buyout the Suns did on September 3, 2013. Beasley's contract still affects the Suns' salary for both this season and the next. Furthermore, the Suns also bought out Kris Humphries' contract on February 28, 2016, which removed his payments of around $3,440,000 from Phoenix's books in the current season, as well as payout the rest of Sonny Weems' $2,814,000 that he didn't get earlier on (which totals out to $660,000) for the rest of the season on March 5, 2016.

== Pre-season ==
The six pre-season games the Suns played for this season tied the 1975–76 and 1981–82 seasons as the lowest number of pre-season games the Suns had in a season (excluding the lockout shortened pre-seasons of the 1998–99 and 2011–12 seasons).

2015 pre-season game log
Total: 4–2 (Home: 2–1; Road: 2–1)
Pre-season: 4–2 (home: 2–1; road: 2–1)

| Game | Date | Team | Score | High points | High rebounds | High assists | Location Attendance | Record |
|---|---|---|---|---|---|---|---|---|
| 1 | October 7 | Sacramento | W 102–98 | T. J. Warren, Jon Leuer (17) | Jon Leuer (13) | Eric Bledsoe, Ronnie Price (4) | Talking Stick Resort Arena; 12,033 | 1–0 |
| 2 | October 9 | Utah | W 101–85 | Alex Len (21) | Tyson Chandler, Sonny Weems (7) | Brandon Knight (7) | Talking Stick Resort Arena; 10,773 | 2–0 |
| 3 | October 13 | Houston | L 129–135 (OT) | T. J. Warren (21) | Mirza Teletović (12) | Markieff Morris, Sonny Weems (4) | US Airways Center; 12,657 | 2–1 |
| 4 | October 16 | @ Denver | L 81–106 | Alex Len (14) | Alex Len (8) | Sonny Weems (8) | Pepsi Center; 8,552 | 2–2 |
| 5 | October 20 | @ San Antonio | W 104–84 | Markieff Morris (17) | Eric Bledsoe, Jon Leuer (8) | Brandon Knight, T. J. Warren (7) | AT&T Center; 15,774 | 3–2 |
| 6 | October 21 | @ Dallas | W 99–87 | Markieff Morris (18) | T. J. Warren (8) | Eric Bledsoe (7) | American Airlines Center; 18,247 | 4–2 |

2015–16 season schedule

== Regular season ==
=== Season standings ===
| Pacific Division | W | L | PCT | GB | Home | Road | Div | GP |
|---|---|---|---|---|---|---|---|---|
| z – Golden State Warriors | 73 | 9 | .890 | – | 39‍–‍2 | 34‍–‍7 | 15–1 | 82 |
| x – Los Angeles Clippers | 53 | 29 | .646 | 20.0 | 29‍–‍12 | 24‍–‍17 | 9–7 | 82 |
| e – Sacramento Kings | 33 | 49 | .402 | 40.0 | 18‍–‍23 | 15‍–‍26 | 8–8 | 82 |
| e – Phoenix Suns | 23 | 59 | .280 | 50.0 | 14‍–‍27 | 9‍–‍32 | 6–10 | 82 |
| e – Los Angeles Lakers | 17 | 65 | .207 | 56.0 | 12‍–‍29 | 5‍–‍36 | 2–14 | 82 |

Western Conference
| # | Team | W | L | PCT | GB | GP |
|---|---|---|---|---|---|---|
| 1 | z – Golden State Warriors * | 73 | 9 | .890 | – | 82 |
| 2 | y – San Antonio Spurs * | 67 | 15 | .817 | 6.0 | 82 |
| 3 | y – Oklahoma City Thunder * | 55 | 27 | .671 | 18.0 | 82 |
| 4 | x – Los Angeles Clippers | 53 | 29 | .646 | 20.0 | 82 |
| 5 | x – Portland Trail Blazers | 44 | 38 | .537 | 29.0 | 82 |
| 6 | x – Dallas Mavericks | 42 | 40 | .512 | 31.0 | 82 |
| 7 | x – Memphis Grizzlies | 42 | 40 | .512 | 31.0 | 82 |
| 8 | x – Houston Rockets | 41 | 41 | .500 | 32.0 | 82 |
| 9 | e – Utah Jazz | 40 | 42 | .488 | 33.0 | 82 |
| 10 | e – Sacramento Kings | 33 | 49 | .402 | 40.0 | 82 |
| 11 | e – Denver Nuggets | 33 | 49 | .402 | 40.0 | 82 |
| 12 | e – New Orleans Pelicans | 30 | 52 | .366 | 43.0 | 82 |
| 13 | e – Minnesota Timberwolves | 29 | 53 | .354 | 44.0 | 82 |
| 14 | e – Phoenix Suns | 23 | 59 | .280 | 50.0 | 82 |
| 15 | e – Los Angeles Lakers | 17 | 65 | .207 | 56.0 | 82 |

=== Game log ===
2015–16 game log
Total: 23–59 (Home: 14–27; Road: 9–32)
October: 2–1 (home: 1–1; road: 1–0)

| Game | Date | Team | Score | High points | High rebounds | High assists | Location Attendance | Record |
|---|---|---|---|---|---|---|---|---|
| 1 | October 28 | Dallas | L 95–111 | Brandon Knight (15) | Alex Len (8) | Eric Bledsoe (4) | Talking Stick Resort Arena; 18,055 | 0–1 |
| 2 | October 30 | Portland | W 110–92 | Eric Bledsoe (22) | Tyson Chandler (12) | Brandon Knight (4) | Talking Stick Resort Arena; 18,055 | 1–1 |
| 3 | October 31 | @ Portland | W 101–90 | Eric Bledsoe (33) | Tyson Chandler (11) | Eric Bledsoe (6) | Moda Center; 17,906 | 2–1 |

November : 6–8 (home: 4–4; road: 2–4)

| Game | Date | Team | Score | High points | High rebounds | High assists | Location Attendance | Record |
|---|---|---|---|---|---|---|---|---|
| 4 | November 2 | @ L.A. Clippers | L 96–102 | Markieff Morris (19) | Tyson Chandler (17) | Brandon Knight (8) | Staples Center; 19,060 | 2–2 |
| 5 | November 4 | Sacramento | W 118–97 | Eric Bledsoe (19) | Tyson Chandler (11) | Eric Bledsoe (8) | Talking Stick Resort Arena; 16,497 | 3–2 |
| 6 | November 6 | Detroit | L 92–100 | Eric Bledsoe, Brandon Knight (22) | Tyson Chandler, P. J. Tucker (10) | Eric Bledsoe (4) | Talking Stick Resort Arena; 16,676 | 3–3 |
| 7 | November 8 | @ Oklahoma City | L 103–124 | Eric Bledsoe (28) | Tyson Chandler (8) | Eric Bledsoe (11) | Chesapeake Energy Arena; 18,203 | 3–4 |
| 8 | November 12 | L.A. Clippers | W 118–104 | Brandon Knight (37) | Jon Leuer (11) | Eric Bledsoe (9) | Talking Stick Resort Arena; 17,204 | 4–4 |
| 9 | November 14 | Denver | W 105–81 | Eric Bledsoe (30) | Mirza Teletović (9) | Eric Bledsoe, P. J. Tucker (4) | Talking Stick Resort Arena; 16,722 | 5–4 |
| 10 | November 16 | L.A. Lakers | W 120–101 | Brandon Knight (30) | Brandon Knight (10) | Brandon Knight (15) | Talking Stick Resort Arena; 18,055 | 6–4 |
| 11 | November 18 | Chicago | L 97–103 | Brandon Knight (23) | Tyson Chandler (9) | Eric Bledsoe (7) | Talking Stick Resort Arena; 17,377 | 6–5 |
| 12 | November 20 | @ Denver | W 114–107 | Brandon Knight (38) | Brandon Knight (11) | Brandon Knight (6) | Pepsi Center; 12,264 | 7–5 |
| 13 | November 22 | @ New Orleans | L 116–122 | Eric Bledsoe (29) | Tyson Chandler (10) | Brandon Knight (7) | Smoothie King Center; 16,680 | 7–6 |
| 14 | November 23 | @ San Antonio | L 84–98 | Markieff Morris (28) | Markieff Morris (8) | Brandon Knight (8) | AT&T Center; 18,418 | 7–7 |
| 15 | November 25 | New Orleans | L 114–120 | Brandon Knight (29) | Jon Leuer (12) | Brandon Knight (10) | Talking Stick Resort Arena; 16,338 | 7–8 |
| 16 | November 27 | Golden State | L 116–135 | T. J. Warren (28) | T. J. Warren (6) | Eric Bledsoe (7) | Talking Stick Resort Arena; 18,055 | 7–9 |
| 17 | November 29 | @ Toronto | W 107–102 | Eric Bledsoe, Mirza Teletović (20) | T. J. Warren (11) | Eric Bledsoe (11) | Air Canada Centre; 19,800 | 8–9 |

December : 4–14 (home: 3–5; road: 1–9)

| Game | Date | Team | Score | High points | High rebounds | High assists | Location Attendance | Record |
|---|---|---|---|---|---|---|---|---|
| 18 | December 1 | @ Brooklyn | L 91–94 | Brandon Knight (26) | Alex Len (14) | Eric Bledsoe (7) | Barclays Center; 12,787 | 8–10 |
| 19 | December 2 | @ Detroit | L 122–127 (OT) | Brandon Knight (22) | Alex Len (7) | Eric Bledsoe (9) | The Palace of Auburn Hills; 13,985 | 8–11 |
| 20 | December 4 | @ Washington | L 106–109 | Eric Bledsoe (22) | P. J. Tucker (13) | Eric Bledsoe (7) | Verizon Center; 17,255 | 8–12 |
| 21 | December 6 | @ Memphis | L 93–95 | Eric Bledsoe (23) | Jon Leuer (11) | Eric Bledsoe (6) | FedExForum; 16,022 | 8–13 |
| 22 | December 7 | @ Chicago | W 103–101 | Brandon Knight (21) | Eric Bledsoe (9) | Devin Booker (5) | United Center; 21,337 | 9–13 |
| 23 | December 9 | Orlando | W 107–104 | Eric Bledsoe, Brandon Knight (21) | Alex Len (14) | Eric Bledsoe (9) | Talking Stick Resort Arena; 17,637 | 10–13 |
| 24 | December 11 | Portland | L 96–106 | Eric Bledsoe (31) | Alex Len, Jon Leuer (8) | Brandon Knight (10) | Talking Stick Resort Arena; 17,028 | 10–14 |
| 25 | December 13 | Minnesota | W 108–101 | Brandon Knight (25) | Alex Len, P. J. Tucker (7) | Eric Bledsoe (9) | Talking Stick Resort Arena; 16,919 | 11–14 |
| 26 | December 14 | @ Dallas | L 94–104 | Eric Bledsoe (23) | Jon Leuer (13) | Eric Bledsoe (7) | American Airlines Center; 19,822 | 11–15 |
| 27 | December 16 | @ Golden State | L 103–128 | Mirza Teletović (24) | T. J. Warren (8) | Eric Bledsoe (8) | Oracle Arena; 19,596 | 11–16 |
| 28 | December 18 | New Orleans | W 104–88 | Eric Bledsoe (29) | Alex Len (13) | Eric Bledsoe (9) | Talking Stick Resort Arena; 17,227 | 12–16 |
| 29 | December 20 | Milwaukee | L 95–101 | Eric Bledsoe, T. J. Warren (18) | Tyson Chandler, Alex Len (7) | Brandon Knight, Markieff Morris (4) | Talking Stick Resort Arena; 16,859 | 12–17 |
| 30 | December 21 | @ Utah | L 89–110 | Brandon Knight (26) | Mirza Teletović (7) | Eric Bledsoe (3) | Vivint Smart Home Arena; 19,911 | 12–18 |
| 31 | December 23 | Denver | L 96–104 | Brandon Knight (21) | P. J. Tucker (13) | Brandon Knight (10) | Talking Stick Resort Arena; 17,034 | 12–19 |
| 32 | December 26 | Philadelphia | L 104–111 | Brandon Knight (21) | Tyson Chandler (10) | Brandon Knight (7) | Talking Stick Resort Arena; 17,548 | 12–20 |
| 33 | December 28 | Cleveland | L 97–101 | T. J. Warren (23) | Tyson Chandler (8) | Brandon Knight, Jon Leuer (4) | Talking Stick Resort Arena; 18,319 | 12–21 |
| 34 | December 30 | @ San Antonio | L 79–112 | Tyson Chandler, Brandon Knight, T. J. Warren (11) | Tyson Chandler (10) | Markieff Morris (5) | AT&T Center; 18,418 | 12–22 |
| 35 | December 31 | @ Oklahoma City | L 106–110 | P. J. Tucker (22) | Tyson Chandler (10) | Brandon Knight (6) | Chesapeake Energy Arena; 18,203 | 12–23 |

January : 2–12 (home: 2–4; road: 0–8)

| Game | Date | Team | Score | High points | High rebounds | High assists | Location Attendance | Record |
|---|---|---|---|---|---|---|---|---|
| 36 | January 2 | @ Sacramento | L 119–142 | Brandon Knight (23) | Brandon Knight, T. J. Warren (5) | Brandon Knight, Ronnie Price (5) | Sleep Train Arena; 17,317 | 12–24 |
| 37 | January 3 | @ L.A. Lakers | L 77–97 | Brandon Knight (25) | Alex Len (9) | Brandon Knight (9) | Staples Center; 18,997 | 12–25 |
| 38 | January 6 | Charlotte | W 111–102 | Mirza Teletović (19) | Devin Booker (10) | Brandon Knight (7) | Talking Stick Resort Arena; 16,910 | 13–25 |
| 39 | January 8 | Miami | L 95–103 | Brandon Knight (26) | P. J. Tucker (11) | Brandon Knight, Archie Goodwin (4) | Talking Stick Resort Arena; 16,866 | 13–26 |
| 40 | January 12 | @ Indiana | L 97–116 | Devin Booker, Mirza Teletović (19) | P. J. Tucker (10) | P. J. Tucker, Lorenzo Brown (5) | Bankers Life Fieldhouse; 15,284 | 13–27 |
| 41 | January 15 | @ Boston | L 103–117 | Mirza Teletović (22) | Tyson Chandler, Markieff Morris (9) | Sonny Weems (5) | TD Garden; 18,624 | 13–28 |
| 42 | January 17 | @ Minnesota | L 87–117 | Brandon Knight (20) | Tyson Chandler (8) | P. J. Tucker (5) | Target Center; 14,330 | 13–29 |
| 43 | January 19 | Indiana | L 94–97 | Devin Booker (32) | Tyson Chandler (14) | P. J. Tucker (5) | Talking Stick Resort Arena; 16,802 | 13–30 |
| 44 | January 21 | San Antonio | L 89–117 | Devin Booker (24) | Tyson Chandler (20) | Devin Booker (5) | Talking Stick Resort Arena; 16,779 | 13–31 |
| 45 | January 23 | Atlanta | W 98–95 | Archie Goodwin (24) | Tyson Chandler (27) | Tyson Chandler, Alex Len (5) | Talking Stick Resort Arena; 17,034 | 14–31 |
| 46 | January 26 | @ Philadelphia | L 103–113 | Archie Goodwin (26) | Alex Len (12) | Devin Booker (7) | Wells Fargo Center; 10,851 | 14–32 |
| 47 | January 27 | @ Cleveland | L 93–115 | Devin Booker (16) | Tyson Chandler, P. J. Tucker (7) | Devin Booker, Archie Goodwin (5) | Quicken Loans Arena; 20,562 | 14–33 |
| 48 | January 29 | @ New York | L 84–102 | Devin Booker (21) | Tyson Chandler (12) | P. J. Tucker, Jordan McRae (4) | Madison Square Garden; 19,812 | 14–34 |
| 49 | January 31 | @ Dallas | L 78–91 | Devin Booker (19) | Tyson Chandler (13) | Archie Goodwin, Markieff Morris (4) | American Airlines Center; 20,137 | 14–35 |

February : 1–9 (home: 1–8; road: 0–1)

| Game | Date | Team | Score | High points | High rebounds | High assists | Location Attendance | Record |
|---|---|---|---|---|---|---|---|---|
| 50 | February 2 | Toronto | L 97–104 | Markieff Morris (30) | Markieff Morris (11) | Archie Goodwin (12) | Talking Stick Resort Arena; 15,897 | 14–36 |
| 51 | February 4 | Houston | L 105–111 | Archie Goodwin (22) | Alex Len (18) | Archie Goodwin (7) | Talking Stick Resort Arena; 15,723 | 14–37 |
| 52 | February 6 | Utah | L 89–98 | Devin Booker (18) | Tyson Chandler (14) | Markieff Morris (8) | Talking Stick Resort Arena; 16,180 | 14–38 |
| 53 | February 8 | Oklahoma City | L 106–122 | Markieff Morris (23) | Alex Len (8) | Archie Goodwin (8) | Talking Stick Resort Arena; 16,316 | 14–39 |
| 54 | February 10 | Golden State | L 104–112 | Archie Goodwin (25) | Tyson Chandler (10) | Devin Booker (10) | Talking Stick Resort Arena; 18,055 | 14–40 |
All-Star Break
| 55 | February 19 | Houston | L 100–116 | Mirza Teletović (25) | Kris Humphries (12) | Archie Goodwin (4) | Talking Stick Resort Arena; 17,102 | 14–41 |
| 56 | February 21 | San Antonio | L 111–118 | Alex Len (23) | Alex Len (13) | Devin Booker (6) | Talking Stick Resort Arena; 16,224 | 14–42 |
| 57 | February 22 | @ L.A. Clippers | L 84–124 | Archie Goodwin (20) | Alex Len (8) | Phil Pressey (10) | Staples Center; 19,060 | 14–43 |
| 58 | February 25 | Brooklyn | L 106–116 | Mirza Teletović (30) | Tyson Chandler, Mirza Teletović (11) | Phil Pressey (4) | Talking Stick Resort Arena; 16,145 | 14–44 |
| 59 | February 27 | Memphis | W 111–106 | Alex Len (22) | Alex Len (16) | P. J. Tucker (7) | Talking Stick Resort Arena; 17,101 | 15–44 |

March : 5–11 (home: 2–3; road: 3–8)

| Game | Date | Team | Score | High points | High rebounds | High assists | Location Attendance | Record |
|---|---|---|---|---|---|---|---|---|
| 60 | March 1 | @ Charlotte | L 92–126 | Alex Len (18) | Alex Len (12) | Phil Pressey, Ronnie Price (3) | Time Warner Cable Arena; 16,849 | 15–45 |
| 61 | March 3 | @ Miami | L 92–108 | Devin Booker (34) | Alex Len (13) | Devin Booker (4) | American Airlines Arena; 19,600 | 15–46 |
| 62 | March 4 | @ Orlando | W 102–84 | Alex Len (31) | Alex Len (15) | Devin Booker (6) | Amway Center; 17,546 | 16–46 |
| 63 | March 6 | @ Memphis | W 109–100 | Devin Booker (27) | Alex Len (16) | Devin Booker (9) | FedExForum; 17,291 | 17–46 |
| 64 | March 9 | New York | L 97–128 | Devin Booker (32) | Alex Len (10) | Ronnie Price (6) | Talking Stick Resort Arena; 17,105 | 17–47 |
| 65 | March 10 | @ Denver | L 98–116 | Devin Booker (35) | Alex Len (13) | Brandon Knight, Devin Booker, Ronnie Price (5) | Pepsi Center; 11,582 | 17–48 |
| 66 | March 12 | @ Golden State | L 116–123 | Brandon Knight (30) | Alex Len (13) | Devin Booker (11) | Oracle Arena; 19,596 | 17–49 |
| 67 | March 14 | Minnesota | W 107–104 | P. J. Tucker (23) | P. J. Tucker (12) | Brandon Knight (7) | Talking Stick Resort Arena; 17,480 | 18–49 |
| 68 | March 17 | @ Utah | L 69–103 | Brandon Knight (17) | Alex Len (12) | Devin Booker (3) | Vivint Smart Home Arena; 18,784 | 18–50 |
| 69 | March 18 | @ L.A. Lakers | W 95–90 | Brandon Knight (22) | Tyson Chandler (17) | Devin Booker (7) | Staples Center; 18,997 | 19–50 |
| 70 | March 21 | Memphis | L 97–103 | Devin Booker (18) | Jon Leuer (13) | Brandon Knight (7) | Talking Stick Resort Arena; 15,868 | 19–51 |
| 71 | March 23 | L.A. Lakers | W 119–107 | Devin Booker (28) | Jon Leuer (14) | Brandon Knight, Devin Booker (7) | Talking Stick Resort Arena; 18,191 | 20–51 |
| 72 | March 25 | @ Sacramento | L 94–116 | Devin Booker (26) | P. J. Tucker, John Jenkins (8) | Ronnie Price (5) | Sleep Train Arena; 17,317 | 20–52 |
| 73 | March 26 | Boston | L 99–102 | Devin Booker (21) | P. J. Tucker (10) | P. J. Tucker (5) | Talking Stick Resort Arena; 18,055 | 20–53 |
| 74 | March 28 | @ Minnesota | L 116–121 | Brandon Knight, Devin Booker (30) | Alex Len (13) | Brandon Knight, Devin Booker (5) | Target Center; 11,141 | 20–54 |
| 75 | March 30 | @ Milwaukee | L 94–105 | P. J. Tucker (20) | Alex Len (15) | P. J. Tucker (7) | BMO Harris Bradley Center; 15,733 | 20–55 |

April : 3–4 (home: 1–3; road: 2–1)

| Game | Date | Team | Score | High points | High rebounds | High assists | Location Attendance | Record |
|---|---|---|---|---|---|---|---|---|
| 76 | April 1 | Washington | L 99–106 | Mirza Teletović (24) | Tyson Chandler (14) | Ronnie Price (8) | Talking Stick Resort Arena; 17,345 | 20–56 |
| 77 | April 3 | Utah | L 86–101 | Mirza Teletović (24) | Tyson Chandler (18) | Devin Booker (7) | Talking Stick Resort Arena; 17,279 | 20–57 |
| 78 | April 5 | @ Atlanta | L 90–103 | Devin Booker (34) | Tyson Chandler (13) | Ronnie Price (4) | Philips Arena; 15,176 | 20–58 |
| 79 | April 7 | @ Houston | W 124–115 | Mirza Teletović (26) | P. J. Tucker (12) | Alex Len (7) | Toyota Center; 18,227 | 21–58 |
| 80 | April 9 | @ New Orleans | W 121–100 | Archie Goodwin (24) | Alex Len (11) | Devin Booker (5) | Smoothie King Center; 16,932 | 22–58 |
| 81 | April 11 | Sacramento | L 101–105 | Mirza Teletović (26) | Alex Len (12) | Ronnie Price (7) | Talking Stick Resort Arena; 17,288 | 22–59 |
| 82 | April 13 | L.A. Clippers | W 114–105 | Mirza Teletović (22) | Jon Leuer (14) | Archie Goodwin (5) | Talking Stick Resort Arena; 18,055 | 23–59 |

2015–16 season schedule

== Player statistics ==
Legend
| GP | Games played | GS | Games started | MPG | Minutes per game |
| FG% | Field-goal percentage | 3P% | 3-point field-goal percentage | FT% | Free-throw percentage |
| RPG | Rebounds per game | APG | Assists per game | SPG | Steals per game |
| BPG | Blocks per game | PPG | Points per game |

| Player | GP | GS | MPG | FG% | 3P% | FT% | RPG | APG | SPG | BPG | PPG |
|---|---|---|---|---|---|---|---|---|---|---|---|
| Eric Bledsoe | 31 | 31 | 34.2 | .453 | .372 | .802 | 4.0 | 6.1 | 2.0 | 0.6 | 20.4 |
| Devin Booker | 76 | 51 | 27.7 | .423 | .343 | .840 | 2.5 | 2.6 | 0.6 | 0.3 | 13.8 |
| Lorenzo Brown* | 8 | 0 | 7.6 | .320 | .125 | .750 | 0.9 | 1.4 | 0.4 | 0.1 | 2.5 |
| Chase Budinger* | 17 | 0 | 11.8 | .511 | .235 | .625 | 1.7 | 0.9 | 0.2 | 0.1 | 3.2 |
| Tyson Chandler | 66 | 60 | 24.5 | .583 | .000 | .620 | 8.7 | 1.0 | 0.5 | 0.7 | 7.2 |
| Bryce Cotton* | 3 | 0 | 11.0 | .250 | .000 | .000 | 0.0 | 1.0 | 1.0 | 0.0 | 1.3 |
| Archie Goodwin | 57 | 13 | 19.5 | .418 | .232 | .674 | 2.5 | 2.1 | 0.5 | 0.2 | 8.9 |
| Kris Humphries* | 4 | 3 | 18.5 | .278 | .300 | .750 | 8.0 | 1.8 | 0.8 | 0.5 | 7.3 |
| Cory Jefferson* | 8 | 0 | 6.3 | .409 | .000 | .667 | 2.0 | 0.0 | 0.0 | 0.1 | 2.8 |
| John Jenkins* | 22 | 2 | 13.0 | .467 | .406 | .800 | 1.6 | 1.2 | 0.2 | 0.0 | 5.0 |
| Orlando Johnson* | 2 | 0 | 23.5 | .278 | .200 | .833 | 4.5 | 0.0 | 1.0 | 1.5 | 8.0 |
| Brandon Knight | 52 | 50 | 36.0 | .415 | .342 | .852 | 3.9 | 5.1 | 1.2 | 0.4 | 19.6 |
| Oleksiy "Alex" Len | 78 | 46 | 23.3 | .423 | .143 | .728 | 7.6 | 1.2 | 0.5 | 0.8 | 9.0 |
| Jon Leuer | 67 | 27 | 18.7 | .481 | .382 | .762 | 5.6 | 1.1 | 0.6 | 0.4 | 8.5 |
| Jordan McRae* | 7 | 0 | 11.7 | .423 | .273 | .533 | 1.1 | 1.4 | 0.4 | 0.0 | 5.3 |
| Markieff Morris* | 37 | 24 | 24.8 | .397 | .289 | .717 | 5.2 | 2.4 | 0.9 | 0.5 | 11.6 |
| Phil Pressey* | 9 | 0 | 12.6 | .391 | .000 | .571 | 0.9 | 3.2 | 0.8 | 0.3 | 2.4 |
| Ronnie Price | 62 | 18 | 19.5 | .384 | .347 | .756 | 1.6 | 2.4 | 1.2 | 0.2 | 5.3 |
| Mirza Teletović | 79 | 1 | 21.3 | .427 | .393 | .774 | 3.8 | 1.1 | 0.4 | 0.3 | 12.2 |
| P. J. Tucker | 82 | 80 | 31.0 | .411 | .330 | .746 | 6.2 | 2.2 | 1.3 | 0.2 | 8.0 |
| T. J. Warren | 47 | 4 | 22.8 | .501 | .400 | .703 | 3.1 | 0.9 | 0.8 | 0.3 | 11.0 |
| Sonny Weems* | 36 | 0 | 11.7 | .393 | .406 | .538 | 1.1 | 1.3 | 0.3 | 0.0 | 2.5 |
| Alan Williams | 10 | 0 | 6.8 | .417 | .000 | .643 | 3.8 | 0.5 | 0.4 | 0.5 | 2.9 |

- Stats with the Suns

== Injuries/Personal missed games ==
| Player | Duration | | Reason for Missed Time | Games Missed |
| Player | Start | End | Reason for Missed Time | Games Missed |
|---|---|---|---|---|
| Devin Booker | November 1, 2015 | November 4, 2015 | Tweaked ankle during practice | 1 |
| Markieff Morris | November 13, 2015 | November 18, 2015 | Sprained left knee during the first quarter against the L.A. Clippers | 2 |
| Ronnie Price | November 13, 2015 | November 18, 2015 | Had concussion during the first quarter against the L.A. Clippers | 2 |
| T. J. Warren | November 18, 2015 | November 20, 2015 | Illness | 1 |
| Eric Bledsoe | November 23, 2015 | November 25, 2015 | Hurt leg after the road New Orleans Pelicans game | 1 |
| Tyson Chandler | November 25, 2015 | November 27, 2015 | Illness | 1 |
| Tyson Chandler | November 29, 2015 | December 13, 2015 | Hurt right hamstring during the first quarter against Golden State | 8 |
| Markieff Morris | December 2, 2015 | December 4, 2015 | Hurt left knee after the road Brooklyn Nets game | 1 |
| Markieff Morris | December 9, 2015 | December 18, 2015 | Had a sinus infection after their six-game road trip ended | 5 |
| Markieff Morris | December 26, 2015 | December 30, 2015 | Suspended after throwing a towel at coach Jeff Hornacek | 2 |
| Eric Bledsoe | December 28, 2015 | The Rest of the Season | Tore his left meniscus during the home Philadelphia 76ers game | 48 |
| Ronnie Price | December 30, 2015 | January 2, 2016 | Hurt his toe during the home Cleveland Cavaliers game | 2 |
| Jon Leuer | December 31, 2015 | January 2, 2016 | Injured his leg during the road San Antonio Spurs game | 1 |
| Brandon Knight | January 12, 2016 | January 15, 2016 | Had food poisoning before the road Indiana Pacers game | 1 |
| Olexsiy "Alex" Len | January 12, 2016 | January 19, 2016 | Injured left hand continued bothering him | 3 |
| Ronnie Price | January 12, 2016 | February 19, 2016 | Stubbed his great right toe before the road Indiana game | 15 |
| Jon Leuer | January 19, 2016 | January 29, 2016 | Had lower back spasms before the home Indiana Pacers game | 5 |
| Markieff Morris | January 21, 2016 | January 26, 2016 | Had a right shoulder strain during the first quarter of that same home Indiana game | 2 |
| Mirza Teletović | January 21, 2016 | January 23, 2016 | Had a left ankle sprain during the third quarter during that same home Indiana game | 1 |
| Brandon Knight | January 21, 2016 | March 10, 2016 | Had a left adductor strain before the first home game against the San Antonio Spurs began | 21 |
| T. J. Warren | January 31, 2016 | The Rest of the Season | Injured the middle part of his right foot on the road against Cleveland | 34 |
| Oleksiy "Alex" Len | February 19, 2016 | February 21, 2016 | Had a right ankle sprain before the second home game against Houston | 1 |
| Tyson Chandler | February 21, 2016 | February 25, 2016 | Had a right shoulder contusion in the second quarter against Houston | 2 |
| Tyson Chandler | March 23, 2016 | March 28, 2016 | Had back spasms during the second quarter at home against Memphis | 3 |
| Brandon Knight | March 25, 2016 | March 26, 2016 | Had a stomach ache before the road game against Sacramento | 1 |
| Jon Leuer | March 26, 2016 | March 28, 2016 | Had a stomach ache before the home game against Boston | 1 |
| Mirza Teletović | March 30, 2016 | April 1, 2016 | Had an upset stomach before the road game against Milwaukee | 1 |
| Brandon Knight | April 1, 2016 | The Rest of the Season | Aggravated a sports hernia during the same road game against Milwaukee | 7 |
| Jon Leuer | April 1, 2016 | April 7, 2016 | Had a right ankle strain before the home game against Washington | 3 |
| Archie Goodwin | April 11, 2016 | April 13, 2016 | Sprained his left ankle during the second New Orleans road game | 1 |
| Tyson Chandler | April 11, 2016 | The Rest of the Season | Under a concussion protocol during the third quarter against New Orleans | 2 |

== Awards, records, and milestones ==
"What strikes a lot of people about Devin is all the other stuff he can do – he's really developed his ball handling, his pick and roll game, he thinks the game at a high level. But I'll be honest, we had no idea he'd be able to do this much, this quickly. Devin has done unbelievably well not just on the court but representing the franchise in the community as well. He was a bright spot for us in a difficult year."

— Ryan McDonough, Suns GM

=== Awards ===
- T. J. Warren earned All-NBA First Team Las Vegas Summer League Honors due to his overall performance throughout the 2015 NBA Summer League.
- Two-time MVP point guard Steve Nash had his number placed in the Phoenix Suns Ring of Honor on October 30, 2015, against the Portland Trail Blazers. The Suns won that game by the score of 110–92, thus blowing out the Trail Blazers in the process.
- Former Suns player Shaquille O'Neal was named to the Naismith Memorial Basketball Hall of Fame on April 4, 2016, around the 2016 NCAA Finals between Villanova and North Carolina.
- Devin Booker earned himself NBA All-Rookie First Team honors as the considered third-best player for that team after also earning fourth place for NBA Rookie of the Year Award honors.

==== Week/Month ====
- Alex Len was named a Player of The Week candidate for the Western Conference from February 29 – March 6, 2016 for averaging 20 points, 14 rebounds, 1.3 blocks, and 10 free throw attempts per game during that streak.
- Devin Booker was named the runner-up for the Rookie of The Month award in March for his consistent performances throughout that month, which includes him leading all rookies in points and assists made that month.

==== All-Star ====
- Jordan McRae was announced as a competitor in the NBA Development League All-Star Game on the same day he signed a 10-day contract with the team (January 29, 2016).
  - Likewise, both former Suns player Lorenzo Brown and future Suns player Orlando Johnson (he signed on February 5, 2016) were also announced as competitors on that same day.
  - Jordan McRae scored 7 points and put up 5 assists as his team (the Eastern Conference) beat the Western Conference 128–124. Neither former player Lorenzo Brown nor Jordan's then-current teammate, Orlando Johnson, played in the event.
- Rookie Devin Booker was a competitor for the Three-Point Shootout on February 1, 2016. That made Booker the youngest player to ever participate in the Three-Point Contest, at 19 years old, beating the record set by Bradley Beal at 20 years old in 2014.
  - In Booker's first ever performance in the contest, he scored 20 points in the first round (tying for third-place), beating James Harden and JJ Redick with 12 points in the tiebreaker round before finishing in third place overall with 16 points behind the Splash Brothers (with Klay Thompson winning by 27 points, tying the record set by his teammate Stephen Curry a year earlier).
- Devin Booker was announced as a participant for the NBA Cares Special Olympics Unified Basketball Game for the 2016 All-Star game alongside former Suns player Steve Nash on February 10, 2016.
- Rookie Devin Booker competed in the Rising Stars Challenge on February 11, 2016 (a day before the event began) due to Philadelphia 76ers power forward/center Nerlens Noel injuring his right knee before the event began.
  - During his time there, Booker scored 23 points for Team U.S.A. (with 18 in the first half) as the road Team U.S.A. would be the home World Team 157–154, with the home and road team roles being reversed this time due to the All-Star Game being played in Canada this season.
- Jon Leuer was a competitor for the All-Star Game's Talent Competition. He did not win the event.

=== Records ===
- Brandon Knight became the youngest player to record a stat line of 30 points, 15 assists, 10 rebounds, and 4 steals in a single NBA game on November 16, 2015, against the Los Angeles Lakers by doing it while he was 23 years, 349 days old. Knight also became the second Suns player to record a triple-double of 30 points, 15 assists, and 10 rebounds (the first was former All-Star Charlie Scott), as well as the ninth player to record such statistics and only the fourth player (behind Pete Maravich, Magic Johnson, and Russell Westbrook) to record the same stats with four steals. Furthermore, Knight was also the first player since Michael Jordan in 1985 to record a statline similar to the 30 points, 15 assists, and 10 rebounds that Knight had for their first ever triple-double in the league.
- Devin Booker became the youngest guard in NBA history to record a double-double in points and rebounds instead of through points and assists with the 17 points and 10 rebounds he recorded on January 6, 2016, against the Charlotte Hornets.
  - He also became the youngest player in NBA history to record 10 rebounds as a reserve player off the bench.
- Rookie Devin Booker also became the youngest guard ever to have four games of at least 27 points and 5 assists, as well as the only guard throughout the entire NBA to record such numbers before turning 20 years old.
- Mirza Teletović recorded the highest number of three-pointers made by a reserve player on April 5, 2016, against the Atlanta Hawks. Mirza tied the record by the end of the first quarter on that game, and broke the record set by Chuck Person for the San Antonio Spurs during the 1994–95 season in the second quarter with 8:42 left to go.
  - He ended the season with a record-high 179 three-pointers made off the bench, making thirteen more three-pointers in the last four games of April, three of which were victories.
    - The record was later broken next season by Eric Gordon as a member of the Houston Rockets.

=== Team records ===
- Devin Booker was the team's youngest ever selection (at the time) in the NBA draft, being 18 years, 238 days old at the time of his selection on June 25, 2015. Booker also ended up being one of the youngest players to ever play in the NBA by remaining 18 years old due to him playing two days before his 19th birthday, in which the earliest time he could play in the regular season (and the only time before his 19th birthday took place) was the October 28, 2015 home game against the Dallas Mavericks. He became the second Suns player to play before his 18th birthday while debuting with the team (the Polish/Swedish forward-center Maciej Lampe made his debut with the Suns 13 days before his birthday during the 2003–04 season despite originally being drafted by the New York Knicks in the second round around that time).
- The 142 points the Sacramento Kings scored on January 2, 2016, was the highest against Phoenix without the help of an overtime since the 1990–91 NBA season.
- The 22 points scored in the first half of the road game against the Los Angeles Lakers on January 3, 2016, was the franchise's lowest-scoring half ever, beating out the 24 point half set a year earlier at home against the San Antonio Spurs.
- Devin Booker became the youngest Suns player in history to record his first ever double-double with the team by producing 17 points and 10 rebounds in a 111–102 victory over the Charlotte Hornets on January 6, 2016.
- Lorenzo Brown scored 7 points in his debut with the Suns on January 12, 2016, against the Indiana Pacers. It made him the highest scoring player on the team during a first game on a 10-day contract.
  - Jordan McRae broke that record on January 29, 2016, against the New York Knicks by scoring 12 points off the bench.
- Devin Booker became the youngest Suns player to record 30 or more points by scoring 32 points in a close loss to the Indiana Pacers on January 19, 2016, beating out fan favorite Amar'e Stoudemire at 20 years old (albeit with 38 points). Booker also had the highest number of three-pointers made in a single game for the Suns with six.
- Tyson Chandler tied the team record for most rebounds recorded in a single game (27) that was initially set by Paul Silas on January 18, 1971 against the Cleveland Cavaliers, and broke the Suns' record for most offensive rebounds by a single player with 13 (the previous best high was 12 with both Charles Barkley and Curtis Perry) in a close 98–95 victory over the Atlanta Hawks> He also became the first Suns player to record consecutive 20+ rebounding games (he'd also record 20 rebounds in a loss to the San Antonio Spurs on January 21, 2016).
- Archie Goodwin broke the record set by star point guard Kevin Johnson in the 1987–88 season as the youngest player in Suns history to record a double-double in points and assists by scoring 18 points and putting up 12 assists on February 2, 2016, against the Toronto Raptors.
  - Rookie Devin Booker broke that record over a week later on February 10, 2016, with 15 points and 10 assists (as well as 7 rebounds) in a close loss to the defending champion Golden State Warriors. He also became the youngest Suns player to record multiple double-doubles during the regular season, beating out Amar'e Stoudemire in his rookie season. Furthermore, Booker became the second-youngest player behind LeBron James to record a point-assist double-double (beating the Golden State Warriors' Shaun Livingston) and becoming only the third player to record similar statistics at age 19 behind only James and former Suns player Stephon Marbury, as well as the first Suns rookie since Steve Nash in the 1996–97 season to record a point-assist double-double with the team.
- Phil Pressey became the shortest player in franchise history to record 3 or more blocks in a single game, as well as the most blocks by a point guard in his debut on February 21, 2016, against the San Antonio Spurs.
- Alex Len became the first player at 22 years old to ever record a game of 19 points, 16 rebounds, and 6 assists for the Suns in the 109–100 victory on March 6, 2016, against the Memphis Grizzlies.
- The 69 points the Suns recorded against the Utah Jazz on St. Patrick's Day of 2016 tied the lowest number of points scored in a single game for the Suns, with them also recording 69 points on April 7, 2015, against the Atlanta Hawks and on February 10, 2013, against the Oklahoma City Thunder.
- Mirza Teletović becomes the newest team record holder for three-pointers made off the bench for the Suns by him making at least 151 three-pointers (done by making 5 of them in a victory on Kobe Bryant's last game against the Suns on March 23, 2016) over the 150 three-pointers made by Danny Ainge during the 1992–93 season.
  - By extension, he later broke the NBA record set by former San Antonio Spurs player Chuck Person during the 1994–95 season by making at least 165 three-pointers (with three made in a loss to the Atlanta Hawks on April 5, 2016) throughout the season.
    - Mirza ended the season with a season-high 179 three-pointers made off the bench.
- Devin Booker had the longest streak of making at least one three-pointer in a stretch of 14 games, which was also the longest stretch by a rookie in Suns Franchise history.

=== Milestones ===
- Devin Booker became the first ever player to make his NBA debut at 18 years old while also previously playing at least one year in college.
  - He also became the seventh-youngest player to score 10 or more points in his rookie season, behind only Amir Johnson, Andrew Bynum, Tracy McGrady, Bill Willoughby, LeBron James, Dwight Howard, and Kobe Bryant by scoring 14 points on his opening night debut against the Dallas Mavericks. Furthermore, he also became the fourth player to score 10 or more points during their professional debuts in the NBA as an 18-year-old, joining the likes of Jonathan Bender, LeBron James, and Dwight Howard in the process.
- Devin Booker became the sixth-youngest player to record multiple games of 19 or more points scored during their rookie season after first scoring 19 against the Philadelphia 76ers on December 26, 2015, and then scoring 21 points against the Sacramento Kings on January 2, 2016, behind only Kevin Durant, Dwight Howard, LeBron James, Tracy McGrady, and Kobe Bryant.
- Jeff Hornacek got his 100th victory as a head coach on January 6, 2016, against the Charlotte Hornets.
- Ann Meyers Drysdale and Stephanie Ready marked the first time in NBA history that two female announcers from different teams were analysts for their respective teams (Ann for Phoenix, Stephanie for Charlotte) on January 6, 2016.
- In that same game, Devin Booker became the fifth-youngest player to record a double-double in the NBA, behind only Michael Kidd-Gilchrist, Giannis Antetokounmpo, Andrew Bynum, and LeBron James.
- On January 19, 2016, Devin Booker became the sixth-youngest player to record multiple games of scoring 20 or more points as a rookie, and became the third-youngest player in league history to score over 30 points in a single game, behind only Kevin Durant and LeBron James.
- On January 19 & 21, 2016, Devin Booker became the first teenage rookie since Kevin Durant back in the 2007–08 season (back when Kevin was playing for the Seattle SuperSonics instead of the Oklahoma City Thunder) to score 54 or more points in consecutive games with Devin scoring 32 points against the Indiana Pacers and 24 points against the San Antonio Spurs.
- On February 21, 2016, new Suns point guard Phil Pressey recorded three blocked shots in his first game with Phoenix against the San Antonio Spurs. Pressey was the first player less than 6' tall to record at least three blocks in a single game since Nate Robinson in 2013.
- Rookie Devin Booker became only the second player this season, after former Kentucky teammate Karl-Anthony Towns to record multiple games of 32+ points in his rookie season, with 32 points at home against the Indiana Pacers in January and 34 points on the road against the Miami Heat in March. He was also the fourth-youngest rookie to record multiple games of 30 or more points in a season, after Kobe Bryant, Kevin Durant, and LeBron James.
- Tyson Chandler overtook Elton Brand on the List of National Basketball Association career rebounding leaders board with 12 rebounds against the Orlando Magic compared to Brand's four against the Miami Heat on March 4, 2016, to make him the newest 50th best rebounder of all-time with 8,986 rebounds against the 8,981 rebounds for Brand (and he also overtook Larry Bird's spot in the process).
- Tyson Chandler became the 50th player in league history to record over 9,000 rebounds in a career by recording 9 rebounds on March 9, 2016, against the New York Knicks.
- Devin Booker became the fourth rookie to record at least 3 games of recording 27 points and 5 assists as a teenager, thus joining LeBron James, Carmelo Anthony, and former Suns player Stephon Marbury.
  - He later became only the second player in league history (after LeBron James with 22 games) to record at least four or more games of 27 points and 5 assists as teenagers during their rookie seasons in the NBA.
  - He also became only the second guard behind Stephon Marbury to record multiple games of 30 points and 5 assists during their rookie season before the age of 20, and one of seven guards to record at least one game of 30 points and 5 assists before the age of 21.
- Rookie Devin Booker became the second rookie ever (after LeBron James) to record two straight 30+ games in a row by recording 32 points against the New York Knicks and a new career-high 35 points against the Denver Nuggets on March 9 & 10, 2016. He's also the second-youngest rookie to have done it for two straight days in a row.
- Devin Booker became the fifth-youngest player to record around 900 points during a rookie season and the sixth-youngest player to do it before turning 20 years old, and the seventh player overall behind LeBron James, Dwight Howard, Kobe Bryant, Kevin Durant, Carmelo Anthony, and Tracy McGrady to record 900 points in the NBA while still being a teenager.
- Devin Booker became the second-youngest rookie to ever record 11 assists in at least one game on March 12, 2016, against the defending champion Golden State Warriors, being behind only LeBron James, who did it twice.
- Devin Booker became the first rookie since Stephen Curry in the 2009–10 season (or Blake Griffin in the 2010–11 season if you exclude the fact that his original rookie season had him out for that entire season due to a knee injury and that his second season is technically his rookie season now) to record 6 different 30+ point games during his rookie season.
- Center Tyson Chandler overtook power forward/center Johnny Green to become the 49th best rebounder of all-time on April 1, 2016 at home against Markieff Morris and the Washington Wizards. He'd tie Johnny's mark by grabbing his 7th rebound with about 4 minutes left in the second quarter off of a Marcin Gortat miss and then grab his 8th rebound to surpass Johnny Green's mark less than a minute later. He'd end up with a game-high 15 rebounds in a 106–99 loss to the Wizards that night.
- Devin Booker recorded the fourth-highest 30+ point games during a rookie season (with six games) while still a teenager, behind only LeBron James, Kevin Durant, and Carmelo Anthony.
- Devin Booker became the fourth-youngest player to record over 1,000 points during a rookie season (behind only LeBron James and Kevin Durant), as well the fourth-youngest player overall (with Kobe Bryant joining the list when including his second season in the NBA). He also became the sixth player to record over 1,000 points in the NBA as a teenager, during the 121–100 blowout victory over the New Orleans Pelicans on April 9, 2016.

=== Team milestones ===
- The signing of Tyson Chandler marked the first time (excluding Ben Wallace's temporary move to Phoenix back in June 2009 in order to trade away star center Shaquille O'Neal) that the Suns had gotten a Defensive Player of the Year winner — current or former — to become a part of their roster.
- The Suns won three straight games by 14 or more points, from November 12–16. It was the first time the Suns won three straight games by such a wide margin of victory since the 2009–10 season.
- Brandon Knight recorded the most 30+ point games for the Suns in their first twelve games of the regular season since Amar'e Stoudemire back in the 2004–05 Phoenix Suns season.
- Tyson Chandler recorded multiple games of at least 20 rebounds on January 21 and 23, 2016 (including a record-high tying 27 rebounds against the Atlanta Hawks), thus making him the first player to ever record such a feat with the Phoenix Suns.
- Markieff Morris surpassed former Suns shooting guard Joe Johnson to become the Suns' newest 30th best scorer in team history on February 2, 2016 (which was also interim head coach Earl Watson's debut in coaching the Suns). He scored his 3,848th point by successfully completing a three-point dunk (as in making a regular dunk with an extra free-throw to add onto it) with 5:20 left in the first quarter. Morris scored 14 points in the first quarter and over 30 points in the game (as well as having 11 rebounds and 6 assists) in a loss to the Raptors.
- Markieff Morris overtook former forward Cedric Ceballos as the new 29th best scorer in Suns history on February 8, 2016, against the Oklahoma City Thunder. Morris scored a game-high 23 points, including making a turnaround jump shot (with a foul for an extra free-throw) to surpass Cedric in the fourth quarter in a loss to the Thunder.
- Markieff Morris then surpassed former center James Edwards as the Suns' newest 28th best scorer in team history two days later against the defending champion Golden State Warriors. He scored his 14th point by making a jump shot early in the third quarter and recorded a total of 19 points in a loss against Golden State.
- Devin Booker became the first Suns rookie to record multiple double-doubles in a season since Amar'e Stoudemire during the 2002–03 season on the same February 10, 2016 game against the Warriors (by recording 15 points, 10 assists, and even 7 rebounds) after he recorded his first double-double a month earlier (with 17 points and 10 rebounds) against the Charlotte Hornets.
- Mirza Teletović was the first player since Amar'e Stoudemire back in the 2009–10 season to record 30 points and 11 rebounds in a single game on February 25, 2016, against his former team, the Brooklyn Nets.
- The February 25 and 27 home games against the Brooklyn Nets and Memphis Grizzlies marked the first time the Suns had three players recording double-digit rebounds in multiple games, with Mirza Teletović, Tyson Chandler, and Kris Humphries doing it against Brooklyn and Tyson Chandler, P. J. Tucker. and Alex Len doing it against Memphis, since March 31 and April 1, 2008, both of which were against the Denver Nuggets.
- Devin Booker became the first rookie since Richard Dumas from the 1992–93 season to record multiple games of 30+ points in his rookie season after recording a new (at the time) career-high 34 points on March 3, 2016, in a loss against the Miami Heat to go with the 32 points he'd score earlier in a close loss to the Indiana Pacers. He'd also join former players Cedric Ceballos twice and eventual Phoenix Suns Ring of Honor players Alvan Adams three times and Walter Davis twelve different times as the only other rookies to score 32 or more points for the team in their rookie seasons.
  - Devin Booker had at least five games of 32 or more points (six for 30 or more points) to close out the season, thus making him the second-highest rookie to score 32 or more points during their rookie season.
- Alex Len became the 100th player in franchise history to score over 1,000 points for the Suns with his 31 points he'd record in a blowout 102–94 victory over the Orlando Magic on March 4, 2016. Furthermore, he became the second-youngest Suns player to ever record a 30+ points and 15+ rebounds (the youngest Suns player to do it was Amar'e Stoudemire four different times), as well as become the first Suns player since Stoudemire in the 2009–10 season to record such numbers for the team.
- From February 27 to March 6, 2016, Alex Len recorded five straight double-doubles of various performances. This was the longest streak since Shawn Marion with 11 straight double-doubles during the 2000–01 season (with Len being about 70 days younger than Marion at the time). In addition, Len had the longest streak of double-doubles with 12 or more points and rebounds of five games since Shawn Marion in the 2005–06 season, as well as become the first Suns player since Marcin Gortat in the lockout-shortened 2011–12 season to record five straight double-doubles involving points and rebounds.
- The March 6, 2016 performance where rookie Devin Booker had 27 points and 9 assists in a 109–100 victory over the Memphis Grizzlies made him the first Suns rookie since Michael Finley during his only full season with the Suns in 1996 to record a similar statline in a game, as well as one of six players alongside LeBron James, Kyrie Irving, former Suns player Stephon Marbury, Carmelo Anthony, and Kevin Durant to record such a line while still being a teenager in the NBA.
- The March 9 and 10, 2016 games against the New York Knicks and the Denver Nuggets, respectively, became the first time a Suns player (rookie Devin Booker) had back-to-back 30+ point games in a season since Amar'e Stoudemire back in 2010.
  - Furthermore, the 35-point performance against the Denver Nuggets made Devin Booker the youngest player to ever have a 35-point game against another NBA team, beating out Amar'e Stoudemire during his rookie season back when he was 20 years old.
- In the February and March games against the defending champion Golden State Warriors, Devin Booker had two different double-doubles with 15 points and 10 assists (with 7 rebounds) on the February 10th game and then put up 18 points and a new season-high 11 assists on the March 12th game. As a result, Devin Booker became the first Suns rookie since Negele Knight in the 1990–91 season to record multiple games involving double-doubles for points and assists.
  - Furthermore, the game on March where he had 11 assists against Golden State was the highest number of assists in Suns history for a rookie, beating out the record that was set by teammate Archie Goodwin during the 2013–14 season.
- From February 28 to March 17, 2016, Alex Len recorded a career-high (at this time) 10 straight games of 10 or more rebounds. It was the most recorded under a single stretch of time since Marcin Gortat did it under the lockout 2011–12 season, and he was the youngest player to ever record 10 or more games of 10 or more rebounds for the Suns since Shawn Marion during the 2000–01 season.
- The four games in which rookie Devin Booker recorded 30 or more points for the month of March was the first time since Amar'e Stoudemire in March 2010 that a Suns player had four or more games with 30 or more points against an opponent.
- Devin Booker became only the fifth rookie in Suns history to record at least 900 points in franchise history behind only Amar'e Stoudemire, Michael Finley, Walter Davis, and Alvan Adams, and the youngest player in franchise history to do so.
- The 22.4 points that Devin Booker recorded was the highest for a Suns rookie in the month of March since Walter Davis averaged 25.1 points per game in March 1978.
- The March 30 and April 1, 2016 games resulted in the first time three different Suns players got three points/rebounds double-double in multiple games since Tom Chambers, Dan Majerle, and Mark West did it back in 1989. Centers Alex Len and Tyson Chandler, as well as small forward P. J. Tucker recorded their double-doubles on the March 30 game against the Milwaukee Bucks, while center Tyson Chandler, small forward P. J. Tucker, and power forward Mirza Teletović recorded theirs in Markieff Morris' debut against the Suns as an opponent on April 1 against the Washington Wizards.
- Devin Booker became the youngest player in franchise history to record over 1,000 points as a rookie, beating out the record set by Amar'e Stoudemire, who had gone straight out of high school to play in the NBA. He recorded his 1,000th point on April 9, 2016, with 10:51 left in the first quarter against the New Orleans Pelicans and finished with 16 points in a blowout 121–100 victory over the New Orleans Pelicans. He also became the fifth player in franchise history behind Alvan Adams, Walter Davis, Michael Finley, and Amar'e Stoudemire to record over 1,000 points for the Suns during their rookie seasons.
- Mirza Teletović tied Eddie Johnson for the most 20+ point games coming off the bench in the month of April with 6 games since the 1983–84 season. He also tied both Isaiah Thomas and Joe Johnson with four straight games of 20+ point outings coming off the bench since the 2000–01 season.
- Alan Williams became the sixth rookie to record a double-double for the Suns during their first 10 games of their rookie season. He'd join the likes of Markieff Morris, Shawn Marion, Steve Nash, Armen Gilliam, and Georgi Glouchkov since the 1983–84 season by recording a double-double of 14 points and 12 rebounds during the last game of the season with a 114–105 victory over the Los Angeles Clippers on April 13, 2016.
- Devin Booker recorded the highest scoring averages of any Suns rookie since Michael Finley during the 1995–96 season.
- Devin Booker had the highest number of votes ever for a Suns player in the NBA Rookie of The Year Award voting since Amar'e Stoudemire won the award over #1 draft pick and eventual Hall of Famer Yao Ming in 2003.
- Devin Booker became the first Sun to make it to the NBA All-Rookie First Team since the soon-to-be former NBA player Amar'e Stoudemire last did it in 2003.

== Transactions ==
=== Trades ===
June 25, 2015

To Memphis Grizzlies

(United States) Andrew Harrison

To Phoenix Suns

(United States) Jon Leuer

July 2, 2015

To Detroit Pistons

(United States) Marcus Morris
(United States) Reggie Bullock
(United States) Danny Granger

To Phoenix Suns

2020 second-round pick

February 18, 2016

To Washington Wizards

(United States) Markieff Morris

To Phoenix Suns

(United States) DeJuan Blair
(United States) Kris Humphries
2016 Top 9 Protected first round pick
$1.56 Million Traded Player Exception

=== Free agents ===
==== Re-signed ====
| Player | Signed | Date |
|---|---|---|
| Brandon Knight | Signed 5-year deal worth $70 Million | July 1, 2015 |
| Cory Jefferson | Signed a 10-day contract worth $55,722 (total combined earned price $362,878) | January 20, 2016 |

==== Additions ====
| Player | Signed | Former Team |
|---|---|---|
| Tyson Chandler | Signed 4-year deal worth $52 Million | Dallas Mavericks |
| Sonny Weems | Signed 2-year (team option) deal worth $5.8 Million | (Russia) PBC CSKA Moscow |
| Ronnie Price | Signed 1-year deal worth $1.5 Million | Los Angeles Lakers |
| Mirza Teletović | Signed 1-year deal worth $5.5 Million | Brooklyn Nets |
| Cory Jefferson | Signed 1-year non-guaranteed deal worth $845,059 | Brooklyn Nets / Phoenix Suns / Bakersfield Jam |
| Bryce Cotton | Signed 1-year non-guaranteed deal for $700,901 | Utah Jazz / Austin Spurs |
| Lorenzo Brown | Signed two 10-day contracts worth $111,444 | Minnesota Timberwolves / Grand Rapids Drive / Phoenix Suns |
| Jordan McRae | Signed two 10-day contracts worth $61,775 | Philadelphia 76ers / Delaware 87ers / Phoenix Suns |
| Orlando Johnson | Signed a 10-day contract worth $55,722 | Austin Spurs |
| Phil Pressey | Signed two 10-day contracts worth $111,444 | Philadelphia 76ers / Idaho Stampede / Phoenix Suns |
| John Jenkins | Signed 3-year non-guaranteed deal worth $3,211,302 | Dallas Mavericks |
| Alan Williams | Signed a 10-day contract / 2-year deal worth $988,920 | (China) Qingdao DoubleStar Eagles |
| Chase Budinger | Signed 1-year deal worth $258,082 | Indiana Pacers |

a: While Cory Jefferson initially signed with the Suns when he was the only training camp invitee to become a part of the team earlier in the season, he was waived after the January 7, 2016 game against the Charlotte Hornets, thus earning only a partially guaranteed salary in the process. However, he returned to the Suns on January 20, 2016 for a 10-day contract because the Suns had no other power forwards when Markieff Morris, Mirza Teletović, and Jon Leuer were all out either due to injuries or ailments around that period. Once all three players returned to action when Jefferson was due for a new contract, the Suns decided not to give him another 10-day contract. As a result of those two deals and the time he spent with the group, Jefferson ended up with a total of $362,878 earned throughout with time with the team.
b: While Sonny Weems earned guaranteed money throughout his time with the Suns, he was not fully guaranteed. While Sonny was initially guaranteed the money he was fully expected to get this season, he stopped receiving money from the team on March 7, 2016 when he was waived. For the rest of the cash the team owed Weems, he was paid the rest of the amount needed to make sure he was satisfied and left in the process.
c: Cory Jefferson was originally a part of the Brooklyn Nets when he first signed up with the team. However, when he earned that 10-day contract in January, he got it when he was signing up with the affiliate Bakersfield Jam a day earlier. Yet even though he signed a contract with the Jam earlier in the season, he never really played with the Jam until after his 10-day contract expired with the Suns, so it technically meant that Jefferson re-signed with the team when he entered that 10-day contract of his.
d: When Bryce Cotton initially signed his one-year deal with the Suns, he signed a non-guaranteed deal that was worth $700,901, similar to what Cory Jefferson was getting when he first signed up with the team. However, when he got waived in the same day that Jefferson first was waived on January 6, Bryce earned about $228,663 for the services he had provided for his hometown sports team.
e: Even though Bryce Cotton was originally a player for the Utah Jazz when the season initially began, he started the regular season with player development/assistant/(interim) head coach Earl Watson's former team, the Austin Spurs, before signing his contract with the Suns in November 2015.
f: While all three of these players earned their second 10-day contracts with the team on various days of their original tenures, each earned them in different tenures. Lorenzo Brown started as a part of the Minnesota Timberwolves team earlier in the season before starting his regular season with the Grand Rapids Drive and then going to the Suns on January 8, 2016. Both Jerel McNeal and Phil Pressey began their seasons as teammates on the Philadelphia 76ers, but wound up with the Suns under different manners with McNeal taking part of Philadelphia's D-League affiliate team, the Delaware 87ers, for starting out his season before starting his NBA tenure on January 28, 2016, and Pressey decided to start his season in the Idaho Stampede (during their last year under that team name) before beginning his tenure with the Suns on February 21, 2016. All three earned two 10-day contracts, but none stayed on the team beyond their required amount of time (including McNeal staying on for two more days because of an NBA rule requiring the player being involved with at least three games during their contract).

==== Subtractions ====
| Player | Reason left | New team |
|---|---|---|
| Andrew Harrison | Traded after being drafted | Memphis Grizzlies / Iowa Energy |
| Brandan Wright | Unrestricted free agent | Memphis Grizzlies |
| Marcus Morris; Reggie Bullock; Danny Granger | Traded | Detroit Pistons |
| Gerald Green | Unrestricted free agent | Miami Heat |
| Marcus Thornton | Unrestricted free agent | Houston Rockets / Washington Wizards |
| Earl Barron | Unrestricted free agent | Atlanta Hawks / (Taiwan) Fubon Braves |
| Jerel McNeal | Waived / Unrestricted free agent | (Greece) Aris Thessaloniki |
| Cory Jefferson | Waived / 10-day contract expired | Phoenix Suns / Bakersfield Jam |
| Bryce Cotton | Waived | Austin Spurs / (China) Xinjiang Tianshin Rural-Commercial Bank Flying Tigers / Memphis Grizzlies |
| Lorenzo Brown | Second 10-day contract expired | Phoenix Suns / Grand Rapids Drive / Detroit Pistons |
| Orlando Johnson | Waived / 10-day contract expired | Austin Spurs / New Orleans Pelicans |
| Markieff Morris | Traded | Washington Wizards |
| Jordan McRae | Second 10-day contract expired | Phoenix Suns / Delaware 87ers / Cleveland Cavaliers |
| DeJuan Blair | Waived | (China) Jiangsu Tongxi Monkey King / Texas Legends / Los Angeles D-Fenders |
| Kris Humphries | Waived / Contract Buyout | Atlanta Hawks |
| Sonny Weems | Waived | Philadelphia 76ers / (Israel) Maccabi Tel Aviv |
| Phil Pressey | Second 10-day contract expired | Phoenix Suns / Idaho Stampede |

g: While Andrew Harrison never played for the Suns throughout his tenure, he was drafted by the Suns before being traded away for Jon Leuer the same day, thus making him a brief member of the team at that time.
h: Andrew Harrison was traded to the Memphis Grizzlies in the aforementioned draft day trade involving Jon Leuer, but he did not play a game for the Grizzlies this season. Instead, Harrison spent the entire season with the Grizzlies' D-League affiliate team, the Iowa Energy. He played with Memphis the following year.
i: While all three of these players ended up going to the Detroit Pistons on July 2, 2015, they all had different experiences there. Marcus Morris (the twin brother of Markieff Morris) was a starter for the Pistons, while Reggie Bullock alternated his time between coming off the bench for Detroit and playing in their own D-League affiliate, the Grand Rapids Drive, throughout the season. Former All-Star small forward Danny Granger, continued to heal from the injury he had back when he was with the Miami Heat and was waived by the Pistons before the start of the season because of it. As of November 16, 2017, Granger made his unofficial retirement with interests like real estate and being a college basketball sports analyst for the CBS Sports Network taking over his time.
j: Marcus Thornton originally signed a one-year deal to play with the Houston Rockets as a result of them making it to the Western Conference Finals the previous season. However, because the Rockets had a poor season this time, they attempted to trade Thornton in a three-way deal at the trade deadline involving the Philadelphia 76ers and the Detroit Pistons, in which Thornton would be dealt alongside Donatas Motiejūnas to the Pistons in exchange for Detroit's 2016 first round draft pick. However, a few days after the trade, the Pistons rescinded the trade due to a problem involving Motiejūnas, and the Rockets were eventually forced to waive Thornton in order for them to get rid of their mistake they had with having Ty Lawson on their team. A few days after Thornton was waived, instead of reuniting with former teammates Marcus Morris and Reggie Bullock on the Pistons, he was reunited with former teammate Markieff Morris on the Washington Wizards on March 9, 2016, replacing the injured Gary Neal in the process.
k: Initially, Earl Barron signed a one-year deal to play with the Atlanta Hawks Basketball Club during this season. However, before the regular season even began, Barron was waived. With nowhere else to turn to, he decided to play in Taiwan as the newest center for the Fubon Braves.
l: Cory Jefferson originally signed a contract with the Bakersfield Jam on January 19, 2016, a few weeks after being waived from the Suns earlier in the season. However, because of the aforementioned problems involving the team's power forwards during the stretch of January 20–30, 2016, Jefferson returned to the Phoenix Suns a day after he signed his original contract with the Jam. When his second stretch with the Suns ended, Jefferson decided to return to the Bakersfield Jam for the rest of their last season under that name. They were renamed the Northern Arizona Suns at the end of the NBA season.
m: When Bryce Cotton was originally waived by the Suns on January 7, 2016, he returned to the Austin Spurs in the D-League during most of January afterwards. However, Cotton soon left the Spurs to play with future NBA draft prospect Zhou Qi and the Xinjiang Tianshan Rural-Commercial Bank Flying Tigers in the first-tier Chinese Basketball Association on January 30, 2016. After the Flying Tigers were eliminated from the 2016 CBA Playoffs by former Phoenix Suns player Hamed Haddadi and the eventual champion Sichuan Blue Whales, Cotton returned to the NBA on April 1, 2016 for a ten-day contract with the very shorthanded Memphis Grizzlies, and signed signing with the Grizzlies for the rest of the season on April 11, 2016, although he wasn't able to play for Memphis in the playoffs due to league regulations.
n: After completing his first 10-day contract with the Suns, Lorenzo Brown returned for a second 10-day contract and then went back to the Grand Rapids Drive soon afterward. On March 25, 2016, Lorenzo signed with the Detroit Pistons for the rest of the season, although he did not play for them. He had originally try to play for the UNICS Kazan in Russia on November 4, 2016, but was waived before playing a single game for them after failing a physical. However, he played for the Zhejiang Golden Bulls on December 8, 2016 in the first-tier Chinese Basketball Association because one of Zhejiang's international players, the Haitian Cady Lalanne, got injured early in their season, and Brown was his replacement. After that, he returned to the Grand Rapids Drive on March 3, 2017 and did not get another chance to play for the Detroit Pistons late in the season.
o: When Orlando Johnson finished his only 10-day contract with the Suns, he returned to the Austin Spurs after the All-Star Weekend before making a brief stint with the New Orleans Pelicans late in March. After he finished his 10-day contract with New Orleans, he went back to Austin again for the rest of the season. Johnson later played for the Guangxi Rhino under the second-tier Chinese National Basketball League's Division A playoffs, but by that time, it was under the beginning of the 2016–17 NBA season in July 2016 instead of the end of this season in June 2016.
p: When Jerel McNeal finished his first 10-day contract with the Suns, he continued on a second 10-day contract before briefly returning with the Delaware 87ers on February 25, 2016. After a few days with Delaware, he signed with the eventual champion Cleveland Cavaliers.
q: Even though DeJuan Blair was never a player for the Suns during the brief time he was in Phoenix, he stayed with the team for four days before being waived on February 22, 2016. He did not find a new team to play for until September 7, 2016, when he found a spot with the Jiangsu Tongxi Monkey King of the first-tier Chinese Basketball Association. However, he was cut after playing 10 games for Jiangsu in November 2016, mainly for the purpose of signing former one-time Suns training camp invitee Ike Diogu. Afterwards, he signed with the Texas Legends on January 17, 2017 before being traded to the Los Angeles D-Fenders on February 11, 2017 for a fourth round draft pick.
r: After Sonny Weems being waived by the Suns on March 7, 2016, he was signed by the Philadelphia 76ers a few days later. However, because of an injury involving his leg later in the season, Weems was waived by the 76ers on March 29, 2016, and returned to Europe with future Suns draft pick Dragan Bender and his team, Maccabi Tel Aviv, on a two-year deal worth $5,755,000 on April 7, 2016 (although that deal wasn't official until June 13, 2016 due to Israel's season still going on at the time Weems made that deal).
s: When Phil Pressey completed his first 10-day contract, he returned to finish his second 10-day contract. He then finished the season with the last games of the Idaho Stampede's existence before the team moved to Salt Lake City, Utah and became the Salt Lake City Stars, similar to what happened with the Bakersfield Jam becoming the Northern Arizona Suns after this season ended.

== See also ==
- 2015–16 NBA season
