= T. J. Warren =

American basketball player (born 1993)

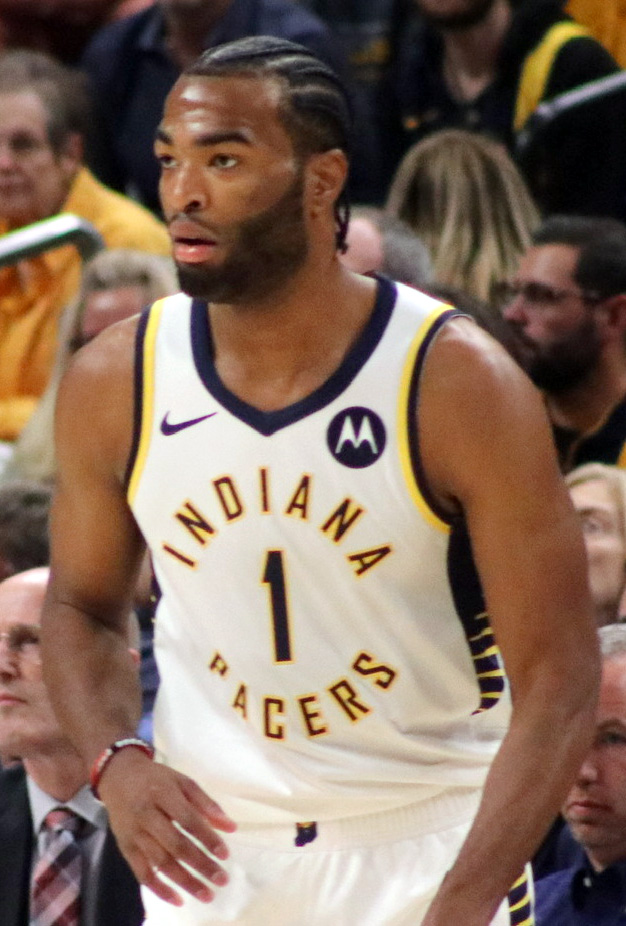
- Warren with the Indiana Pacers in 2019

No. 1 – Paris Basketball
- Position: Small forward / power forward
- League: LNB Élite; EuroLeague

Personal information
- Born: September 5, 1993 (age 33) Durham, North Carolina, U.S.
- Listed height: 6 ft 8 in (2.03 m)
- Listed weight: 220 lb (100 kg)

Career information
- High school: Brewster Academy (Wolfeboro, New Hampshire)
- College: NC State (2012–2014)
- NBA draft: 2014: 1st round, 14th overall pick
- Drafted by: Phoenix Suns
- Playing career: 2014–present

Career history
- 2014–2019: Phoenix Suns
- 2019–2022: Indiana Pacers
- 2022–2023: Brooklyn Nets
- 2023: Phoenix Suns
- 2024: Minnesota Timberwolves
- 2024–2026: Westchester Knicks
- 2026–present: Paris Basketball

Career highlights
- All-NBA G League Third Team (2025); Consensus second-team All-American (2014); ACC Player of the Year (2014); First-team All-ACC (2014); ACC All-Freshmen Team (2013); No. 24 jersey honored by NC State Wolfpack; McDonald's All-American (2012)
- Stats at NBA.com
- Stats at Basketball Reference

Anthony "T. J." Warren Jr. (born September 5, 1993) is an American professional basketball player for Paris Basketball of the LNB Élite and the EuroLeague. He played college basketball as a small forward for the NC State Wolfpack in the Atlantic Coast Conference (ACC). In the 2013–14 season, he earned consensus second-team All-American honors and was named the ACC Player of the Year after leading the conference in scoring with 24.9 points per game.

Warren was picked in the first round of the 2014 NBA draft with the 14th overall pick by the Phoenix Suns, where he spent five seasons with the team before being traded to the Indiana Pacers in 2019. During the NBA bubble in 2020, Warren had a breakout performance, averaging 31.0 points per game and a career-high 53-point game against the Philadelphia 76ers. After injuries derailed his final few years in Indiana, Warren signed with the Brooklyn Nets in 2022 and was traded back to the Suns in 2023. He has also played for the Minnesota Timberwolves and the Westchester Knicks of the NBA G League.

== High school career ==
Warren graduated from Brewster Academy, but Warren also attended Riverside High School and Word of God Christian Academy prior to Brewster. He averaged 14 points per game on Word of God's team and his team finished the season at 24–3. While at Brewster Academy in Wolfeboro, New Hampshire, Warren was a small forward for his varsity basketball team. Warren earned 1st Team All NEPSAC honors and led his team to the National Prep Championship finishing with a record of 33–1. Ranked number 32 in the MaxPreps Class of 2012 Top 100, Warren became a hot commodity for college recruits. During his senior year of high school, Warren was viewed by multiple colleges, including North Carolina State University, Georgetown, and University of North Carolina. After visiting some of his prospective schools, Warren officially committed to North Carolina State University on November 2, 2011. Warren was recruited by Orlando Early, the assistant coach at NCSU. Warren was part of the second highest ranked college basketball draft class by CBSsports along with Tyler Lewis and Rodney Purvis. All three of the players were All-Americans and natives of North Carolina. He became the 23rd ranked prospect on the ESPN recruiting board for the 2012 recruiting class before committing to play for North Carolina State University.

== College career ==
=== NC State (2012–2014) ===
==== Freshman season ====
As part of the 2012–13 NC State Wolfpack men's basketball team, as a freshman Warren averaged 12.1 points a game and 4.2 rebounds in 27 minutes per game earning him a spot on the ACC All-Freshmen Team. He also led the ACC in shooting percentage that year at .622, or 62.2%. Warren's best game that season came against Florida State on February 19, 2013, where he scored 31 points and had 13 rebounds. He helped lead the Wolfpack back into the National Collegiate Athletic Association (NCAA) Tournament. As an 8 seed, they lost to Temple University in the first round of the NCAA tournament. The loss ended the team's season with a 24–11 record.

==== Sophomore season ====
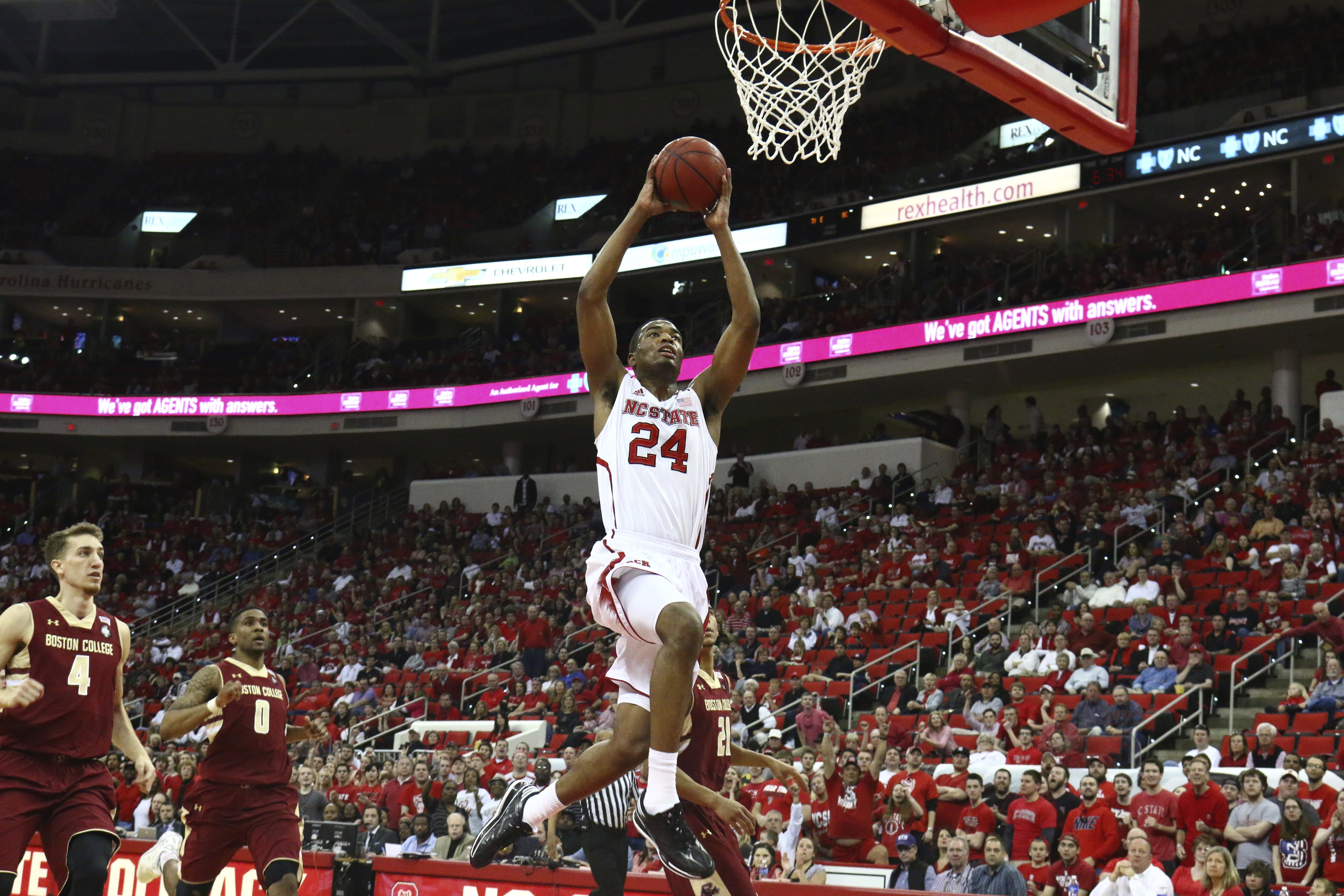
Warren dunks versus Boston College

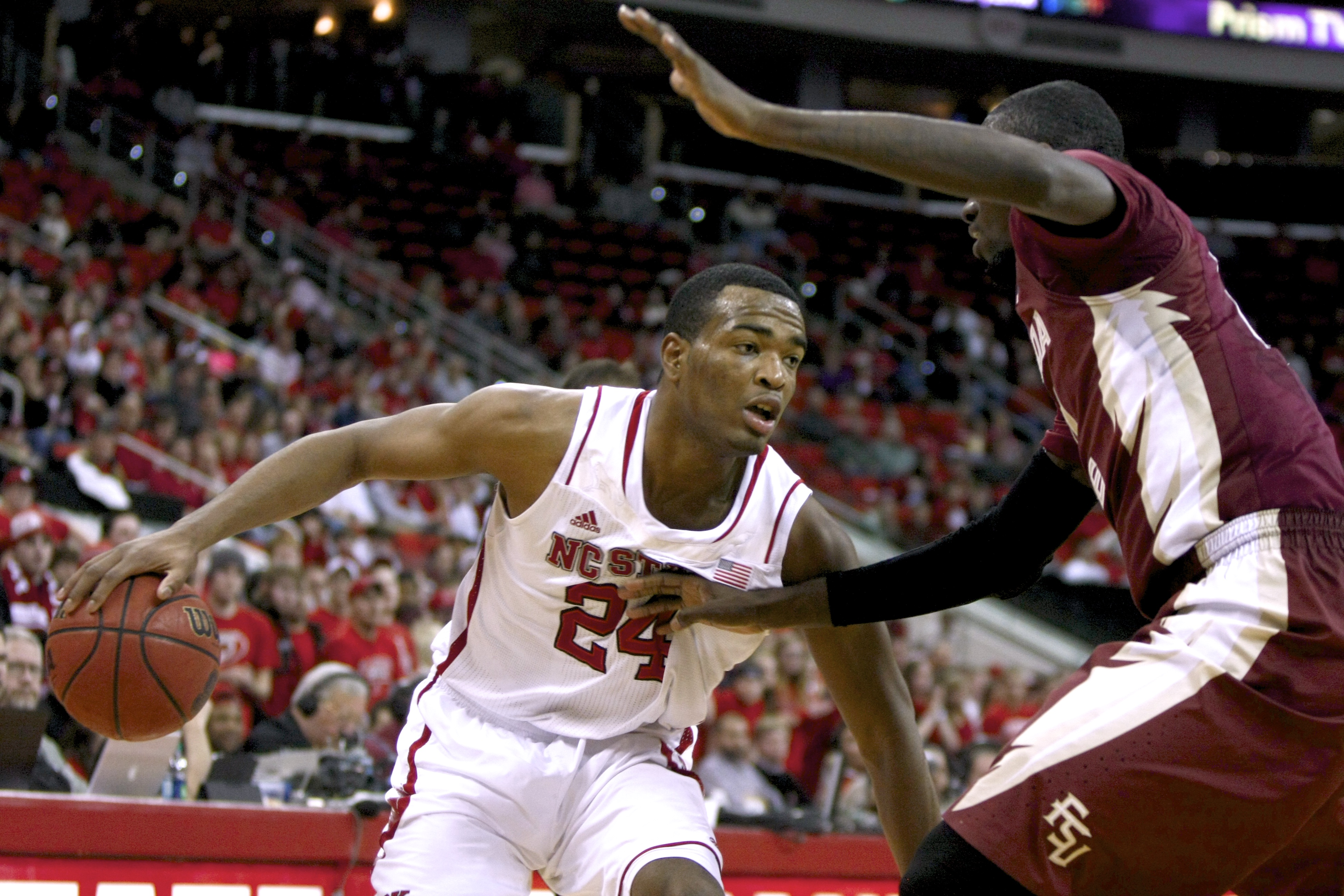
Warren dribbling against Florida State

Warren decided to stay for his sophomore year despite being rated as one of the top 31 prospects in the NBA draft during his freshman year. His main influence was his father who convinced him that playing another year at NC State would benefit Warren more, by allowing him to further develop his basketball skills and also improve his draft spot for the NBA. His father is Tony Warren Sr., who played for NC State from 1977 to 1979 under Norm Sloan. Warren only averaged 27 minutes a game his freshman season, but knew his minutes would increase his sophomore year due to NC State's basketball team losing all of their starters from the previous year. Warren showed great great potential during his Freshman year, but didn't get to put his talents on full display due to the fact that he played more of a sixth man role as opposed to starting.

Warren truly blossomed his sophomore year, he had career highs in points with 41 against Pittsburgh, followed by a 42-point performance versus Boston College. He led his team to the final 64 in NCAA tournament, with a 12 seed, after beating Xavier in the first four, but ended his sophomore season losing to St. Louis in the second round after scoring 28 points. For the year, Warren averaged 24.9 points and 7.1 rebounds per game while playing an average of 35.4 minutes per game.

Warren led his school to a 22–14 record and went 9–9 in the ACC in his sophomore year. He ended up leading the team with 7.1 rebounds per game and 1.8 steals per game. He was also the first player from the school to win ACC Player of the Year since Julius Hodge.

In April 2014, Warren declared for the NBA draft, foregoing his final two years of college eligibility.

=== Awards and honors ===
In 2014, Warren was in the running for the 38th Annual Wooden Award which is awarded to the National Player of the Year for the collegiate basketball season. He was named to the Mid-Season Wooden Watch list where he was one of 25 players seriously considered for the award.

At the end of the 2014 season, Warren was one of the top in the ACC in offensive rebounds and was among the league leaders in both overall rebounding and steals. At the conclusion of the regular season, Warren was named ACC Player of the Year. Warren was also named second team All-American by the Associated Press and The Sporting News at the end of the season, as well as first team All-ACC.

On February 24, 2019, Warren was honored by NC State, with his no. 24 jersey being raised to the rafters of PNC Arena in a pregame ceremony.

== Professional career ==
=== Phoenix Suns (2014–2019) ===
On June 26, 2014, Warren was selected with the 14th overall pick by the Phoenix Suns in the 2014 NBA draft. On July 12, 2014, Warren made his NBA Summer League debut, recording 22 points and 4 rebounds in a loss to the Golden State Warriors. He went on to earn All-NBA Summer League second team honors. On August 8, 2014, he signed with the Suns. On October 21, 2014, Warren sustained a small crack in a bone in his left thumb, sidelining him for a few weeks. He returned from injury on November 9 to make his NBA debut against Golden State. He recorded no points in just over a minute of action in a 107–95 win. He went on to record his first NBA career points and rebounds with seven and three respectively in the Suns' 118–114 win over the Boston Celtics on November 17. During his rookie season, Warren received multiple assignments to the Bakersfield Jam of the NBA Development League.

On March 11, 2015, Warren had a season-best game with 17 points on 8-of-10 shooting and 5 rebounds in a 106–97 win over the Minnesota Timberwolves. On March 29, he scored a season-high 18 points in a season defining 109–97 loss to the Oklahoma City Thunder. On April 4, he scored 15 of his 17 points in the fourth quarter against the Golden State Warriors in a close 107–106 loss. Finally, to end the 2014–15 season, Warren had his first professional start as a power forward in a loss to the Los Angeles Clippers.

In July 2015, Warren re-joined the Suns for the 2015 NBA Summer League. After averaging 22.4 points per game in Las Vegas, Warren earned All-NBA Summer League first team honors. On November 12, 2015, he tied his career-high of 18 points in a 118–104 win over the Los Angeles Clippers. Four days later, Warren surpassed that mark by scoring 19 points in a 120–101 win over the Los Angeles Lakers. He was once again very efficient against the Lakers, being the ninth time he made two-thirds of his shots on at least nine attempts in his first 50 NBA appearances, becoming the first player since Yao Ming to do so. On November 27, he scored a then career-high 28 points in a loss to the Golden State Warriors. Two days later, he recorded his first career double-double with 15 points and 11 rebounds in a 107–102 win over the Toronto Raptors. On December 31, he scored a career-high 29 points in a loss to the Oklahoma City Thunder. On February 2, 2016, Warren was ruled out for the rest of the season with a broken right foot.

In September 2016, Warren returned to the court for the first time in nine months. The following month, he was named the team's starting small forward to begin the season with P. J. Tucker out injured. On October 28, 2016, Warren scored a career-high 30 points in a 113–110 overtime loss to the Oklahoma City Thunder. On November 2, he had his third 20-point game of the season, scoring 27 points in a 118–115 overtime win over the Portland Trail Blazers. Two days later, Warren recorded 18 points and six rebounds, and made a critical game-winning dunk with 7.1 seconds left in overtime, to lead the Suns to a 112–111 win over the New Orleans Pelicans. On November 23, he was ruled out indefinitely due to a minor head injury. He returned to action on December 17 against the Oklahoma City Thunder after missing 13 games. He returned to the starting line-up on December 31 against the Utah Jazz, and on January 2, he led the Suns with 24 points in a 109–98 loss to the Los Angeles Clippers. On March 9, he had 17 points and a career-high 13 rebounds in a 122–110 loss to the Los Angeles Lakers. On April 7, he set a new career high with 16 rebounds to go with 23 points in a 120–99 win over the Oklahoma City Thunder.

On September 26, 2017, Warren signed a four-year, $50 million contract extension with the Suns. On November 1, 2017, he scored 28 of his career-high 40 points in the second half of the Suns' 122–116 win over the Washington Wizards. On November 11, 2017, he had a 35-point effort in a 118–110 win over the Minnesota Timberwolves.

On November 17, 2018, Warren scored 23 points in a 110–100 loss to the Oklahoma City Thunder. It was his fifth straight 20-point game, a career best. On December 13, he scored a season-high 30 points in a 99–89 win over the Dallas Mavericks.

=== Indiana Pacers (2019–2022) ===
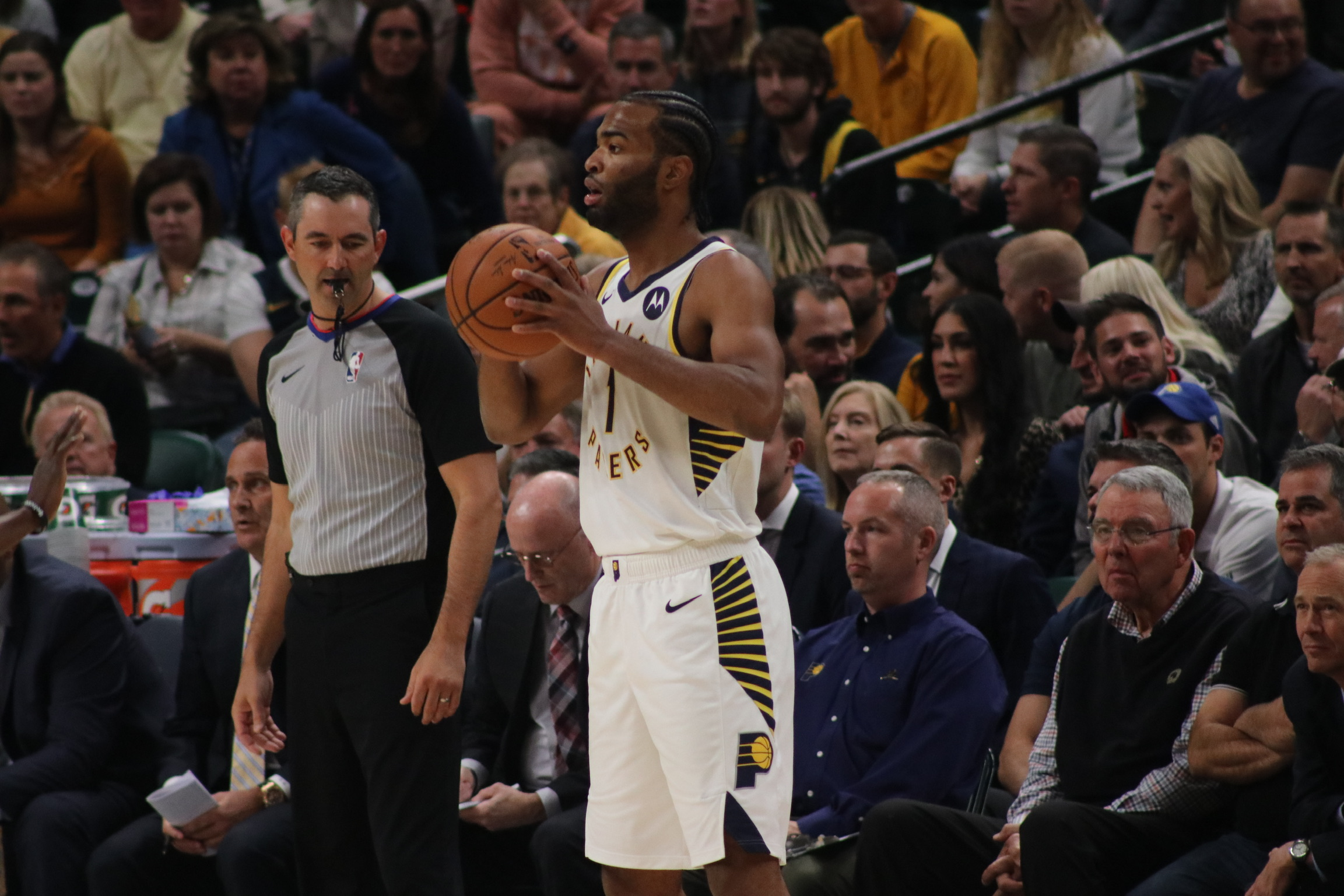
Warren playing for the Pacers in 2019

On June 20, 2019, Warren and KZ Okpala were traded to the Indiana Pacers. Okpala was then traded to the Miami Heat in exchange for three second-round picks. The Pacers sent money back to the Phoenix Suns. The trade was finalized on July 6, 2019. On February 12, 2020, Warren scored a team-high 35 points on 16–19 shooting, along with seven rebounds and four steals in a 118–111 victory over the Milwaukee Bucks. That season, he was one of three players on the roster using T. J. as their professional first name, along with teammates T. J. McConnell and T. J. Leaf.

On August 1, in the 2020 NBA Bubble, Warren scored a new career-high 53 points on 20/29 shooting (including 9/12 three-pointers scored) in a 127–121 win over the Philadelphia 76ers. He was also the first player to score 50+ points since the return of the NBA post hiatus. The performance was the third most points a player had ever scored in a single game in NBA franchise history, behind Reggie Miller's 57 points in 1992, and Jermaine O'Neal's 55 points in 2005. On August 15, Warren was named to the All-Bubble First Team after averaging 31 points across the 8 bubble seeding games.

On December 31, 2020, the Indiana Pacers announced that Warren would undergo surgery to repair a small left navicular stress fracture. Warren underwent surgery for the stress fracture as planned on January 4, 2021. He only played 4 games during the 2020–21 season. On March 17, 2022, Warren was ruled out for the remainder of the 2021–22 season. He had not played a game during the season.

=== Brooklyn Nets (2022–2023) ===
On July 7, 2022, Warren signed with the Brooklyn Nets. On December 2, he made his Nets debut, putting up 10 points, four rebounds, and one steal in a 114–105 win over the Toronto Raptors.

=== Return to Phoenix (2023) ===
On February 9, 2023, Warren was traded, alongside Kevin Durant, to the Phoenix Suns in exchange for Mikal Bridges, Cameron Johnson, Jae Crowder, four future first-round picks and a pick swap.

=== Minnesota Timberwolves (2024) ===
Warren signed consecutive 10-day contracts with the Minnesota Timberwolves on March 6 and March 16, 2024, respectively. After the expiration of his 10-day contract, Warren signed for the rest of the season on March 27.

=== Westchester Knicks (2024–2026) ===
On October 3, 2024, Warren signed with the New York Knicks, but was waived on October 19. On October 28, he joined the Westchester Knicks.

On February 16, 2026, Warren re-signed with Westchester.

=== Paris Basketball (2026–present) ===
On July 13, 2026, Warren signed with Paris Basketball of the French LNB Élite and the EuroLeague.

== Personal life ==
Warren is the son of former North Carolina State basketball player and rhythm and blues singer Tony Warren.

== Career statistics ==
Legend
GP	Games played	GS	Games started	MPG	Minutes per game
FG%	Field goal percentage	3P%	3-point field goal percentage	FT%	Free throw percentage
RPG	Rebounds per game	APG	Assists per game	SPG	Steals per game
BPG	Blocks per game	PPG	Points per game	**Bold**	Career high

=== NBA ===
==== Regular season ====
Year	Team	GP	GS	MPG	FG%	3P%	FT%	RPG	APG	SPG	BPG	PPG
2014–15	Phoenix	40	1	15.4	.528	.238	.737	2.1	.6	.5	.2	6.1
2015–16	Phoenix	47	4	22.8	.501	.400	.703	3.1	.9	.8	.3	11.0
2016–17	Phoenix	66	59	31.0	.495	.263	.773	**5.1**	1.1	1.2	.6	14.4
2017–18	Phoenix	65	65	**33.0**	.498	.222	.757	5.1	1.3	1.0	.6	19.6
2018–19	Phoenix	43	36	31.6	.486	**.428**	.815	4.0	**1.5**	**1.2**	**.7**	18.0
2019–20	Indiana	**67**	**67**	32.9	**.536**	.403	**.819**	4.2	1.5	1.2	.5	**19.8**
2020–21	Indiana	4	4	29.3	.529	.000	.800	3.5	1.3	.5	.0	15.5
2022–23	Brooklyn	26	0	18.8	.510	.333	.818	2.8	1.1	.6	.3	9.5
2022–23	Phoenix	16	0	12.3	.429	.316	.500	3.1	.7	.4	.3	4.2
2023–24	Minnesota	11	0	11.3	.439	.154	.750	2.0	.8	.4	.1	3.7
Career		385	236	26.9	.505	.351	.780	3.9	1.2	.9	.5	14.3

==== Playoffs ====
Year	Team	GP	GS	MPG	FG%	3P%	FT%	RPG	APG	SPG	BPG	PPG
2020	Indiana	4	**4**	**39.0**	**.471**	**.368**	**1.000**	**6.3**	**3.0**	**2.3**	.3	**20.0**
2023	Phoenix	**6**	0	13.4	.316	.143	.750	1.2	.5	.2	**.5**	2.7
2024	Minnesota	3	0	3.8	.000	.000	—	1.0	.3	.0	.0	.0
Career		13	4	19.1	.427	.296	.923	2.7	1.2	.8	.3	7.4

=== College ===
Year	Team	GP	GS	MPG	FG%	3P%	FT%	RPG	APG	SPG	BPG	PPG
2012–13	NC State	**35**	14	27.0	**.622**	**.519**	.542	4.2	.8	1.2	.4	12.1
2013–14	NC State	**35**	**35**	**35.4**	.525	.267	**.690**	**7.1**	**1.1**	**1.8**	**.6**	**24.9**
Career		70	49	31.2	.555	.315	.654	5.7	1.0	1.5	.5	18.5
