= Markieff Morris =

American basketball player (born 1989)

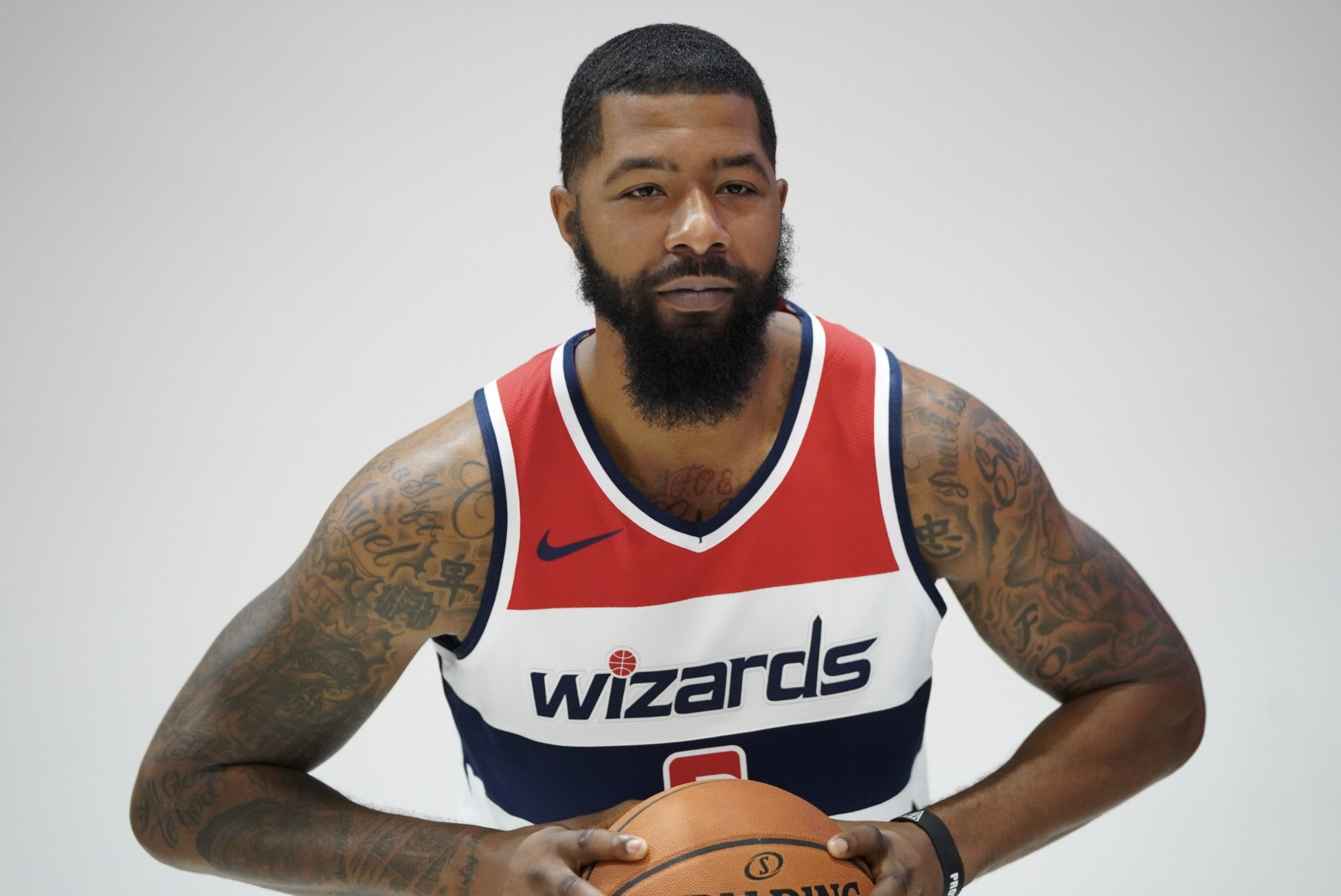
- Morris with the Washington Wizards in 2018

Free agent
- Position: Power forward

Personal information
- Born: September 2, 1989 (age 36) Philadelphia, Pennsylvania, U.S.
- Listed height: 6 ft 9 in (2.06 m)
- Listed weight: 245 lb (111 kg)

Career information
- High school: Prep Charter (Philadelphia, Pennsylvania); APEX Academy (Pennsauken, New Jersey)
- College: Kansas (2008–2011)
- NBA draft: 2011: 1st round, 13th overall pick
- Drafted by: Phoenix Suns
- Playing career: 2011–present

Career history
- 2011–2016: Phoenix Suns
- 2016–2019: Washington Wizards
- 2019: Oklahoma City Thunder
- 2019–2020: Detroit Pistons
- 2020–2021: Los Angeles Lakers
- 2021–2022: Miami Heat
- 2022–2023: Brooklyn Nets
- 2023–2025: Dallas Mavericks
- 2025: Los Angeles Lakers

Career highlights
- NBA champion (2020); Second-team All-Big 12 (2011)
- Stats at NBA.com
- Stats at Basketball Reference

Markieff Morris (/mɑːrˈkiːf/ mar-KEEF; born September 2, 1989) is an American professional basketball player who last played for the Los Angeles Lakers of the National Basketball Association (NBA). He played college basketball for the Kansas Jayhawks before being drafted 13th overall in the 2011 NBA draft by the Phoenix Suns. Morris won an NBA championship with the Lakers in 2020.

== Early years ==
Morris was born in Philadelphia, Pennsylvania. He has four brothers, including twin Marcus. Considered a four-star recruit by Rivals.com, Morris was listed as the No. 17 power forward and the No. 49 player in the nation in 2008.

== College career ==
Morris enrolled at the University of Kansas, where he majored in American studies. As a junior with the Jayhawks in 2011, Morris was named second-team all-conference in the Big 12. Both he and his brother, Marcus, signed with a sports agent from Los Angeles and announced that they would enter the 2011 NBA draft. Markieff was picked to the Fifth Team All-America by Fox Sports after his junior season.

== Professional career ==
=== Phoenix Suns (2011–2016) ===
==== 2011–12 season ====
Morris was selected by the Phoenix Suns with the 13th pick in the 2011 NBA draft. His twin brother, Marcus was drafted by the Houston Rockets five minutes later.

On January 8, 2012, Morris recorded his first professional double-double with 13 points and 10 rebounds in a blowout 109–93 victory over the Milwaukee Bucks. On January 18, Morris had his first professional start in the NBA against the New York Knicks. However, due to a stomach virus, Morris only played for five minutes, scoring three points and grabbing two steals before Channing Frye took over the power forward position in a 91–88 victory. On February 8, 2012, Morris was named to the 2012 Rising Stars challenge, making him the first Suns player since Amar'e Stoudemire to appear in the Rookie Challenge. Morris played for Team Shaq, recording 12 points and six rebounds. On March 25, he recorded a then career-high 22 points to tie Marcin Gortat as the game's leading scorer in a 108–83 victory over the Cleveland Cavaliers.

==== 2012–13 season ====
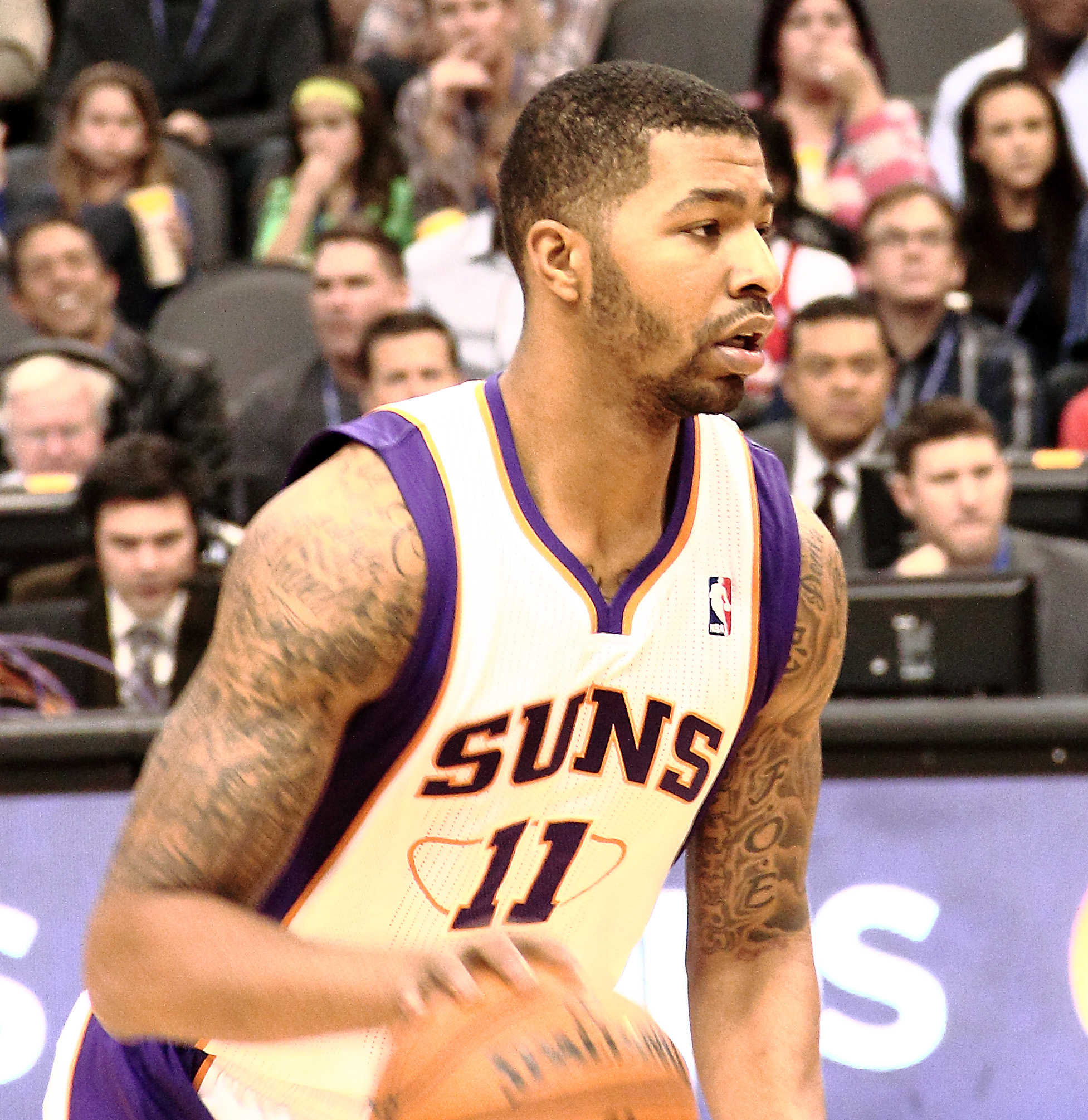
Morris in 2012

Due to the 2011 NBA lockout, Morris had his first Summer League stint in 2012, where he averaged 19.8 points and 9.8 rebounds per game. After this stint, Morris amassed 13 pounds of muscle while keeping his weight of 245 pounds. After scoring a then season-high 16 points against the defending champion Miami Heat, Morris made his first start of the season on November 21, 2012. Morris topped his season high in points by three and tied Marcin Gortat with seven rebounds in a victory over the Portland Trail Blazers. Two days later, Morris recorded a then career-high 23 points to lead the Suns to a 111–108 overtime victory over the New Orleans Hornets. On December 6, 2012, he recorded a career-high 17 rebounds to go along with 15 points in a 97–94 loss to the Dallas Mavericks.

On February 21, 2013, Morris' twin brother Marcus was traded to the Phoenix Suns, reuniting them after two years of playing for separate teams. This also marked the second time the Suns had twin brothers playing on the same team, with Dick and Tom Van Arsdale being the first twins to play together during the 1976–77 season. The Morris twins went on to become the first brothers ever to start alongside each other on the same team.

==== 2013–14 season ====
On November 6, 2013, Morris tied his career-high 23 points and added 12 rebounds in a loss to the San Antonio Spurs. He went on to post a new career-high two days later, scoring 28 points and grabbing 10 rebounds in a 114–103 victory over the Denver Nuggets. After scoring 23 points in a 101–94 win over the New Orleans Pelicans, Morris became the third player since 1989 to shoot over 75% from the field in three consecutive games with at least 12 attempts each game; Dwight Howard and Charles Barkley were the first two players to accomplish this. Morris was named the Western Conference Player of the Week for the November 4–11, 2013 period after averaging 22.8 points, 8.0 rebounds, 2.0 steals and leading the league for field goal percentage (.698). Morris had 27 points and grab 15 rebounds in a 99–90 victory over the Cleveland Cavaliers, making Morris the first player since Yao Ming in 2002 to score at least 27 points and grab 15 rebounds off the bench. Because of his improvements throughout the 2013–14 NBA season as a sixth man, Morris ended up being a candidate for both the NBA Most Improved Player Award and the NBA Sixth Man of the Year Award.

==== 2014–15 season ====
On September 29, 2014, Morris signed a multi-year contract extension with the Suns. On November 17, 2014, he recorded a then career-high 30 points in the 118–114 victory over the Boston Celtics. He and Marcus, alongside teammates Goran and Zoran Dragić, all briefly played together for the Suns during the fourth quarter of their 112–96 victory over the Philadelphia 76ers on January 2, 2015. It marked the first time in the NBA's history that two different pairs of brothers played together for the same team at the same time. On January 13, 2015, Morris scored a career-high 35 points on 15-of-21 shooting in a 107–100 victory over the Cleveland Cavaliers. In a game against the Dallas Mavericks on March 22, the Morris twins both had double-doubles in the same game for the first time in their careers.

==== 2015–16 season ====
On September 8, 2015, Morris was fined $10,000 for conduct detrimental to the league by publicly demanding a trade a month earlier. He later trained with long-time friend Rasheed Wallace prior to re-joining the Suns for training camp. On November 23, Morris scored a then season-high 28 points in a loss to the San Antonio Spurs. He started in 16 games to start the season before being benched by coach Jeff Hornacek from December 4 onwards. During the fourth quarter of the Suns' December 23 game against the Denver Nuggets, Morris threw a towel in the direction of Hornacek as he was heading to the bench. The following day, Morris was suspended for two games for conduct detrimental to the team, and was later labelled one of Arizona's biggest sports villains by AZCentral.com. Following an injury to teammate Alex Len in early January, Morris was reinserted back in the rotation to help fortify the frontcourt. On February 2, 2016, during Earl Watson's first game as head coach for the Suns, he had a season-best game with 30 points, 11 rebounds, six assists, two blocks, and a steal in a 104–97 loss to the Toronto Raptors. Four days later, Morris recorded 17 points and a career-high eight assists in a loss to the Utah Jazz. In his final game with the Suns on February 10 against the Golden State Warriors, Morris and teammate Archie Goodwin got into a physical altercation on the bench and were seen arguing during a timeout. The argument escalated into a shoving match between the pair, as teammates quickly stepped in and separated the two.

=== Washington Wizards (2016–2019) ===
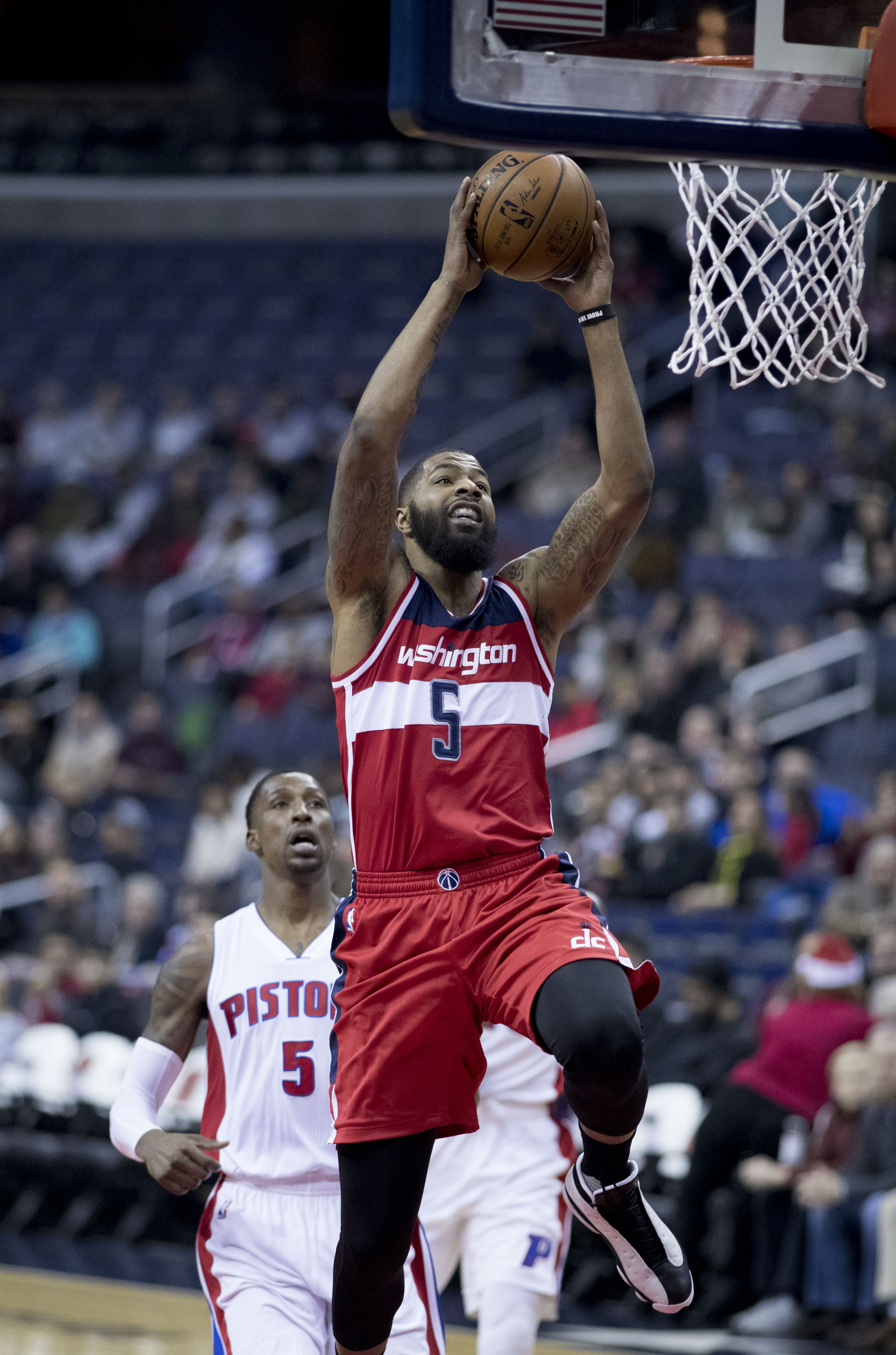
Morris in 2016

On February 18, 2016, Morris was traded to the Washington Wizards in exchange for DeJuan Blair, Kris Humphries and a 2016 Top–9 protected first-round draft pick. The next day, he made his debut for the Wizards in a 98–86 victory over his brother's team, the Detroit Pistons, recording six points and two rebounds in 22 minutes. On February 29, 2016, Morris recorded his first double-double as a Wizard with 16 points and 13 rebounds in a 116–108 win over the Philadelphia 76ers.

On February 10, 2017, Morris scored a season-high 26 points in a 112–107 victory over the Indiana Pacers. The Wizards finished the regular season with a 49–33 record and entered the playoffs as the No. 4 seed. They subsequently won their first Southeast Division title since 1978–79. On April 16, 2017, Morris scored 21 points in his NBA playoff debut as the Wizards defeated the Atlanta Hawks 114–107 in Game 1 of their first-round series.

On September 22, 2017, Morris was ruled out for six to eight weeks after undergoing surgery to repair a sports hernia. On March 13, 2018, he scored a season-high 27 points in a 116–111 loss to the Minnesota Timberwolves.

On January 3, 2019, Morris was ruled out for six weeks following a bout of neck and upper back stiffness that led to him being diagnosed with transient cervical neurapraxia.

On February 7, 2019, Morris was traded, along with a 2023 second-round pick, to the New Orleans Pelicans in exchange for Wesley Johnson. He was waived by the Pelicans the following day.

=== Oklahoma City Thunder (2019) ===
On February 20, 2019, Morris signed with the Oklahoma City Thunder.

=== Detroit Pistons (2019–2020) ===
On July 6, 2019, Morris signed with the Detroit Pistons. On February 21, 2020, Morris and the Pistons agreed to a buyout.

=== Los Angeles Lakers (2020–2021) ===
Morris was signed by the Los Angeles Lakers on February 23, 2020, using the $1.75 million disabled player exemption they were granted to replace DeMarcus Cousins. The Lakers advanced in the playoffs to the conference semifinals against Houston. In a Game 2 win, off the bench, Morris contributed 16 points in 23 minutes and shot 6-of-8 from the field and 4-of-5 from beyond the arc. In the second half of Game 3, Lakers head coach Frank Vogel countered the Rockets small-ball lineup by starting Morris in place of JaVale McGee and moving Anthony Davis to center. Morris remained a starter for the remainder of the series, which the Lakers won 4–1. The Lakers won the 2020 NBA Finals in six games, earning Morris his first championship. He re-signed with the Lakers for the 2020–21 season.

=== Miami Heat (2021–2022) ===
On August 6, 2021, Morris signed a one-year, veteran's minimum contract with the Miami Heat.

Morris was fined $50,000 for initiating an altercation by hitting Nikola Jokić in a game against the Denver Nuggets on November 8, 2021. Morris suffered a neck injury during the altercation after Jokić shoved him from behind, and Morris was later diagnosed with whiplash. On March 11, 2022, he received medical clearance to return to playing.

=== Brooklyn Nets (2022–2023) ===
On September 7, 2022, Morris signed with the Brooklyn Nets.

=== Dallas Mavericks (2023–2025) ===
Morris, along with Kyrie Irving, was traded to the Dallas Mavericks on February 6, 2023, in exchange for Dorian Finney-Smith, Spencer Dinwiddie, an unprotected 2029 first-round pick, and second-round picks in 2027 and 2029. He was re-signed on September 16. Morris reached the 2024 NBA Finals where the Mavericks lost to the Boston Celtics in five games. On September 11, 2024, Morris re-signed with the Mavericks.

=== Return to the Lakers (2025) ===
On February 2, 2025, Morris was traded, alongside Luka Dončić and Maxi Kleber, to the Los Angeles Lakers in exchange for Max Christie, Anthony Davis and a 2029 first-round pick. The Lakers also traded Jalen Hood-Schifino and a 2025 second round pick to the Utah Jazz, who also acquired a 2025 second-round pick from the Mavericks.

== Career statistics ==
Legend
GP	Games played	GS	Games started	MPG	Minutes per game
FG%	Field goal percentage	3P%	3-point field goal percentage	FT%	Free throw percentage
RPG	Rebounds per game	APG	Assists per game	SPG	Steals per game
BPG	Blocks per game	PPG	Points per game	**Bold**	Career high
†	Won an NBA championship	*	Led the league

=== NBA ===
==== Regular season ====
Year	Team	GP	GS	MPG	FG%	3P%	FT%	RPG	APG	SPG	BPG	PPG
2011–12	Phoenix	63	7	19.5	.399	.347	.717	4.4	1.0	.7	.7	7.4
2012–13	Phoenix	**82***	32	22.4	.407	.336	.732	4.8	1.3	.9	**.8**	8.2
2013–14	Phoenix	81	0	26.6	**.486**	.315	.792	6.0	1.8	.8	.6	13.8
2014–15	Phoenix	**82**	**82***	**31.5**	.465	.318	.763	6.2	2.3	**1.2**	.5	**15.3**
2015–16	Phoenix	37	24	24.8	.397	.289	.717	5.2	**2.4**	.9	.5	11.6
2015–16	Washington	27	21	26.4	.467	.316	.764	5.9	1.4	.9	.6	12.4
2016–17	Washington	76	76	31.2	.457	.362	.837	**6.5**	1.7	1.1	.6	14.0
2017–18	Washington	73	73	27.0	.480	.367	.820	5.6	1.9	.8	.5	11.5
2018–19	Washington	34	15	26.0	.436	.333	.781	5.1	1.8	.7	.6	11.5
2018–19	Oklahoma City	24	1	16.1	.391	.339	.737	3.8	.8	.5	.1	6.5
2019–20	Detroit	44	16	22.5	.450	.397	.772	3.9	1.6	.6	.3	11.0
2019–20†	L.A. Lakers	14	1	14.2	.406	.333	.833	3.2	.6	.4	.4	5.3
2020–21	L.A. Lakers	61	27	19.7	.405	.311	.720	4.4	1.2	.4	.3	6.7
2021–22	Miami	17	1	17.5	.474	.333	.889	2.6	1.4	.4	.1	7.6
2022–23	Brooklyn	27	1	10.6	.402	**.408**	**1.000**	2.2	.9	.3	.2	3.6
2022–23	Dallas	8	1	8.7	.424	.364	—	1.5	.8	.1	.0	4.5
2023–24	Dallas	26	1	8.3	.338	.357	.833	1.5	.6	.2	.1	2.5
2024–25	Dallas	7	0	5.9	.227	.154	—	1.1	.6	.1	.1	1.7
2024–25	L.A. Lakers	8	2	15.5	.333	.304	.833	1.9	2.1	.1	.3	5.5
Career		791	381	23.3	.443	.341	.779	4.9	1.5	.8	.5	10.2

==== Playoffs ====
Year	Team	GP	GS	MPG	FG%	3P%	FT%	RPG	APG	SPG	BPG	PPG
2017	Washington	13	**13**	28.7	.407	.368	.806	6.3	**1.7**	**.9**	**1.3**	**12.1**
2018	Washington	6	6	**30.2**	**.490**	.167	**.900**	**7.5**	**1.7**	.7	.8	9.8
2019	Oklahoma City	5	0	11.8	.313	.286	.778	2.6	1.0	.2	.6	3.8
2020†	L.A. Lakers	**21**	2	18.4	.449	**.420**	.778	3.0	1.0	.3	.1	5.9
2021	L.A. Lakers	4	1	9.5	.222	.250	.667	1.0	.8	.0	.3	2.3
2022	Miami	1	0	3.5	.000	—	—	1.0	.0	.0	.0	.0
2024	Dallas	1	0	12.0	.200	.333	—	4.0	.0	.0	.0	3.0
Career		51	22	20.6	.418	.368	.800	4.2	1.2	.5	.6	7.3

=== College ===
Year	Team	GP	GS	MPG	FG%	3P%	FT%	RPG	APG	SPG	BPG	PPG
2008–09	Kansas	35	7	15.6	.448	.188	.650	4.4	1.0	.4	.7	4.6
2009–10	Kansas	36	2	17.6	.566	**.526**	.622	5.3	1.1	.4	1.0	6.8
2010–11	Kansas	**38**	**35**	**24.4**	**.589**	.424	**.673**	**8.3**	**1.4**	**.8**	**1.1**	**13.6**
Career		109	43	19.3	.553	.404	.653	6.1	1.2	.6	.9	8.5

== Personal life ==
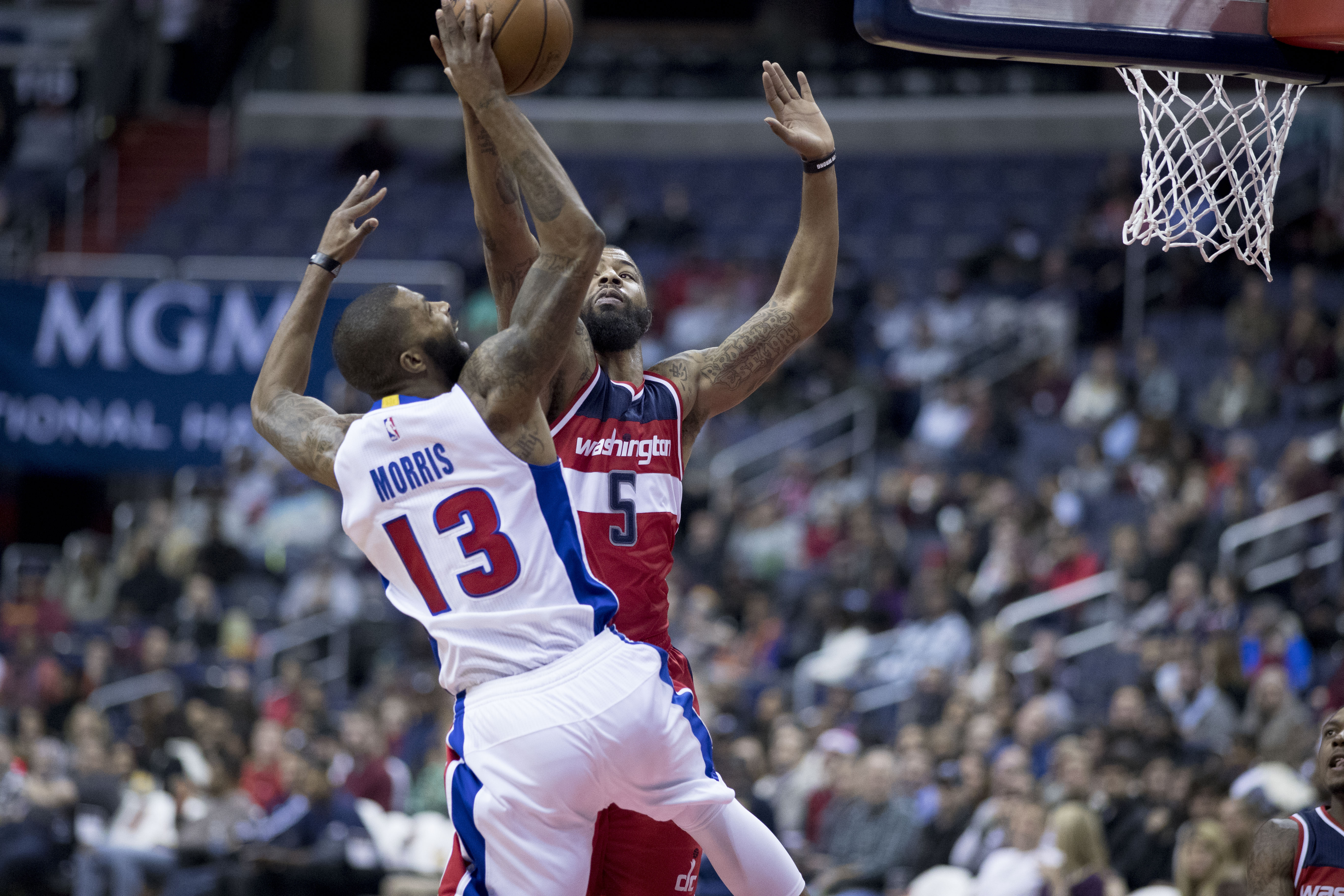
Morris (right) and his brother Marcus Morris Sr., 2016

Morris is seven minutes older than his fraternal twin brother Marcus. He is a fan of the Dallas Cowboys, while Marcus is a fan of the Philadelphia Eagles. His nickname is "Keef."

On January 24, 2015, both Markieff and Marcus Morris found themselves involved with two aggravated assault cases as five different men (including the twins and former Baltimore Ravens safety Gerald Bowman) allegedly assaulted a 36-year-old man named Eric Hood outside of the Nina Mason Pulliam Recreation Center in Phoenix, Arizona. Hood had previously mentored the Morris twins from high school until the end of their college careers, while the brothers would beat Hood up for "sending an inappropriate text message" to their mother. While the case against the Morris brothers was first set up during the summer of 2015, the trial for the twins concluded on October 2, 2017, with both the twins and Gerald Bowman declared as not guilty, while the other people involved (Julius Kane and Christopher Melendez Jr.) confessed their guilt in September 2017. Even with their apparent innocence, the incident was not only considered a catalyst for the Suns to trade Marcus to the Detroit Pistons on July 9, 2015; but it was also one of the biggest reasons why the Suns traded Markieff to the Wizards over eight months later on February 18, 2016.

Morris and his wife, Thereza Wright-Morris, have a daughter. The Morris twins helped create the Family Over Everything Foundation, an organization that assists members of under-served communities in Philadelphia and other cities.
