= 2012–13 Phoenix Suns season =

Professional basketball season

- Head coach: Alvin Gentry; Lindsey Hunter (interim)
- General manager: Lance Blanks
- Owners: Robert Sarver
- Arena: US Airways Center

Results
- Record: 25–57 (.305)
- Place: Division: 5th (Pacific); Conference: 15th (Western)
- Playoff finish: Did not qualify
- Stats at Basketball Reference

Local media
- Television: Fox Sports Arizona
- Radio: KTAR

The 2012–13 Phoenix Suns season was the organization's 45th season in the National Basketball Association. This season was the first since the 2003–04 season that the Suns were without star point guard and former two-time MVP Steve Nash after Nash was sign-and-traded to the rival Los Angeles Lakers. Another fan favorite, Grant Hill, also left for Los Angeles in this season, but he would sign with the Los Angeles Clippers. By technicality, the player who held the most playing experience for the Suns this season was Jermaine O'Neal.

== Key dates ==
- June 28, 2012: The 2012 NBA draft took place at the Prudential Center in Newark, New Jersey.
- July 1, 2012: The NBA free agency has begun.
- July 4, 2012: The Suns do a sign-and-trade with the Los Angeles Lakers to exchange star point guard Steve Nash for two first round Lakers draft picks in 2013 (from the Miami Heat via the L.A. Lakers) and 2018 (due to 2015 having Top–5 protection and both 2016 & 2017 having Top-3 protection), as well as two second-round picks in 2013 (from the Denver Nuggets via the L.A. Lakers) and 2014 (which eventually got traded to the Minnesota Timberwolves); Phoenix also signed forward Michael Beasley and re-signed their former back-up point guard Goran Dragić.
- July 11, 2012: Teams can officially sign, trade, and even amnesty players to their liking.
- July 15, 2012: The Suns used their amnesty clause on Josh Childress; Phoenix also officially sign former Houston Rockets players Goran Dragić & Luis Scola.
- July 20, 2012: The Suns officially sign Michael Beasley and re-sign Shannon Brown.
- July 24, 2012: The Suns sign Summer League standout P. J. Tucker.
- July 27, 2012: The Suns agree to a three-way trade with the New Orleans Hornets and the Minnesota Timberwolves. The Suns would send Robin Lopez and Hakim Warrick to the New Orleans Hornets and the Lakers' 2014 second-round pick to the Minnesota Timberwolves, and they receive the contracts of Brad Miller and Jerome Dyson from the Hornets, as well as Wesley Johnson and a protected future first-round draft pick from the Timberwolves.
- August 15, 2012: The Suns officially sign Jermaine O'Neal for one year, as well as waive the contracts of both Jerome Dyson & Brad Miller; Miller would officially retire a few weeks later.
- September 20, 2012: Channing Frye was confirmed to miss all of this season due to an enlarged heart via dilated cardiomyopathy.
- October 31, 2012: The regular season for the Suns begins.
- January 18, 2013: Coach Alvin Gentry ended up resigning from head coaching duties.
- January 20, 2013: Lindsey Hunter is announced as the new interim head coach for the Suns; assistant coach Sean Rooks resigns from his coaching duties.
- January 21, 2013: Assistant head coach and Suns fan favorite Dan Majerle resigns from his assistant head coaching duties; Phoenix Mercury head coach Corey Gaines becomes assistant head coach for the rest of the season.
- January 23, 2013: Defensive assistant head coach Elston Turner resigns from his assistant head coaching duties; former Phoenix Suns scout and Shanghai Sharks head coach Dan Panaggio becomes assistant head coach for the rest of the season.
- February 20, 2013: The Suns trade their own 2013 second-round pick to the Houston Rockets in exchange for Marcus Morris, the twin brother of Suns power forward Markieff Morris. Phoenix also waives forward-center Luke Zeller.
- February 21, 2013: The Suns trade Sebastian Telfair to the Toronto Raptors in exchange for Hamed Haddadi and a 2014 second-round pick (worst selection between the Raptors and the Sacramento Kings).

== Offseason ==
=== NBA draft ===
Round	Pick	Player	Position	Nationality	College
1	13	Kendall Marshall	Point guard	United States	North Carolina

The Suns will once again only have pick 13 as their only first-round draft pick. The Suns used their only pick to select point guard Kendall Marshall from North Carolina. Marshall was a prolific passer, averaging 8.1 points and 9.8 assists in his last season with the Tar Heels. He also set the ACC & University of North Carolina season assist records, as well as winning the Bob Cousy Award for his performance in his sophomore year. Unfortunately, Marshall would retire from the league after playing for five years in the league. As for their second-round pick, it was traded to the Atlanta Hawks for Josh Childress via sign and trade. That selection became Mike Scott, who eventually came to Phoenix himself for a couple of days in 2017

=== Free agency ===
Veteran players Grant Hill and Steve Nash, as well as the newly signed Shannon Brown, Michael Redd, and Ronnie Price have all become unrestricted free agents as of the end of the 2011–12 NBA season. Center Robin Lopez has become a restricted free agent as of the end of the season as well. In a unique situation, former CBA player Aaron Brooks is still a restricted free agent, but due to his signing with the Guangdong Southern Tigers and the Suns not re-signing Brooks to a new contract during the 2011–12 NBA season, he'll be a restricted free agent with restricted benefits. For example, the Suns can match any offer that they see fit, but they cannot do any sign-and-trades whatsoever with him. However, Phoenix was unlikely to bring back Aaron Brooks to a restricted free agent offer, so they made him unrestricted after trying to get Eric Gordon. In addition, the Suns may also use their amnesty clause to get rid of a player that they see is holding them back. However, they have to use it a week after the July moratorium (July 11); otherwise, the amnesty clause stays with the team until at least next season.

On July 3, 2012, Eric Gordon agreed to a tentative deal with the Suns for 4 years and $58 million. However, despite Gordon saying that "Phoenix is where my heart is now", since Gordon's a restricted free agent, his offer was matched by the New Orleans Hornets a full three days after signing free agents officially took place. Phoenix has, however, gained both former back-up point guard Goran Dragić and forward Michael Beasley as of July 4, 2012. As for Steve Nash, he was officially traded to the rival Los Angeles Lakers in exchange for first and second-round draft picks in the 2013 draft, as well as a first-round pick in the 2015 draft and a second-round pick in the 2014 draft on July 4 as well. Grant Hill also went to Los Angeles, but he went to play for the Los Angeles Clippers on July 18, 2012. Ronnie Price would sign with the Portland Trail Blazers on July 18 as well; however, unlike Grant Hill, Ronnie Price would be waived by Portland on February 21, 2013. Aaron Brooks would go to the Sacramento Kings on July 16, 2012, but he would play for them until March 1, 2013. Four days later, Brooks decided to officially sign with his former team, the Houston Rockets, which tended to reverse Phoenix and Houston's trade in 2011 that had Goran Dragić going to Houston and Brooks going to Phoenix. The last player that became a free agent, Michael Redd, ended up retiring in November 2013.

On July 15, 2012, a day after Eric Gordon's contract was matched by the Hornets, the Suns ended up placing a winning bid on former Houston Rockets power forward Luis Scola, as well as used their amnesty clause on Josh Childress, who would eventually sign with the Brooklyn Nets until December 29, 2012. On July 25, 2012, the Suns agreed to re-sign Shannon Brown, as well as sign former Texas University standout P. J. Tucker and produce a three-way trade with the New Orleans Hornets and the Minnesota Timberwolves. Two days later, the Suns exchanged Robin Lopez and Hakim Warrick to the Hornets and the Lakers' 2014 second-round pick to the Timberwolves for Brad Miller's expiring contract and Jerome Dyson's non-guaranteed contract from the Hornets, as well as Wesley Johnson and a lottery protected 2013 first-round draft pick that will stay in the first round until 2016 from the Timberwolves, which would then turn into two second-round picks in 2016 and 2017. On August 15, 2012, the Suns decided to waive Jerome Dyson and Brad Miller's contracts and sign a one-year deal for Jermaine O'Neal. Former Suns player Leandro Barbosa considered playing for the Suns again, as well as the Los Angeles Lakers and the Brooklyn Nets, before officially signing with the Boston Celtics on October 17, 2012. Luke Zeller and Diante Garrett were initially announced as training camp invitees on October 1. However, due to the heart condition involving Channing Frye, both players ended up making the team. Other players announced as possible candidates that day include Othyus Jeffers, Solomon Jones, and Ike Diogu.

=== Coaching changes ===
Before the 2011–12 NBA season officially ended, Bill Cartwright had announced that he will not be returning as an assistant head coach to the Phoenix Suns. In July 2012, Elston Turner had competed for the head coach spot for the Portland Trail Blazers. Ultimately, he was not hired, and he stayed as an assistant coach for at least the start of the season. On August 28, 2012, the Suns hired Lindsey Hunter as an initial assistant head coach for player development. On October 4, 2012, the Suns also added both Sean Rooks and Basketball Hall of Famer Ralph Sampson as assistants for player development as well. Phoenix Mercury head coach Corey Gaines has also gained an assistant head coach role for player development later on in the season as well. The same thing would also be said for Dan Panaggio later on in 2013 as well.

On January 18, 2013, head coach Alvin Gentry was fired from head coaching duties. Gentry's firing came right after the Suns' worst opening stint in 28 years. Two days later, the Suns announced that Lindsey Hunter would surprisingly take on the role of interim head coach for the Suns instead of either Dan Majerle or Elston Turner throughout the remainder of the season. It was also announced that Sean Rooks would resign from his developmental coaching duties. A day later, Suns fan favorite Dan Majerle announced that he would resign from his assistant head coaching duties. Two days later, defensive assistant head coach Elston Turner announced his resignation from his duties as well. Because of their resignations, Phoenix Mercury head coach Corey Gaines gained a more permanent assistant coaching role for at least the rest of the season. In addition, former Suns scout and Shanghai Sharks head coach Dan Panaggio from the Chinese Basketball Association ended up becoming a new assistant head coach.

== Roster ==
2012–13 Phoenix Suns roster
Players

Pos.	No.	Player	Height	Weight	DOB	From
F	0	Michael Beasley	6 ft 10 in (2.08 m)	235 lb (107 kg)	1989–01–09	Kansas State
G	26	Shannon Brown	6 ft 4 in (1.93 m)	210 lb (95 kg)	1985–11–29	Michigan State
G	1	Goran Dragić	6 ft 3 in (1.91 m)	190 lb (86 kg)	1986–05–06	Slovenia
F	3	Jared Dudley	6 ft 7 in (2.01 m)	225 lb (102 kg)	1985–07–10	Boston College
F	8	Channing Frye (injured)	7 ft 0 in (2.13 m)	255 lb (116 kg)	1983–05–17	Arizona
G	10	Diante Garrett (DL)	6 ft 4 in (1.93 m)	190 lb (86 kg)	1988–11–03	Iowa State
C	4	Marcin Gortat	6 ft 11 in (2.11 m)	240 lb (109 kg)	1984–02–17	Poland
C	98	Hamed Haddadi	7 ft 2 in (2.18 m)	265 lb (120 kg)	1985–05–19	Iran
G/F	2	Wesley Johnson	6 ft 7 in (2.01 m)	215 lb (98 kg)	1987–07–11	Syracuse
G	12	Kendall Marshall	6 ft 4 in (1.93 m)	195 lb (88 kg)	1991–08–19	North Carolina
F	15	Marcus Morris	6 ft 10 in (2.08 m)	235 lb (107 kg)	1989–09–02	Kansas
F	11	Markieff Morris	6 ft 10 in (2.08 m)	245 lb (111 kg)	1989–09–02	Kansas
C	20	Jermaine O'Neal	6 ft 11 in (2.11 m)	255 lb (116 kg)	1978–10–13	Eau Claire HS (SC)
F	14	Luis Scola	6 ft 9 in (2.06 m)	245 lb (111 kg)	1980–04–30	Argentina
F	17	P. J. Tucker	6 ft 6 in (1.98 m)	224 lb (102 kg)	1985–05–05	Texas

Coaches
Head coach
- Alvin Gentry
- Lindsey Hunter (interim)
Assistant(s)
- Igor Kokoškov
- Ralph Sampson
- Corey Gaines
- Noel Gillespie
- Dan Panaggio

Legend
- (DP) Unsigned draft pick
- (FA) Free agent
- (S) Suspended
- (DL) On assignment to D-League affiliate
- Injured

=== Salaries ===
Player	2012–13 Salary
Goran Dragić	$7,500,000
Marcin Gortat	$7,258,960
Channing Frye	$6,000,000
Michael Beasley	$5,750,000
Luis Scola	$4,500,000
Wesley Johnson	$4,285,560
Jared Dudley	$4,250,000
Shannon Brown	$3,500,000
Markieff Morris	$2,063,040
Marcus Morris	$1,959,960
Kendall Marshall	$1,919,160
Jermaine O'Neal	$1,352,181
Hamed Haddadi	$1,300,000
P. J. Tucker	$762,195
Diante Garrett	$473,604
TOTAL	$51,655,804

Because the Suns decided to amnesty Josh Childress' contract, he still gets paid the $6,500,000 that he would have been owed had he played for the Suns this season. While he still gets paid money out of being amnestied from the team for two more seasons, his salary does not actually affect the Suns' actual salary cap. In addition, since Brad Miller's contract guaranteed him around $850,000 this season, he was paid that salary despite being waived by the team and retiring in the process. Also, because Luke Zeller was waived from the team after January 10, 2013, came to fruition, his rookie salary of $473,604 ended up being counted by the Suns' salary cap as well since his contract was guaranteed by that point of the season.

== Pre-season ==
=== Game log ===
2012 pre-season game log
Pre-season: 4–3 (home: 3–0; road: 1–3)

Game	Date	Team	Score	High points	High rebounds	High assists	Location Attendance	Record
1	October 10	@ Sacramento	L 96–102	Wesley Johnson (18)	Marcin Gortat, Markieff Morris, P. J. Tucker (7)	Michael Beasley (5)	Power Balance Pavilion	0–1
2	October 12	Portland	W 104–93	Markieff Morris (14)	Marcin Gortat (8)	Goran Dragić (9)	US Airways Center	1–1
3	October 17	@ Dallas	W 100–94	Jared Dudley (16)	Marcin Gortat, Markieff Morris (6)	Goran Dragić (6)	American Airlines Center	2–1
4	October 19	@ Oklahoma City	L 97–107	Wesley Johnson (15)	Solomon Jones (10)	Diante Garrett (5)	BOK Center	2–2
5	October 22	Sacramento	W 103–88	Jared Dudley (25)	Marcin Gortat (12)	Goran Dragić (6)	US Airways Center	3–2
6	October 23	@ Golden State	L 92–107	Marcin Gortat (19)	Marcin Gortat (10)	Goran Dragić (6)	Oracle Arena	3–3
7	October 26	Denver	W 88–72	Michael Beasley (29)	Michael Beasley (10)	Goran Dragić (6)	US Airways Center	4–3

2012–13 season schedule

== Regular season ==
=== Standings ===
Pacific Division	W	L	PCT	GB	Home	Road	Div	GP
y-Los Angeles Clippers	56	26	.683	–	32–9	24–17	11–5	82
x-Golden State Warriors	47	35	.573	9	28–13	19–22	9–7	82
x-Los Angeles Lakers	45	37	.549	11	29–12	16–25	8–8	82
Sacramento Kings	28	54	.341	28	20–21	8–33	7–9	82
Phoenix Suns	25	57	.305	31	17–24	8–33	5–11	82

Western Conference
#	Team	W	L	PCT	GB	GP
1	c-Oklahoma City Thunder *	60	22	.732	–	82
2	y-San Antonio Spurs *	58	24	.707	2.0	82
3	x-Denver Nuggets *	57	25	.695	3.0	82
4	y-Los Angeles Clippers	56	26	.683	4.0	82
5	x-Memphis Grizzlies	56	26	.683	4.0	82
6	x-Golden State Warriors	47	35	.573	13.0	82
7	x-Los Angeles Lakers	45	37	.549	15.0	82
8	x-Houston Rockets	45	37	.549	15.0	82
9	Utah Jazz	43	39	.524	17.0	82
10	Dallas Mavericks	41	41	.500	19.0	82
11	Portland Trail Blazers	33	49	.402	27.0	82
12	Minnesota Timberwolves	31	51	.378	29.0	82
13	Sacramento Kings	28	54	.341	32.0	82
14	New Orleans Hornets	27	55	.329	33.0	82
15	Phoenix Suns	25	57	.305	35.0	82

=== Game log ===
2012–13 game log
Total: 25–57 (Home: 17–24; Road: 8–33)
October: 0–1 (home: 0–1; road: 0–0)

Game	Date	Team	Score	High points	High rebounds	High assists	Location Attendance	Record
1	October 31	Golden State	L 85–87	Goran Dragić (17)	Luis Scola (11)	Goran Dragić (8)	US Airways Center; 15,678	0–1

November : 7–9 (home: 5–2; road: 2–7)

Game	Date	Team	Score	High points	High rebounds	High assists	Location Attendance	Record
2	November 2	Detroit	W 92–89	Michael Beasley, Marcin Gortat (16)	Marcin Gortat (16)	Goran Dragić (10)	US Airways Center; 15,107	1–1
3	November 4	@ Orlando	L 94–115	Luis Scola (24)	Marcin Gortat (11)	Goran Dragić (8)	Amway Center; 17,022	1–2
4	November 5	@ Miami	L 99–124	Shannon Brown (18)	Marcin Gortat (13)	Goran Dragić (9)	American Airlines Arena; 19,600	1–3
5	November 7	@ Charlotte	W 117–110	Shannon Brown (24)	Michael Beasley (15)	Goran Dragić (8)	Time Warner Cable Arena; 13,905	2–3
6	November 9	Cleveland	W 107–105	Goran Dragić (26)	Marcin Gortat (8)	Michael Beasley (5)	US Airways Center; 15,236	3–3
7	November 10	@ Utah	L 81–94	Luis Scola (21)	Luis Scola (11)	Goran Dragić (6)	EnergySolutions Arena; 19,100	3–4
8	November 12	Denver	W 110–100	Goran Dragić (26)	Marcin Gortat (11)	Goran Dragić (7)	US Airways Center; 14,060	4–4
9	November 14	Chicago	L 106–112 (OT)	Luis Scola (24)	Luis Scola (14)	Goran Dragić (5)	US Airways Center; 15,305	4–5
10	November 16	@ L.A. Lakers	L 102–114	Goran Dragić (22)	Marcin Gortat, Luis Scola (8)	Michael Beasley (9)	Staples Center; 18,997	4–6
11	November 17	Miami	L 88–97	Markieff Morris (16)	Michael Beasley (8)	Goran Dragić (8)	US Airways Center; 16,840	4–7
12	November 21	Portland	W 114–87	Marcin Gortat (22)	Marcin Gortat, Markieff Morris (7)	Goran Dragić (8)	US Airways Center; 14,263	5–7
13	November 23	New Orleans	W 111–108 (OT)	Markieff Morris (23)	Jermaine O'Neal (11)	Goran Dragić (8)	US Airways Center; 14,020	6–7
14	November 25	@ Philadelphia	L 101–104	Michael Beasley (21)	Markieff Morris (10)	Shannon Brown (7)	Wells Fargo Center; 14,518	6–8
15	November 27	@ Cleveland	W 91–78	Goran Dragić (19)	Jermaine O'Neal (6)	Goran Dragić (7)	Quicken Loans Arena; 13,687	7–8
16	November 28	@ Detroit	L 77–117	Luis Scola (11)	Jermaine O'Neal (7)	Wesley Johnson (3)	The Palace of Auburn Hills; 10,517	7–9
17	November 30	@ Toronto	L 97–101	Shannon Brown, Jared Dudley, Marcin Gortat (14)	Marcin Gortat (6)	Michael Beasley (6)	Air Canada Centre; 18,246	7–10

December : 4–11 (home: 4–4; road: 0–7)

Game	Date	Team	Score	High points	High rebounds	High assists	Location Attendance	Record
18	December 2	@ New York	L 99–106	Marcin Gortat (18)	Marcin Gortat (10)	Goran Dragić (5)	Madison Square Garden; 19,033	7–11
19	December 4	@ Memphis	L 98–108 (OT)	Goran Dragić (19)	Luis Scola (8)	Goran Dragić (7)	FedExForum; 14,481	7–12
20	December 6	Dallas	L 94–97	Goran Dragić, Markieff Morris (15)	Markieff Morris (17)	Goran Dragić (4)	US Airways Center; 14,481	7–13
21	December 8	@ L.A. Clippers	L 99–117	Michael Beasley (21)	Luis Scola (10)	Michael Beasley, Goran Dragić (5)	Staples Center; 19,060	7–14
22	December 9	Orlando	L 90–98	Shannon Brown (17)	Marcin Gortat (6)	Sebastian Telfair (8)	US Airways Center; 13,565	7–15
23	December 12	Memphis	W 82–80	Shannon Brown, Jared Dudley (15)	Jared Dudley (9)	Goran Dragić (8)	US Airways Center; 13,093	8–15
24	December 14	Utah	W 99–84	Jared Dudley (22)	Marcin Gortat (14)	Goran Dragić, Jared Dudley (5)	US Airways Center; 14,182	9–15
25	December 17	Sacramento	W 101–90	Shannon Brown (22)	Marcin Gortat (13)	Luis Scola (10)	US Airways Center; 13,068	10–15
26	December 19	Charlotte	W 121–104	Shannon Brown (26)	Marcin Gortat (9)	Goran Dragić (11)	US Airways Center; 13,308	11–15
27	December 22	@ Portland	L 93–96	Marcin Gortat (18)	Marcin Gortat (9)	Jared Dudley (10)	Rose Garden; 19,746	11–16
28	December 23	L.A. Clippers	L 77–103	Jared Dudley (19)	Marcin Gortat (12)	Shannon Brown (6)	US Airways Center; 14,741	11–17
29	December 26	New York	L 97–99	Jared Dudley (36)	Marcin Gortat (9)	Shannon Brown, Sebastian Telfair (4)	US Airways Center; 15,153	11–18
30	December 28	@ Indiana	L 91–97	Sebastian Telfair (19)	Marcin Gortat (10)	Sebastian Telfair (6)	Bankers Life Fieldhouse; 15,288	11–19
31	December 29	@ Minnesota	L 107–111	Luis Scola (33)	Luis Scola (10)	Goran Dragić (12)	Target Center; 19,356	11–20
32	December 31	@ Oklahoma City	L 96–114	Luis Scola (24)	Marcin Gortat (10)	Goran Dragić (8)	Chesapeake Energy Arena; 18,203	11–21

January : 5–9 (home: 3–4; road: 2–5)

Game	Date	Team	Score	High points	High rebounds	High assists	Location Attendance	Record
33	January 2	Philadelphia	W 95–89	Luis Scola (21)	Marcin Gortat (14)	Luis Scola (9)	US Airways Center; 16,034	12–21
34	January 4	Utah	L 80–87	Marcin Gortat (18)	Marcin Gortat (11)	Goran Dragić (6)	US Airways Center; 14,874	12–22
35	January 6	Memphis	L 81–92	P. J. Tucker (17)	Marcin Gortat (8)	Goran Dragić, Luis Scola (6)	US Airways Center; 13,197	12–23
36	January 8	@ Milwaukee	L 99–108	Goran Dragić (21)	Marcin Gortat (14)	Jared Dudley (8)	Bradley Center; 13,014	12–24
37	January 9	@ Boston	L 79–87	Luis Scola (16)	Marcin Gortat (14)	Jared Dudley (5)	TD Garden; 18,624	12–25
38	January 11	@ Brooklyn	L 79–99	Jared Dudley (18)	Marcin Gortat, P. J. Tucker (8)	Shannon Brown, Jared Dudley (4)	Barclays Center; 16,272	12–26
39	January 12	@ Chicago	W 97–81	Luis Scola (22)	Marcin Gortat (10)	Goran Dragić (8)	United Center; 21,874	13–26
40	January 14	Oklahoma City	L 90–102	Shannon Brown (21)	Marcin Gortat (15)	Luis Scola (5)	US Airways Center; 14,951	13–27
41	January 17	Milwaukee	L 94–98	Shannon Brown (20)	Luis Scola (8)	Goran Dragić, Jared Dudley (4)	US Airways Center; 15,963	13–28
42	January 23	@ Sacramento	W 106–96	Luis Scola (21)	Luis Scola (7)	Goran Dragić (11)	Power Balance Pavilion; 12,741	14–28
43	January 24	L.A. Clippers	W 93–88	Goran Dragić (24)	Luis Scola (9)	Goran Dragić (8)	US Airways Center; 16,017	15–28
44	January 26	@ San Antonio	L 99–108	Jared Dudley (23)	Marcin Gortat (12)	Goran Dragić (10)	AT&T Center; 18,581	15–29
45	January 27	@ Dallas	L 95–110	Goran Dragić (18)	Marcin Gortat (8)	Goran Dragić (8)	American Airlines Center; 20,305	15–30
46	January 30	L.A. Lakers	W 92–86	Michael Beasley (27)	Marcin Gortat (12)	Goran Dragić (8)	US Airways Center; 17,184	16–30

February : 4–9 (home: 1–4; road: 3–5)

Game	Date	Team	Score	High points	High rebounds	High assists	Location Attendance	Record
47	February 1	Dallas	L 99–109	Shannon Brown (20)	Goran Dragić, Luis Scola, P. J. Tucker (8)	Goran Dragić (9)	US Airways Center; 16,304	16–31
48	February 2	@ Golden State	W 113–93	Michael Beasley (24)	Luis Scola (14)	Goran Dragić (7)	Oracle Arena; 19,596	16–32
49	February 5	@ Memphis	W 96–90	Marcin Gortat (20)	Marcin Gortat, Luis Scola, P. J. Tucker (7)	Goran Dragić, Kendall Marshall (4)	FedExForum; 14,933	17–32
50	February 6	@ New Orleans	L 84–93	Jared Dudley, Marcin Gortat (14)	Marcin Gortat (7)	Goran Dragić (6)	New Orleans Arena; 12,148	17–33
51	February 8	@ Oklahoma City	L 96–127	Michael Beasley (25)	Michael Beasley (7)	Goran Dragić (6)	Chesapeake Energy Arena; 18,203	17–34
52	February 10	Oklahoma City	L 69–97	Markieff Morris (12)	Michael Beasley, Jermaine O'Neal (8)	Goran Dragić (4)	US Airways Center; 16,773	17–35
53	February 12	@ L.A. Lakers	L 85–91	Michael Beasley (18)	Jermaine O'Neal (13)	Goran Dragić (6)	Staples Center; 18,997	17–36
All-Star Break
54	February 19	@ Portland	W 102–98	Luis Scola (18)	Jermaine O'Neal (13)	Goran Dragić (18)	Rose Garden; 20,499	18–36
55	February 20	@ Golden State	L 98–108	Goran Dragić (20)	Jermaine O'Neal (12)	Goran Dragić (10)	Oracle Arena; 19,596	18–37
56	February 22	Boston	L 88–113	Goran Dragić (19)	Marcin Gortat (6)	Goran Dragić (10)	US Airways Center; 18,422	18–38
57	February 24	San Antonio	L 87–97	Marcin Gortat (21)	Marcin Gortat (12)	Goran Dragić (11)	US Airways Center; 14,923	18–39
58	February 26	Minnesota	W 84–83 (OT)	Wesley Johnson, Markieff Morris, Marcin Gortat, (14)	Jermaine O'Neal (13)	Goran Dragić (7)	US Airways Center; 14,973	19–39
59	February 27	@ San Antonio	W 105–101 (OT)	Jermaine O'Neal (22)	Marcin Gortat (15)	Goran Dragić (13)	AT&T Center; 17,573	20–39

March : 3–12 (home: 3–7; road: 0–5)

Game	Date	Team	Score	High points	High rebounds	High assists	Location Attendance	Record
60	March 1	Atlanta	W 92–87	Goran Dragić (19)	Luis Scola (8)	Goran Dragić (6)	US Airways Center; 15,269	21–39
61	March 6	Toronto	L 71–98	Marcus Morris (12)	Luis Scola (8)	Goran Dragić (6)	US Airways Center; 13,173	21–40
62	March 8	@ Sacramento	L 112–121	Michael Beasley (24)	Luis Scola (9)	Goran Dragić (16)	Power Balance Pavilion; 13,501	21–41
63	March 9	Houston	W 107–105	Jared Dudley (22)	Hamed Haddadi (11)	Jared Dudley (7)	US Airways Center; 16,734	22–41
64	March 11	Denver	L 93–108	Wesley Johnson (18)	Luis Scola (13)	Goran Dragić (7)	US Airways Center; 15,597	22–42
65	March 13	@ Houston	L 81–111	Wesley Johnson (15)	Markieff Morris, Michael Beasley, Goran Dragić (5)	Kendall Marshall (6)	Toyota Center; 18,132	22–43
66	March 15	@ Atlanta	L 94–107	Goran Dragić (21)	Markieff Morris (11)	Goran Dragić (8)	Philips Arena; 14,282	22–44
67	March 16	@ Washington	L 105–127	Michael Beasley (21)	Markieff Morris, P. J. Tucker (9)	Goran Dragić (11)	Verizon Center; 16,882	22–45
68	March 18	L.A. Lakers	W 99–76	Luis Scola, Wesley Johnson (14)	Luis Scola, Wesley Johnson (9)	Goran Dragić (10)	US Airways Center; 17,102	23–45
69	March 20	Washington	L 79–88	Wesley Johnson (18)	P. J. Tucker (10)	Goran Dragić (11)	US Airways Center; 14,819	23–46
70	March 22	Minnesota	L 86–117	Luis Scola (17)	Luis Scola (12)	Goran Dragić (10)	US Airways Center; 16,155	23–47
71	March 24	Brooklyn	L 100–102	Goran Dragić (31)	Markieff Morris (15)	Goran Dragić (12)	US Airways Center	23–48
72	March 27	@ Utah	L 88–103	Wesley Johnson (22)	Luis Scola (7)	Kendall Marshall (13)	EnergySolutions Arena; 16,949	23–49
73	March 28	Sacramento	L 103–117	Luis Scola (25)	Michael Beasley (8)	Kendall Marshall (10)	US Airways Center; 15,086	23–50
74	March 30	Indiana	L 104–112	Goran Dragić (21)	Michael Beasley (6)	Goran Dragić (9)	US Airways Center; 17,090	23–51

April : 2–6 (home: 1–2; road: 1–4)

Game	Date	Team	Score	High points	High rebounds	High assists	Location Attendance	Record
75	April 3	@ L.A. Clippers	L 101–126	Wesley Johnson (20)	Luis Scola (11)	Goran Dragić (4)	Staples Center; 19,137	23–52
76	April 5	Golden State	L 107–111	Goran Dragić (32)	Jermaine O'Neal (9)	P. J. Tucker (6)	US Airways Center; 18,422	23–53
77	April 7	New Orleans	L 92–95	Markieff Morris (18)	Luis Scola (10)	Goran Dragić (8)	US Airways Center; 16,780	23–54
78	April 9	@ Houston	L 98–101	Luis Scola (28)	Markieff Morris (9)	Goran Dragić (8)	Toyota Center; 16,673	23–55
79	April 10	@ Dallas	W 102–91	Goran Dragić (21)	Luis Scola (15)	Goran Dragić (13)	American Airlines Center; 19,725	24–55
80	April 13	@ Minnesota	L 93–105	Markieff Morris (20)	Markieff Morris (9)	Goran Dragić (14)	Target Center; 16,701	24–56
81	April 15	Houston	W 119–112	Luis Scola (26)	Luis Scola (15)	Goran Dragić (14)	US Airways Center; 17,135	25–56
82	April 17	@ Denver	L 98–118	Luis Scola (17)	Luis Scola (11)	Kendall Marshall (14)	Pepsi Center; 17,539	25–57

2012–13 season schedule

== Player statistics ==
Legend
GP	Games played	GS	Games started	MPG	Minutes per game
FG%	Field-goal percentage	3P%	3-point field-goal percentage	FT%	Free-throw percentage
RPG	Rebounds per game	APG	Assists per game	SPG	Steals per game
BPG	Blocks per game	PPG	Points per game

=== Season ===
Player	GP	GS	MPG	FG%	3P%	FT%	RPG	APG	SPG	BPG	PPG
Michael Beasley	75	20	20.7	.405	.313	.746	3.8	1.5	0.4	0.5	10.1
Shannon Brown	59	22	23.8	.420	.277	.784	2.5	1.8	1.0	0.3	10.5
Goran Dragić	77	77	33.5	.443	.319	.748	3.1	7.4	1.6	0.3	14.7
Jared Dudley	79	50	27.5	.468	.391	.796	3.1	2.6	0.9	0.1	10.9
Diante Garrett	19	0	7.9	.327	.200	.500	0.8	1.6	0.5	0.0	2.1
Marcin Gortat	61	61	30.8	.521	.000	.652	8.5	1.2	0.7	1.6	11.1
Hamed Haddadi*	17	0	13.8	.459	.	.520	5.1	0.5	0.3	1.2	4.1
Wesley Johnson	50	21	19.0	.407	.323	.771	2.5	0.7	0.4	0.4	8.0
Kendall Marshall	48	3	14.6	.371	.315	.571	0.9	3.0	0.5	0.1	3.0
Marcus Morris*	23	6	16.0	.405	.308	.405	2.5	0.7	0.8	0.2	5.7
Markieff Morris	82	32	22.4	.407	.336	.732	4.8	1.3	0.9	0.8	8.2
Jermaine O'Neal	55	4	18.7	.482	.	.835	5.3	0.8	0.3	1.4	8.3
Luis Scola	82	67	26.6	.473	.188	.787	6.6	2.2	0.8	0.4	12.8
Sebastian Telfair*	46	2	17.3	.381	.381	.772	1.5	2.5	0.6	0.2	6.0
P. J. Tucker	79	45	24.2	.473	.314	.744	4.4	1.4	0.8	0.2	6.4
Luke Zeller	16	0	3.6	.346	.200	.	0.6	0.2	0.0	0.0	1.2

* – Stats with the Suns.

== Awards and records ==
=== Milestones ===
- During this season, Jermaine O'Neal would surpass Hall of Famer centers Moses Malone, Artis Gilmore, and Elvin Hayes on the list of National Basketball Association career blocks leaders, recording 72 blocks throughout the season.

=== Team milestones ===
- On January 12, 2013, the Phoenix Suns became the fourth fastest NBA team (tenth team overall) to win 2,000 games with a 97–81 road victory against the Chicago Bulls. The other three fastest 2,000 win teams were the Minneapolis/Los Angeles Lakers, the Boston Celtics, and the Syracuse Nationals/Philadelphia 76ers.

== Injuries/personal missed games ==
- September 20, 2012: Channing Frye was confirmed to miss the entirety of this season due to an enlarged heart via dilated cardiomyopathy. He would return to playing for the Suns the following season.
- November 5, 2012: Jermaine O'Neal would miss six games due to the death of his aunt. He would return to play against the L.A. Lakers on November 16.
- November 29, 2012: Kendall Marshall was assigned to the Suns' NBA D-League team: the Bakersfield Jam for nine games. He returned to the roster on December 22, 2012, against the Portland Trail Blazers.
- January 10, 2013: Diante Garrett was assigned to the Suns' NBA D-League team: the Bakersfield Jam for seven games. He returned to the roster on January 28, 2013.
- January 23, 2013: Jermaine O'Neal was confirmed to miss seven games due to having an irregular heartbeat. He ended up returning on February 5, 2013, against the Memphis Grizzlies.
- March 5, 2013: Jermaine O'Neal would miss four games due to his daughter Asjia having surgery to repair a leaky heart valve. He ended up returning on March 13, 2013, against the Houston Rockets.
- March 6, 2013: Marcin Gortat would be out for the Suns for the rest of the season by having a Lisfranc sprain occur in his right foot during a home game against the Toronto Raptors.
- April 6, 2013: Diante Garrett was once again assigned to the Bakersfield Jam. He returned to the Suns a day later.
- April 11, 2013: Diante Garrett was once more assigned to the Bakersfield Jam.

== Transactions ==
=== Trades ===
July 4, 2012

To Phoenix Suns

2013 first-round pick (from Miami via L.A. Lakers)
2018 first-round pick
2013 second round pick (from Denver via L.A. Lakers)
2014 second round pick
Cash Considerations

To Los Angeles Lakers

(Canada) / (South Africa) / (United Kingdom) Steve Nash

July 27, 2012
Three–team trade
To New Orleans Hornets

(United States) Robin Lopez (from Phoenix)
(United States) Hakim Warrick (from Phoenix)
Cash Considerations (from Phoenix)

To Minnesota Timberwolves

2013 second round pick (from Brooklyn via Minnesota & New Orleans)
2014 second round pick (from L.A. Lakers via Phoenix)
2016 second round pick (from New Orleans)

To Phoenix Suns

(United States) Jerome Dyson (from New Orleans)
(United States) Brad Miller (from New Orleans)
(United States) Wesley Johnson (from Minnesota)
2016 second round pick (from Minnesota)^{/}
2017 second round pick (from Minnesota)

February 20, 2013

To Phoenix Suns

(United States) Marcus Morris

To Houston Rockets

2013 second round pick

February 21, 2013

To Phoenix Suns

(Iran) Hamed Haddadi
2014 second round pick (from Toronto)

To Toronto Raptors

(United States) Sebastian Telfair

I: The Los Angeles Lakers originally planned for their 2015 first-round pick to be conveyed to Phoenix. Due to the Lakers' poor season records in the following seasons, the selection failed to be conveyed until 2018 when the Lakers did not have any protections on that year's pick.
II: The Minnesota Timberwolves' second round pick the Suns were to get was originally projected to be their own second round pick at the time of the trade. However, due to stipulations between New Orleans and a future trade involving the Timberwolves, the pick that was sent to Phoenix was New Orleans' second round pick in 2016 instead of Minnesota's 2016 second round pick.
III: The Minnesota Timberwolves had initially planned to send their own first-round pick (top-13 protected from 2013–14; top-12 protected from 2015–16) to the Suns before they traded it away to the Boston Celtics on January 9, 2015, for Brandan Wright. However, because Minnesota could not convey a first round selection for the Celtics due to their selections in those years being protected by 2016 due to them being eliminated from playoff contention in late March 2016, the Timberwolves would convey their 2016 and 2017 second round draft picks to Boston instead.
IV: The Toronto Raptors sent the least favorable of their own 2014 second round pick (top-36 protected) and the Sacramento Kings' 2014 second round pick (top-55 protected) that season.

=== Free agents ===
==== Additions ====
Player	Signed	Former Team
Luis Scola	Signed 3-year deal worth $13.5 Million as an amnestied player	Houston Rockets
Goran Dragić	Signed 4-year deal worth $34 Million	Houston Rockets
Michael Beasley	Signed 3-year deal worth $18 Million	Minnesota Timberwolves
Shannon Brown	Signed 2-year deal worth $7 Million	Phoenix Suns
P. J. Tucker	Signed 2-year deal worth $1.5 Million	(Germany) Brose Baskets Bamberg / (Russia) Spartak St. Petersburg
Jermaine O'Neal	Signed 1-year deal worth $1.35 Million	Boston Celtics
Luke Zeller	Signed 1-year deal worth $473,604	Austin Toros
Diante Garrett	Signed 1-year deal worth $473,604	(France) Jeunesse Sportive des Fontenelles de Nanterre

a: P. J. originally signed a contract to play for Spartak St. Petersburg in Russia. However, due to his performance in the Phoenix Suns' Summer League team, P. J. had earned the right to opt out of his contract with Spartak St. Petersburg and sign with the Suns. The last team P.J. officially played for, however, was with the Brose Baskets Bamberg in Germany. P. J. was also using his birth name of Anthony Tucker at that time as well.
b: Both Diante and Luke had initial rookie scale minimum deals due to being undrafted and spending their first seasons with the NBA. However, their deals weren't officially guaranteed until they continued to stay with the team on January 10, 2013. After the January 10 deadline, while both Garrett and Zeller ended up getting their money guaranteed, Zeller would end up being waived after the Suns traded for Marcus Morris, while Garrett was the only player to have stayed with the team at the end of the season.

==== Subtractions ====
Player	Reason left	New team
Steve Nash	Sign-and-traded as an unrestricted free agent	Los Angeles Lakers
Josh Childress	Amnestied	Brooklyn Nets
Aaron Brooks	Free Agent	Sacramento Kings / Houston Rockets
Grant Hill	Free Agent	Los Angeles Clippers
Ronnie Price	Free Agent	Portland Trail Blazers
Robin Lopez	Sign-and-traded as a restricted free agent	New Orleans Hornets
Hakim Warrick	Traded	New Orleans Hornets / Charlotte Bobcats / Orlando Magic
Jerome Dyson	Waived	(Israel) Hapoel Holon
Brad Miller	Waived	—N/a (Retired)
Michael Redd	Free Agent / Waived	—N/a (Retired)
Luke Zeller	Waived	Austin Toros
Sebastian Telfair	Traded	(Canada) Toronto Raptors

c: Because Josh Childress was amnestied from the Suns, he still got paid the remainder of his contract with the Suns (3 Years, $21 Million), but his salary away from the team did not affect the team's overall salary cap during that time period.
d: Childress would get waived by the Brooklyn Nets on December 29, 2012, and would not play for the rest of the season.
e: Aaron Brooks originally left the Suns due to the 2011 NBA lockout in concerns of playing for the 2011–12 NBA season. He signed with the Guangdong Southern Tigers in the Chinese Basketball Association. However, due to the CBA's newest policy during the lockout, he could not return to the Suns once the lockout ended. After his season with Guangdong officially ended, the Suns decided not to re-sign him for a new contract that year. He was initially given a qualifying offer as a restricted free agent with restricted benefits, but he was eventually rescinded of his restricted rights and became an unrestricted free agent.
f: Brooks originally signed with the Sacramento Kings after the Suns decided to not use his restricted free agent rights that they initially had. Brooks continued to play for the Kings until March 1, 2013, which would be when the Kings decided to waive his contract. Four days later, Brooks decided to return to his original team, the Houston Rockets, for the rest of the season. As a result, the 2011 trade of having Goran Dragić being sent to the Houston Rockets and Aaron Brooks being sent to the Suns more or less ended up being reversed around two years later.
g: Ronnie Price would be waived by the Portland Trail Blazers on February 21, 2013.
h: Hakim Warrick was first traded to the New Orleans Hornets along with Robin Lopez. However, later on in the month of November, the Hornets decided to trade Warrick to the Charlotte Bobcats in exchange for Matt Carroll, who would never play a single game for the Hornets. In contrast, Warrick only played one game for the Hornets before the trade happened. However, Warrick would be traded once again before the trade deadline; this time, he was sent to the Orlando Magic in exchange for power forward Josh McRoberts. Warrick would then be waived from the Orlando Magic two days after the trade deadline; he would never play a single game for the Magic.
i: Even though Brad Miller announced that after last season he would retire from playing basketball, he still had obligations in his contract that allowed him to come over with the Suns. Once the Suns decided to let him go (alongside Jerome Dyson), Miller would officially announce his retirement from playing basketball. In addition, even though Michael Redd was considered a free agent after his season with the Suns was over with, he never did find a new team for him to sign up with. As a result, Redd would announce his retirement from the NBA on November 6, 2013, well over a year after being an unrestricted free agent.
j: Luke Zeller first tried out for the Georgia national basketball team during the 2013 EuroBasket Tournament's tryouts at the end of the 2012–13 season before signing with the D-League's Austin Toros (which was also the last team Zeller played for before signing up with the Suns) nearly an entire year after being waived by the Suns on December 27, 2013.

== See also ==
- 2012–13 NBA season
