= Wesley Johnson (basketball) =

American basketball player (born 1987)

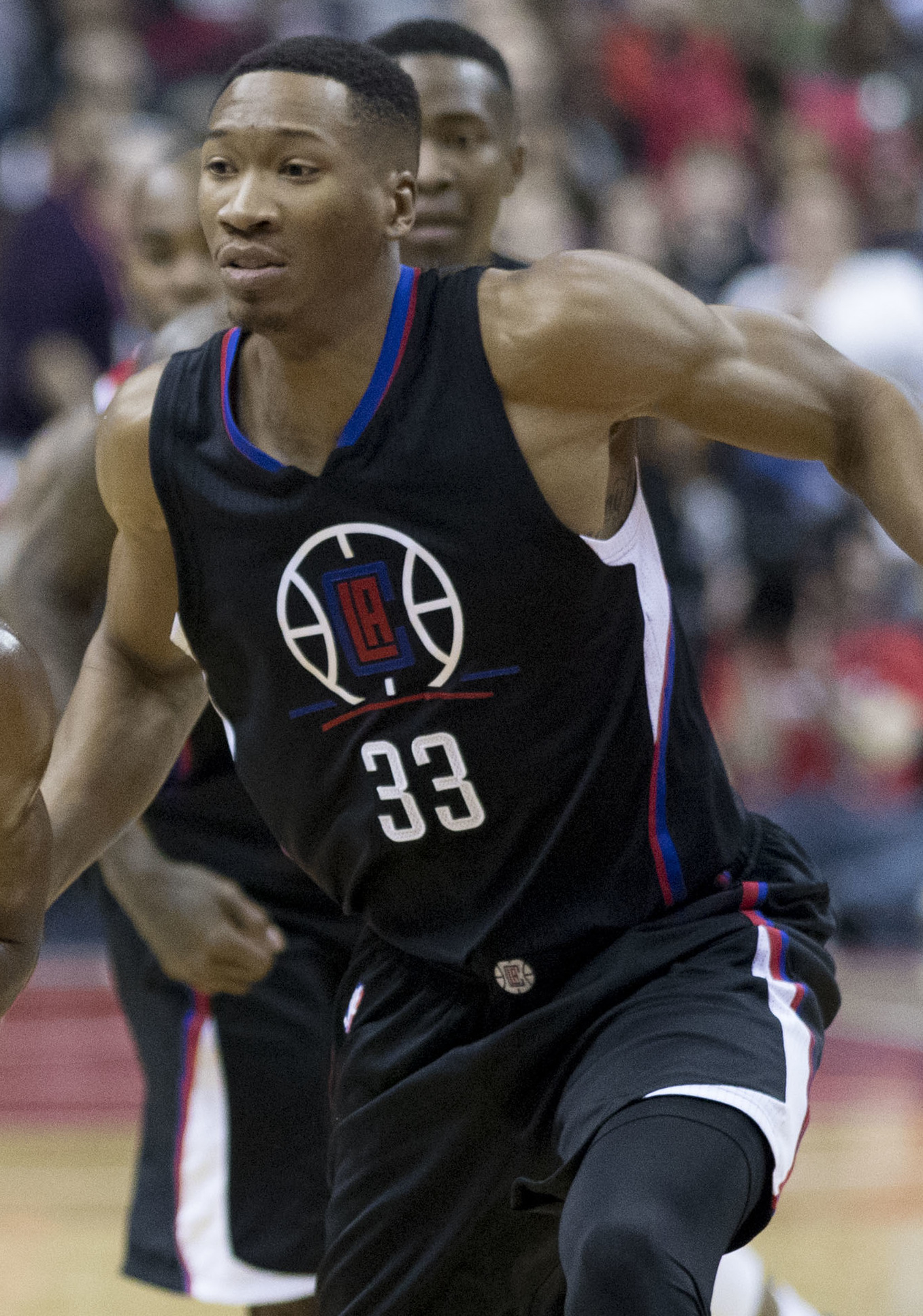
- Johnson with the Los Angeles Clippers in 2016

College Park Skyhawks
- Title: Assistant coach
- League: NBA G League

Personal information
- Born: July 11, 1987 (age 39) Corsicana, Texas, U.S.
- Listed height: 6 ft 7 in (2.01 m)
- Listed weight: 215 lb (98 kg)

Career information
- High school: Corsicana (Corsicana, Texas); Patterson (Lenoir, North Carolina)
- College: Iowa State (2006–2008); Syracuse (2009–2010)
- NBA draft: 2010: 1st round, 4th overall pick
- Drafted by: Minnesota Timberwolves
- Playing career: 2010–2020
- Position: Small forward / shooting guard
- Number: 4, 2, 11, 33, 24
- Coaching career: 2026–present

Career history

Playing
- 2010–2012: Minnesota Timberwolves
- 2012–2013: Phoenix Suns
- 2013–2015: Los Angeles Lakers
- 2015–2018: Los Angeles Clippers
- 2018–2019: New Orleans Pelicans
- 2019: Washington Wizards
- 2019–2020: Panathinaikos

Coaching
- 2026–present: College Park Skyhawks (assistant)

Career highlights
- Greek League champion (2020); NBA All-Rookie Second Team (2011); Consensus first-team All-American (2010); Big East Player of the Year (2010); First-team All-Big East (2010)

Career NBA statistics
- Points: 4,235 (7.0 ppg)
- Rebounds: 1,924 (3.2 rpg)
- Assists: 645 (1.1 apg)
- Stats at NBA.com
- Stats at Basketball Reference

Wesley JaMarr Johnson (born July 11, 1987) is an American professional basketball coach and former player. He currently operates Wes Johnson Basketball, a private basketball training business based in New Orleans, Louisiana, offering coaching for high school, college, and competitive athletes. who is currently an assistant coach for the College Park Skyhawks of the NBA G League. He played college basketball for the Iowa State Cyclones and Syracuse Orange. He was selected by the Minnesota Timberwolves with the fourth overall pick in the 2010 NBA draft.

== Early life ==
In high school, he averaged 15.2 points, 9.7 rebounds and 4.3 blocks as a senior at Corsicana High School. He was a first-team all-district pick in 2004 and 2005. He also played for the Dallas Mustangs AAU team.

== College career ==
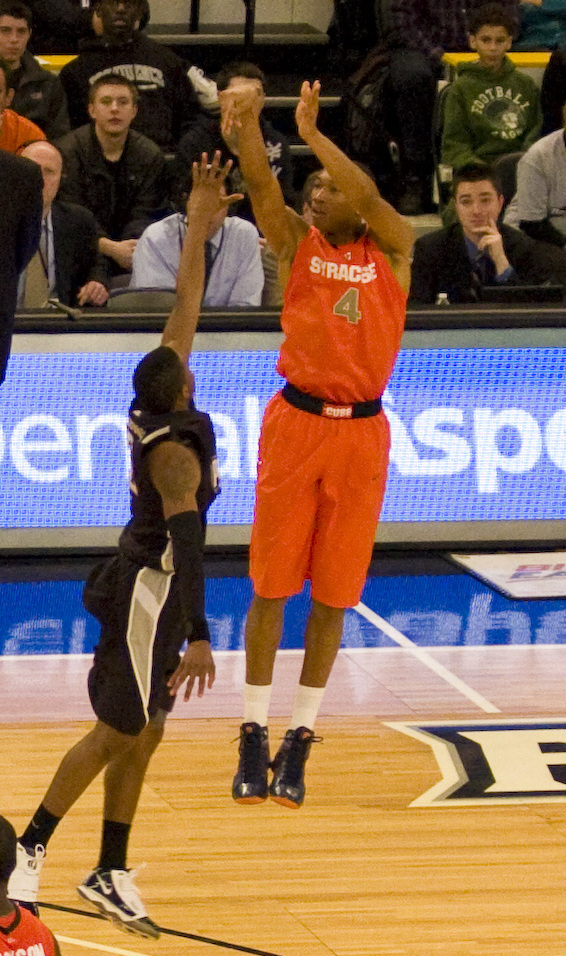
Johnson with Syracuse in 2010

As a freshman at Iowa State, Johnson was named to the Big 12 all-Rookie team and earned honorable mention freshman All-America honors after averaging 12.3 points and 7.9 rebounds, starting 30 of 31 games. Johnson's highlights from his freshman year included 14 points and 13 rebounds in win against Missouri, including the game-winner on a tip-in with 1.6 seconds left. He also scored 17 points at No. 10 Texas A&M.

Johnson missed five games and played with an injured ankle throughout the majority of the season. He still was named an honorable mention all-Big 12 selection after averaging 12.4 points and 4.0 rebounds per game. Johnson scored 20 points behind a 5-of-11 effort from 3-point range against eventual NCAA Champion Kansas.

Johnson made the decision to transfer following the 2008 season, and selected Syracuse. Per NCAA transfer rules, he had to sit out the 2008–09 season, leaving him with two years of college eligibility.

Johnson became a starter for the Orange in his first year with the team. In November 2009 he was named MVP of the 2K Coaches Classic after scoring 25 points in a Syracuse victory over the No. 6 North Carolina. Johnson would score 17 points and grab 10 rebounds as Syracuse knocked off then-No. 10 Florida on December 10, 2009. In his first game of Big East play, Johnson scored 20 points and grabbed a career high 19 rebounds as Syracuse defeated Seton Hall 80–73 on December 29, 2009. Johnson was named Big East Player of the Year on March 9, 2010, finishing with season averages of 16.0 points and 8.4 rebounds. On March 29, 2010, Johnson was named a First Team AP All American.

On April 12, 2010, Johnson declared himself eligible for the NBA draft, forgoing his final year of college eligibility. He signed with sports agent Rob Pelinka.

== Professional career ==
=== Minnesota Timberwolves (2010–2012) ===
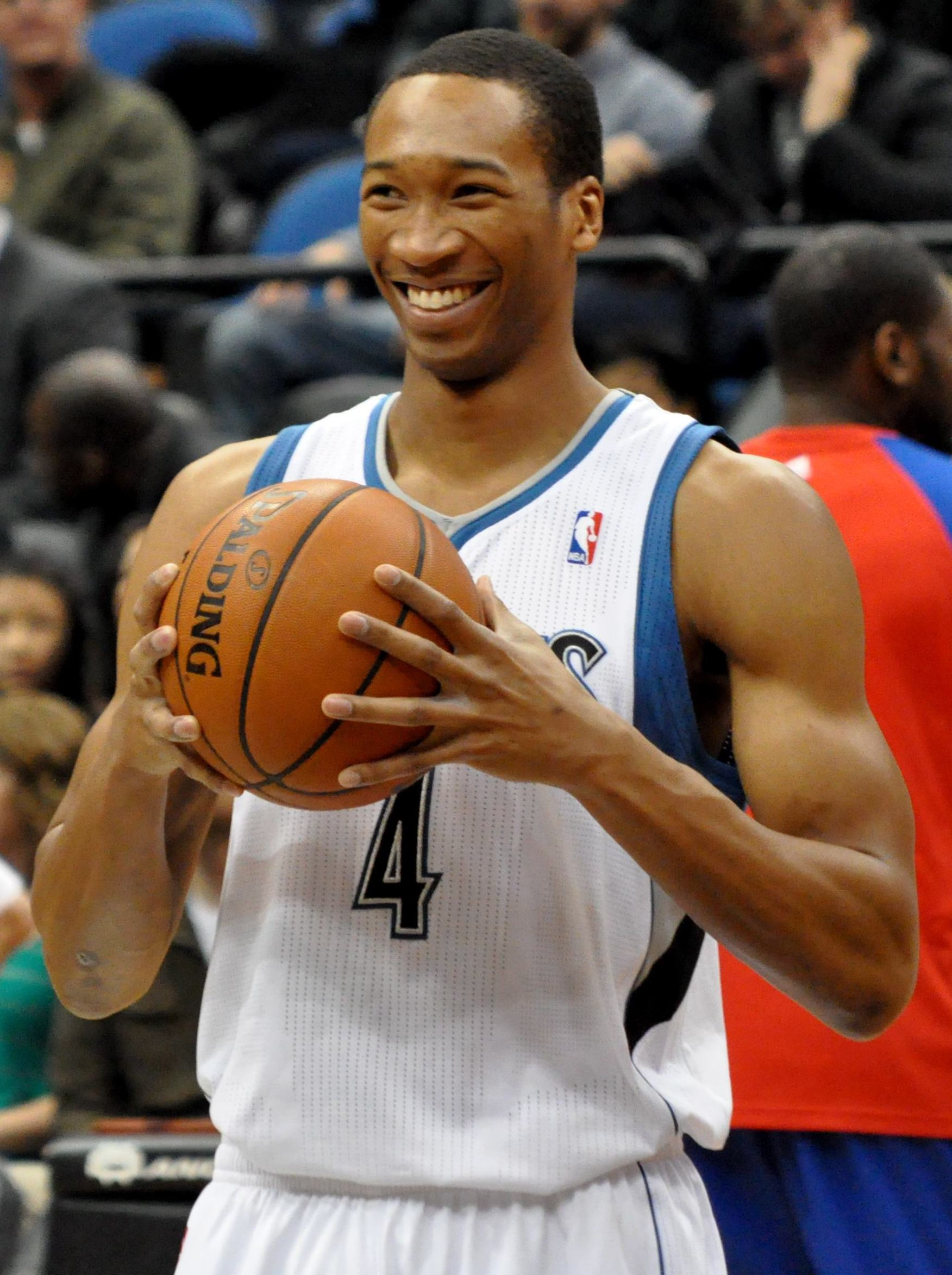
Johnson with the Timberwolves in January 2012

Johnson was drafted by the Minnesota Timberwolves with the 4th pick in the 2010 NBA draft. On March 18, 2011, Johnson scored a career-high 29 points on 11-for-21 shooting in a loss against the Los Angeles Lakers.

=== Phoenix Suns (2012–2013) ===
On July 27, 2012, Johnson was traded to the Phoenix Suns in a three-team deal. In his first game with the Suns, Johnson scored a three-pointer in a close victory against the Detroit Pistons. Johnson would not gain significant playing time with the Suns until Lindsey Hunter took over as head coach for the team. On February 26, 2013, Johnson recorded 14 points, along with 9 rebounds, 3 assists, and 2 steals in an 84–83 victory against his former team, the Minnesota Timberwolves. A day later, Johnson made a game-tying three-pointer from a long pass by Jermaine O'Neal that helped the Suns win 105–101 in overtime against the San Antonio Spurs. On March 1, 2013, Johnson scored a season high 15 points and added six rebounds and two steals in a 92–87 victory against the Atlanta Hawks.

=== Los Angeles Lakers (2013–2015) ===
On July 15, 2013, Johnson signed a one-year deal with the Los Angeles Lakers. In his first season with the Lakers, Johnson averaged career highs in points, rebounds, steals and blocks. He was one of only eight players in the league to average at least 1 block and 1 steal per game, and the only perimeter player to do so. He had four games where he scored 20 or more points, the most since his rookie season. On November 29, 2013, Johnson recorded 27 points, along with 6 rebounds and 3 blocks, in a 106–102 victory against the Detroit Pistons. He tallied four double-doubles over the course of the season, a career high.

On July 28, 2014, Johnson re-signed with the Lakers on a one-year deal.

=== Los Angeles Clippers (2015–2018) ===
On July 9, 2015, Johnson signed a one-year deal with the Los Angeles Clippers. He made his debut for the Clippers in the team's season opener against the Sacramento Kings on October 28, recording 3 points and 1 steal in a 111–104 win.

On July 8, 2016, Johnson re-signed with the Clippers.

=== New Orleans Pelicans (2018–2019) ===
On October 15, 2018, Johnson was traded to the New Orleans Pelicans in exchange for Alexis Ajinça.

=== Washington Wizards (2019) ===
On February 7, 2019, Johnson was traded to the Washington Wizards in exchange for Markieff Morris and a 2023 second-round pick. On April 5, 2019, Johnson was waived by the Wizards.

=== Panathinaikos (2019–2020) ===
On July 22, 2019, Johnson signed a one-year deal with Panathinaikos of the Greek Basket League and the EuroLeague. In his first career game with Panathinaikos, Johnson scored 7 points in 19 minutes of playing time against AEK Athens.

== Career statistics ==
Legend
GP	Games played	GS	Games started	MPG	Minutes per game
FG%	Field-goal percentage	3P%	3-point field-goal percentage	FT%	Free-throw percentage
RPG	Rebounds per game	APG	Assists per game	SPG	Steals per game
BPG	Blocks per game	PPG	Points per game	PIR	Performance index rating
**Bold**	Career high

=== NBA ===
==== Regular season ====
Year	Team	GP	GS	MPG	FG%	3P%	FT%	RPG	APG	SPG	BPG	PPG
2010–11	Minnesota	79	63	26.2	.397	.356	.696	3.0	**1.9**	.7	.7	9.0
2011–12	Minnesota	65	**64**	22.6	.398	.314	.706	2.7	.9	.5	**.7**	6.0
2012–13	Phoenix	50	21	19.1	.407	.323	.771	2.5	.7	.4	.4	8.0
2013–14	L.A. Lakers	79	62	28.4	**.425**	**.369**	.792	**4.4**	1.6	**1.1**	**1.0**	9.1
2014–15	L.A. Lakers	76	59	**29.5**	.414	.351	**.804**	4.2	1.6	.8	.6	**9.9**
2015–16	L.A. Clippers	**80**	9	20.8	.404	.333	.652	3.1	.6	1.1	.7	6.9
2016–17	L.A. Clippers	68	3	11.9	.365	.246	.647	2.7	.3	.4	.4	2.7
2017–18	L.A. Clippers	74	40	20.1	.408	.339	.741	2.9	.8	1.0	.8	5.4
2018–19	New Orleans	26	13	14.5	.398	.380	.667	2.1	.6	.5	.3	3.7
2018–19	Washington	12	0	13.1	.250	.231	.700	1.5	.6	.2	.4	2.8
Career		609	334	22.1	.404	.337	.741	3.2	1.1	.8	.7	7.0

==== Playoffs ====
Year	Team	GP	GS	MPG	FG%	3P%	FT%	RPG	APG	SPG	BPG	PPG
2016	L.A. Clippers	**6**	0	**12.8**	**.357**	**.333**	**1.000**	**3.0**	**.3**	.2	**.7**	**2.7**
2017	L.A. Clippers	3	0	3.6	.000	.000	.500	.7	.0	**.3**	.0	.3
Career		9	0	9.7	.357	.333	.800	2.2	.2	.2	.4	1.9

=== EuroLeague ===
*	Led the league

Year	Team	GP	GS	MPG	FG%	3P%	FT%	RPG	APG	SPG	BPG	PPG	PIR
2019–20	Panathinaikos	28*	0	15.7	.348	.263	.667	2.4	.6	.6	.5	3.3	3.4
Career		28	0	15.7	.348	.263	.667	2.4	.6	.6	.5	3.3	3.4

=== College ===
Year	Team	GP	GS	MPG	FG%	3P%	FT%	RPG	APG	SPG	BPG	PPG
2006–07	Iowa State	31	30	31.7	.445	.294	.753	7.9	1.1	.8	1.1	12.3
2007–08	Iowa State	27	25	27.0	.396	.333	**.779**	4.0	1.4	.9	.4	12.4
2009–10	Syracuse	**35**	**35**	**35.0**	**.502**	**.415**	.772	**8.5**	**2.2**	**1.7**	**1.8**	**16.5**
Career		93	90	31.6	.454	.349	.768	7.0	1.6	1.1	1.2	13.9
