= Shannon Brown =

American basketball player (born 1985)

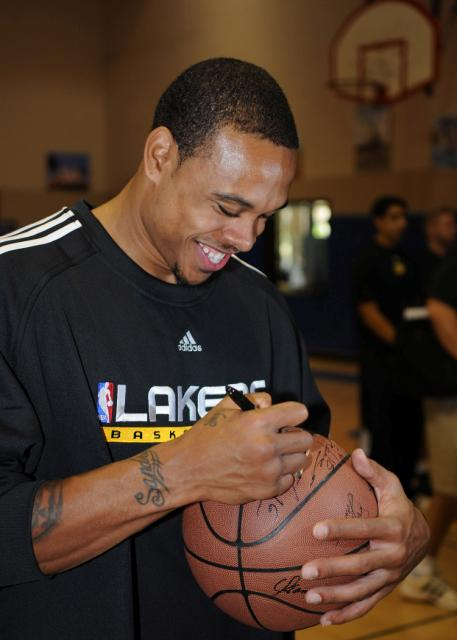
- Brown signing a basketball during his tenure with the Los Angeles Lakers in 2009

Personal information
- Born: November 29, 1985 (age 40) Maywood, Illinois, U.S.
- Listed height: 6 ft 4 in (1.93 m)
- Listed weight: 210 lb (95 kg)

Career information
- High school: Proviso East (Maywood, Illinois)
- College: Michigan State (2003–2006)
- NBA draft: 2006: 1st round, 25th overall pick
- Drafted by: Cleveland Cavaliers
- Playing career: 2006–2018
- Position: Shooting guard
- Number: 6, 12, 26, 1

Career history
- 2006–2008: Cleveland Cavaliers
- 2007: →Albuquerque Thunderbirds
- 2008: →Rio Grande Valley Vipers
- 2008: Chicago Bulls
- 2008: →Iowa Energy
- 2008–2009: Charlotte Bobcats
- 2009–2011: Los Angeles Lakers
- 2011–2013: Phoenix Suns
- 2014: San Antonio Spurs
- 2014: New York Knicks
- 2014: Miami Heat
- 2017–2018: Wisconsin Herd
- 2018: Delaware 87ers

Career highlights
- 2× NBA champion (2009, 2010); First-team Parade All-American (2003); McDonald's All-American (2003); Illinois Mr. Basketball (2003)

Career NBA statistics
- Points: 3,118 (7.6 ppg)
- Rebounds: 760 (1.9 rpg)
- Assists: 458 (1.1 apg)
- Stats at NBA.com
- Stats at Basketball Reference

Shannon Brown (born November 29, 1985) is an American former professional basketball player. He attended Proviso East High School in Maywood, Illinois, was named Illinois Mr. Basketball in 2003, and played college basketball for Michigan State University. He was drafted by the Cleveland Cavaliers with the 25th overall pick in the 2006 NBA draft. He played in the NBA for eight seasons, and won two championships, with the 2008-2009 and 2009-2010 Los Angeles Lakers. He was known for his sensational athleticism and as one of the great leapers in the NBA.

== High school and college career ==
Brown attended Proviso East High School in Maywood, where his teammates included fellow 2006 draftee Dee Brown. In 2003, he was named Illinois Mr. Basketball and a McDonald's All-American.

Considered a five-star recruit by Rivals.com, Brown was listed as the No. 1 shooting guard and the No. 3 player in the nation in 2003.

Brown played college basketball for the Michigan State Spartans. He was second-team All-Big Ten as a junior and an All-Big Ten Defensive selection.

== Professional career ==
=== Cleveland Cavaliers (2006–2008) ===
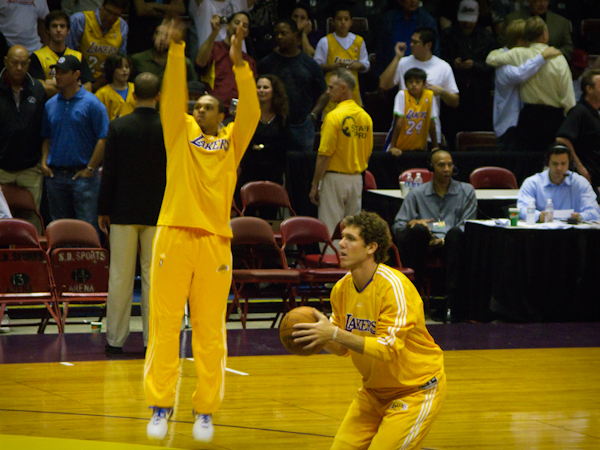
Brown (left) practices shooting with former Lakers teammate Luke Walton.

Brown was drafted in the first round with the 25th pick of the 2006 NBA draft by the Cleveland Cavaliers. Appearing in only 23 games (five starts) in his debut season, he showed promise, scoring in double figures twice (10 points vs. New York on November 29 and 14 vs. Toronto on 3/3), but was hampered by an injury to his shin.

Brown was assigned to the NBA Development League's Albuquerque Thunderbirds on March 2, 2007, but was recalled by the Cavaliers a day later. In his sole game as a Thunderbird, Brown scored 14 points with four rebounds and six assists. Brown returned to the NBA Development League, this time with the Rio Grande Valley Vipers, on January 11, 2008. In four games as a Viper, He averaged 23.5 points, including a 37-point performance against the Dakota Wizards on January 16. He was recalled by the Cavaliers on January 17.

Through 2007–08's All-Star break, Brown played in 15 games during the season (starting four games), averaging 7.0 points per game.

=== Chicago Bulls (2008) ===
On February 21, 2008, Brown was traded to the Chicago Bulls as part of a three-team deal between the Bulls, the Cavaliers, and the Sonics. The Sonics received Cavs forward Ira Newble, Cavs forward Donyell Marshall, and Bulls forward Adrian Griffin. The Cavs received Bulls center Ben Wallace, Bulls forward Joe Smith, the Bulls' 2009 second round pick (who turned out to be Danny Green), Sonics forward Wally Szczerbiak, and Sonics guard Delonte West. While the Bulls received Brown, Cavs forward Drew Gooden, Cavs guard Larry Hughes, and Cavs forward Cedric Simmons.

=== Charlotte Bobcats (2008–2009) ===
On August 6, 2008, Brown was signed to the Charlotte Bobcats to a one-year contract worth the minimum NBA salary of $800,000. He would average only 4.8 points in limited action with the Bobcats.

=== Los Angeles Lakers (2009–2011) ===
On February 7, 2009, Brown was traded, along with Adam Morrison, to the Los Angeles Lakers for Vladimir Radmanović.

Brown's playing time with the Lakers was initially limited. Towards the end of the season, Brown experienced an upswing of playtime. In the final five games of the season, Brown played for an average of 16.4 minutes. With those minutes, he averaged 7.2 points, 2.4 rebounds, and 1.6 assists.

Brown's increased playtime carried on to the playoffs. In the opening game in the first round match-up against the Jazz, Brown played 22 minutes. He had nine points, three assists, two rebounds and a steal. He finished the series averaging 17.4 minutes, 7.2 points, 1.2 rebounds, 1.8 assists, and one steal per game.

On July 6, 2009, Brown agreed to return to the Lakers for two years and $4.2 million.

It was announced on January 18, 2010, that he was selected to compete in the Sprite Slam Dunk Competition in Dallas at the 2010 All-Star weekend. On the same day, Brown led the Lakers with 22 points in their 98–92 win against the Orlando Magic. Brown participated in the dunk contest on February 13, 2010, but did not advance beyond the first round.

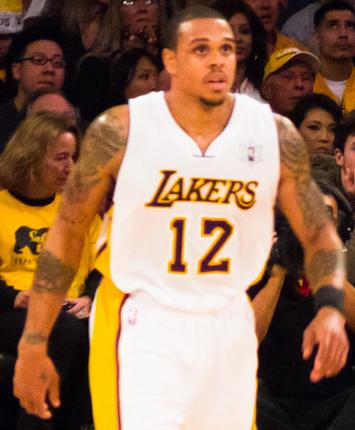
Brown with the Lakers in 2010

On February 16, 2010, in a game against the Golden State Warriors, Brown scored a then career-high 27 points and grabbed 10 rebounds for his first career double-double. He won his second championship at the end of the season.

On August 8, 2010, Brown signed a two-year deal with the Lakers worth $4.6 million. During that season, he averaged 8.7 points in 19 minutes per game. He scored a season-high 21 points in two separate games, against the Milwaukee Bucks (November 16) and the Chicago Bulls (November 23). During the postseason, Brown averaged seven points per game. In the Lakers' last two games against the Dallas Mavericks, Brown scored 10 and 15 points respectively before his team was swept by the eventual champion.

On June 30, 2011, Brown elected not to exercise his option to extend his contract with the Lakers for the 2011–12 season.

=== Phoenix Suns (2011–2013) ===
After the 2011 NBA lockout ended on December 8, 2011, the Phoenix Suns signed Brown to a one-year contract. On March 15, 2012, Brown led the Suns with 21 points in a tough 91–87 victory over the Los Angeles Clippers. On March 27, 2012, Brown scored a career-high 32 points, with five 3-pointers, in a loss to the San Antonio Spurs. On April 7, 2012, Brown scored 20 points in the third quarter against his former team, the Los Angeles Lakers. He led the team with 24 points in a blowout 125–105 victory. Two days later, Brown grabbed seven rebounds for the Suns (tied for the team game-high with Marcin Gortat) in a blowout 114–90 victory against the Minnesota Timberwolves.

On July 25, 2012, Brown agreed to re-sign with Phoenix on a two-year deal worth $7 million. On November 7, 2012, Brown hit six straight three-pointers in the fourth quarter to lead the team in points with 24 and help them win 117–110 against his former team, the Charlotte Bobcats. Two days later, he scored 12 of his 22 points in the fourth quarter of a 107–105 victory against another former team, the Cleveland Cavaliers. This was the first time he scored 20 or more points in consecutive games.

On October 25, 2013, Brown was traded, along with Marcin Gortat, Malcolm Lee, and Kendall Marshall, to the Washington Wizards in exchange for Emeka Okafor and a 2014 first-round draft pick. Brown, Lee, and Marshall were all waived by the Wizards three days later.

=== San Antonio Spurs (2014) ===
On February 1, 2014, Brown signed a 10-day contract with the San Antonio Spurs. On February 12, 2014, he signed a second 10-day contract with the Spurs. After Brown's second 10-day contract expired, the Spurs decided to part ways with him. The Spurs would eventually win the 2014 Finals the same season, their 5th title in franchise history.

=== New York Knicks (2014) ===
On February 27, 2014, Brown signed a 10-day contract with the New York Knicks. On March 10, 2014, he signed a second 10-day contract with the Knicks. On March 20, 2014, he signed with the Knicks for the rest of the season. On July 23, 2014, he was waived by the Knicks.

=== Miami Heat (2014) ===
On August 27, 2014, Brown signed with the Miami Heat. On November 24, 2014, he was waived by the Heat after appearing in five games.

=== Wisconsin Herd (2017–2018) ===
On October 30, 2016, Brown was selected by the Grand Rapids Drive in the second round of the 2016 NBA Development League Draft, but was waived by the Drive on November 10.

On November 16, 2017, Brown was added to the roster of the Milwaukee Bucks G-League affiliate, the Wisconsin Herd.

=== Delaware 87ers (2018) ===
On January 26, 2018, Brown was traded to the Delaware 87ers, making his debut that same day.

== Player profile ==
While never achieving All-Star status in the NBA, Brown was known for his sensational athleticism. A 2006 Draft analysis described him as "one of the most explosive athletes in this draft, possessing good length, huge hands and excellent strength to make an impact off an NBA bench." Brown reportedly had a vertical jump height of 44.5", which puts him among the top 10 leapers in NBA history. In his first game with the Lakers in 2008, he had what was described as the "Best block ever that didn't count". In 2010, while playing for the Lakers he was once described as "the most exciting player on L.A.'s premier sports team," and that his "unparalleled athleticism and hops alone made him worth watching." His dunks and blocks were a regular feature of highlight reels.

== Career statistics ==
Legend
GP	Games played	GS	Games started	MPG	Minutes per game
FG%	Field goal percentage	3P%	3-point field goal percentage	FT%	Free throw percentage
RPG	Rebounds per game	APG	Assists per game	SPG	Steals per game
BPG	Blocks per game	PPG	Points per game	**Bold**	Career high
†	Won an NBA championship	*	Led the league

=== NBA ===
==== Regular season ====
Year	Team	GP	GS	MPG	FG%	3P%	FT%	RPG	APG	SPG	BPG	PPG
2006–07	Cleveland	23	5	8.8	.378	.280	.714	.9	.4	.3	.1	3.2
2007–08	Cleveland	15	4	14.5	.369	.310	.609	1.2	1.1	.7	.1	7.0
2007–08	Chicago	6	0	3.7	.200	.000	.500	.3	.0	.2	.3	1.5
2008–09	Charlotte	30	0	11.4	.455	.286	.800	.8	.9	.6	.2	4.8
2008–09†	L.A. Lakers	18	0	7.6	**.524**	**.667**	.889	1.1	.6	.2	.1	3.2
2009–10†	L.A. Lakers	**82***	7	20.7	.427	.328	.818	2.2	1.3	.7	**.4**	8.1
2010–11	L.A. Lakers	**82**	0	19.1	.425	.349	**.911**	1.9	1.2	.8	.2	8.7
2011–12	Phoenix	59	19	23.7	.420	.362	.808	**2.7**	1.2	.7	.3	**11.0**
2012–13	Phoenix	59	**22**	**23.8**	.420	.277	.784	2.5	**1.8**	**1.0**	.3	10.5
2013–14	San Antonio	10	1	10.3	.286	.000	.778	1.3	.5	.1	.0	2.3
2013–14	New York	19	0	7.8	.421	.000	.667	.8	.2	.6	.0	2.1
2014–15	Miami	5	2	17.8	.368	.429	.667	.2	.6	.8	.0	4.0
Career		408	60	18.0	.420	.332	.807	1.9	1.1	.7	.2	7.6

==== Playoffs ====
Year	Team	GP	GS	MPG	FG%	3P%	FT%	RPG	APG	SPG	BPG	PPG
2007	Cleveland	1	0	.0	.000	.000	.000	.0	.0	.0	.0	.0
2009†	L.A. Lakers	21	0	13.1	.434	**.480**	**.792**	1.2	.6	.5	.1	4.9
2010†	L.A. Lakers	**23**	0	14.1	.393	.281	.714	1.3	**.9**	.4	**.3**	4.9
2011	L.A. Lakers	10	0	**16.6**	**.459**	.280	.643	**1.9**	.7	**.6**	.2	**7.2**
Career		55	0	13.9	.422	.341	.727	1.3	.7	.5	.2	5.2

=== College ===
Year	Team	GP	GS	MPG	FG%	3P%	FT%	RPG	APG	SPG	BPG	PPG
2003–04	Michigan State	30	24	22.9	.451	.341	.807	2.5	1.3	1.1	.0	7.9
2004–05	Michigan State	33	31	25.1	.447	.330	**.848**	3.2	1.7	1.2	**.2**	10.9
2005–06	Michigan State	**34**	**34**	**35.2**	**.467**	**.390**	.830	**4.4**	**2.7**	**1.5**	.1	**17.2**
Total		97	89	28.0	.457	.364	.831	3.4	1.9	1.3	.1	12.2

== Music video and film appearances ==
He appeared in music videos to Toni Braxton's "Yesterday", Monica's "Love All Over Me", and Nelly's "Just a Dream".

Brown appears as himself in the 2012 film Think Like a Man. Brown also appears in the 2015 film Trainwreck as a member of the Knicks.

== Personal life ==
In 2010, Brown began a relationship with R&B singer Monica. The pair met in June of that year when Brown was consulted to star as her love interest in the music video for the single "Love All Over Me". In October 2010, Monica confirmed her engagement to Brown via Twitter, posting a photo of her rose-cut diamond ring. On November 22, 2010, Monica and Brown were married in a secret ceremony at their Los Angeles home. The marriage, however, did not become a matter of public record until January 21, 2011, when Brown told the Hip-Hop Non-Stop TV-Show. The couple had a second wedding ceremony for family and friends in July 2011.

On March 27, 2019, it was reported Monica was divorcing Brown. As of October 2019, their divorce was finalized.

Brown has a son, Shannon Christopher Brown, and a daughter, Laiyah Shannon Brown, from his marriage to Monica.

His brother Sterling Brown is an American professional basketball player for Partizan of the EuroLeague.

=== Legal issues ===
On October 7, 2021, Brown was indicted for insurance fraud in the Southern District of New York for allegedly defrauding the NBA's health and welfare benefit plan. In April 2023, Brown consented to pay $320,000 in restitution after pleading guilty to the charges.

Awards and achievements
Preceded by Dee Brown	Illinois Mr. Basketball Award Winner; 2003	Succeeded by Shaun Livingston
