= Luke Zeller =

American basketball player (born 1987)

Personal information
- Born: April 7, 1987 (age 39) Ames, Iowa, U.S.
- Listed height: 6 ft 11 in (2.11 m)
- Listed weight: 245 lb (111 kg)

Career information
- High school: Washington (Washington, Indiana)
- College: Notre Dame (2005–2009)
- NBA draft: 2009: undrafted
- Playing career: 2009–2014
- Position: Power forward / center
- Number: 40

Career history
- 2009–2010: Shiga Lakestars
- 2010: Naglis-Adakris
- 2010–2011: Bakersfield Jam
- 2011–2012: Austin Toros
- 2012–2013: Phoenix Suns
- 2013–2014: Austin Toros

Career highlights
- NBA Development League champion (2012); McDonald's All-American (2005); Indiana Mr. Basketball (2005)
- Stats at NBA.com
- Stats at Basketball Reference

Lucas Joseph Zeller (born April 7, 1987) is an American-Georgian former professional basketball player. He is the brother of NBA players Tyler and Cody Zeller, and the nephew of former NBA player Al Eberhard.

== Early life ==
Zeller attended Washington High School in Washington, Indiana where he played for the basketball team all four years under coach Dave Omer. As a freshman in 2001–02, he averaged 15.3 points and 8.0 rebounds per game, and as a sophomore in 2002–03, he averaged 18.1 points and 8.3 rebounds per game. As a junior in 2003–04, he averaged a near double-double with 19.8 points and 9.4 rebounds per game, becoming the first player in Washington High School history to eclipse the 1,000-point career mark. He participated in the Nike All-America camps in 2003 and 2004, and was a member of the USA North Team that captured the silver medal at the 2004 Men's Youth Development Festival. In five games, Zeller averaged 9.4 points and 6.4 rebounds per game.

On November 10, 2004, Zeller signed a National Letter of Intent to play college basketball for the University of Notre Dame.

As senior in 2004–05, Zeller averaged 19.6 points, 8.9 rebounds and 4.0 assists per game while leading his team to a 27–2 record and the Indiana Class 3A state championship. He finished the state championship game with 27 points, nine rebounds and 11 assists (a Class 3A state finals record). In that game, he hit the game-winning shot from midcourt as time expired in overtime to lead the Hatchets to a 74–72 win over Plymouth. He finished his high school career as a four-time all-state, all-section and all-conference honoree, and finished as Washington's all-time leader in points (1,727) and second in rebounds (820). The three-time team captain and two-time MVP became the only player in Washington High School history to be selected all-conference four times. He earned McDonald's All-American and Indiana Mr. Basketball honors at the season's end, was named the school's co-valedictorian, and earned National Honor Roll selection.

== College career ==
As a freshman at Notre Dame in 2005–06, Zeller averaged 3.4 points and 3.1 rebounds per game, and played in 27 contests and made nine starts. At the season's end, he earned Big East Academic All-Star Team honors, and was a member of the Athletes in Action team that captured the gold medal at the 2006 William Jones Cup in Taipei City, Taiwan.

As a sophomore in 2006–07, Zeller started the first 16 games of the season and played in all 32 contests, while averaging 3.8 points and 2.2 rebounds per game. On December 16, 2006, he scored a then career-high 14 points in a 94–63 win over Elon. On March 9, 2007, he scored four points in 18 minutes in the team's Big East Championship semi-final loss to Georgetown. At the season's end, he was named the recipient of the Notre Dame Club of St. Joseph Valley Rockne Student-Athlete Award.

In August 2007, Zeller travelled with Athletes in Action to Australia where he played in eight exhibition games and averaged 11.3 points and 6.6 rebounds while netting double figures in five of those contests.

As a junior in 2007–08, Zeller earned the Notre Dame Most Improved Player Award after averaging 4.5 points and 2.2 rebounds coming off the bench in all 33 contests.

As a senior in 2008–09, Zeller served as one of four captains. He played in all 36 games and earned seven starts during his final season, averaging a career-high 4.9 points per game, while bringing down 2.8 rebounds per contest. Zeller had a career outing against USC Upstate in the season opener as he came off the bench in 19 minutes of action to score a career-high 18 points on 6-of-7 from the field and was 4-of-6 from three-point range. In addition to the 18 points, he grabbed five rebounds. On November 24, 2008, he recorded his first career double-double in win over Indiana at the EA Sports Maui Invitational as he finished with 10 points and a career-high 11 rebounds. He concluded his career tied for third with 128 games played; he made 32 career starts and averaged 4.2 points and 2.5 rebounds per game.

== Professional career ==
=== 2009–10 season ===
After going undrafted in the 2009 NBA draft, Zeller joined the Chicago Bulls for the 2009 NBA Summer League where he averaged 3.0 points and 2.3 rebounds in four games. On July 31, 2009, he signed a one-year deal with the Shiga Lakestars of the Japanese bj league. In 50 games for Shiga in 2009–10, he averaged 8.2 points and 7.2 rebounds per game.

=== 2010–11 season ===
On September 22, 2010, Zeller signed a one-year deal with Naglis-Adakris of the Lithuanian Basketball League. However, he was released by the club on October 24 after appearing in six games. On November 1, he was selected by the Iowa Energy in the second round of the 2010 NBA Development League Draft. A week later, he was traded to the Bakersfield Jam. In 52 games for the Jam in 2010–11, he averaged 6.8 points, 4.5 rebounds and 1.3 assists per game.

=== 2011–12 season ===
On November 1, 2011, Zeller was acquired by the Austin Toros in a trade with the Bakersfield Jam. On December 9, he signed with the San Antonio Spurs. However, he was later waived by the team on December 24 after appearing in one preseason game, one day prior to the start of the 2011–12 NBA season. He subsequently returned to the Toros, the Spurs' D-League affiliate team, and played out the 2011–12 season. In 33 games for the Toros, he averaged 8.2 points, 5.0 rebounds and 1.0 assists per game, helping Austin win the 2012 D-League championship.

=== 2012–13 season ===
In July 2012, Zeller joined the San Antonio Spurs for the 2012 NBA Summer League where he averaged 6.7 points and 2.3 rebounds in three games. On September 28, 2012, he signed a partially guaranteed, two-year minimum salary contract with the Phoenix Suns. On October 25, he was named in the Suns' opening-night roster. He made his NBA debut on November 4, recording no stats in just under three minutes of action against the Orlando Magic. The following night, he scored a season-high 7 points in a loss to the Miami Heat. On November 27, he played against the Cleveland Cavaliers and his brother Tyler. He played sparingly for the Suns in 2012–13, appearing in 16 out of a possible 55 games before being waived by the team on February 21, 2013.

=== 2013–14 season ===
On December 27, 2013, Zeller was reacquired by the Austin Toros. He played out the rest of the season with the Toros, averaging 5.3 points, 4.4 rebounds and 1.2 assists in 36 games.

== Career statistics ==
=== NBA ===
Legend
GP	Games played	GS	Games started	MPG	Minutes per game
FG%	Field goal percentage	3P%	3-point field goal percentage	FT%	Free throw percentage
RPG	Rebounds per game	APG	Assists per game	SPG	Steals per game
BPG	Blocks per game	PPG	Points per game	**Bold**	Career high

Year	Team	GP	GS	MPG	FG%	3P%	FT%	RPG	APG	SPG	BPG	PPG
2012–13	Phoenix	16	0	3.6	.346	.200	.000	.6	.2	.0	.0	1.2
**Career**		16	0	3.6	.346	.200	.000	.6	.2	.0	.0	1.2

=== College ===
Year	Team	GP	GS	MPG	FG%	3P%	FT%	RPG	APG	SPG	BPG	PPG
2005–06	Notre Dame	27	9	13.7	.364	.339	.471	**3.1**	**1.0**	.1	.3	3.4
2006–07	Notre Dame	32	**16**	12.4	**.489**	**.395**	**.667**	2.2	.5	.3	**.4**	3.8
2007–08	Notre Dame	33	0	11.8	.426	.381	.538	2.2	.4	**.4**	.2	4.5
2008–09	Notre Dame	**36**	7	**14.6**	.396	.342	.615	2.8	.6	.2	.2	**4.9**
**Career**		128	32	13.2	.417	.360	.574	2.5	.6	.2	.3	4.2

== Personal life ==
Zeller is the son of Steve and Lorri Zeller, the nephew of former NBA player Al Eberhard, and older brother of former NBA players Tyler and Cody.

Awards and achievements
Preceded by A. J. Ratliff	Indiana Mr. Basketball award 2005	Succeeded by Greg Oden
