= Marcin Gortat =

Polish basketball player (born 1984)

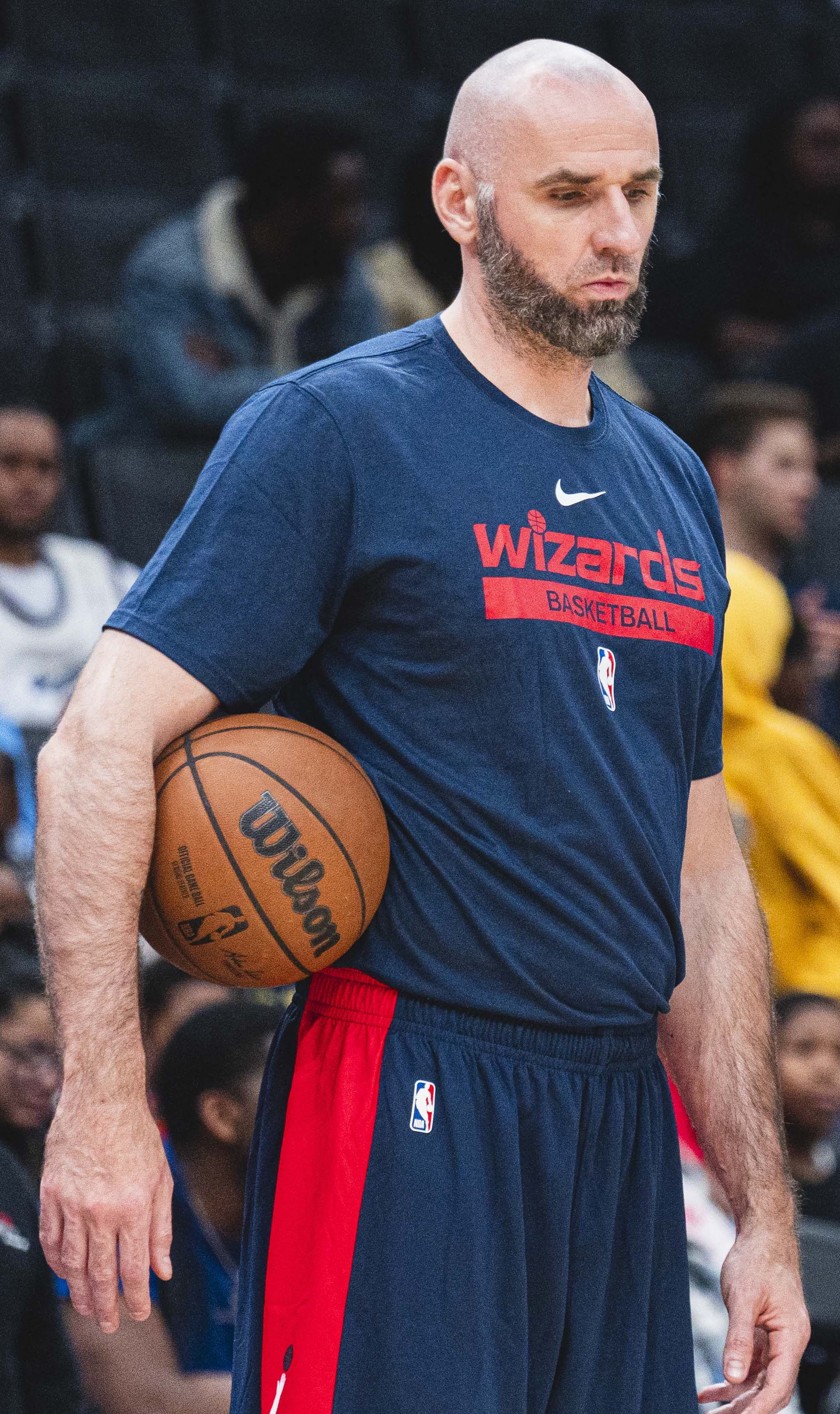
- Gortat at the Washington Wizards Open Practice in 2022

Washington Wizards
- Title: Player development and assistant coach
- League: NBA

Personal information
- Born: February 17, 1984 (age 42) Łódź, Poland
- Listed height: 6 ft 11 in (2.11 m)
- Listed weight: 240 lb (109 kg)

Career information
- NBA draft: 2005: 2nd round, 57th overall pick
- Drafted by: Phoenix Suns
- Playing career: 2002–2020
- Position: Center
- Number: 13, 4

Career history

Playing
- 2002–2003: ŁKS Łódź
- 2003–2007: RheinEnergie Cologne
- 2007–2010: Orlando Magic
- 2007–2008: →Anaheim Arsenal
- 2010–2013: Phoenix Suns
- 2013–2018: Washington Wizards
- 2018–2019: Los Angeles Clippers

Coaching
- 2022–present: Washington Wizards (player development and assistant coach)

Career highlights
- EuroBasket rebounding leader (2009); German League champion (2006); 3× German Cup champion (2004, 2005, 2007); German Champions Cup champion (2006)

Career statistics
- Points: 7,951 (9.9 ppg)
- Rebounds: 6,407 (7.9 rpg)
- Assists: 915 (1.1 apg)
- Stats at NBA.com
- Stats at Basketball Reference

Marcin Janusz Gortat (Polish pronunciation: [ˈmart͡ɕiŋ ˈɡɔrtat]; born February 17, 1984), also known as "the Polish Hammer", or "the Polish Machine", is a Polish former professional basketball player, and current player development and assistant coach at the Washington Wizards of the National Basketball Association (NBA). The 6 ft 11 in (2.11 m), 240 pounds (110 kg) center is the son of boxer Janusz Gortat. He was drafted in the second round by the Phoenix Suns in the 2005 NBA draft and played for the Orlando Magic, Phoenix Suns, Washington Wizards, and Los Angeles Clippers. He retired from professional basketball in 2020.

== Early life and career ==
As a child, Gortat participated in football and track and field, where he competed in the high jump. His father, Janusz, was a Polish boxer and a bronze medalist in the light heavyweight class during the Munich 1972 and Montreal 1976 Olympics, and his mother, Alicja, was a representative of the Poland national team in volleyball. He has an older brother, Robert, who is also a boxer.

Gortat grew up in Łódź, Poland, together with his brother Filip. He graduated from Technical School in Łódź. Apart from Polish, he is fluent in English, German, and Serbian. Gortat is also a big Motorcycle Speedway supporter, often seen supporting Polish club Motor Lublin. He is also seen regularly at Speedway Grand Prix events, supporting his good friend, four-time World Champion Bartosz Zmarzlik.

Gortat started his career with ŁKS Łódź, then played three seasons for RheinEnergie Cologne in Germany's Basketball Bundesliga, with whom he won the domestic championship in 2006 as well as the national cup three times. He also played in the 2006–07 Euroleague season for the first time in the team's history. After being drafted 57th overall in the 2005 NBA draft by the Phoenix Suns (with his rights later traded to the Orlando Magic), Gortat elected to keep playing with Cologne in Germany until 2007.

== NBA career ==
=== Orlando Magic (2007–2010) ===
On August 2, 2007, Gortat signed with the Orlando Magic. On November 20, he was assigned to the Anaheim Arsenal of the NBA Development League. He was recalled from the D-League on December 2, and debuted for the Magic on March 1, 2008, against the New York Knicks.

On April 16, 2008, in the Magic's last game of the 2007–08 season, little-used Gortat played 28 minutes and registered 12 points and 11 rebounds in a 103–83 Magic win over the Washington Wizards. On December 15, 2008, starting in place of the injured Dwight Howard, Gortat played 28 minutes and recorded 16 points and 13 rebounds in a 108–98 win over the Golden State Warriors. On April 13, 2009, again starting in place of Howard, Gortat played almost 43 minutes and topped his career high in rebounding with 18 rebounds and had 10 points. On April 30, 2009, Gortat made his first playoff start in Game 6 against the Philadelphia 76ers, replacing Howard, who was suspended because of his actions in game 5. He had 11 points and 15 rebounds as the Magic eliminated the 76ers 4–2. That Magic playoff run continued all the way to the NBA Finals, making Gortat the first Polish-born player to ever appear in the championship series.

On July 8, 2009, Gortat, a restricted free agent, signed an offer sheet for five years and $34 million with the Dallas Mavericks. However, Orlando prevented Gortat from going to Dallas by matching the offer sheet on July 13, 2009. Gortat was said to be "very disappointed" to stay with the Magic, since continuing as backup to Dwight Howard would mean limited playing time, whereas playing for Dallas would likely have meant being the starting center.

=== Phoenix Suns (2010–2013) ===
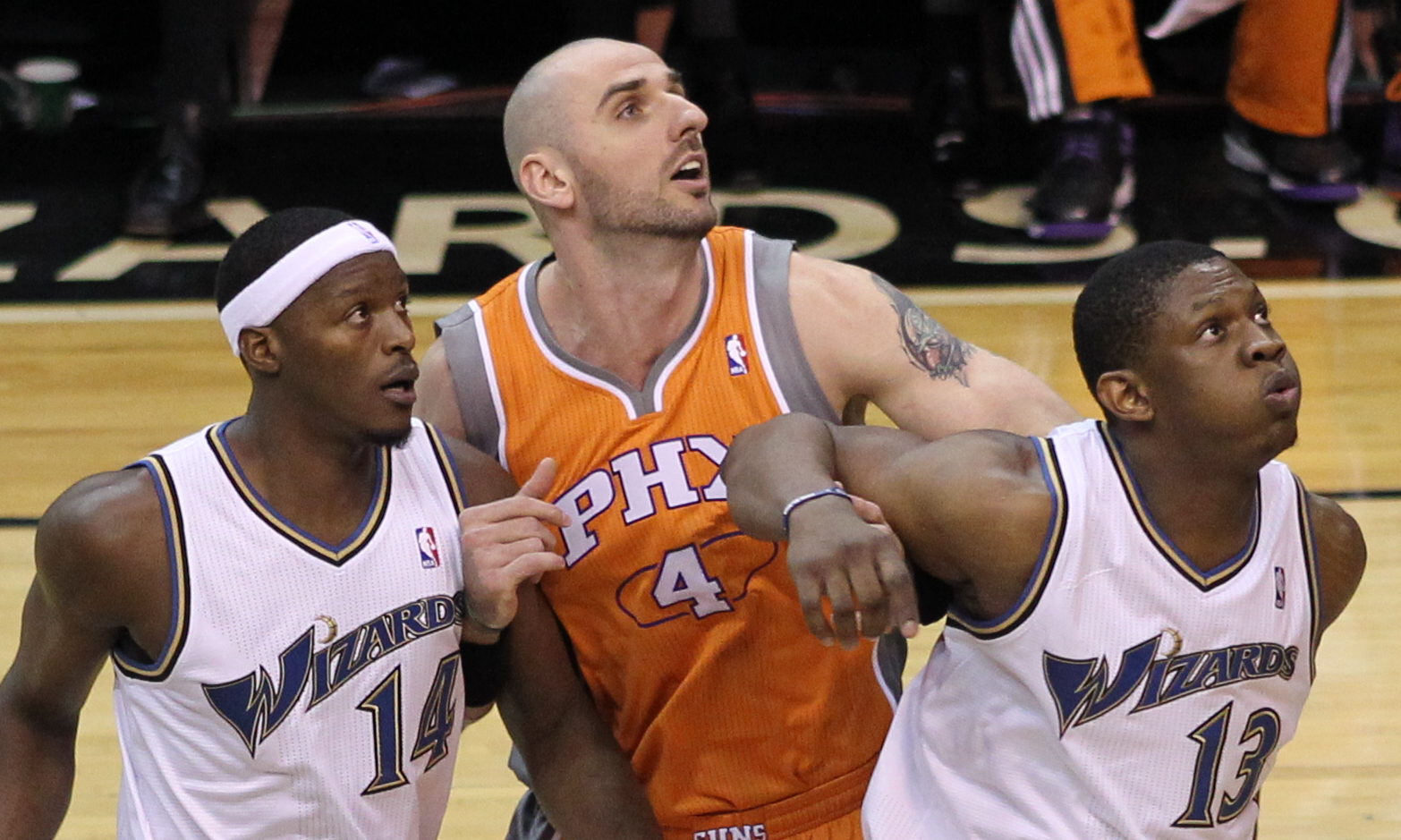
Gortat battling for a rebound during his tenure with the Suns

On December 18, 2010, Gortat was traded to the Phoenix Suns along with Vince Carter, Mickaël Piétrus, a 2011 first-round draft pick (which would become Nikola Mirotić), and $3 million, in exchange for Jason Richardson, Earl Clark, and then-former Magic player and former teammate Hedo Türkoğlu. Due to Steve Nash wearing the #13 jersey, which was the number that Gortat had worn in Orlando and Poland, he decided to wear #4 for his tenure with the Suns. During his first season with the Suns, his numbers increased as his minutes grew, initially coming off the bench, then starting at center in place of Robin Lopez. During his time in Phoenix, Gortat continued to be known as "the Polish Hammer" a nickname originally given to him during his time with the Orlando Magic.

During the lockout-shortened 2011–12 season, Gortat averaged 15.4 points and 10.0 rebounds per game. He was the only Suns player to start and play every game of the regular season. Gortat also joined the likes of former Magic teammate Dwight Howard, Andrew Bynum, and DeMarcus Cousins as the only centers to average a double-double that season. After the season ended, he was named to the Polish national basketball team for the FIBA EuroBasket 2013 qualification round. In the second game against Finland, he scored 27 points and grabbed 21 rebounds to help Poland qualify for 2013's FIBA Eurobasket tournament.

On November 7, 2012, he scored 23 points, grabbed 10 rebounds, and had a career-best 7 blocks in a 117–110 victory against the Charlotte Bobcats. In late February, Gortat suffered a knee injury, and was left off the team for the rest of the season.

=== Washington Wizards (2013–2018) ===
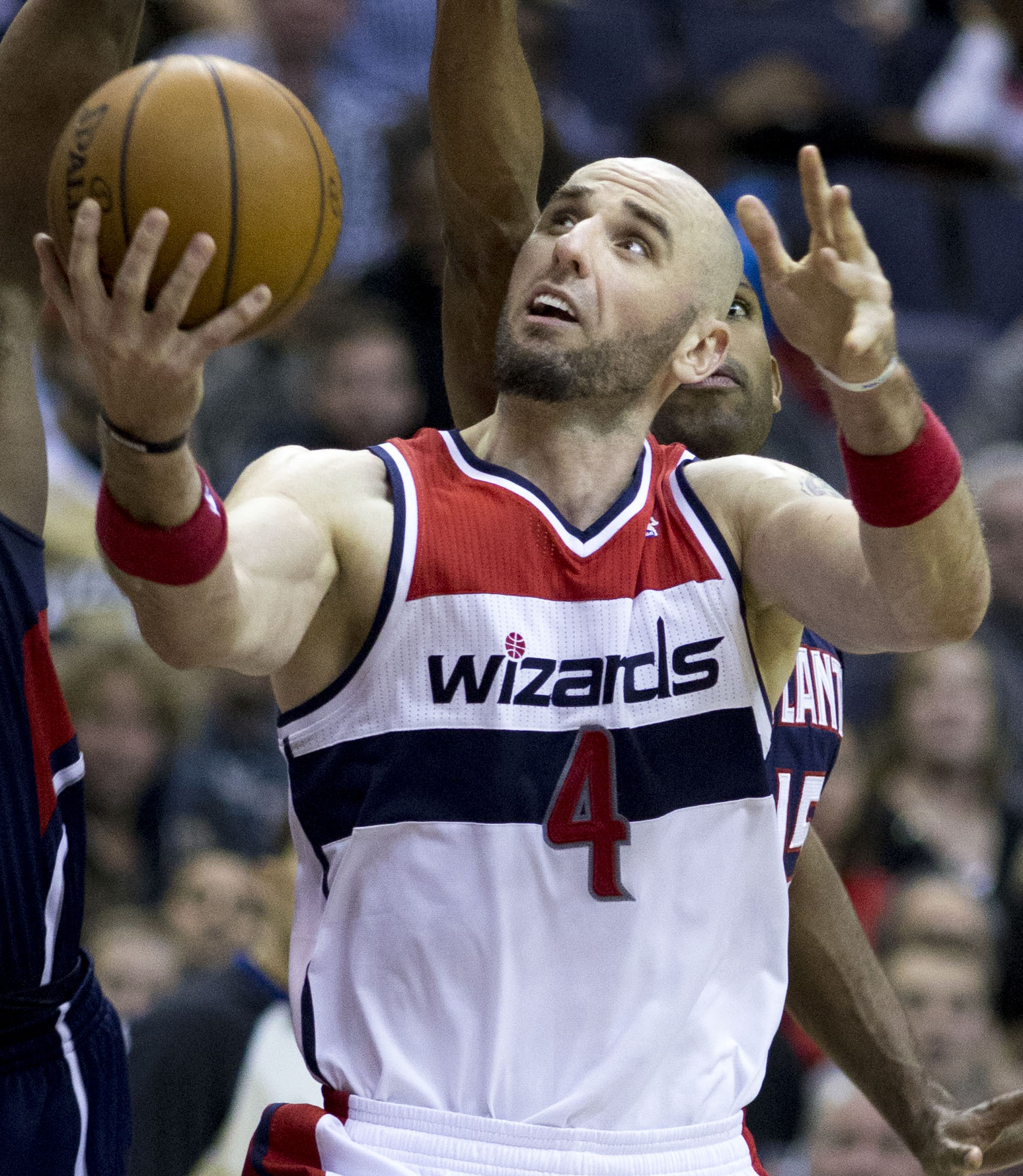
Gortat in 2013

On October 25, 2013, Gortat was traded, along with Shannon Brown, Malcolm Lee, and Kendall Marshall, to the Washington Wizards in exchange for Emeka Okafor and a 2014 protected first-round draft pick.

On February 27, 2014, Gortat recorded a career-high 31 points and 12 rebounds in a 134–129 triple overtime win over the Toronto Raptors. On May 13, he recorded 31 points (his playoff career high) and 16 rebounds to help the Wizards avoid elimination in Game 5 of their second-round series with the Indiana Pacers. He became the first Wizards player with at least 30 points and 15 rebounds in a playoff game since Moses Malone in 1987.

On July 10, 2014, Gortat re-signed with the Wizards to a reported five-year, $60 million contract.

On December 28, 2015, Gortat was named Eastern Conference Player of the Week for games played December 21–27, earning the honor for the first time in his career. On February 29, 2016, he scored 13 of his 18 points in the fourth quarter and grabbed a career-high 20 rebounds in the Wizards' 116–108 win over the Philadelphia 76ers.

=== Los Angeles Clippers (2018–2019) ===
On June 26, 2018, Gortat was traded to the Los Angeles Clippers in exchange for Austin Rivers. On January 5, 2019, Gortat recorded a double-double with 18 points and 13 rebounds during a 121–111 win over the Suns. On February 7, he was waived by the Clippers.

On February 16, 2020, Gortat officially announced his retirement from basketball.

=== Back to Washington Wizards as assistant coach ===
In October 2022, he joined the Wizards as temporary assistant coach.

Gortat brought Polish Heritage Night (Polish: Polska Noc w NBA) back to the NBA for the first time since retiring. The 9th edition of this event will celebrate Polish heritage when Washington hosts the San Antonio Spurs with another Pole, Jeremy Sochan on the roster on March 24, 2023.

== Controversies ==
=== Incidents with the Washington Wizards ===
In December 2014, Gortat received an official warning from the NBA for violating the league's anti-flopping rules, which prohibit players from simulating or exaggerating contact with an opponent in an attempt to influence an official's decision. The incident occurred on December 14 during a game between the Washington Wizards and the Utah Jazz. On March 18, 2015, again in a game against the Jazz, the league ruled that Gortat had committed a second such violation during the same season. The following day, the NBA fined him $5,000. Commenting on the matter later, Gortat emphasized the importance of the team's victory and suggested that the result of the game mattered more to him than the fine.

In November 2016, following the Wizards' 95–106 loss to the Chicago Bulls, Gortat publicly criticized his team's reserve players, stating that Washington had one of the worst benches in the league. His remarks were criticized because they were made publicly and were seen as potentially contributing to tensions within the team. Gortat subsequently apologized to his teammates during a team meeting. Head coach Scott Brooks stressed that the Wizards were one team and should not be divided into starters and reserves.

In February 2018, a public disagreement arose between Gortat and Wizards leader John Wall. During Wall's absence due to injury, the team recorded a series of strong results, and after one of the victories Gortat highlighted the team's collective effort on social media. Wall interpreted the comment as a reference to himself and responded publicly. Gortat denied that he had intended to attack his teammate, but the dispute led to a public exchange of comments concerning the atmosphere within the team. A few days later, the two players held a meeting aimed at resolving their differences.

=== TVP Wiadomości segment concerning the Visa Waiver Program ===
In November 2019, Gortat appeared in a segment of TVP's Wiadomości concerning Poland's inclusion in the United States Visa Waiver Program. The person featured in the report in connection with one of the first flights following the change in regulations was Marcin Bakalarski, who, as media outlets subsequently reported, was a TVP employee and a former activist of Law and Justice. This led to allegations that the report had been staged in advance. Gortat rejected such suggestions and referred to people accusing him of participating in a "setup" as "idi*ts", which itself became the subject of criticism.

=== Dispute with Radosław Piesiewicz and the Polish Basketball Association ===
Around the turn of 2019 and 2020, Gortat's public conflict with Radosław Piesiewicz, then-president of the Polish Basketball Association, intensified. Following the Polish national team's strong performance at the 2019 FIBA Basketball World Cup, Gortat repeatedly criticized both some of the team's performances and the way Polish basketball was managed. During the Polish Sports Champions Gala in January 2020, Piesiewicz, while accepting an award on behalf of the national team, stated that a leader should be a leader on the court rather than on social media; the remark was interpreted by the media as a reference to Gortat. The former basketball player responded by calling Piesiewicz a "careerist".

=== WojewódzkiKędzierski podcast ===
==== Residents of rural Poland ====
On June 3, 2025, during an appearance on the WojewódzkiKędzierski podcast following the second round of the 2025 Polish presidential election, which was won by Karol Nawrocki, Gortat, who had previously publicly supported Rafał Trzaskowski, criticized the influence of residents of rural areas and smaller towns on the election result.

His remarks were criticized as disparaging toward part of the electorate; among those who publicly responded was Law and Justice politician Przemysław Czarnek.

==== Multiplication table and the Baptism of Poland ====
During the same podcast, Gortat was given a series of short questions testing his general knowledge. He was unable to give the date of the Baptism of Poland, identify the author of the Polish novel Nad Niemnem, or answer a question asking for the result of 7 × 9, which is 63. In response to the last question, he exclaimed "Oh Jesus and Mary", after which host Kuba Wojewódzki gave him the correct answer. The excerpt from the interview was subsequently widely discussed in the media, particularly in the context of Gortat's simultaneous involvement in public commentary on social and political issues.

Among those who publicly commented on the incident was Marcin Najman, who criticized Gortat for speaking out on public issues while at the same time displaying gaps in basic knowledge. In the following months, questions concerning the multiplication table were repeatedly used by his critics as references to the appearance.

== Personal life ==
Gortat identifies as a Catholic and has said that his faith gives him hope and inspires him.

In an interview in 2011, Gortat said he preferred his original nickname, "The Polish Machine" to "The Polish Hammer" because when he started out as a pro in Germany a coach told him he "worked like a machine", and a teammate converted that into a nickname. In 2019, he began a relationship with political scientist Żaneta Stanisławska, whom he married in the spring of 2021. He is stepfather to his wife's daughter from her previous marriage. In 2026, he had a son, whom he named Marcin Junior.

== Career statistics ==
Legend
| GP | Games played | GS | Games started | MPG | Minutes per game |
| FG% | Field-goal percentage | 3P% | 3-point field-goal percentage | FT% | Free-throw percentage |
| RPG | Rebounds per game | APG | Assists per game | SPG | Steals per game |
| BPG | Blocks per game | PPG | Points per game | PIR | Performance index rating |
| **Bold** | Career high | * | Led the league |

=== NBA ===
==== Regular season ====
| Year | Team | GP | GS | MPG | FG% | 3P% | FT% | RPG | APG | SPG | BPG | PPG |
|---|---|---|---|---|---|---|---|---|---|---|---|---|
| 2007–08 | Orlando | 6 | 0 | 6.8 | .471 | — | .667 | 2.7 | .3 | .2 | .2 | 3.0 |
| 2008–09 | Orlando | 63 | 3 | 12.6 | .569 | **1.000** | .578 | 4.6 | .2 | .3 | .8 | 3.8 |
| 2009–10 | Orlando | 81 | 0 | 13.4 | .533 | .000 | .680 | 4.2 | .2 | .2 | .9 | 3.6 |
| 2010–11 | Orlando | 25 | 2 | 15.8 | .543 | — | .667 | 4.7 | .7 | .3 | .8 | 4.0 |
| 2010–11 | Phoenix | 55 | 12 | 29.7 | .563 | .250 | **.731** | 9.3 | 1.0 | .5 | 1.3 | 13.0 |
| 2011–12 | Phoenix | 66* | 66* | 32.0 | .555 | .000 | .649 | 10.0 | .9 | **.7** | 1.5 | **15.4** |
| 2012–13 | Phoenix | 61 | 61 | 30.8 | .521 | .000 | .652 | 8.5 | 1.2 | **.7** | **1.6** | 11.1 |
| 2013–14 | Washington | 81 | 80 | **32.8** | .542 | **1.000** | .686 | 9.5 | **1.7** | .5 | 1.5 | 13.2 |
| 2014–15 | Washington | **82** | **82*** | 29.9 | .566 | .000 | .703 | 8.7 | 1.2 | .6 | 1.3 | 12.2 |
| 2015–16 | Washington | 75 | 74 | 30.1 | .567 | .000 | .705 | 9.9 | 1.4 | .6 | 1.3 | 13.5 |
| 2016–17 | Washington | **82*** | **82*** | 31.2 | **.579** | .000 | .648 | **10.3** | 1.5 | .5 | .7 | 10.8 |
| 2017–18 | Washington | **82*** | **82*** | 25.3 | .518 | — | .675 | 7.6 | 1.8 | .5 | .7 | 8.4 |
| 2018–19 | L.A. Clippers | 47 | 43 | 16.0 | .532 | — | .729 | 5.6 | 1.4 | .1 | .5 | 5.0 |
| Career | | 806 | 587 | 25.7 | .551 | .150 | .680 | 8.0 | 1.1 | .5 | 1.1 | 9.9 |

==== Playoffs ====
| Year | Team | GP | GS | MPG | FG% | 3P% | FT% | RPG | APG | SPG | BPG | PPG |
|---|---|---|---|---|---|---|---|---|---|---|---|---|
| 2008 | Orlando | 8 | 0 | 6.0 | **.833** | — | .000 | 1.0 | .0 | .0 | .5 | 1.3 |
| 2009 | Orlando | **24** | 1 | 11.3 | .654 | — | .625 | 3.2 | .1 | .4 | .6 | 3.3 |
| 2010 | Orlando | 14 | 0 | 15.1 | .654 | — | **.727** | 4.4 | .6 | .2 | .3 | 3.0 |
| 2014 | Washington | 11 | 11 | **34.7** | .429 | — | .659 | 9.9 | 1.5 | .5 | 1.4 | **13.0** |
| 2015 | Washington | 10 | 10 | 30.7 | .628 | — | .667 | 8.8 | **2.2** | **.6** | 1.1 | 12.4 |
| 2017 | Washington | 13 | **13** | 31.5 | .505 | — | .611 | **11.0** | 1.8 | .4 | **1.5** | 8.1 |
| 2018 | Washington | 6 | 6 | 26.7 | .558 | — | .571 | 6.3 | 1.0 | .0 | .3 | 8.7 |
| Career | | 86 | 41 | 20.8 | .564 | — | .650 | 6.1 | .9 | .3 | .8 | 6.4 |

=== Euroleague ===
| Year | Team | GP | GS | MPG | FG% | 3P% | FT% | RPG | APG | SPG | BPG | PPG | PIR |
|---|---|---|---|---|---|---|---|---|---|---|---|---|---|
| 2006–07 | RheinEnergie Cologne | 14 | 14 | 27.7 | .594 | .500 | .667 | 5.6 | 1.2 | 1.1 | 1.1 | 10.4 | 12.6 |
| Career | | 14 | 14 | 27.7 | .594 | .500 | .667 | 5.6 | 1.2 | 1.1 | 1.1 | 10.4 | 12.6 |

== See also ==
- List of NBA career field goal percentage leaders
- List of European basketball players in the United States
