= 2020–21 Phoenix Suns season =

Professional basketball season

- Conference champions
- Division champions
- Head coach: Monty Williams
- General manager: James Jones
- Owners: Robert Sarver
- Arena: Footprint Center (Note: Known as the PHX Arena from November 6–30, 2020 during the off-season, after Talking Stick Resort lost the naming rights, and was later renamed the Phoenix Suns Arena on December 1, 2020, before the start of the season. On July 16, 2021, during the 2021 NBA Finals, the arena adopted its current name after Footprint acquired the naming rights.)

Results
- Record: 51–21 (.708)
- Place: Division: 1st (Pacific); Conference: 2nd (Western)
- Playoff finish: NBA Finals (lost to Bucks 2–4)
- Stats at Basketball Reference

Local media
- Television: Bally Sports Arizona (Note: Formerly known as Fox Sports Arizona until March 31, 2021.)
- Radio: KTAR

The 2020–21 Phoenix Suns season was their 53rd season as a franchise in the National Basketball Association (NBA), as well as their 28th season at the Footprint Center. The Suns achieved their first winning season since the 2013–14 season after a 134–106 win over the Washington Wizards on April 10, 2021. The Suns then clinched a playoff berth for the first time since 2010 following a 109–101 win over the Los Angeles Clippers on April 28, 2021. They also clinched the Pacific Division for the first time since 2007. They finished 51–21, with a winning percentage that, in a full 82-game season, would be equivalent to 58 wins.

In the first round, the Suns defeated the No. 7 seeded and defending NBA champion Los Angeles Lakers in six games and the No. 3 seeded Denver Nuggets in four games in the Western Conference semifinals. The Phoenix Suns defeated the No. 4 seeded Los Angeles Clippers (Chris Paul's former team) in the Western Conference finals in six games to advance to their first NBA Finals appearance in 28 years. However, they lost to the Milwaukee Bucks in six games despite taking a 2–0 lead.

As of 2026, Devin Booker is the only remaining player on the Suns from the 2020-21 roster.

== Off-season ==
=== Draft ===
Round	Pick	Player	Position(s)	Nationality	College / Club
1	10	Jalen Smith	Power forward	United States	Maryland

=== Coaching changes ===
On September 8, 2020, nearly two months after firing Steve Blake and Larry Greer during the 2020 NBA Bubble period (which led to Larry joining his older brother Andy on the New York Knicks as assistant coaches there soon afterward), the Suns hired former Minnesota Timberwolves player development coach Brian Randle as one of the incoming assistant coach replacements, taking on Steve Blake's apparent position with the team. In addition to that move, their Director of Athletic Performance, Daniel Bove, announced his hiring by the New Orleans Pelicans for that exact position there on his Twitter account after helping the team go undefeated in the 2020 NBA Bubble. Five days after the announced signing, the Memphis Grizzlies announced the hiring of assistant coach Darko Rajaković going forward for this season, leaving Phoenix to search for his replacement. On October 9, the Suns hired former Philadelphia 76ers assistant coach Kevin Young (who was an assistant alongside Monty Williams during his time in Philadelphia and was once considered a head coach candidate for the 76ers) as their second (and final) new assistant coach hiring of the season, replacing Rajaković's position going forward.

=== Front office changes ===
On July 31, 2020, in a period that would normally be considered a part of this season before the COVID-19 pandemic in the United States began, the Suns fired 30 different employees for varying reasons that affected overall team performance, especially by being considered either redundant or outdated for the team. Four months later, on Halloween 2020, Suns co-owner Richard J. Heckmann died at 76 years old due to complications relating to multiple system atrophy, though his passing wasn't confirmed by the team until November 2. During the start of the free agency period on November 20, NBA officials confirmed that 30 more Suns employees were furloughed, with many of those employees that are still with the organization having to take a 5%-20% pay cut for this season, both of which were due to the economic impact of the COVID-19 recession.

== Roster ==
2020–21 Phoenix Suns roster
Players

Pos.	No.	Player	Height	Weight	DOB	From
G	0	Ty-Shon Alexander (TW)	6 ft 3 in (1.91 m)	195 lb (88 kg)	1998-07-16	Creighton
C	22	Deandre Ayton	7 ft 1 in (2.16 m)	250 lb (113 kg)	1998-07-23	Arizona
G	1	Devin Booker	6 ft 5 in (1.96 m)	206 lb (93 kg)	1996-10-30	Kentucky
F	25	Mikal Bridges	6 ft 6 in (1.98 m)	209 lb (95 kg)	1996-08-30	Villanova
G	4	Jevon Carter	6 ft 1 in (1.85 m)	200 lb (91 kg)	1995-09-14	West Virginia
F	12	Torrey Craig	6 ft 7 in (2.01 m)	221 lb (100 kg)	1990-12-19	USC Upstate
F	99	Jae Crowder	6 ft 6 in (1.98 m)	235 lb (107 kg)	1990-07-06	Marquette
G	2	Langston Galloway	6 ft 1 in (1.85 m)	200 lb (91 kg)	1991-12-09	Saint Joseph's
F	23	Cameron Johnson	6 ft 9 in (2.06 m)	210 lb (95 kg)	1996-03-03	North Carolina
F/C	8	Frank Kaminsky	7 ft 0 in (2.13 m)	240 lb (109 kg)	1993-04-04	Wisconsin
G	55	E'Twaun Moore	6 ft 3 in (1.91 m)	191 lb (87 kg)	1989-02-25	Purdue
F	11	Abdel Nader	6 ft 5 in (1.96 m)	225 lb (102 kg)	1993-09-25	Iowa State
G	3	Chris Paul	6 ft 0 in (1.83 m)	175 lb (79 kg)	1985-05-06	Wake Forest
G	15	Cameron Payne	6 ft 1 in (1.85 m)	183 lb (83 kg)	1994-08-08	Murray State
F	20	Dario Šarić (injured)	6 ft 11 in (2.11 m)	225 lb (102 kg)	1994-04-08	Croatia
F	10	Jalen Smith	6 ft 10 in (2.08 m)	215 lb (98 kg)	2000-03-16	Maryland

Coaches
Head coach
- Monty Williams
Assistant(s)
- Randy Ayers
- Mark Bryant
- Willie Green
- Brian Randle
- Kevin Young

Legend
- (DP) Unsigned draft pick
- (FA) Free agent
- (S) Suspended
- (GL) On assignment to G League affiliate
- (TW) Two-way affiliate player
- Injured

Roster
Updated: March 18, 2021

== Preseason ==
2020 preseason game log
Total: 0–4 (home: 0–2; road: 0–2)
Preseason: 0–4 (home: 0–2; road: 0–2)

Game	Date	Team	Score	High points	High rebounds	High assists	Location Attendance	Record
1	December 12	@ Utah	L 105–119	Langston Galloway (17)	Deandre Ayton (14)	Devin Booker, Jevon Carter (6)	Vivint Smart Home Arena; 585 (Limited Seating)	0–1
2	December 14	@ Utah	L 92–111	Devin Booker (27)	Deandre Ayton (9)	Chris Paul (6)	Vivint Smart Home Arena; 1,084 (Limited Seating)	0–2
3	December 16	L.A. Lakers	L 107–112	Deandre Ayton (21)	Deandre Ayton (9)	Chris Paul (8)	Phoenix Suns Arena; Closed off arena	0–3
4	December 18	L.A. Lakers	L 113–114	Devin Booker (27)	Jalen Smith (8)	Jevon Carter (6)	Phoenix Suns Arena; Closed off arena	0–4

2020–21 season schedule

== Regular season ==
=== Game log ===
2020–21 game log
Total: 51–21 (home: 27–9; road: 24–12)
December: 4–1 (home: 2–0; road: 2–1)

Game	Date	Team	Score	High points	High rebounds	High assists	Location Attendance	Record
1	December 23	Dallas	W 106–102	Devin Booker (22)	Jae Crowder (9)	Chris Paul (5)	Phoenix Suns Arena; Closed off arena	1–0
2	December 26	@ Sacramento	L 103–106	Devin Booker (26)	Deandre Ayton (12)	Chris Paul (12)	Golden 1 Center; Closed off arena	1–1
3	December 27	@ Sacramento	W 116–100	Mikal Bridges (22)	Deandre Ayton (15)	Chris Paul (12)	Golden 1 Center; Closed off arena	2–1
4	December 29	New Orleans	W 111–86	Jae Crowder (21)	Deandre Ayton (12)	Chris Paul (9)	Phoenix Suns Arena; Closed off arena	3–1
5	December 31	@ Utah	W 106–95	Devin Booker (25)	Deandre Ayton (9)	Devin Booker (7)	Vivint Smart Home Arena; 1,932 (Limited Seating)	4–1

January: 6–7 (home: 2–4; road: 4–3)

Game	Date	Team	Score	High points	High rebounds	High assists	Location Attendance	Record
6	January 1	@ Denver	W 106–103	Deandre Ayton, Devin Booker (22)	Deandre Ayton (11)	Chris Paul (6)	Ball Arena; Closed off arena	5–1
7	January 3	L. A. Clippers	L 107–112	Devin Booker (25)	Chris Paul (9)	Devin Booker (8)	Phoenix Suns Arena; Closed off arena	5–2
8	January 6	Toronto	W 123–115	Devin Booker (24)	Deandre Ayton (16)	Cameron Payne (10)	Phoenix Suns Arena; Closed off arena	6–2
9	January 8	@ Detroit	L 105–110 (OT)	Devin Booker (23)	Deandre Ayton (11)	Chris Paul (9)	Little Caesars Arena; Closed off arena	6–3
10	January 9	@ Indiana	W 125–117	Mikal Bridges (34)	Deandre Ayton (14)	Chris Paul (10)	Bankers Life Fieldhouse; Closed off arena	7–3
11	January 11	@ Washington	L 107–128	Devin Booker (33)	Deandre Ayton, Jae Crowder, Dario Šarić (6)	Chris Paul (11)	Capital One Arena; Closed off arena	7–4
—	January 13	Atlanta	Postponed due to the COVID-19 pandemic (Make-up Date: March 30, 2021)					
—	January 15	Golden State	Postponed due to the COVID-19 pandemic (Make-up Date: March 4, 2021)					
—	January 16	Indiana	Postponed due to the COVID-19 pandemic (Make-up Date: March 13, 2021)					
12	January 18	@ Memphis	L 104–108	Deandre Ayton (18)	Deandre Ayton (16)	Chris Paul (7)	FedExForum; 204 (Limited Seating)	7–5
13	January 20	@ Houston	W 109–103	Deandre Ayton (26)	Deandre Ayton (17)	Mikal Bridges, Cameron Payne (5)	Toyota Center; 3,022 (Limited Seating)	8–5
14	January 22	Denver	L 126–130 (OT)	Devin Booker (31)	Deandre Ayton (13)	Chris Paul (15)	Phoenix Suns Arena; Closed off arena	8–6
15	January 23	Denver	L 112–120 (2OT)	Chris Paul, Jae Crowder (21)	Deandre Ayton (13)	Chris Paul (13)	Phoenix Suns Arena; Closed off arena	8–7
16	January 27	Oklahoma City	L 97–102	Chris Paul (32)	Deandre Ayton (14)	Chris Paul (5)	Phoenix Suns Arena; Closed off arena	8–8
17	January 28	Golden State	W 114–93	Mikal Bridges (20)	Deandre Ayton, Frank Kaminsky III (13)	Frank Kaminsky III (8)	Phoenix Suns Arena; Closed off arena	9–8
18	January 30	@ Dallas	W 111–105	Chris Paul (29)	Deandre Ayton (17)	Chris Paul (12)	American Airlines Center; Closed off arena	10–8

February: 12–3 (home: 7–2; road: 5–1)

Game	Date	Team	Score	High points	High rebounds	High assists	Location Attendance	Record
19	February 1	@ Dallas	W 109–108	Chris Paul (34)	Deandre Ayton (17)	Chris Paul (9)	American Airlines Center; Closed off arena	11–8
20	February 3	@ New Orleans	L 101–123	Devin Booker (25)	Deandre Ayton (11)	Jevon Carter (5)	Smoothie King Center; 1,440 (Limited Seating)	11–9
21	February 5	Detroit	W 109–92	Devin Booker (23)	Deandre Ayton (13)	Chris Paul (9)	Phoenix Suns Arena; Closed off arena	12–9
22	February 7	Boston	W 100–91	Mikal Bridges (19)	Deandre Ayton (11)	Devin Booker (11)	Phoenix Suns Arena; 1,493 (Limited Seating)	13–9
23	February 8	Cleveland	W 119–113	Devin Booker (36)	Deandre Ayton (16)	Devin Booker (8)	Phoenix Suns Arena; 1,485 (Limited Seating)	14–9
24	February 10	Milwaukee	W 125–124	Devin Booker (30)	Jae Crowder (14)	Frank Kaminsky III (8)	Phoenix Suns Arena; 1,491 (Limited Seating)	15–9
25	February 13	Philadelphia	W 120–111	Devin Booker (36)	Chris Paul (8)	Chris Paul (10)	Phoenix Suns Arena; 1,652 (Limited Seating)	16–9
26	February 14	Orlando	W 109–90	Devin Booker (27)	Deandre Ayton (13)	Chris Paul (9)	Phoenix Suns Arena; 1,732 (Limited Seating)	17–9
27	February 16	Brooklyn	L 124–128	Chris Paul (29)	Deandre Ayton (9)	Devin Booker, Chris Paul (7)	Phoenix Suns Arena; 3,181 (Limited Seating)	17–10
28	February 19	@ New Orleans	W 132–114	Devin Booker (23)	Deandre Ayton (16)	Chris Paul (19)	Smoothie King Center; 1,940 (Limited Seating)	18–10
29	February 20	@ Memphis	W 128–97	Devin Booker (23)	E'Twaun Moore (7)	Cameron Payne (7)	FedExForum; 1,994 (Limited Seating)	19–10
30	February 22	Portland	W 132–100	Devin Booker (34)	Dario Šarić (9)	Chris Paul (9)	Phoenix Suns Arena; 3,213 (Limited Seating)	20–10
31	February 24	Charlotte	L 121–124	Devin Booker (33)	Deandre Ayton (10)	Chris Paul (10)	Phoenix Suns Arena; 3,296 (Limited Seating)	20–11
32	February 26	@ Chicago	W 106–97	Deandre Ayton, Devin Booker (22)	Deandre Ayton (7)	Chris Paul (15)	United Center; Closed off arena	21–11
33	February 28	@ Minnesota	W 118–99	Devin Booker (43)	Deandre Ayton (10)	Chris Paul (15)	Target Center; Closed off arena	22–11

March: 11–3 (home: 6–2; road: 5–1)

Game	Date	Team	Score	High points	High rebounds	High assists	Location Attendance	Record
34	March 2	@ L. A. Lakers	W 114–104	Dario Šarić (21)	Mikal Bridges (6)	Chris Paul (10)	Staples Center; Closed off arena	23–11
35	March 4	Golden State	W 120–98	Cameron Payne (17)	Deandre Ayton (10)	Cameron Payne (10)	Phoenix Suns Arena; 3,233 (Limited Seating)	24–11
All-Star Game (Season Separator)
36	March 11	@ Portland	W 127–121	Devin Booker (35)	Jae Crowder (7)	Devin Booker (8)	Moda Center; Closed off arena	25–11
37	March 13	Indiana	L 111–122	Devin Booker (20)	Deandre Ayton (12)	Chris Paul (10)	Phoenix Suns Arena; 3,166 (Limited Seating)	25–12
38	March 15	Memphis	W 122–99	Devin Booker (27)	Deandre Ayton (9)	Chris Paul (7)	Phoenix Suns Arena; 3,188 (Limited Seating)	26–12
39	March 18	Minnesota	L 119–123	Devin Booker (35)	Dario Šarić (8)	Mikal Bridges (8)	Phoenix Suns Arena; 3,172 (Limited Seating)	26–13
40	March 19	Minnesota	W 113–101	Chris Paul (20)	Devin Booker (7)	Chris Paul (9)	Phoenix Suns Arena; 3,124 (Limited Seating)	27–13
41	March 21	L. A. Lakers	W 111–94	Deandre Ayton, Devin Booker (26)	Chris Paul (10)	Chris Paul (13)	Phoenix Suns Arena; 3,190 (Limited Seating)	28–13
42	March 23	@ Miami	W 110–100	Devin Booker (23)	Deandre Ayton (16)	Chris Paul (9)	American Airlines Arena; Closed off arena	29–13
43	March 24	@ Orlando	L 111–112	Devin Booker (25)	Deandre Ayton (9)	Devin Booker, Chris Paul (7)	Amway Center; 3,891 (Limited Seating)	29–14
44	March 26	@ Toronto	W 104–100	Deandre Ayton, Chris Paul (19)	Deandre Ayton (9)	Chris Paul (8)	Amalie Arena; Closed off arena	30–14
45	March 28	@ Charlotte	W 101–97 (OT)	Devin Booker (35)	Deandre Ayton (14)	Mikal Bridges, Jae Crowder (4)	Spectrum Center; 3,850 (Limited Seating)	31–14
46	March 30	Atlanta	W 117–110	Devin Booker (21)	Deandre Ayton (14)	Chris Paul (8)	Phoenix Suns Arena; 3,173 (Limited Seating)	32–14
47	March 31	Chicago	W 121–116	Devin Booker (45)	Dario Šarić (5)	Chris Paul (14)	Phoenix Suns Arena; 3,459 (Limited Seating)	33–14

April: 13–4 (home: 10–1; road: 3–3)

Game	Date	Team	Score	High points	High rebounds	High assists	Location Attendance	Record
48	April 2	Oklahoma City	W 140–103	Devin Booker (32)	Deandre Ayton (7)	Chris Paul (12)	Phoenix Suns Arena; 3,422 (Limited Seating)	34–14
49	April 5	@ Houston	W 133–130	Devin Booker (36)	Deandre Ayton (11)	Chris Paul (11)	Toyota Center; 3,093 (Limited Seating)	35–14
50	April 7	Utah	W 117–113 (OT)	Devin Booker (35)	Deandre Ayton, Jae Crowder (12)	Chris Paul (9)	Phoenix Suns Arena; 5,110 (Limited Seating)	36–14
51	April 8	@ L. A. Clippers	L 103–113	Devin Booker (24)	Deandre Ayton (10)	Jae Crowder (4)	Staples Center; Closed off arena	36–15
52	April 10	Washington	W 134–106	Devin Booker (27)	Deandre Ayton (10)	Chris Paul (10)	Phoenix Suns Arena; 5,028 (Limited Seating)	37–15
53	April 12	Houston	W 126–120	Jae Crowder (26)	Deandre Ayton, Devin Booker (7)	Chris Paul (10)	Phoenix Suns Arena; 4,145 (Limited Seating)	38–15
54	April 13	Miami	W 106–86	Deandre Ayton (19)	Deandre Ayton (13)	Chris Paul (9)	Phoenix Suns Arena; 5,024 (Limited Seating)	39–15
55	April 15	Sacramento	W 122–114	Deandre Ayton (26)	Deandre Ayton (11)	Chris Paul (11)	Phoenix Suns Arena; 4,568 (Limited Seating)	40–15
56	April 17	San Antonio	L 85–111	Jevon Carter (17)	Deandre Ayton (9)	Chris Paul (6)	Phoenix Suns Arena; 5,078 (Limited Seating)	40–16
57	April 19	@ Milwaukee	W 128–127 (OT)	Devin Booker (24)	Deandre Ayton (13)	Chris Paul (13)	Fiserv Forum; 3,280 (Limited Seating)	41–16
58	April 21	@ Philadelphia	W 116–113	Chris Paul (28)	Torrey Craig (7)	Chris Paul (8)	Wells Fargo Center; 4,094 (Limited Seating)	42–16
59	April 22	@ Boston	L 86–99	Chris Paul (22)	Deandre Ayton (9)	Chris Paul (8)	TD Garden; 2,298 (Limited Seating)	42–17
60	April 25	@ Brooklyn	L 119–128	Devin Booker (36)	Torrey Craig (14)	Chris Paul (8)	Barclays Center; 1,773 (Limited Seating)	42–18
61	April 26	@ New York	W 118–110	Devin Booker (33)	Deandre Ayton (13)	Chris Paul (6)	Madison Square Garden; 1,981 (Limited Seating)	43–18
62	April 28	L. A. Clippers	W 109–101	Chris Paul (28)	Deandre Ayton (11)	Chris Paul (10)	Phoenix Suns Arena; 5,917 (Limited Seating)	44–18
63	April 30	Utah	W 121–100	Devin Booker (31)	Deandre Ayton (9)	Chris Paul (9)	Phoenix Suns Arena; 6,065 (Limited Seating)	45–18

May: 6–3 (home: 2–0; road: 4–3)

Game	Date	Team	Score	High points	High rebounds	High assists	Location Attendance	Record
64	May 2	@ Oklahoma City	W 123–120	Devin Booker (32)	Torrey Craig (10)	Chris Paul (11)	Chesapeake Energy Arena; Closed off arena	46–18
65	May 4	@ Cleveland	W 134–118 (OT)	Devin Booker (31)	Deandre Ayton (9)	Chris Paul (16)	Rocket Mortgage FieldHouse; 4,148 (Limited Seating)	47–18
66	May 5	@ Atlanta	L 103–135	Devin Booker (30)	Deandre Ayton (8)	Chris Paul (6)	State Farm Arena; 3,205 (Limited Seating)	47–19
67	May 7	New York	W 128–105	Deandre Ayton (26)	Deandre Ayton (15)	Chris Paul (11)	Phoenix Suns Arena; 8,063 (Limited Seating)	48–19
68	May 9	@ L. A. Lakers	L 110–123	Cameron Payne (24)	Ayton, Booker, Kaminsky (6)	Chris Paul (10)	Staples Center; 3,144 (Limited Seating)	48–20
69	May 11	@ Golden State	L 116–122	Devin Booker (34)	Deandre Ayton (8)	Chris Paul (10)	Chase Center; 4,155 (Limited Seating)	48–21
70	May 13	Portland	W 118–117	Chris Paul (26)	Mikal Bridges (11)	Chris Paul (7)	Phoenix Suns Arena; 8,359 (Limited Seating)	49–21
71	May 15	@ San Antonio	W 140–103	Devin Booker (27)	Torrey Craig (9)	Chris Paul (10)	AT&T Center; 4,848 (Limited Seating)	50–21
72	May 16	@ San Antonio	W 123–121	E'Twaun Moore (22)	Carter, Kaminsky, Smith (10)	Jevon Carter (9)	AT&T Center; 4,738 (Limited Seating)	51–21

2020–21 season schedule

== Playoffs ==
=== Game log ===
2021 playoff game log
Total: 14–8 (home: 8–3; road: 6–5)
First Round: 4–2 (home: 2–1; road: 2–1)

Game	Date	Team	Score	High points	High rebounds	High assists	Location Attendance	Series
1	May 23	L. A. Lakers	W 99–90	Devin Booker (34)	Deandre Ayton (16)	Booker, Paul (8)	Phoenix Suns Arena; 11,824	1–0
2	May 25	L. A. Lakers	L 102–109	Devin Booker (31)	Deandre Ayton (10)	Cameron Payne (7)	Phoenix Suns Arena; 11,919	1–1
3	May 27	@ L. A. Lakers	L 95–109	Deandre Ayton (22)	Deandre Ayton (11)	Booker, Paul, Payne (6)	Staples Center; 7,825	1–2
4	May 30	@ L. A. Lakers	W 100–92	Chris Paul (18)	Deandre Ayton (17)	Chris Paul (9)	Staples Center; 8,025	2–2
5	June 1	L. A. Lakers	W 115–85	Devin Booker (30)	Ayton, Booker, Craig (7)	Chris Paul (6)	Phoenix Suns Arena; 16,163	3–2
6	June 3	@ L. A. Lakers	W 113–100	Devin Booker (47)	Devin Booker (11)	Chris Paul (12)	Staples Center; 8,550	4–2

Conference semifinals: 4–0 (home: 2–0; road: 2–0)

Game	Date	Team	Score	High points	High rebounds	High assists	Location Attendance	Series
1	June 7	Denver	W 122–105	Mikal Bridges (23)	Deandre Ayton (10)	Chris Paul (11)	Phoenix Suns Arena; 16,219	1–0
2	June 9	Denver	W 123–98	Devin Booker (18)	Booker, Ayton (10)	Chris Paul (15)	Phoenix Suns Arena; 16,529	2–0
3	June 11	@ Denver	W 116–102	Devin Booker (28)	Deandre Ayton (15)	Chris Paul (8)	Ball Arena; 18,277	3–0
4	June 13	@ Denver	W 125–118	Chris Paul (37)	Devin Booker (11)	Chris Paul (7)	Ball Arena; 18,290	4–0

Conference finals: 4–2 (home: 2–1; road: 2–1)

Game	Date	Team	Score	High points	High rebounds	High assists	Location Attendance	Series
1	June 20	L. A. Clippers	W 120–114	Devin Booker (40)	Devin Booker (13)	Devin Booker (11)	Phoenix Suns Arena; 16,583	1–0
2	June 22	L. A. Clippers	W 104–103	Cameron Payne (29)	Deandre Ayton (14)	Cameron Payne (9)	Phoenix Suns Arena; 16,645	2–0
3	June 24	@ L. A. Clippers	L 92–106	Deandre Ayton (18)	Deandre Ayton (9)	Chris Paul (12)	Staples Center; 17,222	2–1
4	June 26	@ L. A. Clippers	W 84–80	Devin Booker (25)	Deandre Ayton (22)	Chris Paul (7)	Staples Center; 18,222	3–1
5	June 28	L. A. Clippers	L 102–116	Devin Booker (31)	Deandre Ayton (11)	Chris Paul (8)	Phoenix Suns Arena; 16,664	3–2
6	June 30	@ L. A. Clippers	W 130–103	Chris Paul (41)	Deandre Ayton (17)	Chris Paul (8)	Staples Center; 18,495	4–2

NBA Finals: 2–4 (home: 2–1; road: 0–3)

Game	Date	Team	Score	High points	High rebounds	High assists	Location Attendance	Series
1	July 6	Milwaukee	W 118–105	Chris Paul (32)	Deandre Ayton (19)	Chris Paul (9)	Phoenix Suns Arena; 16,557	1–0
2	July 8	Milwaukee	W 118–108	Devin Booker (31)	Deandre Ayton (11)	Chris Paul (8)	Phoenix Suns Arena; 16,583	2–0
3	July 11	@ Milwaukee	L 100–120	Chris Paul (19)	Deandre Ayton (9)	Chris Paul (9)	Fiserv Forum; 16,637	2–1
4	July 14	@ Milwaukee	L 103–109	Devin Booker (42)	Deandre Ayton (17)	Chris Paul (7)	Fiserv Forum; 16,911	2–2
5	July 17	Milwaukee	L 119–123	Devin Booker (40)	Deandre Ayton (10)	Chris Paul (11)	Footprint Center; 16,562	2–3
6	July 20	@ Milwaukee	L 98–105	Chris Paul (26)	Jae Crowder (13)	Booker, Paul (5)	Fiserv Forum; 17,397	2–4

2021 playoff schedule

== Standings ==
=== Division ===
Pacific Division	W	L	PCT	GB	Home	Road	Div	GP
y – Phoenix Suns	51	21	.708	–	27‍–‍9	24‍–‍12	7–5	72
x – Los Angeles Clippers	47	25	.653	4.0	26‍–‍10	21‍–‍15	9–3	72
x – Los Angeles Lakers	42	30	.583	9.0	21‍–‍15	21‍–‍15	4–8	72
pi – Golden State Warriors	39	33	.542	12.0	25‍–‍11	14‍–‍22	5–7	72
Sacramento Kings	31	41	.431	20.0	16‍–‍20	15‍–‍21	5–7	72

=== Conference ===
Western Conference
#	Team	W	L	PCT	GB	GP
1	z – Utah Jazz *	52	20	.722	–	72
2	y – Phoenix Suns *	51	21	.708	1.0	72
3	x – Denver Nuggets	47	25	.653	5.0	72
4	x – Los Angeles Clippers	47	25	.653	5.0	72
5	y – Dallas Mavericks *	42	30	.583	10.0	72
6	x – Portland Trail Blazers	42	30	.583	10.0	72
7	x – Los Angeles Lakers	42	30	.583	10.0	72
8	pi – Golden State Warriors	39	33	.542	13.0	72
9	x – Memphis Grizzlies	38	34	.528	14.0	72
10	pi – San Antonio Spurs	33	39	.458	19.0	72
11	New Orleans Pelicans	31	41	.431	21.0	72
12	Sacramento Kings	31	41	.431	21.0	72
13	Minnesota Timberwolves	23	49	.319	29.0	72
14	Oklahoma City Thunder	22	50	.306	30.0	72
15	Houston Rockets	17	55	.236	35.0	72

Notes

- z – Clinched home court advantage for the entire playoffs
- y – Clinched division title
- x – Clinched playoff spot
- * – Division leader

== Awards ==
=== Week/Month ===
- Devin Booker won his first ever Player of the Week award for his production from February 8–14, 2021 on February 15 with 32.8 points on 56.3% field goal shooting, 47.6% three-point shooting, and 80.8% free-throw shooting, as well as 5.3 assists and 5.0 rebounds per game in four home games played in that time, winning all four of their games in the process there. He also became the first Suns player to win such an award since Goran Dragić on the week of January 27–February 2, 2014.
- Chris Paul was later named as a nominee for Player of the Week in the Western Conference for his production from February 15–21, 2021, with that award being given to Damian Lillard that week.
- Devin Booker won his second Player of the Week award in three weeks, this time getting only a 3–1 record for the week of February 22–28, 2021, but averaging 33.0 points (including a season-high 43 points on February 28) on 53.8% field goal shooting and 4.3 assists in 32.3 minutes of action per game that week. Booker not only was the first Suns player since Amar'e Stoudemire in the 2007–08 season (their last season they started a season with a 22–11 quality record) to earn the honor in multiple weeks of a season, but also was the first player to win the honor twice in a quick enough manner since Steve Nash in January 2007.
  - A day after getting that Player of the Week Award, on March 2, Devin Booker won his first ever Player of the Month award for his work throughout the month of February, helping lead the Suns to a 12–3 record that month, their highest total wins ever in that month, and the most games they had won in a month since March 2010. As the 14th Suns player to ever win that award, as well as the first since Amar'e Stoudemire back in that same March 2010 period, Booker led the entire Western Conference with 27.9 points on 52.3% field goal shooting, 39.3% three-point shooting, and 85.2% free-throw shooting, 4.5 assists, and 3.7 rebounds per game.
- Monty Williams was also nominated for Coach of the Month for February, though that award went to Quin Snyder for the second time this season due to the Suns' extra loss that month.
- After only being nominated for the Coach of the Month for February, head coach Monty Williams won his second ever Coach of the Month award (first winning that honor over a decade ago in January 2011 with the New Orleans Hornets back when Chris Paul was there) and his first ever with the Suns for the month of March on April 1, edging out the honor over Michael Malone, who coached his Denver Nuggets squad to a similar 11–3 record that month. While their records that month were similar, what separated them in the end was not only Williams' four-game winning streak ending March for the Suns, but also their better overall record, with Phoenix in the Top 10 for both offense and defense by that point for the first time since their 1997–98 season. Not only was Williams named the first Suns head coach to be named Coach of the Month since former Suns player Jeff Hornacek won it in December 2013, but he also joined Alvin Gentry (twice), Mike D'Antoni (four different times), former Suns player Frank Johnson, Phoenix Suns Ring of Honor member and Hall of Famer (as a former player) Paul Westphal, and fellow Phoenix Suns Ring of Honor member Cotton Fitzsimmons (three different times) as the only other Suns coaches to win the honor since it was first introduced.

=== All-Star ===
- Chris Paul – 11th All-Star Game
- Devin Booker – 2nd All-Star Game replacement for Anthony Davis

=== Records ===
- On February 19 & 20, 2021, the Suns became the first team to have consecutive games of at least 35 assists with over 20 three-point shots made their in road wins over the New Orleans Pelicans and Memphis Grizzlies from that time (38 assists over 22 3's from New Orleans, 35 assists over 24 3's from Memphis).
- In the 2021 NBA All-Star Game on March 7, Chris Paul broke Magic Johnson's All-Star record for career assists in All-Star games, getting 16 assists that night for 128 total assists in the All-Star games Paul's played in.
- On March 21, Chris Paul became the third player in NBA history to reach 10,000 assists and 2,000 steals in their careers, joining only John Stockton and former Suns player Jason Kidd in the Suns' 111–94 win over the defending champion Los Angeles Lakers.
- On April 2, Dario Šarić became the third-fastest player to reach 2,000 rebounds and 500 three-pointers in his career at 336 games, only being slower than both Paul George at 326 games and Paul Pierce at 310 games in the Suns' 140–103 win over the Oklahoma City Thunder.
- Ten days later, the Suns not only broke a franchise record for most three-pointers in a quarter with 12 in the second quarter, but they also tied an overall record for most three-pointers made in a half with 18 total against the Houston Rockets.
- After surpassing Maurice Cheeks to reach the Top 5 in all-time steals on April 13, Chris Paul surpassed Magic Johnson to reach the Top 5 in all-time assists less than a week later on April 19. As such, Paul joined John Stockton and former Suns player Jason Kidd as the only players to reach the Top 5 in both milestones throughout their entire NBA careers.

=== Team records ===
- With 38 assists in his first four games with the Suns on December 23–29, 2020, Chris Paul broke Stephon Marbury's record for the most assists held in their first four games with the franchise.
- The 48 three-point attempts the Suns had on December 29, 2020, in their 111–86 win against the New Orleans Pelicans was the highest amount of three-point attempts in a game for the franchise's history.
- With only 3 turnovers given up by the Suns' players to the Indiana Pacers on January 9 (one from Chris Paul, one from Cameron Johnson, and one overall for the team by a shot clock violation in the third quarter), Phoenix tied a team record for fewest turnovers in a single game with their 125–117 win in Indiana.
  - The Suns later tied that record once again on April 10 with 3 turnovers in their 134–106 win over the Washington Wizards at home.
- From January 18 to February 1, 2021, Deandre Ayton had a modern-day franchise record-high eight straight games with at least 13 rebounds grabbed in each game played.
- Their 41–12 fourth quarter finish on February 19, 2021, to win 132–114 against the New Orleans Pelicans tied a franchise record for the biggest point differential for any quarter at the time, as well as became their best fourth quarter in franchise history.
- The 22 three-pointers the Suns had on February 19 against the Pelicans also tied a franchise record for most three-point shots made in a regular season game, which was first set on November 14, 2010 in a win against the Los Angeles Lakers.
  - The Suns then broke that record a day later with 24 three-pointers made in a 128–97 win over the Memphis Grizzlies. The Suns' games from February 19 & 20, 2021 against New Orleans and Memphis were also the first time in franchise history the Suns had back-to-back games with 20+ three-point shots made in a row.
- With a 65–34 lead at halftime on February 20 against the Memphis Grizzlies, this became their best lead by halftime on the road in franchise history.
- On March 21, Chris Paul became the oldest player in franchise history to get a triple-double at 35 years old with 13 assists, 11 points, and 10 rebounds in a 111–94 win against the (admittedly shorthanded) Los Angeles Lakers. He is also 535 points away from being the first NBA player to put up 20,000 points and 10,000 assists in the NBA as of that date.
- The 43–13 first quarter the Suns had on April 2 against the Oklahoma City Thunder is now not only the highest lead total the Suns ever recorded in the first quarter of a game, but also the largest positive point differential for a quarter in franchise history; the game eventually ended with a 140–103 win over the Thunder.
- With 12 three-pointers made in the second quarter of their April 12 game against the Houston Rockets, they not only set a record for most three-pointers made in a quarter, but they also tied a record set earlier in the first half of the season by the Utah Jazz for most three-pointers made in a half with 18 total.
  - The Suns later broke the record for most three-pointers made in a game that night after twice setting it earlier this season with 25 total three-pointers in their final win over the Houston Rockets for this season (this time being at home).

=== Milestones ===
- Chris Paul reached 19,004 career points in the NBA with 13 points scored in a 109–103 win over one of Paul's old teams, the Houston Rockets, on January 20, 2021. He is now the 60th player in league history to reach the 19,000 points barrier for the NBA. He also tied Dale Ellis' position for the All-Time Leading Scorers list that night.
  - The next game he played, he not only surpassed Ellis, but also tied Reggie Theus on the list with 11 points against the Denver Nuggets. The next night after that, he surpassed Theus on the list properly with 21 points against Denver, though both games ended in losses to the Nuggets in overtime thrillers.
- On February 7, 2021, Chris Paul scored 15 points to overtake former Suns player and Hall of Famer Gail Goodrich as the 57th best scorer in league history in a 100–91 win over the Boston Celtics.
  - In the next game Paul was eligible to play in, on February 10, he scored 28 points to overtake former Suns player and current, longtime Suns broadcaster Eddie Johnson as the 56th best scorer in league history during a thrilling 125–124 win over the Milwaukee Bucks.
- On February 16, Chris Paul overtook Hall of Fame center Bob Lanier with an early basket and a foul three-point play at 10:01 in the first quarter to become the 55th best scorer in NBA history against the Brooklyn Nets. He eventually ended the night with 29 points in an unfortunate 128–124 loss there.
- On February 20, Chris Paul overtook Hall of Fame legend Oscar Robertson on the NBA's career assist leaders list with 6 assists (3rd done in the second quarter) in their 128–97 win against the Memphis Grizzlies. This came a day after he put up a season-high 19 assists in a 132–114 win with a surprise in the fourth quarter over the New Orleans Pelicans. Two days after surpassing Oscar Robertson, Chris Paul cracked the 9,900 assists barrier with 9 total in a 132–100 win at home against the Portland Trail Blazers.
- On March 18, Chris Paul overtook one-time former Suns player Jamal Crawford, first by tying him with an early two-point basket with 9:14 in the first quarter and then by overtaking Crawford with in the second quarter with a long, mid-range jump shot with 11:04 in the second quarter to become the 54th best scorer in NBA history against the Minnesota Timberwolves. Paul eventually ended the night with 17 points in an upset loss that night.
- Three days later, on March 21, Chris Paul not only became the sixth player to crack 10,000 assists in the NBA with an alley-oop slam dunk pass to Deandre Ayton with 7:09 left in the third quarter, but he also overtook Terry Cummings to become the 53rd best scorer in NBA history with two free-throws made over a minute later with 6:03 left there in their only regular season home game against the Los Angeles Lakers. Paul later ended the night with a triple-double of 13 assists, 11 points, and 10 rebounds in a 111–94 win against the Lakers.
- In his next game on March 23, Chris Paul tied future Hall of Fame point guard Tony Parker with only 8 points scored (along with 9 assists) in a 110–100 win over the Miami Heat as the 52nd best scorer in NBA history.
  - The next night, Paul (briefly) became the sole possessor of that spot in their match against the Orlando Magic with a mid-range two-pointer at 9:51 early in the first quarter. Paul ended up with 23 points in a close 112–111 upset loss to the Magic.
- Four days after that night in Orlando, Chris Paul overtook Phoenix Suns Ring of Honor legend Walter Davis by scoring 7 points before halftime to become the 51st best scorer in NBA history. Paul ended that day with 16 points, including some clutch free-throws scored late in overtime, for a 101–97 win against the Charlotte Hornets. That game also became their first overtime win of the season after going 0–3 earlier on in 2021.
- On April 5, 2021, Chris Paul surpassed former Suns player Clifford Robinson to reach the Top 50 in the list of National Basketball Association career scoring leaders by first tying him with 12 points scored with 8:17 in the third quarter and then surpassing him with free-throws made with 9:55 left in the fourth quarter on the road against one of his former teams, the Houston Rockets. He also ended the night with a double-double of 19 points and 11 assists alongside 4 steals in a tense 133–130 win over the Rockets. That not only made Paul the seventh player to reach 2,300 career steals, but he also became the fifth player in NBA history to reach 500 games with 10+ assists held in a career, joining Hall of Fame guards John Stockton, Magic Johnson, and former Suns players Jason Kidd and Steve Nash.
- A week later, on April 12, Chris Paul ended up surpassing both Hall of Fame small forwards Bernard King and Scottie Pippen to not only be the 49th best scorer in the list of National Basketball Association career scoring leaders, but also to become the sixth best ball stealer in the list of National Basketball Association career steals leaders respectively. He did it by first scoring an early three-pointer with 9:27 left in the first quarter to quickly surpass King and then first tying Pippen in steals with 6:50 in the first quarter, followed by surpassing Pippen in all-time steals with a second steal at 9:53 left in the third quarter during the Suns' final match of the season against the Houston Rockets. Paul later ended the night with a near double-double of nine points and ten assists alongside those two steals in their 126–120 home win against the Rockets.
- A day after that, on April 13, Chris Paul surpassed Maurice Cheeks to reach the Top 5 on the list of National Basketball Association career steals leaders. After getting his first steal that night in the middle of the first quarter, he tied Cheeks in steals with a steal by 7:13 left in the fourth quarter, followed by surpassing Cheeks with a late steal coming at 3:22 left in the game. He ended the night with those three steals alongside nine assists and five points in a 106–86 win over the defending Eastern Conference champion Miami Heat at home.
- On April 17, Devin Booker became only the ninth player in NBA history to score over 9,000 points in the league before turning 25 years old by making two free-throws with 4:06 in the second quarter. He joined LeBron James, Kevin Durant, Carmelo Anthony, Kobe Bryant, Tracy McGrady, Giannis Antetokounmpo, Shaquille O'Neal, and Anthony Davis as the only other players to achieve this feat. However, Booker only scored 15 points that night in a loss to the rivaling San Antonio Spurs. He also became the fifth-youngest player in NBA history to reach over 9,000 points in NBA history, behind LeBron James, Kevin Durant, Carmelo Anthony, and the late, great Kobe Bryant.
- In their next game two days later, Chris Paul surpassed legendary Hall of Fame Los Angeles Lakers point guard Magic Johnson to reach the Top 5 in the list of National Basketball Association career assists leaders by reaching his 10th assist of the night with a breakaway pass for a Devin Booker slam dunk with 4:05 left in the fourth quarter in a tightly contested match against the Milwaukee Bucks. He ended the night with 22 points, 13 assists, and 7 rebounds in a close 128–127 overtime win over the Bucks on the road.
- In the game after that, on April 21, Chris Paul surpassed Hall of Fame Utah Jazz point guard legend John Stockton to become 48th in the list of National Basketball Association career scoring leaders, first tying and then surpassing Stockton early in the first quarter. Paul ended the game with a team-high 28 points and 8 assists in a close 116–113 win over the Philadelphia 76ers in the second game of their five-game road trip in April.

=== Team milestones ===
- With their November 16, 2020 trade for Chris Paul, this marked their fourth trade for an All-Star player after a prior season concluded, coming behind Truck Robinson in 1979, Dennis Johnson in 1980, and Charles Barkley in 1992. Paul was later named an All-Star for this season with the Suns, leading them to a 20–10 record at the time of the official All-Star roster announcements.
- On December 27, 2020, Devin Booker overtook both former teammate Leandro Barbosa and then Shawn Marion with six three-point shot attempts to now be in the Top 3 for three-point shot attempts in franchise history during their revenge road win over the Sacramento Kings. He also became the 12th player in franchise history to reach 2,000 free-throw attempts with only four attempts (three made) that night.
- The Phoenix Suns began with a 3–1 start to a season for the first time since 2014.
  - Similarly, by beating the Utah Jazz 106–95 on December 31, 2020, and the Denver Nuggets 106–103 on January 1, 2021, the Suns began with a 5–1 start to their season (as well as to end 2020 and enter 2021) for the first time since the 2009–10 season.
- With 25 points scored in a close 112–107 loss to the Los Angeles Clippers on January 3, 2021, Devin Booker surpassed Phoenix Suns Ring of Honor member Tom Chambers to become the 11th best scorer in franchise history. He also became the 12th Suns player in franchise history to reach 6,000 field goal attempts that night.
- Their 7–3 start to this season is their best 10-game start to a season since the 2009–10 season.
- Starting from January 18, 2021 and continuing until at least January 28, Deandre Ayton joined Charles Barkley and his former rookie season teammate Tyson Chandler as the only Suns players in the last 30 seasons to have at least 13 rebounds in six straight games. With 17 rebounds against the Dallas Mavericks on both January 30 and February 1, he later became the only Suns player in the last 30 seasons to achieve such results in eight straight games for a season.
- On January 20, Deandre Ayton became the first Suns player to get at least 25 points, 15 rebounds, and 5 blocks in a game since Shawn Marion on December 12, 2007 against the Utah Jazz. Ayton recorded 26 points, 17 rebounds, 5 blocks, and 3 assists in a 109–103 win over the Houston Rockets that night.
- Also on January 20, Devin Booker overtook Larry Nance Sr. in shot attempts with 18 attempts to be 11th in attempted shots for the Suns that day.
- Chris Paul's 14 assists in the first half on January 22 against the Denver Nuggets was the most assists a Suns player has had in a half since Steve Nash in 2007. He'd only get one more assist that night before losing that game in overtime.
- Also on January 22, Devin Booker became the 11th player in franchise history to score 8,000 points with the Suns in his career, scoring 31 that game to reach 8,003 overall points that night, only leaving overtime early due to a strained left hamstring. He also overtook Steve Nash with 6/6 free-throws made that game to become the franchise's ninth-best free-throw scorer.
- On February 1, 2021, Devin Booker became the fourth Suns player (behind Steve Nash, Dan Majerle, and one-time former teammate Leandro Barbosa) to score 700 three-pointers with them, scoring four of them that night, including a clutch three-pointer with 1.5 seconds left near the end of their road rematch against the Dallas Mavericks to win 109–108 that night.
- Two days after returning to action, Devin Booker surpassed Phoenix Suns Ring of Honor member Dan Majerle in points scored with the Suns as the new tenth best scorer in franchise history on February 3. He scored his 2-point basket to overtake Thunder Dan with 2:49 left in the second quarter, eventually ending with 25 points in a 111–86 loss to the New Orleans Pelicans.
- On February 8, Devin Booker became the third Suns player in franchise history (behind Phoenix Suns Ring of Honor members Dan Majerle and Steve Nash) to reach 2,000 three-point shot attempts with the franchise, having 9 attempts that night in a 119–113 win over the Cleveland Cavaliers.
- Two days later, on February 10, Devin Booker overtook Phoenix Suns Ring of Honor member Tom Chambers in the Top 10 for field goal attempts with the Suns, putting up 21 attempts in a close 125–124 win over the Milwaukee Bucks that night. He also surpassed Shawn Marion to be 11th in free-throw attempts with 9 had (making the 7 necessary for the win) that night.
- Excluding their 2020 NBA Bubble period, the Suns' 4-game winning streak (at home) on February 5–10, 2021 was their first 4-game winning streak since March 15–22, 2015.
  - With their 120–111 win on February 13 against the Philadelphia 76ers and a 109–90 win against a severely undermanned Orlando Magic a day later on Valentine's Day, excluding their run in the 2020 Bubble, this became their first 6-game winning streak since December 17–28, 2014. The Suns later matched that winning streak this season with wins from March 26-April 5, 2021.
- On February 14, Devin Booker tied Hall of Famer and Phoenix Suns Ring of Honor member Connie Hawkins for the most free-throws made in franchise history with 6 free-throws made (out of 7 total) that night in their 109–90 win over the Orlando Magic. Booker also overtook Hall of Famer and Phoenix Suns Ring of Honor member Charles Barkley in the Top 10 for free-throw attempts held with the team, getting 7 attempts (and making only 6 of them) that night.
  - A day later, he later became the sole holder of the eighth-best free-throw scorer in franchise history mark for a good while with 4 free-throws made in an upset 128–124 loss to the Brooklyn Nets to end their 7-game homestand.
- Chris Paul's 19 assists he had on February 19, 2021, in a 132–114 upset win against the New Orleans Pelicans was the highest amount of assists a Suns player had in a game since Goran Dragić's 18 from February 19, 2013 (and before that, since Steve Nash's 19 on December 15, 2010 (or 20 on March 22, 2011)).
- The 30+ point wins on February 20 against the Memphis Grizzlies and February 22 against the Portland Trail Blazers was the first time the Suns have had consecutive 30+ point wins in a season since April 15 & 17, 1989. It also became the third time in the franchise's history that the Suns blew out consecutive opponents by 30 or more points in a season, with the first time being on December 4 & 5, 1971 against the Golden State Warriors.
- Also on February 22, Devin Booker became the first Suns player to score over 30 points on 70% field goal shooting, 100% three-point shooting, and 100% free-throw shooting since Phoenix Suns Ring of Honor member Kevin Johnson did it on November 9, 1993 against the Los Angeles Clippers.
- Two days later, on February 24, Devin Booker overtook Phoenix Suns Ring of Honor member Tom Chambers as the 11th best field goal scorer in franchise history with 13 shots made in a close 124–121 loss at home against the Charlotte Hornets.
- The Suns started out their first 30 games in a season with a 20–10 record for the first time since the 2007–08 season.
  - Later entering the All-Star Weekend, they led the Pacific Division and were at least second in their conference by that time for the first time since the 2006–07 season.
- On March 2, 2021, Devin Booker surpassed former power forward Larry Nance Sr. as the newest, ninth best scorer in franchise history with 17 points scored before being controversially ejected with 7:10 left in the third quarter under a 114–104 win over the defending champion Los Angeles Lakers.
- Devin Booker later reached his 100th 30+ point game of his career with a 35-point performance in a 127–121 win against the Portland Trail Blazers on March 11.
- On March 13, Devin Booker tied Phoenix Suns Ring of Honor member Dan Majerle in the Top 10 for most baskets made with the Suns, scoring nine that night to match 2,947 baskets made for Phoenix during their 122–111 loss to the Indiana Pacers.
  - Two days later, Booker became the sole holder of the 10th best field goal scorer in franchise history with 10 made in a 122–99 win over the Memphis Grizzlies.
- On March 24, Devin Booker became the 10th player in franchise history to reach 3,000 baskets made with the Suns, scoring 9 total in a 112–111 upset loss to the Orlando Magic.
- Two days later, on March 26, Devin Booker surpassed Larry Nance Sr. as the ninth-best attempted free-throw shooter in franchise history by getting two crucial free-throws made with 2.2 seconds remaining in their 104–100 win over the Toronto Raptors at the Amalie Arena in Tampa Bay, Florida.
- Their March 26 win against the Toronto Raptors in Tampa Bay also was the first time they reached 30 wins in a season without something like the 2020 NBA Bubble being involved since their 2014–15 season, with that also being their last season where they reached that mark with a winning record, with or without that NBA Bubble. That win also began a seven-game winning streak for the Suns this season, their first outside of the 2020 NBA Bubble since the 2009–10 season.
- Two days after that, on March 28, Devin Booker surpassed former teammate Leandro Barbosa for the 3rd most three-point shots made in franchise history with four three-pointers made in a 101–97 overtime win over the Charlotte Hornets at the end of their four-game road trip that also started with the Miami Heat. He also overtook Phoenix Suns Ring of Honor member Dan Majerle in the Top 10 for field goal attempts with the Suns with 26 that day, reaching 6,665 total shot attempts and counting afterward.
- With their overtime win against Charlotte on March 28, the Suns also had a record where they were 17 games over .500 for the first time since March 19, 2010. It was since later expanded to 22 games over .500 with close home wins over the Atlanta Hawks and Chicago Bulls to end the month of March and wild wins over the Oklahoma City Thunder, Houston Rockets, and Utah Jazz (in overtime) to start out April. Soon afterward, they went over the 24 games over .500 barrier that season's Suns team had with home wins over the Washington Wizards, Houston Rockets, Miami Heat, and Sacramento Kings after losing on the road to the Los Angeles Clippers.
- On April 5, Devin Booker surpassed Phoenix Suns Ring of Honor member Tom Chambers as the seventh-best free-throw shooter in franchise history with 8 key free-throws made (out of 9 total) in a tense 133–130 win against the Houston Rockets.
- With a 117–113 overtime win at home over the top ranked Utah Jazz on April 7, excluding the 2020 NBA Bubble period, the Suns got their first 7-game winning streak since when they had a 10-game winning streak from March 14-April 2, 2010.
- A day later, on April 8, Devin Booker surpassed Phoenix Suns Ring of Honor member Paul Westphal as the newest sixth-best free-throw shooter in franchise history with 12 free-throws (out of 14 total) made in a 113–103 road loss to the Los Angeles Clippers.
- With the Suns' 134–106 win over the Washington Wizards at home two days later, they officially had their first winning season since their 2013–14 season. On that night, Devin Booker also overtook Phoenix Suns Ring of Honor member Dan Majerle to reach the Top 10 in assists for the franchise's history with 6 total assists that game, reaching 1,827 overall assists from that point in time.
- With a 122–114 win over the Sacramento Kings at home on April 15, the Suns officially got their first winning season of 40+ games since their 2013–14 season. It also gave the Suns their first 10-game winning streak at home for the first time since their home games played during the period of October 30-December 19, 2009 over a decade ago after starting out with a payback win over the Minnesota Timberwolves on March 19 which also saw coach Monty Williams getting ejected that night in March. Furthermore, with a 40–15 record, it also gave Phoenix their best start for a season after 55 games played since the 2006–07 season.
- In their next game, on April 17, Devin Booker became the ninth Suns player in franchise history to score over 9,000 points with the team, hitting that mark with two free-throws made with 4:06 in the second quarter that night against the San Antonio Spurs. However, he ended the night with only 15 points in a loss to the Spurs that time.
- Two days later, on April 19, the Suns got their first season of 41+ wins (which signifies an average record, at worst, for a normal NBA season) since their 2013–14 season. This time, the Suns got their 41st win in a tense 128–127 overtime win over the Milwaukee Bucks on the road, which also saw Devin Booker make only half of his free-throws near the end of the game to win by one on purpose this time around as opposed to winning that way unintentionally against the Bucks earlier in this season at home.
- Two days after that, on April 21, the Suns guaranteed themselves their first season of 42 or more wins in a season (indicating an above-average record in a regular 82-game NBA season) since the 2013–14 season. Like their previous game, their 116–113 win over the Philadelphia 76ers on the road also ended with the Suns making only half of their free-throws with less than a second left in the game, though this time it was Chris Paul shooting and it ended with a near buzzer-beating heave by Joel Embiid from close to full-court range. Also on that day, Devin Booker overtook Phoenix Suns Ring of Honor member Dan Majerle in three-point shot attempts in franchise history with three failed three-point attempts that game, now being behind only Phoenix Suns Ring of Honor Hall of Fame point guard Steve Nash there with his 2,417 three-point shot attempts.
- In their next game only a day later, Devin Booker tied Phoenix Suns Ring of Honor member Connie Hawkins for free-throw attempts with only 4 total free-throw attempts in their 99–86 road loss to the Boston Celtics.
  - Three days later, Devin Booker not only surpassed Connie Hawkins with a defensive three-second lane violation technical free-throw late in the first quarter, but also surpassed fellow Phoenix Suns Ring of Honor member Tom Chambers with two free-throws late in the first quarter to become 7th in free-throw attempts with the franchise by getting 9 total attempts in their rematch against the Brooklyn Nets. He also became the sixth player in franchise history to reach 2,000 free-throws made with them, scoring 8 out of 9 total in a 128–119 loss to the Nets.
- On April 26, in Phoenix's last game of their five-game road trip for April, Devin Booker officially surpassed Jay Humphries to be ninth in assists throughout the franchise's history with 3 total assists against the New York Knicks. Booker first tied Humphries with an assist to Mikal Bridges at 4:40 in the third quarter to catch up against New York and then overtook him with an assist to Jevon Carter for 3 with 9:40 in the fourth quarter to begin a 10-2 scoring run to help the Suns get a 118–110 win over the Knicks to end that road trip with a winning record.
- On April 28, 2021, the Suns officially broke their decade-long playoff drought, ending it by officially entering the 2021 NBA playoffs with a 109–101 win at home over the Los Angeles Clippers. Also on that night, Devin Booker became the ninth player in franchise history to have over 7,000 field goal attempts with the team, having 19 attempts (with 9 shots made) for 21 points that night.

== Player statistics ==
Legend
GP	Games played	GS	Games started	MPG	Minutes per game
FG%	Field-goal percentage	3P%	3-point field-goal percentage	FT%	Free-throw percentage
RPG	Rebounds per game	APG	Assists per game	SPG	Steals per game
BPG	Blocks per game	PPG	Points per game

=== Regular season ===
Phoenix Suns statistics
Player	GP	GS	MPG	FG%	3P%	FT%	RPG	APG	SPG	BPG	PPG
Mikal Bridges	72	72	32.6	.543	.425	.840	4.3	2.1	1.1	.9	13.5
Chris Paul	70	70	31.4	.499	.395	.934	4.5	8.9	1.4	.3	16.4
Deandre Ayton	69	69	30.7	.626	.200	.769	10.5	1.4	.6	1.2	14.4
Devin Booker	67	67	33.9	.484	.340	.867	4.2	4.3	.8	.2	25.6
Jae Crowder	60	42	27.5	.404	.389	.760	4.7	2.1	.8	.5	10.1
Cameron Johnson	60	11	24.0	.420	.349	.847	3.3	1.4	.6	.3	9.6
Cameron Payne	60	1	18.0	.484	.440	.893	2.4	3.6	.6	.3	8.4
Jevon Carter	60	1	12.0	.422	.371	.571	1.5	1.2	.5	.2	4.1
Dario Šarić	50	4	17.4	.447	.348	.848	3.8	1.3	.6	.1	8.7
Frank Kaminsky	47	13	15.2	.471	.365	.617	4.0	1.7	.3	.4	6.6
Langston Galloway	40	0	11.0	.449	.424	.957	1.1	.7	.2	.0	4.8
Torrey Craig^{†}	32	8	18.8	.503	.369	.800	4.8	1.0	.6	.6	7.2
E'Twaun Moore	27	1	14.4	.455	.314	.857	1.7	1.5	.6	.2	4.9
Jalen Smith	27	1	5.8	.440	.235	.714	1.4	.1	.0	.2	2.0
Abdel Nader	24	0	14.8	.491	.419	.757	2.6	.8	.4	.4	6.7
Ty-Shon Alexander	15	0	3.1	.250	.222	.500	.7	.4	.0	.1	.6
Damian Jones^{†}	14	0	6.7	.500	.000	.545	1.3	.3	.1	.4	1.6

=== Playoffs ===
Phoenix Suns statistics
Player	GP	GS	MPG	FG%	3P%	FT%	RPG	APG	SPG	BPG	PPG
Devin Booker	22	22	40.4	.447	.321	.905	5.6	4.5	.8	.2	27.3
Deandre Ayton	22	22	36.4	.658		.736	11.8	1.1	.8	1.1	15.8
Jae Crowder	22	22	33.1	.413	.380	.886	6.1	1.9	.9	.8	10.8
Mikal Bridges	22	22	32.1	.484	.368	.893	4.3	1.6	1.0	.7	11.1
Cameron Payne	22	2	19.0	.425	.362	.889	2.5	3.2	.8	.5	9.3
Torrey Craig	22	0	12.1	.427	.405	.615	2.9	.4	.0	.4	4.0
Cameron Johnson	21	0	21.1	.500	.446	.906	3.1	.8	.9	.2	8.2
Chris Paul	20	20	34.2	.497	.446	.877	3.5	8.6	1.2	.2	19.2
Dario Šarić	14	0	10.5	.467	.444	.929	2.5	1.0	.1	.1	4.5
Frank Kaminsky	10	0	6.8	.455	.200	1.000	1.4	1.4	.2	.3	2.2
E'Twaun Moore	7	0	6.6	.444	.200		1.4	1.3	.1	.0	2.4
Jevon Carter	7	0	3.1	.375	.000	.000	.3	.6	.0	.0	.9
Jalen Smith	6	0	3.0	.500	1.000		.8	.2	.0	.0	.8
Abdel Nader	5	0	5.8	.333	.000		1.0	.0	.0	.0	.8
Langston Galloway	2	0	7.5	.143	.000	.000	1.0	.5	.0	.5	1.0
Ty-Shon Alexander	1	0	1.0	1.000			.0	.0	.0	.0	2.0

- ^{†} Denotes player spent time with another team in the season. Stats reflect time with the Suns only.

== Transactions ==
=== Trades ===
November 16, 2020	To Phoenix Suns (United States) Chris Paul (Egypt) Abdel Nader	To Oklahoma City Thunder (Spain) Ricky Rubio (United States) Kelly Oubre Jr. (United States) Jalen Lecque (United States) Ty Jerome; 2022 Top-12 protected first-round pick
March 18, 2021	To Phoenix Suns (United States) Torrey Craig	To Milwaukee Bucks Cash Considerations

=== Free agents ===
==== Re-Signed ====
Player	Signed	Date	Prior team
Jevon Carter	Signed 3-year deal worth $11.5 Million	November 23, 2020	Phoenix Suns
Dario Šarić	Signed 3-year deal worth $27 Million	November 28, 2020	Phoenix Suns
Frank Kaminsky III	Re-signed 1-year deal worth $1,737,145	December 22, 2020	Sacramento Kings

==== Additions ====
Player	Signed	Former team(s)
Ty-Shon Alexander	Signed 2-year two-way contract worth $449,155	Creighton Bluejays
Jae Crowder	Signed 3-year deal worth $30 Million	Miami Heat
Damian Jones	Signed 2-year partially guaranteed deal worth $3,714,156	Atlanta Hawks
E'Twaun Moore	Signed 1-year deal worth $2,331,593	New Orleans Pelicans
Langston Galloway	Signed 1-year deal worth $2,174,318	Detroit Pistons

==== Subtractions ====
Player	Reason left	New team(s)
Ricky Rubio	Traded	Oklahoma City Thunder / Minnesota Timberwolves
Kelly Oubre Jr.	Traded	Oklahoma City Thunder / Golden State Warriors
Jalen Lecque	Traded	Oklahoma City Thunder / Indiana Pacers / Fort Wayne Mad Ants
Ty Jerome	Traded	Oklahoma City Thunder / Oklahoma City Blue
Tariq Owens	Two-way contract expired	Long Island Nets
Frank Kaminsky III	Waived / Unrestricted free agent	Sacramento Kings / Phoenix Suns
Cheick Diallo	Waived / Unrestricted free agent	(Russia) Avtodor Saratov / (Spain) Baloncesto Fuenlabrada
Aron Baynes	Unrestricted free agent	(Canada) Toronto Raptors
Élie Okobo	Waived / Unrestricted free agent	Brooklyn Nets / Long Island Nets / (France) ASVEL Basket
Damian Jones	Waived	Los Angeles Lakers / Sacramento Kings
