= Al McCoy (sportscaster) =

American sports announcer (1933–2024)

- Born: Allen Leonard McCoy; April 26, 1933; Williams, Iowa, U.S.
- Died: September 21, 2024 (aged 91)
- Other name: The Voice of the Suns
- Education: Drake University; University of Iowa
- Occupation: Sportscaster
- Years active: 1950–2023
- Spouse: Koharig Shahanian (m. 1958; died 2012)
- Children: 3
- Sports commentary career
- Teams: Phoenix Giants (1958–59, 1966–69); Arizona State Sun Devils (1960–1966); Phoenix Roadrunners (1967–1972); Phoenix Suns (1972–2023); Arizona Diamondbacks (1998–2001)
- Genre: Play-by-play
- Sports: Basketball; baseball; ice hockey; football; boxing; pro wrestling

Allen Leonard McCoy (April 26, 1933 – September 21, 2024) was an American sportscaster who was the play-by-play announcer for the Phoenix Suns of the National Basketball Association from 1972 to 2023. The 2022–23 NBA season was his 51st and final season. He is the longest-tenured broadcaster in NBA history.

Along with Chick Hearn, Hot Rod Hundley and Kevin Calabro, he was among the last of NBA broadcasters to have been simulcast on both television and radio, before league-officials ended the practice in the mid-2000's and McCoy's broadcasts became exclusive to radio and online streaming via the Suns Radio Network.

His fast-paced, classical broadcasting style coupled with his colorful use of catchphrase to distinguish plays has proven influential to a generation of sportscasters, such as lead NBA on ABC play-by-play announcer Mike Breen, who remarked of McCoy as "one of my heroes" during live ESPN coverage of the 2021 Western Conference Finals. Steve Albert said "I put him up there with Vin Scully and Ernie Harwell, and all the greats, all the legends."

McCoy is a Curt Gowdy Media Award winner and a member of the Phoenix Suns Ring of Honor. Despite these accolades, The Arizona Republic would later detail the circumstances leading to his forced displacement to the back of the Suns arena upon his final season, after 50 previous seasons on the floor next to the Suns players' bench in a courtside spot once-named "the best seat in the house" in his own Ring of Honor speech. The Arizona Republic also published a photo gallery showing 90-year-old Al McCoy walking up the long flights of concrete steps to the higher arena location Suns personnel moved him to finish his career.

== Early life ==
McCoy was born on April 26, 1933, Williams, Iowa. He grew up on a farm outside the area with no electricity or running water throughout his early childhood. To entertain himself as a boy on the farm, he would often read comic books or listen to his family's battery-powered radio.

At an early age, he became interested in both the local and nationally-syndicated sportscasts picked up through the area's AM radio frequencies. The sounds of broadcasters like Bert Wilson, Don Dunphy, Bill Stern, along with Pat Flanagan, Jack Brickhouse and Harry Caray, would inspire his interest in sports and broadcasting. As a boy, he would sometimes prop himself on the farm's fence posts and broadcast fantasy play-by-play for a crowd of the family's pigs and cattle, imagining himself at Chicago Stadium, Madison Square Garden or Boston Garden.

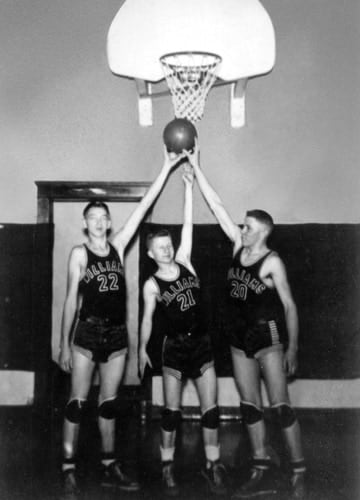
Al McCoy (center) played starting point guard for the Williams High School basketball team.

In 1945, he attended the World Series between the Chicago Cubs and Detroit Tigers. In the fall of 1948, he attended his first National Basketball Association (then-known as the National Basketball League) game as the Waterloo Hawks hosted league-MVP Don Otten's Tri-Cities Black Hawks, and would soon witness George Mikan play in-person during another game in Waterloo. He continued to scan the radio dial every night to hear the Joe Louis big boxing fights of the era, Cubs broadcasts, national football, basketball, or any and every other sport he could get tuned through his receiver. Concurrently, as an active youth with a basketball hoop now-propped up in a tree on the farm, he made the starting line-up of his high-school basketball team for three seasons, playing the position of point-guard. His high school Coach Chuck Lovin remembered McCoy as a "good shot" who was "intense" about everything he did in high school, from athletics to school plays.

Around the same span of time, at the age of 14, he began playing jazz piano in a variety of local and touring small-piece and big bands at local area dances in the midwest-territory for extra income, a side-gig he would continue throughout college that would routinely have him home by 2.a.m. for 7 a.m. classes. One memorable night, he played as a sideman to famed jazz trumpeter Roy Eldridge, who remembered and recognized him immediately upon their second meeting many years later, as McCoy attended a concert alongside Al Bianchi & John MacLeod following a Phoenix Suns game.

=== Education and early career ===
He attended Drake University, majoring in Drama-Speech and minoring in Broadcast Journalism.

Drake University did not formally offer a radio or broadcast major at the time, so McCoy signed up for as many radio classes as he could. During his first year of classes he begged his professor, the head of the radio department and Drake Relays announcer Jim Duncan to let him borrow a university tape recorder so he could demo his play-by-play during a campus basketball game. Assuring McCoy it could wait until his junior or senior year, Professor Duncan relented after weeks of McCoy's ongoing persistence. Dropping his recording off early the next morning and eager for his professor's critique, he waited another couple weeks until finally being called into Duncan's office, who now demanded to know how long McCoy had been calling basketball games. Impressed by the level of detail in his first play-by-play recording, Duncan became McCoy's early supporter and mentor from that date forward.

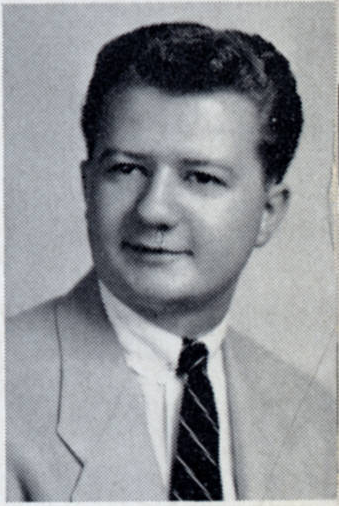
Al McCoy graduated from Drake University in 1954.

Also during his freshman year his first job in radio was at KJFJ in Webster City, Iowa, and he was soon hired by WHO in Des Moines, Iowa, working the night shift where was subsequently told by the person who hired him that he did not have a future in broadcasting, demoted from "on-air" talent and moved to production staff.

Shaken by the experience, but undeterred from following his childhood dreams, McCoy left WHO for smaller family-run station KWDM to strengthen his play-by-play for a variety of different sports. Amidst transition, he first encountered Chick Hearn, then-broadcaster for Bradley University, at a Bradley-Drake basketball game. The two would remain friends until Hearn's death in 2002, buying each other dinner when either were in Phoenix or Los Angeles for their future respective NBA teams, often reminiscing on their early days broadcasting in the midwest. McCoy would later credit Hearn along with Marty Glickman as “blazing the trial” for basketball broadcasters in his Naismith Hall of Fame speech.

In 1954 McCoy graduated from Drake. Testing his luck out west where some of his relatives had relocated, he spent a summer looking for radio work in Phoenix, Arizona and later Denver, Colorado. In both locations he found could not even land a single job interview and played piano to support himself, before applying for a graduate assistantship at the University of Iowa.

During and following the year of graduate school McCoy ran the gamut of employers, bouncing around more local Iowa stations like KXIC where he kept area connections and as of 2007 was still a frequent guest on "Two Guys Named Jim"—a sports-talk show on WHO. He would eventually move from Iowa City, to WJJD in Chicago, to WHLD in Niagara Falls where he commenced broadcasting a “Steve Allen-type” piano-meets-disc jockey show for Buffalo, New York that was rejected by WHO. Three weeks after moving to Niagara Falls amidst a decade of constant transition and upheaval, he found stability in the form of Georgia Shahinian, born Koharig Shahinian, meeting her at a birthday party for a mutual friend. The two soon found themselves inseparable, and quickly became a daily part of each other's lives.

As his radio contract in Buffalo was set to expire, McCoy got a tip from New York Giants play-by-play broadcaster Russ Hodges that the team would be relocating to San Francisco as their Triple-A farm team moved to Phoenix, Arizona. Both men felt McCoy had a good shot of securing the job. With major life decisions to be made quickly, Georgia & Al McCoy were soon wed, hitching their lives on a trailer attached to his '54 Ford with no air conditioning, headed southwest in the summer of 1958.

=== Early Phoenix career ===
After getting married, Al & Georgia McCoy moved to Phoenix, AZ in the summer of 1958. He was soon hired by KOOL, scheduled broadcaster for the Phoenix Giants, and he worked as the host of night-time radio shows for the station until the team completed their own move to the west coast.

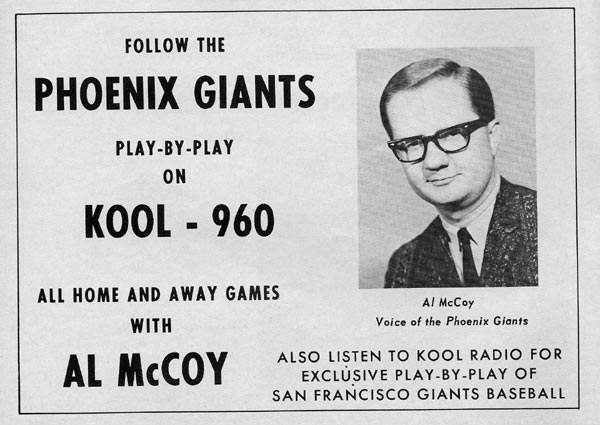
Advertisement for Phoenix Giants games on radio, 1958.

With the Phoenix Giants, McCoy broadcast the only baseball game in history to be postponed due to grasshoppers, who collectively gathered around all the surrounding sources of light and placed the ball park in a shroud of darkness. McCoy described exiting the ball park grounds as “like driving around in snow. There'd be a drift of grasshoppers in the street. you'd start sliding around.”

McCoy was occasionally visited during Phoenix Giants broadcasts by then-San Francisco Giants owner Horace Stoneham, who often told McCoy he would become the next “Voice of the Giants” in Major League Baseball. When the job was eventually offered, talk of a potential move of the team away from the west coast caused McCoy to decline, believing it to not be the “right fit.” During another period in time when the Giants job was again presented, McCoy briefly contemplated broadcasting both Suns and Giants games, planning to make a decision later, but was ultimately glad he did not. He would eventually one day fill-in as play-by-play for the San Francisco Giants for one single game, during a night the Suns were not playing.

The Triple-A team would also eventually leave Phoenix for Tacoma, WA due to a dispute over construction of a new ball park, while McCoy remained in Phoenix. Once the park was built, the team returned. In the interim five years without the Phoenix Giants, McCoy became "One of the Good Guys", a DJ on KRUX 1360 AM. While on KRUX in the 1960s he also did play-by-play for ASU Sun Devil's football and basketball. On local television stations KTVK and KTAR-TV, he did ring announcing work for boxing fights held at Phoenix Madison Square Garden, and also some professional wrestling commentary for the regional territory.

McCoy parted ways with the Phoenix Giants three years after their return to Phoenix in 1966. He would eventually return to baseball some 32-years later with the Arizona Diamondbacks during the club's first season in 1998, paired with Joe Garagiola.

As the Western Hockey League expanded to Arizona in 1967, McCoy also began broadcasting for the Phoenix Roadrunners during the Giants' off-season. Less experienced with hockey, McCoy served as a color-commentator for two seasons before learning to do play-by-play for the ice on-the-fly after his broadcaster partner Jim Wells fell through a shower door. McCoy found he enjoyed doing hockey play-by-play, and Wells' agreed that it would be a better fit if they switched roles after his recovery.

As his ongoing commitments to the Phoenix Giants, the Phoenix Roadrunners and other radio stations transitioned, he began to observe a “buzz” in the city over a potential new NBA expansion team and quickly made inroads to secure a job with the new franchise as it was officially announced in 1968.

== The Voice of the Suns ==
Al McCoy served as the play-by-play "Voice of the Phoenix Suns" for 51 consecutive seasons, or every season excluding the first four years of franchise existence. He became a fixture of Phoenix media and local pop-culture as the central broadcaster for the Phoenix Suns on both radio and television until 2003, when Suns TV and Suns radio became separate media. McCoy continued to broadcast on the Suns Radio Network through the 2022-23 NBA season.

For 50 consecutive seasons (barring remote broadcasts during the pandemic) his official arena broadcast location had been stationed courtside, adjacent to the Suns players' home bench, as recent as May 2022. He stopped broadcasting road games in 2019 due to difficult vantage points at higher locations in other NBA arenas.

On October 2, 2022, his home broadcast location was moved higher up in the Suns arena, just beneath the skyboxes in the Footprint Center.

=== The NBA arrives in Phoenix (1966–1972) ===
In the fall of 1966 McCoy completed his first NBA broadcast during a preseason game at Arizona Veterans Memorial Coliseum between the St. Louis Hawks and Golden State Warriors. Thrilled by the idea of professional basketball in Phoenix upon announcement of the scheduled game, he phoned the Hawks GM and brokered a deal for his then-employer KOOL-FM to broadcast the game in exchange for free advertising spots, making sure to record his broadcast as a demo for a potential future in basketball.

Two years later in 1968, the city of Phoenix was granted an expansion team that would become the Phoenix Suns. Immediately, prior to the start of the first season, McCoy slipped then-General Manager Jerry Colangelo a recording of that 1966 preseason game. Colangelo was blown away by what he heard and wanted McCoy to handle play-by-play for the team on planned broadcasts on local KTAR-AM and KTAR-TV. Tired of moving around from radio gig to radio gig, and seeking stability for his now-family of a wife and three sons, McCoy suggested Colangelo retain broadcast rights instead of selling them to another station, the routine sportscast policy of the time. McCoy suggested producing everything in-house, which was a new concept for the era. Colangelo liked McCoy's pitch, but after inaugural season tickets were underselling, he ultimately decided to sell the rights to KTAR. Believing it was no longer the right move, McCoy declined working out a separate deal with the station.

Following multiple changes in Suns broadcasters over the next four seasons, GM and head coach Jerry Colangelo would eventually agree with McCoy about the Suns organization producing their own broadcasts, realizing he was often competing with the radio and television stations for Suns advertising. With one year left before the broadcast rights reverted to the organization, McCoy agreed to a contract with the Suns as Vice President of Broadcasting.

=== The simulcast era (1972-2003) ===
On September 27, 1972, McCoy broadcast his first game with the Suns, alongside Hot Rod Hundley, during the NBA preseason hosted by ABA team the Utah Stars. Initially, McCoy would handle production of both the radio and TV broadcasts by himself. He would hire a television crew in each city for road games after arriving in the destination city. He handled his own audio engineering and would, on an occasion or two, have to broadcast games via telephone due to technical difficulties. He helped sell advertising and would meet with any potential clients alongside Jerry Colangelo. McCoy observed "maybe 8 people in the entire front office" when he was hired, first-hand witnessing the Suns organization's gradual and eventual growth into a company that now employs hundreds.

The first Triple-Overtime game in NBA Finals history, Game 5 of the 1976 NBA Finals at Boston Garden, was memorable in many ways to McCoy, who broadcast the game directly beside a group of rowdy, inebriated Celtics' fans, one of whom passed out on McCoy's lap amidst the frenzy as "The Shot Heard 'Round the World" by Gar Heard sent the game into league-history. McCoy deftly pushed the fan off his lap and onto the floor mid-sentence as he continued his broadcast unabated.

He was also courtside, live on the air for the second Triple-Overtime game in NBA Finals History during Game 3 of the 1993 NBA Finals between the Charles Barkley-led Phoenix Suns and Michael Jordan's Chicago Bulls.

The NBA's adoption of the Three-point field goal in 1979 would prove as influential to McCoy's career as it would to modern basketball itself. Upon its integration into the league, McCoy viewed the shot as the equivalent of a home-run in baseball. Noting that every baseball announcer has their own "signature call" for home-runs, he questioned what his NBA call could be. Thinking back to his childhood on the farm, his favorite comic book Captain Marvel and the moment mild-mannered Billy Batson transformed into the mighty Captain Marvel by shouting the word "SHAZAM!" to a flurry of thunder and lightning, McCoy believed this phrase - an acronym for the first initials of Solomon, Hercules, Atlas, Zeus, Achilles and Mercury - would convey the proper level of enormity and distinction he felt the shot deserved.

In July 2003, after 31 years of being simulcast on both television and radio, the Suns organization relented to growing NBA pressure to end the simulcast format after then Suns General Manager Bryan Colangelo felt a younger presence would be better suited to TV. McCoy agreed to move to radio-only broadcasts on the previously established Suns Radio Network and was replaced on television play-by-play with Tom Leander, continuing with McCoy's then-color-commentator and broadcast partner Eddie "EJ" Johnson.

=== Radio days and industry recognition (2003–2022) ===
Al McCoy continued to broadcast on radio and online web streaming exclusively, paired with former Sun Tim Kempton (See Suns Radio Network).

On the December 30, 2005, game against the Chicago Bulls, McCoy's consecutive broadcasting streak officially ended due to illness when he woke up in Chicago with a hoarse throat. After finishing his pregame show, it was decided to run mostly audio of the TV broadcast with McCoy adding commentary for small moments, fully returning to the airwaves by the next game.

He was honored by the Naismith Hall of Fame on September 5, 2007, when he became the 17th recipient of the Curt Gowdy Media Award for broadcasters at a ceremony in Springfield, Massachusetts. He thanked his college professor, his high school basketball coach and Jerry Colangelo in his induction speech, and also highlighted the work of fellow basketball broadcasters Marty Glickman and Chick Hearn.

The next month, on October 5, 2007, then-team president Rick Welts and Suns managing partner Robert Sarver unveiled the Al McCoy Media Center, its walls and pillars adorned with photos, history, play-by-play quotes, and words of encouragement and respect from fellow NBA broadcasters honoring the life and career of Al McCoy, in the newly renamed arena pressroom.

McCoy returned to television play-by-play for one night on August 22, 2014, broadcasting the WNBA playoff opening game between the Phoenix Mercury hosting the Los Angeles Sparks for NBATV.

On October 26, 2016, during a Suns home game against the Oklahoma City Thunder, he officially became the longest-tenured broadcaster in NBA History, surpassing Chick Hearn of the Los Angeles Lakers previous broadcasting record. At halftime of the record-setting game, the arena ran a video montage before Suns managing partner Robert Sarver announced that McCoy would become the 15th member of the Suns Ring of Honor, as McCoy wiped a tear from his eye.

He was inducted into the Phoenix Suns Ring of Honor on March 3, 2017, the Suns dedicated their game-winning performance to McCoy, a night which included special messages to McCoy from former Suns Steve Nash and Jason Kidd during timeouts, and a halftime honor from the vast majority of fellow Phoenix Suns Ring of Honor members. In his induction speech, McCoy thanked the organization, the fans and emphasized that "every player that has ever put on a Suns uniform... is special to me, always will be," adding that he still very much feels the thrill of the game when the ball goes in the air, concluding,

If you will continue to accept me, and if God keeps smiling on me, I'm just gonna keep going.

On March 2, 2022, he was again honored by the Suns with "Al McCoy Night" in celebration of his 50th Season with the franchise, during a home game against the Portland Trail Blazers. Video tributes played in the arena, on Suns television and posted on social media featured messages from NBA commissioner Adam Silver, the Inside the NBA crew, and Steve Nash along with former and current Suns players. Longtime Suns TV color-commentator Eddie Johnson shared memories of working together with McCoy in his first years on the job, during the last years of the simulcast. And for one brief moment of a segment, the simulcast was brought back to television for the first time in 19-years as Suns TV ran audio of the live radio broadcast accompanied by live video of McCoy at courtside describing the action. Not interrupting his radio broadcast and during an untelevised timeout, McCoy was given a standing ovation by screaming fans at the Footprint Center as Suns P.A. announced his name to the sold-out arena.

The next month, immediately after the Suns set a new franchise record for the regular season on April 5, 2022, Suns player Devin Booker went to the side, signed his game jersey (writing "To Al, the legend. Franchise record!") and presented it to Al McCoy at his longtime courtside broadcast position (which would end upon his removal from courtside on October 4, 2022), as he shook both of McCoy's hands and congratulated him, saying "50th season, baby! Franchise record. Love you, man. Appreciate you, for real."

Five days later on April 10, 2022, Mayor of Phoenix Kate Gallego issued an official proclamation declaring the date as "Al McCoy Day" in the city of Phoenix, in honor of his 50th season and "to say thank you for guiding us through so many Suns victories and helping us celebrate with a 'Whammo' or 'SHAZAM!' when we needed it the most."

On December 17, 2022, he served as the Grand Marshal of the 2022 Fiesta Bowl Parade.

=== Final seasons and retirement (2022–2023) ===
McCoy was vocal in his opposition of NBA teams and NBA arenas increasingly moving the broadcast locations for radio crews away from the floor and placing them in locations high above courtside where portions of the court are partially obscured. McCoy states in many of these arenas as a result it's difficult to keep track of the three-point field goal. He often highlights a story of broadcaster Joe Tait telling his listening audience during a live play-by-play call that the three-point shot was good "by a player to be named later," due to the angle in TD Garden blocking vantage beyond the three point arc.

McCoy wrote in his autobiography that he prefers broadcasting courtside not only for the complete view of the court, but also because it enables him to keep on top of personnel changes, player and coach interactions, clarification of referee calls, and the general flow of the game for the listening audience.

When fellow broadcasting veteran Hot Rod Hundley's courtside position for the Utah Jazz was moved higher up in the Vivint Arena following the conclusion of the Utah simulcast in 2005, he retired a mere four-years later by 2009 due to the increased strain on his hips and knees. In an essay included in McCoy's autobiography, Hundley described offering fans seated around him his binoculars, writing "It's terrible from upstairs. We make mistakes. On the floor you would never miss a beat."

At the start of the 2010–11 NBA season McCoy began reducing his road games schedule for "select East Coast road trips." By the 2018-19 NBA season he had decided to retire from broadcasting road games altogether. When asked in an interview with ESPN announcer Dave Pasch why he has elected to stop traveling, McCoy stressed the increasingly poor broadcast locations for radio broadcasters and emphasized,

Over the last couple of years I had decided that I didn't want my career to end when the listeners or the viewers would say "What's wrong with McCoy, doesn't he know who's shooting three-pointers or what's going on?"

On October 2, 2022, ahead of the 2022-2023 NBA Season, Al McCoy's Suns home game broadcast location since 1972 and as recent as the 2022 NBA Playoffs in May 2022 was moved from its longtime courtside position on the floor to higher up in the arena, many rows up at the back of the 100s sections, closer to the skybox-area of the Footprint Center.

Video confirming McCoy's new distant broadcast location was posted to the Arizona Sports official YouTube channel on February 24, 2023, recorded during a post-game interview with Ish Wainright.

== Personal life and death ==
McCoy was married to his wife Georgia until her death in 2012, and they have three children. He also had seven grandchildren and six great-grandchildren.

McCoy died on September 21, 2024, at the age of 91.

== Broadcast calls and notable phrases ==
=== Catchphrases ===
- "SHAZAM!" for 3-point shots. McCoy viewed the NBA's adoption of the three-point field goal in 1979 as "like a home run", and felt this acronym for "Solomon, Hercules, Atlas, Zeus, Achilles and Mercury" from his childhood comic book hero Captain Marvel would be fitting.
- "Whammo!", "Whammo Time!", or "Wham Bam Slam!" for slam dunks.
- "Oh, Brother!" after moments of surprise and intensity.
- "Heartbreak Hotel" when a player narrowly misses a shot or the Suns lose a game.
- "Do You Believe It?!" when the Suns make a comeback.
- "Put This One in the 'Ol Deep Freeze" when the game's outcome is imminent.
- "Swish-a-roo for Two!" when a player easily sinks a two-point field goal.
- "Zing Go the Strings!"
- "Twine Time!" referring to the twine of the net swishing.
- "Great Balls of Fire!" for hockey goals by the Phoenix Roadunners, given to Mike Lange, and for shots made by the Suns.
- "The Madhouse on McDowell" for original Suns arena Veterans Memorial Coliseum, also attributed to Chick Hearn.
- "The Purple Palace" for 90's America West Arena.

=== Player nicknames ===
- "The Man with the Velvet Touch" (Walter Davis)
- "Sir Charles" (Charles Barkley)
- "Thunder Dan" (Dan Majerle)
- "The 'O' Show" (Oliver Miller)
- "The Flying Dutchman" (Dick Van Arsdale)
- "The Nash Rambler" (Steve Nash)
- "Captain Kidd" (Jason Kidd)
- "The Matrix" (Shawn Marion), also attributed to Kenny Smith.

== Awards ==
- Curt Gowdy Media Award from the Naismith Memorial Basketball Hall of Fame, 2007.
- Arizona Sports Hall of Fame, 2009.
- Arizona Music & Entertainment Hall of Fame, 2011.
- Iowa Hall of Pride, 2015.
- Phoenix Suns Ring of Honor member, 2017.
- Rocky Mountain Emmy Awards gold circle member, 2022.
- Phoenix Magazine - Voted "Best Play-by-Play" announcer in annual "Best of the Valley" readers poll for 24-years-in-a-row, since magazine inception to present date.

== Broadcast partners ==
- Jack Beveridge
- Jim Wells
- Hot Rod Hundley
- John Shumate
- Tom Ambrose
- Joe Gilmartin
- Dennis Awtrey
- Chick Hearn
- Dick Van Arsdale
- Keith Erickson
- Vinny Del Negro
- Cotton Fitzsimmons
- Tim Kempton
- Eddie Johnson
- Joe Garagiola
- Ann Meyers-Drysdale
- Jon Bloom
- Tim Ring
- Walter Ellis
- Tom Leander

== Suns Radio Network ==
Locally, until he retired, within Phoenix-Metro city limits, Al McCoy's live broadcasts could be heard during Phoenix Suns home games on flagship station 98.7 KMVP-FM or streamed online at the KMVP-FM website, ArizonaSports.com, with road game play-by-play by Jon Bloom.

Nationally, his broadcasts were available on Sirius-XM in the 48 contiguous states.

Globally, they were available on NBA League Pass Audio, anywhere NBA League Pass is offered.

The Suns Radio Network is also syndicated on various AM and FM stations across the state of Arizona, as well as portions of New Mexico and Southern California.
