= Joe Proski =

Polish American retired athletic trainer (born 1939)

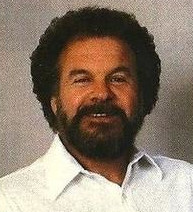
- Proski in 1987
- Born: April 19, 1939 (age 85); Green Bay, Wisconsin, U.S.
- Occupation: athletic trainer
- Years active: 1959–2000

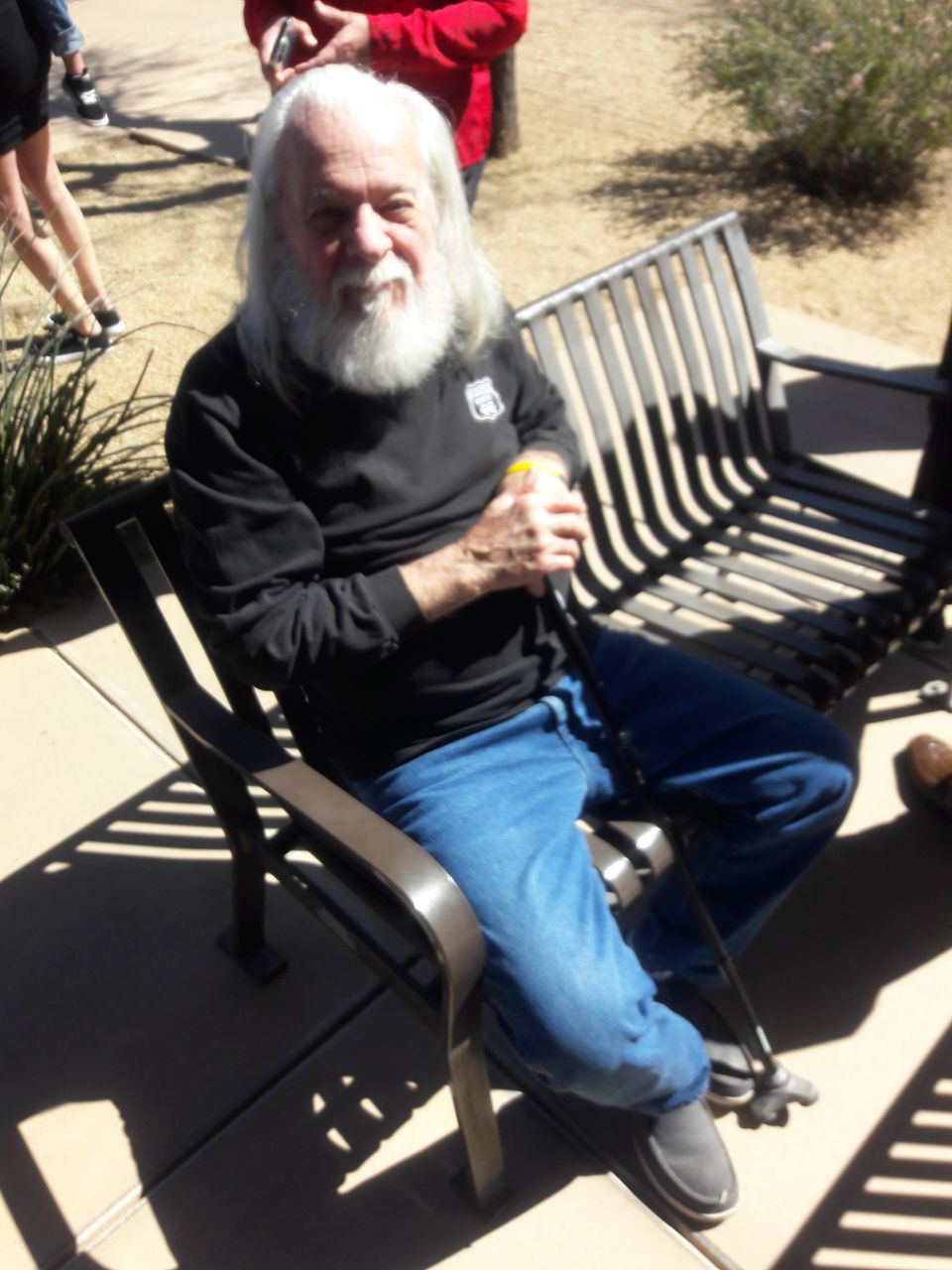
Joe Proski in 2024.

Joe Proski (born April 19, 1939) is a Polish American retired athletic trainer who spent the majority of his career as the head trainer for the National Basketball Association (NBA) Phoenix Suns. After spending one season with the Chicago Bulls, Proski left for the Phoenix Suns in 1968. Proski served as the head athletic trainer in four NBA All-Star Games (1971, 1975, 1985 and 1995) and was named Head Athletic Trainer of the Year in 1988. Following the 1999–2000 NBA season, Proski retired from the NBA. His immediate successor for the position would be Aaron Nelson, who was the Suns assistant athletic trainer from 1993 to 2000. Nelson remained a part of the Suns' training staff until 2019, with him since working with the New Orleans Pelicans. On April 1, 2001, Proski was inducted into the Phoenix Suns Ring of Honor. In 2017, Proski was inducted into the Arizona Athletic Trainers' Association Hall of Fame.

Proski's father, John Proski, was a trainer for the NFL Green Bay Packers. Following the construction of Lambeau Field (then known as City Stadium) in 1957, John Proski became the manager of the venue. Joe Proski grew up to become a fan of the Green Bay Packers due to his father's relationship with the team.

Joe Proski went to Montana State University on a football scholarship and during the summers worked for the Green Bay Dodgers, a Los Angeles Dodgers minor league affiliate in his hometown of Green Bay, as a clubhouse manager. The team's manager, Pete Reiser, urged Proski to pursue a career in training. Proski enrolled at the Gus Mauch Florida School for Athletic Trainers in Kissimmee, Florida and was certified in 1959. He eventually joined the Detroit Tigers physical therapy staff during spring training. His position with the Tigers led him to his first full-time training job with the Chicago Cubs. The Cubs employed Proski for eight years before he left for the NBA. Proski worked as a trainer for the Chicago White Sox minor league affiliate in Tucson, Arizona during the NBA off-season.

== See also ==
- 1968–69 Phoenix Suns season
- 1999–2000 Phoenix Suns season
- List of National Basketball Association retired jersey numbers
- List of Polish Americans
