= Ty-Shon Alexander =

American basketball player (born 1998)

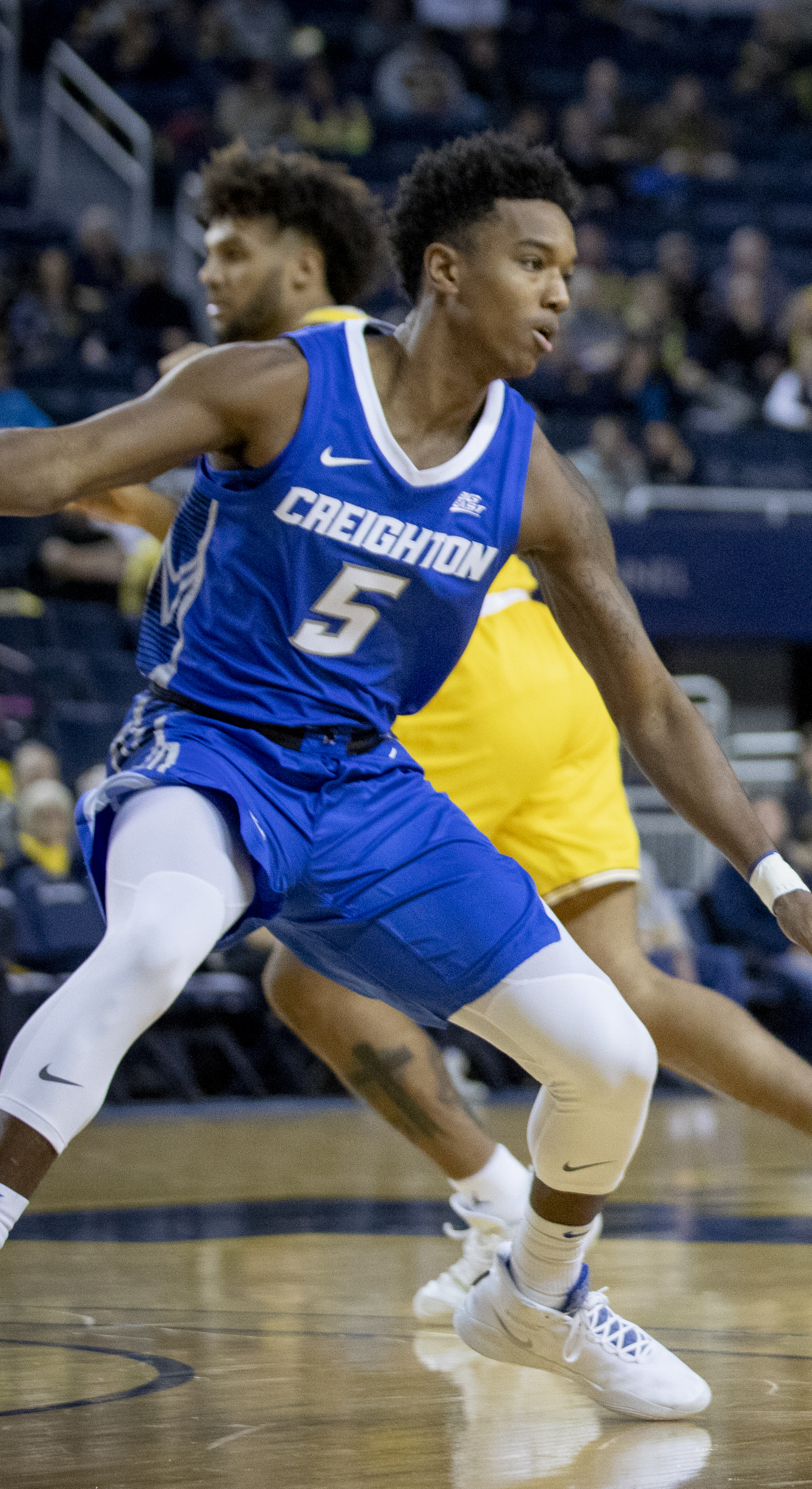
- Alexander (front) with Creighton in 2019

No. 5 – Paisas
- Position: Shooting guard
- League: Baloncesto Profesional Colombiano

Personal information
- Born: July 16, 1998 (age 28) Charlotte, North Carolina, U.S.
- Listed height: 6 ft 3 in (1.91 m)
- Listed weight: 195 lb (88 kg)

Career information
- High school: Concord (Concord, North Carolina); Northside Christian Academy (Charlotte, North Carolina); Oak Hill Academy (Mouth of Wilson, Virginia)
- College: Creighton (2017–2020)
- NBA draft: 2020: undrafted
- Playing career: 2020–present

Career history
- 2020–2021: Phoenix Suns
- 2021: →Canton Charge
- 2021–2022: Virtus Bologna
- 2022: Pallacanestro Trieste
- 2022–2023: Greensboro Swarm
- 2023: Delaware Blue Coats
- 2023–2024: Koroivos
- 2024–2025: Keflavík
- 2025–present: Paisas

Career highlights
- NBA G League champion (2023); Italian Supercup winner (2021); First-team All-Big East (2020)
- Stats at NBA.com
- Stats at Basketball Reference
Medals
Representing the United States
Pan American Games
Bronze medal – third place	2019 Lima	Team

Ty-Shon Leron Alexander (born July 16, 1998) is an American professional basketball player for Paisas of the Baloncesto Profesional Colombiano. He played college basketball for the Creighton Bluejays. Following his college career, Alexander signed with the Phoenix Suns in November 2020 after going undrafted in the 2020 NBA draft. During his rookie season with the Suns, he reached the NBA Finals. Since leaving the Suns, he has split his career between playing the NBA G League and with various teams in Europe.

In 2021 he won the Italian Supercup with Virtus Bologna and in 2023 he won the NBA G League championship with the Delaware Blue Coats. Alexander was a member of the United States national team that finished third at the 2019 Pan American Games in Lima.

== High school career ==
Alexander attended Concord High School his freshman year and was named to the All-South Piedmont 3A Conference team and earned honorable mention on MaxPreps.com's Freshman All-American Team. He transferred to Northside Christian Academy in Charlotte, North Carolina as a sophomore. As a junior, he moved on to Oak Hill Academy. Alexander scored 50 points in a game as a senior. He averaged 14.1 points per game as a senior, shooting 46.3 percent from behind the arc. He was considered a four-star recruit and was ranked No. 85 in his class by Rivals. Alexander committed to Creighton on October 31, 2015, turning down offers from Clemson, Charlotte and Virginia Tech.

== College career ==
On November 20, 2017, Alexander was named Big East freshman of the week after registering 14 points, three rebounds and two assists in a 92–88 victory over Northwestern. He posted 5.5 points, 2.1 rebounds and 1.8 assists per game as a freshman playing backup to Marcus Foster. In the offseason after his freshman year, Alexander made a point to take 100 shots before bed and work on his shooting technique in order to become Creighton's next great scorer. Alexander scored a career-high 36 points on November 22, 2018, in a 87–82 win against Clemson. He was named Big East player of the week on January 28, 2019, after contributing 26 points, seven rebounds, and four assists in a 91–87 win against Georgetown. As a sophomore, Alexander averaged 15.7 points, 4.0 rebounds and 2.7 assists per game. Alexander was an All-Big East Honorable Mention selection alongside teammate Martin Krampelj. Alexander surpassed the 1,000 point mark in a loss to Georgetown on January 16, 2020, finishing with 14 points. At the conclusion of the regular season, Alexander was named to the First Team All-Big East. As a junior, Alexander averaged 16.9 points, 5.0 rebounds, 2.3 assists, and 1.3 steals per game, finishing second in the Big East in free throw percentage at 86 percent and sixth in the conference at three-point shooting at 39.9 percent. Following the season, he declared for the 2020 NBA draft.

== Professional career ==
=== Phoenix Suns (2020–2021) ===
After going undrafted in the 2020 NBA draft, Alexander signed a two-way contract with the Phoenix Suns. Alexander made his NBA debut on December 27, 2020, in a 116–100 win over the Sacramento Kings. He got a rebound and an assist two days later in a blowout 111–86 win over the New Orleans Pelicans. Since the Phoenix Suns did not assign their Northern Arizona Suns franchise to the 2021 NBA G League Bubble at the ESPN Wide World of Sports Complex in Orlando, his G League rights were transferred to the Canton Charge for his rookie season. Alexander made it to the 2021 NBA Finals, but the Suns lost in 6 games to the Milwaukee Bucks. On August 26, 2021, he was waived by the Suns.

=== Virtus Bologna (2021–2022) ===
In September 2021, Alexander signed a two-year deal with Virtus Bologna of the Italian Lega Basket Serie A (LBA). On 21 September, the team won its second Supercup, defeating Olimpia Milano 90–84. However, on 15 February 2022, Alexander and the club agreed on ending the contract.

=== Pallacanestro Trieste (2022) ===
On 15 February 2022, Alexander was signed by Pallacanestro Trieste, another team of LBA.

=== Greensboro Swarm (2022–2023) ===
Alexander joined the Charlotte Hornets for the 2022 NBA Summer League. He later joined the Greensboro Swarm training camp roster. On November 4, 2022, he was named to the opening night roster.

=== Delaware Blue Coats (2023) ===
On February 24, 2023, Alexander was traded to the Delaware Blue Coats, and eventually helped the team win the NBA G League title.

=== Koroivos (2023–2024) ===
On November 22, 2023, he joined Koroivos of the Greek A2 Elite League. He went on to average 17.5 points per game, being one of the best players in the league.

=== Panionios (2024) ===
On June 26, 2024, he joined Panionios of the Greek Basket League. He left the team without appearing in a single game for them.

=== Keflavík (2024–2025) ===
On November 13, 2024, Alexander signed with Keflavík of the Icelandic Úrvalsdeild karla. During the regular season, he averaged 20.5 points, 4.9 rebounds and 4.5 assists. On 27 March 2025, he scored a season high 38 points in Keflavík's 119–114 win against Þór Þorlákshöfn in the last game of the regular season, securing the final berth in the playoffs. In the playoffs, he averaged 18.3 points, 3.7 rebounds and 7.0 assists in Keflavík's 0–3 first round loss against Tindastóll.

== National team career ==
In the summer of 2019, Alexander was a part of the United States National team who competed at the Pan American Games in Peru. The team won bronze.

== Personal life ==
Alexander is the son of Eric and Tina Alexander. He has one brother, Rodjrick.

== Career statistics ==
Legend
GP	Games played	GS	Games started	MPG	Minutes per game
FG%	Field goal percentage	3P%	3-point field goal percentage	FT%	Free throw percentage
RPG	Rebounds per game	APG	Assists per game	SPG	Steals per game
BPG	Blocks per game	PPG	Points per game	**Bold**	Career high

=== NBA ===
==== Regular season ====
Year	Team	GP	GS	MPG	FG%	3P%	FT%	RPG	APG	SPG	BPG	PPG
2020–21	Phoenix	15	0	3.2	.250	.222	.500	.7	.4	.0	.1	.6
Career		15	0	3.2	.250	.222	.500	.7	.4	.0	.1	.6

==== Playoffs ====
Year	Team	GP	GS	MPG	FG%	3P%	FT%	RPG	APG	SPG	BPG	PPG
2021	Phoenix	1	0	1.3	1.000	—	—	.0	.0	.0	.0	2.0
Career		1	0	1.3	1.000	—	—	.0	.0	.0	.0	2.0

=== College ===
Year	Team	GP	GS	MPG	FG%	3P%	FT%	RPG	APG	SPG	BPG	PPG
2017–18	Creighton	33	1	17.7	.418	.333	.707	2.1	1.8	.3	.1	5.5
2018–19	Creighton	**34**	**34**	32.6	.406	.365	.794	4.0	**2.7**	1.2	**.3**	15.7
2019–20	Creighton	31	31	**34.7**	**.431**	**.399**	**.860**	**5.0**	2.3	**1.3**	**.3**	**16.9**
Career		98	66	28.2	.418	.372	.813	3.7	2.3	.9	.2	12.7
