= Dot Wilkinson =

American sports woman (1921–2023)

Personal information
- Born: Dorothy Elsie Wilkinson; October 9, 1921 South Phoenix, Phoenix, Arizona, U.S.
- Died: March 18, 2023 (aged 101) Phoenix, Arizona, U.S.

Sport
Sport
- Softball
- ten-pin bowling

Dorothy Elsie Wilkinson (October 9, 1921 – March 18, 2023) was an American softball player and bowler, who is a member of the hall of fame in both sports.

== Life and career ==
Wilkinson played softball from 1933 to 1965, helping her team, the Phoenix Ramblers, win the national title in 1940, 1948, and 1949. She was an All-American for 19 seasons as an amateur softball player. Among her feats, she batted an average of .455 in 1954, .450 in 1955, and .387 on the Ramblers championship runner up year of 1957. As a professional bowler, she won the Women's International Bowling Queen's Tournament (a bowling triple crown event) in 1962, and the WIBC singles in 1963.

Wilkinson was inducted into the National Softball Hall of Fame and Museum in Oklahoma City, Oklahoma in 1970, her first year of eligibility. She was inducted into the International Bowling Hall of Fame in Arlington, Texas in 1990. She occasionally attended high school, college, and tournament softball games in Arizona, where she and some of her former teammates were often honored. The Arizona Republic newspaper said she was eighth on a list of Arizona's all-time greatest athletes in 1999.

As of April 2020, Wilkinson was the oldest living member of the Arizona Sports Hall of Fame in Phoenix. She turned 100 in October 2021 and died in Phoenix on March 18, 2023, at the age of 101.

== Honors ==
Association	Year	results
National Softball Hall of Fame and Museum	1970	Honoured
International Bowling Hall of Fame	1990	Honoured
Arizona Sports Hall of Fame	1975	Honoured
