= Linda Vollstedt =

American sports coach

Biographical details
- Born: November 2, 1946 (age 79); Portland, Oregon, U.S.

Playing career
- 1964-68: Arizona State

Coaching career (HC unless noted)
- 1980-2001: Arizona State

Accomplishments and honors

Championships
- 6x NCAA Division I Women's Golf Championships (1990, 1993, 1994, 1995, 1997, 1998)

Linda Vollstedt (born November 2, 1946) is the development director for the Arizona State Sun Devils since 2001. Before holding her executive position, Vollstedt was the women's golf coach for the Sun Devils from 1980 to 2001. During her tenure as golf coach, she was the winning coach in six NCAA Division I Women's Golf Championships during the 1990s. Vollstetdt was named to the International Women's Sports Hall of Fame in 2003 and into the Arizona Sports Hall of Fame in 2009.

== Early life and education ==
Vollstedt was born in Portland, Oregon on November 2, 1946. From Arizona State University, she earned a Bachelor of Science in 1969 with an accompanying Master of Science in 1971 and specialized in math.

== Career ==
Vollstedt began her career as a golf player for the Arizona State Sun Devils from 1964 to 1968. Throughout the 1970s, she was a golf coach at the Alhambra High School in Phoenix, Arizona. In 1980, she returned to Arizona State to become the women's golf coach for the university. During her tenure, Vollstedt was the winning coach of the Pac-12 Conference golf championships five times through the 1980s and the NCAA Division I Women's Golf Championships six times during the 1990s. She remained as the Sun Devils golf coach until her retirement in 2001. After leaving her coaching position, she remained with Arizona State as a development director starting in 2001.

== Awards and honors ==
For her Coach of the Year awards, Vollstedt was selected by the LPGA in 1986 and 1993. She was chosen by the Women's Golf Coaches Association in 1989 and 1994. Vollstedt shared this award in 1995. Vollstedt was also the Coach of the Year for the Pac-12 Conference in 1989. She re-won this award consecutively between 1993 and 1995.

Southwest PGA gave her the 1999 Anser Award for "significant and impactful contributions to ... golf throughout the state of Arizona." WGCA presented her with the Gladys Palmer Meritorious Service Award in 2003. In 2016, Vollstedt was selected as the Pac-12 Conference Golf Coach of the Century.

Vollstedt was inducted into the Women's Golf Coaches Association Coaches Hall of Fame during 1994 and the International Women's Sports Hall of Fame during 2003. She was also named to the Arizona Sports Hall of Fame in 2009 and the Pac-12 Conference Hall of Honor in 2018. She entered the LPGA Professionals Hall of Fame during 2020.

== Personal life ==
Vollstedt broke her tibia during a golf accident in 1997 and had a follow-up knee surgery in 2003.
