= Phoenix Suns Ring of Honor =

Internal basketball team award

The Ring of Honor is an award given to prominent players and employees of the professional basketball team, the Phoenix Suns of the National Basketball Association (NBA). Awardees are selected to recognize the significant role the individual has had for the Suns organization (not specifically their prominence in the NBA). While Phoenix retired numbers early in the franchise's history, recent players inducted into the Ring of Honor had their names and numbers displayed at the Suns' home arena, Mortgage Matchup Center, but the numbers could be reused in the future. However, beginning in the 2023–24 season, under new owner Mat Ishbia, the Suns resumed retiring jersey numbers on the Ring of Honor starting with No. 31 for Shawn Marion and No. 32 for Amar'e Stoudemire. Numbers who were previously deemed "honored" by the franchise were once again considered retired.

The Ring of Honor was opened on April 18, 1999. Tom Chambers was honored that day, joined by Connie Hawkins, Dick Van Arsdale, Alvan Adams, Paul Westphal and Walter Davis, who were moved from the Banners for Retired Numbers section at then-named America West Arena into the new ring. At the time, the Suns' Tom Gugliotta was already wearing No. 24, Chambers' former number, and would be the last player to date to wear the number. In 2001, Phoenix added Kevin Johnson to the ring while also making an exception and retiring his No. 7. Since Johnson's number retirement, former athletic trainer Joe Proski, Dan Majerle, Charles Barkley, former coach Cotton Fitzsimmons, former team owner and general manager Jerry Colangelo, Steve Nash, and broadcaster Al McCoy were also honored by the Suns, though the numbers for Barkley, Majerle, and Nash were only honored and not officially considered retired numbers at the time. However, with the Phoenix Suns Ring of Honor being "reimagined" and unveiled with permanent banners and murals once again on October 28, 2023, the numbers worn by Barkley, Chambers, Majerle, and Nash are considered properly retired. Shawn Marion joined the Ring of Honor on December 15, 2023, while Amar'e Stoudemire's #32 joined on March 2, 2024.

Key
*	Retired number
	Inducted to the Basketball Hall of Fame

Inductees
Honoree	Jersey No.	Position	Tenure	Initial Date of Honor/Jersey retired	Notes
Alvan Adams	33*	C	1975–1988	November 9, 1988	Played entire career as a Sun, NBA Rookie of the Year, Phoenix's career leader in games played (988), minutes played (27,203), rebounds (6,937) and steals (1,289)
Charles Barkley	34*	F	1992–1996	March 20, 2004	One of the 50 Greatest Players in NBA history; Hall of Famer; gold medalist with the Dream Team at the 1992 Olympics; won the NBA MVP award in 1993 and led Suns to NBA Finals the same year; is an Emmy award winning broadcaster for the NBA on TNT
Tom Chambers	24*	F	1988–1993	April 18, 1999	Four-time NBA All-Star (three as a Sun); works in Suns community relations; is a broadcaster for Suns games
Jerry Colangelo	—	GM, coach, owner, executive	1968–2004	November 4, 2007	Four-time NBA Executive of the Year, Hall of Famer, youngest general manager in US professional sports
Walter Davis	6*	G	1977–1988	April 3, 1994	Gold Medalist at the 1976 Olympics, NBA Rookie of the Year (1978), Phoenix's all-time leading scorer (15,666), six-time NBA All-Star
Cotton Fitzsimmons	—	Coach	1970–1972, 1988–1992, 1996	March 18, 2005	Suns head coach with a 341–208 record, two times NBA Coach of the Year (with Suns, 1988–89 season), Missouri Basketball Hall of Famer, National Junior College Hall of Famer, Missouri Sports Hall of Famer
Connie Hawkins	42*	F	1969–1973	November 19, 1976	American Basketball League's MVP (1962), Harlem Globetrotter (1964–66), American Basketball Association champion (1967's Pittsburgh Pipers), Hall of Famer, worked in Suns community relations until his death in 2017.
Kevin Johnson	7*	G	1988–1998, 2000	March 7, 2001	Suns leader in free throws made (3,851) and free throws attempted (4,579); came out of retirement on March 23, 2000, after Suns point guard Jason Kidd was out due to injury; Mayor of Sacramento, California (2008–2016)
John MacLeod	—	Coach	1973–1987	April 18, 2012	Suns winningest head coach of all time (579) and longest-tenured Suns head coach, a top 20 winningest head coach (707), 6th winningest head coach based on services made for one team, Assistant head coach 1999-2000, Coach of five other Ring of Honor players, 1995 Big East Coach of the Year, Indiana Basketball Hall of Famer, Arizona Sports Hall of Famer
Dan Majerle	9*	F	1988–1995, 2001–2002	March 9, 2003	Played first seven seasons in Phoenix and concluded his career as a Sun; bronze medalist at the 1988 Olympics. 1994 Gold Medalist USA Men's Basketball World Championship in Toronto, Canada.
Shawn Marion	31*	F	1999–2008	December 15, 2023	Played 660 regular season games from 1999 to 2008, averaging 18.4 points on 48.1% shooting, 10.0 rebounds, 1.9 steals and 1.4 blocks. He ranks fifth in franchise history in points (12,134), second in rebounds (6,616), second in steals (1,245) and third in blocks (894). Four-time All-Star, Two-time All NBA
Al McCoy	—	Announcer	1972–2023	March 3, 2017	Longest tenured broadcaster in NBA history at 51 seasons with the Suns; Missed only one game throughout his time as an announcer for the team. Won the Curt Gowdy Media Award in 2007 for his electronic media personality and charisma throughout the league; Also, a member of the Broadcasters Hall of Fame and Iowa Hall of Pride.
Steve Nash	13*	G	1996–1998, 2004–2012	October 30, 2015	Suns leader in assists made (6,997); won the NBA MVP award in 2005 and 2006; eight-time All-Star (six with the Suns); He ranks second in franchise history in three-point field goals (1,051).
Joe Proski	—	Athletic trainer	1968–2000	April 1, 2001	Only athletic trainer during the franchise's first 32 seasons, Arizona Sports Personality of the Year (1979), NBA Athletic Trainer of the Year (1988)
Amar'e Stoudemire	32*	F	2002–2010	March 2, 2024	Stoudemire played 516 regular season games, averaging 21.4 points on 54.4% shooting, 8.9 rebounds and 1.4 blocks. He ranks seventh in franchise history in points (11,035), fifth in scoring average (21.4), third in rebounds (4,613) and fifth in blocks (722). Was named All-NBA four times, including to the First Team in 2006–07, was a five-time All-Star selection and the 2002-03 NBA Rookie of the Year during his time with the Suns.
Dick Van Arsdale	5*	G	1968–1977	November 13, 1977	Scored franchise's first point (October 18, 1968), fifth highest scorer in club history (12,060), Vice President of Basketball Operations for the Suns
Paul Westphal	44*	G, coach	Player: 1975–1980, 1983–1984; Head coach: 1992–1996	April 15, 1989	Phoenix's eighth all-time leading scorer (9,564), Phoenix's top scorer each season, assistant coach for the Suns (1988–92), head coach for the Suns (1992–96)
