= Arizona Sports Hall of Fame =

The Arizona Sports Hall of Fame is a sports hall of fame in the United States honoring any athlete who has "merited recognition and distinction in sports and who has brought fame and honor to the State of Arizona through outstanding sporting accomplishments or contributions." According to the hall's official website, individuals are eligible by meeting one of three criteria:

1. A native of Arizona
2. Immediately recognized as an Arizonian
3. Has made at least two significant contributions in the athletic community in the State of Arizona

Additionally, the final say and responsibility of who is inducted belongs to the Arizona Sports Hall of Fame Trustee Board.

The hall was founded in 1957 by the Phoenix Press Box Association, and held induction ceremonies regularly until 2002, when it fell dormant. It was revitalized in 2009 by the Phoenix Regional Sports Commission, which owns and operates the hall to this day.

The 45th class, inducted on April 8, 2015, included Charles Barkley, Danielle Ammaccapane, Cotton Fitzsimmons, Joe Gilmartin, and Luis Gonzalez.

== Inductees ==
| Year inducted | Name | Contributions |
|---|---|---|
| 1957 | Lewis Tewanima | Track and field |
| 1958 | Pop McKale | American football, baseball, basketball |
| 1958 | Jess Mortensen | Track and field |
| 1959 | Art Nehf | Baseball |
| 1960 | Thornton Lee | Baseball |
| 1960 | Robbie Robinson | American football |
| 1961 | Charles Borah | Track and field |
| 1962 | Earl Grace | Baseball |
| 1963 | Hank Leiber | Baseball |
| 1964 | Jimmy Bryan | Auto racing |
| 1964 | Joseph Lancer | Baseball |
| 1965 | Vic Housholder | Various |
| 1965 | E. Earl Pomeroy | American football |
| 1966 | George Hoy | Various |
| 1966 | Rudy Lavik | American football, basketball |
| 1967 | Milt Coggins | Golf |
| 1968 | Doc Pardee | Thoroughbred horse racing |
| 1968 | Wilford "Whizzer" White | Track and field, American football |
| 1969 | Fred Enke | American football, baseball, basketball, golf |
| 1970 | Miles W. Casteel | American football |
| 1971 | Bobby Ball | Auto racing |
| 1971 | Edgar "Mutt" Ford | American football |
| 1972 | Dallas Long | Track and field |
| 1972 | Frank Sancet | Baseball |
| 1973 | Joe Famulatte | Various |
| 1974 | Clyde B. Smith | American football |
| 1975 | Bob Housholder | Softball, big-game hunting |
| 1975 | Warren Livingston | American football |
| 1975 | Dot Wilkinson | Softball, bowling |
| 1976 | Patsy Willard | Diving |
| 1977 | Fred Enke Jr. | American football |
| 1977 | Bill Miller | Track and field |
| 1978 | Johnny Bulla | Golf |
| 1978 | Art Van Haren | Baseball, softball |
| 1979 | Shanty Hogan | Baseball |
| 1980 | Clint Brawner | Auto racing |
| 1980 | Roger McCluskey | Auto racing |
| 1981 | Dick Van Arsdale | Basketball |
| 1982 | Ed Doherty | American football |
| 1984 | Bob Goldwater | Golf |
| 1984 | Karsten Solheim | Golf |
| 1985 | Ned Wulk | Basketball |
| 1986 | Ed Long | Basketball |
| 1987 | Kathy Gibbons | Track and field |
| 1987 | Jack Stewart | American football |
| 1987 | Frank Gianelli | Sportswriting |
| 1987 | Bob Allison | Sportswriting |
| 1988 | Alvan Adams | Basketball |
| 1988 | Larry Walker | Fastpitch softball |
| 1988 | Dave Hicks | Sportswriting |
| 1989 | Frank Kush | American football |
| 1989 | John Riggle | Golf |
| 1989 | Abe Chanin | Sportswriting |
| 1989 | George McLeod | Sportswriting |
| 1990 | Danny White | American football |
| 1990 | Dwight Patterson | Baseball |
| 1990 | Bob Vache | Sports broadcasting |
| 1991 | Al Van Hazel | American football, track and field |
| 1991 | Rose Mofford | Softball |
| 1991 | Ben Avery | Sportswriting |
| 1999 | Herman Frazier | Track and field |
| 2001 | Jim Brock | Baseball |
| 2001 | Charlie Hickox | Swimming |
| 2002 | Jerry Colangelo | Arena football, baseball, basketball, hockey, soccer |
| 2002 | Curley Culp | American football, wrestling |
| 2009 | Al McCoy | Sports broadcasting |
| 2009 | Linda Vollstedt | Golf |
| 2009 | Bob Horner | Baseball |
| 2009 | Darren Woodson | American football |
| 2010 | Billie Harris | Softball |
| 2010 | Billy Mayfair | Golf |
| 2010 | Bob Baffert | Horse training |
| 2010 | Sean Elliott | Basketball |
| 2010 | Lute Olson | Basketball |
| 2011 | Randall McDaniel | American football |
| 2011 | Curt Schilling | Baseball |
| 2011 | Kerri Strug | Gymnastics |
| 2011 | Ty Murray | Rodeo |
| 2011 | 1996–97 Arizona Wildcats men's basketball team | Basketball |
| 2012 | Misty Hyman | Swimming |
| 2012 | Rodney Peete | American football |
| 2012 | Tim Salmon | Baseball |
| 2012 | 2912 Cactus League | Baseball |
| 2012 | Jake Plummer | American football |
| 2013 | Karl Eller | American football, basketball |
| 2013 | Fat Lever | Basketball |
| 2013 | Michele Mitchell | Diving |
| 2013 | Heather Farr | Golf |
| 2014 | Jerry Dawnson | Baseball |
| 2014 | Scott Hogsett | Rugby |
| 2014 | Emmett "Buddy" Jobe | Auto racing |
| 2014 | Art Mortori | Wrestling |
| 2015 | Danielle Ammaccapane | Golf |
| 2015 | Charles Barkley | Basketball |
| 2015 | Cotton Fitzsimmons | Basketball |
| 2015 | Joe Gilmartin | Sportswriting |
| 2015 | Luis Gonzalez | Baseball |
| 2016 | Bob Bondurant | Auto racing |
| 2016 | Randy Johnson | Baseball |
| 2016 | John MacLeod | Basketball |
| 2016 | Erik Widmark | American football |
| 2016 | Adrian Wilson | American football |
| 2016 | Royce Youree | Basketball |
| 2017 | Bill Bidwill | American football |
| 2017 | Paola Boivin | Sportswriting |
| 2017 | Shane Doan | Hockey |
| 2017 | Dan Majerle | Basketball |
| 2017 | Anthony Robles | Wrestling |
| 2018 | Mike Candrea | Softball |
| 2018 | Mark Grace | Baseball |
| 2018 | Gary Hall Jr. | Swimming |
| 2018 | Jeff Oscarson | Softball |
| 2018 | Pat Tillman | American football |
| 2018 | Sistor Lynn Winsor | Golf |
| 2019 | Michael Carbajal | Boxing |
| 2019 | Tom Chambers | Basketball |
| 2019 | Derrick Hall | Baseball |
| 2019 | Michael Nesbitt | Athletic trainer |
| 2019 | Dick Tomey | American football |
| 2019 | Amy Van Dyken | Swimming |
| 2020/2021 | John Bridger | Golf |
| 2020/2021 | Joe Caldwell | Basketball |
| 2020/2021 | Ann Meyers | Basketball |
| 2020/2021 | Andre Ethier | Baseball |
| 2020/2021 | Roland Hemond | Baseball |
| 2020/2021 | Paul Westphal | Basketball |
| 2022 | Larry Fitzgerald | American football |
| 2022 | Pedro Gomez | Journalist |
| 2023 | Jennifer Gillom | Basketball |
| 2023 | Peggy Kennedy | Basketball |
| 2023 | Mike Kennedy | Contributor |
| 2023 | Karen Self | Basketball |
| 2024 | Michael Bidwill | American football |
| 2024 | Melissa Belote | Swimming |
| 2024 | Mike Bibby | Basketball |
| 2024 | Julie Ertz | Soccer |
| 2024 | Joe Garagiola Jr. | Baseball |
| 2024 | Ricky Hunley | American football |
| 2024 | Paul Konerko | Baseball |
| 2024 | Matt Shott | Ice hockey |
| 2025 | Michael Bates | Track and field, American football |
| 2025 | Frank Busch | Swimming |
| 2025 | Craig Girard | Skydiving |
| 2025 | J. J. Hardy | Baseball |
| 2025 | Michael Pantalione | Soccer |
| 2025 | Diana Taurasi | Basketball |
| 2025 | George Young | Track and field |
