= Dan Majerle =

American basketball player (born 1965)

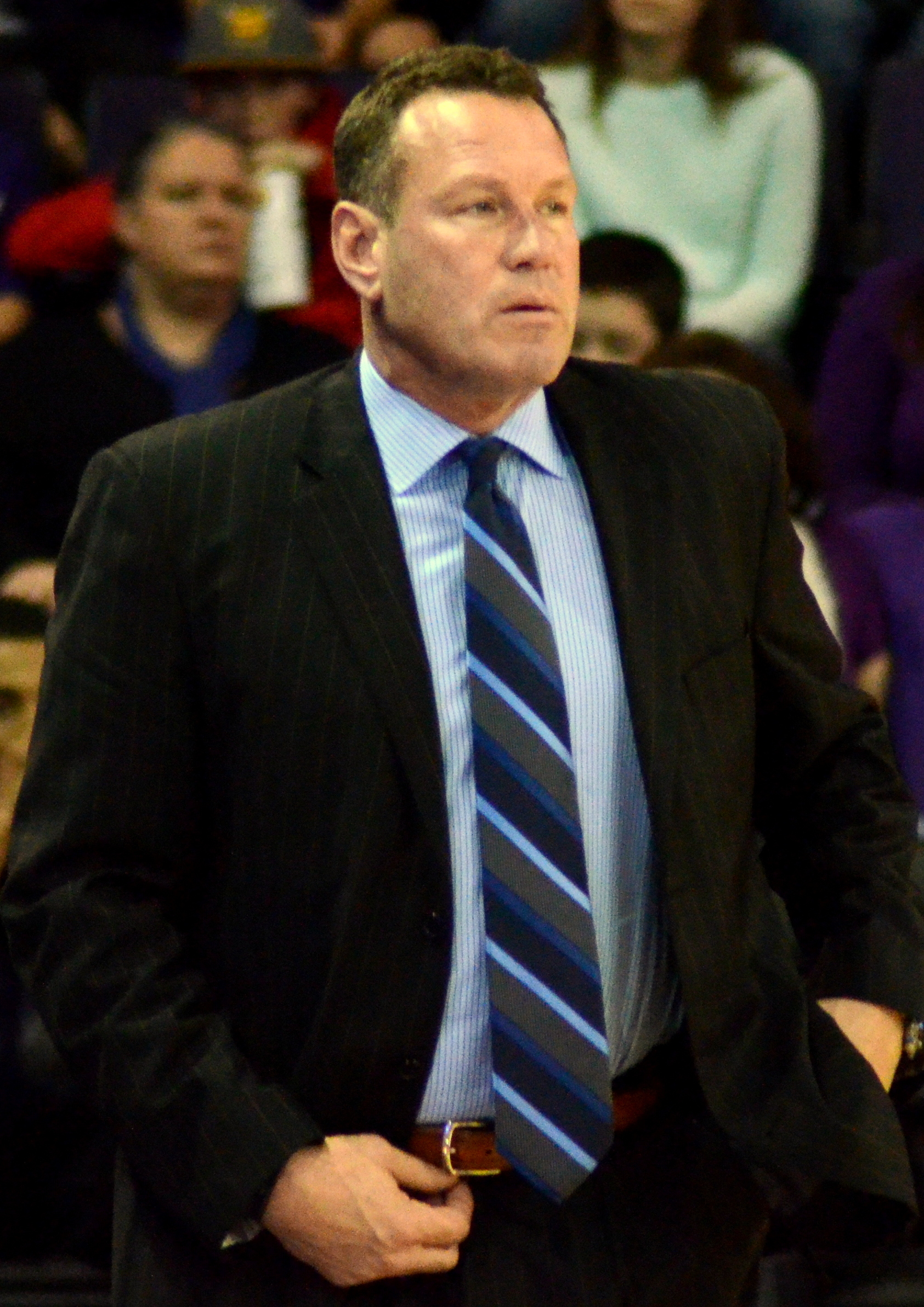
- Majerle in 2015

Personal information
- Born: September 9, 1965 (age 61) Traverse City, Michigan, U.S.
- Listed height: 6 ft 6 in (1.98 m)
- Listed weight: 222 lb (101 kg)

Career information
- High school: Traverse City (Traverse City, Michigan)
- College: Central Michigan (1984–1988)
- NBA draft: 1988: 1st round, 14th overall pick
- Drafted by: Phoenix Suns
- Playing career: 1988–2002
- Position: Shooting guard / small forward
- Number: 9
- Coaching career: 2008–2020

Career history

Playing
- 1988–1995: Phoenix Suns
- 1995–1996: Cleveland Cavaliers
- 1996–2001: Miami Heat
- 2001–2002: Phoenix Suns

Coaching
- 2008–2013: Phoenix Suns (associate HC)
- 2013–2020: Grand Canyon

Career highlights
- As player: 3× NBA All-Star (1992, 1993, 1995); 2× NBA All-Defensive Second Team (1991, 1993); No. 9 retired by Phoenix Suns; 3× First-team All-MAC (1986–1988); MAC tournament MVP (1987); No. 44 retired by Central Michigan Chippewas; USA Basketball Male Athlete of the Year (1988)

Career NBA statistics
- Points: 10,925 (11.4 ppg)
- Rebounds: 4,265 (4.5 rpg)
- Assists: 2,755 (2.9 apg)
- Stats at NBA.com
- Stats at Basketball Reference
Medals
Representing United States
Men's basketball
Bronze medal – third place	1988 Seoul	National team
World Championships
Gold medal – first place	1994 Toronto	National team

Daniel Lewis Majerle (/ˈmɑːrli/; born September 9, 1965), also known by the nickname "Thunder Dan", is an American former professional basketball player and former coach of the Grand Canyon Antelopes. He played 14 years in the National Basketball Association (NBA) with the Phoenix Suns, Miami Heat, and Cleveland Cavaliers. He won a bronze medal with the U.S. national team at the 1988 Summer Olympics in Seoul, and a gold medal at the 1994 FIBA World Championship.

== Early years ==
Majerle was born and raised in Traverse City, Michigan. He starred for Traverse City High School (now Central) and Central Michigan University in Mount Pleasant, where he played for four years with averages of 21.8 points and 8.9 rebounds a game. In 1987, he helped lead the Chippewas to the 1987 NCAA Division I men's basketball tournament. He held the school season record for points until Marcus Keene broke the mark in the 2016–17 season.

Majerle was a three-time first team All-MAC selection (1986–88) and led the conference in both scoring (23.7) and rebounding (10.3) in 1988. He was on the MAC All-Tournament teams in 1987 and 1988, earning tournament MVP honors in 1987. In his final season, his brother Jeff joined the team.

Majerle's great-grandfather Frank Majerle Sr. emigrated to the United States in 1901 at age 20 from what is now Slovenia but was then part of Austria-Hungary. Frank Sr. settled in Haring, Michigan, and married American-born Anna Suhorepec (anglicized to Suhropetz) whose parents were also from Slovenia.

== NBA career ==
=== Phoenix Suns (1988–1995) ===
The Suns selected Majerle with the 14th pick of the 1988 NBA draft, which the Suns acquired (along with Kevin Johnson) in a trade from the Cleveland Cavaliers for Larry Nance. During the draft, he was promptly booed when his name was announced over the public address system. Suns coach Cotton Fitzsimmons publicly chastised the Suns fans and told them "you'll be sorry you ever booed this young man". In his rookie season Majerle played in 54 games and started in 5, averaging 8.6 points as a bench player. The Suns won 55 games and made the playoffs, and Majerle increased his scoring average to 14.3 points a game as Phoenix advanced all the way to the Western Conference Finals before losing to the defending champion Los Angeles Lakers.

The young Majerle continued to be used as a backup for the next two seasons and became popular for his impressive jumping ability and "thunderous" slam dunk that would lead to his nickname "Thunder Dan". During the 1989–90 season, he started in 23 games and increased his scoring average to 11 points a game as the Suns again advanced to the Western Conference Finals before being eliminated by the Portland Trail Blazers. Despite another successful season for Majerle and the Suns in the 1990–91 season, they fell in the first round of the playoffs to the Utah Jazz. Majerle had become an effective three-point shooter and defensive specialist, and was named to the 1990–91 NBA All-Defensive Second team at the conclusion of the season.

The 1992 season featured more improvement for Majerle, who had become an even more effective three-point shooter and defensive specialist. Despite starting in just 15 of the 82 games he played in, Majerle was selected to play in the 1992 NBA All-Star Game. The Suns again made the playoffs but lost in the conference semifinals to Portland. In the offseason, Phoenix managed to pull off a major step towards an NBA title, as they acquired superstar forward Charles Barkley in a trade with the Philadelphia 76ers.

==== 1993: Trip to the Finals ====
The Suns had improved significantly with the addition of Barkley. The departure of shooting guard Jeff Hornacek moved Majerle into the starting job there. The result was a 62-win season for Phoenix, with Barkley winning the Most Valuable Player Award and Majerle finishing second on the team in scoring and being named to his second NBA All-Defensive Second Team. Majerle also led the NBA in three-point field goals made and attempted, and scored 18 points in the 1993 NBA All-Star Game. The Suns entered the playoffs as the number 1 seed in the Western Conference, and defeated the Lakers, the San Antonio Spurs and the Seattle SuperSonics to reach the NBA Finals. Majerle averaged 15 points in the playoffs and postedbig games such as a 34-point performance in the 5th game against Seattle. In the Finals, the Suns faced the defending champion Chicago Bulls, led by Michael Jordan and Scottie Pippen. Majerle performed well in the Suns win in game 3, scoring 28 points in the win in Chicago. Despite having home court advantage, however, the Suns could not best the Bulls, who won in 6 games to earn their third straight championship.

==== Last years in Phoenix ====
Majerle would again lead the league in three-point field goals and attempts in the 1993–94 season, as the Suns won 56 games and made the playoffs before losing to the eventual champion Houston Rockets in a 7-game semifinal series. He would then go on to play for Team USA and win in the World Championships in Canada. He would earn another selection to the All-Star game in the following season, scoring 10 points in the 1995 NBA All-Star Game which was held in Phoenix. Majerle started in 46 games, playing small forward often as the team featured Wesley Person at shooting guard and veteran A.C. Green at power forward. The Suns again lost in the semifinals to Houston in 7 games, and Majerle was traded to the Cleveland Cavaliers in the offseason.

=== Cleveland Cavaliers (1995–1996) ===
In Cleveland, Majerle was used as a reserve at small forward, starting in 15 of the 82 games behind Chris Mills and averaging 10.6 points a game. The Cavaliers won 47 games before losing to the New York Knicks in a 3-game sweep in the first round, with Majerle increasing his scoring to 16.7 (second on the team) during the series. In the offseason the Cavaliers released Majerle, and he would go on to sign with the Miami Heat.

=== Miami Heat (1996–2001) ===
The Heat were a team with a bright future, as they featured all-stars Alonzo Mourning and Tim Hardaway, and were coached by Pat Riley. Injuries limited Majerle to 36 games during the 1996–97 season, as the Heat managed to win a franchise-best 61 games and the Atlantic Division. During the regular season, on December 7, 1996, against the Chicago Bulls, Majerle made a three-pointer with one second remaining to win the game 83–80. In the playoffs, the veteran Majerle was in healthy shape, and the Heat beat the up-and-coming Orlando Magic in the first round before facing the Knicks in a grueling 7-game series in which Majerle scored 18 points in the sixth game. The Heat would eventually fall to the defending champion Chicago Bulls in the Eastern Conference Finals in 5 games.

Majerle would again play as the team's backup small forward in the 1997–98 season, averaging 7 points a game as one of the team's main three-point threats, and Miami would post another winning season before losing to New York in the first round of the playoffs. The 1998–99 season would be shortened to 50 games as a result of a league lockout, and with teammate Voshon Lenard hurt for much of the season, Majerle stepped in to start in 48 games. Miami won another Atlantic Division title, but again lost to New York in 5 games in the first round.

The team continued to use Majerle as a starter during the 1999–2000 season, as he started in 69 of 82 games and again averaged 7 points during the season. In the playoffs, Miami defeated the Detroit Pistons in the first round before facing the Knicks in another 7-game series in which New York again prevailed. Majerle averaged 9 points in the playoffs and led the team with 20 three-point field goals. In the 2000 offseason it was revealed that Alonzo Mourning would not play as a result of a kidney disease, and the 2000–01 season would feature new acquisitions such as Eddie Jones and Anthony Mason, and Majerle would serve as a reserve. The Heat would lose in the first round of the playoffs in a sweep to the Charlotte Hornets, and in the offseason Majerle would sign a deal returning to his original team in Phoenix.

=== Return to Phoenix (2001–2002) ===
In his return to the Suns, Majerle received much praise and applause from the hometown Suns fans, playing in 65 games and leading the team in three-point field goals made with 79. His NBA career finished on April 17, 2002, when he officially retired as a member of his original team.

== NBA career statistics ==
Legend
GP	Games played	GS	Games started	MPG	Minutes per game
FG%	Field goal percentage	3P%	3-point field goal percentage	FT%	Free throw percentage
RPG	Rebounds per game	APG	Assists per game	SPG	Steals per game
BPG	Blocks per game	PPG	Points per game	**Bold**	Career high
*	Led the league

=== Regular season ===
Year	Team	GP	GS	MPG	FG%	3P%	FT%	RPG	APG	SPG	BPG	PPG
1988–89	Phoenix	54	5	25.1	.419	.329	.614	3.9	2.4	1.2	.3	8.6
1989–90	Phoenix	73	23	30.7	.424	.238	.762	**5.9**	2.6	1.4	.4	11.1
1990–91	Phoenix	77	7	29.6	**.484**	.349	.762	5.4	2.8	1.4	**.5**	13.6
1991–92	Phoenix	**82**	15	34.8	.478	**.382**	.756	**5.9**	3.3	1.6	**.5**	**17.3**
1992–93	Phoenix	**82**	**82**	39.0	.464	.381	.778	4.7	3.8	**1.7**	.4	16.9
1993–94	Phoenix	80	76	**40.1**	.418	**.382**	.739	4.4	3.4	1.6	**.5**	16.5
1994–95	Phoenix	**82***	46	37.7	.425	.363	.730	4.6	**4.1**	1.2	**.5**	15.6
1995–96	Cleveland	**82**	15	28.9	.405	.353	.710	3.7	2.6	1.0	.4	10.6
1996–97	Miami	36	26	35.1	.406	.338	.678	4.5	3.2	1.5	.4	10.8
1997–98	Miami	72	22	26.8	.419	.376	.784	3.7	2.2	.9	.2	7.2
1998–99	Miami	48	48	33.8	.396	.335	.717	4.3	3.1	.8	.1	7.0
1999–00	Miami	69	69	33.4	.403	.362	.812	4.8	3.0	1.3	.2	7.3
2000–01	Miami	53	19	24.6	.336	.315	**.818**	3.1	1.7	1.0	.3	5.0
2001–02	Phoenix	65	1	18.2	.343	.336	.590	2.7	1.4	.7	.2	4.6
Career		955	454	31.6	.431	.358	.741	4.5	2.9	1.3	.4	11.4
All-Star		3	1	19.3	.429	.333	.750	5.0	2.7	.3	.7	10.7

=== Playoffs ===
Year	Team	GP	GS	MPG	FG%	3P%	FT%	RPG	APG	SPG	BPG	PPG
1989	Phoenix	12	0	29.3	.438	.286	.792	4.8	1.2	1.1	.3	14.3
1990	Phoenix	16	0	29.9	**.487**	.333	.785	5.1	2.1	1.3	.1	12.6
1991	Phoenix	4	0	27.5	.375	.364	.737	3.8	1.8	1.3	.3	10.5
1992	Phoenix	7	0	38.0	.432	.273	**.962**	6.3	2.9	1.4	.0	**18.6**
1993	Phoenix	**24**	**24**	**44.6**	.431	.394	.696	5.8	**3.7**	1.4	**1.2**	15.4
1994	Phoenix	10	10	41.0	.362	.339	.688	4.3	2.4	1.1	.4	12.3
1995	Phoenix	10	0	30.7	.370	.364	.706	3.1	1.7	1.4	.3	8.2
1996	Cleveland	3	0	30.3	.444	**.435**	.889	4.0	3.0	1.3	.7	16.7
1997	Miami	17	2	29.2	.393	.338	.679	4.2	2.5	1.2	.2	8.0
1998	Miami	2	2	31.0	.375	.333	.500	2.5	2.5	2.0	.5	4.5
1999	Miami	5	5	30.4	.192	.227	.714	5.8	1.2	1.0	.4	4.0
2000	Miami	10	10	37.2	.423	.400	.714	**7.0**	3.2	**2.1**	.1	9.0
2001	Miami	3	0	23.7	.313	.286	.500	3.3	1.7	1.0	.0	5.3
Career		123	53	34.5	.416	.353	.753	5.0	2.5	1.3	.4	11.7

== Post-NBA career ==
Majerle was inducted into the Phoenix Suns Ring of Honor on March 9, 2003. In 2006, he was inducted into the Michigan Sports Hall of Fame and into the Arizona Sports Hall of Fame in 2017. In 2003, Majerle made his broadcasting debut covering the 2003 NBA Playoffs for TNT and later became an analyst for ESPN. During the 2005 All-Star Weekend, he was a member of the Phoenix team that won the Shooting Stars Competition.

=== Coaching career ===
==== Phoenix Suns (2008–2013) ====
Majerle was the associate head coach for the Phoenix Suns from 2008 to 2013.

==== Grand Canyon University (2013–2020) ====
On March 15, 2013, it was announced that Majerle would coach for Grand Canyon University in their first season as a Division I team.

On December 23, 2015, Majerle led Grand Canyon to their first tournament victory as a Division I team when they won the 2015 Global Sports Classic championship.

He was fired on March 17, 2020, after his first losing season, with his seven years stint at Grand Canyon coming to an end. On May 19, 2020, Majerle filed a lawsuit against Grand Canyon University over the handling of its firing from the head coach position and pending salaries.

== Personal life ==
Majerle owns a restaurant called "Majerle's Sports Grill" in Phoenix.

He has four children with Tina Majerle (divorced 2006): Madison, McKenzie, Mia, and Max. Max also plays basketball and joined Central Michigan's basketball team in 2022.

Majerle married Devney Preuss in 2022.

== Head coaching record ==
Record table
Season	Team	Overall	Conference	Standing	Postseason
Grand Canyon Antelopes (Western Athletic Conference) (2013–2020)
2013–14	Grand Canyon	15–15	10–6	3rd	CIT First Round
2014–15	Grand Canyon	17–15	8–6	T–2nd	CIT First Round
2015–16	Grand Canyon	27–7	11–3	T–2nd	CIT Quarterfinal
2016–17	Grand Canyon	22–9	11–3	T–2nd	
2017–18	Grand Canyon	22–12	9–5	3rd	CBI First Round
2018–19	Grand Canyon	20–14	10–6	3rd	CBI First Round
2019–20	Grand Canyon	13–17	8–8	T–5th	
Grand Canyon:		136–89 (.604)	67–36 (.650)		
Total:		136–89 (.604)			

== Filmography ==
Year	Title	Role	Notes	Ref
2012	The Other Dream Team	Himself	Documentary about the Lithuania men's national basketball team at the 1992 Summer Olympics.	

== See also ==
- List of National Basketball Association career 3-point scoring leaders
- List of National Basketball Association career playoff 3-point scoring leaders
- List of National Basketball Association retired numbers
