= 2013–14 Phoenix Suns season =

Professional basketball season

- Head coach: Jeff Hornacek
- General manager: Ryan McDonough
- Owners: Robert Sarver
- Arena: US Airways Center

Results
- Record: 48–34 (.585)
- Place: Division: 3rd (Pacific); Conference: 9th (Western)
- Playoff finish: Did not qualify
- Stats at Basketball Reference

Local media
- Television: Fox Sports Arizona
- Radio: KTAR

The 2013–14 Phoenix Suns season was the Phoenix Suns' 46th season in the NBA. This season marked the first time that purple was not a primary color for the team (although it was still involved with their system). It was also the first time since the beginning of the 1987–88 NBA season that the Suns ended up drafting in the top 5 of a draft. In addition, it was the first time since the beginning of the 2000–01 NBA season that the Suns made complete changes in not only their logos, but also their jerseys. When the Suns began the regular season, Goran Dragić, P. J. Tucker, Markieff Morris, and his twin brother Marcus Morris were the only players returning from playing with last season's team (while Channing Frye was still on last season's team, he didn't play any games due to a life-threatening heart ailment he had at the time).

The Phoenix Suns, despite their winning record, failed to make the playoffs. They tied the 2007–08 Golden State Warriors' record for highest winning percentage for a non-playoff team since the NBA switched to the 8 team format. The all-time record is held by the 1971–72 Phoenix Suns (49–33), which was during the four-team playoff era. This drew criticism from many fans regarding the conference system. The Atlanta Hawks, a sub-.500 team in the Eastern Conference, managed to make the playoffs. The Suns would have been tied for the 3 seed in the Eastern Conference that year.

== Key dates ==
- April 22, 2013: The Phoenix Suns fired general manager Lance Blanks.
- May 7, 2013: The Suns hired the Boston Celtics' assistant general manager Ryan McDonough as their new general manager.
- May 21, 2013: The NBA Draft Lottery took place.
- May 26, 2013: The Suns did not renew interim head coach Lindsey Hunter's contract; former Suns player Jeff Hornacek became Hunter's replacement as the official head coach.
- June 19, 2013: The Suns' newest logos were leaked out to the Internet.
- June 25, 2013: Former Boston Celtics affiliates Jerry Sichting and Mike Longabardi, as well as former Suns players Kenny Gattison and Mark West, were officially named assistant head coaches to the new coaching staff; both Noel Gillespie and Dan Panaggio were fired from their assistant coaching positions.
- June 26, 2013: The Suns officially revealed their newest logos and colors to start the new season.
- June 27, 2013: The 2013 NBA draft took place at Barclays Center in Brooklyn; Phoenix traded their 30th draft pick (Nemanja Nedović) to the Golden State Warriors for the Oklahoma City Thunder's 29th pick (Archie Goodwin) and Malcolm Lee (both of whom were added by the Warriors in earlier trades) to add to their own selections of Alex Len at pick number 5 and Alex Oriakhi at number 57.
- June 29, 2013: The Phoenix Suns officially waived center Hamed Haddadi from the team. The Suns saved $1.2 million since Haddadi was initially owed $1.4 million had he stayed for the season.
- July 1, 2013: The NBA free agency period began.
- July 2, 2013: The Suns agreed to trade shooting guard-small forward Jared Dudley to the Los Angeles Clippers and a 2014 second-round pick from either the Sacramento Kings or the Toronto Raptors (which was given to the team last season in a trade involving Sebastian Telfair) to the Milwaukee Bucks for point guard Eric Bledsoe and small forward Caron Butler, both of whom last played for the Clippers.
- July 10, 2013: Teams could officially sign, trade, and amnesty players to their liking.
- July 27, 2013: The Suns traded power forward Luis Scola to the Indiana Pacers in exchange for Gerald Green, Miles Plumlee, and a top 14-protected 2014 first-round draft pick.
- August 6, 2013: The NBA released the official 2013–14 league schedules.
- August 15, 2013: The team revealed their newest uniforms, nicknamed the "Speed of Light" uniforms. The new uniforms were worn by rookies Alex Len and Archie Goodwin, new player(s) Eric Bledsoe and Caron Butler, and returning Suns player P. J. Tucker.
- August 29, 2013: The Suns traded small forward Caron Butler to his hometown team (the Milwaukee Bucks) in exchange for Ukrainian center Viacheslav Kravtsov and American point guard Ish Smith; Diante Garrett officially left to play for the Oklahoma City Thunder; Alex Len officially signed with the Suns.
- August 30, 2013: Channing Frye announced on Instagram that he was officially 100% healthy to play for the Suns once again.
- September 3, 2013: Michael Beasley had his contract bought out by the team, meaning he was officially waived by the Suns; buying out his contract resulted in the Suns saving close to over $3,000,000 through the next four years.
- September 30, 2013: The Suns confirmed that Channing Frye was officially 100% healthy for training with the team a day before training camp at Northern Arizona University in Flagstaff, Arizona begins.
- October 25, 2013: Center Marcin Gortat, shooting guards Shannon Brown & Malcolm Lee, and second-year point guard Kendall Marshall (who the Suns drafted last year) were traded to the Washington Wizards for forward-center Emeka Okafor and their Top 12 protected 2014 first-round draft pick; the Suns also cut shooting guard James Nunnally from their training camp roster.
- October 30, 2013: The regular season for the Suns begins.
- November 11, 2013: Power forward Markieff Morris ends up winning the Western Conference's Player of the Week award from November 4–November 10, 2013 for his improved production off the bench, which included setting a record that only Dwight Howard and former Suns player Charles Barkley had reached before in their careers.
- January 2, 2014: Coach Jeff Hornacek wins the Coach of the Month award for December 2013 due to the team's performance during that month. He also becomes the third former NBA player (with Larry Bird and Larry Drew being the first two) to win both a Player of the Month and Coach of the Month award in their professional careers, as well as the first to win both awards with the same team.
- January 8, 2014: Former Suns fan favorite Leandro Barbosa signs a 10-day contract to play for the Phoenix Suns again.
- January 9, 2014: Eric Bledsoe has surgery to partially remove a torn meniscus in his right knee.
- January 18, 2014: Leandro Barbosa would sign another 10-day contract to continue playing for the Suns.
- January 26, 2014: The Suns would get their 25th win off of a 99–90 road victory over the Cleveland Cavaliers. This would tie the total number of wins the team had throughout the entirety of their last season they played.
- January 27, 2014: The Suns surpassed their total number of wins from last season by winning 124–113 against the Philadelphia 76ers on the road.
- February 3, 2014: Guard Goran Dragić ends up winning the Western Conference's Player of the Week award from January 27–February 2, 2014 for averaging 26.8 points on 63.9% shooting and 69.2% three-point shooting, 6 assists, and 4 rebounds while averaging 29.2 minutes per game in all four victories during that week, with two full games having Goran recovering from an elbow injury their road game against the Milwaukee Bucks.
- February 6, 2014: Goran Dragić ends up being confirmed as one of 8 possible candidates for the newly revamped Taco Bell Skills Challenge.
- February 7, 2014: Center Miles Plumlee is announced to end up playing for former Phoenix Suns player Grant Hill's team in the BBVA Rising Stars Challenge after initial rookie center candidate Pero Antić of the Atlanta Hawks was injured from the game.
- February 14, 2014: The 2014 NBA All-Star Weekend break begins.
- February 21, 2014: The Suns would get their 33rd victory against the San Antonio Spurs in a blowout 106–85 game. This ties the Suns' win total from the lockout shortened 2011–12 NBA season, which was also the last season the Suns would have Steve Nash playing for the team. They'd also get their first official sold–out game at home since around 2012 in the process, as well as beat the San Antonio Spurs by over 20 points for the first time since 1999.
- February 28, 2014: The Suns surpassed their total number of wins from Steve Nash's last season with the team by winning 116–104 against the New Orleans Pelicans at home. Goran Dragić would also score a career high 40 points against the team in the process.
- March 1, 2014: Center Viacheslav Kravtsov is waived from the team in order for the Suns to sign Chinese Basketball Association All-Star power forward Shavlik Randolph for the rest of the season.
- March 4, 2014: Leandro Barbosa fractures his right hand in a loss to the Los Angeles Clippers at home. As a result, he'd end up missing the rest of the regular season.
- March 12, 2014: Eric Bledsoe plays his first game of the regular season since December 30, 2013.
- March 21, 2014: The Suns win their 40th game against the Detroit Pistons in a close 98–92 victory at home. This ties the Suns' win total from the 2010–11 NBA season, which was the first season that former Suns general manager Lance Blanks and current Suns President of Basketball Operations Lon Babby saw over the team's moves.
- March 23, 2014: The Suns win their 41st game against the Minnesota Timberwolves in a close 127–120 victory on the road, which included a 22-point comeback throughout the game. This not only gives general manager Ryan McDonough more victories in his first year as general manager of the Suns than former general manager Lance Blanks, but it also gives the Suns their first guaranteed .500+ record since the 2011–12 NBA season (or the 2009–10 NBA season in terms of full seasons).
- March 24, 2014: The Suns win their 42nd game against the Atlanta Hawks in a 102–95 victory on the road. As a result, the Suns are now guaranteed to finish off their season with a record above 0.500 for the first time since the 2009–10 NBA season.
- April 23, 2014: Goran Dragić wins the Most Improved Player of the Year Award due to his performance with the Suns throughout this season.
- May 9, 2014: The Suns officially retained exclusive rights to the Bakersfield Jam under a hybrid affiliation.
- May 18, 2014: Mike Elliott was named the NBA's Strength & Conditioning Coach of the Year.
- May 22, 2014: Goran Dragić is honored with Slovenia's own "Javbolko Navdiha" (Apple of Inspiration) award after the performances he had throughout the season with not just the Suns, but also with the Slovenian national basketball team during the 2013 Eurobasket Tournament.
- June 4, 2014: Goran Dragić became a member of the All-NBA Third Team due to his overall performance throughout the season. Dragić also became the fourth overall player to make an All-NBA team after winning the Most Improved Player of the Year Award as well.

== Offseason ==
=== Draft picks ===
Round	Pick	Player	Position	Nationality	College
1	5	Olexsiy "Alex" Len	Center	Ukraine	Maryland
1	29	Archie Goodwin	Shooting guard	United States	Kentucky
2	57	Alex Oriakhi	Power forward	United States	Missouri

The Suns had two first-round picks and one second-round pick this year. The first pick they had was their own pick that could have gone at number 1 at best or 7 at worst, with the best odds going for the pick to be at number 5. On the day of the NBA draft lottery, it was revealed that they would get pick number 5 in the first round. Their own second-round pick was traded to the Houston Rockets for Marcus Morris, the twin brother of Suns power forward Markieff Morris. Both their additional first and second-round picks came from different teams due to last season's sign and trade deal with the Los Angeles Lakers that sent point guard Steve Nash to the Lakers in exchange for four different draft picks. The first-round pick (which ended up being the 30th pick) came from the Miami Heat due to an earlier trade with the Cleveland Cavaliers involving LeBron James, while the second-round pick came from the Denver Nuggets due to a 2011 draft day trade that traded the Lakers' rights to Chukwudiebere Maduabum to Denver in exchange for their 2013 second-round pick.

With the fifth pick, the Suns selected the Ukrainian-born center Olexsiy "Alex" Len, who was a sophomore from the University of Maryland. Len averaged 11.9 points, 7.8 rebounds, and 2.1 blocks per game in his last season with the Terrapins. The Suns then traded the 30th pick, which became the Serbian-born guard Nemanja Nedović from the Lietuvos Rytas Vilnius, to the Golden State Warriors in exchange for shooting guard Malcolm Lee and pick 29 that was originally from the Oklahoma City Thunder, which was Archie Goodwin from the University of Kentucky. Goodwin averaged 14.1 points, 4.6 rebounds, 2.7 assists, 1.1 steals, and 0.5 blocks per game in his only season with Kentucky. Finally, with their 57th pick, the Suns selected Alex Oriakhi, who used to play for the University of Connecticut until his senior season due to the university's NCAA Tournament ineligibility; he spent his senior season with the University of Missouri. In addition to winning an NCAA championship during his sophomore season with Connecticut, in his only season with Missouri, he scored 11.2 points, grabbed 8.4 rebounds, and recorded 1.6 blocks per game in 25.8 minutes of play for 34 games.

=== Free agency ===
Veteran player Jermaine O'Neal, as well as Wesley Johnson and rookie guard Diante Garrett were unrestricted free agents as of the end of the 2012–13 NBA season. On June 29, 2013, the Suns released Hamed Haddadi's contract in order to let him become an unrestricted free agent as well. Contrary to previous seasons, the Suns decided to not focus so much on the free agency market this year. On July 15, 2013, Wesley Johnson signed a veteran's minimum contract for one year with the Los Angeles Lakers. On July 23, 2013, O'Neal agreed to a one-year deal to play for the Golden State Warriors. Garrett officially announced on Twitter that he would be playing for the Oklahoma City Thunder on August 29, 2013, before playing officially for the Utah Jazz on November 13, 2013. Haddadi ended up going back to his home in Iran to play for Foolad Mahan Isfahan on September 12, 2013, during the 2013 FIBA Asia Champions Cup, only to then play for the Sichuan Blue Whales in China. An additional player the Suns decided to sign for this season was former Temple shooting guard Dionte Christmas, who had last played with Montepaschi Siena in Italy's Lega Basket Serie A, where he and the team not only won the league's championship, but also participated in the 2012–13 Euroleague; Christmas had also performed with the team's 2013 Summer League Las Vegas Tournament squad, where he averaged 10.1 points, 2.7 rebounds, and 2.0 assists during the team's 6–1 streak. The Suns also had former UC Santa Barbara combo guard James Nunnally, who last played with the Miami Heat in the 2013 Las Vegas Summer League Tournament, during the Suns' training camp and preseason session.

One of the team's biggest signings from last season, Michael Beasley, was bought out of his contract on September 3, 2013. His buyout of the team's contract had the team paying Beasley only $4.66 million for this season as opposed to the $6 million he was initially owed (which saved the team $1.34 million in salary), and then has the team stretching his original guaranteed salary of $3,000,000 for one year to $2,300,000 for three straight seasons, with each year paying him only $766,666 instead of the entire guarantee he was owed. Because of Beasley being bought out of his contract, he was considered an unrestricted free agent by the NBA during his time of being waived. Beasley would end up signing with the team that first drafted him as the #2 pick in the 2008 NBA draft, the two-time champion Miami Heat on September 11, 2013. In addition to being signed by the Heat before the start of the regular season, some of the $4,660,000 that the Suns owed him now gets paid by the Heat instead.

On January 5, 2014, the Suns decided to bring back former fan favorite player Leandro Barbosa to a 10-day contract. However, his contract would not officially be signed until January 8 due to not only finding out whether Barbosa would be healthy enough to participate, but would also have to wait for FIBA to approve his move from Brazil to the NBA. The move was prompted due to star point guard Eric Bledsoe being out longer than the team had initially expected due to a knee injury that had later on turned into a torn meniscus that he got against his former team on December 28, 2013. The last NBA team Barbosa played for was with the Boston Celtics before an ACL tear led him to being traded to the Washington Wizards; he had then played for the Esporte Clube Pinheiros in Brazil as a means of playing while healing up from his past injury. He has been able to play under the shooting guard position with Ish Smith playing most of the back-up point guard duties while Eric Bledsoe remains injured. Barbosa would end up signing a second 10-day contract immediately after the first one ended on January 18, 2014, before being confirmed by Lon Babby and the staff that Barbosa would get $650,359 and remain on the team for the rest of the season on January 27, 2014.

During the post-trade deadline period of free agent signings, the Suns decided to waive back-up center Viacheslav Kravtsov out of the team on March 1, 2014. In exchange for Kravtsov's leave of absence on Phoenix, the Suns decided to sign former Boston Celtics and CBA's Foshan Dralions all-star power forward Shavlik Randolph on the same day. Randolph was signed to the Suns in order to have not only tried to help the team win enough games to make it to the playoffs for the first time in over three seasons, but to have also helped the team out in the postseason had the team actually made it to the 2014 NBA Playoffs.

=== Trades ===
On June 27, the Suns agreed to trade their 30th draft pick (which became Nemanja Nedović) to the Golden State Warriors in exchange for the rights to Malcolm Lee (who they first acquired from the Minnesota Timberwolves) and the 29th pick (which became Archie Goodwin) that the Warriors first acquired from the Oklahoma City Thunder. On July 2, the Suns participated in a three-team trade that had the Suns send Jared Dudley to the Los Angeles Clippers and a 2014 second-round pick they acquired from the Toronto Raptors last season to the Milwaukee Bucks in exchange for Eric Bledsoe and Caron Butler, both of whom last played for the L.A. Clippers. On July 27, the Suns agreed to trade Luis Scola (who the team got from amnesty bids last season) to the Indiana Pacers in exchange for Gerald Green, Miles Plumlee, and a 2014 lottery protected first-round draft pick. The Suns would later trade Butler to his hometown team (the Milwaukee Bucks) on August 29, 2013, in exchange for Ukrainian power forward/center Viacheslav Kravtsov and American point guard Ish Smith. Finally, in the team's last trade before the regular season began, the Suns traded their center Marcin Gortat, alongside guards Shannon Brown, Malcolm Lee, and last year's lottery pick (Kendall Marshall) to the Washington Wizards in exchange for power forward Emeka Okafor and their 2014 Top 12 protected first-round draft pick on October 25, 2013. Of the players the Suns traded to Washington, only Gortat would end up playing for the Wizards before the regular season began as Marshall, Brown, and Lee were all waived by the Wizards three days later. In addition, back-up center Viacheslav Kravtsov would end up being waived from the Suns on March 1, 2014.

=== Coaching changes ===
Interim head coach Lindsey Hunter was officially granted a chance to be interviewed by the Detroit Pistons to be their head coach on April 24, 2013, which led to indications that the Suns were looking for a new head coach. On May 9, 2013, the Suns announced that along with Hunter, assistant coaches Brian Shaw of the Indiana Pacers, Kelvin Sampson of the Houston Rockets, Mike Budenholzer of the San Antonio Spurs, and Quin Snyder from PBC CSKA Moscow were considered options to be the team's head coach for this season. Five days later, the Suns announced that their search would expand to also include assistant head coaches Michael Malone of the Golden State Warriors, David Fizdale of the Miami Heat, and Jeff Hornacek of the Utah Jazz, with the latter assistant also being a Suns fan favorite. In addition to the aforementioned announced candidates, the Suns also announced interest in looking at Los Angeles Lakers assistant coach Steve Clifford, Houston Rockets assistant coach J.B. Bickerstaff, Villanova University head coach Jay Wright, Butler University head coach Brad Stevens, and Iowa State University head coach Fred Hoiberg. On May 26, 2013, the Suns announced that former Suns player Jeff Hornacek was the new head coach, to replace interim head coach Lindsey Hunter, who later signed with the Golden State Warriors in September 2013 as an assistant head coach. Hornacek got a three-year contract with an optional fourth year.

In addition to Hunter's departure as the head coach, assistant head coach Igor Kokoškov departed from the Suns to be an assistant head coach for the Cleveland Cavaliers on May 29, 2013. On June 12, it was announced that Hall of Famer Ralph Sampson would also not be an assistant coach with the Suns in 2013–14. On June 25, 2013, the Suns let go of remaining assistant coaches Noel Gillespie and Dan Panaggio. On that same day, Hornacek announced his four assistant coaches for the 2013–14 season: former Boston Celtics affiliates Jerry Sichting and Mike Longabardi, and former Suns teammates Kenny Gattison and Mark West. Jerry Sichting was a champion player for the Boston Celtics during the 1985–86 NBA season, and he was more recently an assistant head coach for the Washington Wizards last season. Mike Longabardi was an assistant head coach for the Celtics' last six seasons, which included their 2007–08 NBA champion team, and was also their defensive coordinator in his last two seasons with the Celtics. Kenny Gattison was a former 3rd round selection by the Suns in the 1986 NBA draft that also was an assistant head coach for Larry Drew during his head coaching tenure with the Atlanta Hawks. Mark West was a player for the Phoenix Suns from 1988 to 1994 and was on their 1999–2000 team before accepting a front office gig for the team afterwards until this season. Former Suns assistant head coach and Phoenix Mercury head coach Corey Gaines would also end up taking on the role of being a player developmental coach that Hunter had formerly taken the role of last season.

=== Front office changes ===
On April 22, 2013, the Phoenix Suns fired general manager Lance Blanks due to his lackluster performance in his position over the last three years. Their search for the newest general manager included former Indiana Pacers general manager David Morway, former Los Angeles Lakers assistant general manager Ronnie Lester, former New York Knicks executive Mark Warkentien, assistant general managers Jeff Weltman of the Milwaukee Bucks (a finalist for general manager back in 2010), Ryan McDonough of the Boston Celtics, Wes Wilcox of the Atlanta Hawks, and Troy Weaver of the Oklahoma City Thunder, with Tony Ronzone, Eddie Johnson, David Griffin, Gersson Rosas, and Sam Hinkie considered as possible candidates. Other candidates that had garnered interest in the job included former Bulls and Lakers head coach Phil Jackson, as well as former Phoenix Suns players Grant Hill and Charles Barkley.

On May 1, 2013, it was revealed that the four finalists for the job were Boston Celtics assistant general manager Ryan McDonough, Milwaukee Bucks assistant general manager Jeff Weltman, former Indiana Pacers general manager David Morway, and former Utah Jazz and New York Knicks executive/general manager and current San Antonio Spurs assistant general manager Scott Layden. Four days later, the finalists were narrowed down to either Jeff Weltman or Ryan McDonough being the newest general manager. Finally, on May 7, 2013, the Phoenix Suns announced that Boston's assistant general manager Ryan McDonough would be the Suns' newest general manager for the next four years. Ronnie Lester, along with the Washington Wizards' director of player personnel Pat Connelly, would later be hired by McDonough to be talent evaluators for the Suns. The Suns also hired Emilio Kovačić as an international scouting consultant for the Suns and Trevor Bukstein as an assistant general manager.

== Roster ==
2013–14 Phoenix Suns roster
Players

Pos.	No.	Player	Height	Weight	DOB	From
SG	10	Leandro Barbosa	6 ft 3 in (1.91 m)	194 lb (88 kg)	1982–11–28	Brazil
PG	2	Eric Bledsoe	6 ft 1 in (1.85 m)	195 lb (88 kg)	1989–12–09	Kentucky
SG	25	Dionte Christmas	6 ft 5 in (1.96 m)	205 lb (93 kg)	1986–09–15	Temple
PG	1	Goran Dragić	6 ft 3 in (1.91 m)	190 lb (86 kg)	1986–05–06	Slovenia
PF	8	Channing Frye	6 ft 11 in (2.11 m)	245 lb (111 kg)	1983–05–17	Arizona
SG	20	Archie Goodwin	6 ft 5 in (1.96 m)	198 lb (90 kg)	1994–08–17	Kentucky
SG	14	Gerald Green	6 ft 8 in (2.03 m)	210 lb (95 kg)	1986–01–26	Gulf Shores Academy (TX)
C	21	Alex Len	7 ft 1 in (2.16 m)	255 lb (116 kg)	1993–06–16	Maryland
SF	15	Marcus Morris	6 ft 10 in (2.08 m)	235 lb (107 kg)	1989–09–02	Kansas
PF	11	Markieff Morris	6 ft 10 in (2.08 m)	245 lb (111 kg)	1989–09–02	Kansas
C	50	Emeka Okafor	6 ft 10 in (2.08 m)	255 lb (116 kg)	1982–09–28	Connecticut
C	22	Miles Plumlee	6 ft 11 in (2.11 m)	255 lb (116 kg)	1988–09–01	Duke
PF	43	Shavlik Randolph	6 ft 10 in (2.08 m)	236 lb (107 kg)	1983–11–24	Duke
PG	3	Ish Smith	6 ft 0 in (1.83 m)	175 lb (79 kg)	1988–07–05	Wake Forest
SF	17	P. J. Tucker	6 ft 6 in (1.98 m)	224 lb (102 kg)	1985–05–05	Texas

Coaches
Head coach
- Jeff Hornacek (Iowa State)
Assistant(s)
- Jerry Sichting (Purdue)
- Mike Longabardi (Frostburg State)
- Kenny Gattison (Old Dominion)
- Mark West (Old Dominion)
- Corey Gaines (Loyola Marymount)

Legend
- (DP) Unsigned draft pick
- (FA) Free agent
- (S) Suspended
- (DL) On assignment to D-League affiliate
- Injured

Roster

=== Salaries ===
Player	2013–14 Salary
Emeka Okafor	$14,544,687
Goran Dragić	$7,500,000
Channing Frye	$6,400,000
Gerald Green	$3,500,000
Olexsiy "Alex" Len	$3,492,720
Eric Bledsoe	$2,626,473
Markieff Morris	$2,207,040
Marcus Morris	$2,096,760
Viacheslav Kravtsov	$1,500,000
Miles Plumlee	$1,121,520
Archie Goodwin	$1,064,400
Ish Smith	$985,000
P. J. Tucker	$884,293
Leandro Barbosa	$650,359
Dionte Christmas	$490,180
Shavlik Randolph	$306,036
TOTAL	$48,413,073

Because Hamed Haddadi was waived by the Suns before July 1, he was only owed $200,000 by the team instead of the full $1,400,000 that he would have gotten had he stayed with the team. In addition, while Josh Childress is still owed $7,182,500 due to them amnestying his contract last season, his salary does not affect the Suns' overall salary cap to their season this year. Also, with the Michael Beasley buyout the Suns did on September 3, 2013, they now owe Beasley $4,660,000 for this season as opposed to giving him the full $6,000,000 had he stayed with the team during the regular season. Not only that, but some of the money that the Suns owed Beasley this season would be offset by the Miami Heat due to their re-signing of him for a second stint. To add to the post-season player movements, the Suns' waiving of back-up center Viacheslav Kravtsov has his contract of $1,500,000 being retained as a part of a pay-off for the rest of the season as of March 1, 2014, in order to add room to using power forward Shavlik Randolph and his $306,036 contract.

== Pre-season ==
2013 pre-season game log
Total: 5–2 (Home: 2–1; Road: 3–1)
Pre-season: 5–2 (home: 2–1; road: 3–1)

Game	Date	Team	Score	High points	High rebounds	High assists	Location Attendance	Record
1	October 7	Maccabi Haifa	W 130–89	Eric Bledsoe (22)	Olexsiy "Alex" Len (6)	Goran Dragić (5)	US Airways Center; 7,548	1–0
2	October 9	@ Portland	W 104–98	Goran Dragić (19)	Marcus Morris (7)	Eric Bledsoe (9)	Moda Center; 12,653	2–0
3	October 13	@ San Antonio	W 106–99	Gerald Green (19)	Olexsiy "Alex" Len (9)	Marcin Gortat (3)	AT&T Center; 16,203	3–0
4	October 15	L.A. Clippers	L 96–102	Goran Dragić (20)	P. J. Tucker (6)	Eric Bledsoe (7)	US Airways Center; 11,516	3–1
5	October 17	@ Sacramento	L 90–107	Markieff Morris (15)	Markieff Morris (7)	Eric Bledsoe (5)	Sleep Train Arena; 11,223	3–2
6	October 22	Oklahoma City	W 88–76	Eric Bledsoe, Gerald Green (15)	Channing Frye (9)	Eric Bledsoe (7)	US Airways Center; 11,526	4–2
7	October 23	@ Denver	W 98–79	Eric Bledsoe (21)	Marcin Gortat (13)	Goran Dragić (8)	Pepsi Center; 14,652	5–2

2013–14 season schedule

== Regular season ==
=== Season standings ===
Pacific Division	W	L	PCT	GB	Home	Road	Div	GP
y-Los Angeles Clippers	57	25	.695	–	34‍–‍7	23‍–‍18	12–4	82
x-Golden State Warriors	51	31	.622	6.0	27‍–‍14	24‍–‍17	11–5	82
Phoenix Suns	48	34	.585	9.0	26‍–‍15	22‍–‍19	8–8	82
Sacramento Kings	28	54	.341	29.0	17‍–‍24	11‍–‍30	3–13	82
Los Angeles Lakers	27	55	.329	30.0	14‍–‍27	13‍–‍28	6–10	82

Western Conference
#	Team	W	L	PCT	GB	GP
1	z-San Antonio Spurs *	62	20	.756	–	82
2	y-Oklahoma City Thunder *	59	23	.720	3.0	82
3	y-Los Angeles Clippers *	57	25	.695	5.0	82
4	x-Houston Rockets	54	28	.659	8.0	82
5	x-Portland Trail Blazers	54	28	.659	8.0	82
6	x-Golden State Warriors	51	31	.622	11.0	82
7	x-Memphis Grizzlies	50	32	.610	12.0	82
8	x-Dallas Mavericks	49	33	.598	13.0	82
9	Phoenix Suns	48	34	.585	14.0	82
10	Minnesota Timberwolves	40	42	.488	22.0	82
11	Denver Nuggets	36	46	.439	26.0	82
12	New Orleans Pelicans	34	48	.415	28.0	82
13	Sacramento Kings	28	54	.341	34.0	82
14	Los Angeles Lakers	27	55	.329	35.0	82
15	Utah Jazz	25	57	.305	37.0	82

=== Game log ===
2013–14 game log
Total: 48–34 (Home: 26–15; Road: 22–19)
October: 1–0 (home: 1–0; road: 0–0)

Game	Date	Team	Score	High points	High rebounds	High assists	Location Attendance	Record
1	October 30	Portland	W 104–91	Goran Dragić (26)	Miles Plumlee (15)	Goran Dragić (9)	US Airways Center; 17,208	1–0

November : 8–8 (home: 4–3; road: 4–5)

Game	Date	Team	Score	High points	High rebounds	High assists	Location Attendance	Record
2	November 1	Utah	W 87–84	Eric Bledsoe (18)	Miles Plumlee (13)	Eric Bledsoe (6)	US Airways Center; 14,662	2–0
3	November 3	@ Oklahoma City	L 96–103	Eric Bledsoe (26)	Gerald Green (8)	Eric Bledsoe (14)	Chesapeake Energy Arena; 18,203	2–1
4	November 5	@ New Orleans	W 104–98	Eric Bledsoe (25)	Marcus Morris (9)	Ish Smith (8)	New Orleans Arena; 13,404	3–1
5	November 6	@ San Antonio	L 96–99	Markieff Morris (23)	Markieff Morris (12)	Eric Bledsoe (5)	AT&T Center; 17,870	3–2
6	November 8	Denver	W 114–103	Markieff Morris (28)	Miles Plumlee (11)	Eric Bledsoe (9)	US Airways Center; 15,145	4–2
7	November 10	New Orleans	W 101–94	Eric Bledsoe (24)	Miles Plumlee (12)	Eric Bledsoe (6)	US Airways Center; 13,154	5–2
8	November 13	@ Portland	L 89–90	Eric Bledsoe (23)	Miles Plumlee (10)	Eric Bledsoe (6)	Moda Center; 19,537	5–3
9	November 15	Brooklyn	L 98–100 (OT)	Goran Dragić (19)	Marcus Morris (9)	Goran Dragić (10)	US Airways Center; 15,984	5–4
10	November 19	@ Sacramento	L 104–107	Gerald Green (23)	Channing Frye (9)	Goran Dragić (8)	Sleep Train Arena; 14,626	5–5
11	November 20	Sacramento	L 106–113	Goran Dragić (31)	Miles Plumlee (7)	Goran Dragić (5)	US Airways Center; 12,705	5–6
12	November 22	@ Charlotte	W 98–91	Channing Frye (20)	Miles Plumlee (11)	Goran Dragić (8)	Time Warner Cable Arena; 14,916	6–6
13	November 24	@ Orlando	W 104–96	Goran Dragić (23)	Gerald Green (8)	Goran Dragić (13)	Amway Center; 15,785	7–6
14	November 25	@ Miami	L 92–107	Channing Frye (16)	Markieff Morris (9)	Goran Dragić (9)	American Airlines Arena; 19,758	7–7
15	November 27	Portland	W 120–106	Goran Dragić (31)	Miles Plumlee (10)	Goran Dragić (10)	US Airways Center; 12,731	8–7
16	November 29	@ Utah	W 112–101	Markieff Morris (23)	Miles Plumlee (10)	Goran Dragić (9)	EnergySolutions Arena; 18,435	9–7
17	November 30	Utah	L 104–112	Goran Dragić (24)	Miles Plumlee, Markieff Morris (7)	Goran Dragić (9)	US Airways Center; 12,957	9–8

December : 10–3 (home: 6–1; road: 4–2)

Game	Date	Team	Score	High points	High rebounds	High assists	Location Attendance	Record
18	December 3	@ Memphis	L 91–110	Marcus Morris (18)	Miles Plumlee, Markieff Morris (8)	Eric Bledsoe, Goran Dragić (5)	FedExForum; 15,069	9–9
19	December 4	@ Houston	W 97–88	Eric Bledsoe (20)	Miles Plumlee (9)	Eric Bledsoe (7)	Toyota Center; 18,151	10–9
20	December 6	Toronto	W 106–97	Markieff Morris (25)	P. J. Tucker (13)	Eric Bledsoe (7)	US Airways Center; 12,672	11–9
21	December 10	@ L.A. Lakers	W 114–108	Goran Dragić (31)	P. J. Tucker (11)	Eric Bledsoe (9)	Staples Center; 18,997	12–9
22	December 13	Sacramento	W 116–107	Goran Dragić (29)	Miles Plumlee, P. J. Tucker (9)	Eric Bledsoe (8)	US Airways Center; 14,128	13–9
23	December 15	Golden State	W 106–102	Eric Bledsoe (24)	Miles Plumlee (10)	Eric Bledsoe (8)	US Airways Center; 14,393	14–9
24	December 18	San Antonio	L 101–108	Channing Frye (22)	Miles Plumlee (13)	Eric Bledsoe (7)	US Airways Center; 13,661	14–10
25	December 20	@ Denver	W 103–99	Markieff Morris (25)	Miles Plumlee (12)	Goran Dragić (6)	Pepsi Center; 15,974	15–10
26	December 21	Dallas	W 123–108	Eric Bledsoe (25)	Channing Frye, Miles Plumlee (8)	Eric Bledsoe (6)	US Airways Center; 15,241	16–10
27	December 23	L.A. Lakers	W 117–90	Gerald Green (22)	Miles Plumlee (20)	Eric Bledsoe, Goran Dragić (7)	US Airways Center; 14,814	17–10
28	December 27	@ Golden State	L 86–115	P. J. Tucker (11)	P. J. Tucker (12)	Goran Dragić (3)	Oracle Arena; 19,596	17–11
29	December 28	Philadelphia	W 115–101	Miles Plumlee (22)	Miles Plumlee (13)	Goran Dragić (5)	US Airways Center; 15,623	18–11
30	December 30	@ L.A. Clippers	W 107–88	Goran Dragić (26)	Markieff Morris (12)	Goran Dragić (8)	Staples Center; 19,278	19–11

January : 9–7 (home: 4–3; road: 5–4)

Game	Date	Team	Score	High points	High rebounds	High assists	Location Attendance	Record
31	January 2	Memphis	L 91–99	Goran Dragić (33)	Miles Plumlee (12)	Goran Dragić (7)	US Airways Center; 14,844	19–12
32	January 4	Milwaukee	W 116–100	Gerald Green (25)	Miles Plumlee (9)	Ish Smith (8)	US Airways Center; 14,344	20–12
33	January 7	@ Chicago	L 87–92	Goran Dragić (21)	Channing Frye, Miles Plumlee (7)	Ish Smith (3)	United Center; 21,181	20–13
34	January 8	@ Minnesota	W 104–103	Goran Dragić (26)	P. J. Tucker (10)	Goran Dragić (9)	Target Center; 12,202	21–13
35	January 10	@ Memphis	L 99–104	Goran Dragić (21)	Miles Plumlee (11)	Goran Dragić (8)	FedExForum; 17,049	21–14
36	January 11	@ Detroit	L 108–110	Channing Frye (21)	P. J. Tucker (11)	Goran Dragić (8)	Palace of Auburn Hills; 15,224	21–15
37	January 13	@ New York	L 96–98 (OT)	Goran Dragić (28)	Miles Plumlee (11)	Goran Dragić (4)	Madison Square Garden; 19,812	21–16
38	January 15	L.A. Lakers	W 121–114	Gerald Green (28)	Goran Dragić (10)	Goran Dragić (7)	US Airways Center; 16,022	22–16
39	January 17	Dallas	L 107–110	Goran Dragić (28)	Markieff Morris (12)	Goran Dragić (7)	US Airways Center; 16,486	22–17
40	January 19	Denver	W 117–103	Channing Frye (30)	P. J. Tucker (9)	Goran Dragić (6)	US Airways Center; 16,211	23–17
41	January 22	Indiana	W 124–100	Gerald Green (23)	Miles Plumlee (7)	Goran Dragić (3)	US Airways Center; 16,465	24–17
42	January 24	Washington	L 95–101	Goran Dragić (19)	Miles Plumlee (6)	Goran Dragić (11)	US Airways Center; 16,198	24–18
43	January 26	@ Cleveland	W 99–90	Markieff Morris (27)	Markieff Morris (15)	Goran Dragić (7)	Quicken Loans Arena; 15,872	25–18
44	January 27	@ Philadelphia	W 124–113	Gerald Green (30)	Miles Plumlee (13)	Goran Dragić (7)	Wells Fargo Center; 10,793	26–18
45	January 29	@ Milwaukee	W 126–117	Goran Dragić (30)	Olexsiy "Alex" Len (10)	Goran Dragić, Ish Smith (6)	BMO Harris Bradley Center; 11,175	27–18
46	January 30	@ Indiana	W 102–94	Goran Dragić (28)	Channing Frye (8)	Goran Dragić (7)	Bankers Life Fieldhouse; 16,541	28–18

February : 6–6 (home: 5–4; road: 1–2)

Game	Date	Team	Score	High points	High rebounds	High assists	Location Attendance	Record
47	February 1	Charlotte	W 105–95	Goran Dragić (25)	Miles Plumlee (11)	Goran Dragić (4)	US Airways Center; 16,248	29–18
48	February 4	Chicago	L 92–101	Goran Dragić (24)	Miles Plumlee (10)	Gerald Green (5)	US Airways Center; 16,636	29–19
49	February 5	@ Houston	L 108–122	Goran Dragić (23)	Goran Dragić, Gerald Green, Markieff Morris, Miles Plumlee (6)	Goran Dragić (8)	Toyota Center; 18,217	29–20
50	February 8	Golden State	W 122–109	Goran Dragić (34)	P. J. Tucker (15)	Goran Dragić (10)	US Airways Center; 17,846	30–20
51	February 11	Miami	L 97–103	Gerald Green (26)	P. J. Tucker (8)	Goran Dragić (9)	US Airways Center; 17,927	30–21
All-Star Break
52	February 18	@ Denver	W 112–107 (OT)	Gerald Green (36)	Markieff Morris (12)	Goran Dragić (14)	Pepsi Center; 16,461	31–21
53	February 19	Boston	W 100–94	Markieff Morris (18)	P. J. Tucker (11)	Goran Dragić, P. J. Tucker (6)	US Airways Center; 16,135	32–21
54	February 21	San Antonio	W 106–85	Markieff Morris (21)	Channing Frye (8)	Goran Dragić, Markieff Morris (5)	US Airways Center; 18,422	33–21
55	February 23	Houston	L 112–115	Goran Dragić (35)	Markieff Morris, Miles Plumlee, P. J. Tucker (7)	Ish Smith (4)	US Airways Center; 15,510	33–22
56	February 25	Minnesota	L 101–110	Markieff Morris (24)	P. J. Tucker (16)	Ish Smith (7)	US Airways Center; 16,273	33–23
57	February 26	@ Utah	L 86–109	Gerald Green (17)	Ish Smith (8)	Ish Smith (5)	EnergySolutions Arena; 19,639	33–24
58	February 28	New Orleans	W 116–104	Goran Dragić (40)	Miles Plumlee (8)	Ish Smith (6)	US Airways Center; 16,578	34–24

March : 10–6 (home: 5–2; road: 5–4)

Game	Date	Team	Score	High points	High rebounds	High assists	Location Attendance	Record
59	March 2	Atlanta	W 129–120	Gerald Green (33)	Marcus Morris (9)	Goran Dragić (8)	US Airways Center; 16,759	35–24
60	March 4	L.A. Clippers	L 96–104	P. J. Tucker (18)	P. J. Tucker (10)	Goran Dragić (9)	US Airways Center; 15,068	35–25
61	March 6	Oklahoma City	W 128–122	Gerald Green (41)	P. J. Tucker (9)	Goran Dragić, Ish Smith, P. J. Tucker (4)	US Airways Center; 17,816	36–25
62	March 9	@ Golden State	L 107–113	Gerald Green (25)	P. J. Tucker (9)	Goran Dragić (6)	Oracle Arena; 19,596	36–26
63	March 10	@ L.A. Clippers	L 105–112	Goran Dragić (23)	P. J. Tucker (10)	Goran Dragić (5)	Staples Center; 19,226	36–27
64	March 12	Cleveland	L 101–110	Goran Dragić (20)	Markieff Morris, Miles Plumlee (10)	Eric Bledsoe (9)	US Airways Center; 17,902	36–28
65	March 14	@ Boston	W 87–80	Goran Dragić (20)	Eric Bledsoe, P. J. Tucker (10)	Eric Bledsoe, Goran Dragić (4)	TD Garden; 18,624	37–28
66	March 16	@ Toronto	W 121–113	Gerald Green (28)	Markieff Morris (14)	Goran Dragić (4)	Air Canada Centre; 18,717	38–28
67	March 17	@ Brooklyn	L 95–108	Markieff Morris (18)	Channing Frye, Miles Plumlee (6)	Ish Smith (6)	Barclays Center; 17,401	38–29
68	March 19	Orlando	W 109–93	Goran Dragić (18)	Miles Plumlee (9)	Eric Bledsoe, Goran Dragić (6)	US Airways Center; 17,508	39–29
69	March 21	Detroit	W 98–92	Eric Bledsoe (23)	Markieff Morris (8)	Eric Bledsoe, Goran Dragić (5)	US Airways Center; 18,422	40–29
70	March 23	@ Minnesota	W 127–120	Markieff Morris (25)	Markieff Morris, P. J. Tucker (8)	Goran Dragić (6)	Target Center; 17,866	41–29
71	March 24	@ Atlanta	W 102–95	Eric Bledsoe (20)	P. J. Tucker (11)	Goran Dragić (6)	Philips Arena; 12,240	42–29
72	March 26	@ Washington	W 99–93	Goran Dragić (25)	P. J. Tucker (9)	Eric Bledsoe (7)	Verizon Center; 18,805	43–29
73	March 28	New York	W 112–88	Goran Dragić (32)	Miles Plumlee (12)	Eric Bledsoe (6)	US Airways Center; 17,106	44–29
74	March 30	@ L.A. Lakers	L 99–115	Gerald Green (22)	Markieff Morris (12)	Ish Smith (5)	Staples Center; 18,355	44–30

April : 4–4 (home: 1–2; road: 3–2)

Game	Date	Team	Score	High points	High rebounds	High assists	Location Attendance	Record
75	April 2	L.A. Clippers	L 108–112	Marcus Morris (16)	P. J. Tucker (11)	Goran Dragić (8)	US Airways Center; 16,091	44–31
76	April 4	@ Portland	W 109–93	Gerald Green (32)	Miles Plumlee (16)	Ish Smith (4)	Moda Center; 20,089	45–31
77	April 6	Oklahoma City	W 122–115	Goran Dragić (26)	P. J. Tucker (7)	Goran Dragić (5)	US Airways Center; 18,422	46–31
78	April 9	@ New Orleans	W 94–88	Gerald Green (21)	P. J. Tucker (9)	Goran Dragić (9)	Smoothie King Center; 16,256	47–31
79	April 11	@ San Antonio	L 104–112	Eric Bledsoe (30)	Eric Bledsoe (11)	Eric Bledsoe (9)	AT&T Center; 18,501	47–32
80	April 12	@ Dallas	L 98–101	Eric Bledsoe (29)	Gerald Green (7)	Eric Bledsoe (6)	American Airlines Center; 20,413	47–33
81	April 14	Memphis	L 91–97	Markieff Morris (21)	Goran Dragić (6)	Eric Bledsoe (5)	US Airways Center; 18,422	47–34
82	April 16	@ Sacramento	W 104–99	Archie Goodwin (29)	Marcus Morris (6)	Ish Smith (8)	Sleep Train Arena; 17,317	48–34

2013–14 season schedule

== Player statistics ==
Legend
GP	Games played	GS	Games started	MPG	Minutes per game
FG%	Field-goal percentage	3P%	3-point field-goal percentage	FT%	Free-throw percentage
RPG	Rebounds per game	APG	Assists per game	SPG	Steals per game
BPG	Blocks per game	PPG	Points per game

Player	GP	GS	MPG	FG%	3P%	FT%	RPG	APG	SPG	BPG	PPG
Leandro Barbosa*	20	0	18.4	.427	.280	.795	1.9	1.6	.4	.2	7.5
Eric Bledsoe	43	40	32.9	.477	.357	.772	4.7	5.5	1.6	.3	17.7
Dionte Christmas	31	0	6.4	.355	.290	.750	1.2	.3	.1	.1	2.3
Goran Dragić	76	75	35.1	.505	.408	.760	3.2	5.9	1.4	.3	20.3
Channing Frye	82	82	28.2	.432	.370	.821	5.1	1.2	.7	.8	11.1
Archie Goodwin	52	0	10.3	.455	.139	.673#	1.7	.4	.4	.2	3.7
Gerald Green	82	48	28.4	.445	.400	.848	3.4	1.5	.9	.5	15.8
Viacheslav Kravtsov*	20	0	3.0	.513	.000	.500	.9	.1+	.0	.1	1.0
Olexsiy "Alex" Len	42	3	8.6	.423	.000	.645	2.4+	.1	.1	.4+	2.0
Marcus Morris	82	1	22.0	.442†	.381	.761	3.9+	1.1	.9	.2+	9.7
Markieff Morris	81	0	26.6	.486	.315	.792	6.0	1.8	.8	.6	13.8
Miles Plumlee	80	79	24.6	.517	.000	.561	7.8	.5	.6	1.1	8.1
Shavlik Randolph*	14	0	6.8	.500†	.000	.545#	1.8	.1	.2	.1	1.4+
Ish Smith	70	1	14.4	.423†	.043	.564	1.8	2.6	.7	.2	3.7
P. J. Tucker	81	81	30.7	.431†	.387	.776	6.5	1.7	1.4	.3	9.4

* – Stats with the Suns.
† – Minimum 300 field goals made.
^ – Minimum 55 three-pointers made.
# – Minimum 125 free throws made.
+ – Minimum 70 games played or 800 rebounds, 125 steals, 100 blocks, 1400 points.

== Awards and records ==
=== Awards ===
- P. J. Tucker was nominated for the NBA Defensive Player of the Year Award.
- Coach Jeff Hornacek was named the runner-up for the NBA Coach of the Year Award.
- Goran Dragić won the NBA Most Improved Player of the Year Award on April 23, 2014. Gerald Green was also a top 4 candidate and Markieff Morris was nominated for said award as well.
- Channing Frye was a top 3 nominee for the NBA Sportsmanship Award.
- Markieff Morris was a top 4 nominee for the NBA Sixth Man of the Year Award.
- Goran Dragić was nominated for the NBA Most Valuable Player of the Year Award.
- New general manager Ryan McDonough was named the runner-up for the NBA Executive of the Year Award.
- Channing Frye was nominated for the Twyman-Stokes Teammate of the Year Award.
- Mike Elliott was named the NBA's Strength & Conditioning Coach of the Year.
- Goran Dragić was honored with Slovenia's "Javbolko Navdiha" (Apple of Inspiration) for his performance throughout the season with not just the Suns, but also with the Slovenian national basketball team during the 2013 EuroBasket Tournament (which included an All-EuroBasket Team spot) held in Slovenia.
- Both P. J. Tucker and Eric Bledsoe were considered nominees for the All-Defensive Team participation.
- Goran Dragić was named a member of the All-NBA Third Team due to his overall performance throughout the regular season. He had also become only the fourth winner of the Most Improved Player of the Year Award to also find a spot on an All-NBA team on their exact same season that they first won that award (the other three being Tracy McGrady, Jermaine O'Neal, and last season's winner Paul George). He had also been the most recent Suns player since Steve Nash and Amar'e Stoudemire (or Shaquille O'Neal in terms of who most recently joined up for Phoenix during that time) to have been nominated for an All-NBA Team spot.

==== Week and month ====
- Power forward Markieff Morris won his first ever Player of the Week award for his improved production that he created while off the bench from the week of November 4–11, 2013, by creating 22.8 points on 69.8% shooting, 8 assists, and 2 steals per game. It's also the first time since Amar'e Stoudemire in 2008 that a Suns player won the Western Conference's Player of the Week award.
- Coach Jeff Hornacek won his first Coach of the Month award for his 10–3 month with the Suns during December. It was also his first award as a head coach in the NBA.
- Guard Goran Dragić won his second ever Player of the Week award, as well as the first he received with the Suns by averaging 26.8 points on 63.9% shooting and 69.2% three point shooting, 6 assists, and 4 rebounds while averaging 29.2 minutes per game in all four victories during that week, with two full games having Goran recovering from an elbow injury during their road game against the Milwaukee Bucks from the week of January 27 to February 2, 2014. It is also the first time since the 2006–07 NBA season that the Suns would have more than one player winning the Player of the Week Award, with Steve Nash winning it three times and Amar'e Stoudemire winning it once during that time.

==== All-Star ====
- Goran Dragić gets paired up with Oklahoma City Thunder player Reggie Jackson as one of the 8 different contestants to participate in the newly revamped Taco Bell Skills Challenge on February 6, 2014.
- Miles Plumlee is announced as the replacement player to the Atlanta Hawks' rookie center Pero Antić for the BBVA Rising Stars Challenge on February 7, 2014, after it was confirmed that Pero Antić would end up missing the event. Miles would, by default, end up playing for former Suns player Grant Hill's team, while his younger brother Mason would end up being a player for Chris Webber's team.

=== Team records ===
- Jeff Hornacek became the first Suns head coach to ever start out his season as a new coach with 4 wins and 0 losses at home.
- The Suns would allow the Cleveland Cavaliers only 6 points in the entire third quarter on January 26, 2014. This ties a record that the Suns would hold a team down a career-low in points during a non-overtime period (with the first two times occurring on February 28, 1999 against the Golden State Warriors and February 21, 2002 against the Memphis Grizzlies, both of which would occur in the fourth quarter).
- Ish Smith would provide the team's lowest three-point percentage of players that have attempted 20 or more three-pointers in a season.

=== Team milestones ===
- Their 14–9 start is the best start the Suns had for the regular season in over three years.
  - Continuing their start into a 28–18 record as of January 30, 2013 makes their start also the best they had since the 2007–08 season.
- During the road trip from January 25–30, 2014, they got their first road trip winning sweep since 2010.
- The Suns' 30–21 record before the NBA All-Star Weekend begins was the best pre-All-Star Weekend record since the 2007–08 NBA season.
- Leandro Barbosa surpassed center Neal Walk as the Suns' 15th best scorer of all-time on February 18, 2014. He scored his 6,011th point with a minute left in the first quarter against the Denver Nuggets on the road. The two points he scored on that shot were his only two of the night. He added two rebounds, an assist, and a steal in a close 112–107 overtime victory over Denver.
- Goran Dragic's 40 point performance on February 28, 2014, against the New Orleans Pelicans was the first time since Amar'e Stoudemire back in 2010 that a Suns player recorded 40 or more points in a single game.
- Their 41st victory against the Minnesota Timberwolves on March 23, 2014, helped make the Suns get their first .500+ season since the 2011–12 NBA season (or 2009–10 NBA season due to it being the last season with a full schedule at hand).
  - Their 42nd victory they got against the Atlanta Hawks a day later also clinched their first winning season since the 2009–10 NBA season.
- The Suns' six-game winning streak they had starting with their March 19, 2014 home victory against the Orlando Magic was the longest winning streak the team had since the end of the 2009–10 NBA season.
- Goran Dragić surpassed center and current assistant head coach Mark West as the Suns' 30th best scorer of all-time on March 28, 2014. He scored his 3,762nd point halfway in the first quarter against the New York Knicks at home. He ultimately scored 32 points (18 points in the first quarter), adding two rebounds and four assists in a blowout 112–88 victory over New York.
- Goran Dragić surpassed shooting guard Joe Johnson as the Suns' 29th best scorer of all-time on April 6, 2014. He scored his 3,848th point with 3:50 remaining in the second quarter against the Oklahoma City Thunder at home. He ultimately scored 26 points in the entire game (19 points in the second quarter), adding two rebounds and five assists in a close 122–115 victory over Oklahoma City.

== Injuries and personal missed games ==
- October 30, 2013: Markieff Morris missed out on the opening game of the regular season due to a one-game suspension related to an incident happening with Serge Ibaka during a preseason game against the Oklahoma City Thunder. Emeka Okafor would also miss the entire season due to a neck injury he received during training camp with his former team, the Washington Wizards, on September 18, 2013.
- November 3, 2013: Goran Dragić injured his left ankle during a third quarter play against the Oklahoma City Thunder. He would miss three more games as a result of the injury. Olexsiy "Alex" Len would also be listed as day-by-day on his progress due to his left ankle rehabilitation. He would miss 7 games with those concerns before returning to play against the Sacramento Kings on November 19, 2013.
- November 19, 2013: Eric Bledsoe injured his left shin due to a collision with teammate P. J. Tucker during practice. He would miss six games because of it before returning to play on November 29, 2013, against the Utah Jazz.
- November 20, 2013: Olexsiy "Alex" Len re-injured his left knee after a home game against the Sacramento Kings a day after returning to play. He would miss close to two months worth of games before returning on January 7, 2014, against the Chicago Bulls.
- December 30, 2013: Eric Bledsoe swelled up his right knee in a collision play against his former team, the Los Angeles Clippers, during the third quarter. His swollen knee later on resulted in a torn meniscus, which left Bledsoe out for two months and a near fortnight. This injury helped influence the Suns to re-sign Leandro Barbosa to the team for the rest of the season. Bledsoe would finally return on March 12, 2014, at a home game against the Cleveland Cavaliers.
- January 15, 2014: Leandro Barbosa was out for two games due to a right shoulder sprain that he'd get after the road game against the New York Knicks. He'd return on January 19, 2014, for his first home game with the Suns in 4 years against the Denver Nuggets immediately after he signed his second 10-day contract.
- January 23, 2014: Archie Goodwin gets assigned to the Suns' D-League affiliate, the Bakersfield Jam, for two games. Goodwin would return to the Suns for the road game against the Cleveland Cavaliers on January 26, 2014.
- February 5, 2014: Archie Goodwin gets assigned to the Bakersfield Jam once again for two more games. Goodwin would return to the Suns on February 10, 2014, before the Suns played against the two-time defending champion Miami Heat at home and the All-Star Weekend began.
- February 21, 2014: Leandro Barbosa injured his left big toe after their 100–94 home victory against the Boston Celtics. He would miss five games in the process before returning on March 2, 2014, against the Atlanta Hawks.
- February 26, 2014: Goran Dragić injured his right ankle during the fourth quarter against the Minnesota Timberwolves. He would miss only the last road game against the Utah Jazz before coming back on February 28 against the New Orleans Pelicans.
- March 4, 2014: Miles Plumlee was out for two games due to an injured knee before coming back in a road game against the Golden State Warriors. This resulted in rookie Olexsiy "Alex" Len to be the team's starting center during their first home game against the Los Angeles Clippers, as well as their first home game against the Oklahoma City Thunder (with Len starting in place of Plumlee for the Warriors game as well before taking over the starting role for the rest of the season). Leandro Barbosa also fractured his right hand during the home game against the Clippers. As a result, Barbosa would miss the rest of his last season with the team.
- March 12, 2014: P. J. Tucker served a one-game suspension due to an on-court incident involving Blake Griffin in a loss to the Los Angeles Clippers.
- April 11, 2014: Goran Dragić injured his right ankle during their last match-up against the New Orleans Pelicans. He missed only the last road game against the San Antonio Spurs before he came back a day later against the Dallas Mavericks.

== Transactions ==
=== Trades ===
June 27, 2013

To Phoenix Suns

(United States) Archie Goodwin
(United States) Malcolm Lee

To Golden State Warriors

(Serbia) / (Socialist Federal Republic of Yugoslavia) Nemanja Nedović

July 2, 2013
Three–team trade
To Los Angeles Clippers

(United States) Jared Dudley (from Phoenix)
(United States) JJ Redick (from Milwaukee)

To Milwaukee Bucks

2014 second round pick (from Toronto via Phoenix)
2017 first round pick (from L.A. Clippers)

To Phoenix Suns

(United States) Eric Bledsoe (from L.A. Clippers)
(United States) Caron Butler (from L.A. Clippers)

July 27, 2013

To Phoenix Suns

(United States) Gerald Green
(United States) Miles Plumlee
2014 lottery protected first round pick

To Indiana Pacers

(Argentina) Luis Scola

August 29, 2013

To Phoenix Suns

(Ukraine) / (Soviet Union) Viacheslav "Slava" Kravtsov
(United States) Ish Smith

To Milwaukee Bucks

(United States) Caron Butler

October 25, 2013

To Phoenix Suns

(United States) Chukwuemeka "Emeka" Okafor
2014 Top-12 Protected first round pick

To Washington Wizards

(Poland) Marcin Gortat
(United States) Kendall Marshall
(United States) Shannon Brown
(United States) Malcolm Lee

=== Free agents ===
==== Additions ====
Player	Signed	Former team
Dionte Christmas	Signed 2-year deal worth $1.3 million	(Italy) Montepaschi Siena
Leandro Barbosa	Signed two 10-day contracts / 1-year contract worth $650,359	Boston Celtics / Washington Wizards / (Brazil) Esporte Clube Pinheiros / Phoenix Suns
Shavlik Randolph	Signed 1-year deal worth $306,036	Boston Celtics / (China) Foshan Dralions

a: During this season, Barbosa played under the Esporte Clube Pinheiros in the Novo Basquete Brasil league. However, before that time, Barbosa played with the Boston Celtics up until he had a season-ending injury with the team on February 12, 2013. He then got traded to the Washington Wizards nine days later, only to never play a game for them in the process. After his first 10-day contract ended with the Suns, he signed a second 10-day contract immediately afterwards before finally staying on the team for the rest of the season on January 27, 2014.
b: Throughout most of this season, Randolph ended up playing for the Foshan Dralions as one of the team's two different foreign players the team's allowed to have during their season. However, before playing in China with Foshan once again, Randolph had played under the Boston Celtics and remained with the team until he was waived on August 1, 2014. Because Foshan was eliminated from playoff contention before Randolph was signed onto the team on March 1, 2014, he did not have to worry about any penalties that might have been received from China.

==== Subtractions ====
Player	Reason left	New team
Hamed Haddadi	Waived	(Iran) Foolad Mahan Isfahan / (China) Sichuan Blue Whales / (Iran) Mahram Tehran
Jared Dudley	Traded	Los Angeles Clippers
Wesley Johnson	Unrestricted free agent	Los Angeles Lakers
Jermaine O'Neal	Unrestricted free agent	Golden State Warriors
Luis Scola	Traded	Indiana Pacers
Alex Oriakhi	Signed a new contract	(France) Limoges Cercle Saint-Pierre / (Israel) Hapoel Holon / Erie BayHawks / Sioux Falls Skyforce
Diante Garrett	Unrestricted free agent	Oklahoma City Thunder / Tulsa 66ers / Iowa Energy / Utah Jazz
Caron Butler	Traded	Milwaukee Bucks / Oklahoma City Thunder
Michael Beasley	Waived	Miami Heat
Marcin Gortat	Traded	Washington Wizards
Kendall Marshall	Traded / Waived	Washington Wizards / Delaware 87ers / Los Angeles Lakers
Shannon Brown	Traded / Waived	Washington Wizards / San Antonio Spurs / New York Knicks
Malcolm Lee	Traded / Waived	Washington Wizards / Philadelphia 76ers / Delaware 87ers
Viacheslav "Slava" Kravtsov	Waived	(China) Foshan Dralions

c: During the off-season, Haddadi played for the Iranian Foolad Mahan Isfahan basketball team during the 2013 FIBA Asia Champions Cup in September. The team won the Champions Cup, but his performance ended up gaining interest to the recently Chinese Basketball Association promoted Sichuan Blue Whales, who used to play in the Chinese National Basketball League until winning that basketball league's championship and being promoted by the CBA. He officially signed with Sichuan on September 28, 2013 and continued to play with the team until the end of the 2013–14 CBA season. After his season with Sichuan ended, which included a respectable first season CBA record for a new team, Haddadi decided to return to his home nation once again to play for Mahram Tehran at the Iranian Super League on February 19, 2014 for the rest of the season.
d: Second-round rookie Alex Oriakhi decided to sign with the French Limoges Cercle Saint-Pierre team on July 31, 2013, after having a lackluster showcase on the Suns' Summer League team. However, after playing in France for a few games, Oriakhi decided to leave Limoges on November 8, 2013. Three days later, Oriakhi decided to play for the Israeli team known as Hapoel Holon. Oriakhi would continue to play in Israel until December 21, 2013 where he decided to return to the U.S.A. to play for the D-League's Erie BayHawks in Erie, Pennsylvania. He'd continue to play in Erie until February 7, 2014 where he got traded to the Sioux Falls Skyforce in South Dakota. Even though Oriakhi is currently playing basketball for the Miami Heat's D-League affiliate, his NBA rights are still retained by the Phoenix Suns.
e: On August 30, 2013, Diante Garrett signed with the Oklahoma City Thunder as a means of trying to make it to their roster. However, while Garrett did end up playing for the Thunder, he was ultimately waived by the Thunder before the NBA's regular season began on October 25. Garrett then signed up for the D-League's Tulsa 66ers on Halloween and then was traded to the Iowa Energy the next day (while not officially playing for either team as well) before finally playing for the Utah Jazz on November 13, 2013.
f: Even though Caron Butler never played with the Suns, he still wound up being a part of the team for around 6-7 weeks before being traded to his hometown team in the Milwaukee Bucks. Butler would continue to end up playing for the Bucks until he got waived on February 27, 2014. He'd end up signing onto the Oklahoma City Thunder four days later on March 1, 2014.
g: In the trade in which the Suns sent Kendall Marshall, Shannon Brown, and Malcolm Lee to the Washington Wizards, all three of those players were waived by the team immediately afterwards. Therefore, while each of those players was traded to the Wizards alongside Marcin Gortat, only Gortat stayed on their roster once the trade came to pass. Marshall would end up playing for the Delaware 87ers in the D-League on December 3, 2013 before signing a multi-year contract with the Los Angeles Lakers on December 19, 2013, while Brown would end up signing two 10-day contracts to play for the eventual champion San Antonio Spurs (while also waiving shooting guard and former Phoenix Suns training camp candidate Othyus Jeffers from their team) on February 1, 2014, only to then get waived after finishing his second 10-day contract with San Antonio on February 21, 2014, and then signing with the New York Knicks alongside former Suns player Earl Clark on February 26, 2014, before officially staying with the Knicks for the rest of the year on March 20, 2014, after successfully completing his second 10-day contract on March 10, 2014; Malcolm Lee would miss the entire 2013–14 NBA season being making an agreement to play with the Philadelphia 76ers on September 24, 2014 before being cut after the pre-season ended on October 25, 2014, and then sign with the affiliated Delaware 87ers in the D-League on November 3, 2014, before returning with the 76ers on December 5, 2014 to play an official game for them before being waived six days later when the 76ers traded Brandon Davies to the Brooklyn Nets for Andrei Kirilenko, Jorge Gutiérrez, and a 2020 second round pick (he'd end up playing with the 87ers again two days later and remained there until January 30, 2015).
h: Throughout the rest of the season, Viacheslav "Slava" Kravtsov did not sign with a new team in either the NBA or in an international country, regardless of whether it's in his home nation of Ukraine or a new nation altogether. In the summer, however, he did participate in Ukraine's first ever FIBA World Championship in 2014. On September 16, 2014, Kravtsov signed a new contract to play for the Foshan Dralions (which would later be officially named the Foshan Long-Lions by the time Kravtsov signed with them) of the Chinese Basketball Association (which coincidentally enough was his replacement's former team before signing with the Suns late in the season).

== See also ==
- 2013–14 NBA season
