= Stephen Kaufman =

Stephen Kaufman or variant spellings may refer to:

- Stephen B. Kaufman, American politician
- S. K. Thoth (born 1956), born Stephen Kaufman, American performance artist
- Steve Kaufman (1960–2010), American artist
- Steve A. Kauffman, American professional sports agent
- Steven Kaufman (born 1977), American entrepreneur and philanthropist
- Steve Kaufmann (born 1945), Swedish-born Canadian hyperpolyglot
