= Miles Plumlee =

American basketball player (born 1988)

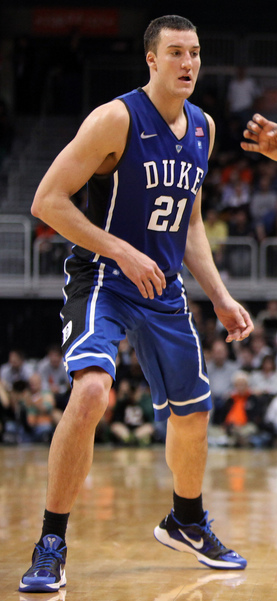
- Plumlee with the Duke Blue Devils in 2011

Personal information
- Born: September 1, 1988 (age 38) Fort Wayne, Indiana, U.S.
- Listed height: 6 ft 11 in (2.11 m)
- Listed weight: 249 lb (113 kg)

Career information
- High school: Warsaw Community (Warsaw, Indiana); Christ School (Arden, North Carolina)
- College: Duke (2008–2012)
- NBA draft: 2012: 1st round, 26th overall pick
- Drafted by: Indiana Pacers
- Playing career: 2012–2020
- Position: Center / power forward
- Number: 13, 22, 21, 18

Career history
- 2012–2013: Indiana Pacers
- 2012–2013: →Fort Wayne Mad Ants
- 2013–2015: Phoenix Suns
- 2015–2017: Milwaukee Bucks
- 2017: Charlotte Hornets
- 2017–2019: Atlanta Hawks
- 2017: →Erie BayHawks
- 2019–2020: Zhejiang Lions
- 2020: Perth Wildcats

Career highlights
- NBL champion (2020); NCAA champion (2010)
- Stats at NBA.com
- Stats at Basketball Reference

Miles Christian Plumlee (born September 1, 1988) is an American former professional basketball player. He played four years of college basketball for the Duke Blue Devils, winning a national championship in 2010. He was selected with the 26th overall pick in 2012 NBA draft by the Indiana Pacers and went on to have a seven-year NBA career. He won an NBL championship with the Perth Wildcats in 2020.

== High school career ==
Plumlee attended Warsaw Community High School in Warsaw, Indiana, and then Christ School in Arden, North Carolina, where his team had a 63–6 record in his tenure there. Plumlee attended Warsaw Community for his freshman, sophomore and junior seasons before transferring to Christ School after issues arose with the coach. He repeated his junior year while at Christ School.

He was twice named to the NCISAA Private School all-state team and to the Asheville Citizen-Times All-Western North Carolina first team. He also lettered in track in his senior year, setting a new school record in high jump.

Considered a three-star recruit by Rivals.com, Plumlee was listed as the No. 28 power forward and the No. 101 player in the nation in 2008.

== College career ==
Plumlee had originally committed to play at Stanford University for the 2008–09 season, but after Stanford coach Trent Johnson left for LSU and brother Mason had committed to play at Duke the following year, he chose to become a Blue Devil. After playing a limited role his freshman season, Plumlee earned the starting center position over senior Brian Zoubek at the beginning of the 2009–10 season before returning to a bench role later in the season. Plumlee finished the championship-winning season averaging 5.2 points and 4.9 rebounds in 16.4 minutes per game.

Miles played a similar role in his junior campaign to that of his sophomore, contributing solid offense and defense for the team in limited playing time. He finished the season averaging 4.8 points and 4.9 rebounds in 17 minutes per game. In his final season in 2011–12, Plumlee played the majority of the season off the bench. He had his best season statistically, averaging the second most rebounds per game for the team with 7.1, behind brother Mason, and leading the team in field goal percentage at 61%. In one game against Maryland, he grabbed 22 rebounds - the most ever by a player coached by Mike Krzyzewski. In all, Plumlee completed his four seasons at Duke with 654 rebounds and 650 points in 135 games.

== Professional career ==
=== Indiana Pacers (2012–2013) ===
Plumlee was selected with the 26th overall pick in 2012 NBA draft by his home team, the Indiana Pacers. He spent the majority of his rookie season in the NBA Development League with the Fort Wayne Mad Ants, playing only 55 minutes across 14 games for the Pacers during the 2012–13 season.

=== Phoenix Suns (2013–2015) ===
On July 27, 2013, Plumlee was traded to the Phoenix Suns alongside Gerald Green and a 2014 lottery protected first-round draft pick in exchange for Luis Scola. In 2013–14, Plumlee averaged career highs in points (8.1), rebounds (7.8), blocks (1.1), and minutes (24.6). He had a career-high 20 rebounds on December 23 against the Los Angeles Lakers, and a career-high 22 points on December 28 against the Philadelphia 76ers. In February 2014, he competed in the BBVA Rising Stars Challenge.

=== Milwaukee Bucks (2015–2017) ===
On February 19, 2015, Plumlee was acquired by the Milwaukee Bucks in a three-team trade involving the Suns and the Philadelphia 76ers. He played out the 2014–15 season with the Bucks and then continued on with them in 2015–16. On August 2, 2016, he re-signed with the Bucks on a four-year, $52 million contract.

=== Charlotte Hornets (2017) ===
On February 2, 2017, Plumlee was traded, along with cash considerations, to the Charlotte Hornets in exchange for Spencer Hawes and Roy Hibbert.

=== Atlanta Hawks (2017–2019) ===
On June 20, 2017, Plumlee was traded, along with Marco Belinelli and the 41st overall pick in the 2017 NBA draft, to the Atlanta Hawks in exchange for Dwight Howard and the 31st overall pick in the 2017 NBA draft. Following off-season surgery on his right knee, Plumlee's conditioning was restricted coming into training camp and he strained his right quadriceps before the opener. On November 15, 2017, he was assigned to the Erie BayHawks of the NBA G League. He was recalled by Atlanta on November 19 and made his debut for the Hawks on November 25 against the Toronto Raptors.

On March 11, 2019, Plumlee suffered a left knee injury during practice while working his way back following a non-surgical procedure on January 7. He underwent a medical examination and MRI on March 25, which revealed a cartilage injury in his left knee.

On July 7, 2019, the Hawks traded Plumlee alongside Solomon Hill to the Memphis Grizzlies for Chandler Parsons. He was waived by the Grizzlies on October 19.

=== Zhejiang Lions (2019–2020) ===
On December 13, 2019, Plumlee signed with the Zhejiang Lions of the Chinese Basketball Association. He was released on January 2, 2020, after appearing in seven games.

=== Perth Wildcats (2020) ===
On January 8, 2020, Plumlee signed with the Perth Wildcats for the rest of the 2019–20 NBL season. In his third game for the Wildcats on January 25, Plumlee recorded 23 points and 18 rebounds in an 80–79 win over the New Zealand Breakers, becoming the first Wildcat to record 20+ points and 15+ rebounds in a game since 2007. In March 2020, he was crowned an NBL champion.

== Career statistics ==
Legend
GP	Games played	GS	Games started	MPG	Minutes per game
FG%	Field goal percentage	3P%	3-point field goal percentage	FT%	Free throw percentage
RPG	Rebounds per game	APG	Assists per game	SPG	Steals per game
BPG	Blocks per game	PPG	Points per game	**Bold**	Career high

=== NBA ===
==== Regular season ====
Year	Team	GP	GS	MPG	FG%	3P%	FT%	RPG	APG	SPG	BPG	PPG
2012–13	Indiana	14	0	3.9	.238	–	**.750**	1.6	.1	.0	.2	.9
2013–14	Phoenix	**80**	**79**	**24.6**	.517	–	.561	**7.8**	.5	**.6**	**1.1**	**8.1**
2014–15	Phoenix	54	28	18.6	.549	–	.500	5.1	.5	**.6**	1.0	4.3
2014–15	Milwaukee	19	0	9.9	.492	–	.375	2.4	.4	.3	.6	3.2
2015–16	Milwaukee	61	14	14.3	.601	–	.576	3.8	.3	.3	.8	5.1
2016–17	Milwaukee	32	12	9.7	.441	–	.629	1.7	.6	.3	.3	2.6
2016–17	Charlotte	13	0	13.4	.583	–	**.750**	3.2	.2	.5	.3	2.4
2017–18	Atlanta	55	35	16.7	.583	–	.450	4.1	.8	.3	.5	4.3
2018–19	Atlanta	18	0	9.6	**.667**	–	.533	2.2	**.9**	.3	.2	4.4
Career		346	168	16.4	.542	–	.543	4.5	.5	.4	.7	4.9

==== Playoffs ====
Year	Team	GP	GS	MPG	FG%	3P%	FT%	RPG	APG	SPG	BPG	PPG
2015	Milwaukee	1	0	16.0	.125	–	.500	6.0	1.0	.0	1.0	3.0
Career		1	0	16.0	.125	–	.500	6.0	1.0	.0	1.0	3.0

=== College ===
Year	Team	GP	GS	MPG	FG%	3P%	FT%	RPG	APG	SPG	BPG	PPG
2008–09	Duke	24	2	6.8	.474	.000	.545	1.4	.0	.2	.5	1.8
2009–10	Duke	**40**	**24**	16.4	.565	**1.000**	**.661**	4.9	.3	.5	.7	5.2
2010–11	Duke	37	16	18.0	.576	.000	.548	5.2	**.6**	**.7**	.7	5.2
2011–12	Duke	34	16	**20.5**	**.610**	.000	.632	**7.1**	.5	.5	**.9**	**6.7**
Career		135	58	16.2	.574	1.000	.611	4.9	.4	.5	.7	5.0

== Personal life ==
Miles has three siblings: brothers, Mason and Marshall, and sister, Madeleine. All three brothers participated in Duke's basketball program and won championships with the team there. Mason was drafted at pick 22 in the 2013 NBA draft by the Brooklyn Nets. His sister, Madeleine, played volleyball at the University of Notre Dame.

His father, Perky, played basketball at Tennessee Tech, and his mother, Leslie, set the school single-game rebound record with 25 for the Purdue Boilermakers women's basketball team. The two met at a basketball camp during the summer of 1979. His grandfather, Albert "Bud" Schultz, played basketball at Michigan Tech (1944), his uncle, William Schultz, played basketball at Wisconsin-Eau Claire (1971–72), and another uncle, Chad Schultz, played basketball at Wisconsin-Oshkosh (1983–86). Another of Plumlee's uncles, Victor Ashe, is the former mayor of Knoxville, Tennessee and is a former US Ambassador to Poland.

In January 2023, Plumlee married Australian model Catherine McNeil in New York City.
