= Steve A. Kauffman =

American professional sports agent

Steve A. Kauffman is an American professional sports agent who currently represents many prominent National Basketball Association (NBA) and collegiate coaches.

== Background and education ==
Kauffman holds a bachelor's degree in accounting from Temple University and a Juris Doctor from the University of Pennsylvania Law School.

== Early career ==
Kauffman began working in the sports industry in the 1970s, at the age of 27, providing accounting and legal services for such clients as Muhammad Ali and basketball Hall of Famers Julius Erving and Charles Barkley. He subsequently founded KSMG where he represented a number of high-profile professional athletes such as Dominique Wilkins and Rony Seikaly. Kauffman negotiated many notable contracts, including the record-setting Jon Koncak $13.2 million, six-year deal, making the journeyman center the 5th highest paid basketball player at that time.

Kauffman invented the 'player opt out' and 'love of the game' clauses, both common in modern professional athlete contracts. Kauffman's first National Football League (NFL) client was Chicago Bears first-round Draft pick Brian Urlacher, whom Kauffman represented for eight years.

Kauffman also served as the Commissioner of the Eastern Basketball Association, which expanded under his leadership and became known as the Continental Basketball Association (CBA). The CBA was the world's first professional basketball league.

== Current work ==
Kauffman's current NBA head coaching clients include Michael Malone, Jeff Hornacek, Lionel Hollins, Steve Clifford, and Monty Williams. He also represents numerous assistant coaches. Front office clients include Chris Wallace, Ryan McDonough, John Hammond, Pete D'Alessandro, Jeff Bower and Donnie Walsh. Other notable past and present clients include Paul Westphal, Jon Koncak, Eric Snow, Ron Darling, and Dominique Wilkins. College basketball coaching clients include Dave Pilipovich, Ed DeChellis, Mark Price, and Brian Fish.

== Personal life ==
A Philadelphia native, Kauffman relocated to Malibu, California, in 1995. Kauffman has 3 children with his ex-wife Christine Winfree Kauffman (Matt, Jake, and Casson) and grandchildren (Boden, Isabelle, Wesley, Jack and Kate ) as well as two step children with his wife Jan Schriber (Jill and Lisa) with two step grandchildren (Aiden and Alyssa)and one puppy (Hunter).
