= Jeff Hornacek =

American basketball player and coach (born 1963)

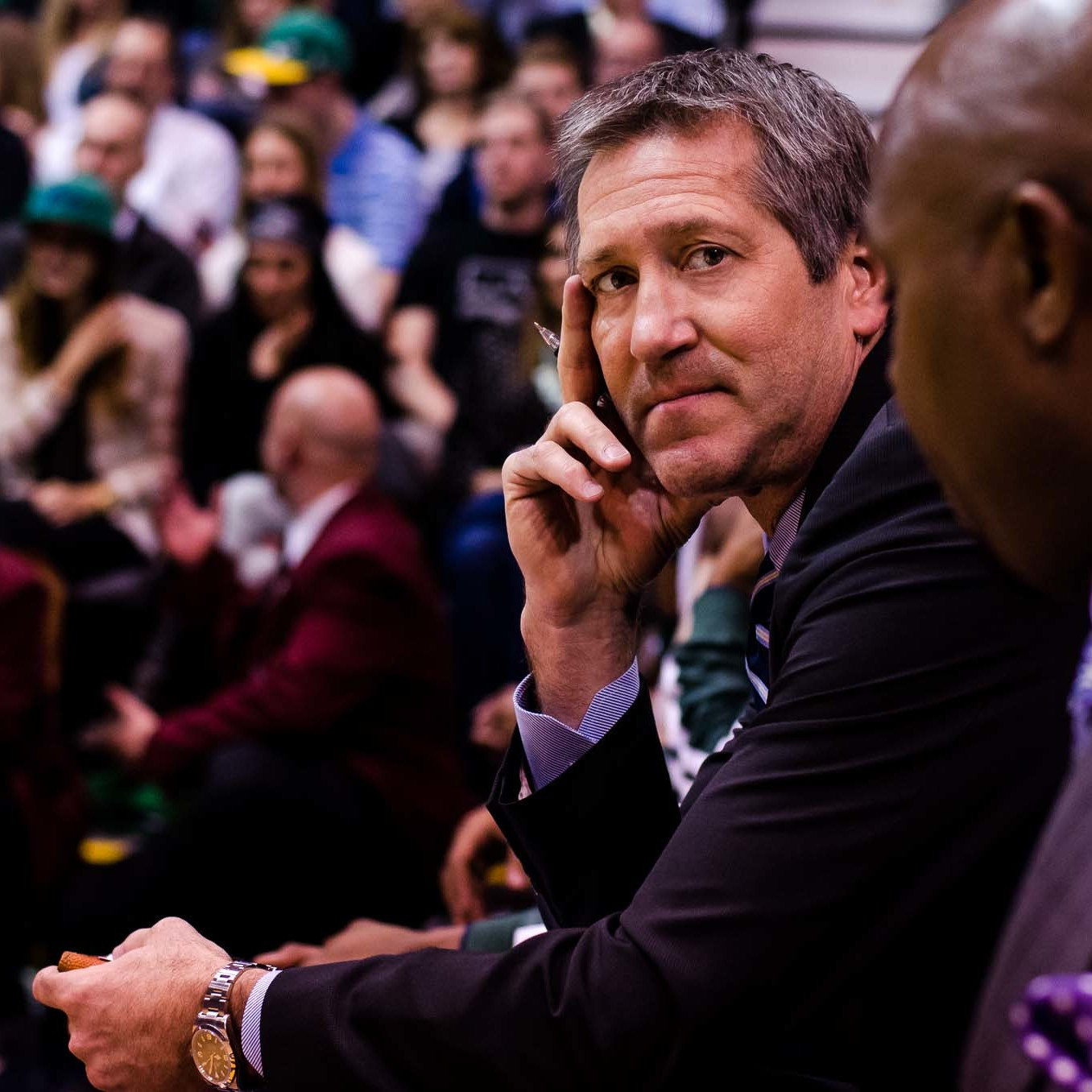
- Hornacek in 2013

Utah Jazz
- Title: Coaching consultant
- League: NBA

Personal information
- Born: May 3, 1963 (age 63) Elmhurst, Illinois, U.S.
- Listed height: 6 ft 4 in (1.93 m)
- Listed weight: 190 lb (86 kg)

Career information
- High school: Lyons Township (La Grange, Illinois)
- College: Iowa State (1982–1986)
- NBA draft: 1986: 2nd round, 46th overall pick
- Drafted by: Phoenix Suns
- Playing career: 1986–2000
- Position: Shooting guard / point guard
- Number: 14
- Coaching career: 2011–Present

Career history

Playing
- 1986–1992: Phoenix Suns
- 1992–1994: Philadelphia 76ers
- 1994–2000: Utah Jazz

Career highlights
- NBA All-Star (1992); 2× NBA Three-Point Contest champion (1998, 2000); No. 14 retired by Utah Jazz; First-team All-Big Eight (1986); No. 14 retired by Iowa State Cyclones

Career NBA statistics
- Points: 15,659 (14.5 ppg)
- Rebounds: 3,646 (3.4 rpg)
- Assists: 5,281 (4.9 apg)
- Stats at NBA.com
- Stats at Basketball Reference

Jeffrey John Hornacek (/ˈhɔːrnəsɛk/; born May 3, 1963) is an American professional basketball coach and a former player who is a coaching consultant for the Utah Jazz of the National Basketball Association (NBA). He previously was the head coach for both the Phoenix Suns (2013–2016) and the New York Knicks (2016–2018). He was also an assistant coach for the Houston Rockets. He played shooting guard in the NBA from 1986 through 2000 and played collegiately at Iowa State University.

== Elementary and high school ==
He attended Komarek Elementary School in North Riverside, Illinois, and Gurrie Middle School and Lyons Township High School in La Grange, Cook County, Illinois.

== College ==
Hornacek redshirted at Iowa State University (ISU) in 1981; he was a team walk-on who played from 1982 to 1986. The son of a high school basketball coach, he became an all-conference player in the Big Eight Conference, playing for coach Johnny Orr. As a point guard he guided the Cyclones to the Sweet Sixteen of the 1986 NCAA tournament. His shining moment came at the Metrodome in Minneapolis when, after first hitting a shot to tie the game and send it to overtime, Hornacek hit the game winning shot in overtime, a 26-foot jumper at the buzzer, to give ISU its first NCAA tournament victory since 1944, beating Miami University, March 14, 1986, 81–79. Two days later, he led the Cyclones to the NCAA Tournament Sweet Sixteen, in a 72–69 upset of second seed Michigan. Orr, who had previously left Michigan to coach at Iowa State, called it the greatest victory of his career. Hornacek left ISU with a Big-8 record of 665 career assists and 1,313 career points. He was the fourth player in Cyclone basketball history to have his number retired when his No. 14 jersey was hung from the rafters of Hilton Coliseum in 1991.

== NBA career ==
=== Phoenix Suns ===
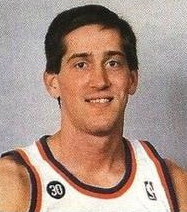
Hornacek in 1987

He was the 22nd pick in the second round (46th overall) of the 1986 NBA draft, by the Phoenix Suns. The 2nd round draft pick that was used to select him was traded three times before finally ending up with the Suns. First, the Los Angeles Lakers packaged it in the deal to acquire Byron Scott from the San Diego Clippers before the 1983–84 season. A week later, the Clippers sent the pick to the Detroit Pistons in a deal to acquire Ricky Pierce, and on that same day, the Pistons dealt the pick to the Suns for David Thirdkill.

The Suns struggled in Hornacek's first two seasons, but after hiring Cotton Fitzsimmons as a coach and acquiring free agent Tom Chambers, the Suns went from 28 wins in 1987–88 to 55 in 1988–89. Hornacek was a "third option" on offense after Chambers and Kevin Johnson. This trio led the Suns to four straight NBA playoff appearances, including two Western Conference Finals. In the 1991–92 season, he led the Suns in scoring average (20.1 points per game) and earned an All-Star appearance. Hornacek won NBA Player of the Month honors in December 1991.

=== Philadelphia 76ers ===
In 1992, Hornacek was traded (along with Andrew Lang and Tim Perry) to the Philadelphia 76ers for Charles Barkley. With Hersey Hawkins, the Sixers' leading scorer, in the shooting guard position, Hornacek was assigned point guard responsibilities. Although he had a career high 6.9 assists per game in his only complete season with the Sixers (1992–93 season), his stint as a point guard was not a success (26 wins, 56 losses). Midway through the 1993–94 season (February 24) he was traded to the Utah Jazz (for Jeff Malone) where he could return to his natural shooting guard position alongside John Stockton.

=== Utah Jazz ===
As in Phoenix, Hornacek was a complementary "third option". Along with Karl Malone and John Stockton, he was an integral part of the Jazz teams that made the NBA Finals in 1997 and 1998.

On November 23, 1994, he set a then-NBA record with eight consecutive three-pointers in a single game against the Seattle SuperSonics. That same season, he also tied an NBA record 11 consecutive three-pointers, from December 30, 1994, through January 11, 1995. One of the best free throw shooters in the league, once making 67 in a row (November 12, 1999 – January 6, 2000), he had a well-known habit of stroking the side of his face three times before every free-throw attempt, signaling recognition of his three children, Tyler, Ryan and Abigaile. He holds a career free throw percentage of 87.7, 16th highest in NBA history.

Hornacek won the NBA three-point competition twice, and, along with Natalie Williams, star of the Utah Starzz, won the All-Star 2-Ball Challenge. He remained with the Jazz until knee problems forced his retirement in 2000. Wear and tear had left his left knee not only arthritic but with no remaining lateral meniscus, such that he could no longer fully extend his left leg and would likely need knee replacement. At season's end, he quit basketball with plans to spend more time with his family. Hornacek's No. 14 jersey was retired by the Utah Jazz, for whom he played from 1994 to 2000, and helped get them to the NBA Finals in 1997 and 1998. Coach Jerry Sloan and Jazz announcer "Hot Rod" Hundley referred to Hornacek affectionately as "Horny". All in all, Hornacek enjoyed a 14-year NBA playing career and played 1,077 games.

== NBA career statistics ==
Legend
GP	Games played	GS	Games started	MPG	Minutes per game
FG%	Field goal percentage	3P%	3-point field goal percentage	FT%	Free throw percentage
RPG	Rebounds per game	APG	Assists per game	SPG	Steals per game
BPG	Blocks per game	PPG	Points per game	**Bold**	Career high
*	Led the league

=== Regular season ===
Year	Team	GP	GS	MPG	FG%	3P%	FT%	RPG	APG	SPG	BPG	PPG
1986–87	Phoenix	80	3	19.5	.454	.279	.777	2.3	4.5	.9	.1	5.3
1987–88	Phoenix	**82**	49	27.4	.506	.293	.822	3.2	6.6	1.3	.1	9.5
1988–89	Phoenix	78	73	31.9	.495	.333	.826	3.4	6.0	1.7	.1	13.5
1989–90	Phoenix	67	60	34.0	**.536**	.408	.856	4.7	5.0	1.7	.2	17.6
1990–91	Phoenix	80	77	34.2	.518	.418	.897	4.0	5.1	1.4	.2	16.9
1991–92	Phoenix	81	81	**38.0**	.512	.439	.886	**5.0**	5.1	**2.0**	**.4**	**20.1**
1992–93	Philadelphia	79	78	36.2	.470	.390	.865	4.3	**6.9**	1.7	.3	19.1
1993–94	Philadelphia	53	53	37.6	.455	.313	.873	4.0	5.9	1.8	.2	16.6
1993–94	Utah	27	9	30.6	.509	.429	.891	2.5	3.9	1.2	.1	14.6
1994–95	Utah	81	81	33.3	.514	.406	.882	2.6	4.3	1.6	.2	16.5
1995–96	Utah	**82**	59	31.6	.502	.466	.893	2.5	4.1	1.3	.2	15.2
1996–97	Utah	**82**	**82***	31.6	.482	.369	.899	2.9	4.4	1.5	.3	14.5
1997–98	Utah	80	80	30.8	.482	.441	.885	3.4	4.4	1.4	.2	14.2
1998–99	Utah	48	48	29.9	.477	.420	.893	3.3	4.0	1.1	.3	12.2
1999–00	Utah	77	77	27.7	.492	**.478**	**.950**	2.4	2.6	.9	.2	12.4
Career		1,077	910	31.5	.496	.403	.877	3.4	4.9	1.4	.2	14.5
All-Star		1	0	24.0	.714	.500	–	2.0	3.0	1.0	.0	11.0

=== Playoffs ===
Year	Team	GP	GS	MPG	FG%	3P%	FT%	RPG	APG	SPG	BPG	PPG
1989	Phoenix	12	12	31.2	.497	.000	.840	5.8	5.2	1.3	.3	14.1
1990	Phoenix	16	16	36.4	**.511**	.250	**.932**	3.9	4.6	1.5	.0	18.6
1991	Phoenix	4	4	36.3	.431	.500	.929	6.3	2.0	.8	**.5**	18.3
1992	Phoenix	8	8	42.9	.484	.471	.912	**6.4**	**5.3**	**1.8**	.3	**20.4**
1994	Utah	16	16	34.9	.475	.441	.912	2.4	4.0	1.5	.4	15.4
1995	Utah	5	5	35.6	.510	.538	.786	1.2	4.0	1.6	.2	14.0
1996	Utah	18	18	35.8	.502	**.586**	.890	3.6	3.3	1.1	.2	17.5
1997	Utah	**20**	**20**	35.2	.433	.358	.876	4.5	3.7	1.1	.2	14.6
1998	Utah	**20**	**20**	31.8	.416	.467	.846	2.5	3.2	1.0	.2	10.9
1999	Utah	11	11	27.6	.462	.389	.879	3.7	2.4	1.0	.0	12.2
2000	Utah	10	10	29.7	.422	.409	.833	3.0	3.3	1.0	.0	11.5
Career		140	140	34.0	.470	.433	.886	3.8	3.8	1.2	.2	14.9

== Coaching career ==
He was hired for the 2007–08 season by the Jazz as a special assistant coach and to help Andrei Kirilenko and others with their shooting. In May 2008 Hornacek interviewed for a coaching position with the Chicago Bulls, meeting with general manager John Paxson. He put off seeking a coaching position until his children were older so the extensive travel would not put excess pressure on his family. After the departure of Jerry Sloan and Phil Johnson in February 2011, Jeff Hornacek became a full assistant coach with the Utah Jazz.

During 2013, Hornacek was considered a head coach candidate for two of his former teams, the Philadelphia 76ers and the Phoenix Suns, as well as the Charlotte Bobcats. On May 28, 2013, he was named the head coach of the Phoenix Suns. Hornacek has stated that his coaching style is reminiscent to that of Cotton Fitzsimmons and Sloan, who both coached him back when he played for the coaches' respective teams. Hornacek also coached the Suns' Summer League team during the 2013 season in Las Vegas. In his first game as head coach at the Summer League, he helped lead the team to an 82–69 victory over the Portland Trail Blazers. The Suns went on a six-game winning streak before ultimately losing in the inaugural championship round to the Golden State Warriors 91–77. Hornacek was 5–2 in pre-season and he started the 2013–14 NBA season with a 104–91 victory over the Portland Trail Blazers and an 87–84 victory over the Utah Jazz, both times at home. Hornacek also became the team's first ever head coach to start out his coaching stint with a 4–0 record at home games.

Hornacek won the NBA Coach of the Month award in December 2013, his first coaching honor, after leading the Suns to a 10–3 record during the month. Hornacek also became the third former NBA player to win both Player of the Month and Coach of the Month awards (after Larry Bird and Larry Drew), and the first coach to receive both awards with the same team. For the season, the Suns improved by 23 victories upon the previous season's record, which led to a 48–34 record in Hornacek's first season as a head coach. This accomplishment led to the Phoenix Suns becoming the most improved team during the 2013–14 NBA season. Despite this improvement, the Suns still missed the playoffs. Hornacek was the runner-up coach in the NBA Coach of the Year Award receiving 37 1st place votes. He lost to three-time winner Gregg Popovich.

On February 1, 2016, Hornacek was fired as head coach of the Phoenix Suns after two-and-a-half seasons in the position. On June 2, 2016, the New York Knicks officially announced Hornacek as their new head coach. His first season in New York held a promising enough start, to the point where the team had a 16–13 record early on. However, malcontent surrounding the Knicks between the front office and some of their players resulted in Hornacek having a 31–51 record by the end of the season. On April 12, 2018, the Knicks fired Hornacek after a 29–53 season. On November 30, 2020, Hornacek was hired by the Houston Rockets as an assistant coach.

On September 15, 2022, Hornacek was hired by the Utah Jazz as a coaching consultant.

== Head coaching record ==
Legend
Regular season	G	Games coached	W	Games won	L	Games lost	W–L %	Win–loss %
Playoffs	PG	Playoff games	PW	Playoff wins	PL	Playoff losses	PW–L %	Playoff win–loss %

Team	Year	G	W	L	W–L%	Finish	PG	PW	PL	PW–L%	Result
Phoenix	2013–14	82	48	34	.585	3rd in Pacific	—	—	—	—	Missed playoffs
Phoenix	2014–15	82	39	43	.476	3rd in Pacific	—	—	—	—	Missed playoffs
Phoenix	2015–16	49	14	35	.286	(fired)	—	—	—	—	—
New York	2016–17	82	31	51	.378	3rd in Atlantic	—	—	—	—	Missed playoffs
New York	2017–18	82	29	53	.354	4th in Atlantic	—	—	—	—	Missed playoffs
Career		277	161	216	.427		—	—	—	—	

== Stats ==
Iowa State University records:

- Career steals: 211
- Career complete games: 30
- Season assists: 219 (1985–1986; 2nd w/198 1983–1984)
- Season, assists per-game average: 6.83 (1984; 2nd w/6.63 – 1986)

NBA totals:

- Games: 1,077
- Minutes played: 33,959
- Points: 15,659 (14.5 per game)
- Assists: 5,281 (4.9 per game)
- Steals: 1,536 (1.43 per game)

== Personal life ==
Hornacek is of Czech descent. He is the brother-in-law of Phoenix Suns athletic trainer Aaron Nelson. When Joe Proski was the Suns' head athletic trainer, Hornacek recommended Nelson as an assistant for him. Nelson would be his assistant in 1993 before being the head athletic trainer in 2000 onward. Hornacek's father, John, was a high school coach for basketball and baseball at St. Joseph High School in Westchester, Illinois. Hornacek considers his father, alongside Cotton Fitzsimmons and Jerry Sloan, as an influence towards his coaching career.

Hornacek married his wife Stacy on June 7, 1986. Jeff and Stacy have three children: Ryan (born 1989), Tyler (born 1990) and Abby (born 1994). Abby became a digital host for the online 120 Sports network in 2016, and joined Fox Nation in 2019. Jeff has two brothers, one named John, who played his senior season at Lyons Township High School in 1990.

Hornacek was an active member of St. Vincent de Paul Catholic Church in Salt Lake City in 2002.

Hornacek is represented by Steve A. Kauffman and Spencer Breecker of Kauffman Sports Management Group.

== See also ==
- List of NBA career steals leaders
- List of NBA career 3-point field goal percentage leaders
- List of NBA career free throw percentage leaders
