= Gerald Green =

American basketball player (born 1986)

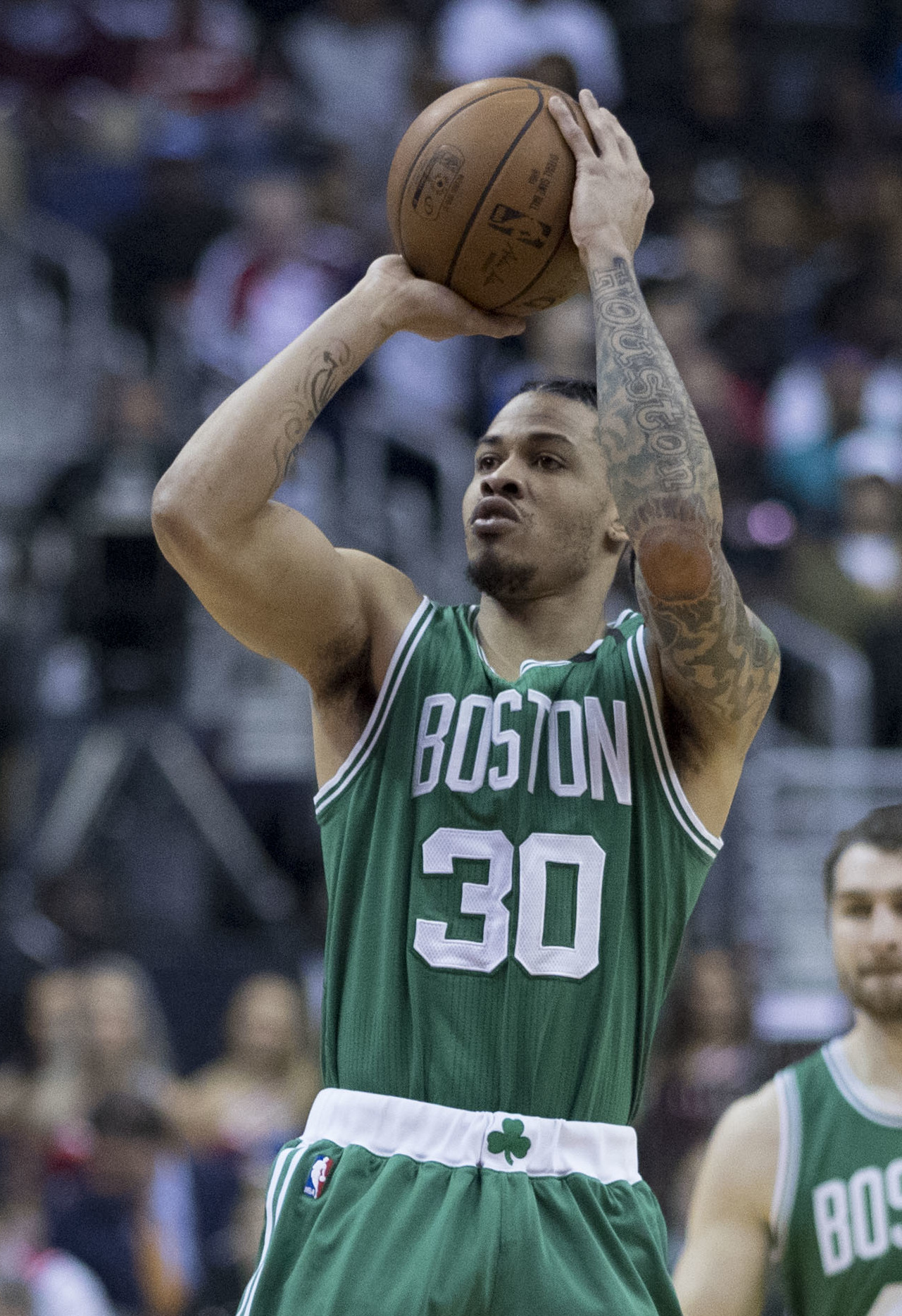
- Green with the Boston Celtics in 2017

Personal information
- Born: January 26, 1986 (age 40) Houston, Texas, U.S.
- Listed height: 6 ft 7 in (2.01 m)
- Listed weight: 205 lb (93 kg)

Career information
- High school: Gulf Shores Academy (Houston, Texas)
- NBA draft: 2005: 1st round, 18th overall pick
- Drafted by: Boston Celtics
- Playing career: 2005–2022
- Position: Shooting guard / small forward
- Number: 5, 8, 14, 15, 25, 30

Career history

Playing
- 2005–2007: Boston Celtics
- 2006: →Fayetteville Patriots
- 2006: →Florida Flame
- 2007–2008: Minnesota Timberwolves
- 2008: Houston Rockets
- 2008–2009: Dallas Mavericks
- 2009–2010: Lokomotiv Kuban
- 2010–2011: Krasnye Krylia
- 2011: Foshan Dralions
- 2011–2012: Los Angeles D-Fenders
- 2012: New Jersey Nets
- 2012–2013: Indiana Pacers
- 2013–2015: Phoenix Suns
- 2015–2016: Miami Heat
- 2016–2017: Boston Celtics
- 2017–2020: Houston Rockets
- 2022: Rio Grande Valley Vipers

Coaching
- 2021–2022: Houston Rockets (player development)

Career highlights
- NBA Slam Dunk Contest champion (2007); NBA G League champion (2022); NBA D-League All-Star (2012); NBA D-League All-Star Game MVP (2012); McDonald's All-American (2005)
- Stats at NBA.com
- Stats at Basketball Reference

Gerald Green (born January 26, 1986) is an American former professional basketball player. He was drafted by the Boston Celtics with the 18th overall pick in the 2005 NBA draft. Known for his dunking skill, he has performed well in many slam dunk competitions, having won the 2005 McDonald's All-American Slam Dunk Contest and the 2007 NBA Slam Dunk Contest, while finishing as the runner-up in the 2008 NBA Slam Dunk Contest.

== Early life ==
Green was born in Houston, Texas. When he was in the 6th grade, he was involved in an accident that left a significant portion of his right ring finger cut off. He was wearing a ring on his right ring finger when he attempted a dunk on a makeshift basketball hoop. The ring caught onto a nail on the goal and his finger was ripped, with amputation being the only option.

== High school career ==
Green did not play high school basketball until his sophomore year, when he played junior varsity for J. Frank Dobie High School. In his junior year, he made the varsity team, but his play was cut short because of academic issues.

Green transferred to a charter school, Gulf Shores Academy in Houston where he repeated his junior year. In his senior year at Gulf Shores, he averaged 33 points, 12 rebounds, 7 assists, and 3 blocked shots per game. He was named an All-American and was the lead scorer with 24 points in the 2005 McDonald's All-American Game, which features two teams composed of the best high school basketball players in the United States. Green also won the McDonald's All-American Slam Dunk Contest that year, defeating future Duke player Josh McRoberts.

Considered a five-star recruit by Rivals.com, Green was listed as the No. 1 player in the nation in 2005.

Green originally committed to Oklahoma State University, but later decided to enter the NBA draft upon graduation. He hired an agent, thereby making himself ineligible to participate in NCAA athletics.

== Professional career ==
=== Boston Celtics (2005–2007) ===
Green was expected by many analysts to be one of the top players chosen but he fell to the Celtics, who selected him with the 18th pick in the 2005 NBA draft. His fall is attributed to his decision to give individual workouts only for the teams with the top six picks prior to the draft.

Green was one of the last players to enter the NBA directly from high school, as the collective bargaining agreement between NBA owners and the National Basketball Players Association now mandates that American players who enter the draft must be at least one year removed from the graduation of their high school class and reach age 19 no later than December 31 of the calendar year of the draft.

During the preseason, Green averaged 8 points and 1.3 rebounds per game for the Celtics in the 2005 Las Vegas Summer League.

After seeing limited playing time during the first part of the season, Green was placed on the Fayetteville Patriots of the NBA D-League by the Celtics in January 2006. He was recalled and activated to an NBA roster position on February 3. He was reassigned to the NBDL, to the Florida Flame, on February 16. He was recalled and activated again on February 21, and saw his first significant NBA game action on the following night, scoring 13 points and grabbing 9 rebounds in 23 minutes.

He appeared in 32 games and averaged 11.8 minutes, 5.2 points, and 1.2 rebounds during these contests. Green left marks on the league with his highlight plays including a shot clock beating half court three against Indiana and two SportsCenter top play dunks in the closing seconds in two games against the Toronto Raptors.

Over the off-season, Green aimed at improving all aspects of his game in order to gain playing time. He had shown flashes of his capability during the end of the 2005–06 season, but started off the 2006–07 season slowly, earning a somewhat limited role and playing time behind captain Paul Pierce, and swingman Wally Szczerbiak. With injuries to Szczerbiak and Pierce, his playing time increased, but he was unable to nail down a starting role. Green started his first-ever game early December against the Philadelphia 76ers, but then lost his job to a returning Szczerbiak. Green finished the 2006–07 season averaging 10.4 points, 2.6 rebounds and 1.0 assists per game.

On February 17, 2007, Green won the 2007 NBA Slam Dunk Contest, beating out Nate Robinson, Tyrus Thomas, and Dwight Howard.

The season was going very well for Green. On March 16, 2007, he scored a career-high 25 points in a Celtics loss to the Dallas Mavericks, and on April 10, 2007, Green topped that with 33 points (12–22 FG, 4–5 3FG) at Atlanta.

On July 31, 2007, it was made official that Green was to be traded along with Al Jefferson, Ryan Gomes, Theo Ratliff, Sebastian Telfair, and draft picks, to the Minnesota Timberwolves for Kevin Garnett.

=== Minnesota Timberwolves (2007–2008) ===
At Minnesota, Green found himself stuck on the bench behind a number of players at his same position. In early January 2008, Green's agent asked the Timberwolves to trade his client.

At the 2008 NBA Slam Dunk Contest, Green opened the competition with a dunk he called "The Birthday Cake" in which he blew out a birthday candle on a cupcake set on the back of the rim while dunking. He followed that up with an alley-oop two-handed windmill. His first dunk of the second round was an alley-oop from behind the basket which he put between his legs before dunking. His final dunk of the night was a between-the-legs one-handed slam that he performed after taking off his shoes. He ended up finishing second to Dwight Howard, after Howard received seventy-eight percent of the votes cast by fans through text message.

=== Houston Rockets (2008) ===
On February 21, 2008, Green was traded to his hometown team Houston Rockets for Kirk Snyder, a 2010 second-round draft pick, and cash considerations. He was subsequently released by the Rockets on March 8 and became an unrestricted free agent in July.

=== Dallas Mavericks (2008–2009) ===
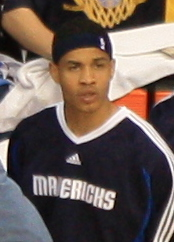
Green with the Mavericks in 2009

On July 1, 2008, Green signed with the Dallas Mavericks. His agent Colin Bryant told Fox 26 Sports, "We have a verbal agreement with Dallas on a one year contract, We talked to a number of teams and there is more money out there, but this is the best situation for Gerald at this point in his career."

Green was not supposed to go to the summer league, but chose to go to learn the plays and get a feeling of the Mavericks organization early and not let his chance slip away. In the Vegas Summer League he averaged an underwhelming 13.3 ppg and 3.8 rpg on 38% shooting from the field. On a bright note, he was 43% from beyond the arc. Following the Vegas Summer League, the Mavericks and Green participated in the Rocky Mountain Revue, a summer league held in Salt Lake City, Utah. There in just 25.8 mpg Green averaged 17.7 ppg to go with 2.7 rpg, 1.8 apg, 1 spg, .5 bpg, and a respectable 2.2 topg. This time around, Green shot a much more impressive 45%, including going 12 for 26 from behind the three point line (46%), and 28–31 from the free throw line (90%). His overall performance was enough to earn him All-Revue Team honors.

=== Lokomotiv Kuban (2009–2010) ===
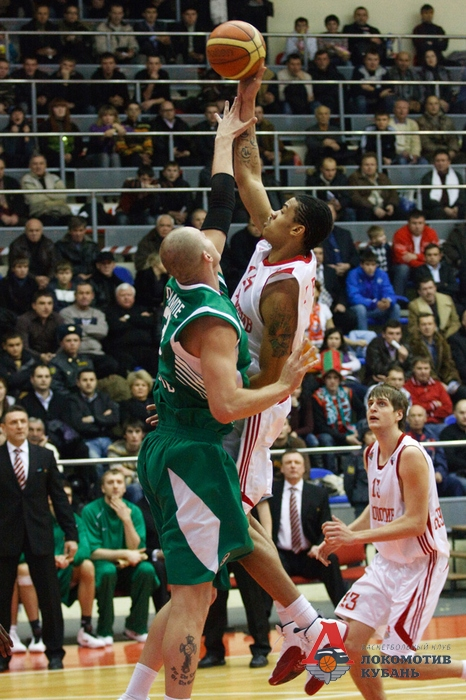
Green attempting a shot as a player of Lokomotiv Kuban

Green signed with PBC Lokomotiv Kuban of Russia in December 2009. The Lokomotiv Kuban waived him in June 2010.

=== Krasnye Krylia (2010–2011) ===
Green was named to the Los Angeles Lakers roster for the 2010 NBA Summer League. After the Summer League, he signed with BC Krasnye Krylya, also a Russian team.

=== Foshan Dralions (2011) ===
In October 2011, Green moved to China, signing a one-year contract with the Foshan Dralions. On December 2, 2011, Green was released by Foshan.

=== Los Angeles D-Fenders (2011–2012) ===
On December 13, 2011, Green signed with the Los Angeles Lakers as an opportunity to return to the NBA. However, Green was waived by the Lakers on December 22 just days before the shortened regular season began.

On December 28, 2011, Green signed with the Los Angeles D-Fenders of the NBA Development League. He played at the NBA D-League All-Star Game and was awarded the NBA D-League All-Star Game Most Valuable Player. Over the season, he averaged 19.1 points, 2.6 rebounds and 1.6 assists per game. He recorded a season-high of 35 points against the Erie BayHawks.

=== New Jersey Nets (2012) ===
The New Jersey Nets signed Green to a 10-day contract on February 27, 2012. He was signed to a second 10-day contract on March 8, 2012. His dunk against the Houston Rockets on March 10, 2012, was called "one of the dirtiest in-game windmill alley-oops in NBA history". On March 18, 2012, he was signed for the rest of the season. Through the season he averaged 12.9 points, 1.1 assists and 3.5 rebounds in 31 games played.

=== Indiana Pacers (2012–2013) ===
On July 12, 2012, Green signed with the Indiana Pacers. During the 2013 All-Star weekend, Green participated in his third NBA Slam Dunk Contest.

=== Phoenix Suns (2013–2015) ===
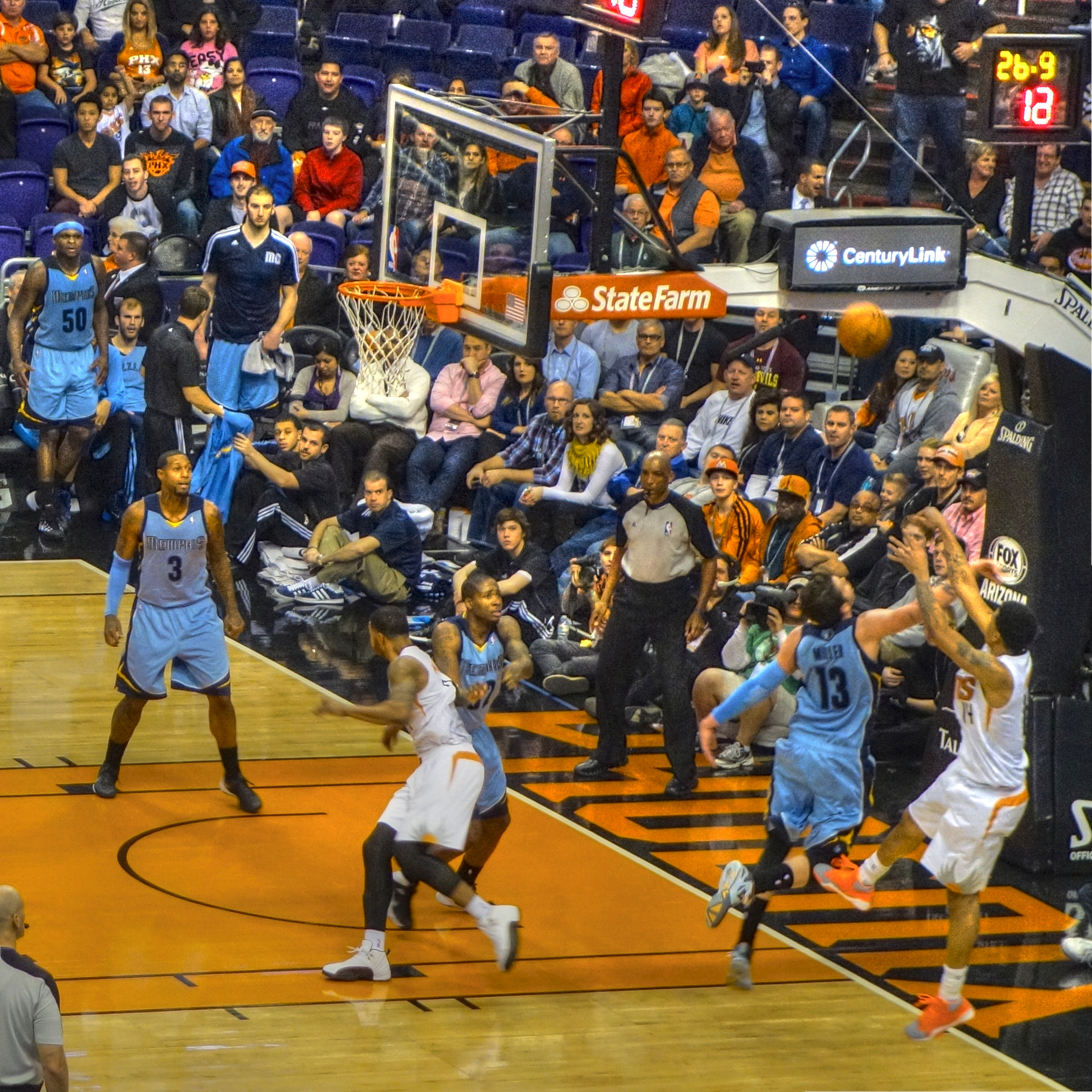
Green shooting a fadeaway jumper as a member of the Suns

On July 27, 2013, Green was traded to the Phoenix Suns alongside Miles Plumlee and a future first-round pick for Luis Scola. Green started for the Suns when fellow guards Goran Dragić and Eric Bledsoe were injured during their respective periods in November 2013. He received more starting time with the Suns after Bledsoe had a major knee injury during January, February, and early March 2014. Throughout this period, Green would take over some games as being the team's leading scorer, including a 112–107 overtime victory against the Denver Nuggets, in which he'd record a then-career-high 36 points against them, which included making 8 of the team's 13 points in overtime.

On March 6, 2014, Green recorded a new career-high 41 points, including a career-high 8 made three-pointers, in a 128–122 victory over the Oklahoma City Thunder. When Eric Bledsoe returned to action on March 12, 2014, Green returned to his bench role. Green finished the season with new career highs in points per game and free-throw percentage. As a result, he finished fourth in the NBA Most Improved Player Award behind Anthony Davis, Lance Stephenson, and Green's teammate Goran Dragić.

On April 8, 2015, Green scored a season-high 30 points on 10-of-19 shooting in a 104–107 loss to the Dallas Mavericks.

=== Miami Heat (2015–2016) ===
On July 9, 2015, Green signed with the Miami Heat. He made his debut for the Heat in the team's season opener against the Charlotte Hornets on October 28, scoring 19 points off the bench in a 104–94 win. On November 27, he scored a season-high 25 points while starting in place of the injured Luol Deng, helping the Heat defeat the New York Knicks 97–78. He topped that mark on April 1, 2016, scoring 30 points while starting in place of the injured Dwyane Wade, helping the Heat defeat the Sacramento Kings 112–106.

=== Return to Boston (2016–2017) ===
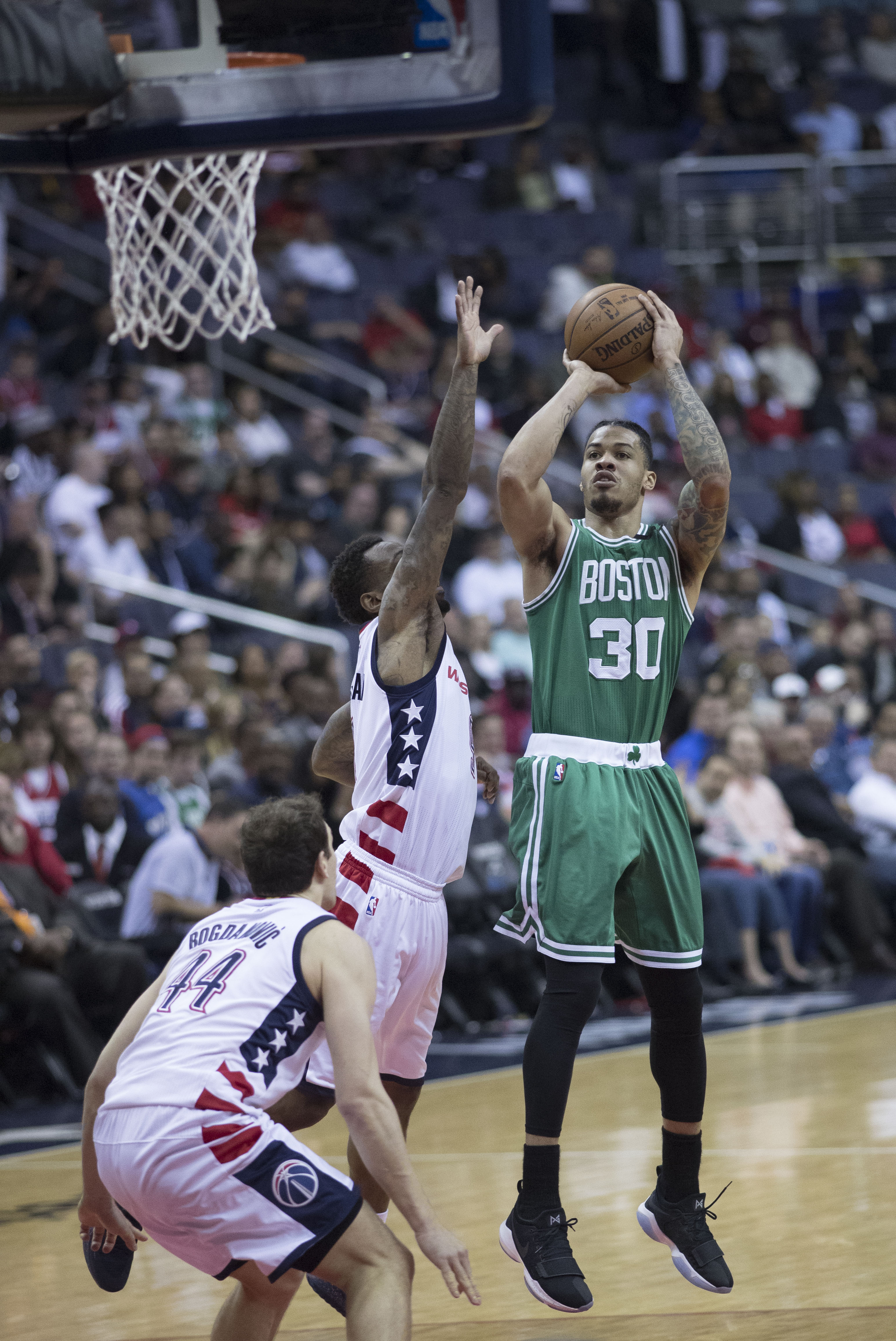
Green with the Celtics in 2017

On July 27, 2016, Green signed with the Boston Celtics, returning to the franchise for a second stint. On December 27, 2016, he scored a season-high 19 points in a 113–103 win over the Memphis Grizzlies. On April 23, 2017, in Game 4 of the Celtics' first-round playoff series against the Chicago Bulls, Green had a postseason career-high 18 points, 16 of which were tallied before halftime.

=== Return to Houston (2017–2020) ===
On September 24, 2017, Green signed with the Milwaukee Bucks. He was waived on October 14, after appearing in four preseason games.

On December 28, 2017, Green returned with the Houston Rockets for a second stint. On January 3, 2018, he scored a season-high 27 points in a 116–98 win over the Orlando Magic. Two days later, Green came off the bench to score 29 and tie a career high with eight 3-pointers in a 124–114 loss to the Golden State Warriors. He became the first player in franchise history to make seven or more 3-pointers in consecutive games after he made seven against Orlando. On January 17, Green was suspended for two games without pay for entering the Los Angeles Clippers' locker room after a game against the team two days earlier. On March 30, Green hit a buzzer-beating three-pointer to snatch a win against the Phoenix Suns.

On July 10, 2018, Green re-signed with the Rockets.

On July 22, 2019, Green re-signed with the Rockets. On October 28, the Rockets announced that Green had undergone surgery to repair a broken bone in his left foot and would be sidelined for approximately six months.

On February 5, 2020, the Rockets traded Green to the Denver Nuggets in a four-team trade, and the Nuggets waived Green two days later. On December 1, 2020, Green re-signed with the Houston Rockets to a one-year non-guaranteed deal. On December 19, the Rockets waived Green.

=== Rio Grande Valley Vipers (2022) ===
On January 8, 2022, Green came out of retirement and signed with the Rio Grande Valley Vipers, averaging 18 points and 5.1 rebounds. He won his first championship when the Vipers won the 2022 NBA G League Finals.

== Coaching career ==
On October 22, 2021, Green announced his retirement and joined the Houston Rockets coaching staff as a player development coach.

== Player profile ==
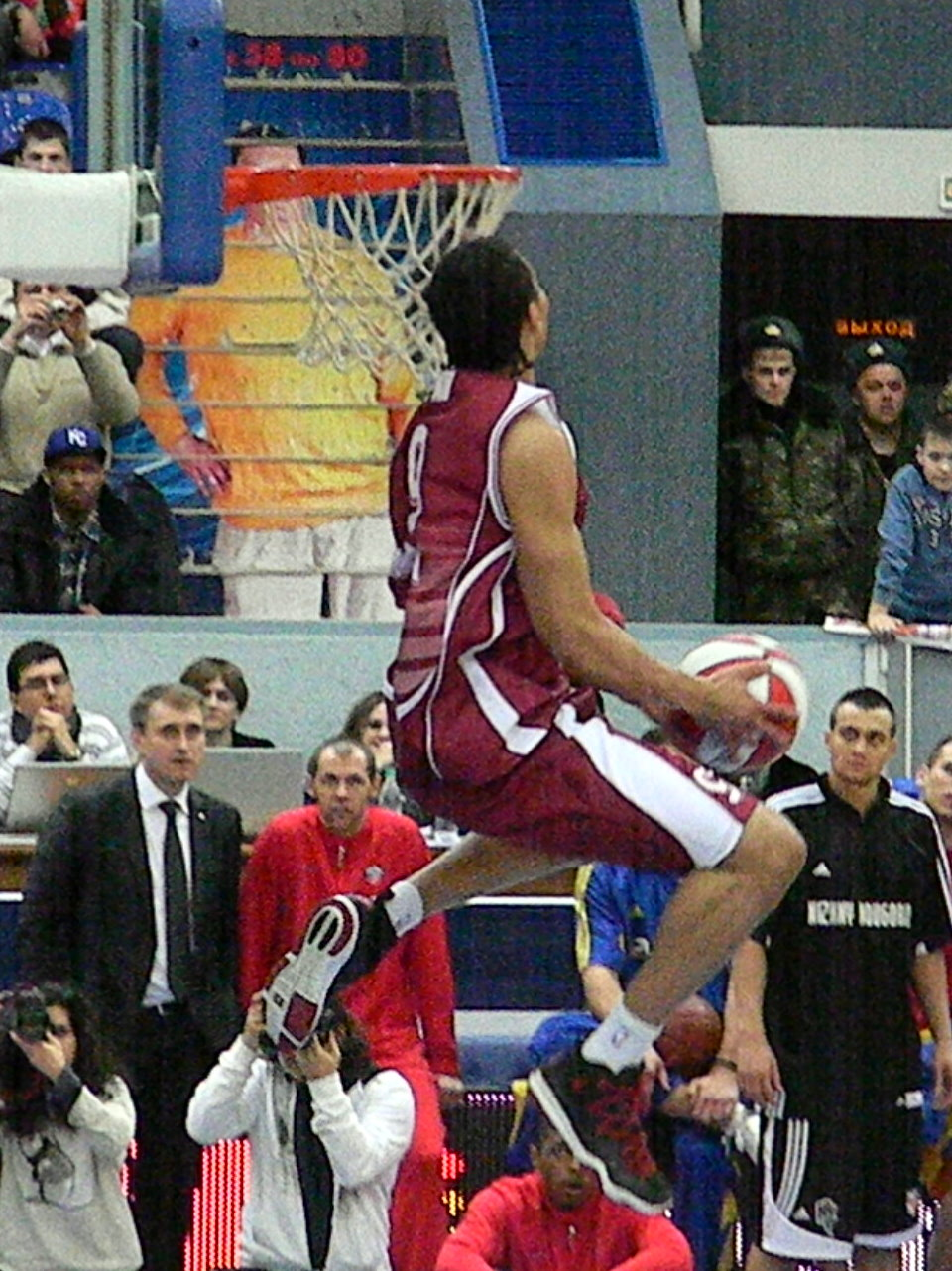
Green dunking the ball in 2011

Green drew comparisons to future Houston Rockets teammate and star Tracy McGrady in the period leading up to the 2005 NBA draft.

== Personal life ==
Green's second cousin is former NBA player Danny Green. He also has a younger brother, Garlon, who is also a professional basketball player for CSM Oradea in Romania. He formerly played for TCU before going to play in Europe.

== NBA career statistics ==
Legend
GP	Games played	GS	Games started	MPG	Minutes per game
FG%	Field goal percentage	3P%	3-point field goal percentage	FT%	Free throw percentage
RPG	Rebounds per game	APG	Assists per game	SPG	Steals per game
BPG	Blocks per game	PPG	Points per game	**Bold**	Career high

=== Regular season ===
Year	Team	GP	GS	MPG	FG%	3P%	FT%	RPG	APG	SPG	BPG	PPG
2005–06	Boston	32	3	11.7	.478	.300	.784	1.3	.6	.4	.1	5.2
2006–07	Boston	81	26	22.0	.419	.368	.805	2.6	1.0	.5	.3	10.4
2007–08	Minnesota	29	0	12.3	.331	.385	.829	2.1	1.0	.3	.1	5.1
2007–08	Houston	1	0	4.0	1.000	.000	.000	2.0	.0	.0	.0	6.0
2008–09	Dallas	38	12	9.9	.439	.304	.844	1.4	.4	.3	.1	5.2
2011–12	New Jersey	31	2	25.2	**.481**	.391	.754	**3.5**	1.1	**.9**	**.5**	12.9
2012–13	Indiana	60	7	18.0	.366	.314	.800	2.4	.8	.3	.4	7.0
2013–14	Phoenix	**82**	**48**	**28.4**	.445	**.400**	.848	3.4	**1.5**	**.9**	**.5**	**15.8**
2014–15	Phoenix	74	4	19.5	.416	.354	.825	2.5	1.2	.6	.2	11.9
2015–16	Miami	69	14	22.6	.392	.323	.783	2.4	.8	.6	.3	8.9
2016–17	Boston	47	0	11.4	.409	.351	.805	1.8	.7	.2	.1	5.6
2017–18	Houston	41	2	22.7	.407	.369	**.850**	3.2	.6	.6	.4	12.1
2018–19	Houston	73	0	20.2	.400	.354	.838	2.5	.5	.5	.4	9.2
Career		658	118	19.8	.417	.361	.818	2.5	.9	.5	.3	9.7

=== Playoffs ===
Year	Team	GP	GS	MPG	FG%	3P%	FT%	RPG	APG	SPG	BPG	PPG
2009	Dallas	6	0	4.3	.286	.200	.500	0.3	0.0	0.2	0.0	1.8
2013	Indiana	9	0	11.7	.420	.333	**1.000**	1.3	0.3	0.0	0.1	6.1
2016	Miami	12	0	9.2	.327	.286	.800	1.4	0.1	**0.3**	0.1	3.3
2017	Boston	13	**7**	14.8	**.472**	**.467**	.889	1.5	**0.7**	0.2	0.1	**7.5**
2018	Houston	**17**	0	**16.0**	.394	.375	.857	**2.9**	0.1	0.2	**0.4**	6.3
2019	Houston	11	0	8.8	.300	.345	**1.000**	1.1	0.1	**0.3**	0.3	3.5
Career		68	7	11.8	.389	.374	.844	1.7	0.2	0.2	0.2	5.1
