= David Morway =

American basketball executive

Utah Jazz
- Position: Senior basketball advisor
- League: NBA

Career history

Coaching
- San Diego Padres (assistant general manager)
- 2008–2012: Indiana Pacers (general manager)
- 2013–2015: Milwaukee Bucks (assistant general manager)
- 2017–2021: Utah Jazz (assistant general manager)

David Morway is an NBA executive who was most recently an assistant general manager with the Utah Jazz, leaving in 2021. Morway was the former general manager of the Indiana Pacers of the National Basketball Association, as well as a former assistant general manager of the Milwaukee Bucks. He had also been an assistant general manager with the San Diego Padres from 1985 to 1988. He is a 1982 graduate of the University of Arizona with a law degree from the University of San Diego.

Morway was a finalist for the Portland Trail Blazers general manager position in 2012.

Morway is married with two sons.
