= Ryan McDonough (NBA executive) =

American basketball general manager (born 1980)

Personal information
- Born: November 20, 1980 (age 45) Hingham, Massachusetts, U.S.

Career information
- College: North Carolina
- Position: General manager

Ryan Michael McDonough (born November 20, 1980) is the former general manager of the Phoenix Suns of the National Basketball Association.

McDonough was hired by the Suns on May 7, 2013. He had previously worked for ten years in the Boston Celtics organization, serving in roles including director of international scouting and assistant general manager to former Celtics/Suns player and head coach Danny Ainge. Under the assistant general manager role, McDonough would get an NBA Finals championship for the Celtics during the 2007–08 season. In his first season as executive of the Suns, he helped recreate the team to give them a 23-win improvement from the 2012–13 season to the 2013–14 season. Despite that, however, he would end up being runner-up for the NBA Executive of the Year Award to R. C. Buford. While McDonough wouldn't reach the same success that he had in his first season with the Suns throughout the rest of his tenure, he still managed to receive a contract extension with Phoenix on July 19, 2017. He also made the primary decision to draft Deandre Ayton as the Suns' first ever #1 pick in 2018.

McDonough was fired from his job as the Suns' General Manager on October 8, 2018. James Jones and Trevor Bukstein would go on to replace McDonough's position in an interim collaboration of sorts during the 2018–19 NBA season before Jones eventually was hired as the permanent general manager going forward.

McDonough is currently an insider and podcast host for Entercom and RADIO.COM Sports.

== Personal life ==
McDonough is the son of Boston Globe columnist writer Will McDonough, as well as the brother of ESPN sportscaster and former Boston Red Sox sportscaster Sean McDonough and former Arizona Cardinals vice president of player personnel Terry McDonough. Ryan is married to Valerie as of July 24, 2015.
