= 2015–16 New Orleans Pelicans season =

- Head coach: Alvin Gentry
- General manager: Dell Demps
- Owner: Tom Benson
- Arena: Smoothie King Center

Results
- Record: 30–52 (.366)
- Place: Division: 5th (Southwest); Conference: 12th (Western)
- Playoff finish: Did not qualify
- Stats at Basketball Reference

Local media
- Television: Fox Sports New Orleans
- Radio: WWL-FM

The 2015–16 New Orleans Pelicans season was the 14th season of the franchise in the National Basketball Association (NBA). The team failed to post a second consecutive winning season and missed the playoffs. Following the season, tragedy struck as Bryce Dejean-Jones was shot dead while shouting for his girlfriend for his daughter's first birthday at the Dallas apartment. Dejean-Jones death was the first for an active NBA player since Eddie Griffin, who died in a car accident in 2007.

== Draft ==
Round	Pick	Player	Position	Nationality	Team
2	56	Branden Dawson	SF / PF	United States	Michigan State

== Roster ==
2015–16 New Orleans Pelicans roster
Players

Pos.	No.	Player	Height	Weight	DOB	From
C	42	Alexis Ajinça	7 ft 2 in (2.18 m)	248 lb (112 kg)	1988-05-06	INSEP
PF	33	Ryan Anderson	6 ft 10 in (2.08 m)	240 lb (109 kg)	1988-05-06	California
C	3	Ömer Aşık	7 ft 0 in (2.13 m)	255 lb (116 kg)	1986-07-04	Turkey
SF	8	Luke Babbitt	6 ft 9 in (2.06 m)	225 lb (102 kg)	1989-06-20	Nevada
PG	30	Norris Cole	6 ft 2 in (1.88 m)	175 lb (79 kg)	1988-10-13	Cleveland State
SF	44	Dante Cunningham	6 ft 8 in (2.03 m)	230 lb (104 kg)	1987-04-22	Villanova
PF	23	Anthony Davis	6 ft 10 in (2.08 m)	253 lb (115 kg)	1993-03-11	Kentucky
SG	31	Bryce Dejean-Jones	6 ft 6 in (1.98 m)	203 lb (92 kg)	1992-08-21	Iowa State
PG	16	Toney Douglas	6 ft 2 in (1.88 m)	195 lb (88 kg)	1986-03-16	Florida State
SF	4	James Ennis	6 ft 7 in (2.01 m)	210 lb (95 kg)	1990-07-01	Long Beach State
SG	1	Tyreke Evans	6 ft 6 in (1.98 m)	220 lb (100 kg)	1989-09-19	Memphis
PG	2	Tim Frazier	6 ft 1 in (1.85 m)	170 lb (77 kg)	1990-11-01	Penn State
SF	15	Alonzo Gee	6 ft 6 in (1.98 m)	225 lb (102 kg)	1987-05-29	Alabama
SG	10	Eric Gordon	6 ft 4 in (1.93 m)	215 lb (98 kg)	1988-12-25	Indiana
SF	25	Jordan Hamilton	6 ft 7 in (2.01 m)	220 lb (100 kg)	1990-10-06	Texas
PG	11	Jrue Holiday	6 ft 4 in (1.93 m)	205 lb (93 kg)	1990-06-12	UCLA
C	5	Kendrick Perkins	6 ft 10 in (2.08 m)	270 lb (122 kg)	1984-11-10	Clifton J. Ozen HS (TX)
G/F	20	Quincy Pondexter	6 ft 6 in (1.98 m)	220 lb (100 kg)	1988-03-10	Washington

Coaches
Head coach
- Alvin Gentry
Assistant(s)
- Darren Erman
- Robert Pack
- Phil Weber
- Fred Vinson
- Kevin Hanson
- Duane Brooks (trainer)

Legend
- (DP) Unsigned draft pick
- (FA) Free agent
- (S) Suspended
- (DL) On assignment to D-League affiliate
- Injured

Roster
Updated: April 9, 2016

=== Roster notes ===
- Bryce Dejean-Jones died due to a gunshot wound on May 28.

== Standing ==
=== By Division ===
Southwest Division	W	L	PCT	GB	Home	Road	Div	GP
y – San Antonio Spurs	67	15	.817	–	40‍–‍1	27‍–‍14	15–1	82
x – Dallas Mavericks	42	40	.512	25.0	23‍–‍18	19‍–‍22	7–9	82
x – Memphis Grizzlies	42	40	.512	25.0	26‍–‍15	16‍–‍25	7–9	82
x – Houston Rockets	41	41	.500	26.0	23‍–‍18	18‍–‍23	8–8	82
e – New Orleans Pelicans	30	52	.366	37.0	21‍–‍20	9‍–‍32	4–12	82

=== By Conference ===
Western Conference
#	Team	W	L	PCT	GB	GP
1	z – Golden State Warriors *	73	9	.890	–	82
2	y – San Antonio Spurs *	67	15	.817	6.0	82
3	y – Oklahoma City Thunder *	55	27	.671	18.0	82
4	x – Los Angeles Clippers	53	29	.646	20.0	82
5	x – Portland Trail Blazers	44	38	.537	29.0	82
6	x – Dallas Mavericks	42	40	.512	31.0	82
7	x – Memphis Grizzlies	42	40	.512	31.0	82
8	x – Houston Rockets	41	41	.500	32.0	82
9	e – Utah Jazz	40	42	.488	33.0	82
10	e – Sacramento Kings	33	49	.402	40.0	82
11	e – Denver Nuggets	33	49	.402	40.0	82
12	e – New Orleans Pelicans	30	52	.366	43.0	82
13	e – Minnesota Timberwolves	29	53	.354	44.0	82
14	e – Phoenix Suns	23	59	.280	50.0	82
15	e – Los Angeles Lakers	17	65	.207	56.0	82

== Pre-season ==
2015 pre-season game log
Total: 3–4 (Home: 1–2; Road: 2–2)
Pre-season: 3–4 (home: 1–2; road: 2–2)

Game	Date	Team	Score	High points	High rebounds	High assists	Location Attendance	Record
1	October 3	@ Indiana	110–105	Anthony Davis (18)	Anderson, Davis (8)	Babbitt, Cole, Webster (3)	Bankers Life Fieldhouse; 13,725	1–0
2	October 9	Atlanta	93–103	Anthony Davis (20)	Kendrick Perkins (6)	Norris Cole (3)	Veterans Memorial Arena; 7,628	1–1
3	October 12	@ Chicago	123–115	Anthony Davis (26)	Ryan Anderson (10)	Luke Babbitt (4)	United Center; 21,407	2–1
4	October 17	Sacramento	98–107	Ryan Anderson (20)	Adrien, Davis (8)	Holiday, Robinson (4)	Rupp Arena; 19,183	2–2
5	October 19	@ Houston	100–120	Ryan Anderson (23)	Ryan Anderson (11)	Holiday, Robinson (5)	Toyota Center; 16,678	2–3
6	October 21	@ Orlando	107–110 OT	Anthony Davis (33)	Anthony Davis (16)	Gee, Gordon, Jones (2)	Amway Center; 12,779	2–4
7	October 23	Miami	93–90	Anthony Davis (25)	Anthony Davis (13)	Anthony Davis (5)	Smoothie King Center; 16,478	3–4

2015–16 season schedule

== Regular season game log ==
2015–16 game log
Total: 30–52 (Home: 21–20; Road: 9–32)
October: 0–3 (home: 0–1; road: 0–2)

Game	Date	Team	Score	High points	High rebounds	High assists	Location Attendance	Record
1	October 27	@ Golden State	L 95–111	Anthony Davis (18)	Anderson, Davis (6)	Ish Smith (9)	Oracle Arena; 19,596	0–1
2	October 28	@ Portland	L 94–112	Anthony Davis (25)	Anthony Davis (10)	Ish Smith (8)	Moda Center; 19,393	0–2
3	October 31	Golden State	L 120–134	Anthony Davis (26)	Anthony Davis (15)	Jrue Holiday (6)	Smoothie King Center; 18,406	0–3

November : 4–10 (home: 3–3; road: 1–7)

Game	Date	Team	Score	High points	High rebounds	High assists	Location Attendance	Record
4	November 3	Orlando	L 94–103	Eric Gordon (24)	Anthony Davis (9)	Ish Smith (7)	Smoothie King Center; 16,876	0–4
5	November 6	Atlanta	L 115–121	Anthony Davis (43)	Anthony Davis (10)	Ish Smith (11)	Smoothie King Center; 16,876	0–5
6	November 7	@ Dallas	L 98–107	Anthony Davis (25)	Ryan Anderson (9)	Ish Smith (7)	American Airlines Center; 20,454	0–6
7	November 10	Dallas	W 120–105	Ryan Anderson (25)	Ryan Anderson (7)	Ish Smith (12)	Smoothie King Center; 17,128	1–6
8	November 11	@ Atlanta	L 98–106	Eric Gordon (26)	Ryan Anderson (11)	Ish Smith (10)	Philips Arena; 15,597	1–7
9	November 13	@ Toronto	L 81–100	Eric Gordon (30)	Alexis Ajinça (9)	Ish Smith (4)	Air Canada Centre; 19,800	1–8
10	November 15	@ New York	L 87–95	Anthony Davis (36)	Anthony Davis (11)	Ish Smith (5)	Madison Square Garden; 19,812	1–9
11	November 17	Denver	L 98–115	Ryan Anderson (21)	Luke Babbitt (7)	Ish Smith (8)	Smoothie King Center; 17,269	1–10
12	November 18	@ Oklahoma City	L 103–110	Ryan Anderson (30)	Alexis Ajinca (10)	Ish Smith (6)	Chesapeake Energy Arena; 18,203	1–11
13	November 20	San Antonio	W 104–90	Ryan Anderson (30)	Anthony Davis (18)	Ish Smith (13)	Smoothie King Center; 16,698	2–11
14	November 22	Phoenix	W 122–116	Anthony Davis (32)	Anthony Davis (19)	Ish Smith (8)	Smoothie King Center; 16,698	3–11
15	November 25	@ Phoenix	W 120–114	Anthony Davis (26)	Anthony Davis (17)	Ish Smith (11)	Talking Stick Resort Arena; 16,338	4–11
16	November 27	@ L. A. Clippers	L 90–111	Anthony Davis (17)	Ömer Aşık (10)	Ish Smith (10)	Talking Stick Resort Arena; 16,338	4–12
17	November 28	@ Utah	L 87–101	Anthony Davis (36)	Anthony Davis (11)	Ish Smith (6)	Vivint Smart Home Arena; 19,911	4–13

December : 6–9 (home: 4–3; road: 2–6)

Game	Date	Team	Score	High points	High rebounds	High assists	Location Attendance	Record
18	December 1	Memphis	L 104–113	Tyreke Evans (20)	Anthony Davis (14)	Tyreke Evans (10)	Smoothie King Center; 16,698	4–14
19	December 2	@ Houston	L 101–108	Anthony Davis (29)	Anthony Davis (13)	Tyreke Evans (8)	Toyota Center; 17,339	4–15
20	December 4	Cleveland	W 114–108 (OT)	Anthony Davis (31)	Anthony Davis (12)	Tyreke Evans (10)	Smoothie King Center; 17,906	5–15
21	December 7	Boston	L 93–111	Ryan Anderson (18)	Anderson, Ajinca (9)	Jrue Holiday (6)	Smoothie King Center; 15,715	5–16
22	December 11	Washington	W 107–105	Tyreke Evans (27)	Anthony Davis (11)	Jrue Holiday (6)	Smoothie King Center; 16,875	6–16
23	December 12	@ Chicago	L 94–98	Tyreke Evans (22)	Anthony Davis (13)	Tyreke Evans (6)	United Center; 21,605	6–17
24	December 14	@ Portland	L 101–105	Anthony Davis (28)	Tyreke Evans (12)	Tyreke Evans (5)	Moda Center; 19,231	6–18
25	December 16	@ Utah	W 104–94	Ryan Anderson (24)	Anthony Davis (13)	Tyreke Evans (5)	Vivint Smart Home Arena; 17,899	7–18
26	December 18	@ Phoenix	L 88–104	Anthony Davis (16)	Anthony Davis (12)	Jrue Holiday (4)	Talking Stick Resort Arena; 17,227	7–19
27	December 20	@ Denver	W 130–125	Anthony Davis (27)	Tyreke Evans (8)	Tyreke Evans (10)	Pepsi Center; 13,857	8–19
28	December 23	Portland	W 115–89	Anthony Davis (28)	Anthony Davis (12)	Tyreke Evans (9)	Smoothie King Center; 16,886	9–19
29	December 25	@ Miami	L 88–94 (OT)	Anthony Davis (29)	Anthony Davis (15)	Tyreke Evans (7)	AmericanAirlines; 19,845	9–20
30	December 26	Houston	W 110–108	Anthony Davis (24)	Anthony Davis (13)	Tyreke Evans (13)	Smoothie King Center; 18,248	10–20
31	December 28	Orlando	L 89–104	Anthony Davis (20)	Cole, Davis (8)	Tyreke Evans (8)	Amway Center; 17,606	10–21
32	December 31	L. A. Clippers	L 89–95	Ryan Anderson (17)	Anthony Davis (15)	Tyreke Evans (9)	Smoothie King Center; 16,920	10–22

January : 8–6 (home: 6–3; road: 2–3)

Game	Date	Team	Score	High points	High rebounds	High assists	Location Attendance	Record
33	January 2	@ Dallas	W 105–98	Anthony Davis (31)	Anthony Davis (14)	Jrue Holiday (5)	American Airlines Center; 20,152	11–22
34	January 6	Dallas	L 91–100	Anthony Davis (26)	Anthony Davis (12)	Anthony Davis (7)	CenturyLink Center; 15,255	11–23
35	January 8	Indiana	L 86–91	Tyreke Evans (27)	Alexis Ajinça (10)	Tyreke Evans (5)	CenturyLink Center; 16,895	11–24
36	January 10	@ L. A. Clippers	L 111–114 (OT)	Tyreke Evans (27)	Aşık, Holiday (11)	Tyreke Evans (7)	STAPLES Center; 19,060	11–25
37	January 12	@ L. A. Lakers	L 91–95	Tyreke Evans (21)	Ömer Aşık (13)	Cole, Evans, Holiday (4)	Staples Center; 18,997	11–26
38	January 13	@ Sacramento	W 109–97	Davis, Gordon (24)	Ömer Aşık (13)	Jrue Holiday (10)	Sleep Train Arena; 18,997	12–26
39	January 15	Charlotte	W 109–107	Ryan Anderson (32)	Alonzo Gee (9)	Jrue Holiday (10)	Smoothie King Center; 16,876	13–26
40	January 18	@ Memphis	L 99–101	Jrue Holiday (23)	Anthony Davis (8)	Jrue Holiday (9)	FedEx Forum; 18,119	13–27
41	January 19	Minnesota	W 114–99	Anthony Davis (35)	Ömer Aşık (8)	Jrue Holiday (9)	Smoothie King Center; 14,255	14–27
42	January 21	Detroit	W 115–99	Anthony Davis (32)	Alonzo Gee (9)	Tyreke Evans (10)	Smoothie King Center; 15,281	15–27
43	January 23	Milwaukee	W 116–99	Ryan Anderson (23)	Ömer Aşık (8)	Jrue Holiday (9)	Smoothie King Center; 16,980	16–27
44	January 25	Houston	L 111–112	Jrue Holiday (32)	Alonzo Gee (10)	Jrue Holiday (9)	Smoothie King Center; 15,688	16–28
45	January 28	Sacramento	W 114–105	Ryan Anderson (36)	Ömer Aşık (13)	Norris Cole (10)	Smoothie King Center; 15,636	17–28
46	January 30	Brooklyn	W 105–103	Jrue Holiday (26)	Anthony Davis (16)	Jrue Holiday (7)	Smoothie King Center; 18,037	18–28

February : 5–7 (home: 3–3; road: 2–4)

Game	Date	Team	Score	High points	High rebounds	High assists	Location Attendance	Record
47	February 1	Memphis	L 95–110	Cole, Davis (23)	Anthony Davis (9)	Norris Cole (6)	Smoothie King Center; 15,210	18–29
48	February 3	@ San Antonio	L 97–110	Anthony Davis (28)	Ömer Aşık (11)	Norris Cole (9)	AT&T Center; 18,418	18–30
49	February 4	L. A. Lakers	L 96–99	Anthony Davis (39)	Anthony Davis (11)	Jrue Holiday (9)	Smoothie King Center; 18,420	18–31
50	February 6	@ Cleveland	L 84–99	Norris Cole (26)	Ömer Aşık (12)	Norris Cole (5)	Quicken Loans Arena; 20,562	18–32
51	February 8	@ Minnesota	W 116–102	Anthony Davis (27)	Aşık, Davis (8)	Norris Cole (6)	Target Center; 11,926	19–32
52	February 10	Utah	W 100–96	Jrue Holiday (21)	Alexis Ajinca (11)	Jrue Holiday (9)	Smoothie King Center; 15,256	20–32
53	February 11	@ Oklahoma City	L 95–121	Davis, Holiday (23)	Anderson, Cole (5)	Norris Cole (6)	Chesapeake Energy Arena; 18,203	20–33
All-Star Break
54	February 19	Philadelphia	W 121–114	Davis, Holiday (34)	Ömer Aşık (14)	Jrue Holiday (12)	Smoothie King Center; 16,953	21–33
55	February 21	@ Detroit	W 111–106	Anthony Davis (59)	Anthony Davis (20)	Jrue Holiday (9)	Palace of Auburn Hills; 17,886	22–33
56	February 23	@ Washington	L 89–109	Jrue Holiday (20)	Anthony Davis (20)	Jrue Holiday (7)	Verizon Center; 15,743	22–34
57	February 25	Oklahoma City	W 123–119	Anthony Davis (30)	Alexis Ajinca (7)	Jrue Holiday (9)	Smoothie King Center; 16,974	23–34
58	February 27	Minnesota	L 110–112	Anderson, Gordon (31)	Ryan Anderson (14)	Jrue Holiday (8)	Smoothie King Center; 17,338	23–35

March : 5–12 (home: 4–5; road: 1–7)

Game	Date	Team	Score	High points	High rebounds	High assists	Location Attendance	Record
59	March 2	@ Houston	L 95–100	Norris Cole (21)	Ryan Anderson (10)	Cole, Holiday (8)	Toyota Center; 18,226	23–36
60	March 3	San Antonio	L 86–94	Eric Gordon (23)	Anthony Davis (13)	Jrue Holiday (7)	Smoothie King Center; 17,781	23–37
61	March 5	Utah	L 94–106	Anthony Davis (29)	Anthony Davis (11)	Jrue Holiday (7)	Smoothie King Center; 16,680	23–38
62	March 7	Sacramento	W 115–112	Anthony Davis (31)	Anthony Davis (10)	Jrue Holiday (10)	Smoothie King Center; 16,403	24–38
63	March 9	@ Charlotte	L 113–122	Anthony Davis (40)	Anthony Davis (13)	Jrue Holiday (6)	Time Warner Cable Arena; 16,335	24–39
64	March 11	@ Memphis	L 114–121 (OT)	Jrue Holiday (34)	Anthony Davis (13)	Jrue Holiday (10)	FedExForum; 18,119	24–40
65	March 12	@ Milwaukee	L 92–103	Anthony Davis (29)	Anthony Davis (11)	Douglas, Gee, Holiday (4)	BMO Harris Bradley Center; 16,518	24–41
66	March 14	@ Golden State	L 107–125	Davis, Douglas (22)	Anthony Davis (11)	Toney Douglas (6)	Oracle Arena; 19,596	24–42
67	March 16	@ Sacramento	W 123–108	Ryan Anderson (29)	Anthony Davis (14)	Tim Frazier (9)	Sleep Train Arena; 17,086	25–42
68	March 18	Portland	L 112–117	Anderson, Holiday (30)	Dante Cunningham (7)	Douglas, Holiday (6)	Smoothie King Center; 17,263	25–43
69	March 20	L. A. Clippers	W 109–105	Jrue Holiday (22)	Ömer Aşık (10)	Jrue Holiday (8)	Smoothie King Center; 17,407	26–43
70	March 22	Miami	L 99–113	Jrue Holiday (24)	Aşık, Douglas (9)	Jrue Holiday (7)	Smoothie King Center; 16,867	26–44
71	March 24	@ Indiana	L 84–92	Alexis Ajinca (22)	Ömer Aşık (15)	Tim Frazier (5)	Bankers Life Fieldhouse; 17,517	26–45
72	March 26	Toronto	L 91–115	Alonzo Gee (18)	Alonzo Gee (8)	Tim Frazier (6)	Smoothie King Center; 17,009	26–46
73	March 28	New York	W 99–91	Jrue Holiday (22)	Kendrick Perkins (8)	Jrue Holiday (6)	Smoothie King Center; 17,000	27–46
74	March 30	@ San Antonio	L 92–100	Alexis Ajinca (18)	Alexis Ajinca (9)	Tim Frazier (7)	AT&T Center; 18,418	27–47
75	March 31	Denver	W 101–95	Luke Babbitt (22)	Luke Babbitt (10)	Toney Douglas (10)	Smoothie King Center; 16,269	28–47

April : 2–5 (home: 1–2; road: 1–3)

Game	Date	Team	Score	High points	High rebounds	High assists	Location Attendance	Record
76	April 3	@ Brooklyn	W 106–87	Luke Babbitt (21)	Jordan Hamilton (11)	Toney Douglas (13)	Barclays Center; 16,329	29–47
77	April 5	@ Philadelphia	L 93–107	Dante Cunningham (19)	Alexis Ajinca (10)	Tim Frazier (9)	Wells Fargo Center; 10,978	29–48
78	April 6	@ Boston	L 97–104	Toney Douglas (19)	Alexis Ajinca (8)	Tim Frazier (6)	TD Garden; 18,624	29–49
79	April 8	L. A. Lakers	W 110–102	Alexis Ajinca (28)	Alexis Ajinca (15)	Tim Frazier (12)	Smoothie King Center; 18,607	30–49
80	April 9	Phoenix	L 100–121	Toney Douglas (19)	Luke Babbitt (9)	Tim Frazier (7)	Smoothie King Center; 16,932	30–50
81	April 11	Chicago	L 116–121	James Ennis (29)	Ömer Aşık (7)	Tim Frazier (11)	Smoothie King Center; 16,867	30–51
82	April 13	@ Minnesota	L 109–144	James Ennis (28)	Ömer Aşık (11)	Tim Frazier (15)	Target Center; 14,889	30–52

2015–16 season schedule

== Player statistics ==
Legend
GP	Games played	GS	Games started	MPG	Minutes per game
FG%	Field-goal percentage	3P%	3-point field-goal percentage	FT%	Free-throw percentage
RPG	Rebounds per game	APG	Assists per game	SPG	Steals per game
BPG	Blocks per game	PPG	Points per game

=== Regular season ===
New Orleans Pelicans statistics
Player	GP	GS	MPG	FG%	3P%	FT%	RPG	APG	SPG	BPG	PPG
Dante Cunningham	80	46	24.6	.451	.316	.695	3.0	1.0	.5	.4	6.1
Alonzo Gee	73	38	22.4	.518	.283	.667	3.4	1.0	.9	.2	4.5
Ömer Aşık	68	64	17.3	.533		.545	6.1	.4	.3	.3	4.0
Ryan Anderson	66	7	30.4	.427	.366	.873	6.0	1.1	.6	.4	17.0
Jrue Holiday	65	23	28.2	.439	.336	.843	3.0	6.0	1.4	.3	16.8
Anthony Davis	61	61	35.5	.493	.324	.758	10.3	1.9	1.3	2.0	24.3
Toney Douglas	61	18	20.7	.411	.399	.848	2.3	2.6	1.1	.1	8.7
Alexis Ajinça	59	17	14.6	.476	.000	.839	4.6	.5	.3	.6	6.0
Luke Babbitt	47	13	18.0	.422	.404	.780	3.1	1.1	.2	.1	7.0
Eric Gordon	45	44	32.9	.418	.384	.888	2.2	2.7	1.0	.3	15.2
Norris Cole	45	23	26.6	.405	.324	.800	3.4	3.7	.8	.1	10.6
Kendrick Perkins	37	5	14.6	.533		.440	3.5	.8	.3	.3	2.5
Ish Smith^{†}	27	3	22.9	.430	.303	.767	3.4	5.7	.9	.2	8.9
Tyreke Evans	25	25	30.6	.433	.388	.796	5.2	6.6	1.3	.3	15.2
Tim Frazier^{†}	16	1	29.3	.450	.419	.763	4.4	7.5	1.4	.1	13.1
Bryce Dejean-Jones	14	11	19.9	.406	.375	.524	3.4	1.1	.7	.1	5.6
Jordan Hamilton	11	4	27.6	.422	.289	.667	5.6	2.3	.7	.3	11.4
James Ennis III^{†}	9	5	31.3	.500	.480	.792	3.9	2.0	1.3	.3	15.9
Orlando Johnson^{†}	5	1	10.8	.235	.200	.500	1.2	.4	.2	.0	2.0
Jimmer Fredette^{†}	4	0	3.3	.250	.000		.0	.3	.3	.0	.5
Nate Robinson	2	1	11.5	.000	.000		.0	2.0	.5	.0	.0

- ^{†} Denotes player spent time with another team in the season. Stats reflect time with the Pelicans only.
