= 2015–16 Indiana Pacers season =

NBA professional basketball team season

- Head coach: Frank Vogel
- General manager: Kevin Pritchard
- Owners: Herb Simon
- Arena: Bankers Life Fieldhouse

Results
- Record: 45–37 (.549)
- Place: Division: 2nd (Central); Conference: 7th (Eastern)
- Playoff finish: First Round (lost to Raptors 3–4)
- Stats at Basketball Reference

Local media
- Television: Fox Sports Indiana
- Radio: 1070 The Fan

The 2015–16 Indiana Pacers season was Indiana's 49th season as a franchise and 40th season in the National Basketball Association (NBA). It was also the team's sixth and final season under head coach, Frank Vogel.

With a healthy Paul George returning to form, the Pacers clinched a playoff spot after defeating the Brooklyn Nets on April 10. The victory eliminated the Chicago Bulls from playoff contention. The Pacers finished the regular season with a record of 45–37, earning them the seventh seed in the East. They were matched up against the second seeded Toronto Raptors in the first round, but were eliminated in a decisive seven-game series at the end.

For the first time since 2007–08, Roy Hibbert was not on the roster as he was traded to the Los Angeles Lakers on July 9, 2015.

== 2015 NBA draft ==
Round	Pick	Player	Position	Nationality	School/club team
1	11	Myles Turner	Center	United States	Texas
2	43	Joe Young	Point guard	United States	Oregon

== Roster ==
2015–16 Indiana Pacers roster
Players

Pos.	No.	Player	Height	Weight	DOB	From
F	5	Lavoy Allen	6 ft 9 in (2.06 m)	255 lb (116 kg)	1989–02–04	Temple
F	25	Rakeem Christmas	6 ft 9 in (2.06 m)	250 lb (113 kg)	1991–12–01	Syracuse
G	11	Monta Ellis	6 ft 3 in (1.91 m)	185 lb (84 kg)	1985–10–26	Lanier HS (MS)
F	13	Paul George	6 ft 9 in (2.06 m)	220 lb (100 kg)	1990–05–02	Fresno State
G	3	George Hill	6 ft 3 in (1.91 m)	188 lb (85 kg)	1986–05–04	IUPUI
F	27	Jordan Hill	6 ft 10 in (2.08 m)	235 lb (107 kg)	1987–07–27	Arizona
F	44	Solomon Hill	6 ft 7 in (2.01 m)	225 lb (102 kg)	1991–03–18	Arizona
G	10	Ty Lawson	5 ft 11 in (1.80 m)	195 lb (88 kg)	1987–11–03	North Carolina
C	28	Ian Mahinmi	6 ft 11 in (2.11 m)	250 lb (113 kg)	1986–11–05	France
F	0	C. J. Miles	6 ft 6 in (1.98 m)	231 lb (105 kg)	1987–03–18	Skyline HS (TX)
F	40	Glenn Robinson III	6 ft 7 in (2.01 m)	222 lb (101 kg)	1994–01–08	Michigan
G	2	Rodney Stuckey	6 ft 5 in (1.96 m)	205 lb (93 kg)	1986–04–21	Eastern Washington
C	33	Myles Turner	7 ft 0 in (2.13 m)	255 lb (116 kg)	1996–03–24	Texas
C	42	Shayne Whittington	7 ft 2 in (2.18 m)	250 lb (113 kg)	1991–03–27	Western Michigan
G	1	Joe Young	6 ft 2 in (1.88 m)	180 lb (82 kg)	1992–06–27	Oregon

Coaches
Head coach
- Frank Vogel
Assistant(s)
- Dan Burke
- Popeye Jones
- Nate McMillan

Legend
- (DP) Unsigned draft pick
- (FA) Free agent
- (S) Suspended
- (DL) On assignment to D-League affiliate
- Injured

Roster
Updated: 2016–04–04

== Standing ==
Central Division	W	L	PCT	GB	Home	Road	Div	GP
c – Cleveland Cavaliers	57	25	.695	–	33‍–‍8	24‍–‍17	8–8	82
x – Indiana Pacers	45	37	.549	12.0	26‍–‍15	19‍–‍22	8–8	82
x – Detroit Pistons	44	38	.537	13.0	26‍–‍15	18‍–‍23	10–6	82
e – Chicago Bulls	42	40	.512	15.0	26‍–‍15	16‍–‍25	10–6	82
e – Milwaukee Bucks	33	49	.402	24.0	23‍–‍18	10‍–‍31	4–12	82

Eastern Conference
#	Team	W	L	PCT	GB	GP
1	c – Cleveland Cavaliers *	57	25	.695	–	82
2	y – Toronto Raptors *	56	26	.683	1.0	82
3	y – Miami Heat *	48	34	.585	9.0	82
4	x – Atlanta Hawks	48	34	.585	9.0	82
5	x – Boston Celtics	48	34	.585	9.0	82
6	x – Charlotte Hornets	48	34	.585	9.0	82
7	x – Indiana Pacers	45	37	.549	12.0	82
8	x – Detroit Pistons	44	38	.537	13.0	82
9	e – Chicago Bulls	42	40	.512	15.0	82
10	e – Washington Wizards	41	41	.500	16.0	82
11	e – Orlando Magic	35	47	.427	22.0	82
12	e – Milwaukee Bucks	33	49	.402	24.0	82
13	e – New York Knicks	32	50	.390	25.0	82
14	e – Brooklyn Nets	21	61	.256	36.0	82
15	e – Philadelphia 76ers	10	72	.122	47.0	82

== Game log ==
=== Preseason ===
2015 pre-season game log
Total: 5–2 (home: 3–1; road: 2–1)
Pre-season: 5–2 (home: 3–1; road: 2–1)

Game	Date	Team	Score	High points	High rebounds	High assists	Location Attendance	Record
1	October 3	New Orleans	105–110	Paul George (18)	Lavoy Allen (8)	Robinson III, Stuckey (4)	Bankers Life Fieldhouse; 13,725	0–1
2	October 6	@ Detroit	115–112	Paul George (32)	Shayne Whittington (8)	George Hill (8)	The Palace of Auburn Hills; 10,446	1–1
3	October 8	Orlando	97–92	Miles, Robinson (14)	Ian Mahinmi (9)	Monta Ellis (7)	Gainbridge Fieldhouse; 13,475	2–1
4	October 13	Detroit	101–97	Toney Douglas (15)	Lavoy Allen (6)	Toney Douglas (3)	Bankers Life Fieldhouse; 12,730	3–1
5	October 15	@ Cleveland	107–85	Paul George (17)	Paul George (8)	Joe Young (6)	Quicken Loans Arena; 18,774	4–1
6	October 20	@ Chicago	94–103	Paul George (26)	Paul George (13)	Ellis, Hill, Stuckey (3)	United Center; 21,512	4–2
7	October 22	Charlotte	98–86	C. J. Miles (20)	Lavoy Allen (10)	George Hill (5)	Allen County War Memorial Coliseum; 10,744	5–2

2015–16 season schedule

=== Regular season ===
2015–16 game log
Total: 45–37 (home: 26–15; road: 19–22)
October: 0–3 (home: 0–2; road: 0–1)

Game	Date	Team	Score	High points	High rebounds	High assists	Location Attendance	Record
1	October 28	@ Toronto	L 99–106	George Hill (19)	Paul George (12)	Paul George (8)	Air Canada Centre; 19,800	0–1
2	October 29	Memphis	L 103–112	George Hill (20)	Ian Mahinmi (9)	George, Stuckey (5)	Bankers Life Fieldhouse; 18,165	0–2
3	October 31	Utah	L 76–97	George Hill (17)	George Hill (6)	Monta Ellis (3)	Bankers Life Fieldhouse; 14,412	0–3

November : 11–2 (home: 6–0; road: 5–2)

Game	Date	Team	Score	High points	High rebounds	High assists	Location Attendance	Record
4	November 3	@ Detroit	W 94–82	Rodney Stuckey (23)	Paul George (9)	George, Hill (6)	The Palace of Auburn Hills; 14,412	1–3
5	November 4	Boston	W 100–98	Paul George (26)	Lavoy Allen (11)	Monta Ellis (8)	Bankers Life Fieldhouse; 14,022	2–3
6	November 6	Miami	W 90–87	Paul George (36)	Paul George (12)	Monta Ellis (8)	Bankers Life Fieldhouse; 16,914	3–3
7	November 8	@ Cleveland	L 97–101	Paul George (32)	George, Hill (11)	Paul George (6)	Quicken Loans Arena; 20,562	3–4
8	November 9	Orlando	W 97–84	Paul George (27)	Ian Mahinmi (9)	Paul George (7)	Bankers Life Fieldhouse; 13,104	4–4
9	November 11	@ Boston	W 102–91	Paul George (26)	Paul George (10)	Monta Ellis (6)	TD Garden; 17,879	5–4
10	November 13	Minnesota	W 107–103	Paul George (29)	George, Mahinmi (9)	Ellis, Budinger (5)	Bankers Life Fieldhouse; 16,797	6–4
11	November 16	@ Chicago	L 95–96	Paul George (26)	Ian Mahinmi (12)	Monta Ellis (6)	United Center; 21,660	6–5
12	November 18	@ Philadelphia	W 112–85	Paul George (34)	Paul George (8)	Monta Ellis (9)	Wells Fargo Center; 11,080	7–5
13	November 21	Milwaukee	W 123–86	C. J. Miles (21)	Jordan Hill (11)	Paul George (7)	Bankers Life Fieldhouse; 17,137	8–5
14	November 24	@ Washington	W 123–106	Paul George (40)	Ian Mahinmi (9)	Ellis, Hill (5)	Verizon Center; 15,486	9–5
15	November 27	Chicago	W 104–92	Paul George (33)	George Hill (10)	Monta Ellis (5)	Bankers Life Fieldhouse; 18,165	10–5
16	November 29	@ L. A. Lakers	W 107–103	Paul George (39)	Hill, Mahinmi (10)	Monta Ellis (6)	STAPLES Center; 18,997	11–5

December : 7–9 (home: 5–3; road: 2–6)

Game	Date	Team	Score	High points	High rebounds	High assists	Location Attendance	Record
17	December 2	@ L. A. Clippers	W 103–91	Paul George (31)	Paul George (10)	Paul George (4)	STAPLES Center; 19,060	12–5
18	December 3	@ Portland	L 111–123	C. J. Miles (27)	Ian Mahinmi (11)	Rodney Stuckey (6)	Moda Center; 19,060	12–6
19	December 5	@ Utah	L 119–122 (OT)	Paul George (48)	Allen, George, Hill (8)	George Hill (5)	Vivint Smart Home Arena; 19,500	12–7
20	December 8	Golden State	L 123–131	Paul George (33)	Solomon Hill (9)	Paul George (6)	Bankers Life Fieldhouse; 18,165	12–8
21	December 11	Miami	W 96–83	Paul George (23)	Ian Mahinmi (12)	Monta Ellis (6)	Bankers Life Fieldhouse; 16,184	13–8
22	December 12	@ Detroit	L 96–118	George Hill (14)	George Hill (7)	George Hill (8)	The Palace of Auburn Hills; 14,858	13–9
23	December 14	Toronto	W 106–90	Jordan Hill (20)	Jordan Hill (13)	Lavoy Allen (4)	Bankers Life Fieldhouse; 16,598	14–9
24	December 16	Dallas	W 107–81	C. J. Miles (20)	Ian Mahinmi (10)	Rodney Stuckey (7)	Bankers Life Fieldhouse; 14,824	15–9
25	December 18	Brooklyn	W 104–97	Paul George (23)	Jordan Hill (11)	Monta Ellis (5)	Bankers Life Fieldhouse; 16,548	16–9
26	December 19	@ Memphis	L 84–96	Paul George (29)	Jordan Hill (13)	Allen, George, Hill, Stuckey (2)	FedExForum; 18,119	16–10
27	December 21	@ San Antonio	L 92–106	Rodney Stuckey (16)	Ian Mahinmi (11)	Ellis, George (6)	AT&T Center; 18,418	16–11
28	December 23	Sacramento	L 106–108	Monta Ellis (21)	Paul George (10)	Monta Ellis (6)	Bankers Life Fieldhouse; 18,165	16–12
29	December 26	@ Minnesota	W 102–88	Monta Ellis (22)	Ian Mahinmi (6)	Rodney Stuckey (8)	Target Center; 15,076	17–12
30	December 28	Atlanta	W 93–87	Monta Ellis (26)	Ian Mahinmi (9)	Paul George (3)	Bankers Life Fieldhouse; 18,165	18–12
31	December 30	@ Chicago	L 100–102 (OT)	Jordan Hill (20)	Lavoy Allen (12)	Monta Ellis (5)	United Center; 22,206	18–13
32	December 31	Milwaukee	L 116–120	Paul George (31)	Myles Turner (9)	Monta Ellis (7)	Bankers Life Fieldhouse; 16,348	18–14

January : 7–8 (home: 4–2; road: 3–6)

Game	Date	Team	Score	High points	High rebounds	High assists	Location Attendance	Record
33	January 2	Detroit	W 94–82	Paul George (32)	Paul George (14)	Ellis, George (3)	Bankers Life Fieldhouse; 18,165	19–14
34	January 4	@ Miami	L 100–103 (OT)	Paul George (32)	Jordan Hill (12)	Monta Ellis (9)	American Airlines Arena; 19,874	19–15
35	January 6	@ Orlando	W 95–86	Paul George (20)	Ian Mahinmi (12)	Monta Ellis (7)	Amway Center; 18,846	20–15
36	January 8	@ New Orleans	W 91–86	Ian Mahinmi (17)	Ian Mahinmi (10)	Monta Ellis (8)	CenturyLink Center; 16,895	21–15
37	January 10	@ Houston	L 103–107 (OT)	Paul George (20)	Ian Mahinmi (7)	Monta Ellis (13)	Toyota Center; 18,133	21–16
38	January 12	Phoenix	W 116–97	Paul George (21)	C. J. Miles (8)	Monta Ellis (7)	Bankers Life Fieldhouse; 15,284	22–16
39	January 13	@ Boston	L 94–103	Paul George (23)	Ian Mahinmi (10)	Ellis, George (4)	TD Garden; 18,624	22–17
40	January 15	Washington	L 104–118	Paul George (21)	George Hill (8)	Paul George (7)	Bankers Life Fieldhouse; 18,165	22–18
41	January 17	@ Denver	L 126–129	Myles Turner (25)	Myles Turner (7)	Joe Young (7)	Pepsi Center; 11,104	22–19
42	January 19	@ Phoenix	W 97–94	Monta Ellis (20)	Paul George (8)	Joe Young (5)	Talking Stick Resort Arena; 16,802	23–19
43	January 22	@ Golden State	L 110–122	Myles Turner (31)	Myles Turner (8)	Joe Young (8)	Oracle Arena; 19,596	23–20
44	January 23	Sacramento	L 97–108	Paul George (34)	Jordan Hill (13)	Monta Ellis (7)	Sleep Train Arena; 17,419	23–21
45	January 26	L. A. Clippers	L 89–91	Paul George (31)	Paul George (11)	Monta Ellis (5)	Bankers Life Fieldhouse; 15,448	23–22
46	January 28	Atlanta	W 111–92	Monta Ellis (25)	Lavoy Allen (12)	Monta Ellis (6)	Bankers Life Fieldhouse; 15,196	24–22
47	January 30	Denver	W 109–105 (OT)	Monta Ellis (32)	Myles Turner (9)	Paul George (7)	Bankers Life Fieldhouse; 18,165	25–22

February : 6–7 (home: 4–4; road: 2–3)

Game	Date	Team	Score	High points	High rebounds	High assists	Location Attendance	Record
48	February 1	Cleveland	L 106–111 (OT)	George Hill (23)	Myles Turner (10)	Paul George (8)	Bankers Life Fieldhouse; 17,283	25–23
49	February 3	@ Brooklyn	W 114–100	C. J. Miles (27)	Lavoy Allen (8)	Paul George (6)	Barclays Center; 13,311	26–23
50	February 5	@ Atlanta	L 96–102	Paul George (31)	Lavoy Allen (14)	George Hill (8)	Philips Arena; 17,225	26–24
51	February 6	Detroit	W 112–104	Paul George (30)	George, Hill (8)	Monta Ellis (5)	Bankers Life Fieldhouse; 18,165	27–24
52	February 8	L. A. Lakers	W 89–87	Paul George (21)	Myles Turner (13)	George Hill (6)	Bankers Life Fieldhouse; 18,165	28–24
53	February 10	Charlotte	L 95–117	Paul George (22)	George, Mahinmi (8)	Paul George (6)	Bankers Life Fieldhouse; 15,653	28–25
All-Star Break
54	February 19	@ Oklahoma City	W 101–98	Monta Ellis (27)	Hill, Mahinmi (11)	George Hill (9)	Chesapeake Energy Arena; 18,203	29–25
55	February 21	@ Orlando	W 105–102	Monta Ellis (21)	Ian Mahinmi (9)	George Hill (7)	Amway Center; 17,242	30–25
56	February 22	@ Miami	L 93–101 (OT)	Paul George (31)	Paul George (11)	Paul George (4)	American Airlines Arena; 19,600	30–26
57	February 24	New York	W 108–105	Paul George (27)	Monta Ellis (8)	Monta Ellis (7)	Bankers Life Fieldhouse; 16,018	31–26
58	February 26	Charlotte	L 95–96	Paul George (32)	Ian Mahinmi (9)	George Hill (7)	Bankers Life Fieldhouse; 18,165	31–27
59	February 28	Portland	L 102–111	Monta Ellis (18)	Myles Turner (8)	Ellis, Hill (5)	Bankers Life Fieldhouse; 16,662	31–28
60	February 29	@ Cleveland	L 96–100	Monta Ellis (28)	Paul George (8)	George, Stuckey (6)	Quicken Loans Arena; 20,562	31–29

March : 8–7 (home: 5–4; road: 3–3)

Game	Date	Team	Score	High points	High rebounds	High assists	Location Attendance	Record
61	March 2	@ Milwaukee	W 104–99	George Hill (19)	Paul George (10)	Monta Ellis (6)	BMO Harris Bradley Center; 14,263	32–29
62	March 4	@ Charlotte	L 101–108	Paul George (35)	Ian Mahinmi (14)	Paul George (7)	Time Warner Cable Arena; 19,099	32–30
63	March 5	@ Washington	W 100–99	Paul George (38)	Jordan Hill (9)	George Hill (5)	Verizon Center; 20,356	33–30
64	March 7	San Antonio	W 99–91	Monta Ellis (26)	Hill, Turner (10)	George Hill (5)	Bankers Life Fieldhouse; 16,742	34–30
65	March 12	@ Dallas	W 112–105	Paul George (20)	Paul George (10)	Monta Ellis (7)	American Airlines Center; 20,459	35–30
66	March 13	@ Atlanta	L 75–104	Myles Turner (19)	Ian Mahinmi (7)	Paul George (6)	Philips Arena; 17,066	35–31
67	March 15	Boston	W 103–98	Paul George (26)	Allen, Ellis, George (7)	Monta Ellis (6)	Bankers Life Fieldhouse; 17,118	36–31
68	March 17	Toronto	L 94–101 (OT)	George, Hill (18)	George, Turner (9)	Monta Ellis (7)	Bankers Life Fieldhouse; 15,104	36–32
69	March 19	Oklahoma City	L 111–115	Paul George (45)	Myles Turner (8)	George Hill (9)	Bankers Life Fieldhouse; 18,165	36–33
70	March 21	Philadelphia	W 91–75	Paul George (15)	Ian Mahinmi (10)	Monta Ellis (5)	Bankers Life Fieldhouse; 16,155	37–33
71	March 24	New Orleans	W 92–84	Myles Turner (24)	Myles Turner (16)	George Hill (8)	Bankers Life Fieldhouse; 17,517	38–33
72	March 26	@ Brooklyn	L 110–120	Paul George (27)	Jordan Hill (6)	Monta Ellis (6)	Barclays Center; 16,625	38–34
73	March 27	Houston	W 104–101	Paul George (25)	George, Mahinmi (11)	Monta Ellis (7)	Bankers Life Fieldhouse; 17,165	39–34
74	March 29	Chicago	L 96–98	Paul George (20)	Paul George (9)	Paul George (5)	Bankers Life Fieldhouse; 17,050	39–35
75	March 31	Orlando	L 94–114	Paul George (27)	Lavoy Allen (11)	Ian Mahinmi (3)	Bankers Life Fieldhouse; 17,234	39–36

April : 6–1 (home: 3–0; road: 3–1)

Game	Date	Team	Score	High points	High rebounds	High assists	Location Attendance	Record
76	April 2	@ Philadelphia	W 115–102	C. J. Miles (25)	Ian Mahinmi (12)	Paul George (7)	Wells Fargo Center; 19,213	40–36
77	April 3	@ New York	W 92–87	Paul George (20)	Paul George (9)	Ty Lawson (5)	Madison Square Garden; 19,812	41–36
78	April 6	Cleveland	W 123–109	Paul George (29)	Ian Mahinmi (8)	Monta Ellis (8)	Bankers Life Fieldhouse; 18,165	42–36
79	April 8	@ Toronto	L 98–111	Monta Ellis (17)	Lavoy Allen (8)	Ty Lawson (5)	Air Canada Centre; 19,800	42–37
80	April 10	Brooklyn	W 129–105	Myles Turner (28)	Solomon Hill (12)	Ty Lawson (9)	Bankers Life Fieldhouse; 18,165	43–37
81	April 12	New York	W 102–90	George, Hill (19)	Solomon Hill (11)	Ty Lawson (8)	Bankers Life Fieldhouse; 17,906	44–37
82	April 13	@ Milwaukee	W 97–92	Solomon Hill (25)	Jordan Hill (11)	Joe Young (7)	BMO Harris Bradley Center; 16,569	45–37

2015–16 season schedule

== Playoffs ==
=== Game log ===
2016 playoff game log
Total: 3–4 (home: 2–1; road: 1–3)
First Round: 3–4 (home: 2–1; road: 1–3)

Game	Date	Team	Score	High points	High rebounds	High assists	Location Attendance	Series
1	April 16	@ Toronto	W 100–90	Paul George (33)	Allen, Miles (7)	Paul George (6)	Air Canada Centre; 19,800	1–0
2	April 18	@ Toronto	L 87–98	Paul George (28)	Solomon Hill (6)	Ellis, Lawson (3)	Air Canada Centre; 19,800	1–1
3	April 21	Toronto	L 85–101	Paul George (25)	Paul George (10)	Paul George (6)	Bankers Life Fieldhouse; 18,165	1–2
4	April 23	Toronto	W 100–83	Hill, Mahinmi (22)	Ian Mahinmi (10)	Ian Mahinmi (5)	Bankers Life Fieldhouse; 18,165	2–2
5	April 26	@ Toronto	L 99–102	Paul George (39)	George, Turner (10)	Paul George (8)	Air Canada Centre; 19,800	2–3
6	April 29	Toronto	W 101–83	Paul George (21)	Paul George (11)	Paul George (6)	Bankers Life Fieldhouse; 18,165	3–3
7	May 1	@ Toronto	L 84–89	Paul George (26)	Paul George (12)	Monta Ellis (7)	Air Canada Centre; 19,800	3–4

2016 playoff schedule

== Player statistics ==
=== Regular season ===
Player	POS	GP	GS	MP	REB	AST	STL	BLK	PTS	MPG	RPG	APG	SPG	BPG	PPG
Paul George	SF	81	81	2,819	563	329	152	29	1,874	34.8	7.0	4.1	1.9	.4	23.1
Monta Ellis	SG	81	81	2,734	271	383	150	37	1,121	33.8	3.3	4.7	1.9	.5	13.8
Lavoy Allen	PF	79	28	1,599	424	76	26	42	428	20.2	5.4	1.0	.3	.5	5.4
George Hill	PG	74	73	2,524	298	259	83	17	894	34.1	4.0	3.5	1.1	.2	12.1
Jordan Hill	C	73	11	1,513	451	87	36	37	645	20.7	6.2	1.2	.5	.5	8.8
Ian Mahinmi	C	71	71	1,816	507	104	65	75	660	25.6	7.1	1.5	.9	1.1	9.3
C. J. Miles	SF	64	24	1,464	175	63	53	29	753	22.9	2.7	1.0	.8	.5	11.8
Myles Turner	C	60	30	1,367	332	41	25	86	619	22.8	5.5	.7	.4	1.4	10.3
Solomon Hill	SF	59	3	866	166	57	37	11	246	14.7	2.8	1.0	.6	.2	4.2
Rodney Stuckey	PG	58	1	1,275	156	142	43	8	517	22.0	2.7	2.4	.7	.1	8.9
Chase Budinger^{†}	SF	49	2	729	121	49	29	9	216	14.9	2.5	1.0	.6	.2	4.4
Glenn Robinson III	SF	45	4	508	68	26	17	9	171	11.3	1.5	.6	.4	.2	3.8
Joe Young	PG	41	0	384	50	65	15	0	154	9.4	1.2	1.6	.4	.0	3.8
Ty Lawson^{†}	PG	13	1	235	31	57	10	1	64	18.1	2.4	4.4	.8	.1	4.9
Shayne Whittington	PF	7	0	41	12	3	1	1	11	5.9	1.7	.4	.1	.1	1.6
Rakeem Christmas	PF	1	0	6	1	0	0	0	4	6.0	1.0	.0	.0	.0	4.0

- ^{†} Denotes player spent time with another team in the season. Stats reflect time with the Pacers only.

=== Playoffs ===
Player	POS	GP	GS	MP	REB	AST	STL	BLK	PTS	MPG	RPG	APG	SPG	BPG	PPG
Paul George	SF	7	7	275	53	30	14	5	191	39.3	7.6	4.3	2.0	.7	27.3
George Hill	PG	7	7	235	19	15	6	1	95	33.6	2.7	2.1	.9	.1	13.6
Monta Ellis	SG	7	7	225	27	30	15	0	81	32.1	3.9	4.3	2.1	.0	11.6
Ian Mahinmi	C	7	7	172	36	8	5	6	57	24.6	5.1	1.1	.7	.9	8.1
Myles Turner	C	7	4	197	45	3	2	23	72	28.1	6.4	.4	.3	3.3	10.3
Solomon Hill	SF	7	0	198	28	8	2	0	54	28.3	4.0	1.1	.3	.0	7.7
Rodney Stuckey	PG	7	0	125	15	14	4	1	44	17.9	2.1	2.0	.6	.1	6.3
C. J. Miles	SF	7	0	92	24	4	1	1	24	13.1	3.4	.6	.1	.1	3.4
Ty Lawson	PG	7	0	74	7	10	3	0	16	10.6	1.0	1.4	.4	.0	2.3
Lavoy Allen	PF	6	3	51	14	2	1	1	6	8.5	2.3	.3	.2	.2	1.0
Jordan Hill	C	5	0	15	6	2	0	0	0	3.0	1.2	.4	.0	.0	.0
Joe Young	PG	4	0	10	1	1	0	0	9	2.5	.3	.3	.0	.0	2.3
Glenn Robinson III	SF	4	0	10	0	0	0	1	7	2.5	.0	.0	.0	.3	1.8

== Transactions ==
=== Trades ===
July 9, 2015	To Indiana Pacers 2019 LAL second-round pick (Eric Paschall)	To Los Angeles Lakers Roy Hibbert
July 12, 2015	To Indiana Pacers Chase Budinger	To Minnesota Timberwolves Damjan Rudež
July 23, 2015	To Indiana Pacers Rakeem Christmas	To Cleveland Cavaliers 2019 LAL second-round pick (Eric Paschall)

=== Re-signed ===
Player	Signed	Former Team
Rodney Stuckey	Signed 3-year contract worth $21 million	Indiana Pacers
Shayne Whittington	Signed 2-year contract worth $1.8 million	Indiana Pacers

==== Additions ====
Player	Signed	Former Team
Monta Ellis	Signed 4-year contract worth $44 million	Dallas Mavericks
Jordan Hill	Signed 1-year contract worth $4 million	Los Angeles Lakers
Glenn Robinson III	Signed 3-year contract worth $3.2 million	Philadelphia 76ers
Ty Lawson		Houston Rockets

==== Subtractions ====
Player	Reason Left	New Team
David West	Signed 2-year contract worth $3 million	San Antonio Spurs
Luis Scola	Signed 1-year contract worth $2.9 million	Toronto Raptors
C.J. Watson	Signed 3-year contract worth $15 million	Orlando Magic
Chris Copeland	Signed 1-year contract worth $1.1 million	Milwaukee Bucks
