= 2015–16 Atlanta Hawks season =

NBA professional basketball team season

- Head coach: Mike Budenholzer
- Owners: Tony Ressler
- Arena: Philips Arena

Results
- Record: 48–34 (.585)
- Place: Division: 2nd (Southeast); Conference: 4th (Eastern)
- Playoff finish: Conference Semifinals (lost to Cavaliers 0–4)
- Stats at Basketball Reference

Local media
- Television: Fox Sports South
- Radio: 92.9 FM "The Game"

The 2015–16 Atlanta Hawks season was the 67th season of the franchise in the National Basketball Association (NBA) and the 48th in Atlanta.

In the off-season, the Hawks introduced a new logo and uniforms for the season.

In the regular season, the Hawks came 12 games short of tying their franchise-best 60–22 record from their previous season. They defeated the Boston Celtics in the opening round, but were swept in four games by the LeBron James-led and eventual NBA champion Cleveland Cavaliers in the Semifinals, who had also swept them in last season's Eastern Conference finals as well as the 2009 Eastern Conference Semi-finals.

Also, this season was the end of the Al Horford era in Atlanta, as he joined the Celtics during the following season.

== Key dates ==
- June 25: The 2015 NBA draft took place at Barclays Center in Brooklyn, New York.
- July 1: 2015 NBA free agency begins.
- November 24: The Atlanta Hawks would retire Dikembe Mutombo's number 55.

== Draft picks ==
Round	Pick	Player	Position	Nationality	School/Club team
1	15	Kelly Oubre Jr.	SF	United States	Kansas
2	50	Marcus Eriksson	SG	Sweden	Barcelona
2	59	Dimitrios Agravanis	PF	Greece	Olympiacos

== Roster ==
2015–16 Atlanta Hawks roster
Players

Pos.	No.	Player	Height	Weight	DOB	From
G	24	Kent Bazemore	6 ft 5 in (1.96 m)	201 lb (91 kg)	1989–07–01	Old Dominion
G	10	Tim Hardaway Jr.	6 ft 6 in (1.98 m)	205 lb (93 kg)	1992–03–16	Michigan
G	12	Kirk Hinrich	6 ft 4 in (1.93 m)	190 lb (86 kg)	1981–01–02	Kansas
F/C	15	Al Horford	6 ft 10 in (2.08 m)	250 lb (113 kg)	1986–06–03	Florida
F	43	Kris Humphries	6 ft 9 in (2.06 m)	235 lb (107 kg)	1985–02–06	Minnesota
G/F	26	Kyle Korver	6 ft 7 in (2.01 m)	212 lb (96 kg)	1981–03–17	Creighton
F	4	Paul Millsap	6 ft 8 in (2.03 m)	246 lb (112 kg)	1985–02–10	Louisiana Tech
F/C	31	Mike Muscala	6 ft 11 in (2.11 m)	240 lb (109 kg)	1991–07–01	Bucknell
G/F	13	Lamar Patterson	6 ft 5 in (1.96 m)	225 lb (102 kg)	1991–08–12	Pittsburgh
G	17	Dennis Schröder	6 ft 0 in (1.83 m)	172 lb (78 kg)	1993–09–15	Germany
F	32	Mike Scott	6 ft 8 in (2.03 m)	237 lb (108 kg)	1988–07–16	Virginia
G/F	25	Thabo Sefolosha	6 ft 7 in (2.01 m)	220 lb (100 kg)	1984–05–02	Switzerland
C	11	Tiago Splitter	6 ft 11 in (2.11 m)	245 lb (111 kg)	1985–01–01	Brazil
C	22	Walter Tavares	7 ft 3 in (2.21 m)	260 lb (118 kg)	1992–03–22	Cape Verde
G	0	Jeff Teague	6 ft 2 in (1.88 m)	186 lb (84 kg)	1988–06–10	Wake Forest

Coaches
Head coach
- Mike Budenholzer
Assistant(s)
- Kenny Atkinson
- Darvin Ham
- Taylor Jenkins
- Charles Lee
- Neven Spahija
- Ben Sullivan
- Pete Radulovic (player development)

Legend
- (DP) Unsigned draft pick
- (FA) Free agent
- (S) Suspended
- (DL) On assignment to D-League affiliate
- Injured

Roster
Updated: 2016–04–21

== Game log ==
=== Pre-season ===
2015 pre-season game log
Total: 4–3 (home: 1–2; road: 3–1)
Pre-season: 4–3 (home: 1–2; road: 3–1)

Game	Date	Team	Score	High points	High rebounds	High assists	Location Attendance	Record
1	October 7	@ Cleveland	98–96	Jeff Teague (17)	Al Horford (8)	Shelvin Mack (5)	Cintas Center; 10,250	1–0
2	October 9	@ New Orleans	103–93	Dennis Schröder (11)	Paul Millsap (8)	Patterson, Teague (3)	Veterans Memorial Arena; 7,628	2–0
3	October 14	San Antonio	100–86	Jeff Teague (19)	Paul Millsap (9)	Horford, Schröder (4)	Philips Arena; 11,801	3–0
4	October 16	@ Dallas	91–84	Al Horford (16)	Mike Scott (6)	Mack, Schröder (4)	American Airlines Center; 19,315	4–0
5	October 18	Miami	92–101	Mike Scott (19)	Mike Scott (8)	Lamar Patterson (4)	Philips Arena; 13,038	4–1
6	October 21	Memphis	81–82	Kent Bazemore (18)	Al Horford (14)	Jeff Teague (9)	Philips Arena; 11,273	4–2
7	October 23	@ Detroit	87–115	Mike Scott (20)	Walter Tavares (12)	Lamar Patterson (6)	The Palace of Auburn Hills; 12,804	4–3

2015–16 season schedule

== Standing ==
Southeast Division	W	L	PCT	GB	Home	Road	Div	GP
y – Miami Heat	48	34	.585	–	28‍–‍13	20‍–‍21	10–6	82
x – Atlanta Hawks	48	34	.585	–	27‍–‍14	21‍–‍20	8–8	82
x – Charlotte Hornets	48	34	.585	–	30‍–‍11	18‍–‍23	8–8	82
e – Washington Wizards	41	41	.500	7.0	22‍–‍19	19‍–‍22	10–6	82
e – Orlando Magic	35	47	.427	13.0	23‍–‍18	12‍–‍29	4–12	82

Eastern Conference
#	Team	W	L	PCT	GB	GP
1	c – Cleveland Cavaliers *	57	25	.695	–	82
2	y – Toronto Raptors *	56	26	.683	1.0	82
3	y – Miami Heat *	48	34	.585	9.0	82
4	x – Atlanta Hawks	48	34	.585	9.0	82
5	x – Boston Celtics	48	34	.585	9.0	82
6	x – Charlotte Hornets	48	34	.585	9.0	82
7	x – Indiana Pacers	45	37	.549	12.0	82
8	x – Detroit Pistons	44	38	.537	13.0	82
9	e – Chicago Bulls	42	40	.512	15.0	82
10	e – Washington Wizards	41	41	.500	16.0	82
11	e – Orlando Magic	35	47	.427	22.0	82
12	e – Milwaukee Bucks	33	49	.402	24.0	82
13	e – New York Knicks	32	50	.390	25.0	82
14	e – Brooklyn Nets	21	61	.256	36.0	82
15	e – Philadelphia 76ers	10	72	.122	47.0	82

== Regular season game log ==
2015–16 game log
Total: 48–34 (home: 27–14; road: 21–20)
October: 2–1 (home: 1–1; road: 1–0)

Game	Date	Team	Score	High points	High rebounds	High assists	Location Attendance	Record
1	October 27	Detroit	L 94–106	Dennis Schröder (20)	Paul Millsap (8)	Horford, Schröder, Teague (4)	Philips Arena; 19,187	0–1
2	October 29	@ New York	W 112–101	Jeff Teague (23)	Paul Millsap (11)	Jeff Teague (8)	Madison Square Garden; 19,812	1–1
3	October 30	Charlotte	W 97–94	Kent Bazemore (19)	Paul Millsap (10)	Millsap & Teague (4)	Philips Arena; 17,024	2–1

November : 10–7 (home: 6–2; road: 4–5)

Game	Date	Team	Score	High points	High rebounds	High assists	Location Attendance	Record,
4	November 1	@ Charlotte	W 94–92	Kent Bazemore (20)	Al Horford (12)	Paul Millsap (6)	Time Warner Cable Arena; 18,691	3–1
5	November 3	@ Miami	W 98–92	Jeff Teague (29)	Al Horford (13)	Jeff Teague (9)	American Airlines Arena; 19,600	4–1
6	November 4	Brooklyn	W 101–87	Al Horford (21)	Paul Millsap (9)	Jeff Teague (6)	Philips Arena; 14,044	5–1
7	November 6	@ New Orleans	W 121–115	Korver, Millsap (22)	Paul Millsap (12)	Jeff Teague (7)	Smoothie King Center; 16,983	6–1
8	November 7	Washington	W 114–99	Kent Bazemore (25)	Al Horford (9)	Jeff Teague (8)	Philips Arena; 18,047	7–1
9	November 9	Minnesota	L 107–117	Jeff Teague (24)	Bazemore, Horford (6)	Jeff Teague (9)	Philips Arena; 12,016	7–2
10	November 11	New Orleans	W 106–98	Al Horford (26)	Paul Millsap (16)	Jeff Teague (10)	Philips Arena; 15,597	8–2
11	November 13	@ Boston	L 93–106	Paul Millsap (14)	Paul Millsap (8)	Al Horford (8)	TD Garden; 17,138	8–3
12	November 15	Utah	L 96–97	Paul Millsap (28)	Millsap, Schröder, Sefolosha (6)	Dennis Schröder (9)	Philips Arena; 14,436	8–4
13	November 17	@ Brooklyn	L 88–90	Al Horford (18)	Thabo Sefolosha (7)	Dennis Schröder (10)	Barclays Center; 12,241	8–5
14	November 18	Sacramento	W 103–97	Paul Millsap (23)	Paul Millsap (16)	Dennis Schröder (6)	Philips Arena; 13,008	9–5
15	November 21	@ Cleveland	L 97–109	Korver, Millsap (14)	Paul Millsap (11)	Paul Millsap (5)	Quicken Loans Arena; 20,562	9–6
16	November 24	Boston	W 121–97	Paul Millsap (25)	Paul Millsap (9)	Jeff Teague (9)	Philips Arena; 18,968	10–6
17	November 25	@ Minnesota	L 95–99	Millsap, Teague (22)	Al Horford (12)	Jeff Teague (5)	Target Center; 14,289	10–7
18	November 27	@ Memphis	W 116–101	Paul Millsap (23)	Paul Millsap (14)	Jeff Teague (7)	FedExForum; 17,684	11–7
19	November 28	@ San Antonio	L 88–108	Mike Scott (12)	Paul Millsap (8)	Dennis Schröder (6)	AT&T Center; 18,418	11–8
20	November 30	Oklahoma City	W 106–100	Paul Millsap (26)	Al Horford (13)	Thabo Sefolosha (6)	Philips Arena; 17,768	12–8

December : 9–5 (home: 5–3; road: 4–2)

Game	Date	Team	Score	High points	High rebounds	High assists	Location Attendance	Record
21	December 2	Toronto	L 86–96	Paul Millsap (14)	Horford, Millsap (9)	Jeff Teague (10)	Philips Arena; 12,559	12–9
22	December 4	L. A. Lakers	W 100–87	Al Horford (16)	Al Horford (9)	Horford, Teague (5)	Philips Arena; 19,051	13–9
23	December 9	@ Dallas	W 98–95	Paul Millsap (20)	Paul Millsap (11)	Jeff Teague (6)	American Airlines Center; 19,936	14–9
24	December 10	@ Oklahoma City	L 94–107	Kent Bazemore (22)	Paul Millsap (8)	Korver, Millsap, Teague (4)	Chesapeake Energy Arena; 18,203	14–10
25	December 12	San Antonio	L 78–103	Paul Millsap (22)	Al Horford (7)	Dennis Schröder (7)	Philips Arena; 17,752	14–11
26	December 14	Miami	L 88–100	Kent Bazemore (28)	Paul Millsap (9)	Dennis Schröder (7)	Philips Arena; 15,039	14–12
27	December 16	Philadelphia	W 127–106	Paul Millsap (28)	Kent Bazemore (7)	Korver, Schröder (7)	Philips Arena; 14,827	15–12
28	December 18	@ Boston	W 109–101	Dennis Schröder (22)	Al Horford (10)	Jeff Teague (6)	TD Garden; 18,624	16–12
29	December 20	@ Orlando	W 103–100	Kyle Korver (19)	Paul Millsap (13)	Horford, Teague (6)	Amway Center; 16,982	17–12
30	December 21	Portland	W 106–97	Dennis Schröder (18)	Kent Bazemore (7)	Jeff Teague (8)	Philips Arena; 18,373	18–12
31	December 23	Detroit	W 107–100	Jeff Teague (23)	Bazemore, Teague (6)	Jeff Teague (9)	Philips Arena; 17,575	19–12
32	December 26	New York	W 117–98	Paul Millsap (22)	Paul Millsap (7)	Horford, Millsap (7)	Philips Arena; 19,015	20–12
33	December 28	@ Indiana	L 87–93	Paul Millsap (24)	Al Horford (10)	Kent Bazemore (6)	Bankers Life Fieldhouse; 18,165	20–13
34	December 29	@ Houston	W 121–115	Al Horford (30)	Al Horford (14)	Jeff Teague (8)	Toyota Center; 18,211	21–13

January : 6–9 (home: 3–2; road: 3–7)

Game	Date	Team	Score	High points	High rebounds	High assists	Location Attendance	Record
35	January 3	@ New York	L 97–111	Paul Millsap (19)	Paul Millsap (9)	Paul Millsap (6)	Madison Square Garden; 19,812	21–14
36	January 5	New York	L 101–107	Paul Millsap (19)	Al Horford (8)	Horford, Schröder (8)	Philips Arena; 15,082	21–15
37	January 7	@ Philadelphia	W 126–98	Kent Bazemore (22)	Al Horford (9)	Dennis Schröder (6)	Wells Fargo Center; 12,611	22–15
38	January 9	Chicago	W 120–107	Al Horford (33)	Al Horford (10)	Dennis Schroder (8)	Philips Arena; 19,010	23–15
39	January 13	@ Charlotte	L 84–107	Al Horford (20)	Millsap, Muscala, Schröder (10)	Dennis Schroder (6)	Time Warner Cable Arena; 15,334	23–16
40	January 15	@ Milwaukee	L 101–108 (OT)	Paul Millsap (23)	Paul Millsap (10)	Jeff Teague (10)	BMO Harris Bradley Center; 15,144	23–17
41	January 16	Brooklyn	W 114–86	Paul Millsap (21)	Millsap, Schröder (6)	Dennis Schroder (10)	Philips Arena; 17,052	24–17
42	January 18	Orlando	W 98–81	Al Horford (15)	Paul Millsap (12)	Dennis Schröder (8)	Philips Arena; 17,460	25–17
43	January 20	@ Portland	W 104–98	Bazemore, Millsap (23)	Paul Millsap (9)	Jeff Teague (6)	Moda Center; 18,783	26–17
44	January 21	@ Sacramento	L 88–91	Paul Millsap (14)	Paul Millsap (14)	Schröder, Teague (4)	Sleep Train Arena; 17,019	26–18
45	January 23	@ Phoenix	L 95–98	Kent Bazemore (21)	Al Horford (16)	Horford, Schröder (5)	Talking Stick Resort Arena; 17,034	26–19
46	January 25	@ Denver	W 119–105	Paul Millsap (22)	Paul Millsap (9)	Jeff Teague (10)	Pepsi Center; 10,280	27–19
47	January 27	L. A. Clippers	L 83–85	Jeff Teague (16)	Paul Millsap (12)	Al Horford (6)	Philips Arena; 17,664	27–20
48	January 28	@ Indiana	L 92–111	Jeff Teague (20)	Kent Bazemore (9)	Jeff Teague (5)	Bankers Life Fieldhouse; 15,196	27–21
49	January 31	@ Miami	L 87–105	Horford, Millsap (17)	Kent Bazemore (10)	Jeff Teague (6)	American Airlines Arena; 19,937	27–22

February : 6–5 (home: 4–4; road: 2–1)

Game	Date	Team	Score	High points	High rebounds	High assists	Location Attendance	Record
50	February 1	Dallas	W 112–97	Jeff Teague (32)	Paul Millsap (12)	Jeff Teague (8)	Philips Arena; 15,455	28–22
51	February 3	@ Philadelphia	W 124–86	Hardaway Jr., Scott (13)	Scott (9)	Hardaway Jr., Horford (4)	Wells Fargo Center; 10,429	29–22
52	February 5	Indiana	W 102–96	Paul Millsap (24)	Al Horford (7)	Kent Bazemore (8)	Philips Arena; 17,225	30–22
53	February 7	@ Orlando	L 94–96	Jeff Teague (24)	Paul Millsap (9)	Al Horford (6)	Amway Center; 16,021	30–23
54	February 8	Orlando	L 110–117 (OT)	Al Horford (27)	Bazemore, Millsap (13)	Millsap, Schröder (6)	Philips Arena; 13,057	30–24
55	February 10	@ Chicago	W 113–90	Dennis Schröder (18)	Bazemore, Hardaway Jr., Muscala (6)	Jeff Teague (8)	United Center; 21,709	31–24
All-Star Break
56	February 19	Miami	L 111–115	Jeff Teague (23)	Paul Millsap (13)	Jeff Teague (7)	Philips Arena; 19,043	31–25
57	February 20	Milwaukee	L 109–117 (2OT)	Paul Millsap (27)	Paul Millsap (11)	Dennis Schröder (10)	Philips Arena; 18,653	31–26
58	February 22	Golden State	L 92–102	Al Horford (23)	Al Horford (16)	Horford, Teague (6)	Philips Arena; 18,717	31–27
59	February 26	Chicago	W 103–88	Jeff Teague (19)	Paul Millsap (13)	Jeff Teague (9)	Philips Arena; 18,123	32–27
60	February 28	Charlotte	W 87–76	Kent Bazemore (14)	Al Horford (16)	Al Horford (6)	Philips Arena; 17,156	33–27

March : 12–4 (home: 5–1; road: 7–3)

Game	Date	Team	Score	High points	High rebounds	High assists	Location Attendance	Record
61	March 1	@ Golden State	L 105–109 (OT)	Paul Millsap (19)	Bazemore, Horford (9)	Dennis Schröder (9)	Oracle Arena; 19,596	33–28
62	March 4	@ L.A. Lakers	W 106–77	Dennis Schröder (16)	Kris Humphries (8)	Jeff Teague (8)	Staples Center; 18,997	34–28
63	March 5	@ L.A. Clippers	W 107–97	Jeff Teague (22)	Paul Millsap (18)	Jeff Teague (7)	Staples Center; 19,236	35–28
64	March 8	@ Utah	W 91–84	Jeff Teague (24)	Paul Millsap (9)	Jeff Teague (6)	Vivint Smart Home Arena; 19,282	36–28
65	March 10	@ Toronto	L 96–104	Al Horford (20)	Kent Bazemore (8)	Jeff Teague (7)	Air Canada Centre; 19,800	36–29
66	March 12	Memphis	W 95–83	Al Horford (19)	Thabo Sefolosha (11)	Jeff Teague (7)	Philips Arena; 17,515	37–29
67	March 13	Indiana	W 104–75	Horford, Millsap (19)	Paul Millsap (9)	Jeff Teague (9)	Philips Arena; 17,066	38–29
68	March 16	@ Detroit	W 118–114	Jeff Teague (22)	Al Horford (11)	Jeff Teague (9)	Palace of Auburn Hills; 14,121	39–29
69	March 17	Denver	W 116–98	Tim Hardaway Jr. (21)	Paul Millsap (11)	Jeff Teague (8)	Philips Arena; 14,383	40–29
70	March 19	Houston	W 109–97	Al Horford (22)	Paul Millsap (10)	Jeff Teague (7)	Philips Arena; 18,067	41–29
71	March 21	Washington	L 102–117	Jeff Teague (23)	Al Horford (9)	Al Horford (9)	Philips Arena; 15,729	41–30
72	March 23	@ Washington	W 122–101	Dennis Schröder (23)	Paul Millsap (9)	Dennis Schröder (8)	Verizon Center; 18,807	42–30
73	March 25	Milwaukee	W 101–90	Jeff Teague (18)	Paul Millsap (13)	Jeff Teague (6)	Philips Arena; 17,070	43–30
74	March 26	@ Detroit	W 112–95	Paul Millsap (23)	Paul Millsap (9)	Jeff Teague (12)	The Palace of Auburn Hills; 17,857	44–30
75	March 28	@ Chicago	W 102–100	Jeff Teague (26)	Paul Millsap (11)	Jeff Teague (7)	United Center; 21,761	45–30
76	March 30	@ Toronto	L 97–105	Jeff Teague (18)	Paul Millsap (9)	Al Horford (3)	Air Canada Centre; 19,800	45–31

April : 3–3 (home: 3–1; road: 0–2)

Game	Date	Team	Score	High points	High rebounds	High assists	Location Attendance	Record
77	April 1	Cleveland	L 108–110 (OT)	Paul Millsap (29)	Paul Millsap (12)	Jeff Teague (9)	Philips Arena; 19,427	45–32
78	April 5	Phoenix	W 103–90	Jeff Teague (20)	Paul Millsap (17)	Paul Millsap (8)	Philips Arena; 15,176	46–32
79	April 7	Toronto	W 95–87	Jeff Teague (23)	Paul Millsap (14)	Al Horford (6)	Philips Arena; 17,864	47–32
80	April 9	Boston	W 118–107	Paul Millsap (31)	Paul Millsap (16)	Jeff Teague (7)	Philips Arena; 19,257	48–32
81	April 11	@ Cleveland	L 94–109	Kent Bazemore (23)	Al Horford (11)	Jeff Teague (9)	Quicken Loans Arena; 20,562	48–33
82	April 13	@ Washington	L 98–109	Al Horford (19)	Paul Millsap (16)	Jeff Teague (5)	Verizon Center; 17,399	48–34

2015–16 season schedule

== Playoffs ==
=== Game log ===
2016 playoff game log
Total: 4–6 (home: 3–2; road: 1–4)
First Round: 4–2 (home: 3–0; road: 1–2)

Game	Date	Team	Score	High points	High rebounds	High assists	Location Attendance	Series
1	April 16	Boston	W 102–101	Al Horford (24)	Al Horford (12)	Jeff Teague (12)	Philips Arena; 18,980	1–0
2	April 19	Boston	W 89–72	Horford, Korver (17)	Kent Bazemore (9)	Jeff Teague (6)	Philips Arena; 18,972	2–0
3	April 22	@ Boston	L 103–111	Jeff Teague (23)	Al Horford (13)	Al Horford (6)	TD Garden; 18,624	2–1
4	April 24	@ Boston	L 95–104 (OT)	Paul Millsap (45)	Paul Millsap (13)	Horford, Teague (5)	TD Garden; 18,624	2–2
5	April 26	Boston	W 110–83	Mike Scott (17)	Horford, Millsap (8)	Millsap, Sefolosha (6)	Philips Arena; 18,987	3–2
6	April 28	@ Boston	W 104–92	Paul Millsap (17)	Kyle Korver (9)	Dennis Schröder (8)	TD Garden; 18,624	4–2

Conference Semifinals: 0–4 (home: 0–2; road: 0–2)

Game	Date	Team	Score	High points	High rebounds	High assists	Location Attendance	Series
1	May 2	@ Cleveland	L 93–104	Dennis Schröder (27)	Paul Millsap (13)	Dennis Schröder (6)	Quicken Loans Arena; 20,562	0–1
2	May 4	@ Cleveland	L 98–123	Paul Millsap (16)	Paul Millsap (11)	Jeff Teague (6)	Quicken Loans Arena; 20,562	0–2
3	May 6	Cleveland	L 108–121	Al Horford (24)	Paul Millsap (8)	Jeff Teague (14)	Philips Arena; 19,089	0–3
4	May 8	Cleveland	L 99–100	Dennis Schröder (21)	Paul Millsap (9)	Dennis Schröder (6)	Philips Arena; 19,031	0–4

2016 playoff schedule

== Player statistics ==
Legend
GP	Games played	GS	Games started	MPG	Minutes per game
FG%	Field-goal percentage	3P%	3-point field-goal percentage	FT%	Free-throw percentage
RPG	Rebounds per game	APG	Assists per game	SPG	Steals per game
BPG	Blocks per game	PPG	Points per game

=== Regular season ===
Player	GP	GS	MPG	FG%	3P%	FT%	RPG	APG	SPG	BPG	PPG
Kent Bazemore	75	68	27.8	.441	.357	.810	5.1	2.3	1.3	.5	11.6
Tim Hardaway Jr.	51	1	16.9	.430	.338	.890	1.7	1.0	.4	.1	6.4
Kirk Hinrich*	11	0	6.9	.182	.167	.000	1.1	1.3	.2	.1	.5
Justin Holiday*	26	1	10.1	.329	.222	.504	1.0	.4	.5	.2	2.4
Al Horford	82	82	32.1	.505	.344	.802	7.3	3.2	.8	1.5	15.2
Kris Humphries*	21	0	14.0	.465	.258	.710	3.4	.6	.5	.3	6.4
Kyle Korver	80	80	30.0	.435	.399	.830	3.3	2.1	.8	.4	9.2
Shelvin Mack*	24	0	7.5	.421	.148	.750	.9	1.6	.3	.0	3.9
Paul Millsap	81	81	32.7	.470	.319	.760	9.0	3.3	1.8	1.7	17.1
Mike Muscala	60	0	9.4	.500	.308	.790	2.0	.6	.2	.5	3.3
Lamar Patterson	35	0	11.3	.350	.245	.730	1.4	1.1	.3	.1	2.4
Dennis Schröder	80	6	20.3	.421	.322	.790	2.6	4.4	.9	.1	11.0
Mike Scott	75	0	15.3	.468	.392	.790	2.7	1.0	.3	.2	6.2
Thabo Sefolosha	75	11	23.4	.505	.339	.630	4.5	1.4	1.1	.5	6.4
Tiago Splitter	36	2	16.1	.523	.000	.810	3.3	.8	.6	.3	5.6
Walter Tavares	11	0	6.6	.579	.000	.380	1.9	.3	.1	.6	2.3
Jeff Teague	79	78	28.5	.439	.400	.840	2.7	5.9	1.2	.3	15.7

=== Playoffs ===
Player	GP	GS	MPG	FG%	3P%	FT%	RPG	APG	SPG	BPG	PPG
Paul Millsap	10	10	36.5	.431	.242	.745	9.4	2.7	1.3	2.3	16.7
Al Horford	10	10	32.7	.466	.393	.938	6.5	3.0	1.2	2.4	13.4
Kent Bazemore	10	10	32.5	.364	.262	.682	6.6	1.9	1.4	.6	11.9
Jeff Teague	10	10	27.9	.380	.250	.846	1.9	6.2	.6	.2	14.5
Kyle Korver	10	8	31.6	.467	.444	1.000	4.8	1.0	1.0	.4	10.3
Thabo Sefolosha	10	2	20.3	.478	.368	.533	4.1	1.7	1.0	.6	5.9
Dennis Schröder	10	0	19.1	.452	.343	.846	1.9	3.6	.4	.1	11.7
Mike Scott	10	0	16.1	.625	.500	.875	3.2	.5	.3	.3	6.5
Tim Hardaway Jr.	9	0	9.7	.269	.143	.667	1.0	.8	.0	.1	2.2
Mike Muscala	9	0	7.4	.500	.333	1.000	1.9	.3	.0	.1	2.7
Kirk Hinrich	6	0	4.5	.286	.333		.7	.5	.0	.0	.8
Kris Humphries	4	0	14.0	.464	.500	1.000	6.0	1.0	.5	1.3	9.3
Lamar Patterson	4	0	5.0	.286	.333	1.000	1.3	.8	.3	.0	1.5

== Transactions ==
=== Overview ===
Players Added

Via draft

- Walter Tavares
- Lamar Patterson

Via free agency

- Justin Holiday

Via trade

- Tim Hardaway Jr.
- Tiago Splitter
Players Lost

Via free agency

- Pero Antić
- DeMarre Carroll
- John Jenkins
- Elton Brand

Waived

- Austin Daye

=== Trades ===
June 25, 2015	To Atlanta Hawks Tim Hardaway Jr. (from New York); Two future second-round picks (from Washington)	To New York Knicks Draft rights to Jerian Grant (from Washington)
June 25, 2015	To Washington Wizards Draft rights to Kelly Oubre, Jr. (from Atlanta)
July 9, 2015	To Atlanta Hawks Tiago Splitter	To San Antonio Spurs Rights to Georgios Printezis; Future second-round pick
February 18, 2015	To Atlanta Hawks Kirk Hinrich (from Chicago)	To Chicago Bulls Justin Holiday (from Atlanta); 2018 second-round pick (from Utah)
February 18, 2015	To Utah Jazz Shelvin Mack (from Atlanta)

=== Free agents ===
==== Re-signed ====
Player	Signed	Former Team
Paul Millsap	Signed 3-year contract worth $59 Million	Atlanta Hawks

==== Additions ====
Player	Signed	Former team
Walter Tavares	Signed 3-year contract worth $3 Million	(Spain) Gran Canaria (DP)
Justin Holiday	Signed 2-year worth $2 Million	Golden State Warriors
Lamar Patterson	Signed 1-year contract worth $1.5 million	(Turkey) Tofaş (DP)
Terran Petteway*	Signed 2-year contract worth $1.4 million	Nebraska
Jason Richardson*	Signed 1-year contract worth $1.5 million	Philadelphia 76ers
DeQuan Jones*	Training Camp	(Italy) Pallacanestro Cantù
Édgar Sosa*	Training Camp	(Italy) Dinamo Sassari
Earl Barron*	Training Camp	Phoenix Suns
Arsalan Kazemi*	Training Camp	(China) Chongqing Soaring Dragons
Kris Humphries	Signed 1-year contract worth $388 thousand	Phoenix Suns

* = Did not make 15-man roster

==== Subtractions ====
Player	Reason left	New team
Pero Antić	Signed a 2-year contract	(Turkey) Fenerbahçe
DeMarre Carroll	Signed 4-year contract worth $58 million	Toronto Raptors
Austin Daye	Waived	Cleveland Cavaliers
John Jenkins	Signed 3-year contract worth $3.2 million	Dallas Mavericks
Elton Brand	Retired / Unretired	Philadelphia 76ers
Jason Richardson	Retired due to injuries	—N/a
