= 2015–16 Washington Wizards season =

Season of National Basketball Association team the Washington Wizards

- Head coach: Randy Wittman
- General manager: Ernie Grunfeld
- Owners: Ted Leonsis
- Arena: Verizon Center

Results
- Record: 41–41 (.500)
- Place: Division: 4th (Southeast); Conference: 10th (Eastern)
- Playoff finish: Did not qualify
- Stats at Basketball Reference

The 2015–16 Washington Wizards season was the 55th season of the franchise in the National Basketball Association (NBA) and 43rd in the Washington, D.C. area. Coach Randy Wittman was fired and relieved of his duties after missing the playoffs and replaced by former Oklahoma City Thunder head coach Scott Brooks the following season.

== Draft picks ==
Round	Pick	Player	Position	Nationality	College
1	19	Jerian Grant	PG / SG	United States	Notre Dame
2	49	Aaron White	PF	United States	Iowa

== Roster ==
2015–16 Washington Wizards roster
Players

Pos.	No.	Player	Height	Weight	DOB	From
SG	6	Alan Anderson	6 ft 6 in (1.98 m)	220 lb (100 kg)	1982-10-16	Michigan State
SG	3	Bradley Beal	6 ft 5 in (1.96 m)	207 lb (94 kg)	1993-06-28	Florida
PF	1	Jared Dudley	6 ft 7 in (2.01 m)	225 lb (102 kg)	1985-07-10	Boston College
SF	8	Jarell Eddie	6 ft 7 in (2.01 m)	218 lb (99 kg)	1991-10-30	Virginia Tech
PF	90	Drew Gooden	6 ft 10 in (2.08 m)	250 lb (113 kg)	1981-09-24	Kansas
C	13	Marcin Gortat	6 ft 11 in (2.11 m)	240 lb (109 kg)	1984-02-17	Poland
C	21	JJ Hickson	6 ft 9 in (2.06 m)	242 lb (110 kg)	1988-09-04	NC State
PF	5	Markieff Morris	6 ft 10 in (2.08 m)	245 lb (111 kg)	1989-09-02	Kansas
PF	42	Nenê	6 ft 11 in (2.11 m)	250 lb (113 kg)	1982-09-13	Brazil
SF	12	Kelly Oubre Jr.	6 ft 7 in (2.01 m)	205 lb (93 kg)	1995-12-09	Kansas
SF	22	Otto Porter	6 ft 8 in (2.03 m)	198 lb (90 kg)	1993-06-03	Georgetown
PG	7	Ramon Sessions	6 ft 3 in (1.91 m)	190 lb (86 kg)	1986-04-11	Nevada
SF	17	Garrett Temple	6 ft 6 in (1.98 m)	195 lb (88 kg)	1986-05-08	LSU
SG	15	Marcus Thornton	6 ft 4 in (1.93 m)	205 lb (93 kg)	1987-06-05	LSU
PG	2	John Wall	6 ft 4 in (1.93 m)	195 lb (88 kg)	1990-09-06	Kentucky

Coaches
Head coach
- Randy Wittman
Assistant(s)
- Howard Eisley
- Don Newman
- Roy Rogers
- Pat Sullivan
- Don Zierden
- David Adkins (player development)
- Eric Waters (trainer)

Legend
- (DP) Unsigned draft pick
- (FA) Free agent
- (S) Suspended
- (DL) On assignment to D-League affiliate
- Injured

Roster
Updated: March 9, 2016

== Pre-season ==
2015 pre-season game log
Total: 4–3 (Home: 2–1; Road: 2–2)
Pre-season: 4–3 (home: 2–1; road: 2–2)

Game	Date	Team	Score	High points	High rebounds	High assists	Location Attendance	Record
1	October 6	Philadelphia	129–95	Otto Porter (22)	Garrett Temple (9)	John Wall (9)	Verizon Center; 11,670	1–0
2	October 9	New York	104–115	Marcin Gortat (15)	Bradley Beal (8)	Sessions, Wall (4)	Verizon Center; 14,267	1–1
3	October 11	Bauru	134–100	Marcin Gortat (19)	Kris Humphries (9)	John Wall (9)	Verizon Center; 10,233	2–1
4	October 16	@ Philadelphia	127–118	Gortat, Oubre Jr. (16)	DeJuan Blair (7)	John Wall (14)	Wells Fargo Center; 10,798	3–1
5	October 17	@ Milwaukee	105–101	Marcin Gortat (16)	DeJuan Blair (14)	Ramon Sessions (11)	BMO Harris Bradley Center; 4,716	4–1
6	October 21	@ Miami	105–110	Marcin Gortat (18)	Marcin Gortat (13)	John Wall (7)	American Airlines Arena; 19,600	4–2
7	October 23	@ Toronto	82–92	Marcin Gortat (16)	Kris Humphries (14)	John Wall (8)	Bell Centre; 20,072	4–3

2015–16 season schedule

Southeast Division	W	L	PCT	GB	Home	Road	Div	GP
y – Miami Heat	48	34	.585	–	28‍–‍13	20‍–‍21	10–6	82
x – Atlanta Hawks	48	34	.585	–	27‍–‍14	21‍–‍20	8–8	82
x – Charlotte Hornets	48	34	.585	–	30‍–‍11	18‍–‍23	8–8	82
e – Washington Wizards	41	41	.500	7.0	22‍–‍19	19‍–‍22	10–6	82
e – Orlando Magic	35	47	.427	13.0	23‍–‍18	12‍–‍29	4–12	82

Eastern Conference
#	Team	W	L	PCT	GB	GP
1	c – Cleveland Cavaliers *	57	25	.695	–	82
2	y – Toronto Raptors *	56	26	.683	1.0	82
3	y – Miami Heat *	48	34	.585	9.0	82
4	x – Atlanta Hawks	48	34	.585	9.0	82
5	x – Boston Celtics	48	34	.585	9.0	82
6	x – Charlotte Hornets	48	34	.585	9.0	82
7	x – Indiana Pacers	45	37	.549	12.0	82
8	x – Detroit Pistons	44	38	.537	13.0	82
9	e – Chicago Bulls	42	40	.512	15.0	82
10	e – Washington Wizards	41	41	.500	16.0	82
11	e – Orlando Magic	35	47	.427	22.0	82
12	e – Milwaukee Bucks	33	49	.402	24.0	82
13	e – New York Knicks	32	50	.390	25.0	82
14	e – Brooklyn Nets	21	61	.256	36.0	82
15	e – Philadelphia 76ers	10	72	.122	47.0	82

== Regular season game log ==
2015–16 game log
Total: 41–41 (Home: 22–19; Road: 19–22)
October: 2–1 (home: 0–1; road: 2–0)

Game	Date	Team	Score	High points	High rebounds	High assists	Location Attendance	Record
1	October 28	@ Orlando	W 88–87	Bradley Beal (24)	Gortat, Porter (8)	John Wall (6)	Amway Center; 18,846	1–0
2	October 30	@ Milwaukee	W 118–113	Bradley Beal (31)	Marcin Gortat (15)	John Wall (14)	BMO Harris Bradley Center; 13,858	2–0
3	October 31	New York	L 77–97	Bradley Beal (26)	Drew Gooden (11)	John Wall (7)	Verizon Center; 20,356	2–1

November : 4–7 (home: 3–3; road: 1–4)

Game	Date	Team	Score	High points	High rebounds	High assists	Location Attendance	Record
4	November 4	San Antonio	W 102–99	Bradley Beal (45)	Marcin Gortat (10)	John Wall (17)	Verizon Center; 17,721	3–1
5	November 6	@ Boston	L 98–118	Bradley Beal (23)	Marcin Gortat (12)	John Wall (9)	TD Garden; 18,624	3–2
6	November 7	@ Atlanta	L 95–97	Otto Porter (21)	Marcin Gortat (10)	John Wall (12)	Philips Arena; 18,047	3–3
7	November 10	Oklahoma City	L 87–92	Gortat, Sessions (27)	DeJuan Blair (12)	Sessions, Wall (7)	Verizon Center; 20,356	3–4
8	November 14	Orlando	W 108–99	Kris Humphries (23)	Gortat, Porter (10)	John Wall (11)	Verizon Center; 18,311	4–4
9	November 17	Milwaukee	W 115–86	Porter, Wall (19)	Marcin Gortat (9)	John Wall (9)	Verizon Center; 15,485	5–4
10	November 21	@ Detroit	W 97–95	Nenê (18)	Marcin Gortat (8)	John Wall (7)	The Palace of Auburn Hills; 15,890	6–4
11	November 24	Indiana	L 106–123	Gary Neal (23)	Marcin Gortat (9)	John Wall (5)	Verizon Center; 15,890	6–5
12	November 25	@ Charlotte	L 87–101	Gortat, Wall (17)	Marcin Gortat (12)	John Wall (6)	Time Warner Cable Arena; 17,064	6–6
13	November 27	@ Boston	L 78–111	Jared Dudley (19)	Marcin Gortat (9)	John Wall (6)	TD Garden; 18,624	6–7
14	November 28	Toronto	L 82–84	Bradley Beal (20)	Marcin Gortat (10)	Bradley Beal (6)	Verizon Center; 16,841	6–8

December : 8–8 (home: 4–4; road: 4–4)

Game	Date	Team	Score	High points	High rebounds	High assists	Location Attendance	Record
15	December 1	@ Cleveland	W 97–85	John Wall (35)	Marcin Gortat (11)	John Wall (10)	Quicken Loans Arena; 20,562	7–8
16	December 2	L. A. Lakers	L 104–108	John Wall (34)	Marcin Gortat (10)	John Wall (11)	Verizon Center; 20,356	7–9
17	December 4	Phoenix	W 109–106	Bradley Beal (34)	Bradley Beal (9)	John Wall (9)	Verizon Center; 17,255	8–9
18	December 6	Dallas	L 104–116	John Wall (28)	Otto Porter Jr. (11)	John Wall (10)	Verizon Center; 16,394	8–10
19	December 7	@ Miami	W 114–103	John Wall (26)	Otto Porter Jr. (14)	John Wall (7)	AmericanAirlines Arena; 19,500	9–10
20	December 9	Houston	L 103–109	John Wall (26)	Marcin Gortat (13)	John Wall (12)	Verizon Center; 16,041	9–11
21	December 11	@ New Orleans	L 105–107	John Wall (26)	Marcin Gortat (8)	John Wall (12)	Smoothie King Center; 16,875	9–12
22	December 12	@ Dallas	W 114–111	John Wall (26)	Marcin Gortat (12)	John Wall (16)	American Airlines Center; 20,088	10–12
23	December 14	@ Memphis	L 95–112	Gary Neal (24)	Marcin Gortat (9)	John Wall (9)	FedExForum; 15,397	10–13
24	December 16	@ San Antonio	L 95–114	Gortat, Wall (20)	Marcin Gortat (10)	John Wall (11)	AT&T Center; 18,418	10–14
25	December 19	Charlotte	W 109–101	John Wall (27)	Jared Dudley (9)	John Wall (12)	Verizon Center; 16,987	11–14
26	December 21	Sacramento	W 113–99	Marcin Gortat (27)	Marcin Gortat (16)	John Wall (19)	Verizon Center; 15,124	12–14
27	December 23	Memphis	W 100–91	Garrett Temple (20)	Marcin Gortat (12)	John Wall (14)	Verizon Center; 15,879	13–14
28	December 26	@ Brooklyn	W 111–96	Marcin Gortat (25)	Gortat, Humphries (14)	John Wall (13)	Barclays Center; 17,732	14–14
29	December 28	L. A. Clippers	L 91–108	John Wall (23)	Marcin Gortat (16)	John Wall (12)	Verizon Center; 20,356	14–15
30	December 30	@ Toronto	L 91–94	Otto Porter Jr. (20)	Gortat, Porter Jr. (9)	John Wall (11)	Air Canada Centre; 19,800	14–16

January : 7–8 (home: 3–7; road: 4–1)

Game	Date	Team	Score	High points	High rebounds	High assists	Location Attendance	Record
31	January 1	Orlando	W 103–91	John Wall (24)	Marcin Gortat (14)	John Wall (13)	Verizon Center; 16,986	15–16
32	January 3	Miami	L 75–97	John Wall (14)	Marcin Gortat (13)	Sessions, Wall (5)	Verizon Center; 17,793	15–17
33	January 6	Cleveland	L 115–121	Garrett Temple (21)	Otto Porter Jr. (7)	John Wall (12)	Verizon Center; 20,356	15–18
34	January 8	Toronto	L 88–97	John Wall (21)	Marcin Gortat (10)	Dudley, Wall (4)	Verizon Center; 17,064	15–19
35	January 9	@ Orlando	W 105–99	John Wall (24)	Marcin Gortat (10)	John Wall (10)	Amway Center; 18,058	16–19
36	January 11	@ Chicago	W 114–100	John Wall (17)	Drew Gooden (12)	John Wall (10)	United Center; 21,409	17–19
37	January 13	Milwaukee	W 106–101	John Wall (19)	Jared Dudley (6)	John Wall (8)	Verizon Center; 16,248	18–19
38	January 15	@ Indiana	W 118–104	John Wall (28)	Nenê (8)	John Wall (8)	Bankers Life Fieldhouse; 18,165	19–19
39	January 16	Boston	L 117–119	John Wall (36)	Marcin Gortat (11)	John Wall (13)	Verizon Center; 20,356	19–20
40	January 18	Portland	L 98–108	Garrett Temple (18)	Marcin Gortat (13)	John Wall (10)	Verizon Center; 17,236	19–21
41	January 20	Miami	W 106–87	Beal, Wall (18)	Marcin Gortat (12)	John Wall (10)	Verizon Center; 17,008	20–21
42	January 25	Boston	L 91–116	Dudley, Porter Jr. (15)	Marcin Gortat (11)	John Wall (10)	Verizon Center; 11,753	20–22
43	January 26	@ Toronto	L 89–106	John Wall (18)	Gortat, Porter Jr. (8)	John Wall (14)	Air Canada Centre; 19,800	20–23
44	January 28	Denver	L 113–117	Garrett Temple (20)	Marcin Gortat (10)	John Wall (9)	Verizon Center; 15,146	20–24
45	January 30	@ Houston	W 123–122	John Wall (19)	Marcin Gortat (11)	John Wall (13)	Toyota Center; 18,320	21–24

February : 8–6 (home: 6–1; road: 2–5)

Game	Date	Team	Score	High points	High rebounds	High assists	Location Attendance	Record
46	February 1	@ Oklahoma City	L 95–110	Bradley Beal (18)	Marcin Gortat (6)	John Wall (8)	Chesapeake Energy Arena; 18,203	21–25
47	February 3	Golden State	L 121–134	John Wall (41)	Marcin Gortat (8)	John Wall (10)	Verizon Center; 20,356	21–26
48	February 5	Philadelphia	W 106–94	Bradley Beal (22)	Gortat, Wall (13)	John Wall (10)	Verizon Center; 17,305	22–26
49	February 6	@ Charlotte	L 104–108	John Wall (23)	Marcin Gortat (13)	John Wall (10)	Time Warner Cable Arena; 18,450	22–27
50	February 9	@ New York	W 111–108	John Wall (28)	Marcin Gortat (10)	John Wall (17)	Madison Square Garden; 19,812	23–27
51	February 11	@ Milwaukee	L 92–99	Bradley Beal (19)	Marcin Gortat (10)	John Wall (10)	BMO Harris Bradley Center; 14,172	23–28
All-Star Break
52	February 18	Utah	W 103–89	Marcin Gortat (22)	Marcin Gortat (10)	John Wall (11)	Verizon Center; 12,415	24–28
53	February 19	Detroit	W 98–86	John Wall (22)	Marcin Gortat (9)	John Wall (8)	Verizon Center; 20,356	25–28
54	February 20	@ Miami	L 94–114	Jared Dudley (16)	Marcin Gortat (13)	John Wall (4)	American Airlines Arena; 19,710	25–29
55	February 23	New Orleans	W 109–89	Marcin Gortat (21)	John Wall (12)	John Wall (11)	Verizon Center; 15,743	26–29
56	February 24	@ Chicago	L 105–109	Bradley Beal (19)	Markieff Morris (10)	John Wall (7)	United Center; 21,560	26–30
57	February 26	@ Philadelphia	W 103–94	John Wall (23)	Marcin Gortat (11)	John Wall (11)	Wells Fargo Center; 16,511	27–30
58	February 28	Cleveland	W 113–99	Porter Jr., Wall (21)	Marcin Gortat (9)	John Wall (13)	Verizon Center; 20,356	28–30
59	February 29	Philadelphia	W 116–108	John Wall (37)	Marcin Gortat (20)	John Wall (7)	Verizon Center; 15,096	29–30

March : 7–9 (home: 3–3; road: 4–6)

Game	Date	Team	Score	High points	High rebounds	High assists	Location Attendance	Record
60	March 2	@ Minnesota	W 104–98	Bradley Beal (26)	Markieff Morris (6)	John Wall (12)	Target Center; 11,307	30-30
61	March 4	@ Cleveland	L 83–108	John Wall (17)	Marcin Gortat (9)	John Wall (7)	Quicken Loans Arena; 20,562	30–31
62	March 5	Indiana	L 99–100	John Wall (25)	Marcin Gortat (17)	John Wall (12)	Verizon Center; 20,356	30–32
63	March 8	@ Portland	L 108–116 (OT)	John Wall (20)	Marcin Gortat (10)	John Wall (11)	Moda Center; 19,393	30–33
64	March 11	@ Utah	L 93–114	John Wall (24)	Gortat, Morris, Sessions, Wall (4)	John Wall (9)	Vivint Smart Home Arena; 19,911	30–34
65	March 12	@ Denver	L 100–116	Otto Porter Jr. (23)	Markieff Morris (6)	John Wall (11)	Pepsi Center; 13,213	30–35
66	March 14	Detroit	W 124–81	Nenê (20)	Gortat, Porter Jr. (6)	John Wall (12)	Verizon Center; 18,042	31–35
67	March 16	Chicago	W 117–96	John Wall (29)	John Wall (10)	John Wall (12)	Verizon Center; 19,556	32–35
68	March 17	@ Philadelphia	W 99–94	John Wall (16)	Gortat, Wall (13)	John Wall (14)	Wells Fargo Center; 10,521	33–35
69	March 19	New York	W 99–89	John Wall (24)	Marcin Gortat (11)	John Wall (10)	Verizon Center; 20,356	34–35
70	March 21	@ Atlanta	W 117–102	John Wall (27)	Porter Jr. (10)	John Wall (14)	Philips Arena; 15,729	35–35
71	March 23	Atlanta	L 101–122	Marcus Thornton (23)	Marcin Gortat (14)	John Wall (10)	Verizon Center; 18,807	35–36
72	March 25	Minnesota	L 129–132 (2OT)	Bradley Beal (26)	Marcin Gortat (14)	John Wall (16)	Verizon Center; 20,356	35–37
73	March 27	@ L. A. Lakers	W 101–88	John Wall (22)	Marcin Gortat (10)	John Wall (13)	Staples Center; 18,997	36–37
74	March 29	@ Golden State	L 94–102	Bradley Beal (17)	Marcin Gortat (11)	John Wall (11)	Oracle Arena; 19,596	36–38
75	March 30	@ Sacramento	L 111–120	Bradley Beal (24)	Marcin Gortat (12)	John Wall (13)	Sleep Train Arena; 17,185	36–39

April : 5–2 (home: 3–0; road: 2–2)

Game	Date	Team	Score	High points	High rebounds	High assists	Location Attendance	Record
76	April 1	@ Phoenix	W 106–99	John Wall (22)	Marcin Gortat (11)	John Wall (10)	Talking Stick Resort Arena; 17,345	37–39
77	April 3	@ L. A. Clippers	L 109–114	Marcin Gortat (21)	Nenê (9)	John Wall (13)	Staples Center; 19,060	37–40
78	April 6	Brooklyn	W 121–103	Bradley Beal (25)	Marcin Gortat (12)	Ramon Sessions (13)	Verizon Center; 16,846	38–40
79	April 8	@ Detroit	L 99–112	Markieff Morris (29)	Otto Porter Jr. (8)	Ramon Sessions (6)	The Palace of Auburn Hills; 18,207	38–41
80	April 10	Charlotte	W 113–98	Marcin Gortat (21)	Marcin Gortat (13)	Ramon Sessions (11)	Verizon Center; 19,187	39–41
81	April 11	@ Brooklyn	W 120–111	Ramon Sessions (21)	Marcin Gortat (8)	Ramon Sessions (12)	Barclays Center; 14,653	40–41
82	April 13	Atlanta	W 109–98	Ramon Sessions (22)	J.J. Hickson (12)	Nenê (8)	Verizon Center; 17,399	41–41

2015–16 season schedule

== Player statistics ==
Legend
GP	Games played	GS	Games started	MPG	Minutes per game
FG%	Field-goal percentage	3P%	3-point field-goal percentage	FT%	Free-throw percentage
RPG	Rebounds per game	APG	Assists per game	SPG	Steals per game
BPG	Blocks per game	PPG	Points per game

=== Regular season ===
Washington Wizards statistics
Player	GP	GS	MPG	FG%	3P%	FT%	RPG	APG	SPG	BPG	PPG
Ramon Sessions	82	5	20.3	.473	.324	.756	2.5	2.9	.6	.1	9.9
Jared Dudley	81	41	25.9	.478	.420	.735	3.5	2.1	.9	.2	7.9
Garrett Temple	80	43	24.4	.398	.345	.728	2.7	1.8	.9	.2	7.3
John Wall	77	77	36.2	.424	.351	.791	4.9	10.2	1.9	.8	19.9
Marcin Gortat	75	74	30.1	.567	.000	.705	9.9	1.4	.6	1.3	13.5
Otto Porter Jr.	75	73	30.3	.473	.367	.754	5.2	1.6	1.4	.4	11.6
Kelly Oubre Jr.	63	9	10.7	.427	.316	.633	2.1	.2	.3	.1	3.7
Nenê	57	11	19.2	.544	.000	.578	4.5	1.7	.9	.5	9.2
Bradley Beal	55	35	31.1	.449	.387	.767	3.4	2.9	1.0	.2	17.4
Gary Neal	40	2	20.2	.465	.410	.855	2.1	1.2	.5	.0	9.8
Drew Gooden	30	0	10.2	.320	.171	.643	2.8	.4	.3	.4	2.7
DeJuan Blair	29	0	7.5	.412	.000	.385	2.0	.4	.3	.1	2.1
Kris Humphries^{†}	28	14	16.6	.405	.343	.935	4.1	.6	.1	.5	6.4
Markieff Morris^{†}	27	21	26.4	.467	.316	.764	5.9	1.4	.9	.6	12.4
Jarell Eddie	26	0	5.7	.308	.319	1.000	.9	.2	.2	.0	2.4
JJ Hickson^{†}	15	0	8.7	.543	.000	.432	3.0	.5	.3	.1	4.6
Marcus Thornton^{†}	14	2	16.0	.393	.333	.762	2.5	1.4	.9	.1	8.4
Alan Anderson	13	0	14.8	.356	.324	.733	2.1	1.1	.3	.1	5.0
Ryan Hollins^{†}	5	3	9.6	.571			2.2	.0	.0	.2	1.6

- ^{†} Denotes player spent time with another team in the season. Stats reflect time with the Wizards only.

== Transactions ==
=== Trades ===
June 25, 2015	To Atlanta Hawks Tim Hardaway Jr. (from New York); Two future second-round picks (from Washington)	To New York Knicks Draft rights to Jerian Grant (from Washington)
June 25, 2015	To Washington Wizards Draft rights to Kelly Oubre, Jr. (from Atlanta)
July 9, 2015	To Washington Wizards Jared Dudley	To Milwaukee Bucks Protected Future second-round draft pick
February 18, 2016	To Washington Wizards Markieff Morris	To Phoenix Suns DeJuan Blair; Kris Humphries; 2016 Top-9 Protected first-round pick

=== Free agents ===
==== Re-signed ====
Player	Date Signed	Contract	Ref.
Drew Gooden	July 13, 2015	Signed 2-year contract worth $6.8 million	

==== Additions ====
Player	Date Signed	Contract	Former Team	Ref.
Gary Neal	July 9, 2015	Signed 1-year contract worth $2.1 million	Minnesota Timberwolves	
Alan Anderson	July 12, 2015	Signed 1-year contract worth $4 million	Brooklyn Nets	
Jarell Eddie	December 23, 2015	(non-guaranteed) 2-year contract worth $1.5 million	Austin Spurs	
J.J. Hickson	February 25, 2016	Signed for remainder of 2015–16 season at $366,337	Denver Nuggets	
Marcus Thornton	March 9, 2016	Signed for remainder of 2015–16 season at $251,107	Houston Rockets	

==== Subtractions ====
Player	Reason Left	Date Signed	Contract	New Team	Ref.
Paul Pierce	Opted out of final year	July 10, 2015	Signed 3-year contract worth $10 million	Los Angeles Clippers	
Kevin Seraphin	Accepted Qualifying Offer	August 6, 2015	Signed 1-year contract worth $2.8 million	New York Knicks	
Martell Webster	Waived				
Gary Neal	Waived				
