= Jarell Eddie =

American basketball player (born 1991)

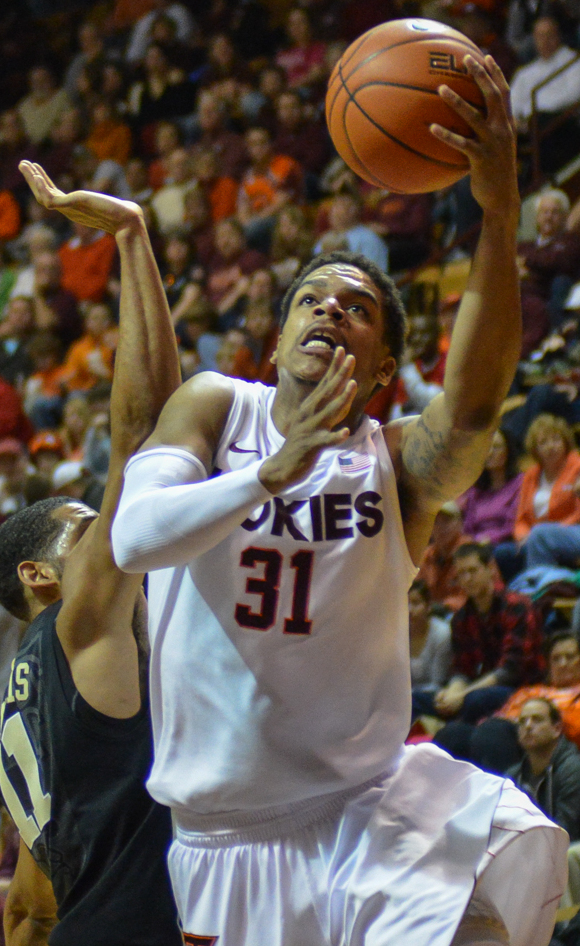
- Eddie with Virginia Tech in January 2013

No. 31 – Calor de Cancún
- Position: Small forward / power forward
- League: LNBP

Personal information
- Born: October 30, 1991 (age 34) Tampa, Florida, U.S.
- Listed height: 6 ft 7 in (2.01 m)
- Listed weight: 220 lb (100 kg)

Career information
- High school: Cannon School (Concord, North Carolina)
- College: Virginia Tech (2010–2014)
- NBA draft: 2014: undrafted
- Playing career: 2014–present

Career history
- 2014–2015: Austin Spurs
- 2015–2016: Washington Wizards
- 2016–2017: Austin Spurs
- 2017: Windy City Bulls
- 2017: Phoenix Suns
- 2017–2018: Windy City Bulls
- 2018: Boston Celtics
- 2018: Chicago Bulls
- 2018–2019: SIG Strasbourg
- 2019–2020: Murcia
- 2020–2021: Fenerbahçe
- 2021–2022: SIG Strasbourg
- 2022: San Pablo Burgos
- 2022–2023: Konyaspor
- 2023–2024: U-BT Cluj-Napoca
- 2024–2025: Peristeri
- 2025: Santeros de Aguada
- 2025–2026: Al-Ittihad Jeddah
- 2026: Pioneros Del Avila
- 2026: Vancouver Bandits
- 2026–present: El Calor de Cancún

Career highlights
- Romanian League champion (2024); Romanian Cup winner (2024); Romanian Cup Finals MVP (2024); Leaders Cup winner (2019); Leaders Cup MVP (2019); NBA D-League Three-Point Contest champion (2015)
- Stats at NBA.com
- Stats at Basketball Reference
Medals
Men's basketball
Representing the United States
FIBA AmeriCup
Bronze medal – third place	2025 Managua

Jarell Alexander Eddie (born October 30, 1991) is an American professional basketball player for El Calor de Cancún of the Liga Nacional de Baloncesto Profesional (LNBP). He played college basketball for the Virginia Tech Hokies before playing parts of four NBA seasons for the Washington Wizards, Phoenix Suns, Chicago Bulls and Boston Celtics, totalling 34 games between 2015 to 2018.

Eddie went on to build a career overseas, helping lead French club SIG Strasbourg to a Leaders Cup championship while earning MVP honors in 2019, and helping U-BT Cluj-Napoca win the Romanian League and Romanian Cup while earning Romanian Cup Finals MVP in 2024. His career includes stops in Spain, Turkey, Greece, Puerto Rico, Saudi Arabia, and Mexico.

== High school career ==
Eddie attended the Cannon School in Concord, North Carolina, where he was a five-year letter winner for coach Ron Johnson. He scored 2,600 points in his high school career and was an all-conference selection all five years. He was also an all-state selection as a sophomore, junior and senior. As a junior in 2008–09, he averaged 25 points and 8 rebounds per game while leading the Cougars to a co-conference championship in its first year in the Charlotte Independent Schools Athletic Association (CISAA).

In November 2009, Eddie signed a National Letter of Intent to play college basketball for Virginia Tech. He went on to participate in the 2010 Capital Classic, and was ranked nationally #63 by Rivals.com and #77 by Scout.com.

== College career ==
As a freshman at Virginia Tech in 2010–11, Eddie had a subdued role as he averaged just 2.9 points, 2.2 rebounds and 10.9 minutes in 27 games (no starts). He later missed the postseason due to a violation of team rules.

As a sophomore in 2011–12, Eddie appeared in all 33 games with 32 starting assignments. He ranked third on the team in scoring at 9.1 points per game and led the team in scoring on four occasions. He also led the team in three-pointers made (54), three-point percentage (44.3) and free-throw percentage (86.8). In addition, he averaged 4.8 rebounds and 1.4 assists per game.

As a junior in 2012–13, Eddie was named to the ACC All-Academic team. In 32 games (28 starts), he averaged 12.3 points, 5.6 rebounds and 1.3 assists in 30.3 minutes per game.

As a senior in 2013–14, Eddie was named to the ACC All-Academic team for the second straight year. On December 9, 2013, he was named the ACC Player of the Week after he led the Hokies to a pair of wins, including a 61–60 overtime road victory against the defending ACC champion Miami. He scored 24 points against Miami and a career-high 34 points in an 81–63 win over Winthrop. With his first three-pointer in the 72–52 loss to Syracuse on January 7, 2014, Eddie became the 44th player in school history to score 1,000 career points. He finished the 2013–14 season with averages of 13.3 points, 5.4 rebounds and 1.2 assists in 31 games (30 starts).

== Professional career ==
=== 2014–15 season ===
After going undrafted in the 2014 NBA draft, Eddie played for the Washington Wizards in the 2014 NBA Summer League. He signed with the Atlanta Hawks on September 29, 2014, but was waived on October 21 after appearing in three preseason games. He was claimed off waivers by the Boston Celtics on October 23, only to be waived again four days later.

On October 30, 2014, Eddie was acquired by the Fort Wayne Mad Ants of the NBA Development League as an affiliate player of the Atlanta Hawks. He was traded to the Austin Spurs two days later. On February 15, 2015, he won the NBA D-League Three-Point Contest during the league's All-Star weekend festivities.

On March 5, 2015, Eddie signed a 10-day contract with the Atlanta Hawks. He parted ways with the Hawks on March 14 before appearing in a game for them after the team decided not to re-sign him to a second 10-day contract. He subsequently returned to the Austin Spurs, where he played out the season. In 50 games for the Spurs in 2014–15, he averaged 13.0 points and 3.6 rebounds per game.

=== 2015–16 season ===
In July 2015, Eddie joined the Indiana Pacers for the Orlando Summer League and the San Antonio Spurs for the Las Vegas Summer League. He later joined the Golden State Warriors for training camp and preseason.

On October 30, 2015, Eddie was reacquired by the Austin Spurs. On December 23, 2015, he signed with the Washington Wizards. He made his NBA debut three days later, recording 12 points and four rebounds in the Wizards' 111–96 win over the Brooklyn Nets. Signed for his three-point shooting, Eddie went 4-of-5 from three-point range during his debut game. He played out the 2015–16 season with Washington, averaging 2.4 points in 26 games.

=== 2016–17 season ===
After playing for the Washington Wizards during the NBA Summer League and preseason, he was waived on October 21, 2016.

On October 29, 2016, Eddie was reacquired by the Austin Spurs. On January 25, 2017, he was traded to the Windy City Bulls in exchange for Hollis Thompson.

On March 19, 2017, Eddie signed a 10-day contract with the Phoenix Suns. He made his debut for the Suns later that day, playing 29 minutes and scoring 13 points with two 3-pointers in a 112–95 loss to the Detroit Pistons. He signed a second 10-day contract with the Suns on March 29. He parted ways with the Suns following the expiration of his second 10-day contract.

=== 2017–18 season ===
After spending preseason with the Chicago Bulls, Eddie re-joined the Windy City Bulls for the 2017–18 NBA G League season.

On January 20, 2018, Eddie signed a 10-day contract with the Boston Celtics. He returned to Windy City on January 30 after not receiving a second 10-day contract from the Celtics. On March 1, 2018, he signed a 10-day contract with the Chicago Bulls. After the 10-day contract expired, he finished the season with Windy City.

=== 2018–19 season ===
After playing for the Boston Celtics in the 2018 NBA Summer League, Eddie signed with SIG Strasbourg of the LNB Pro A on November 4, 2018. He helped SIG Strasbourg win the 2019 Pro A Leaders Cup while earning Leaders Cup MVP honors. He averaged 11.2 points and 4.5 rebounds per game during the 2018–19 season.

=== 2019–20 season ===
On July 3, 2019, Eddie signed with UCAM Murcia of the Liga ACB. He averaged 14.3 points per game shooting 44% from three-point range.

=== 2020–21 season ===
On July 27, 2020, Eddie signed with Fenerbahçe Beko of the Turkish Basketball Super League and EuroLeague. He parted ways with Fenerbahçe on June 30, 2021, after averaging 5.9 points in EuroLeague and 13.2 points in BSL.

=== 2021–22 season ===
On September 7, 2021, Eddie signed with SIG Strasbourg of the LNB Pro A, returning to the team for a second stint. He made six appearances for Strasbourg between December 18 and January 12.

On January 13, 2022, Eddie signed with San Pablo Burgos of the Spanish Liga ACB.

=== 2022–23 season ===
On August 7, 2022, Eddie signed with Konyaspor of the Turkish Basketball Super League.

=== 2023–24 season ===
On July 28, 2023, Eddie signed with U-BT Cluj-Napoca of the Liga Națională. He helped the team win the Romanian Cup and was named MVP of the finals.

=== 2024–25 season ===
On August 17, 2024, Eddie signed with Peristeri of the Greek Basketball League.

Eddie played for Santeros de Aguada of the Baloncesto Superior Nacional during the 2025 season.

=== 2025–26 season ===
For the 2025–26 season, Eddie joined Al-Ittihad Jeddah of the Saudi Premier League.

In April 2026, Eddie joined Pioneros Del Avila of the Superliga Profesional de Baloncesto in Venezuela.

In July 2026, Eddie joined the Vancouver Bandits of the Canadian Elite Basketball League (CEBL).

=== 2026–27 season ===
In September 2026, Eddie joined El Calor de Cancún of the Liga Nacional de Baloncesto Profesional (LNBP).

== Career statistics ==
=== NBA ===
Legend
GP	Games played	GS	Games started	MPG	Minutes per game
FG%	Field goal percentage	3P%	3-point field goal percentage	FT%	Free throw percentage
RPG	Rebounds per game	APG	Assists per game	SPG	Steals per game
BPG	Blocks per game	PPG	Points per game	**Bold**	Career high

==== Regular season ====
Year	Team	GP	GS	MPG	FG%	3P%	FT%	RPG	APG	SPG	BPG	PPG
2015–16	Washington	26	0	5.7	.308	.319	1.000	.9	.2	.2	.0	2.4
2016–17	Phoenix	5	0	12.5	.316	.250	.889	1.4	.0	.2	.0	4.8
2017–18	Boston	2	0	2.8	.000	.000	–	.5	–	.5	–	0.0
2017–18	Chicago	1	0	3.0	.000	.000	–	–	–	–	–	0.0
Career		34	0	6.4	.302	.292	.941	.9	.2	.2	.0	2.6

=== College ===
Year	Team	GP	GS	MPG	FG%	3P%	FT%	RPG	APG	SPG	BPG	PPG
2010–11	Virginia Tech	27	0	10.9	.368	.219	.688	2.2	.5	.1	.3	2.9
2011–12	Virginia Tech	**33**	**32**	27.3	**.425**	**.443**	**.868**	4.8	**1.4**	**.5**	.4	9.1
2012–13	Virginia Tech	32	28	30.3	.396	.321	.842	**5.6**	1.3	.3	**.8**	12.3
2013–14	Virginia Tech	31	30	**32.6**	.355	.376	.778	5.4	1.2	.4	.4	**13.3**
**Career**		123	90	25.8	.385	.365	.812	4.6	1.1	.3	.5	9.6

== Personal life ==
Eddie is the son of Angela and Jessie Eddie, and has two brothers and a sister.
