= 2015–16 Detroit Pistons season =

NBA team season

- Head coach: Stan Van Gundy
- President: Stan Van Gundy
- General manager: Jeff Bower
- Owner: Tom Gores
- Arena: The Palace of Auburn Hills

Results
- Record: 44–38 (.537)
- Place: Division: 3rd (Central); Conference: 8th (Eastern)
- Playoff finish: First Round (lost to Cavaliers 0–4)
- Stats at Basketball Reference

The 2015–16 Detroit Pistons season was the 75th season of the franchise, the 68th in the National Basketball Association (NBA), and the 59th in the Detroit suburban area. This season marked the first time the Pistons qualified for the NBA playoffs since the 2008–09 season, and also marked their first winning season since the 2007–08 season. It would be their last until the 2024–25 season. The Pistons would also end their record as the team in the Eastern Conference with the longest active postseason drought at seven seasons. The Pistons were the first team with a winning percentage above .500 at the Eastern Conference's 8th seed since the 2011–12 Philadelphia 76ers.

In the playoffs, the Pistons were swept by the eventual NBA champion Cleveland Cavaliers in four games in the First Round.

The Pistons did not make another playoff appearance until 2019.

== Draft picks ==
Round	Pick	Player	Position	Nationality	College/Team
1	8	Stanley Johnson	SF	United States	Arizona
2	38	Darrun Hilliard	SG	United States	Villanova

== Roster ==
2015–16 Detroit Pistons roster
Players

Pos.	No.	Player	Height	Weight	DOB	From
C	50	Joel Anthony	6 ft 9 in (2.06 m)	245 lb (111 kg)	1982–08–09	UNLV
C	12	Aron Baynes	6 ft 10 in (2.08 m)	260 lb (118 kg)	1986–12–09	Washington State
G	22	Steve Blake	6 ft 3 in (1.91 m)	172 lb (78 kg)	1980–02–26	Maryland
G	17	Lorenzo Brown	6 ft 5 in (1.96 m)	189 lb (86 kg)	1990–08–26	NC State
G	25	Reggie Bullock	6 ft 6 in (1.98 m)	205 lb (93 kg)	1991–03–16	North Carolina
G	5	Kentavious Caldwell-Pope	6 ft 5 in (1.96 m)	205 lb (93 kg)	1993–02–18	Georgia
G	8	Spencer Dinwiddie	6 ft 5 in (1.96 m)	200 lb (91 kg)	1993–04–06	Colorado
C	0	Andre Drummond	6 ft 10 in (2.08 m)	279 lb (127 kg)	1993–08–10	Connecticut
F	34	Tobias Harris	6 ft 8 in (2.03 m)	235 lb (107 kg)	1992–07–15	Tennessee
G	6	Darrun Hilliard	6 ft 6 in (1.98 m)	205 lb (93 kg)	1993–04–13	Villanova
G	1	Reggie Jackson	6 ft 3 in (1.91 m)	208 lb (94 kg)	1990–04–16	Boston College
F	3	Stanley Johnson	6 ft 7 in (2.01 m)	245 lb (111 kg)	1996–05–29	Arizona
G	20	Jodie Meeks	6 ft 4 in (1.93 m)	210 lb (95 kg)	1987–08–21	Kentucky
F	13	Marcus Morris	6 ft 8 in (2.03 m)	235 lb (107 kg)	1989–09–02	Kansas
F	43	Anthony Tolliver	6 ft 8 in (2.03 m)	240 lb (109 kg)	1985–06–01	Creighton

Coaches
Head coach
- Stan Van Gundy
Assistant(s)
- Malik Allen
- Bob Beyer
- Aaron Gray
- Tim Hardaway
- Charles Klask
- Brendan Malone

Legend
- (DP) Unsigned draft pick
- (FA) Free agent
- (S) Suspended
- (DL) On assignment to D-League affiliate
- Injured

Roster
Updated: 2016–04–13

== Standings ==
=== Division ===
Central Division	W	L	PCT	GB	Home	Road	Div	GP
c – Cleveland Cavaliers	57	25	.695	–	33‍–‍8	24‍–‍17	8–8	82
x – Indiana Pacers	45	37	.549	12.0	26‍–‍15	19‍–‍22	8–8	82
x – Detroit Pistons	44	38	.537	13.0	26‍–‍15	18‍–‍23	10–6	82
e – Chicago Bulls	42	40	.512	15.0	26‍–‍15	16‍–‍25	10–6	82
e – Milwaukee Bucks	33	49	.402	24.0	23‍–‍18	10‍–‍31	4–12	82

=== Conference ===
Eastern Conference
#	Team	W	L	PCT	GB	GP
1	c – Cleveland Cavaliers *	57	25	.695	–	82
2	y – Toronto Raptors *	56	26	.683	1.0	82
3	y – Miami Heat *	48	34	.585	9.0	82
4	x – Atlanta Hawks	48	34	.585	9.0	82
5	x – Boston Celtics	48	34	.585	9.0	82
6	x – Charlotte Hornets	48	34	.585	9.0	82
7	x – Indiana Pacers	45	37	.549	12.0	82
8	x – Detroit Pistons	44	38	.537	13.0	82
9	e – Chicago Bulls	42	40	.512	15.0	82
10	e – Washington Wizards	41	41	.500	16.0	82
11	e – Orlando Magic	35	47	.427	22.0	82
12	e – Milwaukee Bucks	33	49	.402	24.0	82
13	e – New York Knicks	32	50	.390	25.0	82
14	e – Brooklyn Nets	21	61	.256	36.0	82
15	e – Philadelphia 76ers	10	72	.122	47.0	82

== Pre-season ==
2015 pre-season game log
Total: 3–5 (home: 1–3 Road: 2–2)
Pre-season: 3–5 (home: 1–3; road: 2–2)

Game	Date	Team	Score	High points	High rebounds	High assists	Location Attendance	Record
1	October 6	Indiana	L 112–115	Stanley Johnson (26)	Andre Drummond (9)	Caldwell-Pope, Dinwiddie, Johnson & Bullock (4)	The Palace of Auburn Hills; 10,446	0–1
2	October 8	Brooklyn	L 83–93	Ersan İlyasova (15)	Andre Drummond (11)	Reggie Jackson (6)	The Palace of Auburn Hills; 10,019	0–2
3	October 10	@ Milwaukee	W 117–88	Marcus Morris (21)	Andre Drummond (7)	Jackson & Dinwiddie (8)	BMO Harris Bradley Center; 7,350	1–2
4	October 13	@ Indiana	L 97–101	Drummond, Jackson & İlyasova (17)	Andre Drummond (21)	Reggie Jackson (7)	Bankers Life Fieldhouse; 12,730	1–3
5	October 14	@ Chicago	W 114–91	Reggie Jackson (20)	Andre Drummond (10)	Johnson, Tolliver, Bullock, Dinwiddie & Meeks (4)	United Center; 21,713	2–3
6	October 18	@ San Antonio	L 92–96	Reggie Jackson (20)	Andre Drummond (15)	Reggie Jackson (9)	AT&T Center; 17,396	2–4
7	October 21	Charlotte	L 94–99	Andre Drummond (21)	Andre Drummond (15)	Reggie Jackson (11)	The Palace of Auburn Hills; 11,096	2–5
8	October 23	Atlanta	W 115–87	Stanley Johnson (20)	Marcus Morris (10)	Steve Blake (12)	The Palace of Auburn Hills; 12,804	3–5

2015–16 season schedule

== Regular season ==
=== Game log ===
2015–16 game log
Total: 44–38 (home: 26–15; road: 18–23)
October: 3–0 (home: 2–0; road: 1–0)

Game	Date	Team	Score	High points	High rebounds	High assists	Location Attendance	Record
1	October 27	@ Atlanta	W 106–94	Kentavious Caldwell-Pope (21)	Andre Drummond (19)	Reggie Jackson (5)	Philips Arena; 19,187	1–0
2	October 28	Utah	W 92–87	Reggie Jackson (19)	Andre Drummond (10)	Steve Blake (7)	Palace of Auburn Hills; 18,434	2–0
3	October 30	Chicago	W 98–94 (OT)	Marcus Morris (26)	Andre Drummond (20)	Reggie Jackson (7)	Palace of Auburn Hills; 16,035	3–0

November : 6–9 (home: 3–2; road: 3–7)

Game	Date	Team	Score	High points	High rebounds	High assists	Location Attendance	Record
4	November 3	Indiana	L 82–94	Andre Drummond (25)	Andre Drummond (29)	Reggie Jackson (6)	Palace of Auburn Hills; 13,325	3–1
5	November 6	@ Phoenix	W 100–92	Reggie Jackson (23)	Andre Drummond (17)	Reggie Jackson (7)	Talking Stick Resort Arena; 16,676	4–1
6	November 8	@ Portland	W 120–103	Reggie Jackson (40)	Andre Drummond (27)	Reggie Jackson (5)	Moda Center; 19,393	5–1
7	November 9	@ Golden State	L 95–109	Jackson & Johnson (20)	Andre Drummond (15)	Reggie Jackson (5)	Oracle Arena; 19,596	5–2
8	November 11	@ Sacramento	L 92–101	Morris & Jackson (16)	Andre Drummond (17)	Anthony Tolliver (4)	Sleep Train Arena; 17,317	5–3
9	November 14	@ L.A. Clippers	L 96–101	İlyasova & Jackson (20)	Andre Drummond (19)	Reggie Jackson (5)	Staples Center; 19,060	5–4
10	November 15	@ L.A. Lakers	L 85–97	Drummond & Dinwiddie (17)	Andre Drummond (17)	Spencer Dinwiddie (4)	Staples Center; 18,997	5–5
11	November 17	Cleveland	W 104–99	Andre Drummond (25)	Andre Drummond (18)	Reggie Jackson (12)	Palace of Auburn Hills; 18,442	6–5
12	November 20	@ Minnesota	W 96–86	Andre Drummond (21)	Morris, Drummond & Baynes (11)	Reggie Jackson (5)	Target Center; 13,445	7–5
13	November 21	Washington	L 95–97	Reggie Jackson (20)	Andre Drummond (13)	Reggie Jackson (9)	Palace of Auburn Hills; 15,890	7–6
14	November 23	@ Milwaukee	L 88–109	Kentavious Caldwell-Pope (17)	Andre Drummond (15)	Reggie Jackson (7)	BMO Harris Bradley Center; 12,319	7–7
15	November 25	Miami	W 104–81	Drummond & Jackson (18)	Andre Drummond (20)	Reggie Jackson (7)	Palace of Auburn Hills; 15,119	8–7
16	November 27	@ Oklahoma City	L 87–103	Marcus Morris (17)	Andre Drummond (7)	Steve Blake (7)	Chesapeake Energy Arena; 18,203	8–8
17	November 29	@ Brooklyn	L 83–87	Kentavious Caldwell-Pope (21)	Andre Drummond (18)	Reggie Jackson (9)	Barclays Center; 12,823	8–9
18	November 30	Houston	W 116–105	Reggie Jackson (31)	Andre Drummond (13)	Reggie Jackson (8)	Palace of Auburn Hills; 14,818	9–9

December : 9–6 (home: 6–3; road: 3–3)

Game	Date	Team	Score	High points	High rebounds	High assists	Location Attendance	Record
19	December 2	Phoenix	W 127–122 (OT)	Reggie Jackson (34)	Marcus Morris (14)	Reggie Jackson (16)	Palace of Auburn Hills; 13,985	10–9
20	December 4	Milwaukee	W 102–95	Morris & Jackson (23)	Andre Drummond (23)	Reggie Jackson (5)	Palace of Auburn Hills; 16,963	11–9
21	December 6	L.A. Lakers	W 111–91	Kentavious Caldwell-Pope (22)	Andre Drummond (15)	Reggie Jackson (6)	Palace of Auburn Hills; 16,394	12–9
22	December 7	@ Charlotte	L 84–104	Kentavious Caldwell-Pope (16)	Ersan İlyasova (13)	Steve Blake (7)	Time Warner Cable Arena; 15,481	12–10
23	December 9	Memphis	L 92–93	Drummond & Jackson (18)	Andre Drummond (19)	Reggie Jackson (7)	Palace of Auburn Hills; 13,411	12–11
24	December 11	@ Philadelphia	W 107–95	Morris & Jackson (21)	Andre Drummond (16)	Morris, Jackson & Blake (4)	Wells Fargo Center; 14,020	13–11
25	December 12	Indiana	W 118–96	Reggie Jackson (21)	Andre Drummond (11)	Reggie Jackson (9)	Palace of Auburn Hills; 14,858	14–11
26	December 14	L.A. Clippers	L 103–105 (OT)	Reggie Jackson (34)	Andre Drummond (15)	Reggie Jackson (7)	Palace of Auburn Hills; 13,525	14–12
27	December 16	Boston	W 119–116	Kentavious Caldwell-Pope (31)	Andre Drummond (12)	Caldwell-Pope & Jackson (3)	Palace of Auburn Hills; 13,120	15–12
28	December 18	@ Chicago	W 147–144 (4OT)	Andre Drummond (33)	Andre Drummond (21)	Reggie Jackson (13)	United Center; 21,534	16–12
29	December 22	@ Miami	W 93–92	Reggie Jackson (18)	Andre Drummond (12)	Morris, Caldwell-Pope, Jackson & Johnson (3)	American Airlines Arena; 19,901	17–12
30	December 23	@ Atlanta	L 100–107	Andre Drummond (25)	Andre Drummond (12)	Reggie Jackson (7)	Philips Arena; 17,575	17–13
31	December 26	Boston	L 93–99	Andre Drummond (22)	Andre Drummond (22)	Steve Blake (6)	Palace of Auburn Hills; 18,288	17–14
32	December 29	@ New York	L 96–108	Ersan İlyasova (19)	Andre Drummond (9)	Reggie Jackson (9)	Madison Square Garden; 19,812	17–15
33	December 31	Minnesota	W 115–90	Andre Drummond (23)	Andre Drummond (18)	Reggie Jackson (9)	Palace of Auburn Hills; 15,475	18–15

January : 7–8 (home: 4–3; road: 3–5)

Game	Date	Team	Score	High points	High rebounds	High assists	Location Attendance	Record
34	January 2	@ Indiana	L 82–94	Kentavious Caldwell-Pope (16)	Andre Drummond (18)	Reggie Jackson (5)	Bankers Life Fieldhouse; 18,165	18–16
35	January 4	Orlando	W 115–89	Kentavious Caldwell-Pope (21)	Andre Drummond (12)	Reggie Jackson (7)	Palace of Auburn Hills; 14,301	19–16
36	January 6	@ Boston	W 99–94	Reggie Jackson (24)	Stanley Johnson (10)	Reggie Jackson (6)	TD Garden; 18,624	20–16
37	January 9	Brooklyn	W 103–89	Drummond & Jackson (23)	Ersan İlyasova (13)	Reggie Jackson (8)	Palace of Auburn Hills; 16,406	21–16
38	January 12	San Antonio	L 99–109	Kentavious Caldwell-Pope (25)	Andre Drummond (10)	Reggie Jackson (11)	Palace of Auburn Hills; 14,273	21–17
39	January 14	@ Memphis	L 101–103	Stanley Johnson (19)	Andre Drummond (11)	Reggie Jackson (6)	FedExForum; 15,977	21–18
40	January 16	Golden State	W 113–95	Caldwell-Pope & Jackson (20)	Andre Drummond (21)	Reggie Jackson (8)	Palace of Auburn Hills; 21,584	22–18
41	January 18	Chicago	L 101–111	İlyasova & Jackson (19)	Andre Drummond (16)	Reggie Jackson (6)	Palace of Auburn Hills; 18,935	22–19
42	January 20	@ Houston	W 123–114	Caldwell-Pope & Morris (22)	Andre Drummond (11)	Reggie Jackson (9)	Toyota Center; 17,203	23–19
43	January 21	@ New Orleans	L 99–115	Kentavious Caldwell-Pope (23)	Andre Drummond (22)	Jackson & Jennings (5)	Smoothie King Center; 15,281	23–20
44	January 23	@ Denver	L 101–104	Marcus Morris (20)	Baynes & Jennings (10)	Reggie Jackson (8)	Pepsi Center; 14,646	23–21
45	January 25	@ Utah	W 95–92	Reggie Jackson (29)	Ersan İlyasova (8)	Morris, Jackson & Jennings (4)	Vivint Smart Home Arena; 18,783	24–21
46	January 27	Philadelphia	W 110–97	Reggie Jackson (27)	Andre Drummond (18)	5 tied (3)	Palace of Auburn Hills; 13,712	25–21
47	January 29	Cleveland	L 106–114	Andre Drummond (20)	Andre Drummond (8)	Reggie Jackson (6)	Palace of Auburn Hills; 21,012	25–22
48	January 30	@ Toronto	L 107–111	Brandon Jennings (22)	Andre Drummond (12)	Morris & Baynes (2)	Air Canada Centre; 19,800	25–23

February : 6–6 (home: 3–3; road: 3–3)

Game	Date	Team	Score	High points	High rebounds	High assists	Location Attendance	Record
49	February 1	@ Brooklyn	W 105–100	Andre Drummond (21)	Andre Drummond (18)	Reggie Jackson (6)	Barclays Center; 13,290	26–23
50	February 3	@ Boston	L 95–102	Reggie Jackson (17)	Andre Drummond (13)	Reggie Jackson (7)	TD Garden; 17,297	26–24
51	February 4	New York	W 111–105	Stanley Johnson (22)	Andre Drummond (13)	Johnson & Jackson (5)	Palace of Auburn Hills; 17,095	27–24
52	February 6	@ Indiana	L 104–112	Reggie Jackson (26)	Andre Drummond (13)	Marcus Morris (4)	Bankers Life Fieldhouse; 18,165	27–25
53	February 8	Toronto	L 89–103	Ersan İlyasova (17)	Andre Drummond (13)	Marcus Morris (6)	Palace of Auburn Hills; 14,103	27–26
54	February 10	Denver	L 92–103	Marcus Morris (19)	Andre Drummond (16)	Morris & Hilliard (6)	Palace of Auburn Hills; 19,971	27–27
All-Star Break
55	February 19	@ Washington	L 86–98	Tobias Harris (21)	Andre Drummond (13)	Reggie Jackson (5)	Verizon Center; 20,356	27–28
56	February 21	New Orleans	L 106–111	Reggie Jackson (34)	Andre Drummond (14)	Steve Blake (5)	Palace of Auburn Hills; 17,886	27–29
57	February 22	@ Cleveland	W 96–88	Reggie Jackson (23)	Andre Drummond (15)	Jackson & Morris (4)	Quicken Loans Arena; 20,562	28–29
58	February 24	Philadelphia	W 111–91	Tobias Harris (22)	Andre Drummond (18)	Marcus Morris (8)	Palace of Auburn Hills; 13,429	29–29
59	February 27	@ Milwaukee	W 102–91	Reggie Jackson (22)	Andre Drummond (17)	Reggie Jackson (8)	BMO Harris Bradley Center; 17,165	30–29
60	February 28	Toronto	W 114–101	Reggie Jackson (19)	Andre Drummond (18)	Reggie Jackson (8)	Palace of Auburn Hills; 17,201	31–29

March : 9–6 (home: 7–2; road: 2–4)

Game	Date	Team	Score	High points	High rebounds	High assists	Location Attendance	Record
61	March 2	@ San Antonio	L 81–97	Morris & Harris (16)	Andre Drummond (14)	Harris & Blake (4)	AT&T Center; 18,581	31–30
62	March 5	@ New York	L 89–102	Andre Drummond (21)	Andre Drummond (16)	Reggie Jackson (6)	Madison Square Garden; 19,812	31–31
63	March 6	Portland	W 123–103	Reggie Jackson (30)	Andre Drummond (18)	Reggie Jackson (9)	Palace of Auburn Hills; 18,386	32–31
64	March 9	@ Dallas	W 102–96	Andre Drummond (25)	Andre Drummond (17)	Tobias Harris (5)	American Airlines Center; 20,249	33–31
65	March 11	@ Charlotte	L 103–118	Kentavious Caldwell-Pope (24)	Andre Drummond (9)	Reggie Jackson (10)	Time Warner Cable Arena; 18,189	33–32
66	March 12	@ Philadelphia	W 125–111	Reggie Jackson (24)	Andre Drummond (15)	Reggie Jackson (10)	Wells Fargo Center; 16,087	34–32
67	March 14	@ Washington	L 81–124	Kentavious Caldwell-Pope (18)	Andre Drummond (12)	Stanley Johnson (4)	Verizon Center; 18,042	34–33
68	March 16	Atlanta	L 114–118	Kentavious Caldwell-Pope (24)	Andre Drummond (18)	Reggie Jackson (10)	Palace of Auburn Hills; 14,121	34–34
69	March 18	Sacramento	W 115–108	Marcus Morris (24)	Andre Drummond (11)	Reggie Jackson (9)	Palace of Auburn Hills; 15,982	35–34
70	March 19	Brooklyn	W 115–103	Aron Baynes (21)	Andre Drummond (9)	Kentavious Caldwell-Pope (8)	Palace of Auburn Hills; 17,559	36–34
71	March 21	Milwaukee	W 92–91	Marcus Morris (21)	Andre Drummond (16)	Reggie Jackson (5)	Palace of Auburn Hills; 13,577	37–34
72	March 23	Orlando	W 118–102	Andre Drummond (30)	Andre Drummond (14)	Reggie Jackson (9)	Palace of Auburn Hills; 16,609	38–34
73	March 25	Charlotte	W 112–105	Kentavious Caldwell-Pope (21)	Andre Drummond (14)	Reggie Jackson (7)	Palace of Auburn Hills; 17,209	39–34
74	March 26	Atlanta	L 95–112	Tobias Harris (21)	Andre Drummond (17)	Steve Blake (6)	Palace of Auburn Hills; 17,857	39–35
75	March 29	Oklahoma City	W 88–82	Marcus Morris (24)	Andre Drummond (15)	Caldwell-Pope & Jackson (6)	Palace of Auburn Hills; 18,201	40–35

April : 4–3 (home: 1–2; road: 3–1)

Game	Date	Team	Score	High points	High rebounds	High assists	Location Attendance	Record
76	April 1	Dallas	L 89–98	Marcus Morris (31)	Andre Drummond (17)	Reggie Jackson (10)	Palace of Auburn Hills; 19,031	40–36
77	April 2	@ Chicago	W 94–90	Reggie Jackson (22)	Andre Drummond (11)	Harris, Drummond & Jackson (4)	United Center; 22,197	41–36
78	April 5	@ Miami	L 89–107	Harris & Jackson (21)	Andre Drummond (13)	Jackson & Blake (3)	American Airlines Arena; 19,621	41–37
79	April 6	@ Orlando	W 108–104	Reggie Jackson (24)	Andre Drummond (16)	Jackson & Blake (6)	Amway Center; 16,553	42–37
80	April 8	Washington	W 112–99	Reggie Jackson (39)	Tobias Harris (9)	Reggie Jackson (9)	Palace of Auburn Hills; 18,207	43–37
81	April 12	Miami	L 93–99	Kentavious Caldwell-Pope (17)	Andre Drummond (18)	Steve Blake (7)	Palace of Auburn Hills; 18,575	43–38
82	April 13	@ Cleveland	W 112–110 (OT)	Jodie Meeks (20)	Tolliver, Johnson & Bullock (8)	Steve Blake (6)	Quicken Loans Arena; 20,562	44–38

2015–16 season schedule

== Playoffs ==
=== Game log ===
2016 playoff game log
Total: 0–4 (home: 0–2; road: 0–2)
First Round: 0–4 (home: 0–2; road: 0–2)

Game	Date	Team	Score	High points	High rebounds	High assists	Location Attendance	Series
1	April 17	@ Cleveland	L 101–106	Kentavious Caldwell-Pope (21)	Andre Drummond (11)	Reggie Jackson (7)	Quicken Loans Arena; 20,562	0–1
2	April 20	@ Cleveland	L 90–107	Andre Drummond (20)	Harris & Caldwell-Pope (8)	Reggie Jackson (6)	Quicken Loans Arena; 20,562	0–2
3	April 22	Cleveland	L 91–101	Kentavious Caldwell-Pope (18)	Harris & Drummond (7)	Reggie Jackson (12)	The Palace of Auburn Hills; 21,584	0–3
4	April 24	Cleveland	L 98–100	Marcus Morris (24)	Tobias Harris (13)	Reggie Jackson (12)	The Palace of Auburn Hills; 21,584	0–4

2016 playoff schedule

== Player statistics ==
Legend
GP	Games played	GS	Games started	MPG	Minutes per game
FG%	Field-goal percentage	3P%	3-point field-goal percentage	FT%	Free-throw percentage
RPG	Rebounds per game	APG	Assists per game	SPG	Steals per game
BPG	Blocks per game	PPG	Points per game

=== Regular season ===
Player	GP	GS	MPG	FG%	3P%	FT%	RPG	APG	SPG	BPG	PPG
Andre Drummond	81	81	32.9	.521	.333	.355	14.8	.8	1.5	1.4	16.2
Aron Baynes	81	1	15.2	.505	.000	.764	4.7	.6	.3	.6	6.3
Marcus Morris Sr.	80	80	35.7	.434	.362	.749	5.1	2.5	.8	.3	14.1
Reggie Jackson	79	79	30.7	.434	.353	.864	3.2	6.2	.7	.1	18.8
Kentavious Caldwell-Pope	76	76	36.7	.420	.309	.811	3.7	1.8	1.4	.2	14.5
Stanley Johnson	73	6	23.1	.375	.307	.784	4.2	1.6	.8	.2	8.1
Anthony Tolliver	72	5	18.6	.386	.360	.617	3.2	.7	.4	.2	5.3
Steve Blake	58	2	17.0	.388	.344	.800	1.5	3.4	.4	.1	4.4
Ersan İlyasova^{†}	52	52	27.6	.425	.363	.725	5.4	1.1	.7	.5	11.3
Darrun Hilliard	38	2	10.1	.397	.380	.725	1.2	.7	.2	.0	4.0
Reggie Bullock	37	0	11.6	.439	.415	.933	1.8	.7	.3	.1	3.3
Tobias Harris^{†}	27	25	33.4	.477	.375	.911	6.2	2.6	.7	.4	16.6
Brandon Jennings^{†}	23	1	18.1	.371	.312	.711	2.0	3.0	.5	.1	6.8
Joel Anthony	19	0	5.1	.600		.750	1.1	.1	.1	.6	.9
Spencer Dinwiddie	12	0	13.3	.352	.100	.576	1.4	1.8	.3	.0	4.8
Justin Harper	5	0	7.0	.400	.444	.500	.2	.0	.2	.0	2.6
Jodie Meeks	3	0	14.3	.350	.444	1.000	1.7	1.0	.0	.0	7.3

=== Playoffs ===
Player	GP	GS	MPG	FG%	3P%	FT%	RPG	APG	SPG	BPG	PPG
Kentavious Caldwell-Pope	4	4	40.3	.440	.444	.714	4.3	2.8	1.8	.3	15.3
Tobias Harris	4	4	39.0	.457	.333	.923	9.5	3.0	.8	.8	14.5
Reggie Jackson	4	4	36.8	.455	.167	1.000	3.3	9.3	1.5	.5	14.3
Marcus Morris Sr.	4	4	36.0	.468	.389	.870	3.3	2.5	.5	.0	17.8
Andre Drummond	4	4	32.8	.519	.000	.324	9.0	.0	.3	1.5	16.8
Stanley Johnson	4	0	20.3	.522	.600	1.000	4.0	.0	.3	.0	8.0
Aron Baynes	4	0	11.0	.444		.667	2.0	.5	.0	.0	2.5
Steve Blake	4	0	10.8	.200	.500	.500	1.0	2.5	.0	.0	1.0
Anthony Tolliver	3	0	8.7	.500	.000		1.3	.3	.0	.3	1.3
Reggie Bullock	2	0	11.0	.833	.667		1.0	1.5	.5	.0	6.0
Spencer Dinwiddie	1	0	2.0	1.000			.0	1.0	.0	.0	2.0
Jodie Meeks	1	0	2.0	1.000			.0	.0	.0	.0	2.0

- ^{†} Denotes player spent time with another team in the season. Stats reflect time with the Pistons only.

== Transactions ==
=== Overview ===
Players Added

Via draft

- Stanley Johnson
- Darrun Hilliard

Via trade

- Ersan İlyasova
- Reggie Bullock
- Danny Granger
- Marcus Morris
- Steve Blake
- Tobias Harris

Via free agency

- Aron Baynes
- Adonis Thomas
Players Lost

Via trade

- Caron Butler
- Shawne Williams
- Quincy Miller
- Ersan İlyasova
- Brandon Jennings

Via free agency

- Greg Monroe

=== Trades ===
June 11, 2015	To Detroit Pistons Ersan İlyasova	To Milwaukee Bucks Caron Butler; Shawne Williams

July 2, 2015	To Detroit Pistons Reggie Bullock; Danny Granger; Marcus Morris	To Phoenix Suns 2020 2nd Round Pick

July 13, 2015	To Detroit Pistons Steve Blake	To Brooklyn Nets Quincy Miller

February 16, 2016	To Detroit Pistons Tobias Harris	To Orlando Magic Ersan İlyasova; Brandon Jennings

=== Free agency ===
==== Re-signed ====
Date	Player	Contract terms	Former team	Ref.
July 20	Joel Anthony	Signed 2-year contract worth $5 million	Detroit Pistons	
July 20	Reggie Jackson	Signed 5-year contract worth $80 million	Detroit Pistons	

==== Additions ====
Date	Player	Contract terms	Former team	Ref.
July 12	Aron Baynes	Signed 3-year contract worth $19.5 million	San Antonio Spurs	
July 23	Adonis Thomas	Signed 2-year contract worth $1.8 million	Grand Rapids Drive	

==== Subtractions ====
Date	Player	Reason left	New team	Ref.
July 9	Greg Monroe	Signed 3-year contract worth $50 million	Milwaukee Bucks	
October 26	Danny Granger	Waived	n/a	

== Awards ==
Player	Award	Date awarded	Ref.
Andre Drummond	Eastern Conference Player of the Week	November 1, 2015	
Andre Drummond	Eastern Conference Player of the Week	November 8, 2015	
Reggie Jackson	Eastern Conference Player of the Week	December 6, 2015	
Reggie Jackson	Eastern Conference Player of the Week	December 20, 2015	
