= 2016 NBA playoffs =

NBA postseason tournament

Tournament details
- Dates: April 16–June 19, 2016
- Season: 2015–16
- Teams: 16

Final positions
- Champions: Cleveland Cavaliers (1st title)
- Runners-up: Golden State Warriors
- Semifinalists: Toronto Raptors; Oklahoma City Thunder

Tournament statistics
- Scoring leader(s): Klay Thompson (Warriors) (24.3 PPG)

Awards
- MVP: LeBron James (Cavaliers)

The 2016 NBA playoffs was the postseason tournament of the National Basketball Association's 2015–16 season. The season began on April 16 and ended on June 19 with the Eastern Conference champion Cleveland Cavaliers defeating the defending champion and Western Conference champion Golden State Warriors in the NBA Finals. It was their first championship in franchise history, and it notably ended the Cleveland sports curse after 52 years. The Cavaliers became the first team to overcome a 3–1 series deficit in the NBA Finals, and the eleventh team overall to do so in the playoffs. They also became the fourth team to win their first ten playoff games.

== Overview ==
=== Western Conference ===
- The Golden State Warriors entered the playoffs with the best regular-season record in NBA history. The Warriors won 73 games, breaking the previous record of 72 wins set by the Chicago Bulls in the 1995–96 season. Golden State appeared in their fourth consecutive postseason for the first time since making six straight appearances from 1947 to 1952. However, they lost to the Cleveland Cavaliers in the NBA Finals.
- The Oklahoma City Thunder returned to the postseason after a one-season absence.
- The San Antonio Spurs finished just six games behind the Warriors for the best record in the NBA, entering their 19th consecutive postseason, having just one home loss in the regular season, setting a new single-season franchise record for wins. The Spurs' 40–1 home record equaled the feat set by the 1985–86 Boston Celtics. However, they lost in the Conference Semifinals to the Oklahoma City Thunder.

=== Eastern Conference ===
- The Cleveland Cavaliers earned the top seed in the Eastern Conference for the first time since 2010, the final season of LeBron James' first stint with the Cavaliers.
- The Toronto Raptors also finished with a franchise record for single-season victories, winning 56 games. They finished one game shy of the Cleveland Cavaliers for the best record in the Eastern Conference. However, they lost to the Cleveland Cavaliers in the Conference Finals.
- The Detroit Pistons qualified for the playoffs for the first time since 2009.
- The Miami Heat, Charlotte Hornets, and Indiana Pacers returned to the playoffs after a one-season absence.
- For the first time since 1999, all teams from the Eastern Conference finished with a better record against at least one team from the Western Conference. In addition, all Eastern Conference teams finished with records over .500 for the first time since 2012.

=== First Round ===
- Game 4 between the Cavaliers and the Pistons was the last playoff game played at the Palace of Auburn Hills, as well as the last major league postseason game played in Oakland County. The Pistons missed the playoffs the next year and moved to their new arena for the 2017–18 season.
- Game 7 between the Raptors and Pacers and the Heat and Hornets ensured a 17th straight postseason in which at least one Game 7 was played; 1999 was the last postseason to not feature a Game 7.
- With their Game 7 win over the Pacers, the Raptors won their first playoff series since 2001.

=== Conference Semifinals ===
- With their Conference Semifinals victory over the Atlanta Hawks, the Cleveland Cavaliers became the fifth team (since the first round was extended to a best–of–seven series in 2003) to go 8–0 through the first two rounds and the first to do it twice; they first did so in 2009. This also marked the sixth consecutive year that LeBron James played in the Eastern Conference finals. James played in the Conference finals with the Miami Heat from 2011 to 2014, and with the Cavaliers in 2015.
- With their Game 6 victory over the San Antonio Spurs, the Oklahoma City Thunder made the Western Conference Finals for the third time in five seasons.
- Game 7 of the Eastern Conference semifinals between the Toronto Raptors and Miami Heat marked the first time since 2001 that two teams that played a Game 7 in the previous round of the playoffs faced off against each other in another Game 7 in the next round. This would later happen again 10 years later.
- With their Game 7 win over the Miami Heat, the Toronto Raptors advanced to the Eastern Conference finals for the first time in their history. This meant they also became the first Canadian–based and non–U.S. team to do so.

=== Conference Finals ===
- For the first time since 2010, no Texas team was represented in the Western Conference finals.
- Game 3 of the Eastern Conference finals between the Toronto Raptors and the Cleveland Cavaliers was Toronto's first ever Eastern Conference finals win.
- Game 4 of the Western Conference finals marked the first time that the Golden State Warriors had lost consecutive games during the season.
- With their Eastern Conference Finals victory over the Toronto Raptors, the Cleveland Cavaliers became the first team in NBA history to go 8–0 in the first two rounds, and qualify to play in the NBA Finals. This also marked the sixth consecutive NBA Finals appearance for LeBron James. He became the first player since the 1960s to accomplish this feat.
- The Western Conference finals went to a Game 7 for the first time since 2002, when the Los Angeles Lakers defeated the Sacramento Kings in overtime.
- With their 96–88 victory over the Oklahoma City Thunder in Game 7 of the Western Conference finals, the Golden State Warriors became the tenth team in NBA History to come back from a 3–1 series deficit in the playoffs. As a result, this marked the second consecutive season an NBA team rallied from a 3–1 series deficit to win the series. The Warriors also became the first team to accomplish this feat in the Conference finals since the 1981 Boston Celtics.

=== NBA Finals ===
- With their 104–89 and 110–77 wins over Cleveland in Game 1 and 2 of the NBA Finals, the Warriors posted the highest winning margin in the first two games in the NBA Finals with an +48 point differential.
- Thanks to the Cleveland Cavaliers’ 120–90 Game 3 victory, the Golden State Warriors lost every Game 3 of their 2016 playoff run.
- Draymond Green became the first NBA player to be suspended for an NBA Finals game since Jerry Stackhouse in 2006. He was suspended for Game 5, due to incurring excessive flagrant foul points in Game 4 (in which the Warriors won 108–97).
- In Game 5, LeBron James and Kyrie Irving became the first pair to each record 40+ points in a single NBA Finals game in history, helping the Cavaliers win 112–97.
- In Game 6, Stephen Curry, the unanimous MVP of the regular season, was ejected for throwing a mouthpiece in the fourth quarter. His Golden State Warriors would go on to lose 101–115.
- The NBA Finals went to a Game 7 for the first time since 2013, when the Miami Heat defeated the San Antonio Spurs 95–88.
- Game 7 of the NBA Finals marked the first time that the Golden State Warriors had lost three consecutive games during the season, and the first time that they had lost consecutive home games during the season.

=== Game 7 of the 2016 NBA Finals ===
- Game 7 of the NBA Finals was extremely notable for The Block (basketball), in which LeBron James blocked a layup by Andre Iguodala to keep the score tied at 89. This block, along with Kyrie Irving's title winning three pointer would seal the win for the Cleveland Cavaliers.
- With the win, the Cleveland Cavaliers became the first team to win Game 7 of the NBA Finals on the road since the 1978 Washington Bullets accomplished the feat against the Seattle SuperSonics. They also became the first team overall to win a Game 7 on the road since the 2014 Brooklyn Nets (which was also decided on a game-winning block).
- With the loss, the Golden State Warriors became the first team to overcome a 3–1 series deficit and blow a 3–1 series lead in the same playoffs (copying what the 2003 Vancouver Canucks did in the NHL). They also became the first team in NBA history to win 70+ regular season games and fail to win the NBA championship.
- The Cavaliers became the 11th team to overcome a 3–1 series deficit and the first to do so in the NBA Finals. It is also the first time in playoff history two NBA teams rallied from a 3–1 deficit in the same year. They also clinched Cleveland's first major sports title since 1964, effectively ending the Cleveland sports curse.
- The Cleveland Cavaliers became the first team since the 2006 Miami Heat to win an NBA Championship despite a midseason coaching change and despite trailing 2–0 (they became the fourth team overall to win the NBA Finals despite losing the first two games (after the 1969 Boston Celtics, 1977 Portland Trail Blazers, and the aforementioned 2006 Miami Heat).
- The title the Cleveland Cavaliers won was clinched on Father's Day for the fourth time in NBA history (the previous occurrences were in 1996, 2003, and 2014). It also marked the first time since 2014 that when both teams made back-to-back Finals appearances, the team that lost in the Finals the year before won the title the next year. This would happen again the following year.
  - The Cleveland Cavaliers became the third team to clinch an NBA title on Father's Day. The other two teams were the Chicago Bulls (1996) and the San Antonio Spurs (twice).

== Format ==
Within each conference, the eight teams with the most wins qualify for the playoffs. The seedings are based on each team's record.

Each conference's bracket is fixed; there is no reseeding. All rounds are best-of-seven series; the team that has four wins advances to the next round. As stated above, all rounds, including the NBA Finals, are in a 2–2–1–1–1 format. The rule for determining home court advantage in the NBA Finals is winning percentage, then head-to-head record, followed by record vs. opposite conference.

=== Seeding ===
On September 8, 2015, the NBA announced changes to how playoff teams were seeded. Previously, the division champions were guaranteed no worse than the fourth seed, while the team with the second-best record in the conference was guaranteed no worse than the second seed even if it wasn't a division champion. Starting with the 2016 playoffs, the eight playoff qualifiers in each conference were seeded solely based on regular-season record. If two teams finish with identical records, the team that wins the regular-season series would get the higher seed. If the regular-season series is tied and one of the teams is a division champion, the division champion would get the higher seed. If three or more teams finish with identical records and one of the teams is a division champion, the division champion would get the higher seed.

== Playoff qualifying ==
On February 27, 2016, the Golden State Warriors became the first team to clinch a playoff spot. This was the earliest a team had clinched a playoff spot in February since the 1987–88 Los Angeles Lakers. The Cleveland Cavaliers became the first Eastern Conference team to clinch a playoff spot on March 18, 2016.

=== Eastern Conference ===
Seed	Team	Record	Clinched			
Seed	Team	Record	Playoff berth	Division title	Best record in Conference	Best record in NBA
1	Cleveland Cavaliers	57–25	March 18	March 21	April 11	—
2	Toronto Raptors	56–26	March 23	March 31	—	—
3	Miami Heat (Note: Miami won the Southeast Division over Atlanta and Charlotte, and therefore clinched the #3 seed, by having the best record of the three teams in games against each other (5–3 record vs. Atlanta & Charlotte). Atlanta, Boston, and Charlotte were seeded based on record in games against each other (Atlanta: 6–2, Boston: 3–4, Charlotte: 2–5).)	48–34	April 2	April 13	—	—
4	Atlanta Hawks	48–34	March 29	—	—	—
5	Boston Celtics	48–34	April 3	—	—	—
6	Charlotte Hornets	48–34	April 2	—	—	—
7	Indiana Pacers	45–37	April 10	—	—	—
8	Detroit Pistons	44–38	April 8	—	—	—

=== Western Conference ===
Seed	Team	Record	Clinched			
Seed	Team	Record	Playoff berth	Division title	Best record in Conference	Best record in NBA
1	Golden State Warriors	73–9	February 27	March 13	April 7	April 7
2	San Antonio Spurs	67–15	March 2	March 12	—	—
3	Oklahoma City Thunder	55–27	March 18	March 20	—	—
4	Los Angeles Clippers	53–29	March 27	—	—	—
5	Portland Trail Blazers	44–38	April 6	—	—	—
6	Dallas Mavericks (Note: Dallas clinched #6 seed over Memphis based on 3–1 record in head-to-head games in regular season.)	42–40	April 11	—	—	—
7	Memphis Grizzlies	42–40	April 7	—	—	—
8	Houston Rockets	41–41	April 13	—	—	—

== Bracket ==
Teams in bold advanced to the next round. The numbers to the left of each team indicate the team's seeding in its conference, and the numbers to the right indicate the number of games the team won in that round. The division champions are marked by an asterisk. Teams with home court advantage are shown in Italics.

First Round	Conference Semifinals
**E1**	**Cleveland***	**4**
E8	Detroit	0
**E1**	**Cleveland***	**4**
E4	Atlanta	0
**E4**	**Atlanta**	**4**
E5	Boston	2
**Eastern Conference**
**E3**	**Miami***	**4**
E6	Charlotte	3
E3	Miami*	3
**E2**	**Toronto***	**4**
**E2**	**Toronto***	**4**
E7	Indiana	3
**W1**	**Golden State***	**4**
W8	Houston	1
**W1**	**Golden State***	**4**
W5	Portland	1
W4	LA Clippers	2
**W5**	**Portland**	**4**
**Western Conference**
**W3**	**Oklahoma City***	**4**
W6	Dallas	1
**W3**	**Oklahoma City***	**4**
W2	San Antonio*	2
**W2**	**San Antonio***	**4**
W7	Memphis	0

Conference Finals
**E1**	**Cleveland***	**4**
E2	Toronto*	2
**W1**	**Golden State***	**4**
W3	Oklahoma City*	3

NBA Finals
**E1**	**Cleveland***	**4**
W1	Golden State*	3

- * Division winner
- **Bold** Series winner
- Italics Team with home-court advantage

== First round ==
All times are in Eastern Daylight Time (UTC−04:00)

=== Eastern Conference first round ===
==== (1) Cleveland Cavaliers vs. (8) Detroit Pistons ====
ABC

April 17
3:00 PM

Boxscore

Detroit Pistons 101, Cleveland Cavaliers 106
Scoring by quarter: 25–27, 33–26, 20–23, 23–30
Pts: Kentavious Caldwell-Pope 21; Rebs: Andre Drummond 11; Asts: Reggie Jackson 7	Pts: Kyrie Irving 31; Rebs: Kevin Love 13; Asts: LeBron James 11
Cleveland leads series, 1–0

Quicken Loans Arena, Cleveland, Ohio
Attendance: 20,562
Referees: Derrick Stafford, Leroy Richardson, Zach Zarba

TNT

April 20
8:00 PM

Boxscore

Detroit Pistons 90, Cleveland Cavaliers 107
Scoring by quarter: 28–23, 25–32, 15–27, 22–25
Pts: Andre Drummond 20; Rebs: Caldwell-Pope, Harris 8 each Asts: Reggie Jackson 6	Pts: LeBron James 27; Rebs: Kevin Love 10; Asts: Matthew Dellavedova 9
Cleveland leads series, 2–0

Quicken Loans Arena, Cleveland, Ohio
Attendance: 20,562
Referees: Ken Mauer, Kane Fitzgerald, Brian Forte

ESPN

April 22
7:00 PM

Boxscore

Cleveland Cavaliers 101, Detroit Pistons 91
Scoring by quarter: 24–27, 30–26, 25–20, 22–18
Pts: Kyrie Irving 26; Rebs: LeBron James 13; Asts: LeBron James 7	Pts: Kentavious Caldwell-Pope 18; Rebs: Drummond, Harris 7 each Asts: Reggie Jackson 12
Cleveland leads series, 3–0

The Palace of Auburn Hills, Auburn Hills, Michigan
Attendance: 21,584
Referees: Monty McCutchen, Jason Phillips, Michael Smih

TNT

April 24
8:30 PM

Boxscore

Cleveland Cavaliers 100, Detroit Pistons 98
Scoring by quarter: 25–28, 28–24, 28–26, 19–20
Pts: Kyrie Irving 31; Rebs: Kevin Love 13; Asts: LeBron James 6	Pts: Marcus Morris 24; Rebs: Tobias Harris 13; Asts: Reggie Jackson 12
Cleveland wins series, 4–0

The Palace of Auburn Hills, Auburn Hills, Michigan
Attendance: 21,584
Referees: Marc Davis, Bill Kennedy, Courtney Kirkland

In Game 3, Kyrie Irving hit the tough corner 3 late in the 4th quarter, with only 0.7 seconds remaining on the shot clock. In Game 4, Irving also hit a three to give the Cavaliers a 4-point lead with less than a minute left. Reggie Jackson would then drive and dunk the ball to cut the lead to 2. As Irving attempted another clutch 3, it went short and the players scrambled for the ball until the Pistons came up with it. As they looked for a 3 to force Game 5, or a 2 to send it to overtime, they look to Reggie Jackson. He took a 3 over Irving, but that went short as well, and the Cavaliers move on to the second round. Game 4 was also the last playoff game ever played at The Palace of Auburn Hills.

Regular-season series
Detroit won 3–1 in the regular-season series

November 17, 2015

Recap

Cleveland Cavaliers 99, Detroit Pistons 104

The Palace of Auburn Hills, Auburn Hills, Michigan

January 29, 2016

Recap

Cleveland Cavaliers 114, Detroit Pistons 106

The Palace of Auburn Hills, Auburn Hills, Michigan

February 22, 2016

Recap

Detroit Pistons 96, Cleveland Cavaliers 88

Quicken Loans Arena, Cleveland, Ohio

April 13, 2016

Recap

Detroit Pistons 112, Cleveland Cavaliers 110 (OT)

Quicken Loans Arena, Cleveland, Ohio

This was the fourth playoff meeting between these two teams, with the Cavaliers winning two out of the first three meetings.

Previous playoffs series
Cleveland leads 2–1 in all-time playoff series

2006

Detroit Pistons 4, Cleveland Cavaliers 3

2006 Eastern Conference Semifinals

2007

Detroit Pistons 2, Cleveland Cavaliers 4

2007 Eastern Conference Finals

2009

Cleveland Cavaliers 4, Detroit Pistons 0

2009 Eastern Conference First Round

- This is the most recent playoff series between the Pistons & Cavaliers until 2026.

==== (2) Toronto Raptors vs. (7) Indiana Pacers ====
The Raptors won their first playoff series since the 2001 Eastern Conference first round.

ESPN, SN1

April 16
12:30 PM

Boxscore

Indiana Pacers 100, Toronto Raptors 90
Scoring by quarter: 19–24, 24–21, 27–22, 30–23
Pts: Paul George 39; Rebs: Lavoy Allen 12; Asts: Paul George 6	Pts: Cory Joseph 18; Rebs: Jonas Valančiūnas 19; Asts: Kyle Lowry 7
Indiana leads series, 1–0

Air Canada Centre, Toronto, Ontario
Attendance: 19,800
Referees: Scott Foster, Tony Brothers, Josh Tiven

NBA TV, TSN

April 18
7:00 PM

Boxscore

Indiana Pacers 87, Toronto Raptors 98
Scoring by quarter: 16–27, 32–26, 18–21, 21–24
Pts: Paul George 28; Rebs: Solomon Hill 6 Asts: Ellis, Lawson 3 each	Pts: Jonas Valančiūnas 23; Rebs: Jonas Valančiūnas 15; Asts: Kyle Lowry 9
Series tied, 1–1

Air Canada Centre, Toronto, Ontario
Attendance: 19,800
Referees: Monty McCutchen, Tony Brown, Jason Phillips

NBA TV, TSN

April 21
7:30 PM

Boxscore

Toronto Raptors 101, Indiana Pacers 85
Scoring by quarter: 24–17, 29–19, 18–23, 30–26
Pts: DeRozan, Lowry 21 each Rebs: Jonas Valančiūnas 14; Asts: Kyle Lowry 8	Pts: Paul George 25; Rebs: Paul George 10; Asts: Paul George 6
Toronto leads series, 2–1

Bankers Life Fieldhouse, Indianapolis
Attendance: 18,165
Referees: James Capers, Bennie Adams, Rodney Mott

TNT, SN1

April 23
3:00 PM

Boxscore

Toronto Raptors 83, Indiana Pacers 100
Scoring by quarter: 16–28, 26–29, 16–16, 25–27
Pts: Jonas Valančiūnas 16; Rebs: Bismack Biyombo 9 Asts: Kyle Lowry 5	Pts: Hill, Mahinmi 22 each Rebs: Ian Mahinmi 10; Asts: Ian Mahinmi 5
Series tied, 2–2

Bankers Life Fieldhouse, Indianapolis
Attendance: 18,165
Referees: Danny Crawford, Ron Garretson, Bill Spooner

TNT, SN1

April 26
6:00 PM

Boxscore

Indiana Pacers 99, Toronto Raptors 102
Scoring by quarter: 35–20, 26–32, 29–25, 9–25
Pts: Paul George 39; Rebs: George, Turner 8 each Asts: Paul George 8	Pts: DeMar DeRozan 34; Rebs: Bismack Biyombo 16; Asts: Kyle Lowry 5
Toronto leads series, 3–2

Air Canada Centre, Toronto, Ontario
Attendance: 19,800
Referees: Marc Davis, Bill Kennedy, Zach Zarba

NBA TV/ESPNews, TSN

April 29
7:30 PM

Boxscore

Toronto Raptors 83, Indiana Pacers 101
Scoring by quarter: 22–20, 22–20, 20–31, 19–30
Pts: Carroll, Joseph 15 each Rebs: Bismack Biyombo 10; Asts: Kyle Lowry 10	Pts: Paul George 21; Rebs: Paul George 11; Asts: Paul George 6
Series tied, 3–3

Bankers Life Fieldhouse, Indianapolis
Attendance: 18,165
Referees: Mike Callahan, Kane Fitzgerald, John Goble

TNT, SN1

May 1
8:00 PM

Boxscore

Indiana Pacers 84, Toronto Raptors 89
Scoring by quarter: 23–28, 21–22, 20–28, 20–11
Pts: Paul George 26; Rebs: Paul George 12; Asts: Monta Ellis 7	Pts: DeMar DeRozan 30; Rebs: Jonas Valančiūnas 15; Asts: Kyle Lowry 9
Toronto wins series, 4–3

Air Canada Centre, Toronto, Ontario
Attendance: 20,669
Referees: Danny Crawford, Ron Garretson, Bill Spooner

Regular-season series
Toronto won 3–1 in the regular-season series

October 28, 2015

Recap

Indiana Pacers 99, Toronto Raptors 106

Air Canada Centre, Toronto, Ontario

December 14, 2015

Recap

Toronto Raptors 90, Indiana Pacers 106

Bankers Life Fieldhouse, Indianapolis, Indiana

March 17, 2016

Recap

Toronto Raptors 101, Indiana Pacers 94 (OT)

Bankers Life Fieldhouse, Indianapolis, Indiana

April 8, 2016

Recap

Indiana Pacers 98, Toronto Raptors 111

Air Canada Centre, Toronto, Ontario

This was the first meeting in the playoffs between the Raptors and Pacers.

==== (3) Miami Heat vs. (6) Charlotte Hornets ====
TNT

April 17
5:30 PM

Boxscore

Charlotte Hornets 91, Miami Heat 123
Scoring by quarter: 22–41, 28–26, 24–30, 17–26
Pts: Nicolas Batum 24; Rebs: Cody Zeller 7 Asts: Jeremy Lin 3	Pts: Luol Deng 31; Rebs: Hassan Whiteside 11; Asts: Goran Dragić 10
Miami leads series, 1–0

American Airlines Arena, Miami
Attendance: 19,600
Referees: Ken Mauer, Sean Corbin, Ed Malloy

NBA TV

April 20
7:00 PM

Boxscore

Charlotte Hornets 103, Miami Heat 115
Scoring by quarter: 29–29, 31–43, 18–19, 25–24
Pts: Kemba Walker 29; Rebs: Nicolas Batum 7 Asts: Batum, Walker 3 each	Pts: Dwyane Wade 28; Rebs: Hassan Whiteside 13; Asts: Dwyane Wade 8
Miami leads series, 2–0

American Airlines Arena, Miami
Attendance: 19,650
Referees: Marc Davis, Courtney Kirkland, Bill Spooner

TNT

April 23
5:30 PM

Boxscore

Miami Heat 80, Charlotte Hornets 96
Scoring by quarter: 28–29, 16–20, 14–26, 22–21
Pts: Luol Deng 19; Rebs: Hassan Whiteside 18; Asts: Goran Dragić 4	Pts: Jeremy Lin 18; Rebs: Marvin Williams 14; Asts: Kemba Walker 7
Miami leads series, 2–1

Time Warner Cable Arena, Charlotte, North Carolina
Attendance: 19,604
Referees: Mike Callahan, James Williams, Sean Wright

NBA TV

April 25
7:00 PM

Boxscore

Miami Heat 85, Charlotte Hornets 89
Scoring by quarter: 26–19, 13–29, 22–21, 24–20
Pts: Joe Johnson 16; Rebs: four players 7 each Asts: Dwyane Wade 10	Pts: Kemba Walker 34; Rebs: Spencer Hawes 8 Asts: Jefferson, Lin 3 each
Series tied, 2–2

Time Warner Cable Arena, Charlotte, North Carolina
Attendance: 19,156
Referees: Danny Crawford, Derrick Collins, Ron Garretson

TNT

April 27
8:00 PM

Boxscore

Charlotte Hornets 90, Miami Heat 88
Scoring by quarter: 28–25, 21–22, 16–24, 25–17
Pts: Marvin Williams 17; Rebs: Marvin Williams 8 Asts: Jeremy Lin 7	Pts: Dwyane Wade 25; Rebs: Hassan Whiteside 12; Asts: Dwyane Wade 4
Charlotte leads series, 3–2

American Airlines Arena, Miami
Attendance: 19,685
Referees: Derrick Stafford, Kane Fitzgerald, Jason Phillips

ESPN

April 29
8:00 PM

Boxscore

Miami Heat 97, Charlotte Hornets 90
Scoring by quarter: 27–24, 32–26, 16–20, 22–20
Pts: Dwyane Wade 23; Rebs: three players 7 each Asts: Dwyane Wade 4	Pts: Kemba Walker 37; Rebs: Al Jefferson 9 Asts: Kemba Walker 5
Series tied, 3–3

Time Warner Cable Arena, Charlotte, North Carolina
Attendance: 19,636
Referees: Monty McCutchen, Bill Spooner, Tom Washington

ABC

May 1
1:00 PM

Boxscore

Charlotte Hornets 73, Miami Heat 106
Scoring by quarter: 18–29, 24–25, 11–29, 20–23
Pts: Frank Kaminsky 12; Rebs: Cody Zeller 7 Asts: Kemba Walker 6	Pts: Goran Dragić 25; Rebs: Hassan Whiteside 12; Asts: three players 4 each
Miami wins series, 4–3

AmericanAirlines Arena, Miami
Attendance: 19,868
Referees: Mike Callahan, Bill Kennedy, Ed Malloy

With the series tied at two games apiece, Game 5 was a close one. After Kemba Walker misses a stepback jumper over Hassan Whiteside, Courtney Lee gets the offensive rebound and hits a clutch 3 with 25.2 seconds left. The Hornets then block 2 shots to seal it. It was their first playoff road win since game 4 of the 2002 playoffs against the Orlando Magic. By then, Charlotte was on the verge of an upset, but in Game 6, Dwyane Wade wouldn't let his team down. Although he hasn't hit a three since December 2015, he hits 2 clutch shots including a three with less than a minute to go, as the series goes back to Miami for a Game 7. There, the Heat closed out the series and advance to the second round, to face the Toronto Raptors, who also moved on to the second round for the first time since 2001.

Regular-season series
Tied 2–2 in the regular-season series

October 28, 2015

Recap

Charlotte Hornets 94, Miami Heat 104

AmericanAirlines Arena, Miami

December 9, 2015

Recap

Miami Heat 81, Charlotte Hornets 99

Time Warner Cable Arena, Charlotte, North Carolina

February 5, 2016

Recap

Miami Heat 98, Charlotte Hornets 95

Time Warner Cable Arena, Charlotte, North Carolina

March 17, 2016

Recap

Charlotte Hornets 109, Miami Heat 106

AmericanAirlines Arena, Miami

This was the third playoff meeting between these two teams, with the Heat winning the most recent meeting in 2014.

Previous playoffs series
Tied 1–1 in all-time playoff series

2001

Miami Heat 0, Charlotte Hornets 3

2001 Eastern Conference First Round

2014

Miami Heat 4, Charlotte Bobcats 0

2014 Eastern Conference First Round

==== (4) Atlanta Hawks vs. (5) Boston Celtics ====
ESPN

April 16
7:00 PM

Boxscore

Boston Celtics 101, Atlanta Hawks 102
Scoring by quarter: 19–30, 15–21, 31–21, 36–30
Pts: Isaiah Thomas 27; Rebs: Jae Crowder 10; Asts: Isaiah Thomas 8	Pts: Al Horford 24; Rebs: Al Horford 12; Asts: Jeff Teague 12
Atlanta leads series, 1–0

Philips Arena, Atlanta
Attendance: 18,980
Referees: James Capers, Derrick Collins, Rodney Mott

TNT

April 19
7:00 PM

Boxscore

Boston Celtics 72, Atlanta Hawks 89
Scoring by quarter: 7–24, 21–19, 18–18, 26–28
Pts: Isaiah Thomas 16; Rebs: Amir Johnson 8 Asts: three players 3 each	Pts: Horford, Korver 17 each Rebs: Kent Bazemore 9 Asts: Jeff Teague 6
Atlanta leads series, 2–0

Philips Arena, Atlanta
Attendance: 18,972
Referees: Scott Foster, Tony Brothers, Josh Tiven

ESPN2

April 22
8:00 PM

Boxscore

Atlanta Hawks 103, Boston Celtics 111
Scoring by quarter: 20–37, 25–20, 33–22, 25–32
Pts: Jeff Teague 23; Rebs: Al Horford 13; Asts: Al Horford 6	Pts: Isaiah Thomas 42; Rebs: Jonas Jerebko 12; Asts: Evan Turner 7
Atlanta leads series, 2–1

TD Garden, Boston
Attendance: 18,624
Referees: Marc Davis, Eric Lewis, Zach Zarba

TNT

April 24
6:00 PM

Boxscore

Atlanta Hawks 95, Boston Celtics 104 (OT)
Scoring by quarter: 21–24, 27–22, 25–24, 19–22, Overtime: 3–12
Pts: Paul Millsap 45; Rebs: Paul Millsap 13; Asts: Horford, Teague 5 each	Pts: Isaiah Thomas 28; Rebs: Jonas Jerebko 10; Asts: Thomas, Turner 6 each
Series tied, 2–2

TD Garden, Boston
Attendance: 18,624
Referees: Monty McCutchen, Bennie Adams, Jason Phillips

TNT

April 26
8:30 PM

Boxscore

Boston Celtics 83, Atlanta Hawks 110
Scoring by quarter: 20–15, 19–32, 23–42, 21–21
Pts: Evan Turner 15; Rebs: Jonas Jerebko 8 Asts: Terry Rozier 4	Pts: Mike Scott 17; Rebs: Horford, Millsap 8 each Asts: Millsap, Schröder 6 each
Atlanta leads series, 3–2

Philips Arena, Atlanta
Attendance: 18,987
Referees: Mike Callahan, Pat Fraher, John Goble

TNT

April 28
8:00 PM

Boxscore

Atlanta Hawks 104, Boston Celtics 92
Scoring by quarter: 20–17, 21–16, 39–26, 24–33
Pts: Paul Millsap 17; Rebs: Kyle Korver 9 Asts: Dennis Schröder 8	Pts: Isaiah Thomas 25; Rebs: Smart, Turner 7 each Asts: Isaiah Thomas 10
Atlanta wins series, 4–2

TD Garden, Boston
Attendance: 18,624
Referees: Scott Foster, Tony Brothers, James Williams

Regular-season series
Atlanta won 3–1 in the regular-season series

November 13, 2015

Recap

Atlanta Hawks 93, Boston Celtics 106

TD Garden, Boston

November 24, 2015

Recap

Boston Celtics 97, Atlanta Hawks 121

Philips Arena, Atlanta

December 18, 2015

Recap

Atlanta Hawks 109, Boston Celtics 101

TD Garden, Boston

April 9, 2016

Recap

Boston Celtics 107, Atlanta Hawks 118

Philips Arena, Atlanta

This was the 12th playoff meeting between these two teams, with the Celtics winning ten of the first eleven meetings.

Previous playoff series
Boston leads 10–1 in all-time playoff series

1957

Boston Celtics 4, St. Louis Hawks 3

1957 NBA Finals

1958

St. Louis Hawks 4, Boston Celtics 2

1958 NBA Finals

1960

Boston Celtics 4, St. Louis Hawks 3

1960 NBA Finals

1961

Boston Celtics 4, St. Louis Hawks 1

1961 NBA Finals

1972

Boston Celtics 4, Atlanta Hawks 2

1972 Eastern Conference First Round

1973

Boston Celtics 4, Atlanta Hawks 2

1973 Eastern Conference Semifinals

1983

Boston Celtics 2, Atlanta Hawks 1

1983 Eastern Conference First Round

1986

Boston Celtics 4, Atlanta Hawks 1

1986 Eastern Conference Semifinals

1988

Boston Celtics 4, Atlanta Hawks 3

1988 Eastern Conference Semifinals

2008

Boston Celtics 4, Atlanta Hawks 3

2008 Eastern Conference First Round

2012

Boston Celtics 4, Atlanta Hawks 2

2012 Eastern Conference First Round

- This is the most recent playoff series between the Celtics & Hawks until 2023.

=== Western Conference first round ===
==== (1) Golden State Warriors vs. (8) Houston Rockets ====
ABC

April 16
3:30 PM

Boxscore

Houston Rockets 78, Golden State Warriors 104
Scoring by quarter: 15–33, 18–27, 27–22, 18–22
Pts: James Harden 17; Rebs: Clint Capela 12; Asts: Corey Brewer 6	Pts: Stephen Curry 24; Rebs: Draymond Green 10; Asts: Andre Iguodala 7
Golden State leads series, 1–0

Oracle Arena, Oakland, California
Attendance: 19,596
Referees: Danny Crawford, Ron Garretson, Mark Lindsay

TNT

April 18
10:30 PM

Boxscore

Houston Rockets 106, Golden State Warriors 115
Scoring by quarter: 30–33, 28–33, 21–20, 27–29
Pts: James Harden 28; Rebs: Dwight Howard 10; Asts: James Harden 11	Pts: Klay Thompson 34; Rebs: Draymond Green 14; Asts: Draymond Green 8
Golden State leads series, 2–0

Oracle Arena, Oakland, California
Attendance: 19,596
Referees: James Capers, John Goble, Rodney Mott

TNT

April 21
9:30 PM

Boxscore

Golden State Warriors 96, Houston Rockets 97
Scoring by quarter: 18–31, 30–24, 24–23, 24–19
Pts: Marreese Speights 22; Rebs: Klay Thompson 8 Asts: Draymond Green 7	Pts: James Harden 35; Rebs: Howard, Motiejūnas 13 each Asts: James Harden 9
Golden State leads series, 2–1

Toyota Center, Houston, Texas
Attendance: 18,200
Referees: Scott Foster, Mark Ayotte, Tom Washington

ABC

April 24
3:30 PM

Boxscore

Golden State Warriors 121, Houston Rockets 94
Scoring by quarter: 29–29, 27–27, 41–20, 24–18
Pts: Klay Thompson 23; Rebs: Draymond Green 8 Asts: Shaun Livingston 9	Pts: Dwight Howard 19; Rebs: Dwight Howard 15; Asts: James Harden 10
Golden State leads series, 3–1

Toyota Center, Houston, Texas
Attendance: 18,200
Referees: Derrick Stafford, Kane Fitzgerald, Zach Zarba

TNT

April 27
10:30 PM

Boxscore

Houston Rockets 81, Golden State Warriors 114
Scoring by quarter: 20–37, 17–22, 22–30, 22–25
Pts: James Harden 35; Rebs: Dwight Howard 21; Asts: James Harden 6	Pts: Klay Thompson 27; Rebs: Draymond Green 9 Asts: Draymond Green 8
Golden State wins series, 4–1

Oracle Arena, Oakland, California
Attendance: 19,596
Referees: Ken Mauer, Ed Malloy, Brian Forte

The Warriors, after game 1, went through games 2 and 3 without Stephen Curry. He injured his ankle and would be lost until game 4. Game 4 saw him injure his knee, as he slipped on a wet spot on the floor at the Toyota Center in Houston. Curry's Warriors teammates stepped up and blew out the Rockets by 27 points. They would close out the series by blowing the Rockets out again, by 33 points.

Regular-season series
Golden State won 3–0 in the regular-season series

October 30, 2015

Recap

Golden State Warriors 112, Houston Rockets 92

Toyota Center, Houston, Texas

December 31, 2015

Recap

Golden State Warriors 114, Houston Rockets 110

Toyota Center, Houston, Texas

February 9, 2016

Recap

Houston Rockets 110, Golden State Warriors 123

Oracle Arena, Oakland, California

This was the second playoff meeting between these two teams, with the first meeting being in 2015, as Golden State defeated Houston 4–1 in the Western Conference finals.

Previous playoffs series
Golden State leads 1–0 in all-time playoff series

2015

Golden State Warriors 4, Houston Rockets 1

2015 Western Conference Finals

==== (2) San Antonio Spurs vs. (7) Memphis Grizzlies ====
TNT

April 17
8:00 PM

Boxscore

Memphis Grizzlies 74, San Antonio Spurs 106
Scoring by quarter: 13–22, 24–26, 14–33, 23–25
Pts: Vince Carter 16; Rebs: Chris Andersen 9 Asts: Xavier Munford 4	Pts: Kawhi Leonard 20; Rebs: Tim Duncan 11; Asts: Tony Parker 6
San Antonio leads series, 1–0

AT&T Center, San Antonio, Texas
Attendance: 18,418
Referees: Mike Callahan, Pat Fraher, Sean Wright

TNT

April 19
9:30 PM

Boxscore

Memphis Grizzlies 68, San Antonio Spurs 94
Scoring by quarter: 11–22, 24–27, 18–21, 15–24
Pts: Tony Allen 12; Rebs: Zach Randolph 12; Asts: Zach Randolph 3	Pts: Patty Mills 16; Rebs: Tim Duncan 9 Asts: Duncan, Parker 4 each
San Antonio leads series, 2–0

AT&T Center, San Antonio, Texas
Attendance: 18,418
Referees: Mike Callahan, Tom Washington, James Williams

ESPN

April 22
9:30 PM

Boxscore

San Antonio Spurs 96, Memphis Grizzlies 87
Scoring by quarter: 26–18, 18–25, 26–28, 26–16
Pts: Kawhi Leonard 29; Rebs: LaMarcus Aldridge 10; Asts: Tony Parker 7	Pts: Zach Randolph 20; Rebs: Barnes, Randolph 11 each Asts: Jordan Farmar 6
San Antonio leads series, 3–0

FedExForum, Memphis, Tennessee
Attendance: 18,119
Referees: Derrick Stafford, Kane Fitzgerald, Gary Zielinski

ABC

April 24
1:00 PM

Boxscore

San Antonio Spurs 116, Memphis Grizzlies 95
Scoring by quarter: 25–19, 22–26, 37–21, 32–29
Pts: Kawhi Leonard 21; Rebs: LaMarcus Aldridge 10; Asts: Kawhi Leonard 4	Pts: Lance Stephenson 26; Rebs: Chris Andersen 13; Asts: Jordan Farmar 5
San Antonio wins series, 4–0

FedExForum, Memphis, Tennessee
Attendance: 18,119
Referees: James Capers, John Goble, David Guthrie

Regular-season series
San Antonio won 4–0 in the regular-season series

November 21, 2015

Recap

Memphis Grizzlies 82, San Antonio Spurs 92

AT&T Center, San Antonio, Texas

December 3, 2015

Recap

San Antonio Spurs 103, Memphis Grizzlies 83

FedExForum, Memphis, Tennessee

March 25, 2016

Recap

Memphis Grizzlies 104, San Antonio Spurs 110

AT&T Center, San Antonio, Texas

March 28, 2016

Recap

San Antonio Spurs 101, Memphis Grizzlies 87

FedExForum, Memphis, Tennessee

This was the fourth playoff meeting between these two teams, with San Antonio winning the most recent meeting in 2013.

Previous playoff series
San Antonio leads 2–1 in all-time playoff series

2004

San Antonio Spurs 4, Memphis Grizzlies 0

2004 Western Conference First Round

2011

San Antonio Spurs 2, Memphis Grizzlies 4

2011 Western Conference First Round

2013

San Antonio Spurs 4, Memphis Grizzlies 0

2013 Western Conference Finals

==== (3) Oklahoma City Thunder vs. (6) Dallas Mavericks ====
ESPN

April 16
9:30 PM

Boxscore

Dallas Mavericks 70, Oklahoma City Thunder 108
Scoring by quarter: 11–26, 22–33, 18–34, 19–15
Pts: Dirk Nowitzki 18; Rebs: Pachulia, Powell 6 each Asts: Barea, Williams 3 each	Pts: Russell Westbrook 24; Rebs: Enes Kanter 13; Asts: Russell Westbrook 11
Oklahoma City leads series, 1–0

Chesapeake Energy Arena, Oklahoma City, Oklahoma
Attendance: 18,203
Referees: Monty McCutchen, Tony Brown, John Goble

TNT

April 18
8:00 PM

Boxscore

Dallas Mavericks 85, Oklahoma City Thunder 84
Scoring by quarter: 24–20, 21–23, 14–19, 26–22
Pts: Raymond Felton 21; Rebs: Raymond Felton 11; Asts: Deron Williams 5	Pts: Kevin Durant 21; Rebs: Russell Westbrook 14; Asts: Russell Westbrook 6
Series tied, 1–1

Chesapeake Energy Arena, Oklahoma City, Oklahoma
Attendance: 18,203
Referees: Danny Crawford, David Guthrie, Bill Spooner

TNT

April 21
7:00 PM

Boxscore

Oklahoma City Thunder 131, Dallas Mavericks 102
Scoring by quarter: 27–21, 31–27, 39–30, 34–24
Pts: Kevin Durant 34; Rebs: Enes Kanter 8 Asts: Russell Westbrook 15	Pts: Wesley Matthews 22; Rebs: Nowitzki, Pachulia 6 each Asts: José Juan Barea 7
Oklahoma City leads series, 2–1

American Airlines Center, Dallas
Attendance: 20,150
Referees: Mike Callahan, Sean Wright, Pat Fraher

ESPN

April 23
8:00 PM

Boxscore

Oklahoma City Thunder 119, Dallas Mavericks 108
Scoring by quarter: 33–18, 24–30, 32–31, 30–29
Pts: Enes Kanter 28; Rebs: Adams, Roberson 8 each Asts: Russell Westbrook 15	Pts: Dirk Nowitzki 27; Rebs: Dirk Nowitzki 8 Asts: Raymond Felton 11
Oklahoma City leads series, 3–1

American Airlines Center, Dallas
Attendance: 20,516
Referees: Ken Mauer, Ed Malloy, Sean Corbin

TNT

April 25
8:00 PM

Boxscore

Dallas Mavericks 104, Oklahoma City Thunder 118
Scoring by quarter: 24–35, 37–33, 22–25, 21–25
Pts: Dirk Nowitzki 24; Rebs: Dwight Powell 9 Asts: Zaza Pachulia 9	Pts: Russell Westbrook 36; Rebs: Russell Westbrook 12; Asts: Russell Westbrook 9
Oklahoma City wins series, 4–1

Chesapeake Energy Arena, Oklahoma City, Oklahoma
Attendance: 18,203
Referees: Scott Foster, Rodney Mott, Tom Washington

Regular-season series
Oklahoma City won 4–0 in the regular-season series

November 22, 2015

Recap

Dallas Mavericks 114, Oklahoma City Thunder 117

Chesapeake Energy Arena, Oklahoma City, Oklahoma

January 13, 2016

Recap

Dallas Mavericks 89, Oklahoma City Thunder 108

Chesapeake Energy Arena, Oklahoma City, Oklahoma

January 22, 2016

Recap

Oklahoma City Thunder 109, Dallas Mavericks 106

American Airlines Center, Dallas

February 24, 2016

Recap

Oklahoma City Thunder 116, Dallas Mavericks 103

American Airlines Center, Dallas

This was the fifth playoff meeting between these two teams, with each team winning two of the four meetings.

Previous playoff series
Tied 2–2 in all-time playoff series

1984

Dallas Mavericks 3, Seattle SuperSonics 2

1984 Western Conference First Round

1987

Dallas Mavericks 1, Seattle SuperSonics 3

1987 Western Conference First Round

2011

Dallas Mavericks 4, Oklahoma City Thunder 1

2011 Western Conference Finals

2012

Oklahoma City Thunder 4, Dallas Mavericks 0

2012 Western Conference First Round

- This is the most recent playoff series between the Thunder & Mavericks until 2024.

==== (4) Los Angeles Clippers vs. (5) Portland Trail Blazers ====
TNT

April 17
10:30 PM

Boxscore

Portland Trail Blazers 95, Los Angeles Clippers 115
Scoring by quarter: 21–26, 21–24, 24–31, 29–34
Pts: Damian Lillard 21; Rebs: Al-Farouq Aminu 12; Asts: Damian Lillard 8	Pts: Chris Paul 28; Rebs: Griffin, Jordan 12 each Asts: Chris Paul 11
LA Clippers lead series, 1–0

Staples Center, Los Angeles, California
Attendance: 19,122
Referees: Marc Davis, Bill Kennedy, Eric Lewis

TNT

April 20
10:30 PM

Boxscore

Portland Trail Blazers 81, Los Angeles Clippers 102
Scoring by quarter: 17–22, 26–25, 18–20, 20–35
Pts: Lillard, Plumlee 17 each Rebs: Aminu, Plumlee 10 each Asts: Mason Plumlee 7	Pts: Chris Paul 25; Rebs: DeAndre Jordan 18; Asts: Jordan, Paul 5 each
LA Clippers lead series, 2–0

Staples Center, Los Angeles, California
Attendance: 19,127
Referees: Derrick Stafford, Bill Kennedy, Leroy Richardson

ESPN

April 23
10:30 PM

Boxscore

Los Angeles Clippers 88, Portland Trail Blazers 96
Scoring by quarter: 19–22, 21–27, 27–21, 21–26
Pts: Chris Paul 26; Rebs: DeAndre Jordan 16; Asts: Chris Paul 9	Pts: Damian Lillard 32; Rebs: Mason Plumlee 21; Asts: Mason Plumlee 9
LA Clippers lead series, 2–1

Moda Center, Portland, Oregon
Attendance: 19,761
Referees: Scott Foster, Tony Brothers, Tom Washington

TNT

April 25
10:30 PM

Boxscore

Los Angeles Clippers 84, Portland Trail Blazers 98
Scoring by quarter: 20–24, 23–23, 21–19, 20–32
Pts: Green, Griffin 17 each Rebs: DeAndre Jordan 15; Asts: Chris Paul 4	Pts: Al-Farouq Aminu 30; Rebs: Mason Plumlee 14; Asts: Mason Plumlee 10
Series tied, 2–2

Moda Center, Portland, Oregon
Attendance: 19,607
Referees: Ken Mauer, Brian Forte, Ed Malloy

NBA TV

April 27
10:00 PM

Boxscore

Portland Trail Blazers 108, Los Angeles Clippers 98
Scoring by quarter: 18–18, 27–32, 26–21, 37–27
Pts: CJ McCollum 27; Rebs: Mason Plumlee 15; Asts: Damian Lillard 5	Pts: JJ Redick 19; Rebs: DeAndre Jordan 17; Asts: Crawford, Prigioni 4 each
Portland leads series, 3–2

Staples Center, Los Angeles, California
Attendance: 19,060
Referees: Danny Crawford, Ron Garretson, Bill Spooner

ESPN

April 29
10:30 PM

Boxscore

Los Angeles Clippers 103, Portland Trail Blazers 106
Scoring by quarter: 24–24, 24–26, 34–30, 21–26
Pts: Jamal Crawford 32; Rebs: DeAndre Jordan 20; Asts: Austin Rivers 8	Pts: Damian Lillard 28; Rebs: Mason Plumlee 14; Asts: Damian Lillard 7
Portland wins series, 4–2

Moda Center, Portland, Oregon
Attendance: 19,768
Referees: Marc Davis, Sean Wright, Zach Zarba

Regular-season series
Los Angeles won 3–1 in the regular-season series

November 20, 2015

Recap

Los Angeles Clippers 91, Portland Trail Blazers 102

Moda Center, Portland, Oregon

November 30, 2015

Recap

Portland Trail Blazers 87, Los Angeles Clippers 102

Staples Center, Los Angeles, California

January 6, 2016

Recap

Los Angeles Clippers 109, Portland Trail Blazers 98

Moda Center, Portland, Oregon

March 24, 2016

Recap

Portland Trail Blazers 94, Los Angeles Clippers 96

Staples Center, Los Angeles, California

This was the first meeting in the playoffs between the Clippers and Trail Blazers.

== Conference semifinals ==
=== Eastern Conference semifinals ===
==== (1) Cleveland Cavaliers vs. (4) Atlanta Hawks ====
TNT

May 2
7:00 PM

Boxscore

Atlanta Hawks 93, Cleveland Cavaliers 104
Scoring by quarter: 19–30, 22–21, 29–23, 23–30
Pts: Dennis Schröder 27; Rebs: Paul Millsap 13; Asts: Dennis Schröder 6	Pts: LeBron James 25; Rebs: Tristan Thompson 14; Asts: LeBron James 9
Cleveland leads series, 1–0

Quicken Loans Arena, Cleveland, Ohio
Attendance: 20,562
Referees: Scott Foster, Eric Lewis, Zach Zarba

TNT

May 4
8:00 PM

Boxscore

Atlanta Hawks 98, Cleveland Cavaliers 123
Scoring by quarter: 20–35, 18–39, 32–32, 28–17
Pts: Paul Millsap 16; Rebs: Paul Millsap 11; Asts: Jeff Teague 6	Pts: LeBron James 27; Rebs: Kevin Love 13; Asts: Dellavedova, Irving 6 each
Cleveland leads series, 2–0

Quicken Loans Arena, Cleveland, Ohio
Attendance: 20,562
Referees: Mike Callahan, Rodney Mott, Sean Wright

ESPN

May 6
7:00 PM

Boxscore

Cleveland Cavaliers 121, Atlanta Hawks 108
Scoring by quarter: 31–28, 24–35, 30–28, 36–17
Pts: Channing Frye 27; Rebs: Kevin Love 15; Asts: LeBron James 8	Pts: Al Horford 24; Rebs: Paul Millsap 8 Asts: Jeff Teague 14
Cleveland leads series, 3–0

Philips Arena, Atlanta
Attendance: 19,089
Referees: Danny Crawford, Tony Brothers, Ron Garretson

ABC

May 8
3:30 PM

Boxscore

Cleveland Cavaliers 100, Atlanta Hawks 99
Scoring by quarter: 27–36, 29–22, 25–19, 19–22
Pts: Kevin Love 27; Rebs: Kevin Love 13; Asts: LeBron James 9	Pts: Dennis Schröder 21; Rebs: Paul Millsap 9 Asts: Dennis Schröder 6
Cleveland wins series, 4–0

Philips Arena, Atlanta
Attendance: 19,031
Referees: Marc Davis, Bennie Adams, Jason Phillips

In Game 2, the Cavaliers made history by hitting 18 three-pointers in the first half and 25 overall to break the record for most three-point field goals made by a team in a game. During Game 3's final minute, Jeff Teague pushed LeBron James into a Hawks fan, James would later claim that he was still okay. In Game 4, both teams were locked in battle until in the final seconds, a jump ball was called between Dennis Schröder and LeBron James, and the Hawks desperately won the tip, but the game-winning shot by Paul Millsap bounced off the rim as the Cavs completed a second straight sweep.

This was the third time the Cavaliers swept the Hawks in the playoffs and it would be the second consecutive season the Cavaliers swept them.

Regular-season series
Cleveland won 3–0 in the regular-season series

November 21, 2015

Recap

Atlanta Hawks 97, Cleveland Cavaliers 109

Quicken Loans Arena, Cleveland, Ohio

April 1, 2016

Recap

Cleveland Cavaliers 110, Atlanta Hawks 108 (OT)

Philips Arena, Atlanta

April 11, 2016

Recap

Atlanta Hawks 94, Cleveland Cavaliers 109

Quicken Loans Arena, Cleveland, Ohio

This was the third playoff meeting between these two teams, with the Cavaliers winning the first two meetings.

Previous playoff series
Cleveland leads 2–0 in all-time playoff series.

2009

Cleveland Cavaliers 4, Atlanta Hawks 0

2009 Eastern Conference Semifinals

2015

Atlanta Hawks 0, Cleveland Cavaliers 4

2015 Eastern Conference Finals

==== (2) Toronto Raptors vs. (3) Miami Heat ====
TNT, TSN

May 3
8:00 PM

Boxscore

Miami Heat 102, Toronto Raptors 96 (OT)
Scoring by quarter: 18–18, 23–25, 27–20, 22–27, Overtime: 12–6
Pts: Goran Dragić 26; Rebs: Hassan Whiteside 17; Asts: Dwyane Wade 4	Pts: Jonas Valančiūnas 24; Rebs: Jonas Valančiūnas 14; Asts: Kyle Lowry 6
Miami leads series, 1–0

Air Canada Centre, Toronto, Ontario
Attendance: 19,800
Referees: Monty McCutchen, Jason Phillips, Josh Tiven

ESPN, SN1

May 5
8:00 PM

Boxscore

Miami Heat 92, Toronto Raptors 96 (OT)
Scoring by quarter: 19–29, 22–19, 24–15, 21–23, Overtime: 6–10
Pts: Goran Dragić 20; Rebs: Hassan Whiteside 13; Asts: Dragić, J. Johnson 4 each	Pts: DeMarre Carroll 21; Rebs: Jonas Valančiūnas 12; Asts: Kyle Lowry 6
Series tied, 1–1

Air Canada Centre, Toronto, Ontario
Attendance: 20,906
Referees: Ken Mauer, Derrick Collins, John Goble

ESPN, SN1

May 7
5:00 PM

Boxscore

Toronto Raptors 95, Miami Heat 91
Scoring by quarter: 23–19, 26–21, 19–28, 27–23
Pts: Kyle Lowry 33; Rebs: Jonas Valančiūnas 12; Asts: DeMar DeRozan 5	Pts: Dwyane Wade 38; Rebs: Dwyane Wade 8 Asts: Dwyane Wade 4
Toronto leads series, 2–1

AmericanAirlines Arena, Miami
Attendance: 19,675
Referees: Ed Malloy, James Capers, Kane Fitzgerald

TNT, TSN

May 9
8:00 PM

Boxscore

Toronto Raptors 87, Miami Heat 94 (OT)
Scoring by quarter: 21–25, 14–19, 27–16, 21–23, Overtime: 4–11
Pts: Joseph, Ross 14 each Rebs: Bismack Biyombo 13; Asts: Kyle Lowry 9	Pts: Dwyane Wade 30; Rebs: Luol Deng 9 Asts: Goran Dragić 4
Series tied, 2–2

AmericanAirlines Arena, Miami
Attendance: 19,600
Referees: Mike Callahan, Brian Forte, Bill Kennedy

TNT, TSN

May 11
8:00 PM

Boxscore

Miami Heat 91, Toronto Raptors 99
Scoring by quarter: 18–28, 27–27, 17–20, 29–24
Pts: Dwyane Wade 20; Rebs: Joe Johnson 8 Asts: T. Johnson, Wade 4 each	Pts: DeMar DeRozan 34; Rebs: Kyle Lowry 9 Asts: Kyle Lowry 6
Toronto leads series, 3–2

Air Canada Centre, Toronto, Ontario
Attendance: 20,155
Referees: Scott Foster, Tony Brothers, Sean Wright

ESPN, SN1

May 13
8:00 PM

Boxscore

Toronto Raptors 91, Miami Heat 103
Scoring by quarter: 20–21, 24–32, 28–29, 19–21
Pts: Kyle Lowry 36; Rebs: Bismack Biyombo 13; Asts: Kyle Lowry 3	Pts: Goran Dragić 30; Rebs: Goran Dragić 7 Asts: Dwyane Wade 5
Series tied, 3–3

AmericanAirlines Arena, Miami
Attendance: 19,757
Referees: Monty McCutchen, Sean Corbin, Marc Davis

ABC, TSN

May 15
3:30 PM

Boxscore

Miami Heat 89, Toronto Raptors 116
Scoring by quarter: 24–25, 23–28, 31–33, 11–30
Pts: Dragić, Wade 16 each Rebs: Justise Winslow 8 Asts: Goran Dragić 7	Pts: Kyle Lowry 35; Rebs: Bismack Biyombo 16; Asts: Kyle Lowry 9
Toronto wins series, 4–3

Air Canada Centre, Toronto, Ontario
Attendance: 20,257
Referees: Danny Crawford, James Capers, Zach Zarba

Even though the Raptors lost Game 1, Kyle Lowry hits a game-tying shot from half-court at the buzzer to force overtime. The play is similar to Chauncey Billups' half-court buzzer beater against the Nets in the 2004 playoffs, that also forced overtime. The end of Game 7 marks the Raptors' first ever trip to the Eastern Conference finals in their history.

Game 7 is noteworthy as being Dwyane Wade's last game with the Miami Heat (during his first stint with the team) as he would sign with the Chicago Bulls in the off-season. He would return to the Miami Heat in 2018 after being traded for a second-round pick by the Cleveland Cavaliers.

Regular-season series
Toronto won 3–1 in the regular-season series

November 8, 2015

Recap

Toronto Raptors 76, Miami Heat 96

AmericanAirlines Arena, Miami

December 18, 2015

Recap

Toronto Raptors 108, Miami Heat 94

AmericanAirlines Arena, Miami

January 22, 2016

Recap

Miami Heat 81, Toronto Raptors 101

Air Canada Centre, Toronto, Ontario

March 12, 2016

Recap

Miami Heat 104, Toronto Raptors 112 (OT)

Air Canada Centre, Toronto, Ontario

This was the first meeting in the playoffs between the Raptors and Heat.

=== Western Conference semifinals ===
==== (1) Golden State Warriors vs. (5) Portland Trail Blazers ====
ABC

May 1
3:30 PM

Boxscore

Portland Trail Blazers 106, Golden State Warriors 118
Scoring by quarter: 17–37, 34–28, 22–28, 33–25
Pts: Damian Lillard 30; Rebs: Mason Plumlee 13; Asts: Mason Plumlee 6	Pts: Klay Thompson 37; Rebs: Draymond Green 13; Asts: Draymond Green 11
Golden State leads series, 1–0

Oracle Arena, Oakland, California
Attendance: 19,596
Referees: Monty McCutchen, James Capers, John Goble

TNT

May 3
10:30 PM

Boxscore

Portland Trail Blazers 99, Golden State Warriors 110
Scoring by quarter: 34–21, 25–30, 28–25, 12–34
Pts: Damian Lillard 25; Rebs: Mason Plumlee 11; Asts: Damian Lillard 6	Pts: Klay Thompson 27; Rebs: Draymond Green 14; Asts: Draymond Green 7
Golden State leads series, 2–0

Oracle Arena, Oakland, California
Attendance: 19,596
Referees: Danny Crawford, Courtney Kirkland, Derrick Stafford

ABC

May 7
8:30 PM

Boxscore

Golden State Warriors 108, Portland Trail Blazers 120
Scoring by quarter: 28–22, 18–36, 34–35, 28–27
Pts: Draymond Green 37; Rebs: Draymond Green 9 Asts: Shaun Livingston 10	Pts: Damian Lillard 40; Rebs: Aminu, Davis 10 each Asts: Damian Lillard 10
Golden State leads series, 2–1

Moda Center, Portland, Oregon
Attendance: 19,673
Referees: Mike Callahan, Bill Kennedy, Pat Fraher

TNT

May 9
10:30 PM

Boxscore

Golden State Warriors 132, Portland Trail Blazers 125 (OT)
Scoring by quarter: 18–26, 39–41, 29–18, 25–26, Overtime: 21–14
Pts: Stephen Curry 40; Rebs: Bogut, Curry, Green 9 each Asts: Stephen Curry 8	Pts: Damian Lillard 36; Rebs: Mason Plumlee 15; Asts: Damian Lillard 10
Golden State leads series, 3–1

Moda Center, Portland, Oregon
Attendance: 19,583
Referees: Scott Foster, Ed Malloy, Tom Washington

TNT

May 11
10:30 PM

Boxscore

Portland Trail Blazers 121, Golden State Warriors 125
Scoring by quarter: 30–27, 33–31, 28–35, 30–32
Pts: Damian Lillard 28; Rebs: Al-Farouq Aminu 9 Asts: Damian Lillard 7	Pts: Klay Thompson 33; Rebs: Draymond Green 11; Asts: Stephen Curry 11
Golden State wins series, 4–1

Oracle Arena, Oakland, California
Attendance: 19,596
Referees: Ken Mauer, Marc Davis, James Williams

In Game 4, when Stephen Curry came back from his knee injury, he scored 40 points, along with an NBA record 17 points in overtime to lead the Warriors to a 132–125 win. They closed out the series in Game 5, to advance and face the Oklahoma City Thunder, who defeated the 67-win San Antonio Spurs in their second round matchup.

Regular-season series
Golden State won 3–1 in the regular-season series

January 8, 2016

Recap

Golden State Warriors 128, Portland Trail Blazers 108

Moda Center, Portland, Oregon

February 19, 2016

Recap

Golden State Warriors 105, Portland Trail Blazers 137

Moda Center, Portland, Oregon

March 11, 2016

Recap

Portland Trail Blazers 112, Golden State Warriors 128

Oracle Arena, Oakland, California

April 3, 2016

Recap

Portland Trail Blazers 111, Golden State Warriors 136

Oracle Arena, Oakland, California

This was the first meeting in the playoffs between the Warriors and Trail Blazers.

==== (2) San Antonio Spurs vs. (3) Oklahoma City Thunder ====
TNT

April 30
8:30 PM

Boxscore

Oklahoma City Thunder 92, San Antonio Spurs 124
Scoring by quarter: 20–43, 20–30, 26–32, 26–19
Pts: Serge Ibaka 19; Rebs: Steven Adams 10; Asts: Russell Westbrook 9	Pts: LaMarcus Aldridge 38; Rebs: Kyle Anderson 7 Asts: Tony Parker 12
San Antonio leads series, 1–0

AT&T Center, San Antonio
Attendance: 18,418
Referees: Scott Foster, Tony Brothers, David Guthrie

TNT

May 2
9:30 PM

Boxscore

Oklahoma City Thunder 98, San Antonio Spurs 97
Scoring by quarter: 29–21, 27–32, 21–23, 21–21
Pts: Russell Westbrook 29; Rebs: Steven Adams 17; Asts: Russell Westbrook 10	Pts: LaMarcus Aldridge 41; Rebs: Tim Duncan 9 Asts: Tony Parker 6
Series tied, 1–1

AT&T Center, San Antonio
Attendance: 18,418
Referees: Ken Mauer, Sean Corbin, Marc Davis

ESPN

May 6
9:30 PM

Boxscore

San Antonio Spurs 100, Oklahoma City Thunder 96
Scoring by quarter: 27–20, 20–22, 25–27, 28–27
Pts: Kawhi Leonard 31; Rebs: Kawhi Leonard 11; Asts: Tony Parker 5	Pts: Russell Westbrook 31; Rebs: Steven Adams 11; Asts: Russell Westbrook 8
San Antonio leads series, 2–1

Chesapeake Energy Arena, Oklahoma City, Oklahoma
Attendance: 18,203
Referees: Monty McCutchen, Derrick Stafford, James Williams

TNT

May 8
8:00 PM

Boxscore

San Antonio Spurs 97, Oklahoma City Thunder 111
Scoring by quarter: 27–17, 26–28, 28–32, 16–34
Pts: Tony Parker 22; Rebs: David West 7 Asts: Mills, Parker 3 each	Pts: Kevin Durant 41; Rebs: Steven Adams 11; Asts: Russell Westbrook 15
Series tied, 2–2

Chesapeake Energy Arena, Oklahoma City, Oklahoma
Attendance: 18,203
Referees: Danny Crawford, Bill Spooner, Zach Zarba

TNT

May 10
8:00 PM

Boxscore

Oklahoma City Thunder 95, San Antonio Spurs 91
Scoring by quarter: 22–16, 21–32, 26–24, 26–19
Pts: Russell Westbrook 35; Rebs: Enes Kanter 13; Asts: Russell Westbrook 9	Pts: Kawhi Leonard 26; Rebs: LaMarcus Aldridge 9 Asts: Tony Parker 5
Oklahoma City leads series, 3–2

AT&T Center, San Antonio
Attendance: 18,418
Referees: Monty McCutchen, John Goble, Jason Phillips

ESPN

May 12
8:30 PM

Boxscore

San Antonio Spurs 99, Oklahoma City Thunder 113
Scoring by quarter: 19–25, 12–30, 34–36, 34–22
Pts: Kawhi Leonard 22; Rebs: LaMarcus Aldridge 14; Asts: Kawhi Leonard 5	Pts: Kevin Durant 37; Rebs: Steven Adams 11; Asts: Russell Westbrook 12
Oklahoma City wins series, 4–2

Chesapeake Energy Arena, Oklahoma City, Oklahoma
Attendance: 18,203
Referees: Bill Kennedy, Mike Callahan, Kane Fitzgerald

- Game 6 is Tim Duncan's final NBA game.

Regular-season series
Tied 2–2 in the regular-season series

October 28, 2015

Recap

San Antonio Spurs 106, Oklahoma City Thunder 112

Chesapeake Energy Arena, Oklahoma City, Oklahoma

March 12, 2016

Recap

Oklahoma City Thunder 85, San Antonio Spurs 93

AT&T Center, San Antonio

March 26, 2016

Recap

San Antonio Spurs 92, Oklahoma City Thunder 111

Chesapeake Energy Arena, Oklahoma City, Oklahoma

April 12, 2016

Recap

Oklahoma City Thunder 98, San Antonio Spurs 102 (OT)

AT&T Center, San Antonio

This was the sixth playoff meeting between these two teams, with the Spurs winning four of the first five meetings.

Previous playoff series
San Antonio leads 4–1 in all-time playoff series

1982

San Antonio Spurs 4, Seattle SuperSonics 1

1982 Western Conference Semifinals

2002

San Antonio Spurs 3, Seattle SuperSonics 2

2002 Western Conference First Round

2005

San Antonio Spurs 4, Seattle SuperSonics 2

2005 Western Conference Semifinals

2012

San Antonio Spurs 2, Oklahoma City Thunder 4

2012 Western Conference Finals

2014

San Antonio Spurs 4, Oklahoma City Thunder 2

2014 Western Conference Finals

- This is the most recent playoff series between the Thunder & Spurs until 2026.

== Conference finals ==
=== Eastern Conference finals ===
==== (1) Cleveland Cavaliers vs. (2) Toronto Raptors ====
ESPN, SN1

May 17
8:30 PM

Boxscore

Toronto Raptors 84, Cleveland Cavaliers 115
Scoring by quarter: 28–33, 16–33, 23–29, 17–20
Pts: DeMar DeRozan 18; Rebs: Biyombo, Johnson, Lowry 4 each Asts: DeRozan, Lowry 5 each	Pts: Kyrie Irving 27; Rebs: Richard Jefferson 11; Asts: Kyrie Irving 5
Cleveland leads series, 1–0

Quicken Loans Arena, Cleveland, Ohio
Attendance: 20,562
Referees: Scott Foster, Sean Corbin, Jason Phillips

ESPN, TSN

May 19
8:30 PM

Boxscore

Toronto Raptors 89, Cleveland Cavaliers 108
Scoring by quarter: 28–30, 20–32, 21–24, 18–22
Pts: DeMar DeRozan 22; Rebs: Kyle Lowry 6 Asts: Patrick Patterson 4	Pts: Kyrie Irving 26; Rebs: Tristan Thompson 12; Asts: LeBron James 11
Cleveland leads series, 2–0

Quicken Loans Arena, Cleveland, Ohio
Attendance: 20,562
Referees: Danny Crawford, James Capers, Sean Wright

ESPN, SN1

May 21
8:30 PM

Boxscore

Cleveland Cavaliers 84, Toronto Raptors 99
Scoring by quarter: 24–27, 23–33, 23–20, 14–19
Pts: LeBron James 24; Rebs: James, Thompson 8 each Asts: LeBron James 5	Pts: DeMar DeRozan 32; Rebs: Bismack Biyombo 26; Asts: DeMar DeRozan 4
Cleveland leads series, 2–1

Air Canada Centre, Toronto, Ontario
Attendance: 20,207
Referees: Ken Mauer, Marc Davis, Pat Fraher

ESPN, TSN

May 23
8:30 PM

Boxscore

Cleveland Cavaliers 99, Toronto Raptors 105
Scoring by quarter: 24–27, 17–30, 28–21, 30–27
Pts: LeBron James 29; Rebs: James, Thompson 9 each Asts: Irving, James 6 each	Pts: Kyle Lowry 35; Rebs: Bismack Biyombo 14; Asts: Kyle Lowry 5
Series tied, 2–2

Air Canada Centre, Toronto, Ontario
Attendance: 20,367
Referees: Monty McCutchen, David Guthrie, Derrick Stafford

ESPN, SN1

May 25
8:30 PM

Boxscore

Toronto Raptors 78, Cleveland Cavaliers 116
Scoring by quarter: 19–37, 15–28, 26–35, 18–16
Pts: DeMar DeRozan 14; Rebs: Jason Thompson 5 Asts: Kyle Lowry 6	Pts: Kevin Love 25; Rebs: Tristan Thompson 10; Asts: LeBron James 8
Cleveland leads series, 3–2

Quicken Loans Arena, Cleveland, Ohio
Attendance: 20,562
Referees: Mike Callahan, Ed Malloy, Tom Washington

ESPN, TSN

May 27
8:30 PM

Boxscore

Cleveland Cavaliers 113, Toronto Raptors 87
Scoring by quarter: 31–25, 24–16, 31–33, 27–13
Pts: LeBron James 33; Rebs: Kevin Love 12; Asts: Kyrie Irving 9	Pts: Kyle Lowry 35; Rebs: Bismack Biyombo 9 Asts: DeRozan, Lowry 3 each
Cleveland wins series, 4–2

Air Canada Centre, Toronto, Ontario
Attendance: 20,605
Referees: Danny Crawford, Bill Kennedy, Jason Phillips

Games 1 and 2 were easy victories for the Cavaliers, as they pushed their playoff winning streak to 10 consecutive games. However, in Game 3, the Raptors dominated the first half, building up an 18-point lead, the largest deficit the Cavaliers faced all playoffs long. J.R. Smith's hot three-point shooting tried to lead Cleveland back, cutting the lead to 5, but the Raptors inevitably held on to win the game. DeMar DeRozan scored 32 points and Bismack Biyombo grabbed a Raptors' franchise record 26 rebounds. This loss by Cleveland ended their playoff winning streak at 10 games. Things would get worse in Game 4 as the Cavs were unable to slow down Kyle Lowry who scored 20 first-half points. Cleveland once again attempted a second half comeback, only this time they turned the game into a back and forth battle. Lowry's drive and score at the basket sealed the win for Toronto, tying the series at 2 games apiece. It was time for recovery for James and the Cavaliers in Game 5. They delivered yet another blowout victory, as they took a 3–2 series lead. The Raptors needed a win back home to force a decisive Game 7, but the Cavaliers closed out the series in Game 6 and won their second straight Eastern Conference title. For the sixth consecutive season, LeBron James advances to the NBA Finals, along with his teammate, James Jones.

Regular-season series
Toronto won 2–1 in the regular-season series

November 25, 2015

Recap

Cleveland Cavaliers 99, Toronto Raptors 103

Air Canada Centre, Toronto, Ontario

January 4, 2016

Recap

Toronto Raptors 100, Cleveland Cavaliers 122

Quicken Loans Arena, Cleveland, Ohio

February 26, 2016

Recap

Cleveland Cavaliers 97, Toronto Raptors 99

Air Canada Centre, Toronto, Ontario

This was the first ever meeting in any professional sports league's postseason between teams from Cleveland and Toronto. Teams from the two cities met again less than five months later (and again in the penultimate round of the playoffs) when the Cleveland Indians beat the Toronto Blue Jays in the 2016 American League Championship Series.

=== Western Conference finals ===
==== (1) Golden State Warriors vs. (3) Oklahoma City Thunder ====
TNT

May 16
9:00 PM

Boxscore

Oklahoma City Thunder 108, Golden State Warriors 102
Scoring by quarter: 21–27, 26–33, 38–28, 23–14
Pts: Russell Westbrook 27; Rebs: Steven Adams 12; Asts: Russell Westbrook 12	Pts: Stephen Curry 26; Rebs: Stephen Curry 10; Asts: Stephen Curry 7
Oklahoma City leads series, 1–0

Oracle Arena, Oakland, California
Attendance: 19,596
Referees: Monty McCutchen, Derrick Stafford, Tom Washington

TNT

May 18
9:00 PM

Boxscore

Oklahoma City Thunder 91, Golden State Warriors 118
Scoring by quarter: 20–27, 29–30, 19–31, 23–30
Pts: Kevin Durant 29; Rebs: Steven Adams 10; Asts: Russell Westbrook 12	Pts: Stephen Curry 28; Rebs: Draymond Green 8 Asts: Draymond Green 7
Series tied, 1–1

Oracle Arena, Oakland, California
Attendance: 19,596
Referees: Mike Callahan, Ed Malloy, Kane Fitzgerald

TNT

May 22
8:00 PM

Boxscore

Golden State Warriors 105, Oklahoma City Thunder 133
Scoring by quarter: 28–34, 19–38, 33–45, 25–16
Pts: Stephen Curry 24; Rebs: Brandon Rush 5 Asts: five players 3 each	Pts: Kevin Durant 33; Rebs: Enes Kanter 12; Asts: Russell Westbrook 12
Oklahoma City leads series, 2–1

Chesapeake Energy Arena, Oklahoma City, Oklahoma
Attendance: 18,203
Referees: Scott Foster, Tony Brothers, Zach Zarba

TNT

May 24
9:00 PM

Boxscore

Golden State Warriors 94, Oklahoma City Thunder 118
Scoring by quarter: 26–30, 27–42, 29–22, 12–24
Pts: Klay Thompson 26; Rebs: Draymond Green 11; Asts: Stephen Curry 5	Pts: Russell Westbrook 36; Rebs: André Roberson 12; Asts: Russell Westbrook 11
Oklahoma City leads series, 3–1

Chesapeake Energy Arena, Oklahoma City, Oklahoma
Attendance: 18,203
Referees: Danny Crawford, Bill Kennedy, John Goble

TNT

May 26
9:00 PM

Boxscore

Oklahoma City Thunder 111, Golden State Warriors 120
Scoring by quarter: 21–25, 29–33, 27–23, 34–39
Pts: Kevin Durant 40; Rebs: Steven Adams 10; Asts: Russell Westbrook 8	Pts: Stephen Curry 31; Rebs: Andrew Bogut 14; Asts: Andre Iguodala 8
Oklahoma City leads series, 3–2

Oracle Arena, Oakland, California
Attendance: 19,596
Referees: Ken Mauer, Marc Davis, James Capers

TNT

May 28
9:00 PM

Boxscore

Golden State Warriors 108, Oklahoma City Thunder 101
Scoring by quarter: 20–23, 28–30, 27–30, 33–18
Pts: Klay Thompson 41; Rebs: Draymond Green 12; Asts: Stephen Curry 9	Pts: Kevin Durant 29; Rebs: Adams, Ibaka, Westbrook 9 each Asts: Russell Westbrook 11
Series tied, 3–3

Chesapeake Energy Arena, Oklahoma City, Oklahoma
Attendance: 18,203
Referees: Monty McCutchen, Ed Malloy, Derrick Stafford

TNT

May 30
9:00 PM

Boxscore

Oklahoma City Thunder 88, Golden State Warriors 96
Scoring by quarter: 24–19, 24–23, 12–29, 28–25
Pts: Kevin Durant 27; Rebs: André Roberson 12; Asts: Russell Westbrook 13	Pts: Stephen Curry 36; Rebs: Draymond Green 9 Asts: Stephen Curry 8
Golden State wins series, 4–3

Oracle Arena, Oakland, California
Attendance: 19,596
Referees: Danny Crawford, Mike Callahan, Jason Phillips

During the Thunder-Warriors series, Draymond Green became the subject of multiple controversial plays against Oklahoma City players, most notably Steven Adams.

In Game 1, the Thunder upset the Warriors 108–102 and took a 1–0 series lead. It marked the Warriors' first loss at Oracle Arena in Oakland in the playoffs, as well as their third home loss of the season. In Game 2, despite a close game at the half, the Warriors soundly defeated the Thunder 118–91. Television cameras appeared to show Draymond Green kicking Steven Adams in the groin while he was attempting a layup. In Game 3, in the comfort of a raucous Chesapeake Energy Arena, the Thunder dominated the Warriors 133–105. During the game, Green received a flagrant foul 1 for again appearing to kick Adams in the groin. In Game 4, the Thunder once again handed the Warriors a commanding 118–94 defeat to take a 3–1 series lead as Russell Westbrook would put up a dominant performance in this game to record a triple double with 36 points, 11 rebounds and 11 assists. Returning to Oracle Arena in Game 5, the Warriors held on to defeat the Thunder 120–111, cutting their series deficit to 3–2. Kevin Durant scored 40 points in the loss. Despite their Game 5 loss, the Thunder were favored to advance to the NBA Finals in the comfort of their home court in Game 6, but the Warriors stunned the Thunder thanks to Klay Thompson, who scored a series-high 41 points and made an NBA playoff record 11 3s. Klay's performance and a poor shooting night from Kevin Durant, as the Warriors won the game 108–101 and tied the series 3-3, forcing a Game 7 in the Bay Area. In Game 7, Oklahoma City built a 13-point lead during the game and led 48–42 at halftime. However, the Thunder lost focus in the third quarter. After the Warriors thwarted Oklahoma City's brief comeback attempt in the fourth quarter, Golden State won 96–88 and became the 10th team to win an NBA playoff series after trailing 3–1. Game 7 was the last game Kevin Durant played with the Oklahoma City Thunder, before joining his opponent in this series, the Golden State Warriors.

Regular-season series
Golden State won 3–0 in the regular-season series

February 6, 2016

Recap

Oklahoma City Thunder 108, Golden State Warriors 116

Oracle Arena, Oakland, California

February 27, 2016

Recap

Golden State Warriors 121, Oklahoma City Thunder 118 (OT)

Chesapeake Energy Arena, Oklahoma City, Oklahoma

March 3, 2016

Recap

Oklahoma City Thunder 106, Golden State Warriors 121

Oracle Arena, Oakland, California

This was the third meeting in the playoffs between the Warriors and Thunder, with both teams tied at one a piece, though it was the first meeting in the playoffs between the teams since the latter team’s move to Oklahoma City.

Previous playoff series
Tied 1–1 in all-time playoff series

1975

Golden State Warriors 4, Seattle SuperSonics 2

1975 Western Conference Semifinals

1992

Golden State Warriors 1, Seattle SuperSonics 3

1992 Western Conference First Round

== NBA Finals: (E1) Cleveland Cavaliers vs. (W1) Golden State Warriors ==
ABC

June 2
9:00 PM

Boxscore

Cleveland Cavaliers 89, Golden State Warriors 104
Scoring by quarter: 24–28, 19–24, 25–22, 21–30
Pts: Kyrie Irving 26; Rebs: Kevin Love 13; Asts: LeBron James 9	Pts: Shaun Livingston 20; Rebs: Draymond Green 11; Asts: Draymond Green 7
Golden State leads series, 1–0

Oracle Arena, Oakland, California
Attendance: 19,596
Referees: Ken Mauer, Ed Malloy, Marc Davis

ABC

June 5
8:00 PM

Boxscore

Cleveland Cavaliers 77, Golden State Warriors 110
Scoring by quarter: 21–19, 23–33, 18–30, 15–28
Pts: LeBron James 19; Rebs: LeBron James 8 Asts: LeBron James 9	Pts: Draymond Green 28; Rebs: Stephen Curry 9 Asts: Green, Livingston, Thompson 5 each
Golden State leads series, 2–0

Oracle Arena, Oakland, California
Attendance: 19,596
Referees: Scott Foster, Tony Brothers, James Capers

ABC

June 8
9:00 PM

Boxscore

Golden State Warriors 90, Cleveland Cavaliers 120
Scoring by quarter: 16–33, 27–18, 26–38, 21–31
Pts: Stephen Curry 19; Rebs: Harrison Barnes 8 Asts: Draymond Green 7	Pts: LeBron James 32; Rebs: Tristan Thompson 13; Asts: Kyrie Irving 8
Golden State leads series, 2–1

Quicken Loans Arena, Cleveland, Ohio
Attendance: 20,562
Referees: Monty McCutchen, Derrick Stafford, Zach Zarba

ABC

June 10
9:00 PM

Boxscore

Golden State Warriors 108, Cleveland Cavaliers 97
Scoring by quarter: 29–28, 21–27, 29–22, 29–20
Pts: Stephen Curry 38; Rebs: Draymond Green 12; Asts: Andre Iguodala 7	Pts: Kyrie Irving 34; Rebs: LeBron James 13; Asts: LeBron James 9
Golden State leads series, 3–1

Quicken Loans Arena, Cleveland, Ohio
Attendance: 20,562
Referees: Danny Crawford, Mike Callahan, Jason Phillips

ABC

June 13
9:00 PM

Boxscore

Cleveland Cavaliers 112, Golden State Warriors 97
Scoring by quarter: 29–32, 32–29, 32–23, 19–13
Pts: Irving, James 41 each Rebs: LeBron James 16; Asts: LeBron James 7	Pts: Klay Thompson 37; Rebs: Andre Iguodala 11; Asts: Andre Iguodala 6
Golden State leads series, 3–2

Oracle Arena, Oakland, California
Attendance: 19,596
Referees: Monty McCutchen, Marc Davis and Derrick Stafford

ABC

June 16
9:00 PM

Boxscore

Golden State Warriors 101, Cleveland Cavaliers 115
Scoring by quarter: 11–31, 32–28, 28–21, 30–35
Pts: Stephen Curry 30; Rebs: Draymond Green 10; Asts: Draymond Green 6	Pts: LeBron James 41; Rebs: Tristan Thompson 16; Asts: LeBron James 11
Series tied, 3–3

Quicken Loans Arena, Cleveland, Ohio
Attendance: 20,562
Referees: Scott Foster, Ken Mauer and Jason Phillips

ABC

June 19
8:00 PM

Boxscore

Cleveland Cavaliers 93, Golden State Warriors 89
Scoring by quarter: 23–22, 19–27, 33–27, 18–13
Pts: LeBron James 27; Rebs: Kevin Love 14; Asts: LeBron James 11	Pts: Draymond Green 32; Rebs: Draymond Green 15; Asts: Draymond Green 9
Cleveland wins series, 4–3

Oracle Arena, Oakland, California
Attendance: 19,596
Referees: Danny Crawford, Mike Callahan, Monty McCutchen

After winning three of the first four games in the Finals with relative ease, the Warriors appeared to be overwhelming the Cavaliers as they moved to being within one win from back-to-back championships. However, the series shifted dramatically after Golden State's All-Star forward, Draymond Green, was suspended for game 5 after an altercation with Cleveland's LeBron James in game 4. Absent Green, the Warriors were lacking defensively, as Kyrie Irving and LeBron James became the first teammates to score 40 or more points each in a Finals game and led the Cavaliers to a 112–97 win to force game 6. Back in the Quicken Loans Arena for their final home game of the season, the Cavaliers tied the series at 3 games apiece by defeating Golden State, 115–101. After receiving his sixth personal foul in the fourth quarter, Stephen Curry was ejected for the first time in his career after throwing his mouthpiece at a Cavaliers fan. Game 7 came down to the wire. Late in the fourth quarter, with the score tied at 89, Andre Iguodala received a bounce pass from Curry. As Iguodala went up for the layup, he was blocked from behind by James, in what has since been recognized as one of the most memorable blocks in NBA playoff history, and among the most iconic plays of James's career. With less than a minute to play, Kyrie Irving converted a 3-point shot to give the Cavaliers the lead. On their next possession, James was fouled by Green while attempting a dunk, and made one of his two free throws to increase the lead to four. While the Warriors managed to get the ball into the hands of Curry for a chance to cut the deficit to one, he was guarded well by Cavaliers big man Kevin Love, and Curry was forced to take a sub par shot that missed, sealing the game as the city of Cleveland, Ohio's 52-year sports curse finally ended. The Cavaliers became the eleventh team to win an NBA playoff series after trailing 3–1, and the first to do so in the NBA Finals. The Warriors became the best team (by regular season record) to fail to capture an NBA championship. Cleveland also became only the fourth team to win Game 7 of the NBA Finals on the road. This was the first NBA championship for the Cavaliers.

Regular-season series
Golden State won 2–0 in the regular-season series

December 25, 2015

Recap

Cleveland Cavaliers 83, Golden State Warriors 89

Oracle Arena, Oakland, California

January 18, 2016

Recap

Golden State Warriors 132, Cleveland Cavaliers 98

Quicken Loans Arena, Cleveland, Ohio

This was the second meeting in the NBA Finals between the Warriors and Cavaliers, with the Warriors winning the first meeting last season.

Previous playoff series
Golden State leads 1–0 in all-time playoff series

2015

Golden State Warriors 4, Cleveland Cavaliers 2

2015 NBA Finals

== Statistical leaders ==
Category	High			Average			
Category	Player	Team	High	Player	Team	Avg.	Games played
Points	Paul Millsap	Atlanta Hawks	45	Kevin Durant	Oklahoma City Thunder	28.4	18
Rebounds	Bismack Biyombo	Toronto Raptors	26	DeAndre Jordan	Los Angeles Clippers	16.3	6
Assists	Russell Westbrook	Oklahoma City Thunder	15	Russell Westbrook	Oklahoma City Thunder	11.0	18
Steals	Russell Westbrook	Oklahoma City Thunder	7	Kawhi Leonard	San Antonio Spurs	2.60	9
Steals	James Harden	Houston Rockets	7	Trevor Ariza	Houston Rockets	2.60	5
Blocks	Draymond Green	Golden State Warriors	5	Myles Turner	Indiana Pacers	3.29	7

== Media coverage ==
=== Television ===
ESPN, TNT, ABC, ESPN2, ESPNews and NBA TV broadcast the NBA playoffs nationally in the United States. In the first round, regional sports networks affiliated with the teams can also broadcast the games, except for games televised on ABC. Throughout the first two rounds, TNT televised games Saturday through Thursday, ESPN televised games Friday and Saturday, and ABC televised select games on Saturday and Sunday, usually in the afternoon. NBA TV, ESPN2 and ESPNEWS aired select weekday games in the first round. TNT televised the Western Conference finals and ESPN televised the Eastern Conference finals. ABC televised the NBA Finals for the 14th consecutive year.

In Canada, national coverage is divided between the TSN and Sportsnet families of channels, with each group carrying approximately half of all games featuring the Toronto Raptors (produced independently of the U.S. national broadcasts regardless of round), and half of all other games (simulcast from the applicable U.S. broadcaster).

=== Radio ===
ESPN Radio had exclusive national radio rights to broadcast the playoffs in the United States. They broadcast mostly ABC games during the first two rounds, all of the conference finals, and the NBA Finals.

In Canada, the playoffs were carried on TSN Radio.
