= The Block (basketball) =

Play in Game 7 of the 2016 NBA Finals

Game 7 of the 2016 NBA Finals
- Photo of The Block
Cleveland Cavaliers	Golden State Warriors
93	89
Head coach: Tyronn Lue	Head coach: Steve Kerr
	1	2	3	4	Total
Cleveland Cavaliers	23	19	33	18	93
Golden State Warriors	22	27	27	13	89
- Date: June 19, 2016
- Venue: Oracle Arena, Oakland, California
- Referees: Danny Crawford, Mike Callahan, Monty McCutchen
- Attendance: 19,596

The Block was a defensive basketball play that occurred in Game 7 of the 2016 NBA Finals, played between the Cleveland Cavaliers and Golden State Warriors on June 19, 2016, at Oracle Arena in Oakland, California. With less than two minutes remaining in the deciding game of the championship series, Cavaliers forward LeBron James chased down Warriors forward Andre Iguodala and blocked his layup attempt, ensuring the game remained tied. It is considered to be one of James's greatest clutch moments, and his performance across the series—the only time in which a single player has led both teams in points, assists, rebounds, steals, and blocks—is considered to be one of the best in NBA Finals history.

The name echoes a series of bitter disappointments during Cleveland's 52-year championship drought, including The Drive, The Fumble, The Shot, The Catch, The Move, and James's own 2010 televised special, The Decision. Unlike these other events, however, "The Block" was in Cleveland's favor, and helped the Cavaliers win the city's first major sports title since 1964.

Golden State arrived at the NBA Finals as the 1st seed in the Western Conference, having broken the record for most wins ever in a regular season with a 73–9 regular season finish. Cleveland, meanwhile, finished atop the Eastern Conference with a 57–25 regular season record, the third-best in the league. Furthermore, the Warriors initially took a 3–1 series lead, before the Cavaliers managed to win the next two games to arrive at a decisive Game 7. Given these factors, the Cavaliers' victory is considered one of the most exciting in NBA history, and is considered among the biggest comebacks in the history of the major professional sports leagues in the US and Canada.

== The game ==
External videos
- Full game broadcast by ESPN on ABC on YouTube

The first half featured back-and-forth play from the two teams. Neither team was able to build a large lead like the previous six games. The Warriors built a 7-point lead early, but the Cavaliers bounced back to take the lead late in the first quarter. After a second quarter where neither team built a lead larger than 3, Golden State ended the half on an 11–4 run to take a 49–42 lead into the break.

Five straight points by Klay Thompson early in the third quarter gave the Warriors an 8-point lead at 54–46. Back-to-back 3-point field goals by shooting guard J.R. Smith and a layup by Kyrie Irving briefly tied the game at 54. Warriors' guard Stephen Curry made a layup in transition and a 3-pointer on the following possession to give Golden State a 59–54 lead. Cleveland responded with a 14–2 run — including 10 points from Irving — to take a 68–61 lead with 4 minutes left in the quarter. The Warriors then fired back with a 15–7 run to close out the quarter, taking a 76–75 lead into the final 12 minutes.

Scoring was slow early in the fourth quarter for both teams, but the Cavaliers built an 83–80 lead with 7 minutes left. The Warriors pushed back with a Curry 3, Thompson hitting a jump shot from the left corner, and Draymond Green converting a put-back layup on consecutive possessions to take an 87–83 lead with 5:39 left. LeBron James responded with six straight points, making three consecutive free throws after being fouled on a shot fake, and then connecting on his only 3-pointer of the night with 4:53 to play. After Thompson put in a layup off the glass with 4:39 left to tie the game, Golden State and Cleveland began trading missed chances. At this point, the score in the period was just 14–13 in favor of Cleveland. Both teams were tied at 699 points scored apiece in the series.

=== The Block ===
With 1:56 to play, Irving released a floater that bounced off the glass and was eventually corralled by Iguodala with the game tied at 89.

Iguodala immediately streaked up the floor as Curry sprinted ahead on the left wing. The only Cavaliers player who appeared to be in position to defend the fast break was Smith, who quickly began back-pedaling towards his own basket. James, standing in the corner in front of the Warriors bench, took off after them. Iguodala passed half court, then threw a chest pass to Curry, who immediately gave it back with a bounce pass. Iguodala gathered the ball and took two steps as he powered past Smith toward the hoop before going airborne. Good defense by Smith on the initial layup attempt forced Iguodala to delay the release of his shot by a few tenths of a second, double-pumping before softly floating the ball up toward the glass. James, who had been trailing the play the entire length of the floor, sized up the shot and sprung at the ball from behind, knocking the potential layup off the glass with 1:50 left. The ball was then rebounded by Smith, and brought back up the floor. This is cited both as a key sequence in deciding the outcome of the game, and as one of the most clutch defensive plays in NBA history. The Warriors did not score for the rest of the game.

=== Final game moments ===
James and Curry then traded misses, keeping the score level at 89–89. Irving then hit a three-pointer over Curry with 53 seconds left to give Cleveland the lead. Immediately after Irving's three, the Warriors brought the ball up-court, opting not to call a timeout, and although Golden State got a preferred switch and matchup of Curry on Kevin Love, Love made arguably "the biggest defensive stop of the entire NBA season", and forced Curry into a contested 3-pointer, which he missed. James would then go for a dunk, but was fouled by Draymond Green in the process. At the free throw line, he clinched the title for the Cavaliers by making one of two free throws. With the clock at 6.5 seconds, the Cavaliers fouled Green, who subsequently threw the inbound pass to Curry, who pump faked and shot a three-point attempt over Cavaliers guard Iman Shumpert. The attempt missed and was rebounded by Marreese Speights of the Warriors, who then missed an attempted three-pointer as time expired.

== Reaction to the play ==
After the game ended, James remarked to ESPN, "Iguodala is a bad motherfucker! I had to go chase it down."

James later recalled to Cleveland.com, "I was just like 'Do not give up on the play. If you got an opportunity, just try to make this play'. I was also thinking like, 'J.R., please don't foul him. I know I'm right there, I can get it, I can get it.' I was like, 'J.R., don't foul him, and Bron, get the ball before it hit the backboard.' And we did that."

Mike Breen, who called the Finals for ESPN on ABC, added: "It's just another example of how he's just not going to let them lose. That was the thought as well after he blocked the shot: This guy is just not going to let this team lose tonight." (Note: It was the Cavs' 110th game since the start of training camp, adding up preseason, regular-season and postseason contests, and James was playing in the 45th minute of the 47 he would log in Game 7 when he made The Block.)

Breen described the play thus:

Iguodala to Curry, back to Iguodala, up for the layup! Oh! Blocked by James! LeBron James with the rejection!

The play was referenced by Nicki Minaj in the song “Do You Mind” by DJ Khaled, which she was featured in later that summer. Minaj raps, "Any baller tryna score, check them shot clocks/But I hit 'em with them 'Bron Iguodala blocks."

Andre Iguodala later gave his own perspective on the play, stating: "I'm like, 'dunk on his head.'" He then expressed how he knew Smith would have stolen the ball had he attempted the dunk. "Man, just put the ball up. Don't do nothin' stupid. And it was one of the loudest sounds I ever heard, BOOM! (referring to James' block)."

== Box score ==
June 19, 2016
8:00 p.m.

Box score

Cleveland Cavaliers 93, Golden State Warriors 89
Scoring by quarter: 23–22, 19–27, 33–27, 18–13
Pts: James 27; Rebs: Love 14; Asts: James 11	Pts: Green 32; Rebs: Green 15; Asts: Green 9
Cleveland wins NBA Finals, 4–3

Oracle Arena, Oakland, California
Attendance: 19,596
Referees: Mike Callahan, Danny Crawford, Monty McCutchen

Cleveland Cavaliers
Player	Pos	Min	FGM	FGA	FG%	3PM	3PA	3P%	FTM	FTA	FT%	OREB	DREB	REB	AST	STL	BLK	TO	PF	PTS	+/−
LeBron James	F	46:49	9	24	.375	1	5	.200	8	10	.800	1	10	11	11	2	3	5	1	27	+4
Kyrie Irving	G	43:00	10	23	.435	2	5	.400	4	4	1.000	3	3	6	1	1	1	2	3	26	+10
J. R. Smith	G	38:55	5	13	.385	2	8	.250	0	0		0	4	4	2	1	0	2	3	12	+7
Tristan Thompson	C	31:49	3	3	1.000	0	0		3	4	.750	0	3	3	0	0	2	0	4	9	+2
Kevin Love	F	30:02	3	9	.333	0	3	.000	3	4	.750	4	10	14	3	2	0	1	2	9	+19
Richard Jefferson		25:30	1	4	.250	0	0		0	0		1	8	9	0	1	0	0	1	2	−8
Iman Shumpert		19:10	1	3	.333	1	3	.333	3	3	1.000	0	1	1	0	0	0	0	0	6	−9
Mo Williams		4:45	1	3	.333	0	1	.000	0	0		0	0	0	0	0	0	1	1	2	−5
Matthew Dellavedova		Did not play																			
Channing Frye		Did not play																			
Dahntay Jones		Did not play																			
James Jones		Did not play																			
Timofey Mozgov		Did not play																			
Team totals		240	33	82	.402	6	25	.240	21	25	.840	9	39	48	17	7	6	11	15	93	

Golden State Warriors
Player	Pos	Min	FGM	FGA	FG%	3PM	3PA	3P%	FTM	FTA	FT%	OREB	DREB	REB	AST	STL	BLK	TO	PF	PTS	+/−
Draymond Green	F	46:54	11	15	.733	6	8	.750	4	4	1.000	1	14	15	9	2	0	2	3	32	−1
Klay Thompson	G	42:17	6	17	.353	2	10	.200	0	0		1	1	2	2	1	0	3	2	14	−11
Stephen Curry	G	39:16	6	19	.316	4	14	.286	1	1	1.000	0	5	5	2	1	1	4	4	17	−3
Harrison Barnes	F	29:24	3	10	.300	2	4	.500	2	2	1.000	0	2	2	1	1	0	0	4	10	−6
Festus Ezeli	C	10:45	0	4	.000	0	0		0	0		0	1	1	1	0	0	0	2	0	−9
Andre Iguodala		37:53	2	6	.333	0	3	.000	0	2	.000	2	7	9	4	2	2	0	3	4	+3
Shaun Livingston		16:04	3	7	.429	0	0		2	2	1.000	1	0	1	2	0	0	1	1	8	+8
Anderson Varejão		8:29	0	1	.000	0	0		1	2	.500	0	0	0	1	0	0	0	3	1	−9
Marreese Speights		4:34	0	2	.000	0	1	.000	0	0		2	2	4	0	0	2	0	0	0	+3
Leandro Barbosa		4:24	1	2	.500	1	1	1.000	0	0		0	0	0	0	0	0	0	1	3	+5
Ian Clark		Did not play																			
James Michael McAdoo		Did not play																			
Brandon Rush		Did not play																			
Team totals		240	32	83	.386	15	41	.366	10	13	.769	7	32	39	22	7	5	10	23	89	
