= 2015–16 Cleveland Cavaliers season =

NBA professional basketball team season, first championship

- NBA champions
- Conference champions
- Division champions
- Head coach: Tyronn Lue
- General manager: David Griffin
- Owner: Dan Gilbert
- Arena: Quicken Loans Arena

Results
- Record: 57–25 (.695)
- Place: Division: 1st (Central); Conference: 1st (Eastern)
- Playoff finish: NBA champions (Defeated Warriors 4–3)
- Stats at Basketball Reference

Local media
- Television: Fox Sports Ohio
- Radio: WTAM; WMMS

The 2015–16 Cleveland Cavaliers season was the 46th season of the Cleveland Cavaliers franchise in the National Basketball Association (NBA). The Cavaliers won the 2016 NBA championship, the first NBA championship in franchise history. During the regular season, the Cavaliers had the third best team offensive rating and were tenth in team defensive rating in the NBA. During the playoffs, the Cavaliers had the best team offensive rating and were eighth in team defensive rating in the NBA.

In the playoffs, the Cavaliers swept the Detroit Pistons in four games in the first round, then swept the Atlanta Hawks in four games in the Semi-finals, before finally defeating the Toronto Raptors in six games in the Conference Finals to reach the NBA Finals for a second consecutive year. There, the Cavaliers faced off against the defending NBA champion Golden State Warriors, the team that defeated them in the previous year's NBA Finals in six games, and were coming off of the best regular-season record in NBA history at 73–9.

The Cavaliers would go on to defeat the Warriors in the 2016 NBA Finals in seven games, coming back from a 3–1 series deficit to avenge their loss from the prior year. The Cavaliers became the first team in NBA Finals history to recover from a 3–1 series deficit and win. The Cavaliers' victory also marked the first championship win by a major professional sports team from Cleveland since 1964, ending a 52–year championship drought dating back to the 1964 NFL title won by the Cleveland Browns. In addition, the Cleveland Cavaliers became the first NBA champion to represent the Central Division since the 2003–04 Detroit Pistons.

== Regular season summary ==
The Cavaliers started the season strong and rose to the top of the Eastern Conference. However, despite having the best record in their conference, the team fired head coach David Blatt on January 22, 2016. Assistant coach Tyronn Lue took over for the remainder of the season. The Cavaliers finished the regular season with a 57–25 record and obtained the number one seed in the Eastern Conference for the first time since 2010.

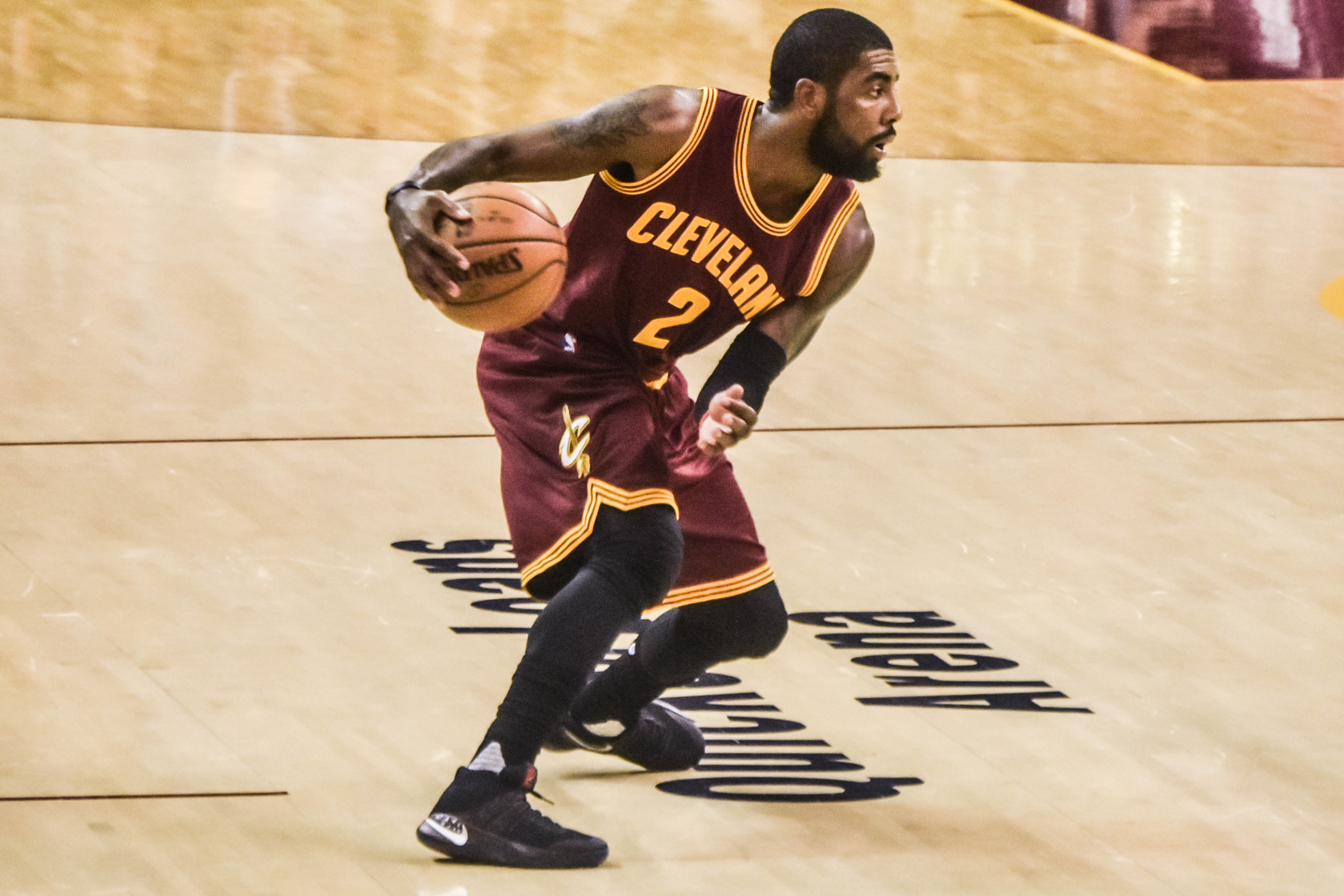
Team captain guard Kyrie Irving played his fifth season with Cleveland and hit the go-ahead shot in Game 7 of the NBA Finals.

== Postseason summary ==
In the 2016 NBA Playoffs' first round, the Cleveland Cavaliers matched up against the 8th seed Detroit Pistons. In the first game of their series, Cleveland's point guard Kyrie Irving led the way scoring 31 points and sealing a win for the Cavaliers, 106–101. The Cavs swept the rest of the series, winning 107–90 in Game 2, 101–91 in Game 3, and 100–98 in Game 4. Kyrie Irving was the top scorer of the series averaging 27.5 points per game, LeBron James led the Cleveland Cavaliers in this series in assist and steals, averaging 6.8 assists and 1.8 steals, and big man Kevin Love led Cleveland in rebounds averaging 12 total rebounds per game. The Cavaliers were matched with the number four seed, Atlanta Hawks, for their second series in the 2015-2016 post-season. Similar to their last series, they swept their opponents 4–0. LeBron James led the way in scoring, averaging 24.3 points per game. He also led his team in assists and steals, averaging 7.8 assists and 3 steals per game. Kevin Love was the rebound leader for the series averaging 13 rebounds per game. The Cavaliers were now facing the Toronto Raptors in the Eastern Conference Finals. The series between the Raptors and the Cavaliers took 6 games to finish with Cleveland winning 4 to 2. This was the first time in their 2015-2016 playoff run that they lost a game. LeBron James led his team in all major stats against the Toronto Raptors. He averaged 26 points, 8.5 rebounds, and 6.7 assists in the 6-game series. The Cavaliers were off to face the Golden State Warriors in the NBA finals. They were considered huge underdogs because the Warriors had accomplished an incredible feat in the regular season, seventy-three wins and nine losses, the best record ever in the NBA.

The Cavaliers lost three of the first four games of the 2016 NBA Finals to the Golden State Warriors, who had defeated Cleveland in the Finals the year before. The first two games were blowouts for Golden State, 104–89 and 110–77 respectively, combining for a total winning margin of 48. Cleveland would respond with a 120–90 blowout of their own to cut the series deficit to 2–1, but the Warriors would pull away late in Game 4 to take a decisive 3–1 series lead. In turn, the Cavaliers won Games 5 and 6 of the series to bring about a climactic Game 7 at Oracle Arena.

With Game 7 tied at 89–89, LeBron James chased down and blocked Andre Iguodala's attempted lay-up in a play that became known as "The Block." The Cavaliers ultimately won Game 7, 93–89, for the first NBA championship in franchise history. Until then, no team had recovered from a 3–1 deficit in an NBA Finals series. James was named the unanimous NBA Finals MVP, receiving the award for the third time in his career.

This win ended a fifty-two year championship drought in the city of Cleveland, with the last championship that any major sports team had won there being in 1964 when the Cleveland Browns won an NFL season. In addition, this championship was LeBron's first to not be with the Miami Heat.

== Draft picks ==
Round	Pick	Player	Position	Nationality	College/Club team
1	24	Tyus Jones	PG	United States	Duke
2	53	Sir'Dominic Pointer	SG / SF	United States	St. John's

== Roster ==
2015–16 Cleveland Cavaliers roster
Players

Pos.	No.	Player	Height	Weight	DOB	From
C	9	Channing Frye	6 ft 11 in (2.11 m)	255 lb (116 kg)	1983-05-17	Arizona
PG	8	Matthew Dellavedova	6 ft 4 in (1.93 m)	198 lb (90 kg)	1990-09-08	Saint Mary’s
PG	2	Kyrie Irving	6 ft 3 in (1.91 m)	193 lb (88 kg)	1992-03-23	Duke
SF	23	LeBron James	6 ft 8 in (2.03 m)	250 lb (113 kg)	1984-12-30	St. Vincent–St. Mary HS (OH)
SF	24	Richard Jefferson	6 ft 7 in (2.01 m)	233 lb (106 kg)	1980-06-21	Arizona
SF	30	Dahntay Jones	6 ft 6 in (1.98 m)	225 lb (102 kg)	1980-12-27	Duke
SF	1	James Jones	6 ft 8 in (2.03 m)	218 lb (99 kg)	1980-10-04	Miami (FL)
C	14	Sasha Kaun	6 ft 11 in (2.11 m)	260 lb (118 kg)	1985-05-08	Kansas
PF	0	Kevin Love	6 ft 10 in (2.08 m)	251 lb (114 kg)	1988-09-07	UCLA
PG	12	Jordan McRae	6 ft 5 in (1.96 m)	179 lb (81 kg)	1991-03-28	Tennessee
C	20	Timofey Mozgov	7 ft 3 in (2.21 m)	275 lb (125 kg)	1986-07-16	Russia
SG	4	Iman Shumpert	6 ft 5 in (1.96 m)	220 lb (100 kg)	1990-06-26	Georgia Tech
SG	5	J. R. Smith	6 ft 6 in (1.98 m)	225 lb (102 kg)	1985-09-09	St. Benedict's Prep (NJ)
F/C	13	Tristan Thompson	6 ft 9 in (2.06 m)	238 lb (108 kg)	1991-03-13	Texas
PG	52	Mo Williams	6 ft 1 in (1.85 m)	198 lb (90 kg)	1982-12-19	Alabama

Coaches
Head coach
- David Blatt (fired)
- Tyronn Lue
Assistant(s)
- Jim Boylan
- Bret Brielmaier
- Larry Drew
- Phil Handy (player development)
- Mike Longabardi
- James Posey
- Vitaly Potapenko (player development)

Legend
- (DP) Unsigned draft pick
- (FA) Free agent
- (S) Suspended
- Injured

Roster
Updated: April 13, 2016

== Player statistics ==
Legend
GP	Games played	GS	Games started	MPG	Minutes per game
FG%	Field-goal percentage	3P%	3-point field-goal percentage	FT%	Free-throw percentage
RPG	Rebounds per game	APG	Assists per game	SPG	Steals per game
BPG	Blocks per game	PPG	Points per game

=== Regular season ===
Player	GP	GS	MIN	FG%	FT%	3FG%	STL	BLK	AST	REB	PTS
LeBron James	76	76	35.6	52.0%	73.1%	30.9%	1.4	.60	6.8	7.4	25.3
Kyrie Irving	53	53	31.5	44.8%	88.5%	32.1%	1.1	.30	4.7	3.0	19.6
Kevin Love	77	77	31.5	41.9%	82.2%	36.0%	.80	.50	2.4	9.9	16.0
J.R. Smith	77	77	30.7	41.5%	63.4%	40.0%	1.1	.30	1.7	2.8	12.4
Tristan Thompson	82	34	27.7	58.8%	61.6%	0%	.50	.60	.6	9.0	7.8
Matthew Dellavedova	76	14	24.6	40.5%	86.4%	41.0%	.60	.10	4.4	2.1	7.5
Iman Shumpert	54	5	24.4	37.4%	78.4%	29.5%	1.0	.40	1.7	3.8	5.8
Mo Williams	41	14	18.2	43.7%	90.5%	35.3%	.30	.10	2.4	1.9	8.2
Richard Jefferson	74	5	17.9	45.8%	66.7%	38.2%	.40	.20	.8	1.7	5.5
Timofey Mozgov	76	48	17.4	56.5%	71.6%	14.3%	.30	.80	.4	4.4	6.3
Channing Frye	26	3	17.2	44.1%	78.6%	37.7%	.30	.30	1.0	3.6	7.5
Anderson Varejao	31	0	10.0	42.1%	76.2%	0%	.40	.20	.6	2.9	2.6
James Jones	48	0	9.6	40.8%	80.8%	39.4%	.20	.20	.3	1.0	3.7
Jared Cunningham	40	3	8.9	35.2%	62.5%	31.3%	.30	.10	.5	0.7	2.6
Jordan McRae	15	1	7.5	44.2%	69.2%	63.6%	.00	.10	1.0	0.8	4.1
Sasha Kaun	25	0	3.8	52.9%	45.5%	0%	.20	.20	.10	1.0	0.9
Joe Harris	5	0	3.0	25.0%	0%	25.0%	.00	.00	0.4	.6	0.6

== Standings ==
Eastern Conference
#	Team	W	L	PCT	GB	GP
1	c – Cleveland Cavaliers *	57	25	.695	–	82
2	y – Toronto Raptors *	56	26	.683	1.0	82
3	y – Miami Heat *	48	34	.585	9.0	82
4	x – Atlanta Hawks	48	34	.585	9.0	82
5	x – Boston Celtics	48	34	.585	9.0	82
6	x – Charlotte Hornets	48	34	.585	9.0	82
7	x – Indiana Pacers	45	37	.549	12.0	82
8	x – Detroit Pistons	44	38	.537	13.0	82
9	e – Chicago Bulls	42	40	.512	15.0	82
10	e – Washington Wizards	41	41	.500	16.0	82
11	e – Orlando Magic	35	47	.427	22.0	82
12	e – Milwaukee Bucks	33	49	.402	24.0	82
13	e – New York Knicks	32	50	.390	25.0	82
14	e – Brooklyn Nets	21	61	.256	36.0	82
15	e – Philadelphia 76ers	10	72	.122	47.0	82

Central Division	W	L	PCT	GB	Home	Road	Div	GP
c – Cleveland Cavaliers	57	25	.695	–	33‍–‍8	24‍–‍17	8–8	82
x – Indiana Pacers	45	37	.549	12.0	26‍–‍15	19‍–‍22	8–8	82
x – Detroit Pistons	44	38	.537	13.0	26‍–‍15	18‍–‍23	10–6	82
e – Chicago Bulls	42	40	.512	15.0	26‍–‍15	16‍–‍25	10–6	82
e – Milwaukee Bucks	33	49	.402	24.0	23‍–‍18	10‍–‍31	4–12	82

== Preseason ==
2015 pre-season game log
Total: 1–6 (Home: 1–4; Road: 0–2)
Pre-season: 1–6 (home: 1–4; road: 0–2)

Game	Date	Team	Score	High points	High rebounds	High assists	Location Attendance	Record
1	October 7; 7:00 pm	Atlanta	96–98	J. R. Smith (15)	LeBron James (7)	LeBron James (5)	Cintas Center; 10,250	0–1
2	October 8; 7:00 pm	@ Philadelphia	114–115	Jared Cunningham (31)	Austin Daye (9)	Matthew Dellavedova (5)	Wells Fargo Center; 8,229	0–2
3	October 12; 7:00 pm	Memphis	81–91	LeBron James (14)	Anderson Varejão (7)	Matthew Dellavedova (4)	Schottenstein Center; 18,073	0–3
4	October 13; 7:00 pm	Milwaukee	101–110	Mo Williams (18)	Kaun, Williams (6)	Cook, Williams (4)	Quicken Loans Arena; 18,624	0–4
5	October 15; 7:00 pm	Indiana	85–107	Timofey Mozgov (16)	Anderson Varejão (7)	Jared Cunningham (6)	Quicken Loans Arena; 18,774	0–5
6	October 18; 8:00 pm	@ Toronto	81–87	Mo Williams (13)	Timofey Mozgov (11)	Dellavedova, Varejão (5)	Air Canada Centre; 19,800	0–6
7	October 19; 7:00 pm	Dallas	103–97	J. R. Smith (19)	Jack Cooley (15)	Cunningham, Dellavedova (5)	Quicken Loans Arena; 18,768	1–6

2015–16 season schedule

== Regular season game log ==
2015–16 game log
Total: 57–25 (Home: 33–8; Road: 24–17)
October: 2–1 (home: 1–0; road: 1–1)

Game	Date	Team	Score	High points	High rebounds	High assists	Location Attendance	Record
1	October 27	@ Chicago	L 95–97	LeBron James (25)	Tristan Thompson (12)	Mo Williams (7)	United Center; 21,957	0–1
2	October 28	@ Memphis	W 106–76	Kevin Love (17)	Kevin Love (13)	J. R. Smith (7)	FedExForum; 18,119	1–1
3	October 30	Miami	W 102–92	LeBron James (29)	Kevin Love (14)	Matthew Dellavedova (10)	Quicken Loans Arena; 20,562	2–1

November : 11–3 (home: 8–0; road: 3–3)

Game	Date	Team	Score	High points	High rebounds	High assists	Location Attendance	Record
4	November 2	@ Philadelphia	W 107–100	LeBron James (22)	James, Thompson (9)	LeBron James (11)	Wells Fargo Center; 18,094	3–1
5	November 4	New York	W 96–86	LeBron James (23)	Tristan Thompson (13)	Matthew Dellavedova (7)	Quicken Loans Arena; 20,562	4–1
6	November 6	Philadelphia	W 108–102	LeBron James (31)	Kevin Love (14)	LeBron James (13)	Quicken Loans Arena; 20,562	5–1
7	November 8	Indiana	W 101–97	LeBron James (29)	Kevin Love (15)	Matthew Dellavedova (9)	Quicken Loans Arena; 20,562	6–1
8	November 10	Utah	W 118–114	LeBron James (31)	Kevin Love (8)	LeBron James (8)	Quicken Loans Arena; 20,562	7–1
9	November 13	@ New York	W 90–84	LeBron James (31)	Kevin Love (11)	LeBron James (6)	Madison Square Garden; 19,812	8–1
10	November 14	@ Milwaukee	L 105–108 (2OT)	LeBron James (37)	Kevin Love (14)	Matthew Dellavedova (7)	BMO Harris Bradley Center; 18,717	8–2
11	November 17	@ Detroit	L 99–104	LeBron James (30)	Love, Thompson (9)	Mo Williams (7)	The Palace of Auburn Hills; 18,442	8–3
12	November 19	Milwaukee	W 115–100	LeBron James (27)	Kevin Love (15)	Matthew Dellavedova (13)	Quicken Loans Arena; 20,562	9–3
13	November 21	Atlanta	W 109–97	Kevin Love (25)	Tristan Thompson (16)	LeBron James (8)	Quicken Loans Arena; 20,562	10–3
14	November 23	Orlando	W 117–103	Kevin Love (34)	Tristan Thompson (14)	LeBron James (13)	Quicken Loans Arena; 20,562	11–3
15	November 25	@ Toronto	L 99–103	LeBron James (24)	Kevin Love (13)	LeBron James (8)	Air Canada Centre; 20,140	11–4
16	November 27	@ Charlotte	W 95–90	LeBron James (25)	Kevin Love (16)	James, Dellavedova (5)	Time Warner Cable Arena; 19,093	12–4
17	November 28	Brooklyn	W 90–88	James, Love (26)	Tristan Thompson (11)	Matthew Dellavedova (6)	Quicken Loans Arena; 20,562	13–4

December : 8–5 (home: 4–1; road: 4–4)

Game	Date	Team	Score	High points	High rebounds	High assists	Location Attendance	Record
18	December 1	Washington	L 85–97	LeBron James (24)	LeBron James (13)	LeBron James (4)	Quicken Loans Arena; 20,562	13–5
19	December 4	@ New Orleans	L 108–114 (OT)	LeBron James (37)	Love, Thompson (10)	LeBron James (8)	Smoothie King Center; 17,906	13–6
20	December 5	@ Miami	L 84–99	Richard Jefferson (18)	Kevin Love (8)	Matthew Dellavedova (5)	American Airlines Arena; 19,600	13–7
21	December 8	Portland	W 105–100	LeBron James (33)	LeBron James (10)	Kevin Love (4)	Quicken Loans Arena; 20,562	14–7
22	December 11	@ Orlando	W 111–76	LeBron James (25)	Kevin Love (13)	LeBron James (8)	Amway Center; 17,239	15–7
23	December 15	@ Boston	W 89–77	LeBron James (24)	Timofey Mozgov (10)	Kevin Love (5)	TD Garden; 18,624	16–7
24	December 17	Oklahoma City	W 104–100	LeBron James (33)	Tristan Thompson (15)	LeBron James (11)	Quicken Loans Arena; 20,562	17–7
25	December 20	Philadelphia	W 108–86	LeBron James (23)	Timofey Mozgov (8)	Irving, James, Smith, Shumpert (4)	Quicken Loans Arena; 20,562	18–7
26	December 23	New York	W 91–84	LeBron James (24)	Kevin Love (13)	Matthew Dellavedova (7)	Quicken Loans Arena; 20,562	19–7
27	December 25	@ Golden State	L 83–89	LeBron James (25)	Kevin Love (18)	Kevin Love (4)	Oracle Arena; 19,596	19–8
28	December 26	@ Portland	L 76–105	Kevin Love (13)	Tristan Thompson (11)	Matthew Dellavedova (6)	Moda Center; 19,393	19–9
29	December 28	@ Phoenix	W 101–97	Kyrie Irving (22)	Tristan Thompson (10)	LeBron James (7)	Talking Stick Resort Arena; 18,319	20–9
30	December 29	@ Denver	W 93–87	LeBron James (34)	Kevin Love (14)	Matthew Dellavedova (5)	Pepsi Center; 17,523	21–9

January : 13–3 (home: 6–2; road: 7–1)

Game	Date	Team	Score	High points	High rebounds	High assists	Location Attendance	Record
31	January 2	Orlando	W 104–79	LeBron James (29)	Kevin Love (13)	Matthew Dellavedova (6)	Quicken Loans Arena; 20,562	22–9
32	January 4	Toronto	W 122–100	Kyrie Irving (25)	Tristan Thompson (11)	Kyrie Irving (8)	Quicken Loans Arena; 20,562	23–9
33	January 6	@ Washington	W 121–115	LeBron James (34)	LeBron James (10)	LeBron James (4)	Verizon Center; 20,356	24–9
34	January 8	@ Minnesota	W 125–99	J.R. Smith (27)	LeBron James (12)	LeBron James (8)	Target Center; 16,768	25–9
35	January 10	@ Philadelphia	W 95–85	LeBron James (37)	Kevin Love (15)	LeBron James (9)	Wells Fargo Center; 19,226	26–9
36	January 12	@ Dallas	W 110–107 (OT)	LeBron James (27)	Kevin Love (11)	Kyrie Irving (9)	American Airlines Center; 20,347	27–9
37	January 14	@ San Antonio	L 95–99	LeBron James (22)	Tristan Thompson (11)	LeBron James (4)	AT&T Center; 18,418	27–10
38	January 15	@ Houston	W 91–77	Kyrie Irving (23)	Kevin Love (13)	LeBron James (7)	Toyota Center; 18,320	28–10
39	January 18	Golden State	L 98–132	LeBron James (16)	Kevin Love (6)	Matthew Dellavedova (6)	Quicken Loans Arena; 20,562	28–11
40	January 20	@ Brooklyn	W 91–78	James, Love (17)	Kevin Love (18)	Irving, James (5)	Barclays Center; 17,732	29–11
41	January 21	L.A. Clippers	W 115–102	James, Smith (22)	Kevin Love (16)	LeBron James (12)	Quicken Loans Arena; 20,562	30–11
42	January 23	Chicago	L 83–96	LeBron James (26)	LeBron James (13)	LeBron James (9)	Quicken Loans Arena; 20,562	30–12
43	January 25	Minnesota	W 114–107	LeBron James (25)	Tristan Thompson (12)	LeBron James (9)	Quicken Loans Arena; 20,562	31–12
44	January 27	Phoenix	W 115–93	James, Love (21)	Kevin Love (11)	LeBron James (9)	Quicken Loans Arena; 20,562	32–12
45	January 29	@ Detroit	W 114–106	Kevin Love (29)	Tristan Thompson (14)	LeBron James (8)	The Palace of Auburn Hills; 21,012	33–12
46	January 30	San Antonio	W 117–103	LeBron James (29)	Kevin Love (11)	LeBron James (7)	Quicken Loans Arena; 20,562	34–12

February : 8–5 (home: 6–2; road: 2–3)

Game	Date	Team	Score	High points	High rebounds	High assists	Location Attendance	Record
47	February 1	@ Indiana	W 111–106 (OT)	Kyrie Irving (25)	James, Thompson (12)	Kyrie Irving (7)	Bankers Life Fieldhouse; 17,283	35–12
48	February 3	@ Charlotte	L 97–106	Kyrie Irving (26)	Kevin Love (12)	LeBron James (6)	Time Warner Cable Arena; 19,189	35–13
49	February 5	Boston	L 103–104	LeBron James (30)	Tristan Thompson (10)	Kyrie Irving (6)	Quicken Loans Arena; 20,562	35–14
50	February 6	New Orleans	W 99–84	Kyrie Irving (29)	Tristan Thompson (15)	LeBron James (8)	Quicken Loans Arena; 20,562	36–14
51	February 8	Sacramento	W 120–100	Kyrie Irving (32)	James, Thompson (10)	Kyrie Irving (12)	Quicken Loans Arena; 20,562	37–14
52	February 10	L.A. Lakers	W 120–111	Kyrie Irving (35)	Tristan Thompson (13)	LeBron James (11)	Quicken Loans Arena; 20,562	38–14
All-Star Break
53	February 18	Chicago	W 106–95	LeBron James (25)	Kevin Love (12)	LeBron James (9)	Quicken Loans Arena; 20,562	39–14
54	February 21	@ Oklahoma City	W 115–92	Kevin Love (29)	Tristan Thompson (11)	LeBron James (9)	Chesapeake Energy Arena; 18,203	40–14
55	February 22	Detroit	L 88–96	Kyrie Irving (30)	LeBron James (8)	Irving, James (5)	Quicken Loans Arena; 20,562	40–15
56	February 24	Charlotte	W 114–103	Irving, James (23)	Tristan Thompson (10)	Dellavedova, James (7)	Quicken Loans Arena; 20,562	41–15
57	February 26	@ Toronto	L 97–99	LeBron James (25)	Tristan Thompson (9)	LeBron James (7)	Air Canada Centre; 19,800	41–16
58	February 28	@ Washington	L 99–115	Kyrie Irving (28)	Timofey Mozgov (10)	Kyrie Irving (6)	Verizon Center; 20,356	41–17
59	February 29	Indiana	W 100–96	LeBron James (33)	Tristan Thompson (11)	Irving, Love (6)	Quicken Loans Arena; 20,562	42–17

March : 11–5 (home: 6–2; road: 5–3)

Game	Date	Team	Score	High points	High rebounds	High assists	Location Attendance	Record
60	March 4	Washington	W 108–83	Kyrie Irving (21)	LeBron James (13)	Kyrie Irving (8)	Quicken Loans Arena; 20,562	43–17
61	March 5	Boston	W 120–103	LeBron James (28)	Iman Shumpert (16)	LeBron James (8)	Quicken Loans Arena; 20,562	44–17
62	March 7	Memphis	L 103–106	LeBron James (28)	Kevin Love (11)	Irving, James (5)	Quicken Loans Arena; 20,562	44–18
63	March 9	@ Sacramento	W 120–111	Kyrie Irving (30)	LeBron James (11)	LeBron James (6)	Sleep Train Arena; 17,317	45–18
64	March 10	@ L.A. Lakers	W 120–108	Kyrie Irving (26)	Tristan Thompson (14)	Kyrie Irving (9)	Staples Center; 18,997	46–18
65	March 13	@ L.A. Clippers	W 114–90	LeBron James (27)	Tristan Thompson (14)	Irving, James (5)	Staples Center; 19,342	47–18
66	March 14	@ Utah	L 85–94	LeBron James (23)	LeBron James (12)	Matthew Dellavedova (5)	Vivint Smart Home Arena; 19,911	47–19
67	March 16	Dallas	W 99–98	Kyrie Irving (33)	Kevin Love (18)	Matthew Dellavedova (7)	Quicken Loans Arena; 20,562	48–19
68	March 18	@ Orlando	W 109–103	Kyrie Irving (26)	Tristan Thompson (15)	LeBron James (8)	Amway Center; 18,046	49–19
69	March 19	@ Miami	L 101–122	LeBron James (26)	Frye, Jefferson, Mozgov (4)	Irving, Shumpert (4)	American Airlines Arena; 19,737	49–20
70	March 21	Denver	W 124–91	LeBron James (33)	LeBron James (11)	LeBron James (11)	Quicken Loans Arena; 20,562	50–20
71	March 23	Milwaukee	W 113–104	LeBron James (26)	Kevin Love (10)	Irving, James (8)	Quicken Loans Arena; 20,562	51–20
72	March 24	@ Brooklyn	L 95–104	LeBron James (30)	Kevin Love (12)	LeBron James (5)	Barclays Center; 17,732	51–21
73	March 26	@ New York	W 107–93	Kevin Love (28)	Kevin Love (12)	LeBron James (10)	Madison Square Garden; 19,812	52–21
74	March 29	Houston	L 100–106	Kyrie Irving (31)	Kevin Love (11)	Kyrie Irving (8)	Quicken Loans Arena; 20,562	52–22
75	March 31	Brooklyn	W 107–87	LeBron James (24)	Kevin Love (10)	LeBron James (11)	Quicken Loans Arena; 20,562	53–22

April : 4–3 (home: 2–1; road: 2–2)

Game	Date	Team	Score	High points	High rebounds	High assists	Location Attendance	Record
76	April 1	@ Atlanta	W 110–108 (OT)	LeBron James (29)	LeBron James (16)	LeBron James (9)	Philips Arena; 19,427	54–22
77	April 3	Charlotte	W 112–103	LeBron James (31)	Kevin Love (9)	LeBron James (12)	Quicken Loans Arena; 20,562	55–22
78	April 5	@ Milwaukee	W 109–80	J. R. Smith (21)	Kevin Love (9)	LeBron James (9)	BMO Harris Bradley Center; 15,061	56–22
79	April 6	@ Indiana	L 109–123	Kyrie Irving (26)	Kevin Love (5)	Kyrie Irving (6)	Bankers Life Fieldhouse; 18,165	56–23
80	April 9	@ Chicago	L 102–105	LeBron James (33)	Kevin Love (13)	Kyrie Irving (8)	United Center; 22,186	56–24
81	April 11	Atlanta	W 109–94	Kyrie Irving (35)	Kevin Love (14)	LeBron James (6)	Quicken Loans Arena; 20,562	57–24
82	April 13	Detroit	L 110–112 (OT)	Jordan McRae (36)	Timofey Mozgov (12)	Jordan McRae (7)	Quicken Loans Arena; 20,562	57–25

2015–16 season schedule

== Playoffs ==
=== Game log ===
2016 playoff game log
Total: 16–5 (Home: 9–1; Road: 7–4)
First Round: 4–0 (home: 2–0; road: 2–0)

Game	Date	Team	Score	High points	High rebounds	High assists	Location Attendance	Series
1	April 17	Detroit	W 106–101	Kyrie Irving (31)	Kevin Love (13)	LeBron James (11)	Quicken Loans Arena; 20,562	1–0
2	April 20	Detroit	W 107–90	LeBron James (27)	Kevin Love (10)	Matthew Dellavedova (9)	Quicken Loans Arena; 20,562	2–0
3	April 22	@ Detroit	W 101–91	Kyrie Irving (26)	LeBron James (13)	LeBron James (7)	The Palace of Auburn Hills; 21,584	3–0
4	April 24	@ Detroit	W 100–98	Kyrie Irving (31)	Kevin Love (13)	LeBron James (6)	The Palace of Auburn Hills; 21,584	4–0

Conference Semifinals: 4–0 (home: 2–0; road: 2–0)

Game	Date	Team	Score	High points	High rebounds	High assists	Location Attendance	Series
1	May 2	Atlanta	W 104–93	LeBron James (25)	Tristan Thompson (14)	LeBron James (9)	Quicken Loans Arena; 20,562	1–0
2	May 4	Atlanta	W 123–98	LeBron James (27)	Kevin Love (13)	Dellavedova, Irving (6)	Quicken Loans Arena; 20,562	2–0
3	May 6	@ Atlanta	W 121–108	Channing Frye (27)	Kevin Love (15)	LeBron James (8)	Philips Arena; 19,089	3–0
4	May 8	@ Atlanta	W 100–99	Kevin Love (27)	Kevin Love (13)	LeBron James (9)	Philips Arena; 19,031	4–0

Conference Finals: 4–2 (home: 3–0; road: 1–2)

Game	Date	Team	Score	High points	High rebounds	High assists	Location Attendance	Series
1	May 17	Toronto	W 115–84	Kyrie Irving (27)	Richard Jefferson (11)	Kyrie Irving (5)	Quicken Loans Arena; 20,562	1–0
2	May 19	Toronto	W 108–89	Kyrie Irving (26)	Tristan Thompson (12)	LeBron James (11)	Quicken Loans Arena; 20,562	2–0
3	May 21	@ Toronto	L 84–99	LeBron James (24)	James, Thompson (8)	LeBron James (5)	Air Canada Centre; 20,207	2–1
4	May 23	@ Toronto	L 99–105	LeBron James (29)	James, Thompson (9)	Irving, James (6)	Air Canada Centre; 20,367	2–2
5	May 25	Toronto	W 116–78	Kevin Love (25)	Tristan Thompson (10)	LeBron James (8)	Quicken Loans Arena; 20,562	3–2
6	May 27	@ Toronto	W 113–87	LeBron James (33)	Kevin Love (12)	Kyrie Irving (9)	Air Canada Centre; 20,605	4–2

NBA Finals: 4–3 (home: 2–1; road: 2–2)

Game	Date	Team	Score	High points	High rebounds	High assists	Location Attendance	Series
1	June 2	@ Golden State	L 89–104	Kyrie Irving (26)	Kevin Love (13)	LeBron James (9)	Oracle Arena; 19,596	0–1
2	June 5	@ Golden State	L 77–110	LeBron James (19)	LeBron James (8)	LeBron James (9)	Oracle Arena; 19,596	0–2
3	June 8	Golden State	W 120–90	LeBron James (32)	Tristan Thompson (13)	Kyrie Irving (8)	Quicken Loans Arena; 20,562	1–2
4	June 10	Golden State	L 97–108	Kyrie Irving (34)	LeBron James (13)	LeBron James (9)	Quicken Loans Arena; 20,562	1–3
5	June 13	@ Golden State	W 112–97	James, Irving (41)	LeBron James (16)	LeBron James (7)	Oracle Arena; 19,596	2–3
6	June 16	Golden State	W 115–101	LeBron James (41)	Tristan Thompson (16)	LeBron James (11)	Quicken Loans Arena; 20,562	3–3
7	June 19	@ Golden State	W 93–89	LeBron James (27)	Kevin Love (14)	LeBron James (11)	Oracle Arena; 19,596	4–3

2016 playoff schedule

== Transactions ==
=== Trades ===
June 25, 2015	To Cleveland Cavaliers Rakeem Christmas; Cedi Osman; 2019 Second Round Pick	To Minnesota Timberwolves Tyus Jones
July 23, 2015	To Cleveland Cavaliers 2019 Second Round Pick	To Indiana Pacers Rakeem Christmas
July 27, 2015	To Cleveland Cavaliers Two Trade Exceptions	To Portland Trail Blazers Mike Miller; Brendan Haywood; 2019 & 2020 Second Round Pick
January 12, 2016	To Cleveland Cavaliers 2020 Second Round Pick	To Orlando Magic Joe Harris; 2017 Second Round Pick
February 18, 2016	To Cleveland Cavaliers Second Round Pick	To Portland Trail Blazers Anderson Varejão; First Round Pick
February 18, 2016	To Cleveland Cavaliers Channing Frye	To Orlando Magic Jared Cunningham; Second Round Pick

=== Re-signed ===
Player	Signed	Former Team
Iman Shumpert	Signed 4-year contract worth $40 million	Cleveland Cavaliers
Kevin Love	Signed 5-year contract worth $110 million	Cleveland Cavaliers
LeBron James	Signed 2-year contract worth $47.9 million	Cleveland Cavaliers
James Jones	Signed 1-year contract worth $1.5 million	Cleveland Cavaliers
Matthew Dellavedova	Signed 1-year contract worth $1.2 million	Cleveland Cavaliers
J. R. Smith	Signed 2-year contract worth $10 million	Cleveland Cavaliers
Tristan Thompson	Signed 5-year contract worth $82 million	Cleveland Cavaliers

==== Additions ====
Player	Signed	Former Team
Mo Williams	Signed 2-year contract worth $4 million	Charlotte Hornets
Richard Jefferson	Signed 1-year contract worth $1.5 million	Dallas Mavericks
Sasha Kaun	Signed 2-year contract	CSKA Moscow
Jordan McRae	Signed 2-year contract	Delaware 87ers / Phoenix Suns

==== Subtractions ====
Player	Reason Left	New Team
Shawn Marion	Retired	—N/a (Retired)
Kendrick Perkins	Signed 1-year contract worth $1.5 million	New Orleans Pelicans
David Blatt (Head coach)	Fired	Darüşşafaka Doğuş

== Awards, records and milestones ==
=== Awards ===
Recipient	Award	Date awarded	Ref.
LeBron James	Eastern Conference Player of the Week	November 23, 2015	
LeBron James	Eastern Conference Player of the Week	January 11, 2016	
LeBron James	NBA All-Star starter (12th appearance)	January 21, 2016	
Tyronn Lue	NBA All-Star Game head coach	January 27, 2016	
LeBron James	Eastern Conference Player of the Month (February)	March 3, 2016	
LeBron James	Eastern Conference Player of the Week	March 7, 2016	
LeBron James	Eastern Conference Player of the Week	March 28, 2016	
LeBron James	Eastern Conference Player of the Week	April 4, 2016	
LeBron James	Eastern Conference Player of the Month (March)	April 5, 2016	
LeBron James	Eastern Conference Player of the Month (April)	April 15, 2016	
LeBron James	All-NBA First Team	May 26, 2016	
LeBron James	NBA Finals Most Valuable Player Award	June 19, 2016	
LeBron James	Sports Illustrated Sportsperson of the Year	December 1, 2016	
LeBron James	Associated Press Male Athlete of the Year	December 27, 2016	

=== Records ===
- JR Smith set franchise records in:
  - Three-point field goals in a season: (204)
  - Three-point field goal attempts in a season: (510)
  - Turnover percentage in a season: (6.3%)
  - Three-point field goals in a postseason: (65)
- Tristan Thompson set a franchise record in:
  - Offensive rating in a season: (129.8)

=== Milestones ===
- On March 29, Tristan Thompson broke the franchise record of consecutive games with the Cavs, appearing in his 362nd consecutive game.
- The Cavs finished the season first in the Eastern Conference for the first time since 2010.
- The Cavs finished first in the Central Division for the second straight season.
- The Cavs became the first team in NBA history to come back from a 3–1 deficit and win the NBA Finals.
- The Cavs won the 2016 NBA Finals, ending the city's 52-year championship drought.
- LeBron James famously blocked Andre Iguodala in Game 7. This has been called one of the best plays of his career.
- LeBron James became the third player in NBA history to record a triple-double in Game 7 of the NBA Finals.
- James also became the first player in NBA history to lead both NBA Finals teams in all five statistical categories for the round.

== Notes ==
1. Varejão never played a single game for Portland.
