= Monty McCutchen =

American basketball referee

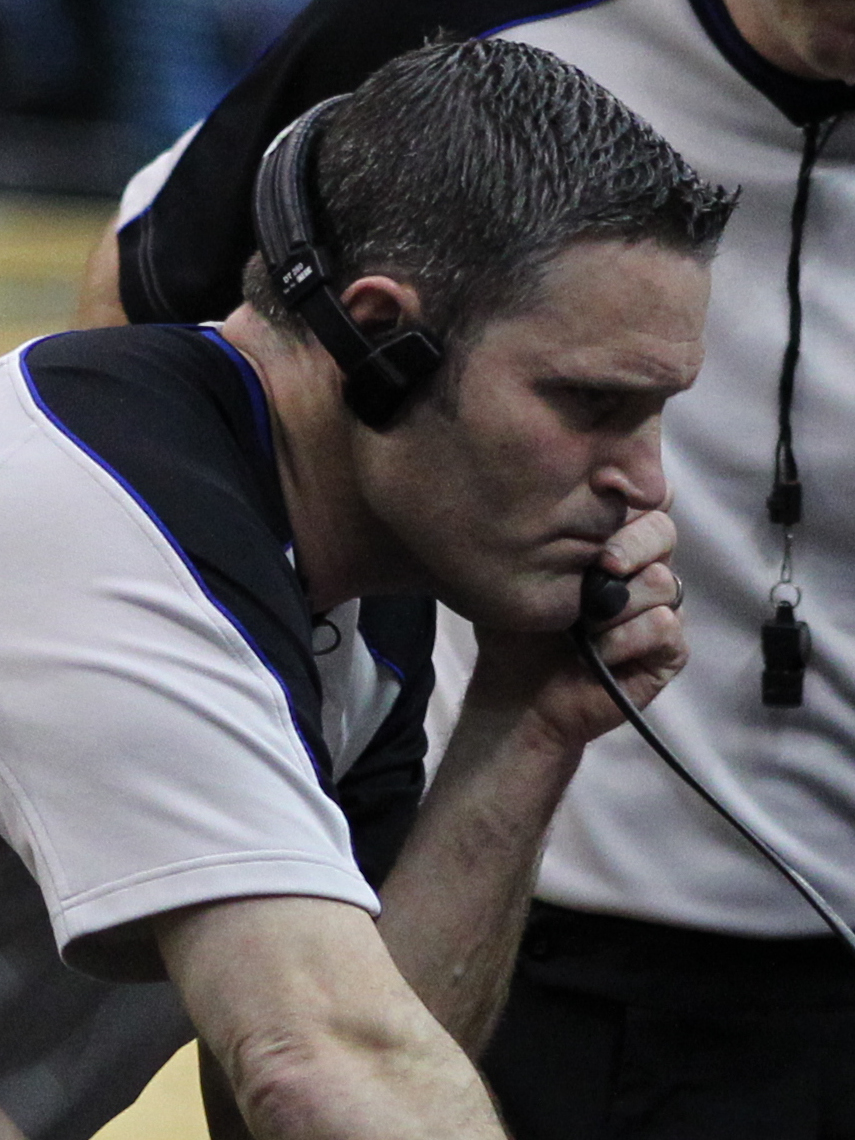
- McCutchen reviewing a play at the monitor in 2011
- Born: February 14, 1966 (age 60); San Angelo, Texas, U.S.
- Occupation: NBA referee

Monty McCutchen (born February 14, 1966) is a former professional basketball referee who has worked in the National Basketball Association (NBA) since the 1993–1994 season. He is now the league Senior Vice President of Referee Development and Training.

== NBA Finals Assignments ==
2017 Finals, Game 3 Golden State Warriors (118) @ Cleveland Cavaliers (113)

2016 Finals, Game 7 Cleveland Cavaliers (93) @ Golden State Warriors (89)

2016 Finals, Game 5 Cleveland Cavaliers (112) @ Golden State Warriors (97)

2016 Finals, Game 3 Golden State Warriors (90) @ Cleveland Cavaliers (120)

2015 Finals, Game 5: Cleveland Cavaliers (91) @ Golden State Warriors (104)

2015 Finals, Game 1: Cleveland Cavaliers (100) @ Golden State Warriors (108) (OT)

2014 Finals, Game 3: San Antonio Spurs (111) @ Miami Heat (92)

2013 Finals, Game 7: San Antonio Spurs (88) @ Miami Heat (95)

2013 Finals, Game 5: Miami Heat (104) @ San Antonio Spurs (114)

2013 Finals, Game 1: San Antonio Spurs (92) @ Miami Heat (88)

2012 Finals, Game 5: Oklahoma City Thunder (106) @ Miami Heat (121)

2012 Finals, Game 1: Miami Heat (94) @ Oklahoma City Thunder (105)

2011 Finals, Game 4: Miami Heat (83) @ Dallas Mavericks (86)

2010 Finals, Game 6: Boston Celtics (67) @ Los Angeles Lakers (89)

2010 Finals, Game 2: Boston Celtics (103) @ Los Angeles Lakers (94)

2009 Finals, Game 2: Orlando Magic (96) @ Los Angeles Lakers (101) (OT)

== Personal life ==
McCutchen is married with two children and resides near Asheville, North Carolina. In the offseason, he is an avid photographer who is also active in ranching. Before basketball, he was a substitute teacher at Thomas Edison middle school in south central Los Angeles. Currently working as the Head of Referee Training & Development at NBA.
