= Danny Crawford =

American basketball referee

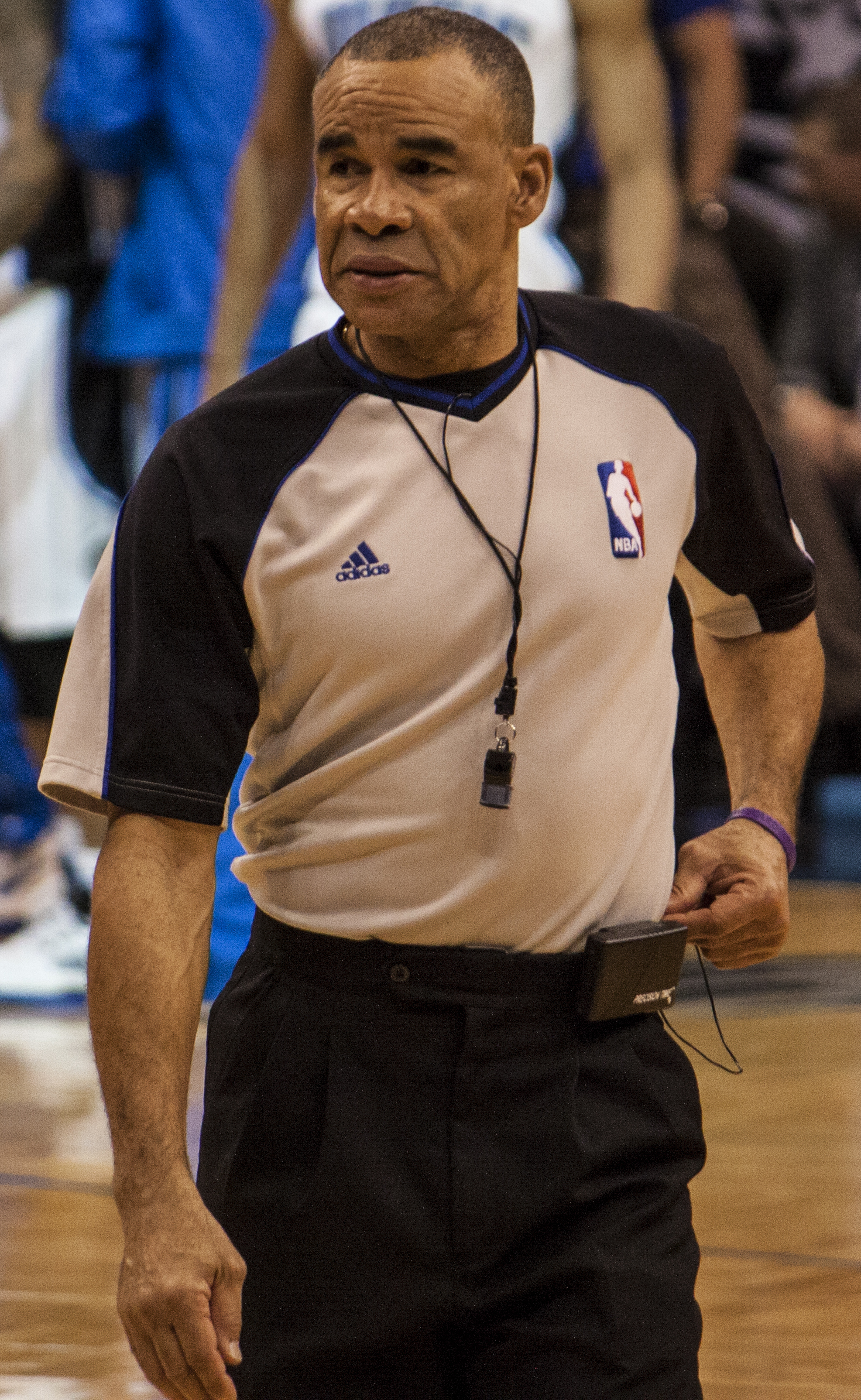
- Crawford in 2012
- Born: November 23, 1953 (age 72); Chicago, Illinois, U.S.
- Occupation: NBA Referee
- Spouse: Claudia
- Children: 2 including Drew

Danny Crawford (born November 23, 1953) is a retired American professional basketball referee in the National Basketball Association (NBA). He made 23 straight NBA Finals appearances, achieving this in Game 1 of the 2017 Finals. Crawford was an NBA referee from 1985 to 2017 and worked at least one NBA Finals game each season from 1995 to 2017. He was inducted into the Basketball Hall of Fame in 2025.

Crawford grew up in East Garfield Park on the West Side of Chicago. He attended Ryerson Elementary School and was a basketball star at the now defunct Cregier High School. In 1976, Crawford graduated from Northeastern Illinois University. As a guard, Crawford played hoops for NEIU, averaging 18 points as a sophomore. He majored in physical education, with hopes of becoming a gym teacher. Officiating was something he did on the side, for rec games and intramurals, to make a little extra cash while he was a student-teacher. He began to take it seriously in the late 1970s. He started with high schools, then junior college, and then Division 1 college basketball, where he officiated games in the Missouri Valley Conference. Crawford's first NBA game came in the 1984–85 season. In 2016, Crawford officiated his third NBA All-Star Game. In a 2016 survey conducted by the LA Times, NBA players voted on who they believed to be the best referee. Crawford received the most votes with 30. During an NBA game in 2013 Crawford was accidentally punched below the belt by Carlos Boozer.

Crawford's son, Drew, is a professional basketball player.

On August 2, 2017, Crawford retired.

In April 2025, it was announced that Crawford would be inducted into the Basketball Hall of Fame in the class of 2025.
