= History of the Cleveland Cavaliers =

The Cleveland Cavaliers first began play in the NBA in 1970 as an expansion team under the ownership of Nick Mileti. Jerry Tomko, the father of future Major League Baseball pitcher Brett Tomko, submitted the winning entry to name the team the "Cavaliers" through a competition sponsored by The Plain Dealer; supporters preferred it to "Jays", "Foresters" and "Presidents". Playing their home games at Cleveland Arena under the direction of head coach Bill Fitch, they compiled a league-worst 15–67 record in their inaugural season. The team hoped to build around the number one 1971 draft pick Austin Carr, who had set numerous scoring records at Notre Dame, but Carr severely injured his leg shortly into his pro career and never was able to realize his potential.

== 1970–1980: The Austin Carr era ==
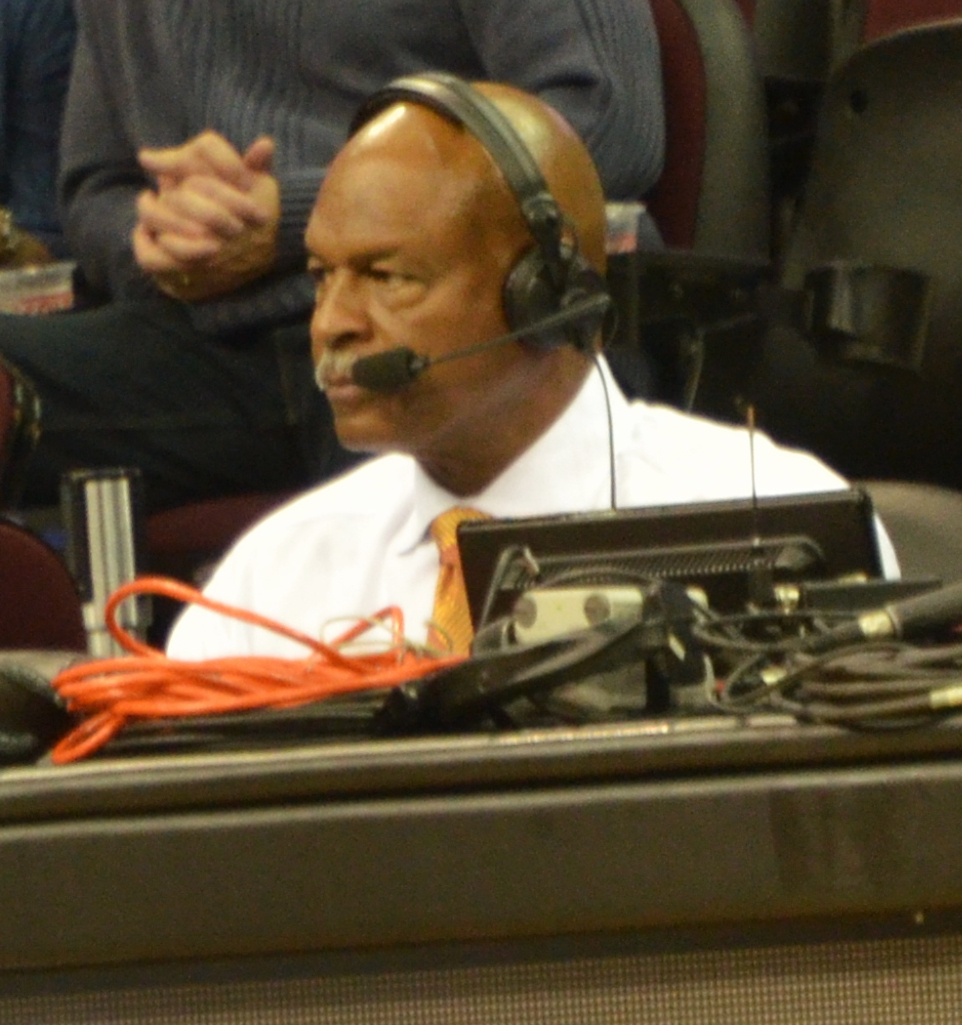
Austin Carr – the first overall pick in the 1971 NBA draft, a 1974 NBA All-Star, and longtime TV color analyst for the Cavaliers.

The following seasons saw the Cavaliers gradually improve their on-court performance, thanks to season-by-season additions of talented players such as Bobby "Bingo" Smith, Jim Chones, Jim Cleamons and Dick Snyder. The Cavaliers improved to 23–59 in their sophomore season, followed by a 32–50 record in 1972–73, and 29–53 in 1973–74.

In 1974, the Cavaliers moved into the brand-new Richfield Coliseum, located in rural Richfield, Ohio – 20 miles (32 km) south of downtown Cleveland in Summit County (now part of the Cuyahoga Valley National Park). The move was done as the Cleveland Arena had fallen into disrepair, and the location was chosen in an effort to draw fans in from nearby Akron and other areas of Northeast Ohio. That season, the Cavaliers finished with a 40–42 record, falling just short of a playoff berth.

=== "Miracle of Richfield" ===
In the 1975–76 season with Carr, Smith, Chones, Snyder, and newly acquired Nate Thurmond, Fitch led the Cavaliers to a 49–33 record and a division title. Fitch received the league's Coach of the Year award as the Cavaliers got their first winning season, made their first-ever playoff appearance, and clinched their first Central Division Title.

In the playoffs, the Cavaliers won their series against the Washington Bullets, 4–3. Because of the many heroics and last-second shots, the series became known locally as the "Miracle of Richfield." They won Game 7, 87–85, on a shot by Snyder with four seconds to go. But the team became hampered by injuries—particularly to Jim Chones, who suffered a broken ankle.

The Cavaliers proceeded to lose to the Boston Celtics in the Eastern Conference Finals. It is widely believed among both Cavaliers fans and players that the "Miracle" team would have won the 1976 NBA Championship had Chones stayed healthy.

Cleveland won 43 games in both of the 1976–77 and 1977–78 seasons, but both seasons resulted in early playoff exits. After a 30–52 season in 1978–79, Fitch resigned as head coach to take the same position with the Celtics, where he coached the Larry Bird-led squad to the NBA championship in 1981.

== 1980–1983: Ownership under Ted Stepien ==
The following season, after going 37–45 under Fitch's successor Stan Albeck, original owner Mileti sold his shares to Louis Mitchell who sold the shares to minority owner Joe Zingale. In 1980, after just a few months, Zingale sold the team to Nationwide Advertising magnate Ted Stepien on April 12, 1980. Early on in his tenure, Stepien proposed to rename the team the "Ohio Cavaliers", part of a plan that included playing their home games not just in the Cleveland area but in Cincinnati and in non-Ohio markets such as Buffalo and Pittsburgh. He also made changes to the game day entertainment, such as introducing a polka-flavored fight song and a dance team known as "The Teddy Bears". Stepien also oversaw the hiring and firing of a succession of coaches and was involved in making a number of poor trade and free agent signing decisions. The result of his questionable trading acumen was the loss of several of the team's first-round draft picks, which led to a rule change in the NBA prohibiting teams from trading away first-round draft picks in consecutive years. This rule is known as the "Ted Stepien Rule".

The ensuing chaos had a major effect on both the Cavaliers' on-court performance and lack of local support, going 28–54 in 1980–81 (Stepien's first year as owner), followed by an abysmal 15–67 mark in 1981–82. The 1981–82 team lost its last 19 games of the season which, when coupled with the five losses at the start of the 1982–83 season, constitute the NBA's second all-time longest losing streak at 24 games. Stepien's penchant for trading away first-round picks came back to haunt him, as the eventual champion Los Angeles Lakers received Cleveland's first overall pick in the 1982 NBA draft, allowing them to select future Hall of Famer James Worthy. The trade in question took place in 1980, when Cleveland sent Butch Lee and a 1982 first-round pick to the Lakers for Don Ford and a 1980 first-round pick.

Although the team improved its record to 23–59 the following year, local support for the Cavaliers eroded which eventually bottomed out that year by averaging only 3,900 fans a game at the cavernous (and isolated) Coliseum which seated more than 20,000.

Though Stepien eventually threatened to move the franchise to Toronto and rename it the Toronto Towers - to the point that he had a Toronto Towers logo created - brothers George and Gordon Gund purchased the Cavaliers in 1983 and decided to keep the team in Cleveland (it would be another 12 years before Toronto finally got an NBA team in the form of the Raptors via expansion). As an incentive to the Gunds, NBA owners awarded the team bonus first-round picks for each year from 1983 to 1986 to help compensate for the ones Stepien traded away.

== 1983–1986: The Gunds take over ==
Shortly after purchasing the Cavaliers in 1983, the Gunds (George and Gordon) changed the team colors from wine and gold to burnt orange and navy blue. Furthermore, they officially adopted "Cavs" as a shorter nickname for marketing purposes, as it had been used unofficially by fans and headline writers since the team's inception.

Under the coaching of George Karl, the Cavs failed again, and missed the playoffs, with a 28–54 record, in the 1983–84 season. The Cavs finally returned to the playoffs in 1985, only to lose to the eventual Eastern Conference Champion Boston Celtics in the first round. At that point, the team was in transition, led by dynamic players such as World B. Free, Roy Hinson and John Bagley. But in 1986, Karl was fired after 66 games. Interim head coach Gene Littles guided the team the rest of the way, which saw the Cavs finish one game short of the playoffs. During the seven-season period, the Cavs had nine head coaches: Stan Albeck, Bill Musselman, Don Delaney, Bob Kloppenburg, Chuck Daly, Bill Musselman (again), Tom Nissalke, George Karl, and Gene Littles. The only playoff appearance earned during this stretch was during the 1984–85 season under Karl, losing to the Boston Celtics in the first round in four games (1–3).

== 1986–1995: The Daugherty/Nance/Price era ==
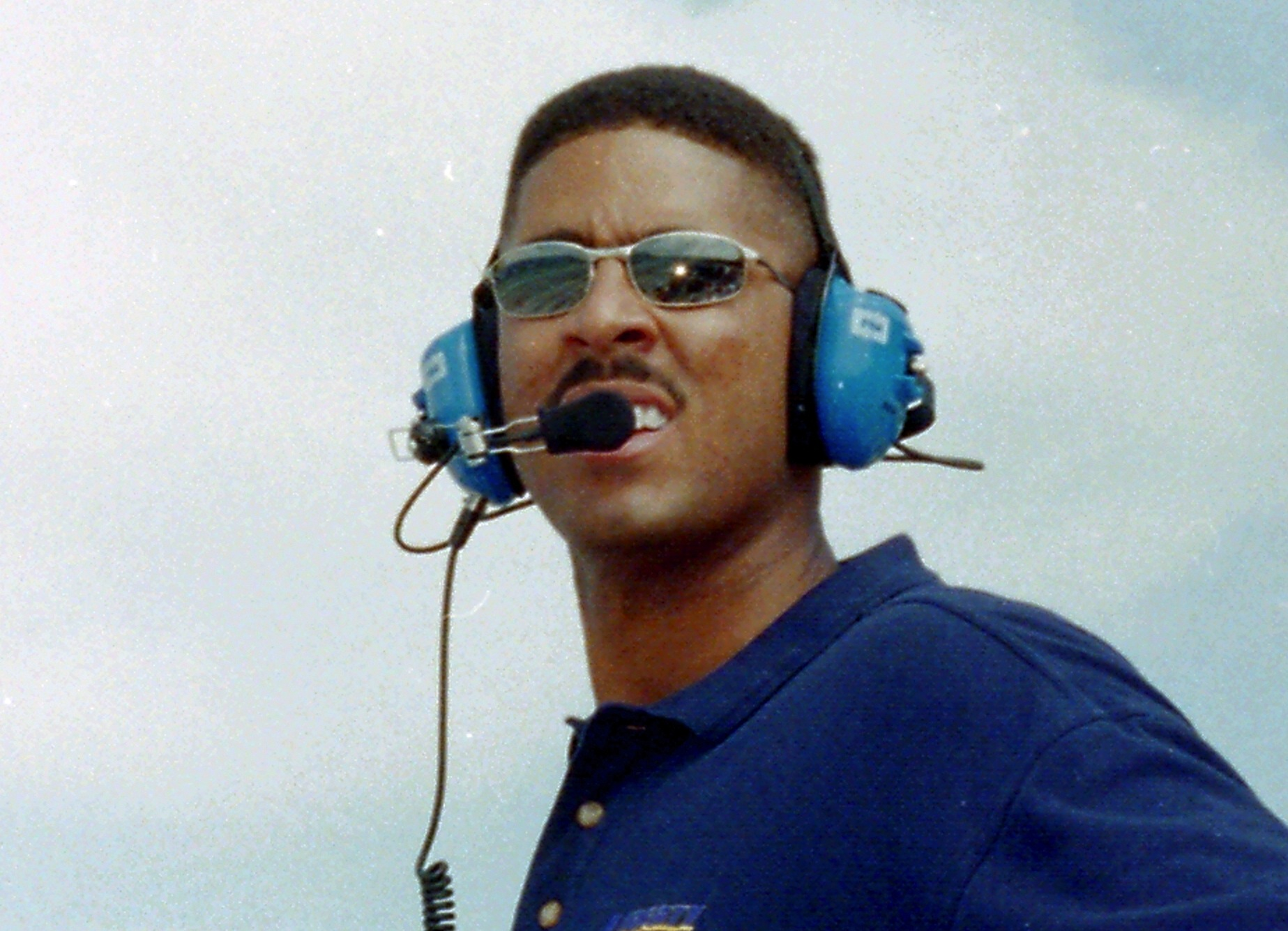
Brad Daugherty – the first overall pick in the 1986 NBA draft and a five-time NBA All-Star for the Cavs

During the 1986 NBA draft, the Cavs acquired Brad Daugherty, Mark Price, and Ron Harper. They would also add Larry Nance just before the 1988 trade deadline, in a deal with the Phoenix Suns. Those four players (until Harper was later traded to the Los Angeles Clippers in 1989 for the rights to Danny Ferry) formed the core of the team, under the direction of head coach Lenny Wilkens, that led the Cavs to eight playoff seasons in the next nine years, including three seasons of 50 or more wins.

In 1989, the Cavs were paired against the Michael Jordan-led Chicago Bulls in the first round of the playoffs. In the fourth game of the best-of-five-series, Cleveland managed to beat the Bulls in overtime 108–105 to level the series at 2–2. Home court advantage went to Cleveland. The game was evenly matched, until Cleveland managed to score on a drive and raise the lead by one, with three seconds left. Chicago called for a time-out. The ball was inbounded to Michael Jordan, who went for a jump shot. Cleveland's Craig Ehlo jumped in front to block it, but Jordan seemed to stay in the air until Ehlo landed. "The Shot" went in as time ran out, with Chicago winning the series 3–2. The pinnacle of the Cavs' success came in the 1991–92 season, when they compiled a 57–25 record and advanced to the Eastern Conference Finals, losing again to the Chicago Bulls, 4–2. Soon after, the Cavs entered into a period of decline. With the retirements and departures of Nance, Daugherty, and Price, the team lost much of its dominance and were no longer able to contest strongly during the playoffs. After the 1992–93 season, in which the Cavs had a 54–28 regular-season record but suffered an early exit from the playoffs in the Eastern Conference Semi-Finals to the Chicago Bulls, Wilkens left to coach the Atlanta Hawks.

Following the hiring of Mike Fratello as head coach starting with the 1993–94 season, the Cavs became one of the NBA's best defensive teams under the leadership of point guard Terrell Brandon. But the offense, which was a half-court, "slow-down" tempo installed by Fratello, met with mixed success. Although the Cavaliers made regular playoff appearances, they were unable to advance beyond the first round. In the 1994 NBA Playoffs, the last which Daugherty and Nance played in, the Cavs yet again met the Chicago Bulls in the first round, led by Scottie Pippen in the wake of Jordan's first retirement. The Bulls proved that it was not just the "Jordan Curse", and would prevail yet again by sweeping the Cavs 3–0 in the first-round encounter.

In 1994, the Cavs moved back to downtown Cleveland with the opening of the 20,562-seat Gund Arena. Known by locals as "the Gund", the venue served as the site of the 1997 NBA All-Star Game. The arena and the Cleveland Indians' Jacobs Field were built together as part of the city's Gateway Sports and Entertainment Complex

== 1995–2003: Near decade of struggles ==
=== Mike Fratello years ===
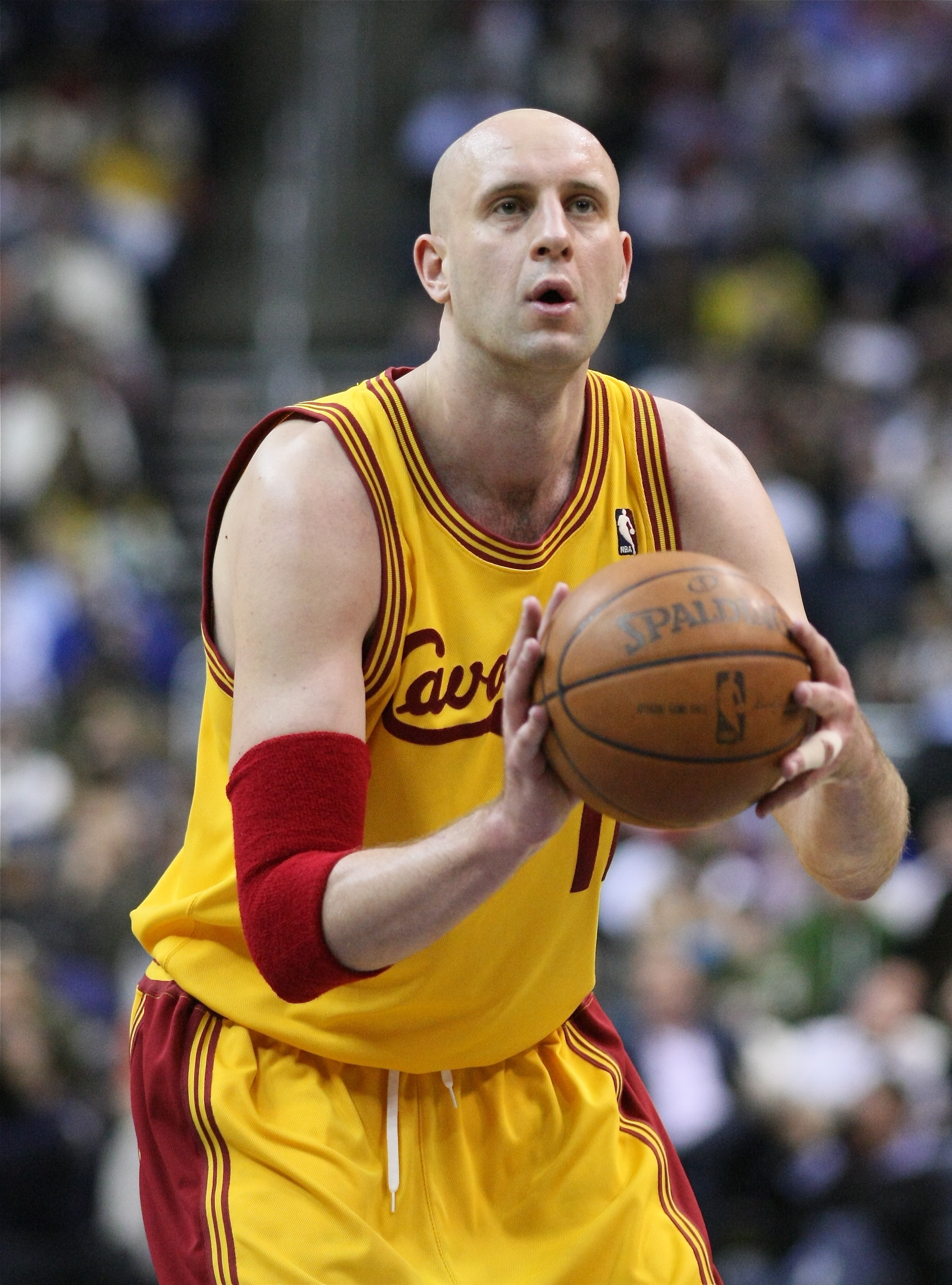
Žydrūnas Ilgauskas – a Cavs 1996 first-round draft pick, a two-time NBA All Star for the Cavs. He is the team's all-time leader in blocked shots and second in games played, minutes played, points and rebounds.

Due to serious back injuries, Brad Daugherty was forced to retire in 1996 after sitting out the 1994–95 season. Larry Nance had also retired following the 1993–94 season, and Mark Price was traded to the Washington Bullets after the 1994–95 season. The Cavs under Brandon would lose to the New York Knicks in the first round of both the 1995 and 1996 playoffs. Then on April 20, 1997, the Cavs lost a virtual winner-take-all game to the Bullets on the final day of the regular season, denying them a playoff berth.

The Cavs revamped their starting lineup during the 1997 off-season, sending guard Bobby Phills, and forward Chris Mills to free agency, and trading Terrell Brandon and Tyrone Hill to the Milwaukee Bucks as part of a three-team trade. They acquired All-Star forward Shawn Kemp from the Seattle SuperSonics (from the three-team trade involving Cleveland, Seattle and Milwaukee) and guard Wesley Person from the Phoenix Suns. Later on, players like Kemp and Žydrūnas Ilgauskas added quality to the team, but without further post-season success. The Cavs did have five All-Stars/All-Rookies in 1998 with Kemp a starting All-Star for the East, Brevin Knight and Ilgauskas on the All-Rookie First Team, and Cedric Henderson and Derek Anderson on the All-Rookie Second Team. No other NBA team has ever been represented by five players at the All-Star celebration or four players as All-Rookies in the same year. Still, in the three seasons that Kemp played for the Cavs, they managed only one playoff appearance and one playoff win. Fratello was fired following the shortened 1998–99 season.

=== Early 2000s struggles ===
Despite the arrivals of Andre Miller, Brevin Knight, Lamond Murray, Chris Mihm and Carlos Boozer, the Cavs were a perennial lottery team for the early part of the 2000s. The 2002–03 team finished with the third-worst record in franchise history (17–65), which earned them a tie for last place in the league and a 22.5% chance at winning the NBA Draft Lottery and the first overall selection.

Ricky Davis received national attention on March 16, 2003, in game against the Utah Jazz. With Cleveland ahead in the game 120–95, Davis was one rebound short of a triple-double with only a few seconds left on the clock. After receiving an inbound pass at the Cavs' end of the floor, Davis banged the ball off the rim and caught it in attempt to receive credit for a rebound. Utah's DeShawn Stevenson took offense to this breach of sportsman's etiquette and immediately fouled Davis hard. The play did not count as a rebound since firing at one's own team's basket does not count as a shot attempt, and doing so intentionally is a technical foul under NBA rules. Since the referees had never seen anyone shoot at his own basket before, they were unfamiliar with the rule and play was allowed to continue. This (which led to Davis being nicknamed in Cleveland as "Wrong Rim Ricky") and countless other acts contributed to the Cavs' trading of Davis later that year and ushering in a new type of team.

== 2003–2010: First LeBron era ==
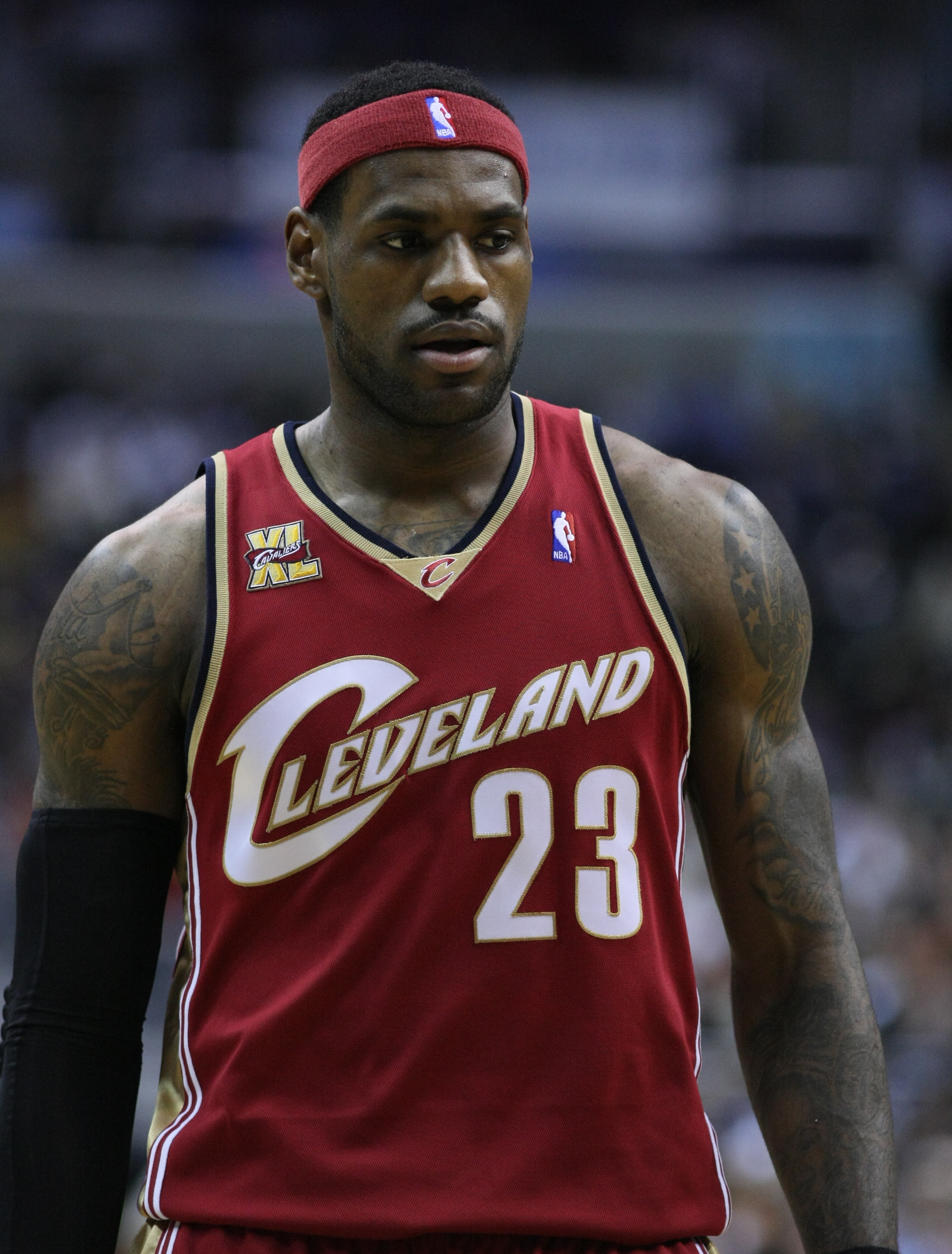
Cavaliers forward LeBron James, who was the first overall pick of the 2003 NBA draft. In his first stint with the Cavaliers, he was the 2004 Rookie of the Year, a two-time NBA MVP (2009, 2010), a six-time NBA All Star, led the team to its first NBA Finals in 2007, and became the team's all-time leading scorer.

Several losing seasons followed which saw the Cavs drop to the bottom of the league and become a perennial lottery draft team. After another disappointing season in 2002–03, the Cavaliers landed the number one draft pick in the NBA draft lottery. With it, the team selected local high school phenomenon and future NBA MVP LeBron James. As if celebrating a new era in Cleveland Cavaliers basketball, the team's name went from the Cavs back to the Cavaliers and the colors were changed from orange, black and blue back to wine and gold, with the addition of navy blue and a new primary logo.

James' status as both an area star (having played his high school basketball at St. Vincent–St. Mary High School in nearby Akron) and as one of the most highly touted prospects in NBA history has led many to view his selection as a turning point in the franchise's history. Embraced by Cleveland as "King James", the 2003–04 season offered great hope for the future, as James rose to become a dominating player, winning the NBA Rookie of the Year Award. Hope was even greater for the 2004–05 season. James increased his production in terms of points, rebounds, and assists per game. Despite the loss of Carlos Boozer in the offseason, James teamed with Žydrūnas Ilgauskas and Drew Gooden to form the core of the team. After a promising start, the Cavaliers began a downward spiral that eventually led to the firing of coach Paul Silas and general manager Jim Paxson. The team failed to make the playoffs that year, tied with New Jersey Nets for the final playoff spot with identical 42–40 records; however, the Nets owned the tiebreaker due to having the better head-to-head record.

=== Dan Gilbert takes over ===
The Cavaliers made many changes in the 2005 offseason. Under new owner Dan Gilbert, the team hired a new head coach, Mike Brown, and a new general manager, former Cavaliers forward Danny Ferry. The team experienced success on the court in the following season, clinching their first playoff appearance since 1998. After a first round win over the Washington Wizards, the Cavaliers rebounded from a 0–2 deficit in the second round against the #1 seeded Detroit Pistons, winning three consecutive games to come one game away from the Conference Finals. They lost a close Game 6 at home, and followed it with a 79–61 loss in Game 7. The playoff rounds were a showcase for the emergence of James, who achieved many "youngest ever to..." records during the run.

=== 2006–2007: Eastern Conference champions and NBA Finals appearance ===
The Cavaliers continued their success in the 2006–07 season. The team earned the second seed in the East with a 50–32 record, generating a series of favorable matchups in the playoffs. They battled 7th-seeded Wizards, who struggled with injuries near the end of the season. The Cavaliers swept this series 4–0, and defeated the New Jersey Nets, 4–2, in the second round. The Cavaliers faced the Pistons in the Eastern Conference Finals. After again losing the first two games at Detroit, the Cavaliers won the next three to take a 3–2 series lead. This time, the Cavaliers eliminated Detroit in Game 6. The wins included a 109–107 double-overtime game at The Palace of Auburn Hills in Game 5, in which LeBron James scored the last 25 points for the Cavaliers, and his performance in this game is recognized as one of the best in NBA history. They continued to a dominant 98–82 win at home in Game 6. Rookie Daniel "Boobie" Gibson scored a career-high 31 points in the series clincher, and the franchise won its first ever Eastern Conference Championship. The team's first trip to the NBA Finals was a short one, as they were outmatched and outplayed by the deeper, more experienced San Antonio Spurs, who swept the Cavaliers 4–0.

The Cavaliers took a step back in the 2007–08 season. They battled injuries and had many roster changes, including a three team trade at the trade deadline in which the team acquired F Joe Smith, G-F Wally Szczerbiak, F-C Ben Wallace, and G Delonte West. The Cavaliers finished 45–37 and lost in the second round against eventual champion Boston in seven games. The next off-season, the team made a major change to its lineup, trading G Damon Jones and Smith (who later in the season rejoined the Cavaliers after being released by Oklahoma City) for point guard Mo Williams. This trade was made in hopes of bringing another scorer to aid James.

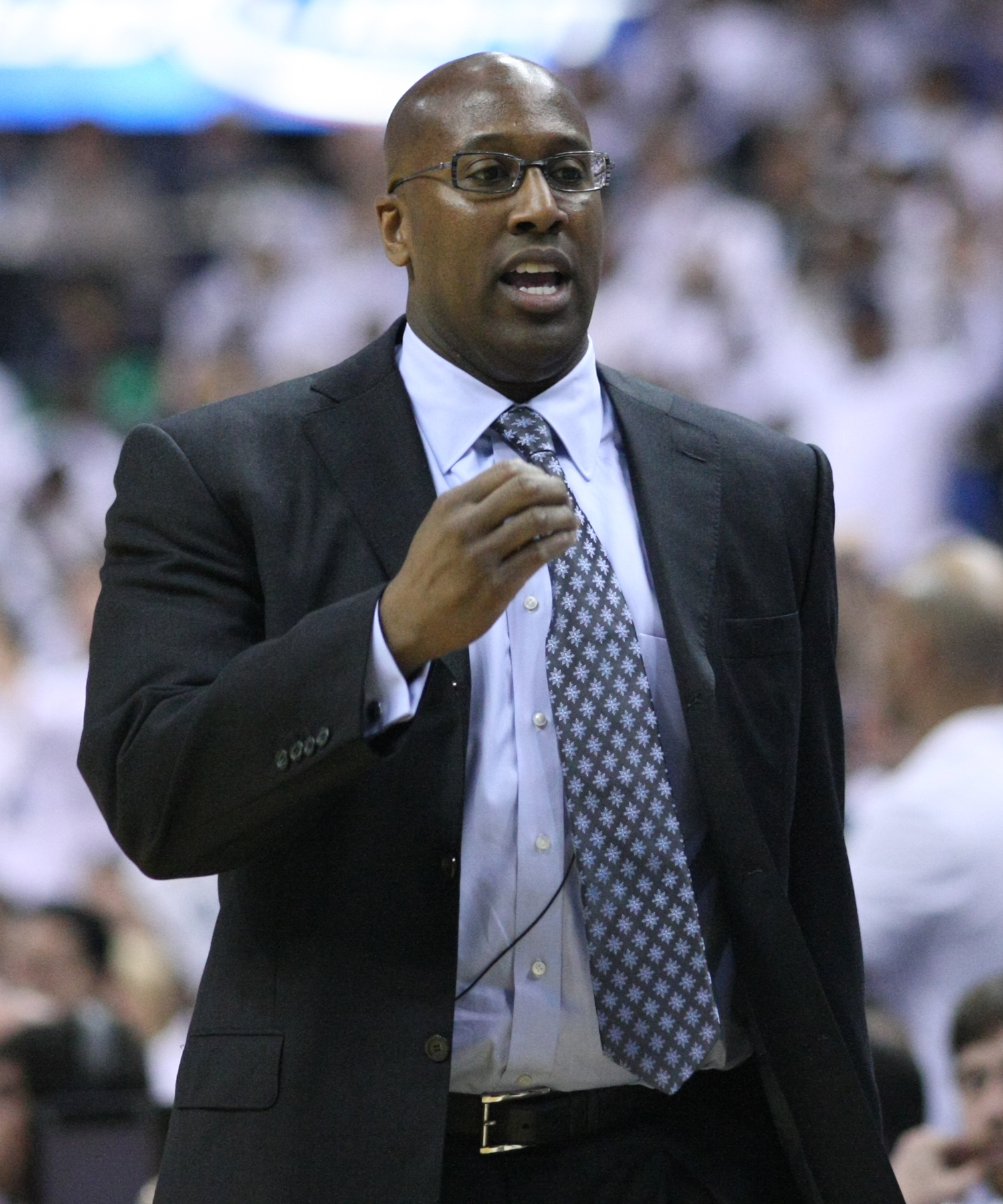
Two-time head coach Mike Brown, who in his first stint with the Cavaliers was NBA Coach of the Year for 2008–09, led the team to the 2007 NBA Finals, and was the head coach of the Eastern Conference for the 2009 All Star Game.

=== 2008–2010: Playoff upsets ===
In the next season, the Cavaliers made progress. They finished with a record of 66–16, the best regular-season record in franchise history. The year marked other notable franchise records, including a 13-game winning streak, and road and home winning records. The Cavaliers entered the playoffs as the #1 seed in the NBA with home court advantage throughout the playoffs. They finished the season 39–2 at home, one win short of the best all-time home record. Head coach Mike Brown won NBA Coach of the Year honors and LeBron James finished second in NBA Defensive Player of the Year Award voting and won the NBA Most Valuable Player award. The Cavaliers began the 2009 postseason by sweeping the 8th-seeded Detroit Pistons, winning every game by ten or more points. In the conference semifinals, the Cavaliers swept the 4th-seeded Atlanta Hawks, again winning each game by at least ten points, becoming the first team in NBA history to win eight straight playoff games by a double-digit margin. The Cavaliers then met the Orlando Magic in the Eastern Conference Finals. The Cavaliers lost Game 1 of the series 107–106 at home despite James' 49-point effort. Despite winning Game 2 by a score of 96–95, with the help of a James buzzer-beating three-pointer, it was not enough as Orlando won the series in six games, nixing a LeBron vs. Kobe NBA Finals matchup.

During the 2009 off-season, the Cavaliers acquired four-time NBA champion and 15-time All Star center Shaquille O'Neal from the Phoenix Suns. The Cavaliers also signed wingman Anthony Parker, and forwards Leon Powe and Jamario Moon for the following season. On February 17, 2010, the Cavaliers acquired All-Star forward Antawn Jamison from the Washington Wizards and Sebastian Telfair from the Los Angeles Clippers in a three team trade. The Cavaliers originally lost Žydrūnas Ilgauskas in this trade, but after being waived by Washington, he signed back with the Cavaliers on March 23 for the rest of the season. The Cavaliers managed to finish with the NBA's best record for the second straight season, with a 61–21 record. James was named the NBA MVP for the second consecutive year. The Cavaliers defeated the Chicago Bulls 4–1 in the first round of the 2010 NBA playoffs, but lost to the Boston Celtics in the semifinals after leading the series 2–1, with the Celtics proceeding to win 3 consecutive games (afterwards, the Celtics went to the 2010 NBA Finals and lost to the Los Angeles Lakers 4–3.) Each team would suffer record-setting playoff defeats on home soil; the Celtics lost by 29, 124–95, in Game 3, the greatest defeat in the history of the Boston Celtics in the playoffs, while the Cavaliers lost by 32, 120–88, in Game 5.

== 2010–2014: Cavaliers without LeBron ==
=== The Decision ===
With the Cavaliers out of the playoffs, the focus turned to James' impending free agency. On July 8, 2010, James announced in a nationally televised one-hour special titled The Decision on ESPN that he would be signing with the Miami Heat. The repercussions of this announcement left many in the city of Cleveland infuriated and feeling betrayed. A number of LeBron James jerseys were burned, and the famous Nike "Witness" mural of James in downtown Cleveland was immediately taken down.

Shortly after James made his announcement, Dan Gilbert, the owner of the Cavaliers, announced in an open letter on the Cavaliers website that James' decision was a "cowardly betrayal" and promised an NBA Championship for the Cleveland Cavaliers before James won one, although James would win a championship before the Cavaliers with the Miami Heat in 2012.

=== 2010–2011: Struggles and infamy ===
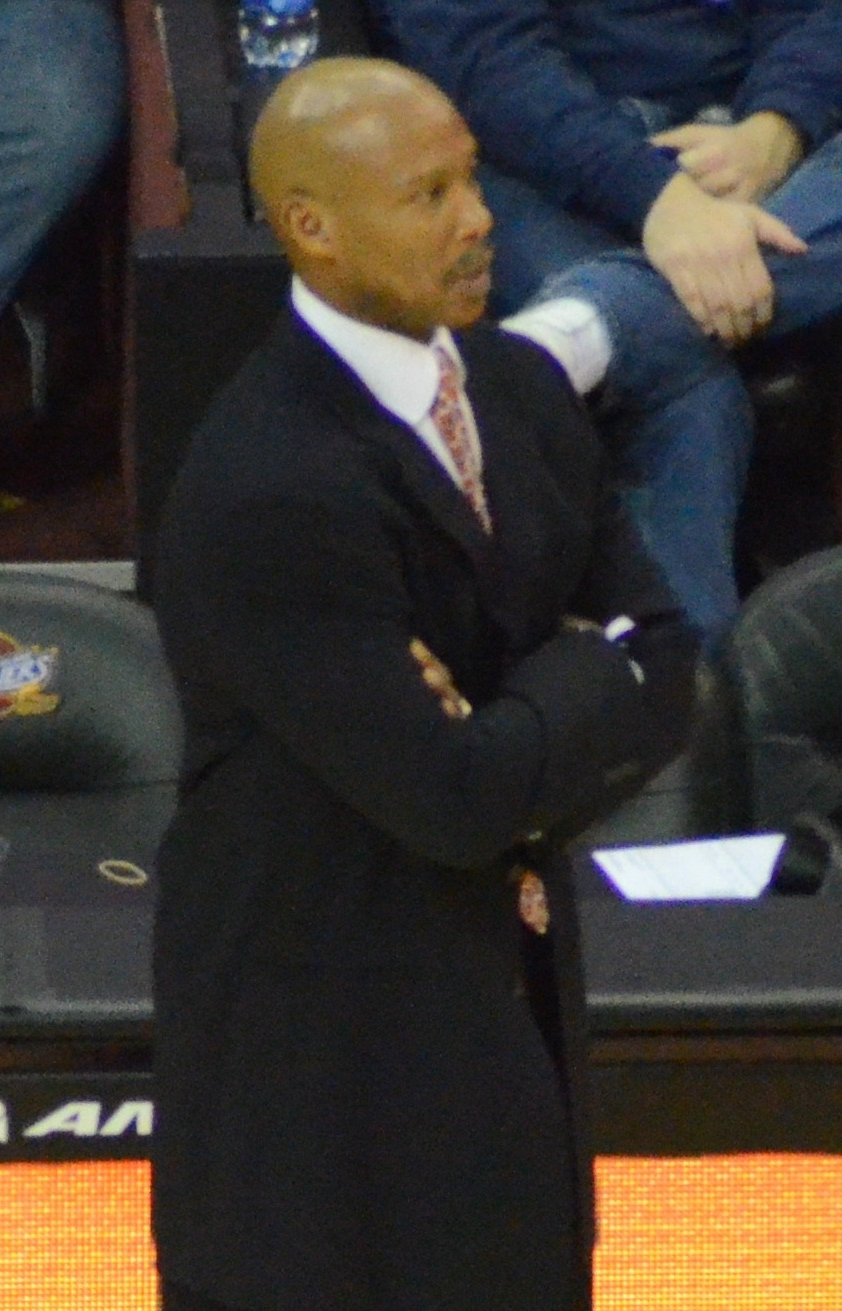
Former Cavaliers head coach Byron Scott, under whose watch the team went 64-166 and went through the (then) longest losing streak in major professional sports history at 26

During the 2010 off-season, before LeBron James left the team, the Cavaliers fired head coach Mike Brown, along with most of their coaching staff. General Manager Danny Ferry resigned on June 4, 2010, and Assistant General Manager Chris Grant was promoted to replace Ferry. On July 1, the Cavaliers hired former Los Angeles Lakers guard and former New Jersey Nets and New Orleans Hornets head coach Byron Scott as the 18th head coach in franchise history.

The Cavaliers spent the rest of the 2010 off-season rebuilding their team after James' departure. They signed 2009 first-round pick Christian Eyenga and acquired Ramon Sessions and Ryan Hollins from the Minnesota Timberwolves in a trade that saw the Cavaliers give away Delonte West and Sebastian Telfair. The Cavaliers also signed free agent Joey Graham and undrafted rookies Samardo Samuels and Manny Harris. The Cavaliers were also active at the trade deadline in February 2011. They acquired former All-Star Baron Davis and a 2011 first round draft pick from the L.A. Clippers in exchange for Mo Williams and Jamario Moon.

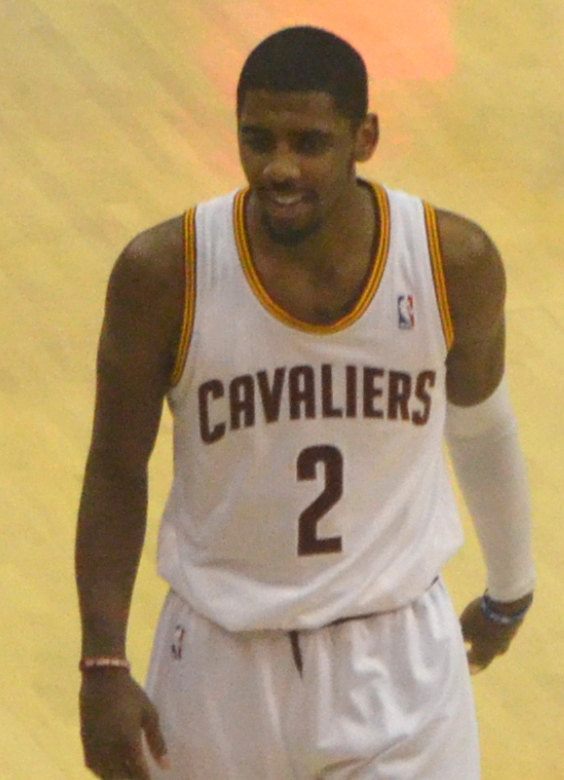
Kyrie Irving – the first overall pick in the 2011 NBA draft, the 2011–12 Rookie of the Year, a three-time NBA All Star, the 2014 All Star Game MVP, and was the 2014 FIBA Basketball World Cup MVP after helping lead Team USA to the Gold Medal.

On the court, the 2010–11 season was a stark contrast from the previous season. They went from a league-best 61 wins in 2009–10 to a conference-worst 19, the biggest single-season drop in NBA history. This season also saw the Cavaliers lose 63 games, including a 26-game losing streak, which set an NBA record and tied the expansion 1976–77 Tampa Bay Buccaneers for the longest losing streak in any American professional team sport.

=== 2011–2014: Kyrie Irving takes over ===
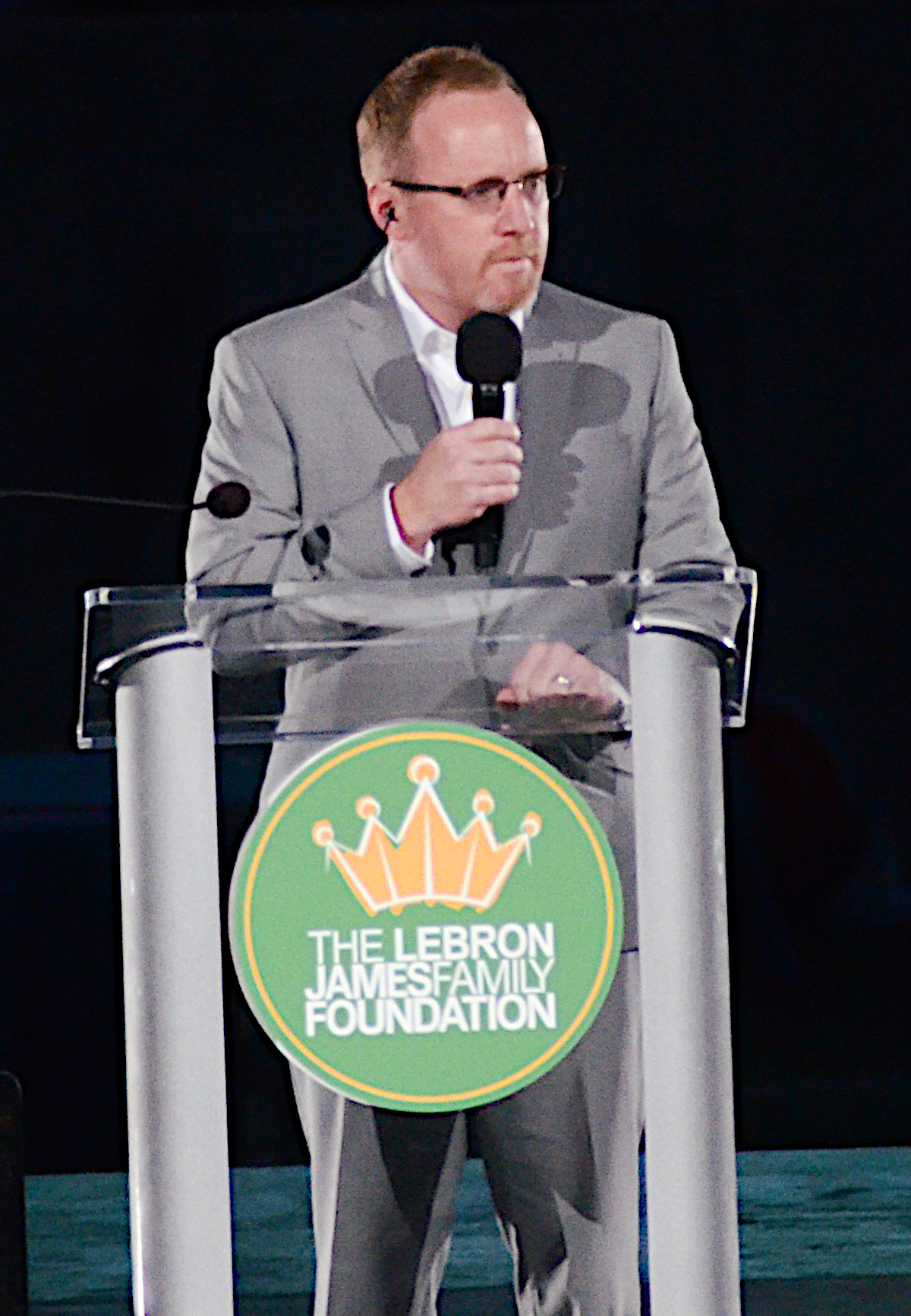
David Griffin, who became Cavaliers GM in February 2014

Having the second-worst team record in the 2010–11 season as well as the Clippers' first-round pick that they received in the Mo Williams–Baron Davis trade, the Cavaliers had high odds of winning an early draft pick in the NBA draft lottery, with a 22.7% chance of their pick becoming number 1 overall. The selection acquired from the Clippers became the first pick in the lottery, while the Cavaliers original selection ended up as the #4 selection in the draft. The Cavaliers took Duke Blue Devils guard Kyrie Irving with the first pick. With the 4th pick, the Cavaliers selected Texas Longhorns power forward Tristan Thompson. The Cavaliers used the next year to build around the two top-5 picks. They acquired small forward Omri Casspi and a lottery-protected first-round draft pick from the Sacramento Kings for forward J. J. Hickson.

At the next year's trade deadline, the Cavaliers acquired forward Luke Walton and a first-round draft pick from the Los Angeles Lakers. The 2011–12 lockout shortened season was an improvement for the Cavaliers, as they finished 21–45. Irving was named NBA Rookie of the Year and was unanimously voted to the NBA All-Rookie First Team. Thompson was named to the NBA All-Rookie Second Team.

For the second straight year, the Cavaliers had two first-round picks in the NBA draft. With their own #4 pick, they chose guard Dion Waiters from Syracuse, and with pick #17 (which was acquired from Dallas on draft night), they chose center Tyler Zeller from North Carolina. In August 2012, the Cavaliers signed veteran free agent swingman C. J. Miles. The team struggled in 2012–13, which led to them sacking head coach Byron Scott after a 64–166 record in three seasons. The following week, the Cavaliers rehired Mike Brown as head coach, making him the second two-time head coach in team history, after Bill Musselman in the early 1980s.

The Cavaliers had several early picks in 2013. They won the 2013 NBA draft lottery to receive the first overall pick. They also had the 19th pick (acquired from the Los Angeles Lakers), as well as two out of the top three picks in the second round. For the third straight year, the Cavaliers had two picks in the first round of the NBA draft. The Cavaliers made somewhat of a surprise pick when they drafted forward Anthony Bennett of UNLV. This made Bennett the first Canadian born player in history to be the number one pick. With the 19th pick, the Cavaliers selected swingman Sergey Karasev out of Russia. The Cavaliers signed free agent forward Earl Clark to a two-year contract and veteran guard Jarrett Jack to a four-year deal. The Cavaliers also signed two-time NBA Champion and former All-Star center Andrew Bynum to a one-year contract. Bynum was then traded on January 7, 2014, to the Chicago Bulls (along with draft picks) for two-time All-Star forward Luol Deng.

The Cavaliers on February 6 fired GM Chris Grant. The team then announced that VP of basketball operations David Griffin would serve as acting GM. On May 12, 2014, the Cavaliers announced that Griffin had been named as the full-time GM, while also announcing that Mike Brown had been fired after one season in his second stint with the team following going 33–49. The Cavaliers won the #1 draft pick in the 2014 Draft Lottery, making it the third time in four years they would win the lottery.

== 2014–2018: The return of LeBron James ==
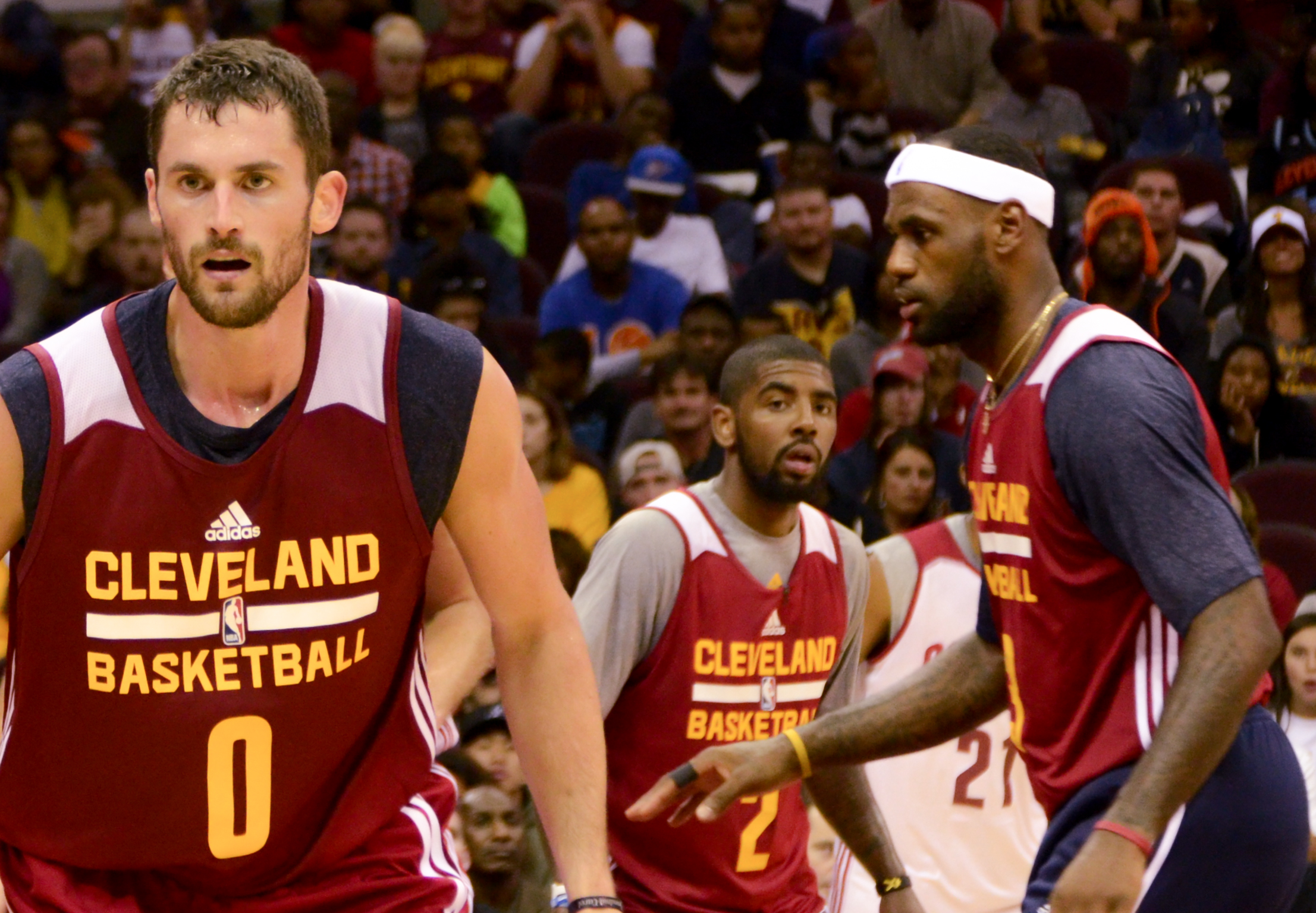
Kevin Love (left), Kyrie Irving (center) and LeBron James (right) united in 2014 to form a "Big Three" in Cleveland. The trio led the Cavs to three Eastern Conference Championships (2015–2017) and the 2016 NBA Championship.

The Cavaliers were perennial title contenders between 2014–15 and 2017-18 following the return of LeBron James to Cleveland. On July 11, 2014, James revealed via a first-person essay in Sports Illustrated that he intended to return to the Cavaliers. In contrast to The Decision, his announcement to return to Cleveland was well received. A day later, he officially signed with the team, who had compiled a league-worst 97–215 record in the four seasons following his departure. A month after James' signing, the Cavaliers acquired Kevin Love from the Minnesota Timberwolves, forming a new star trio along with Kyrie Irving.

=== 2014–2015: Second NBA Finals appearance ===
The Cavaliers struggled over the first two months of the 2014–15 season. They were 19–16 on January 5, and fifth in the Eastern Conference. David Blatt's coaching job was in peril and the Irving/James/Love "Big 3" wasn't clicking. That was the day general manager David Griffin saved the season with two moves. First, Dion Waiters was sent to the Oklahoma City Thunder in a three-team deal that landed J. R. Smith and Iman Shumpert. Then two days later, Griffin gave up two first-round picks for Denver Nuggets center Timofey Mozgov. The Cavaliers bottomed out at 19–20 on January 13 but were 32–9 the rest of the way. Irving proved to be a worthy partner for James during the 2014–15 season, as he ascended to James' level with a 55-point effort on January 28 against Portland and a 57-point effort on March 12 against San Antonio, which broke the franchise scoring record of 56 held by James.

The Cavaliers entered the 2015 NBA playoffs as the second seed in the East with a 53–29 record. They advanced through the first three rounds of the playoffs virtually unchallenged, sweeping Boston in the first round, defeating Chicago in six games in the second round, and sweeping Atlanta in the Conference Finals to claim the franchise's second ever Eastern Conference championship and a trip to the NBA Finals. Games 1 and 2 of the NBA Finals saw a pair of overtime games, in which Game 1 went to the favored Golden State Warriors and Game 2 went to the Cavaliers. The Cavaliers went on to win Game 3 to take a 2–1 lead in the series, with James taking on the bulk of offensive responsibilities – through three games, James played 142 of 154 possible minutes, scored 123 points and took 107 shots. Despite taking the lead however, the Cavaliers went on to lose the next three games, as the Warriors took out the 2015 NBA Championship on Cleveland's home court in Game 6. The Cavaliers struggled without Love, who suffered a shoulder injury in the first round, and Irving, who fractured his kneecap in overtime of the first game of the Finals. To make matters worse, Smith and Shumpert had poor Finals campaigns, which led to players such as Matthew Dellavedova and James Jones playing roles that were beyond their capabilities. Despite the loss, James received serious consideration for Finals MVP after averaging 35.8 points, 13.3 rebounds and 8.8 assists over the six games.

=== 2015–2016: Ending Cleveland's drought ===
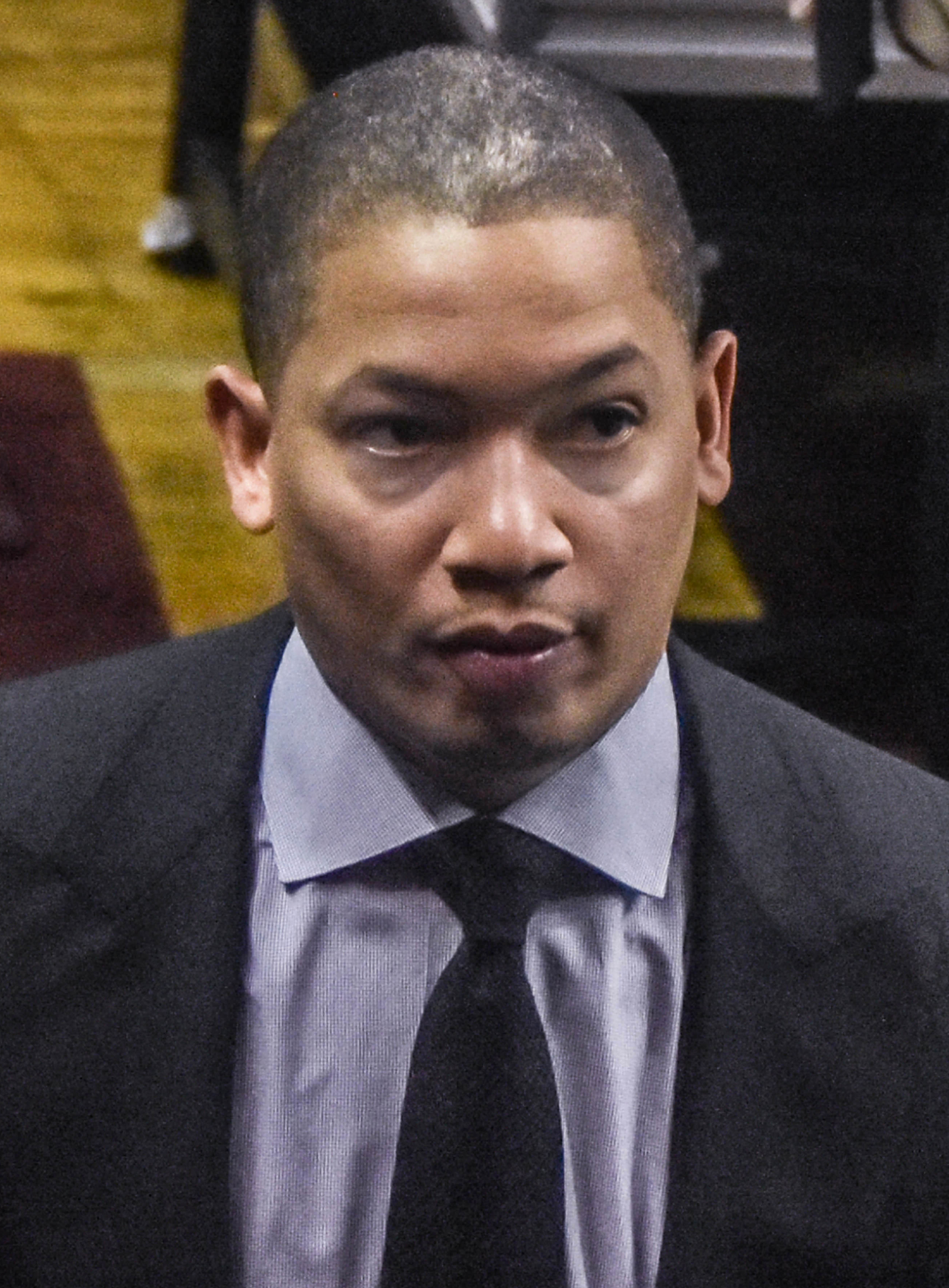
Tyronn Lue took over as head coach midway through the 2015–16 season, leading the team to their first NBA Title.

The Cavaliers enter the 2015–16 season seeking redemption following a disappointing, injury-riddled exit from the NBA Finals. While the Cavaliers kept just five players in 2015, they had a returning cast of 11 players heading into the 2015–16 season. Love silenced many a doubter with his decision to sign a five-year deal to stay in Cleveland, spurning bigger markets and roles in the process. Smith, Shumpert and Dellavedova agreed to new contracts as well.

During the 2015–16 season, James was criticized for his role in several off-court controversies, including the midseason firing of head coach David Blatt. Despite the Cavaliers' boasting the best record in the Eastern Conference at 30–11, Blatt was fired on January 22 and replaced by his assistant Tyronn Lue. The lack of chemistry and cohesion was the catalyst for the move. Lue had a firm, even-handed approach to coaching the Cavs, building trust within a team that often seemed on the verge of splintering. He managed egos, implemented an up-tempo offense and made some deft decisions.

The Cavaliers entered the 2016 NBA playoffs as the first seed in the East with a 57–25 record, and once again advanced through the first three rounds of the playoffs virtually unchallenged, reaching the NBA Finals with a 12–2 postseason record, including winning 10 straight games as they threatened to sweep through the Eastern Conference playoffs. The 10–0 start to the playoffs saw Lue pass Pat Riley (9–0) for the most consecutive playoff wins to start a coaching career. They defeated the Detroit Pistons in the first round to set up a Conference Finals rematch with the Atlanta Hawks. The Cavs swept the Hawks and defeated the Toronto Raptors in the Conference Finals in six games.

In the NBA Finals, the Cavaliers faced a rematch with the Golden State Warriors. The Warriors, coming off an NBA-best 73–9 regular season record, raced to a 2–0 series lead after handing the Cavaliers back-to-back blowout losses in Games 1 and 2. The Cavaliers responded with a blowout win of their own in Game 3, before falling behind 3–1 in the series with a loss in Game 4. James and Irving responded in Game 5, with both scoring 41 points to lead the Cavaliers to a 112–97 win in Oakland. The pair became the first teammates to each score 40 points in an NBA Finals game. James continued his hot form in Game 6, as he put together his second consecutive 41-point game, leading the Cavaliers to two consecutive wins to stave off elimination. In Game 7 at Oracle Arena in Oakland, a number of key plays down the stretch in the fourth quarter put the Cavaliers in position for victory: James' chase-down block on Andre Iguodala with 1:50 to go; Irving's three-pointer with 53 seconds left that propelled the Cavaliers to a 92–89 lead; and Love's defensive play on Stephen Curry in the ensuing possession. Cleveland emerged victorious with a 93–89 win to earn the city's first professional sports title in 52 years. James was named the unanimous Finals MVP. James became the third player to have a triple-double in Game 7 of the NBA Finals, joining Jerry West in 1969 and James Worthy in 1988. He had 27 points, 11 rebounds and 11 assists in the clincher, capping a series where the Cavaliers became the first team to successfully overcome a 3–1 deficit in the Finals.

An estimated 1.3 million people attended the downtown victory parade on June 22. At the championship rally later that day, general manager David Griffin noted that "The Shot, The Drive, The Fumble all must now be replaced by The Block, the three, and the D."

=== 2016–2018: Rivalry with Golden State ===
The 2016–17 season was marred by injuries and unexpected losses for the Cavaliers. LeBron James described it as one of the "strangest" years of his career, and felt the Cavs' roster was too "top heavy" after falling to 30–14 following a three-game losing streak in late January. The team had fickle chemistry and camaraderie out on the floor due to the constant changing of line-ups. The Cavaliers finished the regular season as the second seed in the East with a 51–31 record, after losing their final four games. Despite this, the Cavaliers rolled through the Eastern Conference playoffs, going 12–1 and putting up the best offensive efficiency in the history of the postseason through the first three rounds, besting the "Showtime" Los Angeles Lakers of the 1980s. However, they met their match in the 2017 NBA Finals, facing the Golden State Warriors in a highly anticipated rematch. The Warriors had gone 12–0 in their Western Conference playoff run, and took down the Cavaliers in five games despite James averaging 33.6 points, 12.0 rebounds and 10.0 assists to become the first player to average a triple-double in the championship round.

In the 2017 off-season, Kyrie Irving demanded a trade, citing that he no longer wanted to play second fiddle to LeBron. Irving's wish was later granted, sending him to the Boston Celtics.

Midseason saw a massive overhaul of the Cavaliers roster, such as trading Dwyane Wade to the Miami Heat, Isaiah Thomas to the Los Angeles Lakers for Larry Nance Jr. and Jordan Clarkson, and Derrick Rose and Jae Crowder were shipped to the Utah Jazz in exchange for George Hill. This new roster made the Cavaliers play better. They made it to the NBA Finals for the fourth straight year, only again to be stopped by the Warriors, who swept them 4–0.

After the Finals, three frontrunners emerged as favorites to sign LeBron: The Cavs, Los Angeles Lakers, and Philadelphia 76ers. LeBron signed with the Lakers, leaving Cleveland again. Trying to stay competitive, the Cavs re-signed Kevin Love to 4-year, $120 million extension.

== 2018–2022: Post-James era ==
=== 2018–2021: Growing pains ===
After LeBron had left, Cleveland's plan was to remain competitive with Collin Sexton and Cedi Osman developing together and led by Love, but, unfortunately, injuries to Love and Tristan Thompson derailed the Cavs season with few bright spots, such as Osman performing in the Rising Stars Challenge. Tyronn Lue would be fired after starting the '18-'19 season 0–6, replaced by interim coach Larry Drew. The Cavs would miss the 2019 NBA playoffs and receive the fifth pick in the 2019 NBA draft.

The Cavs selected Darius Garland out of Vanderbilt, looking to pair him with Collin Sexton in the backcourt. The Cavs also had two other first round selections, taking wingmen Kevin Porter Jr. and Dylan Windler. The Cavs also hired John Beilein, previously head coach of the Michigan Wolverines men's basketball team. With pairing Sexton and Garland, as well as selecting Windler, Beilein stated favoring implementing a free flowing offense with multiple shooters on the floor together. During the 2020 NBA trade deadline, the Cavaliers acquired two-time All-Star Andre Drummond from the Detroit Pistons to pair alongside Love, Sexton, and Garland. Beilein would also be fired midway through the '19-'20 season, replaced by J.B. Bickerstaff. While the team played better with Drummond, the NBA season was cut short due to the COVID-19 pandemic, and when the season resumed, the Cavaliers - due to being out of playoff contention when the season was suspended - were not invited back to play in the NBA Bubble which had been set up to complete the season.

In the 2020 NBA draft, the Cavs selected wingman Isaac Okoro out of Auburn with the fifth overall pick, and following a pandemic delayed and injury riddled '20-'21 season, the Cavs would again miss the playoffs in Bickerstaff's first full season as head coach.

All totaled, in the first three seasons since James went to the Lakers, the Cavs won a total of 60 games, and missed the playoffs each year.

=== 2021–2022: Rebuilding ===
With the third pick in 2021 NBA draft, the Cavs selected power forward Evan Mobley out of USC, and also acquired point guard Ricky Rubio, re-signed center Jarrett Allen, and traded for forward Lauri Markkanen. For the '21-'22 season. the Cavaliers would go against recent NBA "small ball" trends by starting three near seven-footers in Mobley, Allen, and Markkanen - a troika which would become known as the "Tower City" lineup (a reference to Tower City Center in downtown Cleveland) along with guards Sexton and Garland, and wingmen Osman and Okoro to form the young core, with Love and Rubio providing veteran leadership off the bench. Though Sexton and Rubio would both suffer season ending knee injuries during the season, the team defied expectations, and was a contender in the Eastern Conference. In early 2022, the team traded for two-time NBA Champion Rajon Rondo, and he essentially took over Rubio's role as the veteran backup point guard, and would trade Rubio and some draft picks to the Indiana Pacers for wingman Caris LeVert. Garland and Allen would subsequently be named to the 2022 NBA All-Star Team - with the game itself having been played at Rocket Mortgage FieldHouse on February 20, 2022. The Cavs would finish the season with a 44–38 record and qualified for the NBA play-in tournament. The team however would not advance further, as they lost the 7 vs. 8 game to the Brooklyn Nets, and the 8 vs. 9 game to the Atlanta Hawks, ending their season.

== 2022–present: The Donovan Mitchell era ==
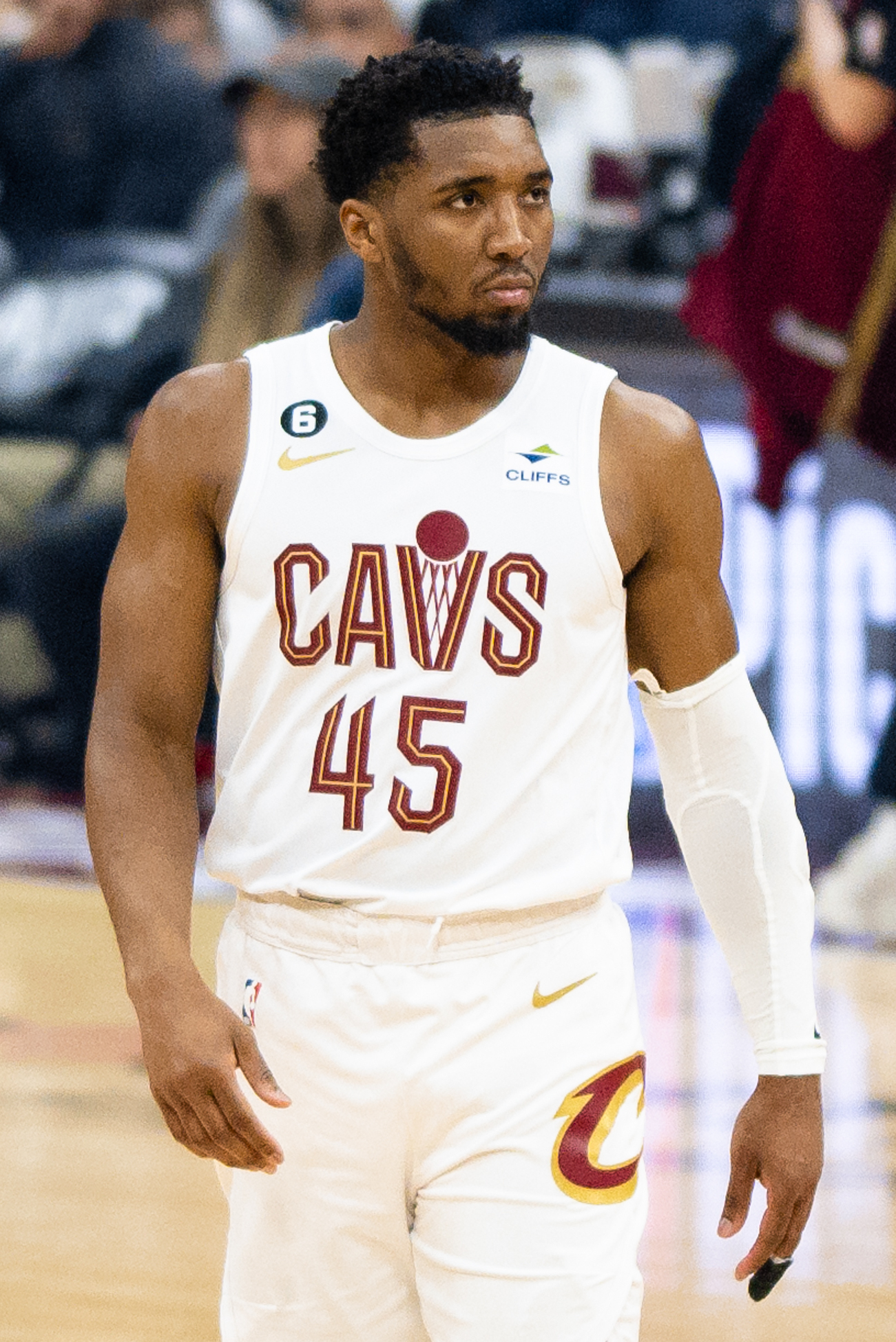
Donovan Mitchell was acquired by the Cavaliers through a trade with the Utah Jazz in 2022.

During the 2022 offseason, the Cavs signed veteran center Robin Lopez and resigned Ricky Rubio to help bring depth to the bench and leadership into the locker room. Their biggest move would be trading Collin Sexton, Ochai Agbaji (who the Cavs selected in the first round of that year's draft), and Lauri Markkanen, as well as various draft picks and pick swaps to the Utah Jazz for four-time All-Star guard Donovan Mitchell, forming a "Big 4" nucleus alongside Darius Garland, Jarrett Allen, and Evan Mobley (whose brother Isaiah was taken by the Cavs in the second round of the 2022 draft). Mitchell would be selected to his fifth All-Star Game in 2023 (first with the Cavs). In February 2023, the Cavs signed veteran guard Danny Green, who the Cavs originally drafted in 2009, and would go on to play for various other teams, winning three NBA Championships, while Kevin Love - the last member of the 2016 NBA Championship team still with the Cavs - would receive a requested contract buyout. On March 26, 2023, the Cavaliers defeated the Houston Rockets 108–91, and with that win clinched a playoff spot. This marks their first playoff appearance since the 2017–18 season, and the first Cavaliers team without LeBron James to make the playoffs since the 1997–98 squad. The Cavaliers would finish the regular season with a 51–31 record, placing second in the Central Division. This was the first Cavs team to win 50 games without LeBron James since the 1992–1993 squad. They lost in the first round to the New York Knicks 4–1.

During the 2023 offseason, the Cavs signed swingman Max Strus, who had helped the Miami Heat reach the 2023 NBA Finals as their new starting small forward. Prior to the start of the season, the team unveiled a giant banner in downtown Cleveland featuring the "Big 4" (Mitchell, Garland, Allen, and Evan Mobley) hanging in the spot where the famous LeBron James banner was displayed for many years. After starting the '23-'24 season 13–12, the team would go on a stretch where they won 23 out of 28 games from December 15 through the All-Star break. During the season the team would sign forward Pete Nance, making him the third member of the Nance family to play for the Cavs (after his father Larry and brother Larry Jr.). As the teams played the bulk of their games without various members of the "Big 4" due to assorted injuries, they would finish 48–34, second place in the Central Division and the number four seed in the Eastern Conference playoffs. The Cavs defeated the Orlando Magic 4–3 in the first round, but would lose to the Boston Celtics 4–1 in the Conference semifinals, playing the entire series without Jarrett Allen and the last two games without Donovan Mitchell, who were both injured.

On May 23, 2024, the Cavs fired head coach J.B. Bickerstaff, who had a 170–159 regular season record, and 6–11 playoff record with the team.

On June 28, 2024, the Cavaliers hired Kenny Atkinson to replace Bickerstaff as the head coach. He would lead the Cavaliers to a 15-0 start after winning 128-114 against the Charlotte Hornets on November 17, 2024, which is tied for the second-best start in NBA history and the Cavaliers are the fourth team to achieve this milestone, after the 2015-2016 Golden State Warriors team, the 1993-1994 Houston Rockets team, and the 1948-1949 Washington Capitols team. The 15-0 start is also the Cavaliers’ longest winning streak in franchise history.

On November 19, 2024, the Boston Celtics ended the Cavaliers 15–0 start and 15 game winning streak when they won 120–117, giving the Cavaliers their first loss of the season.

Three Cavs Players, Mitchell, Garland and Mobley made the All-Star Team with Kenny Atkinson as a coach.

=== 2026–present: Departure of Darius Garland ===
On February 4, 2026, the Cavaliers sending a package centered around Garland to the Los Angeles Clippers in exchange for 36 year-old superstar guard James Harden, pairing him with Mitchell. After beating the Detroit Pistons 125–94 to win the series 4–3, the Cavaliers would advance to the Eastern Conference Finals for the first time since 2018 and the first time without LeBron James on their roster since 1992.

== See also ==
- History of Cleveland
