= David Griffin (basketball) =

American basketball executive (born 1973)

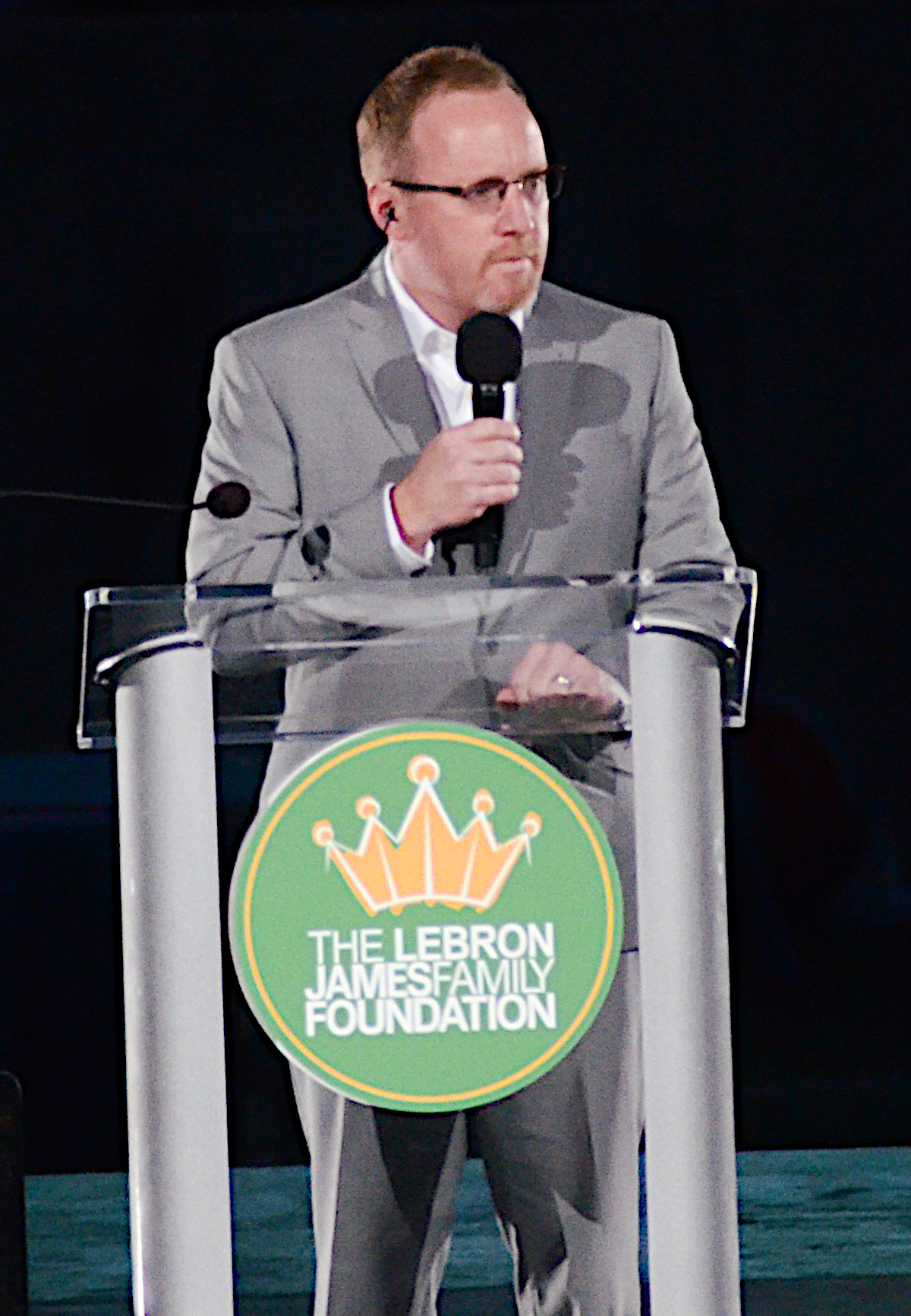
- Griffin in 2014

Personal information
- Born: November 16, 1973 (age 51); Phoenix, Arizona, U.S.

Career information
- High school: Brophy Prep (Phoenix, Arizona)
- College: Arizona State University
- Position: Executive Vice President of Basketball Operations

Career highlights
- As executive: NBA champion (2016)

David Griffin (born November 16, 1973) is an American former professional basketball executive who most recently was the executive vice president of basketball operations for the New Orleans Pelicans of the National Basketball Association (NBA). Prior to the Pelicans, he served as the general manager for the Cleveland Cavaliers, who won the NBA championship in 2016 and reached the NBA Finals in three consecutive seasons under his watch. Griffin also worked as an analyst for NBA TV.

== Early life ==
Griffin was born and raised in Phoenix, Arizona. He attended high school at Brophy College Preparatory. He enrolled at the University of Arizona but transferred to Arizona State University in 1993 in order to accept an internship with the Phoenix Suns organization. Griffin completed a bachelor's degree in Political Science in 1995.

== Early basketball career ==
Griffin started as a tournament director for the Nike Desert Classic pre-draft camp. He was also an assistant coach at Scottsdale Community College. Later, he worked as part of the basketball press information team during the 1996 Olympic Games in Atlanta, Georgia.

== Executive career ==
=== Phoenix Suns ===
Griffin spent 17 seasons with the Phoenix Suns, beginning with an internship with the team's public relations department in 1993 while he was still a student at Arizona State University. He was hired as a full-time media relations assistant after three years as an intern. Being noticed by Jerry Colangelo and then-coach Danny Ainge for his detailed notes for the media, Griffin joined the team's basketball operations side via the video department in 1997. He spent his last three years in the club as senior vice president of basketball operations after being named to the position in June 2007.

=== Cleveland Cavaliers ===
In September 2010, Griffin was named vice president of basketball operations for the Cleveland Cavaliers. On February 6, 2014, he was named the acting general manager for the Cavaliers, after the firing of Chris Grant from that position. In his first trade since becoming acting GM, Griffin traded forward Earl Clark, center Henry Sims, and draft picks to the Philadelphia 76ers for center Spencer Hawes. On May 12, 2014, the Cavaliers announced that Griffin would be named as permanent, full-time general manager.

In the following weeks after being named permanent GM, Griffin brought in Euroleague Champion and Coach of the Year David Blatt as head coach, drafted Andrew Wiggins with the number one pick in the 2014 NBA draft, signed LeBron James back four years after the infamous "Decision", and acquired All-Star forward Kevin Love from the Minnesota Timberwolves in a trade. In order to acquire Love, Griffin gave Wiggins and former 1st overall pick Anthony Bennett to the Wolves. As a result of these moves and many others, Griffin placed second in the NBA Executive of the Year Award voting for the 2014–15 season. Griffin and the Cavaliers won the 2016 NBA Finals after defeating the 73-win Golden State Warriors in seven games, becoming the first team in league history to overcome a 3–1 deficit in the Finals.

Griffin's Cavaliers set offensive records in the 2017 playoffs, setting a playoff scoring efficiency record by scoring 120 points per 100 possessions, but ultimately lost in five games in the 2017 Finals to a revamped Warriors team that added Kevin Durant to their 73-win core.

On June 19, 2017, both Griffin and Cavaliers owner Dan Gilbert announced that they would not renew their contract together after no agreement between the two sides could be reached. He would ultimately be replaced by the Cavaliers' assistant general manager, Koby Altman, over a month later on July 24. Gilbert was widely criticized for failing to come to terms on a new contract with Griffin.

For a Sports Illustrated article released Thursday August 1, 2019, David Griffin expressed in detail his experience working with and building a supporting cast of team members around LeBron James. He described the ordeal and time in Cleveland doing so as "miserable" and elaborating how "he privately wept the night the Cavaliers won the title, saying he was so obsessed with winning that he "didn't love the game anymore."

=== New Orleans Pelicans ===
On April 17, 2019, the New Orleans Pelicans named Griffin as the executive vice president of basketball operations. Griffin represented the Pelicans during the 2019 NBA draft lottery, where they won the right to the number 1 overall pick which they used to select Zion Williamson. In May 2021, after Williamson fractured his ring finger, Griffin accused opposing teams of physically targeting the star. He said, "There's more violence encouraged in the paint against Zion Williamson than any other player I've seen since [Shaquille O'Neal]...It was egregious and horrific then, and the same is true now."

On October 29, 2021, following a loss to the Sacramento Kings, Griffin reportedly found himself in conflict with Kings assistant head coach Alvin Gentry, who had been the Pelicans' head coach. According to reports, the two men engaged in an argument and had to be physically separated.

On April 14, 2025, Griffin was fired by the Pelicans after finishing the season with a 21–61 record. His overall record over the course of six seasons in New Orleans was 209–263. The Pelicans made the playoffs in just two of those seasons and failed to win a playoff series during Griffin's tenure.

== Personal life ==
Griffin is originally from Phoenix, Arizona, and now resides in Sonoma, California with his wife Meredith. Griffin was raised by a single mother in a Maryvale neighborhood of lower middle-class West Phoenix. He has a younger brother Daniel and he went to the Jesuit-run Brophy Prep for high school. He had three bouts with testicular cancer– in 2006, 2011 and 2017. In between the Cleveland and New Orleans stints, Griffin appeared frequently on NBA TV and hosted a weekly Sirius XM radio show called 'Deals and Dunks' with Pelicans broadcaster Joel Meyers as co-host. Griffin also enjoys playing piano and was reported to have attempted to win the heart of star forward Zion Williamson with a song, in the NBA Bubble in Orlando. This has been denied by both Williamson and Griffin himself during a Pelicans media event.
