= Chris Grant (basketball) =

American basketball executive (born 1972)

- Born: May 9, 1972 (age 54); Redwood City, California, U.S.
- Education: University of San Diego (BA) (MA)
- Employer(s): Atlanta Hawks, 1996-2005; Cleveland Cavaliers, 2005-2010 (Assistant GM)
- Title: Assistant General Manager / General Manager
- Term: (with Cavaliers) 2011–2014, as GM
- Predecessor: Danny Ferry (as Cleveland Cavaliers GM)
- Successor: David Griffin (as Cleveland Cavaliers GM)

Chris Grant (born May 9, 1972) is an American professional basketball executive, and was most recently the general manager of the Cleveland Cavaliers.

== College ==
A native of South Lake Tahoe, California, Grant attended the University of San Diego where the 6'8" center played on the men's varsity basketball team, including a year with former Cavaliers coach Mike Brown. He graduated in 1994 with a degree in psychology, also later earning a master's degree in educational leadership from the University of San Diego.

== NBA ==
Grant was hired by the Atlanta Hawks immediately following graduate school. He worked there for nine years, holding several different positions and moved up the ranks, culminating with being named vice president of basketball operations and assistant general manager in 2004. In 2005, he was hired by Danny Ferry to work for the Cleveland Cavaliers. After Ferry's resignation, he was named the new general manager on June 4, 2010. Grant was dismissed by the Cavaliers on February 6, 2014. On October 14, 2016, it was confirmed that Grant had taken a position with the San Antonio Spurs for a role as a team scout. On January 12, 2024, Grant began a second stint in Atlanta, as he joined the Hawks front office as an Executive Advisor.
