= 2016 NBA Finals =

2016 basketball championship series

- The wordmark of the NBA Finals (2003–2017)
Team	Coach	Wins
Cleveland Cavaliers	Tyronn Lue	4
Golden State Warriors	Steve Kerr	3
- Dates: June 2–19
- MVP: LeBron James (Cleveland Cavaliers)
- Hall of Famers: Officials: Danny Crawford (2025)
- Eastern finals: Cavaliers defeated Raptors, 4–2
- Western finals: Warriors defeated Thunder, 4–3

The 2016 NBA Finals was the championship series of the National Basketball Association's (NBA) 2015–16 season and conclusion of the season's playoffs. A rematch of the 2015 Finals, the best-of-seven series featured Eastern Conference champion Cleveland Cavaliers defeating the defending champion and Western Conference champion Golden State Warriors in seven games to win their first championship in franchise history. The series began on June 2 and ended on June 19. Cleveland's LeBron James was unanimously voted the NBA Finals Most Valuable Player (MVP), after averaging 29.7 points, 11.3 rebounds, 8.9 assists, 2.6 steals, and 2.3 blocks. He was also the first and only player in NBA history to lead all players in a playoff series in points, rebounds, assists, steals, and blocks.

The Warriors gained home-court advantage due to their league-best record of 73–9, setting an NBA record for the best regular season record by a team, and were considered favorites to win the series. The Warriors won three of the first four games and led 3–1 before the Cavaliers bounced back by winning three straight games to clinch the title. With the win, the Cavaliers became the first team to overcome a 3–1 series deficit in the NBA Finals, while also ending the 52-year championship drought among the major professional sports leagues in Cleveland, known as the Cleveland sports curse.

The Finals also marked the first since 1978 that a game seven was won by the road team. Cleveland's comeback, as well as James's performance in the series, which included a clutch block in Game 7 on Andre Iguodala, have it considered as the greatest Finals of all time. This was the first NBA Finals since 1997 in which both teams won a total of at least 130 combined regular season games.

== Background ==
=== Cleveland Cavaliers ===
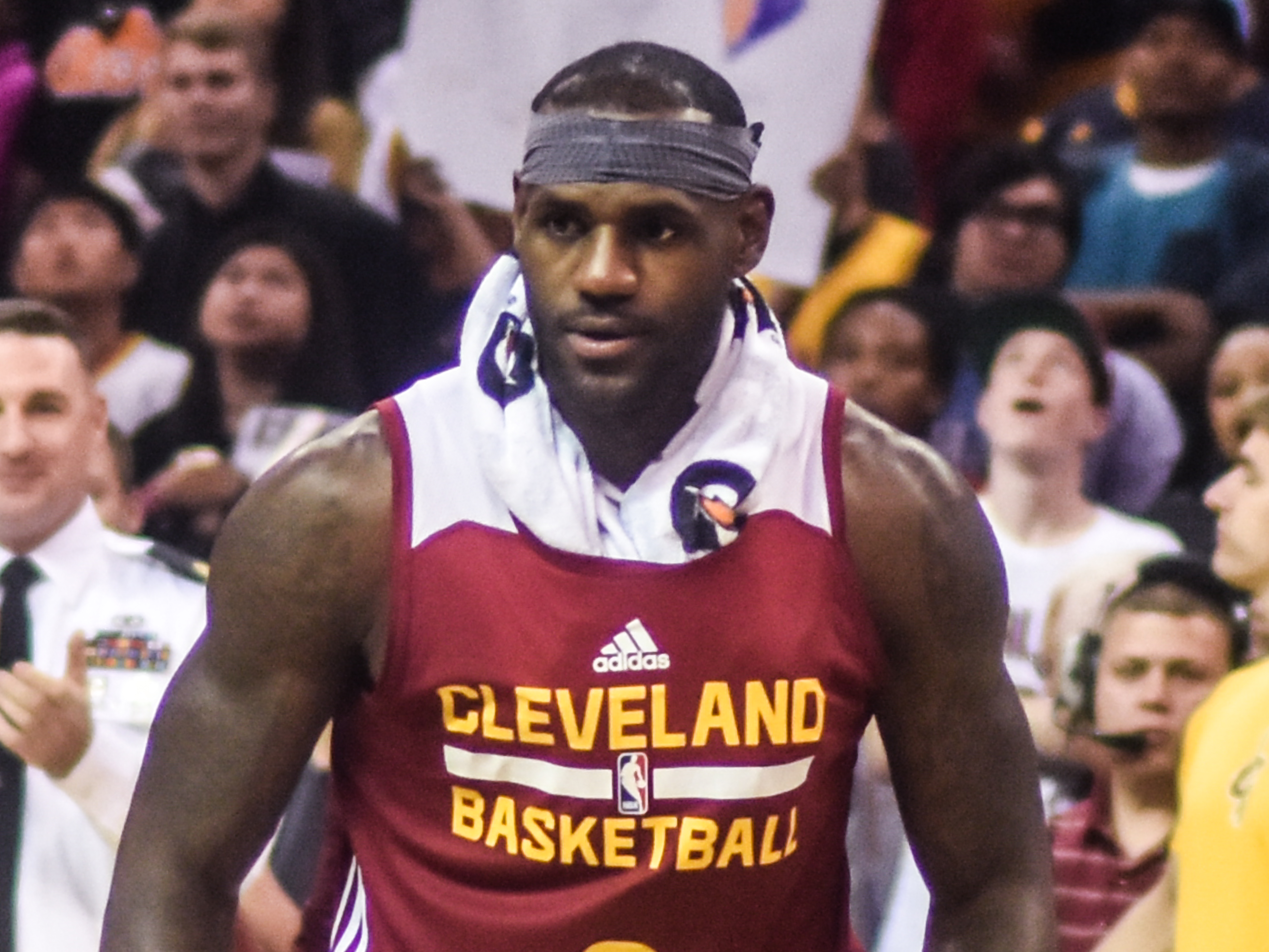
LeBron James advanced to his sixth straight Finals.

This was Cleveland's second consecutive trip to the NBA Finals, and third overall, seeking to win their first ever NBA championship. This would also be the sixth consecutive NBA Finals appearance for LeBron James, the most for any player not part of the 1960s Boston Celtics, and the fifth for James Jones (who technically qualified for the 2011 NBA Finals along with James, but did not play).

Despite holding the best record in the Eastern Conference at 30–11 midway through the season on January 22, 2016, the Cavaliers fired head coach David Blatt. Associate head coach Tyronn Lue was then promoted to replace Blatt. General Manager David Griffin cited "a lack of fit with our personnel and our vision" as the reason for Blatt's firing.

Cleveland finished the regular season with a 57–25 record, capturing the Central Division title and the top playoff seed in the Eastern Conference. They then advanced to the Finals after sweeping both the Detroit Pistons during the first round and the Atlanta Hawks in the Eastern Conference Semifinals before defeating the Toronto Raptors during the Eastern Conference Finals in six games. The Cavaliers were the first team in history to go to two consecutive NBA Finals with rookie head coaches.

=== Golden State Warriors ===
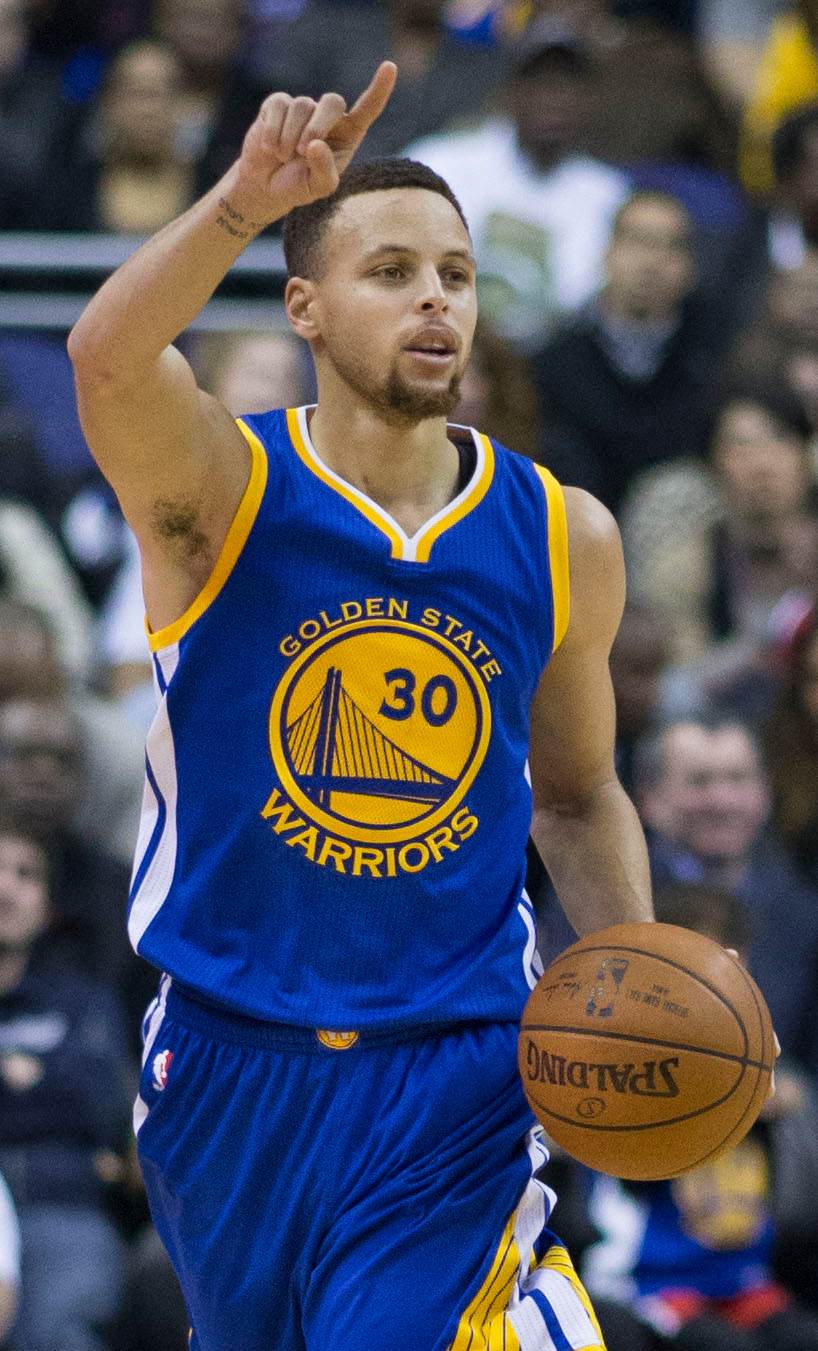
Stephen Curry won his second consecutive NBA Most Valuable Player Award.

This was the defending NBA Champion Golden State Warriors' second consecutive trip to the NBA Finals and eighth overall. The Warriors broke the record set by the 1995–96 Chicago Bulls by finishing the regular season with a 73–9 record. In addition, the Warriors broke numerous other NBA records, including most road wins (34), best start to a season (24–0) and longest regular-season home win streak (54 dating back to the 2014–15 season). They also became the first team to make over 1,000 three-pointers in the regular-season with 1,077, eclipsing the previous record of 933 set by the 2014–15 Houston Rockets.

The Warriors were led by Stephen Curry, who was named the NBA Most Valuable Player (MVP) for the second straight season. The Splash Brothers twosome of Curry and Klay Thompson were the highest scoring duo in the league, combining to average 52.2 points per game. Head coach Steve Kerr missed the first 43 regular season games because of a back injury. Assistant coach Luke Walton served as interim head coach during Kerr's absence and he led the Warriors to a 39–4 start.

In the playoffs, the Warriors defeated the Houston Rockets in the first round and the Portland Trail Blazers in the conference semifinals in five games each. Curry missed six games in the first two rounds due to injuries. He missed two games after tweaking his right ankle in Game 1 against the Rockets. In his first game back in Game 4, Curry sprained his right knee and was sidelined for two weeks, missing four games. In Game 7 of the Western Conference finals, the Warriors defeated the Oklahoma City Thunder, 96–88, becoming only the 10th team in NBA history to overcome a 3–1 series deficit, and advancing to a second straight NBA Finals for the first time since 1947 and 1948.

=== Road to the Finals ===
Cleveland Cavaliers (Eastern Conference champion)		Golden State Warriors (Western Conference champion)
Eastern Conference: # / Team / W / L / PCT / GB / GP; 1 / c – Cleveland Cavaliers * / 57 / 25 / .695 / – / 82; 2 / y – Toronto Raptors * / 56 / 26 / .683 / 1.0 / 82; 3 / y – Miami Heat * / 48 / 34 / .585 / 9.0 / 82; 4 / x – Atlanta Hawks / 48 / 34 / .585 / 9.0 / 82; 5 / x – Boston Celtics / 48 / 34 / .585 / 9.0 / 82; 6 / x – Charlotte Hornets / 48 / 34 / .585 / 9.0 / 82; 7 / x – Indiana Pacers / 45 / 37 / .549 / 12.0 / 82; 8 / x – Detroit Pistons / 44 / 38 / .537 / 13.0 / 82; 9 / e – Chicago Bulls / 42 / 40 / .512 / 15.0 / 82; 10 / e – Washington Wizards / 41 / 41 / .500 / 16.0 / 82; 11 / e – Orlando Magic / 35 / 47 / .427 / 22.0 / 82; 12 / e – Milwaukee Bucks / 33 / 49 / .402 / 24.0 / 82; 13 / e – New York Knicks / 32 / 50 / .390 / 25.0 / 82; 14 / e – Brooklyn Nets / 21 / 61 / .256 / 36.0 / 82; 15 / e – Philadelphia 76ers / 10 / 72 / .122 / 47.0 / 82; 1st seed in the East, 3rd best league record	Regular season	Western Conference: # / Team / W / L / PCT / GB / GP; 1 / z – Golden State Warriors * / 73 / 9 / .890 / – / 82; 2 / y – San Antonio Spurs * / 67 / 15 / .817 / 6.0 / 82; 3 / y – Oklahoma City Thunder * / 55 / 27 / .671 / 18.0 / 82; 4 / x – Los Angeles Clippers / 53 / 29 / .646 / 20.0 / 82; 5 / x – Portland Trail Blazers / 44 / 38 / .537 / 29.0 / 82; 6 / x – Dallas Mavericks / 42 / 40 / .512 / 31.0 / 82; 7 / x – Memphis Grizzlies / 42 / 40 / .512 / 31.0 / 82; 8 / x – Houston Rockets / 41 / 41 / .500 / 32.0 / 82; 9 / e – Utah Jazz / 40 / 42 / .488 / 33.0 / 82; 10 / e – Sacramento Kings / 33 / 49 / .402 / 40.0 / 82; 11 / e – Denver Nuggets / 33 / 49 / .402 / 40.0 / 82; 12 / e – New Orleans Pelicans / 30 / 52 / .366 / 43.0 / 82; 13 / e – Minnesota Timberwolves / 29 / 53 / .354 / 44.0 / 82; 14 / e – Phoenix Suns / 23 / 59 / .280 / 50.0 / 82; 15 / e – Los Angeles Lakers / 17 / 65 / .207 / 56.0 / 82; 1st seed in the West, best league record
Defeated the 8th seeded Detroit Pistons, 4–0	First round	Defeated the 8th seeded Houston Rockets, 4–1
Defeated the 4th seeded Atlanta Hawks, 4–0	Conference semifinals	Defeated the 5th seeded Portland Trail Blazers, 4–1
Defeated the 2nd seeded Toronto Raptors, 4–2	Conference finals	Defeated the 3rd seeded Oklahoma City Thunder, 4–3

=== Regular season series ===
The Warriors won the regular season series 2–0.

December 25, 2015

Recap

Cleveland Cavaliers 83, Golden State Warriors 89

Oracle Arena, Oakland, California

January 18, 2016

Recap

Golden State Warriors 132, Cleveland Cavaliers 98

Quicken Loans Arena, Cleveland, Ohio

The Warriors defeated the Cavaliers 89–83 on Christmas 2015, in a low-scoring, NBA Finals rematch. Draymond Green led with 22 points and 15 rebounds, while Stephen Curry added 19 points despite calf issues. LeBron James led Cleveland with 25 points, but the Cavs shot just 5-of-30 from 3-point range. By their 2015 meeting, Kyrie Irving and Kevin Love had recovered from their injuries that plagued them in the 2015 Finals. Their next match-up came during a 132–98 Warriors blow out win at Quicken Loans Arena on January 18, 2016. Just a few days later, head coach David Blatt was fired by general manager David Griffin, despite the team having the best record in the Eastern Conference, and assistant Tyronn Lue took over for the remainder of the season.

== Series summary ==
For the first time since 2004, a new scheduling format was instituted for the Finals. In the previous years, the Finals were played in a Thursday–Sunday–Tuesday scheme. However, the league changed its scheduling to ensure an extra day off for both teams when traveling between the two cities. This, along with the designated travel day, took place after Games 2, 4, 5, and 6 in subsequent finals. This scheduling change was necessary as a result of the National Hockey League instituting a new scheduling format for its championship series that went into effect beginning in 2016.

Game	Date	Road team	Result	Home team
Game 1	June 2	Cleveland Cavaliers	89–104 (0–1)	Golden State Warriors
Game 2	June 5	Cleveland Cavaliers	77–110 (0–2)	Golden State Warriors
Game 3	June 8	Golden State Warriors	90–120 (2–1)	Cleveland Cavaliers
Game 4	June 10	Golden State Warriors	108–97 (3–1)	Cleveland Cavaliers
Game 5	June 13	Cleveland Cavaliers	112–97 (2–3)	Golden State Warriors
Game 6	June 16	Golden State Warriors	101–115 (3–3)	Cleveland Cavaliers
Game 7	June 19	Cleveland Cavaliers	93–89 (4–3)	Golden State Warriors

== Game summaries ==
All times are in Eastern Daylight Time (UTC−4)

=== Game 1 ===
ABC

June 2
9:00 PM

Boxscore

Cleveland Cavaliers 89, Golden State Warriors 104
Scoring by quarter: 24–28, 19–24, 25–22, 21–30
Pts: Kyrie Irving 26; Rebs: Kevin Love 13; Asts: LeBron James 9	Pts: Shaun Livingston 20; Rebs: Draymond Green 11; Asts: Draymond Green 7
Golden State leads series, 1–0

Oracle Arena, Oakland, California
Attendance: 19,596
Referees:
- No. 41 Ken Mauer
- No. 8 Marc Davis
- No. 14 Ed Malloy

The Warriors defeated the Cavaliers 104–89 in Game 1 to take a 1–0 series lead. The Cavaliers led 68–67 before the Warriors broke the game open with a 29–9 run spanning the third and fourth quarters to take a 96–76 lead. Cleveland cut the deficit to within eleven points at 98–87 after an 11–2 run, but Stephen Curry and Klay Thompson nailed back-to-back three-pointers to essentially seal the victory for Golden State. While Curry and Thompson had a rough night combining for 20 points, the Warriors got a lift from its bench, outscoring the Cavaliers' bench 45–10. Shaun Livingston scored his playoff-career high 20 points to lead Golden State, while Kyrie Irving led all scorers with 26 points. LeBron James fell one assist shy of a triple-double (23 points, 12 rebounds, 9 assists).

=== Game 2 ===
ABC

June 5
8:00 PM

Boxscore

Cleveland Cavaliers 77, Golden State Warriors 110
Scoring by quarter: 21–19, 23–33, 18–30, 15–28
Pts: LeBron James 19; Rebs: LeBron James 8 Asts: LeBron James 9	Pts: Draymond Green 28; Rebs: Stephen Curry 9 Asts: Green, Livingston, Klay Thompson 5 each
Golden State leads series, 2–0

Oracle Arena, Oakland, California
Attendance: 19,596
Referees:
- No. 48 Scott Foster
- No. 25 Tony Brothers
- No. 19 James Capers

The Warriors defeated the Cavaliers 110–77 in Game 2 to take a 2–0 series lead. Cleveland took a 28–22 lead about two minutes into the second quarter, but Golden State answered with a 20–2 run while outscoring the Cavs 30–16 the rest of the period. During the run, the Cavaliers' Kevin Love suffered a head injury while attempting to grab a defensive rebound. Love stayed throughout the remainder of the period but did not play the second half. The Warriors continued to dominate Cleveland from there, outscoring the Cavaliers 58–33 in the final two quarters. Draymond Green led all scorers with 28 points, including 5-of-8 from three-point range. Curry and Klay Thompson added 18 and 17 points, respectively, while drilling four three-pointers each.

With their victory, Golden State posted the highest winning margin in the first two Finals games with a 48-point differential. James led Cleveland with 19 points, eight rebounds, nine assists, and four steals, surpassing John Stockton for fourth on the all-time playoff steals list. However, James also committed seven turnovers in the loss.

=== Game 3 ===
ABC

June 8
9:00 PM

Boxscore

Golden State Warriors 90, Cleveland Cavaliers 120
Scoring by quarter: 16–33, 27–18, 26–38, 21–31
Pts: Stephen Curry 19; Rebs: Harrison Barnes 8 Asts: Draymond Green 7	Pts: LeBron James 32; Rebs: Tristan Thompson 13; Asts: Kyrie Irving 8
Golden State leads series, 2–1

Quicken Loans Arena, Cleveland, Ohio
Attendance: 20,562
Referees:
- No. 13 Monty McCutchen
- No. 9 Derrick Stafford
- No. 15 Zach Zarba

The Cavaliers avenged their lopsided defeat to Golden State by routing the Warriors 120–90 in Game 3 to cut the series deficit to 2–1. Cleveland scored the game's first nine points en route to outscoring the Warriors 33–16 after one quarter, but Golden State rallied to trim Cleveland's lead as low as seven points on a couple of occasions before the Cavaliers settled for a 51–43 halftime lead. In the second half, Cleveland continued to extend their lead and outscored Golden State 69–47. Love did not play due to a concussion. James led all scorers with 32 points, while Irving added 30 points for the Cavaliers. Curry led the Warriors with 19 points, while drilling four threes. Harrison Barnes also contributed 18 points in 33 minutes of play.

=== Game 4 ===
ABC

June 10
9:00 PM

Boxscore

Golden State Warriors 108, Cleveland Cavaliers 97
Scoring by quarter: 29–28, 21–27, 29–22, 29–20
Pts: Stephen Curry 38; Rebs: Draymond Green 12; Asts: Andre Iguodala 7	Pts: Kyrie Irving 34; Rebs: LeBron James 13; Asts: LeBron James 9
Golden State leads series, 3–1

Quicken Loans Arena, Cleveland, Ohio
Attendance: 20,562
Referees:
- No. 43 Dan Crawford
- No. 24 Mike Callahan
- No. 23 Jason Phillips

The Warriors defeated the Cavaliers 108–97 in Game 4 to take a 3–1 series lead. After averaging just 16 points in the first three games of the series, Curry scored 38 and was 7-of-13 on three-pointers. Golden State made 17 three-pointers, then an NBA record for a single Finals game. They made only 16 two-point field goals, the first time in Finals history a team made more shots from three-point range. Klay Thompson added 25 points and four three-pointers for Golden State. It was the Warriors' 88th win of the season, which broke the 1995–96 Chicago Bulls record of 87 for most wins in an NBA season (regular-season and postseason combined).

Green and James had to be separated in the closing minutes of the game, when Green fell to the ground and James stepped over him. Feeling disrespected, Green swung his arm and appeared to make contact with James' groin.

On an NBA TV broadcast after the game, a photo captured James starring straight ahead in sunglasses wearing Powerbeats during a postgame interview. Below the photo of James read a graphic, "No team in NBA Finals history has come back from trailing 3–1 (0–32)". This photo later became a viral meme after the Cavs became the first team in NBA history to comeback from 3–1 in the Finals.

=== Game 5 ===
ABC

June 13
9:00 PM

Boxscore

Cleveland Cavaliers 112, Golden State Warriors 97
Scoring by quarter: 29–32, 32–29, 32–23, 19–13
Pts: Irving, James 41 each Rebs: LeBron James 16; Asts: LeBron James 7	Pts: Klay Thompson 37; Rebs: Andre Iguodala 11; Asts: Andre Iguodala 6
Golden State leads series, 3–2

Oracle Arena, Oakland, California
Attendance: 19,596
Referees:
- No. 13 Monty McCutchen
- No. 8 Marc Davis
- No. 9 Derrick Stafford

The Cavaliers defeated the Warriors 112–97 in Game 5 to narrow the Warriors' series lead to 3–2. James and Irving each scored 41 points to become the first teammates in Finals history to score 40 or more in the same game. The former also added 16 rebounds, seven assists, three steals, and three blocks, while the latter had six assists of his own. After Game 4, Green was assessed a Flagrant Foul 1 for his contact with James that was ruled "unnecessary" and "retaliatory", and James was given a technical foul for taunting. Having accumulated his fourth flagrant foul point in the playoffs, Green was suspended for Game 5, becoming the first player to be suspended from playing in an NBA Finals game since Jerry Stackhouse in 2006. Green watched the game from a luxury box in the nearby Oakland Alameda Coliseum, where the Oakland Athletics were also playing a game at the same time, hosting the Texas Rangers.

Warriors center Andrew Bogut suffered a season-ending injury to his left knee in the second half while jumping to block a layup attempt by Cavaliers guard J. R. Smith and came down awkwardly on Smith.

Postgame, Tyronn Lue famously took $200 from the whole Cavaliers roster and hid it in the ceiling of the visiting locker room as motivation to get back after they came back and won Game 7.

=== Game 6 ===
ABC

June 16
9:00 PM

Boxscore

Golden State Warriors 101, Cleveland Cavaliers 115
Scoring by quarter: 11–31, 32–28, 28–21, 30–35
Pts: Stephen Curry 30; Rebs: Draymond Green 10; Asts: Draymond Green 6	Pts: LeBron James 41; Rebs: Tristan Thompson 16; Asts: LeBron James 11
Series tied, 3–3

Quicken Loans Arena, Cleveland, Ohio
Attendance: 20,562
Referees:
- No. 48 Scott Foster
- No. 41 Ken Mauer
- No. 23 Jason Phillips

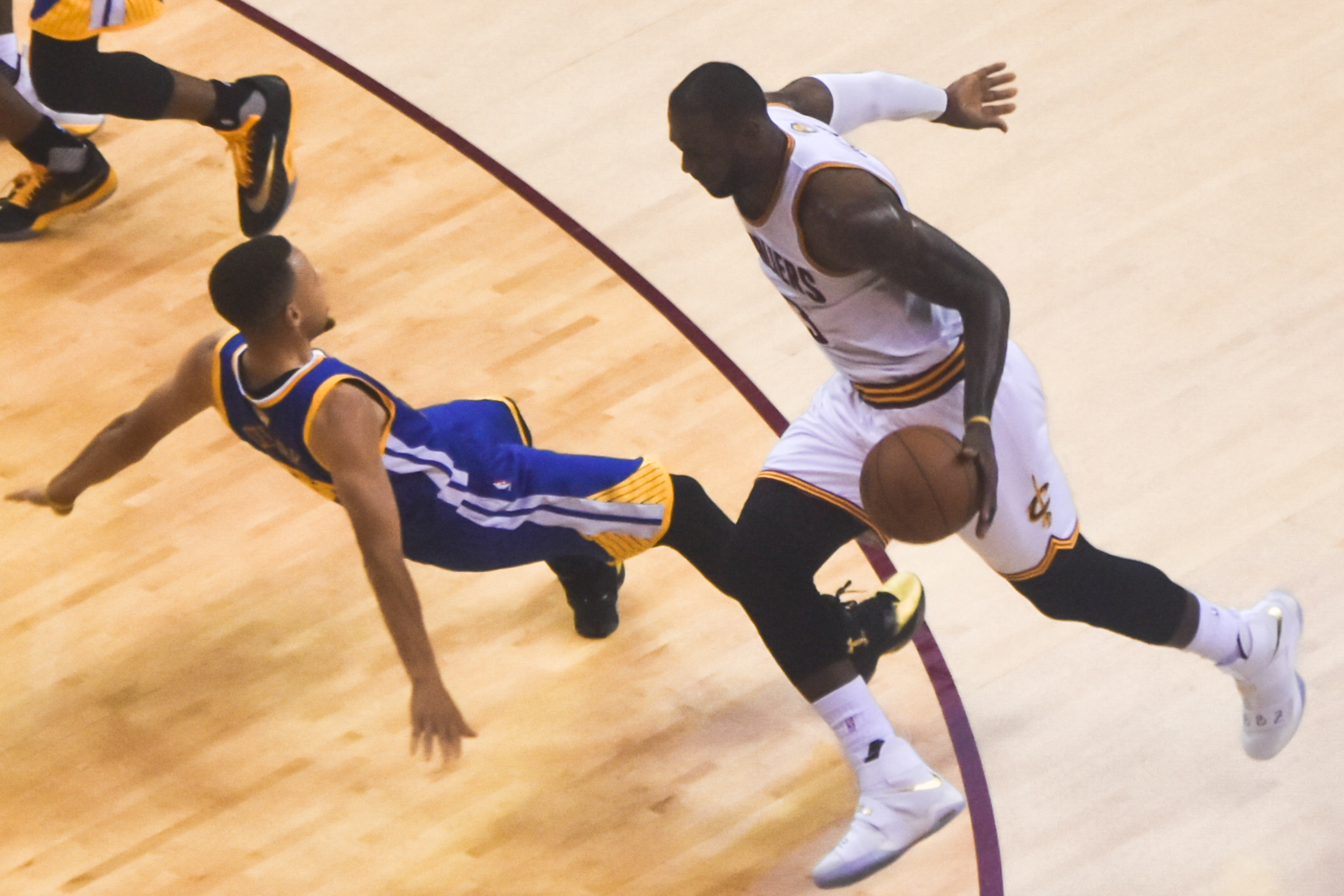
LeBron James charging at Stephen Curry during Game 6.

The Cavaliers defeated the Warriors 115–101 in Game 6 to even the series 3–3. Cleveland scored the game's first eight points en route to outscoring Golden State 31–11 after the first quarter. The Warriors rallied to trim the Cavaliers' lead as low as eight points on a couple of occasions before the Cavs settled for a 59–43 halftime lead, with Tristan Thompson having his best performance of the series, registering a double-double in the first half alone. In the second half, Cleveland continued to extend their lead and tied the series. LeBron James led the Cavs with a historic performance of 41 points, 11 assists, eight rebounds, four steals, and three blocks while only committing one turnover. Kyrie Irving added 23 points, while Tristan Thompson had 16 rebounds for the Cavaliers. Stephen Curry led the Warriors with 30 points, drilling six threes, and Klay Thompson added 25 points. Back from suspension, Green was held to just eight points on 3-of-7 shooting.

James scored 18 straight points for Cleveland from the end of the third quarter to the seven-minute mark of the fourth. Late in the game with the Cavaliers up by 13, he blocked a Curry shot from behind and had some words for him afterward. With 4:22 left, Curry received his sixth foul and was fouled out of the game. He then threw his mouthpiece into the stands in frustration, resulting in a technical foul and his ejection from the game. Curry was the first MVP to foul out of an NBA Finals game since Shaquille O'Neal in 2000. The Cavaliers became the third team to fall behind 3–1 and force Game 7 (and the first in 50 years). James was the first player to have consecutive 40-point games in the Finals since, coincidentally, Shaquille O'Neal in the 2000 Finals. Following the game, Curry and Warriors head coach Steve Kerr were fined $25,000 each for their actions and public officiating criticism.

=== Game 7 ===
ABC

June 19
8:00 PM

Boxscore

Cleveland Cavaliers 93, Golden State Warriors 89
Scoring by quarter: 23–22, 19–27, 33–27, 18–13
Pts: LeBron James 27; Rebs: Kevin Love 14; Asts: LeBron James 11	Pts: Draymond Green 32; Rebs: Draymond Green 15; Asts: Draymond Green 9
Cleveland wins NBA Finals, 4–3

Oracle Arena, Oakland, California
Attendance: 19,596
Referees:
- No. 43 Dan Crawford
- No. 24 Mike Callahan
- No. 13 Monty McCutchen

External videos
- Full game broadcast by ESPN on ABC on YouTube

The day before Game 7, Tyronn Lue took the Cavs to San Quentin prison. They walked past the electric chair and spoke to inmates, and then Lue told the team: "That's pressure—not a Game 7."

This season's Finals marked the first time in NBA history in which both teams entered Game 7 with the same total points scored through six games (610 points each). The Cavaliers defeated the Warriors 93–89 in Game 7 to win the series 4–3. The game was close, with 20 lead changes and 11 ties. This was the only game in the series to have a final margin of fewer than 10 points. At halftime, the Warriors led 49–42. In the second half, the Cavaliers outscored the Warriors 51–40 as the Warriors failed to score a basket during the last 4:39 of the game. In the closing minutes of the fourth quarter, LeBron James delivered what became known as "The Block" on a layup attempt by Andre Iguodala with the score tied at 89 and 1:50 remaining in the game. It is considered to be one of James's greatest clutch moments, and his performance across the series—the only time in which a single player has led both teams in points, assists, steals, and blocks—is considered to be one of the best in NBA Finals history. This is cited both as a key sequence in deciding the outcome of the game, and as one of the most clutch defensive plays in NBA history. After the game ended, James remarked to ESPN, "Iguodala is a bad motherfucker! I had to go chase it down." James later recalled to Cleveland.com, "I was just like do not give up on the play. If you got an opportunity, just try to make this play. I was also thinking like, 'J.R., please don't foul him. I know I'm right there, I can get it, I can get it.' I was like, 'J.R., don't foul him, and Bron, get the ball before it hit the backboard.' And we did that."

Mike Breen, who called the Finals for ESPN on ABC, added: "It's just another example of how he's just not going to let them lose. That was the thought as well after he blocked the shot: This guy is just not going to let this team lose tonight." (Note: It was the Cavs' 110th game since the start of training camp, adding up preseason, regular-season and postseason contests, and James was playing in the 45th minute of the 47 he would log in Game 7 when he made The Block.)

Breen described the play thus:

Iguodala to Curry, back to Iguodala, up for the layup! Oh! Blocked by James! LeBron James with the rejection!

Andre Iguodala later gave his own perspective on the play, stating: "I'm like, 'dunk on his head.'" He then expressed how he knew Smith would have stolen the ball had he attempted the dunk. "Man, just put the ball up. Don't do nothin' stupid. And it was one of the loudest sounds I ever heard, BOOM! (referring to James' block)."

Kyrie Irving made a go-ahead three-point field goal over Stephen Curry to give Cleveland a 92–89 lead with 53 seconds remaining in the game. It's also known as "The Shot."

Breen described the play thus: Irving and Curry one on one, Irving puts it up, It's Good! Kyrie Irving from downtown! And the Cavaliers by three!

Before Kyrie Irving's three-point field goal, both teams were tied at 699 points scored apiece in this series. Immediately after Irving's three-pointer, Golden State brought the ball up-court, opting not to call a timeout, and although Golden State got a preferred switch and matchup of Curry on Kevin Love, Love made arguably "the biggest defensive stop of the entire NBA season", and forced Curry into a contested three-pointer, which he missed. After LeBron James hurt his right wrist on a dunk attempt in which he was fouled by Draymond Green, he virtually clinched the title for the Cavaliers by making one of two free throws, putting them four points ahead with only 10.6 seconds left in the game. The Cavaliers fouled Draymond Green with 6.5 seconds remaining. Stephen Curry received the ensuing inbounds pass, pump faked, and shot a three-pointer over Cavaliers guard Iman Shumpert. The attempt missed, and was rebounded by Marreese Speights of the Warriors who then missed a three-point attempt as time expired. Draymond Green put up his best performance of the Finals, leading all scorers with 32 points, including 6-of-8 from three-point range to go along with 15 rebounds and nine assists. Stephen Curry and Klay Thompson added 17 and 14 points, respectively. LeBron James led all Cavaliers with 27 points and became only the third player ever in NBA history to record a triple double in an NBA Finals Game 7 by adding 11 assists and 11 rebounds. Kyrie Irving added 26 points for Cleveland.

The Cavaliers became the first team in NBA history to come back from a 3–1 series deficit to win the NBA Finals. They became the first NBA Champion to clinch all their playoff series on the road since the 1999 San Antonio Spurs, as well as the first road team to win a Finals Game 7 since the 1978 Washington Bullets. The Cavaliers won their first championship in franchise history, ending a 52-year pro sports championship drought for the city of Cleveland (whose previous victory was when the 1964 Cleveland Browns defeated the Baltimore Colts in the NFL Championship Game), as well as 26-year drought for the State of Ohio (whose previous championship was when the 1990 Cincinnati Reds defeated the Oakland Athletics in the World Series). LeBron James was named the unanimous Finals MVP, becoming only the fifth player in NBA history to earn the award three times or more. He also was the overall leader in points, rebounds, assists, steals, and blocks during the series, a feat that had never been accomplished in an NBA playoff series. Tyronn Lue became the 14th coach to win an NBA championship as a head coach and player.

This marked the first time an NBA Finals went to a Game 7 under the 2–2–1–1–1 format since it was reinstated in 2014. This was also the most watched Game 7 in NBA history.

The end of Game 7 garnered 337,000 tweets per minute, the top-tweeted moment in Finals history and most-tweeted U.S. sports event in 2016. On July 13, Game 7 of the 2016 NBA Finals received the 2016 ESPY award for Best Game.

This was the last Game 7 of the NBA Finals until 2025.

== Rosters ==
=== Cleveland Cavaliers ===
2015–16 Cleveland Cavaliers roster
Players

Pos.	No.	Player	Height	Weight	DOB	From
G	8	Matthew Dellavedova	6 ft 4 in (1.93 m)	198 lb (90 kg)	1990–09–08	Saint Mary's
F/C	9	Channing Frye	6 ft 11 in (2.11 m)	255 lb (116 kg)	1983–05–17	Arizona
G	2	Kyrie Irving	6 ft 3 in (1.91 m)	193 lb (88 kg)	1992–03–23	Duke
F	23	LeBron James	6 ft 9.5 in (2.07 m)	250 lb (113 kg)	1984–12–30	St. Vincent–St. Mary HS (OH)
F	24	Richard Jefferson	6 ft 7 in (2.01 m)	233 lb (106 kg)	1980–06–21	Arizona
G/F	30	Dahntay Jones	6 ft 6 in (1.98 m)	225 lb (102 kg)	1980–12–27	Duke
G/F	1	James Jones	6 ft 8 in (2.03 m)	218 lb (99 kg)	1980–10–04	Miami (FL)
C	14	Sasha Kaun	6 ft 11 in (2.11 m)	260 lb (118 kg)	1985–05–08	Kansas
F/C	0	Kevin Love	6 ft 8 in (2.03 m)	251 lb (114 kg)	1988–09–07	UCLA
G	12	Jordan McRae	6 ft 5 in (1.96 m)	179 lb (81 kg)	1991–03–28	Tennessee
C	20	Timofey Mozgov	7 ft 1 in (2.16 m)	275 lb (125 kg)	1986–07–16	Russia
G	4	Iman Shumpert	6 ft 5 in (1.96 m)	220 lb (100 kg)	1990–06–26	Georgia Tech
G/F	5	J. R. Smith	6 ft 6 in (1.98 m)	225 lb (102 kg)	1985–09–09	St. Benedict's Prep (NJ)
F/C	13	Tristan Thompson	6 ft 9 in (2.06 m)	238 lb (108 kg)	1991–03–13	Texas
G	52	Mo Williams	6 ft 1 in (1.85 m)	198 lb (90 kg)	1982–12–19	Alabama

Coaches
Head coach
- Tyronn Lue
Assistant(s)
- Jim Boylan
- Bret Brielmaier
- Larry Drew
- Damon Jones
- Mike Longabardi
- James Posey
- Phil Handy (player development)
- Vitaly Potapenko (player development)

Legend
- (DP) Unsigned draft pick
- (FA) Free agent
- (S) Suspended
- (DL) On assignment to D-League affiliate
- Injured

Roster
Updated: April 13, 2016

=== Golden State Warriors ===
2015–16 Golden State Warriors roster
Players

Pos.	No.	Player	Height	Weight	DOB	From
G	19	Leandro Barbosa	6 ft 3 in (1.91 m)	194 lb (88 kg)	1982–11–28	Brazil
F	40	Harrison Barnes	6 ft 8 in (2.03 m)	225 lb (102 kg)	1992–05–30	North Carolina
C	12	Andrew Bogut	7 ft 0 in (2.13 m)	260 lb (118 kg)	1984–11–28	Utah
G	21	Ian Clark	6 ft 3 in (1.91 m)	175 lb (79 kg)	1991–03–07	Belmont
G	30	Stephen Curry	6 ft 2 in (1.88 m)	190 lb (86 kg)	1988–03–14	Davidson
C	31	Festus Ezeli	6 ft 11 in (2.11 m)	265 lb (120 kg)	1989–10–21	Vanderbilt
F	23	Draymond Green	6 ft 7 in (2.01 m)	230 lb (104 kg)	1990–03–04	Michigan State
G/F	9	Andre Iguodala	6 ft 6 in (1.98 m)	215 lb (98 kg)	1984–01–28	Arizona
G	34	Shaun Livingston	6 ft 7 in (2.01 m)	192 lb (87 kg)	1985–09–11	Peoria Central HS (IL)
F	36	Kevon Looney	6 ft 9 in (2.06 m)	220 lb (100 kg)	1996–02–06	UCLA
F	20	James Michael McAdoo	6 ft 9 in (2.06 m)	240 lb (109 kg)	1993–01–04	North Carolina
G/F	4	Brandon Rush	6 ft 6 in (1.98 m)	220 lb (100 kg)	1985–07–07	Kansas
F/C	5	Marreese Speights	6 ft 10 in (2.08 m)	255 lb (116 kg)	1987–08–04	Florida
G	11	Klay Thompson	6 ft 7 in (2.01 m)	215 lb (98 kg)	1990–02–08	Washington State
F/C	18	Anderson Varejão	6 ft 11 in (2.11 m)	273 lb (124 kg)	1982–09–28	Brazil

Coaches
Head coach
- Steve Kerr
Assistant(s)
- Ron Adams
- Jarron Collins
- Luke Walton
- Bruce Fraser (player development)

Legend
- (DP) Unsigned draft pick
- (FA) Free agent
- (S) Suspended
- (DL) On assignment to D-League affiliate
- Injured

Roster
Updated: June 14, 2016

== Player statistics ==
Legend
GP	Games played	GS	Games started	MPG	Minutes per game
FG%	Field-goal percentage	3P%	3-point field-goal percentage	FT%	Free-throw percentage
RPG	Rebounds per game	APG	Assists per game	SPG	Steals per game
BPG	Blocks per game	PPG	Points per game

Cleveland Cavaliers

Cleveland Cavaliers statistics
Player	GP	GS	MPG	FG%	3P%	FT%	RPG	APG	SPG	BPG	PPG
Matthew Dellavedova	6	0	7.6	.263	.167	.833	0.5	1.0	0.0	0.0	2.7
Channing Frye	4	0	8.3	.000	.000	1.000	0.8	0.0	0.0	0.5	0.5
Kyrie Irving	7	7	39.0	.468	.405	.939	3.9	3.9	2.1	0.7	27.1
LeBron James	7	7	41.7	.494	.371	.721	11.3	8.9	2.6	2.3	29.7
Richard Jefferson	7	2	24.0	.516	.167	.636	5.3	0.4	1.3	0.1	5.7
Dahntay Jones	6	0	3.0	.500	.000	.800	0.3	0.0	0.0	0.2	1.3
James Jones	5	0	4.0	.000	.000	.250	0.4	0.4	0.0	0.0	0.2
Kevin Love	6	5	26.3	.362	.263	.706	6.8	1.3	0.7	0.3	8.5
Jordan McRae	1	0	3.0	1.000	.000	.000	1.0	0.0	0.0	0.0	4.0
Timofey Mozgov	5	0	5.0	.333	.000	.750	1.6	0.0	0.6	0.2	1.4
Iman Shumpert	7	0	18.3	.304	.267	1.000	1.6	0.1	0.1	0.3	3.0
J. R. Smith	7	7	37.3	.400	.356	.667	2.7	1.6	1.4	0.3	10.6
Tristan Thompson	7	7	32.3	.636	.000	.533	10.1	0.7	0.3	0.9	10.3
Mo Williams	6	0	4.8	.333	.200	.000	0.5	0.2	0.5	0.0	1.5

Golden State Warriors

Golden State Warriors statistics
Player	GP	GS	MPG	FG%	3P%	FT%	RPG	APG	SPG	BPG	PPG
Leandro Barbosa	6	0	13.1	.643	.500	.727	1.0	0.8	0.5	0.2	8.2
Harrison Barnes	7	7	31.7	.352	.310	.600	4.4	1.4	0.7	0.4	9.3
Andrew Bogut	5	5	12.0	.471	.000	.000	3.0	0.6	0.4	2.0	3.2
Ian Clark	4	0	4.8	.625	.600	.000	0.8	0.5	0.0	0.0	3.3
Stephen Curry	7	7	35.1	.403	.400	.929	4.9	3.7	0.9	0.7	22.6
Festus Ezeli	7	1	8.6	.300	.000	.500	1.9	0.4	0.1	0.1	2.0
Draymond Green	6	6	40.0	.486	.406	.783	10.3	6.3	1.7	1.0	16.5
Andre Iguodala	7	2	34.1	.466	.304	.333	6.3	4.1	0.9	0.7	9.1
Shaun Livingston	7	0	21.1	.511	.000	.857	3.4	2.9	0.3	0.3	8.3
James Michael McAdoo	3	0	6.1	1.000	.000	.000	1.3	0.3	0.0	0.0	1.3
Brandon Rush	1	0	5.5	.000	.000	.500	1.0	0.0	0.4	0.2	0.2
Marreese Speights	7	0	4.7	.222	.400	1.000	1.3	0.3	0.1	0.3	2.0
Klay Thompson	7	7	35.3	.427	.350	.786	3.0	1.9	1.0	0.6	19.6
Anderson Varejão	6	0	6.9	.000	.000	.500	1.3	1.0	0.2	0.0	1.2

== Broadcast ==
In the United States, the NBA Finals aired on ABC (and for the second consecutive year on local affiliates WEWS-TV in Cleveland and KGO-TV in San Francisco/Oakland) with Mike Breen as play-by-play commentator, and Mark Jackson and Jeff Van Gundy serving as color commentators. TNT's Craig Sager made an appearance for Game 6 as a sideline reporter, his first appearance at the NBA Finals, and his last game before he died later in December. ESPN Radio aired it as well and had Kevin Calabro and Hubie Brown as commentators. ESPN Deportes provided exclusive Spanish-language coverage of The Finals, with a commentary team of Álvaro Martín and Carlos Morales.

Television ratings
Game	Ratings (households)	American audience (in millions)
1	11.1	19.20
2	9.8	17.49
3	9.7	16.47
4	9.8	16.57
5	11.8	20.53
6	11.8	20.70
7	15.8	31.02
Avg	11.4	20.28

== Aftermath ==
Before leaving the arena after the Game 7 loss, Draymond Green sat in his car and made a phone call to general manager Bob Myers to urge him to try and sign pending free-agent Kevin Durant. After hanging up with Myers, Green then called Durant to gauge his interest in coming to Golden State and Durant told him he was "on his way". Two weeks later, Durant would infamously leave the Oklahoma City Thunder, the team who nearly beat the Warriors a month prior in the Western Conference Finals, to join the 73-win Warriors and form the league's latest superteam. Upon signing, Durant would receive backlash for joining such a stacked team, as many perceived it would hurt the competitiveness of the league. Durant replaced forward Harrison Barnes, who struggled throughout the playoffs, and signed a four-year, $94 million contract with the Dallas Mavericks that offseason.

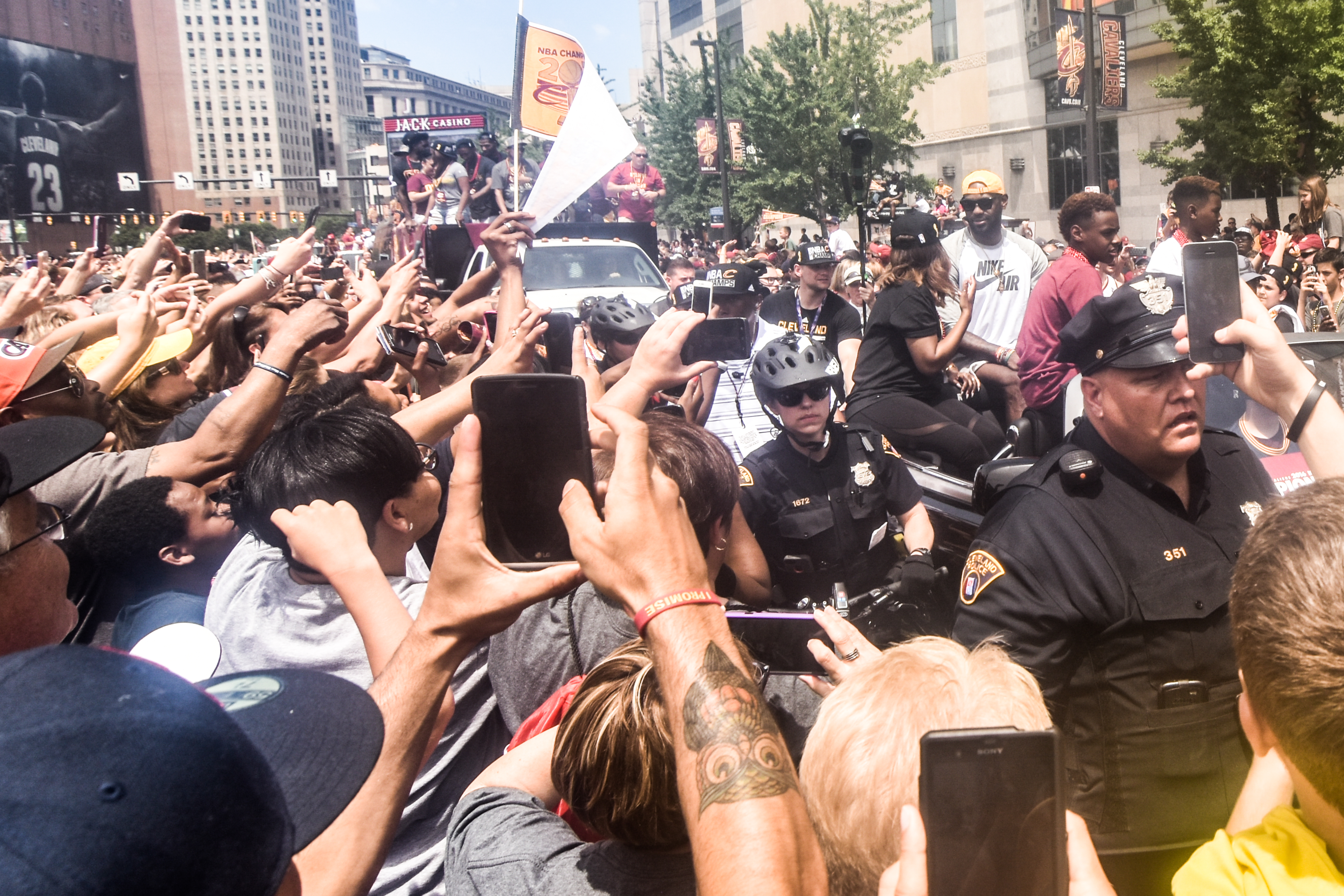
LeBron James during the Cavs victory parade.

The 2016 Cleveland Cavaliers championship parade was held on June 22, 2016. An estimated 1.3 million people attended the, then-largest, NBA championship parade in history. Cleveland Browns Hall of Fame running back and Civil Rights activist Jim Brown attended the parade. Cavs play-by-play announcer Fred McLeod narrated the scene to the crowd, stating the moment was like Brown "passing the torch" to James in terms of Cleveland sports icons.

The Cavaliers and Warriors also met in the following two NBA Finals, the first time in any of North America's four major professional sports leagues that the same two teams met for the championship four years in a row. The Warriors, with the added boost of the addition of Durant in the 2016 offseason, defeated the Cavaliers in five games in 2017 and swept them in 2018. Durant was named the Finals' MVP in both series.

The Warriors made it to a fifth consecutive Finals in 2019, which they would lose to the Toronto Raptors in six games. Three years later, they made it to their sixth Finals in eight seasons and defeated the Boston Celtics in six games.

James left the Cavaliers in the 2018 offseason to join the Los Angeles Lakers. He would lead the Lakers to a title in 2020 and win Finals MVP that year. Also on the 2020 Lakers was 2016 Cavs starting guard J.R. Smith as a bench player.

Despite their dust up that led to Draymond Green's pivotal suspension in Game 5, James and Green would become good friends off the court in the years afterwards. In 2019, Green signed with Klutch Sports, an agency led by LeBron James’ best friend and agent, Rich Paul. Green would later admit he cost the Warriors the Finals with his suspension.

This was the first championship won by an Ohio-based team since 1990, when the Cincinnati Reds won their fifth and most recent World Series title. The win by the Cavaliers remains, as of 2026, the only professional sports championship won in the city of Cleveland in the 21st century. LeBron James, Richard Jefferson, and Kevin Love cheered on the Cleveland Indians in Game 7 of the 2016 World Series against the Chicago Cubs, but Cleveland lost the game in extra-innings.

=== In popular culture ===
The Block by James on Iguodala was referenced by Nicki Minaj in the song Do You Mind, which she was featured in later that summer. Minaj raps, "Any baller tryna score, check them shot clocks/But I hit 'em with them 'Bron Iguodala blocks."

== See also ==
- Death Lineup
- Cavaliers–Warriors rivalry
- Cleveland sports curse
- The Block
