= Bulls–Cavaliers rivalry =

National Basketball Association rivalry

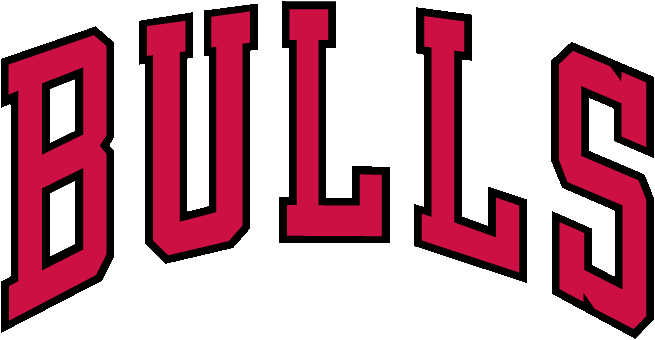
- Chicago Bulls Cleveland Cavaliers
- First meeting: December 20, 1970; Bulls 116, Cavaliers 103
- Latest meeting: March 19, 2026; Cavaliers 115, Bulls 110
- Next meeting: November 16, 2026

Statistics
- Total meetings: 276
- All-time series: 155–121 (CHI)
- Regular season series: 134–107 (CHI)
- Postseason results: 20–14 (CHI)
- Longest win streak: CHI W13
- Current win streak: CLE W1

Postseason history
- 1988 Eastern Conference First Round: Bulls won, 3–2; 1989 Eastern Conference First Round: Bulls won, 3–2; 1992 Eastern Conference Finals: Bulls won, 4–2; 1993 Eastern Conference Semifinals: Bulls won, 4–0; 1994 Eastern Conference First Round: Bulls won, 3–0; 2010 Eastern Conference First Round: Cavaliers won, 4–1; 2015 Eastern Conference Semifinals: Cavaliers won, 4–2

Locations of the Chicago Bulls and Cleveland Cavaliers.

The Bulls–Cavaliers rivalry is a National Basketball Association (NBA) rivalry between the Chicago Bulls and the Cleveland Cavaliers. The teams have played each other since the Cavaliers joined the NBA as an expansion team in 1970, but the rivalry did not begin in earnest until the Bulls drafted Michael Jordan with the third overall pick in 1984. After Jordan would go on to the Washington Wizards and eventually retire, the rivalry died down, but when Cleveland picked LeBron James with the first selection in 2003, the rivalry heated up again.

In 2011, Bleacher Report named the Bulls as the Cavaliers' "Greatest Rivalry." The NBA called it "one of the great NBA rivalries."

== The Michael Jordan era ==
Chicago had the third selection in the 1984 NBA draft, and selected Michael Jordan out of North Carolina. Jordan won the NBA Rookie of the Year Award in 1985 and led the Bulls to a 38–44 record and the seventh seed in the Eastern Conference. As for Cleveland, they had a 36–46 record, just a single seed under Chicago with the eighth seed. The Cavaliers wouldn't play the Bulls in the playoffs until 1988, which the Bulls would win, 3–2.

=== The Shot ===
Back when the first round was best-of-5 instead of best-of-7, it was game 5 of the First Round in 1989, on May 7, Jordan hit what is known today as "The Shot" even with Cleveland sweeping Chicago in the season, it wasn't enough to get by Jordan's shot to win and play the Knicks the next round. Craig Ehlo was the player Jordan shot over to win the game. The Cavaliers wouldn't play the Bulls in the playoffs until the 1992 Eastern Conference Finals, which Chicago would win yet again 4–2. The Shot is remembered by Cleveland fans as part of the Cleveland sports curse, along with The Drive, The Fumble and Red Right 88.

A sequel to "The Shot" occurred at the end of Game 4 of the 1993 Eastern Conference Semifinals, again with Jordan hitting a series-winning shot on the same end of the Richfield Coliseum floor as in 1989. The Bulls swept the Cavaliers en route to their third consecutive title. Then in the 1994 First Round, the Bulls again swept the Cavaliers despite Jordan retiring for the first time the previous autumn.

A notable regular season moment between the two teams took place on March 28, 1990, at the Richfield Coliseum. In the Bulls' 117–113 overtime win over the Cavaliers, Jordan scored a career-high 69 points along with 18 rebounds, six assists and four steals, while playing all but three minutes in the game.

The Bulls would win six NBA championships with Jordan and his partner Scottie Pippen, and 3 of those championships with Dennis Rodman.

== The LeBron James era ==
The Cleveland Cavaliers were dominated by the Bulls in the rivalry, even with likes of Mark Price, Steve Kerr, Ron Harper and others playing the franchise, Jordan was too much to handle and adding Scottie Pippen made it even more difficult on the Cavaliers, but Jordan would eventually retire and Pippen was traded to the Houston Rockets. Cleveland would have the first pick in the 2003 NBA draft and used that selection to pick LeBron James. The Cavaliers would take over the rivalry with LeBron, Chicago would pick a hometown player with the first pick as well in Derrick Rose. However, Rose had an injury in the playoffs against Philadelphia that would deter Rose's promising career that won him the MVP in 2011. Both teams met up in the first round in 2010, and Cleveland won their first ever series against Chicago, 4–1. They would play again in 2015 which Cleveland won again, 4–2.

=== Bulls' resurgence ===
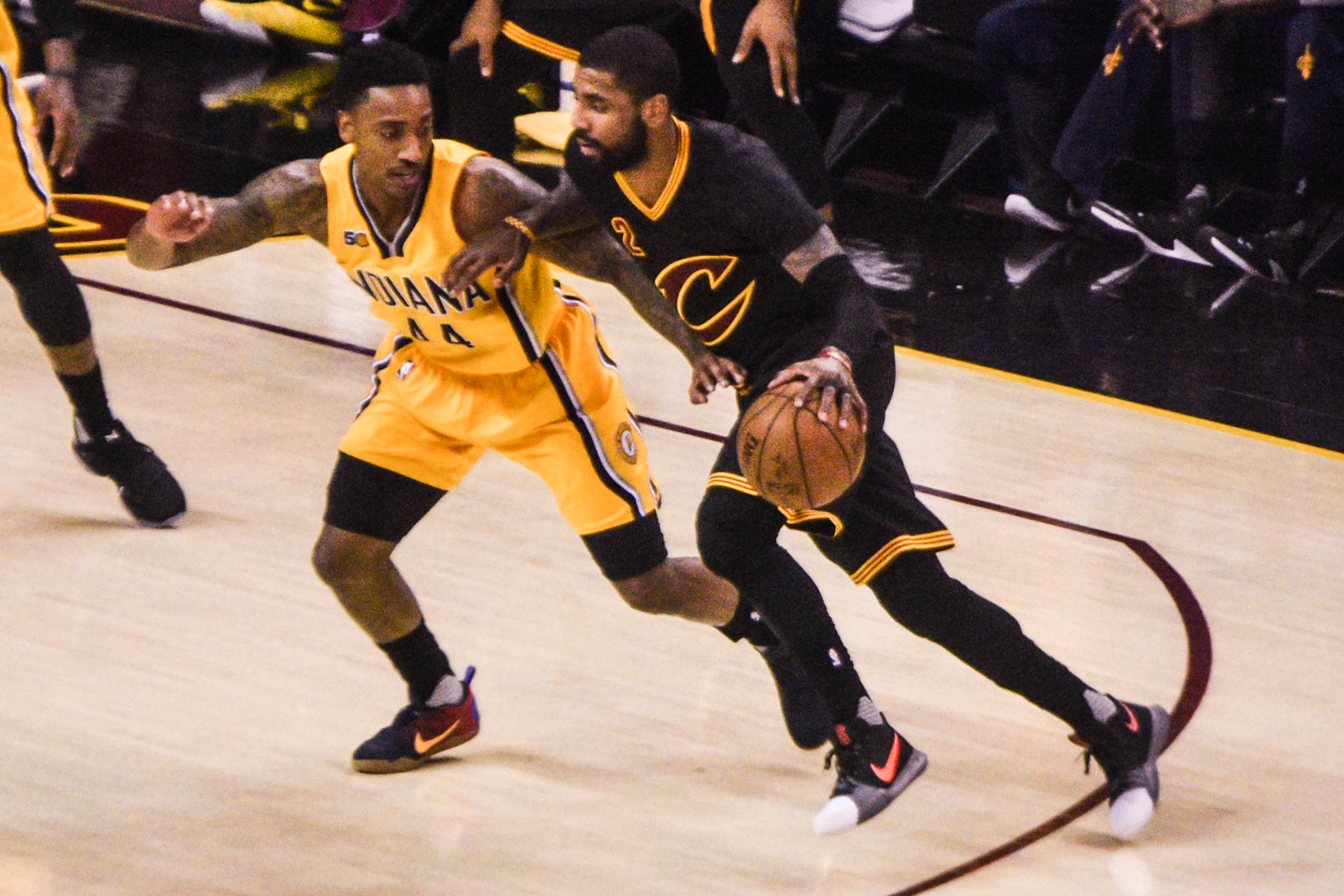
The Cavaliers drafted Irving first overall in 2011.

In the summer of 2010, Cavaliers superstar LeBron James became a free agent, and announced on ESPN that he would join the Miami Heat, to join Chris Bosh and Dwyane Wade. Cleveland's first season without James was an awful year, finishing with a record of 19–63. Meanwhile, the Bulls finished 62–20 and earned the first seed in the Eastern Conference playoffs; Derrick Rose would win the NBA MVP. However, the Bulls lost in the Eastern Conference finals against the Miami Heat, who would lose in the NBA Finals against the Dallas Mavericks. Cleveland would draft Duke point guard Kyrie Irving with the first pick and Texas center Tristan Thompson with the fourth pick in the 2011 NBA draft. Irving would win the Rookie of the Year Award. However, the Cavaliers' best season without James was when they finished 33–49 in 2013–14.

=== Return of LeBron James, 2015 semifinals rematch ===
On July 11, 2014, James announced his return to Cleveland in a letter published to Sports Illustrated. The Cavaliers would select Andrew Wiggins in 2014 first overall, who they would trade along with Anthony Bennett to the Minnesota Timberwolves in exchange for Kevin Love. Both the Bulls and Cavaliers would qualify to play in the playoffs.

The Cavaliers earned the Eastern Conference's second seed, and the Bulls earned the third seed. The teams would play each other in the Eastern Conference semi-finals. Chicago won game 1 with Derrick Rose scoring 25 points. Cleveland won game 2 with James scoring 33 points. Chicago won game 3, as Derrick Rose made a shot as time expired. Cleveland won game 4, as James also made a shot as time expired. The Cavaliers would also win games 5 and 6 to eliminate the Bulls, and advanced to play in the 2015 NBA Finals, where they would lose to the Golden State Warriors in 6 games. The Cavaliers played Golden State in the NBA Finals again the next year and came back from a 3–1 series deficit to end the 52-year championship drought in Cleveland.

== LeBron leaves again, both teams start rebuilds ==
During the 2017 NBA draft the Bulls traded all-star Jimmy Butler to the Minnesota Timberwolves in exchange for the 7th overall pick (used to pick Lauri Markkanen), Zach LaVine and Kris Dunn to start a rebuild for the Bulls. Meanwhile, for Cleveland they traded superstar Kyrie Irving (upon request) to the Boston Celtics in exchange for Isaiah Thomas, Jae Crowder, Ante Žižić and the Brooklyn Nets first round draft pick, later used for Alabama star Collin Sexton. Towards the beginning of the season there was rumors of LeBron possibly leaving Cleveland again in free agency. The Cavaliers finished with a record of 50–32 and earned the 4th seed. Meanwhile, for Chicago they finished with 27–55. The Cavaliers beat the fifth seeded Pacers, first seeded Raptors, and second seeded Celtics to make their fourth straight finals appearance. However they would fall to Golden State led by Kevin Durant and Stephen Curry again, this time getting swept. The 2018 NBA draft came with possible big NBA stars, and Chicago took Wendell Carter Jr. with their 7th pick, and Cleveland took Collin Sexton straight afterwards with the 8th pick. The LeBron rumors for Cleveland would turn out to be true, as he signed a 4-year $154 million deal with the Lakers. Both Cleveland and Chicago entered the rebuilding stages, with Cleveland returning the playoffs beginning 2023 and the Bulls making the 2022 playoffs.

On January 2, 2023, the Cavaliers' Donovan Mitchell scored 71 points against the Bulls for the highest scoring performance since Kobe Bryant's 81-point game in 2006 and leading the Cavaliers past a 21-point deficit to an overtime win.

The Cavaliers and Bulls faced-off under East Group C in the 2024 NBA Cup, with the Cavaliers winning the group stage game on November 15 with a score of 144–126. With both teams eventually finishing the group stage with a 2–2 record, this game secured the head-to-head tiebreaker for the Cavaliers to place 3rd and the Bulls 4th in such group, which was won by the Atlanta Hawks.

On July 6, 2025, during the offseason, the Bulls and Cavaliers agreed to a trade that sent Lonzo Ball to the Cavaliers in exchange for Isaac Okoro.

== Season-by-season results ==
Chicago Bulls vs. Cleveland Cavaliers Season-by-Season Results
1970s (Bulls, 26–12)

| Season | Season series | | at Chicago Bulls | at Cleveland Cavaliers | Overall series | Notes |
|---|---|---|---|---|---|---|
| 1970–71 | Bulls | 4–0 | Bulls, 2–0 | Bulls, 2–0 | Bulls, 4–0 | Cleveland Cavaliers joined the NBA as an expansion team. |
| 1971–72 | Bulls | 4–0 | Bulls, 2–0 | Bulls, 2–0 | Bulls, 8–0 | |
| 1972–73 | Bulls | 3–1 | Bulls, 2–0 | Tie, 1–1 | Bulls, 11–1 | Bulls win 10 games in a row (1970-1973). |
| 1973–74 | Bulls | 4–0 | Bulls, 2–0 | Bulls, 2–0 | Bulls, 15–1 | Final season Cavaliers played at Cleveland Arena. |
| 1974–75 | Tie | 2–2 | Tie, 1–1 | Tie, 1–1 | Bulls, 17–3 | Cavaliers open up Coliseum at Richfield. |
| 1975–76 | Cavaliers | 4–0 | Cavaliers, 2–0 | Cavaliers, 2–0 | Bulls, 17–7 | Cavaliers sweep season series for the first time. |
| 1976–77 | Bulls | 3–1 | Bulls, 2–0 | Tie, 1–1 | Bulls, 20–8 | |
| 1977–78 | Bulls | 3–1 | Bulls, 2–0 | Tie, 1–1 | Bulls, 23–9 | |
| 1978–79 | Cavaliers | 3–1 | Tie, 1–1 | Cavaliers, 2–0 | Bulls, 24–12 | |
| 1979–80 | Bulls | 2–0 | Bulls; 126–117 | Bulls; 123–117 | Bulls, 26–12 | Only season where the Bulls and Cavaliers played twice. |

1980s (Bulls, 41–28)

| Season | Season series | | at Chicago Bulls | at Cleveland Cavaliers | Overall series | Notes |
|---|---|---|---|---|---|---|
| 1980–81 | Bulls | 5–1 | Bulls, 2–1 | Bulls, 3–0 | Bulls, 31–13 | Bulls move to the Eastern Conference and are placed in the Central Division, resulting in the matchups between the Cavaliers a divisional rivalry. |
| 1981–82 | Bulls | 5–1 | Bulls, 3–0 | Bulls, 2–1 | Bulls, 36–14 | |
| 1982–83 | Bulls | 5–1 | Bulls, 2–1 | Bulls, 3–0 | Bulls, 41–15 | |
| 1983–84 | Cavaliers | 4–2 | Cavaliers, 2–1 | Cavaliers, 2–1 | Bulls, 43–19 | |
| 1984–85 | Cavaliers | 4–2 | Bulls, 2–1 | Cavaliers, 3–0 | Bulls, 45–23 | Michael Jordan makes his debut for the Bulls. |
| 1985–86 | Tie | 3–3 | Bulls, 2–1 | Cavaliers, 2–1 | Bulls, 48–26 | |
| 1986–87 | Bulls | 5–1 | Bulls, 3–0 | Bulls, 2–1 | Bulls, 53–27 | |
| 1987–88 | Tie | 3–3 | Bulls, 2–1 | Cavaliers, 2–1 | Bulls, 56–30 | |
| 1988 Eastern Conference First Round | Bulls | 3–2 | Bulls, 3–0 | Cavaliers, 2–0 | Bulls, 59–32 | 1st postseason series. |
| 1988–89 | Cavaliers | 6–0 | Cavaliers, 3–0 | Cavaliers, 3–0 | Bulls, 59–38 | |
| 1989 Eastern Conference First Round | Bulls | 3–2 | Tie, 1–1 | Bulls, 2–1 | Bulls, 62–40 | 2nd postseason series. |
| 1989–90 | Bulls | 5–0 | Bulls, 3–0 | Bulls, 2–0 | Bulls; 67–40 | |

1990s (Bulls, 34–22)

| Season | Season series | | at Chicago Bulls | at Cleveland Cavaliers | Overall series | Notes |
|---|---|---|---|---|---|---|
| 1990–91 | Bulls | 5–0 | Bulls, 2–0 | Bulls, 3–0 | Bulls; 72–40 | Bulls win 1991 NBA Finals. |
| 1991–92 | Bulls | 3–2 | Bulls, 2–1 | Tie, 1–1 | Bulls; 75–42 | Bulls finish with the best record in the league (67–15). Bulls win 13 in a row (1989-1992). |
| 1992 Eastern Conference Finals | Bulls | 4–2 | Bulls, 2–1 | Bulls, 2–1 | Bulls, 79–44 | 3rd postseason series. Bulls would go on to win 1992 NBA Finals. |
| 1992–93 | Cavaliers | 3–2 | Tie, 1–1 | Cavaliers, 2–1 | Bulls, 81–47 | |
| 1993 Eastern Conference Semifinals | Bulls | 4–0 | Bulls, 2–0 | Bulls, 2–0 | Bulls, 85–47 | 4th postseason series. Bulls would go on to win 1993 NBA Finals. |
| 1993–94 | Cavaliers | 3–1 | Tie, 1–1 | Cavaliers, 2–0 | Bulls, 86–50 | Michael Jordan leaves the Bulls in the offseason. Final season the Cavaliers played at Richfield Coliseum. Final season the Bulls played at Chicago Stadium. |
| 1994 Eastern Conference First Round | Bulls | 3–0 | Bulls, 2–0 | Bulls, 1–0 | Bulls, 89–50 | 5th postseason series. |
| 1994–95 | Cavaliers | 3–2 | Bulls, 2–1 | Cavaliers, 2–0 | Bulls, 91–53 | Midway through the season, Michael Jordan rejoins the Bulls. Cavaliers open up Gund Arena (now known as Rocket Mortgage FieldHouse). Bulls open up United Center. |
| 1995–96 | Bulls | 4–0 | Bulls, 2–0 | Bulls, 2–0 | Bulls, 95–53 | Bulls finish with the best record in the league and also set a record for most wins in a season at the time (72–10) (Broken by the 2015 73–9 Warriors). Bulls win 1996 NBA Finals. |
| 1996–97 | Bulls | 3–1 | Bulls, 2–0 | Tie, 1–1 | Bulls, 98–54 | Bulls finish with the best record in the league (69–13). Bulls win 1997 NBA Finals. |
| 1997–98 | Tie | 2–2 | Bulls, 2–0 | Cavaliers, 2–0 | Bulls, 100–56 | Bulls record their 100th win over the Cavaliers. Last season Michael Jordan played for the Bulls. Bulls win 1998 NBA Finals. |
| 1998–99 | Cavaliers | 3–0 | Cavaliers, 2–0 | Cavaliers, 1–0 | Bulls, 100–59 | Due to a lockout, only three games were played this season. |
| 1999–2000 | Cavaliers | 3–1 | Cavaliers, 2–0 | Tie, 1–1 | Bulls, 101–62 | |

2000s (Cavaliers, 23–17)

| Season | Season series | | at Chicago Bulls | at Cleveland Cavaliers | Overall series | Notes |
|---|---|---|---|---|---|---|
| 2000–01 | Cavaliers | 3–1 | Tie, 1–1 | Cavaliers, 2–0 | Bulls, 102–65 | |
| 2001–02 | Cavaliers | 3–1 | Tie, 1–1 | Cavaliers, 2–0 | Bulls, 103–68 | |
| 2002–03 | Bulls | 3–1 | Bulls, 2–0 | Tie, 1–1 | Bulls, 106–69 | |
| 2003–04 | Tie | 2–2 | Tie, 1–1 | Tie, 1–1 | Bulls, 108–71 | LeBron James makes his debut for the Cavaliers. |
| 2004–05 | Tie | 2–2 | Bulls, 2–0 | Cavaliers, 2–0 | Bulls, 110–73 | |
| 2005–06 | Cavaliers | 4–0 | Cavaliers, 2–0 | Cavaliers, 2–0 | Bulls, 110–77 | |
| 2006–07 | Tie | 2–2 | Tie, 1–1 | Tie, 1–1 | Bulls, 112–79 | Cavaliers lose 2007 NBA Finals. |
| 2007–08 | Bulls | 3–1 | Bulls, 2–0 | Tie, 1–1 | Bulls, 115–80 | |
| 2008–09 | Cavaliers | 3–1 | Tie, 1–1 | Cavaliers, 2–0 | Bulls, 116–83 | Cavaliers finish with the best record in the league (66–16). |
| 2009–10 | Tie | 2–2 | Tie, 1–1 | Tie, 1–1 | Bulls, 118–85 | Cavaliers finish with the best record in the league (61–21). |

2010s (Bulls, 30–20)

| Season | Season series | | at Chicago Bulls | at Cleveland Cavaliers | Overall series | Notes |
|---|---|---|---|---|---|---|
| 2010 Eastern Conference First Round | Cavaliers | 4–1 | Tie, 1–1 | Cavaliers, 3–0 | Bulls, 119–89 | 6th postseason series. Cavaliers win the series for the first time. |
| 2010–11 | Bulls | 4–0 | Bulls, 2–0 | Bulls, 2–0 | Bulls, 123–89 | Lebron James leaves the Cavaliers to join the Miami Heat. Bulls finish with the best record in the league (62–20). |
| 2011–12 | Bulls | 3–0 | Bulls, 1–0 | Bulls, 2–0 | Bulls, 126–89 | Due to a lockout, only three games were played this season. Bulls finish tied with the best record in the league (50–16). |
| 2012–13 | Bulls | 3–1 | Tie, 1–1 | Bulls, 2–0 | Bulls, 129–90 | |
| 2013–14 | Bulls | 3–1 | Bulls, 2–0 | Tie, 1–1 | Bulls, 132–91 | |
| 2014–15 | Cavaliers | 3–1 | Tie, 1–1 | Cavaliers, 2–0 | Bulls, 133–94 | LeBron James rejoins the Cavaliers. |
| 2015 Eastern Conference Semifinals | Cavaliers | 4–2 | Cavaliers, 2–1 | Cavaliers, 2–1 | Bulls, 135–98 | 7th postseason series. Cavaliers would go on to lose 2015 NBA Finals. |
| 2015–16 | Bulls | 3–1 | Bulls, 2–0 | Tie, 1–1 | Bulls, 138–99 | Cavaliers win 2016 NBA Finals. |
| 2016–17 | Bulls | 4–0 | Bulls, 2–0 | Bulls, 2–0 | Bulls, 142–99 | Cavaliers lose 2017 NBA Finals. |
| 2017–18 | Cavaliers | 4–0 | Cavaliers, 2–0 | Cavaliers, 2–0 | Bulls, 142–103 | Cavaliers record their 100th win over the Bulls. Cavaliers lose 2018 NBA Finals. Last season LeBron James played for the Cavaliers. |
| 2018–19 | Bulls | 3–1 | Tie, 1–1 | Bulls, 2–0 | Bulls, 145–104 | |
| 2019–20 | Bulls | 3–1 | Bulls, 2–0 | Tie, 1–1 | Bulls, 148–105 | |

2020s (Cavaliers, 16–7)

| Season | Season series | | at Chicago Bulls | at Cleveland Cavaliers | Overall series | Notes |
|---|---|---|---|---|---|---|
| 2020–21 | Cavaliers | 2–1 | Tie, 1–1 | Cavaliers, 1–0 | Bulls, 149–107 | Due to the COVID-19 pandemic, only three games were played this season. |
| 2021–22 | Bulls | 3–1 | Bulls, 2–0 | Tie, 1–1 | Bulls, 152–108 | |
| 2022–23 | Cavaliers | 4–0 | Cavaliers, 2–0 | Cavaliers, 2–0 | Bulls, 152–112 | |
| 2023–24 | Cavaliers | 3–1 | Tie, 1–1 | Cavaliers, 2–0 | Bulls, 153–115 | |
| 2024–25 | Cavaliers | 4–0 | Cavaliers, 2–0 | Cavaliers, 2–0 | Bulls, 153–119 | On November 15, 2024, at Cleveland, the Cavaliers beat the Bulls 144–126 during the 2024 NBA Cup group stage. This game secured the tiebreaker for the Cavaliers to place higher in East Group C. |
| 2025–26 | Tie | 2–2 | Tie, 1–1 | Tie, 1–1 | Bulls, 155–121 | |
| 2026–27 | Tie | 0-0 | November 16th, 2026 and March 20th, 2027 | November 23rd and December 3rd, 2026 | Bulls, 155–121 | |

Summary of Results

| Season | Season series | | at Chicago Bulls | at Cleveland Cavaliers | Notes |
|---|---|---|---|---|---|
| Regular season games | Bulls | 135–107 | Bulls, 80–43 | Cavaliers, 63–56 | |
| Postseason games | Bulls | 20–14 | Bulls, 12–5 | Cavaliers, 9–8 | |
| Postseason series | Bulls | 5–2 | Tie, 1–1 | Bulls, 4–1 | Eastern Conference First Round: 1988, 1989, 1994, 2010; Eastern Conference Semifinals: 1993, 2015; Eastern Conference Finals: 1992 |
| Regular and postseason | Bulls | 155–121 | Bulls, 92–47 | Cavaliers, 72–64 | |
