= The Decision (TV program) =

2010 ESPN special presentation

- Presented by: Stuart Scott, Michael Wilbon, Jon Barry, Chris Broussard, Jim Gray
- Country of origin: United States
- Original language: English

Production
- Production locations: Greenwich, Connecticut, U.S. (Interview segments) Bristol, Connecticut, U.S. (In-studio segments)
- Running time: 75 minutes

Original release
- Network: ESPN
- Release: July 8, 2010

The Decision is a 2010 American television special that aired on ESPN on July 8, 2010, in which National Basketball Association (NBA) player LeBron James announced which team he would join for the 2010–11 season. James was an unrestricted free agent after playing his first seven NBA seasons for the Cleveland Cavaliers; he was a two-time NBA Most Valuable Player and a six-time All-Star. He grew up in nearby Akron, Ohio, where he received national attention as a high school basketball star. During the special, James revealed that he would be signing with the Miami Heat.

== Background ==
James was born and raised in Akron, Ohio, where he received national attention as a high school basketball star at St. Vincent–St. Mary High School. He was drafted out of high school by his hometown Cleveland Cavaliers with the first overall pick of the 2003 NBA draft. He played the first seven seasons of his professional career in Cleveland, where he was a two-time NBA Most Valuable Player and a six-time NBA All-Star, yet won no NBA championships and only made it to the finals once, where the Cavaliers were swept (2007). James became an unrestricted free-agent at 12:01 am EDT (UTC−4) on July 1, 2010. He was courted for recruitment by several teams, including the New York Knicks, Chicago Bulls, New Jersey Nets, Miami Heat, Los Angeles Clippers, and the Cavaliers.

The idea for the show originally came from Bill Simmons's mailbag column in November 2009 on ESPN, which published reader Drew Wagner's question, "What if LeBron announces he will pick his 2010–11 team live on ABC on a certain date for a show called 'LeBron's Choice?'" Wagner's idea was inspired by the trend of high school seniors being recruited announcing their college choice in a news conference. During NBA All-Star Weekend in 2010, Simmons pitched the idea to James's business partner, Maverick Carter; James's then-agent, Leon Rose; and James's advisor, William Wesley. After James and the Cavaliers lost to the Boston Celtics in the NBA playoffs in May, Simmons thought there was no way for the idea to proceed, and he was no longer involved.

During halftime of Game 2 of the NBA Finals in Los Angeles, Carter ran into freelance sportscaster Jim Gray and media agent Ari Emanuel, when Gray pitched the announcement show to Carter and Emanuel. Carter convinced James to do the show, and Emanuel pitched the idea to then-ESPN president John Skipper. Gray's idea was for an hour-long show in which James would announce his decision. Gray once worked for ESPN, and James' management team insisted that he be involved in the interview. ESPN gave away the airtime as barter syndication, allowing James' team to sell ads in exchange for the news story. NBA commissioner David Stern, believing that ESPN was giving too much control to James, tried to get the event cancelled.

Before the special aired, Chris Broussard, who was one of the show's presenters, reported that James would join the Heat based on statements he had heard from multiple sources.

== Announcement ==
On July 8, 2010, ESPN aired a live special named The Decision that ran 75 minutes with commercials. At 9:28 p.m EDT, James announced that he would play with Miami in the 2010–11 season, teaming with the Heat's other All-Star free agent signees Dwyane Wade (who was drafted by, and stayed with the Heat) and Chris Bosh (who had joined from the Toronto Raptors).

In this fall... this is very tough... in this fall I'm going to take my talents to South Beach and join the Miami Heat. I feel like it's going to give me the best opportunity to win and to win for multiple years, and not only just to win in the regular season or just to win five games in a row or three games in a row, I want to be able to win championships. And I feel like I can compete down there.

— LeBron James

The announcement, made nearly 30 minutes into the program, was part of a conversation between James and Gray. Broadcast from the Boys and Girls Club of Greenwich, Connecticut, the show raised $2.5 million for the charity. The show raised an additional $3.5 million from advertisement revenue which was donated to other various charities.

Wade had informed Heat president Pat Riley that James wanted to become less of a scorer and more of a distributor, and James looked forward to no longer carrying the offense night after night as he did playing with Cleveland. Riley sold to James that "LeBron would be Magic Johnson, Dwyane Wade would be Kobe Bryant, Chris would be Kevin Garnett". Relieved of the burden of scoring, James thought he could be the first player to average a triple-double in a season since Oscar Robertson.

The Cavaliers were informed of James' decision minutes before the show began.

Among those in attendance for James' decision were Kanye West and a then 13-year-old Donovan Mitchell.

== Critical reception ==
The television program drew high ratings, with Nielsen announcing that an average of 9.948 million people watched the show in the United States, with 13.1 million watching at the time of James' announcement. Cleveland topped all markets with a 26.0 Nielsen rating and 39 share. The show's Nielsen ratings were 6.1 in households, and 4.1 in 18–49, making it the most watched cable show of the night.

The show drew criticism for the prolonged wait until James' actual announcement, which was mostly filled in with panel discussions. (In a call with media critics the day before the special aired, ESPN said the decision would occur in the first 10 to 15 minutes of the program.) Along with the spectacle of the show itself, the phrase "taking my talents to South Beach" became a punch line for critics.

In Cleveland, fans considered James' departure a betrayal that ranks second to The Move (Art Modell's relocation of the Cleveland Browns to Baltimore). The Associated Press wrote that The Decision joined The Move, The Drive, The Shot, and The Fumble in "Cleveland's sports hall of shame". Cleveland Cavaliers majority owner Dan Gilbert wrote an open letter to fans published in Comic Sans typeface on the Cavs website, denouncing James' decision as a "selfish", "heartless", "callous", and "cowardly betrayal", while declaring that the Cavs would win an NBA title before the "self-declared former King". (This proved incorrect as James' Heat would win the championship in 2012, while the Cavaliers would not do so until 2016, and with James back on the roster). Gilbert's sports-memorabilia company Fathead also lowered the price of wall graphics depicting James from $99.99 to $17.41, the (New Style) birth year of Benedict Arnold.

William Rhoden of The New York Times defended James by stating that Gilbert's "venomous, face-saving personal attack", along with the ensuing "wrath of jersey-burning fans", only validated James' decision to leave Cleveland. Jesse Jackson, an American civil rights activist, said Gilbert's feelings "personify a slave master mentality", and he was treating James as "a runaway slave". Jackson added, "This is an owner employee relationship between business partners and LeBron honored his contract. J. A. Adande of ESPN said, however, that James chose to promote the drama of his decision in an hour-long television special instead of showing "common courtesy" to notify Cleveland and other teams of his plans. On July 12, 2010, Stern fined Gilbert $100,000 for the letter's contents, while also criticizing the way James handled free agency. On July 14, James told J. R. Moehringer for a GQ article that there was "nothing at all" he would change about his conduct during free agency.

Former NBA players criticized his decision to not stay with Cleveland and continuing to try to win a championship as "the guy". Michael Jordan stated that he would not have contacted his rivals from other teams like Magic Johnson and Larry Bird to play on one team together, as "I wanted to defeat those guys". Jordan added that "things are different [now]. I can't say that's a bad thing. It's an opportunity these kids have today". Johnson echoed Jordan's sentiments on teaming with rivals.

On September 29, 2010, when asked by Soledad O'Brien of CNN if race was a factor in the fallout from The Decision, James said, "I think so, at times. There's always – you know, a race factor". James had previously stayed clear of racial issues. When an earlier racial controversy over his cover on Vogue became a national debate, James had no comment. Two African American sports columnists criticized James for injecting race into the issue—Mike Freeman of CBSSports.com said James suddenly bringing up race in this instance was "laughable", and Jason Whitlock of Foxsports.com said James' usage of the race card was "an excuse to avoid dealing with his own bad Decision". Adande, also African American, had a different view, saying James "didn't claim to be a victim of racial persecution" and "caused us to examine the bias that's always lurking".

== Aftermath ==
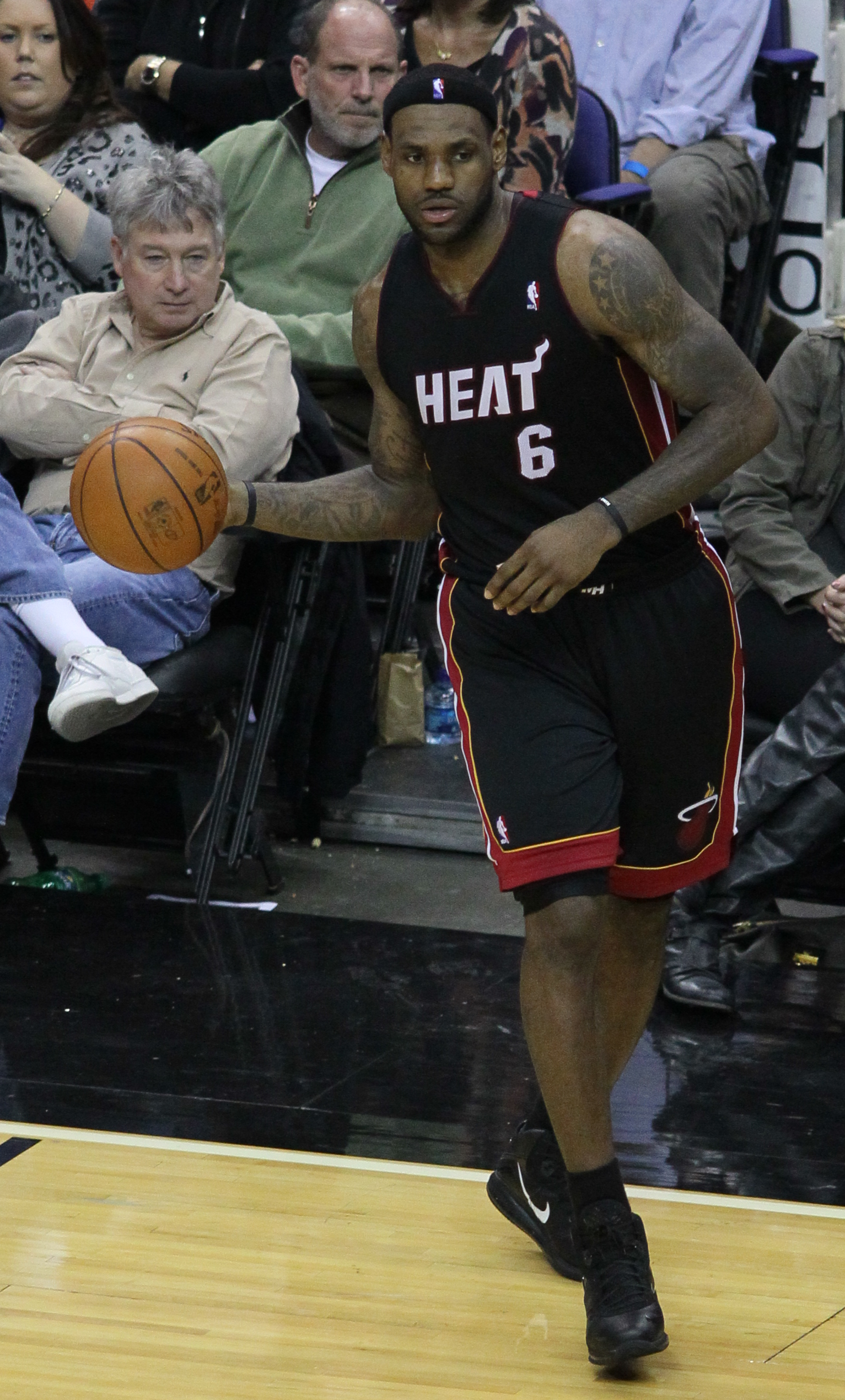
James made 4 straight NBA Finals appearances and won two NBA championships with the Miami Heat.

Although other NBA superteams existed before 2010, the Heat with James was the first created by players' decisions, rather than staff's. Before a game against the New Jersey Nets on October 31, 2010, his first game against one of his suitors, James reflected on his free agency: "If I had to go back on it, I probably would do it a little bit different", James said. "But I'm happy with my decision." He declined to be more specific. Following The Decision, Forbes listed him as one of the world's most disliked athletes. James relented about the TV special before the 2011–12 season: "if the shoe was on the other foot and I was a fan, and I was very passionate about one player, and he decided to leave, I would be upset too about the way he handled it." James won two NBA championships with Miami: the first in 2011–12 in his second season with the Heat, and again the following season in 2012–13. By 2013, his image had mostly recovered and he was reported by ESPN as the most popular player in the NBA for the second time in his career.

The Cavaliers finished their 2010–11 season with a 19–63 record, including a then-NBA-record 26-game losing streak. In the four NBA drafts after James' departure, the Cavaliers won the draft lottery three times to receive the first overall pick. Their 2011 first overall pick, Kyrie Irving, was named the 2012 NBA Rookie of the Year, and was also the MVP of both the All-Star Game and the FIBA Basketball World Cup in 2014.

When James announced his return to the Cavaliers for the 2014–15 season in a Sports Illustrated essay on July 11, 2014, he alluded to the controversy surrounding the special, saying "I'm not having a press conference or a party." He led Cleveland to an NBA championship in 2015–16, when the Cavaliers became the first team ever to rally from a 3–1 deficit to win an NBA Finals. It was the city's first major professional sports title in 52 years.

A poll by Davie-Brown Index after the special found that James's overall appeal dropped 11 percent, while his endorsement appeal dropped 2 percent, and trust in James dropped 3 percent. Another poll from ESPN and Seton Hall taken in October 2010 found that 51.6% of basketball fans said that James move to Miami didn't impact how they viewed him, with 32% of white fans and 65% of Black fans viewing James favorably.

In 2020, ESPN aired a documentary episode about the special titled Backstory: The Decision.

== See also ==
- Cleveland sports curse
