= Mike Davis (defensive back, born 1956) =

American football player (1956–2021)

No. 36
- Position: Safety

Personal information
- Born: April 15, 1956; Berkeley, California, U.S.
- Died: April 25, 2021 (aged 65)
- Listed height: 6 ft 3 in (1.91 m)
- Listed weight: 203 lb (92 kg)

Career information
- High school: Locke (Los Angeles, California)
- College: Colorado
- NFL draft: 1977: 2nd round, 35th overall pick

Career history
- Oakland / Los Angeles Raiders (1977–1986); San Diego Chargers (1987)

Awards and highlights
- 2× Super Bowl champion (XV, XVIII)

Career NFL statistics
- Interceptions: 11
- Sacks: 11
- Fumble recoveries: 12
- Stats at Pro Football Reference

Michael Leonard Davis (April 15, 1956 – April 25, 2021) was an American professional football player who was a safety in the National Football League (NFL). He played college football for the Colorado Buffaloes.

== College career ==
Davis played college football at the University of Colorado, where was part of a team that won the 1976 Big 8 Championship. He was a 1976 NEA All American.

== Professional career ==
Davis played for the National Football League's Oakland Raiders between 1978 and 1985 and the San Diego Chargers for part of 1987. He was a starter on the Raiders Super Bowl XV and Super Bowl XVIII winning teams.

Drafted 35th overall in the second round of the 1977 draft, Davis started playing as the Raiders' third safety. Davis became the starting strong safety in 1979.

Davis is best known for making a key interception at the end of the 1980 AFC Conference playoff game with the Cleveland Browns, in a play known as Red Right 88. Leading 14–12 late in the fourth quarter, after the Raiders recovered a Brian Sipe fumble deep in the Browns' territory, the Raiders turned over the ball on the 15 yard line after failing to gain a yard for a first down. The Browns marched down the field to the Raiders' 13 yard line where the team faced a second and nine. Sipe talked over the next play with head coach Sam Rutigliano who called play "Red Slot Right, Halfback Stay, 88." Rutigliano advised Sipe to throw the ball away if a receiver was not wide open. Rutigliano said:

We'll throw the ball on second down. I'm worried about the field goal. I was worried because of all the events I had witnessed up to that point.

Upon the snap of the bill, Davis read a pass play and slipped initially. Davis recovered his footing and found his coverage assignment, Ozzie Newsome, whom teammate Burgess Owen had been covering. Newsome said that Owens forced him to run deeper into the end zone than intended, allowing Davis to cut in front of him and intercept Brian Sipe's pass.

Davis missed most of the 1981 season when the Vikings' Sammy White roll-blocked him, tearing an ankle ligament and breaking his leg.

Davis' superb play was often overlooked by fans and reporters because he rarely made interceptions (partly because the Raiders didn't often need him to help their star cornerbacks, partly because he wasn't a good pass-catcher and dropped a number of potential picks during his career) and because advanced statistics that would have shown what a truly great safety he was did not exist when he played. Davis said the Raiders defensive philosophy didn't lend itself to strong safeties intercepting a lot of passes but claimed he was a Pro Bowl caliber player.

Davis alleged that his union activities led to the Raiders releasing him in 1985. Davis was the Raiders union representative beginning in his second season. Head Coach Tom Flores denied that was the case, saying the Raiders never cared about a player's union activities.

He finished his career with the San Diego Chargers in 1987.

== Personal life ==
Davis had two sons and a wife, Mary.

Davis lost all hearing in his left ear and then lost all the remaining hearing in his right ear. Davis attributed the hearing loss to some of the hits he inflicted and some he sustained. Davis said that San Diego running back Gary Anderson "was lunging into the impact of tacklers and his knee hit me on the right side of the head; it was the hardest I had ever been hit and it made me physically sick." Davis added

Television doesn't do it justice. You don't see double vision, or even blurred vision. It's multiple vision. When it first happens, it's like going from a sunlit room into the midnight hour, man. That happened to me three times in my career. Coming out of it is like watching the heat rising off the street, and people look like they're waving in the wind, like in ‘The Matrix.’ There was ringing in my ears.

Davis received permanent disability monthly payments because of his hearing loss and lower back pain but said he lived comfortably because of a $8.5 million guaranteed contract with the Raiders and investments.

Davis died at age 65 on April 25, 2021.
