= Curse of Rocky Colavito =

Supposed baseball curse

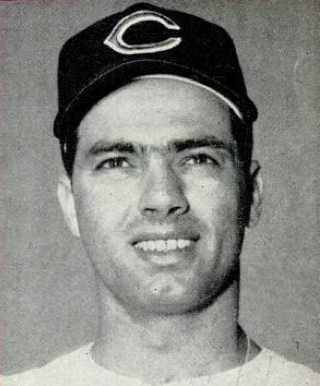
Rocky Colavito, the curse's namesake, was a popular Cleveland player when he was traded in 1960. Colavito did not place the curse, but the Indians/Guardians have not won the World Series since the controversial trade.

The Curse of Rocky Colavito is a phenomenon that supposedly prevents the Cleveland Guardians of Major League Baseball (MLB) from winning, be it the World Series, the American League (AL) pennant, reaching postseason play, or even getting into a pennant race. Its origin is traced back to the unpopular trade of right fielder Rocky Colavito to the Detroit Tigers for Harvey Kuenn in 1960. It was not claimed that Colavito placed the curse, and he denied doing so. It is one of several curses believed to have stricken the city of Cleveland's major sports franchises for decades. The Guardians, who were known as the Cleveland Indians through the 2021 season, played in the World Series in 1995, 1997, and 2016, but lost all three to the Atlanta Braves, Florida Marlins, and Chicago Cubs, respectively. Cleveland has not won a World Series since 1948. Colavito died in 2024.

== Origins ==
On April 17, 1960, the then-Cleveland Indians traded Rocky Colavito to the Detroit Tigers for Harvey Kuenn. This trade was unique because Colavito was 1959's American League home run champion, with 42, while Kuenn hit .353 as the A.L. batting champion. Fans in Cleveland were outraged by what they saw as the betrayal by the Indians' general manager, Frank Lane. In only two years with the Indians, Lane had taken a mostly successful 40-man roster and had traded away every player he had inherited. Detroit fans were mostly happy about the trade.

The idea of the curse was first presented in print by Terry Pluto, who had previously covered the Indians for The Plain Dealer. In his 1994 book, The Curse of Rocky Colavito: A Loving Look at a Thirty-Year Slump, Pluto suggested that the trade, made by Indians general manager Frank Lane to blunt Colavito's popularity and end his salary demands, led to a 34-season stretch where the Indians did not finish the season within 11 games of first place, from 1960 to 1993. By 1994, the team had not won a pennant since 1954, or a World Series since 1948.

In The Curse of Rocky Colavito, Pluto writes of many of the misfortunes that struck the Indians following the Colavito trade:

- Getting Colavito back in 1965, from the Kansas City Athletics, but sending pitcher Tommy John and outfielder Tommie Agee to the Chicago White Sox in a three-team trade. John, who had won only two games in the major leagues, would go on to win another 286, mostly for the Los Angeles Dodgers and New York Yankees, and play on four teams that reached the World Series. Agee, still a prospect when traded, would win the American League's Rookie of the Year award in 1966. He then would be traded to the New York Mets, where his hitting and fielding would be a major factor in their 1969 World Championship season.
- Trading pitcher Jim "Mudcat" Grant to the Minnesota Twins in 1964, for Lee Stange and George Banks. Grant was 28 years old and had won 67 games in his career. After the trade, he would win 78 more, including 21 in 1965, when he helped the Twins win their first pennant. Grant would later return to the Indians as a broadcaster.
- The alcoholism of pitcher Sam McDowell, who went from being one of the game's top pitchers in the 1960s to an unreliable pitcher who left the game at age 32. He would eventually stop drinking and become a counselor to athletes with drinking problems.
- The mental illness of first baseman Tony Horton, a power hitter who couldn't handle the stress of playing in the major leagues, and left the game in the middle of the 1970 season at age 25. Like McDowell, he would receive treatment and recover, but he never returned to baseball.
- The rushing of pitcher Steve Dunning to the major leagues. The second overall pick in the 1970 baseball draft, Dunning was brought straight to the major leagues from Stanford University without ever pitching in the minors. Called up too soon, he quit baseball in 1977, at the age of 28, with a career record of 23 wins and 41 losses.
- The signing and injury of Wayne Garland. In 1976, Garland, a 25-year-old right-handed pitcher for the Baltimore Orioles, won 20 games and lost only 7. A free agent after that season, the Indians offered him a contract worth $2.3 million over 10 years. But Garland hurt his shoulder in his first spring training with the Indians, and chose to pitch through the pain rather than have immediate surgery and went 13-19 in 1977. He retired in 1980, at age 30, with a career record of 55-66.
- The 1984 trade of pitcher Rick Sutcliffe to the Chicago Cubs, along with two other players, for outfielders Joe Carter and Mel Hall and two others. Sutcliffe would help the Cubs win the National League Eastern Division title that year and won the NL's Cy Young Award, then won it again in 1989. He won 35 games in just over two seasons with the Indians, then won 114 more after they traded him. Hall was a good hitter but a disappointment, and though Carter became one of baseball's top sluggers with the Indians, they never had a pitcher as good as Sutcliffe while Carter was on the team. Carter would be traded to the San Diego Padres in 1989 for catcher Sandy Alomar Jr. and second baseman Carlos Baerga, possibly the best trade in the Indians' recent history, as Alomar and Baerga would be major cogs in their 1990s success. The Padres would trade Carter to the Toronto Blue Jays, where he would lead them to back-to-back World Series wins, including 1993, when his home run won the Series.
- The 1987 baseball preview issue of Sports Illustrated magazine. Following a surprising 84-win season for the Indians in 1986, the cover showed Indians sluggers Carter and Cory Snyder, and carried the words "INDIAN UPRISING" and the sub-headline, "Believe it! Cleveland is the best team in the American League!" The Indians lost 101 games that year (finishing with the worst record in Major League Baseball that season), though some believe that this collapse was partially caused by the Sports Illustrated cover jinx as well as this curse.
- The 1993 spring training boating accident that killed relief pitchers Steve Olin and Tim Crews and nearly killed starting pitcher Bob Ojeda. As reliever Kevin Wickander was so grief-stricken at the loss of Olin that he was traded in mid-season and never regained his effectiveness, the Indians essentially lost four pitchers due to one accident.

Since the book's publication in 1994, Pluto has written two sequels: Burying the Curse in 1995 and Our Tribe in 1999, the latter insisting that the curse was still in place.

Despite the "evidence" of a curse on the team, Colavito has denied ever placing one.

=== Curse beyond Cleveland ===
On the day of the Colavito trade, the Indians played the Chicago White Sox in an exhibition game at 64-year-old Russwood Park in Memphis, Tennessee. Colavito hit a home run in the second inning, and reporters in the press box were informed of the trade shortly thereafter. Four hours after the game ended, Russwood Park - constructed primarily of wood in 1896 - was destroyed in a five-alarm fire.

=== Another curse? ===
Prior to the publication of Pluto's book The Curse of Rocky Colavito, there had been another explanation for the Guardians' difficulties, one that came after the 1954 World Series but preceded the 1960 Colavito trade. The then Indians fired manager Bobby Bragan in 1958. According to the story, although he always denied it, Bragan walked out to the pitcher's mound at Cleveland Municipal Stadium and placed a curse on the Indians, saying they would never win another pennant.

== See also ==
- Baseball superstition
- Cleveland sports curse
- Sports-related curses
