= Red Right 88 =

1981 American football play and game

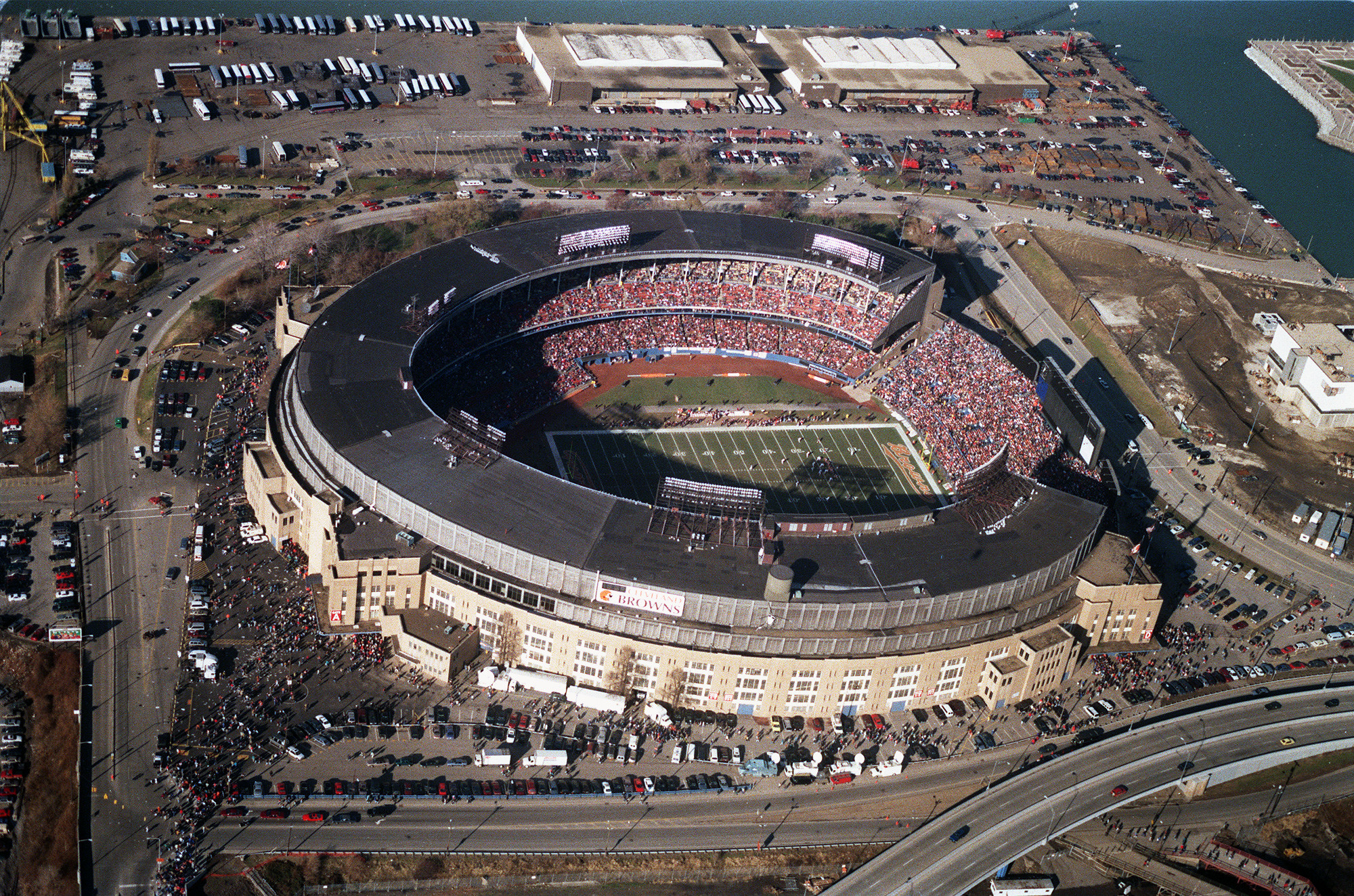
- Cleveland Stadium, the site of the game.
Oakland Raiders (4) (11–5)	Cleveland Browns (2) (11–5)
14	12
Head coach: Tom Flores	Head coach: Sam Rutigliano
	1	2	3	4	Total
OAK	0	7	0	7	14
CLE	0	6	6	0	12
- Date: January 4, 1981
- Stadium: Cleveland Stadium; Cleveland, Ohio
- Referee: Ben Dreith
- Attendance: 77,655

TV in the United States
- Network: NBC
- Announcers: Don Criqui and John Brodie

In American football, Red Right 88 is the name given to a passing play called by the Cleveland Browns during a National Football League (NFL) playoff game against the Oakland Raiders on January 4, 1981. In the years since, the term has been used to refer to both the play itself and the game.

== Background ==
The Red Right 88 game was a divisional playoff game played as part of the 1980–81 NFL playoffs, which would crown the NFL champion for the 1980 season. Under the playoff structure in place at the time, five teams from each of the NFL's two conferences – the American Football Conference (AFC) and National Football Conference (NFC) – would qualify for the playoffs. These five teams would consist of the champions of each of the three divisions of each conference (the East, Central, and West), plus two wild card teams, which were the two teams who finished with the best win-loss record in each conference who were not division champions. These five teams would be seeded one through five based on win-loss record for purposes of playoff bracketing, with the three division champions seeded one through three and the two wild card qualifiers seeded four and five.

The Browns had finished in first place in the AFC Central division during the 1980 season with an 11–5 win-loss record. Although the Houston Oilers had also compiled an 11–5 record during the 1980 season, Cleveland claimed the AFC Central championship by virtue of having a better record than Houston against other AFC opponents (the Browns had an 8–4 conference record, compared to the 7–5 conference record of the Oilers). Like the Browns, the Raiders had also finished the 1980 season with an 11–5 record. However, they finished in second place in the AFC West division behind the San Diego Chargers, who also had an 11–5 win-loss record. San Diego had been awarded the division title over Oakland because they had scored more net points against division opponents (60) than Oakland (37) during the season.

As the Browns, Raiders, Chargers, Oilers, and AFC East division champion Buffalo Bills all finished with identical 11–5 records, the league was forced to resort to tiebreakers to determine seeding for the playoff tournament. San Diego attained the first overall seed in the AFC because they had a better record against other AFC opponents than Cleveland and Buffalo (9–3 for San Diego compared to 8–4 for both Cleveland and Buffalo). The Browns, however, were named the second seed over the Bills because they had a better record against common opponents (5–2) than the Bills (5–3). As the Raiders and Oilers had both finished with the best second-place records in the AFC, they both qualified for the playoffs as wild card teams; the Raiders were named the fourth seed as they had a better record against AFC opponents (9–3) than the Oilers (7–5).

The playoff system stipulated that the top three seeds in each conference would get a bye into the second round of the playoffs (the divisional playoff), while the two wild card teams would play each other in the first round of the playoffs (the wild card playoff). The victor of the wild card playoff would then face the top conference seed in the divisional playoff, unless the wild card victor and top conference seed were in the same division, in which case the wild card victor would play the second seed.

In the AFC wild card playoff on December 28, 1980, the Raiders defeated the Oilers 27–7 to move on to the divisional playoff, where under normal circumstances they would have played the Chargers, who were the top AFC seed. However, as the Raiders and Chargers were both in the AFC West, the Raiders would instead play the Browns, the second seed in the AFC, in the divisional playoff.

== Game summary ==
With the game-time temperature at 4 °F (−16 °C), the coldest National Football League game since the Ice Bowl of December 31, 1967, the first quarter contained nothing but punts and interceptions, with Cleveland's Ron Bolton and Oakland's Lester Hayes each recording one of the latter. Near the end of the quarter, Browns quarterback Brian Sipe's 20-yard completion to Reggie Rucker sparked a drive that reached inside the Raiders' 30-yard line, but it ended with no points early in the second quarter when Don Cockroft missed a field goal attempt from 47 yards. On Oakland's ensuing drive, quarterback Jim Plunkett lost a fumble while being sacked, but their defense kept the Browns in check and Cockroft missed another field goal attempt, this one from 30 yards out.

With 6:02 left in the second quarter, Bolton scored the first points of the day by recording his second interception of Plunkett and returning it 42 yards to the end zone. However, Cockroft's ensuing extra point was blocked by Ted Hendricks. After an exchange of punts, Oakland managed to get on the scoreboard, with Plunkett completing passes to Bob Chandler and Raymond Chester for gains of 15 and 26 yards highlighting a 64-yard scoring drive. Mark van Eeghen finished the drive with a 1-yard touchdown run with 18 seconds left in the half, making the score 7–6.

On Cleveland's opening drive of the second half, a 28-yard kickoff return to the 40-yard line by Charles White started a 48-yard drive that ended with Cockroft's 30-yard field goal, giving the lead back to the Browns, 9–7. After forcing a punt, Cleveland drove to the Raiders' 24-yard line, but on a field goal attempt, holder Paul McDonald was unable to handle a bad snap and was tackled for an 11-yard loss. On their next drive on the Raiders' 44-yard line after a punt, Cleveland drove to the 9-yard line, featuring a 21-yard reception by Dave Logan. The drive ended with another 30-yard field goal by Cockroft, making the score 12–7 going into the fourth quarter.

Early in the final quarter, the Raiders took a 14–12 lead with an 80-yard drive highlighted by Chester's 27-yard catch. On the last play, van Eeghen scored his second 1-yard touchdown run of the day. The Raiders had a chance to put the game away when they recovered a fumble from Sipe on the Browns' 24-yard line with 4:19 left in the game. But on 3rd down with 1 yard to go at the Browns' 15-yard line, van Eeghen was stuffed for no gain on two consecutive plays, and Cleveland regained the ball on downs. On the second play of the ensuing drive, Sipe completed a 29-yard pass to tight end Ozzie Newsome, and four plays later connected on a 23-yard pass to Greg Pruitt. Then Mike Pruitt ran the ball 14 yards to the Raiders' 14-yard line. Pruitt gained another yard on the next play, and the team called a timeout with 49 seconds left.

1980 AFC Divisional Playoffs: (4) Oakland Raiders at (2) Cleveland Browns – Game Summary

Quarter	1	2	3	4	Total
Raiders	0	7	0	7	14
Browns	0	6	6	0	12

at Cleveland Stadium, Cleveland, Ohio

- Date: January 4, 1981
- Game time: 12:30 p.m. EST
- Game weather: Clear, 4 °F (−16 °C)
- Game attendance: 77,655
- Referee: Ben Dreith
- TV announcers (NBC): Don Criqui and John Brodie
- Pro-Football-Reference.com

Game information

First quarter

- No scoring plays.

Second quarter

- CLE – Ron Bolton 42-yard interception return (kick failed). Browns 6–0.
- OAK – Mark van Eeghen 1-yard run (Chris Bahr kick). Raiders 7–6.

Third quarter

- CLE – Don Cockroft 30-yard field goal. Browns 9–7.
- CLE – Don Cockroft 30-yard field goal. Browns 12–7.

Fourth quarter

- OAK – Mark van Eeghen 1-yard run (Chris Bahr kick). Raiders 14–12.

Top passers

- OAK – Jim Plunkett – 14/30, 149 yards, 2 INT
- CLE – Brian Sipe – 13/40, 183 yards, 3 INT

Top rushers

- OAK – Mark van Eeghen – 20 rushes, 45 yards, 2 TD
- CLE – Mike Pruitt – 13 rushes, 48 yards

Top receivers

- OAK – Raymond Chester – 3 receptions, 64 yards
- CLE – Greg Pruitt – 3 receptions, 54 yards

== The play ==
Trailing 14–12 with less than a minute remaining in the game, the Browns had the ball on the Raiders' 13-yard line and were in position to kick a potential game-winning field goal. Sipe conferred with head coach Sam Rutigliano, who called a pass play, "Red Slot Right, Halfback Stay, 88," and instructed Sipe to "throw it into Lake Erie" (throwing the ball out of play as it was only 2nd down), if the play was anything less than wide open. On the next play, Sipe forced a pass to tight end Ozzie Newsome. However, it was intercepted in the end zone by Raiders safety Mike Davis, who had cut in front of Newsome's square-out pass route, putting an end to the Browns' season. The Raiders subsequently advanced to the AFC conference championship, where they defeated the San Diego Chargers, 34–27 and went on to win Super Bowl XV over the Philadelphia Eagles, 27–10.

The logic behind trying for the touchdown was that Cockroft, the Browns' placekicker, had previously missed two field goal attempts, had one extra point attempt blocked, and had another aborted following a bad snap. In addition, the weather was brutally cold and windy. "What many people don't know about that situation is that I was a long way from being 100 percent physically in 1980," Cockroft said in a 2006 interview. "I had two herniated discs and needed four epidurals to just get through the season. I probably should have gone on IR [the injured reserve list]." Cockroft was released by the Browns at the end of their 1981 training camp and retired soon after. In an NFL Films retrospective on the game, one of Mike Davis' teammates laughed over the play because Davis (an outstanding tackler and team leader) had notoriously poor hands and had often dropped potential interceptions during his career, only for Davis to make the biggest stop of his career by making a difficult catch during freezing, windy weather when it mattered the most.

Had the play been executed properly, it may have resulted in a touchdown. The primary receiver, Dave Logan, was crossing left-to-right, had a step on his defender, and was open at the 6-yard line. Sipe misread the defensive back's movements and thought Logan was covered so he threw to the secondary receiver and it was intercepted. Furthermore, this drive had occurred right after the Raiders also eschewed a short field goal attempt, choosing to run the ball on 3rd and 4th down at the Browns' 15-yard line, needing only one yard for a first down, only to get stuffed for no gain each time.

The play call itself has since become an infamous part of Cleveland sports lore, ranking with The Drive, The Fumble, The Catch [from 1954 World Series], Game 7 of the 1997 World Series, The Shot, The Decision, and The Move as a bad memory that symbolizes the 52-year professional championship drought that plagued the city until the Cleveland Cavaliers won the 2016 NBA Finals.

== See also ==
- Cleveland sports curse
- 1980–81 NFL playoffs
- The Fumble
- The Drive
- Cleveland Browns relocation to Baltimore
