= Cleveland sports curse =

Superstition involving Cleveland's sports teams

The Cleveland sports curse was a sports superstition involving the city of Cleveland, Ohio, and its major league professional sports teams, centered on the failure to win a championship in any major league sport for 52 years, from 1964 to 2016. Three major league teams based in Cleveland contributed to belief in the curse: the Browns of the National Football League (NFL); the Cavaliers of the National Basketball Association (NBA); and the then-Indians of Major League Baseball (MLB).

The championship drought began after the Browns defeated the Baltimore Colts in the 1964 NFL Championship Game, two seasons before the first Super Bowl. The city's professional sports teams, including the short-lived Barons franchise of the National Hockey League, then went an unprecedented 147 combined seasons without a championship. The drought ended when the Cavaliers beat the Golden State Warriors in Game 7 of the 2016 NBA Finals by overcoming a 3–1 series deficit, an event widely interpreted as having broken the curse.

== Cleveland Browns ==
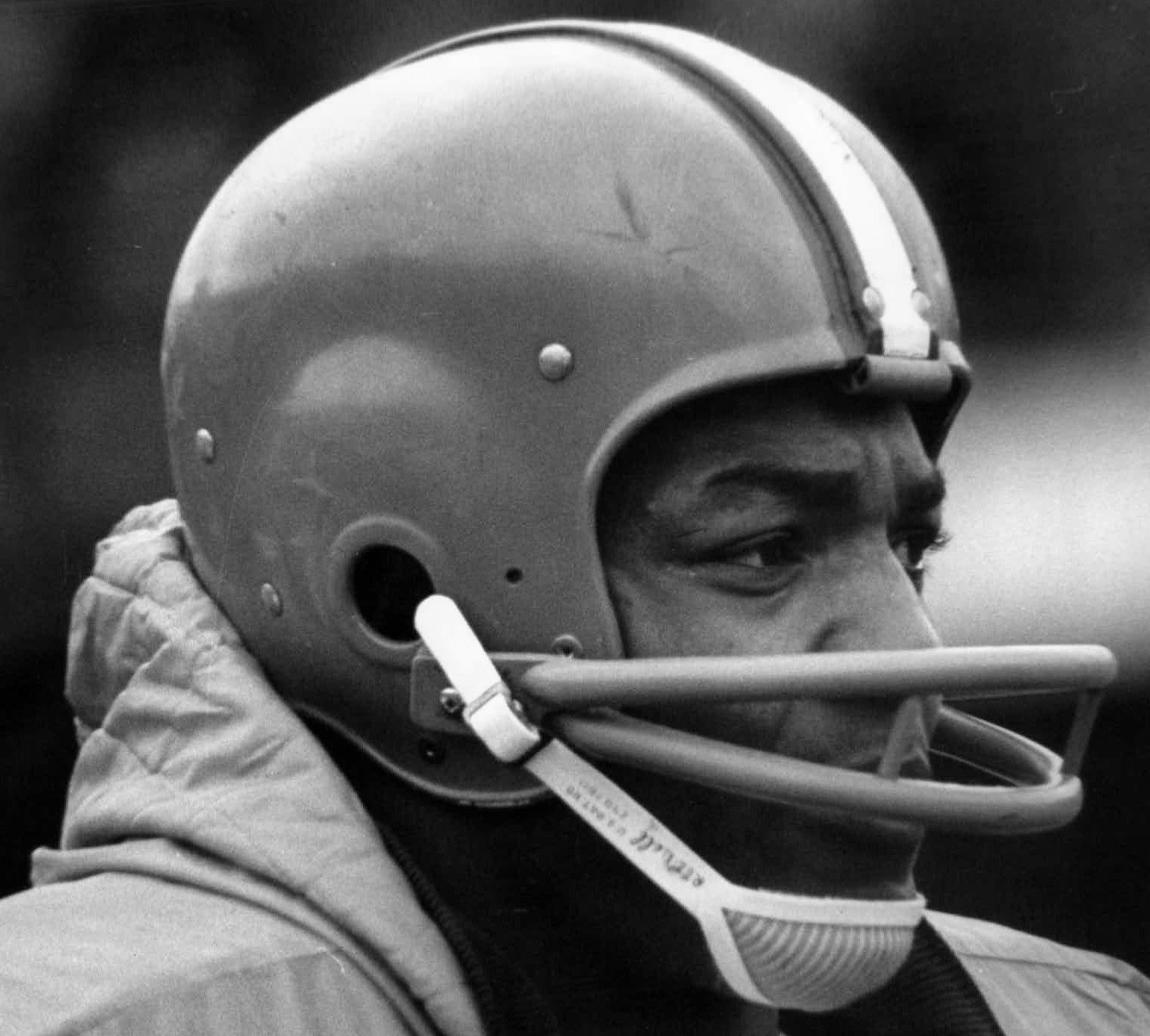
Jim Brown helped the Browns win the 1964 NFL Championship Game, Cleveland's last championship before the Cavaliers won the 2016 NBA Finals.

Much of the discussion of the curse is centered on the NFL's Cleveland Browns, who have not won a championship since 1964 and have suffered a series of questionable coaching decisions, disappointing losses and draft busts.

Before Art Modell became majority owner of the team, the Browns had dominated the NFL and the earlier All-America Football Conference (AAFC), winning seven championships in 17 years. After three non-playoff seasons, the 1964 Browns' team finished 10–3–1 and appeared in the 1964 NFL Championship Game against a heavily favored Baltimore Colts team coached by Don Shula with Pro Football Hall of Fame quarterback Johnny Unitas as its signal caller. The Browns beat the Colts 27–0 at Cleveland Stadium. This particular Browns team consisted of many players initially drafted and acquired by Paul Brown, the Browns' former long-time head coach and architect of the team's earlier successes, who had been fired by Modell early in 1963. During the next 30 years in Cleveland, not a single Modell team won the league or conference title, although they did appear in seven NFL/American Football Conference (AFC) championship games.

The Browns returned to the NFL Championship Game in 1965, where they lost to the Green Bay Packers. In the spring of 1966, star running back Jim Brown was cast in the film The Dirty Dozen. Brown went to England to take part in filming, which suffered production delays due to stormy weather. The production delays caused Brown to miss the first part of training camp, resulting in Modell fining him for every day he missed. Not one to take threats, Brown–who had won three MVPs, had made the Pro Bowl all nine years of his career, and was the NFL's all-time leading rusher at that point–chose to retire rather than pay the fines. The Browns missed the playoffs in 1966 and were knocked out by the Cowboys 52–14 in 1967. The Browns made the NFL Championship Game in 1968, but lost to the Colts 34–0. The Browns returned in 1969, losing to the Vikings 27–7. After the AFL-NFL merger, the Browns were placed in the AFC. There, the Browns made two playoff trips in 1971 and 1972, but suffered early exits both times.

The Browns did not return to the playoffs until 1980. Trailing by two points to the Oakland Raiders and in field goal range with less than one minute remaining in the AFC divisional playoff game, the Browns executed a passing play that was intercepted in the end zone. The play, called by Browns head coach Sam Rutigliano, has become known as "Red Right 88". The Raiders later went on to win that seasons's Super Bowl. In 1986, the Browns were one game away from playing in what would have been the franchise's first Super Bowl when they fell short in one of the most memorable games in NFL history. The Browns were leading the Denver Broncos 20–13 in the fourth quarter when Broncos quarterback John Elway led a 98-yard game-tying drive in just over 5 minutes. The game went to overtime, and the Broncos kicked a field goal to seal the victory. Elway's fourth quarter march and the game itself became known as "The Drive", a title that both signifies Elway's brilliance in the clutch and the Browns' inability to close out important games. The Browns and Broncos both returned to the AFC Championship Game the next year. With the Browns down 38–31 late in the fourth quarter, Browns' running back Earnest Byner was handed the ball near the goal line. Byner, who was in the midst of a great performance, was stripped of the ball and the Broncos recovered on their 2-yard line. The Broncos surrendered an intentional safety and went on to win 38–33, while Byner's blunder became known as "The Fumble". The Browns returned to the AFC Championship game in 1989, again losing to the Broncos. As of the 2024 NFL season, the Browns have not returned to the AFC Championship Game since and remain one of four teams to never play in a Super Bowl, along with the Detroit Lions, Houston Texans, and Jacksonville Jaguars.

The Browns were at the center of a relocation controversy in 1995. The decision by then-Browns owner Art Modell to move the Browns, which had been an 11–5 team the previous season, to Baltimore infuriated and confused Browns fans. After negotiations with the NFL and the city of Cleveland, Modell was allowed to move the team's personnel to Baltimore, where it became a new franchise known as the Baltimore Ravens. The Ravens won a Super Bowl in only their fifth year of existence, doing so with former Browns tight end Ozzie Newsome as their general manager. In addition to Newsome's success, coach Bill Belichick, who was fired as Browns' head coach soon after the 1995 season, became head coach of the New England Patriots five years later. With the Patriots, Belichick coached only four losing seasons and won nine AFC Championships and six Super Bowls. The struggles of the Browns since rejoining the NFL, as well as the success of both Newsome and Belichick, were chronicled in the NFL Films feature A Football Life: 1995 Cleveland Browns.

The Browns returned to the NFL in 1999, after a three-year period of deactivation. In the 1999 NFL draft, the Browns selected Tim Couch, hoping he would be a franchise quarterback. Ty Detmer was brought in to usher in the planned "Couch era", but after a string of dismal performances by Detmer, Couch was rushed into the starting position. Couch struggled to perform without a talented roster around him, which led to his eventual departure from the Browns after 2003. The Browns could have selected Kurt Warner in the 1999 NFL expansion draft, as the St. Louis Rams left him unprotected. However the Browns chose not to do so. Warner would go on to win the NFL Most Valuable Player Award in the 1999 and 2001 seasons and also helped the Rams win Super Bowl XXXIV. The Browns suffered through losing seasons in their first three seasons after their return, but returned to the playoffs in 2002, losing to the Pittsburgh Steelers in the Wild Card round despite having a 24–7 lead in the 3rd quarter of that game. The Browns would not have another winning season until 2007, when they went 10–6. The Browns missed the playoffs because they lost the divisional tiebreaker to the Steelers on account of a head-to-head sweep and the wild card tiebreaker to the Titans based on head-to-head record against common opponents.

The Browns never finished better than 7–9 in the 2010s. In the 2011 NFL draft, the Browns held the sixth overall pick, but traded back with the Atlanta Falcons. The Falcons would use that pick to select Julio Jones while the Browns used the third overall pick in 2012 to select Trent Richardson. Jones would go on to be considered one of the best wide receivers of the 2010s with Atlanta, while Richardson only appeared in 17 games before being traded to the Colts in 2013 for a 2014 first-round pick. The Browns used the first-round pick they received from the Colts to select Johnny Manziel, whose career was overshadowed by numerous off-field issues and played his last game in 2015. On November 30, 2015, the Browns played the Baltimore Ravens in their first Monday Night Football game in six years. After trailing 17–3 in the second quarter, the Browns rallied behind quarterbacks Josh McCown and Austin Davis to tie the game at 27 with 1:47 left. Browns cornerback Tramon Williams intercepted a pass at mid-field with 50 seconds left. The Browns attempted a 51-yard field goal with three seconds left to win the game, only to see the attempt blocked and returned by Ravens safety Will Hill for a touchdown, handing the Browns their most painful loss in recent history. The event was called "The Block" by some disgruntled fans on Twitter only moments after the end of the game.

The Browns' struggles continued after the Curse ended in 2016. After going 1–15 in 2016, the Browns arguably hit rock-bottom in the 2017 season, where, under head coach Hue Jackson, the Browns went a league-worst and franchise record-worst 0–16, becoming just the second team in NFL history since the implementation of the 16-game season (joining the 2008 Detroit Lions) to lose every game in a season. The Browns eventually posted a winning record and returned to the playoffs in 2020 and 2023.

== Cleveland Cavaliers ==
The Cleveland Cavaliers are a professional basketball team who have played in the National Basketball Association (NBA) since 1970.

Over the franchise's first 16 years, the team produced just three winning seasons, the highlight being the 1975–76 "Miracle at Richfield" team, whose improbable playoff run was doomed by an injury to Jim Chones. The early-mid 1980s saw the franchise ruined by owner Ted Stepien's decision to trade away every first-round pick the Cavaliers held for inferior talent, while those picks turned into players such as James Worthy and Derek Harper. Despite this, the Cavaliers gained respectability towards the end of the decade and the early 1990s, making the playoffs with players such as Mark Price, Brad Daugherty, Larry Nance, Hot Rod Williams and Craig Ehlo on their roster.

In 1989, the Cavaliers faced the Chicago Bulls in the first round of the playoffs. In the decisive fifth game, Craig Ehlo had given the Cavaliers the lead with three seconds to play. However, the Bulls' Michael Jordan jumped over Ehlo to make the game-winning shot, known as The Shot, and the Bulls won the game, 101–100, to clinch the series. Despite six trips to the playoffs between 1988 and 1994, including a 1992 Eastern Conference Finals appearance, the Cavaliers never made it to the NBA Finals, as Jordan's Bulls defeated them in the playoffs five times during the Daugherty–Nance–Price era.

In 2007, Ohio native LeBron James led the Cavaliers to their first NBA Finals appearance. However, they were swept by the San Antonio Spurs. Two years later, the Cavaliers, despite posting a conference-best 66–16 record, lost the 2009 Eastern Conference Finals to the Orlando Magic, 4–2. In the following season's playoffs, though his team always possessed home-court advantage, the reigning two-time MVP James and the 2009–10 Cavaliers (61–21) were defeated by the visiting Boston Celtics in Game 5 of the Eastern Conference Semifinals, 120–88. The Cavaliers went on to lose the series, 4–2.

During the 2010 NBA free agency period, James was featured in a television special titled The Decision. Having notified the Cavaliers just moments prior to the television event, James announced "In this fall — this is very tough — in this fall I'm gonna take my talents to South Beach and join the Miami Heat." The quote was heavily criticized. James, along with the help of Dwyane Wade and Chris Bosh, led the Heat to four consecutive NBA Finals appearances, winning twice, while the Cavaliers' record fell to the bottom of the NBA echelon. In those four years without LeBron, they acquired three number-one picks (Kyrie Irving in 2011, Anthony Bennett in 2013 and Andrew Wiggins in 2014). The team struggled to win games, setting an NBA record for most consecutive losses with 26 in the 2010–11 season.

After the 2013–14 season, James opted out of his contract with Miami and returned to the Cavaliers. After signing James, the Cavaliers traded their two most recent number-one draft picks, Andrew Wiggins and Anthony Bennett, for Minnesota Timberwolves star Kevin Love to form their own "Big 3," which was rounded out by Irving. The Cavaliers advanced to the 2015 NBA Finals. However, several Cavaliers players were injured during the season, including Anderson Varejão with a ruptured Achilles tendon, Love with a dislocated shoulder, and Irving with a fractured patella in Game 1 of the Finals. Though losing nearly all of James' supporting cast, the Cavaliers took a 2–1 series lead before falling to the Golden State Warriors, 4–2.

The next season, despite a 30–11 start, the team fired coach David Blatt and replaced him with assistant Tyronn Lue. It was revealed that Blatt had a turbulent relationship with James as well as several other players. The Cavaliers lost to the Chicago Bulls 96–83 at home in Lue's debut as Cavaliers' head coach. The Cavaliers finished the season 57–25, earning the top seed in the Eastern Conference. They advanced to the NBA Finals, losing only two games on the way.

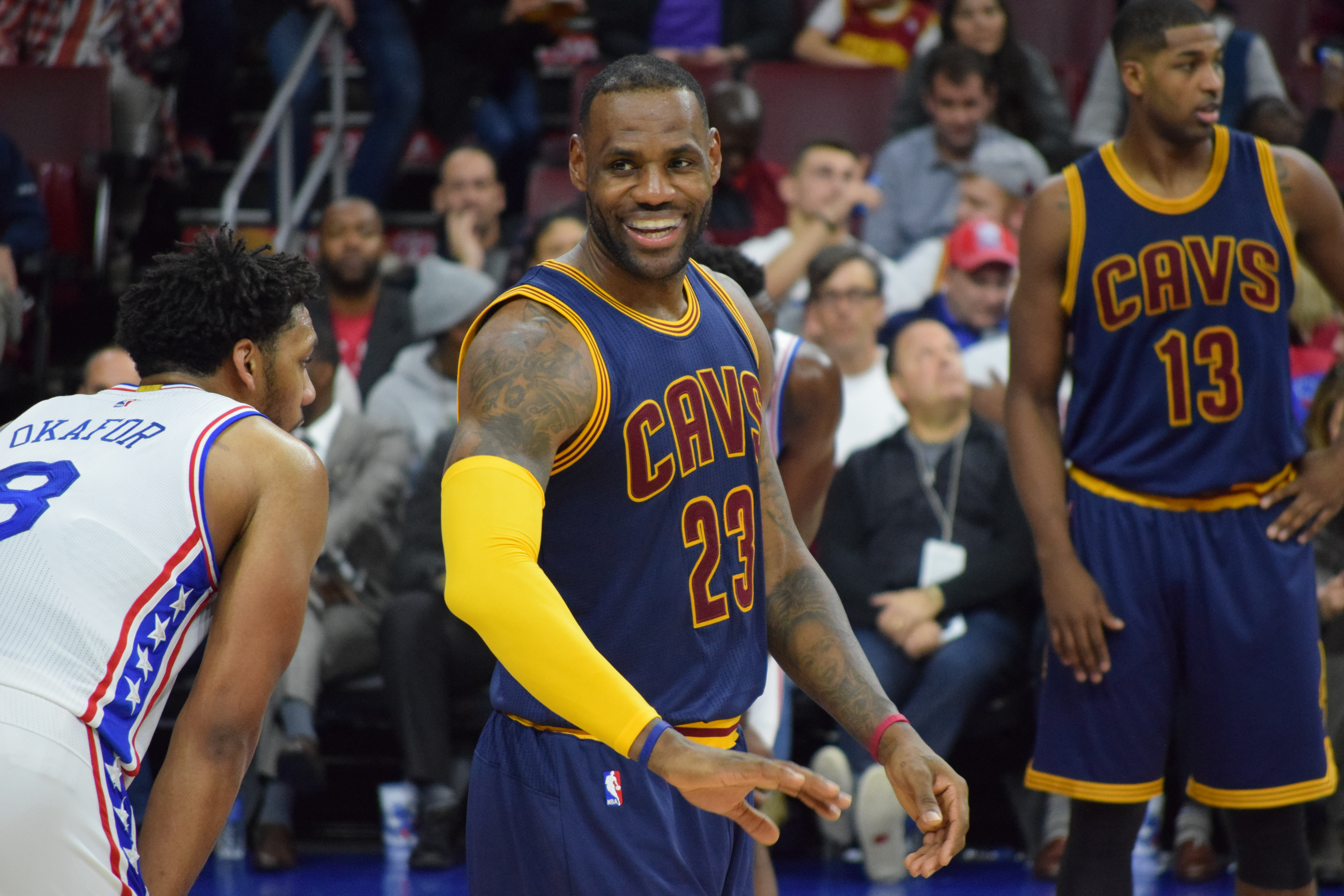
LeBron James in January 2016, a few months prior to leading the Cavaliers to Cleveland's first championship in 52 years.

The Cavaliers defeated the Golden State Warriors in the 2016 NBA Finals which was a rematch of the previous season's Finals. Through the first four games, the Cavaliers were trailing the record-setting 73-win Warriors in the series, 3–1. However, the Cavaliers won the next three games to win their first NBA championship in franchise history, becoming the first team in NBA Finals history to overcome a 3–1 deficit, and the first team since 1978 to win a Finals Game 7 on the road. A particularly memorable moment in Game 7 was when James successfully pursued and blocked Andre Iguodala on a fast break late in the fourth quarter, a defensive play known among Cavaliers fans as The Block. Following would be a three-point shot by Kyrie Irving, to put the Cavaliers ahead for good at 92–89 with 53 seconds left in the fourth quarter. Following that, Cavaliers' forward Kevin Love was switched and forced to play one-on-one defense against Stephen Curry. Curry tried an array of dribbling moves but ultimately missed his 3-point attempt, with the typically slow-footed Love staying in front of and pestering the Warriors guard.. The game has since been called "The Comeback" and "The End," a reference to it having ended a 52-year championship drought.

== Cleveland Indians ==
The then-Cleveland Indians (now known as the Cleveland Guardians), like the Browns and Cavaliers, also experienced the curse. The Indians' failure to win a World Series since 1948 has led the Cleveland Scene to dub the team's shortcomings The Curse of Chief Wahoo. Chief Wahoo was a Native American caricature which served as the Indians' cap insignia prior to being discontinued in 2018. The Chief Wahoo insignia had been controversial. The Indians considered changing it in 1993, but the logo was retained on the home caps, alternate away caps, and jersey sleeves until 2019. In 2002, the Indians introduced a script "I" alternate logo and cap insignia. In 2011, the alternate logo was changed to the block "C." The Block "C" became the team's primary logo beginning in 2014. The team ultimately dropped the "Indians" name in 2022 in favor of "Guardians". The Curse of Rocky Colavito is another phenomenon that is supposedly preventing the team from winning a World Series. The 1989 film Major League was based on the Indians' poor performance since 1954, as the Indians had finished within five games of a playoff berth just three times between 1955 and 1989.

In 1954, the Indians had one of the greatest seasons in baseball history, winning 111 games in what was the only time from 1949 to 1958 in which the New York Yankees did not win the American League pennant. Heavily favored against the New York Giants in the World Series, the Indians seemed poised to break the game open in the top of the eighth inning of Game 1, when Indians first baseman Vic Wertz hit a deep fly ball to center field. Since the game was held at the Polo Grounds (which was 483 feet from home plate to center field), the ball remained in play, even though it would have been a home run in any other ballpark. As such, Giants center fielder Willie Mays made an improbable, over-the-shoulder, no-look catch on the run to rob Wertz of an extra-base hit, leaving the game tied at two in a play that became known as The Catch. In the bottom of the tenth inning, Giants batter Dusty Rhodes hit a walk-off home run to give the Giants the win. The Giants went on to sweep the Indians in the World Series in what became one of the biggest upsets in World Series history. In 1969, Major League Baseball expanded its postseason and introduced divisional play, the Indians were placed in the American League East. Despite the introductions of divisions and expanded playoffs, the Indians found themselves unable to win the AL East division, as they finished above .500 on just four occasions during their time in the AL East from 1969 to 1993. The Indians did not return to the postseason until the postseason was expanded further in 1995.

The historic 1995 season saw the Indians win 100 games and make it to the World Series for the first time in 41 years, but lost in six games to the Atlanta Braves, led by the Braves' Big Three of Greg Maddux, John Smoltz, and World Series MVP Tom Glavine. The Braves' victory was their only World Series win in their 15 consecutive trips to the playoffs between 1991 and 2005. In 1996, the Indians won 99 games, which was the most in the American League. However, they lost the ALDS in four games to the Orioles. The Indians returned to the World Series in 1997 and were leading 2–1 heading into the bottom of the ninth inning of Game 7, only for José Mesa to blow the save to Craig Counsell's sacrifice fly, allowing the Marlins to tie the game in the ninth and win in the 11th on a walk-off single by Edgar Renteria that deflected off the glove of Indians pitcher Charles Nagy. The Indians failed to return to the World Series in 1998, losing the ALCS in six games. In 1999, the Indians went up 2–0 against the Boston Red Sox in the ALDS, only to give up 44 runs in the last three games of the series en route to a loss.

After winning division titles six times in seven seasons from 1995 to 2001, the Indians only appeared in the postseason twice in 14 years under the often frugal Dolan family ownership (Larry Dolan bought the team in 2000). In the 2007 American League Championship Series, the Indians were up 3–1 and one win away from advancing to the World Series, but they lost the last three games to the Boston Red Sox by a combined score of 30–5, denying the team a World Series berth. In 2013, the Indians won their final ten games of the season to make the playoffs again, but lost the Wild Card game to the Tampa Bay Rays.

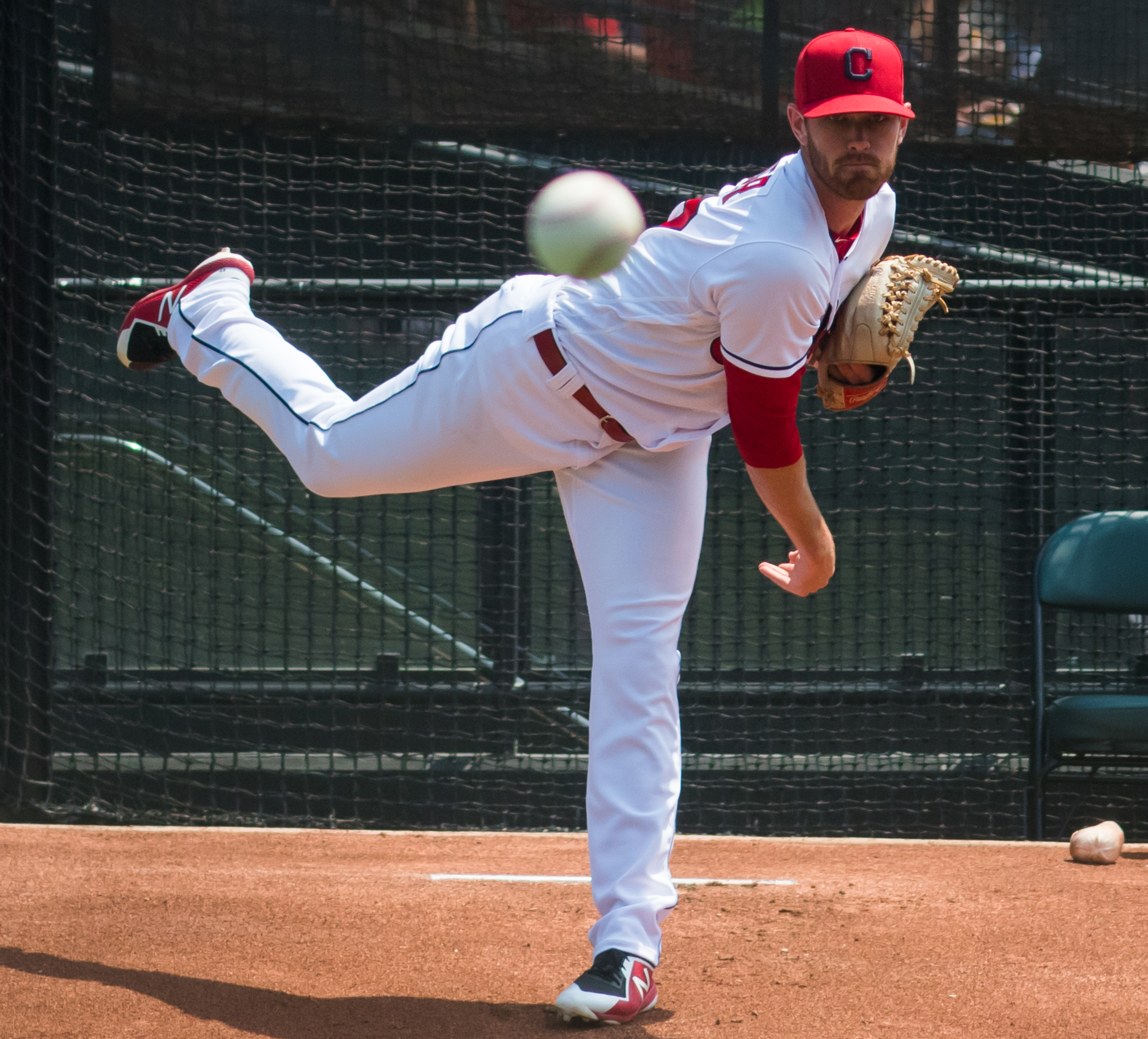
Shane Bieber of the Cleveland Indians.

Even after the Cavaliers 2016 NBA title, the Indians continued to come up short in the playoffs. Later that same year, the Indians advanced to the World Series, giving Cleveland a chance to become the first city since Los Angeles in 1988 to have both NBA and MLB championships in the same year. The Indians held a 3–1 lead against the Chicago Cubs, but the Cubs rallied to win the last three games to break their own curse; as a result, the Indians became the team with the longest active championship drought in baseball. Cleveland’s drought now stands at 78 seasons.

In 2017, the Indians returned to the playoffs as a heavy favorite to return to the World Series. They won 102 games, highlighted by an American League record 22-game winning streak. However, the Indians lost the Division Series to the New York Yankees 3–2. Cleveland returned to the playoffs in several times since but failed to advance past the ALCS.

== Other sports ==
The Cleveland sports curse has generally centered around its major teams. However, other teams based in Cleveland won championships during the city's major title drought, and one Greater Cleveland native won a world championship individually.

=== Cleveland Crunch ===
The Cleveland Crunch, an indoor soccer club, won three championships in the National Professional Soccer League (NPSL) during the 1990s. In 1994, the Crunch won their first title – and the first title for any professional Cleveland team in 30 years – defeating the St. Louis Ambush 3–1 in a best-of-five championship series. The team went on to win two more titles, in 1996 and 1999, before the league disbanded in 2001. The Crunch would eventually be revived in 2020, playing in the Major Arena Soccer League 2 (M2), and in their first season won the 2021 M2 Championship.

=== Lake Erie Monsters ===
On June 11, 2016, the Lake Erie Monsters of the American Hockey League won the Calder Cup, defeating the Hershey Bears at Quicken Loans Arena to win the series 4–0. The team, also owned by Dan Gilbert, shares its arena with the Cavaliers, who won the NBA title eight days later.

It was the 10th overall Calder Cup won by a Cleveland team. The original Cleveland Barons that played from 1937 to 1973 won it nine times, with the last in 1964 - coincidentally the last time one of the major sports franchises in the city won a championship prior to the 2016 Cavaliers.

=== Stipe Miocic ===
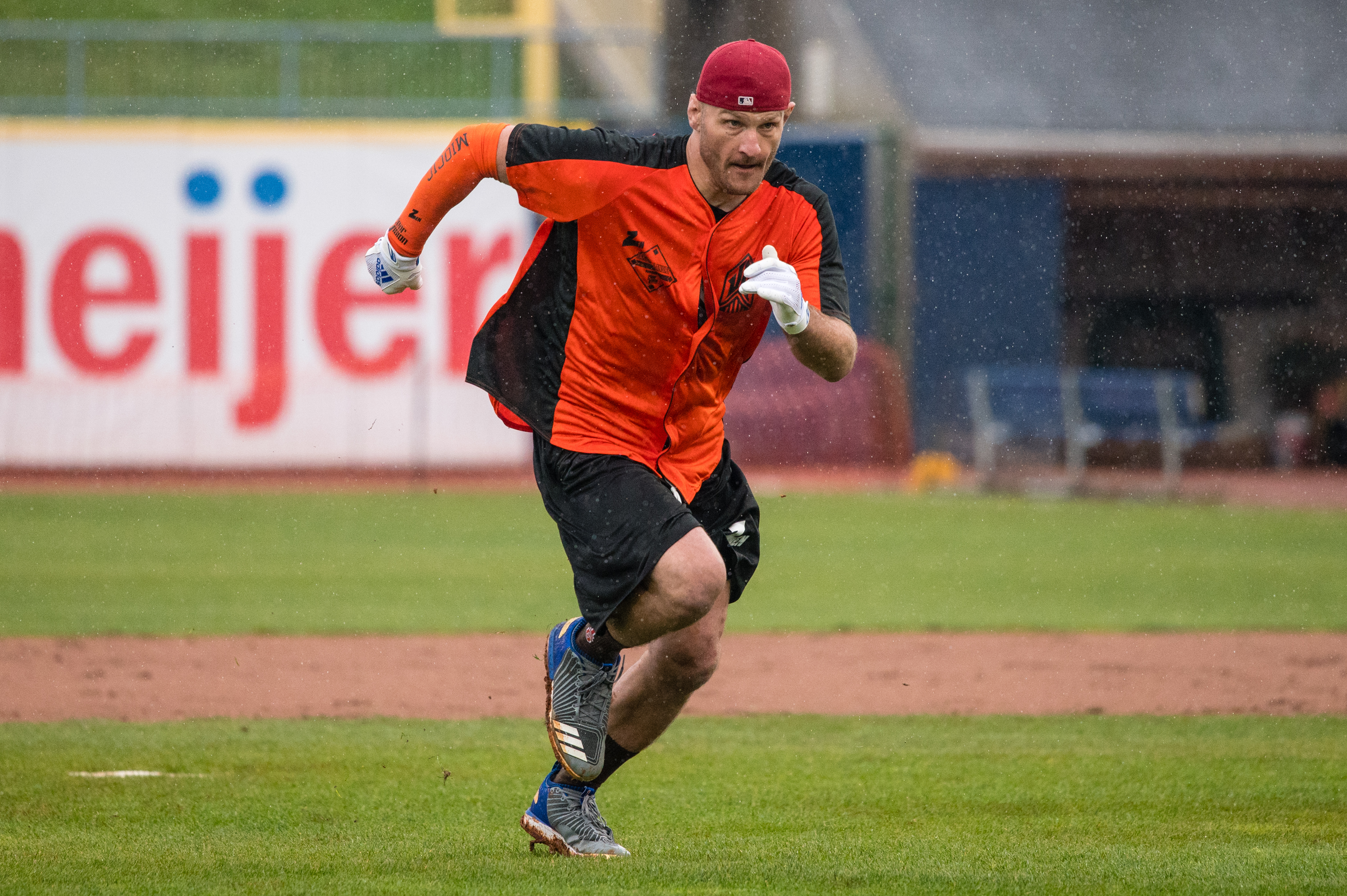
Stipe Miocic in 2019.

On May 14, 2016, mixed martial artist Stipe Miocic, a native of Euclid, a Cleveland suburb, won the UFC Heavyweight Championship at UFC 198 in Curitiba, Brazil, knocking out Brazil's Fabricio Werdum. Three hours prior, ESPN had aired a 30 for 30 episode called "Believeland," documenting Cleveland's major-league title drought. The Indians and Cavaliers Twitter accounts congratulated him shortly afterwards. They and the Browns had earlier wished him luck. He tweeted encouragement to the Cavaliers, who hoped to keep the winning streak alive in the 2016 NBA Playoffs. Some media outlets characterized Miocic's title as having ended Cleveland's 52-year championship drought, as well as Miocic himself in the post-fight interview. Most either continued to portray the curse as ongoing with the Cavaliers poised to break it, or recognized the Cavaliers as having ended the title drought following their win in the 2016 NBA Finals.
