= The Fumble =

Notable NFL play in 1987

1987 AFC Championship Game
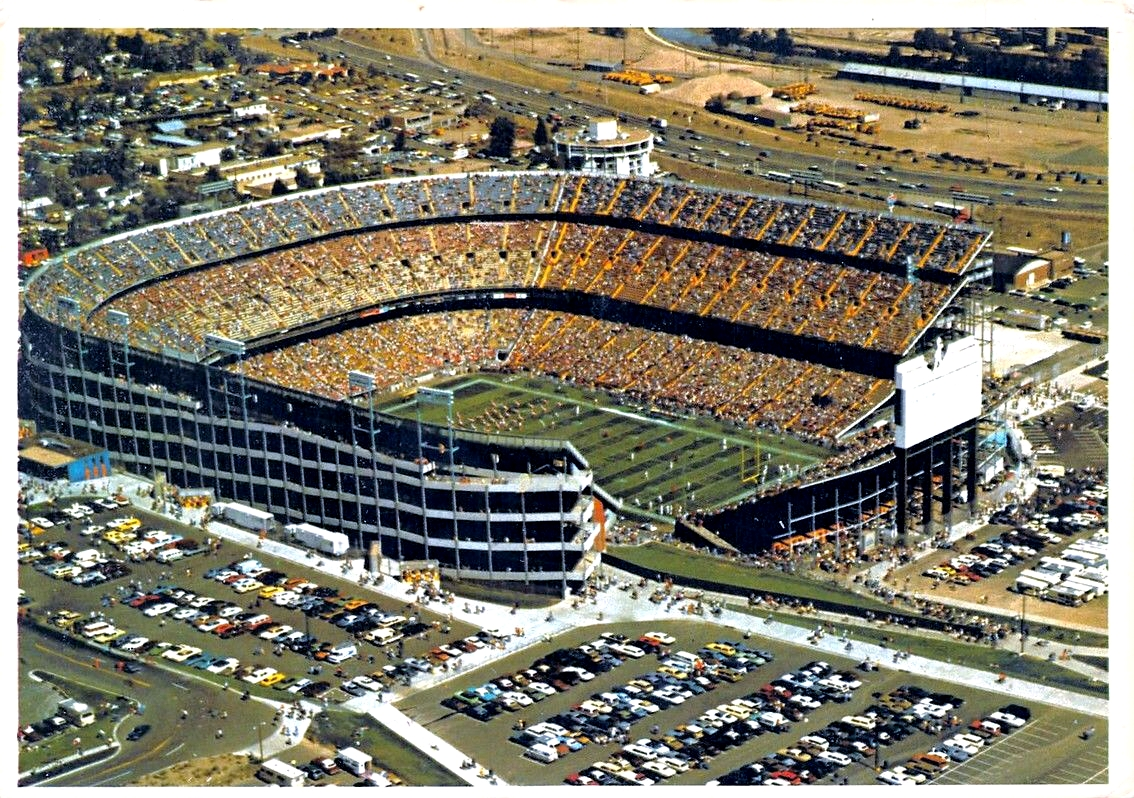
- Mile High Stadium in Denver, Colorado, the site of the game.
Cleveland Browns (2) (10–5)	Denver Broncos (1) (10–4–1)
33	38
Head coach: Marty Schottenheimer	Head coach: Dan Reeves
	1	2	3	4	Total
CLE	0	3	21	9	33
DEN	14	7	10	7	38
- Date: January 17, 1988
- Stadium: Mile High Stadium; Denver, Colorado
- Favorite: Broncos by 3
- Referee: Jim Tunney

TV in the United States
- Network: NBC
- Announcers: Dick Enberg (play-by-play) and Merlin Olsen (color commentator)

In American football, The Fumble is a play that occurred during the 1987 AFC Championship Game between the Cleveland Browns and Denver Broncos on January 17, 1988, at Mile High Stadium in Denver, Colorado. The fumble occurred late in the fourth quarter of the game and cost the Browns a chance to tie the contest; the Broncos went on to win the game and the AFC Championship, advancing to Super Bowl XXII.

== Background ==
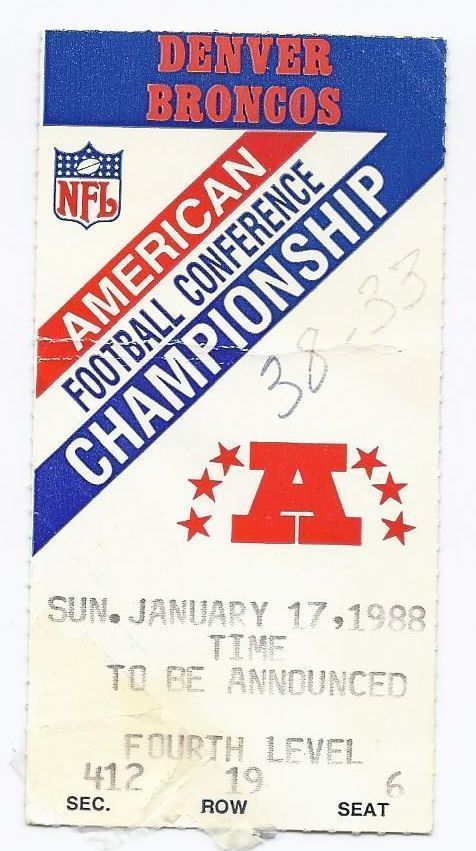
A ticket for the AFC Championship Game between the Browns and the Broncos.

One year earlier, the Browns and Broncos faced off for the conference championship at Cleveland Municipal Stadium. Broncos quarterback John Elway led a game-tying, 98-yard touchdown drive that became known as simply The Drive, which sent the game into overtime where the Broncos won.

For this matchup, things were not initially as close. The Broncos scored two early touchdowns on a pass from Elway to Ricky Nattiel and a run by Steve Sewell. They added a run by Gene Lang in the second quarter, while all the Browns were able to do was produce a field goal by Matt Bahr.

The second half, though, was a different story for the Browns. Trailing 21–3 entering the third quarter, quarterback Bernie Kosar and his star halfback Earnest Byner helped lead the Browns back. Kosar threw a third quarter touchdown to Reggie Langhorne, and after the Broncos added a touchdown, Byner added two of his own via a pass from Kosar and a run. A Rich Karlis field goal closed the scoring in the third quarter, and the Broncos’ lead was reduced to seven.

Kosar led another touchdown drive in the fourth quarter that culminated with Webster Slaughter catching a four-yard pass to tie the game at 31. After Elway responded by finding Sammy Winder for a touchdown to regain the lead, the Browns again began moving the ball down the field. They managed, once again, to cross the fifty-yard line and drive deep into Denver territory.

== The play ==
On second down at the Denver eight-yard line, with the Browns needing five yards for a first down, Kosar handed the ball off to Byner on a trap play. With the running lane he intended to use overrun with Broncos defenders, Byner turned and headed left and found space. He had the first down and saw a chance to score the tying touchdown. The only two defenders between him and the end zone were Broncos defensive backs Jeremiah Castille and Tony Lilly. Browns wide receiver, Webster Slaughter, did not block Castille. Browns Coach Marty Schottenheimer cited that as a reason that Castille had a clean hit on Byner. As Castille closed the gap to meet Byner, Byner instead of continuing to veer left straightened his run to avoid running directly into Castille. Although Castille did not stop Byner's progress and bring him to the ground, Castille managed to knock the football out of Byner's hands at the three-yard line. Byner's momentum carried him forward into the end zone, colliding with Lilly. Castille recovered the fumble at the three-yard line, giving the Broncos possession of the ball and preserving the seven-point edge.

=== Aftermath ===
The Broncos ran three plays to gain a total of nine yards while forcing the Browns to use their remaining time outs. On the ensuing fourth down, Broncos coach Dan Reeves had his punter, Mike Horan, take an intentional safety rather than punt out of his own end zone; Horan did as he was told and ran around in the end zone for five seconds for good measure.

After the ensuing free kick, the Browns were thwarted on their last drive, when a Kosar Hail Mary pass came up short; the Broncos won, 38–33, and moved on to the Super Bowl, where they lost to the Washington Redskins, 42–10.

== Reactions ==
On ESPN Classic's "The Fumble, the Story of the 1987 AFC Championship", the Browns' then-head coach Marty Schottenheimer analyzed the play, showing that the fumble was not entirely Byner's fault. Schottenheimer stated: "The Browns' wide receiver #84, Webster Slaughter is supposed to take ten steps then block Castille to the outside. Instead, he wanted to watch the play."

Castille said: "I was thinking, 'I got burned the last time I tried to bump-and-run [Slaughter]', so instead I stepped back six-to-eight yards before the snap, so I could better see the play unfold. I saw it was a draw play and that Byner had the ball. I remember thinking that Byner ran all over us that entire second half, so there was no way I was going to tackle him. Instead, I went for the ball the whole time."

Schottenheimer continued: "Earnest never saw Castille coming. Earnest was the reason we were still in the game at that point. He had several heroic runs and catches over the course of the second half that allowed us to have a chance to tie the game at 38. All of these heroics, unfortunately, were overshadowed by a single draw play from the eight-yard line."

Dick Enberg, the play-by-play announcer of the broadcast on NBC, noted: "And wasn't it ironic that Denver got the ball back on the two-yard line? Wasn't it just one year ago where the Broncos were on their own two before putting together what became 'The Drive'?"

In a January 2010 article, ESPN.com Page 2 writer Bill Simmons used "The Fumble" as an argument for why the Browns should be considered one of the most cursed franchises in sports.

== Aftermath ==
Despite being primarily remembered for "The Fumble", Byner had a successful career. After spending another year with the Browns, he was traded to the Washington Redskins prior to the start of the 1989 season for running back Mike Oliphant. In his five seasons with Washington, Byner was selected to play in the Pro Bowl twice (1990, 1991) and won a Super Bowl in the 1991 season. In that season's Super Bowl XXVI, he caught a touchdown pass in the second quarter, and the Redskins won, giving him the NFL Championship ring he could not win with the Browns.

He ended up going back to Cleveland for two more years, and finished his career in 1998, after spending two years with the transplanted Baltimore Ravens. In his 14 NFL seasons, Byner rushed for 8,261 yards, caught 512 passes for 4,605 yards, and scored 72 total touchdowns (56 rushing, 15 receiving, one fumble recovery). At the time of his retirement, Byner ranked within the NFL's top 30 all-time leaders in rushing attempts, rushing touchdowns, rushing yards, and total yards.

== Game summary ==
Game summary

Quarter	1	2	3	4	Total
Browns	0	3	21	9	33
Broncos	14	7	10	7	38

at Mile High Stadium, Denver, Colorado

- Game time: 4:00 p.m. EST/2:00 p.m. MST
- Game attendance: 76,197
- Referee: Jim Tunney
- TV announcers (NBC): Dick Enberg (play-by-play) and Merlin Olsen (color commentator)

Game information
- Scoring
  - DEN – Nattiel 8 pass from Elway (Karlis kick) DEN 7–0
  - DEN – Sewell 1 run (Karlis kick) DEN 14–0
  - CLE – field goal Bahr 24 DEN 14–3
  - DEN – Lang 1 run (Karlis kick) DEN 21–3
  - CLE – Langhorne 18 pass from Kosar (Bahr kick) DEN 21–10
  - DEN – Jackson 80 pass from Elway (Karlis kick) DEN 28–10
  - CLE – Byner 32 pass from Kosar (Bahr kick) DEN 28–17
  - CLE – Byner 4 run (Bahr kick) DEN 28–24
  - DEN – field goal Karlis 38 DEN 31–24
  - CLE – Slaughter 4 pass from Kosar (Bahr kick) T 31–31
  - DEN – Winder 20 pass from Elway (Karlis kick) DEN 38–31
  - CLE – Safety, Horan ran out of end zone DEN 38–33

== Officials ==
- Referee: Jim Tunney (#32)
- Umpire: Ben Montgomery (#117)
- Head linesman: Sid Semon (#109)
- Line judge: Ron Blum (#83)
- Back judge: Roy Clymer (#24)
- Side judge: Bill Quinby (#58)
- Field judge: Dick Dolack (#31)
- Alternate: Jerry Seeman (#70)

== See also ==
- Cleveland sports curse
- 1987–88 NFL playoffs
- Red Right 88
- The Drive
