= The Drive (American football) =

Iconic event in NFL history

1986 AFC Championship Game
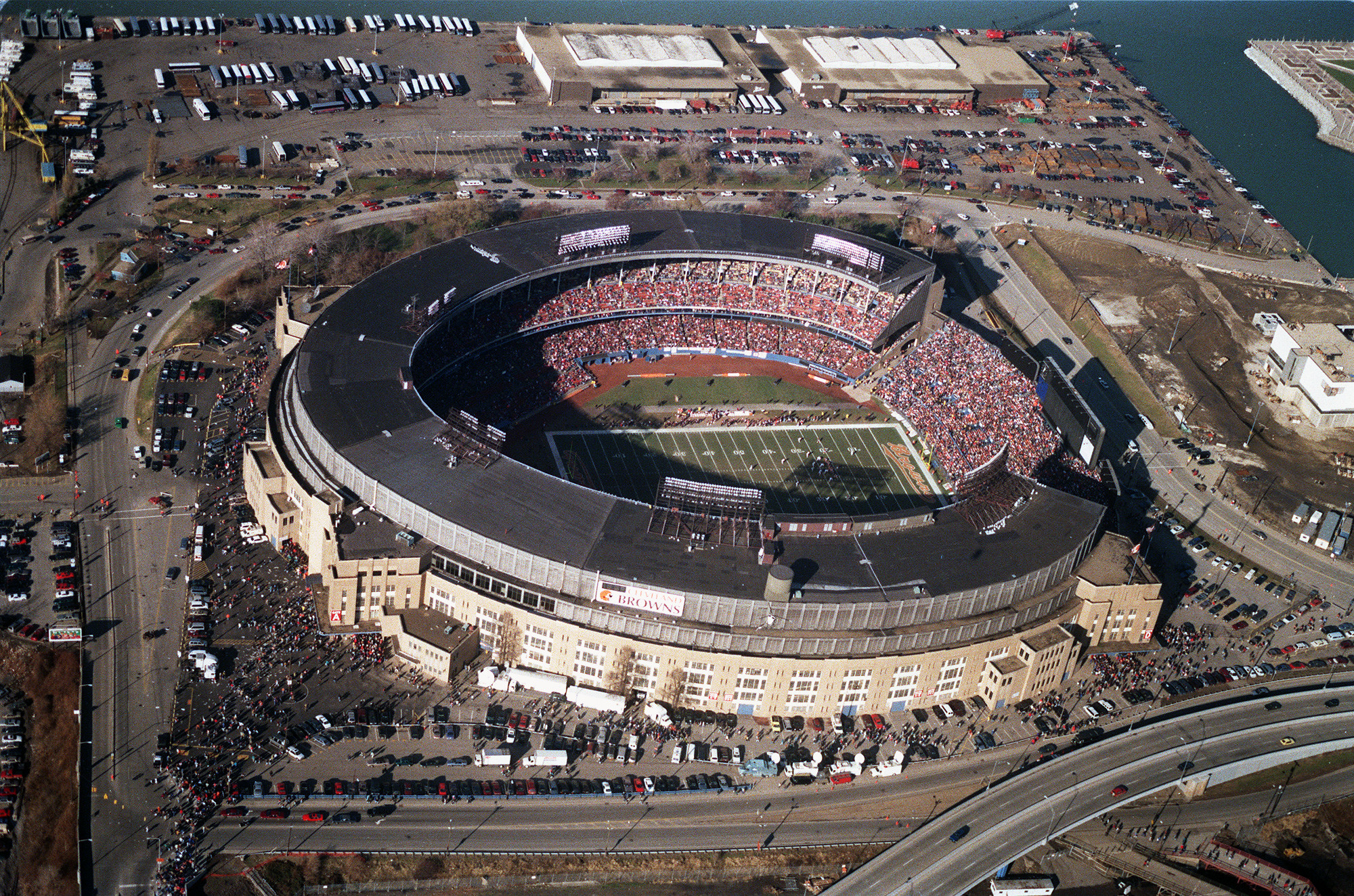
- Cleveland Municipal Stadium in Cleveland, Ohio, the site of the game.
| Denver Broncos (2) (11–5) | Cleveland Browns (1) (12–4) |
|---|---|
| 23 | 20 |
| Head coach: Dan Reeves | Head coach: Marty Schottenheimer |
| | 1 | 2 | 3 | 4 | OT | Total |
|---|---|---|---|---|---|---|
| DEN | 0 | 10 | 3 | 7 | 3 | 23 |
| CLE | 7 | 3 | 0 | 10 | 0 | 20 |
- Date: January 11, 1987
- Stadium: Cleveland Municipal Stadium; Cleveland, Ohio
- Favorite: Browns by 3
- Referee: Chuck Heberling

TV in the United States
- Network: NBC
- Announcers: Dick Enberg, Merlin Olsen, and Bob Griese

The Drive was an offensive series in the fourth quarter of the 1986 AFC Championship Game played on January 11, 1987, at Cleveland Municipal Stadium between the Denver Broncos and Cleveland Browns. Broncos quarterback John Elway, in a span of 5 minutes and 2 seconds, led his team 98 yards in 15 plays to tie the game with 37 seconds left in regulation. Denver won the game in overtime by making a 33-yard field goal, pulling off a 23–20 comeback win over the Browns. The Broncos then advanced to Super Bowl XXI, where they lost to the New York Giants, 39–20.

The 98-yard drive ranks as pro football's prototypical clutch performance. Elway and his team spanned almost all of the 100-yard football field. According to an article by Sports Illustrated columnist and Colorado resident Rick Reilly, when Elway started the drive, Broncos offensive guard Keith Bishop said of the Browns, "We got 'em right where we want 'em!" Cleveland could not force a fourth down against Denver.

The Drive is commonly seen as emblematic of the Cleveland Sports Curse, and of the Browns' inability to reach the Super Bowl since its inauguration in the 1966 season (as of 2025, the Browns' last NFL Championship came in the 1964 season, prior to the Super Bowl era.) It is often mentioned in tandem with The Fumble, which occurred in the following year's AFC Championship Game, also against the Denver Broncos, and again featured the Browns falling just short of appearing in their first Super Bowl.

== Play-by-play ==
The Browns had jumped to a 20–13 lead and Denver had muffed the ensuing kickoff when Elway took over, first-and-10 on their own 2-yard line, with 5:32 to play in regulation.

1. First down and 10, Denver 2-yard line. Sammy Winder 5-yard pass from Elway.
2. Second down and 5, Denver 7-yard line. Winder 3-yard run.
3. Third down and 2, Denver 10-yard line. Winder 2-yard run.
4. First down and 10, Denver 12-yard line. Winder 3-yard run.
5. Second down and 7, Denver 15-yard line. Elway 11-yard run.
6. First down and 10, Denver 26-yard line. Steve Sewell 22-yard pass from Elway.
7. First down and 10, Denver 48-yard line. Steve Watson 12-yard pass from Elway.
  1. Two-minute warning
8. First down and 10, Cleveland 40-yard line (1:59 left). Incomplete pass by Elway, intended for Vance Johnson.
9. Second down and 10, Cleveland 40-yard line (1:52 left). Dave Puzzuoli sack of Elway, 8-yard loss.
10. Third down and 18, Cleveland 48-yard line (1:47 left). Mark Jackson 20-yard pass from Elway.
11. First down and 10, Cleveland 28-yard line (1:19 left). Incomplete pass by Elway, intended for Watson.
12. Second down and 10, Cleveland 28-yard line (1:10 left). Steve Sewell 14-yard pass from Elway.
13. First down and 10, Cleveland 14-yard line (:57 left). Incomplete pass by Elway, intended for Watson.
14. Second down and 10, Cleveland 14-yard line (:42 left). John Elway 9-yard run (scramble).
15. Third down and 1, Cleveland 5-yard line (:39 left). Mark Jackson 5-yard pass from Elway for the touchdown. Rich Karlis then adds the extra point to tie the game.

== Game summary ==
Game summary

| Quarter | 1 | 2 | 3 | 4 | OT | Total |
|---|---|---|---|---|---|---|
| Broncos | 0 | 10 | 3 | 7 | 3 | 23 |
| Browns | 7 | 3 | 0 | 10 | 0 | 20 |

at Cleveland Stadium, Cleveland, Ohio

- Game time: 12:30 p.m. EST
- Game attendance: 79,973
- Referee: Chuck Heberling
- TV announcers (NBC): Dick Enberg (play-by-play) Merlin Olsen and Bob Griese (color commentators)

Game information
- Scoring
  - CLE – Fontenot 6 pass from Kosar (Moseley kick) CLE 7–0
  - DEN – field goal Karlis 19 CLE 7–3
  - DEN – Willhite 1 run (Karlis kick) DEN 10–7
  - CLE – FG Moseley 29 tie, 10–10
  - DEN – FG Karlis 26 DEN 13–10
  - CLE – FG Moseley 24 tie, 13–13
  - CLE – Brennan 48 pass from Kosar (Moseley kick) CLE 20–13
  - DEN – M. Jackson 5 pass from Elway (Karlis kick) tie, 20–20
  - DEN – FG Karlis 33 DEN 23–20

== Officials ==
- Referee: Chuck Heberling (46)
- Umpire: Gordon Wells (89)
- Head linesman: Ed Marion (26)
- Line judge: Bill Reynolds (53)
- Back judge: Ben Tompkins (52)
- Side judge: Gary Lane (120)
- Field judge: Johnny Grier (23)

== In popular culture ==
The Drive was featured in the movie Hot Tub Time Machine, but due to the butterfly effect, Jackson was distracted by a squirrel and failed to catch a pass and Cleveland went on to win. It was inaccurately portrayed as being in 1986 (the game was played on January 11, 1987, though it was at the end of the 1986 NFL season). The movie implied that it was played at night; however, when Karlis kicked the winning field goal in overtime, it was still daytime in Cleveland (the AFC title game was the early conference championship game that year, as the NFC title game between the New York Giants and Washington Redskins took place later and saw nearly the entire game played after the sun had set).

== See also ==
- Cleveland sports curse
- 1986–87 NFL playoffs
- The Fumble
- Red Right 88
