= 2012 NBA playoffs =

Postseason tournament

Tournament details
- Dates: April 28–June 21, 2012
- Season: 2011–12
- Teams: 16

Final positions
- Champions: Miami Heat (2nd title)
- Runners-up: Oklahoma City Thunder
- Semifinalists: Boston Celtics; San Antonio Spurs

Tournament statistics
- Scoring leader(s): LeBron James (Heat) (30.3 PPG)

Awards
- MVP: LeBron James (Heat)

The 2012 NBA playoffs was the postseason tournament of the National Basketball Association's 2011–12 season. The tournament concluded with the Eastern Conference champion Miami Heat defeating the Western Conference champion Oklahoma City Thunder, 4 games to 1 in the NBA Finals. LeBron James was named NBA Finals MVP.

The Dallas Mavericks were the defending champions, but lost in the first round to the Thunder in a four-game sweep.

== Overview ==
=== Western Conference ===
The Los Angeles Clippers made the playoffs for the first time since 2006, while the Utah Jazz returned after a one-year hiatus. It was also Utah's first postseason appearance without Jerry Sloan as head coach since 1988. Ironically, both teams would be swept by the San Antonio Spurs.

The San Antonio Spurs entered their fifteenth consecutive postseason, continuing the longest active playoff streak at the time.

The defending champion Dallas Mavericks entered their twelfth consecutive postseason, the second longest active playoff streak in the Western Conference.

The Memphis Grizzlies earned home–court advantage for the first time in franchise history.

=== Eastern Conference ===
All eight teams were the same from 2011. They also all had records over .500, the first time since 2005.

The Orlando Magic entered their sixth consecutive postseason, the longest active postseason streak in the eastern conference at the time. Their in–state rivals, the Miami Heat entered their fourth consecutive postseason. The Orlando Magic and Miami Heat gained notoriety for opening their postseason runs against the Indiana Pacers and New York Knicks despite recent tragedies rocking their respective cities. The Orlando Magic opened their NBA Playoffs against the Indiana Pacers just 2 months after the killing of Trayvon Martin in nearby Sanford, Florida, just 30 miles from where they play their games at Amway Center (now called the Kia Center). Meanwhile, the Miami Heat opened their NBA Playoffs against the New York Knicks just 15 days after a drunk driver caused a devastating crash in southwest Miami-Dade County, just 18 miles from where they play their games at American Airlines Arena (now called the Kaseya Center)

The Indiana Pacers opened the playoffs at home for the first time since 2004.

The New York Knicks and Philadelphia 76ers entered their second consecutive postseason.

=== First round ===
For the first time since 2000, the Miami Heat and the New York Knicks met in the postseason, reigniting the Heat–Knicks rivalry.

For the fourth time since 2006, a division winner (in this case the Atlantic Division champion Boston Celtics) opened the playoffs on the road. Despite not having home court advantage, the Boston Celtics beat the Atlanta Hawks in six games. The Hawks did not open the playoffs at home again until 2015.

Game 1 of the Bulls–Sixers series was extremely notable as Derrick Rose tore his ACL in the waning minutes of the Bulls’ 103–91 victory.

With their Game 3 loss to the Miami Heat, the New York Knicks lost their 13th straight playoff game, breaking Memphis' record from 2004 to 2006 for the longest playoff losing streak. However, they broke that streak with a Game 4 victory against The Heat at Madison Square Garden.

With their Game 4 loss to the Oklahoma City Thunder, the defending champions Dallas Mavericks were swept in the first round, becoming the third defending champion to be swept in the First Round after the Philadelphia Warriors in 1957 and Miami Heat in 2007, and second after Miami to be done so in a seven-game series. It was the first time the Mavericks were swept in a seven-game series, and only their second sweep since 1990.

With their Game 5 win against the New York Knicks, the Miami Heat beat their arch rivals in a playoff series for the first time since 1997. During the series, however, the Knicks lost Baron Davis and Iman Shumpert to knee injuries.

With their Game 5 win against the Orlando Magic, the Indiana Pacers won their first playoff series since 2005. The Magic did not return to the postseason until 2019.

With their Game 6 win over the Chicago Bulls, the eighth–seeded Philadelphia 76ers became only the 5th eighth seeded team in NBA history to beat a top seed in the first round. Following the Grizzlies' 2011 upset of the 1st–seeded Spurs, this marked the first time in straight seasons an 8th–seed upset a #1 seed. In addition to losing Rose, the Bulls also lost Joakim Noah to injury during the series. This was the most recent occurrence of an eighth seed eliminating a top seed in the first round of the playoffs until 2023, when the eighth-seeded Miami Heat knocked out the top-seeded Milwaukee Bucks.

Game 7 of the Lakers–Nuggets series ensured a 13th straight postseason with at least one Game 7 played. The last without one was the 1999 NBA playoffs.

With their Game 7 win over the Memphis Grizzlies, the Los Angeles Clippers won their first playoff series since 2006.

=== Conference semifinals ===
During their conference semifinals series against the Indiana Pacers, the Miami Heat lost Chris Bosh to injury (although he would return in Game 5 of the Eastern Conference Finals). As a result, the Heat fell behind two games to one before reeling off three straight wins to beat the Pacers in six games.

For the first time since 1999, back to backs were played in the conference semifinals, thanks to the Los Angeles Lakers and the Los Angeles Clippers sharing the same arena to avoid scheduling conflicts. It also marked the first time both Los Angeles teams appeared in the Conference Semifinals in the same season. As of 2023, this was the most recent occurrence of back to backs being played in the same postseason.

With their Game 4 win over the Los Angeles Clippers, the San Antonio Spurs became the fourth team in NBA History (and first in the Western Conference) to go 8–0 through the first two rounds of the playoffs. The Heat in 2005, Cavs in 2009 and Magic in 2010, also went 8–0 through the first two rounds. In addition, all 3 lost Game 1 of their Conference Finals. The Spurs broke this trend with a Game 1 win over the Oklahoma City Thunder in the Western Conference Finals.

Game 5 of the Thunder–Lakers series was Kobe Bryant's final NBA playoff game. In addition, this was also his final NBA Playoff appearance before his retirement in 2016.

With their Game 7 win over the Philadelphia 76ers, the Boston Celtics returned to the Conference Finals for the third time in five seasons. With the loss, the Philadelphia 76ers suffered the same fate as last season's Memphis Grizzlies by beating a top seed, taking their fourth seed opponent to a Game 7, only to lose on the road. The 76ers did not return to the playoffs until 2018.

=== Conference finals ===
For the third consecutive season, the Miami Heat and the Boston Celtics met in the postseason.

With their Game 2 win over the Oklahoma City Thunder, the San Antonio Spurs won 20 straight games. As a result, they set an NBA record for the longest winning streak carried over from the regular season to the playoffs, which was broken with the Game 3 loss, and finished a win short of tying the longest unbeaten playoff run in a single postseason.

Game 5 of the Heat–Celtics series was notable for the return of Chris Bosh and the Boston Celtics overcoming a 2–0 series deficit to take a 3–2 lead going back to Boston. However, the Miami Heat would force a Game 7 thanks to LeBron James’ 45 point Game 6 performance in the Miami Heat's 98–79 win at TD Garden.

With a Game 6 win over the San Antonio Spurs, the Oklahoma City Thunder returned to the NBA Finals for the first time since 1996 (when they were known as the Seattle SuperSonics). The Spurs, on the other hand, lost the series 4–2 despite leading 2–0.

With a Game 7 win over the Boston Celtics, the Miami Heat returned to the NBA Finals for the second straight season. It marked the first time a LeBron James-led team beat the Boston Celtics in a playoff series despite trailing 3–2. With the loss, this was the second time that the Celtics lost a playoff series despite leading 3–2. The Celtics did not win another playoff series, let alone return to the conference finals, until 2017.

Game 7 of the Eastern Conference Finals was Ray Allen's last game as a member of the Boston Celtics, effectively ending their “Big 3 era,” which began in 2007.

=== NBA finals ===
The 2012 NBA Finals had several noteworthy events.

For the first time since 1998, no team from California or Texas represented the western conference in the NBA Finals. Ironically, the Oklahoma City Thunder eliminated the last three Western Conference finalists: the Dallas Mavericks, the Los Angeles Lakers, and the San Antonio Spurs, all in sequential order.

For the first time in franchise history, the Miami Heat faced a team other than the Dallas Mavericks in the NBA Finals.

Game 1 of the 2012 NBA Finals was the first NBA Finals game ever played in the State of Oklahoma. The Thunder won this game 105–94.

With a Game 5 win over the Oklahoma City Thunder, the Miami Heat won their second NBA championship. By winning the 2012 NBA Finals, the Heat became the second team to win the NBA Finals by overcoming three series deficits (2–1 in the conference semifinals, 3–2 in the conference finals, and 0–1 in the finals) in the same playoffs. The last team to accomplish this feat was the 1995 Houston Rockets. It was also the third (and final time) under the 2–3–2 format that the home team won the middle three games of the NBA Finals.

=== Connection with NBA lockout ===
In May 2012, with the Bulls, Knicks, and Heat losing players to injuries, then-Commissioner David Stern initially said there was no connection between the injuries and the lockout that compressed the regular season to 66-game in 124 days; however, he later backed off those comments, saying more research was needed.

== Format ==
The 6 division winners and 10 other teams with the most wins from each conference qualified for the playoffs. The seedings are based on each team's record; however, a division winner is guaranteed to be ranked at least fourth, regardless of record.

=== Tiebreak procedures ===
The tiebreakers that determine seedings are:

1. Division leader wins tie from team not leading a division
2. Head-to-head record
3. Division record (if all the tied teams are in the same division)
4. Conference record
5. Record vs. playoff teams, own conference
6. Record vs. playoff teams, other conference (only in 2-way tie)
7. Point differential, all games

If there were more than two teams tied, the team that wins the tiebreaker gets the highest seed, while the other teams were "re-broken" from the first step until all ties were resolved. Since the three division winners were guaranteed a spot in the top four, ties to determine the division winners had to be broken before any other ties.

== Playoff qualifying ==
=== Eastern Conference ===
Seed	Team	Record	Clinched			
Seed	Team	Record	Playoff berth	Division title	Best record in Conference	Best record in NBA
1	Chicago Bulls	50-16	March 24	April 12	April 24	April 26
2	Miami Heat	46-20	April 3	April 15	—	—
3	Indiana Pacers	42-24	April 13	—	—	—
4	Boston Celtics	39-27	April 14	April 18	—	—
5	Atlanta Hawks	40-26	April 16	—	—	—
6	Orlando Magic	37-29	April 15	—	—	—
7	New York Knicks	36-30	April 23	—	—	—
8	Philadelphia 76ers	35-31	April 19	—	—	—

— = Did not achieve

=== Western Conference ===
Seed	Team	Record	Clinched			
Seed	Team	Record	Playoff berth	Division title	Best record in Conference	Best record in NBA
1	San Antonio Spurs	50-16	March 24	April 14	April 23	—
2	Oklahoma City Thunder	47-19	April 1	April 7	—	—
3	Los Angeles Lakers	41-25 (Note: Los Angeles Lakers clinched #3 seed over Memphis Grizzlies based on winning Pacific Division.)	April 15	April 24	—	—
4	Memphis Grizzlies	41-25	April 18	—	—	—
5	Los Angeles Clippers	40-26	April 16	—	—	—
6	Denver Nuggets	38-28	April 18	—	—	—
7	Dallas Mavericks	36-30 (Note: Dallas Mavericks clinched #7 seed over Utah Jazz based on 3–1 regular season series record.)	April 19	—	—	—
8	Utah Jazz	36-30	April 22	—	—	—

— = Did not achieve

== Bracket ==
Teams in bold advanced to the next round. The numbers to the left of each team indicate the team's seeding in its conference, and the numbers to the right indicate the number of games the team won in that round. The division champions are marked by an asterisk. Home court advantage belongs to the team with the better regular season record, regardless of seed. (If two teams with the same record meet in a round, the tiebreakers used are head-to-head and record vs. opposite conference.) Teams with home court advantage are shown in italics in the chart below.

First Round	Conference Semifinals
E1	Chicago*	2
**E8**	**Philadelphia**	**4**
E8	Philadelphia	3
**E4**	**Boston***	**4**
**E4**	**Boston***	**4**
E5	Atlanta	2
**Eastern Conference**
**E3**	**Indiana**	**4**
E6	Orlando	1
E3	Indiana	2
**E2**	**Miami***	**4**
**E2**	**Miami***	**4**
E7	New York	1
**W1**	**San Antonio***	**4**
W8	Utah	0
**W1**	**San Antonio***	**4**
W5	LA Clippers	0
W4	Memphis	3
**W5**	**LA Clippers**	**4**
**Western Conference**
**W3**	**LA Lakers***	**4**
W6	Denver	3
W3	LA Lakers*	1
**W2**	**Oklahoma City***	**4**
**W2**	**Oklahoma City***	**4**
W7	Dallas	0

Conference Finals
E4	Boston*	3
**E2**	**Miami***	**4**
W1	San Antonio*	2
**W2**	**Oklahoma City***	**4**

NBA Finals
**E2**	**Miami***	**4**
W2	Oklahoma City*	1

- * Division winner
- **Bold** Series winner
- Italic Team with home-court advantage

== First round ==
All times are in Eastern Daylight Time (UTC−4)

=== Eastern Conference first round ===
==== (1) Chicago Bulls vs. (8) Philadelphia 76ers ====
TNT

April 28
1:00 pm

Recap

Philadelphia 76ers 91, Chicago Bulls 103
Scoring by quarter: 24–28, 18–25, 24–26, 25–24
Pts: Elton Brand 19; Rebs: Brand, Holiday 7 each Asts: Iguodala, Turner 5 each	Pts: Derrick Rose 23; Rebs: Joakim Noah 13; Asts: Derrick Rose 9
Chicago leads series, 1–0

United Center, Chicago
Attendance: 21,943
Referees: Derrick Stafford, Jason Phillips, Michael Smith,

TNT

May 1
8:00 pm

Recap

Philadelphia 76ers 109, Chicago Bulls 92
Scoring by quarter: 25–28, 22–27, 36–14, 26–23
Pts: Jrue Holiday 26; Rebs: Lavoy Allen 9 Asts: Holiday, Turner, Williams 6 each	Pts: Joakim Noah 21; Rebs: Joakim Noah 8 Asts: Hamilton, Noah 5 each
Series tied, 1–1

United Center, Chicago
Attendance: 22,067
Referees: Greg Willard, Courtney Kirkland, Rodney Mott,

ESPN2

May 4
8:00 pm

Recap

Chicago Bulls 74, Philadelphia 76ers 79
Scoring by quarter: 20–19, 19–21, 21–11, 14–28
Pts: Carlos Boozer 18; Rebs: Carlos Boozer 10; Asts: Richard Hamilton 7	Pts: Spencer Hawes 21; Rebs: Thaddeus Young 11; Asts: Jrue Holiday 6
Philadelphia leads series, 2–1

Wells Fargo Center, Philadelphia
Attendance: 20,381
Referees: Joe Crawford, Tony Brothers, Eric Lewis,

ABC

May 6
1:00 pm

Recap

Chicago Bulls 82, Philadelphia 76ers 89
Scoring by quarter: 15–24, 27–20, 21–20, 19–25
Pts: Carlos Boozer 23; Rebs: Taj Gibson 12; Asts: Boozer, Watson 4 each	Pts: Spencer Hawes 22; Rebs: Andre Iguodala 12; Asts: Jrue Holiday 6
Philadelphia leads series, 3–1

Wells Fargo Center, Philadelphia
Attendance: 20,412
Referees: Dan Crawford, Dick Bavetta, Marc Davis,

NBA TV

May 8
9:30 pm

Recap

Philadelphia 76ers 69, Chicago Bulls 77
Scoring by quarter: 16–17, 10–18, 22–22, 21–20
Pts: Jrue Holiday 16; Rebs: Spencer Hawes 14; Asts: Jrue Holiday 4	Pts: Luol Deng 24; Rebs: Carlos Boozer 13; Asts: C. J. Watson 7
Philadelphia leads series, 3–2

United Center, Chicago
Attendance: 22,093
Referees: Ken Mauer, Bill Kennedy, Leon Wood,

NBA TV

May 10
7:00 pm

Recap

Chicago Bulls 78, Philadelphia 76ers 79
Scoring by quarter: 22–24, 18–24, 23–15, 15–16
Pts: Deng, Hamilton 19 each Rebs: Luol Deng 17; Asts: C. J. Watson 10	Pts: Andre Iguodala 20; Rebs: Spencer Hawes 10; Asts: Andre Iguodala 7
Philadelphia wins series, 4–2

Wells Fargo Center, Philadelphia
Attendance: 20,362
Referees: Monty McCutchen, Ron Garretson, Sean Wright,

The Bulls came into the playoffs as the first overall seed for the second straight year. The 76ers, meanwhile, came into the playoffs as the team with the worst record in the playoffs. The Bulls made quick work of the 76ers, winning Game 1. However, with the Bulls leading by 12 with 1:20 to go in the fourth, Derrick Rose tore his ACL and he was ruled out for the playoffs, putting the Bulls championship hopes in serious jeopardy. The 76ers took the next three games to put the Bulls on the brink of elimination. In Game 3, Joakim Noah was injured when he stepped on Andre Iguodala's foot, ruling him out for the next two games. The Bulls staved off elimination by winning Game 5 at home. In Game 6, with the Bulls up 1 with 7 seconds to go, Ömer Aşık missed two crucial free-throws. Iguodala managed to rebound the ball and sprinted to the other side of the court. He got fouled by Aşık while going for a shot. Iguodala gave the 76ers the lead by making the free-throws. The Bulls, who were out of timeouts, had one last chance to force a Game 7 but C. J. Watson's halfcourt heave bounced off the back of the rim, giving the 76ers their first playoff series win since 2003. The Bulls, meanwhile, became the fifth first-seeded team to be upset by the eighth-seed.

- This marked the 76ers last playoff series win until 2018.

Regular-season series

Chicago won 2–1 in the regular-season series

February 1, 2012

Recap

Chicago Bulls 82, Philadelphia 76ers 98

Wells Fargo Center, Philadelphia

March 4, 2012

Recap

Chicago Bulls 96, Philadelphia 76ers 91

Wells Fargo Center, Philadelphia

March 17, 2012

Recap

Philadelphia 76ers 80, Chicago Bulls 89

United Center, Chicago, Illinois

This was the third playoff meeting between these two teams, with the Bulls winning the first two meetings.

Previous playoff series
Chicago leads 2–0 in all-time playoff series

1990

Chicago Bulls 4, Philadelphia 76ers 1

1990 Eastern Conference Semifinals

1991

Chicago Bulls 4, Philadelphia 76ers 1

1991 Eastern Conference Semifinals

==== (2) Miami Heat vs. (7) New York Knicks ====
ABC

April 28
3:30 pm

Recap

New York Knicks 67, Miami Heat 100
Scoring by quarter: 18–24, 13–30, 16–27, 20–19
Pts: J. R. Smith 17; Rebs: Carmelo Anthony 10; Asts: Carmelo Anthony 3	Pts: LeBron James 32; Rebs: Udonis Haslem 8 Asts: Mario Chalmers 9
Miami leads series, 1–0

American Airlines Arena, Miami
Attendance: 19,621
Referees: Dan Crawford, Ed Malloy, Gary Zielinski,

TNT

April 30
7:00 pm

Recap

New York Knicks 94, Miami Heat 104
Scoring by quarter: 24–27, 23–26, 22–25, 25–26
Pts: Carmelo Anthony 30; Rebs: Carmelo Anthony 9 Asts: Baron Davis 6	Pts: Dwyane Wade 25; Rebs: Udonis Haslem 8 Asts: LeBron James 9
Miami leads series, 2–0

American Airlines Arena, Miami
Attendance: 19,684
Referees: Joe Crawford, Bennie Adams, Bill Spooner,

TNT

May 3
7:00 pm

Recap

Miami Heat 87, New York Knicks 70
Scoring by quarter: 19–19, 17–21, 22–16, 29–14
Pts: LeBron James 32; Rebs: Chris Bosh 10; Asts: LeBron James 5	Pts: Carmelo Anthony 22; Rebs: Tyson Chandler 15; Asts: Baron Davis 3
Miami leads series, 3–0

Madison Square Garden, New York City
Attendance: 19,763
Referees: Mike Callahan, David Guthrie, Eddie F. Rush,

ABC

May 6
3:30 pm

Recap

Miami Heat 87, New York Knicks 89
Scoring by quarter: 18–20, 26–18, 17–26, 26–25
Pts: LeBron James 27; Rebs: Chris Bosh 9 Asts: Dwyane Wade 6	Pts: Carmelo Anthony 41; Rebs: Amar'e Stoudemire 10; Asts: Anthony, Smith 4 each
Miami leads series, 3–1

Madison Square Garden, New York City
Attendance: 19,763
Referees: Monty McCutchen, Derrick Collins, Tom Washington,

TNT

May 9
7:00 pm

Recap

New York Knicks 94, Miami Heat 106
Scoring by quarter: 24–28, 20–27, 23–26, 27–25
Pts: Carmelo Anthony 35; Rebs: Tyson Chandler 11; Asts: Mike Bibby 6	Pts: LeBron James 29; Rebs: LeBron James 8 Asts: LeBron James 7
Miami wins series, 4–1

American Airlines Arena, Miami
Attendance: 19,754
Referees: Greg Willard, James Capers, John Goble

The Heat defeated the Knicks in Game 1 by 33 points. Game 2 was much closer, even without Knicks' starting rookie guard Iman Shumpert who suffered an ACL injury the previous game, but the Heat still won by 10. In Game 3 in MSG, the Heat found themselves on the wrong end in the first half, trailing by as much as 11 points, before closing the half with a 7–0 run. The Heat led by 2 after the 3rd quarter. However, LeBron James quickly sparked an 8–0 run to start the 4th quarter, giving them a 10-point lead. The Knicks never recovered. James himself outscored the Knicks in the fourth, 17–14. By losing Game 3, the Knicks set a new league record by losing 13 straight playoff games, their last win coming April 29, 2001, in their series versus the Raptors. In Game 4, Knicks' starting guard Baron Davis injured himself in the third quarter and had to be carried off the court on a stretcher. But led by Carmelo Anthony's 41, the Knicks won 89–87, escaping a sweep as Wade's potential series-winning 3 missed at the buzzer. In Game 5, the Knicks started strong but Miami took over the rest of the way. The Heat led by 11 at the end of the first half. The Heat never squandered the lead, effectively sealing the game and the series with a 3-pointer by Battier that gave the Heat a 14-point lead with a minute left in the game. The Knicks were led by Anthony's 35. Amar'e Stoudemire, meanwhile, was plagued by foul trouble. He fouled out with about 4 minutes left in the game.

- This is the last playoff match-up between Miami & New York until 2023.

Regular-season series

Miami won 3–0 in the regular-season series

January 27, 2012

Recap

New York Knicks 89, Miami Heat 99

American Airlines Arena, Miami

February 23, 2012

Recap

New York Knicks 88, Miami Heat 102

American Airlines Arena, Miami

April 15, 2012

Recap

Miami Heat 93, New York Knicks 85

Madison Square Garden, New York City

This was the fifth playoff meeting between these two teams, with the Knicks winning three of the first four meetings.

Previous playoff series
New York leads 3–1 in all-time playoff series

1997

Miami Heat 4, New York Knicks 3

1997 Eastern Conference Semifinals

1998

Miami Heat 2, New York Knicks 3

1998 Eastern Conference First Round

1999

Miami Heat 2, New York Knicks 3

1999 Eastern Conference First Round

2000

Miami Heat 3, New York Knicks 4

2000 Eastern Conference Semifinals

==== (3) Indiana Pacers vs. (6) Orlando Magic ====
ESPN

April 28
7:00 pm

Recap

Orlando Magic 81, Indiana Pacers 77
Scoring by quarter: 21–22, 30–22, 13–19, 17–14
Pts: Nelson, Richardson 17 each Rebs: Glen Davis 13; Asts: Jameer Nelson 9	Pts: David West 19; Rebs: Roy Hibbert 13; Asts: Darren Collison 5
Orlando leads series, 1–0

Bankers Life Fieldhouse, Indianapolis
Attendance: 18,165
Referees: Ken Mauer, David Jones, Leon Wood,

NBA TV

April 30
7:30 pm

Recap

Orlando Magic 78, Indiana Pacers 93
Scoring by quarter: 21–24, 23–18, 13–30, 21–21
Pts: Glen Davis 18; Rebs: Glen Davis 10; Asts: Nelson, Redick, Richardson 3 each	Pts: Granger, Hill, West 18 each Rebs: Roy Hibbert 13; Asts: David West 4
Series tied, 1–1

Bankers Life Fieldhouse, Indianapolis
Attendance: 18,165
Referees: Derrick Stafford, Bill Kennedy, Gary Zielinski,

NBA TV

May 2
7:30 pm

Recap

Indiana Pacers 97, Orlando Magic 74
Scoring by quarter: 23–14, 21–24, 32–17, 21–19
Pts: Danny Granger 26; Rebs: Roy Hibbert 10; Asts: Paul George 4	Pts: Glen Davis 22; Rebs: Quentin Richardson 10; Asts: Jameer Nelson 5
Indiana leads series, 2–1

Amway Center, Orlando, Florida
Attendance: 18,846
Referees: Dan Crawford, Bennie Adams, Bill Spooner,

ESPN

May 5
2:00 pm

Recap

Indiana Pacers 101, Orlando Magic 99 (OT)
Scoring by quarter: 22–19, 24–25, 27–17, 16–28, Overtime: 12–10
Pts: David West 26; Rebs: David West 12; Asts: Darren Collison 9	Pts: Jason Richardson 25; Rebs: Glen Davis 11; Asts: Jameer Nelson 11
Indiana leads series, 3–1

Amway Center, Orlando, Florida
Attendance: 18,846
Referees: Mike Callahan, Ed Malloy, Violet Palmer,

NBA TV

May 8
7:00 pm

Recap

Orlando Magic 87, Indiana Pacers 105
Scoring by quarter: 19–28, 28–22, 24–19, 16–36
Pts: Jameer Nelson 27; Rebs: Glen Davis 8 Asts: Jameer Nelson 5	Pts: Danny Granger 25; Rebs: David West 8 Asts: Darren Collison 6
Indiana wins series, 4–1

Bankers Life Fieldhouse, Indianapolis
Attendance: 18,165
Referees: Monty McCutchen, Marc Davis, David Guthrie,

The Pacers were considered the heavy favorites in the series as the Magic would try to defeat the Pacers without Dwight Howard. The Magic defied the odds in Game 1, as the Pacers went scoreless in the final 4 minutes of the game, allowing the Magic to go on an 11–0 run to finish the game and take a 1–0 series lead. The Pacers quickly took revenge, winning the next two games at home and on the road by an average of 19 points. Game 4 was close, with the game going to overtime. However, George Hill hit two free-throws with 2 seconds left to give the Pacers a 3–1 lead in the series. Game 5 was close throughout the first three quarters, with Magic taking a two-point lead heading to the 4th quarter. However, Indiana outscored the Magic 36–16 in the fourth to give the Pacers the series victory 4–1. This would be last playoff appearance for the Magic until 2019.

Regular-season series

Orlando won 3–1 in the regular-season series

January 24, 2012

Recap

Orlando Magic 102, Indiana Pacers 83

Bankers Life Fieldhouse, Indianapolis

January 29, 2012

Recap

Indiana Pacers 106, Orlando Magic 85

Amway Center, Orlando, Florida

February 4, 2012

Recap

Orlando Magic 85, Indiana Pacers 81

Bankers Life Fieldhouse, Indianapolis

March 11, 2012

Recap

Indiana Pacers 94, Orlando Magic 107

Amway Center, Orlando, Florida

This was the third playoff meeting between these two teams, with each team winning one series apiece.

Previous playoff series
Tied 1–1 in all-time playoff series

1994

Indiana Pacers 3, Orlando Magic 0

1994 Eastern Conference First Round

1995

Indiana Pacers 3, Orlando Magic 4

1995 Eastern Conference Finals

==== (4) Boston Celtics vs. (5) Atlanta Hawks ====
TNT

April 29
7:00 pm

Recap

Boston Celtics 74, Atlanta Hawks 83
Scoring by quarter: 18–31, 17–18, 18–16, 21–18
Pts: Garnett, Rondo 20 each Rebs: Kevin Garnett 12; Asts: Rajon Rondo 11	Pts: Josh Smith 22; Rebs: Josh Smith 18; Asts: Joe Johnson 5
Atlanta leads series, 1–0

Philips Arena, Atlanta
Attendance: 19,292
Referees: Mike Callahan, Marc Davis, John Goble,

NBA TV

May 1
7:30 pm

Recap

Boston Celtics 87, Atlanta Hawks 80
Scoring by quarter: 24–24, 17–20, 20–22, 26–14
Pts: Paul Pierce 36; Rebs: Paul Pierce 14; Asts: Kevin Garnett 5	Pts: Joe Johnson 22; Rebs: Josh Smith 12; Asts: Johnson, Smith 5 each
Series tied, 1–1

Philips Arena, Atlanta
Attendance: 19,308
Referees: Scott Foster, Ed Malloy, Scott Wall,

ESPN

May 4
7:30 pm

Recap

Atlanta Hawks 84, Boston Celtics 90 (OT)
Scoring by quarter: 19–17, 19–23, 20–20, 22–20, Overtime: 4–10
Pts: Joe Johnson 29; Rebs: Marvin Williams 11; Asts: Jeff Teague 6	Pts: Paul Pierce 21; Rebs: Rajon Rondo 14; Asts: Rajon Rondo 12
Boston leads series, 2–1

TD Garden, Boston
Attendance: 18,624
Referees: Monty McCutchen, Ron Garretson, Zach Zarba,

TNT

May 6
7:00 pm

Recap

Atlanta Hawks 79, Boston Celtics 101
Scoring by quarter: 19–32, 22–32, 22–26, 16–11
Pts: Josh Smith 15; Rebs: Josh Smith 13; Asts: Josh Smith 5	Pts: Paul Pierce 24; Rebs: Allen, Bass, Garnett 5 each Asts: Rajon Rondo 16
Boston leads series, 3–1

TD Garden, Boston
Attendance: 18,624
Referees: Joe Crawford, Tony Brothers, Pat Fraher,

TNT

May 8
8:00 pm

Recap

Boston Celtics 86, Atlanta Hawks 87
Scoring by quarter: 21–15, 19–25, 24–26, 22–21
Pts: Garnett, Pierce 16 each Rebs: Bass, Garnett 7 each Asts: Rajon Rondo 12	Pts: Al Horford 19; Rebs: Josh Smith 16; Asts: Josh Smith 6
Boston leads series, 3–2

Philips Arena, Atlanta
Attendance: 19,319
Referees: Dan Crawford, David Jones, Tom Washington,

TNT

May 10
8:00 pm

Recap

Atlanta Hawks 80, Boston Celtics 83
Scoring by quarter: 23–20, 18–27, 22–20, 17–16
Pts: Josh Smith 18; Rebs: Horford, Smith 9 each Asts: Jeff Teague 6	Pts: Kevin Garnett 28; Rebs: Kevin Garnett 14; Asts: Rajon Rondo 8
Boston wins series, 4–2

TD Garden, Boston
Attendance: 18,624
Referees: Derrick Stafford, Bill Kennedy, Eric Lewis,

The Hawks had homecourt advantage for the series despite being the lower seeded team by having the better season-record of the two; the Celtics took the 4th-seed by winning their division title. The Hawks won Game 1 by nine points, but the Celtics took the next three games, pushing the Hawks to the brink of elimination. Games 2 and 3 were close victories for the Celtics with Game 4 being a blowout victory for them. Game 5 in Atlanta was a close one. In the final seconds, with the Hawks up by one, Rajon Rondo stole an inbound pass, giving the Celtics a chance to finish off the Hawks. However, Josh Smith stripped a Rondo pass intended for Kevin Garnett, letting the Hawks survive and force a Game 6. In Game 6, Garnett led the Celtics to an 83–80 victory and advance. The Hawks had a chance to tie the game through free throws. However, Al Horford missed his first free throw that could have cut the lead to one. It was the Hawks' only miss at the free throw line the entire night. He made his second to cut it to one and the Hawks quickly fouled Paul Pierce. Pierce made both free throws to extend Celtics' lead to 3. With a chance to tie the game, Jeff Teague fumbled a pass, sealing the series for Boston.

Regular-season series

Boston won 2–1 in the regular-season series

March 19, 2012

Recap

Boston Celtics 79, Atlanta Hawks 76

Philips Arena, Atlanta

April 11, 2012

Recap

Atlanta Hawks 86, Boston Celtics 88

TD Garden, Boston

April 20, 2012

Recap

Boston Celtics 92, Atlanta Hawks 97

Philips Arena, Atlanta

This was the 11th playoff meeting between these two teams, with the Celtics winning nine of the first ten meetings.

Previous playoff series
Boston leads 9–1 in all-time playoff series

1957

Boston Celtics 4, St. Louis Hawks 3

1957 NBA Finals

1958

Boston Celtics 2, St. Louis Hawks 4

1958 NBA Finals

1960

Boston Celtics 4, St. Louis Hawks 3

1960 NBA Finals

1961

Boston Celtics 4, St. Louis Hawks 1

1961 NBA Finals

1972

Atlanta Hawks 2, Boston Celtics 4

1972 Eastern Conference Semifinals

1973

Atlanta Hawks 2, Boston Celtics 4

1973 Eastern Conference Semifinals

1983

Atlanta Hawks 1, Boston Celtics 2

1983 Eastern Conference First Round

1986

Atlanta Hawks 1, Boston Celtics 4

1986 Eastern Conference Semifinals

1988

Atlanta Hawks 3, Boston Celtics 4

1988 Eastern Conference Semifinals

2008

Atlanta Hawks 3, Boston Celtics 4

2008 Eastern Conference First Round

=== Western Conference first round ===
==== (1) San Antonio Spurs vs. (8) Utah Jazz ====
ESPN

April 29
1:00 pm

Recap

Utah Jazz 91, San Antonio Spurs 106
Scoring by quarter: 22–28, 25–26, 23–31, 21–21
Pts: Paul Millsap 20; Rebs: Jefferson, Millsap 9 each Asts: Jamaal Tinsley 5	Pts: Tony Parker 28; Rebs: Tim Duncan 11; Asts: Tony Parker 8
San Antonio leads series, 1–0

AT&T Center, San Antonio
Attendance: 18,581
Referees: Monty McCutchen, Dick Bavetta, Rodney Mott,

TNT

May 2
7:00 pm

Recap

Utah Jazz 83, San Antonio Spurs 114
Scoring by quarter: 17–28, 11–25, 25–34, 30–27
Pts: Howard, Jefferson 10 each Rebs: Enes Kanter 10; Asts: Gordon Hayward 4	Pts: Tony Parker 18; Rebs: Tim Duncan 13; Asts: Tony Parker 9
San Antonio leads series, 2–0

AT&T Center, San Antonio
Attendance: 18,581
Referees: Derrick Stafford, Tony Brown, Bill Kennedy,

TNT

May 5
10:00 pm

Recap

San Antonio Spurs 102, Utah Jazz 90
Scoring by quarter: 30–28, 22–22, 23–18, 27–22
Pts: Tony Parker 27; Rebs: Tiago Splitter 8 Asts: Manu Ginóbili 10	Pts: Harris, Jefferson 21 each Rebs: Favors, Jefferson, Millsap 11 each Asts: Harris, Hayward 5 each
San Antonio leads series, 3–0

EnergySolutions Arena, Salt Lake City
Attendance: 19,911
Referees: Ken Mauer, James Capers, Leon Wood,

TNT

May 7
8:00 pm

Recap

San Antonio Spurs 87, Utah Jazz 81
Scoring by quarter: 22–19, 28–23, 18–16, 19–23
Pts: Manu Ginóbili 17; Rebs: Stephen Jackson 6 Asts: Tony Parker 3	Pts: Al Jefferson 26; Rebs: Paul Millsap 19; Asts: Devin Harris 7
San Antonio wins series, 4–0

EnergySolutions Arena, Salt Lake City
Attendance: 19,911
Referees: Scott Foster, John Goble, Jason Phillips,

The Spurs were touted the heavy favorites in the series, following their 10-game winning streak to end the regular season and their 3–1 season series victory over the Jazz. They quickly worked their way through the Jazz, scoring 31 points in the third quarter to blow the game open. They eventually won Game 1 106–91. In Game 2, the Spurs shot 10 three-pointers and shot more than 50% as they blew out the Jazz 114–83 to take a 2–0 series lead. Game 3 was close throughout the first half, with the Spurs leading only by 2 after the first half. However, the Spurs blew the game open in the second half and won by 12 to take a 3–0 lead in the series. The odds were stacked against the Jazz as no team in NBA history have managed to win a series after trailing 3–0. Notably, before Game 4 had even been played, Jazz forward Al Jefferson commented that he didn't think any team would defeat the Spurs In Game 4, it seemed like the Spurs would complete the sweep when they had a 21-point lead. However, the Jazz eventually cut the lead to just 4 with 49.4 seconds left in the fourth. However, Tony Parker and Manu Ginóbili eventually sealed the series by stealing the ball and scoring on a basket respectively. The Spurs eventually completed the sweep, winning Game 4 by 6.

Regular-season series

San Antonio won 3–1 in the regular-season series

December 31, 2011

Recap

Utah Jazz 89, San Antonio Spurs 104

AT&T Center, San Antonio

February 20, 2012

Recap

San Antonio Spurs 106, Utah Jazz 102

EnergySolutions Arena, Salt Lake City

April 8, 2012

Recap

Utah Jazz 104, San Antonio Spurs 114

AT&T Center, San Antonio

April 9, 2012

Recap

San Antonio Spurs 84, Utah Jazz 91

EnergySolutions Arena, Salt Lake City

This was the fifth playoff meeting between these two teams, with the Jazz winning three of the first four meetings.

Previous playoff series
Utah leads 3–1 in all-time playoff series

1994

San Antonio Spurs 1, Utah Jazz 3

1994 Western Conference First Round

1996

San Antonio Spurs 2, Utah Jazz 4

1996 Western Conference Semifinals

1998

San Antonio Spurs 1, Utah Jazz 4

1998 Western Conference Semifinals

2007

San Antonio Spurs 4, Utah Jazz 1

2007 Western Conference Finals

==== (2) Oklahoma City Thunder vs. (7) Dallas Mavericks ====
ESPN

April 28
9:30 pm

Recap

Dallas Mavericks 98, Oklahoma City Thunder 99
Scoring by quarter: 26–22, 25–26, 22–21, 25–30
Pts: Dirk Nowitzki 25; Rebs: Shawn Marion 8 Asts: Kidd, Terry 5 each	Pts: Russell Westbrook 28; Rebs: Kendrick Perkins 8 Asts: Russell Westbrook 5
Oklahoma City leads series, 1–0

Chesapeake Energy Arena, Oklahoma City, Oklahoma
Attendance: 18,203
Referees: Joe Crawford, Tony Brothers, David Guthrie,

TNT

April 30
9:30 pm

Recap

Dallas Mavericks 99, Oklahoma City Thunder 102
Scoring by quarter: 24–32, 26–25, 27–22, 22–23
Pts: Dirk Nowitzki 31; Rebs: Shawn Marion 8 Asts: Jason Kidd 7	Pts: Russell Westbrook 29; Rebs: Kevin Durant 10; Asts: James Harden 5
Oklahoma City leads series, 2–0

Chesapeake Energy Arena, Oklahoma City, Oklahoma
Attendance: 18,203
Referees: Ken Mauer, James Capers, Zach Zarba,

TNT

May 3
9:30 pm

Recap

Oklahoma City Thunder 95, Dallas Mavericks 79
Scoring by quarter: 32–26, 18–15, 25–16, 20–22
Pts: Kevin Durant 31; Rebs: Serge Ibaka 11; Asts: Kevin Durant 6	Pts: Dirk Nowitzki 17; Rebs: Shawn Marion 10; Asts: Jason Terry 6
Oklahoma City leads series, 3–0

American Airlines Center, Dallas
Attendance: 20,640
Referees: Greg Willard, Marc Davis, David Jones,

TNT

May 5
7:30 pm

Recap

Oklahoma City Thunder 103, Dallas Mavericks 97
Scoring by quarter: 26–24, 21–23, 21–34, 35–16
Pts: James Harden 29; Rebs: Kevin Durant 11; Asts: Russell Westbrook 6	Pts: Dirk Nowitzki 34; Rebs: Vince Carter 8 Asts: Jason Kidd 8
Oklahoma City wins series, 4–0

American Airlines Center, Dallas
Attendance: 20,533
Referees: Scott Foster, Bill Spooner, Sean Wright,

The Mavericks came into the playoffs only as the 7th-seed, one of the lowest placements for a defending champion. Game 1 was a very close affair, with both teams going back and forth in the final minutes of the fourth quarter. However, Kevin Durant scored on a one-handed jumper with just about 1 second remaining. The Mavs still tried to win but Shawn Marion failed to get a shot off at the buzzer, giving the Thunder a one-point victory and a 1–0 series lead. Game 2 was also a close one but the Thunder held on and managed to squeak a 102–99 win and 2–0 series lead over the defending champs. In Game 3, the Mavs were no match for the Thunder, with the Thunder eventually blowing out the defending champs 95–79 to send the Mavs into the brink of a sweep. In Game 4, it looked as if the Mavs would stave off elimination when they led by 13 at the end of the third quarter. However, the Thunder outscored the Mavs 35–16 in the fourth and held on for a 103–97 victory over the Mavs. Following the sweep, the Mavs became just the 3rd defending champion to be swept in the first round.

Regular-season series

Oklahoma City won 3–1 in the regular-season series

December 29, 2011

Recap

Dallas Mavericks 102, Oklahoma City Thunder 104

Chesapeake Energy Arena, Oklahoma City, Oklahoma

January 2, 2012

Recap

Oklahoma City Thunder 87, Dallas Mavericks 100

American Airlines Center, Dallas

February 1, 2012

Recap

Oklahoma City Thunder 95, Dallas Mavericks 86

American Airlines Center, Dallas

March 5, 2012

Recap

Dallas Mavericks 91, Oklahoma City Thunder 95

Chesapeake Energy Arena, Oklahoma City, Oklahoma

This was the fourth playoff meeting between these two teams, with the Mavericks winning two of the first three meetings.

Previous playoff series
Dallas leads 2–1 in all-time playoff series

1984

Dallas Mavericks 3, Seattle SuperSonics 2

1984 Western Conference First Round

1987

Dallas Mavericks 1, Seattle SuperSonics 3

1987 Western Conference First Round

2011

Dallas Mavericks 4, Oklahoma City Thunder 1

2011 Western Conference Finals

==== (3) Los Angeles Lakers vs. (6) Denver Nuggets ====
ABC

April 29
3:30 pm

Recap

Denver Nuggets 88, Los Angeles Lakers 103
Scoring by quarter: 14–27, 26–23, 24–27, 24–26
Pts: Danilo Gallinari 19; Rebs: Faried, Miller 8 each Asts: Andre Miller 7	Pts: Kobe Bryant 31; Rebs: Andrew Bynum 13; Asts: Pau Gasol 8
LA Lakers lead series, 1–0

Staples Center, Los Angeles
Attendance: 18,997
Referees: Scott Foster, Derrick Collins, Ron Garretson,

TNT

May 1
10:30 pm

Recap

Denver Nuggets 100, Los Angeles Lakers 104
Scoring by quarter: 25–32, 23–23, 26–26, 26–23
Pts: Ty Lawson 25; Rebs: Kenneth Faried 10; Asts: Andre Miller 8	Pts: Kobe Bryant 38; Rebs: Hill, Gasol 10 each Asts: Pau Gasol 5
LA Lakers lead series, 2–0

Staples Center, Los Angeles
Attendance: 18,997
Referees: Monty McCutchen, Pat Fraher, Tom Washington,

ESPN

May 4
10:30 pm

Recap

Los Angeles Lakers 84, Denver Nuggets 99
Scoring by quarter: 14–30, 25–25, 26–17, 19–27
Pts: Kobe Bryant 22; Rebs: Andrew Bynum 12; Asts: Bryant, Sessions 6 each	Pts: Ty Lawson 25; Rebs: Faried, McGee 15 each Asts: Ty Lawson 7
LA Lakers lead series, 2–1

Pepsi Center, Denver, Colorado
Attendance: 19,155
Referees: Dan Crawford, Jason Phillips, Michael Smith,

TNT

May 6
9:30 pm

Recap

Los Angeles Lakers 92, Denver Nuggets 88
Scoring by quarter: 26–28, 19–23, 25–20, 22–17
Pts: Kobe Bryant 22; Rebs: Jordan Hill 11; Asts: Bryant, Gasol 6 each	Pts: Danilo Gallinari 20; Rebs: Faried, Miller 7 each Asts: Ty Lawson 6
LA Lakers lead series, 3–1

Pepsi Center, Denver, Colorado
Attendance: 19,155
Referees: Greg Willard, David Jones, Bill Kennedy,

TNT

May 8
10:30 pm

Recap

Denver Nuggets 102, Los Angeles Lakers 99
Scoring by quarter: 26–23, 23–20, 27–22, 26–34
Pts: Andre Miller 24; Rebs: JaVale McGee 14; Asts: Lawson, Miller 8 each	Pts: Kobe Bryant 43; Rebs: Andrew Bynum 11; Asts: Ramon Sessions 6
LA Lakers lead series, 3–2

Staples Center, Los Angeles
Attendance: 18,997
Referees: Joe Crawford, Tony Brothers, Zach Zarba,

TNT

May 10
10:30 pm

Recap

Los Angeles Lakers 96, Denver Nuggets 113
Scoring by quarter: 20–30, 25–24, 23–36, 28–23
Pts: Kobe Bryant 31; Rebs: Andrew Bynum 16; Asts: Kobe Bryant 4	Pts: Ty Lawson 32; Rebs: Kenneth Faried 11; Asts: Afflalo, Gallinari 7 each
Series tied, 3–3

Pepsi Center, Denver, Colorado
Attendance: 19,770
Referees: Ken Mauer, Ed Malloy, Rodney Mott,

TNT

May 12
10:30 pm

Recap

Denver Nuggets 87, Los Angeles Lakers 96
Scoring by quarter: 24–25, 18–23, 26–21, 19–27
Pts: Lawson, Harrington 24 each Rebs: JaVale McGee 14; Asts: Andre Miller 8	Pts: Pau Gasol 23; Rebs: Andrew Bynum 18; Asts: Kobe Bryant 8
LA Lakers win series, 4–3

Staples Center, Los Angeles
Attendance: 18,997
Referees: Derrick Stafford, Mike Callahan, Bill Spooner,

The Lakers won the opening game 103–88 after Andrew Bynum had a triple-double with 10 points, 13 rebounds, and 10 blocked shots. The blocked shots broke Kareem Abdul-Jabbar's franchise record of nine, and tied the NBA playoff record set by Mark Eaton and Hakeem Olajuwon. Kobe Bryant scored 31 points and Pau Gasol added 13 points, eight rebounds and eight assists. The Lakers then won a close Game 2 but the Nuggets proceeded to blow out the Lakers in Game 3 99–84 to prevent the Lakers from taking a commanding 3–0 lead. Game 4 was close but Sessions and Blake hit pivotal 3's to put the Lakers in the lead for good and take a 3–1 series lead. Before Game 5, Bynum said that "Close-out games are actually kind of easy." The Nuggets responded by taking Game 5 102–99. The game saw the Lakers erase a 90–75 deficit with 6:35 left in the fourth quarter. In Game 6, Bryant played despite having a stomach illness, but still managed to score 31 points. However, with little contribution from Gasol and Bynum, the Nuggets forced Game 7 with a 113–96 blowout win over the Lakers. The Lakers won the series 4–3, and avoided becoming the ninth team in NBA history to be eliminated after blowing a 3–1 series lead. Gasol had 23 points, 17 rebounds and six assists, Bynum had 16 points and a playoff career-high 18 rebounds, and Steve Blake scored a playoff career-high 19 points in a 96–87 win in Game 7. The Lakers blew a 16-point lead in the second half before Gasol put the Lakers ahead for good with a tip-in basket with 6:30 left. Kobe Bryant sealed Denver's fate by hitting a 3 with 48.3 seconds left to put the Lakers up 8. Denver had 19 turnovers in the game and shot just 7-of-27 in the fourth quarter. Returning from his seven-game suspension, Metta World Peace scored 15 points, while Bryant had 17 points, and 8 assists.

Regular-season series

L.A. Lakers won 3–1 in the regular-season series

December 31, 2011

Recap

Denver Nuggets 89, Los Angeles Lakers 92

Staples Center, Los Angeles

January 1, 2012

Recap

Los Angeles Lakers 90, Denver Nuggets 99

Pepsi Center, Denver, Colorado

February 3, 2012

Recap

Los Angeles Lakers 93, Denver Nuggets 89

Pepsi Center, Denver, Colorado

April 13, 2012

Recap

Denver Nuggets 97, Los Angeles Lakers 103

Staples Center, Los Angeles

This was the sixth playoff meeting between these two teams, with the Lakers winning the first five meetings.

Previous playoff series
Los Angeles leads 5–0 in all-time playoff series

1979

Denver Nuggets 1, Los Angeles Lakers 2

1979 Western Conference First Round

1985

Denver Nuggets 1, Los Angeles Lakers 4

1985 Western Conference Finals

1987

Denver Nuggets 0, Los Angeles Lakers 3

1987 Western Conference First Round

2008

Denver Nuggets 0, Los Angeles Lakers 4

2008 Western Conference First Round

2009

Denver Nuggets 2, Los Angeles Lakers 4

2009 Western Conference Finals

- This is the most recent playoff series between the Lakers & Nuggets until 2020.

==== (4) Memphis Grizzlies vs. (5) Los Angeles Clippers ====
TNT

April 29
9:30 pm

Recap

Los Angeles Clippers 99, Memphis Grizzlies 98
Scoring by quarter: 16–34, 23–24, 25–27, 35–13
Pts: Nick Young 19; Rebs: Reggie Evans 13; Asts: Chris Paul 11	Pts: Rudy Gay 19; Rebs: Marreese Speights 9 Asts: Mike Conley Jr. 8
LA Clippers lead series, 1–0

FedExForum, Memphis, Tennessee
Attendance: 18,119
Referees: Greg Willard, Eric Lewis, Tom Washington,

TNT

May 2
9:30 pm

Recap

Los Angeles Clippers 98, Memphis Grizzlies 105
Scoring by quarter: 26–23, 21–28, 22–24, 29–30
Pts: Chris Paul 29; Rebs: Blake Griffin 9 Asts: Chris Paul 6	Pts: Rudy Gay 21; Rebs: Zach Randolph 8 Asts: Mike Conley Jr. 6
Series tied, 1–1

FedExForum, Memphis, Tennessee
Attendance: 18,119
Referees: Ken Mauer, Ron Garretson, Sean Wright,

ESPN

May 5
4:30 pm

Recap

Memphis Grizzlies 86, Los Angeles Clippers 87
Scoring by quarter: 22–23, 24–27, 25–14, 15–23
Pts: Rudy Gay 24; Rebs: Marc Gasol 10; Asts: Mike Conley Jr. 8	Pts: Chris Paul 24; Rebs: Reggie Evans 11; Asts: Chris Paul 11
LA Clippers lead series, 2–1

Staples Center, Los Angeles
Attendance: 19,060
Referees: Derrick Stafford, John Goble, Rodney Mott,

TNT

May 7
10:30 pm

Recap

Memphis Grizzlies 97, Los Angeles Clippers 101 (OT)
Scoring by quarter: 26–32, 19–19, 19–18, 23–18, Overtime: 10–14
Pts: Mike Conley Jr. 25; Rebs: Zach Randolph 9 Asts: Mike Conley Jr. 8	Pts: Blake Griffin 30; Rebs: Chris Paul 9 Asts: Griffin, Paul 7 each
LA Clippers lead series, 3–1

Staples Center, Los Angeles
Attendance: 19,167
Referees: Mike Callahan, James Capers, Scott Wall,

TNT

May 9
9:30 pm

Recap

Los Angeles Clippers 80, Memphis Grizzlies 92
Scoring by quarter: 22–36, 20–21, 23–20, 15–15
Pts: Mo Williams 20; Rebs: Blake Griffin 11; Asts: Chris Paul 4	Pts: Marc Gasol 23; Rebs: Zach Randolph 10; Asts: Mike Conley Jr. 6
LA Clippers lead series, 3–2

FedExForum, Memphis, Tennessee
Attendance: 18,119
Referees: Scott Foster, Bill Spooner, Gary Zielinski,

ESPN

May 11
9:00 pm

Recap

Memphis Grizzlies 90, Los Angeles Clippers 88
Scoring by quarter: 25–16, 17–22, 24–28, 24–22
Pts: Marc Gasol 23; Rebs: Zach Randolph 15; Asts: Mike Conley Jr. 9	Pts: Blake Griffin 15; Rebs: Reggie Evans 10; Asts: Chris Paul 7
Series tied, 3–3

Staples Center, Los Angeles
Attendance: 19,060
Referees: Dan Crawford, Marc Davis, Jason Phillips,

ABC

May 13
1:00 pm

Recap

Los Angeles Clippers 82, Memphis Grizzlies 72
Scoring by quarter: 16–13, 23–25, 16–18, 27–16
Pts: Chris Paul 19; Rebs: Kenyon Martin 10; Asts: Chris Paul 4	Pts: Gasol, Gay 19 each Rebs: Zach Randolph 12; Asts: Mike Conley Jr. 5
LA Clippers win series, 4–3

FedExForum, Memphis, Tennessee
Attendance: 18,119
Referees: Joe Crawford, Bill Kennedy, Monty McCutchen,

The Clippers rallied to win Game 1 in one of the largest comebacks in playoff history. Trailing by as many as 27, and down 95–71 with 9:13 left, the Clippers held the Grizzlies to just one field goal the rest of the game and pulled off an improbable 99–98 victory before a stunned, sold-out crowd of 18,119 at FedExForum. In Game 2, the Grizzlies avenged their embarrassing Game 1 loss by winning a close Game 2 to even the series going to Los Angeles. In Game 3, the Clippers survived a late Grizzlies rally in the final minute as Rudy Gay's 3 missed at the buzzer to give the Clippers an 87–86 victory and a 2–1 series lead. Game 4 was close, with the game going to overtime. With Chris Paul's heroics, the Clippers managed to win Game 4 and take a commanding 3–1 series lead. Back at home for Game 5, the Grizzlies tried to stave off elimination, at one point taking a 24-point lead in the third before the Clippers cut the lead again. However, the Grizzlies made sure there would be no collapse, using a 7–1 run in the final 1:44 to win Game 5 92–80. Facing elimination on the road, the Grizzlies gathered themselves, storming back from an eight-point fourth-quarter deficit to win Game 6 90–88, to force a decisive Game 7. In Game 7, the Clipper bench outscored their Grizzlies counterparts, 41–11, and it was enough as the Clippers won on the road, becoming the 6th NBA road team to do so after leading series 3–1, to advance to the semifinals against the Spurs.

Regular-season series

L.A. Clippers won 2–1 in the regular-season series

January 26, 2012

Recap

Memphis Grizzlies 91, Los Angeles Clippers 98

Staples Center, Los Angeles

March 24, 2012

Recap

Memphis Grizzlies 85, Los Angeles Clippers 101

Staples Center, Los Angeles

April 9, 2012

Recap

Los Angeles Clippers 85, Memphis Grizzlies 94

FedExForum, Memphis, Tennessee

This was the first playoff meeting between the Clippers and the Grizzlies.

== Conference semifinals ==
=== Eastern Conference semifinals ===
==== (2) Miami Heat vs. (3) Indiana Pacers ====
ABC

May 13
3:30 pm

Recap

Indiana Pacers 86, Miami Heat 95
Scoring by quarter: 23–20, 25–22, 22–28, 16–25
Pts: Hibbert, West 17 each Rebs: David West 12; Asts: Darren Collison 6	Pts: LeBron James 32; Rebs: LeBron James 15; Asts: LeBron James 5
Miami leads series, 1–0

American Airlines Arena, Miami
Attendance: 19,600
Referees: Scott Foster, Tom Washington, Sean Wright

TNT

May 15
7:00 pm

Recap

Indiana Pacers 78, Miami Heat 75
Scoring by quarter: 17–21, 16–17, 28–14, 17–23
Pts: David West 16; Rebs: George, Hibbert 11 each Asts: Danny Granger 3	Pts: LeBron James 28; Rebs: LeBron James 9 Asts: LeBron James 5
Series tied, 1–1

American Airlines Arena, Miami
Attendance: 19,828
Referees: Joe Crawford, Bennie Adams, Ed Malloy,

ESPN

May 17
7:00 pm

Recap

Miami Heat 75, Indiana Pacers 94
Scoring by quarter: 26–17, 17–26, 12–26, 20–25
Pts: Mario Chalmers 25; Rebs: Ronny Turiaf 8 Asts: Mario Chalmers 5	Pts: George Hill 20; Rebs: Roy Hibbert 18; Asts: George Hill 5
Indiana leads series, 2–1

Bankers Life Fieldhouse, Indianapolis
Attendance: 18,165
Referees: Dan Crawford, Tony Brothers, John Goble

ABC

May 20
3:30 pm

Recap

Miami Heat 101, Indiana Pacers 93
Scoring by quarter: 18–25, 28–29, 30–16, 25–23
Pts: LeBron James 40; Rebs: LeBron James 18; Asts: LeBron James 9	Pts: Danny Granger 20; Rebs: Roy Hibbert 9 Asts: Paul George 5
Series tied, 2–2

Bankers Life Fieldhouse, Indianapolis
Attendance: 18,165
Referees: Monty McCutchen, Mike Callahan, Bill Kennedy

TNT

May 22
8:00 pm

Recap

Indiana Pacers 83, Miami Heat 115
Scoring by quarter: 20–26, 20–23, 17–27, 26–39
Pts: Paul George 11; Rebs: Roy Hibbert 12; Asts: Paul George 3	Pts: LeBron James 30; Rebs: Mario Chalmers 11; Asts: LeBron James 8
Miami leads series, 3–2

American Airlines Arena, Miami
Attendance: 20,097
Referees: Derrick Stafford, Jason Phillips, Greg Willard,

ESPN

May 24
8:00 pm

Recap

Miami Heat 105, Indiana Pacers 93
Scoring by quarter: 21–28, 30–25, 28–16, 26–24
Pts: Dwyane Wade 41; Rebs: Dwyane Wade 10; Asts: LeBron James 7	Pts: David West 24; Rebs: Paul George 10; Asts: George Hill 5
Miami wins series, 4–2

Bankers Life Fieldhouse, Indianapolis
Attendance: 18,165
Referees: Scott Foster, Marc Davis, Ken Mauer,

Even though the Heat won the regular season series, 3–1, this playoff series was expected to be a close one. In Game 1, the Heat took a major blow when Chris Bosh got injured in the first half. He was expected to be out for the rest of the series. However, James and Wade took over in the second half to give the Heat the win, 95–86. In Game 2, the Heat started strong, at one point taking a 9-point lead. The Pacers answered that by outscoring the Heat 28–14 in the third quarter to take an 11-point lead going to the fourth quarter. The Heat would come back, taking a 72–71 lead with 4:11 to go. However, with James and Wade missing key chances, the Pacers tied the series with a 78–75 win. Game 3 marked one of the worst playoff games for Wade, as he scored just 5 points on 2-of-13 shooting. Without Wade's contribution, the Heat found themselves down in the series 2–1 as the Pacers blew out the Heat, 94–75. Before Game 4, the Heat regrouped and refocused on the series. The result was a 101–93 victory over the Pacers in Game 4 to tie the series at 2–2. James scored 40 in the game, to go along with 18 rebounds and 9 assists. Wade recovered from his Game 3 performance by scoring 30. In Game 5, it was the Pacers who took the major blow when Danny Granger got injured in the second quarter by stepping on James's foot. He tried to come back in the third quarter but he aggravated his injury after fouling James. Then, after the third period, West left the game with a knee injury. Without Granger and West, the Pacers were unable to stop the Heat, as the Heat won 115–83 to take a 3–2 series lead, putting them a win away from the Eastern Conference Finals. In Game 6, West and Granger started for the Pacers despite their injuries. The Pacers started strong, even taking a 19–8 lead in the first quarter. However, the third quarter was decisive, with the Heat outscoring the Pacers 28–16 to take a 79–69 lead going to the fourth quarter. Led by Wade's 41 and James's 28, the Heat won three straight, 105–93, to take the series, 4–2.

Regular-season series

Miami won 3–1 in the regular-season series

January 4, 2012

Recap

Indiana Pacers 83, Miami Heat 118

American Airlines Arena, Miami

February 14, 2012

Recap

Miami Heat 105, Indiana Pacers 90

Bankers Life Fieldhouse, Indianapolis

March 10, 2012

Recap

Indiana Pacers 91, Miami Heat 93

American Airlines Arena, Miami

March 26, 2012

Recap

Miami Heat 90, Indiana Pacers 105

Bankers Life Fieldhouse, Indianapolis

This was the second playoff meeting between these two teams, with the Pacers winning the first meeting.

Previous playoff series
Indiana leads 1–0 in all-time playoff series

2004

Indiana Pacers 4, Miami Heat 2

2004 Eastern Conference Semifinals

==== (4) Boston Celtics vs. (8) Philadelphia 76ers ====
TNT

May 12
8:00 pm

Recap

Philadelphia 76ers 91, Boston Celtics 92
Scoring by quarter: 28–18, 19–24, 24–25, 20–25
Pts: Andre Iguodala 19; Rebs: Evan Turner 10; Asts: Andre Iguodala 6	Pts: Kevin Garnett 29; Rebs: Rajon Rondo 12; Asts: Rajon Rondo 17
Boston leads series, 1–0

TD Garden, Boston
Attendance: 18,624
Referees: Greg Willard, James Capers, David Jones,

TNT

May 14
7:00 pm

Recap

Philadelphia 76ers 82, Boston Celtics 81
Scoring by quarter: 21–25, 15–13, 21–11, 25–32
Pts: Jrue Holiday 18; Rebs: Spencer Hawes 10; Asts: Andre Iguodala 7	Pts: Ray Allen 17; Rebs: Kevin Garnett 12; Asts: Rajon Rondo 13
Series tied, 1–1

TD Garden, Boston
Attendance: 18,624
Referees: Dan Crawford, Jason Phillips, Michael Smith,

TNT

May 16
7:00 pm

Recap

Boston Celtics 107, Philadelphia 76ers 91
Scoring by quarter: 28–33, 32–16, 29–17, 18–25
Pts: Kevin Garnett 27; Rebs: Kevin Garnett 13; Asts: Rajon Rondo 14	Pts: Thaddeus Young 22; Rebs: Evan Turner 8 Asts: Jrue Holiday 9
Boston leads series, 2–1

Wells Fargo Center, Philadelphia
Attendance: 20,351
Referees: Derrick Stafford, Mike Callahan, Eric Lewis,

ESPN

May 18
8:00 pm

Recap

Boston Celtics 83, Philadelphia 76ers 92
Scoring by quarter: 24–12, 22–19, 17–28, 20–33
Pts: Paul Pierce 24; Rebs: Kevin Garnett 11; Asts: Rajon Rondo 15	Pts: Iguodala, Turner 16 each Rebs: Lavoy Allen 10; Asts: Louis Williams 8
Series tied, 2–2

Wells Fargo Center, Philadelphia
Attendance: 20,411
Referees: Scott Foster, Bill Kennedy, Bill Spooner,

TNT

May 21
7:00 pm

Recap

Philadelphia 76ers 85, Boston Celtics 101
Scoring by quarter: 27–23, 23–24, 16–28, 19–26
Pts: Elton Brand 19; Rebs: Evan Turner 10; Asts: Jrue Holiday 7	Pts: Brandon Bass 27; Rebs: Bass, Garnett 6 each Asts: Rajon Rondo 14
Boston leads series, 3–2

TD Garden, Boston
Attendance: 18,624
Referees: Ken Mauer, Ed Malloy, Rodney Mott,

ESPN

May 23
8:00 pm

Recap

Boston Celtics 75, Philadelphia 76ers 82
Scoring by quarter: 19–22, 17–11, 20–27, 19–22
Pts: Paul Pierce 24; Rebs: Kevin Garnett 11; Asts: Rajon Rondo 6	Pts: Jrue Holiday 20; Rebs: Elton Brand 10; Asts: Holiday, Williams 6 each
Series tied, 3–3

Wells Fargo Center, Philadelphia
Attendance: 20,403
Referees: Joe Crawford, James Capers, Ron Garretson,

ABC

May 26
8:00 pm

Recap

Philadelphia 76ers 75, Boston Celtics 85
Scoring by quarter: 20–20, 13–21, 19–14, 23–30
Pts: Andre Iguodala 18; Rebs: Thaddeus Young 10; Asts: Jrue Holiday 9	Pts: Garnett, Rondo 18 each Rebs: Kevin Garnett 13; Asts: Rajon Rondo 10
Boston wins series, 4–3

TD Garden, Boston
Attendance: 18,624
Referees: Monty McCutchen, Tony Brothers, Mike Callahan,

The Sixers came off fresh of an upset over the injury-laden Bulls. Both the Celtics and the Sixers clinched their first round series on the same day. In Game 1, Rondo had another triple-double, but the Sixers held a 10-point lead with 10:53 left in the fourth quarter. However, the Celtics eventually came back, winning Game 1 by a point to take a 1–0 series lead. On the final possession, the Sixers were unable to foul a speedy Rondo, who dribbled out the clock. Game 2 saw the visitors lead for most of the game. With the Sixers leading 78–75 with 12 seconds to go, the Celtics squandered a chance to tie the game, as Garnett was called for an offensive foul. The Sixers then hit their final four free-throws to tie the series at 1 going back to Philadelphia. In Game 3, the Sixers held their last lead with 9:09 left in the second quarter as the Celtics took over the rest of the game to lead them to a 2–1 series advantage. In Game 4, the Celtics led by as much as 18 in the third quarter. Facing the prospect of trailing 1–3 in the series, the Sixers came back to take the game from the Celtics and tie the series going back to Boston. Game 5 saw Brandon Bass score 27 points, including 18 in the third quarter as the Celtics blew out the Sixers, 101–85, to push them a win away from the Eastern Conference Finals. Before the start of Game 6, Allen Iverson presented the game ball, prompting huge cheers from the crowd. It was enough to motivate the Sixers to defeat the Celtics 82–75 to force a Game 7. Jrue Holiday scored 20 points, including two free-throws with 31 seconds to go to put the game away. Game 7 was a tight contest, with the two teams going back-and-forth. Paul Pierce fouled out late in the fourth quarter, but Rondo had his second triple-double of the series, including a fourth quarter that helped the Celtics advance to the Conference Finals to face the Miami Heat.

This series is an important plot point in the 2019 film Uncut Gems, in which Garnett co-stars.

- Game 7 marked the 76ers last playoff appearance until 2018.
- This would also be the Celtics last playoffs series win until 2017.

Regular-season series

Philadelphia won 2–1 in the regular-season series

March 7, 2012

Recap

Boston Celtics 71, Philadelphia 76ers 103

Wells Fargo Center, Philadelphia

March 23, 2012

Recap

Boston Celtics 86, Philadelphia 76ers 99

Wells Fargo Center, Philadelphia

April 8, 2012

Recap

Philadelphia 76ers 79, Boston Celtics 103

TD Garden, Boston

This was the 20th playoff meeting between these two teams, with the Celtics winning 11 of the first 19 meetings.

Previous playoff series
Boston leads 11–8 in all-time playoff series

1953

Boston Celtics 2, Syracuse Nationals 0

1953 Eastern Division Semifinals

1954

Boston Celtics 0, Syracuse Nationals 2

1954 Eastern Division Round Robin Semifinals

1954

Boston Celtics 0, Syracuse Nationals 2

1954 Eastern Division Finals

1955

Boston Celtics 1, Syracuse Nationals 3

1955 Eastern Division Finals

1956

Boston Celtics 1, Syracuse Nationals 2

1956 Eastern Division Semifinals

1957

Boston Celtics 3, Syracuse Nationals 0

1957 Eastern Division Finals

1959

Boston Celtics 4, Syracuse Nationals 3

1959 Eastern Division Finals

1961

Boston Celtics 4, Syracuse Nationals 1

1961 Eastern Division Finals

1965

Boston Celtics 4, Philadelphia 76ers 3

1965 Eastern Division Finals

1966

Boston Celtics 4, Philadelphia 76ers 1

1966 Eastern Division Finals

1967

Boston Celtics 1, Philadelphia 76ers 4

1967 Eastern Division Finals

1968

Boston Celtics 4, Philadelphia 76ers 3

1968 Eastern Division Finals

1969

Boston Celtics 4, Philadelphia 76ers 1

1969 Eastern Division Semifinals

1977

Boston Celtics 3, Philadelphia 76ers 4

1977 Eastern Conference Semifinals

1980

Boston Celtics 1, Philadelphia 76ers 4

1980 Eastern Conference Finals

1981

Boston Celtics 4, Philadelphia 76ers 3

1981 Eastern Conference Finals

1982

Boston Celtics 3, Philadelphia 76ers 4

1982 Eastern Conference Finals

1985

Boston Celtics 4, Philadelphia 76ers 1

1985 Eastern Conference Finals

2002

Boston Celtics 3, Philadelphia 76ers 2

2002 Eastern Conference First Round

=== Western Conference semifinals ===
This is the first playoffs that the city of Los Angeles has both teams participating in the Conference Semifinals. The last time the Lakers and Clippers were in the Conference Semifinals was 1974, when the Clippers franchise was the Buffalo Braves. Also, another team based out of Staples Center, the National Hockey League's Los Angeles Kings, participated in the 2012 Stanley Cup playoffs. As a result of these 3 teams sharing one arena, Games 3 and 4 of the Thunder–Lakers and Spurs–Clippers series were played back-to-back on May 18–19 and 19–20 respectively, to avoid scheduling conflicts.

==== (1) San Antonio Spurs vs. (5) Los Angeles Clippers ====
TNT

May 15
9:30 pm

Recap

Los Angeles Clippers 92, San Antonio Spurs 108
Scoring by quarter: 29–29, 20–28, 23–30, 20–21
Pts: Eric Bledsoe 23; Rebs: Griffin, Jordan 9 each Asts: Chris Paul 10	Pts: Tim Duncan 26; Rebs: Boris Diaw 12; Asts: Tony Parker 11
San Antonio leads series, 1–0

AT&T Center, San Antonio
Attendance: 18,581
Referees: Scott Foster, Derrick Collins, Ron Garretson,

ESPN

May 17
9:30 pm

Recap

Los Angeles Clippers 88, San Antonio Spurs 105
Scoring by quarter: 21–29, 21–17, 25–32, 21–27
Pts: Blake Griffin 20; Rebs: DeAndre Jordan 7 Asts: Chris Paul 5	Pts: Tony Parker 22; Rebs: Parker, Duncan 5 each Asts: Parker, Ginóbili 5 each
San Antonio leads series, 2–0

AT&T Center, San Antonio
Attendance: 18,581
Referees: Ken Mauer, Ed Malloy, Leon Wood,

ABC

May 19
3:30 pm

Recap

San Antonio Spurs 96, Los Angeles Clippers 86
Scoring by quarter: 11–33, 32–20, 26–8, 27–25
Pts: Tony Parker 23; Rebs: Tim Duncan 13; Asts: Tony Parker 10	Pts: Blake Griffin 28; Rebs: Blake Griffin 16; Asts: Chris Paul 11
San Antonio leads series, 3–0

Staples Center, Los Angeles
Attendance: 19,060
Referees: Derrick Stafford, Tony Brothers, Tom Washington,

TNT

May 20
10:30 pm

Recap

San Antonio Spurs 102, Los Angeles Clippers 99
Scoring by quarter: 26–21, 25–26, 23–28, 28–24
Pts: Tim Duncan 21; Rebs: Tim Duncan 9 Asts: Tony Parker 5	Pts: Chris Paul 23; Rebs: DeAndre Jordan 8 Asts: Chris Paul 11
San Antonio wins series, 4–0

Staples Center, Los Angeles
Attendance: 19,060
Referees: Joe Crawford, James Capers, Bill Spooner,

The Spurs won their last 14 games coming into this series. They were also well prepared because they were able to sweep their previous opponent, the Utah Jazz. Meanwhile, the Clippers were coming off a tough seven-game series against the Memphis Grizzlies and had to play Game 1 just 2 days after the Game 7 ended. Game 1 was close as the teams were tied coming into the 2nd quarter. However, the Spurs quickly took control in the 2nd and 3rd quarters as they defeated the Clippers, 108–92, and took a 1–0 series lead. Game 2 then saw a Spurs team taking control in the second half to defeat the Clippers and take a 2–0 lead. Going to Los Angeles for a back-to-back Games 3 and 4, the Clippers looked confident to defeat the Spurs, as they quickly took a 40–16 lead with 9:17 to go in the 2nd. However, the Spurs quickly cut the lead to 7 with 36.4 seconds before the half, with the half ending with a 10-point Clipper lead. Then, with the Clippers holding on to a 12-point lead with 9:39 to go in the 3rd, the Spurs unleashed a ferocious 24–0 run to take a 69–57 lead with 2 minutes to go in the 3rd. The Clippers never got closer than seven down the stretch as they watched the Spurs take a commanding 3–0 lead in the series. Game 4 was a close one, with the Clippers leading for much of the fourth quarter before the Spurs took the lead on a Duncan hook shot. Then, in the final moments of the game, Paul made several mistakes, a bad pass and an off-balanced jump shot that missed, that ultimately led to Clippers' demise. Following Parker's free-throw that extended the Spurs' lead to 3, the Clippers had one last chance. However, out of timeouts, the Clippers were forced to take a long inbound pass. Mo Williams managed to catch the ball but was unable to get a shot off as the Spurs completed the sweep of the Clippers. The Spurs became just the fourth team to go 8–0 through the first two rounds of the playoffs.

Regular-season series

San Antonio won 2–1 in the regular-season series

December 28, 2011

Recap

Los Angeles Clippers 90, San Antonio Spurs 115

AT&T Center, San Antonio

February 18, 2012

Recap

San Antonio Spurs 103, Los Angeles Clippers 100

Staples Center, Los Angeles

March 9, 2012

Recap

Los Angeles Clippers 120, San Antonio Spurs 108

AT&T Center, San Antonio

This was the first playoff meeting between the Clippers and the Spurs.

==== (2) Oklahoma City Thunder vs. (3) Los Angeles Lakers ====
TNT

May 14
9:30 pm

Recap

Los Angeles Lakers 90, Oklahoma City Thunder 119
Scoring by quarter: 23–30, 21–29, 24–39, 22–21
Pts: Bryant, Bynum 20 each Rebs: Andrew Bynum 14; Asts: Steve Blake 4	Pts: Russell Westbrook 27; Rebs: Kevin Durant 8 Asts: Russell Westbrook 9
Oklahoma City leads series, 1–0

Chesapeake Energy Arena, Oklahoma City, Oklahoma
Attendance: 18,203
Referees: Greg Willard, Tony Brothers, David Guthrie,

TNT

May 16
9:30 pm

Recap

Los Angeles Lakers 75, Oklahoma City Thunder 77
Scoring by quarter: 22–21, 23–27, 18–12, 12–17
Pts: Bryant, Bynum 20 each Rebs: Pau Gasol 11; Asts: Kobe Bryant 4	Pts: Kevin Durant 22; Rebs: Kevin Durant 7 Asts: Kevin Durant 5
Oklahoma City leads series, 2–0

Chesapeake Energy Arena, Oklahoma City, Oklahoma
Attendance: 18,203
Referees: Monty McCutchen, Rodney Mott, Jason Phillips,

ESPN

May 18
10:30 pm

Recap

Oklahoma City Thunder 96, Los Angeles Lakers 99
Scoring by quarter: 15–23, 32–27, 23–19, 26–30
Pts: Kevin Durant 31; Rebs: Serge Ibaka 11; Asts: Thabo Sefolosha 4	Pts: Kobe Bryant 36; Rebs: Bynum, Gasol 11 each Asts: Bryant, Gasol 6 each
Oklahoma City leads series, 2–1

Staples Center, Los Angeles
Attendance: 18,997
Referees: Joe Crawford, Marc Davis, Zach Zarba,

TNT

May 19
10:30 pm

Recap

Oklahoma City Thunder 103, Los Angeles Lakers 100
Scoring by quarter: 24–29, 22–27, 25–24, 32–20
Pts: Russell Westbrook 37; Rebs: Kevin Durant 13; Asts: Russell Westbrook 5	Pts: Kobe Bryant 38; Rebs: Andrew Bynum 9 Asts: Bryant, Sessions 5 each
Oklahoma City leads series, 3–1

Staples Center, Los Angeles
Attendance: 18,997
Referees: Dan Crawford, Ron Garretson, Ken Mauer,

TNT

May 21
9:30 pm

Recap

Los Angeles Lakers 90, Oklahoma City Thunder 106
Scoring by quarter: 21–26, 30–28, 26–29, 13–23
Pts: Kobe Bryant 42; Rebs: Pau Gasol 16; Asts: Metta World Peace 5	Pts: Russell Westbrook 28; Rebs: Kendrick Perkins 11; Asts: Durant, Harden, Westbrook 4 each
Oklahoma City wins series, 4–1

Chesapeake Energy Arena, Oklahoma City, Oklahoma
Attendance: 18,203
Referees: Scott Foster, John Goble, Tom Washington,

Much like the Spurs-Clippers series, the series featured a team that swept their first round opponents and another team that were coming off a tough seven-game series. As such, the Thunder had the advantage in Game 1. The result was a convincing 29-point blowout by the Thunder to the Lakers. The Thunder quickly took control through the first three quarters and stretched their lead to as high as 35. Game 2 was much closer, with the Lakers shocking the Thunder by leading by 7 with 2 minutes to go that would seemingly tie the series at 1. However, the Lakers would fail to keep the lead, with the Thunder eventually going on a 9–0 run to take a 2–0 series lead. In Game 3, the Lakers collaborated on both ends to prevent the Thunder from taking a 3–0 lead putting them back into the series. Game 4 saw the Lakers start strong, taking a 10-point lead at halftime. They were able to have a 13-point lead in the fourth. However, Thunder outscored the Lakers 25–9 the rest of the way to take a 3–1 series lead, putting the Lakers into the brink of elimination. With the score tied at 98, Russell Westbrook committed a crucial turnover when he slipped and lost the ball. However, Pau Gasol's pass was taken by Durant, setting up Durant's 3-pointer that gave the Thunder the lead for good. The Lakers still had one last chance to tie but Kobe Bryant's three missed, with Harden hitting two free-throws to effectively seal the deal. In Game 5, Lakers were able to keep the game close throughout the first three quarters before the Thunder closed the series on a flurry, starting with two threes by Durant with Westbrook converting an and-one layup to shift the momentum in favor of Oklahoma City. The Lakers were not able to respond as they watched the Thunder take the series, 4–1, to send the Lakers back home for the second straight season in the Conference Semifinals.

Regular-season series

Oklahoma City won 2–1 in the regular-season series

February 23, 2012

Recap

Los Angeles Lakers 85, Oklahoma City Thunder 100

Chesapeake Energy Arena, Oklahoma City, Oklahoma

March 29, 2012

Recap

Oklahoma City Thunder 102, Los Angeles Lakers 93

Staples Center, Los Angeles

April 22, 2012

Recap

Oklahoma City Thunder 106, Los Angeles Lakers 114

Staples Center, Los Angeles

This was the ninth playoff meeting between these two teams, with the Lakers winning six of the first eight meetings.

Previous playoff series
Los Angeles leads 6–2 in all-time playoff series

1978

Los Angeles Lakers 1, Seattle SuperSonics 2

1978 Western Conference First Round

1979

Los Angeles Lakers 1, Seattle SuperSonics 4

1979 Western Conference Semifinals

1980

Los Angeles Lakers 4, Seattle SuperSonics 1

1980 Western Conference Finals

1987

Los Angeles Lakers 4, Seattle SuperSonics 0

1987 Western Conference Finals

1989

Los Angeles Lakers 4, Seattle SuperSonics 0

1989 Western Conference Semifinals

1995

Los Angeles Lakers 3, Seattle SuperSonics 1

1995 Western Conference First Round

1998

Los Angeles Lakers 4, Seattle SuperSonics 1

1998 Western Conference Semifinals

2010

Los Angeles Lakers 4, Oklahoma City Thunder 2

2010 Western Conference First Round

- This is the most recent playoff series between the Thunder & Lakers until 2026.

== Conference finals ==
=== Eastern Conference finals ===
==== (2) Miami Heat vs. (4) Boston Celtics ====
ESPN

May 28
8:30 pm

Recap

Boston Celtics 79, Miami Heat 93
Scoring by quarter: 11–21, 35–25, 15–26, 18–21
Pts: Kevin Garnett 23; Rebs: Kevin Garnett 10; Asts: Rajon Rondo 7	Pts: LeBron James 32; Rebs: LeBron James 13; Asts: Dwyane Wade 7
Miami leads series, 1–0

American Airlines Arena, Miami
Attendance: 19,912
Referees: Dan Crawford, Ed Malloy, Jason Phillips,

ESPN

May 30
8:30 pm

Recap

Boston Celtics 111, Miami Heat 115 (OT)
Scoring by quarter: 24–18, 29–28, 22–35, 24–18, Overtime: 12–16
Pts: Rajon Rondo 44; Rebs: Brandon Bass 10; Asts: Rajon Rondo 10	Pts: LeBron James 34; Rebs: Udonis Haslem 11; Asts: LeBron James 7
Miami leads series, 2–0

American Airlines Arena, Miami
Attendance: 19,973
Referees: Ken Mauer, James Capers, Tom Washington,

ESPN

June 1
8:30 pm

Recap

Miami Heat 91, Boston Celtics 101
Scoring by quarter: 28–30, 14–25, 21–30, 28–16
Pts: LeBron James 34; Rebs: LeBron James 8 Asts: Mario Chalmers 6	Pts: Kevin Garnett 24; Rebs: Kevin Garnett 11; Asts: Rajon Rondo 10
Miami leads series, 2–1

TD Garden, Boston
Attendance: 18,624
Referees: Scott Foster, Mike Callahan, Rodney Mott

ESPN

June 3
8:30 pm

Recap

Miami Heat 91, Boston Celtics 93 (OT)
Scoring by quarter: 23–34, 24–27, 21–12, 21–16, Overtime: 2–4
Pts: LeBron James 29; Rebs: Udonis Haslem 17; Asts: Dwyane Wade 6	Pts: Paul Pierce 23; Rebs: Kevin Garnett 14; Asts: Rajon Rondo 15
Series tied, 2–2

TD Garden, Boston
Attendance: 18,624
Referees: Joe Crawford, Bill Kennedy, Greg Willard,

ESPN

June 5
8:30 pm

Recap

Boston Celtics 94, Miami Heat 90
Scoring by quarter: 16–24, 24–18, 25–18, 29–30
Pts: Kevin Garnett 26; Rebs: Kevin Garnett 11; Asts: Rajon Rondo 13	Pts: LeBron James 30; Rebs: Udonis Haslem 14; Asts: Chalmers, Wade 3 each
Boston leads series, 3–2

American Airlines Arena, Miami
Attendance: 20,021
Referees: Monty McCutchen, Ron Garretson, Derrick Stafford,

ESPN

June 7
8:30 pm

Recap

Miami Heat 98, Boston Celtics 79
Scoring by quarter: 26–16, 29–26, 19–19, 24–18
Pts: LeBron James 45; Rebs: LeBron James 15; Asts: LeBron James 5	Pts: Rajon Rondo 21; Rebs: Brandon Bass 7 Asts: Rajon Rondo 10
Series tied, 3–3

TD Garden, Boston
Attendance: 18,624
Referees: Dan Crawford, Tony Brothers, Tom Washington

ESPN

June 9
8:30 pm

Recap

Boston Celtics 88, Miami Heat 101
Scoring by quarter: 27–23, 26–23, 20–27, 15–28
Pts: Rajon Rondo 22; Rebs: Rajon Rondo 10; Asts: Rajon Rondo 14	Pts: LeBron James 31; Rebs: LeBron James 12; Asts: Mario Chalmers 7
Miami wins series 4–3

American Airlines Arena, Miami
Attendance: 20,114
Referees: Joe Crawford, Mike Callahan, Scott Foster

This series marked the third straight year that the Heat and Celtics faced each other in the playoffs. They faced each other in the Eastern Conference First Round in 2010 (won by the Celtics, 4–1) and in the Eastern Conference Semifinals in 2011 (won by the Heat, 4–1). In addition, LeBron faced the Celtics for the third straight year in the playoffs. The LeBron-led Cavs also faced the Celtics in 2010 only to be defeated 4–2, which led to James' arrival on the Heat.

In Game 1, the Celtics started poorly, scoring only 11 points in the first quarter. The Heat had a 10-point lead after 1. The Celtics were hot in the second, scoring 35 points en route to tying the game at halftime. Behind a big second half, the Heat eventually defeated the Celtics 93–79 to take a 1–0 series lead. Game 2 was very different, with the Celtics starting very strong. Midway through the second quarter, a Rondo jumper extended their lead to 15. However, the Heat cut it to 7 at halftime. Miami had another big 3rd quarter. With the Celtics up 71–66 with 4:24 left in the third, a block by Wade on Allen ignited a 15–4 run by the Heat to end the quarter, as they took a 6-point lead heading into the fourth. The fourth quarter was close. With Miami leading 99–96 with 34 seconds left, Allen made a 3 to tie it. It eventually sent the game to OT, with James missing two chances to win the game. Miami eventually won 115–111 to take a 2–0 series lead. Rondo led the Celtics with a career-high 44 points, along with 8 rebounds and 10 assists. There was controversy in regards to the officiating as the Heat shot 18 more free throws, the Celtics committed 33 fouls to the Heat's 18, as well as a play in overtime in a tie game where Rondo was hit in the head by Wade and no foul was called, leading to a fast break dunk for Udonis Haslem. In Game 3, the Celtics got strong performances from Rondo, Garnett, and Pierce. LeBron was also hot in the first quarter, scoring 16 points and making 7 of his first 9 shots. However, despite this performance, the second and third quarters were decisive, with the Celtics outscoring the Heat a combined 55–35 in the two quarters as they had an 85–63 lead heading into the fourth. Miami made a comeback, hitting 3's and dunks to cut the lead to 8. However, Boston held on for a 101–91 victory to make it 2–1. Game 4 was the same story, with the Celtics hitting several 3's and putting on a lead as big as 18. Miami tried another comeback in the third and fourth quarters. Unlike Game 3, they took the lead. Boston answered back, holding a 3-point lead in the final minute before James hit a 3 to tie it with 36 seconds left. This led to the second overtime game of the series. It was a low-scoring affair in OT, with both teams only making one field goal. With 4:22 left, Pierce fouled out, giving Miami a big chance. However, James fouled out with 1:51 left. The Celtics still held a 2-point lead in the dying seconds, but Wade missed a potential game-winning 3 at the buzzer, giving the Celtics a 93–91 win to tie the series going back to Miami. Celtics proceeded to lead the series, 3–2, with a 94–90 win in Game 5. In the game, Bosh returned for the first time since he got injured in Game 1 of the Heat-Pacers series but was not much of a help on the offensive end. He came off the bench in the game and scored 9 points and grabbed 7 rebounds in 14 minutes played. With the Celtics leading by 1 with less than a minute to go, Pierce knocked down a crucial three-pointer that gave the Celtics the lead for good. The Heat prevented a celebration from happening in Game 6 with a 98–79 blowout win at Boston to send the series back to Miami for a seventh and deciding game. James had one of his best playoff games, scoring 45 points and getting 15 rebounds, 30 of his 45 came in the first half alone. In Game 7, the Celtics started strong. In the second quarter, Garnett picked up his third foul, giving the Heat a chance to try and take a lead. However, Bass led a run that pushed the Celtics' lead to 11. The Celtics would still have a 7-point lead at halftime. The third quarter was decisive once again, letting the Heat tie the game going to the fourth quarter, which was even more decisive. With the Celtics leading by 1 with 8 minutes left, James had a dunk that gave the Heat the lead. It was soon followed by Bosh's third three-pointer of the night (a career-high three 3 pointers) that gave the Heat the lead for good. The Celtics never recovered as the Heat booked a return trip to the Finals with a 101–88 Game 7 win in Miami.

- Boston wouldn't return to the Conference Finals again until 2017.
- This is the last playoff match-up between Boston & Miami until 2020.

Regular-season series

Boston won 3–1 in the regular-season series

December 27, 2011

Recap

Boston Celtics 107, Miami Heat 115

American Airlines Arena, Miami

April 1, 2012

Recap

Miami Heat 72, Boston Celtics 91

TD Garden, Boston

April 10, 2012

Recap

Boston Celtics 115, Miami Heat 107

American Airlines Arena, Miami

April 24, 2012

Recap

Miami Heat 66, Boston Celtics 78

TD Garden, Boston

This was the third playoff meeting between these two teams, with each team winning one series apiece.

Previous playoff series
Tied 1–1 in all-time playoff series

2010

Boston Celtics 4, Miami Heat 1

2010 Eastern Conference First Round

2011

Boston Celtics 1, Miami Heat 4

2011 Eastern Conference Semifinals

=== Western Conference finals ===
==== (1) San Antonio Spurs vs. (2) Oklahoma City Thunder ====
TNT

May 27
8:30 pm

Recap

Oklahoma City Thunder 98, San Antonio Spurs 101
Scoring by quarter: 18–24, 29–22, 24–16, 27–39
Pts: Kevin Durant 27; Rebs: Kevin Durant 10; Asts: Russell Westbrook 5	Pts: Manu Ginóbili 26; Rebs: Tim Duncan 11; Asts: Tony Parker 6
San Antonio leads series, 1–0

AT&T Center, San Antonio
Attendance: 18,581
Referees: Joe Crawford, Marc Davis, Greg Willard,

TNT

May 29
9:00 pm

Recap

Oklahoma City Thunder 111, San Antonio Spurs 120
Scoring by quarter: 22–28, 22–27, 32–37, 35–28
Pts: Kevin Durant 31; Rebs: Serge Ibaka 10; Asts: Russell Westbrook 8	Pts: Tony Parker 34; Rebs: Tim Duncan 12; Asts: Tony Parker 8
San Antonio leads series, 2–0

AT&T Center, San Antonio
Attendance: 18,581
Referees: Monty McCutchen, Tony Brothers, Ron Garretson,

TNT

May 31
9:00 pm

Recap

San Antonio Spurs 82, Oklahoma City Thunder 102
Scoring by quarter: 24–22, 17–32, 19–24, 22–24
Pts: Parker, Jackson 16 each Rebs: Ginóbili, Leonard, Blair 6 each Asts: Gary Neal 5	Pts: Kevin Durant 22; Rebs: Kendrick Perkins 8 Asts: Russell Westbrook 9
San Antonio leads series, 2–1

Chesapeake Energy Arena, Oklahoma City, Oklahoma
Attendance: 18,203
Referees: Dan Crawford, Derrick Stafford, Bill Spooner

TNT

June 2
8:30 pm

Recap

San Antonio Spurs 103, Oklahoma City Thunder 109
Scoring by quarter: 26–26, 17–29, 28–20, 32–34
Pts: Tim Duncan 21; Rebs: Kawhi Leonard 9 Asts: Parker, Ginóbili 4 each	Pts: Kevin Durant 36; Rebs: Kendrick Perkins 9 Asts: Kevin Durant 8
Series tied, 2–2

Chesapeake Energy Arena, Oklahoma City, Oklahoma
Attendance: 18,203
Referees: Ken Mauer, James Capers, Ed Malloy,

TNT

June 4
9:00 pm

Recap

Oklahoma City Thunder 108, San Antonio Spurs 103
Scoring by quarter: 26–21, 26–23, 29–28, 27–31
Pts: Kevin Durant 27; Rebs: Kendrick Perkins 10; Asts: Russell Westbrook 12	Pts: Manu Ginóbili 34; Rebs: Tim Duncan 12; Asts: Manu Ginóbili 7
Oklahoma City leads series, 3–2

AT&T Center, San Antonio
Attendance: 18,581
Referees: Scott Foster, Mike Callahan, Tom Washington,

TNT

June 6
9:00 pm

Recap

San Antonio Spurs 99, Oklahoma City Thunder 107
Scoring by quarter: 34–20, 29–28, 18–32, 18–27
Pts: Tony Parker 29; Rebs: Tim Duncan 14; Asts: Tony Parker 12	Pts: Kevin Durant 34; Rebs: Kevin Durant 14; Asts: Durant, Westbrook 5 each
Oklahoma City wins series, 4–2

Chesapeake Energy Arena, Oklahoma City, Oklahoma
Attendance: 18,203
Referees: Joe Crawford, Bill Kennedy, Rodney Mott,

This series would mark only the second time in the last seven years that the top two seeds from the Western Conference faced each other in the Conference Finals. Game 1 would be close, with the Thunder taking a 9-point lead going to the fourth, looking poised to give the Spurs their first loss of the postseason. However, the Spurs took control on both ends in the fourth quarter to stay perfect in the playoffs. In Game 2, the Spurs started strong, at one point in the third quarter taking a 22-point lead. The Thunder would try to climb back in the fourth quarter, eventually cutting the lead to 6 in the fourth quarter. However, the Spurs would answer every run, en route to a 120–111 win over the Thunder and a 2–0 series lead. Manu Ginobili sealed the deal by hitting a three-pointer that extended the Spurs' lead to 10 with about a minute and a half to go. With the win, the Spurs extended their 2012 playoff record to 10–0. This win also marked the Spurs' 20th consecutive win, tied for the 3rd longest winning streak in NBA history. It is also the longest winning streak that was carried from the regular season and into the playoffs. In Game 3, the Spurs were no match for the Thunder. Behind their thunder blue home crowd, the Thunder blew out the Spurs, 102–82, to give them their first 2012 postseason loss. Game 4 was much closer. In the fourth quarter, Kevin Durant scored half of his 36 points as the Thunder tied the series with a 109–103 win over the Spurs. In Game 5, the Thunder started strong, at one point in the second quarter taking a 13-point lead. The Spurs would still come back in the second half. Fueled by two threes from Ginobili, the Spurs took the lead back. However, the Thunder eventually outscored the Spurs 25–12 for the rest of the quarter to take a 9-point lead heading to the fourth quarter. After a Harden 4-point play that gave the Thunder another 13-point lead, things began to unravel as the Spurs staged an 11–0 run through the next 4 minutes to bring them back into the game. Then, with the Thunder holding on for a 103–101 lead with 28 seconds left, Harden came up big by hitting a crucial three-pointer to give the Thunder a 5-point lead. The Spurs would not give up. Following a Ginobili layup shot that cut the lead to 3, a fullcourt press by the Spurs forced a Thunder turnover, giving them a chance to tie the game. However, Ginobili missed a three-pointer that sealed a 3–2 lead for the Thunder. In Game 6, the Spurs dominated early, outscoring the Thunder by 14 in the first quarter and holding a 15-point lead at halftime. Their largest lead of the game was 18. However the Thunder rallied in the 3rd quarter, outscoring the Spurs 32–18. With a few clutch shots by Derek Fisher and James Harden, the Thunder booked a trip to the Finals with a 107–99 comeback win over the Spurs. With the win, the Thunder advanced to the NBA Finals for the first time since moving from Seattle in 2008 and the franchise's first appearance in the NBA Finals since 1996, when the franchise was known as the Seattle SuperSonics.

Regular-season series

San Antonio won 2–1 in the regular-season series

January 8, 2012

Recap

San Antonio Spurs 96, Oklahoma City Thunder 108

Chesapeake Energy Arena, Oklahoma City, Oklahoma

February 4, 2012

Recap

Oklahoma City Thunder 96, San Antonio Spurs 107

AT&T Center, San Antonio

March 16, 2012

Recap

San Antonio Spurs 114, Oklahoma City Thunder 105

Chesapeake Energy Arena, Oklahoma City, Oklahoma

This was the fourth playoff meeting between these two teams, with the Spurs winning the first three meetings. All previous meetings took place while the Thunder franchise were still known as the Seattle SuperSonics.

Previous playoff series
San Antonio leads 3–0 in all-time playoff series

1982

San Antonio Spurs 4, Seattle SuperSonics 1

1982 Western Conference Semifinals

2002

San Antonio Spurs 3, Seattle SuperSonics 2

2002 Western Conference First Round

2005

San Antonio Spurs 4, Seattle SuperSonics 2

2005 Western Conference Semifinals

== NBA Finals: (W2) Oklahoma City Thunder vs. (E2) Miami Heat ==
ABC

June 12
9:00 pm

Recap

Miami Heat 94, Oklahoma City Thunder 105
Scoring by quarter: 29–22, 25–25, 19–27, 21–31
Pts: LeBron James 30; Rebs: Udonis Haslem 11; Asts: Dwyane Wade 8	Pts: Kevin Durant 36; Rebs: Nick Collison 10; Asts: Russell Westbrook 11
Oklahoma City leads series, 1–0

Chesapeake Energy Arena, Oklahoma City, Oklahoma
Attendance: 18,203
Referees: Monty McCutchen, Derrick Stafford, Ed Malloy

ABC

June 14
9:00 pm

Recap

Miami Heat 100, Oklahoma City Thunder 96
Scoring by quarter: 27–15, 28–28, 23–24, 22–29
Pts: LeBron James 32; Rebs: Chris Bosh 15; Asts: Wade, James 5 each	Pts: Kevin Durant 32; Rebs: Perkins, Westbrook 8 each Asts: Russell Westbrook 7
Series tied, 1–1

Chesapeake Energy Arena, Oklahoma City, Oklahoma
Attendance: 18,203
Referees: Dan Crawford, Tony Brothers, Tom Washington

ABC

June 17
8:00 pm

Recap

Oklahoma City Thunder 85, Miami Heat 91
Scoring by quarter: 20–26, 26–21, 21–22, 18–22
Pts: Kevin Durant 25; Rebs: Kendrick Perkins 12; Asts: James Harden 6	Pts: LeBron James 29; Rebs: LeBron James 14; Asts: Dwyane Wade 7
Miami leads series, 2–1

American Airlines Arena, Miami
Attendance: 20,003
Referees: Joe Crawford, James Capers, Ken Mauer

ABC

June 19
9:00 pm

Recap

Oklahoma City Thunder 98, Miami Heat 104
Scoring by quarter: 33–19, 16–27, 26–33, 23–25
Pts: Russell Westbrook 43; Rebs: James Harden 10; Asts: Russell Westbrook 5	Pts: LeBron James 26; Rebs: James, Bosh 9 each Asts: LeBron James 12
Miami leads series, 3–1

American Airlines Arena, Miami
Attendance: 20,003
Referees: Scott Foster, Mike Callahan, Bill Kennedy

ABC

June 21
9:00 pm

Recap

Oklahoma City Thunder 106, Miami Heat 121
Scoring by quarter: 26–31, 23–28, 22–36, 35–26
Pts: Kevin Durant 32; Rebs: Kevin Durant 11; Asts: Russell Westbrook 6	Pts: LeBron James 26; Rebs: LeBron James 11; Asts: LeBron James 13
Miami wins series, 4–1

American Airlines Arena, Miami
Attendance: 20,003
Referees: Dan Crawford, Monty McCutchen, Derrick Stafford

Regular-season series

Tied 1–1 in the regular-season series

March 25, 2012

Recap

Miami Heat 87, Oklahoma City Thunder 103

Chesapeake Energy Arena, Oklahoma City, Oklahoma

April 4, 2012

Recap

Oklahoma City Thunder 93, Miami Heat 98

American Airlines Arena, Miami

This was the first playoff meeting between the Heat and the Thunder.

== Statistic leaders ==
Category	High			Average			
Category	Player	Team	Total	Player	Team	Avg.	Games played
Points	LeBron James	Miami Heat	45	LeBron James	Miami Heat	30.3	23
Rebounds	Paul Millsap	Utah Jazz	19	Josh Smith	Atlanta Hawks	13.6	5
Assists	Rajon Rondo	Boston Celtics	17	Rajon Rondo	Boston Celtics	11.9	19
Steals	Jason Kidd	Dallas Mavericks	7	Jason Kidd	Dallas Mavericks	3.0	4
Blocks	Andrew Bynum	Los Angeles Lakers	10*	JaVale McGee	Denver Nuggets	3.1	7

* Tied NBA Playoffs Record
