= Serge Ibaka's How Hungry Are You? =

Canadian television show

Serge Ibaka's How Hungry Are You? is a Canadian television show hosted by basketball player Serge Ibaka. Based in part around his personal passion for cooking, the show centres on Ibaka interviewing celebrity guests over a meal he cooked using unusual ingredients, such as worms or animal brains, that may challenge the guest's appetite.

Most guests on the series have been sports figures, although he has also featured some guests from the entertainment world.

The series was originally launched on Ibaka's personal YouTube channel in 2018, before being picked up for rebroadcast by Sportsnet in 2022.

The 2022 episode featuring basketball player Giannis Antetokounmpo won the Canadian Screen Award for Best Sports Program or Series at the 12th Canadian Screen Awards in 2024.
