= Serge Ibaka =

Congolese basketball player (born 1989)

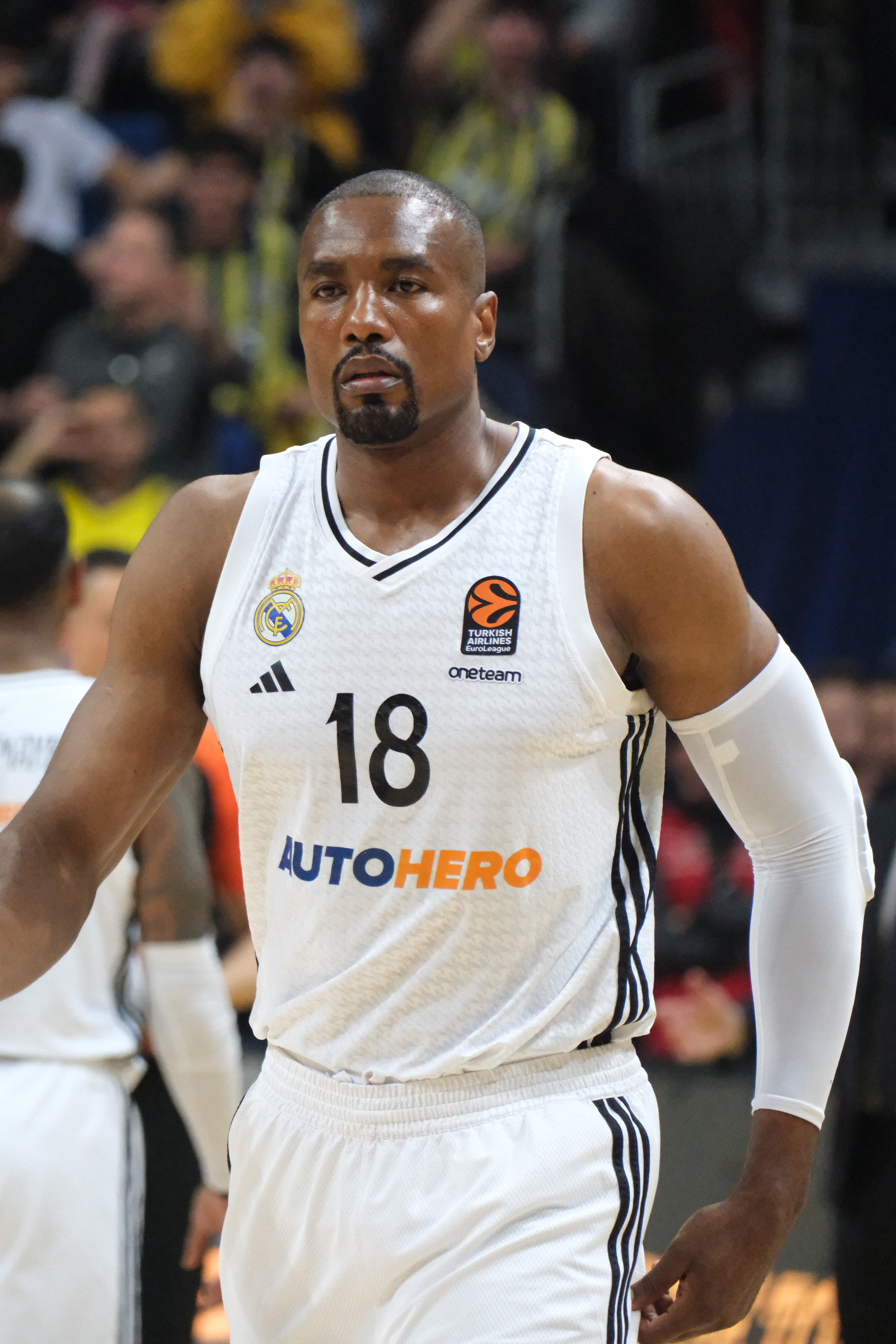
- Ibaka with Real Madrid in 2025

Free agent
- Position: Center / power forward

Personal information
- Born: 18 September 1989 (age 37) Brazzaville, People's Republic of the Congo
- Listed height: 2.08 m (6 ft 10 in)
- Listed weight: 107 kg (236 lb)

Career information
- NBA draft: 2008: 1st round, 24th overall pick
- Drafted by: Seattle SuperSonics
- Playing career: 2006–present

Career history
- 2006: Inter Club
- 2007–2008: L'Hospitalet
- 2008–2009: Manresa
- 2009–2016: Oklahoma City Thunder
- 2011: Real Madrid
- 2016–2017: Orlando Magic
- 2017–2020: Toronto Raptors
- 2020–2022: Los Angeles Clippers
- 2021: →Agua Caliente Clippers
- 2022–2023: Milwaukee Bucks
- 2023–2024: Bayern Munich
- 2024–2025: Real Madrid

Career highlights
- NBA champion (2019); 3× NBA All-Defensive First Team (2012–2014); 2× NBA blocks leader (2012, 2013); Bundesliga champion (2024); All-Bundesliga Second Team (2024); German Cup winner (2024); Liga ACB champion (2025)
- Stats at NBA.com
- Stats at Basketball Reference
Medals
Men's basketball
Representing Spain
Olympic Games
Silver medal – second place	2012 London	Team
FIBA European Championship
Gold medal – first place	2011 Lithuania	Team

Serge Jonás Ibaka Ngobila (/ˈsɜːrdʒ iːˈbækə/; born 18 September 1989) is a Congolese-Spanish professional basketball player who last played for Real Madrid of the Spanish Liga ACB and the EuroLeague. He was drafted by the Seattle SuperSonics, but became the Oklahoma City Thunder before the season, with the 24th overall pick in the 2008 NBA draft. Ibaka is a three-time NBA All-Defensive First Team selection and has twice led the league in blocks. Although born in the Republic of the Congo, he is also a Spanish citizen and has played for the Spain national team. In 2019, Ibaka won an NBA championship as a member of the Toronto Raptors.

== Early life ==
Ibaka was born in Brazzaville, People's Republic of the Congo (modern-day Republic of the Congo) on 18 September 1989 and is the third youngest of 18 children. His father played basketball in the Republic of the Congo and with the Congolese national team, and his mother played for the Democratic Republic of the Congo. Ibaka started playing basketball at a very young age with his first club, Avenir du Rail, using the sport as an escape from his mother's untimely death and his father's imprisonment during the Second Congo War. Ibaka's father organized for the family to flee the country prior to the war, but ended up as a political prisoner upon their return.

== Professional career ==
=== Inter Club (2006) ===
After playing for the Avenir du Rail senior team, Ibaka later joined rival club Inter Club junior team. Ibaka preferred the club because of its better structure, as it provided sneakers and meals. With Inter's senior team, Ibaka played in the 2006 FIBA Africa Clubs Champions Cup, the highest competition in Africa. There, he led the competition in rebounds and was named to the competition's All-Star Five.

=== L'Hospitalet (2007–2008) ===
In March 2007, Ibaka moved to France at age 17 and joined a second-division basketball team before moving to Spain, where he taught himself Spanish. In Spain, Ibaka soon began playing with a second-division basketball club CB L'Hospitalet. He averaged 10.8 points and 8.2 rebounds and shot 55%.

In 2008, Ibaka attended several international showcases, winning an MVP award at the Reebok Eurocamp and drawing the attention of NBA scouts. An NBA scout at one of the camps said that "athletically he's off the charts—there's no telling how good he can be".

=== Manresa (2008–2009) ===
Ibaka was selected by the Seattle SuperSonics with the 24th pick in the 2008 NBA draft. He became the first player from the Republic of Congo to be selected in the draft. However, the Oklahoma City Thunder (the re-branded SuperSonics that relocated to Oklahoma City immediately after the draft) agreed to keep Ibaka in Europe. He then signed a three-year contract with Ricoh Manresa from the ACB League in Spain, keeping the option to leave for the NBA after each season. In the ACB, Ibaka averaged 7.1 points, 4.5 rebounds, and 1.0 blocks in 16 minutes per game.

=== Oklahoma City Thunder (2009–2011) ===
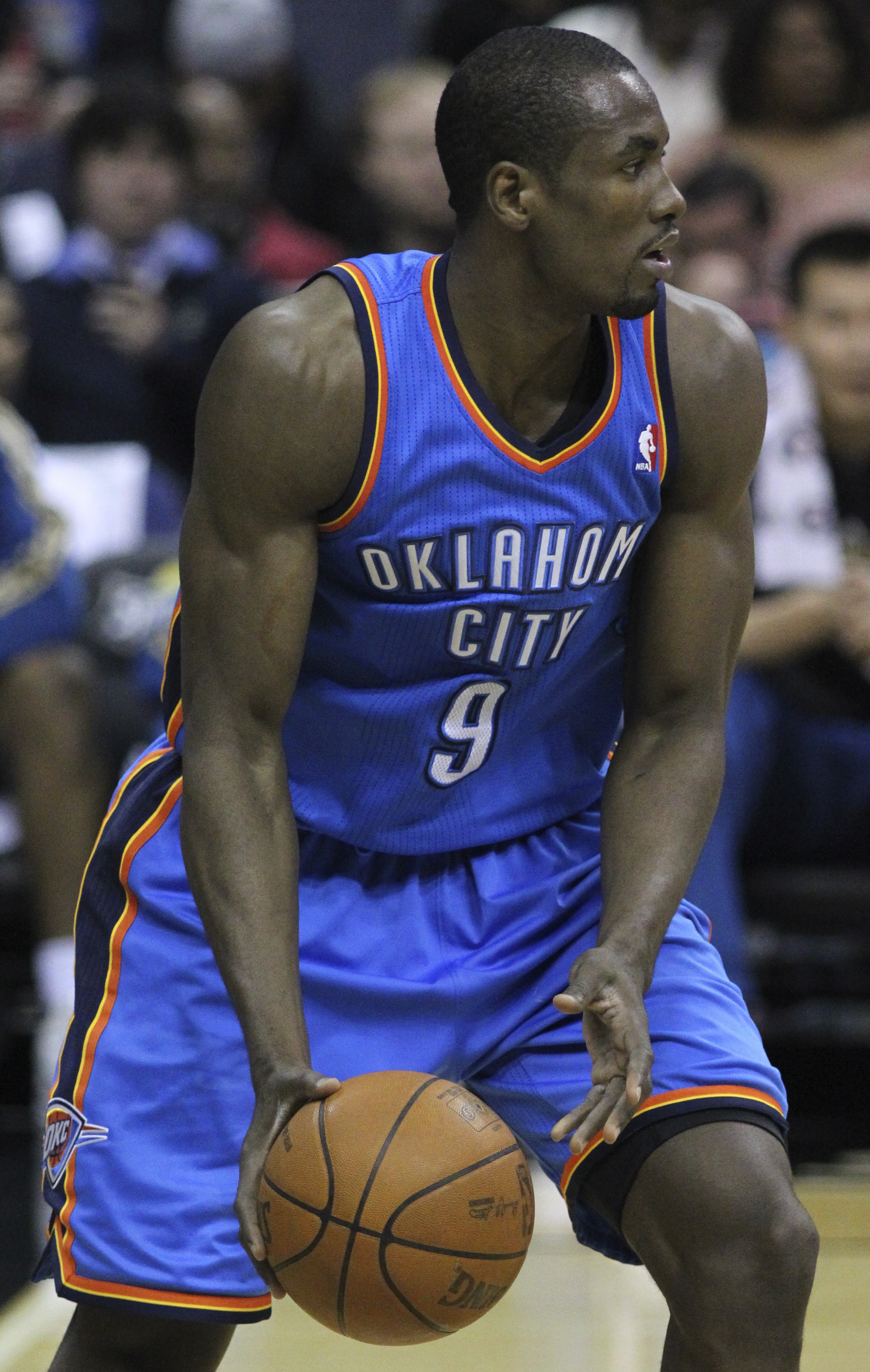
Ibaka in 2011

In July 2009, the Thunder paid the buyout for Ibaka's deal with Manresa and signed him to a two-year contract with two more optional seasons.

Although coming to the NBA as a raw talent, Ibaka had managed to become a starter in the Thunder rotation. He was often used for his energy in the paint, whether on defense or rebounding. In his first NBA season, Ibaka played 18.1 minutes per game in 73 games, averaging 6.3 points, 5.4 rebounds, and 1.3 blocks per game. His blocks average led all rookies in the 2009–10 season, and he ranked number 20 overall. In the first round of the playoffs against the Los Angeles Lakers, Ibaka played in six games, averaging 25.5 minutes, 7.8 points, 6.5 rebounds and 2.0 blocks per game. His seven blocks during Game 2 were a record, and Ibaka became the youngest player to have seven blocks in a playoff game.

On 19 February 2011, Ibaka participated in the 2011 NBA Slam Dunk Contest. He began the contest with a free-throw line dunk. In the second round, Ibaka grabbed a stuffed animal from the rim with his mouth and dunked in one motion. However, Ibaka lost out to Blake Griffin in the competition.

=== Real Madrid (2011) ===
During the 2011 NBA lockout, Ibaka signed a two-month contract with Real Madrid in Spain alongside Spain national basketball team teammate and friend Rudy Fernández with an option to return to the NBA at the end of the lockout. Over six games in the EuroLeague, he averaged 5.5 points, 4.7 rebounds and 2.0 blocks in 15 minutes per game.

=== Return to Oklahoma City (2011–2016) ===
After the lockout, Ibaka returned to the NBA from Spain. On 19 February 2012, he recorded his first career triple-double against the Denver Nuggets, scoring 14 points, grabbing 15 rebounds, and getting a career-high 11 blocks. Ibaka played all 66 games in the shortened season as a starter, averaging the most blocks in the league, 3.6 per game. In voting for the Defensive Player of the Year, he finished second behind Tyson Chandler of the New York Knicks. In Game 4 of the Western Conference Finals against the San Antonio Spurs, Ibaka went 11–11 from the field. Oklahoma City went on to win the series in six games and advance to the 2012 NBA Finals. In the Finals, Ibaka averaged 7.0 points and 5.0 rebounds, but the Thunder fell to the Miami Heat in five games.

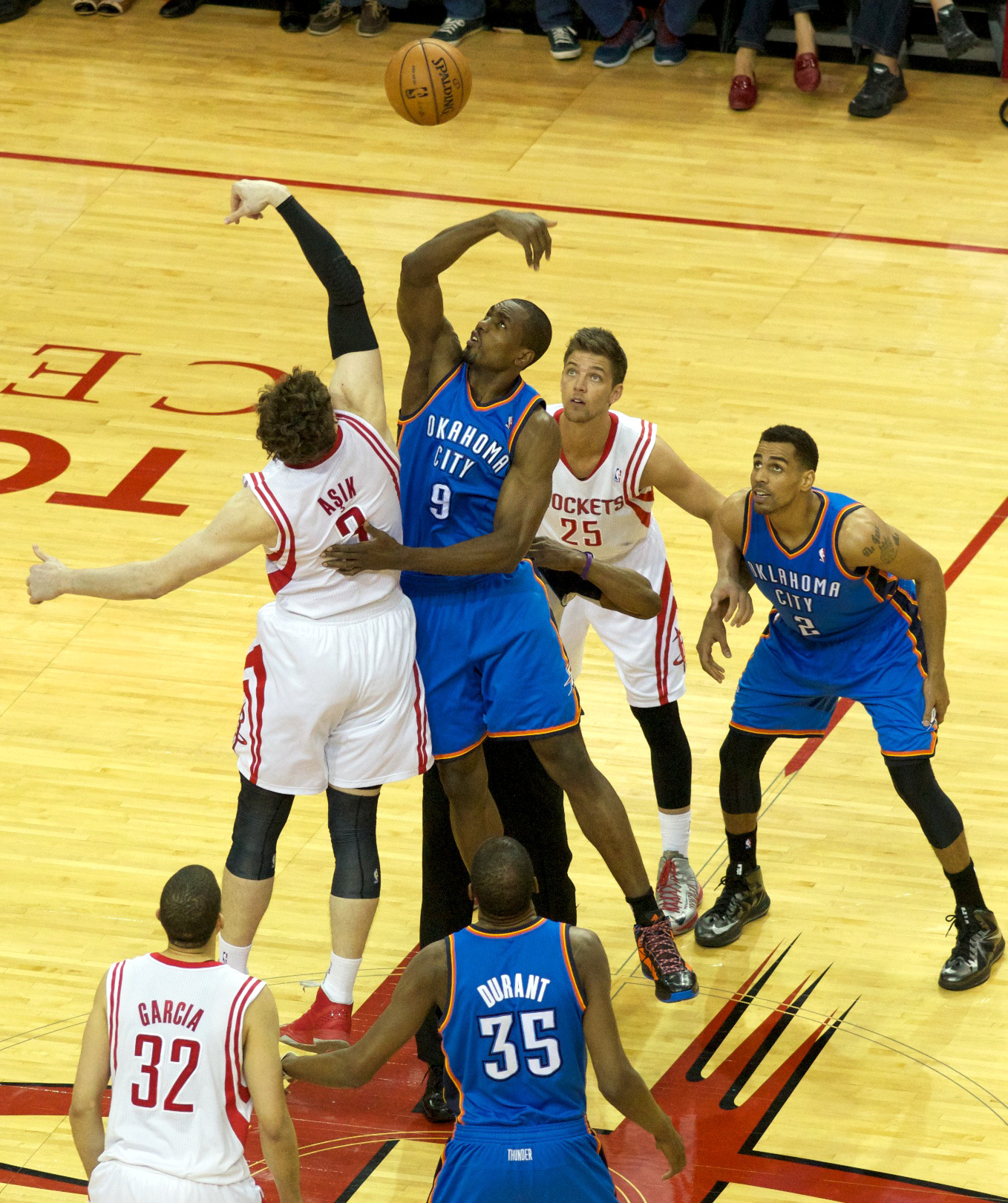
Ibaka and Ömer Aşık tip off Game 6 of the first round of the 2013 playoffs

In August 2012, Ibaka signed a four-year deal worth $48 million with the Thunder. During the 2012–13 NBA season, Ibaka upped his scoring average from 9.1 to 13.2. Ibaka also averaged 7.7 rebounds, and a league-leading 3.0 blocks. For his defensive efforts, Ibaka finished third in Defensive Player of the Year voting, behind LeBron James and the winner, Marc Gasol. In the playoffs, the Thunder beat the Houston Rockets in six games but fell to the Memphis Grizzlies in five games. Ibaka averaged 12.8 points, 8.4 rebounds, and 3.0 blocks in the postseason but shot only 43.7% from the field, a near 14% drop off from his regular season field goal percentage of 57.3%.

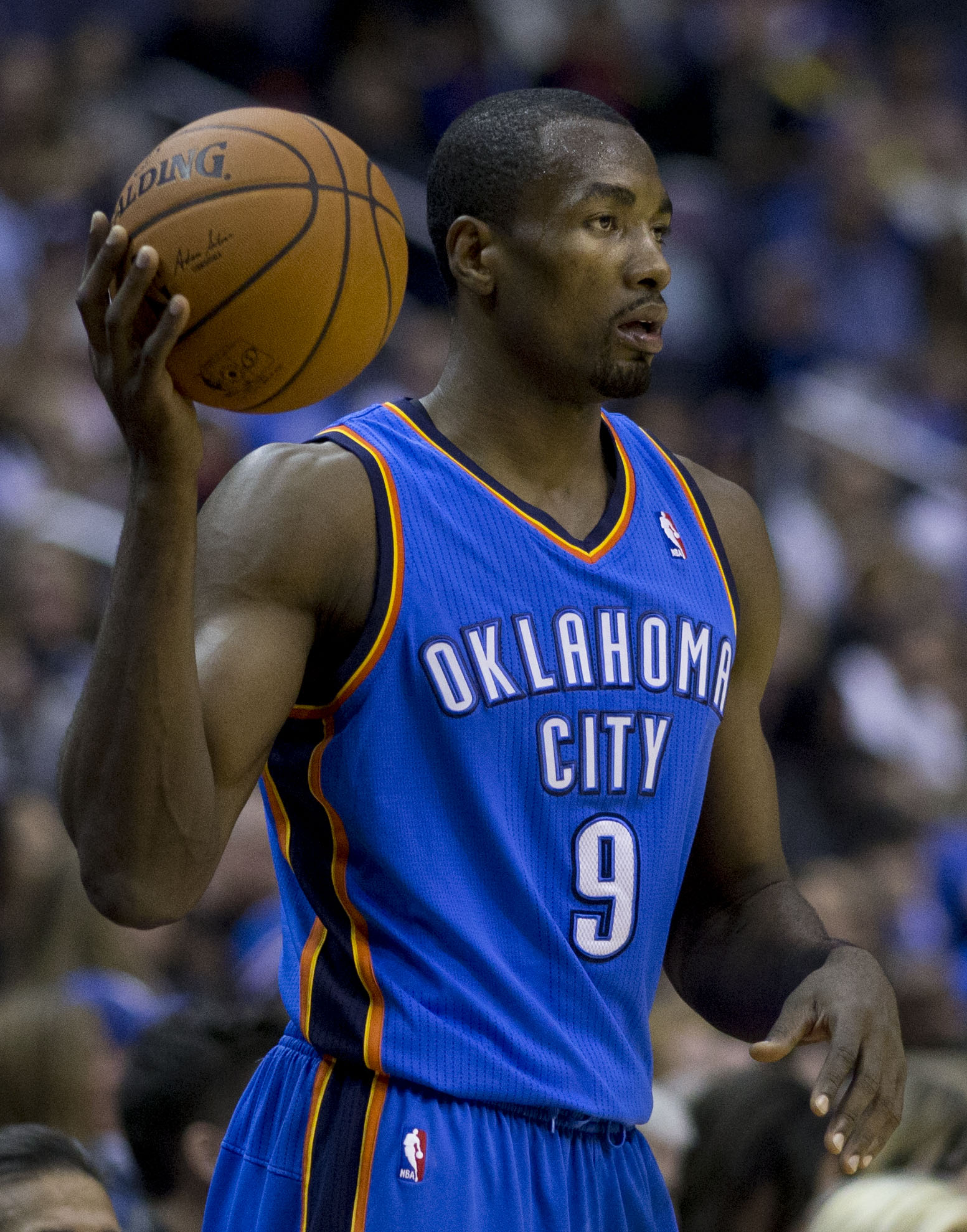
Ibaka in 2014

In 2013–14, Ibaka averaged career highs of 15.1 points and 8.8 rebounds per game, and led the league in total blocks (219) for the fourth straight season. In a series-clinching win over the Los Angeles Clippers in the Western Conference Semifinals, Ibaka suffered a left calf injury that was expected to sideline him for the remainder of the 2014 playoffs. However, Ibaka returned in Game 3 against the San Antonio Spurs in the Western Conference Finals. The Thunder eventually fell to the Spurs in six games as Ibaka averaged 12.2 points, 7.3 rebounds, and 2.4 blocks throughout the playoffs. Ibaka was also named to the NBA All-Defensive First Team for the third consecutive year.

On 19 February 2015, Ibaka recorded 21 points and a career-high 22 rebounds in a 104–89 victory over the Dallas Mavericks. On 17 March, he was ruled out for four to six weeks after undergoing arthroscopic surgery to address right knee soreness.

On 4 January 2016, Ibaka scored a season-high 25 points in a loss to the Sacramento Kings.

=== Orlando Magic (2016–2017) ===
On 23 June 2016, Ibaka was traded to the Orlando Magic in exchange for Victor Oladipo, Ersan İlyasova, and the draft rights to Domantas Sabonis, the 11th pick of the 2016 NBA draft. He made his debut for the Magic in their season opener on 26 October, recording 14 points and seven rebounds in a 108–96 loss to the Miami Heat. On 13 November, Ibaka scored a career-high 31 points and hit a game-winning baseline jumper to lead the Magic to a 119–117 victory over his former team, the Oklahoma City Thunder.

=== Toronto Raptors (2017–2020) ===
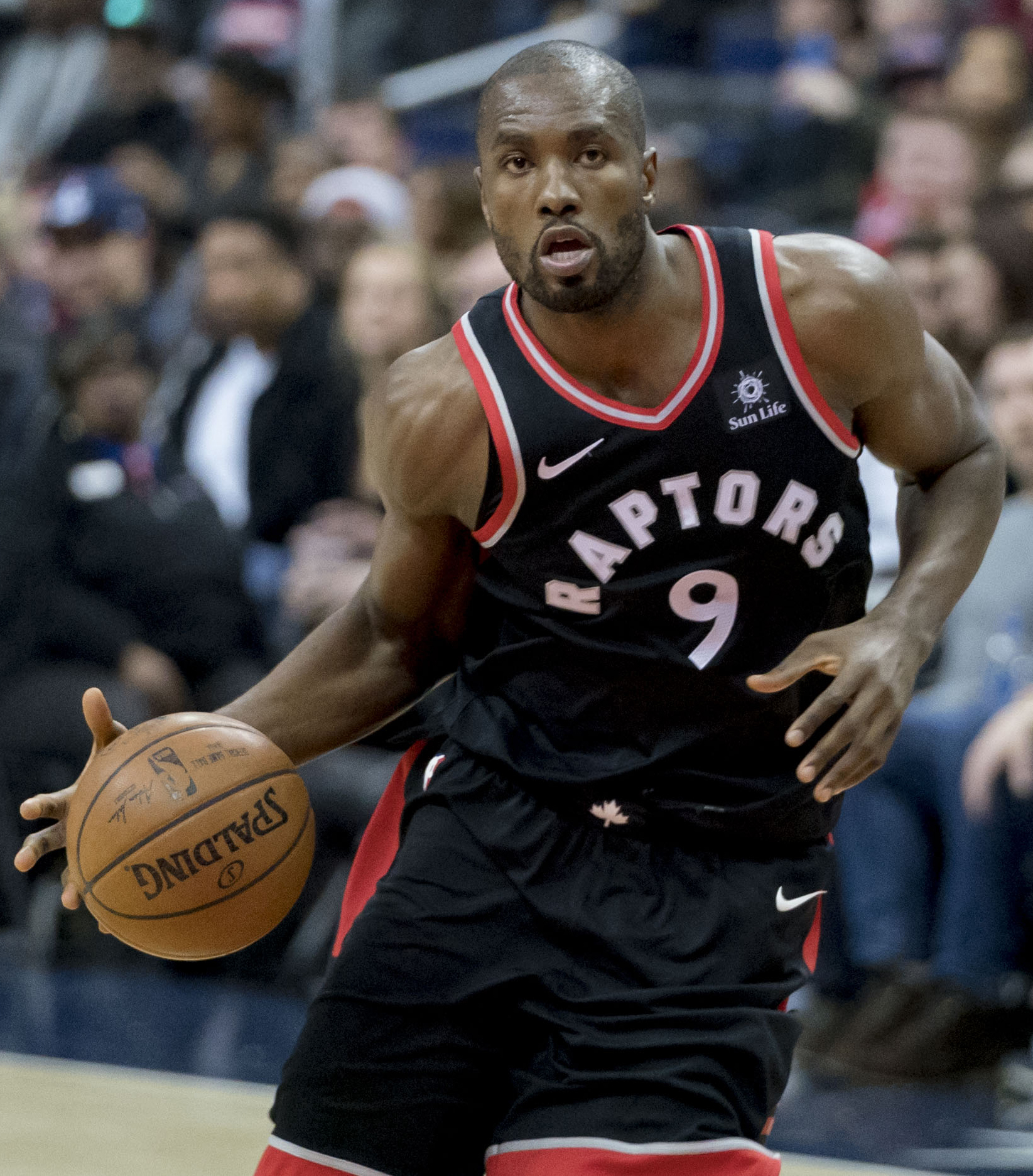
Ibaka in 2018

On 14 February 2017, Ibaka was traded to the Toronto Raptors in exchange for Terrence Ross and a future first-round draft pick (later used to draft Anžejs Pasečņiks). He made his Raptors debut 10 days later, scoring 15 points in a 107–97 victory over the Boston Celtics. On 21 March against the Chicago Bulls, Ibaka was ejected after an altercation with Bulls' center Robin Lopez. The next day, Ibaka received a one-game suspension.

On 7 July 2017, Ibaka re-signed with the Raptors to a reported three-year, $65 million contract. On 10 January 2018, he was suspended for one game without pay for an altercation with James Johnson during a game against the Miami Heat a day earlier.

On 4 November 2018, Ibaka made his first 14 shots on the way to a career-high 34 points in a 121–107 victory over the Los Angeles Lakers. He finished the game 15 of 17 from the field and became the first player to start a game 14 of 14 from the field since Shaquille O'Neal did it in February 2006. On 3 February 2019, Ibaka had 16 points and 12 rebounds in a 121–103 victory over the Los Angeles Clippers, marking a career-best sixth straight double-double, Toronto's longest streak since Chris Bosh had eight in November 2009. On 12 March, Ibaka was suspended for three games without pay due to an altercation with Marquese Chriss during a game against the Cleveland Cavaliers. In June 2019, Ibaka helped the Raptors defeat the Golden State Warriors in six games during the NBA Finals to win his first NBA championship.

On 5 February 2020, Ibaka hit a game winning three pointer to lead the Raptors to a narrow 119–118 victory over the Indiana Pacers, extending the Raptors' win streak to 12, a franchise record.

=== Los Angeles Clippers (2020–2022) ===
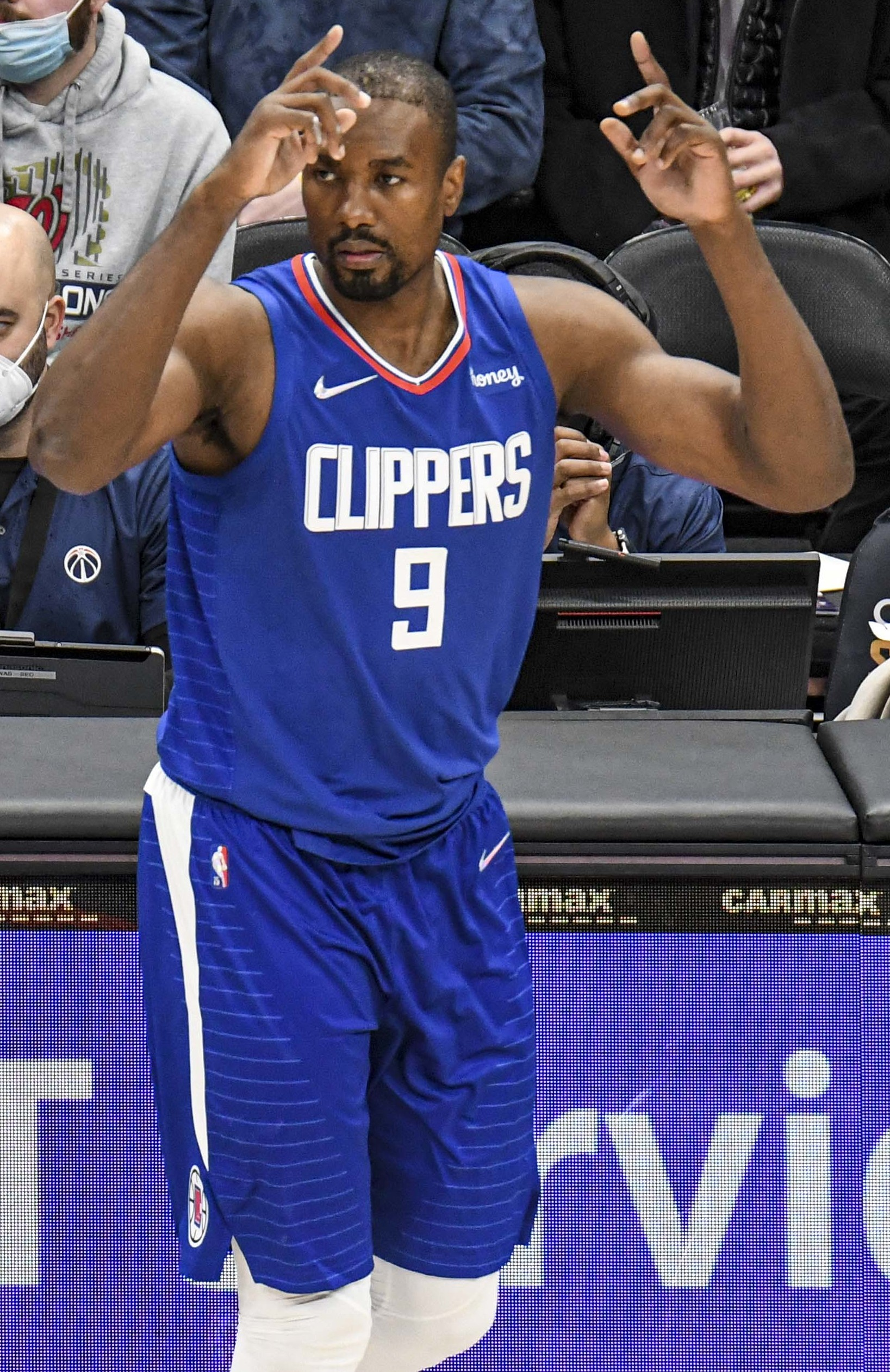
Ibaka in 2022

On 25 November 2020, Ibaka signed with the Los Angeles Clippers. He was reunited with former Raptors teammate Kawhi Leonard, both of whom were part of the 2018–19 championship squad. In his first game with the Clippers, Ibaka had 15 points and six rebounds in a 116–109 victory over the Lakers. On 24 February 2021, Ibaka recorded 21 points, nine rebounds, and six assists during a 128–111 victory over the Cleveland Cavaliers.

=== Milwaukee Bucks (2022–2023) ===
On 10 February 2022, Ibaka was traded to the Milwaukee Bucks as part of a four-team trade that sent Rodney Hood and Semi Ojeleye to the Clippers.

On 19 July 2022, the Bucks re-signed Ibaka to a one-year contract. In January 2023, the Bucks mutually agreed with Ibaka to trade him.

On 9 February 2023, Ibaka was traded to the Indiana Pacers alongside Jordan Nwora and George Hill in a four-team trade involving the Brooklyn Nets and Phoenix Suns. However, he was waived by the Pacers two days later.

=== Bayern Munich (2023–2024) ===
On 16 September 2023, Ibaka signed with Bayern Munich of the German Basketball Bundesliga (BBL) and the EuroLeague. On 15 July 2024, Ibaka parted ways with the German club.

=== Return to Real Madrid (2024–2025) ===
On 26 July 2024, Ibaka signed a one-year deal with Real Madrid. On 2 July 2025, Ibaka amicably parted ways with the Spanish powerhouse.

== National team career ==
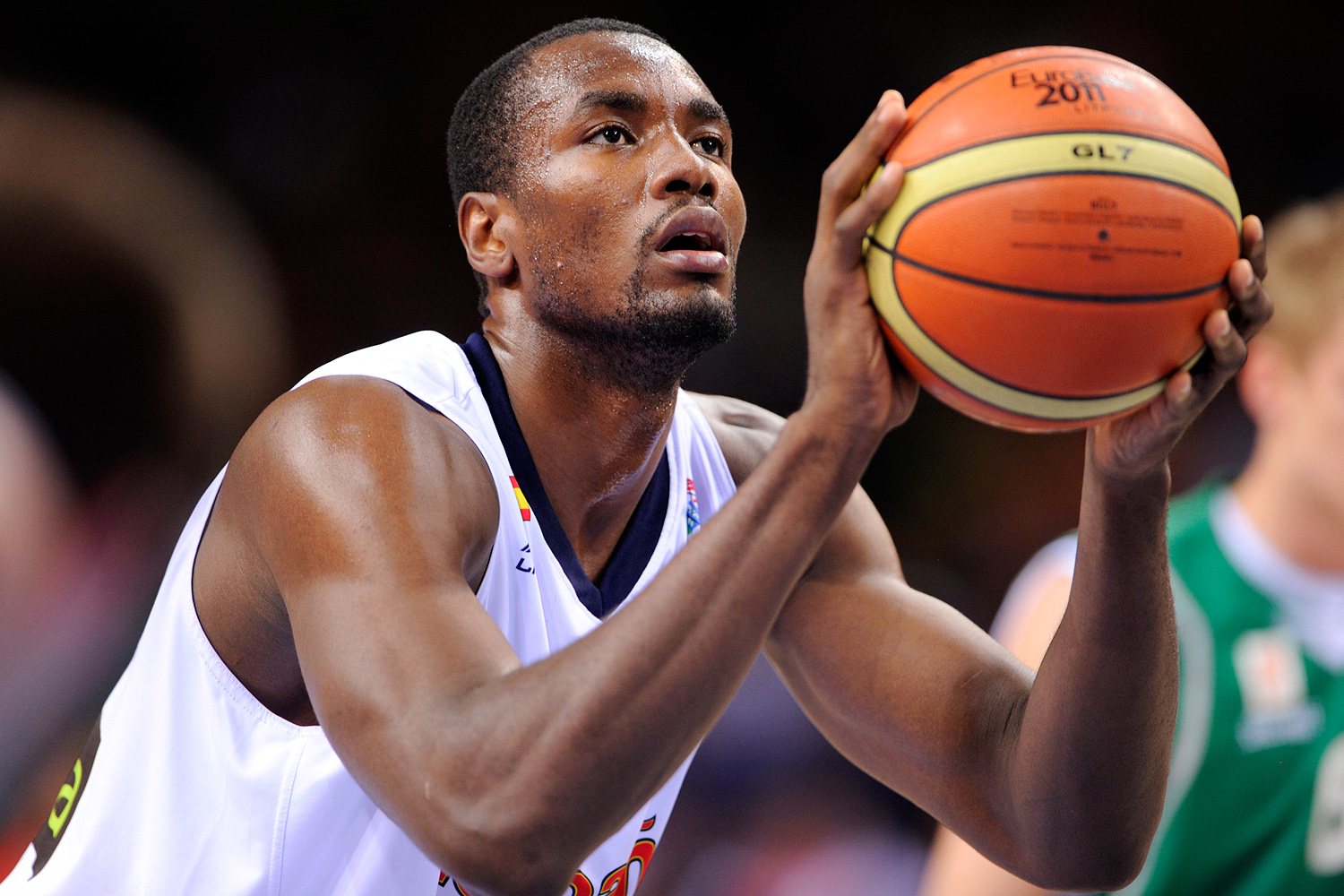
Ibaka in action for the Spain national basketball team

At a youth level, Ibaka represented the Republic of the Congo. At the 2006 FIBA Africa Under-18 Championship in Durban, he led all players in scoring and rebounds with an average of 18.6 points and 13.8 rebounds respectively.

Years later, Ibaka expressed a desire to play for the Spain national basketball team. After living in the country for four years, he was granted Spanish citizenship on 15 July 2011. His team won the gold medal in the Eurobasket 2011, beating France in the final by a score of 98–85. He won a silver medal with Spain at the 2012 Summer Olympics.

== Personal life ==
Ibaka speaks four languages: Lingala, French, English, and Spanish.

Ibaka is a chef, and on his YouTube series How Hungry Are You?, Ibaka, who refers to himself as Mafuzzy Chef, has served numerous delicacies to his teammates, including beef penis to Kawhi Leonard , snake to former teammate and friend Kevin Durant, and lamb brain to the Raptors bench players. Having experienced hunger and poverty during his childhood, Ibaka has also sponsored drop-in meal programs in Toronto through his Serge Ibaka Foundation.

Ibaka is known for his sophisticated fashion. In 2019, Ibaka was named to Vanity Fair's Best Dressed List. He refers to his sartorial efforts as “Art”.

Ibaka has a daughter who was born shortly after he left the Republic of the Congo when Ibaka was still a teenager. She was raised by her mother and Ibaka's father, with neither Ibaka nor his daughter knowing of each other until she was three years old. They met for the first time when she was five years old. Ranie's mother conveyed the news to Desire, Ibaka's father, who chose to keep it a secret. Desire believed that if Ibaka were aware of his child at home, he might not have continued his basketball career.

Ibaka's younger brother, Igor, is a former NCAA basketball player for the Oklahoma State Cowboys.

On 3 April 2017, Ibaka was announced as the newest member elected to the board of directors of the National Basketball Players Association (NBPA) Foundation, the charitable arm of the NBPA which provides strategic funding and support for players' community engagement initiatives worldwide.

Ibaka is related to Romanian actor and TV host Cabral Ibacka.

== Career statistics ==
Legend
GP	Games played	GS	Games started	MPG	Minutes per game
FG%	Field-goal percentage	3P%	3-point field-goal percentage	FT%	Free-throw percentage
RPG	Rebounds per game	APG	Assists per game	SPG	Steals per game
BPG	Blocks per game	PPG	Points per game	PIR	Performance index rating
**Bold**	Career high

=== NBA ===
†	Denotes season in which Ibaka’s team won the NBA title
*	Led the league

==== Regular season ====
Year	Team	GP	GS	MPG	FG%	3P%	FT%	RPG	APG	SPG	BPG	PPG
2009–10	Oklahoma City	73	0	18.1	.543	**.500**	.630	5.4	.1	.3	1.3	6.3
2010–11	Oklahoma City	**82**	44	27.0	.543	.000	.750	7.6	.3	.4	2.4	9.9
2011–12	Oklahoma City	66*	66*	27.2	.535	.333	.661	7.5	.4	.5	**3.7***	9.1
2012–13	Oklahoma City	80	80	31.1	**.573**	.351	.749	7.7	.5	.4	3.0*	13.2
2013–14	Oklahoma City	81	**81**	32.9	.536	.389	.784	**8.8**	1.0	.5	2.7	15.1
2014–15	Oklahoma City	64	64	**33.1**	.476	.376	.836	7.8	.9	.5	2.4	14.3
2015–16	Oklahoma City	78	78	32.1	.479	.326	.752	6.8	.8	.5	1.9	12.6
2016–17	Orlando	56	56	30.5	.488	.388	.846	6.8	1.1	**.6**	1.6	14.8
2016–17	Toronto	23	23	31.0	.459	.398	**.882**	6.8	.7	.3	1.4	15.1
2017–18	Toronto	76	76	27.5	.483	.360	.797	6.3	.8	.4	1.3	12.6
2018–19†	Toronto	74	51	27.2	.529	.290	.763	8.1	1.3	.4	1.4	15.0
2019–20	Toronto	55	27	27.0	.512	.385	.718	8.2	1.4	.5	.8	**15.4**
2020–21	L.A. Clippers	41	39	23.3	.510	.339	.811	6.7	**1.8**	.2	1.0	11.1
2021–22	L.A. Clippers	35	10	15.4	.490	.387	.690	4.3	1.0	.2	.7	6.6
2021–22	Milwaukee	19	2	17.8	.519	.351	.800	5.3	.7	.2	.4	7.0
2022–23	Milwaukee	16	2	11.6	.481	.333	.615	2.8	.3	.1	.4	4.1
Career		919	697	27.3	.513	.359	.757	7.1	.8	.4	1.9	12.0

==== Playoffs ====
Year	Team	GP	GS	MPG	FG%	3P%	FT%	RPG	APG	SPG	BPG	PPG
2010	Oklahoma City	6	0	25.5	.571	-	.700	6.5	.3	.3	2.0	7.8
2011	Oklahoma City	17	17	28.8	.462	.000	.825	7.3	.2	.2	**3.1**	9.8
2012	Oklahoma City	20	**20**	28.4	.528	.250	.722	5.8	.6	.6	3.0	9.8
2013	Oklahoma City	11	11	33.3	.437	.444	.792	**8.4**	.7	.0	3.0	12.8
2014	Oklahoma City	15	15	**33.7**	**.622**	.333	.750	7.3	.5	.7	2.4	12.1
2016	Oklahoma City	18	18	33.4	.521	.449	.750	6.3	.6	**.8**	1.3	12.0
2017	Toronto	10	10	30.7	.462	.316	.846	6.5	**1.4**	.4	1.7	14.3
2018	Toronto	10	9	26.0	.417	.375	.818	5.9	1.1	.1	1.3	8.7
2019†	Toronto	**24**	0	20.8	.477	.237	.762	6.0	.9	.5	1.0	9.4
2020	Toronto	11	0	22.8	.573	**.511**	**1.000**	7.7	1.2	.2	1.3	**14.8**
2021	L.A. Clippers	2	0	9.0	.500	.000	**1.000**	2.0	1.0	.5	1.5	5.0
2022	Milwaukee	6	0	3.7	.250	.000	.500	1.7	.0	.0	.0	1.5
Career		152	102	27.1	.499	.382	.789	6.3	.7	.4	1.9	10.6

=== EuroLeague ===
Year	Team	GP	GS	MPG	FG%	3P%	FT%	RPG	APG	SPG	BPG	PPG	PIR
2011–12	Real Madrid	6	0	14.9	.571	.000	**.818**	4.7	.0	**.5**	**2.0**	5.5	9.2
2023–24	Bayern Munich	**28**	**26**	**24.7**	**.598**	**.480**	.667	**6.8**	**1.2**	**.5**	1.2	**12.6**	**15.8**
2024–25	Real Madrid	29	2	12.9	.563	.317	.750	3.2	0.7	0.2	0.5	6.2	6.0
Career		63	28	18.0	.577	.407	.713	5.0	0.8	.3	1.0	9.0	10.7

=== Domestic leagues ===
Year	Team	League	GP	MPG	FG%	3P%	FT%	RPG	APG	SPG	BPG	PPG
2007–08	(Spain) L'Hospitalet	LEB Oro	28	26.4	.528	.250	.641	8.4	.3	.6	3.1	11.9
2008–09	(Spain) Manresa	ACB	31	16.1	.550	.250	.721	4.5	.2	.3	.3	7.1
2011–12	(Spain) Real Madrid	ACB	6	14.6	.581	.000	1.000	4.0	—	.7	2.0	6.7
2021–22	(United States) A. C. Clippers	G League	4	27.5	.431	.316	.700	9.3	2.5	.3	1.3	15.5
2023–24	(Germany) Bayern Munich	BBL	31	21.2	.567	.283	.671	5.7	1.7	.3	1.2	10.5

== See also ==
- List of NBA career blocks leaders
- List of NBA career playoff blocks leaders
- List of NBA annual blocks leaders
- List of NBA single-game blocks leaders
- List of European basketball players in the United States
