= Rodney Mott =

Basketball referee (born 1957)

- Born: September 3, 1957 (age 68); New Albany, Indiana, U.S.
- Education: San Diego State University (1986)
- Basketball career
- Position: NBA referee
- Officiating career: 1998–present

Rodney Mott is a referee in the National Basketball Association, where he has worked since 1998.

== Career ==
On January 12, 2007, Mott was suspended for three games after making obscene gestures and using obscenities toward fans during a game.

Mott officiated the 2013 NBA All-Star Game.
