= Bennie Adams =

American basketball referee

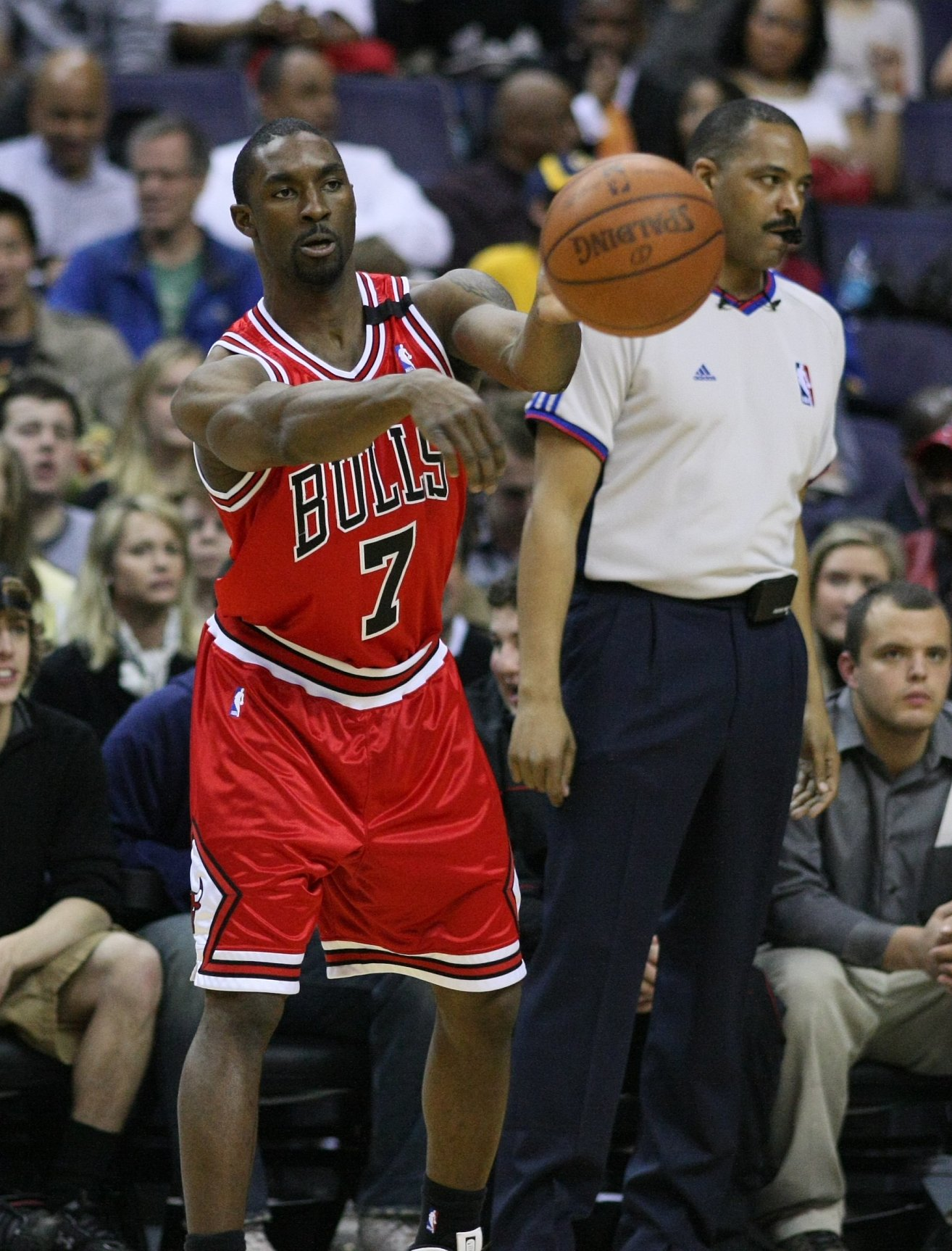
Adams (right) officiating the Chicago Bulls/Washington Wizards game on February 27, 2009.

Bennie Adams (born April 8, 1967) is an American professional basketball referee in the National Basketball Association.

In a regular season game between the San Antonio Spurs and the Los Angeles Lakers on April 12, 2011, Adams called a technical foul on Lakers guard Kobe Bryant. In frustration of the call, Bryant called Adams a derogatory gay term. On the following day, the NBA fined Bryant $100,000. The Lakers and Bryant later apologized for the use of the word.
