= 2017 NBA playoffs =

Postseason tournament

Tournament details
- Dates: April 15–June 12, 2017
- Season: 2016–17
- Teams: 16

Final positions
- Champions: Golden State Warriors (5th title)
- Runners-up: Cleveland Cavaliers
- Semifinalists: San Antonio Spurs; Boston Celtics

Tournament statistics
- Scoring leader(s): LeBron James (Cavaliers) (32.8 PPG)

Awards
- MVP: Kevin Durant (Warriors)

The 2017 NBA playoffs was the postseason tournament of the 2016–17 season. The playoffs began on April 15, 2017, and ended on June 12, with the Western Conference champion Golden State Warriors defeating the Eastern Conference champion and defending champion Cleveland Cavaliers in the NBA Finals. It was the first time in NBA Finals history that the same two teams appeared in three consecutive Finals. The Warriors finished with the best postseason record in NBA history, spanning a win-loss record of 16–1 (.941). Kevin Durant, who joined the Warriors by signing, made his second NBA Finals appearance, having previously lost in 2012 with the Oklahoma City Thunder to the Miami Heat.

== Overview ==
=== Western Conference ===
- The Golden State Warriors clinched the best record in the league for 3rd straight season and entered their fifth consecutive postseason for the first time since making six straight appearances from 1947 to 1952.
- The San Antonio Spurs entered their 20th consecutive postseason which was the longest active playoffs streak in Major North American Sports after the Detroit Red Wings of the NHL missed the playoffs for the 1st time in 25 years, including back–to–back 60+ wins for the first time in franchise history. However, they were swept by the Golden State Warriors in the Conference Finals after Kawhi Leonard's ankle injury in Game 1, forcing him to miss the rest of the series.
- The Houston Rockets entered their fifth consecutive postseason. However, they were eliminated by the San Antonio Spurs in the Conference Semifinals.
- The Los Angeles Clippers entered their franchise record sixth consecutive postseason. However, they were eliminated by the Utah Jazz in the first round.
- The Utah Jazz clinched the playoffs spot for the first time since 2012 and their first playoffs series win since 2010. However, they were swept by the Golden State Warriors in the Conference Semifinals.
- The Oklahoma City Thunder entered their second consecutive postseason. However, they were eliminated by the Houston Rockets in the first round, their earliest exit since 2010.
- The Memphis Grizzlies entered their seventh consecutive postseason. However, they were eliminated by the San Antonio Spurs in the first round for the second straight year.
- The Portland Trail Blazers entered their fourth consecutive postseason. However, they were swept by the Golden State Warriors in the first round.

=== Eastern Conference ===
- The Boston Celtics entered their third consecutive postseason and clinched the best record in the Eastern Conference for the first time since 2008. However, they were eliminated by the Cleveland Cavaliers in the Conference Finals.
- The defending champions Cleveland Cavaliers entered their third consecutive postseason. However, they were defeated by the Golden State Warriors in the NBA Finals, dashing their hopes of back–to–back titles.
- The Toronto Raptors entered their fourth consecutive postseason, including back–to–back 50+ wins for the first time in franchise history. However, they were swept by the Cleveland Cavaliers in the Conference Semifinals.
- The Washington Wizards, Milwaukee Bucks and Chicago Bulls clinched a playoff spot for the first time since 2015. Milwaukee and Chicago were eliminated by Toronto and Boston, respectively. The Washington Wizards were eliminated by the Boston Celtics in the Conference Semifinals. It should also be noted that Game 6 of the Wizards–Celtics game was the last time before Verizon Center renames to Capital One Arena.
- The Atlanta Hawks entered their 10th consecutive postseason, one shy of their postseason streak of 11 (1963–73). However, they were eliminated by the Washington Wizards in the first round.
- The Indiana Pacers entered their second consecutive postseason. However, they were swept by the Cleveland Cavaliers in the first round.
- With a 4th seed in the playoffs, the Wizards had their highest seed under a 16–team playoff format.

=== First round ===
- This was the first time, in a best–of–7 series, that an 8th seed (Chicago Bulls) went up 2–0 against a 1st seed (Boston Celtics) in the first round. It is the second time this happened overall; the Los Angeles Lakers did it against the Phoenix Suns in 1993, which was a best–of–five series that Phoenix eventually won 3 games to 2.
- Cleveland became the first team in playoffs history to come back from a 25–point halftime deficit and win when they beat the Pacers in Game 3.
- The Cavaliers became the first team to sweep an opponent while giving up 100+ points every game since the Houston Rockets allowed 100+ in all 4 games during their sweep of the Orlando Magic in the 1995 NBA Finals.
- The Boston Celtics became the 19th team to come back after trailing 2–0, against the Bulls. They were also the 4th team in NBA history to lose the first two games of a best–of–7 series at home and still win the series.
- Game 7 between the Los Angeles Clippers and Utah Jazz ensured an 18th-straight postseason in which at least one Game 7 was played; 1999 was the last postseason to not feature a Game 7.
- The Clippers became the first NBA team to blow five straight postseason series leads.
- It was the first series win for the Toronto Raptors where they didn't need all the games of the series. Previously they had beaten the Knicks in 2001 in a best of 5 in five games. In 2016 their two series wins were obtained in seven games each.

=== Conference semifinals ===
- The Houston Rockets are the first team to open their series with a blowout only to get blown out in the second game.
- Trailing by 14 and 13 in Games 1 and 2 respectively, the Boston Celtics became the first team to come back and win back–to–back games after trailing by double digits in the first quarter.
- The 27–point loss in Game 1 is San Antonio's largest defeat in a postseason home game.
- Scoring 125 points in a Game 2 blowout victory against the Toronto Raptors, the Cleveland Cavaliers set a franchise record for most points scored in a postseason game. Their previous record was 124, in 2010.
- 18 of 21 conference semifinals games were decided by 10 points or more. Eight of these games were decided by over 20 points.
- With a four–game sweep against the Raptors, the Cleveland Cavaliers became the second team to have six playoffs series sweeps in three consecutive postseasons (2015–2017) since the Lakers did it in 1987–1989. They also became the first team to start 8–0 in two straight playoffs.
- The Cavaliers' Game 4 win over the Raptors gave them their 11th consecutive postseason win (a streak dating back to Game 5 of the 2016 NBA Finals), setting a franchise record.
- With a four–game sweep against Utah, Golden State swept consecutive playoff series for the first time in franchise history and also had their best eight–game postseason start in franchise history.
- The Cavaliers and Warriors both started the NBA postseason with 8–0 records, the first time in NBA history that two teams started 8–0 in the same postseason since switching to a seven-game format.
- In a series–ending 114–75 loss against the Spurs, the Houston Rockets set an NBA record for fewest two–point field goals made in a game. They made 9 of 37, while the previous record was 11 of 41.

=== Conference finals ===
- After trailing as much as 25 points, Golden State Warriors came back and won against the San Antonio Spurs in Game 1. This is the second largest comeback in the Conference Finals since the Celtics came back from 26 to beat the Nets in Game 3 of the 2002 Eastern Conference Finals.
- With a 36–point win against the San Antonio Spurs in Game 2, this is the Golden State Warriors' 2nd largest margin of victory in postseason history. (The largest is 39-point set back in 1948, which would be surpassed in the following year when the Warriors defeat Rockets by 41.)
- After trailing as much as 21 points, the Boston Celtics surged back with a 28–10 third quarter run against the Cleveland Cavaliers to win Game 3. This was also the Cavaliers' first loss this postseason, as well as their first loss in a postseason game since Game 4 of the previous year's Finals, snapping an NBA playoff record tying 13 game winning streak.
- With a four-game sweep against the San Antonio Spurs, the Golden State Warriors earned the distinction of having a 12–0 postseason record, the first in NBA history. They are also the first team to have 3 best–of–7 series sweeps, and join the 1988–89 Los Angeles Lakers (who ironically, would get swept themselves by the Detroit Pistons) and the 2000–01 Lakers as the only teams to be undefeated going into the championship round, and the only one to have done it under the 7–7–7–7 format since it was introduced in 2003.

=== NBA Finals ===
The Golden State Warriors began the finals with a playoff record of 12–0. They dominated the first two games, and although game three was more competitive, the Warriors still came out victors. They took a 3–0 lead bringing them to 15–0 in the playoffs, the best ever start in NBA playoff history. The Cavs countered beating the Warriors 137–116 in Game four, with 86 points in the first half, setting an NBA Finals' record. On June 12, the Warriors bounced back and won game five at home 129–120, clinching the organization's fifth championship. Golden State's 16–1 record is an NBA playoff record since 2001 for fewest games attempted to achieve an NBA championship. The title was the first for All–Star forward Kevin Durant and the second in three years for All–Stars Stephen Curry, Klay Thompson, and Draymond Green. Durant, who scored over 30 points in each of the five games (the first player to do so since Shaquille O'Neal in 2000 with Los Angeles), was the recipient of the 2017 Bill Russell NBA Finals MVP award.

== Format ==
Within each conference, the eight teams with the most wins qualify for the playoffs. The seedings are based on each team's record.

Each conference's bracket is fixed; there is no reseeding. All rounds are best-of-seven series; the team that has four wins advances to the next round. As stated above, all rounds, including the NBA Finals, are in a 2–2–1–1–1 format. Home court advantage in any round belongs to the higher-seeded team, who has the better regular season record. If two teams with the same record meet in a round, standard tiebreaker rules are used. The rule for determining home court advantage in the NBA Finals is winning percentage, then head-to-head record, followed by record vs. opposite conference.

== Playoff qualifying ==
The Cleveland Cavaliers became the first Eastern Conference team to clinch a playoff spot on March 19, 2017.

=== Eastern Conference ===
Seed	Team	Record	Clinched			
Seed	Team	Record	Playoff berth	Division title	Best record in conference	Best record in NBA
1	Boston Celtics	53–29	March 21	April 10	April 12	—
2	Cleveland Cavaliers	51–31	March 19	March 24	—	—
3	Toronto Raptors	51–31	March 25	—	—	—
4	Washington Wizards	49–33	March 24	March 28	—	—
5	Atlanta Hawks	43–39	April 8	—	—	—
6	Milwaukee Bucks	42–40	April 8	—	—	—
7	Indiana Pacers	42–40	April 12	—	—	—
8	Chicago Bulls	41–41	April 12	—	—	—

=== Western Conference ===
Seed	Team	Record	Clinched			
Seed	Team	Record	Playoff berth	Division title	Best record in Conference	Best record in NBA
1	Golden State Warriors	67–15	February 25	March 16	April 5	April 5
2	San Antonio Spurs	61–21	March 4	March 31	—	—
3	Houston Rockets	55–27	March 14	—	—	—
4	Los Angeles Clippers	51–31	March 25	—	—	—
5	Utah Jazz	51–31	March 26	April 7	—	—
6	Oklahoma City Thunder	47–35	March 29	—	—	—
7	Memphis Grizzlies	43–39	March 31	—	—	—
8	Portland Trail Blazers	41–41	April 9	—	—	—

== Bracket ==
Teams in bold advanced to the next round. The numbers to the left of each team indicate the team's seeding in its conference, and the numbers to the right indicate the number of games the team won in that round. The division champions are marked with an asterisk. Teams with home court advantage are shown in Italics.

First Round	Conference Semifinals
**E1**	**Boston***	**4**
E8	Chicago	2
**E1**	**Boston***	**4**
E4	Washington*	3
**E4**	**Washington***	**4**
E5	Atlanta	2
**Eastern Conference**
**E3**	**Toronto**	**4**
E6	Milwaukee	2
E3	Toronto	0
**E2**	**Cleveland***	**4**
**E2**	**Cleveland***	**4**
E7	Indiana	0
**W1**	**Golden State***	**4**
W8	Portland	0
**W1**	**Golden State***	**4**
W5	Utah*	0
W4	LA Clippers	3
**W5**	**Utah***	**4**
**Western Conference**
**W3**	**Houston**	**4**
W6	Oklahoma City	1
W3	Houston	2
**W2**	**San Antonio***	**4**
**W2**	**San Antonio***	**4**
W7	Memphis	2

Conference Finals
E1	Boston*	1
**E2**	**Cleveland***	**4**
**W1**	**Golden State***	**4**
W2	San Antonio*	0

NBA Finals
E2	Cleveland*	1
**W1**	**Golden State***	**4**

- * Division winner
- **Bold** Series winner
- Italic Team with home-court advantage

== First round ==
All times are in Eastern Daylight Time (UTC−04:00)

=== Eastern Conference first round ===
==== (1) Boston Celtics vs. (8) Chicago Bulls ====
TNT

April 16
6:30 PM

Boxscore

Chicago Bulls 106, Boston Celtics 102
Scoring by quarter: 23–28, 25–18, 26–28, 32–28
Pts: Jimmy Butler 30; Rebs: Robin Lopez 11; Asts: Rondo, Wade 6 each	Pts: Isaiah Thomas 33; Rebs: Jae Crowder 8 Asts: Al Horford 8
Chicago leads series, 1–0

TD Garden, Boston, Massachusetts
Attendance: 18,624
Referees: Mike Callahan, Kane Fitzgerald, David Guthrie

TNT

April 18
8:00 PM

Boxscore

Chicago Bulls 111, Boston Celtics 97
Scoring by quarter: 31–26, 23–20, 32–29, 25–22
Pts: Butler, Wade 22 each Rebs: Rajon Rondo 9 Asts: Rajon Rondo 14	Pts: Isaiah Thomas 20; Rebs: Al Horford 11; Asts: Kelly Olynyk 7
Chicago leads series, 2–0

TD Garden, Boston, Massachusetts
Attendance: 18,624
Referees: James Capers, John Goble, Sean Wright

ESPN

April 21
7:00 PM

Boxscore

Boston Celtics 104, Chicago Bulls 87
Scoring by quarter: 33–15, 11–26, 32–22, 28–24
Pts: Al Horford 18; Rebs: Al Horford 8 Asts: Isaiah Thomas 9	Pts: Dwyane Wade 18; Rebs: Cristiano Felício 11; Asts: three players 3 each
Chicago leads series, 2–1

United Center, Chicago, Illinois
Attendance: 21,293
Referees: Monty McCutchen, Brian Forte, Bill Spooner

TNT

April 23
6:30 PM

Boxscore

Boston Celtics 104, Chicago Bulls 95
Scoring by quarter: 30–18, 27–28, 22–24, 25–25
Pts: Isaiah Thomas 33; Rebs: Al Horford 12; Asts: Isaiah Thomas 7	Pts: Jimmy Butler 33; Rebs: Bobby Portis 8 Asts: Jimmy Butler 9
Series tied, 2–2

United Center, Chicago, Illinois
Attendance: 21,863
Referees: Scott Foster, Eric Lewis, Tom Washington

TNT

April 26
8:30 PM

Boxscore

Chicago Bulls 97, Boston Celtics 108
Scoring by quarter: 20–23, 30–29, 31–27, 16–29
Pts: Dwyane Wade 26; Rebs: Dwyane Wade 11; Asts: Dwyane Wade 8	Pts: Bradley, Thomas 24 each Rebs: Al Horford 7 Asts: Al Horford 9
Boston leads series, 3–2

TD Garden, Boston, Massachusetts
Attendance: 18,624
Referees: Danny Crawford, Sean Corbin, Ed Malloy

ESPN

April 28
8:00 PM

Boxscore

Boston Celtics 105, Chicago Bulls 83
Scoring by quarter: 30–23, 24–18, 34–18, 17–24
Pts: Avery Bradley 23; Rebs: Horford, Olynyk 6 each Asts: Al Horford 7	Pts: Jimmy Butler 23; Rebs: Bobby Portis 11; Asts: Dwyane Wade 3
Boston wins series, 4–2

United Center, Chicago, Illinois
Attendance: 21,682
Referees: Mike Callahan, Bill Kennedy, James Williams

The Celtics become the fourth team to win a best-of-seven playoff series after losing the first 2 games at home. After trailing 2–0 in the series, the Celtics came back to tie the series as Rajon Rondo was ruled out indefinitely after breaking his right thumb in Game 2, and Al Horford scored 18 points and grabbed 8 rebounds in Game 3, and Isaiah Thomas scorched the Bulls for 33 points in Game 4. The Celtics' win in Game 5 would be the only home game victory of the series, and Avery Bradley scored 23 points in Game 6 as the Celtics eliminated the Bulls. Notably, this series began one day following the death of Chyna Thomas, younger sister of Isaiah, in a one-car accident. Thomas played all six games of the series, before returning to the state of Washington for her funeral on April 29. Game 6 also marked the final game of Jimmy Butler's tenure as a Bull.

Regular-season series
Tied 2–2 in the regular-season series

October 27, 2016

Recap

Boston Celtics 99, Chicago Bulls 105

United Center, Chicago, Illinois

November 2, 2016

Recap

Chicago Bulls 100, Boston Celtics 107

TD Garden, Boston, Massachusetts

February 16, 2017

Recap

Boston Celtics 103, Chicago Bulls 104

United Center, Chicago, Illinois

March 12, 2017

Recap

Chicago Bulls 80, Boston Celtics 100

TD Garden, Boston, Massachusetts

This was the fifth playoff meeting between these two teams, with the Celtics winning the first four meetings.

Previous playoff series
Boston leads 4–0 in all-time playoff series

1981

Boston Celtics 4, Chicago Bulls 0

1981 Eastern Conference Semifinals

1986

Boston Celtics 3, Chicago Bulls 0

1986 Eastern Conference First Round

1987

Boston Celtics 3, Chicago Bulls 0

1987 Eastern Conference First Round

2009

Boston Celtics 4, Chicago Bulls 3

2009 Eastern Conference First Round

==== (2) Cleveland Cavaliers vs. (7) Indiana Pacers ====
ABC

April 15
3:00 PM

Boxscore

Indiana Pacers 108, Cleveland Cavaliers 109
Scoring by quarter: 29–34, 30–32, 25–26, 24–17
Pts: Paul George 29; Rebs: Thaddeus Young 9 Asts: Paul George 7	Pts: LeBron James 32; Rebs: Tristan Thompson 13; Asts: LeBron James 13
Cleveland leads series, 1–0

Quicken Loans Arena, Cleveland, Ohio
Attendance: 20,562
Referees: Scott Foster, Matt Boland, Tony Brothers

TNT

April 17
7:00 PM

Boxscore

Indiana Pacers 111, Cleveland Cavaliers 117
Scoring by quarter: 29–32, 29–31, 20–33, 33–21
Pts: Paul George 32; Rebs: Paul George 8 Asts: Paul George 7	Pts: Kyrie Irving 37; Rebs: Kevin Love 11; Asts: LeBron James 7
Cleveland leads series, 2–0

Quicken Loans Arena, Cleveland, Ohio
Attendance: 20,562
Referees: Marc Davis, Sean Corbin, James Williams

TNT

April 20
7:00 PM

Boxscore

Cleveland Cavaliers 119, Indiana Pacers 114
Scoring by quarter: 27–37, 22–37, 35–17, 35–23
Pts: LeBron James 41; Rebs: LeBron James 13; Asts: LeBron James 12	Pts: Paul George 36; Rebs: Paul George 15; Asts: Paul George 9
Cleveland leads series, 3–0

Bankers Life Fieldhouse, Indianapolis, Indiana
Attendance: 17,923
Referees: Danny Crawford, Tony Brown, Ron Garretson

ABC

April 23
1:00 PM

Boxscore

Cleveland Cavaliers 106, Indiana Pacers 102
Scoring by quarter: 22–24, 36–28, 30–25, 18–25
Pts: LeBron James 33; Rebs: Kevin Love 16; Asts: LeBron James 4	Pts: Lance Stephenson 22; Rebs: Thaddeus Young 10; Asts: Jeff Teague 10
Cleveland wins series, 4–0

Bankers Life Fieldhouse, Indianapolis, Indiana
Attendance: 17,923
Referees: Mike Callahan, David Guthrie, Leon Wood

In Game 1, LeBron James scored 32 points in a close battle; the Pacers came back in the 4th quarter, but C.J. Miles missed a game-winning three, giving the Cavaliers the win. But after winning Game 2, the Cavs were down by as many as 26 points in the first half of Game 3. The Pacers were in control until the Cavs led by James' triple-double of 41 points, 13 rebounds and 12 assists came roaring back in the second half and took the lead late in the fourth quarter. They would end up winning Game 3, 119–114, as they made it one of the largest comebacks in NBA playoff history. With the Pacers holding a 2-point lead with over a minute left in Game 4, James hit the three over Myles Turner, giving the Cavs a one-point lead. Later, Kyle Korver's free throws increases the lead to three. The Pacers had a chance to extend the game, but Paul George missed the three, and James secured the rebound. He would make 1 of the 2 free throws to seal the Cavs' 4-game sweep over the Pacers. Game 4 would be George's final game as a Pacer.

Regular season series
Cleveland won 3–1 in the regular-season series

November 16, 2016

Recap

Cleveland Cavaliers 93, Indiana Pacers 103

Bankers Life Fieldhouse, Indianapolis, Indiana

February 8, 2017

Recap

Cleveland Cavaliers 132, Indiana Pacers 117

Bankers Life Fieldhouse, Indianapolis, Indiana

February 15, 2017

Recap

Indiana Pacers 104, Cleveland Cavaliers 113

Quicken Loans Arena, Cleveland, Ohio

April 2, 2017

Recap

Indiana Pacers 130, Cleveland Cavaliers 135 (2OT)

Quicken Loans Arena, Cleveland, Ohio

This was the second playoff meeting between these two teams, with the Pacers winning the first meeting.

Previous playoffs series
Indiana leads 1–0 in all-time playoff series

1998

Cleveland Cavaliers 1, Indiana Pacers 3

1998 Eastern Conference First Round

==== (3) Toronto Raptors vs. (6) Milwaukee Bucks ====
ESPN, SN1

April 15
5:30 PM

Boxscore

Milwaukee Bucks 97, Toronto Raptors 83
Scoring by quarter: 30–22, 16–29, 29–19, 22–13
Pts: Giannis Antetokounmpo 28; Rebs: Greg Monroe 15; Asts: Khris Middleton 9	Pts: DeMar DeRozan 27; Rebs: Serge Ibaka 14; Asts: Kyle Lowry 6
Milwaukee leads series, 1–0

Air Canada Centre, Toronto, Ontario
Attendance: 20,133
Referees: Ken Mauer, John Goble, Ed Malloy

NBA TV, TSN

April 18
7:00 PM

Boxscore

Milwaukee Bucks 100, Toronto Raptors 106
Scoring by quarter: 25–28, 27–27, 31–29, 17–22
Pts: Giannis Antetokounmpo 24; Rebs: Giannis Antetokounmpo 15; Asts: Giannis Antetokounmpo 7	Pts: DeMar DeRozan 23; Rebs: Jonas Valančiūnas 10; Asts: Serge Ibaka 6
Series tied, 1–1

Air Canada Centre, Toronto, Ontario
Attendance: 20,077
Referees: Mike Callahan, Bill Kennedy, Mark Lindsay

NBA TV, TSN

April 20
8:00 PM

Boxscore

Toronto Raptors 77, Milwaukee Bucks 104
Scoring by quarter: 12–32, 18–25, 16–21, 31–26
Pts: Lowry, Wright 13 each Rebs: Pöltl, Valančiūnas 7 each Asts: Cory Joseph 3	Pts: Khris Middleton 20; Rebs: Giannis Antetokounmpo 8 Asts: Malcolm Brogdon 9
Milwaukee leads series, 2–1

Bradley Center, Milwaukee, Wisconsin
Attendance: 18,717
Referees: Derrick Stafford, Derrick Collins, Zach Zarba

TNT, SN1

April 22
3:00 PM

Boxscore

Toronto Raptors 87, Milwaukee Bucks 76
Scoring by quarter: 19–19, 22–22, 23–17, 23–18
Pts: DeMar DeRozan 33; Rebs: DeMar DeRozan 9 Asts: DeMar DeRozan 5	Pts: Tony Snell 19; Rebs: Khris Middleton 11; Asts: Giannis Antetokounmpo 4
Series tied, 2–2

Bradley Center, Milwaukee, Wisconsin
Attendance: 18,717
Referees: Danny Crawford, Brent Barnaky, Ron Garretson

NBA TV, TSN

April 24
7:00 PM

Boxscore

Milwaukee Bucks 93, Toronto Raptors 118
Scoring by quarter: 20–31, 28–26, 25–33, 20–28
Pts: Giannis Antetokounmpo 30; Rebs: Giannis Antetokounmpo 9 Asts: Khris Middleton 6	Pts: Norman Powell 25; Rebs: Jonas Valančiūnas 7 Asts: Kyle Lowry 10
Toronto leads series, 3–2

Air Canada Centre, Toronto, Ontario
Attendance: 20,251
Referees: James Capers, Pat Fraher, Courtney Kirkland

TNT, SN1

April 27
7:00 PM

Boxscore

Toronto Raptors 92, Milwaukee Bucks 89
Scoring by quarter: 28–24, 23–14, 23–23, 18–28
Pts: DeMar DeRozan 32; Rebs: Serge Ibaka 11; Asts: Kyle Lowry 4	Pts: Giannis Antetokounmpo 34; Rebs: Giannis Antetokounmpo 9 Asts: Khris Middleton 5
Toronto wins series, 4–2

Bradley Center, Milwaukee, Wisconsin
Attendance: 18,717
Referees: Marc Davis, Tony Brothers, Rodney Mott

Regular-season series
Toronto won 3–1 in the regular-season series

November 25, 2016

Recap

Toronto Raptors 105, Milwaukee Bucks 99

Bradley Center, Milwaukee, Wisconsin

December 12, 2016

Recap

Milwaukee Bucks 100, Toronto Raptors 122

Air Canada Centre, Toronto, Ontario

January 27, 2017

Recap

Milwaukee Bucks 86, Toronto Raptors 102

Air Canada Centre, Toronto, Ontario

March 4, 2017

Recap

Toronto Raptors 94, Milwaukee Bucks 101

Bradley Center, Milwaukee, Wisconsin

This was the first meeting in the playoffs between the Raptors and Bucks.

==== (4) Washington Wizards vs. (5) Atlanta Hawks ====
TNT

April 16
1:00 PM

Boxscore

Atlanta Hawks 107, Washington Wizards 114
Scoring by quarter: 29–25, 19–20, 28–38, 31–31
Pts: Dennis Schröder 25; Rebs: Dwight Howard 14; Asts: Dennis Schröder 9	Pts: John Wall 32; Rebs: Marcin Gortat 10; Asts: John Wall 14
Washington leads series, 1–0

Verizon Center, Washington, D.C.
Attendance: 20,356
Referees: Derrick Stafford, Derrick Collins, Zach Zarba

TNT

April 19
7:00 PM

Boxscore

Atlanta Hawks 101, Washington Wizards 109
Scoring by quarter: 24–23, 19–28, 35–23, 23–35
Pts: Paul Millsap 27; Rebs: Paul Millsap 10; Asts: Dennis Schröder 9	Pts: John Wall 32; Rebs: Marcin Gortat 10; Asts: John Wall 9
Washington leads series, 2–0

Verizon Center, Washington, D.C.
Attendance: 20,356
Referees: Marc Davis, Sean Corbin, David Guthrie

ESPN

April 22
5:30 PM

Boxscore

Washington Wizards 98, Atlanta Hawks 116
Scoring by quarter: 20–38, 26–26, 21–26, 31–26
Pts: John Wall 29; Rebs: Marcin Gortat 8 Asts: John Wall 7	Pts: Paul Millsap 29; Rebs: Paul Millsap 14; Asts: Dennis Schröder 9
Washington leads series, 2–1

Philips Arena, Atlanta, Georgia
Attendance: 18,866
Referees: James Capers, Kane Fitzgerald, Pat Fraher

ABC

April 24
8:00 PM

Boxscore

Washington Wizards 101, Atlanta Hawks 111
Scoring by quarter: 35–28, 15–31, 27–18, 24–34
Pts: Bradley Beal 32; Rebs: Marcin Gortat 18; Asts: John Wall 10	Pts: Paul Millsap 19; Rebs: Dwight Howard 15; Asts: Bazemore, Millsap 7 each
Series tied, 2–2

Philips Arena, Atlanta, Georgia
Attendance: 18,676
Referees: Ken Mauer, Ed Malloy, Leroy Richardson

TNT

April 26
6:00 PM

Boxscore

Atlanta Hawks 99, Washington Wizards 103
Scoring by quarter: 25–23, 24–27, 30–33, 20–20
Pts: Dennis Schröder 29; Rebs: Paul Millsap 11; Asts: Dennis Schröder 11	Pts: Bradley Beal 27; Rebs: Marcin Gortat 10; Asts: John Wall 14
Washington leads series, 3–2

Verizon Center, Washington, D.C.
Attendance: 20,356
Referees: Monty McCutchen, James Williams, Sean Wright

ESPN

April 28
7:30 PM

Boxscore

Washington Wizards 115, Atlanta Hawks 99
Scoring by quarter: 30–23, 35–23, 24–36, 26–17
Pts: John Wall 42; Rebs: Morris, Porter 8 each Asts: John Wall 8	Pts: Paul Millsap 31; Rebs: Paul Millsap 10; Asts: Dennis Schröder 10
Washington wins series, 4–2

Philips Arena, Atlanta, Georgia
Attendance: 18,849
Referees: Danny Crawford, John Goble, Bill Spooner

Regular-season series
Washington won 3–1 in the regular-season series

October 27, 2016

Recap

Washington Wizards 99, Atlanta Hawks 114

Philips Arena, Atlanta, Georgia

November 4, 2016

Recap

Atlanta Hawks 92, Washington Wizards 95

Verizon Center, Washington, D.C.

January 27, 2017

Recap

Washington Wizards 112, Atlanta Hawks 86

Philips Arena, Atlanta, Georgia

March 22, 2017

Recap

Atlanta Hawks 100, Washington Wizards 104

Verizon Center, Washington, D.C.

This was the sixth playoff meeting between these two teams, with the Wizards/Bullets winning three of the first five meetings.

Previous playoff series
Washington/Baltimore leads 3–2 in all-time playoff series

1965

St. Louis Hawks 1, Baltimore Bullets 3

1965 Western Division Semifinals

1966

Baltimore Bullets 0, St. Louis Hawks 3

1966 Western Division Semifinals

1978

Washington Bullets 2, Atlanta Hawks 0

1978 Eastern Conference First Round

1979

Washington Bullets 4, Atlanta Hawks 3

1979 Eastern Conference Semifinals

2015

Washington Wizards 2, Atlanta Hawks 4

2015 Eastern Conference Semifinals

=== Western Conference first round ===
==== (1) Golden State Warriors vs. (8) Portland Trail Blazers ====
ABC

April 16
3:30 PM

Boxscore

Portland Trail Blazers 109, Golden State Warriors 121
Scoring by quarter: 27–32, 29–24, 32–32, 21–33
Pts: CJ McCollum 41; Rebs: Evan Turner 10; Asts: Turner, Vonleh 4 each	Pts: Kevin Durant 32; Rebs: Draymond Green 12; Asts: Draymond Green 9
Golden State leads series, 1–0

Oracle Arena, Oakland, California
Attendance: 19,596
Referees: Monty McCutchen, Tony Brown, Ron Garretson

TNT

April 19
10:30 PM

Boxscore

Portland Trail Blazers 81, Golden State Warriors 110
Scoring by quarter: 17–33, 29–22, 12–28, 23–27
Pts: Maurice Harkless 15; Rebs: Maurice Harkless 8 Asts: Evan Turner 7	Pts: Stephen Curry 19; Rebs: Draymond Green 12; Asts: Draymond Green 10
Golden State leads series, 2–0

Oracle Arena, Oakland, California
Attendance: 19,596
Referees: Ken Mauer, Ed Malloy, Michael Smith

ESPN

April 22
10:30 PM

Boxscore

Golden State Warriors 119, Portland Trail Blazers 113
Scoring by quarter: 30–37, 24–30, 33–21, 32–25
Pts: Stephen Curry 34; Rebs: Draymond Green 8 Asts: Stephen Curry 8	Pts: CJ McCollum 32; Rebs: Jusuf Nurkić 8 Asts: Lillard, Nurkić 4 each
Golden State leads series, 3–0

Moda Center, Portland, Oregon
Attendance: 20,177
Referees: Ken Mauer, Leroy Richardson, Zach Zarba

TNT

April 24
10:30 PM

Boxscore

Golden State Warriors 128, Portland Trail Blazers 103
Scoring by quarter: 45–22, 27–26, 34–32, 22–23
Pts: Stephen Curry 37; Rebs: Curry, Pachulia 7 each Asts: Stephen Curry 8	Pts: Damian Lillard 34; Rebs: Noah Vonleh 14; Asts: Damian Lillard 6
Golden State wins series, 4–0

Moda Center, Portland, Oregon
Attendance: 19,902
Referees: Derrick Stafford, Bennie Adams, Sean Wright

Regular-season series
Golden State won 4–0 in the regular-season series

November 1, 2016

Recap

Golden State Warriors 127, Portland Trail Blazers 104

Moda Center, Portland, Oregon

December 17, 2016

Recap

Portland Trail Blazers 90, Golden State Warriors 135

Oracle Arena, Oakland, California

January 4, 2017

Recap

Portland Trail Blazers 117, Golden State Warriors 125

Oracle Arena, Oakland, California

January 29, 2017

Recap

Golden State Warriors 113, Portland Trail Blazers 111

Moda Center, Portland, Oregon

This was the second playoff meeting between these two teams, with Golden State winning the first meeting in 2016.

Previous playoffs series
Golden State leads 1–0 in all-time playoff series

2016

Portland Trail Blazers 1, Golden State Warriors 4

2016 Western Conference Semifinals

==== (2) San Antonio Spurs vs. (7) Memphis Grizzlies ====
ESPN

April 15
8:00 PM

Boxscore

Memphis Grizzlies 82, San Antonio Spurs 111
Scoring by quarter: 30–25, 19–27, 15–32, 18–27
Pts: Marc Gasol 32; Rebs: Conley, Gasol 5 each Asts: Mike Conley 7	Pts: Kawhi Leonard 32; Rebs: Dewayne Dedmon 8 Asts: Kawhi Leonard 5
San Antonio leads series, 1–0

AT&T Center, San Antonio, Texas
Attendance: 18,418
Referees: Marc Davis, Bill Kennedy, Josh Tiven

TNT

April 17
9:30 PM

Boxscore

Memphis Grizzlies 82, San Antonio Spurs 96
Scoring by quarter: 16–29, 21–27, 28–19, 17–21
Pts: Mike Conley 24; Rebs: Zach Randolph 10; Asts: Mike Conley 8	Pts: Kawhi Leonard 37; Rebs: Kawhi Leonard 11; Asts: Ginóbili, Mills 3 each
San Antonio leads series, 2–0

AT&T Center, San Antonio, Texas
Attendance: 18,418
Referees: Danny Crawford, Rodney Mott, Bill Spooner

TNT

April 20
9:30 PM

Boxscore

San Antonio Spurs 94, Memphis Grizzlies 105
Scoring by quarter: 21–21, 25–29, 17–31, 31–24
Pts: Kawhi Leonard 18; Rebs: LaMarcus Aldridge 11; Asts: three players 3 each	Pts: Mike Conley 24; Rebs: Zach Randolph 8 Asts: Mike Conley 8
San Antonio leads series, 2–1

FedExForum, Memphis, Tennessee
Attendance: 18,119
Referees: James Capers, Pat Fraher, Courtney Kirkland

ESPN

April 22
8:00 PM

Boxscore

San Antonio Spurs 108, Memphis Grizzlies 110 (OT)
Scoring by quarter: 26–23, 25–32, 20–19, 25–22, Overtime: 12–14
Pts: Kawhi Leonard 43; Rebs: Pau Gasol 11; Asts: Tony Parker 5	Pts: Mike Conley 35; Rebs: Marc Gasol 12; Asts: Mike Conley 8
Series tied, 2–2

FedExForum, Memphis, Tennessee
Attendance: 18,119
Referees: Derrick Stafford, Bennie Adams, John Goble

NBA TV

April 25
9:00 PM

Boxscore

Memphis Grizzlies 103, San Antonio Spurs 116
Scoring by quarter: 23–23, 26–32, 27–32, 27–29
Pts: Mike Conley 26; Rebs: Marc Gasol 7 Asts: Zach Randolph 6	Pts: Kawhi Leonard 28; Rebs: LaMarcus Aldridge 9 Asts: Leonard, Parker 6 each
San Antonio leads series, 3–2

AT&T Center, San Antonio, Texas
Attendance: 18,418
Referees: Mike Callahan, Tony Brothers, Derrick Collins

TNT

April 27
9:30 PM

Boxscore

San Antonio Spurs 103, Memphis Grizzlies 96
Scoring by quarter: 24–22, 21–28, 30–24, 28–22
Pts: Kawhi Leonard 28; Rebs: LaMarcus Aldridge 12; Asts: Leonard, Parker 4 each	Pts: Mike Conley 26; Rebs: Zach Randolph 11; Asts: Marc Gasol 6
San Antonio wins series, 4–2

FedExForum, Memphis, Tennessee
Attendance: 18,119
Referees: Scott Foster, Brian Forte, Zach Zarba

In game 4, Marc Gasol hit the game-winning shot with 0.7 seconds left in overtime.

Regular-season series
Tied 2–2 in the regular-season series

February 6, 2017

Recap

San Antonio Spurs 74, Memphis Grizzlies 89

FedExForum, Memphis, Tennessee

March 18, 2017

Recap

San Antonio Spurs 96, Memphis Grizzlies 104

FedExForum, Memphis, Tennessee

March 23, 2017

Recap

Memphis Grizzlies 90, San Antonio Spurs 97

AT&T Center, San Antonio, Texas

April 4, 2017

Recap

Memphis Grizzlies 89, San Antonio Spurs 95 (OT)

AT&T Center, San Antonio, Texas

This was the fifth playoff meeting between these two teams, with San Antonio winning three of the four meetings.

Previous playoff series
San Antonio leads 3–1 in all-time playoff series

2004

San Antonio Spurs 4, Memphis Grizzlies 0

2004 Western Conference First Round

2011

San Antonio Spurs 2, Memphis Grizzlies 4

2011 Western Conference First Round

2013

San Antonio Spurs 4, Memphis Grizzlies 0

2013 Western Conference Finals

2016

San Antonio Spurs 4, Memphis Grizzlies 0

2016 Western Conference First Round

==== (3) Houston Rockets vs. (6) Oklahoma City Thunder ====
TNT

April 16
9:00 PM

Boxscore

Oklahoma City Thunder 87, Houston Rockets 118
Scoring by quarter: 29–27, 25–32, 20–30, 13–29
Pts: Russell Westbrook 22; Rebs: Russell Westbrook 11; Asts: Russell Westbrook 7	Pts: James Harden 37; Rebs: Ryan Anderson 12; Asts: James Harden 9
Houston leads series, 1–0

Toyota Center, Houston, Texas
Attendance: 18,055
Referees: James Capers, Courtney Kirkland, Sean Wright

TNT

April 19
8:00 PM

Boxscore

Oklahoma City Thunder 111, Houston Rockets 115
Scoring by quarter: 35–26, 33–36, 21–24, 22–29
Pts: Russell Westbrook 51; Rebs: Russell Westbrook 10; Asts: Russell Westbrook 13	Pts: James Harden 35; Rebs: Clint Capela 10; Asts: James Harden 8
Houston leads series, 2–0

Toyota Center, Houston, Texas
Attendance: 18,055
Referees: Scott Foster, Mark Ayotte, Tony Brothers

ESPN

April 21
9:30 PM

Boxscore

Houston Rockets 113, Oklahoma City Thunder 115
Scoring by quarter: 25–34, 33–31, 25–28, 30–22
Pts: James Harden 44; Rebs: Patrick Beverley 7 Asts: James Harden 6	Pts: Russell Westbrook 32; Rebs: Russell Westbrook 13; Asts: Russell Westbrook 11
Houston leads series, 2–1

Chesapeake Energy Arena, Oklahoma City, Oklahoma
Attendance: 18,203
Referees: Scott Foster, Mark Lindsay, Tom Washington

ABC

April 23
3:30 PM

Boxscore

Houston Rockets 113, Oklahoma City Thunder 109
Scoring by quarter: 22–26, 32–32, 19–19, 40–32
Pts: Nenê 28; Rebs: Nenê 10; Asts: James Harden 8	Pts: Russell Westbrook 35; Rebs: Russell Westbrook 14; Asts: Russell Westbrook 14
Houston leads series, 3–1

Chesapeake Energy Arena, Oklahoma City, Oklahoma
Attendance: 18,203
Referees: Monty McCutchen, Brian Forte, Josh Tiven

TNT

April 25
8:00 PM

Boxscore

Oklahoma City Thunder 99, Houston Rockets 105
Scoring by quarter: 22–16, 22–35, 33–21, 22–33
Pts: Russell Westbrook 47; Rebs: Russell Westbrook 11; Asts: Russell Westbrook 9	Pts: James Harden 34; Rebs: Clint Capela 9 Asts: James Harden 4
Houston wins series, 4–1

Toyota Center, Houston, Texas
Attendance: 18,055
Referees: Marc Davis, Bill Kennedy, Zach Zarba

Regular-season series
Houston won 3–1 in the regular-season series

November 16, 2016

Recap

Houston Rockets 103, Oklahoma City Thunder 105

Chesapeake Energy Arena, Oklahoma City, Oklahoma

December 9, 2016

Recap

Houston Rockets 102, Oklahoma City Thunder 99

Chesapeake Energy Arena, Oklahoma City, Oklahoma

January 5, 2017

Recap

Oklahoma City Thunder 116, Houston Rockets 118

Toyota Center, Houston, Texas

March 26, 2017

Recap

Oklahoma City Thunder 125, Houston Rockets 137

Toyota Center, Houston, Texas

This was the eighth playoff meeting between these two teams, with the Thunder/SuperSonics winning six of the first seven meetings.

Previous playoff series
Oklahoma City/Seattle leads 6–1 in all-time playoff series

1982

Houston Rockets 1, Seattle SuperSonics 2

1982 Western Conference First Round

1987

Houston Rockets 2, Seattle SuperSonics 4

1987 Western Conference Semifinals

1989

Houston Rockets 0, Seattle SuperSonics 3

1989 Western Conference First Round

1993

Houston Rockets 3, Seattle SuperSonics 4

1993 Western Conference Semifinals

1996

Houston Rockets 0, Seattle SuperSonics 4

1996 Western Conference Semifinals

1997

Houston Rockets 4, Seattle SuperSonics 3

1997 Western Conference Semifinals

2013

Houston Rockets 2, Oklahoma City Thunder 4

2013 Western Conference First Round

- This is the most recent playoff series between the Thunder & Rockets until 2020.

==== (4) Los Angeles Clippers vs. (5) Utah Jazz ====
ESPN

April 15
10:30 PM

Boxscore

Utah Jazz 97, Los Angeles Clippers 95
Scoring by quarter: 22–24, 30–28, 22–18, 23–25
Pts: Joe Johnson 21; Rebs: Gordon Hayward 10; Asts: Boris Diaw 6	Pts: Blake Griffin 26; Rebs: DeAndre Jordan 15; Asts: Chris Paul 11
Utah leads series, 1–0

Staples Center, Los Angeles, California
Attendance: 19,060
Referees: Danny Crawford, Rodney Mott, Bill Spooner

In Game 1, Joe Johnson hits the game-winner at the buzzer.

TNT

April 18
10:30 PM

Boxscore

Utah Jazz 91, Los Angeles Clippers 99
Scoring by quarter: 18–29, 24–22, 28–28, 21–20
Pts: Gordon Hayward 20; Rebs: Favors, Hill 7 each Asts: George Hill 4	Pts: Blake Griffin 24; Rebs: DeAndre Jordan 15; Asts: Chris Paul 10
Series tied, 1–1

Staples Center, Los Angeles, California
Attendance: 19,060
Referees: Monty McCutchen, Kane Fitzgerald, Pat Fraher

ESPN2

April 21
10:00 PM

Boxscore

Los Angeles Clippers 111, Utah Jazz 106
Scoring by quarter: 21–34, 28–24, 33–26, 29–22
Pts: Chris Paul 34; Rebs: DeAndre Jordan 13; Asts: Chris Paul 10	Pts: Gordon Hayward 40; Rebs: Gordon Hayward 8 Asts: Joe Ingles 5
LA Clippers lead series, 2–1

Vivint Smart Home Arena, Salt Lake City, Utah
Attendance: 19,911
Referees: Mike Callahan, Tony Brothers, Eric Lewis

TNT

April 23
9:00 PM

Boxscore

Los Angeles Clippers 98, Utah Jazz 105
Scoring by quarter: 26–24, 26–31, 28–22, 18–28
Pts: Chris Paul 27; Rebs: DeAndre Jordan 10; Asts: Chris Paul 12	Pts: Joe Johnson 28; Rebs: Rudy Gobert 13; Asts: Joe Ingles 11
Series tied, 2–2

Vivint Smart Home Arena, Salt Lake City, Utah
Attendance: 19,911
Referees: Marc Davis, Bill Kennedy, James Williams

TNT

April 25
10:30 PM

Boxscore

Utah Jazz 96, Los Angeles Clippers 92
Scoring by quarter: 19–21, 27–22, 18–15, 32–34
Pts: Gordon Hayward 27; Rebs: Rudy Gobert 11; Asts: George Hill 7	Pts: Chris Paul 28; Rebs: DeAndre Jordan 12; Asts: Chris Paul 9
Utah leads series, 3–2

Staples Center, Los Angeles, California
Attendance: 19,171
Referees: Scott Foster, Ron Garretson, John Goble

ESPN

April 28
10:30 PM

Boxscore

Los Angeles Clippers 98, Utah Jazz 93
Scoring by quarter: 20–22, 27–23, 31–25, 20–23
Pts: Chris Paul 29; Rebs: DeAndre Jordan 18; Asts: Chris Paul 8	Pts: Gordon Hayward 31; Rebs: Rudy Gobert 9 Asts: Gordon Hayward 4
Series tied, 3–3

Vivint Smart Home Arena, Salt Lake City, Utah
Attendance: 19,911
Referees: Monty McCutchen, James Capers, Tom Washington

ABC

April 30
3:30 PM

Boxscore

Utah Jazz 104, Los Angeles Clippers 91
Scoring by quarter: 24–24, 22–15, 33–24, 25–28
Pts: Gordon Hayward 26; Rebs: Derrick Favors 11; Asts: Hill, Johnson 5 each	Pts: DeAndre Jordan 24; Rebs: DeAndre Jordan 17; Asts: Chris Paul 9
Utah wins series, 4–3

Staples Center, Los Angeles, California
Attendance: 19,060
Referees: Danny Crawford, Tony Brothers, Bill Kennedy

- Game 7 is Paul Pierce's final NBA game. It is also Chris Paul's final game with the Clippers before being traded to the Rockets during the offseason.

Regular-season series
L.A. Clippers won 3–1 in the regular-season series

October 30, 2016

Recap

Utah Jazz 75, Los Angeles Clippers 88

Staples Center, Los Angeles, California

February 13, 2017

Recap

Los Angeles Clippers 88, Utah Jazz 72

Vivint Smart Home Arena, Salt Lake City, Utah

March 13, 2017

Recap

Los Angeles Clippers 108, Utah Jazz 114

Vivint Smart Home Arena, Salt Lake City, Utah

March 25, 2017

Recap

Utah Jazz 95, Los Angeles Clippers 108

Staples Center, Los Angeles, California

This was the third playoff meeting between these two teams, with the Jazz winning the previous two meetings.

Previous playoff series
Utah leads 2–0 in all-time playoff series

1992

Los Angeles Clippers 2, Utah Jazz 3

1992 Western Conference Final Round

1997

Los Angeles Clippers 0, Utah Jazz 3

1997 Western Conference First Round

== Conference semifinals ==
=== Eastern Conference semifinals ===
==== (1) Boston Celtics vs. (4) Washington Wizards ====
ABC

April 30
1:00 PM

Boxscore

Washington Wizards 111, Boston Celtics 123
Scoring by quarter: 38–24, 26–35, 16–36, 31–28
Pts: Bradley Beal 27; Rebs: Marcin Gortat 13; Asts: John Wall 16	Pts: Isaiah Thomas 33; Rebs: Al Horford 9 Asts: Al Horford 10
Boston leads series, 1–0

TD Garden, Boston, Massachusetts
Attendance: 18,624
Referees: Scott Foster, Courtney Kirkland, Zach Zarba

TNT

May 2
8:00 PM

Boxscore

Washington Wizards 119, Boston Celtics 129 (OT)
Scoring by quarter: 42–29, 25–35, 22–20, 25–30, Overtime: 5–15
Pts: John Wall 40; Rebs: Marcin Gortat 10; Asts: John Wall 13	Pts: Isaiah Thomas 53; Rebs: Al Horford 12; Asts: Marcus Smart 5
Boston leads series, 2–0

TD Garden, Boston, Massachusetts
Attendance: 18,624
Referees: Marc Davis, Rodney Mott, Tom Washington

ESPN

May 4
8:00 PM

Boxscore

Boston Celtics 89, Washington Wizards 116
Scoring by quarter: 17–39, 23–24, 29–32, 20–21
Pts: Al Horford 16; Rebs: Jae Crowder 7 Asts: Isaiah Thomas 4	Pts: John Wall 24; Rebs: Marcin Gortat 16; Asts: John Wall 8
Boston leads series, 2–1

Verizon Center, Washington, D.C.
Attendance: 20,356
Referees: Monty McCutchen, Tony Brown, James Capers

TNT

May 7
6:30 PM

Boxscore

Boston Celtics 102, Washington Wizards 121
Scoring by quarter: 24–20, 24–28, 20–42, 34–31
Pts: Isaiah Thomas 19; Rebs: Crowder, Rozier 7 each Asts: Marcus Smart 6	Pts: Bradley Beal 29; Rebs: Markieff Morris 10; Asts: John Wall 12
Series tied, 2–2

Verizon Center, Washington, D.C.
Attendance: 20,356
Referees: Danny Crawford, Sean Corbin, Ron Garretson

TNT

May 10
8:00 PM

Boxscore

Washington Wizards 101, Boston Celtics 123
Scoring by quarter: 21–33, 30–34, 25–26, 25–30
Pts: John Wall 21; Rebs: Marcin Gortat 11; Asts: three players 4 each	Pts: Avery Bradley 29; Rebs: Marcus Smart 11; Asts: Isaiah Thomas 9
Boston leads series, 3–2

TD Garden, Boston, Massachusetts
Attendance: 18,624
Referees: Mike Callahan, Ed Malloy, Sean Wright

ESPN

May 12
8:00 PM

Boxscore

Boston Celtics 91, Washington Wizards 92
Scoring by quarter: 17–22, 25–19, 27–25, 22–26
Pts: Bradley, Thomas 27 each Rebs: Kelly Olynyk 8 Asts: Jae Crowder 8	Pts: Bradley Beal 33; Rebs: Marcin Gortat 13; Asts: John Wall 8
Series tied, 3–3

Verizon Center, Washington, D.C.
Attendance: 20,356
Referees: Ken Mauer, Tony Brothers, John Goble

- In Game 6, John Wall hit the game-winning 3-pointer with 3.5 seconds left.

TNT

May 15
8:00 PM

Boxscore

Washington Wizards 105, Boston Celtics 115
Scoring by quarter: 23–27, 32–26, 24–32, 26–30
Pts: Bradley Beal 38; Rebs: Marcin Gortat 11; Asts: John Wall 11	Pts: Isaiah Thomas 29; Rebs: Horford, Smart 6 each Asts: Isaiah Thomas 12
Boston wins series, 4–3

TD Garden, Boston, Massachusetts
Attendance: 18,624
Referees: Monty McCutchen, Derrick Stafford, Zach Zarba

Regular-season series
Tied 2–2 in the regular-season series

November 9, 2016

Recap

Boston Celtics 93, Washington Wizards 118

Verizon Center, Washington, D.C.

January 11, 2017

Recap

Washington Wizards 108, Boston Celtics 117

TD Garden, Boston, Massachusetts

January 24, 2017

Recap

Boston Celtics 108, Washington Wizards 123

Verizon Center, Washington, D.C.

March 20, 2017

Recap

Washington Wizards 102, Boston Celtics 110

TD Garden, Boston, Massachusetts

This was the fourth playoff meeting between these two teams, with the Celtics winning two of the first three meetings. Memorably, during the first quarter of Game 1, Isaiah Thomas was struck in the mouth by Otto Porter's elbow, immediately knocking out one tooth, and causing further damage. As Porter prepared to shoot a pair of free throws, Thomas calmly retrieved and pocketed his fallen tooth, then hit two three-point field goals in the following two minutes, before being pulled from the game for medical attention. Thomas went on to play the entire seven-game series, including a 53-point effort to lead his team to an overtime victory in Game 2, all while wearing temporary protection in his mouth. He underwent extensive oral surgery after the playoffs to mitigate the damage.

Previous playoff series
Boston leads 2–1 in all-time playoff series

1975

Boston Celtics 2, Washington Bullets 4

1975 Eastern Conference Finals

1982

Boston Celtics 4, Washington Bullets 1

1982 Eastern Conference Semifinals

1984

Boston Celtics 3, Washington Bullets 1

1984 Eastern Conference First Round

==== (2) Cleveland Cavaliers vs. (3) Toronto Raptors ====
TNT, TSN

May 1
7:00 PM

Boxscore

Toronto Raptors 105, Cleveland Cavaliers 116
Scoring by quarter: 18–30, 30–32, 26–34, 31–20
Pts: Kyle Lowry 20; Rebs: P. J. Tucker 11; Asts: Kyle Lowry 11	Pts: LeBron James 35; Rebs: Tristan Thompson 14; Asts: Kyrie Irving 10
Cleveland leads series, 1–0

Quicken Loans Arena, Cleveland, Ohio
Attendance: 20,562
Referees: Monty McCutchen, Eric Lewis, Derrick Stafford

TNT, SN1

May 3
7:00 PM

Boxscore

Toronto Raptors 103, Cleveland Cavaliers 125
Scoring by quarter: 22–34, 26–28, 25–37, 30–26
Pts: Jonas Valančiūnas 23; Rebs: Cory Joseph 6 Asts: Kyle Lowry 5	Pts: LeBron James 39; Rebs: Tristan Thompson 9 Asts: Kyrie Irving 11
Cleveland leads series, 2–0

Quicken Loans Arena, Cleveland, Ohio
Attendance: 20,562
Referees: Danny Crawford, Sean Corbin, Sean Wright

ESPN, SN1

May 5
7:00 PM

Boxscore

Cleveland Cavaliers 115, Toronto Raptors 94
Scoring by quarter: 28–24, 21–28, 30–25, 36–17
Pts: LeBron James 35; Rebs: Kevin Love 13; Asts: LeBron James 7	Pts: DeMar DeRozan 37; Rebs: Jonas Valančiūnas 8 Asts: Cory Joseph 6
Cleveland leads series, 3–0

Air Canada Centre, Toronto, Ontario
Attendance: 20,384
Referees: Mike Callahan, Kane Fitzgerald, Bill Kennedy

ABC, TSN

May 7
3:30 PM

Boxscore

Cleveland Cavaliers 109, Toronto Raptors 102
Scoring by quarter: 28–28, 33–21, 24–31, 24–22
Pts: LeBron James 35; Rebs: LeBron James 9 Asts: Kyrie Irving 9	Pts: Serge Ibaka 23; Rebs: P. J. Tucker 12; Asts: Cory Joseph 12
Cleveland wins series, 4–0

Air Canada Centre, Toronto, Ontario
Attendance: 20,307
Referees: Scott Foster, Tony Brothers, Pat Fraher

Regular-season series
Cleveland won 3–1 in the regular-season series

October 28, 2016

Recap

Cleveland Cavaliers 94, Toronto Raptors 91

Air Canada Centre, Toronto, Ontario

November 15, 2016

Recap

Toronto Raptors 117, Cleveland Cavaliers 121

Quicken Loans Arena, Cleveland, Ohio

December 5, 2016

Recap

Cleveland Cavaliers 116, Toronto Raptors 112

Air Canada Centre, Toronto, Ontario

April 12, 2017

Recap

Toronto Raptors 98, Cleveland Cavaliers 83

Quicken Loans Arena, Cleveland, Ohio

This was the second playoff meeting between these two teams, with Cleveland winning the first meeting in 2016.

Previous playoffs series
Cleveland leads 1–0 in all-time playoff series

2016

Toronto Raptors 2, Cleveland Cavaliers 4

2016 Eastern Conference Finals

=== Western Conference semifinals ===
==== (1) Golden State Warriors vs. (5) Utah Jazz ====
TNT

May 2
10:30 PM

Boxscore

Utah Jazz 94, Golden State Warriors 106
Scoring by quarter: 21–27, 25–31, 27–26, 21–22
Pts: Rudy Gobert 13; Rebs: Rudy Gobert 13; Asts: three players 4 each	Pts: Stephen Curry 22; Rebs: Draymond Green 8 Asts: David West 7
Golden State leads series, 1–0

Oracle Arena, Oakland, California
Attendance: 19,596
Referees: Mike Callahan, John Goble, David Guthrie

ESPN

May 4
10:30 PM

Boxscore

Utah Jazz 104, Golden State Warriors 115
Scoring by quarter: 15–33, 32–27, 35–32, 22–23
Pts: Gordon Hayward 33; Rebs: Rudy Gobert 16; Asts: Hayward, Mack 4 each	Pts: Kevin Durant 25; Rebs: Kevin Durant 11; Asts: Curry, Durant 7 each
Golden State leads series, 2–0

Oracle Arena, Oakland, California
Attendance: 19,596
Referees: Derrick Stafford, Derrick Collins, Zach Zarba

ABC

May 6
8:30 PM

Boxscore

Golden State Warriors 102, Utah Jazz 91
Scoring by quarter: 27–17, 22–33, 23–20, 30–21
Pts: Kevin Durant 38; Rebs: Kevin Durant 13; Asts: Draymond Green 5	Pts: Gordon Hayward 29; Rebs: Rudy Gobert 15; Asts: Gordon Hayward 6
Golden State leads series, 3–0

Vivint Smart Home Arena, Salt Lake City, Utah
Attendance: 19,911
Referees: Ken Mauer, Bennie Adams, Ed Malloy

TNT

May 8
9:00 PM

Boxscore

Golden State Warriors 121, Utah Jazz 95
Scoring by quarter: 39–17, 21–35, 33–27, 28–16
Pts: Stephen Curry 30; Rebs: Draymond Green 10; Asts: Draymond Green 11	Pts: Gordon Hayward 25; Rebs: Rudy Gobert 13; Asts: Hayward, Ingles 3 each
Golden State wins series, 4–0

Vivint Smart Home Arena, Salt Lake City, Utah
Attendance: 19,911
Referees: Monty McCutchen, James Capers, James Williams

- This was Gordon Hayward's last game in Utah as he joined the Boston Celtics during the following offseason.

Regular-season series
Golden State won 2–1 in the regular-season series

December 8, 2016

Recap

Golden State Warriors 106, Utah Jazz 99

Vivint Smart Home Arena, Salt Lake City, Utah

December 20, 2016

Recap

Utah Jazz 74, Golden State Warriors 104

Oracle Arena, Oakland, California

April 10, 2017

Recap

Utah Jazz 105, Golden State Warriors 99

Oracle Arena, Oakland, California

This was the fourth playoff meeting between these two teams, with the Warriors winning two of the first three meetings.

Previous playoff series
Golden State leads 2–1 in all-time playoff series

1987

Golden State Warriors 3, Utah Jazz 2

1987 Western Conference First Round

1989

Golden State Warriors 3, Utah Jazz 0

1989 Western Conference First Round

2007

Golden State Warriors 1, Utah Jazz 4

2007 Western Conference Semifinals

==== (2) San Antonio Spurs vs. (3) Houston Rockets ====
TNT

May 1
9:30 PM

Boxscore

Houston Rockets 126, San Antonio Spurs 99
Scoring by quarter: 34–23, 35–16, 27–28, 30–32
Pts: Trevor Ariza 23; Rebs: Clint Capela 13; Asts: James Harden 14	Pts: Kawhi Leonard 21; Rebs: Kawhi Leonard 11; Asts: Kawhi Leonard 6
Houston leads series, 1–0

AT&T Center, San Antonio, Texas
Attendance: 18,418
Referees: Ken Mauer, Ed Malloy, Josh Tiven

TNT

May 3
9:30 PM

Boxscore

Houston Rockets 96, San Antonio Spurs 121
Scoring by quarter: 30–33, 25–32, 28–23, 13–33
Pts: Ryan Anderson 18; Rebs: Ryan Anderson 8 Asts: James Harden 10	Pts: Kawhi Leonard 34; Rebs: Pau Gasol 13; Asts: Kawhi Leonard 8
Series tied, 1–1

AT&T Center, San Antonio, Texas
Attendance: 18,418
Referees: Scott Foster, Tony Brothers, Bill Spooner

ESPN

May 5
9:30 PM

Boxscore

San Antonio Spurs 103, Houston Rockets 92
Scoring by quarter: 19–21, 24–18, 29–27, 31–26
Pts: Aldridge, Leonard 26 each Rebs: Kawhi Leonard 10; Asts: Kawhi Leonard 7	Pts: James Harden 43; Rebs: Clint Capela 16; Asts: Ariza, Harden 5 each
San Antonio leads series, 2–1

Toyota Center, Houston, Texas
Attendance: 18,187
Referees: Danny Crawford, Marc Davis, Brian Forte

TNT

May 7
9:00 PM

Boxscore

San Antonio Spurs 104, Houston Rockets 125
Scoring by quarter: 22–34, 31–23, 23–34, 28–34
Pts: Jonathon Simmons 17; Rebs: Pau Gasol 7 Asts: Patty Mills 5	Pts: James Harden 28; Rebs: Clint Capela 9 Asts: James Harden 12
Series tied, 2–2

Toyota Center, Houston, Texas
Attendance: 18,055
Referees: Mike Callahan, John Goble, Sean Wright

TNT

May 9
8:00 PM

Boxscore

Houston Rockets 107, San Antonio Spurs 110 (OT)
Scoring by quarter: 29–32, 31–26, 25–28, 16–15, Overtime: 6–9
Pts: James Harden 33; Rebs: Capela, Harden 11 each Asts: James Harden 10	Pts: Kawhi Leonard 22; Rebs: Kawhi Leonard 15; Asts: Manu Ginóbili 5
San Antonio leads series, 3–2

AT&T Center, San Antonio, Texas
Attendance: 18,418
Referees: Derrick Stafford, Rodney Mott, Zach Zarba

- In Game 5, Manu Ginóbili blocked James Harden's game-tying 3-point attempt in overtime before the buzzer sounded.

ESPN

May 11
8:00 PM

Boxscore

San Antonio Spurs 114, Houston Rockets 75
Scoring by quarter: 31–24, 30–18, 26–22, 27–11
Pts: LaMarcus Aldridge 34; Rebs: LaMarcus Aldridge 12; Asts: Patty Mills 7	Pts: Trevor Ariza 20; Rebs: Clint Capela 12; Asts: James Harden 7
San Antonio wins series, 4–2

Toyota Center, Houston, Texas
Attendance: 18,055
Referees: Scott Foster, James Capers, Ron Garretson

Regular-season series
San Antonio won 3–1 in the regular-season series

November 9, 2016

Recap

Houston Rockets 101, San Antonio Spurs 99

AT&T Center, San Antonio, Texas

November 12, 2016

Recap

San Antonio Spurs 106, Houston Rockets 100

Toyota Center, Houston, Texas

December 20, 2016

Recap

San Antonio Spurs 102, Houston Rockets 100

Toyota Center, Houston, Texas

March 6, 2017

Recap

Houston Rockets 110, San Antonio Spurs 112

AT&T Center, San Antonio, Texas

This was the fourth playoff meeting between these two teams, with the Rockets winning the first three meetings.

Previous playoff series
Houston leads 3–0 in all-time playoff series

1980

Houston Rockets 2, San Antonio Spurs 1

1980 Eastern Conference First Round

1981

Houston Rockets 4, San Antonio Spurs 3

1981 Western Conference Semifinals

1995

Houston Rockets 4, San Antonio Spurs 2

1995 Western Conference Finals

== Conference finals ==
=== Eastern Conference finals ===
==== (1) Boston Celtics vs. (2) Cleveland Cavaliers ====
TNT

May 17
8:30 PM

Boxscore

Cleveland Cavaliers 117, Boston Celtics 104
Scoring by quarter: 30–19, 31–20, 31–36, 25–29
Pts: LeBron James 38; Rebs: Kevin Love 12; Asts: LeBron James 7	Pts: Bradley, Crowder 21 each Rebs: Jaylen Brown 9 Asts: Isaiah Thomas 10
Cleveland leads series, 1–0

TD Garden, Boston, Massachusetts
Attendance: 18,624
Referees: Mike Callahan, John Goble, Sean Wright

TNT

May 19
8:30 PM

Boxscore

Cleveland Cavaliers 130, Boston Celtics 86
Scoring by quarter: 32–18, 40–13, 31–28, 27–27
Pts: LeBron James 30; Rebs: Kevin Love 12; Asts: LeBron James 7	Pts: Jaylen Brown 19; Rebs: three players 5 each Asts: Marcus Smart 7
Cleveland leads series, 2–0

TD Garden, Boston, Massachusetts
Attendance: 18,624
Referees: Scott Foster, Tony Brothers, Ron Garretson

- This was Isaiah Thomas' last game in Boston as a hip injury would not allow him to dress for the remainder of the playoffs. He and teammate Jae Crowder would be traded to the Cavaliers during the following offseason.

TNT

May 21
8:00 PM

Boxscore

Boston Celtics 111, Cleveland Cavaliers 108
Scoring by quarter: 24–35, 26–31, 32–21, 29–21
Pts: Marcus Smart 27; Rebs: Jae Crowder 11; Asts: Marcus Smart 7	Pts: Kyrie Irving 29; Rebs: Tristan Thompson 13; Asts: Kyrie Irving 7
Cleveland leads series, 2–1

Quicken Loans Arena, Cleveland, Ohio
Attendance: 20,562
Referees: Danny Crawford, Marc Davis, David Guthrie

- In Game 3, Avery Bradley hit the game-winning three-pointer with 0.1 seconds left.

TNT

May 23
8:30 PM

Boxscore

Boston Celtics 99, Cleveland Cavaliers 112
Scoring by quarter: 29–19, 28–28, 23–40, 19–25
Pts: Avery Bradley 19; Rebs: Jae Crowder 8 Asts: Al Horford 7	Pts: Kyrie Irving 42; Rebs: Kevin Love 17; Asts: LeBron James 6
Cleveland leads series, 3–1

Quicken Loans Arena, Cleveland, Ohio
Attendance: 20,562
Referees: Monty McCutchen, Pat Fraher, Derrick Stafford

TNT

May 25
8:30 PM

Boxscore

Cleveland Cavaliers 135, Boston Celtics 102
Scoring by quarter: 43–27, 32–30, 34–17, 26–28
Pts: LeBron James 35; Rebs: Kevin Love 11; Asts: LeBron James 8	Pts: Avery Bradley 23; Rebs: Jae Crowder 6 Asts: Terry Rozier 7
Cleveland wins series, 4–1

TD Garden, Boston, Massachusetts
Attendance: 18,624
Referees: Ken Mauer, Kane Fitzgerald, Ed Malloy

Regular-season series
Cleveland won 3–1 in the regular-season series

November 3, 2016

Recap

Boston Celtics 122, Cleveland Cavaliers 128

Quicken Loans Arena, Cleveland, Ohio

December 29, 2016

Recap

Boston Celtics 118, Cleveland Cavaliers 124

Quicken Loans Arena, Cleveland, Ohio

March 1, 2017

Recap

Cleveland Cavaliers 99, Boston Celtics 103

TD Garden, Boston, Massachusetts

April 5, 2017

Recap

Cleveland Cavaliers 114, Boston Celtics 91

TD Garden, Boston, Massachusetts

This was the seventh playoff meeting between these two teams, with the Celtics winning four of the first six meetings.

Previous playoff series
Boston leads 4–2 in all-time playoff series

1976

Boston Celtics 4, Cleveland Cavaliers 2

1976 Eastern Conference Finals

1985

Boston Celtics 3, Cleveland Cavaliers 1

1985 Eastern Conference First Round

1992

Cleveland Cavaliers 4, Boston Celtics 3

1992 Eastern Conference Semifinals

2008

Boston Celtics 4, Cleveland Cavaliers 3

2008 Eastern Conference Semifinals

2010

Cleveland Cavaliers 2, Boston Celtics 4

2010 Eastern Conference Semifinals

2015

Cleveland Cavaliers 4, Boston Celtics 0

2015 Eastern Conference First Round

=== Western Conference finals ===
==== (1) Golden State Warriors vs. (2) San Antonio Spurs ====
ABC

May 14
3:30 PM

Boxscore

San Antonio Spurs 111, Golden State Warriors 113
Scoring by quarter: 30–16, 32–26, 28–39, 21–32
Pts: LaMarcus Aldridge 28; Rebs: Aldridge, Leonard 8 each Asts: three players 3 each	Pts: Stephen Curry 40; Rebs: Zaza Pachulia 9 Asts: Draymond Green 7
Golden State leads series, 1–0

Oracle Arena, Oakland, California
Attendance: 19,596
Referees: Danny Crawford, Marc Davis, Tom Washington

ESPN

May 16
9:00 PM

Boxscore

San Antonio Spurs 100, Golden State Warriors 136
Scoring by quarter: 16–33, 28–39, 31–34, 25–30
Pts: Jonathon Simmons 22; Rebs: Dewayne Dedmon 9 Asts: Dejounte Murray 6	Pts: Stephen Curry 29; Rebs: Draymond Green 9 Asts: Stephen Curry 7
Golden State leads series, 2–0

Oracle Arena, Oakland, California
Attendance: 19,596
Referees: Ken Mauer, Kane Fitzgerald, Ed Malloy

ESPN

May 20
9:00 PM

Boxscore

Golden State Warriors 120, San Antonio Spurs 108
Scoring by quarter: 29–33, 35–22, 36–33, 20–20
Pts: Kevin Durant 33; Rebs: Kevin Durant 10; Asts: Draymond Green 7	Pts: Manu Ginóbili 21; Rebs: Pau Gasol 10; Asts: Patty Mills 6
Golden State leads series, 3–0

AT&T Center, San Antonio, Texas
Attendance: 18,792
Referees: Monty McCutchen, James Capers, Bill Kennedy

ESPN

May 22
9:00 PM

Boxscore

Golden State Warriors 129, San Antonio Spurs 115
Scoring by quarter: 31–19, 34–32, 31–27, 33–37
Pts: Stephen Curry 36; Rebs: Kevin Durant 12; Asts: Draymond Green 8	Pts: Kyle Anderson 20; Rebs: Pau Gasol 9 Asts: Ginóbili, Murray 7 each
Golden State wins series, 4–0

AT&T Center, San Antonio, Texas
Attendance: 18,466
Referees: Mike Callahan, Sean Corbin, Zach Zarba

Regular-season series
San Antonio won 2–1 in the regular-season series

October 25, 2016

Recap

San Antonio Spurs 129, Golden State Warriors 100

Oracle Arena, Oakland, California

March 11, 2017

Recap

Golden State Warriors 85, San Antonio Spurs 107

AT&T Center, San Antonio, Texas

March 29, 2017

Recap

Golden State Warriors 110, San Antonio Spurs 98

AT&T Center, San Antonio, Texas

This was the third playoff meeting between these two teams, with each team winning one series. San Antonio led by as many as 25 points in Game 1 before Kawhi Leonard had to leave the game and the series after he landed on Zaza Pachulia's foot, re-aggravating his existing ankle injury.

Previous playoff series
Tied 1–1 in all-time playoff series

1991

Golden State Warriors 3, San Antonio Spurs 1

1991 Western Conference First Round

2013

Golden State Warriors 2, San Antonio Spurs 4

2013 Western Conference Semifinals

== 2017 NBA Finals: (E2) Cleveland Cavaliers vs. (W1) Golden State Warriors ==
ABC

June 1
9:00 PM

Boxscore

Cleveland Cavaliers 91, Golden State Warriors 113
Scoring by quarter: 30–35, 22–25, 20–33, 19–20
Pts: LeBron James 28; Rebs: Kevin Love 21; Asts: LeBron James 8	Pts: Kevin Durant 38; Rebs: Draymond Green 11; Asts: Stephen Curry 10
Golden State leads series, 1–0

Oracle Arena, Oakland, California
Attendance: 19,596
Referees: Danny Crawford, Derrick Stafford, Zach Zarba

ABC

June 4
8:00 PM

Boxscore

Cleveland Cavaliers 113, Golden State Warriors 132
Scoring by quarter: 34–40, 30–27, 24–35, 25–30
Pts: LeBron James 29; Rebs: LeBron James 11; Asts: LeBron James 14	Pts: Kevin Durant 33; Rebs: Kevin Durant 13; Asts: Stephen Curry 11
Golden State leads series, 2–0

Oracle Arena, Oakland, California
Attendance: 19,596
Referees: Scott Foster, Tony Brothers, James Capers

ABC

June 7
9:00 PM

Boxscore

Golden State Warriors 118, Cleveland Cavaliers 113
Scoring by quarter: 39–32, 28–29, 22–33, 29–19
Pts: Kevin Durant 31; Rebs: Stephen Curry 13; Asts: Draymond Green 7	Pts: LeBron James 39; Rebs: Kevin Love 13; Asts: LeBron James 9
Golden State leads series, 3–0

Quicken Loans Arena, Cleveland, Ohio
Attendance: 20,562
Referees: Monty McCutchen, Ed Malloy, Ken Mauer

ABC

June 9
9:00 PM

Boxscore

Golden State Warriors 116, Cleveland Cavaliers 137
Scoring by quarter: 33–49, 35–37, 28–29, 20–22
Pts: Kevin Durant 35; Rebs: Draymond Green 14; Asts: Stephen Curry 10	Pts: Kyrie Irving 40; Rebs: James, Thompson 10 each Asts: LeBron James 11
Golden State leads series, 3–1

Quicken Loans Arena, Cleveland, Ohio
Attendance: 20,562
Referees: Mike Callahan, Marc Davis, John Goble

ABC

June 12
9:00 PM

Boxscore

Cleveland Cavaliers 120, Golden State Warriors 129
Scoring by quarter: 37–33, 23–38, 33–27, 27–31
Pts: LeBron James 41; Rebs: LeBron James 13; Asts: LeBron James 8	Pts: Kevin Durant 39; Rebs: Draymond Green 12; Asts: Stephen Curry 10
Golden State wins series, 4–1

Oracle Arena, Oakland, California
Attendance: 19,596
Referees: Danny Crawford, Ed Malloy, Derrick Stafford

Regular-season series
Tied 1–1 in the regular-season series

December 25, 2016

Recap

Golden State Warriors 108, Cleveland Cavaliers 109

Quicken Loans Arena, Cleveland, Ohio

January 16, 2017

Recap

Cleveland Cavaliers 91, Golden State Warriors 126

Oracle Arena, Oakland, California

This was the third meeting in the NBA Finals between the Warriors and Cavaliers with each team winning one series.

Previous playoff series
Teams tied 1–1 in all-time playoff series

2015

Golden State Warriors 4, Cleveland Cavaliers 2

2015 NBA Finals

2016

Golden State Warriors 3, Cleveland Cavaliers 4

2016 NBA Finals

== Statistical leaders ==
Category	Game high			Average			
Category	Player	Team	High	Player	Team	Avg.	GP
Points	Isaiah Thomas	Boston Celtics	53	Russell Westbrook	Oklahoma City Thunder	37.4	5
Rebounds	Kevin Love	Cleveland Cavaliers	21	DeAndre Jordan	Los Angeles Clippers	14.4	7
Assists	John Wall	Washington Wizards	16	Russell Westbrook	Oklahoma City Thunder	10.8	5
Steals	Thaddeus Young; Kawhi Leonard; Stephen Curry; Kevin Love	Indiana Pacers; San Antonio Spurs; Golden State Warriors; Cleveland Cavaliers	6	Russell Westbrook; André Roberson	Oklahoma City Thunder	2.40	5
Blocks	Draymond Green	Golden State Warriors	6	André Roberson	Oklahoma City Thunder	3.40	5

== Media coverage ==
=== Television ===
ESPN, TNT, ABC, ESPN2, and NBA TV broadcast the playoffs nationally in the United States. In the first round, regional sports networks affiliated with the teams could also broadcast the games, except for games televised on ABC. Throughout the first two rounds, TNT televised games Saturday through Thursday, ESPN televised games Friday and Saturday, and ABC televised selected games on Saturday and Sunday, usually in the afternoon. NBA TV and ESPN2 aired select weekday games in the first round. TNT televised the Eastern Conference Finals. Game 1 of the Western Conference Finals was televised on ABC, while Games 2 through 4 were televised on ESPN. ABC had exclusive television rights to the NBA Finals for the 15th consecutive year.
