= Homecoming with Rick Reilly =

- Starring: Rick Reilly
- Country of origin: United States
- No. of episodes: 16

Production
- Running time: 60 minutes (with commercials)

Original release
- Network: ESPN (2009-2010)
- Release: April 22, 2009 – December 14, 2010

Homecoming with Rick Reilly is an American television show on the sports network ESPN. The show is hosted by ESPN personality Rick Reilly, and features interviews with popular American sports figures.

== Interview subjects ==
- Josh Hamilton
- Jerry Rice
- Kurt Warner
- Tony Hawk
- John Elway
- Joe Mauer
- Michael Phelps
- Alonzo Mourning
- Chris Paul
- Dwyane Wade
- Landon Donovan
- Emmitt Smith
- Donovan McNabb (aired September 14, 2010)
- Earvin "Magic" Johnson, Jr. (air date December 14, 2010)
