= Jake Mauer =

American baseball player (born 1978)

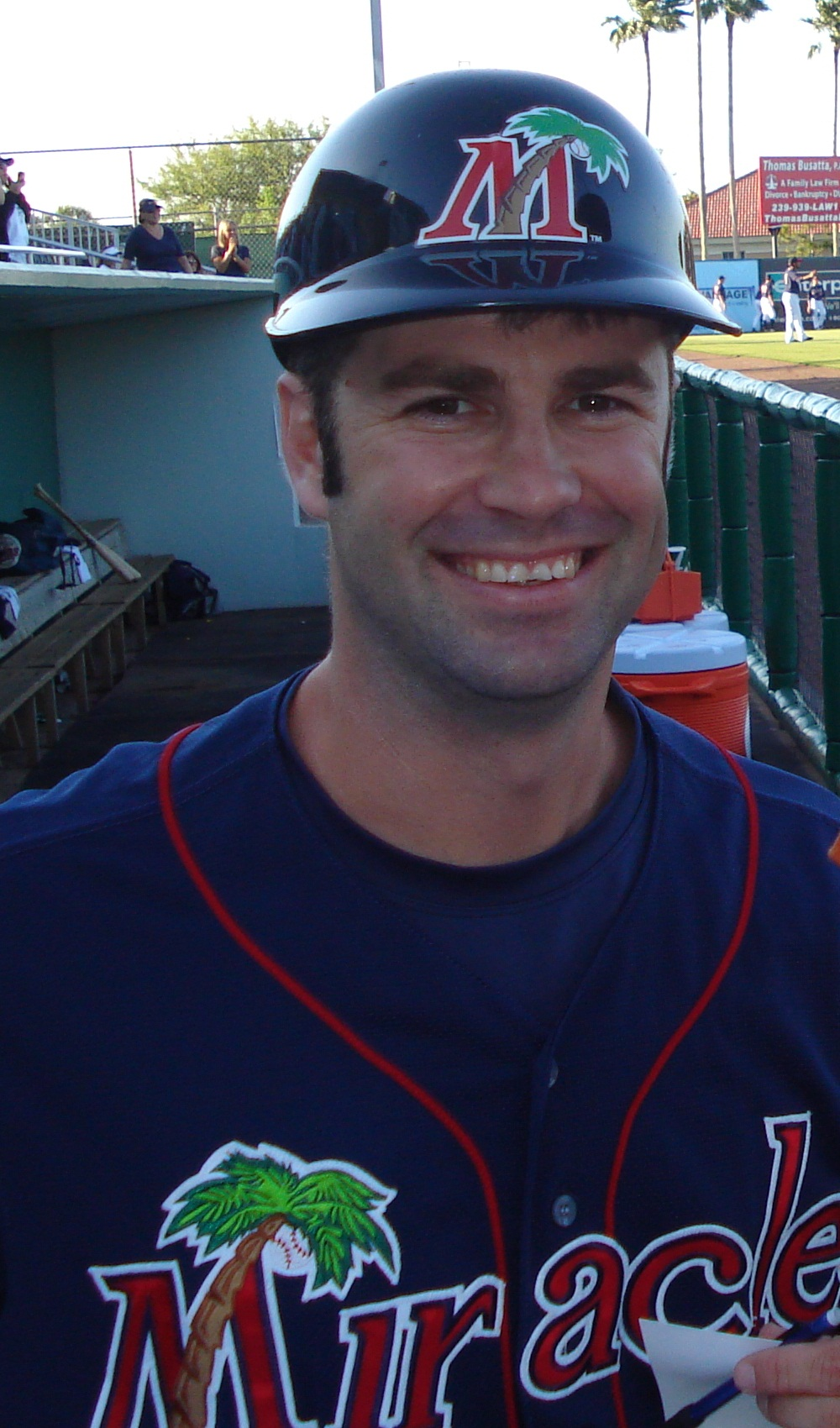
- Infielder
- Born: December 20, 1978 (age 47); St. Paul, Minnesota, U.S.
- Bats: Right Throws: Right
- Stats at Baseball Reference

Donald Charles "Jake" Mauer (born December 20, 1978) is an American former Minor League Baseball player, and former NCAA Division III baseball standout. He is a coach in the Minnesota Twins system. As a senior in 2001, he set the University of St. Thomas season record for hits with 83, and is the school's career leader in hits (243), runs (181) & games (187). He was inducted into the St. Thomas Athletic Hall of Fame in 2007. He is the older brother of Hall of Fame catcher Joe Mauer.

== Playing career ==
Mauer was selected by the Minnesota Twins in the 23rd round (677th overall pick) of the 2001 Major League Baseball draft, the same draft in which they selected his younger brother, Joe Mauer (who would go on to have a 15-year career with the team before being elected to the Baseball Hall of Fame in 2024), with the first overall pick. In five seasons in the Twins' farm system, Mauer compiled a .256 batting average with 82 runs batted in and no home runs.

== Managing career ==
After an elbow injury forced Mauer to retire following the 2005 season, he accepted a job as a Minor League coach with the Twins, and in 2008, was promoted to manager of the Gulf Coast League Twins. In Mauer's two seasons at the helm, the GCL Twins went 69-42, finishing in second and first, respectively, in the Gulf Coast League's Southern division. On October 21, 2009, he was named manager of the Fort Myers Miracle following Jeff Smith's promotion to the double A New Britain Rock Cats. Mauer's success in the Gulf Coast League did not carry over to the Florida State League, as he led the team to a 64-74 record his first season at the helm, its worst record since finishing 61-74 in 2004. Following the Twins' agreement to add the Cedar Rapids Kernels as the team's Low-A affiliate in November 2012, Mauer was named the team's manager. After four seasons, he advanced to the Chattanooga Lookouts, their Southern League team for 2017.

== Personal life ==
The Mauers have a third brother, Billy, who signed with the Twins as an undrafted free agent in 2003, and pitched in the organization for three seasons before chronic shoulder problems forced him to retire from the game. He ended his minor league career with a 3-4 record and 3.66 earned run average in 43 games. Their cousin is NBA referee Ken Mauer.

Jake resides in Shoreview, Minnesota with his wife, Rachel, and three children.

== Honors ==
- Cretin-Derham Hall High School Raiders Minnesota State Champion (1996 & 1997)
- NCAA Division III 3rd team All-American (2000)
- NCAA Division III 2nd team All-America (2001)
- Division III College World Series All-Tournament team (2000 & 2001)
- Minnesota Intercollegiate Athletic Conference (MIAC) co-Player of the Year (2001)
- St. Thomas Athletic Hall of Fame (2007)
- Gulf Coast League Manager of the Year (2009)
