= Joe Mauer =

American baseball player (born 1983)

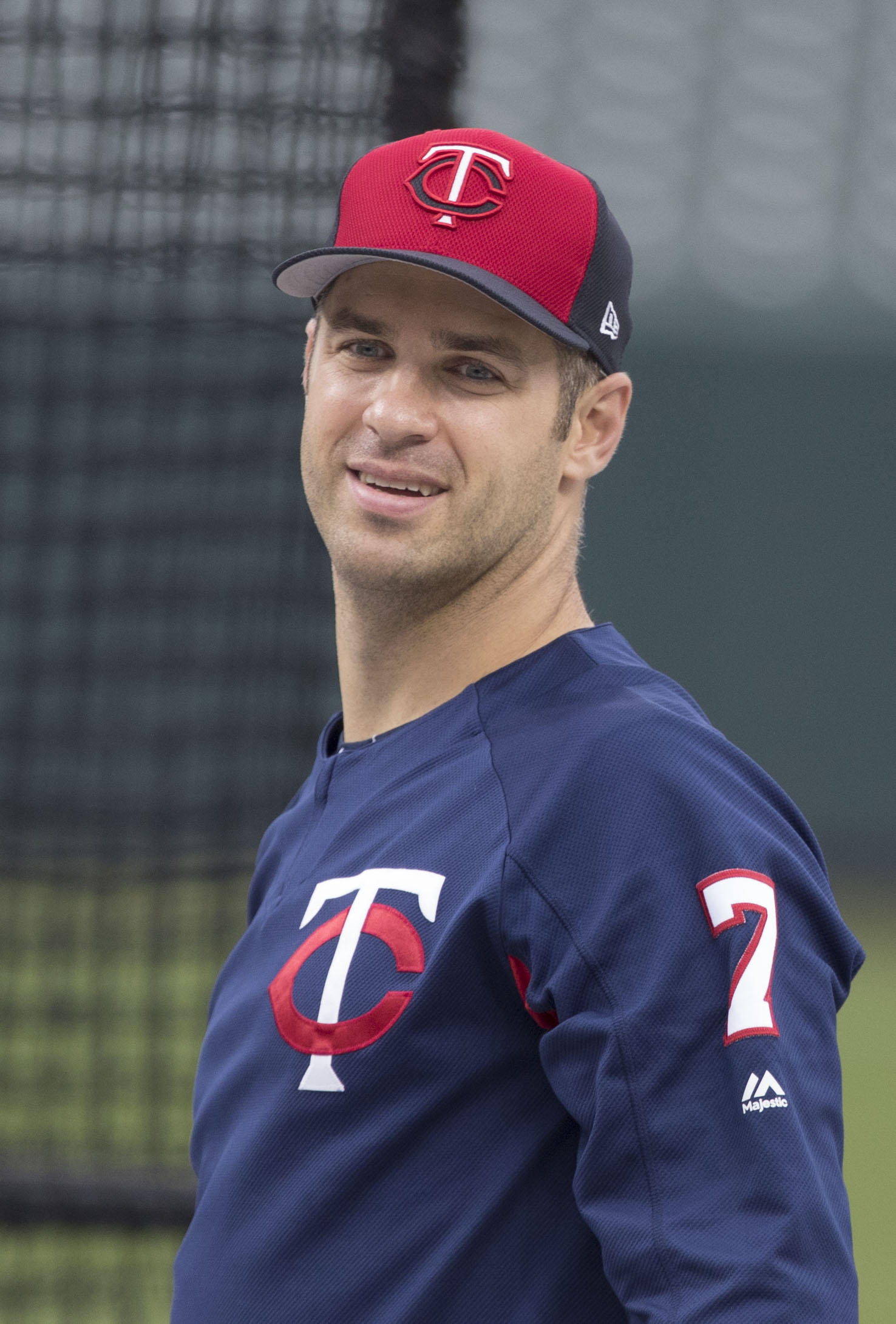
- Mauer with the Minnesota Twins in 2017
- Catcher / First baseman
- Born: April 19, 1983 (age 43); Saint Paul, Minnesota, U.S.
- Batted: Left Threw: Right

MLB debut
- April 5, 2004, for the Minnesota Twins

Last MLB appearance
- September 30, 2018, for the Minnesota Twins

MLB statistics
- Batting average: .306
- Hits: 2,123
- Home runs: 143
- Runs batted in: 923
- Stats at Baseball Reference

Teams
- Minnesota Twins (2004–2018)

Career highlights and awards
- 6× All-Star (2006, 2008–2010, 2012, 2013); AL MVP (2009); 3× Gold Glove Award (2008–2010); 5× Silver Slugger Award (2006, 2008–2010, 2013); 3× AL batting champion (2006, 2008, 2009); Minnesota Twins No. 7 retired; Minnesota Twins Hall of Fame

Member of the National

Baseball Hall of Fame
- Induction: 2024
- Vote: 76.1% (first ballot)
Medals
Men's baseball
Representing United States
World Junior Baseball Championship
Gold medal – first place	1999 Kaohsiung	Team
Silver medal – second place	2000 Edmonton	Team

Joseph Patrick Mauer (born April 19, 1983) is an American former professional baseball catcher and first baseman who spent his entire 15-year Major League Baseball (MLB) career with the Minnesota Twins. Regarded as one of the greatest contact hitters at the catcher position in his prime, Mauer is the only catcher in MLB history to win three batting titles, and the only catcher to ever win a batting title in the American League (AL). Internationally, Mauer represented the United States.

Selected by the Twins with the first overall pick of the 2001 MLB draft, Mauer received six All-Star selections, won three consecutive Gold Glove Awards (2008–2010), five Silver Slugger Awards (including three in a row), and the 2009 AL Most Valuable Player (MVP) Award. As of 2025, he is the most recent catcher to win the MVP award in the American League, and one of only two catchers to win an MVP in the 21st century, along with Buster Posey. In 2024, Mauer was inducted into both the Baseball Hall of Fame in his first year of eligibility and the National High School Hall of Fame.

== High school career ==
Mauer played football, basketball, and baseball for St. Paul's Cretin-Derham Hall Raiders. In his senior year, he became the only athlete ever to be selected as the USA Today High School Player of the Year in football (quarterback, 2000) and baseball (catcher, 2001).

In December 2009, Sports Illustrated magazine included Mauer in its article on ten "signature" moments in U.S. high school sports in the 2000–2009 decade, referring to his selection by the Minnesota Twins as the first pick in the 2001 Major League Baseball draft.

=== Baseball ===
Mauer attended the same high school as Baseball Hall of Famer and former Milwaukee Brewer Paul Molitor, who later became his major league manager with the Twins. Molitor has said that Mauer "has the best swing he had ever seen". Jim O'Neill, Mauer's baseball coach at Cretin-Derham Hall, said his former student "has been groomed for this job since he was a little boy. Mauer's dad, Jake, created a contraption for Joe he later named the 'Quickswing.' The device dropped balls down a tube from eye level and released them at waist level." Mauer had been asked to leave his T-ball league at the age of four, because he was hitting the ball too hard for the other players. "Another guy that came from Cretin-Derham Hall, Paul Molitor, was very similar, [and] had a good short swing," O'Neill said. "And they're both able to wait on the ball so long because they don't have the big swing. Like anything, you keep simple and keep it small or short, there's not a lot of holes in it and not a lot of room for errors."

A stand-out in baseball, Mauer struck out only once during his four-year high school career (though he did strike out in the All-Star game his senior year which isn't included in his overall stats). He hit .605 during his senior season. Years later, Mauer laughingly told an interviewer: "I can remember the time I did strike out. It was junior year, and it was in the state tournament. I came back to the bench and everybody thought something was wrong with me." Mauer's high school batting average exceeded .500 every year. He also set a Minnesota high school record and tied the national preps mark by hitting a home run in seven consecutive games. Mauer caught for the Team USA Junior National team from 1998 to 2000 and hit .595 during his final year on the team. He was voted best hitter at the World Junior Baseball Championship in Canada in 2000. In 2001, Mauer was voted the United States District V Player of the Year.

=== Basketball ===
Mauer averaged more than 20 points a game as a point guard for Cretin-Derham Hall. He was also named to the All-State team during his final two years on Cretin-Derham's basketball team.

=== Football ===
Mauer had an accomplished high school football career. In 2000, he appeared in the Faces in the Crowd section in Sports Illustrated. During his senior season as the Raiders' quarterback, Mauer completed 178 of 269 passes (66% completion percentage), for 3,022 yards, 41 touchdowns and five interceptions. He finished his two-year career as a starter with 5,528 yards and 73 touchdowns, leading the Raiders to two consecutive Class 5A State Championship Game appearances and winning the title in 1999, the Raiders' first.

Mauer was honored as the 2001 Gatorade National Player of the Year, was named to the USA Today All-USA high school football team, was honored as USA Today's Player of the Year, was a Reebok/ESPN High School All-American, and was awarded Player of the Year for the game that would go on to be known as the U.S. Army All-American Bowl. Mauer was also named National High School Quarterback of the Year in 2000 by The National Quarterback Club.

== Professional career ==
=== Draft and minor leagues ===
After committing to play football at Florida State University, Mauer ultimately decided instead to enter the Major League Baseball draft. Mauer was selected by the Twins as the first overall pick of the 2001 draft, ahead of college pitcher Mark Prior, who was taken second overall by the Chicago Cubs. Mauer was part of the United States' roster at the 2003 All-Star Futures Game at U.S. Cellular Field before being promoted to the Twins' roster in 2004 after his predecessor, A. J. Pierzynski, was traded to the San Francisco Giants, in the 2003 offseason.

=== 2004–2005 ===
Mauer made his major league debut on April 5, 2004, and finished the game 2-for-3, hitting a single off Rafael Betancourt of the Cleveland Indians for his first major-league hit. A knee injury to his left medial meniscus on April 7, 2004, required surgery and sidelined Mauer for more than a month. After a rehabilitation stint with the Twins' Triple-A affiliate, the Rochester Red Wings, Mauer returned to the Twins' lineup in June. In July, pain and swelling in his knee forced an early end to Mauer's 2004 season. Following his injury-shortened 2004, Mauer signed a contract for under a million with the Twins on January 24, 2005. In 2005, Mauer returned to the Twins' lineup for his first full major league season, and batted .294 with 144 hits, nine home runs and 55 RBI in 131 games.

=== 2006–2008 ===
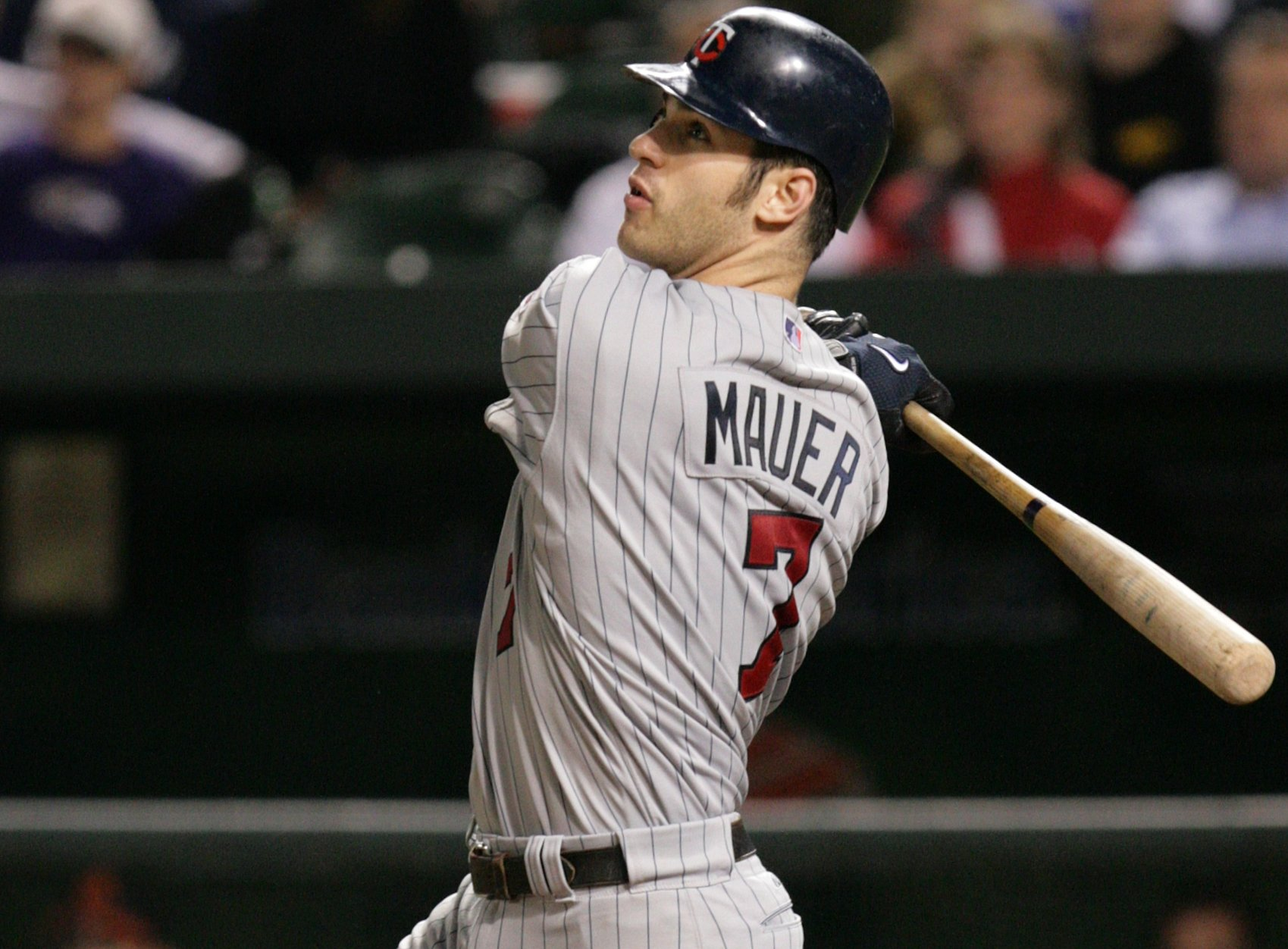
Mauer swings the bat during a game in September 2006

In his 2006 season, Mauer became the first catcher in American League history to lead the American League in batting average, finishing with an average of .347. Mauer's performance during the months of May and June garnered attention from the national media. He recorded a .528 batting average over the first ten days of June and hit .452 over the course of the month. He was also the first player since Mike Piazza in 1997 to reach base four or more times for five consecutive games. On June 12, Mauer was named the American League Player of the Week by Major League Baseball for his performance the week of June 4–11, during which he hit .625 (15-for-24) with five doubles, 4 RBI and two stolen bases.

Mauer recorded his first five RBI game June 26, against the Los Angeles Dodgers. Mauer followed that up with his first career five-hit game on June 27, also against the Los Angeles Dodgers. He was also named MLB Player of the Month for June after batting .452 with a .624 slugging percentage and .528 on-base percentage, 11 doubles, 14 RBI and 18 runs. Along with Johan Santana (Pitcher of the Month) and Francisco Liriano (Rookie of the Month), Mauer was part of the first-ever single-team sweep of MLB's three monthly awards. On July 2, Mauer was selected by the players to his first All-Star Game. Mauer appeared on the cover of the August 7, 2006 issue of Sports Illustrated.

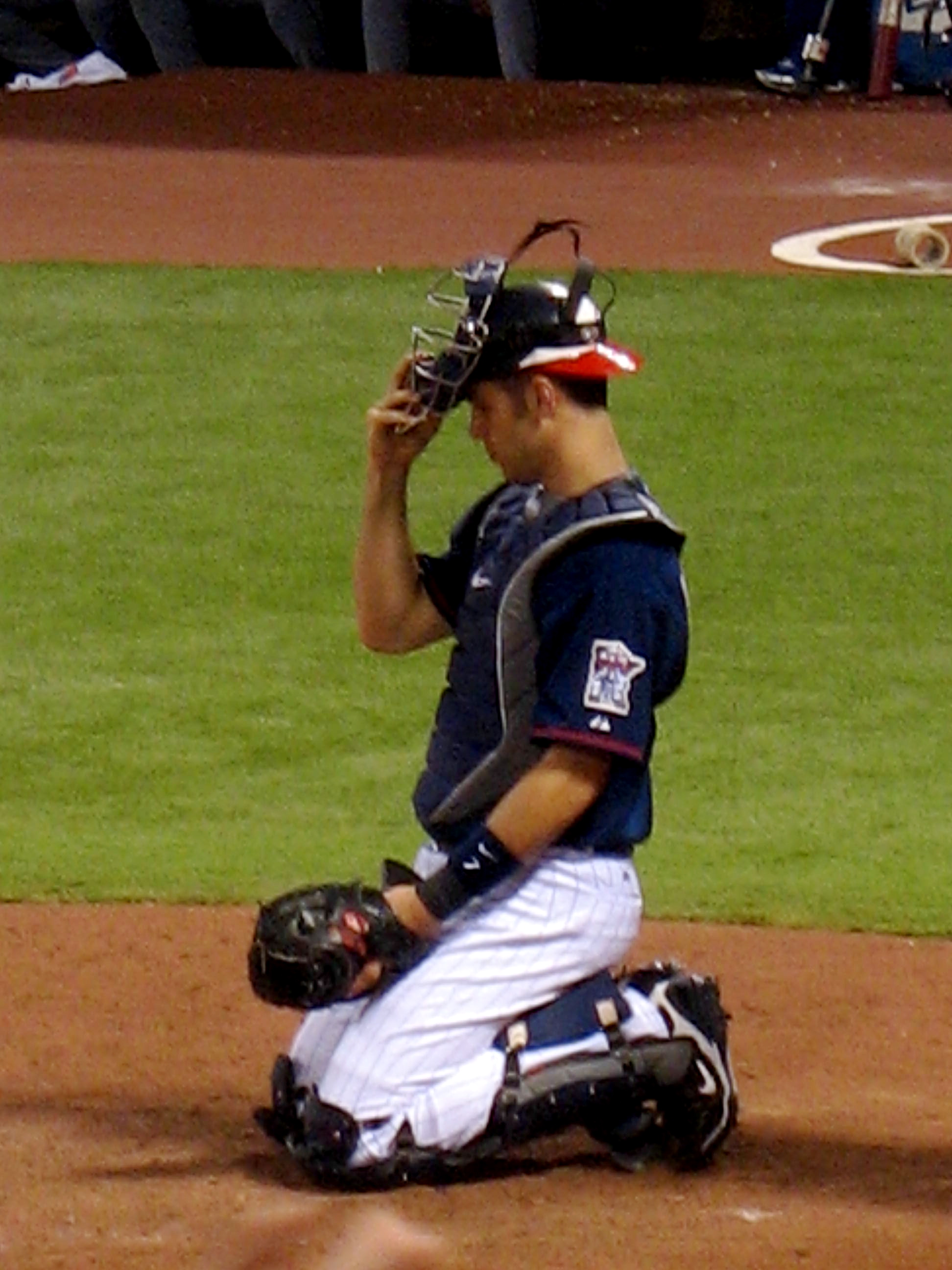
Mauer catching during the 2008 season

Mauer finished the 2006 regular season with a .347 batting average, edging the New York Yankees' Derek Jeter and Robinson Canó to win the American League batting title and become the first-ever American League catcher to win the crown and the first catcher to claim the title since Ernie Lombardi in 1942 with the Boston Braves. His .347 average was the highest in the Major Leagues, a feat not achieved by the previous three catchers to win NL batting titles. He was the youngest player to win a batting title since Alex Rodriguez in 1996. After going 2-for-4 in the last game of the 2006 regular season, Mauer confessed to reporters, "When I told you I wasn't thinking about the batting title? I was lying. I've never been that nervous in my life. I haven't felt anything like that since Opening Day as a rookie." Mauer won his first Silver Slugger Award in 2006, along with teammate Justin Morneau.

On February 11, 2007, Mauer agreed to a four-year, $34 million contract with the Twins to avoid arbitration. The deal ensured that Mauer would remain in Minnesota long enough to play in the Twins' Target Field in 2010. On July 21, Mauer hit his first career inside-the-park home run against Angels pitcher Scot Shields. It was his fifth home run of the season, and there were two players on base when he hit the homer. It was the first inside-the-park home run by a catcher since Kelly Stinnett did it for the Arizona Diamondbacks in 2005. Mauer finished the 2007 season batting .293 with seven home runs and 60 RBI in 109 games.

In 2008, Mauer became the first American League catcher to win the batting title twice when he led the AL with an average of .328. He also recorded nine home runs and 85 RBI in 146 games. On July 6, Mauer was announced as the starting catcher for the American League in the 2008 Major League Baseball All-Star Game. Mauer underwent surgery for kidney obstruction on December 22. Mauer won his first Gold Glove award in 2008, announced on November 6. He finished fourth in the balloting for American League Most Valuable Player, behind Dustin Pedroia, Justin Morneau, and Kevin Youkilis.

=== 2009: MVP season ===
In 2009, Mauer became the first catcher to lead the majors in batting average, on-base percentage, and slugging percentage in a single year, and the first player to lead the American League in all three since George Brett did so in 1980. Mauer's .365 average, which is the highest mark among catchers (with at least 3.1 plate appearances per game) since 1901, and the highest by a Twin since Rod Carew's .388 in 1977, led Major League Baseball. Mauer also won his second consecutive Gold Glove in 2009. Mauer was named the American League's 2009 MVP by a near-unanimous decision (27 out of 28 first place votes).

On March 11, Mauer was diagnosed with inflammation in the sacroiliac joint by team doctors following a magnetic resonance arthrogram. He was unable to take part in team workouts during spring training due to the pain in his lower back, which he first began experiencing late in the 2008 season. Mauer missed the start of the 2009 regular season and returned on May 1. He went 2-for-3 with an RBI and three runs scored in his first game back, hitting a home run on his first swing of the season.

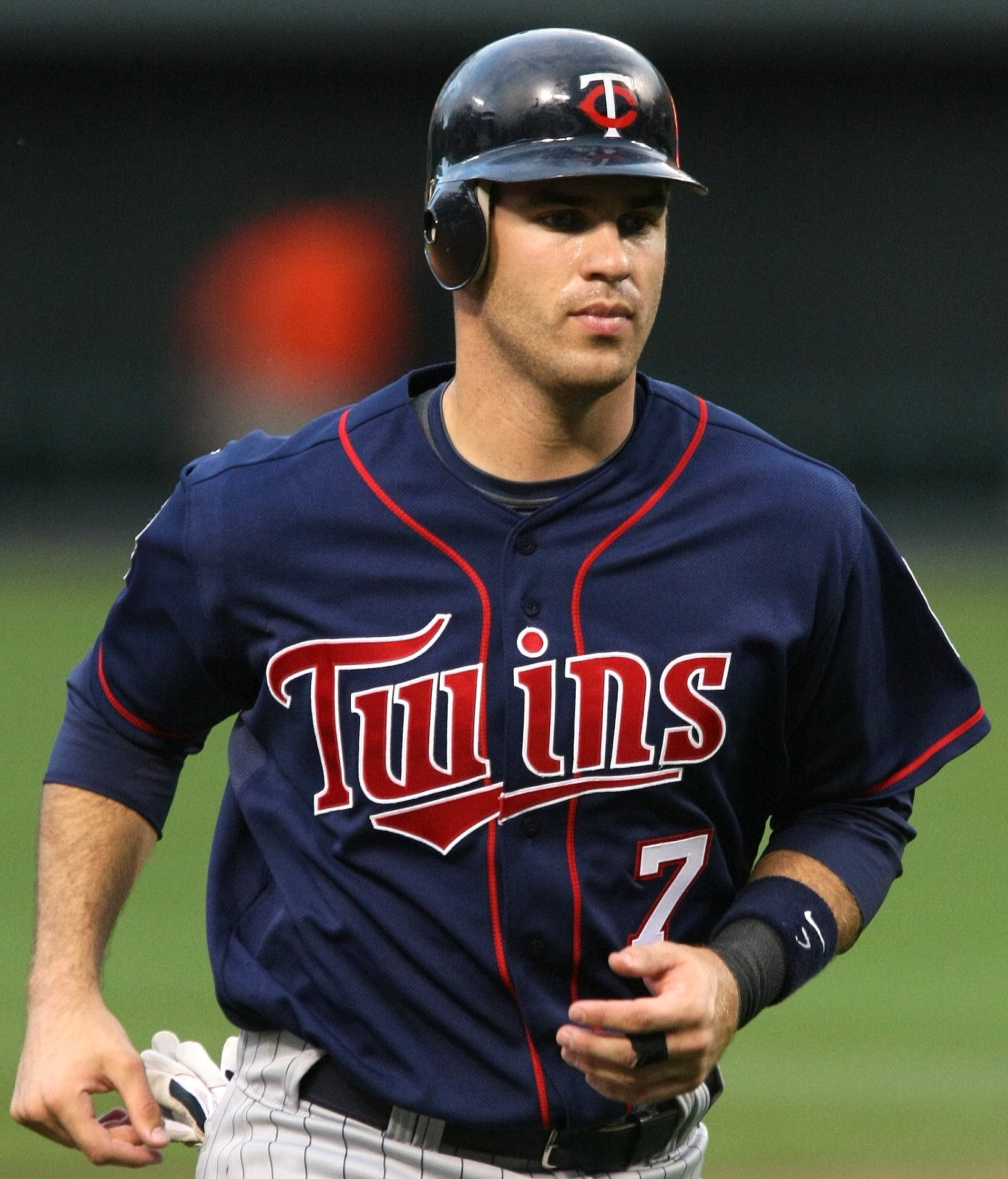
Mauer in 2009

After his return on May 1, Mauer had the best month of his career, batting .414 with 11 home runs and drove in 32 RBI in 28 May games, becoming the first-ever Twins player to reach that mark in a single month. During the week of May 18–24, Mauer led the major leagues in batting average at .458 (11-for-24), RBI with 13, and runs scored with 12, also hitting four home runs and accumulating 25 total bases. On May 26, he was named MLB Player of the Week for his performance. Through the month of May, Mauer led the major leagues in average at .414, on-base percentage at .500, and slugging percentage at .838, in addition to his home run and RBI totals, earning him his second Player of the Month Award honors. Mauer appeared on the cover of Sports Illustrated for a second time on June 24. An additional 25,000 copies of the magazine were sent to Minnesota for the occasion. He was selected to the 2009 MLB All-Star Game as the starting catcher and participated in the Home Run Derby, losing a tiebreaker to Albert Pujols in the first round.

The Twins trailed the Detroit Tigers by seven games in the American League Central division at the start of September, but rallied, winning 17 of their last 21 games to finish the season tied atop the division. On October 6, the Twins beat the Tigers 6–5 in Game 163, a 12-inning one-game playoff, to secure the division title. In 2009, Mauer led the American League in batting average (.365), on-base percentage (.444), slugging percentage (.587), and OPS (1.031), all of which were career-highs. Mauer became the first catcher to lead the league in all four offensive categories in a single season, and the first catcher to win three batting titles. At the time, he had won as many batting championships in a span of four years as all other Major League catchers in the history of baseball combined. Two National League catchers had won a total of three batting titles: Eugene "Bubbles" Hargrave in 1926, and Hall of Famer Ernie Lombardi in 1938 and 1942 (Buster Posey won his NL batting title in 2012). Mauer also established career-highs in hits (191), home runs (28), RBIs (96), extra-base hits (59), total bases (307), bWAR (7.8, including 7.7 oWAR), and fWAR (8.4), as well as near-personal bests in every other offensive category across 138 games.

Facing the Yankees in the ALDS, Mauer continued to swing the bat well, recording five hits in 12 at-bats plus two walks, but the Twins were swept by the eventual World Series champions in three games. On October 29, Baseball America named Mauer its 2009 Major League Player of the Year. On November 23, Mauer was named the 2009 American League Most Valuable Player by the Baseball Writers' Association of America over Yankees teammates Mark Teixeira and Derek Jeter, earning 27 of the 28 first-place votes. This made Mauer the second catcher in 33 years to win the AL MVP. He also received both a Gold Glove and Silver Slugger award for the second year in a row.

=== 2010–2012 ===
On March 21, 2010, Mauer agreed to an eight-year contract extension with the Twins worth $184 million which took effect in the 2011 and ran through the 2018 season. It was the richest contract paid to a catcher in the history of Major League Baseball. On July 26, 2010, Mauer hit a home run and drove in a career-high seven runs in the Twins' 19–1 win over the rival Kansas City Royals. He hit his 1,000th career Major League hit on September 14, 2010 against the Chicago White Sox at U.S. Cellular Field.

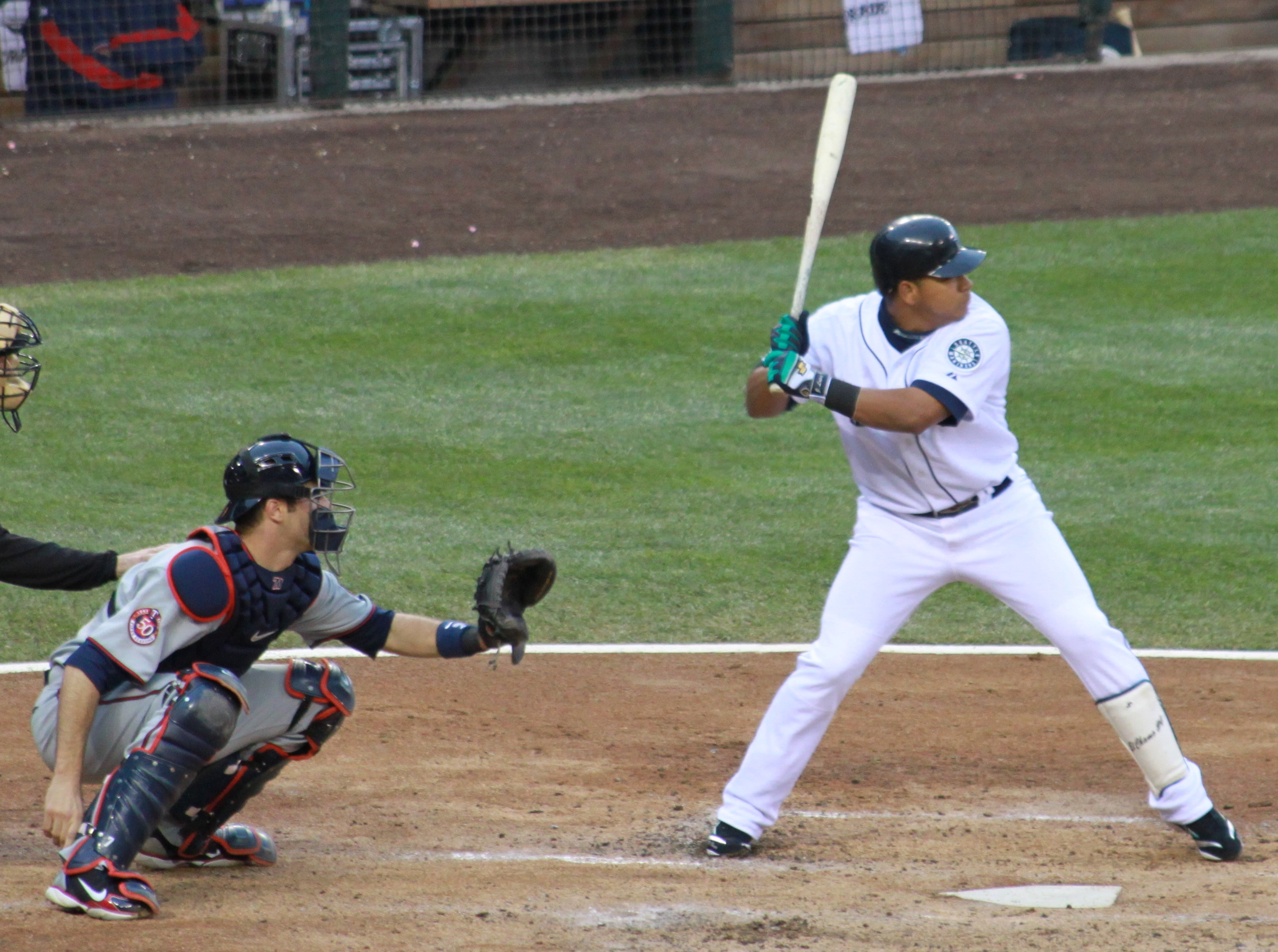
Mauer (left) catching for the Twins in 2010

Mauer underwent arthroscopic knee surgery after the 2010 season, and missed most of spring training due to a difficult recovery from the operation. After further difficulties during the first days of the season, he was placed on the disabled list immediately after the Twins' game on April 15. Team doctors believed his problem, termed a "bilateral leg weakness", was due to too light a workload during spring training. Mauer returned to game action as a designated hitter in extended spring training on May 25, and made his first post-DL appearance as a catcher in another extended spring training game on June 2. The following week, he went on a further rehabilitation assignment to the Twins' Class A affiliate, the Fort Myers Miracle, a team managed by his older brother Jake. After Mauer caught several games with the Miracle, it was speculated he could return to the Twins as early as June 16 or 17, but Twins manager Ron Gardenhire did not commit to a return date. Mauer returned to play with the Twins on June 17, 2011 and received a standing ovation from the fans.

Mauer made his first Major League start at first base on July 7, 2011, in Chicago, where he turned the first ball hit to him into an unassisted double play. In all, he had 13 putouts and two assists and went 3-for-5 at the plate with 2 RBI in a 6–2 victory over the White Sox. On August 18, 2011, Mauer played his first game in right field. He had three putouts and went 1-for-3 with an RBI in an 8–4 Twins loss against the New York Yankees.

Mauer struggled the entire summer with various ailments, from complications due to surgery at the beginning of the season to a bout of pneumonia at the end of the season, and had undoubtedly the worst season of his career. He played in only 82 games all year (career 126 average per season, not counting the 35 games he played in 2004), batted only .287 (career .323), and caught only 52 games. He hoped to return to form in 2012.

At the start of spring training, Mauer expressed strong dissatisfaction with the previous season, saying "I've kind of been answering...questions [about last season] all winter, and it left a bad taste in a lot of people's mouths, and mine included, but it's a new year, and as soon as we can forget about 2011, the better, and focus on not letting it happen again." On July 1, it was announced that he would be headed for his fifth All-Star Game. Mauer's batting average was .325 in the first half of the season, including four homers and 36 RBI. By mid-July, Mauer had the second-highest batting average in the American League. On August 27, Mauer played his 832nd game at catcher for the Twins, breaking a franchise record set by Earl Battey.

=== 2013–2018 ===
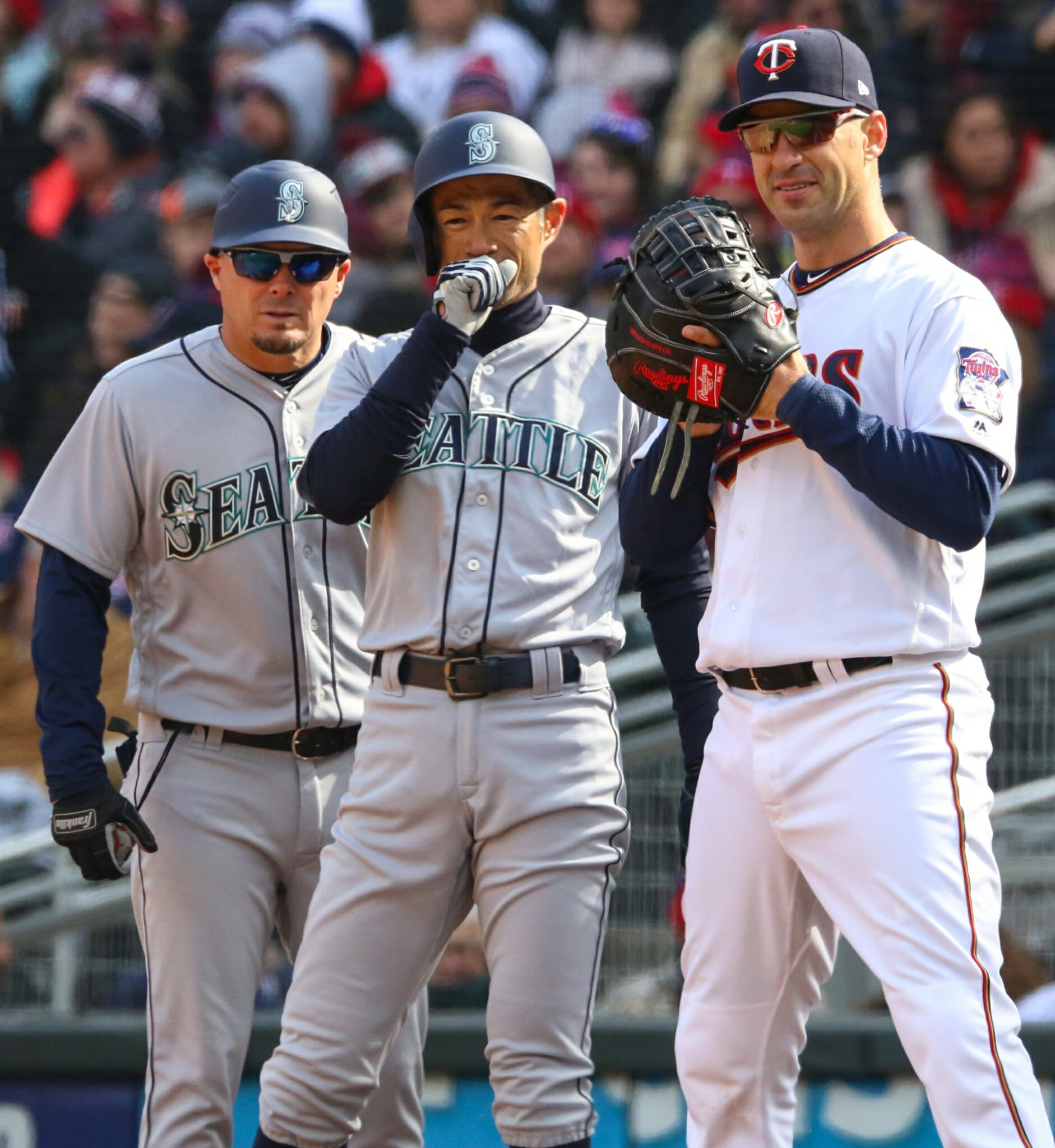
Mauer (right) with Ichiro Suzuki at first base in 2018

Mauer was the Twins' Opening Day catcher, with Ryan Doumit as his backup, and also saw time at first base and designated hitter. Through the first half, he hit .320 with eight home runs, 32 RBI and 50 runs including consecutive four-hit games against the Angels in April and a 15-game hitting streak from April 30 to May 18. He was named to his sixth All-Star Game as the starting catcher. On August 20, Mauer went on the 7-day disabled list with concussion-like symptoms. In his absence, Doumit, Chris Herrmann and Josmil Pinto started at catcher. Mauer never returned to the line-up and his season ended after 113 games. For the season, he hit .324/.404/.476 with 11 home runs, 47 RBI, 62 runs, 35 doubles and 61 walks in 113 games, while earning the 2013 AL Silver Slugger Award at catcher. He and former Yankee Horace Clarke are the only hitters ever to break up three no-hitter bids in the ninth inning.

After the 2013 season, the Twins announced that Mauer would permanently move to first base in order to protect their star player from further concussions and the day-to-day physical wear of being a major league catcher. In 2014, Mauer played in 120 games, compiling a slash line of .277/.361/.371 with four home runs, 55 RBI, 60 runs, and 27 doubles.

Mauer struck out over 100 times for the first time in his career in 2015. He set career marks in games played (158), plate appearances (666) and at bats (592), while batting a career-low .261 with 10 home runs and 66 RBI in 134 games. However, his defense at first base improved, as he committed only two errors all season at first base.

Mauer started his 13th Opening Day in 2017, tying with Harmon Killebrew for the franchise record. For the season, Mauer batted .305 with seven home runs, 71 RBI and an .801 OPS in 141 games.

On April 12, 2018, Mauer became the 287th player in the history of Major League Baseball to collect 2,000 hits with a two-run seventh inning single off White Sox pitcher Aaron Bummer.

In the ninth inning of the last game of the 2018 MLB season on September 30, 2018, at Target Field, amidst speculation that he would retire at the end of the year, Mauer made an appearance as catcher for the first time since his concussion in 2013, before being removed for backup Chris Gimenez after one pitch. He exited to a standing ovation from the crowd and both dugouts. In his last season, he batted .282/.351/.379 with six home runs and 48 RBI in 127 games, and led all major league hitters with a batting average of .407 with runners in scoring position, and saw the highest percentage of fastballs of all MLB hitters (63.6%).

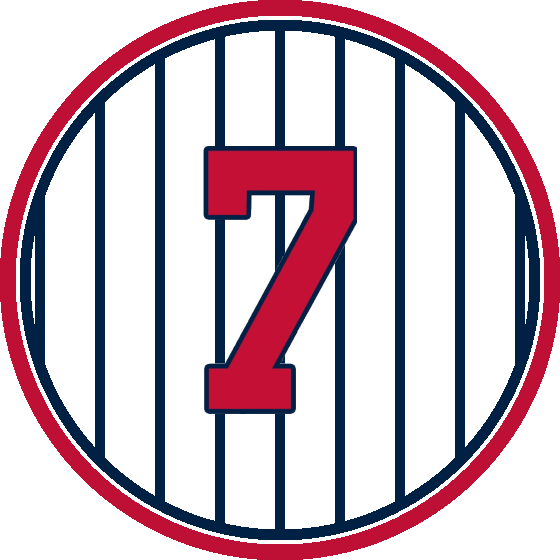
Joe Mauer's number 7 was retired by the Minnesota Twins in 2019.

On November 9, 2018, Mauer officially retired from baseball in an open letter to Twins fans. The Twins announced they would retire Mauer's No. 7 during the 2019 season, eventually setting the date as June 15.

=== MLB records ===
Mauer holds the MLB single-season records for the highest single-season batting average for catchers (.365), which he set in 2009 and the highest single-season on-base percentage for a catcher (.444), which he also set in 2009. His career on-base percentage is the highest among major league catchers with a minimum of 500 games played. Mauer is also the first AL catcher to win a batting title and holds the record for the most batting titles by a catcher in a career (3).

=== Career statistics ===
In 1,858 games over 15 seasons, Mauer posted a .306 batting average (2,123-for-6,930) with 1,018 runs, 428 doubles, 30 triples, 143 home runs, 923 RBIs, 939 bases on balls, .388 on-base percentage and .439 slugging percentage. He finished his career with a .995 fielding percentage at catcher and .996 fielding percentage at first base. Mauer had five career five-hit games and 23 four-hit games in his MLB career.

=== National Baseball Hall of Fame ===
Mauer became eligible for the National Baseball Hall of Fame in 2024. He received 293 votes, 76.1% of the total, enough to be enshrined on his first ballot. He was just the third catcher to be elected on his first ballot, after Johnny Bench and Iván Rodríguez. Additionally, he became the fourth first overall draft pick to be inducted, after Ken Griffey Jr., Chipper Jones, and Harold Baines. Mauer was also the first Hall of Famer to play his entire career in the 21st century and the first to be drafted in that century.

== International career ==
Mauer was selected as a catcher and first baseman for Team USA in the 2013 World Baseball Classic.

== Other work ==
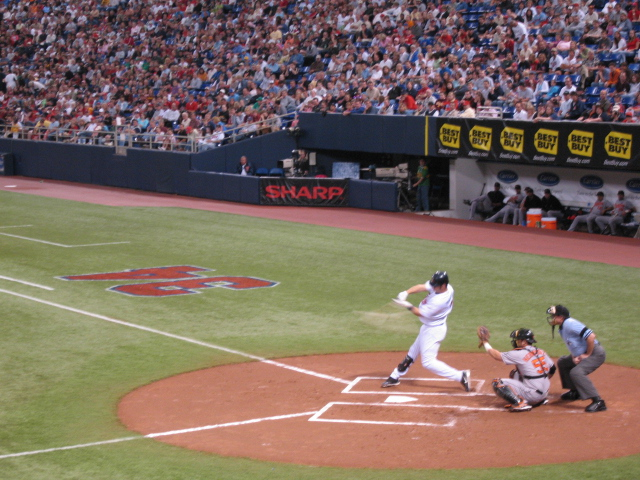
Mauer at bat against Baltimore, Hubert H. Humphrey Metrodome

Mauer modeled for Perry Ellis in the 2004–05 off-season, and is featured in television commercials for Head & Shoulders, Pepsi, ESPN, Fox Sports Net, PlayStation 3, Gatorade and my29.

Mauer's family manufactured and sold a product called Joe Mauer's Quickswing. Invented by Mauer's father, the device allows kids to practice hitting on their own.

Mauer's Quickswing Camp is held annually in the winter at a St. Paul area college. The camp teaches youth the basics of batting skills. Mauer taped an episode of Homecoming with Rick Reilly for ESPN on January 27, 2010, at Cretin-Derham Hall High School, his alma mater, in St. Paul, Minnesota. The episode aired on April 12, 2010.

Mauer appeared in a TV commercial for Explore Minnesota, the state tourism agency, in March 2011.

== Video games ==
Mauer was the cover athlete for Sony Computer Entertainment's MLB 10: The Show and MLB 11: The Show game for the PlayStation platform.

The game's tagline, "Well played, Mauer", used by actor Jerry Lambert (playing the role of fictional vice president Kevin Butler) in television commercials promoting the game (in the ad, Mauer and Butler were playing MLB 11 and Mauer hits a home run to deep right field), was mimicked by Twins announcer Dick Bremer during a game versus the visiting Kansas City Royals on June 10, 2010. Royals outfielder Mitch Maier fouled back a pitch from Twins pitcher Brian Duensing. The ball traveled over the protective net behind the home plate area. Mauer tracked the ball, reached around the screen, and caught it, leading Bremer to exclaim, "Did he catch that? Oh, well played, Mauer!" The catch is featured in MLB 11: The Show's "Joe Mauer" introductory vignette.

Mauer appeared as a playable pro in Backyard Baseball 2009.

== Personal life ==
Mauer shared a house with former Twins teammate Justin Morneau in Saint Paul, Minnesota, during the 2006 season.

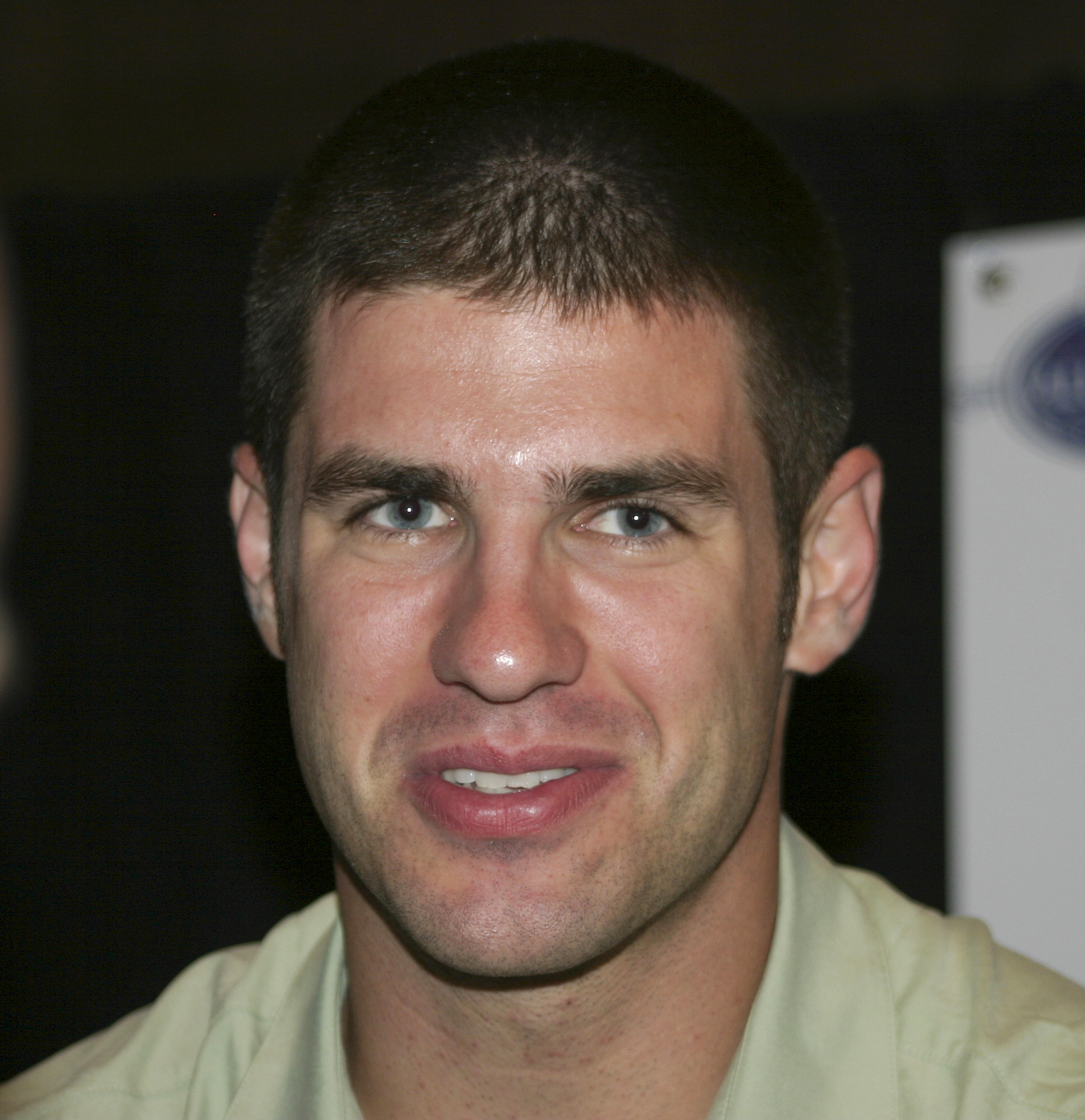
Mauer in July 2008

Mauer wore long sideburns throughout his big league career, and on August 10, 2006, the Twins held "Joe Mauer Sideburns Night" in his honor. The first 10,000 fans were given synthetic sideburns with double-sided tape to share in Mauer's trademark look.

On December 11, 2011, Mauer announced his engagement to Saint Paul nurse Maddie Bisanz, his girlfriend of about 18 months and a fellow graduate of Cretin-Derham Hall High School. The couple was married on December 1, 2012, at Nativity of Our Lord Catholic Church in Saint Paul. Justin Morneau was a groomsman. The Mauers' twin daughters were born on July 24, 2013. On November 14, 2018, they welcomed a son.

In 2012, Mauer bought a house in Sunfish Lake, Minnesota, a Saint Paul suburb.

=== Relatives ===
In the 2001 draft, the Twins also selected Joe's older brother Jake in the 23rd round (677th overall). Jake played at the University of St. Thomas in Saint Paul. Some observers concluded that this was an attempt to induce Joe to sign a contract, but Mike Radcliff, the scouting director of the Twins, denied this. Jake Mauer ended his playing career after the 2005 season but went on to manage the Gulf Coast League Twins (Rookie-level). After winning the GCL South with the Twins in 2009, Jake moved up to the High-A Fort Myers Miracle and managed the team for two seasons. Following the Twins' agreement to add the Cedar Rapids Kernels as the team's Low-A affiliate in November 2012, Mauer was named the team's manager.

Mauer's other brother, Billy, signed with the Twins as an undrafted free agent in 2003 and pitched in the organization for three seasons before chronic shoulder problems forced him to retire from the game. He ended his minor league career with a 3–4 record and 3.66 earned run average (ERA) in 43 games. Billy now owns Mauer Chevrolet and Mauer GMC, auto dealerships in the Twin Cities suburb of Inver Grove Heights.

Joe's father, Jake Mauer II developed the Mauer Quickswing, a hitting aid for players. Along with his brothers Billy and Jake and Baseball Hall of Fame player Paul Molitor (who would eventually become manager of the Twins for Joe's final four seasons before retirement) Joe appeared in promotional videos for the equipment. In January 2023, Jake Mauer II died from lung cancer and Lambert–Eaton myasthenic syndrome.

Joe's cousin, Ken Mauer, is a former referee in the NBA. Another cousin, Mark Mauer, is a former college football coach and player.

== See also ==
- List of first overall Major League Baseball draft picks
- Baseball America Minor League Player of the Year Award
- Baseball America Major League Player of the Year
- List of Gold Glove Award winners at catcher
- List of Silver Slugger Award winners at catcher
- List of Major League Baseball batting champions
- List of Major League Baseball career hits leaders
- List of Major League Baseball career putouts as a catcher leaders
- List of Major League Baseball players who spent their entire career with one franchise

Awards and achievements
Preceded by Miguel Olivo	Topps Rookie All-Star Catcher; 2004	Succeeded by Brian McCann
Preceded by Alex Rodriguez; Evan Longoria	American League Player of the Month; June 2006; May 2009	Succeeded by David Ortiz; B. J. Upton
