= Rick Reilly =

American sportswriter (born 1958)

Rick Reilly

Richard Paul Reilly (born February 3, 1958) is an American sportswriter. Long known for being the "back page" columnist for Sports Illustrated, Reilly moved to ESPN on June 1, 2008, where he was a featured columnist for ESPN.com and wrote the back page column for ESPN the Magazine. Reilly hosted ESPN's Homecoming with Rick Reilly, an interview show, and he is a contributing essayist for ESPN SportsCenter and ABC Sports.

== Career ==
Reilly began his career in 1979 as an undergraduate assistant with the Daily Camera in Boulder, Colorado. He left the Camera in 1981 to be a football writer on the sports staff of the Denver Post, then on to the Los Angeles Times in 1983 before joining Sports Illustrated in 1985. Reilly has become a recognized name in the sportswriting industry because of his human interest pieces; his column, “Life of Reilly” was featured on the back page of SI from 1997 until 2007. The "Life of Reilly" was the first signed opinion piece in SI's history. By some accounts, during his prime he was considered the preeminent sportswriter in the United States. Reilly officially left SI during the week of November 29, 2007, after 23 years with the magazine to join ESPN.

At ESPN, his column “Life of Reilly” appeared in ESPN The Magazine (also on the last page) and on ESPN.com. On March 10, 2010, Reilly announced that he would no longer be writing his opinion column for the magazine, but was going to a regular essay on SportsCenter. Reilly delivered essays from live sporting events for SportsCenter and other ESPN telecasts, such as the U.S. Open, Wimbledon, and the British Open. He also hosted “Homecoming”, an interview program, on ESPN, which was taped in the hometowns of featured guests. The series launched in April 2009.

On March 12, 2014, he announced his retirement from sports writing, and his last column was published on ESPN.com on June 10, 2014. ESPN announced that he would continue working for them in a television-only capacity, including SportsCenter and Sunday NFL Countdown.

=== Awards ===
Reilly has been voted NSSA National Sportswriter of the Year eleven times. He is second only to the late Jim Murray of the Los Angeles Times (14) in number of times winning that award. In 2009, he joined a roster of journalism notables as winner of the Damon Runyon Award for Outstanding Contributions to Journalism. His work has also been recognized by the prestigious Newspaper Guild of New York's Page One Award for Best Magazine Story.

=== Film ===
Reilly co-wrote the screenplay for Leatherheads, a film directed by George Clooney, starring Clooney, Renée Zellweger and John Krasinski and released in April 2008.

Reilly's first novel, Missing Links, has been optioned for development as a feature film.

=== Style ===
Slate's Josh Levin noted that Reilly had an affinity for discussing pro athletes and their accomplishments via tooth jokes. He is especially harsh on dental flossing. He described Tiger Woods's 2002 victory at Augusta as suspenseful as flossing, riding Lance Armstrong's team car about as boring as flossing sharks, would rather floss crocodiles than go skydiving, and stated John Elway's perfect endorsement product would be Johnson & Johnson dental floss.

=== Editorial stances ===
In 2002, after Sammy Sosa's public assertion that if baseball initiated testing for performance-enhancing drugs, he "wanted to be first in line", Reilly suggested that he submit to preemptive, voluntary testing. "Why wait to see what the players' association will do?" Reilly asked. "Why not step up right now and be tested? Show everybody you're clean." Sosa refused, angrily. Reilly described the incident in his column the following week.

Reilly has also been a frequent critic of former San Francisco Giants star Barry Bonds for his treatment of his teammates, his off-field behavior and his alleged steroid use.

Reilly had long defended cyclist Lance Armstrong against accusations of using illegal performance enhancements, in part because his own reporting turned up no evidence corroborating the allegations that had been made against Armstrong over the years. When Armstrong confessed in January 2013 after many years of denials, Reilly wrote a strongly critical piece about Armstrong, saying that he had spent 14 years "polishing a legend that turned out to be plated in fool's gold."

=== Nothing But Nets ===
In 2006, Reilly wrote a column in Sports Illustrated about a program dedicated to providing anti-malaria nets to African children at a cost of $10 per net. His request for contributions elicited a response from thousands and led to the creation of the Nothing But Nets foundation in partnership with the United Nations Foundation.

=== Bibliography ===
Reilly's books include:

- The Boz – (Doubleday, 1988) – Co-author of the best-selling autobiography of Oklahoma linebacker Brian Bosworth.
- Gretzky – (HarperCollins, 1990) – The autobiography of hockey superstar, Wayne Gretzky. Reilly was the co-author with Gretzky.
- I'd Love to but I Have a Game – (Doubleday, 1993) – Co-author with announcer Marv Albert.
- Sir Charles – The Wit and Wisdom of Charles Barkley – (Warner Books, 1994) – Co-author with Charles Barkley.
- Missing Links – (Doubleday, 1996) – A novel about an eccentric group of golfers who are regulars at the worst public golf course in America.
- Slo Mo! – (Doubleday, 1999) – A fictional diary of a naive 7'8" kid taken from high school to the NBA.
- The Life of Reilly – (Total Sports Illustrated, 2000) - An anthology of Reilly's best early works from Sports Illustrated. A New York Times bestseller.
- Who's Your Caddy – (Doubleday, 2003) – A collection of stories about Reilly caddying for several remarkable people ranging from Donald Trump to the blind golfing world champion. A New York Times bestseller.
- Shanks for Nothing – (Doubleday, 2006) – This sequel to Missing Links cracked The New York Times bestseller list. Like Missing Links, it revolves around the antics and camaraderie of the regulars of the Ponkaquogue Municipal Golf Links and Deli.
- Hate Mail from Cheerleaders and Other Adventures from the Life of Reilly – (Sports Illustrated, 2007) – An anthology consisting of one-hundred Reilly's best weekly articles from 2000 to 2006. An instant success, it hit The New York Times bestseller list in its first week.
- Sports from hell – my search for the world's dumbest competition – (Doubleday, 2010)
- Tiger, meet my sister... ...and other things I probably shouldn't have said – (Blue Rider Press, 2014)
- Commander in Cheat: How Golf Explains Trump – (Hachette Books, 2019) – An on-the-ground and behind-the-scenes look at Donald Trump's ethics on and off the course.
- So Help Me Golf – (Hatchette Books, 2022)

== Personal life ==
Reilly appeared in a Miller Lite commercial with Rebecca Romijn in 1999.

Reilly is married and resides in Hermosa Beach, CA and Sedona, AZ. He has three children from his first marriage.
