= Ken Mauer =

American basketball referee (born 1955)

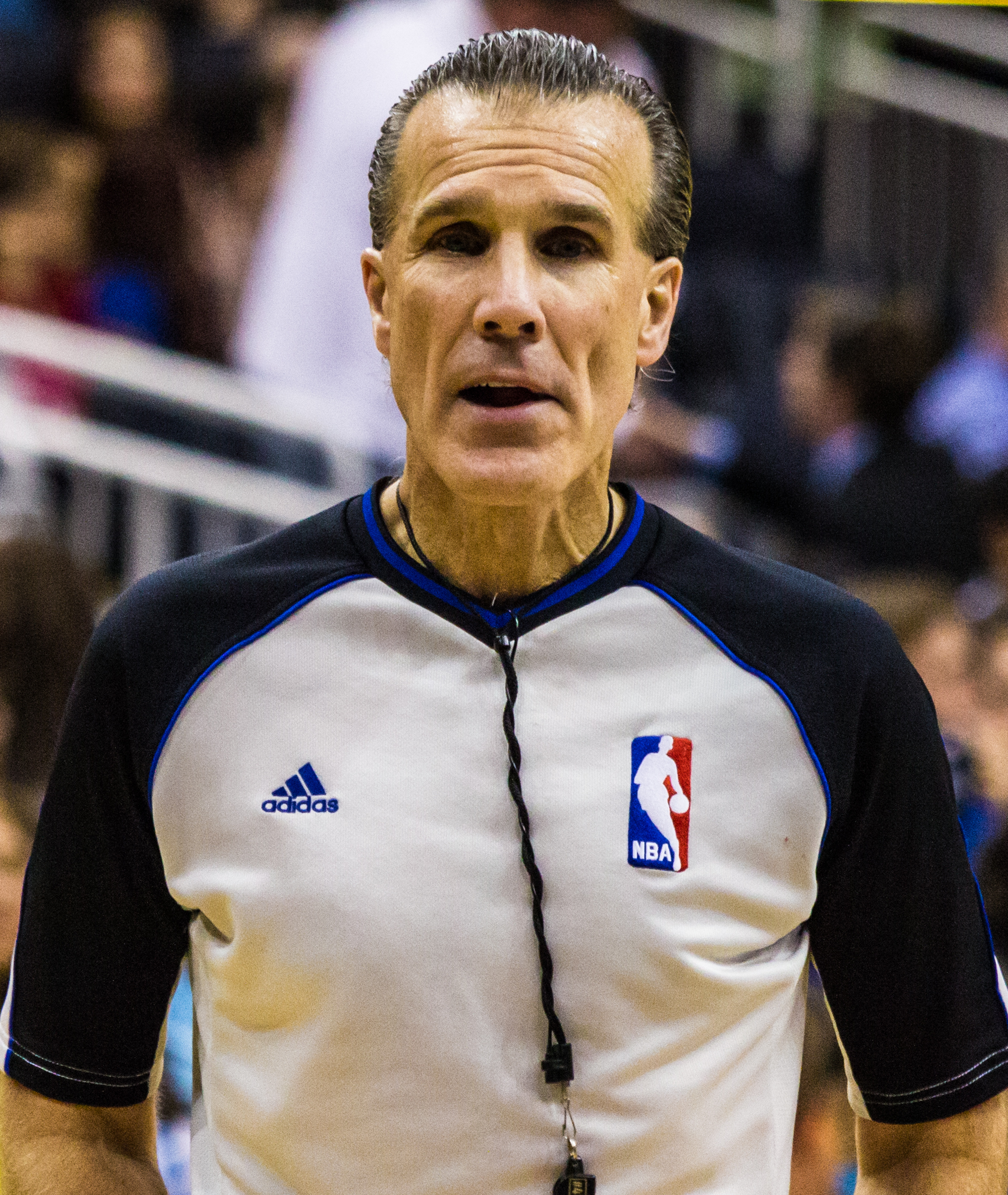
- Born: April 23, 1955 (age 70); St. Paul, Minnesota, U.S.
- Education: University of Minnesota (Bachelor's degree, 1977)
- Occupation: Former NBA referee

Ken Mauer Jr. (born April 23, 1955, in St. Paul, Minnesota) is a former official in the National Basketball Association (NBA) from the 1986–87 NBA season to the 2021-22 NBA season. He believes he was forced to resign for refusal to take the COVID-19 vaccine and was denied a religious exemption. He cited a widely debunked theory that aborted fetal tissue are used in the vaccines as the reason for his refusal. As of the beginning of the 2017–18 NBA season, Mauer officiated in 1,717 regular season and 229 playoff games. Mauer wore uniform number 41.

== Personal life ==
Mauer attended Harding Senior High School in St. Paul and later attended and graduated from the University of Minnesota in 1977. At Minnesota, Mauer played baseball and was named an All-Big Ten player. Mauer comes from a family heavily involved in athletics. Ken's cousins include Joe Mauer and Jake Mauer. Ken's father and four brothers were all referees, including his brother Tom Mauer, a referee in the Women's National Basketball Association. Outside of officiating, Mauer is a guest speaker at basketball officiating camps and clinics and charitable and social groups.

== NBA officiating career ==
=== Early career ===
Mauer officiated for 12 years in the state of Minnesota, nine years at the collegiate level, and later six years in the Continental Basketball Association before being hired by the NBA prior to the 1986–87 season. In 1993, Mauer was selected to officiate the NBA Europe Tour in London, England.

=== NBA Finals debut ===
Mauer was one of 12 referees selected to work the 2006 NBA Finals between the Dallas Mavericks and Miami Heat, the first Finals of his career. Mauer's first game in the championship series was Game 3.
