= Jason Terry =

American basketball player (born 1977)

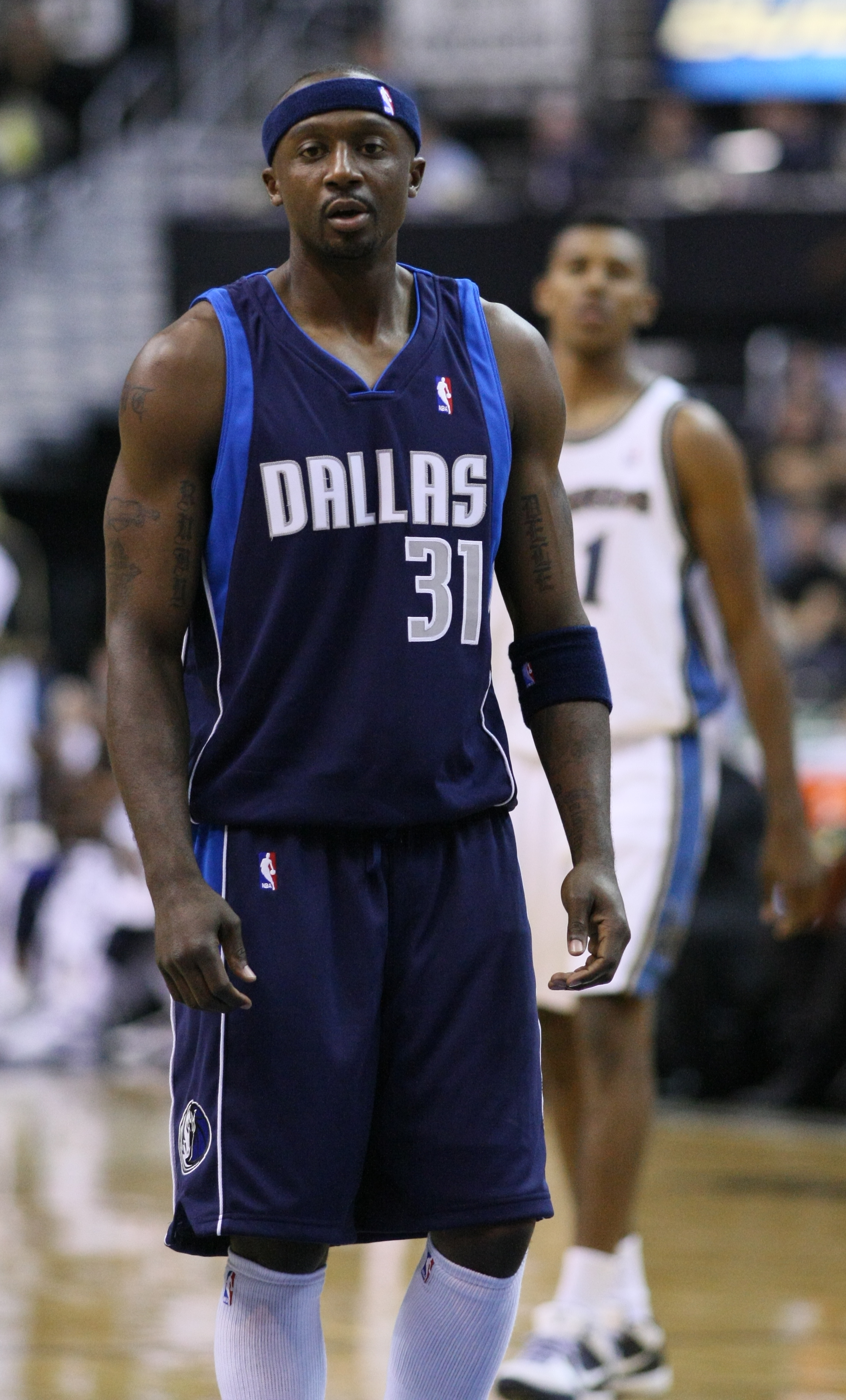
- Terry with the Dallas Mavericks in 2009

Utah Jazz
- Title: Assistant coach
- League: NBA

Personal information
- Born: September 15, 1977 (age 49) Seattle, Washington, U.S.
- Listed height: 6 ft 2 in (1.88 m)
- Listed weight: 185 lb (84 kg)

Career information
- High school: Franklin (Seattle, Washington)
- College: Arizona (1995–1999)
- NBA draft: 1999: 1st round, 10th overall pick
- Drafted by: Atlanta Hawks
- Playing career: 1999–2018
- Position: Shooting guard / point guard
- Number: 31, 4, 3
- Coaching career: 2020–present

Career history

Playing
- 1999–2004: Atlanta Hawks
- 2004–2012: Dallas Mavericks
- 2012–2013: Boston Celtics
- 2013–2014: Brooklyn Nets
- 2014–2016: Houston Rockets
- 2016–2018: Milwaukee Bucks

Career highlights
- NBA champion (2011); NBA Sixth Man of the Year (2009); NBA All-Rookie Second Team (2000); NCAA champion (1997); Consensus first-team All-American (1999); Pac-10 Player of the Year (1999); First-team All-Pac-10 (1999); No. 31 retired by Arizona Wildcats

Career statistics
- Points: 18,881 (13.4 ppg)
- Rebounds: 3,274 (2.3 rpg)
- Assists: 5,415 (3.8 apg)
- Stats at NBA.com
- Stats at Basketball Reference
Medals
Men's basketball
Representing United States
Goodwill Games
Gold medal – first place	2001 Brisbane	National team

Jason Eugene Terry (born September 15, 1977), also known by the initialism JET, is an American professional basketball coach and former player who is an assistant coach for the Utah Jazz of the National Basketball Association (NBA). He played 19 seasons in the NBA as a combo guard. With the Dallas Mavericks, Terry won the NBA Sixth Man of the Year Award in 2009 and an NBA championship in 2011. A prolific 3-point shooter, Terry has made the twelfth-most 3-point field goals in NBA history as of April 2026.

== High school and college career ==
Terry attended Franklin High School in Seattle, Washington, where he won back-to-back state championships in 1994 and 1995. On February 2, 2007, Terry's No. 31 was retired by Franklin High School.

Terry played college basketball for Arizona from 1995 to 1999. As a sophomore on Arizona's NCAA Championship team, Terry made 18 starts and was the Wildcats' fourth-leading scorer at 10.6 points (also averaged 4.4 assists and 2.5 steals). He was named Pac-10 Player of the Year and was an All-Conference First Team selection as a senior. He concluded his career at Arizona ranked 12th in points (1,461), 5th in assists (493) and 2nd in three-point field goals (192). Currently, he is the only player in Arizona history to finish with 1,000 career points and 200 career steals.

In 2015, Terry earned a bachelor's degree in general studies with an emphasis on social, behavioral and human understanding from his alma mater, profiting from their program for former athletes to finish their course work.

== NBA career ==
=== Atlanta Hawks (1999–2004) ===
Terry was selected by the Atlanta Hawks with the 10th overall pick in the 1999 NBA draft. That season, on November 16, 1999, Terry recorded 22 points and 5 assists off the bench in what would be among his best games as a rookie, in a 103–98 win against the Charlotte Hornets. On March 6, 2000, Terry recorded a career-high 6 steals, alongside 12 points and 11 assists, in a loss against the Milwaukee Bucks.

On December 12, 2000, Terry scored a then career-high 38 points in a 107–99 win against the Sacramento Kings. On December 15, 2000, Terry scored 17 points, recorded 13 assists, and grabbed 8 rebounds in a 85–74 win over the Chicago Bulls. During the 2000–01 season, Terry averaged a team and career-high 19.7 points with 3.3 rebounds, 4.9 assists and 1.3 steals. On January 15, 2002, he scored a career-high 46 points against the Dallas Mavericks. On February 28, 2003, he recorded his first career triple-double with 23 points, 10 rebounds and 13 assists against the Chicago Bulls. During the 2002–03 season, Terry was seventh in assists per game, at 7.4.

The Hawks failed to reach the playoffs during Terry's stint in Atlanta. The closest Terry got was in 2003, when despite winning the final eight games of the season, the Hawks finished as the 11th seed in the Eastern Conference with a 35–47 record.

=== Dallas Mavericks (2004–2012) ===
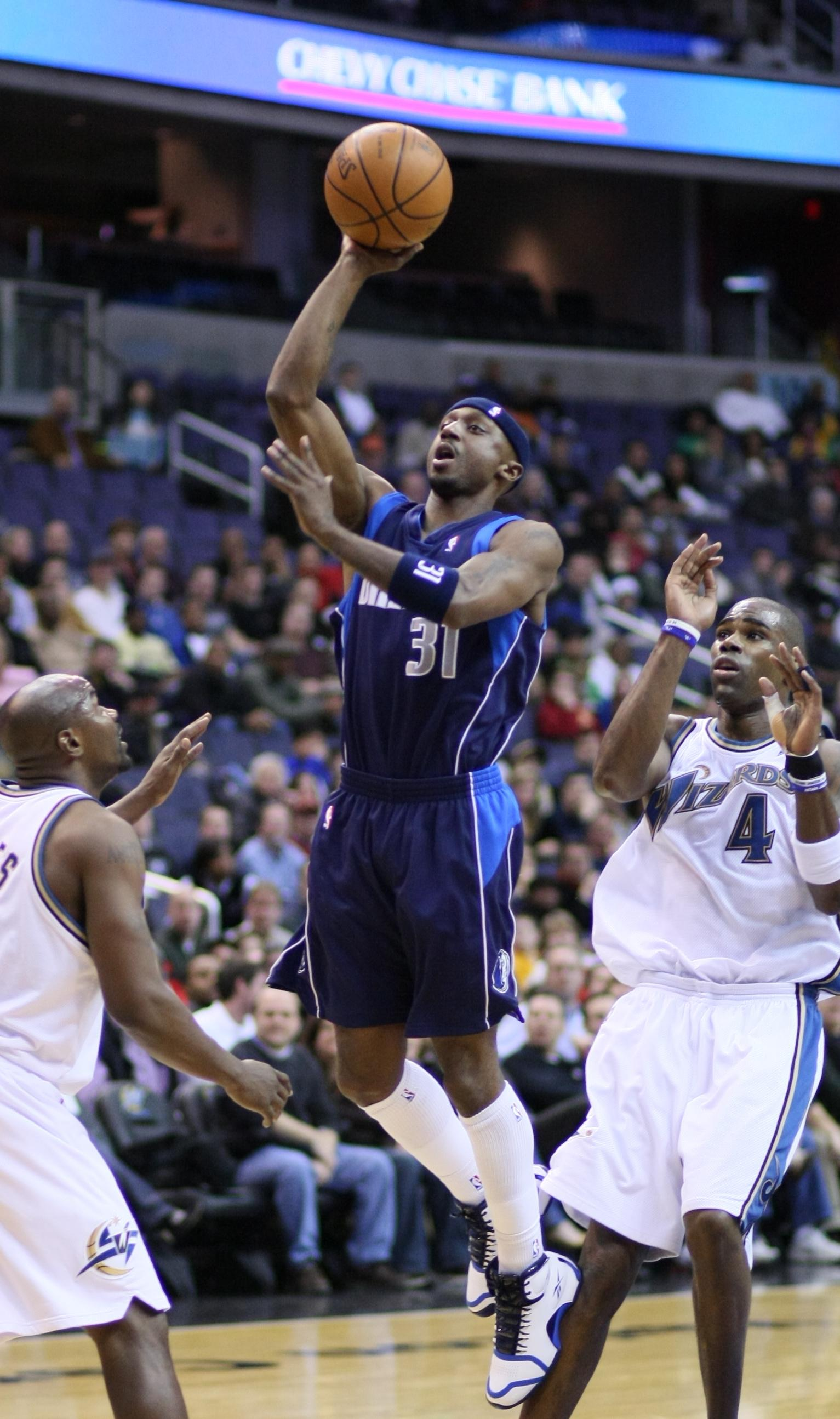
Terry in 2009

On August 4, 2004, Terry was traded by the Hawks along with Alan Henderson and a future first-round draft pick to the Dallas Mavericks in exchange for Antoine Walker and Tony Delk. Known by his initials JET, mimicking an airplane with his arms as the wings became part of his persona in Dallas. He quickly emerged as a fan favorite despite arriving as the replacement for Steve Nash after the unpopular decision to let Nash leave in free agency.

In his first season in Dallas, Terry appeared in a team-high 80 games (started 57 of final 58 games) and averaged 12.4 points, 2.4 rebounds, team-high 5.4 assists and 1.4 steals in 30.0 minutes per game. He joined Steve Nash as the only other player to shoot at least 50% from the floor, 40% from 3-point range and 80% from the foul line.

In 80 games during the 2005–06 season, Terry averaged 17.1 points, 2.0 rebounds, team-high 3.8 assists and 1.3 steals in 35.0 minutes per game. He helped the Mavericks reach the 2006 NBA Finals. He had 32 points in 37 minutes in Game 1 against the Miami Heat to become the fifth player to score at least 30 points in his first NBA Finals game, joining Michael Jordan, Shawn Kemp, Tim Duncan and Allen Iverson. In Game 5 of the series, Terry had 35 points. Despite going up 2–0 in the series, the Mavericks lost to Miami in six games.

On July 1, 2006, Terry and the Mavericks agreed on a six-year deal believed to be worth more than $50 million.

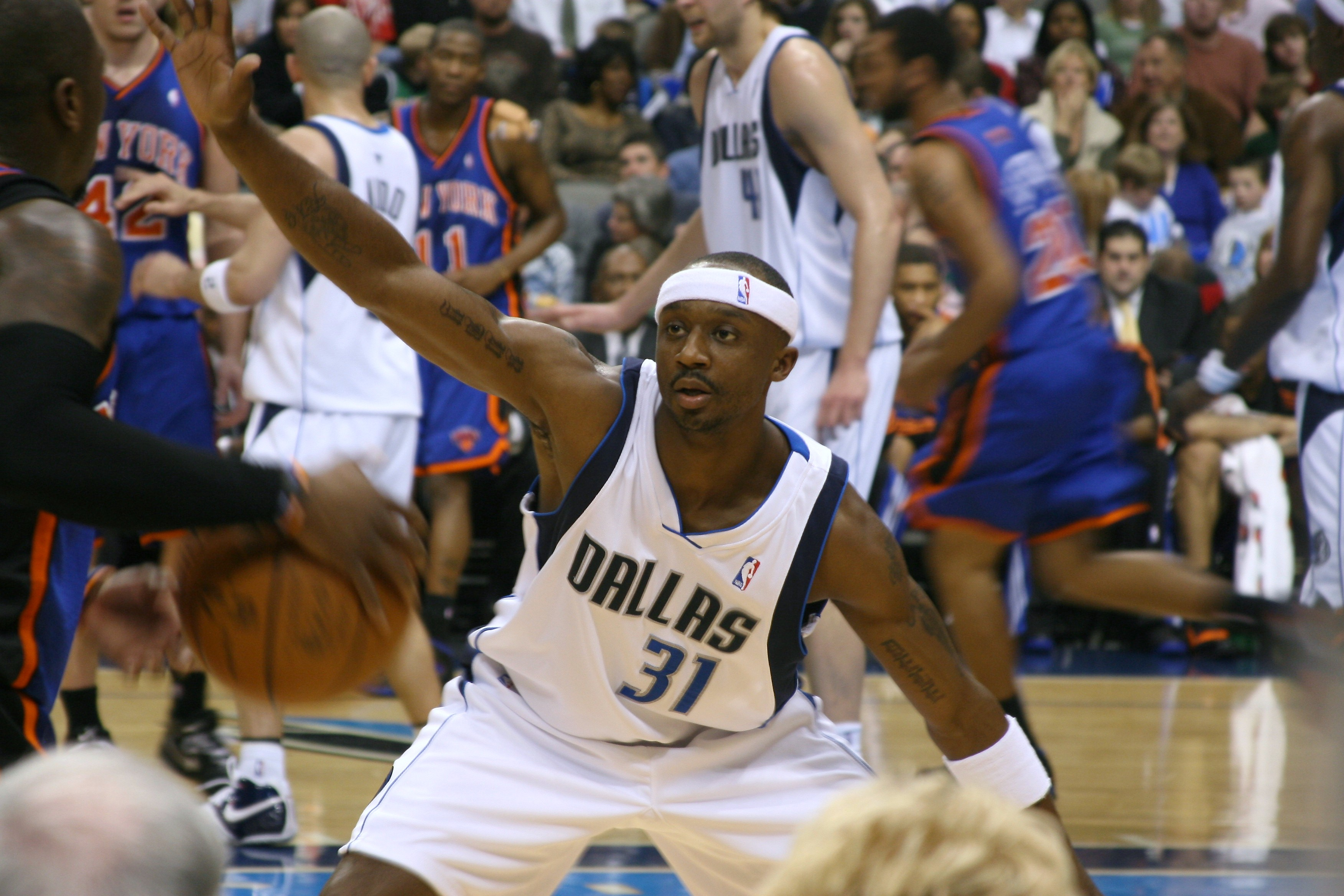
Terry with the Mavericks in 2008

In April 2009, Terry was named the NBA Sixth Man of the Year for the 2008–09 season. A sixth man in 63 of 74 games played in 2008–09, Terry averaged 19.6 points, 2.4 rebounds, 3.4 assists and 1.3 steals in 33.6 minutes. He shot .463 from the field, .366 from beyond the three-point line and .880 from the free throw line. Among NBA leaders, Terry ranked 10th in three-pointers made (167), 11th in free throw percentage, 17th in steals, and tied for 22nd in scoring average.

In 2010–11, Terry averaged 15.8 points, 1.9 rebounds, 4.1 assists and 31.1 minutes in 82 games (10 starts). He was the only Maverick to appear in all 82 games in 2010–11. On November 6, 2010, he scored 26 points against the Denver Nuggets. He scored 23 of his 26 points in the 1st half, the most he's recorded in the first half of a game in his career (previous high 22, against the Portland Trail Blazers on April 7, 2007). In the West Conference Semifinals against the Los Angeles Lakers, Terry scored a playoff-high 32 points in Game 4. His 9 3-pointers tied an NBA playoff record held by Rex Chapman, who set it in April 1997 with the Phoenix Suns. It was surpassed by Klay Thompson (11) in 2016 and Damian Lillard (12, 2OT) in 2021. As of 2022, it still stood as the most by a reserve in a playoff game. The Mavericks went on to advance to the NBA Finals for just the second time in franchise history. In the 2011 NBA Finals, against the Miami Heat, Terry averaged 18.0 points, 2.0 rebounds, 3.2 assists, 1.3 steals and 32.5 minutes over the six games. He recorded 21 points, 4 rebounds and 6 assists in 30 minutes in Game 5 to become the first sub to record at least 20 points and 5 assists in a Finals game since Michael Cooper in 1987. Terry had a game-high 27 points in 34 minutes in the series-clinching Game 6 to claim his first NBA Championship.

In the lockout-shortened 2011–12 season, Terry averaged 15.1 points, 2.4 rebounds and 3.6 assists while shooting 37.8% from three-point territory. He finished second in the league with 138 made three-pointers and was third in the NBA in three-point field goal attempts (365). He concluded his time in Dallas with the fourth-most three-point shots in NBA history with 1,788, trailing only Ray Allen, Reggie Miller and teammate Jason Kidd.

=== Boston Celtics (2012–2013) ===
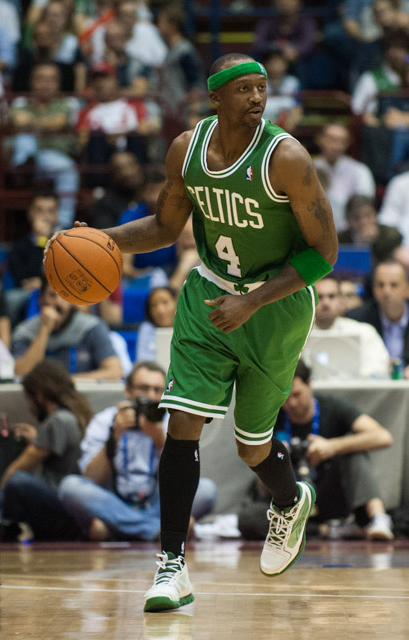
Terry with the Boston Celtics in 2012

On July 18, 2012, Terry signed a multi-year deal with the Boston Celtics. He averaged 10.1 points, 2.0 rebounds, 2.5 assists and 0.84 steals in 26.9 minutes per game during the 2012–13 season. He recorded his first double-double as a Celtic with 17 points and season-high 11 assists to go along with three steals against the Milwaukee Bucks on December 1, 2012. He scored a season-high 26 points against the Denver Nuggets on February 10, 2013.

=== Brooklyn Nets (2013–2014) ===
On June 28, 2013, the day of the NBA draft, the Boston Celtics and Brooklyn Nets reached a deal to trade Terry, Paul Pierce and Kevin Garnett for future first-round picks in the 2014, 2016, and 2018 drafts and Kris Humphries, Gerald Wallace, Kris Joseph, MarShon Brooks, and Keith Bogans. The deal was finalized on July 12, 2013.

On February 19, 2014, Terry was traded, along with Reggie Evans, to the Sacramento Kings in exchange for Marcus Thornton. It was later announced that due to a lingering knee injury, Terry wouldn't join the team in 2013–14; instead he rehabilitated the injury in Dallas to prepare for 2014–15. He did not appear in a game for the Kings during his time with the organization.

=== Houston Rockets (2014–2016) ===
On September 17, 2014, Terry was traded, along with two future second-round picks, to the Houston Rockets in exchange for Alonzo Gee and Scotty Hopson. On December 22, 2014, in a 110–95 win over the Portland Trail Blazers, Terry hit a 3-pointer in the third quarter to become the third player in NBA history to make 2,000 three-pointers, joining Ray Allen and Reggie Miller.

On August 24, 2015, Terry re-signed with the Rockets. In July 2016, he parted ways with the Rockets.

=== Milwaukee Bucks (2016–2018) ===
On August 22, 2016, Terry signed with the Milwaukee Bucks. On February 24, 2017, in Milwaukee's 109–95 loss to the Utah Jazz, Terry became the oldest player to play for the Bucks, at 39 years, 162 days, passing Dale Ellis (39 years, 155 days). On April 10, 2017, he had season highs of 15 points and five 3-pointers in an 89–79 win over the Charlotte Hornets. That was the only time in 74 games in 2016–17 that he finished with 10 points or more.

On September 18, 2017, Terry re-signed with the Bucks. On December 5, 2017, he was ruled out for two or more weeks after suffering a left calf strain the previous night against the Boston Celtics. On January 28, 2018, he scored a season-high 12 points in a 110–96 win over the Chicago Bulls. Terry hadn't scored in double figures since his 15-point outing against Charlotte on April 10, 2017. On February 10, 2018, he came off the bench to score 11 points in the second half in the Bucks' 111–104 victory over the Orlando Magic. On February 23, 2018, he had a 14-point effort in a 122–119 overtime win over the Toronto Raptors. On March 2, 2018, in a 103–96 loss to the Indiana Pacers, Terry made his first start since January 22, 2016, with Houston. He blocked three shots for the first time since December 22, 2010, with Dallas against Philadelphia.

== Career statistics ==
Legend
GP	Games played	GS	Games started	MPG	Minutes per game
FG%	Field goal percentage	3P%	3-point field goal percentage	FT%	Free throw percentage
RPG	Rebounds per game	APG	Assists per game	SPG	Steals per game
BPG	Blocks per game	PPG	Points per game	**Bold**	Career high
†	Won an NBA championship	*	Led the league

=== NBA ===
==== Regular season ====
Year	Team	GP	GS	MPG	FG%	3P%	FT%	RPG	APG	SPG	BPG	PPG
1999–00	Atlanta	81	27	23.3	.415	.293	.807	2.0	4.3	1.1	.1	8.1
2000–01	Atlanta	**82**	77	37.7	.436	.395	.846	3.3	4.9	1.3	.1	**19.7**
2001–02	Atlanta	78	78	**38.0**	.430	.387	.835	3.5	5.7	**1.8**	.2	19.3
2002–03	Atlanta	81	**81**	**38.0**	.428	.371	.887	3.4	**7.4**	1.6	.2	17.2
2003–04	Atlanta	81	78	37.3	.417	.347	.827	**4.1**	5.4	1.5	.2	16.8
2004–05	Dallas	80	57	30.0	**.501**	.420	.844	2.4	5.4	1.4	.2	12.4
2005–06	Dallas	80	80	35.0	.470	.411	.800	2.0	3.8	1.3	**.3**	17.1
2006–07	Dallas	81	80	35.1	.484	**.438**	.804	2.9	5.2	1.0	.2	16.7
2007–08	Dallas	**82***	34	31.5	.467	.375	.857	2.5	3.2	1.1	.2	15.5
2008–09	Dallas	74	11	33.7	.463	.366	.880	2.4	3.4	1.3	**.3**	19.6
2009–10	Dallas	77	12	33.0	.438	.365	.866	1.8	3.8	1.2	.2	16.6
2010–11†	Dallas	**82**	10	31.3	.451	.362	.850	1.9	4.1	1.1	.2	15.8
2011–12	Dallas	63	1	31.7	.430	.378	.883	2.4	3.6	1.2	.2	15.1
2012–13	Boston	79	24	26.9	.434	.372	.870	2.0	2.5	.8	.1	10.1
2013–14	Brooklyn	35	0	16.3	.362	.379	.667	1.1	1.6	.4	.0	4.5
2014–15	Houston	77	18	21.3	.422	.390	.813	1.6	1.9	.9	.2	7.0
2015–16	Houston	72	7	17.5	.402	.356	.818	1.1	1.4	.7	.1	5.9
2016–17	Milwaukee	74	0	18.4	.432	.427	.828	1.4	1.3	.6	**.3**	4.1
2017–18	Milwaukee	51	4	16.0	.383	.348	**.889**	.9	1.2	.8	**.3**	3.3
Career		1,410	679	29.8	.444	.380	.845	2.3	3.8	1.1	.2	13.4

==== Playoffs ====
Year	Team	GP	GS	MPG	FG%	3P%	FT%	RPG	APG	SPG	BPG	PPG
2005	Dallas	13	13	**38.5**	**.506**	.491	.884	**4.2**	4.6	**1.3**	**.5**	17.5
2006	Dallas	**22**	**22**	38.4	.442	.307	.831	2.9	3.8	1.2	.0	**18.9**
2007	Dallas	6	6	38.2	.424	.281	.833	2.3	3.7	.8	.3	17.0
2008	Dallas	5	3	36.0	.433	.438	.867	1.6	**4.8**	.4	.2	15.8
2009	Dallas	10	1	32.5	.389	.373	.767	2.8	1.9	.6	.3	14.3
2010	Dallas	6	0	29.0	.377	.400	.750	2.5	2.0	.7	.2	12.7
2011†	Dallas	21	0	32.6	.478	.442	.843	1.9	3.2	1.2	.1	17.5
2012	Dallas	4	1	34.8	.455	**.500**	.625	2.3	3.8	.3	.0	13.8
2013	Boston	6	1	31.5	.444	.441	.818	2.2	2.0	.7	.3	12.0
2015	Houston	17	17	28.6	.425	.354	.813	2.2	2.8	.9	.1	9.2
2016	Houston	5	0	24.8	.342	.316	**1.000**	2.2	1.2	.4	.2	7.0
2017	Milwaukee	6	0	11.3	.333	.200	**1.000**	1.3	.8	.5	.2	2.5
2018	Milwaukee	3	0	14.7	.400	.400	–	1.0	.7	.3	.0	2.0
Career		124	64	32.2	.441	.385	.829	2.5	3.0	.9	.2	14.1

=== College ===
Year	Team	GP	GS	MPG	FG%	3P%	FT%	RPG	APG	SPG	BPG	PPG
1995–96	Arizona	31	0	9.8	**.542**	**.577**	.593	.7	1.1	.6	.0	3.1
1996–97	Arizona	34	18	30.5	.443	.331	.713	2.7	4.4	2.5	.1	10.6
1997–98	Arizona	**35**	0	22.8	.422	.347	.827	2.4	4.3	1.7	**.2**	10.6
1998–99	Arizona	29	**29**	**38.2**	.443	.398	**.839**	**3.3**	**5.5**	**2.8**	**.2**	**21.9**
Career		129	47	25.1	.443	.374	.784	2.3	3.8	1.9	.1	11.3

== National team career ==
Terry was a member of the United States squad that competed in the 2001 Goodwill Games in Brisbane, Australia.

== Post-playing career ==
In September 2019, Terry was appointed assistant general manager of the Texas Legends of the NBA G League, ending his 19-year playing career. In May 2020, Terry was appointed an assistant coach for the Arizona Wildcats. After one season in Arizona, he returned to the G League as the head coach of the Grand Rapids Gold, the new affiliate of the Denver Nuggets. In July 2022, he would join the coaching staff of the Utah Jazz as an assistant coach under new head coach Will Hardy.

== Player profile ==
An elite shooter, Terry has made the tenth-most career three-pointers in NBA history. He frequently pulled up for midrange jump shots off the dribble, and during his time in Dallas, Terry relished the role of fourth-quarter specialist.

== Personal life ==
Terry was one of ten children raised by his mother, Andrea Cheatham, and his father, Curtis Terry. One of his brothers, Curtis, played professional basketball between 2008 and 2012. Terry is the cousin of former NBA player Martell Webster.

Terry and his wife, Johnyika, have five daughters.

Prior to the Mavericks' 2010–11 championship-winning season, Terry tattooed the Larry O'Brien Championship Trophy on his right biceps. Two years later, prior to the 2012–13 season, Terry tattooed the Celtics' famous leprechaun spinning the trophy on his finger on his left arm. He also got a tattoo related to the Brooklyn Nets in 2013, though it did not reference a championship trophy.

== Controversies ==
NCAA Lawsuit Over Name, Image, and Likeness (NIL)

In July 2024, Terry and three other former University of Arizona basketball players initiated legal action against the NCAA. The lawsuit alleged that the NCAA had utilized their name, image, and likeness (NIL) without consent in March Madness highlight reels and promotional materials. The plaintiffs sought compensation for the unauthorized use of their identities.

"Terry became involved in a legal dispute with jeweler Eric Mavani in September 2023 over a $25,000 Rolex watch he had rented but allegedly neither paid for nor returned."

1999 NCAA Tournament Violation

While attending the University of Arizona, Terry was implicated in a controversy related to NCAA rules violations. In 1999, reports indicated that he had received approximately $11,500 in unauthorized benefits from agents. Consequently, the university forfeited its sole game in the 1999 NCAA Tournament and returned 45% of its tournament revenue share.

== See also ==
- List of NBA career steals leaders
- List of NBA career 3-point scoring leaders
- List of NBA career minutes played leaders
- List of NBA career games played leaders
- List of NBA seasons played leaders
- List of oldest and youngest NBA players
