= 2010 NBA playoffs =

Postseason tournament

Tournament details
- Dates: April 17–June 17, 2010
- Season: 2009–10
- Teams: 16

Final positions
- Champions: Los Angeles Lakers (16th title)
- Runners-up: Boston Celtics
- Semifinalists: Orlando Magic; Phoenix Suns

Tournament statistics
- Scoring leader(s): Kobe Bryant (Lakers) (29.2 PPG)

Awards
- MVP: Kobe Bryant (Lakers)

The 2010 NBA playoffs was the postseason tournament of the National Basketball Association's 2009-10 season. The tournament concluded with the Western Conference champion and defending champion Los Angeles Lakers defeating the Eastern Conference champion Boston Celtics 4 games to 3 in the NBA Finals. Kobe Bryant was named NBA Finals MVP for the second straight year.

== Overview ==
=== Western Conference ===
For the 2nd time in 3 seasons and the first time since 2008, all Western Conference playoff teams had at least 50 wins. The 7 games separating 1–8 was tied for the smallest margin, also from 2008.

The Phoenix Suns returned to the playoffs after a one-season absence.

The Oklahoma City Thunder made their first playoff appearance since relocating from Seattle in 2008; the team's last appearance was as the Seattle SuperSonics in 2005. They made the most of their debut playoff appearance, pushing the eventual champion Lakers to six games.

The Portland Trail Blazers, San Antonio Spurs, and Oklahoma City Thunder entered the playoffs tied with 50 regular season wins. The Trail Blazers won the overall tie breaker, and were seeded sixth. The Spurs and Thunder were seeded seventh and eighth, respectively.

=== Eastern Conference ===
The Cleveland Cavaliers entered the NBA Playoffs with the league's best record for the second straight season. Their 61 wins in the NBA was the smallest win total for best record since the Pacers won 61 in 2004. However, due to LeBron James joining the Miami Heat the following season, this would be the Cavaliers' last postseason appearance until 2015, which was also James' first season back with the Cavaliers.

The Boston Celtics, who won the Atlantic Division, entered the playoffs as a fourth seed. This would be the first time since 2008 that this occurred.

The Charlotte Bobcats made their first playoff appearance in franchise history, and the first in the Charlotte NBA team's history since 2002.

The Detroit Pistons missed the playoffs for the first time since 2001.

=== First Round ===
Games 3, 4, and 6 of the Lakers-Thunder series were the first playoff games ever played at Ford Center (the arena's former tenants, the New Orleans/Oklahoma City Hornets, didn't play a single playoff game in the building).

With the Orlando Magic sweeping the Charlotte Bobcats in Game 4, this marks the 34th year in a row that a sweep occurred in the NBA playoffs. The last time a sweep did not occur was 1976.

With their first-round win over the Chicago Bulls, The Cleveland Cavaliers beat the Bulls in a playoff series for the first time since The Shot.

With their first-round win over the Dallas Mavericks, the San Antonio Spurs became the first seventh seed since 1998 (and fifth overall) to beat a second seeded team in a playoff series. This would not happen again until 2023, when the Los Angeles Lakers defeated the Memphis Grizzlies. In addition, the Spurs also avenged their own series losses to the Mavericks, who beat them twice in the previous four seasons. It was also the Spurs’ first series win against the Mavericks since 2003.

With their first-round loss to the San Antonio Spurs, the Dallas Mavericks earned the dubious distinction of losing 3 first round series while holding the top 2 playoff seeds. They lost to the seventh-seeded San Antonio Spurs in 6. They have also lost a playoff series against the Seattle SuperSonics (1987, as the second seed) and the Golden State Warriors (2007, as the top seed).

The Hawks–Bucks series was the first of the 2010 playoffs to have a game 7, marking the 11th consecutive year in the NBA playoffs to feature a game 7. The last time a game 7 did not occur in the playoffs was 1999.

=== Conference Semifinals ===
With a conference semifinals sweep over the seventh–seeded San Antonio Spurs, the Phoenix Suns defeated the Spurs in the postseason for the first time since 2000. Prior to this, the Spurs won the previous four meetings. The Suns also made the conference finals for the first time since 2006.

With a conference semifinals sweep of the Atlanta Hawks, the Orlando Magic became the third team in NBA history to go 8–0 through the first two rounds of the playoffs. As of 2024, this remains the Magic's most recent series victory.

The Cavaliers–Celtics series was extremely notable because marked the first time that each team lost a home playoff game by record margins: Boston lost Game 3 124–95; Cleveland lost Game 5 120–88. The Cavaliers' second round playoff exit (4–2 vs. Boston) was the earliest for the top seed since the Dallas Mavericks' first round loss to the Golden State Warriors in 2007. Game 6 of the same series was LeBron James’ last game with the Cleveland Cavaliers until 2014.

=== Conference Finals ===
Game 5 of the Magic-Celtics series was the last game played at Amway Arena (formerly known as Orlando Arena and TD Waterhouse Centre).

With a Game 6 win over the Orlando Magic, the Boston Celtics advanced to the NBA Finals for the second time in three seasons. With the win, the Celtics avenged the Magic for last year's Game 7 loss. With the loss, the Magic, who last year upset the top-seeded Cavaliers in 6 (after they went 8–0 through the first two rounds), suffered the same fate as last season's Cavaliers by becoming the third straight team to go 8–0 through the first two rounds, only to lose in the conference finals.

With a Game 6 win over the Phoenix Suns, the Los Angeles Lakers advanced to the NBA Finals for the third straight season. In addition, the Lakers avenged the Suns for their first round losses in 2006 (in which the Lakers led 3–1 before losing the series) and 2007. The Suns would not return to the playoffs until 2021.

=== NBA Finals ===
The 2010 NBA Finals featured a 2008 Finals rematch between the Boston Celtics and Los Angeles Lakers, marking the first time since 2005 that the last two NBA Champions met in the NBA Finals.

The 2010 NBA Finals would be the last NBA Finals featuring Kobe Bryant, Paul Pierce, Kevin Garnett, and Rasheed Wallace. It would also be the last NBA Finals to feature Phil Jackson as a head coach.

With a Game 7 win, the Los Angeles Lakers beat the Celtics, who defeated them in the 2008 NBA Finals, to win their 16th NBA Championship. The Lakers also became the third team under the 2-3-2 format to come back from a 3–2 deficit to win the final two games at home (the other two teams being their 1988 team and the 1994 Houston Rockets. The Lakers would not return to the NBA Finals until 2020, while the Celtics would not return until 2022.

== Format ==
The 3 division winners and 5 other teams with the most wins from each conference qualified for the playoffs. The seedings are based on each team's record; however, a division winner is guaranteed to be ranked at least fourth, regardless of record.

=== Tiebreak procedures ===
The tiebreakers that determine seedings were:

1. Division leader wins tie from team not leading a division
2. Head-to-head record
3. Division record (if the teams are in the same division)
4. Conference record
5. Record vs. playoff teams, own conference
6. Record vs. playoff teams, other conference
7. Point differential, all games

If there were more than two teams tied, the team that wins the tiebreaker get the highest seed, while the other teams were "re-broken" from the first step until all ties were resolved. Since the three division winners were guaranteed a spot in the top four, ties to determine the division winners had to be broken before any other ties.

== Playoff qualifying ==
=== Eastern Conference ===
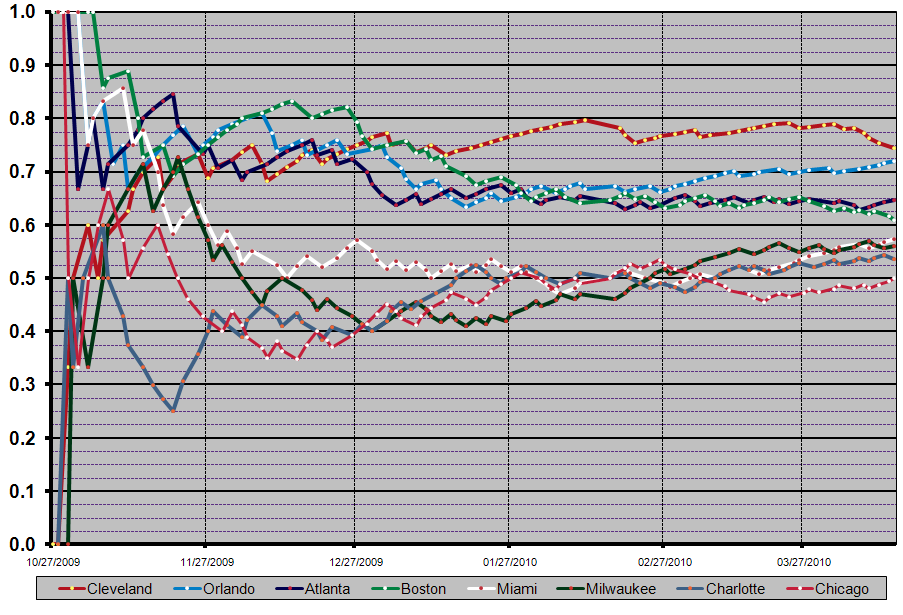
Team standings progression on the teams that qualified for the playoffs.

Seed	Team	Wins	Clinched			
Seed	Team	Wins	Playoff berth	Division title	Best record in Conference	Best record in NBA
1	Cleveland Cavaliers	61	March 8	March 17	April 2	April 4
2	Orlando Magic	59	March 16	April 5	—	—
3	Atlanta Hawks	53	March 21	—	—	—
4	Boston Celtics	50	March 24	March 26	—	—
5	Miami Heat	47	April 6	—	—	—
6	Milwaukee Bucks	46	April 6	—	—	—
7	Charlotte Bobcats	44	April 6	—	—	—
8	Chicago Bulls	41	April 14	—	—	—

=== Western Conference ===
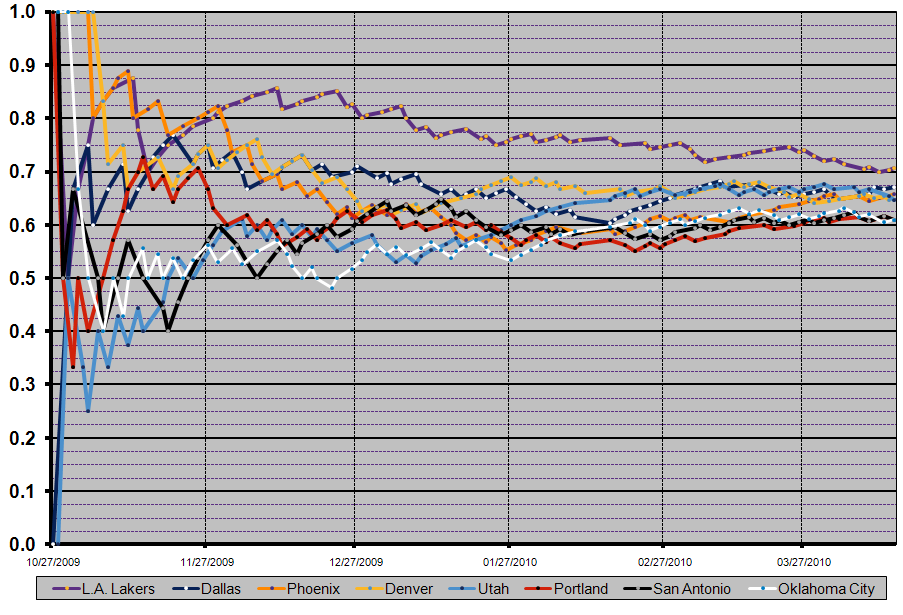
Team standings progression on the teams that qualified for the playoffs.

Seed	Team	Wins	Tiebreaker	Clinched		
Seed	Team	Wins	Tiebreaker	Playoff berth	Division title	Best record in Conference
1	Los Angeles Lakers	57	—	March 19	April 3	April 9
2	Dallas Mavericks	55	—	March 26	April 9	—
3	Phoenix Suns	54	—	March 30	—	—
4	Denver Nuggets	53	3–1 vs. UTA	March 28	April 14	—
5	Utah Jazz	53	1–3 vs. DEN	March 28	—	—
6	Portland Trail Blazers	50	6–1 vs. SA and OKC	March 31	—	—
7	San Antonio Spurs	50	3–4 vs. POR and OKC	April 4	—	—
8	Oklahoma City Thunder	50	2–6 vs. POR and SA	April 3	—	—

— = Not Applicable

== Home-court advantage ==
The team with the better record earned the home-court advantage through any playoff round, regardless of seeding. (The NBA is the only one of the four major North American leagues that awards home advantage based strictly on record.)

Rank	Team	Conference	Division	Wins	Losses
1	Cleveland Cavaliers	Eastern	Central	61	21
2	Orlando Magic	Eastern	Southeast	59	23
3	Los Angeles Lakers	Western	Pacific	57	25
4	Dallas Mavericks	Western	Southwest	55	27
5	Phoenix Suns	Western	Pacific	54	28
6	Denver Nuggets	Western	Northwest	53	29
7	Atlanta Hawks	Eastern	Southeast	53	29
8	Utah Jazz	Western	Northwest	53	29
9	Boston Celtics	Eastern	Atlantic	50	32
10	Portland Trail Blazers	Western	Northwest	50	32
11	San Antonio Spurs	Western	Southwest	50	32
12	Oklahoma City Thunder	Western	Northwest	50	32
13	Miami Heat	Eastern	Southeast	47	35
14	Milwaukee Bucks	Eastern	Central	46	36
15	Charlotte Bobcats	Eastern	Southeast	44	38
16	Chicago Bulls	Eastern	Central	41	41

== Bracket ==
Teams in bold advanced to the next round. The numbers to the left of each team indicate the team's seeding in its conference, and the numbers to the right indicate the number of games the team won in that round. The division champions are marked by an asterisk. Home court advantage in the NBA Finals does not necessarily belong to the higher-seeded team, but instead the team with the better regular season record (for example, the 4th seed in the Western Conference could have a better regular season record than the 3rd seed in the Eastern Conference and would therefore have home court advantage if the two met in the Finals); teams with home court advantage are shown in italics.

First Round	Conference Semifinals
**E1**	**Cleveland***	**4**
E8	Chicago	1
E1	Cleveland*	2
**E4**	**Boston***	**4**
**E4**	**Boston***	**4**
E5	Miami	1
**Eastern Conference**
**E3**	**Atlanta**	**4**
E6	Milwaukee	3
E3	Atlanta	0
**E2**	**Orlando***	**4**
**E2**	**Orlando***	**4**
E7	Charlotte	0
**W1**	**LA Lakers***	**4**
W8	Oklahoma City	2
**W1**	**LA Lakers***	**4**
W5	Utah	0
W4	Denver*	2
**W5**	**Utah**	**4**
**Western Conference**
**W3**	**Phoenix**	**4**
W6	Portland	2
**W3**	**Phoenix**	**4**
W7	San Antonio	0
W2	Dallas*	2
**W7**	**San Antonio**	**4**

Conference Finals
**E4**	**Boston***	**4**
E2	Orlando*	2
**W1**	**LA Lakers***	**4**
W3	Phoenix	2

NBA Finals
E4	Boston*	3
**W1**	**LA Lakers***	**4**

- * Division winner
- **Bold** Series winner
- Italic Team with home-court advantage

== First round ==
All times are in Eastern Daylight Time (UTC−4)

=== Eastern Conference first round ===
==== (1) Cleveland Cavaliers vs. (8) Chicago Bulls ====
ABC

April 17
3:00 pm

Recap

Chicago Bulls 83, Cleveland Cavaliers 96
Scoring by quarter: 18–32, 23–24, 19–17, 23–23
Pts: Derrick Rose 28; Rebs: Hinrich, Noah 8 each Asts: Derrick Rose 10	Pts: LeBron James 24; Rebs: Anderson Varejão 15; Asts: Mo Williams 10
Cleveland leads series, 1–0

Quicken Loans Arena, Cleveland, Ohio
Attendance: 20,562
Referees: Eddie Rush, Bob Delaney, John Goble

TNT

April 19
8:00 pm

Recap

Chicago Bulls 102, Cleveland Cavaliers 112
Scoring by quarter: 22–28, 28–24, 27–25, 25–35
Pts: Joakim Noah 25; Rebs: Joakim Noah 13; Asts: Derrick Rose 8	Pts: LeBron James 40; Rebs: LeBron James 8 Asts: LeBron James 8
Cleveland leads series, 2–0

Quicken Loans Arena, Cleveland, Ohio
Attendance: 20,562
Referees: Joe Crawford, Ron Garretson, Eric Lewis

TNT

April 22
7:00 pm

Recap

Cleveland Cavaliers 106, Chicago Bulls 108
Scoring by quarter: 21–32, 24–24, 23–23, 38–29
Pts: LeBron James 39; Rebs: Antawn Jamison 11; Asts: LeBron James 8	Pts: Derrick Rose 31; Rebs: Joakim Noah 15; Asts: Derrick Rose 7
Cleveland leads series, 2–1

United Center, Chicago
Attendance: 22,991
Referees: Monty McCutchen, Jason Phillips, Tony Brothers

ABC

April 25
3:30 pm

Recap

Cleveland Cavaliers 121, Chicago Bulls 98
Scoring by quarter: 24–21, 38–31, 37–24, 22–22
Pts: LeBron James 37; Rebs: LeBron James 12; Asts: LeBron James 11	Pts: Noah, Rose 21 each Rebs: Joakim Noah 20; Asts: Derrick Rose 5
Cleveland leads series, 3–1

United Center, Chicago
Attendance: 22,991
Referees: Bennett Salvatore, Derrick Stafford, Mike Callahan

TNT

April 27
8:00 pm

Recap

Chicago Bulls 94, Cleveland Cavaliers 96
Scoring by quarter: 26–27, 22–28, 23–18, 23–23
Pts: Derrick Rose 31; Rebs: Taj Gibson 11; Asts: Derrick Rose 6	Pts: Antawn Jamison 25; Rebs: LeBron James 10; Asts: LeBron James 9
Cleveland wins series, 4–1

Quicken Loans Arena, Cleveland, Ohio
Attendance: 20,562
Referees: Ken Mauer, Bill Kennedy, Zach Zarba

- This is the last playoff match-up between Chicago & Cleveland until 2015.

Regular-season series
Tied 2–2 in the regular-season series

November 5, 2009

Recap

Chicago Bulls 86, Cleveland Cavaliers 85

Quicken Loans Arena, Cleveland, Ohio

December 4, 2009

Recap

Chicago Bulls 87, Cleveland Cavaliers 101

Quicken Loans Arena, Cleveland, Ohio

March 19, 2010

Recap

Cleveland Cavaliers 92, Chicago Bulls 85

United Center, Chicago, Illinois

April 8, 2010

Recap

Cleveland Cavaliers 108, Chicago Bulls 109

United Center, Chicago, Illinois

This was the sixth playoff meeting between these two teams, with the Bulls winning the first five meetings.

Previous playoff series
Chicago leads 5–0 in all-time playoff series

1988

Chicago Bulls 3, Cleveland Cavaliers 2

1988 Eastern Conference First Round

1989

Chicago Bulls 3, Cleveland Cavaliers 2

1989 Eastern Conference First Round

1992

Chicago Bulls 4, Cleveland Cavaliers 2

1992 Eastern Conference Finals

1993

Chicago Bulls 4, Cleveland Cavaliers 0

1993 Eastern Conference Semifinals

1994

Chicago Bulls 3, Cleveland Cavaliers 0

1994 Eastern Conference First Round

==== (2) Orlando Magic vs. (7) Charlotte Bobcats ====
TNT

April 18
5:30 pm

Recap

Charlotte Bobcats 89, Orlando Magic 98
Scoring by quarter: 20–31, 23–28, 23–17, 23–22
Pts: Gerald Wallace 25; Rebs: Gerald Wallace 17; Asts: Raymond Felton 4	Pts: Jameer Nelson 32; Rebs: Dwight Howard 7 Asts: Jameer Nelson 6
Orlando leads series, 1–0

Amway Arena, Orlando, Florida
Attendance: 17,461
Referees: Dan Crawford, Tony Brothers, Sean Wright

TNT

April 21
7:00 pm

Recap

Charlotte Bobcats 77, Orlando Magic 92
Scoring by quarter: 14–18, 16–23, 25–34, 22–17
Pts: Stephen Jackson 27; Rebs: Boris Diaw 7 Asts: Diaw, Felton 4 each	Pts: Vince Carter 19; Rebs: Dwight Howard 9 Asts: Jameer Nelson 5
Orlando leads series, 2–0

Amway Arena, Orlando, Florida
Attendance: 17,461
Referees: Bennett Salvatore, Rodney Mott, Bill Spooner

TNT

April 24
2:00 pm

Recap

Orlando Magic 90, Charlotte Bobcats 86
Scoring by quarter: 29–27, 12–19, 25–20, 24–20
Pts: Jameer Nelson 32; Rebs: Gortat, Howard 8 each Asts: Barnes, Howard, Lewis, Nelson 3 each	Pts: Stephen Jackson 19; Rebs: Gerald Wallace 8 Asts: Diaw, Felton 6 each
Orlando leads series, 3–0

Time Warner Cable Arena, Charlotte, North Carolina
Attendance: 19,596
Referees: Joe Crawford, Ed Malloy, Leon Wood

TNT

April 26
8:00 pm

Recap

Orlando Magic 99, Charlotte Bobcats 90
Scoring by quarter: 23–25, 20–20, 28–23, 28–22
Pts: Vince Carter 21; Rebs: Dwight Howard 13; Asts: Carter, Nelson 4 each	Pts: Tyrus Thomas 21; Rebs: Tyrus Thomas 9 Asts: Stephen Jackson 8
Orlando wins series, 4–0

Time Warner Cable Arena, Charlotte, North Carolina
Attendance: 19,086
Referees: Joe DeRosa, Sean Corbin, Marc Davis

Regular-season series
Orlando won 3–1 in the regular-season series

November 10, 2009

Recap

Orlando Magic 93, Charlotte Bobcats 81

Time Warner Cable Arena, Charlotte, North Carolina

November 16, 2009

Recap

Charlotte Bobcats 91, Orlando Magic 97

Amway Arena, Orlando, Florida

January 23, 2010

Recap

Orlando Magic 106, Charlotte Bobcats 95

Time Warner Cable Arena, Charlotte, North Carolina

March 14, 2010

Recap

Charlotte Bobcats 96, Orlando Magic 89

Amway Arena, Orlando, Florida

This was the second playoff meeting between these two teams, with the Hornets franchise winning the first meeting. Note that historical records of the original Charlotte Hornets franchise (later relocated and renamed the New Orleans Pelicans) from 1988 to 2002 are currently with the present Hornets/Bobcats franchise since the 2014–15 season.

Previous playoff series
Charlotte leads 1–0 in all-time playoff series

2002

Charlotte Hornets 3, Orlando Magic 1

2002 Eastern Conference First Round

==== (3) Atlanta Hawks vs. (6) Milwaukee Bucks ====
ESPN

April 17
5:30 pm

Recap

Milwaukee Bucks 92, Atlanta Hawks 102
Scoring by quarter: 17–34, 23–28, 30–19, 22–21
Pts: Brandon Jennings 34; Rebs: Kurt Thomas 9 Asts: Brandon Jennings 3	Pts: Joe Johnson 22; Rebs: Josh Smith 10; Asts: Joe Johnson 5
Atlanta leads series, 1–0

Philips Arena, Atlanta
Attendance: 18,729
Referees: Ken Mauer, Ron Garretson, Sean Corbin

NBA TV

April 20
7:00 pm

Recap

Milwaukee Bucks 86, Atlanta Hawks 96
Scoring by quarter: 20–28, 26–24, 16–24, 24–20
Pts: John Salmons 21; Rebs: Ersan İlyasova 15; Asts: Delfino, Salmons 4 each	Pts: Joe Johnson 27; Rebs: Josh Smith 14; Asts: Josh Smith 9
Atlanta leads series, 2–0

Philips Arena, Atlanta
Attendance: 18,938
Referees: Dan Crawford, Derrick Collins, Ed Malloy

ESPN

April 24
7:00 pm

Recap

Atlanta Hawks 89, Milwaukee Bucks 107
Scoring by quarter: 19–36, 21–16, 17–26, 32–29
Pts: Joe Johnson 25; Rebs: Josh Smith 12; Asts: Crawford, Johnson 4 each	Pts: John Salmons 22; Rebs: Kurt Thomas 13; Asts: John Salmons 10
Atlanta leads series, 2–1

Bradley Center, Milwaukee
Attendance: 18,717
Referees: Monty McCutchen, Tony Brothers, James Capers

NBA TV

April 26
8:30 pm

Recap

Atlanta Hawks 104, Milwaukee Bucks 111
Scoring by quarter: 25–28, 25–26, 24–31, 30–26
Pts: Joe Johnson 29; Rebs: Josh Smith 9 Asts: Joe Johnson 9	Pts: Brandon Jennings 23; Rebs: Kurt Thomas 9 Asts: Brandon Jennings 6
Series tied, 2–2

Bradley Center, Milwaukee
Attendance: 18,717
Referees: Eddie F. Rush, Tom Washington, Tom Goble

TNT

April 28
8:00 pm

Recap

Milwaukee Bucks 91, Atlanta Hawks 87
Scoring by quarter: 24–23, 19–23, 18–23, 30–18
Pts: Brandon Jennings 25; Rebs: Ersan İlyasova 7 Asts: John Salmons 5	Pts: Al Horford 25; Rebs: Al Horford 11; Asts: Joe Johnson 6
Milwaukee leads series, 3–2

Philips Arena, Atlanta
Attendance: 19,304
Referees: Joe DeRosa, Dick Bavetta, Marc Davis

ESPN

April 30
7:00 pm

Recap

Atlanta Hawks 83, Milwaukee Bucks 69
Scoring by quarter: 16–19, 15–15, 29–11, 23–24
Pts: Jamal Crawford 24; Rebs: Al Horford 15; Asts: Joe Johnson 6	Pts: Carlos Delfino 20; Rebs: Kurt Thomas 9 Asts: John Salmons 4
Series tied, 3–3

Bradley Center, Milwaukee
Attendance: 18,717
Referees: Bennett Salvatore, Mike Callahan, Zach Zarba

ABC

May 2
1:00 pm

Recap

Milwaukee Bucks 74, Atlanta Hawks 95
Scoring by quarter: 13–20, 27–33, 20–20, 14–22
Pts: Brandon Jennings 15; Rebs: Ersan İlyasova 11; Asts: Brandon Jennings 5	Pts: Jamal Crawford 22; Rebs: Al Horford 15; Asts: Jamal Crawford 6
Atlanta wins series, 4–3

Philips Arena, Atlanta
Attendance: 19,241
Referees: Joe Crawford, Scott Foster, Greg Willard

The Atlanta Hawks quickly took control of the series by winning the first 2 games against the Milwaukee Bucks, without star center Andrew Bogut. But the Bucks managed to take the next 3 games, including a shocking Game 5 win in Atlanta, where they overcame a 9-point deficit in the final 4 minutes. However, Atlanta managed to stave off elimination in front of a raucous Bradley Center crowd, coming away with an 83–69 Game 6 victory. The Hawks then finished off the Bucks in Game 7 and advanced to the next round.

Regular-season series
Atlanta won 2–1 in the regular-season series

February 28, 2010

Recap

Milwaukee Bucks 102, Atlanta Hawks 106

Philips Arena, Atlanta

March 22, 2010

Recap

Atlanta Hawks 95, Milwaukee Bucks 98

Bradley Center, Milwaukee

April 12, 2010

Recap

Atlanta Hawks 104, Milwaukee Bucks 96

Bradley Center, Milwaukee

This was the fourth playoff meeting between these two teams, with the Bucks winning two of the first three meetings.

Previous playoff series
Milwaukee leads 2–1 in all-time playoff series

1984

Atlanta Hawks 2, Milwaukee Bucks 3

1984 Eastern Conference First Round

1988

Atlanta Hawks 3, Milwaukee Bucks 2

1988 Eastern Conference First Round

1989

Atlanta Hawks 2, Milwaukee Bucks 3

1989 Eastern Conference First Round

- This is the most recent playoff series between the Hawks & Bucks until 2021.

==== (4) Boston Celtics vs. (5) Miami Heat ====
ESPN

April 17
8:00 pm

Recap

Miami Heat 76, Boston Celtics 85
Scoring by quarter: 29–28, 15–13, 22–23, 10–21
Pts: Dwyane Wade 26; Rebs: Jermaine O'Neal 9 Asts: Dwyane Wade 6	Pts: Paul Pierce 16; Rebs: Kevin Garnett 9 Asts: Rajon Rondo 10
Boston leads series, 1–0

TD Garden, Boston
Attendance: 18,624
Referees: Joe DeRosa, Dick Bavetta, Ed Malloy

TNT

April 20
8:00 pm

Recap

Miami Heat 77, Boston Celtics 106
Scoring by quarter: 23–23, 10–26, 26–36, 18–21
Pts: Dwyane Wade 29; Rebs: Michael Beasley 7 Asts: Dwyane Wade 5	Pts: Ray Allen 25; Rebs: Kendrick Perkins 9 Asts: Rajon Rondo 12
Boston leads series, 2–0

TD Garden, Boston
Attendance: 18,624
Referees: Eddie Rush, Bob Delaney, Marc Davis

ESPN

April 23
7:00 pm

Recap

Boston Celtics 100, Miami Heat 98
Scoring by quarter: 27–29, 21–20, 32–23, 20–26
Pts: Paul Pierce 32; Rebs: Kendrick Perkins 12; Asts: Rajon Rondo 8	Pts: Dwyane Wade 34; Rebs: Udonis Haslem 8 Asts: Dwyane Wade 8
Boston leads series, 3–0

American Airlines Arena, Miami
Attendance: 19,500
Referees: Bennett Salvatore, Eric Lewis, Bill Spooner

ABC

April 25
1:00 pm

Recap

Boston Celtics 92, Miami Heat 101
Scoring by quarter: 18–31, 25–18, 34–22, 15–30
Pts: Rajon Rondo 23; Rebs: Kevin Garnett 12; Asts: Rajon Rondo 9	Pts: Dwyane Wade 46; Rebs: Udonis Haslem 11; Asts: Wade, Chalmers 5 each
Boston leads series, 3–1

American Airlines Arena, Miami
Attendance: 19,520
Referees: Ken Mauer, Bill Kennedy, Greg Willard

NBATV

April 27
7:00 pm

Recap

Miami Heat 86, Boston Celtics 96
Scoring by quarter: 21–29, 17–19, 27–23, 21–25
Pts: Dwyane Wade 31; Rebs: Udonis Haslem 10; Asts: Dwyane Wade 10	Pts: Ray Allen 24; Rebs: Garnett, Rondo 8 each Asts: Rajon Rondo 12
Boston wins series, 4–1

TD Garden, Boston
Attendance: 18,624
Referees: Scott Foster, Derrick Stafford, James Capers

Regular-season series
Boston won 3–0 in the regular-season series

November 29, 2009

Recap

Boston Celtics 92, Miami Heat 85

American Airlines Arena, Miami

January 6, 2010

Recap

Boston Celtics 112, Miami Heat 106

American Airlines Arena, Miami

February 3, 2010

Recap

Miami Heat 102, Boston Celtics 107

TD Garden, Boston

This was the first playoff meeting between the Celtics and the Heat.

=== Western Conference first round ===
==== (1) Los Angeles Lakers vs. (8) Oklahoma City Thunder ====
ABC

April 18
3:00 pm

Recap

Oklahoma City Thunder 79, Los Angeles Lakers 87
Scoring by quarter: 13–27, 26–20, 17–17, 23–23
Pts: Kevin Durant 24; Rebs: Nick Collison 8 Asts: Russell Westbrook 8	Pts: Kobe Bryant 21; Rebs: Pau Gasol 13; Asts: Bryant, Gasol 3 each
LA Lakers lead series, 1–0

Staples Center, Los Angeles
Attendance: 18,997
Referees: Monty McCutchen, Jason Phillips, Tom Washington

TNT

April 20
10:30 pm

Recap

Oklahoma City Thunder 92, Los Angeles Lakers 95
Scoring by quarter: 18–26, 29–19, 22–28, 23–22
Pts: Kevin Durant 32; Rebs: Kevin Durant 8 Asts: Sefolosha, Westbrook 3 each	Pts: Kobe Bryant 39; Rebs: Pau Gasol 12; Asts: Derek Fisher 6
LA Lakers lead series, 2–0

Staples Center, Los Angeles
Attendance: 18,997
Referees: Derrick Stafford, Scott Foster, Zach Zarba

TNT

April 22
9:30 pm

Recap

Los Angeles Lakers 96, Oklahoma City Thunder 101
Scoring by quarter: 27–22, 23–21, 25–31, 21–27
Pts: Kobe Bryant 24; Rebs: Pau Gasol 15; Asts: Kobe Bryant 8	Pts: Kevin Durant 29; Rebs: Kevin Durant 19; Asts: Durant, Westbrook 4 each
LA Lakers lead series, 2–1

Ford Center, Oklahoma City
Attendance: 18,342
Referees: Joe Crawford, Sean Wright, Marc Davis

- This was the first playoff game at Ford Center in Oklahoma City

ESPN

April 24
9:30 pm

Recap

Los Angeles Lakers 89, Oklahoma City Thunder 110
Scoring by quarter: 17–29, 25–26, 22–31, 25–24
Pts: Bynum, Gasol 13 each Rebs: Andrew Bynum 10; Asts: Kobe Bryant 4	Pts: Kevin Durant 22; Rebs: Jeff Green 9 Asts: Russell Westbrook 6
Series tied, 2–2

Ford Center, Oklahoma City
Attendance: 18,342
Referees: Joe DeRosa, Sean Corbin, Michael Smith

TNT

April 27
10:30 pm

Recap

Oklahoma City Thunder 87, Los Angeles Lakers 111
Scoring by quarter: 16–31, 18–24, 26–33, 27–23
Pts: Kevin Durant 17; Rebs: Serge Ibaka 9 Asts: Russell Westbrook 6	Pts: Pau Gasol 25; Rebs: Bynum, Gasol 11 each Asts: Kobe Bryant 7
LA Lakers lead series, 3–2

Staples Center, Los Angeles
Attendance: 18,997
Referees: Dan Crawford, Bob Delaney, Leon Wood

ESPN

April 30
9:30 pm

Recap

Los Angeles Lakers 95, Oklahoma City Thunder 94
Scoring by quarter: 26–27, 27–20, 23–26, 19–21
Pts: Kobe Bryant 32; Rebs: Pau Gasol 18; Asts: Derek Fisher 6	Pts: Kevin Durant 26; Rebs: Nenad Krstić 11; Asts: Russell Westbrook 9
LA Lakers win series, 4–2

Ford Center, Oklahoma City
Attendance: 18,342
Referees: Ken Mauer, Bill Kennedy, Greg Willard

- Pau Gasol tip-in hits the series-winning shot after his teammate Kobe Bryant's miss.

Regular-season series
Los Angeles won 3–1 in the regular-season series

November 3, 2009

Recap

Los Angeles Lakers 101, Oklahoma City Thunder 98

Ford Center, Oklahoma City

November 22, 2009

Recap

Oklahoma City Thunder 85, Los Angeles Lakers 101

Staples Center, Los Angeles

December 22, 2009

Recap

Oklahoma City Thunder 108, Los Angeles Lakers 111

Staples Center, Los Angeles

March 26, 2010

Recap

Los Angeles Lakers 75, Oklahoma City Thunder 91

Ford Center, Oklahoma City

This was the eighth playoff meeting between these two teams, with the Lakers winning five of the first seven meetings. All previous meetings took place while the Thunder franchise were still known as the Seattle SuperSonics.

Previous playoff series
Los Angeles leads 5–2 in all-time playoff series

1978

Los Angeles Lakers 1, Seattle SuperSonics 2

1978 Western Conference First Round

1979

Los Angeles Lakers 1, Seattle SuperSonics 4

1979 Western Conference Semifinals

1980

Los Angeles Lakers 4, Seattle SuperSonics 1

1980 Western Conference Finals

1987

Los Angeles Lakers 4, Seattle SuperSonics 0

1987 Western Conference Finals

1989

Los Angeles Lakers 4, Seattle SuperSonics 0

1989 Western Conference Semifinals

1995

Los Angeles Lakers 3, Seattle SuperSonics 1

1995 Western Conference First Round

1998

Los Angeles Lakers 4, Seattle SuperSonics 1

1998 Western Conference Semifinals

==== (2) Dallas Mavericks vs. (7) San Antonio Spurs ====
TNT

April 18
8:00 pm

Recap

San Antonio Spurs 94, Dallas Mavericks 100
Scoring by quarter: 18–23, 27–27, 24–26, 25–24
Pts: Tim Duncan 27; Rebs: Duncan, McDyess 8 each Asts: Manu Ginóbili 6	Pts: Dirk Nowitzki 36; Rebs: Erick Dampier 12; Asts: Jason Kidd 11
Dallas leads series, 1–0

American Airlines Center, Dallas
Attendance: 20,372
Referees: Bennett Salvatore, Michael Smith, Bill Kennedy

TNT

April 21
9:30 pm

Recap

San Antonio Spurs 102, Dallas Mavericks 88
Scoring by quarter: 24–20, 34–26, 24–26, 20–16
Pts: Tim Duncan 25; Rebs: Tim Duncan 17; Asts: Tony Parker 8	Pts: Jason Terry 27; Rebs: Dirk Nowitzki 10; Asts: Jason Kidd 8
Series tied, 1–1

American Airlines Center, Dallas
Attendance: 20,728
Referees: Ken Mauer, James Capers, Mike Callahan

ESPN

April 23
9:30 pm

Recap

Dallas Mavericks 90, San Antonio Spurs 94
Scoring by quarter: 16–23, 28–24, 26–19, 20–28
Pts: Dirk Nowitzki 35; Rebs: Kidd, Nowitzki 7 each Asts: Jason Kidd 5	Pts: Tim Duncan 25; Rebs: Antonio McDyess 6 Asts: Manu Ginóbili 7
San Antonio leads series, 2–1

AT&T Center, San Antonio
Attendance: 18,581
Referees: Dick Bavetta, Dan Crawford, Rodney Mott

TNT

April 25
7:00 pm

Recap

Dallas Mavericks 89, San Antonio Spurs 92
Scoring by quarter: 17–20, 31–17, 11–29, 30–26
Pts: Butler, Nowitzki 17 each Rebs: Dirk Nowitzki 11; Asts: Jason Kidd 5	Pts: George Hill 29; Rebs: Tim Duncan 11; Asts: Manu Ginóbili 7
San Antonio leads series, 3–1

AT&T Center, San Antonio
Attendance: 18,581
Referees: Bob Delaney, David Jones, Scott Foster

NBATV

April 27
9:30 pm

Recap

San Antonio Spurs 81, Dallas Mavericks 103
Scoring by quarter: 21–27, 25–26, 18–29, 17–21
Pts: Tony Parker 18; Rebs: DeJuan Blair 8 Asts: Tony Parker 6	Pts: Caron Butler 35; Rebs: Caron Butler 11; Asts: Jason Kidd 7
San Antonio leads series, 3–2

American Airlines Center, Dallas
Attendance: 20,728
Referees: Monty McCutchen, Pat Fraher, Greg Willard

TNT

April 29
8:00 pm

Recap

Dallas Mavericks 87, San Antonio Spurs 97
Scoring by quarter: 8–22, 26–25, 29–23, 24–27
Pts: Dirk Nowitzki 33; Rebs: Jason Kidd 8 Asts: Jason Kidd 6	Pts: Manu Ginóbili 26; Rebs: Tim Duncan 10; Asts: Tony Parker 8
San Antonio wins series, 4–2

AT&T Center, San Antonio
Attendance: 18,581
Referees: Eddie F. Rush, Bill Spooner, Tom Washington

The Mavs won 55 games and the Southwest Division title, but for the 3rd time in four years, they failed to escape the first round. The 2007 Mavericks were defeated by the Golden State Warriors as a No. 1 seed, and the 2008 Mavericks lost in the 1st round to the New Orleans Hornets. The Mavs took Game 1 in Dallas, but would go on to drop the next three games (including two in San Antonio) to wind up trailing 3 to 1. Dallas won Game 5 to keep their season alive, but the Spurs managed to finish them off with a 10-point win in Game 6.

- This is the last playoff match-up between Dallas & San Antonio until 2014.

Regular-season series
Dallas won 3–1 in the regular-season series

November 11, 2009

Recap

Dallas Mavericks 83, San Antonio Spurs 92

AT&T Center, San Antonio

November 18, 2009

Recap

San Antonio Spurs 94, Dallas Mavericks 99

American Airlines Center, Dallas

January 8, 2010

Recap

Dallas Mavericks 112, San Antonio Spurs 103

AT&T Center, San Antonio

April 14, 2010

Recap

San Antonio Spurs 89, Dallas Mavericks 96

American Airlines Center, Dallas

This was the fifth playoff meeting between these two teams, with each team winning two series apiece.

Previous playoff series
Tied 2–2 in all-time playoff series

2001

Dallas Mavericks 1, San Antonio Spurs 4

2001 Western Conference Semifinals

2003

Dallas Mavericks 2, San Antonio Spurs 4

2003 Western Conference Finals

2006

Dallas Mavericks 4, San Antonio Spurs 3

2006 Western Conference Semifinals

2009

Dallas Mavericks 4, San Antonio Spurs 1

2009 Western Conference First Round

==== (3) Phoenix Suns vs. (6) Portland Trail Blazers ====
TNT

April 18
10:30 pm

Recap

Portland Trail Blazers 105, Phoenix Suns 100
Scoring by quarter: 25–24, 19–19, 26–29, 35–28
Pts: Andre Miller 31; Rebs: Marcus Camby 17; Asts: Andre Miller 8	Pts: Steve Nash 25; Rebs: Jason Richardson 10; Asts: Steve Nash 9
Portland leads series, 1–0

US Airways Center, Phoenix, Arizona
Attendance: 18,422
Referees: Scott Foster, James Capers, Derrick Stafford

NBATV

April 20
10:00 pm

Recap

Portland Trail Blazers 90, Phoenix Suns 119
Scoring by quarter: 26–32, 23–31, 19–31, 22–25
Pts: Martell Webster 16; Rebs: Marcus Camby 10; Asts: Andre Miller 3	Pts: Jason Richardson 29; Rebs: Grant Hill 8 Asts: Steve Nash 16
Series tied, 1–1

US Airways Center, Phoenix, Arizona
Attendance: 18.422
Referees: Monty McCutchen, Tom Washington, Greg Willard

NBATV

April 22
10:00 pm

Recap

Phoenix Suns 108, Portland Trail Blazers 89
Scoring by quarter: 34–16, 32–21, 15–23, 27–29
Pts: Jason Richardson 42; Rebs: Jason Richardson 8 Asts: Steve Nash 10	Pts: LaMarcus Aldridge 17; Rebs: Marcus Camby 10; Asts: Andre Miller 9
Phoenix leads series, 2–1

Rose Garden, Portland, Oregon
Attendance: 20,271
Referees: Joe DeRosa, Pat Fraher, Bill Kennedy

TNT

April 24
4:30 pm

Recap

Phoenix Suns 87, Portland Trail Blazers 96
Scoring by quarter: 27–26, 23–28, 22–20, 15–22
Pts: Amar'e Stoudemire 26; Rebs: Grant Hill 12; Asts: Steve Nash 8	Pts: LaMarcus Aldridge 31; Rebs: LaMarcus Aldridge 11; Asts: Andre Miller 8
Series tied, 2–2

Rose Garden, Portland, Oregon
Attendance: 20,151
Referees: Eddie F. Rush, Derrick Collins, Ron Garretson

TNT

April 26
10:30 pm

Recap

Portland Trail Blazers 88, Phoenix Suns 107
Scoring by quarter: 28–27, 19–30, 19–27, 22–23
Pts: Andre Miller 21; Rebs: Marcus Camby 11; Asts: Marcus Camby 5	Pts: Channing Frye 20; Rebs: Frye, Richardson 8 each Asts: Steve Nash 10
Phoenix leads series, 3–2

US Airways Center, Phoenix, Arizona
Attendance: 18,422
Referees: Joe Crawford, Jason Phillips, Bill Spooner

TNT

April 29
10:30 pm

Recap

Phoenix Suns 99, Portland Trail Blazers 90
Scoring by quarter: 24–17, 29–24, 21–24, 25–25
Pts: Jason Richardson 28; Rebs: Grant Hill 12; Asts: Steve Nash 6	Pts: Martell Webster 19; Rebs: LaMarcus Aldridge 9 Asts: Jerryd Bayless 7
Phoenix wins series, 4–2

Rose Garden, Portland, Oregon
Attendance: 20,313
Referees: Sean Corbin, Bob Delaney, Dan Crawford

Regular-season series
Portland won 2–1 in the regular-season series

December 17, 2009

Recap

Phoenix Suns 102, Portland Trail Blazers 105

Rose Garden, Portland, Oregon

February 10, 2010

Recap

Portland Trail Blazers 108, Phoenix Suns 101

US Airways Center, Phoenix, Arizona

March 21, 2010

Recap

Portland Trail Blazers 87, Phoenix Suns 93

US Airways Center, Phoenix, Arizona

This was the seventh playoff meeting between these two teams, with each team winning three series apiece.

Previous playoff series
Tied 3–3 in all-time playoff series

1979

Phoenix Suns 2, Portland Trail Blazers 1

1979 Western Conference First Round

1984

Phoenix Suns 3, Portland Trail Blazers 2

1984 Western Conference First Round

1990

Phoenix Suns 2, Portland Trail Blazers 4

1990 Western Conference Finals

1992

Phoenix Suns 1, Portland Trail Blazers 4

1992 Western Conference Semifinals

1995

Phoenix Suns 3, Portland Trail Blazers 0

1995 Western Conference First Round

1999

Phoenix Suns 0, Portland Trail Blazers 3

1999 Western Conference First Round

==== (4) Denver Nuggets vs. (5) Utah Jazz ====
ESPN

April 17
10:30 pm

Recap

Utah Jazz 113, Denver Nuggets 126
Scoring by quarter: 28–30, 28–27, 30–31, 27–38
Pts: Deron Williams 26; Rebs: Paul Millsap 10; Asts: Deron Williams 11	Pts: Carmelo Anthony 42; Rebs: Kenyon Martin 12; Asts: Chauncey Billups 8
Denver leads series, 1–0

Pepsi Center, Denver, Colorado
Attendance: 19,155
Referees: Joe Crawford, Greg Willard, Zach Zarba

TNT

April 19
10:30 pm

Recap

Utah Jazz 114, Denver Nuggets 111
Scoring by quarter: 33–30, 30–21, 25–31, 26–29
Pts: Deron Williams 33; Rebs: Carlos Boozer 14; Asts: Deron Williams 14	Pts: Carmelo Anthony 32; Rebs: Anthony, Nenê, Smith 6 each Asts: Chauncey Billups 11
Series tied, 1–1

Pepsi Center, Denver, Colorado
Attendance: 19,155
Referees: Ken Mauer, Bill Spooner, Leon Wood

ESPN2

April 23
10:30 pm

Recap

Denver Nuggets 93, Utah Jazz 105
Scoring by quarter: 27–21, 21–31, 20–32, 25–21
Pts: Anthony, Billups 25 each Rebs: Kenyon Martin 13; Asts: Billups, Carter 3 each	Pts: Deron Williams 24; Rebs: Paul Millsap 19; Asts: Deron Williams 10
Utah leads series, 2–1

EnergySolutions Arena, Salt Lake City
Attendance: 19,911
Referees: David Jones, Mike Callahan, Scott Foster

TNT

April 25
9:30 pm

Recap

Denver Nuggets 106, Utah Jazz 117
Scoring by quarter: 25–31, 20–23, 23–32, 38–31
Pts: Carmelo Anthony 39; Rebs: Anthony, Nenê 11 each Asts: Chauncey Billups 4	Pts: Carlos Boozer 31; Rebs: Carlos Boozer 13; Asts: Deron Williams 13
Utah leads series, 3–1

EnergySolutions Arena, Salt Lake City
Attendance: 19,911
Referees: Dan Crawford, Dick Bavetta, Pat Fraher

TNT

April 28
10:30 pm

Recap

Utah Jazz 102, Denver Nuggets 116
Scoring by quarter: 27–25, 25–25, 29–36, 21–30
Pts: Deron Williams 34; Rebs: Carlos Boozer 16; Asts: Deron Williams 10	Pts: Carmelo Anthony 26; Rebs: Carmelo Anthony 11; Asts: Billups, Nenê 4 each
Utah leads series, 3–2

Pepsi Center, Denver, Colorado
Attendance: 19,155
Referees: Bennett Salvatore, Ron Garretson, Ed Malloy

ESPN2

April 30
10:00 pm

Recap

Denver Nuggets 104, Utah Jazz 112
Scoring by quarter: 23–32, 31–24, 26–27, 24–29
Pts: Chauncey Billups 30; Rebs: Carmelo Anthony 12; Asts: Chauncey Billups 8	Pts: Wesley Matthews 23; Rebs: Carlos Boozer 20; Asts: Deron Williams 10
Utah wins series, 4–2

EnergySolutions Arena, Salt Lake City
Attendance: 19,911
Referees: Joe DeRosa, Marc Davis, Derrick Stafford

- Game 6 is Carmelo Anthony's final playoff game with the Nuggets before being traded to the New York Knicks shortly before the trade deadline.
- This is the last playoff match-up between Utah & Denver until 2020.

Regular-season series
Denver won 3–1 in the regular-season series

October 28, 2009

Recap

Utah Jazz 105, Denver Nuggets 114

Pepsi Center, Denver, Colorado

January 2, 2010

Recap

Denver Nuggets 105, Utah Jazz 95

EnergySolutions Arena, Salt Lake City

January 17, 2010

Recap

Utah Jazz 112, Denver Nuggets 119

Pepsi Center, Denver, Colorado

February 6, 2010

Recap

Denver Nuggets 106, Utah Jazz 116

EnergySolutions Arena, Salt Lake City

This was the fourth playoff meeting between these two teams, with the Jazz winning two of the first three meetings.

Previous playoff series
Utah leads 2–1 in all-time playoff series

1984

Denver Nuggets 2, Utah Jazz 3

1984 Western Conference First Round

1985

Denver Nuggets 4, Utah Jazz 1

1985 Western Conference Semifinals

1994

Denver Nuggets 3, Utah Jazz 4

1994 Western Conference Semifinals

== Conference semifinals ==
=== Eastern Conference semifinals ===
==== (1) Cleveland Cavaliers vs. (4) Boston Celtics ====
TNT

May 1
8:00 pm

Recap

Boston Celtics 93, Cleveland Cavaliers 101
Scoring by quarter: 26–20, 28–23, 24–36, 15–22
Pts: Rajon Rondo 27; Rebs: Kendrick Perkins 11; Asts: Rajon Rondo 12	Pts: LeBron James 35; Rebs: Antawn Jamison 9 Asts: LeBron James 7
Cleveland leads series, 1–0

Quicken Loans Arena, Cleveland, Ohio
Attendance: 20,562
Referees: Eddie F. Rush, Bill Spooner, Jason Phillips

TNT

May 3
8:00 pm

Recap

Boston Celtics 104, Cleveland Cavaliers 86
Scoring by quarter: 26–22, 26–26, 31–12, 21–26
Pts: Ray Allen 22; Rebs: Kevin Garnett 10; Asts: Rajon Rondo 19	Pts: LeBron James 24; Rebs: James, Varejão 7 each Asts: Mo Williams 7
Series tied, 1–1

Quicken Loans Arena, Cleveland, Ohio
Attendance: 20,562
Referees: Dan Crawford, Dick Bavetta, Ed Malloy

ESPN

May 7
7:00 pm

Recap

Cleveland Cavaliers 124, Boston Celtics 95
Scoring by quarter: 36–17, 29–26, 31–27, 28–25
Pts: LeBron James 38; Rebs: Antawn Jamison 12; Asts: James, Williams 7 each	Pts: Kevin Garnett 19; Rebs: Rajon Rondo 5 Asts: Rajon Rondo 8
Cleveland leads series, 2–1

TD Garden, Boston
Attendance: 18,624
Referees: Bennett Salvatore, Ken Mauer, Zach Zarba

ABC

May 9
3:30 pm

Recap

Cleveland Cavaliers 87, Boston Celtics 97
Scoring by quarter: 22–31, 23–23, 27–20, 15–23
Pts: LeBron James 22; Rebs: LeBron James 9 Asts: LeBron James 8	Pts: Rajon Rondo 29; Rebs: Rajon Rondo 18; Asts: Rajon Rondo 13
Series tied, 2–2

TD Garden, Boston
Attendance: 18,624
Referees: Joe DeRosa, Mike Callahan, Michael Smith

TNT

May 11
8:00 pm

Recap

Boston Celtics 120, Cleveland Cavaliers 88
Scoring by quarter: 20–23, 30–21, 30–19, 40–25
Pts: Ray Allen 25; Rebs: Paul Pierce 11; Asts: Rondo, Pierce 7 each	Pts: Shaquille O'Neal 21; Rebs: Anderson Varejão 8 Asts: LeBron James 7
Boston leads series, 3–2

Quicken Loans Arena, Cleveland, Ohio
Attendance: 20,562
Referees: Joe Crawford, Marc Davis, Greg Willard

ESPN

May 13
8:00 pm

Recap

Cleveland Cavaliers 85, Boston Celtics 94
Scoring by quarter: 22–25, 27–26, 18–25, 18–18
Pts: LeBron James 27; Rebs: LeBron James 19; Asts: LeBron James 10	Pts: Kevin Garnett 22; Rebs: Kevin Garnett 12; Asts: Rajon Rondo 12
Boston wins series, 4–2

TD Garden, Boston
Attendance: 18,624
Referees: Monty McCutchen, Bob Delaney, Eddie F. Rush

The Cavaliers were considered heavy favorites coming in but had to rally from an 11-point halftime deficit to win Game 1. The Celtics took home-court in Game 2, as Celtics point guard Rajon Rondo's 19 assists powered them past the Cavaliers to an 18-point victory. The Cavaliers struck back in Game 3 and handed the Celtics their worst home-playoff loss in franchise history. Cavaliers forward LeBron James scored 21 points in the first quarter alone and 38 for the game. Antawn Jamison added another 20. Celtics forward Paul Pierce called the loss "embarrassing". Rondo's triple-double (29 points, a career playoff high 18 rebounds and 13 assists) pushed the Celtics to a Game 4 victory. The Celtics reciprocated their Game 3 humiliation with a 32-point victory in Cleveland during Game 5. LeBron James was held to 3 of 14 shooting. The Celtics clinched the series in Game 6, holding James to 8 of 21 shooting.

The Cavaliers early exit led to James' departure for the Miami Heat during the offseason. Cavaliers owner Dan Gilbert then accused James of quitting on the team during the series and also alleged that he did the same thing the previous year's Conference Finals. The Cavaliers did not make the playoffs again until the 2014–2015 NBA season (James' first season back in Cleveland), and in fact, they would be the first team Byron Scott failed to take to the playoffs during his tenure as head coach; he had led his two previous teams to the playoffs at least once.

Regular-season series
Tied 2–2 in the regular-season series

October 27, 2009

Recap

Boston Celtics 95, Cleveland Cavaliers 89

Quicken Loans Arena, Cleveland, Ohio

February 25, 2010

Recap

Cleveland Cavaliers 108, Boston Celtics 88

TD Garden, Boston

March 14, 2010

Recap

Boston Celtics 93, Cleveland Cavaliers 104

Quicken Loans Arena, Cleveland, Ohio

April 4, 2010

Recap

Cleveland Cavaliers 113, Boston Celtics 117

TD Garden, Boston

This was the fifth playoff meeting between these two teams, with the Celtics winning three of the first four meetings.

Previous playoff series
Boston leads 3–1 in all-time playoff series

1976

Boston Celtics 4, Cleveland Cavaliers 2

1976 Eastern Conference Finals

1985

Boston Celtics 3, Cleveland Cavaliers 1

1985 Eastern Conference First Round

1992

Boston Celtics 3, Cleveland Cavaliers 4

1992 Eastern Conference Semifinals

2008

Boston Celtics 4, Cleveland Cavaliers 3

2008 Eastern Conference Semifinals

==== (2) Orlando Magic vs. (3) Atlanta Hawks ====
TNT

May 4
8:00 pm

Recap

Atlanta Hawks 71, Orlando Magic 114
Scoring by quarter: 23–25, 10–28, 11–32, 27–29
Pts: Josh Smith 14; Rebs: Johnson, Pachulia 7 each Asts: Bibby, Johnson 3 each	Pts: Dwight Howard 21; Rebs: Dwight Howard 12; Asts: Jameer Nelson 5
Orlando leads series, 1–0

Amway Arena, Orlando, Florida
Attendance: 17,461
Referees: Joe DeRosa, Bob Delaney, Tom Washington

ESPN

May 6
8:00 pm

Recap

Atlanta Hawks 98, Orlando Magic 112
Scoring by quarter: 27–32, 30–17, 26–35, 15–28
Pts: Al Horford 24; Rebs: Marvin Williams 11; Asts: Joe Johnson 5	Pts: Dwight Howard 29; Rebs: Dwight Howard 17; Asts: Lewis, Nelson 6 each
Orlando leads series, 2–0

Amway Arena, Orlando, Florida
Attendance: 17,461
Referees: Monty McCutchen, Mike Callahan, Marc Davis

ESPN

May 8
5:00 pm

Recap

Orlando Magic 105, Atlanta Hawks 75
Scoring by quarter: 28–18, 24–15, 27–22, 26–20
Pts: Rashard Lewis 22; Rebs: Dwight Howard 16; Asts: Jameer Nelson 4	Pts: Jamal Crawford 22; Rebs: Josh Smith 11; Asts: Al Horford 3
Orlando leads series, 3–0

Philips Arena, Atlanta
Attendance: 18,729
Referees: Ed Malloy, Dan Crawford, Eddie F. Rush

TNT

May 10
8:00 pm

Recap

Orlando Magic 98, Atlanta Hawks 84
Scoring by quarter: 34–23, 19–22, 22–21, 23–18
Pts: Vince Carter 22; Rebs: Anderson, Howard 8 each Asts: Jameer Nelson 9	Pts: Jamal Crawford 18; Rebs: Josh Smith 8 Asts: Joe Johnson 5
Orlando wins series, 4–0

Philips Arena, Atlanta
Attendance: 18,729
Referees: Bennett Salvatore, Bill Spooner, Derrick Stafford

The Magic's victory was the most lopsided four-game sweep in playoff history.

Regular-season series
Orlando won 3–1 in the regular-season series

November 26, 2009

Recap

Orlando Magic 93, Atlanta Hawks 76

Philips Arena, Atlanta

January 9, 2010

Recap

Atlanta Hawks 81, Orlando Magic 113

Amway Arena, Orlando, Florida

January 30, 2010

Recap

Atlanta Hawks 86, Orlando Magic 104

Amway Arena, Orlando, Florida

March 24, 2010

Recap

Orlando Magic 84, Atlanta Hawks 86

Philips Arena, Atlanta

This was the second playoff meeting between these two teams, with the Magic winning the first meeting.

Previous playoff series
Orlando leads 1–0 in all-time playoff series

1996

Atlanta Hawks 1, Orlando Magic 4

1996 Eastern Conference Semifinals

=== Western Conference semifinals ===
==== (1) Los Angeles Lakers vs. (5) Utah Jazz ====
ABC

May 2
3:30 pm

Recap

Utah Jazz 99, Los Angeles Lakers 104
Scoring by quarter: 23–30, 22–23, 28–28, 26–23
Pts: Deron Williams 24; Rebs: Carlos Boozer 12; Asts: Deron Williams 8	Pts: Kobe Bryant 31; Rebs: Gasol, Odom 12 each Asts: Bryant, Gasol 4 each
LA Lakers lead series, 1–0

Staples Center, Los Angeles
Attendance: 18,997
Referees: Monty McCutchen, Mike Callahan, James Capers

TNT

May 4
10:30 pm

Recap

Utah Jazz 103, Los Angeles Lakers 111
Scoring by quarter: 23–27, 23–31, 31–29, 26–24
Pts: Paul Millsap 26; Rebs: Carlos Boozer 12; Asts: Deron Williams 9	Pts: Kobe Bryant 30; Rebs: Gasol, Odom 15 each Asts: Kobe Bryant 8
LA Lakers lead series, 2–0

Staples Center, Los Angeles
Attendance: 18,997
Referees: Scott Foster, Tony Brothers, Sean Corbin

ABC

May 8
8:00 pm

Recap

Los Angeles Lakers 111, Utah Jazz 110
Scoring by quarter: 17–22, 33–32, 32–26, 29–30
Pts: Kobe Bryant 35; Rebs: Pau Gasol 17; Asts: Kobe Bryant 7	Pts: Deron Williams 28; Rebs: Carlos Boozer 14; Asts: Deron Williams 9
LA Lakers lead series, 3–0

EnergySolutions Arena, Salt Lake City
Attendance: 19,911
Referees: Joe Crawford, Dick Bavetta, Greg Willard

TNT

May 10
10:30 pm

Recap

Los Angeles Lakers 111, Utah Jazz 96
Scoring by quarter: 29–24, 29–17, 22–26, 31–29
Pts: Pau Gasol 33; Rebs: Pau Gasol 14; Asts: Kobe Bryant 4	Pts: Millsap, Williams 21 each Rebs: Carlos Boozer 14; Asts: Deron Williams 9
LA Lakers win series, 4–0

EnergySolutions Arena, Salt Lake City
Attendance: 19,911
Referees: Dan Crawford, Bill Kennedy, Tom Washington

- Game 4 is Jerry Sloan's final playoff game as head coach of the Utah Jazz before he resigned following the 2010–2011 season.

Regular-season series
Los Angeles won 3–1 in the regular-season series

December 9, 2009

Recap

Utah Jazz 77, Los Angeles Lakers 101

Staples Center, Los Angeles

December 12, 2009

Recap

Los Angeles Lakers 94, Utah Jazz 102

EnergySolutions Arena, Salt Lake City

February 10, 2010

Recap

Los Angeles Lakers 96, Utah Jazz 81

EnergySolutions Arena, Salt Lake City

April 2, 2010

Recap

Utah Jazz 92, Los Angeles Lakers 106

Staples Center, Los Angeles

This was the sixth playoff meeting between these two teams, with the Lakers winning three of the first five meetings.

Previous playoff series
Los Angeles leads 3–2 in all-time playoff series

1988

Los Angeles Lakers 4, Utah Jazz 3

1988 Western Conference Semifinals

1997

Los Angeles Lakers 1, Utah Jazz 4

1997 Western Conference Semifinals

1998

Los Angeles Lakers 0, Utah Jazz 4

1998 Western Conference Finals

2008

Los Angeles Lakers 4, Utah Jazz 2

2008 Western Conference Semifinals

2009

Los Angeles Lakers 4, Utah Jazz 1

2009 Western Conference First Round

==== (3) Phoenix Suns vs. (7) San Antonio Spurs ====
TNT

May 3
10:30 pm

Recap

San Antonio Spurs 102, Phoenix Suns 111
Scoring by quarter: 22–31, 25–26, 28–28, 27–26
Pts: Manu Ginóbili 27; Rebs: Tim Duncan 11; Asts: Manu Ginóbili 5	Pts: Steve Nash 33; Rebs: Amar'e Stoudemire 13; Asts: Steve Nash 10
Phoenix leads series, 1–0

US Airways Center, Phoenix, Arizona
Attendance: 18,422
Referees: Bennett Salvatore, Ken Mauer, Michael Smith

TNT

May 5
9:00 pm

Recap

San Antonio Spurs 102, Phoenix Suns 110
Scoring by quarter: 30–21, 21–30, 25–27, 26–32
Pts: Tim Duncan 29; Rebs: Duncan, Jefferson 10 each Asts: Manu Ginóbili 11	Pts: Amar'e Stoudemire 23; Rebs: Amar'e Stoudemire 11; Asts: Steve Nash 6
Phoenix leads series, 2–0

US Airways Center, Phoenix, Arizona
Attendance: 18,422
Referees: Joe Crawford, Ron Garretson, Derrick Stafford

ESPN

May 7
9:30 pm

Recap

Phoenix Suns 110, San Antonio Spurs 96
Scoring by quarter: 19–28, 25–22, 27–22, 39–24
Pts: Goran Dragić 26; Rebs: Nash, Stoudemire 8 each Asts: Steve Nash 6	Pts: Manu Ginóbili 27; Rebs: Tim Duncan 13; Asts: Ginóbili, Parker 5 each
Phoenix leads series, 3–0

AT&T Center, San Antonio
Attendance: 18,581
Referees: Scott Foster, James Capers, Bill Kennedy

TNT

May 9
8:00 pm

Recap

Phoenix Suns 107, San Antonio Spurs 101
Scoring by quarter: 19–25, 31–22, 22–24, 35–30
Pts: Amar'e Stoudemire 29; Rebs: Jason Richardson 8 Asts: Steve Nash 9	Pts: Tony Parker 22; Rebs: Duncan, Jefferson 8 each Asts: Manu Ginóbili 9
Phoenix wins series, 4–0

AT&T Center, San Antonio
Attendance: 18,581
Referees: Monty McCutchen, Bob Delaney, Jason Phillips

Regular-season series
Phoenix won 2–1 in the regular-season series

December 15, 2009

Recap

San Antonio Spurs 104, Phoenix Suns 116

US Airways Center, Phoenix, Arizona

February 28, 2010

Recap

Phoenix Suns 110, San Antonio Spurs 113

AT&T Center, San Antonio

April 7, 2010

Recap

San Antonio Spurs 101, Phoenix Suns 112

US Airways Center, Phoenix, Arizona

This was the tenth playoff meeting between these two teams, with the Spurs winning six of the first nine meetings.

Previous playoff series
San Antonio leads 6–3 in all-time playoff series

1992

Phoenix Suns 3, San Antonio Spurs 0

1992 Western Conference First Round

1993

Phoenix Suns 4, San Antonio Spurs 2

1993 Western Conference Semifinals

1996

Phoenix Suns 1, San Antonio Spurs 3

1996 Western Conference First Round

1998

Phoenix Suns 1, San Antonio Spurs 3

1998 Western Conference First Round

2000

Phoenix Suns 3, San Antonio Spurs 1

2000 Western Conference First Round

2003

Phoenix Suns 2, San Antonio Spurs 4

2003 Western Conference First Round

2005

Phoenix Suns 1, San Antonio Spurs 4

2005 Western Conference Finals

2007

Phoenix Suns 2, San Antonio Spurs 4

2007 Western Conference Semifinals

2008

Phoenix Suns 1, San Antonio Spurs 4

2008 Western Conference First Round

== Conference finals ==
=== Eastern Conference finals ===
==== (2) Orlando Magic vs. (4) Boston Celtics ====
ABC

May 16
3:30 pm

Recap

Boston Celtics 92, Orlando Magic 88
Scoring by quarter: 22–14, 19–18, 33–26, 18–30
Pts: Ray Allen 25; Rebs: Kevin Garnett 11; Asts: Rajon Rondo 8	Pts: Vince Carter 23; Rebs: Dwight Howard 12; Asts: Carter, Howard, Lewis, Nelson 2 each
Boston leads series, 1–0

Amway Arena, Orlando, Florida
Attendance: 17,461
Referees: Dan Crawford, Ken Mauer, Michael Smith

ESPN

May 18
8:30 pm

Recap

Boston Celtics 95, Orlando Magic 92
Scoring by quarter: 27–28, 26–23, 25–19, 17–22
Pts: Paul Pierce 28; Rebs: Kevin Garnett 9 Asts: Rajon Rondo 8	Pts: Dwight Howard 30; Rebs: Dwight Howard 8 Asts: Lewis, Nelson, Redick 4 each
Boston leads series, 2–0

Amway Arena, Orlando, Florida
Attendance: 17,461
Referees: Joe DeRosa, Marc Davis, Bill Kennedy

ESPN

May 22
8:30 pm

Recap

Orlando Magic 71, Boston Celtics 94
Scoring by quarter: 12–27, 22–24, 13–24, 24–19
Pts: Carter, Nelson 15 each Rebs: Dwight Howard 7 Asts: Barnes, Carter, Redick 2 each	Pts: Glen Davis 17; Rebs: Paul Pierce 9 Asts: Rajon Rondo 12
Boston leads series, 3–0

TD Garden, Boston
Attendance: 18,624
Referees: Bennett Salvatore, Bill Spooner, Greg Willard

ESPN

May 24
8:30 pm

Recap

Orlando Magic 96, Boston Celtics 92 (OT)
Scoring by quarter: 31–26, 20–21, 16–21, 19–18, Overtime: 10–6
Pts: Dwight Howard 32; Rebs: Dwight Howard 16; Asts: Jameer Nelson 9	Pts: Paul Pierce 32; Rebs: Kevin Garnett 12; Asts: Rajon Rondo 8
Boston leads series, 3–1

TD Garden, Boston
Attendance: 18,624
Referees: Scott Foster, Bob Delaney, Derrick Stafford

ESPN

May 26
8:30 pm

Recap

Boston Celtics 92, Orlando Magic 113
Scoring by quarter: 27–31, 22–26, 26–27, 17–29
Pts: Rasheed Wallace 21; Rebs: Kevin Garnett 5 Asts: Ray Allen 7	Pts: Jameer Nelson 24; Rebs: Dwight Howard 10; Asts: Nelson, Williams 5 each
Boston leads series, 3–2

Amway Arena, Orlando, Florida
Attendance: 17,461
Referees: Joe Crawford, Eddie F. Rush, Tom Washington

ESPN

May 28
8:30 pm

Recap

Orlando Magic 84, Boston Celtics 96
Scoring by quarter: 19–30, 23–25, 19–27, 23–14
Pts: Dwight Howard 28; Rebs: Dwight Howard 12; Asts: Jameer Nelson 4	Pts: Paul Pierce 31; Rebs: Paul Pierce 13; Asts: Rajon Rondo 6
Boston wins series, 4–2

TD Garden, Boston
Attendance: 18,624
Referees: Monty McCutchen, Mike Callahan, Ken Mauer

The Boston Celtics were able to hold off a late Magic rally to steal home-court advantage in Game 1. They even used that momentum to grab Game 2 in Orlando to take a 2–0 lead going into Boston. After winning back-to-back road games to begin a series for the first time in franchise history, the Celtics would go on to blow out the Magic by 23 points in Game 3 to take a 3 to nothing lead. The Magic, however, would rally for a desperate Game 4 victory in overtime to force Game 5 in Orlando. Dwight Howard poured in 32 points in that victory. The Celtics seemed to lose control of the series, as the Magic scored another victory in Game 5, making the series 3–2, to force it back to Boston. Boston fans began to become anxious, especially after recently seeing the NHL's Boston Bruins lose their playoff series against the Philadelphia Flyers even though the Bruins had a 3–0 lead initially. No team in NBA history has rallied from a 3–0 deficit to win a post-season series. However, Orlando fell short as the Celtics were able to advance to the NBA Finals for the second time in three years with a 12-point win in Game 6.

Regular-season series
Orlando won 3–1 in the regular-season series

November 20, 2009

Recap

Orlando Magic 83, Boston Celtics 78

TD Garden, Boston

December 25, 2009

Recap

Boston Celtics 86, Orlando Magic 77

Amway Arena, Orlando, Florida

January 28, 2010

Recap

Boston Celtics 94, Orlando Magic 96

Amway Arena, Orlando, Florida

February 7, 2010

Recap

Orlando Magic 96, Boston Celtics 89

TD Garden, Boston

This was the third playoff meeting between these two teams, with the Magic winning the first two meetings.

Previous playoff series
Orlando leads 2–0 in all-time playoff series

1995

Boston Celtics 1, Orlando Magic 3

1995 Eastern Conference First Round

2009

Boston Celtics 3, Orlando Magic 4

2009 Eastern Conference Semifinals

- This is the most recent playoff series between the Celtics & Magic until 2025.

=== Western Conference finals ===
==== (1) Los Angeles Lakers vs. (3) Phoenix Suns ====
TNT

May 17
9:00 pm

Recap

Phoenix Suns 107, Los Angeles Lakers 128
Scoring by quarter: 26–35, 29–27, 24–31, 28–35
Pts: Amar'e Stoudemire 23; Rebs: Amundson, Lopez, Richardson 6 each Asts: Steve Nash 13	Pts: Kobe Bryant 40; Rebs: Lamar Odom 19; Asts: Artest, Bryant, Farmar, Gasol 5 each
LA Lakers lead series, 1–0

Staples Center, Los Angeles
Attendance: 18,997
Referees: Scott Foster, Jason Phillips, Greg Willard

TNT

May 19
9:00 pm

Recap

Phoenix Suns 112, Los Angeles Lakers 124
Scoring by quarter: 24–36, 32–29, 34–25, 22–34
Pts: Jason Richardson 27; Rebs: Lopez, Stoudemire 6 each Asts: Steve Nash 15	Pts: Pau Gasol 29; Rebs: Lamar Odom 11; Asts: Kobe Bryant 13
LA Lakers lead series, 2–0

Staples Center, Los Angeles
Attendance: 18,997
Referees: Joe Crawford, Mike Callahan, Ed Malloy

TNT

May 23
8:30 pm

Recap

Los Angeles Lakers 109, Phoenix Suns 118
Scoring by quarter: 32–29, 15–25, 37–32, 25–32
Pts: Kobe Bryant 36; Rebs: Bryant, Gasol 9 each Asts: Kobe Bryant 11	Pts: Amar'e Stoudemire 42; Rebs: Amar'e Stoudemire 11; Asts: Steve Nash 15
LA Lakers lead series, 2–1

US Airways Center, Phoenix, Arizona
Attendance: 18,422
Referees: Monty McCutchen, Eddie F. Rush, Tom Washington

TNT

May 25
9:00 pm

Recap

Los Angeles Lakers 106, Phoenix Suns 115
Scoring by quarter: 23–23, 32–41, 29–21, 22–30
Pts: Kobe Bryant 38; Rebs: Lamar Odom 10; Asts: Kobe Bryant 10	Pts: Amar'e Stoudemire 21; Rebs: Amar'e Stoudemire 8 Asts: Dragić, Nash 8 each
Series tied, 2–2

US Airways Center, Phoenix, Arizona
Attendance: 18,422
Referees: Dan Crawford, James Capers, Ken Mauer

TNT

May 27
9:00 pm

Recap

Phoenix Suns 101, Los Angeles Lakers 103
Scoring by quarter: 21–24, 24–29, 27–25, 29–25
Pts: Steve Nash 29; Rebs: Channing Frye 10; Asts: Steve Nash 11	Pts: Kobe Bryant 30; Rebs: Lamar Odom 13; Asts: Kobe Bryant 9
LA Lakers lead series, 3–2

Staples Center, Los Angeles
Attendance: 18,997
Referees: Bennett Salvatore, Marc Davis, Bob Delaney

TNT

May 29
8:30 pm

Recap

Los Angeles Lakers 111, Phoenix Suns 103
Scoring by quarter: 37–34, 28–19, 26–21, 20–29
Pts: Kobe Bryant 37; Rebs: Lamar Odom 12; Asts: Jordan Farmar 5	Pts: Amar'e Stoudemire 27; Rebs: Channing Frye 13; Asts: Steve Nash 9
LA Lakers win series, 4–2

US Airways Center, Phoenix, Arizona
Attendance: 18,422
Referees: Scott Foster, Bill Kennedy, Greg Willard

The Lakers put their home-court advantage to good use by winning the first two games at home. The Suns struck back to tie the series by taking Games 3 & 4 in Phoenix, but after a heart-breaking loss in Game 5 in which Ron Artest followed a missed airball by Kobe Bryant and hit the game-winner at the buzzer, the Suns found themselves trailing 3–2. Los Angeles held off a late Suns rally to steal Game 6 in Phoenix, as Kobe poured in 37 points, including a long jump shot in the final minute that put the game out of reach.

- Game 6 is Amar'e Stoudemire's final game with the Suns before he signed with the New York Knicks following the season.
- This is the last playoff match-up between Los Angeles & Phoenix until 2021.

Regular-season series
Los Angeles won 3–1 in the regular-season series

November 12, 2009

Recap

Phoenix Suns 102, Los Angeles Lakers 121

Staples Center, Los Angeles

December 6, 2009

Recap

Phoenix Suns 88, Los Angeles Lakers 108

Staples Center, Los Angeles

December 28, 2009

Recap

Los Angeles Lakers 103, Phoenix Suns 118

US Airways Center, Phoenix, Arizona

March 12, 2010

Recap

Los Angeles Lakers 102, Phoenix Suns 96

US Airways Center, Phoenix, Arizona

This was the 12th playoff meeting between these two teams, with the Lakers winning seven of the first 11 meetings.

Previous playoff series
Los Angeles leads 7–4 in all-time playoff series

1970

Los Angeles Lakers 4, Phoenix Suns 3

1970 Western Division Semifinals

1980

Los Angeles Lakers 4, Phoenix Suns 1

1980 Western Conference Semifinals

1982

Los Angeles Lakers 4, Phoenix Suns 0

1982 Western Conference Semifinals

1984

Los Angeles Lakers 4, Phoenix Suns 2

1984 Western Conference Finals

1985

Los Angeles Lakers 3, Phoenix Suns 0

1985 Western Conference First Round

1989

Los Angeles Lakers 4, Phoenix Suns 0

1989 Western Conference Finals

1990

Los Angeles Lakers 1, Phoenix Suns 4

1990 Western Conference Semifinals

1993

Los Angeles Lakers 2, Phoenix Suns 3

1993 Western Conference First Round

2000

Los Angeles Lakers 4, Phoenix Suns 1

2000 Western Conference Semifinals

2006

Los Angeles Lakers 3, Phoenix Suns 4

2006 Western Conference First Round

2007

Los Angeles Lakers 1, Phoenix Suns 4

2007 Western Conference First Round

== NBA Finals: (W1) Los Angeles Lakers vs. (E4) Boston Celtics ==
All times are in Eastern Daylight Time (UTC−4)

ABC

June 3
9:00 p.m.

Recap

Boston Celtics 89, Los Angeles Lakers 102
Scoring by quarter: 21–26, 20–24, 23–34, 25–18
Pts: Paul Pierce 24; Rebs: Paul Pierce 9 Asts: Rajon Rondo 8	Pts: Kobe Bryant 30; Rebs: Pau Gasol 14; Asts: Kobe Bryant 6
LA Lakers lead series, 1–0

Staples Center, Los Angeles
Attendance: 18,997
Referees: Joe Crawford, Joe DeRosa, Derrick Stafford

ABC

June 6
8:00 p.m.

Recap

Boston Celtics 103, Los Angeles Lakers 94
Scoring by quarter: 29–22, 25–26, 18–24, 31–22
Pts: Ray Allen 32; Rebs: Rajon Rondo 12; Asts: Rajon Rondo 10	Pts: Pau Gasol 25; Rebs: Pau Gasol 8 Asts: Kobe Bryant 6
Series tied, 1–1

Staples Center, Los Angeles
Attendance: 18,997
Referees: Monty McCutchen, Mike Callahan, Ken Mauer

ABC

June 8
9:00 p.m.

Recap

Los Angeles Lakers 91, Boston Celtics 84
Scoring by quarter: 26–17, 26–23, 15–21, 24–23
Pts: Kobe Bryant 29; Rebs: Bynum, Gasol 10 each Asts: Bryant, Gasol 4 each	Pts: Kevin Garnett 25; Rebs: Kendrick Perkins 11; Asts: Rajon Rondo 8
LA Lakers lead series, 2–1

TD Garden, Boston
Attendance: 18,624
Referees: Dan Crawford, Bill Kennedy, Bennett Salvatore

ABC

June 10
9:00 p.m.

Recap

Los Angeles Lakers 89, Boston Celtics 96
Scoring by quarter: 16–19, 29–23, 17–18, 27–36
Pts: Kobe Bryant 33; Rebs: Artest, Odom 7 each Asts: Artest, Gasol 3 each	Pts: Paul Pierce 19; Rebs: Kendrick Perkins 7 Asts: Paul Pierce 5
Series tied, 2–2

TD Garden, Boston
Attendance: 18,624
Referees: Scott Foster, Eddie F. Rush, Greg Willard

ABC

June 13
8:00 p.m.

Recap

Los Angeles Lakers 86, Boston Celtics 92
Scoring by quarter: 20–22, 19–23, 26–28, 21–19
Pts: Kobe Bryant 38; Rebs: Pau Gasol 12; Asts: Kobe Bryant 4	Pts: Paul Pierce 27; Rebs: Kevin Garnett 10; Asts: Rajon Rondo 8
Boston leads series, 3–2

TD Garden, Boston
Attendance: 18,624
Referees: Joe Crawford, Mike Callahan, Derrick Stafford

ABC

June 15
9:00 p.m.

Recap

Boston Celtics 67, Los Angeles Lakers 89
Scoring by quarter: 18–28, 13–23, 20–25, 16–13
Pts: Ray Allen 19; Rebs: Glen Davis 9 Asts: Rajon Rondo 6	Pts: Kobe Bryant 26; Rebs: Pau Gasol 13; Asts: Pau Gasol 9
Series tied, 3–3

Staples Center, Los Angeles
Attendance: 18,997
Referees: Monty McCutchen, Joe DeRosa, Ken Mauer

ABC

June 17
9:00 p.m.

Recap

Boston Celtics 79, Los Angeles Lakers 83
Scoring by quarter: 23–14, 17–20, 17–19, 22–30
Pts: Paul Pierce 18; Rebs: Paul Pierce 10; Asts: Rajon Rondo 10	Pts: Kobe Bryant 23; Rebs: Pau Gasol 18; Asts: Pau Gasol 4
LA Lakers win series, 4–3

Staples Center, Los Angeles
Attendance: 18,997
Referees: Dan Crawford, Joe Crawford, Scott Foster

Regular-season series
Tied 1–1 in the regular-season series

January 31, 2010

Recap

Los Angeles Lakers 90, Boston Celtics 89

TD Garden, Boston

February 18, 2010

Recap

Boston Celtics 87, Los Angeles Lakers 86

Staples Center, Los Angeles

This was the 12th playoff meeting between these two teams, with the Celtics winning nine of the first 11 meetings.

Previous playoff series
Boston leads 9–2 in all-time playoff series

1959

Boston Celtics 4, Minneapolis Lakers 0

1959 NBA Finals

1962

Boston Celtics 4, Los Angeles Lakers 3

1962 NBA Finals

1963

Boston Celtics 4, Los Angeles Lakers 2

1963 NBA Finals

1965

Boston Celtics 4, Los Angeles Lakers 1

1965 NBA Finals

1966

Boston Celtics 4, Los Angeles Lakers 3

1966 NBA Finals

1968

Boston Celtics 4, Los Angeles Lakers 2

1968 NBA Finals

1969

Boston Celtics 4, Los Angeles Lakers 3

1969 NBA Finals

1984

Boston Celtics 4, Los Angeles Lakers 3

1984 NBA Finals

1985

Boston Celtics 2, Los Angeles Lakers 4

1985 NBA Finals

1987

Boston Celtics 2, Los Angeles Lakers 4

1987 NBA Finals

2008

Boston Celtics 4, Los Angeles Lakers 2

2008 NBA Finals

== Statistic leaders ==
Category	High			Average			
Category	Player	Team	Total	Player	Team	Avg.	Games played
Points	Dwyane Wade	Miami Heat	46	Dwyane Wade	Miami Heat	33.2	5
Rebounds	Carlos Boozer; Joakim Noah	Utah Jazz; Chicago Bulls	20; 20	Carlos Boozer	Utah Jazz	13.2	10
Assists	Rajon Rondo	Boston Celtics	19	Deron Williams	Utah Jazz	10.2	10
Steals	John Salmons	Milwaukee Bucks	6	Manu Ginóbili	San Antonio Spurs	2.6	10
Blocks	Dwight Howard	Orlando Magic	9	Dwight Howard	Orlando Magic	3.5	14
