= 2009–10 Dallas Mavericks season =

NBA professional basketball team season

- Division champions
- Head coach: Rick Carlisle
- President: Donnie Nelson
- General manager: Donnie Nelson
- Owner: Mark Cuban
- Arena: American Airlines Center

Results
- Record: 55–27 (.671)
- Place: Division: 1st (Southwest); Conference: 2nd (Western)
- Playoff finish: First Round (lost to Spurs 2–4)
- Stats at Basketball Reference

Local media
- Television: Fox Sports Southwest; KTXA
- Radio: KESN

The 2009–10 Dallas Mavericks season was the 30th season of the franchise in the National Basketball Association (NBA).

This was the 12th season for Dirk Nowitzki. He was selected to represent the Western Conference as an All-Star. He was also a Team Captain. They finished another best record of 55–27, finishing as the 2nd seed in the West. The Mavericks also got their third division title, and first since 2007.

In the playoffs, they met the San Antonio Spurs for the second straight season in a rematch of the previous year's first round series in which Dallas won in five games. This time, Dallas lost to the Spurs in six games.

== Key dates ==
- June 25 – The 2009 NBA draft took place in New York City.
- July 8 – The free agency period started.

== Draft picks ==
Round	Pick	Player	Position	Nationality	College/Team
1	24	Byron Mullens (traded to Oklahoma City)	C	United States	Ohio State
1	25	Rodrigue Beaubois (traded from Oklahoma City)	PG	France	Cholet (France)
2	45	Nick Calathes (traded from Minnesota)	PG	United States; Greece	Oregon
2	52	A. J. Price (traded to Indiana)	PG	United States	Connecticut
2	56	Ahmad Nivins	PF	United States	Saint Joseph's

a: Nick Calathes was born in the United States, but also has Greek citizenship through his parents, and competes internationally for Greece.

== Roster ==
2009–10 Dallas Mavericks roster
Players

Pos.	No.	Player	Height	Weight	DOB	From
G	11	José Juan Barea	6 ft 0 in (1.83 m)	175 lb (79 kg)	1984–06–26	Northeastern
G	3	Rodrigue Beaubois	6 ft 2 in (1.88 m)	185 lb (84 kg)	1988–02–24	France
G/F	4	Caron Butler	6 ft 7 in (2.01 m)	217 lb (98 kg)	1980–03–13	Connecticut
G	13	Matt Carroll	6 ft 6 in (1.98 m)	212 lb (96 kg)	1980–08–28	Notre Dame
C	25	Erick Dampier	6 ft 11 in (2.11 m)	265 lb (120 kg)	1975–07–14	Mississippi State
C	33	Brendan Haywood	7 ft 0 in (2.13 m)	263 lb (119 kg)	1979–11–27	North Carolina
G	2	Jason Kidd	6 ft 4 in (1.93 m)	210 lb (95 kg)	1973–03–23	California
F	0	Shawn Marion	6 ft 7 in (2.01 m)	220 lb (100 kg)	1978–05–07	UNLV
F	14	Eduardo Nájera	6 ft 8 in (2.03 m)	235 lb (107 kg)	1976–07–11	Oklahoma
F	41	Dirk Nowitzki	7 ft 0 in (2.13 m)	245 lb (111 kg)	1978–06–19	Germany
G	92	DeShawn Stevenson	6 ft 5 in (1.96 m)	218 lb (99 kg)	1981–04–03	Washington Union High School (CA)
G	31	Jason Terry	6 ft 2 in (1.88 m)	185 lb (84 kg)	1977–09–15	Arizona
F	7	Tim Thomas	6 ft 10 in (2.08 m)	240 lb (109 kg)	1977–02–26	Villanova

Coaches
Head coach
- Rick Carlisle
Assistant(s)
- Darrell Armstrong
- Terry Stotts
- Dwane Casey
- Tom Sterner

Legend
- (DP) Unsigned draft pick
- (FA) Free agent
- (S) Suspended
- Injured

== Pre-season ==
2009 Pre-season game log: 5–2 (home: 3–1; road: 2–1)
#	Date	Opponent	Score	Attendance	Record	Recap
1	October 5	Orlando	L 105–110	American Airlines Center; 16,596	0–1
2	October 9	@ Washington	W 123–115	Verizon Center; 8,102	1–1
3	October 11	Memphis	W 114–107	American Airlines Center; 18,207	2–1
4	October 15	Detroit	W 113–88	American Airlines Center; 17,555	3–1
5	October 17	Cleveland	W 93–82	American Airlines Center; 18,525	4–1
6	October 20	@ Cleveland	L 66–96	Petersen Events Center; 10,011	4–2
7	October 23	@ Houston	W 98–94	Toyota Center; 16,393	5–2

== Regular season ==
=== Standings ===
Southwest Division	W	L	PCT	GB	Home	Road	Div
y-Dallas Mavericks	55	27	.671	–	28–13	27–14	10–6
x-San Antonio Spurs	50	32	.610	5	29–12	21–20	9–7
Houston Rockets	42	40	.512	13	23–18	19–22	9–7
Memphis Grizzlies	40	42	.488	15	23–18	17–24	5–11
New Orleans Hornets	37	45	.451	18	24–17	13–28	7–9

#	Western Conference				
#	Team	W	L	PCT	GB
1	c-Los Angeles Lakers	57	25	.695	–
2	y-Dallas Mavericks	55	27	.671	2
3	x-Phoenix Suns	54	28	.659	3
4	y-Denver Nuggets	53	29	.646	4
5	x-Utah Jazz	53	29	.646	4
6	x-Portland Trail Blazers	50	32	.610	7
7	x-San Antonio Spurs	50	32	.610	7
8	x-Oklahoma City Thunder	50	32	.610	7
9	Houston Rockets	42	40	.512	15
10	Memphis Grizzlies	40	42	.488	17
11	New Orleans Hornets	37	45	.451	20
12	Los Angeles Clippers	29	53	.354	28
13	Golden State Warriors	26	56	.317	31
14	Sacramento Kings	25	57	.305	32
15	Minnesota Timberwolves	15	67	.183	42

=== Game log ===
2009–10 game log
October: 2–1 (home: 0–1; road: 2–0)

Game	Date	Team	Score	High points	High rebounds	High assists	Location Attendance	Record
1	October 27	Washington	L 91–102	Dirk Nowitzki (34)	Dirk Nowitzki (9)	Jason Kidd (6)	American Airlines Center; 19,871	0–1
2	October 30	@ LA Lakers	W 94–80	Dirk Nowitzki (21)	Erick Dampier, Dirk Nowitzki (10)	Jason Kidd (11)	Staples Center; 18,997	1-1
3	October 31	@ LA Clippers	W 93–84	Dirk Nowitzki (24)	Shawn Marion (11)	Jason Kidd (10)	Staples Center; 13,626	2–1

November: 11–4 (home: 6–1; road: 5–3)

Game	Date	Team	Score	High points	High rebounds	High assists	Location Attendance	Record
4	November 3	Utah	W 96–85	Dirk Nowitzki (40)	Erick Dampier (12)	Jason Kidd (6)	American Airlines Center; 19,725	3–1
5	November 4	@ New Orleans	L 107–114	Jason Terry (35)	Erick Dampier (14)	Jason Kidd (10)	New Orleans Arena; 13,566	3–2
6	November 7	Toronto	W 94–80	Dirk Nowitzki (29)	Dirk Nowitzki (9)	José Juan Barea (12)	American Airlines Center; 19,977	4–2
7	November 10	Houston	W 121–103	Jason Terry (24)	Erick Dampier(20)	Jason Kidd (11)	American Airlines Center; 19,720	5–2
8	November 11	@ San Antonio	L 83–92	Dirk Nowitzki (29)	Dirk Nowitzki (12)	Jason Kidd (9)	AT&T Center; 18,581	5–3
9	November 13	@ Minnesota	W 89–77	Dirk Nowitzki (20)	Dirk Nowitzki (11)	Jason Kidd (6)	Target Center; 12,372	6–3
10	November 15	@ Detroit	W 95–90	Dirk Nowitzki (25)	Drew Gooden (11)	Jason Kidd (7)	Palace of Auburn Hills; 18,215	7–3
11	November 16	@ Milwaukee	W 115–113	Dirk Nowitzki (32)	Drew Gooden (14)	Jason Kidd (17)	Bradley Center; 13,683	8–3
12	November 18	San Antonio	W 99–94	Dirk Nowitzki (41)	Dirk Nowitzki (12)	Jason Kidd (8)	American Airlines Center; 20,110	9–3
13	November 20	Sacramento	W 104–102	Dirk Nowitzki, Jason Terry (20)	Drew Gooden (16)	Jason Kidd (11)	American Airlines Center; 19,871	10–3
14	November 24	Golden State	L 103–111	Dirk Nowitzki (28)	Drew Gooden (12)	Jason Kidd (13)	American Airlines; 20,008	10–4
15	November 25	@ Houston	W 130–99	Jason Terry (27)	Dirk Nowitzki (8)	Jason Terry (10)	Toyota Center; 18,157	11–4
16	November 27	@ Indiana	W 113–92	Dirk Nowitzki (31)	Kris Humphries (11)	José Juan Barea, Jason Kidd (4)	Conseco Fieldhouse; 16,631	12–4
17	November 28	@ Cleveland	L 95–111	Dirk Nowitzki (27)	Dirk Nowitzki (9)	Jason Kidd (9)	Quicken Loans Arena; 20,562	12–5
18	November 30	Philadelphia	W 104–102	Dirk Nowitzki (28)	Drew Gooden (10)	Jason Kidd (11)	American Airlines Center; 19,783	13–5

December: 9–5 (home: 5–3; road: 4–2)

Game	Date	Team	Score	High points	High rebounds	High assists	Location Attendance	Record
19	December 2	@ New Jersey	W 117–101	Dirk Nowitzki (24)	Erick Dampier (11)	Jason Kidd (10)	IZOD Center; 11,689	14–5
20	December 4	@ Memphis	L 82–98	Jason Terry (18)	Shawn Marion (11)	Jason Kidd (7)	FedExForum; 13,020	14–6
21	December 5	Atlanta	L 75–80	Dirk Nowitzki (32)	Erick Dampier (12)	Jason Kidd (6)	American Airlines Center; 19,550	14–7
22	December 8	Phoenix	W 102–101	Dirk Nowitzki (33)	Dirk Nowitzki (8)	Jason Kidd (11)	American Airlines Center; 19,857	15–7
23	December 11	@ Miami	W 106–93	Dirk Nowitzki (25)	Erick Dampier (17)	Jason Kidd (11)	American Airlines Arena; 18,703	16–7
24	December 12	Charlotte	W 98–97	Dirk Nowitzki (36)	Erick Dampier (18)	Jason Kidd (9)	American Airlines Center; 20,151	17–7
25	December 14	New Orleans	W 94–90	José Juan Barea (23)	Erick Dampier, Josh Howard (8)	Jason Kidd (13)	American Airlines Center; 19,737	18–7
26	December 16	@ Oklahoma City	W 100–86	Dirk Nowitzki (35)	Dirk Nowitzki (11)	Jason Kidd (9)	Ford Center; 18,203	19–7
27	December 18	Houston	L 108–116	José Juan Barea (23)	Erick Dampier (14)	Jason Kidd (10)	American Airlines Center; 19,890	19–8
28	December 20	Cleveland	W 102–95	Tim Thomas (22)	Erick Dampier (10)	Jason Kidd (11)	American Airlines Center; 20,346	20–8
29	December 22	Portland	L 81–85	Dirk Nowitzki (27)	Erick Dampier (15)	Jason Kidd (6)	American Airlines Center; 19,863	20–9
30	December 26	Memphis	W 106–101	Jason Terry (23)	Erick Dampier (10)	Jason Kidd (10)	American Airlines Center; 20,195	21–9
31	December 27	@ Denver	W 104–96	Drew Gooden (19)	Dirk Nowitzki (11)	Jason Kidd (9)	Pepsi Center; 19,756	22–9
32	December 31	@ Houston	L 94–97	Jason Terry (28)	Shawn Marion (9)	Jason Kidd (5)	Toyota Center; 18,306	22–10

January: 8–7 (home: 3–3; road: 5–4)

Game	Date	Team	Score	High points	High rebounds	High assists	Location Attendance	Record
33	January 2	@ Sacramento	W 99–91	Dirk Nowitzki (25)	Drew Gooden (10)	Jason Kidd (7)	ARCO Center; 14,294	23–10
34	January 3	@ LA Lakers	L 96–131	Dirk Nowitzki (22)	Dirk Nowitzki (8)	Jason Kidd (5)	Staples Center; 18,997	23–11
35	January 5	Detroit	W 98–93	Jason Terry (26)	Drew Gooden (18)	Jason Kidd (8)	American Airlines Center; 19,799	24–11
36	January 8	@ San Antonio	W 112–103	Dirk Nowitzki (26)	Drew Gooden (8)	Jason Kidd, Jason Terry (8)	AT&T Center; 18,581	25–11
37	January 9	Utah	L 93–111	Dirk Nowitzki (29)	Erick Dampier (13)	Jason Kidd (8)	American Airlines Center; 19,922	25–12
38	January 13	LA Lakers	L 95–100	Dirk Nowitzki (30)	Dirk Nowitzki (16)	Jason Kidd (11)	American Airlines Center; 20,461	25–13
39	January 15	Oklahoma City	W 99–98	Dirk Nowitzki (32)	Erick Dampier (9)	Jason Kidd (11)	American Airlines Center; 20,064	26–13
40	January 17	@ Toronto	L 88–110	Dirk Nowitzki (19)	Drew Gooden (10)	Jason Kidd (9)	Air Canada Centre; 19,004	26–14
41	January 18	@ Boston	W 99–90	Dirk Nowitzki (37)	Shawn Marion (10)	Jason Kidd (17)	TD Garden; 18,624	27–14
42	January 20	@ Washington	W 94–93	Dirk Nowitzki (28)	Shawn Marion (12)	Jason Kidd (15)	Verizon Center; 13,974	28–14
43	January 22	@ Philadelphia	L 82–91	Dirk Nowitzki (15)	Jason Kidd (9)	Jason Kidd (7)	Wachovia Center; 17,647	28–15
44	January 24	@ NY Knicks	W 128–78	Dirk Nowitzki, Jason Terry (20)	Drew Gooden (18)	Rodrigue Beaubois (5)	Madison Square Garden; 19,418	29–15
45	January 26	Milwaukee	W 108–107	Dirk Nowitzki (28)	Erick Dampier (11)	Jason Kidd (12)	American Airlines Center; 19,799	30–15
46	January 28	@ Phoenix	L 106–112	Jason Terry (21)	Shawn Marion (8)	Jason Kidd (6)	US Airways Center; 17,855	30–16
47	January 30	Portland	L 112–114	Dirk Nowitzki (28)	Dirk Nowitzki (9)	Jason Kidd (10)	American Airlines Center; 20,078	30–17

February: 9–4 (home: 6–1; road: 3–3)

Game	Date	Team	Score	High points	High rebounds	High assists	Location Attendance	Record
48	February 1	@ Utah	L 92–104	Dirk Nowitzki (28)	Dirk Nowitzki (8)	Jason Kidd (9)	EnergySolutions Arena; 19,911	30–18
49	February 3	Golden State	W 110–101	Jason Terry (21)	Shawn Marion (9)	Jason Kidd (16)	American Airlines Center; 19,679	31–18
50	February 5	Minnesota	L 108–117	Dirk Nowitzki (21)	Erick Dampier (10)	Jason Kidd (7)	American Airlines Center; 20,034	31–19
51	February 8	@ Golden State	W 127–117	Jason Terry (36)	Drew Gooden (10)	Jason Kidd (12)	Oracle Arena; 17,015	32–19
52	February 9	@ Denver	L 91–127	Dirk Nowitzki (17)	Drew Gooden (6)	Jason Kidd (5)	Pepsi Center; 17,485	32–20
53	February 16	@ Oklahoma City	L 86–99	Dirk Nowitzki (24)	Erick Dampier (13)	Dirk Nowitzki (6)	Ford Center; 18,203	32–21
54	February 17	Phoenix	W 107–97	Dirk Nowitzki (28)	Shawn Marion (10)	Jason Kidd (10)	American Airlines Center; 19,974	33–21
55	February 19	@ Orlando	W 95–85	Dirk Nowitzki (23)	Brendan Haywood (9)	Jason Kidd (8)	Amway Arena; 17,461	34–21
56	February 20	Miami	W 97–91	Dirk Nowitzki (28)	Brendan Haywood (11)	Jason Kidd (11)	American Airlines Center; 20,328	35–21
57	February 22	Indiana	W 91–82	Dirk Nowitzki (23)	Brendan Haywood (20)	Jason Kidd (7)	American Airlines Center; 19,585	36–21
58	February 24	LA Lakers	W 101–96	Dirk Nowitzki (31)	Dirk Nowitzki (9)	Jason Kidd (13)	American Airlines Center; 20,505	37–21
59	February 26	@ Atlanta	W 111–103	Dirk Nowitzki (37)	Jason Kidd (16)	Jason Kidd (17)	Philips Arena; 18,923	38–21
60	February 28	New Orleans	W 108–100	Dirk Nowitzki (36)	Jason Kidd (9)	José Juan Barea (9)	American Airlines Center; 19,911	39–21

March: 11–4 (home: 6–2; road: 5–2)

Game	Date	Team	Score	High points	High rebounds	High assists	Location Attendance	Record
61	March 1	@ Charlotte	W 89–84	Dirk Nowitzki (27)	Dirk Nowitzki (13)	Jason Kidd (7)	Time Warner Cable Arena; 15,691	40–21
62	March 3	Minnesota	W 112–109	Jason Terry (26)	Shawn Marion (7)	Jason Terry (5)	American Airlines Center; 19,511	41–21
63	March 5	Sacramento	W 108–100	Dirk Nowitzki (31)	Dirk Nowitzki (12)	Jason Kidd (12)	American Airlines Center; 19,954	42–21
64	March 6	@ Chicago	W 122–116	Dirk Nowitzki (27)	Jason Kidd (11)	Jason Kidd (15)	United Center; 21,737	43–21
65	March 8	@ Minnesota	W 125–112	Shawn Marion (29)	Shawn Marion (14)	Jason Kidd (9)	Target Center; 14,007	44–21
66	March 10	New Jersey	W 96–87	Jason Kidd (20)	Shawn Marion (13)	Jason Kidd (9)	American Airlines Center; 19,770	45–21
67	March 13	NY Knicks	L 94–128	Dirk Nowitzki (20)	Dirk Nowitzki (12)	Jason Kidd (6)	American Airlines Center; 20,224	45–22
68	March 17	Chicago	W 113–106	Caron Butler (27)	Dirk Nowitzki (7)	Dirk Nowitzki (5)	American Airlines Center; 20,406	46–22
69	March 20	Boston	L 93–102	Dirk Nowitzki (28)	Jason Kidd (6)	Jason Kidd (9)	American Airlines Center; 20,488	46–23
70	March 22	@ New Orleans	L 99–115	Jason Terry (24)	Brendan Haywood (9)	Jason Kidd (6)	New Orleans Arena; 14,047	46–24
71	March 23	LA Clippers	W 106–96	Jason Kidd (26)	Brendan Haywood (10)	Jason Kidd (12)	American Airlines Center; 19,705	47–24
72	March 25	@ Portland	L 89–101	Caron Butler (25)	Caron Butler (9)	Jason Kidd (7)	Rose Garden Arena; 20,611	47–25
73	March 27	@ Golden State	W 111–90	Rodrigue Beaubois (40)	Dirk Nowitzki (10)	Jason Kidd (11)	Oracle Arena; 19,104	48–25
74	March 29	Denver	W 109–93	Dirk Nowitzki (34)	Dirk Nowitzki (10)	Jason Kidd (10)	American Airlines Center; 20,085	49–25
75	March 31	@ Memphis	W 106–102	Jason Terry (29)	Caron Butler (13)	Jason Kidd (7)	FedExForum; 11,616	50–25

April: 5–2 (home: 2–2; road: 3–0)

Game	Date	Team	Score	High points	High rebounds	High assists	Location Attendance	Record
76	April 1	Orlando	L 82–97	Dirk Nowitzki (24)	Erick Dampier (11)	Jason Kidd (2)	American Airlines Center; 19,965	50–26
77	April 3	Oklahoma City	L 116–121	Dirk Nowitzki (30)	Dirk Nowitzki (13)	Jason Kidd (6)	American Airlines Center; 20,329	50–27
78	April 7	Memphis	W 110–84	Caron Butler (23)	Dirk Nowitzki (9)	Jason Kidd (10)	American Airlines Center; 20,105	51–27
79	April 9	@ Portland	W 83–77	Dirk Nowitzki (40)	Jason Kidd (12)	Jason Kidd (6)	Rose Garden Arena; 20,693	52–27
80	April 10	@ Sacramento	W 126–108	Dirk Nowitzki (39)	Jason Kidd (10)	Jason Kidd (13)	ARCO Arena; 15,247	53–27
81	April 12	@ LA Clippers	W 117–94	Dirk Nowitzki (25)	Dirk Nowitzki (8)	Jason Kidd (12)	Staples Center; 17,838	54–27
82	April 14	San Antonio	W 96–89	Caron Butler (20)	Brendan Haywood (15)	Dirk Nowitzki (5)	American Airlines Center; 20,405	55–27

2009–10 season schedule

== Playoffs ==
=== Game log ===
2010 playoff game log
First round: 2–4 (home: 2–1; road: 0–3)

Game	Date	Team	Score	High points	High rebounds	High assists	Location Attendance	Series
1	April 18	San Antonio	W 100–94	Dirk Nowitzki (36)	Erick Dampier (12)	Jason Kidd (11)	American Airlines Center; 20,372	1–0
2	April 21	San Antonio	L 88–102	Jason Terry (27)	Dirk Nowitzki (10)	Jason Kidd (8)	American Airlines Center; 20,728	1–1
3	April 23	@ San Antonio	L 90–94	Dirk Nowitzki (35)	Dirk Nowitzki, Jason Kidd (7)	Jason Kidd (5)	AT&T Center; 18,581	1–2
4	April 25	@ San Antonio	L 89–92	Dirk Nowitzki, Caron Butler (17)	Dirk Nowitzki (11)	Jason Kidd (5)	AT&T Center; 18,581	1–3
5	April 27	San Antonio	W 103–81	Caron Butler (35)	Caron Butler (11)	Jason Kidd (7)	American Airlines Center; 20,557	2–3
6	April 29	@ San Antonio	L 87–97	Dirk Nowitzki (33)	Jason Kidd (8)	Jason Kidd (6)	AT&T Center; 18,581	2–4

2010 playoff schedule

== Player statistics ==
=== Ragular season ===
Player	POS	GP	GS	MP	REB	AST	STL	BLK	PTS	MPG	RPG	APG	SPG	BPG	PPG
Dirk Nowitzki	PF	81	80	3,039	620	218	70	79	2,027	37.5	7.7	2.7	.9	1.0	25.0
Jason Kidd	PG	80	80	2,881	445	724	145	35	824	36.0	5.6	9.1	1.8	.4	10.3
J. J. Barea	PG	78	18	1,546	146	258	35	6	596	19.8	1.9	3.3	.4	.1	7.6
Jason Terry	SG	77	12	2,540	140	292	94	17	1,280	33.0	1.8	3.8	1.2	.2	16.6
Shawn Marion	SF	75	75	2,385	477	107	69	61	898	31.8	6.4	1.4	.9	.8	12.0
Rodrigue Beaubois	PG	56	16	700	78	74	29	12	397	12.5	1.4	1.3	.5	.2	7.1
Erick Dampier	C	55	47	1,280	400	31	15	77	328	23.3	7.3	.6	.3	1.4	6.0
Drew Gooden^{†}	C	46	11	1,030	316	26	26	50	408	22.4	6.9	.6	.6	1.1	8.9
Eduardo Nájera^{†}	PF	33	3	481	77	14	17	12	108	14.6	2.3	.4	.5	.4	3.3
Josh Howard^{†}	SF	31	9	827	112	44	23	9	388	26.7	3.6	1.4	.7	.3	12.5
Brendan Haywood^{†}	C	28	19	741	208	25	8	57	226	26.5	7.4	.9	.3	2.0	8.1
Caron Butler^{†}	SG	27	27	930	145	49	48	9	410	34.4	5.4	1.8	1.8	.3	15.2
Quinton Ross^{†}	SF	27	7	301	27	7	7	4	54	11.1	1.0	.3	.3	.1	2.0
Kris Humphries^{†}	PF	25	0	315	95	7	7	11	131	12.6	3.8	.3	.3	.4	5.2
James Singleton^{†}	SF	25	0	211	55	9	11	7	59	8.4	2.2	.4	.4	.3	2.4
Matt Carroll	SG	25	0	121	12	6	5	0	46	4.8	.5	.2	.2	.0	1.8
DeShawn Stevenson^{†}	SG	24	5	267	26	12	5	1	49	11.1	1.1	.5	.2	.0	2.0
Tim Thomas	SF	18	1	285	41	14	10	2	135	15.8	2.3	.8	.6	.1	7.5

- ^{†} Denotes player spent time with another team in the season. Stats reflect time with the Mavericks only.

=== Playoffs ===
Player	POS	GP	GS	MP	REB	AST	STL	BLK	PTS	MPG	RPG	APG	SPG	BPG	PPG
Jason Kidd	PG	6	6	243	41	42	14	1	48	40.5	6.8	7.0	2.3	.2	8.0
Dirk Nowitzki	PF	6	6	233	49	18	5	4	160	38.8	8.2	3.0	.8	.7	26.7
Caron Butler	SG	6	6	202	35	8	9	5	118	33.7	5.8	1.3	1.5	.8	19.7
Shawn Marion	SF	6	6	148	25	6	1	3	52	24.7	4.2	1.0	.2	.5	8.7
Brendan Haywood	C	6	2	139	37	3	7	10	36	23.2	6.2	.5	1.2	1.7	6.0
Jason Terry	SG	6	0	174	15	12	4	1	76	29.0	2.5	2.0	.7	.2	12.7
J. J. Barea	PG	6	0	105	12	15	2	1	35	17.5	2.0	2.5	.3	.2	5.8
Erick Dampier	C	5	4	118	33	3	1	5	5	23.6	6.6	.6	.2	1.0	1.0
Eduardo Nájera	PF	5	0	36	9	0	2	0	4	7.2	1.8	.0	.4	.0	.8
Rodrigue Beaubois	PG	4	0	31	6	4	0	0	21	7.8	1.5	1.0	.0	.0	5.3
DeShawn Stevenson	SG	2	0	6	0	0	0	0	0	3.0	.0	.0	.0	.0	.0
Matt Carroll	SG	1	0	5	1	0	0	0	2	5.0	1.0	.0	.0	.0	2.0

== Awards, records and milestones ==
=== Awards ===
==== All-Star ====
- Dirk Nowitzki was voted to his 9th NBA All-Star Game and started in place of Kobe Bryant due to injury.
- Jason Kidd was selected to his 10th NBA All-Star Game as a replacement for Kobe Bryant due to injury.

==== Weekly/Monthly ====
- Dirk Nowitzki was named Western Conference Player of the Week for games played from November 9 through November 15.
- Dirk Nowitzki was named Western Conference Player of the Week for games played from February 22 through February 28.
- Dirk Nowitzki was named Western Conference Player of the Week for games played from March 1 through March 7.
- Dirk Nowitzki was named Western Conference Player of the Week for games played from April 5 through April 11.

=== Records ===
- On January 24, the Mavericks recorded their largest margin of victory in franchise history after defeating the New York Knicks 128–78, a 50-point margin. This was the third largest margin of victory in NBA history and the worst loss in Knicks history.

=== Milestones ===
- On January 13, Dirk Nowitzki became the 4th foreign-born and 1st European-born player in NBA history to score 20,000 points in his career.

== Injuries ==
Injuries

== Transactions ==
=== Trades ===
July 9, 2009	To Dallas Mavericks Greg Buckner	To Washington Wizards Jerry Stackhouse; Cash considerations

July 9, 2009	To Dallas Mavericks Shawn Marion; Kris Humphries; Nathan Jawai; Cash considerations	To Toronto Raptors Devean George; Antoine Wright

January 11, 2010	To Dallas Mavericks Eduardo Nájera	To New Jersey Nets Kris Humphries; Shawne Williams

February 13, 2010	To Dallas Mavericks Caron Butler; Brendan Haywood; DeShawn Stevenson	To Washington Wizards Josh Howard; Drew Gooden; James Singleton; Quinton Ross

=== Free agents ===
On Tuesday, July 28 Dallas signed free agent forward Tim Thomas

On Thursday July 30 Dallas signed forward Drew Gooden.

==== Subtractions ====
9-15-09: Released, Greg Buckner (G)

10-23-09: Waived, Jake Voskuhl (C)
