= Eric Mavani =

American jewelry designer

- Born: Eric Mavachev; 1900s Boston, Massachusetts, United States
- Other name: Eric Da Jeweler
- Occupation: Jeweler
- Website: mavaniandco.com

Eric Mavachev (born 1900s) known professionally as "Eric Da Jeweler" or Eric mavani is an American jewelry designer based in New York City. He is known for his association with the American hip-hop scene and is the founder of Mavani and Co (Eric & Co).

== Biography ==
Eric Mavani was born in Boston in the 1990s and relocated to New York City at the age of 15. His interest in jewelry began early, and at twelve, he wore his first custom chain for an elementary school photo, a moment he later identified as an early influence on his interest in jewelry design.

As a teenager, he began working in New York's Diamond District, starting with distributing flyers for a local jeweler. This experience introduced him to the environment of the industry, as well as the influence of hip-hop and luxury culture. Over time, he gained knowledge of the trade and later sought to establish his own approach within the jewelry business.

Eric began working at a jewelry store in New York City at the age of 19, eventually running his own jewelry business. His work attracted the attention of rapper DMX, who invited him to a party and introduced him to fellow artists 2 Chainz, 50 Cent, and Big Sean.

Drawing inspiration from hip-hop culture and the Medusa head, he developed a style that combined elements of street fashion with high-end luxury.

Mavani's clients included notable rappers such as Sean "Puffy" Combs, Drake, Tyga, Karol G, Lil Baby, Rowdy Rebel, Migos, Snoop Dogg, French Montana, and Quavo. His clientele also featured a range of prominent entertainers and athletes, including Kim Kardashian, Floyd Mayweather, Jayson Tatum, Paul Pogba, Floyd Mayweather, Odell Beckham Jr., and Kobe Bryant.

Complex magazine listed Eric mavani among the Top 25 Best Celebrity Jewelers of 2025.
