= 2018 NBA playoffs =

Postseason tournament

Tournament details
- Dates: April 14 – June 8, 2018
- Season: 2017–18
- Teams: 16

Final positions
- Champions: Golden State Warriors (6th title)
- Runners-up: Cleveland Cavaliers
- Semifinalists: Boston Celtics; Houston Rockets

Tournament statistics
- Scoring leader(s): LeBron James (Cavaliers) (34.0 PPG)

Awards
- MVP: Kevin Durant (Warriors)

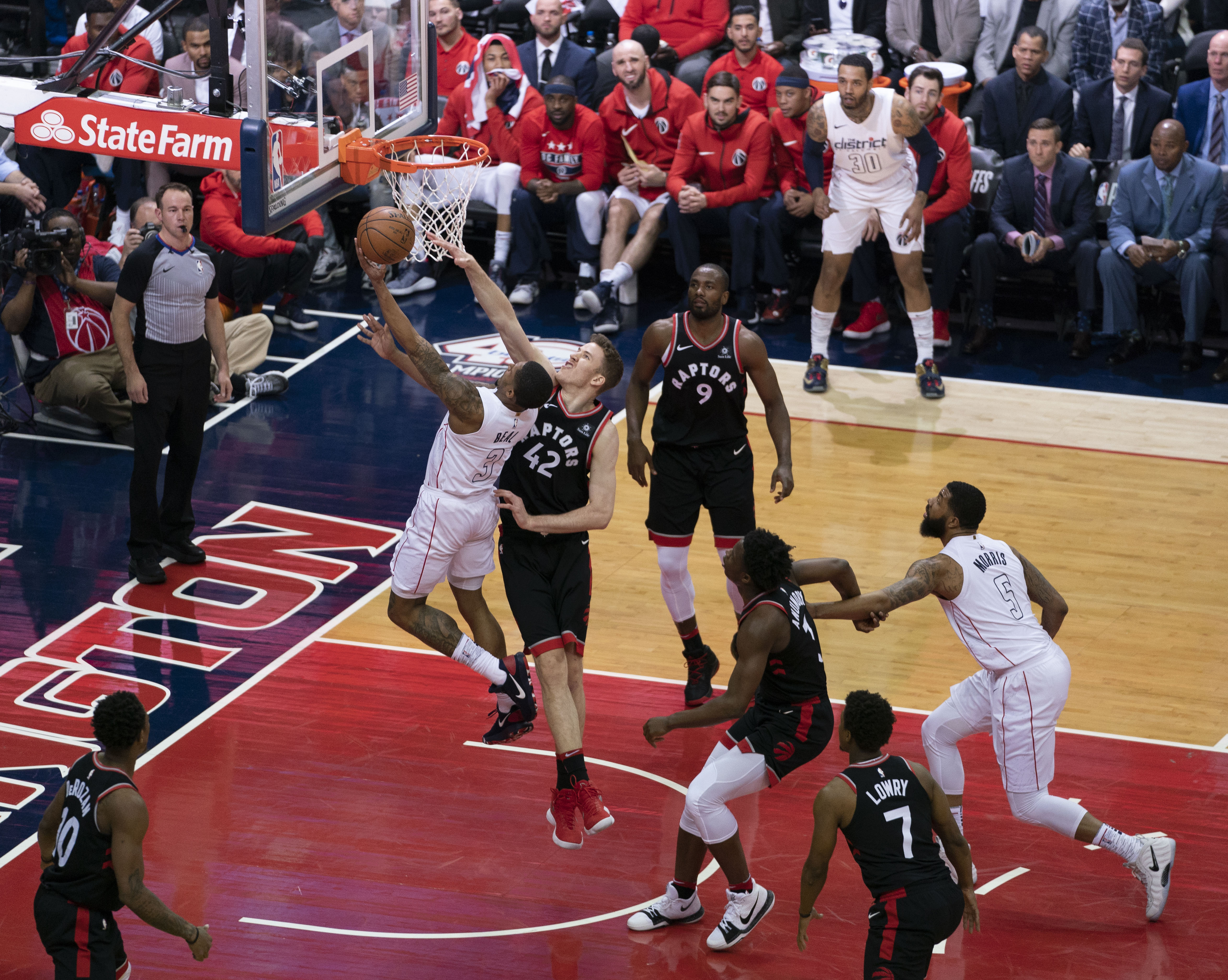
Bradley Beal of the Washington Wizards attempts a layup against Jakob Poeltl of the Toronto Raptors during 2018 NBA Playoffs

The 2018 NBA playoffs was the postseason tournament of the National Basketball Association's (NBA) 2017–18 season. The playoffs began on April 14, and ended on June 8 with the defending champion Golden State Warriors defeating the Cleveland Cavaliers in the 2018 NBA Finals. It was the first sweep in the NBA Finals since 2007. The series marked LeBron James's eighth consecutive Finals appearance, and the first time that the same two teams in any of the four major sports leagues in North America met in the championship for four consecutive years.

This was Dwyane Wade's final playoff appearance, as he retired the following season.

Both the conference finals series went to game 7. In the Eastern Conference finals, the Cavaliers defeated Boston Celtics in the Eastern Conference Finals, a rematch from last year's East finals, while the Warriors defeated the Houston Rockets in the Western Conference finals.

== Overview ==
=== Western Conference ===
- The Houston Rockets entered the playoffs with their best regular–season record in franchise history and appeared in their sixth consecutive postseason. They also finished with the best record in the NBA.
- The Golden State Warriors entered their sixth consecutive postseason, tying their franchise streak of 6 straight postseason appearances since the league's first six years of existence (1946–47 to 1951–52).
- The San Antonio Spurs entered their 21st consecutive postseason.
- The Minnesota Timberwolves qualified for the playoffs for the first time since 2004 and snapped the league's longest active streak of seasons without a playoff appearance.
- The New Orleans Pelicans qualified for the playoffs for the first time since 2015.

=== Eastern Conference ===
- The Toronto Raptors also finished with a franchise record for single-season victories, winning 59 games and finished with the best record in the Eastern Conference.
- The Philadelphia 76ers qualified for the playoffs for the first time since 2012.
- The Miami Heat returned to the NBA playoffs after a one-season absence.

=== First Round ===
- With their first round sweep of the Portland Trail Blazers, the New Orleans Pelicans won their first playoff series since 2008.
- Game 5 of the Sixers–Heat series was Dwyane Wade's final NBA postseason game. He would retire the following season.
- In Game 5 of their series against the Utah Jazz, the Oklahoma City Thunder rallied from a 25-point deficit in the second half to win the game 107–99.
- Game 7 between the Boston Celtics and the Milwaukee Bucks ensured a 19th–straight postseason in which at least one Game 7 was played; 1999 was the most recent postseason to not feature a Game 7.
- Game 6 of the Celtics–Bucks series was the last game played at the Bradley Center.
- For the first time in his career, LeBron James was forced to play a Game 7 in the first round of the playoffs, courtesy of the Indiana Pacers’ 121–87 victory in Game 6 over the Cleveland Cavaliers. This would be their last postseason victory until game 2 of the 2024 postseason against the Milwaukee Bucks.

=== Conference semifinals ===
- Game 2 of the Raptors–Cavaliers series was the last game before the Air Canada Centre was renamed to Scotiabank Arena.
- Game 3 of the Raptors–Cavaliers series was extremely notable for LeBron James’ floater to win the game 105–103 for the Cleveland Cavaliers.
- The Toronto Raptors became the first top seeded team to be swept from the conference semifinals, earning LeBron James the nickname "LeBronto", as well as the first top seed to be swept out of the playoffs since the 2015 Atlanta Hawks (who were also swept by the Cleveland Cavaliers). As of 2026, this is the last time the top seed in a conference has been swept out of the NBA playoffs.
- With their Game 5 win over the Utah Jazz, the Houston Rockets made the Western Conference finals for the first time since 2015.

=== Conference finals ===
- For the first time since 1994, the Houston Rockets held home court advantage in the Western Conference finals.
- Game 6 and Game 7 of the Western Conference finals was extremely notable for the Golden State Warriors’ second half comebacks to beat the Houston Rockets. The Warriors trailed the Rockets by as many as 17 points in Game 6 and as many as 11 points in Game 7 before coming back to win 115–86 and 101–92, respectively.
- Klay Thompson helped the Warriors force Game 7 by putting up another notable performance in Game 6. He dropped 35 to defeat the Houston Rockets.
- The Houston Rockets set an NBA record 27 missed threes in Game 7. James Harden, Trevor Ariza and Eric Gordon shot a combined 4-34 from 3.
- For the first time since 1979 both Conference finals series went to a deciding Game 7.
- In both Conference finals series, the road teams won both Game 7s. In the other two instances in which both Conference finals series went to a Game 7, the home team won each Conference finals Game 7 in the 1963 and 1979 Playoffs.
- The Cleveland Cavaliers and Golden State Warriors advanced to their fourth consecutive NBA Finals appearances. This also marked the first time the same two NBA teams met in the NBA Finals four seasons in a row.

=== NBA Finals ===
- Game 1 of the NBA Finals was notable for JR Smith's infamous play that cost the Cleveland Cavaliers the game in the waning moments in regulation (they would lose in Overtime to the Golden State Warriors). LeBron James scored 51 points in the losing effort.
- Game 4 of the 2018 NBA Finals was the last game LeBron James played as a member of the Cleveland Cavaliers.
- This was also the first time a team was swept in the NBA Finals since 2007. Like in 2007, the Cleveland Cavaliers were also the team that got swept in the 2018 NBA Finals.
- The Golden State Warriors won their second consecutive championship, their third in four seasons.

== Format ==
Within each conference, the eight teams with the most wins qualify for the playoffs. The seedings are based on each team's record.

Each conference's bracket is fixed; there is no reseeding. All rounds are best-of-seven series; the team that has four wins advances to the next round. All rounds, including the NBA Finals, are in a 2–2–1–1–1 format. Home court advantage in any round belong to the higher-seeded team, who has the better regular season record (number 1 is the highest). If two teams with the same record meet in a round, standard tiebreaker rules are used. The rule for determining home court advantage in the NBA Finals is winning percentage, then head-to-head record, followed by intra-conference record.

== Playoff qualifying ==
On March 7, 2018, the Toronto Raptors became the first team to clinch a playoff spot. On March 30, 2018, the Houston Rockets clinched the Western Conference ending a three-year run by the Golden State Warriors as the top seed. The Rockets clinched the best record in the NBA a day later on March 31, 2018. For the first time since the 1996–97 NBA season, two teams played their last game against each other for the 8th and final spot in the playoffs. The Minnesota Timberwolves defeated the Denver Nuggets 112–106 in overtime to clinch the final playoff seed in the West. This also ended Minnesota's 13-year drought without a playoff appearance having last played in 2003–04 season. For the first time since the 2010–11 NBA season, the Los Angeles Clippers would miss the postseason following a loss to the Denver Nuggets on April 7, 2018. This is the first time since 1960 that none of the teams from New York, Los Angeles, or Chicago made the playoffs. For the first time since 2005, both the Lakers and Clippers missed the playoffs in the same season.

=== Eastern Conference ===
Seed	Team	Record	Clinched			
Seed	Team	Record	Playoff berth	Division title	Best record in conference	Best record in NBA
1	Toronto Raptors	59–23	March 7	April 6	April 6	—
2	Boston Celtics	55–27	March 8	—	—	—
3	Philadelphia 76ers	52–30	March 26	—	—	—
4	Cleveland Cavaliers	50–32	March 22	April 10	—	—
5	Indiana Pacers	48–34	March 25	—	—	—
6	Miami Heat	44–38	April 3	April 11	—	—
7	Milwaukee Bucks	44–38	April 4	—	—	—
8	Washington Wizards	43–39	March 31	—	—	—

=== Western Conference ===
Seed	Team	Record	Clinched			
Seed	Team	Record	Playoff berth	Division title	Best record in conference	Best record in NBA
1	Houston Rockets	65–17	March 11	March 15	March 29	March 29
2	Golden State Warriors	58–24	March 12	March 15	—	—
3	Portland Trail Blazers	49–33	April 1	April 11	—	—
4	Oklahoma City Thunder	48–34	April 9	—	—	—
5	Utah Jazz	48–34	April 8	—	—	—
6	New Orleans Pelicans	48–34	April 10	—	—	—
7	San Antonio Spurs	47–35	April 10	—	—	—
8	Minnesota Timberwolves	47–35	April 11	—	—	—

== Bracket ==
Teams in bold advanced to the next round. The numbers to the left of each team indicate the team's seeding in its conference, and the numbers to the right indicate the number of games the team won in that round. The division champions are marked by an asterisk. Teams with home court advantage, the higher seeded team, are shown in italics.

First round	Conference semifinals
**E1**	**Toronto***	**4**
E8	Washington	2
E1	Toronto*	0
**E4**	**Cleveland***	**4**
**E4**	**Cleveland***	**4**
E5	Indiana	3
**Eastern Conference**
**E3**	**Philadelphia**	**4**
E6	Miami*	1
E3	Philadelphia	1
**E2**	**Boston**	**4**
**E2**	**Boston**	**4**
E7	Milwaukee	3
**W1**	**Houston***	**4**
W8	Minnesota	1
**W1**	**Houston***	**4**
W5	Utah	1
W4	Oklahoma City	2
**W5**	**Utah**	**4**
**Western Conference**
W3	Portland*	0
**W6**	**New Orleans**	**4**
W6	New Orleans	1
**W2**	**Golden State***	**4**
**W2**	**Golden State***	**4**
W7	San Antonio	1

Conference finals
**E4**	**Cleveland***	**4**
E2	Boston	3
W1	Houston*	3
**W2**	**Golden State***	**4**

NBA Finals
E4	Cleveland*	0
**W2**	**Golden State***	**4**

- * Division winner
- **Bold** Series winner
- Italic Team with home-court advantage

== First round ==
Note: Times are EDT (UTC−4) as listed by the NBA. If the venue is located in a different time zone, the local time is also given.

=== Eastern Conference first round ===
==== (1) Toronto Raptors vs. (8) Washington Wizards ====
ESPN, SN1

April 14
5:30 pm

Boxscore

Washington Wizards 106, Toronto Raptors 114
Scoring by quarter: 23–28, 36–27, 26–31, 21–28
Pts: John Wall 23; Rebs: Markieff Morris 11; Asts: John Wall 15	Pts: Serge Ibaka 23; Rebs: Serge Ibaka 12; Asts: Kyle Lowry 9
Toronto leads series, 1–0

Air Canada Centre, Toronto, Ontario
Attendance: 19,937
Referees: Scott Foster, Tony Brothers, Pat Fraher

NBA TV, TSN

April 17
7:00 pm

Boxscore

Washington Wizards 119, Toronto Raptors 130
Scoring by quarter: 27–44, 31–32, 32–24, 29–30
Pts: John Wall 29; Rebs: Kelly Oubre Jr. 5 Asts: John Wall 9	Pts: DeMar DeRozan 37; Rebs: Jonas Valančiūnas 14; Asts: Kyle Lowry 12
Toronto leads series, 2–0

Air Canada Centre, Toronto, Ontario
Attendance: 20,242
Referees: Mike Callahan, Courtney Kirkland, Tom Washington

ESPN2, TSN

April 20
8:00 pm

Boxscore

Toronto Raptors 103, Washington Wizards 122
Scoring by quarter: 29–30, 32–39, 21–32, 21–21
Pts: DeMar DeRozan 23; Rebs: Serge Ibaka 6 Asts: Kyle Lowry 8	Pts: Beal, Wall 28 each Rebs: Otto Porter 8 Asts: John Wall 14
Toronto leads series, 2–1

Capital One Arena, Washington, D.C.
Attendance: 20,356
Referees: Ken Mauer, James Williams, Gary Zielinski

TNT, SN1

April 22
6:00 pm

Boxscore

Toronto Raptors 98, Washington Wizards 106
Scoring by quarter: 30–22, 21–18, 29–40, 18–26
Pts: DeMar DeRozan 35; Rebs: Serge Ibaka 10; Asts: DeMar DeRozan 6	Pts: Bradley Beal 31; Rebs: three players 6 each Asts: John Wall 14
Series tied, 2–2

Capital One Arena, Washington, D.C.
Attendance: 20,356
Referees: Derrick Stafford, Derrick Collins, Josh Tiven

NBA TV, TSN

April 25
7:00 pm

Boxscore

Washington Wizards 98, Toronto Raptors 108
Scoring by quarter: 24–23, 23–25, 31–31, 20–29
Pts: John Wall 26; Rebs: Marcin Gortat 12; Asts: John Wall 9	Pts: DeMar DeRozan 32; Rebs: Jonas Valančiūnas 13; Asts: Kyle Lowry 10
Toronto leads series, 3–2

Air Canada Centre, Toronto, Ontario
Attendance: 19,987
Referees: Marc Davis, Mark Ayotte, John Goble

NBA TV/ESPNews, SN1

April 27
7:00 pm

Boxscore

Toronto Raptors 102, Washington Wizards 92
Scoring by quarter: 20–30, 30–23, 23–25, 29–14
Pts: Kyle Lowry 24; Rebs: Jonas Valančiūnas 12; Asts: Kyle Lowry 6	Pts: Bradley Beal 32; Rebs: Markieff Morris 15; Asts: John Wall 8
Toronto wins series, 4–2

Capital One Arena, Washington, D.C.
Attendance: 20,356
Referees: James Capers, Sean Corbin, Zach Zarba

Regular-season series
Tied 2–2 in the regular-season series

November 5, 2017

Recap

Washington Wizards 107, Toronto Raptors 96

Air Canada Centre, Toronto, Ontario

November 19, 2017

Recap

Washington Wizards 91, Toronto Raptors 100

Air Canada Centre, Toronto, Ontario

February 1, 2018

Recap

Toronto Raptors 119, Washington Wizards 122

Capital One Arena, Washington, D.C.

March 2, 2018

Recap

Toronto Raptors 102, Washington Wizards 95

Capital One Arena, Washington, D.C.

This was the second playoff meeting between these two teams, with the Wizards winning the first meeting in 2015.

Previous playoffs series
Washington leads 1–0 in all-time playoff series

2015

Toronto Raptors 0, Washington Wizards 4

2015 Eastern Conference First Round

==== (2) Boston Celtics vs. (7) Milwaukee Bucks ====
TNT

April 15
1:00 pm

Boxscore

Milwaukee Bucks 107, Boston Celtics 113 (OT)
Scoring by quarter: 17–29, 30–15, 19–26, 33–29, Overtime: 8–14
Pts: Giannis Antetokounmpo 35; Rebs: Giannis Antetokounmpo 13; Asts: Giannis Antetokounmpo 7	Pts: Al Horford 24; Rebs: Al Horford 12; Asts: three players 4 each
Boston leads series, 1–0

TD Garden, Boston, Massachusetts
Attendance: 18,624
Referees: Mike Callahan, Brian Forte, Jason Phillips

TNT

April 17
8:00 pm

Boxscore

Milwaukee Bucks 106, Boston Celtics 120
Scoring by quarter: 22–33, 29–27, 24–30, 31–30
Pts: Giannis Antetokounmpo 30; Rebs: Giannis Antetokounmpo 9 Asts: Giannis Antetokounmpo 8	Pts: Jaylen Brown 30; Rebs: Jayson Tatum 7 Asts: Terry Rozier 8
Boston leads series, 2–0

TD Garden, Boston, Massachusetts
Attendance: 18,624
Referees: Marc Davis, Mark Ayotte, Sean Wright

ESPN

April 20
9:30 pm (8:30 pm CDT)

Boxscore

Boston Celtics 92, Milwaukee Bucks 116
Scoring by quarter: 12–27, 23–31, 32–27, 25–31
Pts: Al Horford 16; Rebs: Greg Monroe 12; Asts: Terry Rozier 9	Pts: Khris Middleton 23; Rebs: Khris Middleton 8 Asts: Khris Middleton 7
Boston leads series, 2–1

Bradley Center, Milwaukee, Wisconsin
Attendance: 18,717
Referees: Scott Foster, Sean Corbin, Courtney Kirkland

ABC

April 22
1:00 pm (12:00 pm CDT)

Boxscore

Boston Celtics 102, Milwaukee Bucks 104
Scoring by quarter: 17–24, 18–27, 32–24, 35–29
Pts: Jaylen Brown 34; Rebs: Aron Baynes 11; Asts: Terry Rozier 8	Pts: Giannis Antetokounmpo 27; Rebs: Antetokounmpo, Parker 7 each Asts: Antetokounmpo, Bledsoe 5 each
Series tied, 2–2

Bradley Center, Milwaukee, Wisconsin
Attendance: 18,717
Referees: Ed Malloy, Brent Barnaky, Tom Washington

NBA TV

April 24
7:00 pm

Boxscore

Milwaukee Bucks 87, Boston Celtics 92
Scoring by quarter: 15–23, 22–25, 24–24, 26–20
Pts: Khris Middleton 23; Rebs: Giannis Antetokounmpo 10; Asts: Giannis Antetokounmpo 9	Pts: Al Horford 22; Rebs: Al Horford 14; Asts: Terry Rozier 5
Boston leads series, 3–2

TD Garden, Boston, Massachusetts
Attendance: 18,624
Referees: Ken Mauer, Pat Fraher, James Williams

TNT

April 26
8:00 pm (7:00 pm CDT)

Boxscore

Boston Celtics 86, Milwaukee Bucks 97
Scoring by quarter: 24–22, 15–26, 26–26, 21–23
Pts: Jayson Tatum 22; Rebs: Al Horford 10; Asts: Terry Rozier 5	Pts: Giannis Antetokounmpo 31; Rebs: Giannis Antetokounmpo 14; Asts: Matthew Dellavedova 6
Series tied, 3–3

Bradley Center, Milwaukee, Wisconsin
Attendance: 18,717
Referees: Mike Callahan, Tony Brothers, David Guthrie

TNT

April 28
8:00 pm

Boxscore

Milwaukee Bucks 96, Boston Celtics 112
Scoring by quarter: 17–30, 25–20, 25–31, 29–31
Pts: Khris Middleton 32; Rebs: Giannis Antetokounmpo 9 Asts: Giannis Antetokounmpo 5	Pts: Horford, Rozier 26 each Rebs: Al Horford 8 Asts: Terry Rozier 9
Boston wins series, 4–3

TD Garden, Boston, Massachusetts
Attendance: 18,624
Referees: Derrick Stafford, John Goble, Josh Tiven

Regular-season series
Tied 2–2 in the regular-season series

October 18, 2017

Recap

Milwaukee Bucks 108, Boston Celtics 100

TD Garden, Boston, Massachusetts

October 26, 2017

Recap

Boston Celtics 96, Milwaukee Bucks 89

UW–Milwaukee Panther Arena, Milwaukee, Wisconsin

December 4, 2017

Recap

Milwaukee Bucks 100, Boston Celtics 111

TD Garden, Boston, Massachusetts

April 3, 2018

Recap

Boston Celtics 102, Milwaukee Bucks 106

Bradley Center, Milwaukee, Wisconsin

This was the sixth playoff meeting between these two teams, with the Celtics winning four of the first five meetings.

Previous playoff series
Boston leads 4–1 in all-time playoff series

1974

Boston Celtics 4, Milwaukee Bucks 3

1974 NBA Finals

1983

Boston Celtics 0, Milwaukee Bucks 4

1983 Eastern Conference semifinals

1984

Boston Celtics 4, Milwaukee Bucks 1

1984 Eastern Conference finals

1986

Boston Celtics 4, Milwaukee Bucks 0

1986 Eastern Conference finals

1987

Boston Celtics 4, Milwaukee Bucks 3

1987 Eastern Conference semifinals

==== (3) Philadelphia 76ers vs. (6) Miami Heat ====
ESPN

April 14
8:00 pm

Boxscore

Miami Heat 103, Philadelphia 76ers 130
Scoring by quarter: 35–29, 25–27, 18–34, 25–40
Pts: Kelly Olynyk 26; Rebs: Olynyk, Winslow 7 each Asts: Kelly Olynyk 5	Pts: JJ Redick 28; Rebs: Ersan İlyasova 14; Asts: Ben Simmons 14
Philadelphia leads series, 1–0

Wells Fargo Center, Philadelphia, Pennsylvania
Attendance: 20,617
Referees: Marc Davis, Bill Kennedy, Bill Spooner

TNT

April 16
8:00 pm

Boxscore

Miami Heat 113, Philadelphia 76ers 103
Scoring by quarter: 22–29, 34–13, 30–33, 27–28
Pts: Dwyane Wade 28; Rebs: Johnson, Wade 7 each Asts: Kelly Olynyk 6	Pts: Ben Simmons 24; Rebs: Ersan İlyasova 11; Asts: Ben Simmons 8
Series tied, 1–1

Wells Fargo Center, Philadelphia, Pennsylvania
Attendance: 20,753
Referees: Scott Foster, Tony Brothers, Karl Lane

TNT

April 19
7:00 pm

Boxscore

Philadelphia 76ers 128, Miami Heat 108
Scoring by quarter: 37–33, 26–31, 33–30, 32–14
Pts: Joel Embiid 23; Rebs: Ben Simmons 12; Asts: Ben Simmons 7	Pts: Goran Dragić 23; Rebs: Justise Winslow 10; Asts: Goran Dragić 8
Philadelphia leads series, 2–1

American Airlines Arena, Miami, Florida
Attendance: 19,812
Referees: James Capers, Tony Brown, Kane Fitzgerald

TNT

April 21
2:30 pm

Boxscore

Philadelphia 76ers 106, Miami Heat 102
Scoring by quarter: 26–26, 30–35, 23–22, 27–19
Pts: JJ Redick 24; Rebs: Ben Simmons 13; Asts: Ben Simmons 10	Pts: Dwyane Wade 25; Rebs: Hassan Whiteside 13; Asts: Josh Richardson 7
Philadelphia leads series, 3–1

American Airlines Arena, Miami, Florida
Attendance: 19,804
Referees: Mike Callahan, Jason Phillips, Kevin Scott

TNT

April 24
8:00 pm

Boxscore

Miami Heat 91, Philadelphia 76ers 104
Scoring by quarter: 21–23, 25–23, 20–34, 25–24
Pts: Kelly Olynyk 18; Rebs: Kelly Olynyk 8 Asts: Kelly Olynyk 6	Pts: JJ Redick 27; Rebs: Joel Embiid 12; Asts: Ben Simmons 6
Philadelphia wins series, 4–1

Wells Fargo Center, Philadelphia, Pennsylvania
Attendance: 21,171
Referees: Derrick Stafford, Eric Lewis, Josh Tiven

With the win, the Sixers won their first playoff series since 2012.

Regular-season series
Tied 2–2 in the regular-season series

February 2, 2018

Recap

Miami Heat 97, Philadelphia 76ers 103

Wells Fargo Center, Philadelphia, Pennsylvania

February 14, 2018

Recap

Miami Heat 102, Philadelphia 76ers 104

Wells Fargo Center, Philadelphia, Pennsylvania

February 27, 2018

Recap

Philadelphia 76ers 101, Miami Heat 102

American Airlines Arena, Miami, Florida

March 8, 2018

Recap

Philadelphia 76ers 99, Miami Heat 108

American Airlines Arena, Miami, Florida

This was the second playoff meeting between these two teams, with the Heat winning the first meeting.

Previous playoffs series
Miami leads 1–0 in all-time playoff series

2011

Philadelphia 76ers 1, Miami Heat 4

2011 Eastern Conference First Round

==== (4) Cleveland Cavaliers vs. (5) Indiana Pacers ====
ABC

April 15
3:30 pm

Boxscore

Indiana Pacers 98, Cleveland Cavaliers 80
Scoring by quarter: 33–14, 22–24, 18–27, 25–15
Pts: Victor Oladipo 32; Rebs: Myles Turner 8 Asts: Darren Collison 6	Pts: LeBron James 24; Rebs: Kevin Love 17; Asts: LeBron James 12
Indiana leads series, 1–0

Quicken Loans Arena, Cleveland, Ohio
Attendance: 20,562
Referees: Zach Zarba, Bennie Adams, John Goble

TNT

April 18
7:00 pm

Boxscore

Indiana Pacers 97, Cleveland Cavaliers 100
Scoring by quarter: 18–33, 28–25, 21–16, 30–26
Pts: Victor Oladipo 22; Rebs: Thaddeus Young 6 Asts: Collison, Oladipo 6 each	Pts: LeBron James 46; Rebs: LeBron James 12; Asts: LeBron James 5
Series tied, 1–1

Quicken Loans Arena, Cleveland, Ohio
Attendance: 20,562
Referees: Ed Malloy, David Guthrie, Eric Lewis

ESPN

April 20
7:00 pm

Boxscore

Cleveland Cavaliers 90, Indiana Pacers 92
Scoring by quarter: 31–20, 26–20, 12–23, 21–29
Pts: LeBron James 28; Rebs: LeBron James 12; Asts: LeBron James 8	Pts: Bojan Bogdanović 30; Rebs: Myles Turner 10; Asts: Victor Oladipo 7
Indiana leads series, 2–1

Bankers Life Fieldhouse, Indianapolis, Indiana
Attendance: 17,923
Referees: Derrick Stafford, Derrick Collins, Josh Tiven

TNT

April 22
8:30 pm

Boxscore

Cleveland Cavaliers 104, Indiana Pacers 100
Scoring by quarter: 30–24, 30–26, 20–28, 24–22
Pts: LeBron James 32; Rebs: LeBron James 13; Asts: LeBron James 7	Pts: Domantas Sabonis 19; Rebs: Thaddeus Young 16; Asts: Darren Collison 8
Series tied, 2–2

Bankers Life Fieldhouse, Indianapolis, Indiana
Attendance: 17,923
Referees: Ken Mauer, Pat Fraher, Rodney Mott

TNT

April 25
7:00 pm

Boxscore

Indiana Pacers 95, Cleveland Cavaliers 98
Scoring by quarter: 25–23, 31–26, 17–32, 22–17
Pts: Domantas Sabonis 22; Rebs: Victor Oladipo 12; Asts: Cory Joseph 6	Pts: LeBron James 44; Rebs: James, Love 10 each Asts: LeBron James 8
Cleveland leads series, 3–2

Quicken Loans Arena, Cleveland, Ohio
Attendance: 20,562
Referees: James Capers, Bill Kennedy, Bill Spooner

LeBron James capped off his heroic Game 5 performance with a game-winning 3 at the buzzer to put the Cavaliers up 3–2 in the series. This was the fourth time James has hit a game-winning buzzer beater in the playoffs.

ESPN

April 27
8:00 pm

Boxscore

Cleveland Cavaliers 87, Indiana Pacers 121
Scoring by quarter: 26–29, 21–28, 20–35, 20–29
Pts: LeBron James 22; Rebs: Kevin Love 7 Asts: LeBron James 7	Pts: Victor Oladipo 28; Rebs: Victor Oladipo 13; Asts: Victor Oladipo 10
Series tied, 3–3

Bankers Life Fieldhouse, Indianapolis, Indiana
Attendance: 17,923
Referees: Marc Davis, Jason Phillips, Sean Wright

ABC

April 29
1:00 pm

Boxscore

Indiana Pacers 101, Cleveland Cavaliers 105
Scoring by quarter: 19–31, 24–23, 31–22, 27–29
Pts: Victor Oladipo 30; Rebs: Victor Oladipo 12; Asts: Victor Oladipo 6	Pts: LeBron James 45; Rebs: Tristan Thompson 10; Asts: LeBron James 7
Cleveland wins series, 4–3

Quicken Loans Arena, Cleveland, Ohio
Attendance: 20,562
Referees: Scott Foster, Tony Brothers, Kane Fitzgerald

Regular-season series
Indiana won 3–1 in the regular-season series

November 1, 2017

Recap

Indiana Pacers 124, Cleveland Cavaliers 107

Quicken Loans Arena, Cleveland, Ohio

December 8, 2017

Recap

Cleveland Cavaliers 102, Indiana Pacers 106

Bankers Life Fieldhouse, Indianapolis, Indiana

January 12, 2018

Recap

Cleveland Cavaliers 95, Indiana Pacers 97

Bankers Life Fieldhouse, Indianapolis, Indiana

January 26, 2018

Recap

Indiana Pacers 108, Cleveland Cavaliers 115

Quicken Loans Arena, Cleveland, Ohio

This was the third playoff meeting between these two teams, with each team winning one series.

Previous playoffs series
Tied 1–1 in all-time playoff series

1998

Cleveland Cavaliers 1, Indiana Pacers 3

1998 Eastern Conference First Round

2017

Indiana Pacers 0, Cleveland Cavaliers 4

2017 Eastern Conference First Round

- This is the most recent playoff series between the Cavaliers & Pacers until 2025.

=== Western Conference first round ===
==== (1) Houston Rockets vs. (8) Minnesota Timberwolves ====
TNT

April 15
9:00 pm (8:00 pm CDT)

Boxscore

Minnesota Timberwolves 101, Houston Rockets 104
Scoring by quarter: 21–27, 26–27, 25–22, 29–28
Pts: Andrew Wiggins 18; Rebs: Karl-Anthony Towns 12; Asts: Jeff Teague 8	Pts: James Harden 44; Rebs: Clint Capela 12; Asts: James Harden 8
Houston leads series, 1–0

Toyota Center, Houston, Texas
Attendance: 18,055
Referees: Ken Mauer, Tony Brown, James Williams

TNT

April 18
9:30 pm (8:30 pm CDT)

Boxscore

Minnesota Timberwolves 82, Houston Rockets 102
Scoring by quarter: 23–18, 17–37, 18–25, 24–22
Pts: Nemanja Bjelica 16; Rebs: Karl-Anthony Towns 10; Asts: Jones, Wiggins 3 each	Pts: Chris Paul 27; Rebs: Clint Capela 16; Asts: Chris Paul 8
Houston leads series, 2–0

Toyota Center, Houston, Texas
Attendance: 18,055
Referees: Derrick Stafford, Pat Fraher, Mark Lindsay

ESPN

April 21
7:30 pm (6:30 pm CDT)

Boxscore

Houston Rockets 105, Minnesota Timberwolves 121
Scoring by quarter: 28–27, 23–25, 24–35, 30–34
Pts: James Harden 29; Rebs: Clint Capela 11; Asts: James Harden 7	Pts: Jimmy Butler 28; Rebs: Karl-Anthony Towns 16; Asts: Jeff Teague 8
Houston leads series, 2–1

Target Center, Minneapolis, Minnesota
Attendance: 18,978
Referees: Marc Davis, Kevin Cutler, Bill Kennedy

TNT

April 23
8:00 pm (7:00 pm CDT)

Boxscore

Houston Rockets 119, Minnesota Timberwolves 100
Scoring by quarter: 21–21, 29–28, 50–20, 19–31
Pts: James Harden 36; Rebs: Clint Capela 17; Asts: Chris Paul 6	Pts: Karl-Anthony Towns 22; Rebs: Karl-Anthony Towns 15; Asts: Butler, Teague 5 each
Houston leads series, 3–1

Target Center, Minneapolis, Minnesota
Attendance: 18,978
Referees: James Capers, Mark Ayotte, David Guthrie

TNT

April 25
9:30 pm (8:30 pm CDT)

Boxscore

Minnesota Timberwolves 104, Houston Rockets 122
Scoring by quarter: 26–25, 33–30, 15–30, 30–37
Pts: Karl-Anthony Towns 23; Rebs: Karl-Anthony Towns 14; Asts: Jeff Teague 7	Pts: Clint Capela 26; Rebs: Clint Capela 15; Asts: James Harden 12
Houston wins series, 4–1

Toyota Center, Houston, Texas
Attendance: 18,055
Referees: Zach Zarba, Brian Forte, Sean Wright

Regular-season series
Houston won 4–0 in the regular-season series

January 18, 2018

Recap

Minnesota Timberwolves 98, Houston Rockets 116

Toyota Center, Houston, Texas

February 13, 2018

Recap

Houston Rockets 126, Minnesota Timberwolves 108

Target Center, Minneapolis, Minnesota

February 23, 2018

Recap

Minnesota Timberwolves 102, Houston Rockets 120

Toyota Center, Houston, Texas

March 18, 2018

Recap

Houston Rockets 129, Minnesota Timberwolves 120

Target Center, Minneapolis, Minnesota

This was the second playoff meeting between these two teams, with the Rockets winning the first meeting.

Previous playoffs series
Houston leads 1–0 in all-time playoff series

1997

Minnesota Timberwolves 0, Houston Rockets 3

1997 Western Conference First Round

==== (2) Golden State Warriors vs. (7) San Antonio Spurs ====
ABC

April 14
3:00 pm (12:00 pm PDT)

Boxscore

San Antonio Spurs 92, Golden State Warriors 113
Scoring by quarter: 17–28, 24–29, 22–29, 29–27
Pts: Rudy Gay 15; Rebs: Rudy Gay 6 Asts: Pau Gasol 4	Pts: Klay Thompson 27; Rebs: Durant, Green 8 each Asts: Draymond Green 11
Golden State leads series, 1–0

Oracle Arena, Oakland, California
Attendance: 19,596
Referees: James Capers, Kane Fitzgerald, Ron Garretson

TNT

April 16
10:30 pm (7:30 pm PDT)

Boxscore

San Antonio Spurs 101, Golden State Warriors 116
Scoring by quarter: 25–23, 28–24, 22–33, 26–36
Pts: LaMarcus Aldridge 34; Rebs: LaMarcus Aldridge 12; Asts: five players 3 each	Pts: Kevin Durant 32; Rebs: Iguodala, McGee 7 each Asts: Durant, Green 6 each
Golden State leads series, 2–0

Oracle Arena, Oakland, California
Attendance: 19,596
Referees: Ed Malloy, Brent Barnaky, Eric Lewis

TNT

April 19
9:30 pm (6:30 pm PDT)

Boxscore

Golden State Warriors 110, San Antonio Spurs 97
Scoring by quarter: 26–23, 26–23, 32–26, 26–25
Pts: Kevin Durant 26; Rebs: Kevin Durant 9 Asts: Draymond Green 7	Pts: LaMarcus Aldridge 18; Rebs: LaMarcus Aldridge 10; Asts: Aldridge, Murray 4 each
Golden State leads series, 3–0

AT&T Center, San Antonio, Texas
Attendance: 18,418
Referees: Zach Zarba, Rodney Mott, Sean Wright

ABC

April 22
3:30 pm (12:30 pm PDT)

Boxscore

Golden State Warriors 90, San Antonio Spurs 103
Scoring by quarter: 22–30, 20–26, 29–21, 19–26
Pts: Kevin Durant 34; Rebs: Draymond Green 18; Asts: Draymond Green 9	Pts: LaMarcus Aldridge 22; Rebs: LaMarcus Aldridge 10; Asts: Ginóbili, Mills 5 each
Golden State leads series, 3–1

AT&T Center, San Antonio, Texas
Attendance: 18,418
Referees: Scott Foster, Tony Brothers, Brian Forte

TNT

April 24
10:30 pm (7:30 pm PDT)

Boxscore

San Antonio Spurs 91, Golden State Warriors 99
Scoring by quarter: 20–22, 18–27, 27–30, 26–20
Pts: LaMarcus Aldridge 30; Rebs: LaMarcus Aldridge 12; Asts: Manu Ginóbili 7	Pts: Kevin Durant 25; Rebs: Draymond Green 19; Asts: Draymond Green 7
Golden State wins series, 4–1

Oracle Arena, Oakland, California
Attendance: 19,596
Referees: Mike Callahan, Tony Brown, Jason Phillips

- Game 5 is Manu Ginóbili's final NBA game.

Regular-season series
Golden State won 3–1 in the regular-season series

November 2, 2017

Recap

Golden State Warriors 112, San Antonio Spurs 92

AT&T Center, San Antonio, Texas

February 10, 2018

Recap

San Antonio Spurs 105, Golden State Warriors 122

Oracle Arena, Oakland, California

March 8, 2018

Recap

San Antonio Spurs 107, Golden State Warriors 110

Oracle Arena, Oakland, California

March 19, 2018

Recap

Golden State Warriors 75, San Antonio Spurs 89

AT&T Center, San Antonio, Texas

This was the fourth playoff meeting between these two teams, with the Warriors winning two of the first three meetings.

Previous playoff series
Golden State leads 2–1 in all-time playoff series

1991

Golden State Warriors 3, San Antonio Spurs 1

1991 Western Conference First Round

2013

Golden State Warriors 2, San Antonio Spurs 4

2013 Western Conference semifinals

2017

Golden State Warriors 4, San Antonio Spurs 0

2017 Western Conference finals

==== (3) Portland Trail Blazers vs. (6) New Orleans Pelicans ====
ESPN

April 14
10:30 pm (7:30 pm PDT)

Boxscore

New Orleans Pelicans 97, Portland Trail Blazers 95
Scoring by quarter: 21–18, 24–18, 30–27, 22–32
Pts: Anthony Davis 35; Rebs: Anthony Davis 14; Asts: Rajon Rondo 17	Pts: CJ McCollum 19; Rebs: Ed Davis 13; Asts: Damian Lillard 7
New Orleans leads series, 1–0

Moda Center, Portland, Oregon
Attendance: 19,882
Referees: Ed Malloy, Eric Lewis, Mark Lindsay

TNT

April 17
10:30 pm (7:30 pm PDT)

Boxscore

New Orleans Pelicans 111, Portland Trail Blazers 102
Scoring by quarter: 25–23, 29–36, 33–19, 24–24
Pts: Jrue Holiday 33; Rebs: Anthony Davis 13; Asts: Holiday, Rondo 9 each	Pts: CJ McCollum 22; Rebs: Al-Farouq Aminu 15; Asts: CJ McCollum 6
New Orleans leads series, 2–0

Moda Center, Portland, Oregon
Attendance: 20,066
Referees: Zach Zarba, Sean Corbin, John Goble

NBA TV

April 19
9:00 pm (8:00 pm CDT)

Boxscore

Portland Trail Blazers 102, New Orleans Pelicans 119
Scoring by quarter: 20–36, 25–28, 25–27, 32–28
Pts: CJ McCollum 22; Rebs: Al-Farouq Aminu 8 Asts: Maurice Harkless 4	Pts: Nikola Mirotić 30; Rebs: Anthony Davis 11; Asts: Rajon Rondo 11
New Orleans leads series, 3–0

Smoothie King Center, New Orleans, Louisiana
Attendance: 18,551
Referees: Mike Callahan, Jason Phillips, Tom Washington

TNT

April 21
5:00 pm (4:00 pm CDT)

Boxscore

Portland Trail Blazers 123, New Orleans Pelicans 131
Scoring by quarter: 25–26, 31–32, 31–42, 36–31
Pts: CJ McCollum 38; Rebs: Jusuf Nurkić 11; Asts: Damian Lillard 6	Pts: Anthony Davis 47; Rebs: Davis, Mirotić 11 each Asts: Rajon Rondo 16
New Orleans wins series, 4–0

Smoothie King Center, New Orleans, Louisiana
Attendance: 18,544
Referees: James Capers, Kane Fitzgerald, Ron Garretson

The Pelicans completed a sweep of the Trail Blazers for their 1st series win in the playoffs since the 2008 NBA playoffs against the Dallas Mavericks as the New Orleans Hornets.

Regular-season series
Tied 2–2 in the regular-season series

October 24, 2017

Recap

New Orleans Pelicans 93, Portland Trail Blazers 103

Moda Center, Portland, Oregon

December 2, 2017

Recap

New Orleans Pelicans 123, Portland Trail Blazers 116

Moda Center, Portland, Oregon

January 12, 2018

Recap

Portland Trail Blazers 113, New Orleans Pelicans 119

Smoothie King Center, New Orleans, Louisiana

March 27, 2018

Recap

Portland Trail Blazers 107, New Orleans Pelicans 103

Smoothie King Center, New Orleans, Louisiana

This was the first playoff meeting between the Trail Blazers and Pelicans.

==== (4) Oklahoma City Thunder vs. (5) Utah Jazz ====
TNT

April 15
6:30 pm (5:30 pm CDT)

Boxscore

Utah Jazz 108, Oklahoma City Thunder 116
Scoring by quarter: 25–25, 23–29, 24–27, 36–35
Pts: Donovan Mitchell 27; Rebs: Donovan Mitchell 10; Asts: Ricky Rubio 5	Pts: Paul George 36; Rebs: Russell Westbrook 13; Asts: Russell Westbrook 8
Oklahoma City leads series, 1–0

Chesapeake Energy Arena, Oklahoma City, Oklahoma
Attendance: 18,203
Referees: Derrick Stafford, David Guthrie, Josh Tiven

NBA TV

April 18
8:00 pm (7:00 pm CDT)

Boxscore

Utah Jazz 102, Oklahoma City Thunder 95
Scoring by quarter: 26–25, 27–21, 21–33, 28–16
Pts: Donovan Mitchell 28; Rebs: Derrick Favors 16; Asts: Ricky Rubio 9	Pts: Russell Westbrook 19; Rebs: Paul George 10; Asts: Russell Westbrook 13
Series tied, 1–1

Chesapeake Energy Arena, Oklahoma City, Oklahoma
Attendance: 18,203
Referees: Ken Mauer, James Williams, Gary Zielinski

ESPN

April 21
10:00 pm (8:00 pm MDT)

Boxscore

Oklahoma City Thunder 102, Utah Jazz 115
Scoring by quarter: 30–22, 23–36, 22–31, 27–26
Pts: Paul George 23; Rebs: Russell Westbrook 11; Asts: Russell Westbrook 9	Pts: Ricky Rubio 26; Rebs: Rudy Gobert 12; Asts: Ricky Rubio 10
Utah leads series, 2–1

Vivint Smart Home Arena, Salt Lake City, Utah
Attendance: 18,306
Referees: Zach Zarba, Bennie Adams, John Goble

TNT

April 23
10:30 pm (8:30 pm MDT)

Boxscore

Oklahoma City Thunder 96, Utah Jazz 113
Scoring by quarter: 30–24, 22–34, 21–32, 23–23
Pts: Paul George 32; Rebs: Russell Westbrook 14; Asts: Russell Westbrook 3	Pts: Donovan Mitchell 33; Rebs: Rudy Gobert 10; Asts: Ricky Rubio 8
Utah leads series, 3–1

Vivint Smart Home Arena, Salt Lake City, Utah
Attendance: 18,306
Referees: Marc Davis, Bill Kennedy, Bill Spooner

NBA TV

April 25
9:30 pm (8:30 pm CDT)

Boxscore

Utah Jazz 99, Oklahoma City Thunder 107
Scoring by quarter: 34–29, 22–12, 22–37, 21–29
Pts: Jae Crowder 27; Rebs: Ricky Rubio 12; Asts: Ricky Rubio 7	Pts: Russell Westbrook 45; Rebs: Russell Westbrook 15; Asts: Russell Westbrook 7
Utah leads series, 3–2

Chesapeake Energy Arena, Oklahoma City, Oklahoma
Attendance: 18,203
Referees: Ed Malloy, Kane Fitzgerald, Tom Washington

The Thunder trailed by as much as 25 points in the 3rd quarter. However, Russell Westbrook and Paul George combined for 47 second-half points to help keep their season alive. The Thunder outscored the Jazz 61-28 since the comeback started with 8:32 left in the 3rd quarter. The 25-point rally was their largest in franchise history and one of the biggest comebacks for a team facing elimination in playoff history.

ESPN

April 27
10:30 pm (8:30 pm MDT)

Boxscore

Oklahoma City Thunder 91, Utah Jazz 96
Scoring by quarter: 22–18, 19–23, 29–37, 21–18
Pts: Russell Westbrook 46; Rebs: Steven Adams 15; Asts: Paul George 8	Pts: Donovan Mitchell 38; Rebs: Rudy Gobert 13; Asts: Joe Ingles 5
Utah wins series, 4–2

Vivint Smart Home Arena, Salt Lake City, Utah
Attendance: 18,306
Referees: Scott Foster, Ron Garretson, Eric Lewis

Regular-season series
Oklahoma City won 3–1 in the regular-season series

October 21, 2017

Recap

Oklahoma City Thunder 87, Utah Jazz 96

Vivint Smart Home Arena, Salt Lake City, Utah

December 5, 2017

Recap

Utah Jazz 94, Oklahoma City Thunder 100

Chesapeake Energy Arena, Oklahoma City, Oklahoma

December 20, 2017

Recap

Utah Jazz 79, Oklahoma City Thunder 107

Chesapeake Energy Arena, Oklahoma City, Oklahoma

December 23, 2017

Recap

Oklahoma City Thunder 103, Utah Jazz 89

Vivint Smart Home Arena, Salt Lake City, Utah

This was the fifth playoff meeting between the SuperSonics/Thunder franchise and the Jazz, but the first since the Seattle SuperSonics relocated to Oklahoma City and became the Thunder in 2008. The two teams have split their previous four playoff matchups.

Previous playoffs series
Tied 2–2 in all-time playoff series

1992

Seattle SuperSonics 1, Utah Jazz 4

1992 Western Conference semifinals

1993

Seattle SuperSonics 3, Utah Jazz 2

1993 Western Conference First Round

1996

Seattle SuperSonics 4, Utah Jazz 3

1996 Western Conference finals

2000

Seattle SuperSonics 2, Utah Jazz 3

2000 Western Conference First Round

== Conference semifinals ==
Note: Times are EDT (UTC−4) as listed by the NBA. If the venue is located in a different time zone, the local time is also given.

=== Eastern Conference semifinals ===
==== (1) Toronto Raptors vs. (4) Cleveland Cavaliers ====
TNT, TSN

May 1
8:00 pm

Boxscore

Cleveland Cavaliers 113, Toronto Raptors 112 (OT)
Scoring by quarter: 19–33, 38–27, 25–27, 23–18, Overtime: 8–7
Pts: LeBron James 26; Rebs: Kevin Love 13; Asts: LeBron James 13	Pts: DeMar DeRozan 22; Rebs: Jonas Valančiūnas 21; Asts: Kyle Lowry 10
Cleveland leads series, 1–0

Air Canada Centre, Toronto, Ontario
Attendance: 19,954
Referees: Derrick Stafford, Pat Fraher, John Goble

ESPN, SN1

May 3
6:00 pm

Boxscore

Cleveland Cavaliers 128, Toronto Raptors 110
Scoring by quarter: 26–29, 35–34, 37–24, 30–23
Pts: LeBron James 43; Rebs: Kevin Love 11; Asts: LeBron James 14	Pts: DeMar DeRozan 24; Rebs: Jonas Valančiūnas 12; Asts: Kyle Lowry 8
Cleveland leads series, 2–0

Air Canada Centre, Toronto, Ontario
Attendance: 20,127
Referees: Ken Mauer, Kane Fitzgerald, Brian Forte

ABC, SN1

May 5
8:30 pm

Boxscore

Toronto Raptors 103, Cleveland Cavaliers 105
Scoring by quarter: 19–24, 21–31, 25–24, 38–26
Pts: Kyle Lowry 27; Rebs: Jonas Valančiūnas 11; Asts: Kyle Lowry 7	Pts: LeBron James 38; Rebs: Kevin Love 16; Asts: LeBron James 7
Cleveland leads series, 3–0

Quicken Loans Arena, Cleveland, Ohio
Attendance: 20,562
Referees: Mike Callahan, Courtney Kirkland, Josh Tiven

LeBron James capped off a 38-point performance with a fadeaway bank shot floater at the buzzer to lead the Cavs to a commanding 3–0 series lead.

TNT, TSN

May 7
8:30 pm

Boxscore

Toronto Raptors 93, Cleveland Cavaliers 128
Scoring by quarter: 26–30, 21–33, 25–37, 21–28
Pts: Jonas Valančiūnas 18; Rebs: DeRozan, Valančiūnas, 5 each Asts: Kyle Lowry 10	Pts: LeBron James 29; Rebs: LeBron James 8 Asts: LeBron James 11
Cleveland wins series, 4–0

Quicken Loans Arena, Cleveland, Ohio
Attendance: 20,562
Referees: Marc Davis, Tony Brown, David Guthrie

Regular-season series
Cleveland won 2–1 in the regular-season series

January 11, 2018

Recap

Cleveland Cavaliers 99, Toronto Raptors 133

Air Canada Centre, Toronto, Ontario

March 21, 2018

Recap

Toronto Raptors 129, Cleveland Cavaliers 132

Quicken Loans Arena, Cleveland, Ohio

April 3, 2018

Recap

Toronto Raptors 106, Cleveland Cavaliers 112

Quicken Loans Arena, Cleveland, Ohio

This was the third playoff meeting between these two teams, with Cleveland winning the first two meetings.

Previous playoffs series
Cleveland leads 2–0 in all-time playoff series

2016

Toronto Raptors 2, Cleveland Cavaliers 4

2016 Eastern Conference finals

2017

Toronto Raptors 0, Cleveland Cavaliers 4

2017 Eastern Conference semifinals

- This is the most recent playoff series between the Cavaliers & Raptors until 2026.

==== (2) Boston Celtics vs. (3) Philadelphia 76ers ====
TNT

April 30
8:00 pm

Boxscore

Philadelphia 76ers 101, Boston Celtics 117
Scoring by quarter: 22–25, 23–31, 30–31, 26–30
Pts: Joel Embiid 31; Rebs: Joel Embiid 13; Asts: Ben Simmons 6	Pts: Terry Rozier 29; Rebs: Terry Rozier 8 Asts: Marcus Smart 9
Boston leads series, 1–0

TD Garden, Boston, Massachusetts
Attendance: 18,624
Referees: Marc Davis, Ed Malloy, Bill Spooner

TNT

May 3
8:30 pm

Boxscore

Philadelphia 76ers 103, Boston Celtics 108
Scoring by quarter: 31–22, 25–29, 19–28, 28–29
Pts: JJ Redick 23; Rebs: Joel Embiid 14; Asts: Ben Simmons 7	Pts: Jayson Tatum 21; Rebs: Al Horford 12; Asts: Terry Rozier 9
Boston leads series, 2–0

TD Garden, Boston, Massachusetts
Attendance: 18,624
Referees: Mike Callahan, Jason Phillips, Sean Wright

ESPN

May 5
5:00 pm

Boxscore

Boston Celtics 101, Philadelphia 76ers 98 (OT)
Scoring by quarter: 19–20, 29–31, 21–17, 20–21, Overtime: 12–9
Pts: Jayson Tatum 24; Rebs: Aron Baynes 10; Asts: Jayson Tatum 4	Pts: Joel Embiid 22; Rebs: Joel Embiid 19; Asts: Ben Simmons 8
Boston leads series, 3–0

Wells Fargo Center, Philadelphia, Pennsylvania
Attendance: 20,758
Referees: Derrick Stafford, Pat Fraher, John Goble

TNT

May 7
6:00 pm

Boxscore

Boston Celtics 92, Philadelphia 76ers 103
Scoring by quarter: 22–21, 21–26, 22–29, 27–27
Pts: Jayson Tatum 20; Rebs: Al Horford 10; Asts: Jayson Tatum 4	Pts: Dario Šarić 25; Rebs: Embiid, Simmons 13 each Asts: McConnell, Simmons 5 each
Boston leads series, 3–1

Wells Fargo Center, Philadelphia, Pennsylvania
Attendance: 20,936
Referees: Scott Foster, Tony Brothers, Sean Corbin

TNT

May 9
8:00 pm

Boxscore

Philadelphia 76ers 112, Boston Celtics 114
Scoring by quarter: 24–25, 28–36, 30–22, 30–31
Pts: Embiid, Šarić 27 each Rebs: Joel Embiid 12; Asts: McConnell, Simmons 6 each	Pts: Jayson Tatum 25; Rebs: Aron Baynes 9 Asts: Marcus Smart 6
Boston wins series, 4–1

TD Garden, Boston, Massachusetts
Attendance: 18,624
Referees: James Capers, Tom Washington, Zach Zarba

Regular-season series
Boston won 3–1 in the regular-season series

October 20, 2017

Recap

Boston Celtics 102, Philadelphia 76ers 92

Wells Fargo Center, Philadelphia, Pennsylvania

November 30, 2017

Recap

Philadelphia 76ers 97, Boston Celtics 108

TD Garden, Boston, Massachusetts

January 11, 2018

Recap

Boston Celtics 114, Philadelphia 76ers 103

The O2 Arena, London, United Kingdom

January 18, 2018

Recap

Philadelphia 76ers 89, Boston Celtics 80

TD Garden, Boston, Massachusetts

This was the 21st playoff meeting between these two teams, with the Celtics winning 12 of the first 20 meetings.

Previous playoffs series
Boston leads 12–8 in all-time playoff series

1953

Boston Celtics 2, Syracuse Nationals 0

1953 Eastern Division semifinals

1954

Boston Celtics 0, Syracuse Nationals 2

1954 Eastern Division Round Robin Semifinals

1954

Boston Celtics 0, Syracuse Nationals 2

1954 Eastern Division finals

1955

Boston Celtics 1, Syracuse Nationals 3

1955 Eastern Division finals

1956

Boston Celtics 1, Syracuse Nationals 2

1956 Eastern Division semifinals

1957

Boston Celtics 3, Syracuse Nationals 0

1957 Eastern Division finals

1959

Boston Celtics 4, Syracuse Nationals 3

1959 Eastern Division finals

1961

Boston Celtics 4, Syracuse Nationals 1

1961 Eastern Division finals

1965

Boston Celtics 4, Philadelphia 76ers 3

1965 Eastern Division finals

1966

Boston Celtics 4, Philadelphia 76ers 1

1966 Eastern Division finals

1967

Boston Celtics 1, Philadelphia 76ers 4

1967 Eastern Division finals

1968

Boston Celtics 4, Philadelphia 76ers 3

1968 Eastern Division finals

1969

Boston Celtics 4, Philadelphia 76ers 1

1969 Eastern Division semifinals

1977

Boston Celtics 3, Philadelphia 76ers 4

1977 Eastern Conference semifinals

1980

Boston Celtics 1, Philadelphia 76ers 4

1980 Eastern Conference finals

1981

Boston Celtics 4, Philadelphia 76ers 3

1981 Eastern Conference finals

1982

Boston Celtics 3, Philadelphia 76ers 4

1982 Eastern Conference finals

1985

Boston Celtics 4, Philadelphia 76ers 1

1985 Eastern Conference finals

2002

Boston Celtics 3, Philadelphia 76ers 2

2002 Eastern Conference First Round

2012

Boston Celtics 4, Philadelphia 76ers 3

2012 Eastern Conference semifinals

=== Western Conference semifinals ===
==== (1) Houston Rockets vs. (5) Utah Jazz ====
ABC

April 29
3:30 pm (2:30 pm CDT)

Boxscore

Utah Jazz 96, Houston Rockets 110
Scoring by quarter: 21–34, 18–30, 29–22, 28–24
Pts: Crowder, Mitchell 21 each Rebs: Rudy Gobert 9 Asts: Ingles, Mitchell 5 each	Pts: James Harden 41; Rebs: Clint Capela 12; Asts: James Harden 7
Houston leads series, 1–0

Toyota Center, Houston, Texas
Attendance: 18,055
Referees: James Capers, Tom Washington, Zach Zarba

TNT

May 2
8:00 pm (7:00 pm CDT)

Boxscore

Utah Jazz 116, Houston Rockets 108
Scoring by quarter: 36–28, 28–27, 22–30, 30–23
Pts: Joe Ingles 27; Rebs: Rudy Gobert 14; Asts: Donovan Mitchell 11	Pts: James Harden 32; Rebs: Clint Capela 11; Asts: James Harden 11
Series tied, 1–1

Toyota Center, Houston, Texas
Attendance: 18,055
Referees: Scott Foster, Bennie Adams, Tony Brothers

ESPN

May 4
10:30 pm (8:30 pm MDT)

Boxscore

Houston Rockets 113, Utah Jazz 92
Scoring by quarter: 39–22, 31–18, 23–25, 20–27
Pts: Gordon, Harden 25 each Rebs: Clint Capela 8 Asts: James Harden 12	Pts: Royce O'Neale 17; Rebs: Rudy Gobert 9 Asts: Raulzinho Neto 4
Houston leads series, 2–1

Vivint Smart Home Arena, Salt Lake City, Utah
Attendance: 18,306
Referees: Marc Davis, Ron Garretson, Ed Malloy

TNT

May 6
8:00 pm (6:00 pm MDT)

Boxscore

Houston Rockets 100, Utah Jazz 87
Scoring by quarter: 30–23, 28–25, 21–17, 21–22
Pts: Chris Paul 27; Rebs: Clint Capela 15; Asts: Chris Paul 6	Pts: Donovan Mitchell 25; Rebs: Rudy Gobert 10; Asts: Joe Ingles 4
Houston leads series, 3–1

Vivint Smart Home Arena, Salt Lake City, Utah
Attendance: 18,306
Referees: Ken Mauer, Bill Kennedy, James Williams

TNT

May 8
8:00 pm (7:00 pm CDT)

Boxscore

Utah Jazz 102, Houston Rockets 112
Scoring by quarter: 16–21, 30–33, 32–21, 24–37
Pts: Donovan Mitchell 24; Rebs: Rudy Gobert 9 Asts: Donovan Mitchell 9	Pts: Chris Paul 41; Rebs: Chris Paul 7 Asts: Chris Paul 10
Houston wins series, 4–1

Toyota Center, Houston, Texas
Attendance: 18,055
Referees: Mike Callahan, John Goble, Eric Lewis

Regular-season series
Houston won 4–0 in the regular-season series

November 5, 2017

Recap

Utah Jazz 110, Houston Rockets 137

Toyota Center, Houston, Texas

December 7, 2017

Recap

Houston Rockets 112, Utah Jazz 101

Vivint Smart Home Arena, Salt Lake City, Utah

December 18, 2017

Recap

Utah Jazz 99, Houston Rockets 120

Toyota Center, Houston, Texas

February 26, 2018

Recap

Houston Rockets 96, Utah Jazz 85

Vivint Smart Home Arena, Salt Lake City, Utah

This was the eighth playoff meeting between these two teams, with the Jazz winning five of the first seven meetings.

Previous playoffs series
Utah leads 5–2 in all-time playoff series

1985

Houston Rockets 2, Utah Jazz 3

1985 Western Conference First Round

1994

Houston Rockets 4, Utah Jazz 1

1994 Western Conference finals

1995

Houston Rockets 3, Utah Jazz 2

1995 Western Conference First Round

1997

Houston Rockets 2, Utah Jazz 4

1997 Western Conference finals

1998

Houston Rockets 2, Utah Jazz 3

1998 Western Conference First Round

2007

Houston Rockets 3, Utah Jazz 4

2007 Western Conference First Round

2008

Houston Rockets 2, Utah Jazz 4

2008 Western Conference First Round

==== (2) Golden State Warriors vs. (6) New Orleans Pelicans ====
TNT

April 28
10:30 pm (7:30 pm PDT)

Boxscore

New Orleans Pelicans 101, Golden State Warriors 123
Scoring by quarter: 34–35, 21–41, 19–27, 27–20
Pts: Anthony Davis 21; Rebs: Anthony Davis 10; Asts: Rajon Rondo 11	Pts: Klay Thompson 27; Rebs: Draymond Green 15; Asts: Draymond Green 11
Golden State leads series, 1–0

Oracle Arena, Oakland, California
Attendance: 19,596
Referees: Ken Mauer, Bill Kennedy, James Williams

TNT

May 1
10:30 pm (7:30 pm PDT)

Boxscore

New Orleans Pelicans 116, Golden State Warriors 121
Scoring by quarter: 29–27, 26–31, 31–30, 30–33
Pts: Anthony Davis 25; Rebs: Anthony Davis 15; Asts: Rajon Rondo 12	Pts: Kevin Durant 29; Rebs: Draymond Green 9 Asts: Draymond Green 12
Golden State leads series, 2–0

Oracle Arena, Oakland, California
Attendance: 19,596
Referees: Mike Callahan, Jason Phillips, Sean Wright

ESPN

May 4
8:00 pm (7:00 pm CDT)

Boxscore

Golden State Warriors 100, New Orleans Pelicans 119
Scoring by quarter: 21–30, 35–32, 19–30, 25–27
Pts: Klay Thompson 26; Rebs: Draymond Green 12; Asts: Draymond Green 9	Pts: Anthony Davis 33; Rebs: Anthony Davis 18; Asts: Rajon Rondo 21
Golden State leads series, 2–1

Smoothie King Center, New Orleans, Louisiana
Attendance: 18,551
Referees: Scott Foster, Mark Ayotte, Eric Lewis

ABC

May 6
3:30 pm (2:30 pm CDT)

Boxscore

Golden State Warriors 118, New Orleans Pelicans 92
Scoring by quarter: 37–22, 24–32, 33–19, 24–19
Pts: Kevin Durant 38; Rebs: Durant, Green 9 each Asts: Draymond Green 9	Pts: Anthony Davis 26; Rebs: Anthony Davis 12; Asts: Rajon Rondo 6
Golden State leads series, 3–1

Smoothie King Center, New Orleans, Louisiana
Attendance: 18,513
Referees: James Capers, Tom Washington, Zach Zarba

TNT

May 8
10:30 pm (7:30 pm PDT)

Boxscore

New Orleans Pelicans 104, Golden State Warriors 113
Scoring by quarter: 26–32, 30–27, 19–36, 29–18
Pts: Anthony Davis 34; Rebs: Anthony Davis 19; Asts: Jrue Holiday 11	Pts: Stephen Curry 28; Rebs: Draymond Green 14; Asts: Draymond Green 9
Golden State wins series, 4–1

Oracle Arena, Oakland, California
Attendance: 19,596
Referees: Derrick Stafford, Ed Malloy, Josh Tiven

Regular-season series
Golden State won 3–1 in the regular-season series

October 20, 2017

Recap

Golden State Warriors 128, New Orleans Pelicans 120

Smoothie King Center, New Orleans, Louisiana

November 25, 2017

Recap

New Orleans Pelicans 95, Golden State Warriors 110

Oracle Arena, Oakland, California

December 4, 2017

Recap

Golden State Warriors 125, New Orleans Pelicans 115

Smoothie King Center, New Orleans, Louisiana

April 7, 2018

Recap

New Orleans Pelicans 126, Golden State Warriors 120

Oracle Arena, Oakland, California

This was the second meeting in the playoffs between the two teams, with the Warriors winning the first meeting.

Previous playoffs series
Golden State leads 1–0 in all-time playoff series

2015

New Orleans Pelicans 0, Golden State Warriors 4

2015 Western Conference First Round

== Conference finals ==
Note: Times are EDT (UTC−4) as listed by the NBA. If the venue is located in a different time zone, the local time is also given.

=== Eastern Conference finals ===
==== (2) Boston Celtics vs. (4) Cleveland Cavaliers ====
ABC

May 13
3:30 pm

Boxscore

Cleveland Cavaliers 83, Boston Celtics 108
Scoring by quarter: 18–36, 17–25, 29–17, 19–30
Pts: Kevin Love 17; Rebs: Tristan Thompson 11; Asts: LeBron James 9	Pts: Jaylen Brown 23; Rebs: Marcus Morris 10; Asts: Terry Rozier 8
Boston leads series, 1–0

TD Garden, Boston, Massachusetts
Attendance: 18,624
Referees: Marc Davis, Pat Fraher, John Goble

ESPN

May 15
8:30 pm

Boxscore

Cleveland Cavaliers 94, Boston Celtics 107
Scoring by quarter: 27–23, 28–25, 22–36, 17–23
Pts: LeBron James 42; Rebs: Kevin Love 15; Asts: LeBron James 12	Pts: Jaylen Brown 23; Rebs: Al Horford 10; Asts: Marcus Smart 9
Boston leads series, 2–0

TD Garden, Boston, Massachusetts
Attendance: 18,624
Referees: Mike Callahan, Derrick Stafford, Sean Wright

ESPN

May 19
8:30 pm

Boxscore

Boston Celtics 86, Cleveland Cavaliers 116
Scoring by quarter: 17–32, 24–29, 22–26, 23–29
Pts: Jayson Tatum 18; Rebs: Al Horford 7 Asts: Marcus Smart 6	Pts: LeBron James 27; Rebs: Kevin Love 14; Asts: LeBron James 12
Boston leads series, 2–1

Quicken Loans Arena, Cleveland, Ohio
Attendance: 20,562
Referees: James Capers, Josh Tiven, Zach Zarba

ESPN

May 21
8:30 pm

Boxscore

Boston Celtics 102, Cleveland Cavaliers 111
Scoring by quarter: 18–34, 35–34, 23–21, 26–22
Pts: Jaylen Brown 25; Rebs: Al Horford 7 Asts: Terry Rozier 11	Pts: LeBron James 44; Rebs: Tristan Thompson 12; Asts: four players 3 each
Series tied, 2–2

Quicken Loans Arena, Cleveland, Ohio
Attendance: 20,562
Referees: Scott Foster, Bill Kennedy, Eric Lewis

ESPN

May 23
8:30 pm

Boxscore

Cleveland Cavaliers 83, Boston Celtics 96
Scoring by quarter: 19–32, 23–21, 18–23, 23–20
Pts: LeBron James 26; Rebs: LeBron James 10; Asts: LeBron James 5	Pts: Jayson Tatum 24; Rebs: Al Horford 12; Asts: Terry Rozier 6
Boston leads series, 3–2

TD Garden, Boston, Massachusetts
Attendance: 18,624
Referees: Ken Mauer, Ed Malloy, Jason Phillips

ESPN

May 25
8:30 pm

Boxscore

Boston Celtics 99, Cleveland Cavaliers 109
Scoring by quarter: 25–20, 18–34, 30–29, 26–26
Pts: Terry Rozier 28; Rebs: Al Horford 9 Asts: Marcus Smart 8	Pts: LeBron James 46; Rebs: LeBron James 11; Asts: LeBron James 9
Series tied, 3–3

Quicken Loans Arena, Cleveland, Ohio
Attendance: 20,562
Referees: Mike Callahan, John Goble, Derrick Stafford

ESPN

May 27
8:30 pm

Boxscore

Cleveland Cavaliers 87, Boston Celtics 79
Scoring by quarter: 18–26, 21–17, 20–13, 28–23
Pts: LeBron James 35; Rebs: LeBron James 15; Asts: LeBron James 9	Pts: Jayson Tatum 24; Rebs: Marcus Morris 12; Asts: Marcus Smart 7
Cleveland wins series, 4–3

TD Garden, Boston, Massachusetts
Attendance: 18,624
Referees: Marc Davis, James Capers, Zach Zarba

It marked the first time since the 1987–88 season that the Celtics made two consecutive Conference finals. It was also the Celtics' first home loss of the postseason. Their loss at home after leading 3–2 in the series was the first time that had happened since 2009. This was the fifth time in NBA history that the road team won a Game 7 after the home team had won each of the first six games. LeBron James became the first non-Celtic to advance to 8 consecutive NBA Finals. It was also the second time in the Celtics' history that they had lost a playoff series in which they had taken a 2–0 lead.

Regular-season series
Cleveland won 2–1 in the regular-season series

October 17, 2017

Recap

Boston Celtics 99, Cleveland Cavaliers 102

Quicken Loans Arena, Cleveland, Ohio

January 3, 2018

Recap

Cleveland Cavaliers 88, Boston Celtics 102

TD Garden, Boston, Massachusetts

February 11, 2018

Recap

Cleveland Cavaliers 121, Boston Celtics 99

TD Garden, Boston, Massachusetts

This was the eighth playoff meeting between these two teams, with the Celtics winning four of the first seven meetings.

Previous playoff series
Boston leads 4–3 in all-time playoff series

1976

Boston Celtics 4, Cleveland Cavaliers 2

1976 Eastern Conference finals

1985

Boston Celtics 3, Cleveland Cavaliers 1

1985 Eastern Conference First Round

1992

Cleveland Cavaliers 4, Boston Celtics 3

1992 Eastern Conference semifinals

2008

Boston Celtics 4, Cleveland Cavaliers 3

2008 Eastern Conference semifinals

2010

Cleveland Cavaliers 2, Boston Celtics 4

2010 Eastern Conference semifinals

2015

Cleveland Cavaliers 4, Boston Celtics 0

2015 Eastern Conference First Round

2017

Cleveland Cavaliers 4, Boston Celtics 1

2017 Eastern Conference finals

- This is the most recent playoff series between the Celtics & Cavaliers until 2024.

=== Western Conference finals ===
==== (1) Houston Rockets vs. (2) Golden State Warriors ====
TNT

May 14
9:00 pm (8:00 pm CDT)

Boxscore

Golden State Warriors 119, Houston Rockets 106
Scoring by quarter: 29–30, 27–26, 31–24, 32–26
Pts: Kevin Durant 37; Rebs: Draymond Green 9 Asts: Draymond Green 9	Pts: James Harden 41; Rebs: Chris Paul 11; Asts: James Harden 7
Golden State leads series, 1–0

Toyota Center, Houston, Texas
Attendance: 18,055
Referees: Scott Foster, Tony Brothers, Tom Washington

TNT

May 16
9:00 pm (8:00 pm CDT)

Boxscore

Golden State Warriors 105, Houston Rockets 127
Scoring by quarter: 21–26, 29–38, 29–31, 26–32
Pts: Kevin Durant 38; Rebs: Stephen Curry 7 Asts: Stephen Curry 7	Pts: Gordon, Harden 27 each Rebs: Capela, Harden 10 each Asts: Ariza, Paul 6 each
Series tied, 1–1

Toyota Center, Houston, Texas
Attendance: 18,119
Referees: Ken Mauer, David Guthrie, Ed Malloy

TNT

May 20
8:00 pm (5:00 pm PDT)

Boxscore

Houston Rockets 85, Golden State Warriors 126
Scoring by quarter: 22–31, 21–23, 24–34, 18–38
Pts: James Harden 20; Rebs: Chris Paul 10; Asts: James Harden 9	Pts: Stephen Curry 35; Rebs: Draymond Green 17; Asts: Durant, Green 6 each
Golden State leads series, 2–1

Oracle Arena, Oakland, California
Attendance: 19,596
Referees: Marc Davis, Sean Corbin, Jason Phillips

TNT

May 22
9:00 pm (6:00 pm PDT)

Boxscore

Houston Rockets 95, Golden State Warriors 92
Scoring by quarter: 19–28, 34–18, 17–34, 25–12
Pts: James Harden 30; Rebs: P. J. Tucker 16; Asts: Harden, Paul 4 each	Pts: Stephen Curry 28; Rebs: Draymond Green 13; Asts: Draymond Green 8
Series tied, 2–2

Oracle Arena, Oakland, California
Attendance: 19,596
Referees: Mike Callahan, Kane Fitzgerald, Derrick Stafford

TNT

May 24
9:00 pm (8:00 pm CDT)

Boxscore

Golden State Warriors 94, Houston Rockets 98
Scoring by quarter: 17–23, 28–22, 27–26, 22–27
Pts: Kevin Durant 29; Rebs: Draymond Green 15; Asts: Stephen Curry 6	Pts: Eric Gordon 24; Rebs: Clint Capela 14; Asts: Chris Paul 6
Houston leads series, 3–2

Toyota Center, Houston, Texas
Attendance: 18,208
Referees: James Capers, Eric Lewis, Zach Zarba

The game was a memorable back-and-forth affair that came down to the wire. In the final 6.7 seconds with the Rockets up 96–94, the Warriors had one last chance to tie or take the lead in the game. However, Draymond Green lost his balance and turned the ball over to Eric Gordon who was then fouled and sealed the game by making both of his free throws. Houston was now a win away from their first trip to the NBA Finals since 1995, but it came at a cost as Chris Paul suffered a "right hamstring injury" in the final minute. He did not play for the rest of the series.

Kevin Durant scored 29 points while Draymond Green had 15 rebounds & Stephen Curry had 6 assists for the Warriors

Eric Gordon scored 24 points while Clint Capela scored 14 rebounds & Chris Paul with 6 assists for the Rockets.

TNT

May 26
9:00 pm (6:00 pm PDT)

Boxscore

Houston Rockets 86, Golden State Warriors 115
Scoring by quarter: 39–22, 22–29, 16–33, 9–31
Pts: James Harden 32; Rebs: Clint Capela 15; Asts: James Harden 9	Pts: Klay Thompson 35; Rebs: Draymond Green 10; Asts: Draymond Green 9
Series tied, 3–3

Oracle Arena, Oakland, California
Attendance: 19,596
Referees: Ken Mauer, David Guthrie, Ed Malloy

Golden State rallied from a 17-point first quarter deficit by outscoring Houston 64–25 in the second half to force a Game 7. The Rockets' 25 second-half points tied a franchise record low for scoring in any half in the postseason.

TNT

May 28
9:00 pm (8:00 pm CDT)

Boxscore

Golden State Warriors 101, Houston Rockets 92
Scoring by quarter: 19–24, 24–30, 33–15, 25–23
Pts: Kevin Durant 34; Rebs: Draymond Green 13; Asts: Stephen Curry 10	Pts: James Harden 32; Rebs: P. J. Tucker 12; Asts: Gordon, Harden 6 each
Golden State wins series, 4–3

Toyota Center, Houston, Texas
Attendance: 18,055
Referees: Scott Foster, Mike Callahan, Derrick Stafford

The Rockets controlled the 1st half, leading by as much as 15 points. The half ended on an Eric Gordon buzzer-beating layup, putting the score at halftime 54–43 in favor of Houston. However, the game took a drastic change from that point as the Warriors would once again rally and took the lead with 4 minutes left in the 3rd quarter, a lead they never relinquished as they continued to cruise throughout the rest of the game to win their 4th Consecutive Western Conference title.

For The Warriors: Kevin Durant scored 34 points, Draymond Green scored 13 rebounds & Steph Curry scored 10 assists, the Team went 16-of-39 from the 3-point line during the game

For The Rockets: Although James Harden scored 32 points & 6 Assists with P.J. Tucker securing 12 rebounds, the Rockets missed 27 consecutive 3-pointers, which is a record for most ever missed consecutively in a playoff game. They also went 1-of-30 from the 3-point line to close out the game.

This is the Warriors' first game 7 road win since 1948 and the first Western Conference team to win a conference finals game 7 on the road since the 2001–02 Los Angeles Lakers.

Regular-season series
Houston won 2–1 in the regular-season series

October 17, 2017

Recap

Houston Rockets 122, Golden State Warriors 121

Oracle Arena, Oakland, California

January 4, 2018

Recap

Golden State Warriors 124, Houston Rockets 114

Toyota Center, Houston, Texas

January 20, 2018

Recap

Golden State Warriors 108, Houston Rockets 116

Toyota Center, Houston, Texas

This was the third playoff meeting between these two teams, with the Warriors winning the first two meetings.

Previous playoffs series
Golden State leads 2–0 in all-time playoff series

2015

Golden State Warriors 4, Houston Rockets 1

2015 Western Conference finals

2016

Golden State Warriors 4, Houston Rockets 1

2016 Western Conference First Round

== 2018 NBA Finals: (E4) Cleveland Cavaliers vs. (W2) Golden State Warriors ==
Note: Times are EDT (UTC−4) as listed by the NBA. If the venue is located in a different time zone, the local time is also given.

ABC

May 31
9:00 pm (6:00 pm PDT)

Boxscore

Cleveland Cavaliers 114, Golden State Warriors 124 (OT)
Scoring by quarter: 30–29, 26–27, 22–28, 29–23, Overtime: 7–17
Pts: LeBron James 51; Rebs: Kevin Love 13; Asts: LeBron James 8	Pts: Stephen Curry 29; Rebs: Draymond Green 11; Asts: Green, Curry 9 each
Golden State leads series, 1–0

Oracle Arena, Oakland, California
Attendance: 19,596
Referees: Ken Mauer, Tony Brothers, Ed Malloy

ABC

June 3
8:00 pm (5:00 pm PDT)

Boxscore

Cleveland Cavaliers 103, Golden State Warriors 122
Scoring by quarter: 28–32, 18–27, 34–31, 23–32
Pts: LeBron James 29; Rebs: Kevin Love 10; Asts: LeBron James 13	Pts: Stephen Curry 33; Rebs: Kevin Durant 9 Asts: Stephen Curry 8
Golden State leads series, 2–0

Oracle Arena, Oakland, California
Attendance: 19,596
Referees: Mike Callahan, David Guthrie, Derrick Stafford

ABC

June 6
9:00 pm

Boxscore

Golden State Warriors 110, Cleveland Cavaliers 102
Scoring by quarter: 28–29, 24–29, 31–23, 27–21
Pts: Kevin Durant 43; Rebs: Kevin Durant 13; Asts: Draymond Green 9	Pts: LeBron James 33; Rebs: Kevin Love 13; Asts: LeBron James 11
Golden State leads series, 3–0

Quicken Loans Arena, Cleveland, Ohio
Attendance: 20,562
Referees: Marc Davis, John Goble, Zach Zarba

ABC

June 8
9:00 pm

Boxscore

Golden State Warriors 108, Cleveland Cavaliers 85
Scoring by quarter: 34–25, 27–27, 25–13, 22–20
Pts: Stephen Curry 37; Rebs: Kevin Durant 12; Asts: Kevin Durant 10	Pts: LeBron James 23; Rebs: Kevin Love 9 Asts: LeBron James 8
Golden State wins series, 4–0

Quicken Loans Arena, Cleveland, Ohio
Attendance: 20,562
Referees: Scott Foster, James Capers, Jason Phillips

Game 1 would go on to be an instant classic, with LeBron James scoring 51 points. The game was tight throughout, as neither team was able to gain separation. However, the final minutes did not come without controversy as Durant seemingly charged onto James when driving to the basket. The officials reviewed that James was not within the restricted area, and the call was then reversed into a blocking foul, thus allowing Durant to tie the game with a pair of free throws. Eventually, when the Warriors were leading 107–106, James passed the ball that went out of bounds while George Hill was fouled, thus giving him a pair of free throws. After making the first free throw to tie it at 107, he missed the second free throw, which was rebounded by J.R. Smith, who ran the clock as it was perceived that he believed the Cavaliers had the lead. He passed the ball to Hill, whose shot was blocked by Draymond Green at the buzzer. The Warriors dominated overtime 17–7 as they won the series opener 124–114. Stephen Curry, Kevin Durant, and Klay Thompson respectively scored 29, 26, and 24 points. In Game 2, the Warriors blew out the Cavs 122–103 as Curry sank 9 three-pointers and finished with 33 points and Durant dropped 26 points. The Warriors sent more double teams on James, holding him to 29 points. As Game 3 shifted to Cleveland, the Cavaliers dominated the first half, leading by as many as 13. Curry and Thompson, the Splash Brothers, had a bad night only combining for only 21 points on 7-27 shooting. However, in the second half, the Warriors fought back, making it a back-and-forth game as Kevin Durant scored 43 points, and made a key clutch shot in the closing minutes that put the Warriors up 106–100, and eventually winning 110–102 to put the Warriors up 3–0 for the second straight year. After a close first half in Game 4, the Warriors dominated the third quarter and routed the Cavaliers 108–85 behind Stephen Curry's 37 points and seven three-pointers, as well as a triple-double by Durant, thus completing the sweep. Durant won Finals MVP for the second straight year behind averages of 28.8 points, 10.8 rebounds and 7.5 assists, while Curry averaged 27.5 points for the series. LeBron James led both teams in scoring and assists, putting up averages of 34.0 points and 10.0 assists in a losing effort.

Regular-season series
Golden State won 2–0 in the regular-season series

December 25, 2017

Recap

Cleveland Cavaliers 92, Golden State Warriors 99

Oracle Arena, Oakland, California

January 15, 2018

Recap

Golden State Warriors 118, Cleveland Cavaliers 108

Quicken Loans Arena, Cleveland, Ohio

This was the fourth meeting in the NBA Finals between these two teams, with the Warriors winning two of the first three meetings.

Previous playoffs series
Golden State leads 2–1 in all-time playoff series

2015

Golden State Warriors 4, Cleveland Cavaliers 2

2015 NBA Finals

2016

Golden State Warriors 3, Cleveland Cavaliers 4

2016 NBA Finals

2017

Cleveland Cavaliers 1, Golden State Warriors 4

2017 NBA Finals

== Statistical leaders ==
Category	Game high			Average			
Category	Player	Team	High	Player	Team	Avg.	GP
Points	LeBron James	Cleveland Cavaliers	51	LeBron James	Cleveland Cavaliers	34.0	22
Rebounds	Jonas Valančiūnas	Toronto Raptors	21	Anthony Davis	New Orleans Pelicans	13.4	9
Assists	Rajon Rondo	New Orleans Pelicans	21	Rajon Rondo	New Orleans Pelicans	12.2	9
Steals	Josh Richardson	Miami Heat	7	Victor Oladipo	Indiana Pacers	2.43	7
Blocks	John Henson; Clint Capela	Milwaukee Bucks; Houston Rockets	6	Anthony Davis	New Orleans Pelicans	2.33	9

== Media coverage ==
=== Television ===
ESPN, TNT, ABC, NBA TV, ESPN2, and ESPNews televised the playoffs nationally in the United States. In the first round, regional sports networks affiliated with the teams also broadcast the games, except for games televised on ABC. Throughout the first two rounds, TNT televised games Sunday through Wednesday(2nd round), Thursday (1st round), ESPN televised games Thursday (2nd round)and Friday, and ABC televised selected games on Saturday and Sunday, usually in the afternoon. NBA TV, ESPN2 and ESPNEWS has aired select weekday games in the first round. ESPN/ABC televised the Eastern Conference finals, while the Western Conference finals was televised by TNT. ABC had exclusive television rights to the 2018 NBA Finals, which was the 16th consecutive year for the network.
