= Mark Ayotte =

American basketball referee (born 1964)

Mark Ayotte (born March 12, 1964, in Ishpeming, Michigan) is a professional basketball referee in the National Basketball Association. He wears the uniform number 56. He has refereed 741 regular season and three playoff games. Prior to joining the NBA, he was an official with the WNBA and the CBA.
